= The World of Yesterday =

1942 book by Stefan Zweig

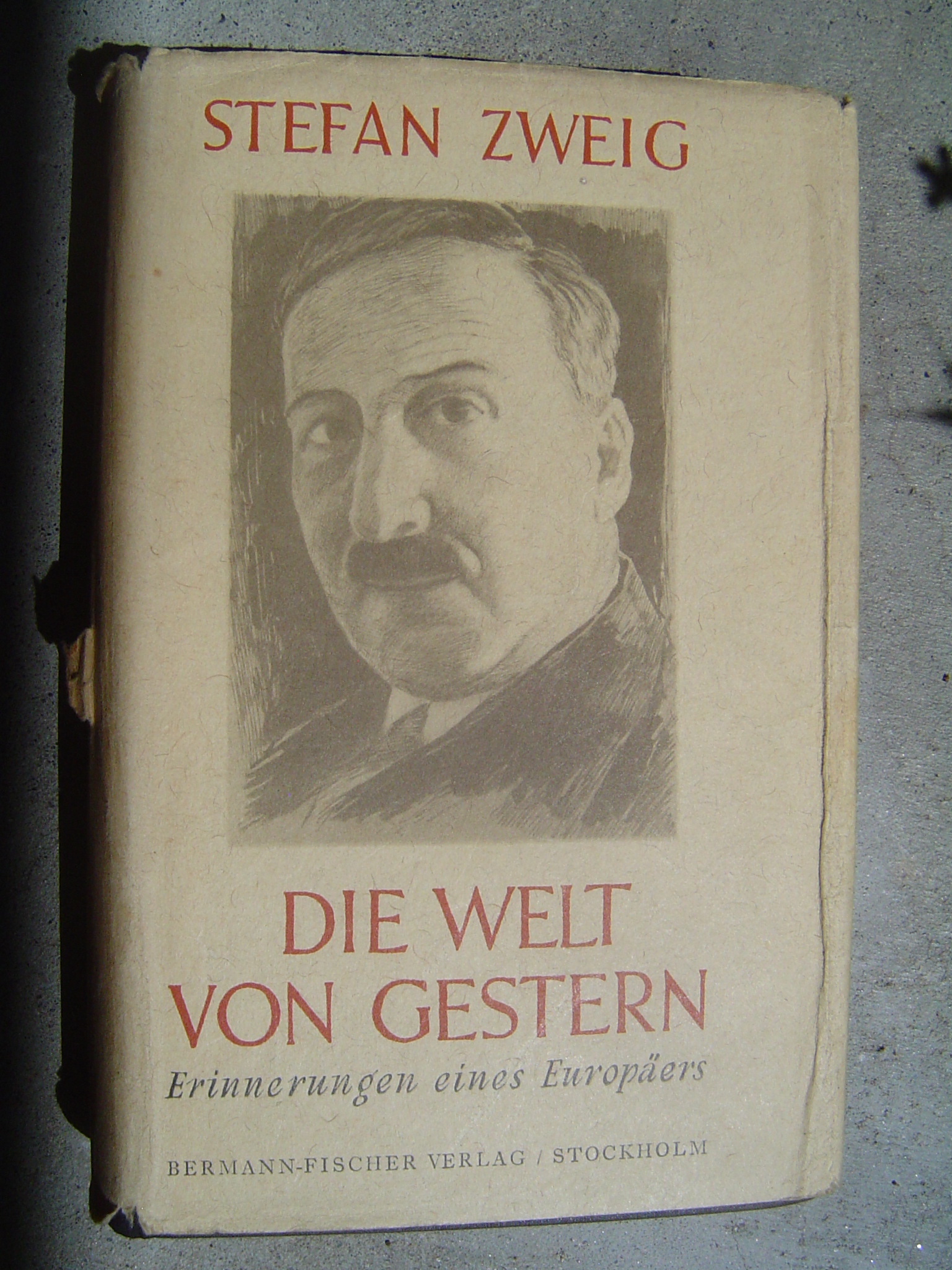
- The World of Yesterday (Die Welt von Gestern: Erinnerungen eines Europäers) book cover, 1942
- Author: Stefan Zweig
- Original title: Die Welt von Gestern
- Language: German
- Publication date: 1942
- Publication place: Sweden
- English publication date: 1943
- Media type: Print

The World of Yesterday: Memoires of a European (German title Die Welt von Gestern: Erinnerungen eines Europäers) is the memoir of Austrian writer Stefan Zweig. It has been called the most famous book on the Habsburg Empire. He started writing it in 1934 when, anticipating Anschluss and Nazi persecution, he uprooted himself from Austria to England and later to Brazil. He posted the manuscript, typed by his second wife Lotte Altmann, to the publisher the day before Zweig and Altmann both committed suicide in February 1942.

== Publication history ==
The book was first published in its original German by an anti-Nazi Exilliteratur (exile literature) publishing firm based in Stockholm (1942), as Die Welt von Gestern. It was first published in English in April 1943 by Viking Press and by Cassell in a translation by Helmut Ripperger and B. W. Huebsch. In 2011, Plunkett Lake Press reissued it in eBook form. In 2013, the University of Nebraska Press published a translation by Anthea Bell.

== Content ==
The book describes life in Vienna at the start of the 20th century with detailed anecdotes. It depicts the dying days of Austria-Hungary under the emperors Franz Joseph I of Austria (reigned 1848–1916) and Karl I of Austria (reigned 1916–1918), including the country's literature, the arts, the system of education, and the sexual ethics prevalent at the time, the same that provided the backdrop to the emergence of psychoanalysis. Zweig also describes the stability of Viennese society after centuries of Habsburg rule.

== Summary ==
Zweig writes his autobiography following the terrible upheavals experienced by his generation. He feels the need to bear witness to the next generation of what his age has gone through. He realizes that his past is "out of reach." Zweig makes it clear that his biography is based entirely on his memories. He looks back on his youth in pre-war Austrian society, focusing primarily on Vienna, calling that time the "Golden Age of Security," where stable politics and economy meant everyone could see themselves comfortably into the future. His family represents the cosmopolitan "good Jewish bourgeoisie," which had become a patron of Viennese culture. Vienna had become the city of culture, and Zweig states that the Viennese had good taste, and artists, especially theatre actors, were valued in Austria.

In school, Zweig criticizes the old way of impersonal, cold, and distant teaching. He claims that the school's purpose was to discipline and calm the youth's ardor, and that there was a certain distrust of young people in society. In the face of this pressure, the students harbored a deep hatred toward authority but became entranced by the abundance of art in Vienna. Rainer Maria Rilke and Hugo von Hofmannsthal, young writers, become symbols of a whole movement of the younger generation of artists. Zweig also criticizes the suppression of discourse around sexual impulses leading to the ubiquity of prostitution, venereal disease, and constriction both in clothing and behavior between sexes, though notes that by his writing in the late 1930s the situation had dramatically improved for both women and men, and the generation after him was much more fortunate. Also during his youth, the first mass movements affected Austria, starting with the socialist movement, then the Christian Democratic Movement, and finally, the German Reich's unification movement. In addition, the anti-Semitic trend began to gain momentum, although it was still relatively moderate in its early stages, and he experienced relatively little bigotry personally.

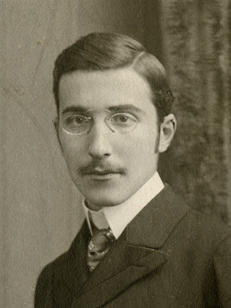
Portrait of Zweig, Vienna c. 1900

Zweig studies philosophy at college to give himself as much time as possible to write, collect his poems, and discover other things. At nineteen, he is published in Neue Freie Presse, where he meets editor Theodor Herzl for whom he nourished a deep admiration, and afterwards begins to travel the world. He goes to Berlin, a city that attracted new talent, to escape his young celebrity and meet people beyond the circle of the Jewish bourgeoisie in Vienna. Zweig meets poet Peter Hille and anthroposophy's founder Rudolf Steiner, and translates poems and literary texts into his mother tongue to perfect his German. He meets with Émile Verhaeren while visiting the studio of Charles van der Stappen, and after finishing his studies leaves for Paris. He becomes close with Léon Bazalgette and Rainer Maria Rilke. Zweig also meets with Auguste Rodin, who gives him a tour of his studio and his last still unfinished creation before beginning to retouch his creation, and ends up forgetting Zweig's presence altogether. Leaving for London after an incident with his stolen suitcase and to improve his spoken English, he attends a private reading of poems by William Butler Yeats.

While abroad, the only valuables he carries with him are autographs and other writings from authors he admires, notably Johann Wolfgang von Goethe. He boasts of having been able to meet Goethe's niece, on whom Goethe's gaze has lovingly rested. With Insel Verlag Publishing House, he published his first dramas, notably Thersites, based on the character of the same name in Homer's Iliad. Zweig then recounts that four times, the performances that could have quickly propelled him to glory were stopped by the star actor or director's death. Zweig initially thought he was being chased by fate, but he recognizes afterward that very often, chance takes on the appearance of destiny. This brings him back to his first vocation, that of a writer. Continuing to travel, he meets Walther Rathenau, whom he deeply admires. While in India, he criticizes the caste system as discriminatory and unjust. There, he meets Karl Haushofer, whom he regards with high esteem during his journey, although he is later saddened by the adoption of his ideas by the Nazi regime. Zweig then travels to the United States, which left him with a powerful impression. He is pleased to see how easy it is for any individual to find work and make a living without asking for his origin, papers, or anything else.

Zweig contemplates that it must now be difficult for the generation after him to live through crises and catastrophes and still maintain optimism, but his generation witnessed a rapid improvement in living conditions, a series of discoveries and innovations, and the liberation of youth. Optimism itself thwarted any attempt to seek peace between nations—each believing that the other side valued peace more than anything else, and that social progress was inevitable. He describes the Redl affair represents the first event in which tensions were palpable. When he visits the cinema in Tours, he was amazed to see that the hatred displayed against Kaiser Wilhelm II had already spread throughout France.

In 1914, news of the death of Franz Ferdinand of Austria breaks, though few anticipate that world war would break out. Zweig had visited with friends in Belgium a few days before war was declared, and was convinced that Belgium would not be attacked. In the early days, solidarity and brotherhood were at their peak. This enthusiasm is explained by an idealization of war, possible by the heightened optimism of the century and the almost blind confidence in governments' honesty. This enthusiasm quickly turned into a deep hatred towards the enemies of the fatherland. Zweig does not participate in this widespread hatred, as he knows the now rival nations too well to hate them overnight. Physically unfit to go to the front, he committed his effort to work as a librarian within the military archives and is rejected by many friends who consider him a traitor to his nation, Zweig undertakes a personal fight against the war. He publishes an article in the "Berliner Tageblatt", urging others to remain faithful to friendships beyond borders. Shortly after, he receives a letter from his friend Romain Rolland, and the two decide to promote reconciliation. Zweig travels to Russian front for his work and sees the dire situation in which the soldiers find themselves. His anger towards those who architected the war increases. Zweig publishes his anti-war drama "Jeremias" in October 1917. To his surprise, his work was very well received, and he is offered to represent the work in Zurich. On the way to Switzerland, meets two Austrians on his journey who would play a significant role once Austria had surrendered: Heinrich Lammasch and Ignaz Seipel. When Zweig arrives in Switzerland, he is immediately relieved and happy to enter a country at peace, and unites with Rolland. During the stay, he meets Henri Guilbeaux and James Joyce. After the relative success of his play, Zweig gradually realizes that Switzerland is not only a land of refuge, but of espionage and counter-espionage. The war then ends, to general celebration.

Once the German and Austrian defeat has been confirmed, Zweig decides to return to Austria, driven by a patriotic impulse. Winter is approaching, and the country is now in the greatest need. He attends by accident the last Austrian Emperor Karl I's departure in the station, marking the end of Hapsburg rule. In Austria, material goods are hard to come by and quality of life is low due to war shortages. Paradoxically, theaters, concerts, and operas are active, and artistic and cultural life is in full swing, something that Zweig attributes to the general feeling that any performance could be the last. At the same time, the young generation rebels against the old authority: homosexuality becomes a sign of protest, young writers think outside the box, and painters abandon classicism for cubism and surrealism. After three years in Salzburg, Zweig decides to travel with his wife to Italy. Initially apprehensive, he is surprised by the Italians' hospitality and thoughtfulness. He meets poet Giuseppe Antonio Borgese and painter Alberto Stringa. Zweig admits to being, at that moment, still lulled by the illusion that the war is over, although he has the opportunity to hear young Italians singing "Giovinezza." Zweig then goes to Germany to see his friend Rathenau, who is now Minister of Foreign Affairs, but he is soon assassinated and Germany sinks into hyperinflation, debauchery, and disorder. According to Zweig, this sad episode was decisive for the rise of the Nazi Party. He finds pleasure in seeing Maxim Gorky, whom he already admired at school, write the preface to one of his works. As his fame increases, he naively enjoys it at first on his travels, but it weighs on him. He states he wishes he had written under a pseudonym to enjoy his celebrity in serenity.

After wanting to visit Russia for some time, Zweig has the opportunity to go on the birthday of Leo Tolstoy. At first, Zweig is fascinated by the authenticity of the inhabitants, their friendliness, and their warm welcome. Following a visit to Tolstoy's tomb, he realizes that someone has slipped him a letter in French, warning him of the propaganda of the Soviet regime. Later, Zweig successfully uses his celebrity to ask Benito Mussolini to spare the life of Giuseppe Germani, an activist whose wife asks Zweig for help. Back in Salzburg, Zweig is impressed by the cultural scope of the city, now the artistic center of Europe. Seeing fellow artists and writers allows him to complete his autographs and first drafts collection. Still, he is dissatisfied, and partly wishes something would trouble and torment him so that he could enter a new fight.

Zweig states no witness to significant changes can recognize them at their beginnings. He had not recognized the coming danger of the Nazis, who started organizing and agitating in Austria in the 1920s. Zweig was a committed pacifist, but hated politics and shunned political engagement. However, he is struck that the Berghof, Hitler's mountain residence in Berchtesgaden, an area of early Nazi activity, was just across the valley from his own house outside Salzburg. Zweig had told his publisher that his books would be banned as soon as the Reichstag was burnt down—something he once believed was impossible. He then describes the progressive censorship that descended on his opera Die schweigsame Frau as he witnessed the artistic power of his composer and collaborator Richard Strauss. During these first troubles, Zweig went to France, then to England, where he undertook the biography of Mary, Queen of Scots, noting the need for an objective and accurate work. Once completed, he returned to Salzburg, where he realized the critical situation of his country: even with shootings breaking out daily in the streets, foreign newspapers were better informed than he was. Zweig chooses to flee to London when the police forcibly search his residence, a previously unthinkable violation of civil liberties.

After the Munich peace agreement, Zweig suspected that negotiation with Hitler was pointless, as he would break every commitment at the right time. However, Zweig remained silent, knowing he could not influence England, and reflects on the cruelty of statelessness. He attends a memorable debate between H. G. Wells and George Bernard Shaw, of whom he gives a long and admiring description. He also saw his friend Sigmund Freud, who had managed to reach England. Delighted to speak with Freud one last time, Zweig attended his funeral shortly after. As Zweig prepared for his new marriage, Germany invaded Poland, which then led to the United Kingdom declaring war on Germany, making him an "enemy national." At a PEN conference, Zweig stopped in Vigo, Spain, then in the hands of General Franco, noting again with bitterness the young people swaggering in fascist uniforms. However, after moving to Argentina and seeing the Hispanic heritage still intact, he regained hope. He praises Brazil, his last host country, a land of immigrants looking to the future.

Zweig looks back to Austria's annexation. His friends had firmly believed that the neighboring countries would never accept such an event, but Zweig had already, in autumn of 1937, said goodbye to his mother and the rest of his family. He then watched as his family and nation were lost to Nazi barbarism. Zweig then develops an extended meditation on the tribulations that pursue all the Jews, despite the great cultural and religious variety of those designated as such. He ends his work by admitting to being defeated by hatred, even by its shadow, but with this consolation:

Aber jeder Schatten ist im letzten doch auch Kind des Lichts, und nur wer Helles und Dunkles, Krieg und Frieden, Aufstieg und Niedergang erfahren, nur der hat wahrhaft gelebt.
But every shadow is ultimately also the daughter of light, and only he who has known light and darkness, war and peace, rise and fall, only this one has truly lived.

— Stefan Zweig, Die Agonie des Friedens, Die Welt von Gestern

== Intellectual life ==
The World of Yesterday details Zweig's career before, during, and after World War I. Of particular interest are Zweig's description of various intellectual personalities, including Theodor Herzl, the founder of modern political Zionism, Rainer Maria Rilke, the Belgian poet Emile Verhaeren, the composer Ferruccio Busoni, the philosopher and antifascist Benedetto Croce, Maxim Gorky, Hugo von Hofmannsthal, Arthur Schnitzler, Franz Werfel, Gerhart Hauptmann, James Joyce, Nobel Peace Prize laureate Bertha von Suttner, the German industrialist and politician Walther Rathenau, and the writer Romain Rolland.

Zweig also met Karl Haushofer during a trip to India. The two became friends. Haushofer was the founder of geopolitics and later became an influence on Adolf Hitler. Zweig was always aloof from politics and overlooked the dark potential of Haushofer's thoughts; he was surprised when later told of links between Hitler and Haushofer.

Zweig particularly admired the poetry of Hugo von Hofmannsthal and expressed this admiration and Hofmannsthal's influence on his generation in the chapter devoted to his school years:

"The appearance of the young Hofmannsthal is and remains notable as one of the greatest miracles of accomplishment early in life; in world literature, except for Keats and Rimbaud, I know no other youthful example of a similar impeccability in the mastering of language, no such breadth of spiritual buoyancy, nothing more permeated with a poetic substance even in the most simple lines, than in this magnificent genius, who already in his sixteenth and seventeenth year had inscribed himself in the eternal annals of the German language with unextinguishable verses and prose which today has still not been surpassed. His sudden beginning and simultaneous completion was a phenomenon that hardly occurs more than once in a generation."

— Stefan Zweig, Die Welt von Gestern, Frankfurt am Main 1986, 63–64

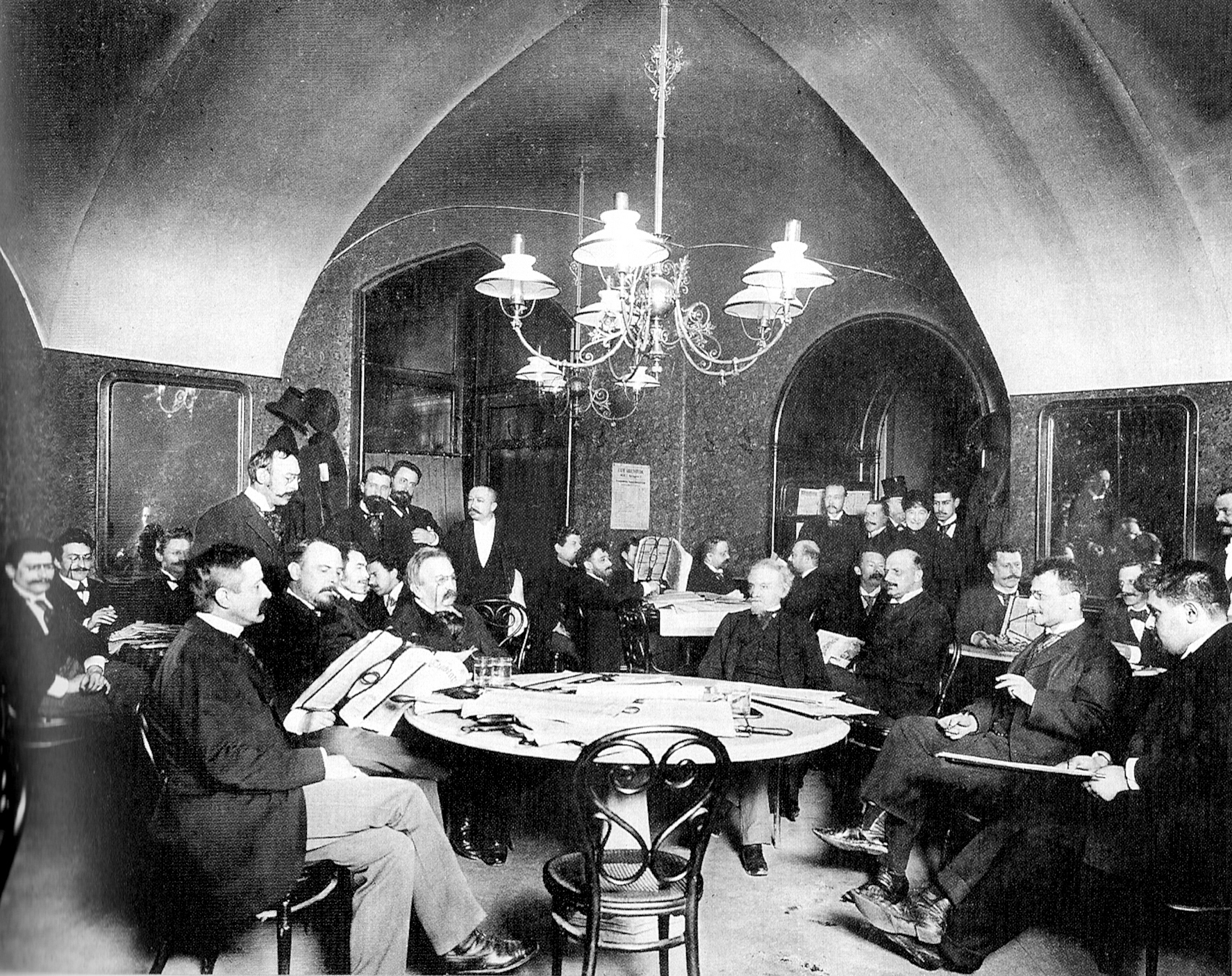
Café Griensteidl in Vienna, sometime before 1897. Zweig referred to it as the "headquarters of young literature".

Zweig also describes his passion for collecting manuscripts, primarily literary and musical.

Zweig collaborated in the early 1930s with composer Richard Strauss on the opera Die schweigsame Frau, which is based on a libretto by Zweig. Strauss was then admired by the Nazis, who were not happy that their favorite composer's new opera had a Jewish author's libretto. Zweig recounts that Strauss refused to withdraw the opera and even insisted that Zweig's authorship of the libretto be credited; the first performance in Dresden was said to have been authorized by Hitler himself. Zweig thought it prudent not to be present. The run was interrupted after the second performance, as the Gestapo had intercepted a private letter from Strauss to Zweig. The elderly composer invited Zweig to write the libretto for another opera. According to Zweig, this led to Strauss's resignation as president of the Reichsmusikkammer, the Nazi state institute for music.

Zweig discusses the tragic effects of contemporary antisemitism, but he does not analyze his Jewish identity in detail. Toward the end of the book he describes his friendship with Sigmund Freud, mainly while both lived in London during the last year of Freud's life.

== Adaptations ==
- 2014: At the end of Wes Anderson's movie The Grand Budapest Hotel, credit is given for inspiration by Zweig's writings. Anderson directly discussed the fictional Beware of Pity and The Post Office Girl. Parallels are also observable with Zweig's life as described in The World Of Yesterday, including the nationally transformative theme, the plight of refugees, the rise of facism and loss of security. There exists also in the film, a multinational network of experts and friends bound by vocation, who assist each other beyond nationalism; this appears to be a reference to Zweig's network of writer friends.
- 2016 : Le monde d'hier, a dramatic adaptation by Laurent Seksik, was staged, directed by Patrick Pineau and Jérôme Kircher at the Théâtre de Mathurins in Paris.
- 2023: The World of Yesterday is performed as a one-man English language play for Famous Writers starring David Sibley as Zweig.
