= François Mireur =

French general (1770–1798)

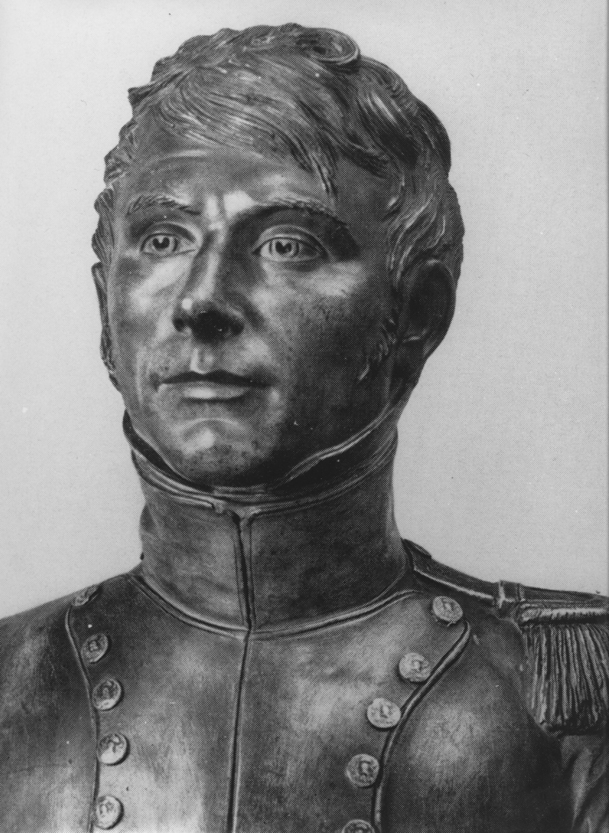
- Terra-cotta bust of Mireur at the Factory of Medicine in Montpellier
- Born: February 5, 1770; Escragnolles, France
- Died: July 9, 1798 (aged 28); Damanhur, Egypt
- Military career
- Allegiance: French First Republic
- Branch: French Army
- Service years: 1792–1798
- Rank: Général de brigade
- Conflicts: Egyptian Campaign

François Mireur (February 5, 1770 – July 9, 1798) was a French general who is notable for having sung the "War Song for the Army of the Rhine", later known as La Marseillaise, in 1792 when he volunteered for the newly created republican army. He later served under Napoleon Bonaparte and was killed in Egypt in 1798.

== Biography ==
Mireur was born in Escragnolles in Provence in 1770, and studied as a medical doctor at the Faculty of Medicine in Montpellier. In 1792, he became a doctor, but volunteered for the army shortly afterwards. That year, he sang Rouget de Lisle's war song for the Army of the Rhine when he was headed to Marseille to coordinate volunteers from Southern towns. The song thus became known as "La Marseillaise", which was adopted as the French national anthem in 1795.

In the Decisive Moments in History, Stefan Zweig imagined the scene of Mireur singing the song in a crowded room at a Republican banquet in Marseille, on June 22, 1792.

During the war, Mireur fought at the Battle of Valmy, a foundational moment the very day following the creation of the French Republic. He later served in Germany and in the Italian Campaign of Napoleon as a chief of staff of his friend general Bernadotte. In 1797, he was promoted to general and a few months later was designated among the leading officers of the French army that occupied Rome to oust Pope Pius VI and establish a Republic in the Church's states.

In July 1798 Mireur served alongside Louis Desaix and general Dumas, Alexandre Dumas' father, in the Egyptian Campaign, where he fought the Mamelukes and Bedouins. It was in this war that Mireur met his end. The general did not agree with the Directory's plan of sending an army to Egypt and openly condemned and criticized this along with some other officers. While in a war council led by Napoleon, he proposed that the army must leave and abandon Egypt immediately to ensure peace with the Austrian empire be better guaranteed in Continental Europe, and come back better prepared. According to Nicolas Philibert Desvernois, a junior cavalry officer, Napoleon coldly ignored his pleas and ended the session at once.

There is a controversy as to whether realizing that his career as a soldier was over, the following morning an enraged Mireur walked out in the desert and shot himself in the head, or if he was simply killed by Beduins as he ventured outside of the camp. When the soldiers found him he was given a burial with military honours. His name was inscribed on the 28th pillar of the Arc de Triomphe at the top of the south pillar, near the avenue Kleber. He was honored as a national hero because of his role in popularising the Marseillaise.

As he secretly landed to France from his exile in Elba island in 1814, Napoleon made a halt in Escragnolles, on what would later become the Route Napoleon, to greet Mireur's mother. In November 1960, President de Gaulle visited the village to honor his memory.

== In popular culture ==
- In the 1989 film La Révolution française, an unnamed boy of about 10 years old is portrayed whistling La Marseillaise when he runs into a group of enlisted fédérés from Marseille marching to Paris. When a passing soldier stops and gathers some other soldiers around him to ask the boy about the song, the boy responds he heard a carpenter in Strasbourg sing it, and sings the lines: Aux armes, citoyens / Formez vos bataillons / Marchons, marchons !... In the next scene, fédéré companies from all around France marching on Paris are seen adopting the song. The boy is likely a reference to Mireur, who, however, would have been 22 years old at the time.
