= Péter Virágvölgyi =

Hungarian typographer, calligrapher, graphic designer

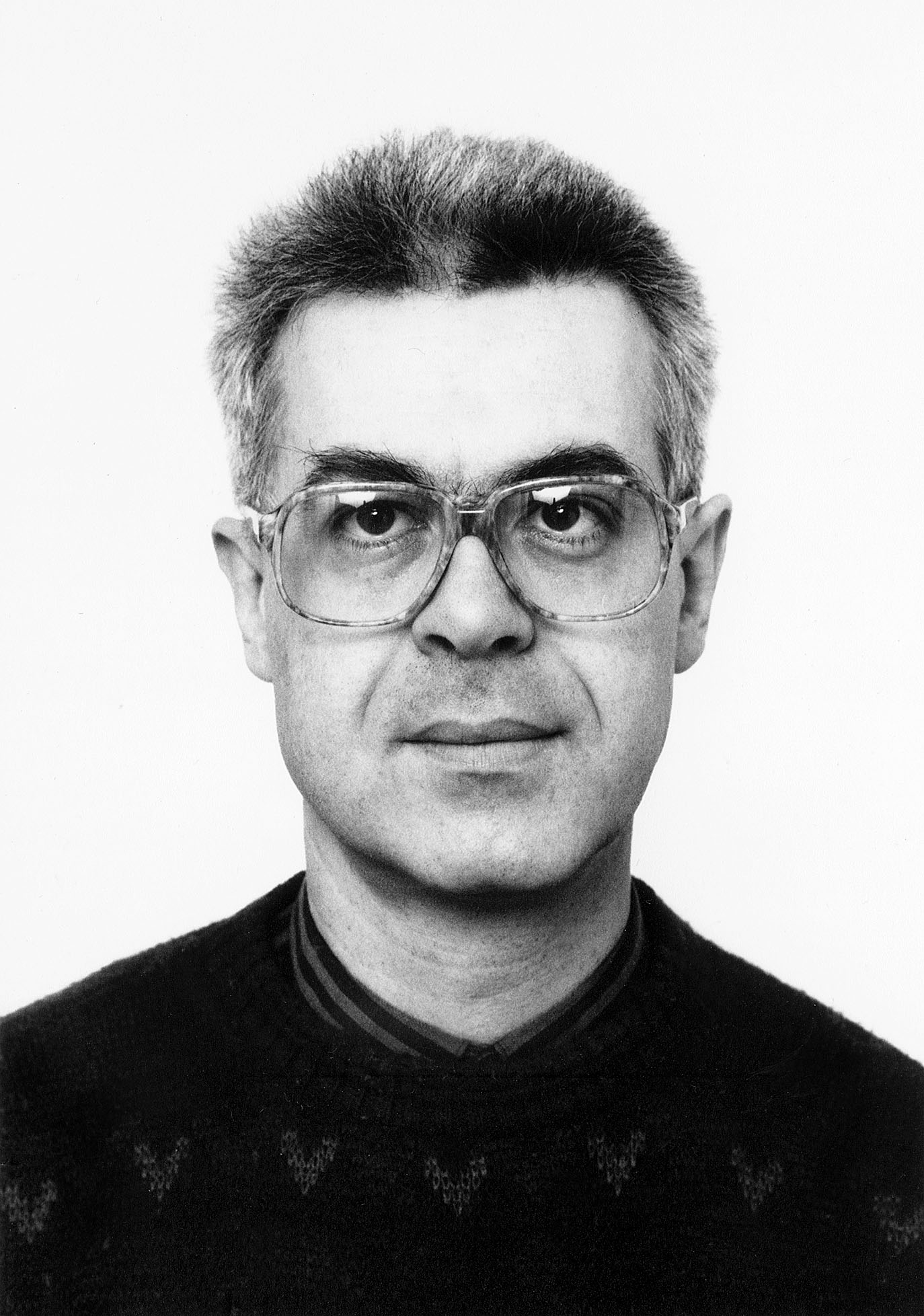
- Born: November 4, 1948; Budapest, Hungary
- Died: July 4, 1998 (aged 49); Perbál, Hungary
- Education: Hungarian Academy of Craft & Design
- Occupations: typographer, calligrapher, graphic designer, associate professor

Péter Virágvölgyi (November 4, 1948 – July 4, 1998) was a Hungarian typographer, calligrapher, graphic designer, associate professor at the Hungarian Academy of Craft & Design. He was the initiator of the italic handwriting curriculum for elementary schools in Hungary, author of the book A tipográfia mestersége számítógéppel (The Craft of Typography with a Computer) and the designer of the Zeebevel font.

== Studies ==
He finished the High School of Fine & Applied Arts (Budapest, Hungary) in 1967. He graduated from the Department of Typo-Graphics of the Hungarian Academy of Craft & Design (Budapest, Hungary) in 1973 as a graphic designer, his master was György Haiman. He wrote his dissertation on shopfront signs, display type designs, calligraphic compositions, posters. The academy published his thesis Proposal for the Reform of Handwriting Education in Elementary Schools.

== Career ==
From 1974 until his death, he lectured about graphic design and typography at the Hungarian Academy of Craft & Design, first as teaching assistant and then as an assistant professor from 1983. In 1987, he was appointed associate professor. He was the Hungarian representative of the official validation session of the new European Design Studies MA program in 1995, at the University of Brighton, UK. In the fall semester of 1997-98 he worked as a visiting professor at the Department of Graphic Design of the Bilkent University in Ankara, Turkey. From 1993 until his death, he was the Head of the Department of Visual Communication of the Hungarian Academy of Craft & Design.

In 1982 he became a member of the Friends of Calligraphy Society (San Francisco, USA). Slides of his work can be found in the calligraphy collection of the San Francisco Public Library. He had been a Hungarian representative of the ATypI group (Association Typographique Internationale) since 1983. In 1991, he was elected to ATypI's international board of directors at the Annual General Meeting in Parma (Italy), becoming chairman of the Research and Education Committee. In 1992 he organized ATypI's eighth international working seminar called the Technology & the Human Hand – The Visual Editing of Written Communication in Budapest.

From 1986 he was a member of the main jury of the Beautiful Hungarian Book Contest, from 1989 to 93 and in 1995 he was its chairman. In 1987 he designed the Hungarian National Gallery’s Kassák Centennial Exhibition in 1987.

In 1997, his design of the book Stefan Zweig: Buchmendel was recognized at the Beautiful Hungarian Book Contest in the category of bibliophilic and special publications. In 1999 he received (posthumously) the Memorial Plaque for Hungarian Higher Education.

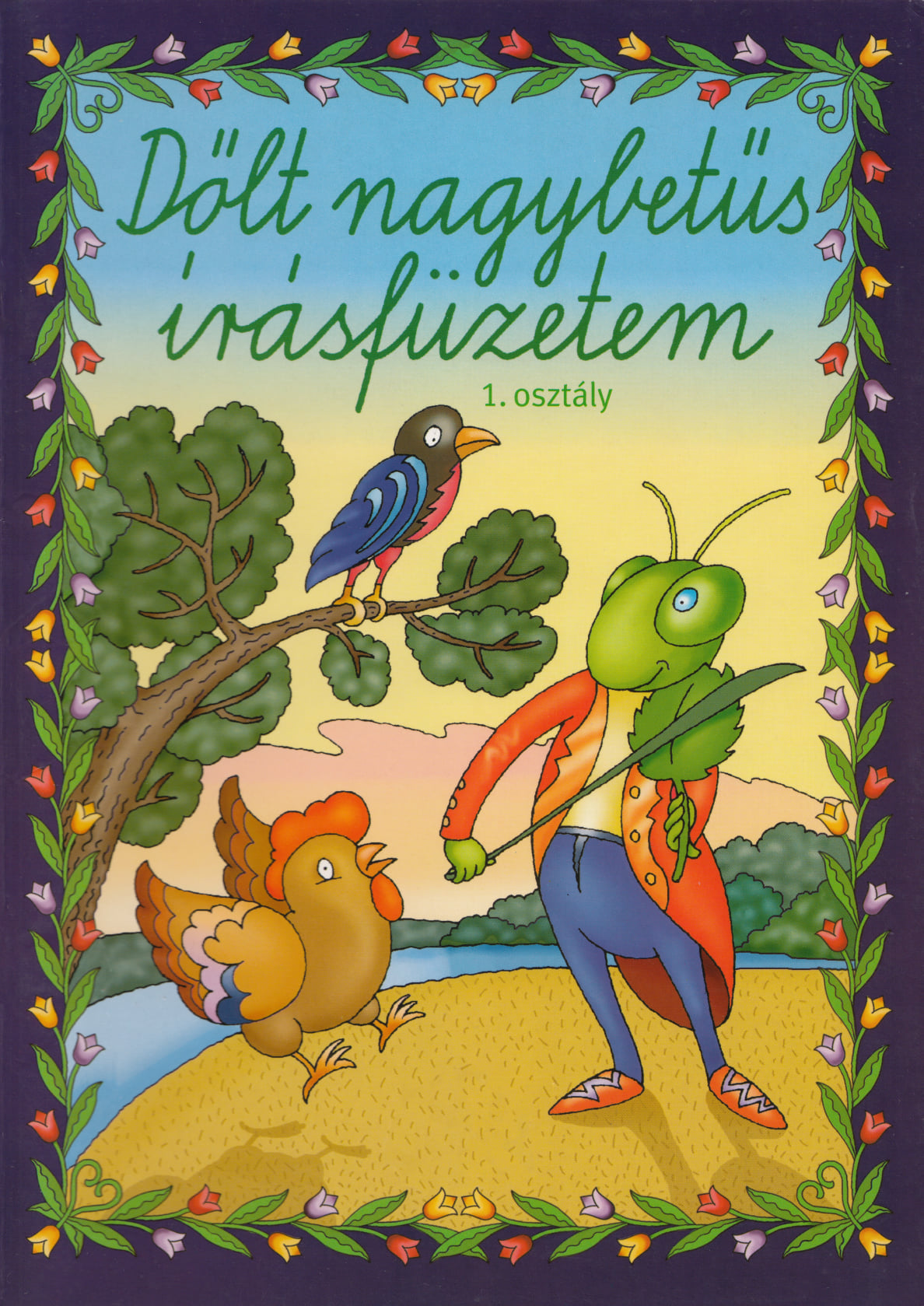
One of Péter Virágvölgyi's italic handwriting textbooks

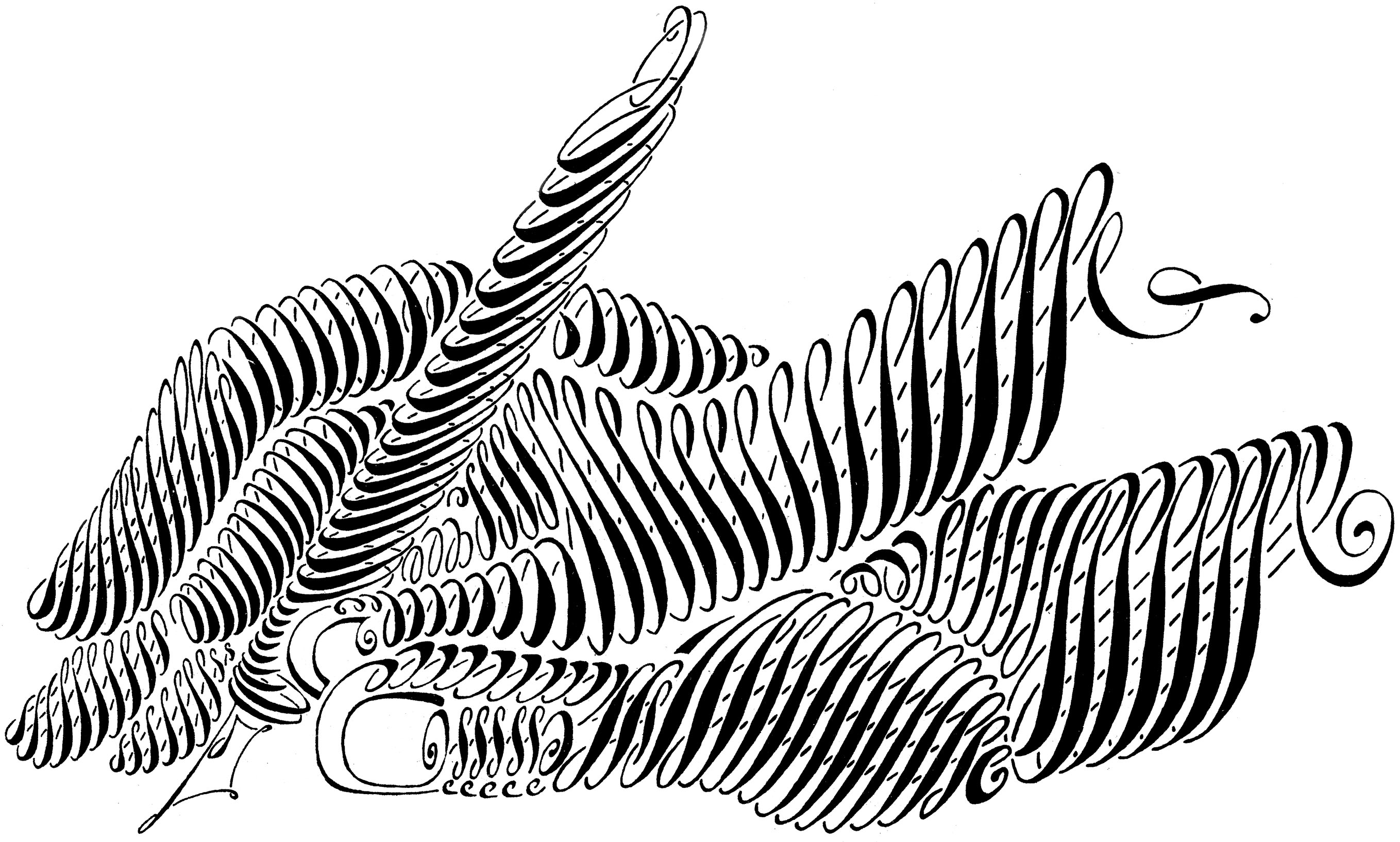
Calligraphy by Péter Virágvölgyi

== Italic handwriting ==
Based on his italic handwriting proposal submitted as his thesis, he became the leader of a teaching experiment that run between 1975 and 1979 under the supervision of the National Pedagogical Institute (OPI) in Hungary (together with psychologist Dr. Róbert Ligeti and head teacher Katalin Kutiné Sahin-Tóth). Between 1985 and 1990, he relaunched teaching experiments in several schools again, on the basis of which italic handwriting was officially adopted by the Hungarian state in 1991 as an electable teaching curriculum.

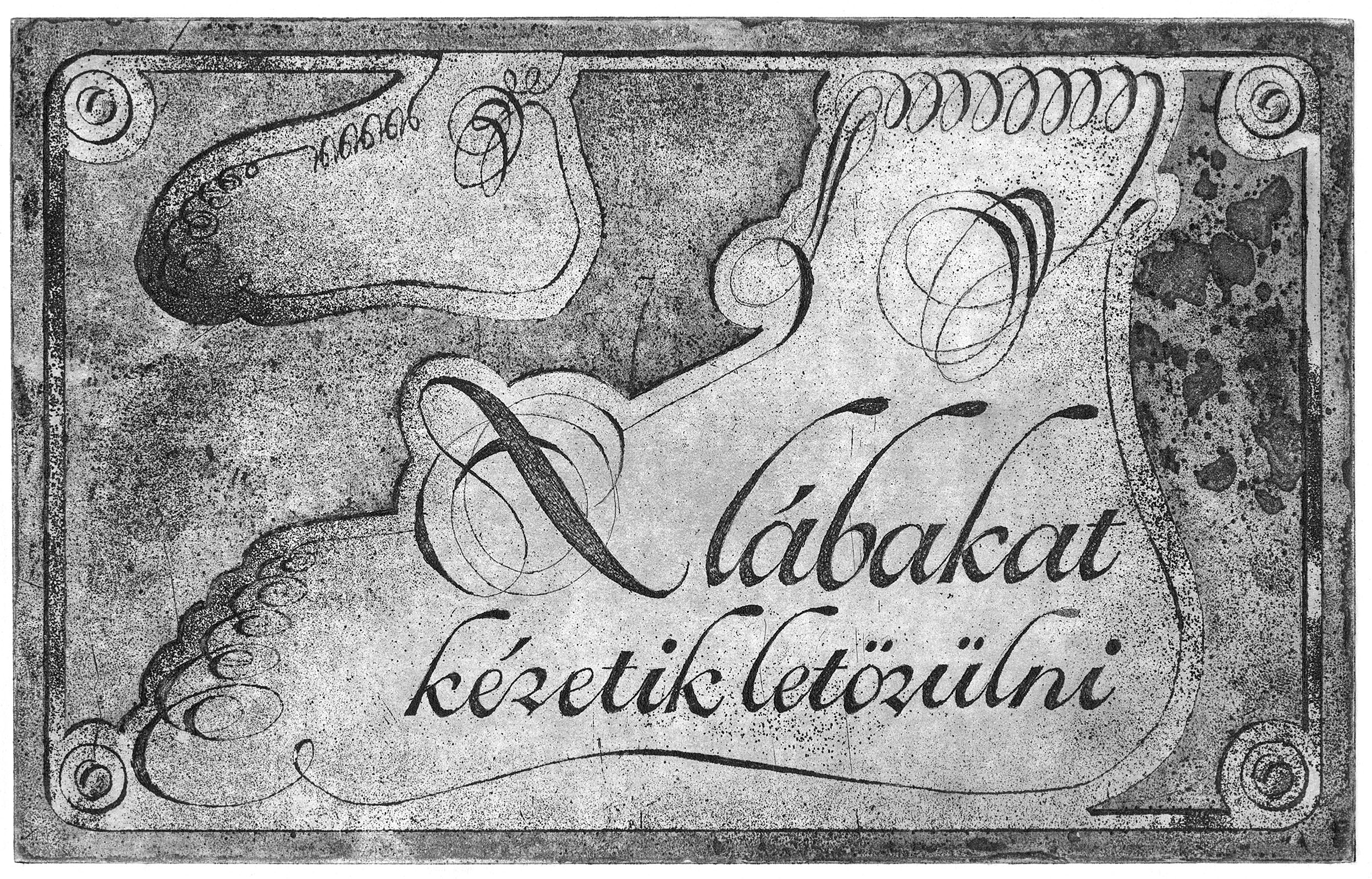
Calligraphic etching by Péter Virágvölgyi (Please wipe your shoes)

== Publications ==
- 1972 Kézírás és kalligráfia. (Handwriting and Calligraphy.) Student project, Hungarian Academy of Craft & Design, Budapest. 24 pages, 16 illustrations.
- 1973 Javaslat az iskolai írástanítás reformjára. (Proposal for the Reform of Handwriting Education in Elementary Schools.) (Thesis). Hungarian Academy of Craft & Design, Budapest. 12 pages, 18 figures.
- 1976 Irástanításunk tegnap, ma, holnap. (Handwriting Education – Yesterday, Today, Tomorrow.) Article in Köznevelés, 18/1976. pp. 9–11. 6 figures.
- 1980 Tervezőművészet és oktatás. (Design and Education.) Article in Pedagógiai Technológia, 1/1980. pp. 33–36.
- 1980 Handwriting in Hungary. Article in the Journal of the Society for Italic Handwriting, 103. London. pp. 17–21. 4 figures.
- 1981 A kézírásról. Morfológiai tanulmány és hozzászólás az írástanítás problémaköréhez. (About Handwriting. A morphological study and a contribution to the problems of handwriting education.) Hungarian Academy of Sciences Institute of Linguistics, Budapest–Veszprém. 43 pages, 70 figures.
- 1988 Tipográfia az “Új művészeti médiumok – a francia vizuális kultúra egy évtizede” kiállításon. (Typography at the Exhibition “New Art Media – A Decade of French Visual Phenomena.”) Article in Ipari Forma, 5–6/1988. p. 26.
- 1988 Az íráskísérletekről. (On experimental handwriting teaching.) Article in A Tanító, 6–7/1988. pp. 19–22. 12 figures.
- 1988, 1989, 1990, 1991, 1992, 1993, 1995 foreword to the catalog of the Beautiful Hungarian Book Contest, Association of Hungarian Publishers and Distributors
- 1991 A dőlt írás tanítása. (Teaching the Slanted Hand.) Teacher's manual. (Ed. and partly written by Katalin Kutiné Sahin-Tóth, Róbert Ligeti.) Pedagogical Centre, Budapest. 104 pages, with many figures.
- 1993 ATypI-rendezvények Budapesten (ATypI seminar in Budapest). Magyar Grafika, 1993/1. 21–28. p., 7 ill.
- 1996 Dőlt kisbetűs írásfüzetem. (My exercise book for lower case italic script) and Dőlt nagybetűs írásfüzetem. (My exercise book for upper case italic script). Celldömölk, Apáczai Publishing House. Textbook for the first grade of elementary schools. The writing designed by Virágvölgyi Péter. Written and edited by Katalin Kutiné Sahin-Tótn. Illustrated by István Kiss.
- 1996 A tipográfia mestersége – számítógéppel. (The Craft of Typography on the Computer. A Manual.) Tölgyfa Publishers, Budapest. 140 pages, with many figures.
- 1997 In memoriam: György Haiman. Article in Type. The Journal of ATypI. 1997/1. 80–83. p., 1 picture.
- 1998 West, Suzanne: Stílusgyakorlatok. A tipográfia és az oldaltervezés hagyományos és modern megközelítése. (as translator) Budapest, UR Publishing House and Multimedia Studio Ltd. 253 p. (Original edition: Working with Style. Traditional and Modern Approaches to Layout and Typography. New York, 1990, Watson–Guptill Publications.)
- 1999 A tipográfia mestersége – számítógéppel. Posthumous edition enlarged with a 3000-article English–Hungarian DTP dictionary. Osiris Publishers (Osiris manuals series), Budapest. 258 pages, with many figures.
