= Amok (1934 film) =

- Directed by: Fyodor Otsep
- Written by: André Lang; H.R. Lenormand
- Based on: Amok by Stefan Zweig
- Starring: Marcelle Chantal; Jean Yonnel; Jean Servais
- Cinematography: Curt Courant
- Music by: Karol Rathaus
- Production company: Pathé
- Release date: September 14, 1934 (Paris)
- Running time: 92 minutes
- Country: France
- Language: French

Amok is a 1934 French film, directed by Fyodor Otsep. The director was nominated for the Mussolini Cup at the 1934 Venice International Film Festival. The film is based on the Stefan Zweig novella Amok.

== Synopsis ==
The film focuses on a physician, Dr. Holk (Miles Mander), in a small Dutch colony in the tropics. A strange illness, known as Amok, is turning innocent people into madmen. When a young woman, Hèlène (Dolly Davis), comes to him asking for an abortion so that her returning husband will not know she has been unfaithful, he refuses. Hélène seeks help elsewhere, leading Dr. Holk to try to find and save her before it's too late.
