= The Kiss (2022 film) =

2022 film directed by Bille August

- Danish: Kysset
- Directed by: Bille August
- Based on: Beware of Pity by Stefan Zweig
- Release dates: 15 October 2022 (WFF); 23 February 2023
- Running time: 100 minutes
- Country: Denmark
- Language: Danish

The Kiss (Danish: Kysset) is a 2022 Danish film directed by Bille August. It is loosely based on Stefan Zweig's novel Beware of Pity.

== Plot synopsis ==
Anton Abildgaard is a noble and dutiful young man whose highest priority is to complete his officer training in the cavalry with the greatest possible honor. While he is engaged in an exercise, he sees Baron von Løvenskjold's car stuck in mud. He orders his platoon to help pull the car out of the mud. As a result, he is invited to a ball at von Løvenskjold's castle. There he meets the baron's beautiful daughter Edith, who is a wheelchair user due to a riding accident. She is unhappy, but when Anton treats her like any other woman, she blossoms, much to her father's delight, and she falls madly in love with him.

Anton feels sorry for Edith, and the more time he spends with her, the more he grows fond of her. However, he finds it difficult to determine whether his feelings are based on pity or genuine love. In his attempt to do the right thing, he digs himself deeper and deeper into promises, lies, and guilt toward Edith and the Løvenskjold family.

== Cast ==
- Esben Smed (Anton)
- Clara Rosager (Edith)
- Lars Mikkelsen (baron von Løvenskjold)
- David Dencik (doctor Faber)
- Rosalinde Mynster (Edith's cousin Anna)
- Klaus Søndergaard (Josef, the butler)
- Kurt Dreyer (colonel Krabbe)
- Henrik Blauner (officer Hardenberg)
- Sara-Marie Maltha (Faber's wife)
- Lane Lind (aunt Lily)
