= Saint-Cézaire-sur-Siagne =

Commune in Provence-Alpes-Côte d'Azur, France

- Commune
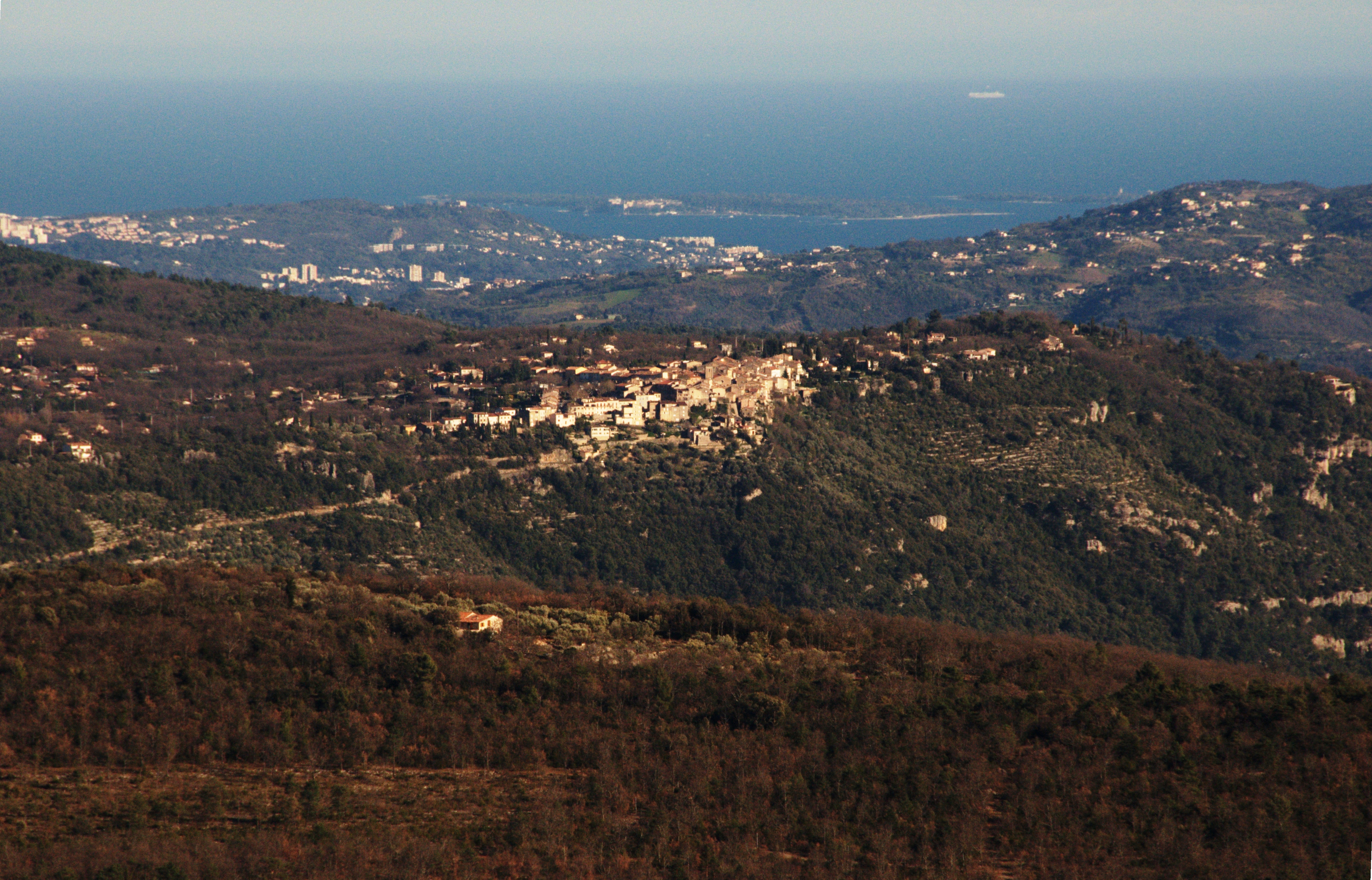
- Saint-Cézaire-sur-Siagne viewed from Mons, Var. Cannes is visible in the background with the islands in the bay.

- Coat of arms
- Location of Saint-Cézaire-sur-Siagne
- Location within France Location within Provence-Alpes-Côte d'Azur
- Coordinates: 43°38′59″N 6°47′37″E
- Country: France
- Region: Provence-Alpes-Côte d'Azur
- Department: Alpes-Maritimes
- Arrondissement: Grasse
- Canton: Grasse-1
- Intercommunality: CA Pays de Grasse

Government
  - Mayor (2026–32): Christian Zedet
- Area^{1}: 30.02 km^{2} (11.59 sq mi)
- Elevation: 500 m (1,600 ft)
- Highest elevation: 771 m (2,530 ft)
- Lowest elevation: 95 m (312 ft)
- Population (2023): 4,056
  - Density: 135.1/km^{2} (349.9/sq mi)
- Time zone: UTC+01:00 (CET)
  - Summer (DST): UTC+02:00 (CEST)
- INSEE/Postal code: 06118 /06530
- ^{1} French Land Register data, which excludes lakes, ponds, glaciers > 1 km^{2} (0.386 sq mi or 247 acres) and river estuaries.

Saint-Cézaire-sur-Siagne (French pronunciation: [sɛ̃ sezɛʁ syʁ sjaɲ], literally Saint-Cézaire on Siagne; Occitan: Sant Cesari de Sianha) is a commune in the Alpes-Maritimes department in southeastern France.

== Geography ==
Far from the major thoroughfares, Saint-Cézaire-sur-Siagne lies halfway between the beaches of the Côte d'Azur and the ski resorts of the Maritime Alps. It is located on a plateau at 475 m. Protected from north winds by the alpine foothills around Grasse, it enjoys an exceptionally tempered climate.

Saint-Cézaire-sur-Siagne is located in the western part of Alpes-Maritimes, perched on a spur that dominates the valley of the Siagne.

Saint-Cézaire lies 15 km southwest of Grasse, 30 km from Cannes, and 52 km from Nice.

On the north are Escragnolles and Saint-Vallier-de-Thiey. To the south are Spéracèdes and Le Tignet. On the southwest are the valley of the Siagne and the massif of Tanneron, which forms the boundary between Alpes-Maritimes and the department of Var.

== Population ==
Historical population

Year	Pop.	±% p.a.
1793	1,099	—
1800	1,006	−1.26%
1806	1,086	+1.28%
1821	1,332	+1.37%
1831	1,216	−0.91%
1836	1,318	+1.62%
1841	1,098	−3.59%
1846	1,278	+3.08%
1851	1,486	+3.06%
1856	1,461	−0.34%
1861	1,417	−0.61%
1866	1,414	−0.04%
1872	1,399	−0.18%
1876	1,319	−1.46%
1881	1,296	−0.35%
1886	1,227	−1.09%
1891	1,256	+0.47%
1896	1,208	−0.78%
1901	1,207	−0.02%

Year	Pop.	±% p.a.
1906	1,240	+0.54%
1911	1,043	−3.40%
1921	754	−3.19%
1926	680	−2.04%
1931	830	+4.07%
1936	689	−3.66%
1946	669	−0.29%
1954	677	+0.15%
1962	715	+0.68%
1968	809	+2.08%
1975	1,046	+3.74%
1982	1,578	+6.05%
1990	2,182	+4.13%
1999	2,840	+2.97%
2007	3,499	+2.64%
2012	3,772	+1.51%
2017	3,908	+0.71%
2023	4,056	+0.62%

Source: EHESS and INSEE (1968-2023)

== See also ==
- Communes of the Alpes-Maritimes department
