= Decisive Moments in History =

History book by Stefan Zweig

- Author: Stefan Zweig
- Original title: Sternstunden der Menschheit
- Language: German
- Genre: Non-fiction
- Publication date: 1927
- English publication date: 1940

Decisive Moments in History (German: Sternstunden der Menschheit, lit. 'Stellar Moments of Humankind') is a 1927 history book by the Austrian writer Stefan Zweig. It started off with only five miniatures in its first edition and grew to a collection of 14 with later editions. Its first English translation was published in 1940 as The Tide of Fortune: Twelve Historical Miniatures. The miniatures relate historical events that changed the world.

== Contents ==
1. Die Weltminute von Waterloo (The World Minute of Waterloo) Napoleon's defeat at the battle of Waterloo.
2. Die Marienbader Elegie (The Elegy of Marienbad). Johann Wolfgang Goethe writes the Marienbad Elegy.
3. Die Entdeckung Eldorados (The Discovery of Eldorado). An employee of John Sutter discovers gold in Nueva Helvecia, starting the California Gold Rush.
4. Heroischer Augenblick (Heroic Moment). The mock execution of Fyodor Dostoyevsky.
5. Der Kampf um den Südpol (The Fight for the South Pole). Robert Scott and his expedition reach the South Pole to find that Roald Amundsen's team arrived first.
6. Flucht in die Unsterblichkeit (Escape to Immortality). Vasco Núñez de Balboa reaches the Pacific Ocean.
7. Die Eroberung von Byzanz (Conquest of Byzantium). Constantinople, the last stronghold of the Byzantine empire falls to the Ottomans.
8. Georg Friedrich Händels Auferstehung (Resurrection of Georg Friedrich Händel). Georg Friedrich Händel recovers and writes The Messiah.
9. Das Genie einer Nacht (The Genius of a [single] Night). Rouget de Lisle writes La Marsellaise.
10. Das erste Wort über den Ozean (The First Word Across the Ocean). Cyrus W. Field establishes the first Trans-Oceanic cable.
11. Die Flucht zu Gott (The Flight to God). An additional act to Leo Tolstoy's The Light Shines in the Darkness.
12. Der versiegelte Zug (The Sealed Train). Vladimir Ilich Lenin boards a train commissioned by the Central Powers to start the Russian Revolution.
13. Cicero (The Head on the Rostrum)
14. Wilson versagt (Wilson's Failure)

Only the first five miniatures were included in the first edition of the book. The second (German) edition of 1940 added those listed above as numbers 6 through to 12. The last two were added to later German editions but were already part of the first English edition published under the title "The Tide of Fortune: Twelve Historical Miniatures".
