= Amok (novella) =

1922 novella by Stefan Zweig

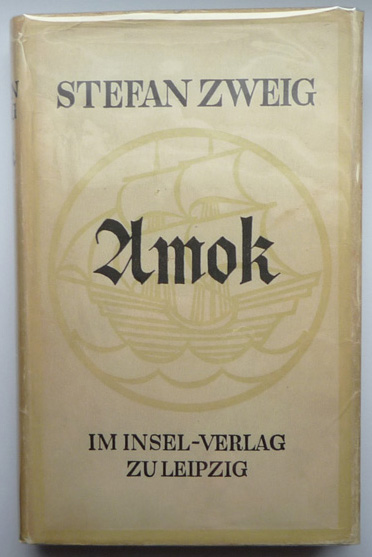
- Author: Stefan Zweig
- Original title: Der Amokläufer
- Language: German
- Genre: Fiction
- Publication date: 1922
- Publication place: Germany

Amok is a novella by the Austrian author Stefan Zweig. First printed in the newspaper Neue Freie Presse in 1922, Amok appeared shortly afterwards in the collection of novellas Amok: Novellas of a Passion. As Zweig was fascinated and influenced by Sigmund Freud's work, Amok includes clear psychoanalytic elements. It deals with an extreme obsession, which leads the protagonist to sacrifice his professional and private life and, eventually, to commit suicide.

The title of the novella comes from the Indonesian-origin term "amok", which was uncommon in those days. It refers to people who attack the enemy in supposedly blind anger and try to kill the enemy as well as anyone else in their way, randomly, without taking into consideration any danger. The actual title is Der Amokläufer an apparent High German neologism from the Indonesian original and the basis of "running amok".

In the novella, as in Moonbeam Alley, Zweig brings the altruistic concerns of the protagonist into the forefront.

== Plot ==
The nameless first-person narrator travels from India to Europe on the ocean liner Oceania in 1912. One night, during a walk on deck, he meets a man who, disturbed and scared, avoids any social contact on the ship. The following night the narrator meets this man again. Although intimidated at first, the man soon begins to trust the narrator and tells him his story.

A physician from Leipzig, he moved to Indonesia seven years earlier to practise medicine in a small and remote village. After some time, the solitude depresses him more and more and he felt “like a spider in its web, motionless for months already.” One day, a white woman, “the first white woman in years,” appears unexpectedly and fascinates him with her haughty and distant nature—something he never experienced with the reverent and submissive indigenous women. In the course of their conversation it becomes clear that the woman, an Englishwoman and wife of a Dutch merchant, has come to see him for a discreet abortion, for which she is willing to pay a large amount of money. However the doctor, struck by a sudden passion, does not want the money. Instead he tells her to ask him for the abortion and suggests that she should visit him again outside his office hours. She refuses and storms out. The obsession seizes the doctor more and more: like a homicidal maniac, he follows the woman to her house, scaring her and making her even more distant. As she does not want her pregnancy to become public, she eventually confides in an indigenous healer. The procedure fails and the woman dies in agony.

In her death throes, she makes the doctor promise to do everything possible to ensure that neither her husband nor anyone else would learn the truth about her cause of death. From then on, the doctor is obsessed with fulfilling the woman’s last wish. He issues a falsified death certificate and when the dead woman’s husband has her transferred to Europe with the cruiser Oceania, the doctor, too, leaves Indonesia on the same liner—sacrificing his career and pension. He wants to prevent further investigations on her cause of death at all costs. On board, he hides from all the other passengers and only leaves his cabin at night in order to avoid meeting the widower.

When the first person narrator offers to help the doctor, the latter categorically turns down the offer, disappearing to be never heard of again. Only at the arrival in Naples, the narrator learns about a mysterious accident that happened while the cargo was being discharged: when the lead coffin with the woman’s remains was being unloaded, the doctor threw himself onto the coffin that was fastened to ropes, thereby dragging both the coffin and him down to the bottom of the sea. Neither could the person running amok be saved nor could the coffin be recovered.

== Adaptations ==
The novel has been adapted five times for film:

Films

- Amok (1927 film)
- Amok (1934 film)
- Amok (1944 film)
- Amok (1977 film)
- Amok (1993 film)
