= Siagne =

River in France

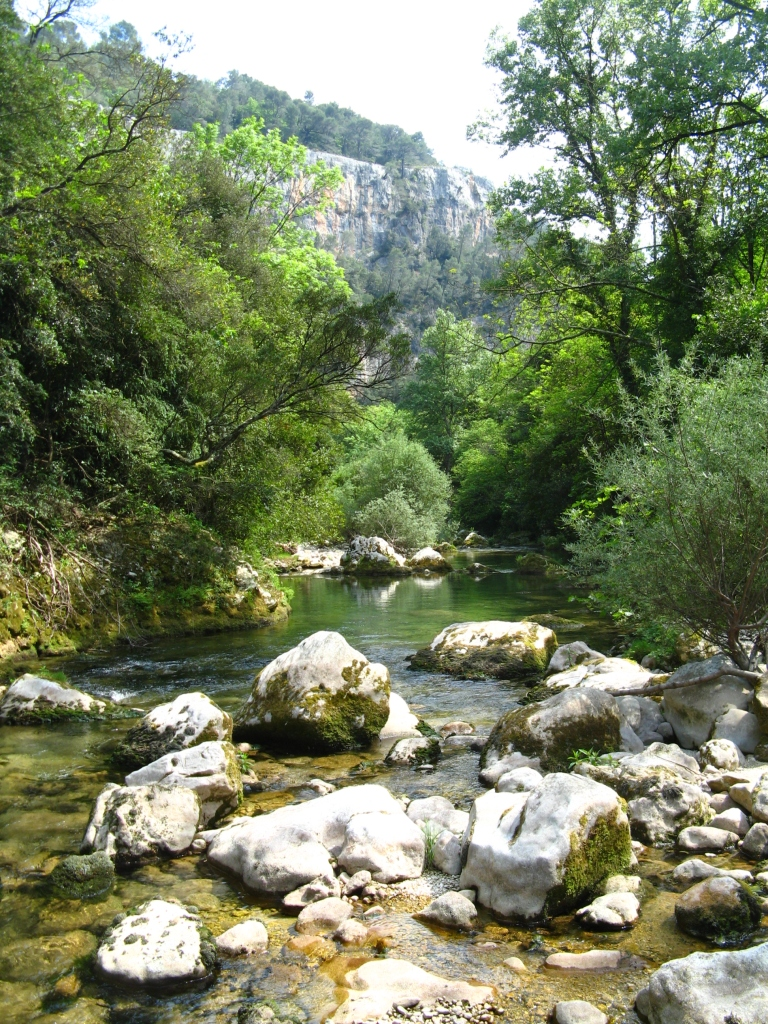
- Gorges of the Siagne

- Native name: La Siagne (French)

Location
- Country: France

Physical characteristics
- Source
  - location: near Escragnolles
  - elevation: 640 m (2,100 ft)
- Mouth
  - location: Mediterranean Sea
  - coordinates: 43.531°N 6.9482°E
- Length: 44 km (27 mi)
- Basin size: 512 km^{2} (198 sq mi)
- Discharge
  - average: Mediterranean Sea

The Siagne (French pronunciation: [sjaɲ]; Occitan: Sianha) is a river that flows through the Var and Alpes-Maritimes departments of southeast France. It is 44.5 km (27.7 mi) long. For much of its length, it forms the border between the two departments. Its drainage basin is 512 km^{2} (198 sq mi). Its source is near Escragnolles, flowing southeast, through Saint-Cézaire-sur-Siagne and Pégomas, and into the Mediterranean Sea in Mandelieu-la-Napoule, 5 kilometres (3 mi) west of Cannes.
