= Friderike Maria Zweig =

Austrian writer (1882–1971)

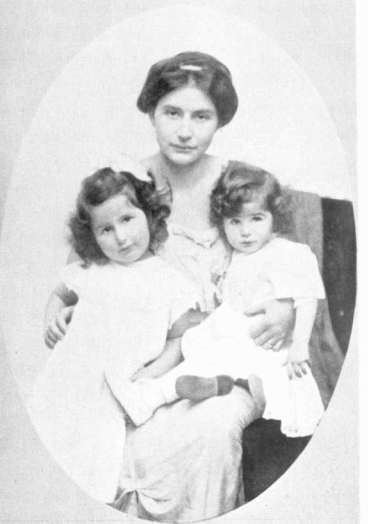
- With daughters, around 1911
- Born: Friderike Maria Burger; 4 December 1882; Vienna, Austria-Hungary
- Died: 18 January 1971 (aged 88); Stamford, Connecticut, U.S.
- Occupation: Writer
- Spouses: Felix Edler von Winternitz; Stefan Zweig (married 1920–1938)
- Children: 2

Friderike Maria Zweig (née Burger; 4 December 1882 – 18 January 1971) was an Austrian writer.

== Early life and education ==
Burger was born into a Jewish family, the daughter of Emanuel and Theresia Burger. She was one of the first women to have been permitted to attend the University of Vienna, where she studied literature and French.

Her first marriage was to Felix Edler von Winternitz, a civil servant. Together they had two daughters, Alexia Elisabeth, born in 1907, and Susana Benedictine, born in 1909.

Her second marriage was to fellow Austrian writer Stefan Zweig.

== Marriage to Zweig ==
She first met Stefan Zweig in 1908, and four years later they started an affair when she was 30 and still married to her first husband. They did not marry for a long time, partially due to divorce being impossible in the Catholic Austro-Hungarian Empire, and married only in 1920 once the Austrian Republic was established. After the wedding they moved into a small house in Salzburg found by Friderike on an earlier visit. During the years of their life in Salzburg, Friderike took on the role of a hostess for many of Zweig's literary friends. Equally, she played a big part in supporting Zweig's artistic endeavours by being the housekeeper and providing help on translations and editing, as well as acting as a support during his bouts of depression and anxiety.

Friderike and Zweig divorced in 1939 and Friderike emigrated to the US in 1940. Friderike died in Stamford, Connecticut, in 1971 where she had lived for many years.

== Work ==
At first, Friderike tried working as a literary journalist, but this did not earn enough money and instead, she started teaching French and history. During her marriage to Zweig she often helped him with research and translation as well as reading books he was sent, making excerpts from them and writing letters of acknowledgement in his name. Friderike was also a founder of the Stefan Zweig Society.

In 1946 Friderike wrote a memoir, Married to Stefan Zweig, recounting the years she spent being married to Zweig. Her correspondence with Zweig from 1912 to 1942 has been translated and published in English.

As a founder of the American-European Friendship Association, Friderike was also known for her work promoting Austrian-American cultural ties, for which she was acknowledged by the Austrian government.
