= Confusion (novella) =

Novella by Stefan Zweig

- Argentine first edition 1944
- Author: Stefan Zweig
- Original title: Verwirrung der Gefühle
- Translator: Eden Paul; Cedar Paul
- Language: German
- Publisher: Insel-Verlag
- Publication date: 1927
- Publication place: Germany
- English publication date: 1927

Confusion (German: Verwirrung der Gefühle), also known in English under the titles Confusion of Feelings or Episode in the Early Life of Privy Councillor D. is a 1927 novella by the Austrian writer Stefan Zweig. It tells the story of a student and his friendship with a professor. It was originally published in the omnibus volume Conflicts: Three Tales, together with two other Zweig novellas, Twenty-Four Hours in the Life of a Woman and Untergang eines Herzens. It was included on Le Monde's 100 Books of the Century list.

== Plot ==
Roland, the narrator, begins the story after he becomes an English professor years after the central action takes place. The novel is written as Roland's response to a biography published about him by his students. His old professor is not mentioned in this biography, and he feels he has to right this. Roland explains that in the early days of his education in Berlin, he spent more time carousing with women than studying. After his father catches him in bed with a girl, he sends him off to university in the country.

At his new university, Roland meets his new professor of English literature, and immediately becomes fascinated by the older man. The professor helps him find a place to stay in the same building where he lives. Roland becomes very close to the professor and is often invited to talk with him in his study. He discovers the fact that the professor has a wife, to whom he is extremely cold.

Roland becomes obsessed with literature, particularly Shakespeare, and with the professor, who becomes a godlike figure to him. He is, however, puzzled by the professor's absences; every once in a while the professor disappears for a few days, leaving his student confused and alone.

One day, whilst swimming, Roland meets a young lady, and, taking a liking to her, offers to accompany her home. To his shock, she leads him to the house in which he lives, and he realizes she is the professor's wife. The two become friends, and she takes care of him whenever the professor leaves.

They soon start inviting him over to dine with them. The atmosphere at dinner is always cold and Roland understands the husband and wife don't have much liking for each other.

As the novella goes on, Roland becomes increasingly desperate. He doesn't understand why the professor seems to have such changing feelings towards him: the professor is extremely close to Roland one day, and the next ignores him.

During one of the professor's absences, his wife and Roland sleep together. Roland, overcome with shame, decides that he has to flee the university. The professor sees him leaving and asks Roland if they can meet before he goes so the professor can explain his behavior. The professor tells Roland that he has always felt attracted to men and that his wife was only a brief distraction. His getaways were a way to satisfy his desires. He opens himself up to Roland completely, and tells him that he loves him.

Roland never sees the professor again, but remembers him fondly, and thinks of him as the person who made him who he is.

== See also ==
- 1927 in literature
- Austrian literature
