= Moonbeam Alley =

Short story by Stefan Zweig

"Monbeam Alley"
- Short story by Stefan Zweig
- Original title: Die Mondscheingasse
- Country: Austria
- Language: German
- Genre(s): Fiction

Publication
- Publication date: 1922

"Moonbeam Alley" (German: Die Mondscheingasse) is a short story by Austrian author Stefan Zweig, first published in 1922.

In the short story, as in Amok, Zweig brings the altruistic concerns of the protagonist into the forefront.

== Plot ==
The narrator is a young German landed in a French port. He misses the train to Germany, as the ship docks at a late hour. Thus, he has to spend a night in a city that is a stranger to him. Walking in the streets of the small city at night, he hears a woman singing Weber's Der Freischütz. Hearing his mother tongue in a French city attracts the young man and he follows the voice to find its source. Eventually, he finds what he is looking for: the voice is from a small bar-like brothel. When he attempts to get in, he suddenly sees a strange man peeking inside. As soon as the man sees him, he runs away. The narrator walks in and sits at one of the tables. It is midnight and he is the only guest at the bar. A fleshy, exhausted prostitute comes to him and orders alcohol with her German accent. The young man is uncomfortable with the bar's sultry atmosphere and the lackadaisical, tired prostitute – he decides to leave. But suddenly, the prostitute comes to life and bursts into laughter by looking at the door – the man who ran away is there again. The prostitute humiliates the man and tries to make him jealous by snuggling the narrator. The narrator feels sorry for the man and can't stand the prostitute's ruthlessness and therefore decides to leave. Walking in the labyrinthine alleys in the moonlight and trying to find his hotel, he suddenly hears a man offering help – it is the man at the bar. While walking together to the narrator's hotel, the strange man begins speaking swiftly. He says that the prostitute is his wife and due to his selfishness, she has left him and that he spent all of his wealth by running after her. The man asks the narrator to talk to his wife to make her return to him. The narrator is stumped and does not respond to any of his requests. The strange man continues talking and says that he can not stand seeing her with other men and that he will not leave her there alive – he talks about the knife he bought that day. The next day, the narrator tries to find the bar but the alleys look quite unfamiliar to him in the daylight. But when he goes by moonlight from his hotel to the night train, he suddenly notices the alley where the bar in. The man is, again, in front of the bar. When the man sees the narrator, he beckons to him. This makes the narrator worry and since he is about to miss the night train, he leaves the bar and the alley mercurially. At the last moment, the narrator hesitates as the man, with something silvery in his hands, determinedly enters the bar.

== Adaptations ==
- 1988: La Ruelle au clair de lune (TV film), by Édouard Molinaro, with Michel Piccoli, Marthe Keller

== See also ==
- 1922 in literature
- Austrian literature
