= Beware of Pity =

1946 film

- Directed by: Maurice Elvey
- Written by: Elizabeth Baron; W. P. Lipscomb; Marguerite Steen
- Based on: Beware of Pity by Stefan Zweig
- Produced by: Maurice Elvey; W. P. Lipscomb
- Starring: Lilli Palmer; Albert Lieven; Cedric Hardwicke; Gladys Cooper
- Cinematography: Derick Williams
- Edited by: Grace Garland
- Music by: Nicholas Brodszky
- Production company: Two Cities Films
- Distributed by: Eagle-Lion Films
- Release date: 22 July 1946
- Running time: 105 minutes
- Country: United Kingdom
- Language: English

Beware of Pity is a 1946 British romantic drama film directed by Maurice Elvey and starring Lilli Palmer, Albert Lieven and Cedric Hardwicke. It is based on the 1939 novel of the same name by Stefan Zweig. A paraplegic young baroness mistakes compassion for love. The film's costumes were designed by Cecil Beaton. It was made by Two Cities Films at Islington Studios. The film was not a great popular success outside the Soviet Union.

== Plot ==
The film opens with a framing device set in post-Second World War Britain. When a young man comes to aged Anton Marek for romantic advice, Marek tells him a story from his own past, which leads to a flashback.

In the days leading up to the First World War, Lieutenant Marek is assigned to an Austro-Hungarian cavalry regiment stationed in a small town. There he meets Baroness Edith de Kekesfalva, a young woman who is a paraplegic as the result of a horse riding accident. Noticing how the young man has cheered up his depressed daughter, Baron Emil de Kekesfalva asks him to spend time with her. Marek finds her company pleasant enough and agrees.

The baron has consulted many renowned doctors in vain; none hold out any hope for his daughter's recovery. Finally, in desperation, he has turned to hardworking, dedicated Dr. Albert Condor, who at least refuses to give up. Condor notices a great improvement in Edith's attitude, which he accurately ascribes to her falling in love with Marek. Marek remains unaware of Edith's feelings for him.

One day, Marek tells the family about a promising treatment in Switzerland, despite Condor's warning to wait until he has had a chance to investigate. Condor later informs him that it cannot help Edith, but by then the damage is done. With the hope of being able to walk again unassisted, Edith reveals her love for Marek. Guilt-ridden, the young man pretends to love her and agrees to marry her after she is cured.

However, when rumors of the engagement leak out, Marek angrily denies them to his questioning, disapproving fellow officers. When he is confronted by his commanding officer, Marek admits the truth. To minimize the scandal, his commander immediately arranges his transfer to another unit far away.

Marek goes to see Condor before he leaves, but the doctor is away. Instead, Condor's blind wife Klara speaks with him. She gets him to recognize that he may love Edith after all. He tries to telephone Edith, but the lines are barred from civilian use because of the assassination of Archduke Franz Ferdinand that same day. Marek must take the train to report for duty with his new unit, but Klara assures him she will see Edith and clear things up.

When Klara visits Edith, she finds her alone on the rooftop terrace of her family's mountainside mansion. Edith has heard about Marek's public denial of their engagement and no longer trusts anyone. With Klara powerless to stop her, she wheels herself to the edge and flings herself over to her death.

== Cast ==
- Lilli Palmer as Baroness Edith de Kekesfalva
- Albert Lieven as Lt. Anton Marek
- Cedric Hardwicke as Dr. Albert Condor
- Gladys Cooper as Mrs. Klara Condor
- Linden Travers as Ilona Domansky, Edith's companion
- Ernest Thesiger as Baron Emil de Kekesfalva
- Emrys Jones as Lt. Joszi Molnar
- Ralph Truman as Maj. Sandor Balinkay
- Fritz Wendhausen as Josef, a Kekesfalva family servant (as Frederick Wendhausen)
- John Salew as Col. Franz Bubencic
- Freda Jackson as Gypsy, a fortune teller who foretells a happy future for Edith
- Gerhard Kempinski as Mayor Jan Nivak

== Reception ==
In The New York Times, Bosley Crowther concluded, "the interminable backing and filling and huffing and puffing that goes on in this film adds up to modern-day tedium". Radio Times wrote, "having learnt his trade in the silent era, director Maurice Elvey can't resist overplaying the melodrama, but the cast - particularly doctor Cedric Hardwicke and his blind wife, Gladys Cooper - keeps things on track". Leonard Maltin called it "maudlin but effective."

TCM wrote, "the film was a failure at the box office in England and stateside critics like Bosley Crowther described it as "tortured" and "tedious". The poor reception nearly permanently stalled Elvey's career: he didn't work again until The Third Visitor (1951)."

== Bibliography ==
- Harper, Sue. The Rise and Fall of the British Costume Film. British Film Institute, 1994.
