= Maria Stuart (biography) =

1935 book by Stefan Zweig

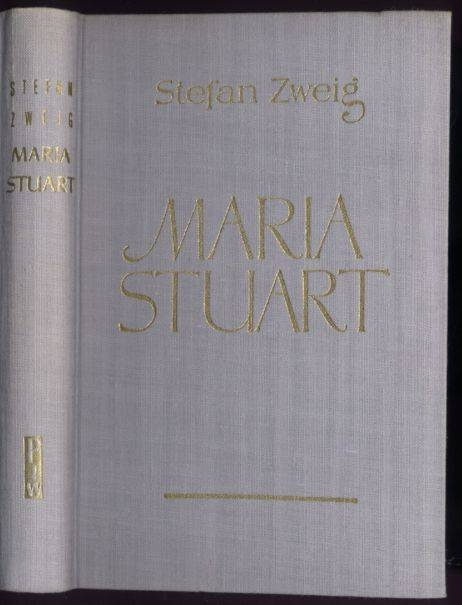

Maria Stuart is a biography of Mary, Queen of Scots, written by Stefan Zweig and published in 1935. It is presented as a tragedy (Dramatis personae at the head of the book). It was translated to English, albeit with radical changes, by husband and wife Eden and Cedar Paul in 1936.

== Content ==
The biography consists of 23 chapters and an epilogue:

1. Queen in the cradle (1542-1548)
2. Youth in France (1548-1555)
3. Queen, widow and queen again (July 1560-August 1561)
4. Return to Scotland (August 1561)
5. First warning (1561-1563)
6. Large political marriage market (1563-1565)
7. Second marriage (1565)
8. The dramatic night of Holyrood (March 9, 1566)
9. The betrayed felons (March–June 1566)
10. Terrible complication (July to Christmas 1566)
11. Tragedy of a passion (1566-1567)
12. The Way of Murder (January 22-February 9, 1567)
13. Quos deus perdere vult (February–April 1567)
14. The dead end (April–June 1567)
15. The dismissal (Summer 1567)
16. Farewell to freedom (Summer 1567-summer 1568)
17. A plot is going on (May 16-June 28, 1568)
18. The net tightens (July 1568-January 1569)
19. The years in the shade (1569-1584)
20. The knife war (1584-1585)
21. We must finish (September 1585 – 1586)
22. Elisabeth against Elisabeth (August 1586-February 1587)
23. "At my end is my beginning" (February 8, 1587)
