= The Light Shines in the Darkness =

Unfinished Tolstoy play

The Light Shines in the Darkness is an unfinished play by Leo Tolstoy, written in 1890. Arguably his most autobiographical piece, the play is said to "mirror Leo Tolstoy’s highly personal dilemma as if seen through the crucible of the family. "
