= Buchmendel =

Short story by Stefan Zweig

The Old-Book Peddler; A Viennese Tale for Bibliophiles
- Author: Stefan Zweig
- Original title: Buchmendel
- Translator: Theodore W. Koch
- Language: German
- Publisher: der Neuen Freien Presse, Northwestern University
- Publication date: 1929
- Publication place: Austria
- English publication date: 1937

"Buchmendel" is a 1929 short story by the Austrian writer Stefan Zweig. It tells the tragic story of an eccentric but brilliant book peddler, Jakob Mendel, who spends his days trading in one of Vienna's many coffeehouses. With his encyclopaedic mind and devotion to literature, the Poland-born Russian-Jewish immigrant is not only tolerated but liked and admired by both the owner of his local Café Gluck and the cultured Viennese clients with whom he interacts in the pre-war period. In 1915, however, he is falsely accused of collaborating with Austria's enemies and is dispatched to a concentration camp. On his return, towards the end of the war, everything has changed. His mind no longer remembers, his eyes can no longer read, the café undergoes new, brittle ownership, and his clientele have disappeared. Jacob Mendel finally dies, destitute, incapacitated and forgotten.

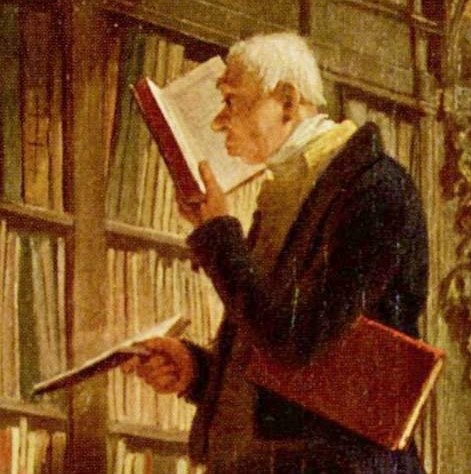
Detail from "The Bookworm" (1850) by Carl Spitzweg

What initially reads as another of the many human dramas that Zweig made his speciality, this small tale actually has a far more panoramic subplot, for it is a metaphor of World War I's impact on Viennese life and culture. It is also particularly interesting to the historian for understanding the strategies by which postwar writers reimagined prewar Vienna, how they conceptualised the war itself, and how memory and myth deeply influenced their conception of history.

"Buchmendel" was translated by Theodore W. Koch as "The Old-Book Peddler: A Viennese Tale for Bibliophiles" in The Old-Book Peddler and Other Tales for Bibliophiles (1937), published by Northwestern University, The Charles Deering Library, Evanston, Illinois.
