= Jeremiah (play) =

Jeremiah: A Drama in Nine Scenes (German: Jeremias: Eine dramatische Dichtung in neun Bildern) is a 1917 play written in German by Stefan Zweig. Written during the First World War, it reflects his pacifist sentiments and Jewish background, and ends with the line "A people can be put in chains, its spirit, never."

Inspired to oppose the propaganda of Austria and Germany after visiting the front during his tenure at the War Archive, he sought to describe the situation of the "defeatist" through the consistent theme of the moral superiority of the defeated in his work. He wished to provide a vision of emerging from the conflict in peace, overcoming defeat by enduring it, using the biblical and particularly Jewish background of constant defeat as a universal force. He called it the most personal and private of his works, together with Erasmus, and the first of his works he thought was "really worth something". He was surprised by the success of the play, published in book form during a highly patriotic and jingoistic time in Austria.

Thomas Adam wrote that Zweig later used the work as a point of departure for addressing the rise of Nazism, culminating in The Royal Game (Schachnovelle, a novella written in 1938–41 and posthumously published in 1942).
