= The Post Office Girl =

1982 novel by Stefan Zweig

- Author: Stefan Zweig
- Original title: Rausch der Verwandlung
- Translator: Joel Rotenberg
- Language: German
- Publisher: S. Fischer Verlag
- Publication date: 1982
- Publication place: Germany
- English publication date: 2008
- Pages: 328
- ISBN: 3-10-097054-3

The Post Office Girl (German: Rausch der Verwandlung, which roughly means The Intoxication of Transformation) is a novel by the Austrian writer Stefan Zweig. It tells the story of Christine Hoflehner, a female post-office clerk in a small town near Vienna, Austria-Hungary, during the poverty-stricken years following World War I. The book was published posthumously in 1982.

== Plot ==
Christine is an Austrian public servant in a post-office job in a poverty-stricken town near St. Pölten in Lower Austria. Her mother is sick and her father had died during World War I. One day, Christine receives a telegram and sends it to her sickly mother. Upon reading the telegram more closely, Christine's mother is overcome by joy, discovering that some unknown relatives from America, Christine's aunt (Claire) and uncle, have offered to take her on an upper-class trip to Pontresina, Switzerland. Christine is initially reluctant to go, but she finally agrees.

Arriving in Switzerland, Christine is stunned by her relative poverty compared to the people staying at the bourgeois Hotel. She feels excluded due to her humble origins. Claire, her aunt from America, decides to transform her into a socialite and to make her more elegant in order to fit in with the bourgeoise society she currently inhabits. Christine changes her name, dress and manner. She feels much happier than she has during those few weeks, enjoying them frenetically. But when her humble origins are eventually discovered, and Christine cannot stay there, Claire cuts short their trip and then returns to America.

Christine returns to her home in Austria, feeling defeated and nostalgic for the time she spent at the Swiss hotel. After comparing her past trip to her current location, an impoverished post-World War I Austrian town, and her current job, she descends into a deep depression, feeling unhappy with both her job and her life. Eventually, she meets Ferdinand, a friend of a poor relative of hers who had fought in World War I, and had been taken as a prisoner of war to Siberia. He is also very poor and has lost all he had before the war. After a few dates, they realize they share a deep depression and decide to commit suicide together, reluctant to do it alone.

After Christine takes care of tying up loose ends in her workplace in preparation for their joint suicide, she then meets Ferdinand to go to the place where they have decided to kill themselves. However, as Ferdinand takes a look at Christine's workplace, he notices a large sum of cash he could steal. After some deliberation, Ferdinand realizes he need not kill himself if he can escape poverty through stealing government money from Christine's post office. They agree to postpone their suicide. After further thought, Ferdinand devises an elaborate plan to commit the robbery and suggests it to Christine. Christine is initially reluctant, but after further planning, she agrees to carry out the robbery.

== Reception ==
Lorna Bradbury of The Daily Telegraph wrote in 2009: "The Post Office Girl is a fine novel – and an excellent place to start if you are new to this great Austrian novelist. It is a powerful social history, describing in moving detail the social impact of the First World War, and the extreme poverty in which so many people were forced to live. ... Zweig succeeded in taking the most complex concepts of psychoanalysis and bringing them vividly to life." John Banville reviewed the book in The Guardian: "The Post Office Girl is fierce, sad, moving and, ultimately, frightening. True, it is over-written – Simenon would have done it better, in half the space – but it is also hypnotic in its downward spiral into tragedy." Ursula K. Le Guin, in Literary Review, called it a "beautiful, risk-taking novel."

There is nothing dated about it. It strikes no self-conscious poses; the language is straightforward, precise, delicate, and powerful. The flow of the story, now lingering, now fast and lively, is under perfect control...The moral desolation of the novel is unsparing, accurate, and absolute. It is far beyond cynicism. It is as irrational and unanswerable as Dostoyevsky.

Jay Nordlinger wrote that the book

is brilliant, or suffused with brilliance... Zweig’s writing is raw and refined at the same time. However elegant, it is honest and penetrating. He is a master of description — physical and mental... What a mind, Zweig’s. What a book, flawed and truncated as it may be.

== In popular culture ==
Wes Anderson based The Grand Budapest Hotel on The Post Office Girl and Beware of Pity.

== See also ==
- 1982 in literature
- Austrian literature
