= Beware of Pity (novel) =

1939 novel by Stefan Zweig

- Cover of the New York Review Books edition published in 2006
- Author: Stefan Zweig
- Original title: Ungeduld des Herzens
- Translator: Phyllis Blewitt; Trevor Eaton Blewitt; Anthea Bell
- Language: German
- Publisher: S. Fischer Verlag
- Publication date: 1939
- Publication place: Germany
- English publication date: 1939; Cassell (UK); Viking Press (US)
- Pages: 386

Beware of Pity (German: Ungeduld des Herzens, literally Impatience of the Heart) is a 1939 novel by Austrian writer Stefan Zweig. It is a story of well-intentioned pity that spirals into tragedy. At the time of the book's publication, Zweig enjoyed an international reputation as an author of short stories, novellas, and popular histories and biographies. Beware of Pity was to be his only novel published during his lifetime, and has been adapted for stage and screen.

== Plot summary ==
In early 20th century Austria, 25-year-old lieutenant Anton "Toni" Hofmiller is stationed with his cavalry regiment in a garrison town near the Hungarian border. He is invited to the castle of the wealthy, elderly Hungarian Lajos von Kekesfalva. During post-dinner musical entertainment, Toni asks Kekesfalva's 17-year-old daughter Edith to dance. She had been seated all evening at the dinner table, and he did not notice she is paralyzed from the waist down (the result of a childhood fall from a horse). She weeps inconsolably at the perceived slight, and Toni is filled with embarrassment; he rushes out of the castle. Shortly afterwards, he sends her flowers, hoping the Kekesfalvas will forgive his indiscretion. To his surprise, he is immediately invited back to the castle for tea, where he is warmly welcomed.

He begins to visit the Kekesfalvas every day. He is lavished with the finest foods and liquors. He develops a mild affection for the stricken girl. She meanwhile falls madly in love with him, but such a possibility never occurs to him. Herr von Kekesfalva praises Toni's magnanimity at every opportunity. One day he requests a favor of the young lieutenant. Kekesfalva is worried that Dr. Condor, Edith's doctor, has not been truthful when claiming her condition is improving and may eventually be cured. Kekesfalva asks Toni, as a neutral third party, to casually inquire during the doctor's next visit about her actual chances for full recovery.

When Condor comes to the castle for dinner, Toni suggests walking with the doctor back into town. During their talk, Condor alludes to Herr von Kekesfalva's ignoble past, and offers to tell the whole story rather than have Toni hear a mangled version through gossip. Condor recounts Kekesfalva's early years as an unscrupulous businessman who swindled the late heiress of the Kekesfalva castle out of her land and fortune before being moved by compassion to marry her. He became a devoted husband, and father to Edith. Toni is disturbed by the story but still manages to fulfill his assigned task and inquire after the true state of Edith's condition. Condor expresses his belief that no one is incurable given the rapid advances in medical science; however, there is little likelihood that Edith will ever walk again. He offhandedly mentions an experimental treatment recently touted by a French doctor in a medical journal, although Condor is unsure whether the treatment would be applicable to Edith's particular case.

After parting from Condor, Toni is stopped on his way home by an agitated Herr von Kekesfalva, who is anxious to find out the results of Toni's conversation. Toni tries to calm him down, but out of pity he lies and says there is a new treatment, available in a Swiss clinic, which Condor is confident will completely cure Edith. Kekesfalva is overjoyed at the news and rushes home to wake Edith up. She too is initially overjoyed, and the castle is filled with an air of happiness. Hoping her high spirits will improve her condition, and worrying that disappointment could kill her, Condor agrees to let the lie go on as long as Toni takes responsibility for confessing if necessary. Edith comes to suspect that the treatment is just a ruse for Toni to send her away despite his insistence to the contrary. When she unexpectedly kisses him on the mouth, he recognizes to his dismay that she has fallen in love with him. At first he arranges to flee, but Condor tells him if he departs now, he will effectively be her murderer; instead he must comfort her at least until she leaves for Switzerland. Out of pity for Kekesfalva, and for Edith who seems suicidal, Toni promises to marry her when she is recovered after the treatment. However, fearing ridicule from his army colleagues, he denies the engagement in public.

Realizing the mess he's made and the disgrace he's brought his regiment by lying, Toni requests a transfer. He soon leaves town, but his conscience catches up to him as he waits for a train in Vienna. At one of the stops, he sends a hasty telegram to the castle, explaining that he's been transferred but still intends to keep his promise to Edith. Unbeknownst to him, Archduke Franz Ferdinand was assassinated that day and all communication lines in Austria are busy; Toni's telegram is never delivered. When Edith learns of his departure, and of his public denial of their engagement, she takes her own life. Toni enters the Great War blinded by guilt but mechanically following orders.

== Background ==
The novel was composed over a period of several years, and finally completed in 1938. Among Zweig's papers, literary scholars have found eleven volumes of notes and drafts pertaining to Beware of Pity, which attest to the author's meticulous work on what would be his only full-length novel to be published before his death in 1942.

In the book's epigraph, Zweig writes that there are two kinds of pity (note: this text also appears in a speech by Dr. Condor); the first he calls "the weak and sentimental kind, which is really no more than the heart's impatience to be rid as quickly as possible of the painful emotion aroused by the sight of another's unhappiness". The second, "the only kind that counts", "knows what it is about and is determined to hold out, in patience and forbearance, to the very limit of its strength and even beyond." Toni Hofmiller's pity illustrates the first kind.

In the Introduction, Zweig says the novel is based on a true story he heard during a visit to Vienna. At a restaurant he was introduced to a decorated officer, and renowned war hero, serving in the Austrian Commissariat. Zweig subsequently struck up a conversation with the officer, who confessed his discomfort with being feted as a hero when he had a less-than-courageous incident in his past. He then unburdened himself to Zweig, who writes:

I have only made a few changes in his narrative (I need scarcely add it was not related to me at a single interview), such as putting Uhlans instead of Hussars, so as to conceal the identity of the various garrisons, and, of course, changing the names of people and places. But in no instance have I added anything essential of my own invention, and it is not I but the man who lived the story who now narrates it.

== Reception ==
The Gazette in Montreal asked, "Who would ever believe that Pity, usually a meritorious attribute, could be so vividly analyzed and become a shortcoming instead of a virtue. Yet, this is what Mr. Zweig has done in his thesis on the subject." The review concluded that Zweig's first attempt at the long novel form "has the advantage of being written by an old master. It is a powerful book, an absorbing novel, and above all, a wealth of philosophic understanding."

In summarizing the novel, The Philadelphia Inquirer stated that "Weakness, rather than evil, causes most of the tragedy in the world...and no one is so weak as the human being who thoughtlessly and sentimentally turns on the tap of pity. Just such a thoughtless and sentimental person—although fundamentally good and well-meaning—is Anton Hofmiller, our hero, if that is what he can be called." The review added that Zweig writes "brilliantly and powerfully, whether he is probing human frailties with his sharp knife, or describing barrack room conviviality. The translation by Phyllis and Trevor Blewitt is excellent.... Beware of Pity, in short, is a rare book."

In later decades, the novel was reissued by various publishers and given fresh appraisals by critics. After Pushkin Press published it in 2003, with a new translation by Anthea Bell, Anthony Daniels wrote in the Sunday Telegraph:

One of the recurring subjects of Zweig's fiction is passionate obsession.... What is so impressive about Beware of Pity is Zweig's ability to make us feel the violently shifting emotions of all his characters as if they were our own. Only a writer of great sensitivity could do this. His theme, or moral – which he does not obtrude on us in any clumsy way – is that impulsive pity for others is a dangerous emotion which embroils us in false situations, often with disastrous results.

In her Introduction to the 2006 edition from New York Review Books, Joan Acocella noted that Zweig, a friend and admirer of Sigmund Freud, often depicted characters driven by their psychological impulses. As an example, Acocella cited the fated, tragic ending in Beware of Pity:

Hofmiller defects; Edith commits suicide; Hofmiller spends the rest of his life in shame and despair. That very fatedness, not just in Beware of Pity but in his stories too, has been held against Zweig. A number of critics have remarked on the lock-step progression of his plots and, correspondingly, on the psychological fixity of his characters. His fictional writings are in some measure case histories, textbook portraits of neurosis, Hofmiller's indecision and Edith's guilt-wielding being prime examples. To my mind, however, Edith's character—her unlovability, even as she needs and demands to be loved—is a wonderfully bold stroke, opening up whole caverns of psychological meaning. The outcasts of the world "desire with a more passionate, far more dangerous avidity than the happy," Hofmiller says. "They love with a fanatical, a baleful, a black love."

In a 2011 retrospective article, Nicholas Lezard wrote that "Beware of Pity has moments of high melodrama that have the power to make one put one's free hand over one's mouth as one reads – a very necessary process, and the stripping away of illusions was, after all, one of the abiding aims of the Freudian project. And it is a very useful kind of bildungsroman, in which it is not only the chief character who learns something by the end of it, but the reader, too."

== Adaptations ==
A British-made film adaptation titled Beware of Pity was released in 1946. It starred Lilli Palmer as Edith de Kekesfalva, and was directed by Maurice Elvey.

In 1960, Mexican director Tito Davison adapted the novel, with screenwriter Edmundo Báez, into the film Impaciencia del corazón (Impatience of the Heart).

In 1970, Bilge Olgaç adapted and directed a Turkish version called Merhamet (Pity) with Türkan Şoray in the lead role.

The Russian miniseries Love for Love (Любовь за любовь, 2013) was derived from Beware of Pity, but the story was transposed to a Russian setting and given an ambiguous ending.

Wes Anderson loosely based his film The Grand Budapest Hotel (2014) on Beware of Pity, and on Zweig's posthumously published novel The Post Office Girl.

In 2017, Beware of Pity was adapted as a stage play, directed by Simon McBurney, and produced at the Barbican Centre in London.

The 2022 Danish film Kysset (The Kiss), directed by Bille August, was based on Beware of Pity but is set in Denmark. In this adaptation, August and co-screenwriter Greg Latter made small modifications to the story so that the film would be more suitable for Danish conditions.

== See also ==
- 1939 in literature
- Austrian literature
