= Escragnolles =

Commune in Provence-Alpes-Côte d'Azur, France

- Commune
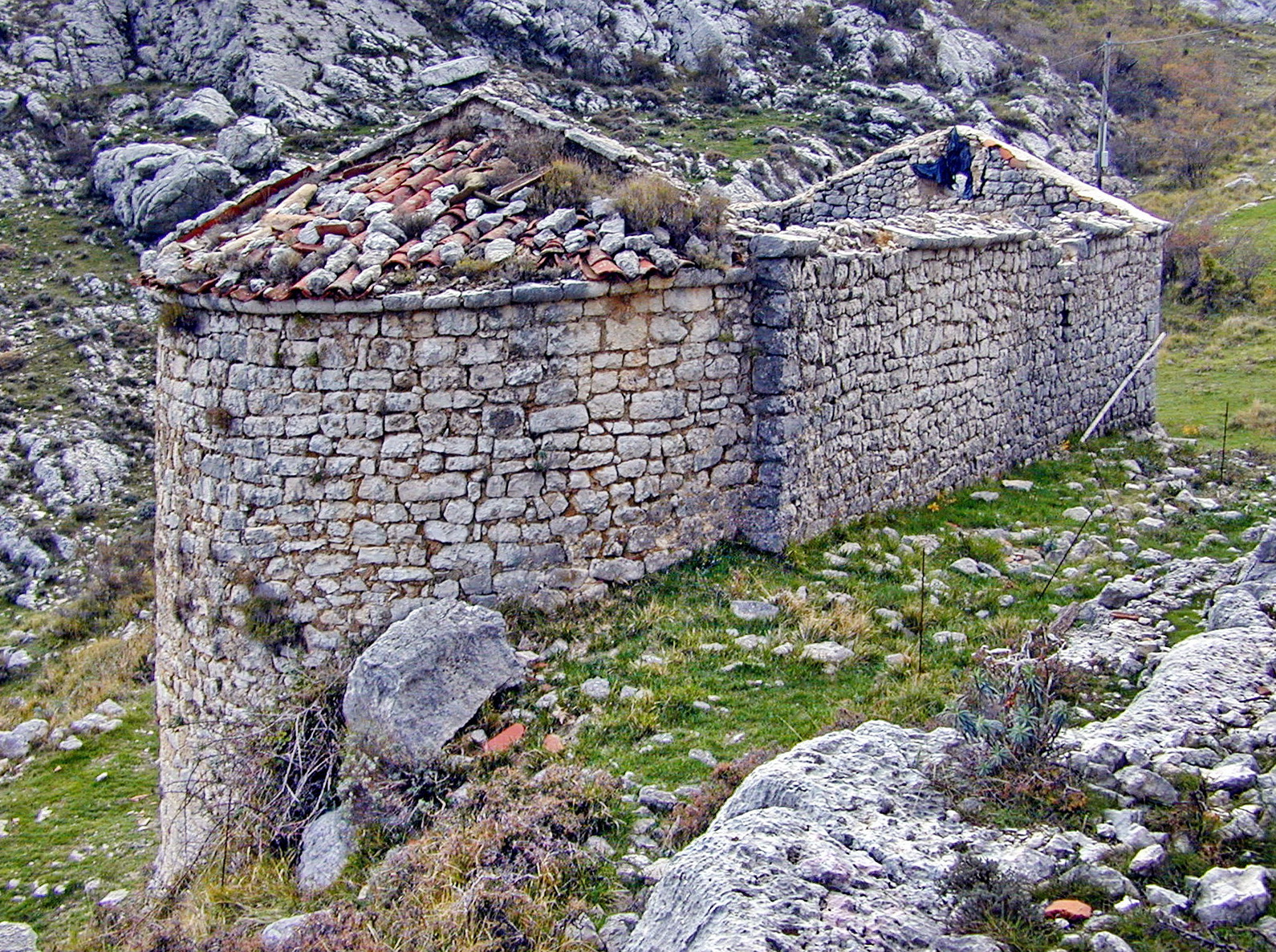
- Chapel of Saint Martin

- Coat of arms
- Location of Escragnolles
- Location within France Location within Provence-Alpes-Côte d'Azur
- Coordinates: 43°43′54″N 6°47′02″E
- Country: France
- Region: Provence-Alpes-Côte d'Azur
- Department: Alpes-Maritimes
- Arrondissement: Grasse
- Canton: Grasse-1
- Intercommunality: CA Pays de Grasse

Government
  - Mayor (2026–32): Henri Chiris
- Area^{1}: 25.48 km^{2} (9.84 sq mi)
- Highest elevation: 1,644 m (5,394 ft)
- Lowest elevation: 400 m (1,300 ft)
- Population (2023): 622
  - Density: 24.4/km^{2} (63.2/sq mi)
- Time zone: UTC+01:00 (CET)
  - Summer (DST): UTC+02:00 (CEST)
- INSEE/Postal code: 06058 /06460
- ^{1} French Land Register data, which excludes lakes, ponds, glaciers > 1 km^{2} (0.386 sq mi or 247 acres) and river estuaries.

Escragnolles (French pronunciation: [ɛskʁaɲɔl]; Occitan: Escranhòla) is a commune in the Alpes-Maritimes department in southeastern France.

== Landmarks ==
The Church of Saint Martin, which dates to the 16th and 18th centuries, and the remnants of an ancient feudal castle. The area is also rich in natural features, such as caves, springs, and the Colerte dolmen situated at an altitude of 955 meters

== Geography ==
The commune is mountainous and includes the gorge of the Siagne.

== Population ==
Historical population
Year	Pop.	±% p.a.
1968	119	—
1975	110	−1.12%
1982	193	+8.36%
1990	326	+6.77%
1999	384	+1.84%
2007	519	+3.84%
2012	620	+3.62%
2017	609	−0.36%
2023	622	+0.35%
Source: INSEE

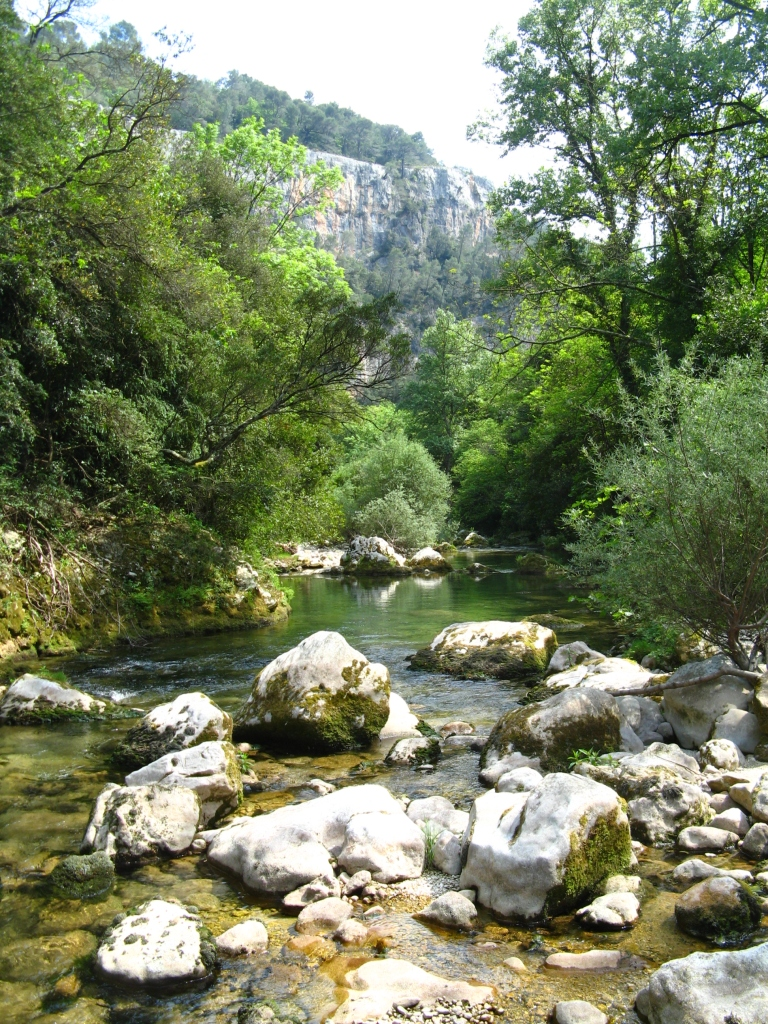
Gorge of the Siagne

== See also ==
- Communes of the Alpes-Maritimes department
