= Stefan Zweig =

Austrian writer (1881–1942)

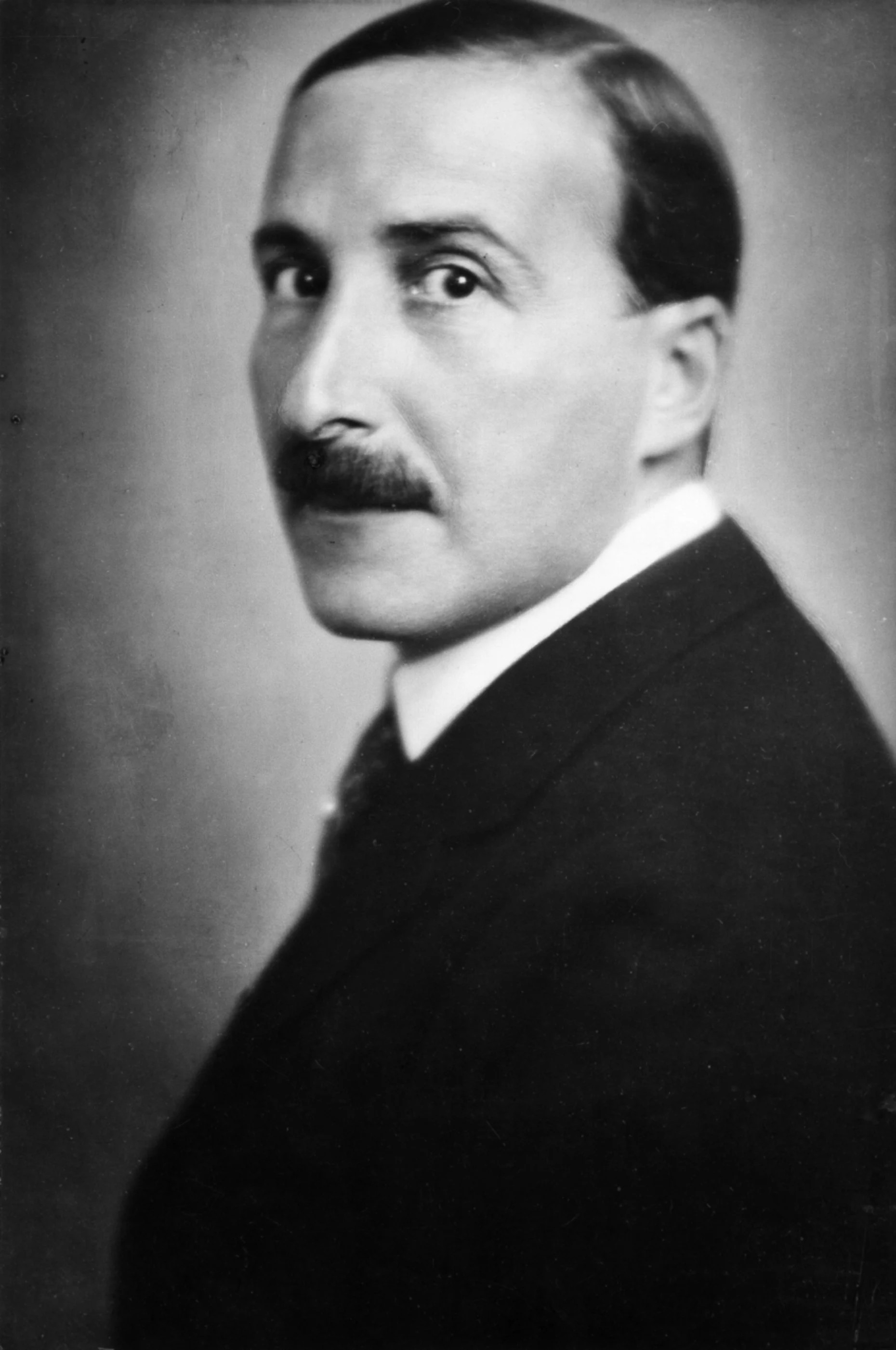
- Zweig c. 1927
- Born: 28 November 1881; Vienna, Austria-Hungary (present-day Austria)
- Died: 22 February 1942 (aged 60); Petrópolis, Rio de Janeiro, Brazil
- Education: University of Vienna (PhD, 1904)
- Occupations: Novelist; playwright; librettist; journalist; biographer; writer; author; historian
- Spouses: Friderike Maria Burger (m. 1920; div. 1938); Lotte Altmann (m. 1939)

Stefan Zweig (/zwaɪɡ, swaɪɡ/ ZWYGHE, SWYGHE; German: [ˈʃtɛfan t͡svaɪ̯k] or Austrian German: [t͡svaɪ̯g]; 28 November 1881 – 22 February 1942) was an Austrian writer. At the height of his literary career in the 1920s and 1930s, he was one of the most widely translated and popular writers in the world.

Born into a Jewish family, Zweig was raised in Vienna, Austria-Hungary. He wrote studies of famous literary figures, such as Honoré de Balzac, Charles Dickens, and Fyodor Dostoevsky in Drei Meister (1920; Three Masters), and of historical events in Decisive Moments in History (1927). He wrote biographies of Joseph Fouché (1929), Mary Stuart (1935) and Marie Antoinette (Marie Antoinette: The Portrait of an Average Woman, 1932), among others. Zweig's best-known fiction includes Letter from an Unknown Woman (1922), Amok (1922), Fear (1925), Confusion of Feelings (1927), Twenty-Four Hours in the Life of a Woman (1927), the psychological novel Ungeduld des Herzens (Beware of Pity, 1939), and The Royal Game (1941).

In 1934, as a result of the Nazi Party's rise in Germany and the establishment of the Ständestaat regime in Austria, Zweig emigrated to England and then, in 1940, moved briefly to New York and then to Brazil, where he settled. In his final years, he would declare himself in love with the country, writing about it in the book Brazil, Land of the Future. Nonetheless, as the years passed Zweig became increasingly disillusioned and despairing at the future of Europe, and he and his wife Lotte were found dead of a barbiturate overdose in their house in Petrópolis on 23 February 1942; they had died the previous day. His work has been the basis for several film adaptations. Zweig's memoir, Die Welt von Gestern (The World of Yesterday, 1942), is noted for its description of life during the waning years of the Austro-Hungarian Empire under Franz Joseph I and has been called the most famous book on the Habsburg Empire.

== Biography ==
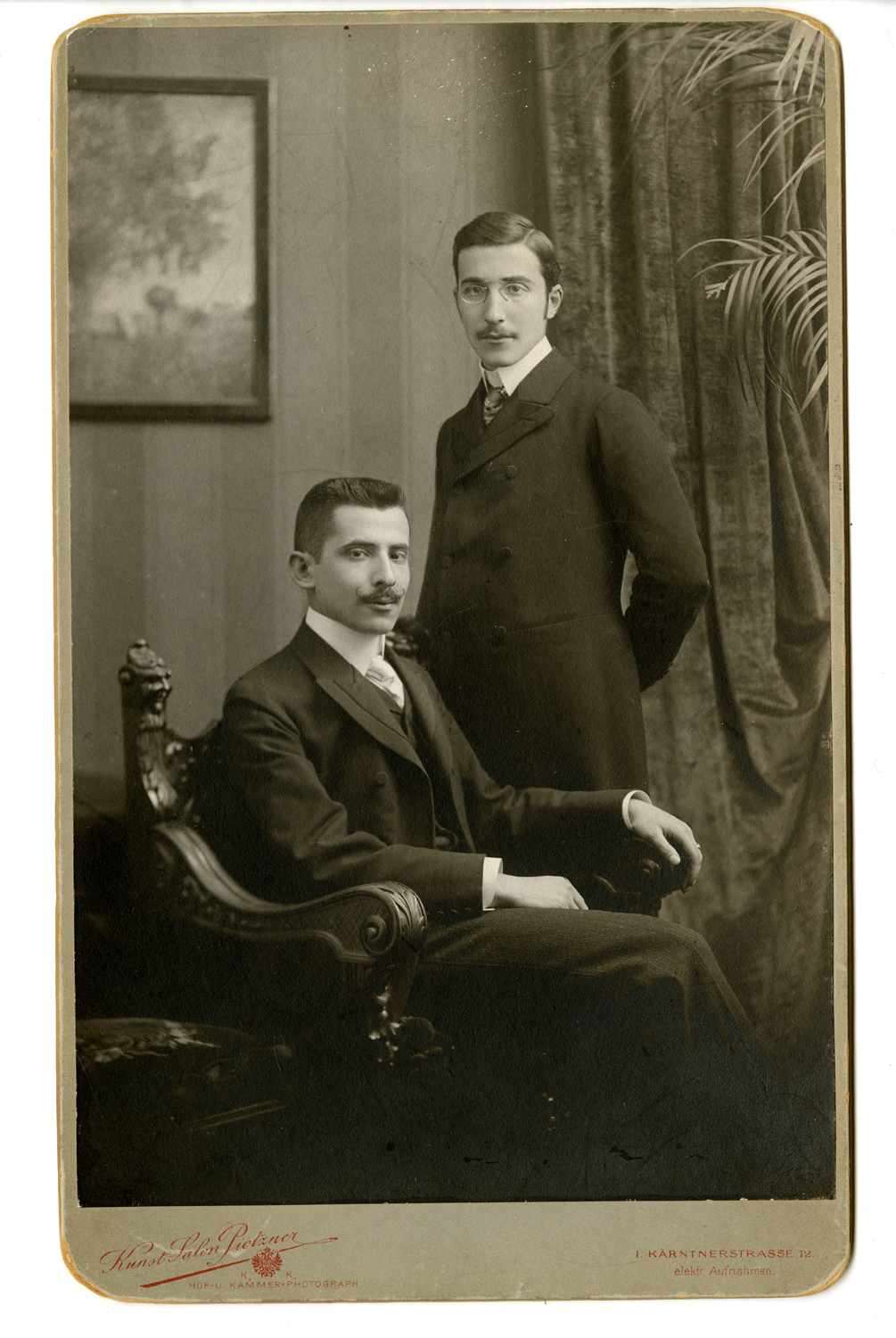
Zweig (standing) in Vienna with his brother Alfred (1879–1977), c. 1900

Zweig was born in Vienna, the son of Ida Brettauer (1854–1938), a daughter of a Jewish banking family, and Moritz Zweig (1845–1926), a wealthy Jewish textile manufacturer. He was related to the Czech writer Egon Hostovský, who described him as "a very distant relative".

Zweig studied philosophy at the University of Vienna, and in 1904 earned a doctoral degree with a thesis on "The Philosophy of Hippolyte Taine". Religion did not play a central role in his education. "My mother and father were Jewish only through accident of birth", Zweig said in an interview. Yet he did not renounce his Jewish faith and wrote repeatedly on Jews and Jewish themes, as in his story Buchmendel. Zweig had a warm relationship with Theodor Herzl, the founder of Zionism, whom he met when Herzl was still literary editor of the Neue Freie Presse, then Vienna's main newspaper; Herzl accepted for publication some of Zweig's early essays. Zweig, a committed cosmopolitan, believed in internationalism and in Europeanism, as The World of Yesterday, his autobiography, makes clear: "I was sure in my heart from the first of my identity as a citizen of the world."

Zweig served in the Archives of the Ministry of War and supported Austria's war efforts through his writings in the Neue Freie Presse and frequently celebrated in his Diaries the capture and massacre of opposing soldiers (for instance, writing about the innumerable citizens killed at gunpoint under the suspicion of espionage that "what filth has made ooze must be cauterized with scalding iron".) Zweig viewed Serbian soldiers as "hordes" and stated that "one feels proud to talk German" when thousands of French soldiers were captured in Metz. Conversely, in his memoirs, The World of Yesterday, Zweig portrays himself in the role of pacifist at the time of the First World War, states that he refused "to participate in those rabid calumnies against the enemy" (although, through his work in the official Neue Freie Presse, Zweig promoted the war propaganda issued from the Austrian crown) and affirms that among his intellectual friends he was "alone" in his stance against the war.

Zweig married Friderike Maria von Winternitz (born Burger) in 1920; they divorced in 1938. As Friderike Zweig she published a book on her former husband after his death. She later also published a picture book on Zweig. They lived in Salzburg in a large but famously inaccessible home later bought by Wolfgang Porsche named "Paschinger Schlössl" which had previously been occupied by Wolfgang Amadeus Mozart's sister, Nannerl. In September 1939, Zweig married his secretary Elisabet Charlotte "Lotte" Altmann in Bath, England. Zweig's secretary in Salzburg from November 1919 to March 1938 was Anna Meingast (13 May 1881, Vienna – 17 November 1953, Salzburg).

=== Leaving Europe after the rise of Hitler ===
Penultimate page from the Gestapo's 'Black Book' (Sonderfahndungsliste G.B., page 231 Z) listing Zweig along with his full London address.

Zweig's high profile did not shield him from the threat of persecution as a Jew. In 1934, after Hitler's rise to power in Germany, and following the establishment of the Austrofascist political regime known as the Ständestaat, Zweig left Austria for England, living first in London, and later in Bath, where he remarried. But England was not far enough away from the Nazi threat for Zweig; in 1940 he and his second wife crossed the Atlantic to the United States, settling in New York City. It turned out that Zweig was correct to fear being targeted by the Nazis, even in England: as part of the preparations for their invasion of England – known as Operation Sealion – the SS had prepared a list of persons in the UK who were to be detained immediately. This so-called Black Book came to light after the war; Zweig was listed on page 231, including his London address.

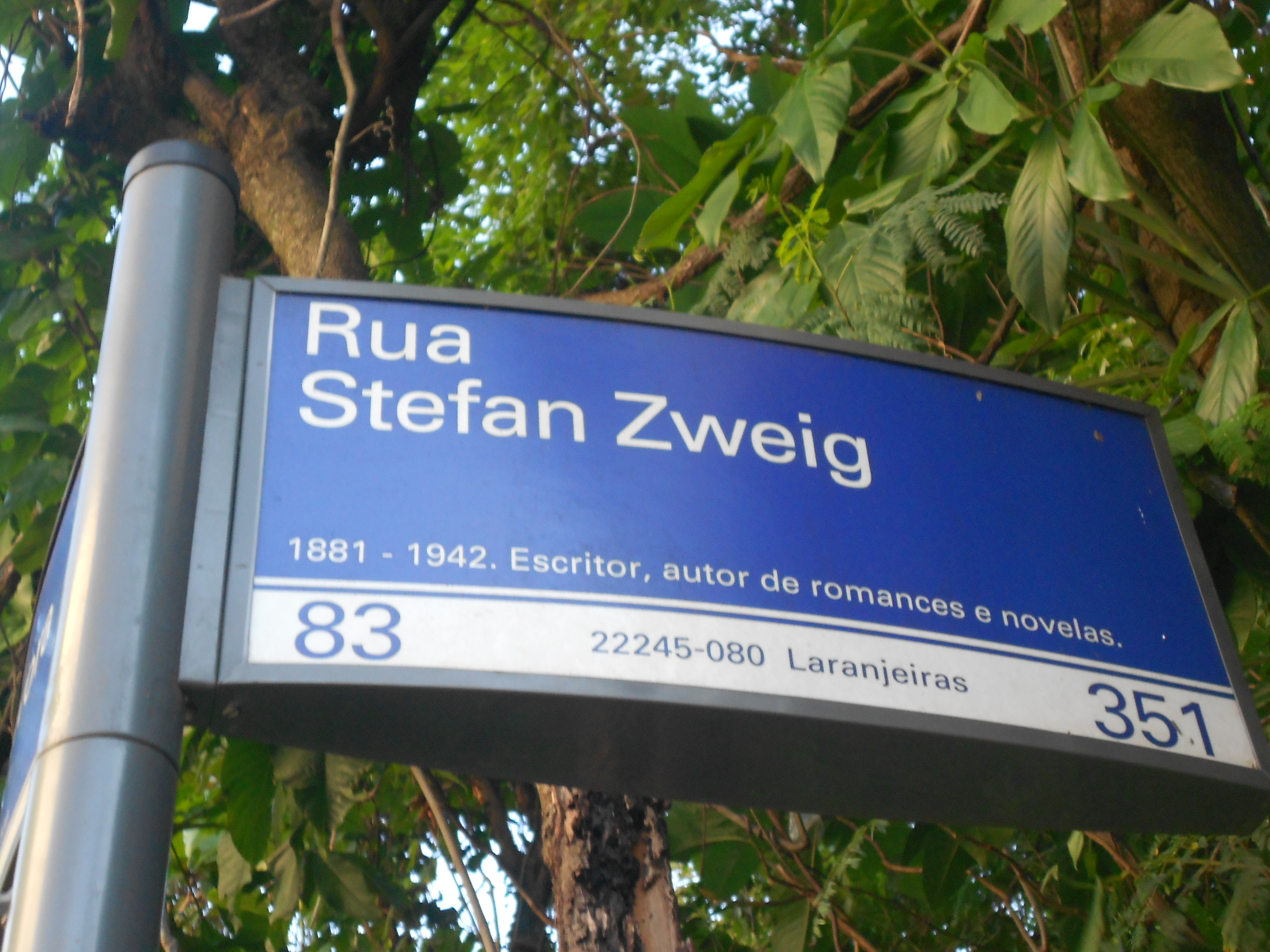
Street named after Zweig in Laranjeiras, Rio de Janeiro

The Zweigs lived only briefly in the US: for two months as guests of Yale University in New Haven, Connecticut, then renting a house in Ossining, New York. On 22 August 1941, they moved again to Petrópolis, 68 kilometres north of Rio de Janeiro. There, he wrote the book Brazil, Land of the Future and developed a close friendship with Chilean poet Gabriela Mistral. Zweig, feeling increasingly depressed about the situation in Europe and the future for humanity, wrote in a letter to author Jules Romains, "My inner crisis consists in that I am not able to identify myself with the me of passport, the self of exile". He had been despairing at the future of Europe and its culture. He wrote: "I think it better to conclude in good time and in erect bearing a life in which intellectual labour meant the purest joy and personal freedom the highest good on Earth". On 23 February 1942, the Zweigs were found dead of a barbiturate overdose in their house in the city of Petrópolis, having taken their own lives. Their bodies were found holding hands.

Barbiturates from Bayer in glass tubes with cork caps - 10 tablets probably produced around 1940

The Zweigs' house in Brazil was later turned into a cultural centre and is now known as Casa Stefan Zweig.

== Work ==
Zweig was a prominent writer in the 1920s and 1930s and a friend of Arthur Schnitzler and Sigmund Freud. He was extremely popular in the United States, South America, and Europe, and remains so in continental Europe, but he was largely ignored in Britain. His fame in America had diminished until the 1990s, when an effort began on the part of several publishers (notably Pushkin Press, Hesperus Press, and The New York Review of Books) to get Zweig back into print in English. Plunkett Lake Press has reissued electronic versions of his non-fiction works. Since that time there has been a marked resurgence, and many of Zweig's books are back in print.

Critical opinion of his oeuvre is strongly divided between those who praise his humanism, simplicity, and effective style, and those who criticize his writing as poor, lightweight, and superficial. In a review entitled "Vermicular Dither", German translator Michael Hofmann scathingly attacked the Austrian's work. Hofmann opined that "Zweig just tastes fake. He's the Pepsi of Austrian writing." Even the author's suicide note, Hofmann suggested, induces "the irritable rise of boredom halfway through it, and the sense that he doesn't mean it, his heart isn't in it (not even in his suicide)".

Zweig is best known for his novellas (notably Schachnovelle (tr. The Royal Game and Chess Story, 1941), Amok (1921), and Letter from an Unknown Woman (Der Brief einer Unbekannten, 1922), which was filmed in 1948 by Max Ophüls), novels (Ungeduld des Herzens 1939, tr. Beware of Pity), Confusion of Feelings, and the posthumously published The Post Office Girl) and biographies (notably of Erasmus of Rotterdam, Ferdinand Magellan, and Mary, Queen of Scots, and also the posthumously published Balzac). He was introduced to American readers in 1919 by a pirated edition of The Burning Secret attributed to "Steven Branch", a literal translation of his name and apparently a concession to lingering anti-German sentiment. His 1932 biography of Queen Marie Antoinette was adapted by Metro-Goldwyn-Mayer as a 1938 film starring Norma Shearer.

Zweig's memoir, The World of Yesterday, was completed in 1942 one day before he died by suicide. It has been widely discussed as a record of "what it meant to be alive between 1881 and 1942" in central Europe; the book has attracted both critical praise and hostile dismissal.

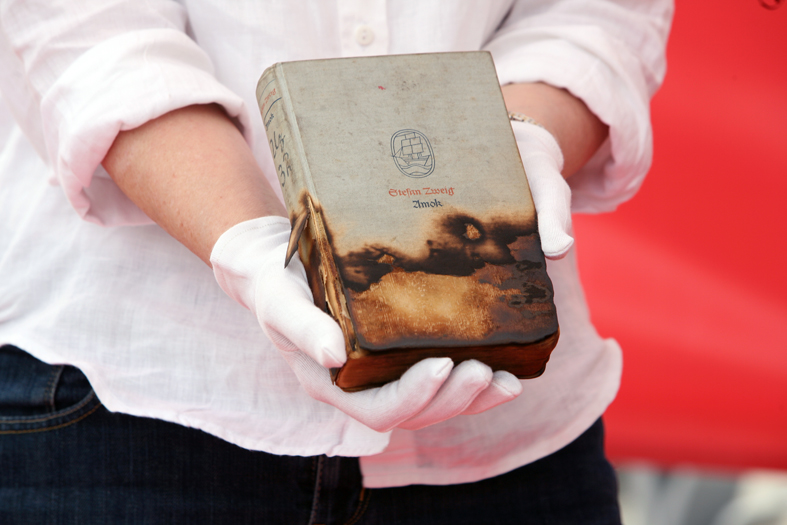
Surviving copy of Zweig's novel Amok (1922) burned by Nazis

Zweig acknowledged his debt to psychoanalysis. In a letter dated 8 September 1926, he wrote to Freud, "Psychology is the great business of my life", adding that Freud had considerable influence on writers such as Marcel Proust, D. H. Lawrence and James Joyce, having given them a lesson in "courage" and helped them to overcome their inhibitions. "Thanks to you, we see many things. – Thanks to you we say many things which otherwise we would not have seen nor said." He claimed autobiography, in particular, had become "more clear-sighted and audacious".

Zweig enjoyed a close association with Richard Strauss and provided the libretto for Die schweigsame Frau (The Silent Woman). Strauss famously defied the Nazi regime by refusing to sanction the removal of Zweig's name from the programme for the work's première on 24 June 1935 in Dresden. As a result, Goebbels refused to attend as planned, and the opera was banned after three performances. Zweig later collaborated with Joseph Gregor to provide Strauss with the libretto for one other opera, Friedenstag, in 1938. At least one other work by Zweig received a musical setting: the pianist and composer Henry Jolles, who like Zweig had fled to Brazil to escape the Nazis, composed a song, "Último poema de Stefan Zweig", based on "Letztes Gedicht", which Zweig wrote on the occasion of his 60th birthday in November 1941. During his stay in Brazil, Zweig wrote Brasilien, Ein Land der Zukunft (Brazil, A Land of the Future) which consisted in a collection of essays on the history and culture of his newly adopted country.

Zweig was a passionate collector of manuscripts. He corresponded at length with Hungarian musicologist Gisela Selden-Goth, often discussing their shared interest in collecting original music scores. There are important Zweig collections at the British Library, at the State University of New York at Fredonia and at the National Library of Israel. The British Library's Stefan Zweig Collection was donated to the library by his heirs in May 1986. It specialises in autograph music manuscripts, including works by Bach, Haydn, Wagner, and Mahler. It has been described as "one of the world's greatest collections of autograph manuscripts". One particularly precious item is Mozart's "Verzeichnüß aller meiner Werke" – that is, the composer's own handwritten thematic catalogue of his works.

The 1993–1994 academic year at the College of Europe was named in his honour.

Zweig has been credited with being one of the novelists who contributed to the emergence of what would later be called the Habsburg myth.

== Bibliography ==
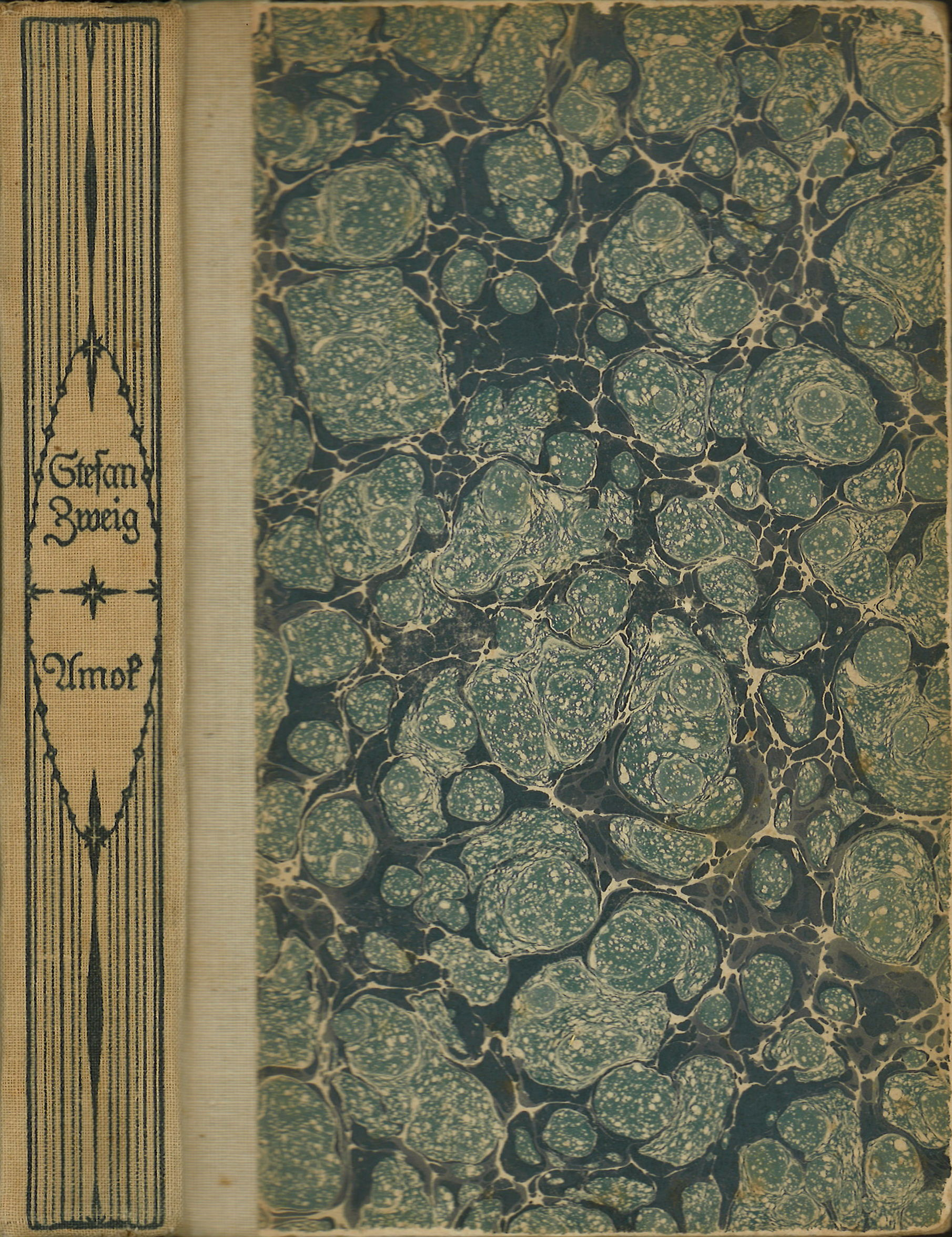
Amok (1922)

The dates mentioned below are the dates of first publication in German.

=== Fiction ===
- Forgotten Dreams, 1900 (Original title: Vergessene Träume)
- Spring in the Prater, 1900 (Original title: Praterfrühling)
- A Loser, 1901 (Original title: Ein Verbummelter)
- In the Snow, 1901 (Original title: Im Schnee)
- Two Lonely Souls, 1901 (Original title: Zwei Einsame)
- The Miracles of Life, 1903 (Original title: Die Wunder des Lebens)
- The Love of Erika Ewald, 1904 (Original title: Die Liebe der Erika Ewald)
- The Star Over the Forest, 1904 (Original title: Der Stern über dem Walde)
- The Fowler Snared, 1906 (Original title: Sommernovellette)
- The Governess, 1907 (Original title: Die Governante)
- Scarlet Fever, 1908 (Original title: Scharlach)
- Twilight, 1910 (Original title: Geschichte eines Unterganges)
- A Story Told in Twilight, 1911, short story (Original title: Geschichte in der Dämmerung)
- Burning Secret, 1913 (Original title: Brennendes Geheimnis)
- Fear, 1920 (Original title: Angst)
- Compulsion, 1920 (Original title: Der Zwang)
- Fantastic Night, 1922 (Original title: Phantastische Nacht)
- Letter from an Unknown Woman, 1922 (Original title: Brief einer Unbekannten)
- Moonbeam Alley, 1922 (Original title: Die Mondscheingasse)
- Amok, 1922 (Original title: Amok) – novella, initially published with several others in Amok. Novellen einer Leidenschaft
- The Invisible Collection, 1925 (Original title: Die unsichtbare Sammlung, first published in book form in 'Insel-Almanach auf das Jahr 1927')
- Downfall of the Heart, 1927 (Original title: Untergang eines Herzens)
- The Refugee, 1927 (Original title: Der Flüchtling. Episode vom Genfer See).
- Confusion of Feelings or Confusion: The Private Papers of Privy Councillor R Von D, 1927 (Original title: Verwirrung der Gefühle) – novella initially published in the volume Verwirrung der Gefühle: Drei Novellen
- Twenty-Four Hours in the Life of a Woman, 1927 (Original title: Vierundzwanzig Stunden aus dem Leben einer Frau) – novella initially published in the volume Verwirrung der Gefühle: Drei Novellen
- Widerstand der Wirklichkeit, 1929 (in English as Journey into the Past (1976))
- Buchmendel, 1929 (Original title: Buchmendel))
- Short stories, 1930 (Original title: Kleine Chronik. Vier Erzählungen) – includes Buchmendel
- Did He Do It?, published between 1935 and 1940 (Original title: War er es?)
- Leporella, 1935 (Original title: Leporella)
- Collected Stories, 1936 (Original title: Gesammelte Erzählungen) – two volumes of short stories:
  1. The Chains (Original title: Die Kette)
  2. Kaleidoscope (Original title: Kaleidoskop). Includes: Casual Knowledge of a Craft, Leporella, Fear, Burning Secret, Summer Novella, The Governess, Buchmendel, The Refugee, The Invisible Collection, Fantastic Night, and Moonbeam Alley. Kaleidoscope: thirteen stories and novelettes, published by The Viking Press in 1934, includes some of those just listed – some with differently translated titles – plus others.
- Incident on Lake Geneva, 1936 (Original title: Episode am Genfer See Revised version of "Der Flüchtung. Episode vom Genfer See", published in 1927)
- The Old-Book Peddler and Other Tales for Bibliophiles, 1937, four pieces (two "clothed in the form of fiction," according to the preface by translator Theodore W. Koch), published by Northwestern University, The Charles Deering Library, Evanston, Illinois:
  1. "Books are the Gateway to the World"
  2. "The Old-Book Peddler; A Viennese Tale for Bibliophiles" (Original title: Buchmendel)
  3. "The Invisible Collection; An Episode from the Post-War Inflation Period" (Original title: Die unsichtbare Sammlung)
  4. "Thanks to Books"
- Beware of Pity, 1939 (Original title: Ungeduld des Herzens) novel
- Legends, a collection of five short stories published in 1945 (Original title: Legenden – published also as Jewish Legends with "Buchmendel" instead of "The Dissimilar Doubles"):
  1. "Rachel Arraigns with God", 1930 (Original title: "Rahel rechtet mit Gott"
  2. "The Eyes of My Brother, Forever", 1922 (Original title: "Die Augen des ewigen Bruders")
  3. "The Buried Candelabrum", 1936 (Original title: "Der begrabene Leuchter")
  4. "The Legend of The Third Dove", 1945 (Original title: "Die Legende der dritten Taube")
  5. "The Dissimilar Doubles", 1927 (Original title: "Kleine Legende von den gleich-ungleichen Schwestern")
- The Royal Game or Chess Story or Chess (Original title: Schachnovelle; Buenos Aires, 1942) – novella written in 1938–41,
- Clarissa, 1981 unfinished novel
- The Debt Paid Late, 1982 (Original title: Die spät bezahlte Schuld)
- The Post Office Girl, 1982 (Original title: Rausch der Verwandlung. Roman aus dem Nachlaß; The Intoxication of Metamorphosis)
- Schneewinter: 50 zeitlose Gedichte, 2016, editor Martin Werhand. Melsbach, Martin Werhand Verlag 2016

=== Biographies and historical texts ===
- Émile Verhaeren (the Belgian poet), 1910
- Three Masters: Balzac, Dickens, Dostoevsky, 1920 (Original title: Drei Meister. Balzac – Dickens – Dostojewski. Translated into English by Eden and Cedar Paul and published in 1930 as Three Masters)
- Romain Rolland: The Man and His Work, 1921 (Original title: Romain Rolland. Der Mann und das Werk)
- Nietzsche, 1925 (Originally published in the volume titled: Der Kampf mit dem Dämon. Hölderlin – Kleist – Nietzsche)
- Decisive Moments in History, 1927 (Original title: Sternstunden der Menschheit). Translated into English and published in 1940 as The Tide of Fortune: Twelve Historical Miniatures; retranslated in 2013 by Anthea Bell as Shooting Stars: Ten Historical Miniatures
- Adepts in Self-Portraiture: Casanova, Stendhal, Tolstoy, 1928 (Original title: Drei Dichter ihres Lebens. Casanova – Stendhal – Tolstoi)
- Joseph Fouché, 1929 (Original title: Joseph Fouché. Bildnis eines politischen Menschen)
- Mental Healers: Franz Mesmer, Mary Baker Eddy, Sigmund Freud, 1932 (Original title: Die Heilung durch den Geist. Mesmer, Mary Baker-Eddy, Freud)
- Marie Antoinette: The Portrait of an Average Woman, 1932 (Original title: Marie Antoinette. Bildnis eines mittleren Charakters) ISBN 4-87187-855-4
- Erasmus of Rotterdam, 1934 (Original title: Triumph und Tragik des Erasmus von Rotterdam)
- Maria Stuart, 1935 (also published as The Queen of Scots or Mary Queen of Scots) ISBN 4-87187-858-9
- A Conscience Against Violence or The Right to Heresy: Castellio against Calvin, 1936 (Original title: Castellio gegen Calvin oder Ein Gewissen gegen die Gewalt)
- Conqueror of the Seas: The Story of Magellan, 1938 (Original title: Magellan. Der Mann und seine Tat) ISBN 4-87187-856-2
- Montaigne (the French philosopher), 1941 ISBN 978-1782271031
- Amerigo, 1942 (Original title: Amerigo. Geschichte eines historischen Irrtums) – written in 1942, published the day before he died ISBN 4-87187-857-0
- Balzac, 1946 – written, as Richard Friedenthal describes in a postscript, in the Brazilian summer capital of Petrópolis, without access to the files, notebooks, lists, tables, editions and monographs that Zweig accumulated for many years and that he took with him to Bath, but that he left behind when he went to America. Friedenthal wrote that Balzac "was to be his magnum opus, and he had been working at it for ten years. It was to be a summing up of his own experience as an author and of what life had taught him." Friedenthal claimed that "The book had been finished", though not every chapter was complete; he used a working copy of the manuscript Zweig left behind him to apply "the finishing touches", and Friedenthal rewrote the final chapters (Balzac, translated by William and Dorothy Rose [New York: Viking, 1946], pp. 399, 402).
- Paul Verlaine (the French poet), Copyright 1913, by L. E. Basset, Boston, Massachusetts. English translation by O. F. Theis. Luce and Company, Boston. Maunsel and Co. Ltd., Dublin and London.

=== Plays ===
- Tersites, 1907
- Das Haus am Meer, 1912
- Jeremiah, 1917
- Ben Jonson's Volpone. A Loveless Comedy in 3 Acts, freely adapted, 1928

=== Other ===
- The World of Yesterday (Original title: Die Welt von Gestern; Stockholm, 1942) – autobiography
- Brazil, Land of the Future (Original title: de:Brasilien. Ein Land der Zukunft; Bermann-Fischer, Stockholm 1941)
- Journeys (Original title: Auf Reisen; Zurich, 1976); collection of essays
- Encounters and Destinies: A Farewell to Europe (2020); collection of essays

=== Letters ===
- Darién J. Davis; Oliver Marshall, eds. (2010). Stefan and Lotte Zweig's South American Letters: New York, Argentina and Brazil, 1940–42. New York: Continuum. ISBN 978-1441107121.
- Henry G. Alsberg, ed. (1954). Stefan and Friderike Zweig: Their Correspondence, 1912–1942. New York: Hastings House. OCLC 581240150.

== Adaptations ==
The 1924 German silent film The House by the Sea (Das Haus am Meer) directed by Fritz Kaufmann was based on Zweig's play of the same name.

Zweig's short story Brennendes Geheimnis was filmed as a 1923 German silent drama directed by Rochus Gliese and again in 1933 as The Burning Secret directed by Robert Siodmak. The 1988 remake of the same film Burning Secret was directed by Andrew Birkin and starred Klaus Maria Brandauer and Faye Dunaway.

Adaptations of Brief einer Unbekannten include an opera and numerous films, among them Max Ophüls' Letter from an Unknown Woman (1948), Salah Abu Seif's Ressalah min emraa maghoula) (1962), and Xu Jinglei's 一个陌生女人的来信 (2004).

Beware of Pity was adapted into a 1946 film with the same title, directed by Maurice Elvey.

An adaptation by Stephen Wyatt of Beware of Pity was broadcast by BBC Radio 4 in 2011.

The 2012 Brazilian film The Invisible Collection, directed by Bernard Attal, is based on Zweig's short story of the same title.

The 2013 French film A Promise (Une promesse) is based on Zweig's novella Journey into the Past (Reise in die Vergangenheit).

The 2013 Swiss film Mary Queen of Scots, directed by Thomas Imbach, is based on Zweig's Maria Stuart.

The end-credits for Wes Anderson's 2014 film The Grand Budapest Hotel say that the film was inspired in part by Zweig's novels. Anderson said that he had "stolen" from Zweig's novels Beware of Pity and The Post Office Girl in writing the film, and it features actors Tom Wilkinson as The Author, a character based loosely on Zweig, and Jude Law as his younger, idealised self seen in flashbacks. In particular, the author's monologue at the beginning of the movie ("It is an extremely common mistake: people think the writer’s imagination is always at work....") is taken from the beginning of Beware of Pity. Anderson also said that the film's protagonist, the concierge Gustave H., played by Ralph Fiennes, was based on Zweig. In the film's opening sequence, a teenage girl visits a shrine for The Author, which includes a bust of him wearing Zweig-like spectacles and celebrated as his country's "National Treasure".

The 2017 Austrian-German-French film Vor der Morgenröte (Stefan Zweig: Farewell to Europe) chronicles Stefan Zweig's travels in North and South America, trying to come to terms with his exile from home.

The 2018 American short film Crepúsculo by Clemy Clarke is based on Zweig's short story "A Story Told in Twilight" and relocated to a quinceañera in 1980s New York.

TV film La Ruelle au clair de lune (1988) by Édouard Molinaro is an adaptation of Zweig's short story Moonbeam Alley.

Schachnovelle, translated as The Royal Game and as Chess Story, was the inspiration for the 1960 Gerd Oswald film Brainwashed, as well as for two Czechoslovak films—the 1980 Královská hra (The Royal Game) and Šach mat (Checkmate), made for television in 1964—and for the 2021 Philipp Stölzl film Chess Story.

== See also ==
- Le Monde's 100 Books of the Century, a list which includes Confusion of Feelings
- List of Austrian writers
