= List of awards and nominations received by Xu Jinglei =

This is a list of awards and nominations received by Chinese actress Xu Jinglei.

== Film ==
=== Beijing College Student Film Festival ===
Year	Award	Category	Nominated work	Result	Ref.
2002	9th	Favorite Actress	Spring Subway	Won	
2007	14th	Favorite Director	Letter from an Unknown Woman	Won	

=== Chinese American Film Festival ===
Year	Award	Category	Nominated work	Result	Ref.
2010	6th	Best Director	Go Lala Go!	Won	

=== China Film Director's Guild Awards ===
Year	Award	Category	Nominated work	Result	Ref.
2011	2nd	Best Young Director	Go Lala Go!	Won	

=== Chinese Film Media Awards ===
Year	Award	Category	Nominated work	Result	Ref.
2002	2nd	Best Actress	Dazzling	Nominated	
2003	3rd	Most Popular Actress	I Love You	Won	
2004	4th	Best Director	My Father and I	Nominated	
2004	4th	Best Actress	My Father and I	Nominated	
2004	4th	Best Screenplay	My Father and I	Won	
2004	4th	Best New Director	My Father and I	Won	
2004	4th	Most Popular Actress (Silver Award)	My Father and I	Won	
2011	11th	Most Anticipated Actress	Go Lala Go!	Nominated	

=== Golden Rooster Awards ===
Year	Award	Category	Nominated work	Result	Ref.
2003	23rd	Best Supporting Actress	Far From Home	Won	
2003	23rd	Best Directorial Debut	My Father and I	Won	

=== Golden Phoenix Awards ===
Year	Award	Category	Nominated work	Result	Ref.
1999	7th	Society Award	Spicy Love Soup	Won	

=== Hong Kong Society of Cinematographers Awards ===
Year	Award	Category	Nominated work	Result	Ref.
2007	19th	Most Charismatic Actress	Confession of Pain	Won	

=== Huabiao Awards ===
Year	Award	Category	Nominated work	Result	Ref.
2003	9th	Outstanding Actress	Far From Home	Nominated	
2003	9th	Outstanding New Actress	I Love You	Won	

=== Hundred Flowers Awards ===
Year	Award	Category	Nominated work	Result	Ref.
2003	26th	Best Actress	Spring Subway	Won	

=== Macau International Movie Festival ===
Year	Award	Category	Nominated work	Result	Ref.
2010	2nd	Best Director	Go Lala Go!	Nominated	

=== San Sebastian International Film Festival ===
Year	Award	Category	Nominated work	Result	Ref.
2004	52nd	Silver Shell for Best Director	Letter from an Unknown Woman	Won	
