= Unknown Woman =

(The) Unknown Woman may refer to:

- The Unknown Woman, a 2006 Italian film
- Unknown Woman (1935 film), an American film
- Unknown Woman (1969 film), an Italian giallo film
- The Unknown Woman (1959 film), an Egyptian film
- Unknown Woman (TV series) (Ireum Eobsneun Yeoja), a 2017 South Korean TV series

== See also ==
- Letter from an Unknown Woman, a 1922 Zweig novella
  - Letter from an Unknown Woman (1948 film)
  - Letter from an Unknown Woman (1962 film)
  - Letter from an Unknown Woman (2004 film)
- Portrait of an Unknown Woman, a 1883 Kramskoi painting
- Portrait of an Unknown Woman (film), a 1954 West German film
- Portrait of an Unknown Woman (novel), a 2022 Daniel Silva novel (not related to the film)
- Fräulein Unbekannt (Miss Unknown), or Anna Anderson, impostor who claimed to be Grand Duchess Anastasia of Russia
