= Manker =

Manker is a surname. Notable people with the surname include:

- Brian Manker, Canadian cellist
- David Manker Abshire (1926–2014), American politician
- Ernst Manker (1893–1972), Swedish ethnographer
- Paulus Manker (born 1958), Austrian film director and actor
- Tina Manker (born 1989), German rower
