= Only Yesterday (1933 film) =

1933 film by John M. Stahl

- Lobby card
- Directed by: John M. Stahl
- Written by: William Hurlbut; George O'Neil; Arthur Richman
- Based on: Letter from an Unknown Woman by Stefan Zweig
- Produced by: Carl Laemmle Jr.
- Starring: Margaret Sullavan; John Boles; Edna May Oliver; Billie Burke
- Cinematography: Merritt B. Gerstad
- Edited by: Milton Carruth
- Music by: Constantin Bakaleinikoff
- Production company: Universal Pictures
- Distributed by: Universal Pictures
- Release date: November 1, 1933
- Running time: 105 minutes
- Country: United States
- Language: English

Only Yesterday is a 1933 American pre-Code melodrama film, directed by John M. Stahl, about a young woman who becomes pregnant by her boyfriend before he rushes off to fight in World War I. It stars Margaret Sullavan (in her film debut) and John Boles.

According to the on-screen credit, the film's story line was "suggested" by the 1931 nonfiction bestseller Only Yesterday by Frederick Lewis Allen, who had sold Universal the rights to his book. The film is set in a time frame close to that of Allen's book but otherwise bears no resemblance to it, and the film's title may simply have been an attempt to capitalize on the book's fame at the time of the film's release. The plot of the film appears to be based closely on Letter from an Unknown Woman (Briefe einer Unbekannten) by Stefan Zweig, published first in 1922 and in English translation a decade later.

According to the New York Times, some moviegoers contacted Zweig's publisher, Viking Press, noting similarities between the film and his book. The Times reported that "These similarities were bought and paid for by Universal Pictures", which moved the story to the United States, "altered the story greatly, and made no mention of Zweig's name in the film". The studio also paid "a large sum" for the right to use the title of Allen's book.

== Cast ==
- Margaret Sullavan as Mary Lane
- John Boles as James Stanton Emerson
- Edna May Oliver as Leona
- Billie Burke as Julia Warren
- Benita Hume as Phyllis Emerson
- Reginald Denny as Bob
- George Meeker as Dave Reynolds
- Jimmy Butler as Jim Jr., Mary's son
- Noel Francis as Letitia
- Bramwell Fletcher as Scott Hughes
- June Clyde as Deborah
- Franklin Pangborn as Tom (uncredited)

Billie Dove and Gloria Stuart were considered for the lead before Margaret Sullavan was cast.

== Plot ==
On October 29, 1929, several New York City society figures are reeling from the stock market crash. Several have assembled at the home of James Stanton Emerson for a cocktail party, remarking on the events in various emotional states. Emerson arrives late for the party, himself bankrupted in the aftermath, and retreats to his office, planning to take his own life. As he writes his goodbye note, he sees a letter waiting for him, and opens it. The letter has been written by Mary Lane, a woman from his past that he has long forgotten.

Reverting to flashback, Mary has a proper introduction to James at a formal party in the last year of World War I, as he is an officer stationed near her. She has contrived an arranged introduction with him, where she proceeds to expound that she has been infatuated with him for two years prior, when she first saw him at another function. They spend the night together and it is implied they have been intimate.

Months later, James and his division are sent to France to fight, and Mary is distraught. She reveals to her mother she is pregnant with his child, and the family arranges for her to spend time in New York with her "broadminded" aunt Julia, where she will give birth out of sight of the family's social circle. When her child, a boy, is born, the Armistice is declared, ending WWI. But when James returns amidst a huge parade, he does not remember her, and is swept up with his more affluent friends. Dejected, Mary decides to raise their son, Jimmy Jr., alone, staying with her aunt. But she keeps aware of all James' comings and goings, including the fact that he has married someone else.

A decade later, Mary has now become a successful shop owner in the manner of her aunt, and Jimmy is now 10 years old and enrolled in military school. During a visit for the Christmas/New Year holiday, Jimmy notices his mother has a suitor, Dave Reynolds, who is clearly fond of her, and offers to pressure him to ask her to marry him, but she tells him not to intervene; in reality, Dave has proposed multiple times, and she has turned him down. The adults go out to a club for the New Year's Eve ball drop, but Mary promises to call her son after midnight to tell him if Dave has proposed and if she has accepted. At the club, she encounters James again, alone in the city while his wife is overseas, who finds her familiar but still does not remember their previous liaison. She agrees to go home with him and engages in cagey repartee with him. She has been sending him anonymous telegrams for years wishing him well. They again spend the night together, but she does not reveal their past history, and she tells him it is better they remain strangers. Returning home, Jimmy is still awake, and she confesses she is not pursuing marriage with Dave; Jimmy, who had been pushing the matter, reveals he wanted it more so that she could have a mate than he wants a father figure, and Mary is relieved.

On October 28, 1929, Mary is on her deathbed, succumbing to heart troubles. She has written a long letter to James to tell him the life she has led since their first night of intimacy and asking him to be a parent to her son in her departure. Jimmy is summoned from his school and sees his mother for the last time. Aunt Julia delivers the letter to James' home.

Returning to James, on finishing reading the letter, he puts away his gun and throws out his suicide note. His wife confronts him about abandoning the party, and he tells her that he had been at the brink but has found something to live for, and acknowledges they have been out of love with each other a long time, giving her his blessing to go with the man she has been seeing on the side. He goes to Julia's apartment.

Upon arriving, Jimmy opens the door to him, in tears over his mother's death. James embraces him, and tries to lift his spirits by asking about his life at school and the medals he has earned. When he senses the child is in the right emotional moment, he reveals he is his father; a direct change from the original Zweig story.

== Reception ==
The film was Universal's only outstanding success released that year according to a poll of movie theater managers.

== Preservation ==
The film and trailer are preserved in the Library of Congress collection.

== See also ==
- Letter from an Unknown Woman, a 1948 film based on Zweig's novel
