= 31st Hundred Flowers Awards =

Chinese film awards ceremony in 2012

The 31st Hundred Flowers Awards was held on held on September 29, 2012 at Shaoxing, Zhejiang.

== Awards and nominations ==
=== Best Film ===
Winning film	Nominees
Aftershock	Love is Not Blind; 1911; Go Lala Go! The Founding of a Party

=== Best Director ===
Winner	Winning film	Nominees
Feng Xiaogang	Aftershock	* Zhang Li for 1911 * Tsui Hark for Flying Swords of Dragon Gate * Huang Jianxin and Han Sanping for The Founding of a Party * Teng Huatao for Love is Not Blind

=== Best Screenplay ===
Winner	Winning film	Nominees
Su Xiaowei	Aftershock	* Wang Xingdong and Chen Baoguang for 1911 * Alex Law for Echoes of the Rainbow * Dong Ling, Ding Ning, Cui Min, Dong Danrui, Chen Siqing, Chen Zhenghong and Hu Hanwen for Yang Shan-zhou * Bao Jingjing for Love is Not Blind

=== Best Actor ===
Winner	Winning film	Nominees
Wen Zhang	Love is Not Blind	* Simon Yam for Echoes of the Rainbow * Chen Kun for Flying Swords of Dragon Gate * Li Xuejian for Yang San-zhou * Winston Chao for 1911

=== Best Actress ===
Winner	Winning film	Nominees
Bai Baihe	Love is Not Blind	* Li Bingbing for 1911 * Sandra Ng for Echoes of the Rainbow * Zhou Xun for Flying Swords of Dragon Gate * Xu Fan for Aftershock

=== Best Supporting Actor ===
Winner	Winning film	Nominees
Sun Chun	1911	* Wao Yaoqing for Love is Not Blind * Li Chen for Aftershock * Aarif Lee for Echoes of the Rainbow; *Zhang Jiayi for The Founding of a Party

=== Best Supporting Actress ===
Winner	Winning film	Nominees
Ning Jing	1911	* Zhu Yuanyuan for Ocean Heaven * Zhang Jingchu for Aftershock * Karen Mok for Go Lala Go! * Gwei Lun-mei for Flying Swords of Dragon Gate

=== Best Newcomer ===
Winner	Winning film	Nominees
Zhang Zifeng	Aftershock	* Li Ai for Go Lala Go! * Li Qin for The Founding of a Party; Zhang Zixuan for Love is Not Blind; Hu Ge for 1911

=== Lifetime Achievement award ===
- Wang Weiyi
- Yan Jizhou

=== Outstanding Film ===
- 1911
- Love is Not Blind
