= Three Romances for Viola, Strings, and Harp =

- by Airat Ichmouratov
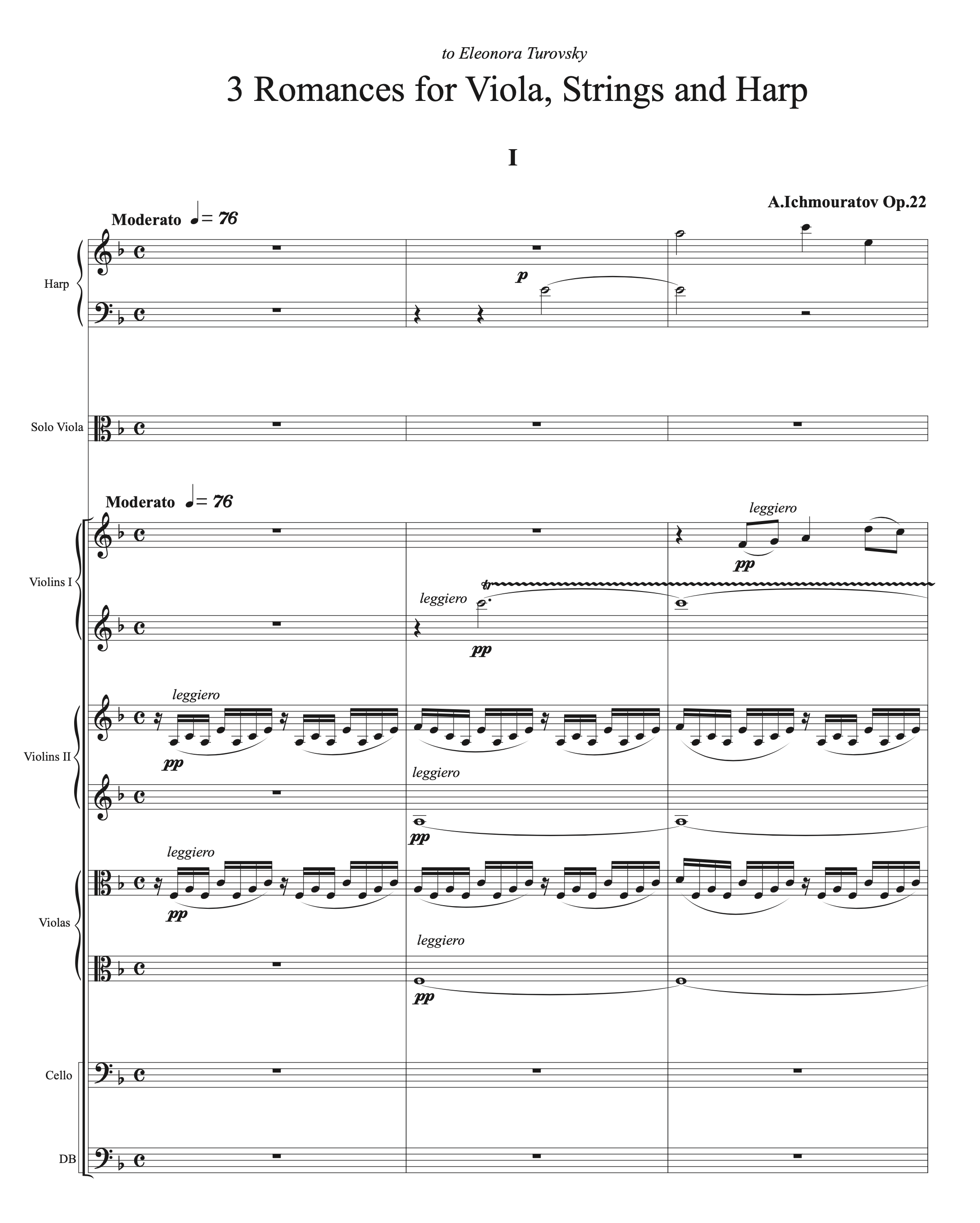
- Three Romances for Viola, Strings, and Harp Op.22 by A.Ichmouratov (first page)
- Opus: 22
- Composed: 2009
- Dedication: Eleonora Turovsky
- Performed: 23 September 2009
- Duration: about 21 minutes
- Movements: 3
- Scoring: Solo Viola, String orchestra, Harp

Airat Ichmouratov's Three Romances for Viola, Strings, and Harp, Op. 22, was composed during the summer of 2009. Ateş Orga stated that Three Romances are an affectionate character portrayal of Eleonora Turovsky (1939–2012) to whom the composition is dedicated and was written as a birthday gift. It was first performed at a surprise birthday concert at University of Montreal on 23 September 2009 by her pupils.

== Dedication ==
Three Romances for Viola, Strings, and Harp are dedicated to Eleonora Turovsky who was a Soviet-born violinist, the concertmaster of I Musici de Montréal, the chamber orchestra founded in 1983 by her husband, renown cellist and conductor Yuli Turovsky.

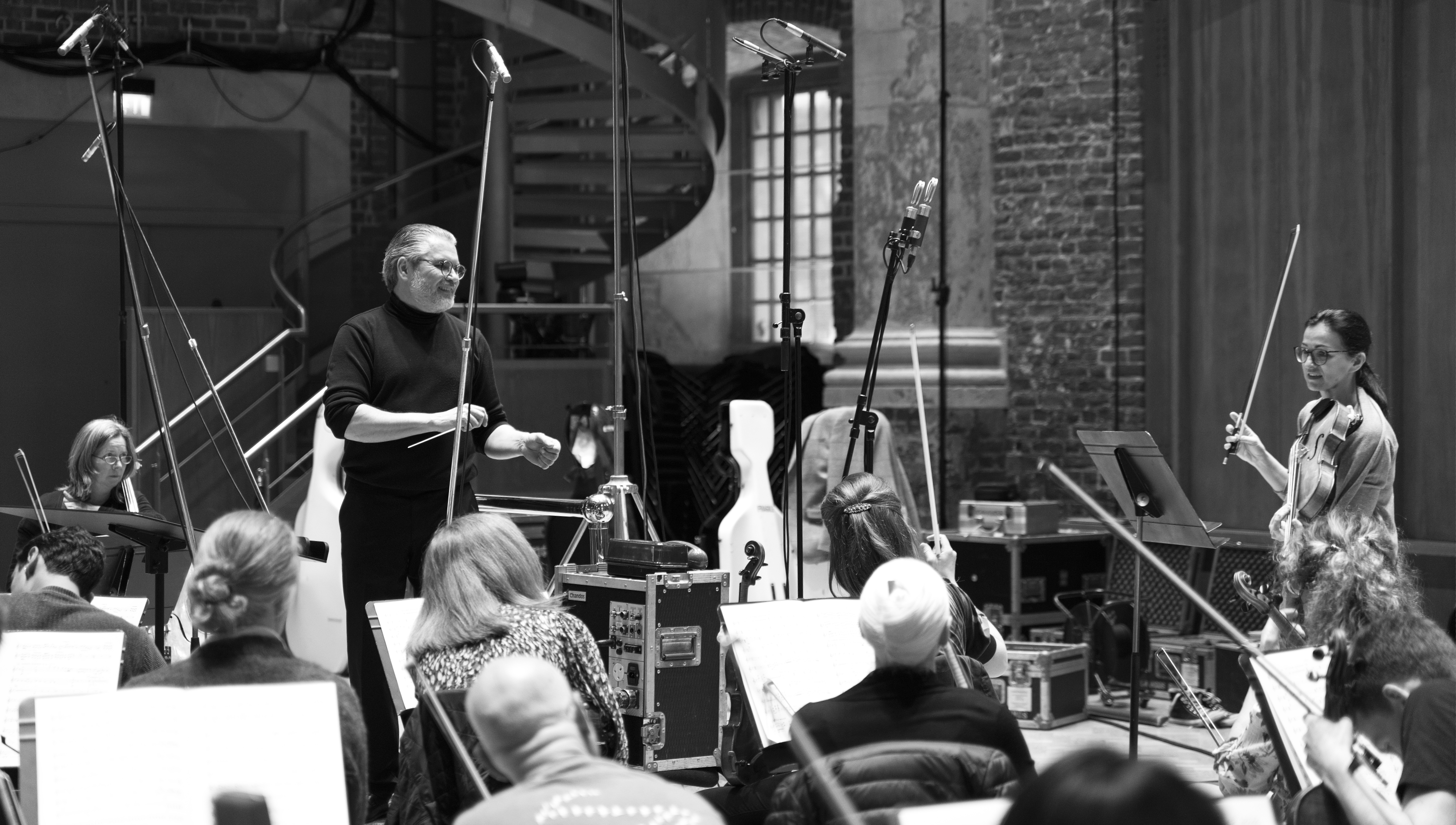
Composer Airat Ichmouratov and violist Elvira Misbakhova in London, May 2022

Airat Ichmouratov collaborated with I Musici de Montréal on multiple occasions. In 2011, replacing Yuli Turovsky on short notice, Ichmouratov conducted the orchestra on tour in USA, Brazil and Peru.

Eleonora Turovsky taught violin and viola at the Université de Montréal from 1991 to 2012. One of her viola students was Elvira Misbakhova, a Canadian violist, today the principal viola of Orchestre Métropolitain, who premiered Three Romances as soloist at University of Montreal. The Romances had their public première 16 May 2012 by Elvira Misbakhova with I Musici de Montréal conducted by the composer.

== Analysis ==
External audio
- Performed by Elvira Misbakhova, I Musici de Montreal Chamber orchestra, Airat Ichmouratov, conductor
- I. Moderato – Andante – Adagio
- II. Adagio
- III. Largo

The work comprises three separate movements:

1. Moderato – Andante – Adagio
2. Adagio
3. Largo

A typical performance of the work lasts around 21 minutes

In the first Romance, a graceful and sustained theme evokes the sensation of a spring awakening, mirroring the ebb and flow of a gentle breeze. In the subsequent variation, harp accompaniment enhances the richness of the string texture, while the viola line gradually comes to life. The Second Romance is a slow-moving ostinato. Its main theme rises and as the layers build, a new, more rhythmic theme is introduced. The music becomes more emphatic. After tutti culmination the tension is resolved during a brief recitative and the viola leads into a concluding variation over the opening ostinato sequence.

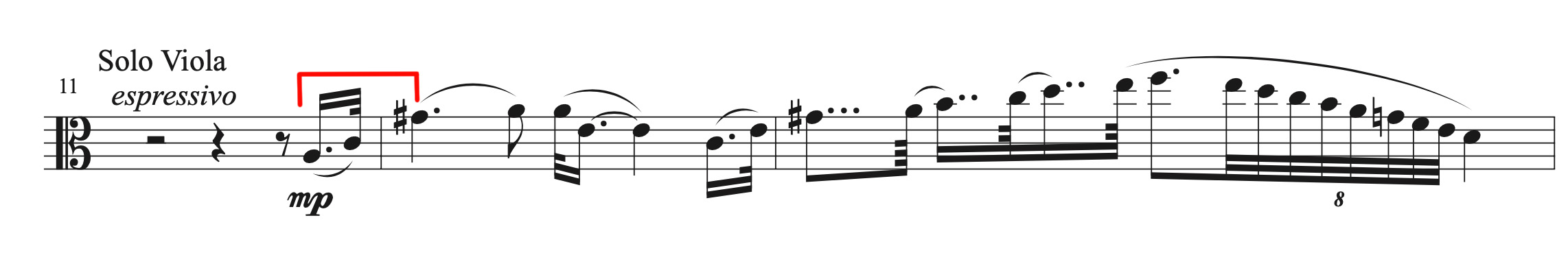
A.Ichmouratov, Three Viola Romances Op.22, III mv. mm 11-13. Example of 'Fate' motif 'Fate' motif Example of 'Fate' motif in Three Viola Romances III mv. mm 11-13.

The third Romance was written under the influence of Mahler and Shostakovich. We could see it partly through the atmosphere reminiscent of Mahler's Fifth Symphony's Adagietto and also through the incorporation of expressive long suspensions within the opening motif of the primary theme. According to Keith Horner the notable leap of a seventh in this motif is inspired by one of the themes found in the final movement of Shostakovich's Fourth Symphony. He mentions that Ichmouratov acknowledges this motif as his personal 'Fate' motif, which could be found in such works as his String Octet "Letter from an Unknown Woman", the String Quartet N4 Op.35, Second Cello Concerto, Flute Concerto and Second Concerto Grosso.

== Recording ==
- Chandos Records: CHAN 20141 – Ichmouratov: Orchestral Works; Belarusian State Chamber Orchestra, Elvira Misbakhova viola, Evgeny Bushkov conductor

== Critical reception ==
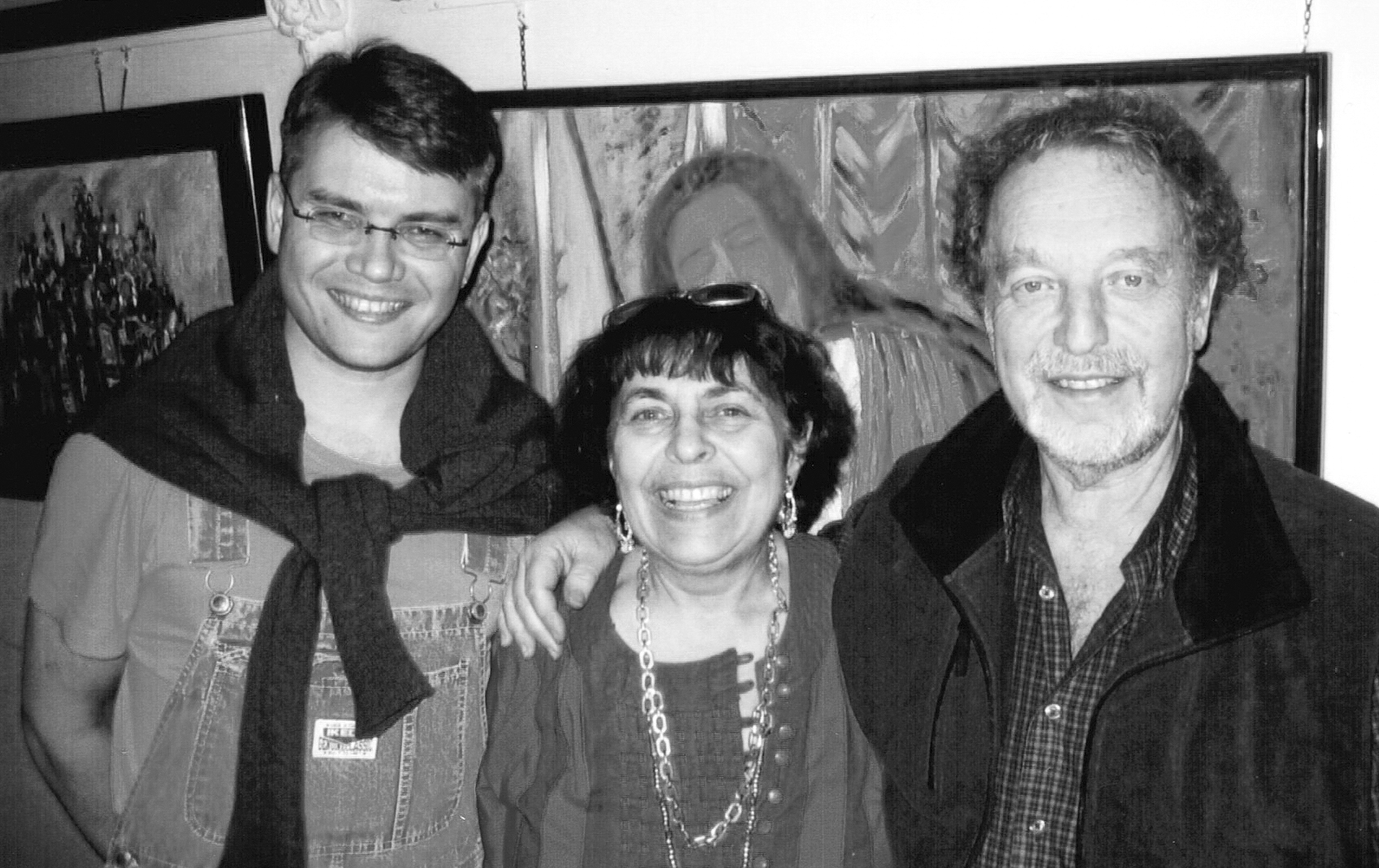
Composer Airat Ichmouratov with violinist Eleonora Turovsky (to whom Three Romances for Viola, Strings, and Harp Op.22 are dedicated) and her husband, Canadian cellist and conductor Yuli Turovsky, summer 2001

The recording of Three Romances for Viola gained average-to-positive reviews. Carlos Maria Solare of The Strad wrote: "Three Romances for viola, strings and harp creates a rustling accompaniment for the soloist to unfold its carefree song over". Ateş Orga of ClassicalSource.com wrote: "The Three Romances for viola and strings with harp obbligato – a musical portrait of the violinist Eleonora Turovsky – ravish at every turn". David Guttman of Gramophone wrote: "The Three Romances for viola and orchestra, Op 22, mine a more wistful seam".
