= Letter from an Unknown Woman (2004 film) =

- Film poster
- Traditional Chinese: 一個陌生女人的來信
- Simplified Chinese: 一个陌生女人的来信
- Hanyu Pinyin: Yīgè mòshēng nǚrén de láixìn
- Directed by: Xu Jinglei
- Screenplay by: Xu Jinglei
- Based on: Letter from an Unknown Woman by Stefan Zweig
- Produced by: Dong Ping; Xu Jinglei; Zhao Yijun; Ma Paobing
- Starring: Xu Jinglei; Jiang Wen
- Cinematography: Mark Lee Ping-bing
- Edited by: Zhang Yifan
- Music by: Osamu Kubota; Lin Hai
- Distributed by: Asian Union Film & Media
- Release dates: September 20, 2004 (San Sebastián); March 4, 2005 (China)
- Running time: 90 minutes
- Country: China
- Language: Mandarin

Letter from an Unknown Woman is a 2004 Chinese drama film written and directed by Xu Jinglei and is her second feature film as director after 2002's My Father and I. The film is an adaptation of Stefan Zweig's 1922 novella of the same name, which was also adapted in 1948 by screenwriter Howard Koch. The film stars Xu and Jiang Wen as lovers during the 1930s and 1940s in Beijing. It was produced by Asian Union Film & Media.

Xu Jinglei won the Best Director award for the film at the 2004 San Sebastián International Film Festival.

== Plot ==
In the winter of 1948 in Beijing, a renowned writer (Jiang Wen) receives a letter from an unknown woman on his birthday. As he reads the letter, a female voiceover begins to recount a relationship he has forgotten. The woman, a Miss Jiang, tells of her first infatuation with the writer when she was in her early teens, when she was his neighbour at a siheyuan. When Miss Jiang moves back to Beijing years later as a student at the Peking Women's College, she has a brief liaison with him, after which she becomes pregnant. Days later, the writer forgets her, failing to make the connection that she was his childhood neighbour.

She gives birth to their son in Sichuan, during the war-torn years of the Second Sino-Japanese War. When she moves back after the war to Beijing, she becomes a dance hostess to support her son. Although the two have another chance encounter, the writer again does not recognize her after so many years. They have one last liaison again. Though finding her familiar, the writer fails to pin down her identity. On the day after their son dies in an illness, she decides to write this letter to be posted after her death, to let him know of their existence.

== Cast ==
- Xu Jinglei as Miss Jiang. The director and successful actress took on the role of the title character who, as a young girl, becomes infatuated with the writer played by Jiang Wen. Her character then engages in a short but torrid love affair with the writer in the midst of the Second Sino-Japanese War.
- Jiang Wen as the writer. A wealthy and successful writer who captures of the imagination of Miss Jiang as a girl and later becomes her lover. Jiang, a successful actor and director himself, and also starred in Xu Jinglei's debut film, My Father and I.
- Lin Yuan as Miss Jiang as a young girl.
- Sun Feihu as the writer's house steward. Years later, only the steward recognizes Miss Jiang in her new role as a high-society courtesan.
- Su Xiaoming as Miss Jiang's mother.
- Huang Jue as an army officer and Miss Jiang's new companion when she returns to Beijing after the war.

== Production ==
Originally the film's story was to have taken place in more recent times, spanning the 1970s through the 1990s. However, Xu moved the film's setting several decades back in time, to avoid dealing with social issues such as unmarried mothers and prostitution during the Cultural Revolution that ended in the 1970s, to avoid arousing the suspicions of Chinese censors.

Xu also decided to use Beijing as the primary setting over cities like Shanghai (which she felt was overly colonial), Chongqing, and Nanjing (both of which were too turbulent during the war to adequately serve as the setting for a love story). Additionally, Xu felt that Beijing would offer a distinct visual perspective that would have been absent in other Chinese cities.
