= Three Romances =

Three Romances may refer to:

- Three Welsh Romances (medieval tales)
- Three Romances for Oboe and Piano (Schumann)
- Three Romances for Violin and Piano (Clara Schumann)
- Three Romances for Viola, Strings, and Harp (Ichmouratov)
