= Li Ai =

Chinese television personality, singer, actress and model

- Born: 李艾; 4 January 1979 (age 47); Guangzhou, Guangdong, China
- Modeling information
- Height: 1.78 m (5 ft 10 in)
- Hair color: Black
- Eye color: Black
- Agency: Star Point Model Agency

Li Ai
- Chinese: 李艾
- Hanyu Pinyin: Lǐ Ài
Transcriptions
Standard Mandarin
- Hanyu Pinyin: Lǐ Ài
- Bopomofo: ㄌㄧˇ ㄞˋ
- Gwoyeu Romatzyh: Lii Ay
- Wade–Giles: Lih^{3} Ai^{4}
- IPA: [lì âɪ]
Hakka
- Romanization: Lí Ngie
Yue: Cantonese
- Yale Romanization: Léih Ngaaih
- Jyutping: Lei^{5} Ngaai^{6}
Southern Min
- Hokkien POJ: Lí Ngāi
- Tâi-lô: Lí Ngāi

Li Ai (Chinese: 李艾; pinyin: Lǐ Ài; born 4 January 1979 in Guangzhou, Guangdong), is a Chinese television personality, singer, actress and model.

In 1999, Li Ai represented her country of China in the Ford Models Supermodel of the World. Upon her return home, she focused on her studies while taking on national modeling jobs.

Li Ai released her first single called "我喜欢我自己这样" ("I like myself this way") in 2002, which scored her several music awards, including the global Chinese Media Pop Award and Oriental Billboard Award. She went on to become the host of the Chinese edition of America's Next Top Model called China's Next Top Model, as well as being a television correspondent for the 2008 Summer Olympics and the 2010 Asian Games.

== Filmography ==
- Go Lala Go! (2010)
- Single No More (2011)
- Dear Enemy (2011)
- Breakfast (2012)
- A Chilling Cosplay (2013)
- China Salesman (2017)
