= Your Side =

- Your Side cover

Studio album by Stanley Huang
- Released: 1 March 2000
- Genre: Mandopop, pop, R&B, dance, hip hop
- Length: 38:53
- Language: Mandarin, Taiwanese
- Label: EMI Music Taiwan

Stanley Huang chronology
Your Side (2000)	Circus Monkey (2001)

Your Side (Chinese: 妳身邊) is Taiwanese Mandopop artist Stanley Huang's debut Mandarin solo studio album. It was released on 1 March 2000 by EMI Music Taiwan.

== Track listing ==
1. 睡 (Shui) – 2:31
2. 妳身邊 (Ni Shen Bian) – Your Side – 4:52
3. 冷水澡 (Leng Shui Zao) – Cold Shower – 3:53
4. 狀元 (Zhuang Yuan) – 3:52
5. 青春真残酷 (Qing Chun Zhen Can Ku) – 4:26
6. Leave Me Alone – 4:01
7. 妳 (Ni) – You – 4:10
8. 放風聲 (Fang Feng Sheng) – 3:46
9. 愛人未遂 (Ai Ren Wei Sui) – 3:23
10. 相约不如偶遇 (Xiang Yue Bu Ru Ou Yu) – 3:59
