= Beijing Galloping Horse Group =

Chinese film and television production company

Beijing Galloping Horse Group (Chinese: 北京小馬奔騰集團) is a Chinese film and television production company that invests in film and television production, acting agent, advertisement, magazine and other fields of operation.

== Productions ==
Including co-productions

=== Film ===
- Mulan (2009)
- Just Another Pandora's Box (2010)
- Reign of Assassins (2010)
- Eternal Moment (2011)
- The Crossing (2014)
- Fleet of Time (2014)

=== Television ===
- Sigh of His Highness (2006)
- Three Kingdoms (2010)

== See also ==
- Digital Domain
