= Shades of My Mind =

- Shades of My Mind cover

Studio album by Stanley Huang
- Released: 29 October 2004
- Recorded: 2003–2004
- Genre: Mandopop, pop, R&B, dance, hip hop
- Language: Mandarin, Taiwanese
- Label: EMI Music Taiwan

Stanley Huang chronology
Sound Wave (2003)	Shades of My Mind (2004)	Atheist Like Me (2007)

Shades of My Mind (Chinese: 黑的意念) is Taiwanese Mandopop artist Stanley Huang's (Chinese: 黃立行) 4th Mandarin studio album. It was released on 29 October 2004 by EMI Music Taiwan.

== Track listing ==
1. 浴缸 (Yu Gang) - Drowned
2. 我是你的誰 (Wo Shi Ni De Shei) - Who's Your Daddy
3. 鴕鳥式沉默 (Tuo Wu Shi Chen Mo) - Suppression
4. 黑的意念 (Hei De Yi Nian) - Shades of My Mind
5. 複製人軍隊 (Fu Zhi Ren Jun Dui) - Army Of Clones
6. 感染 (Gan Ran) - Contagious
7. 樓梯間 (Lou Ti Jian) - Rendezvous
8. 忙與盲 (Mang Yu Mang) - Busy And Blind
9. 世界只有我們 (Shi Jie Zhi You Wo Men) - Only U
10. 緣投與阿醜2004 (Yuan Tou Yu A Chou 2004) - Handsome and Ugly 2004
