= The Missing (2017 film) =

- Poster
- Chinese: 绑架者
- Directed by: Xu Jinglei; Yang Yishu
- Screenplay by: Xu Jinglei; Yang Yishu
- Produced by: Xu Jinglei; Gao Ke; Bing Meng
- Starring: Bai Baihe; Stanley Huang; Ming Dao; Xu Jinglei
- Release date: 31 March 2017 (China)
- Running time: 95 minutes
- Country: China
- Language: Mandarin
- Box office: CN¥92 million

The Missing (Chinese: 绑架者) is a 2017 Chinese action crime film directed and written by Xu Jinglei and Yang Yishu, starring Bai Baihe, Stanley Huang, Ming Dao and Xu Jinglei. It was released in China on 31 March 2017.

== Plot ==
The story occurs in the year 2015 in the fictional city of Xuanyu. In the wake of a series of disappearances of children, a police officer named Lin, whose daughter was among the victims, receives a phone call at night from a random man driving a car, who claims to know her daughter's location. However, a truck collides with the man's car, injuring him and resulting in amnesia. According to the man's identity-card, his name is Yang, but the card is noted by the police to be fake. At the hospital, an assassin approaches Yang's room, murdering the police guards, and attempts to murder Yang, but Yang kills him in self-defense. A police officer named Lu attempts to apprehend Yang, but Yang flees the scene and steals enough money from pedestrians to pay for food, clothes, and a hotel room. He proceeds to infiltrate the police station where his belongings were confiscated.

Lin realizes that Yang has amnesia, and investigates by herself, despite orders to recuse herself from the case, since she is the mother of one of the victims. She reasons that Yang's priority would be to rediscover his identity by retracing his steps. Noting that among Yang's belongings was a lighter from a KTV club, she follows Yang to the KTV club, where the latter learns that he had a partnership of some kind with Mr Lei. At this point, Yang fights with several assassins before Lin discovers and arrests him. Instead of bringing Yang to the station, however, Lin attempts to interrogate Yang privately, but Yang seizes her gun and escapes again. Yang discovers that Mr Lei is a casino owner, and goes to meet him. It is revealed that Mr Lei is a mob boss who is furious at Yang for somehow double-crossing him. As the mobsters chase Yang, seeking to kill him, Lin appears and rescues him.

After one more assassination attempt, occurring at a hotel, Yang and Lin head to a private yacht owned by Mr Lei, hoping to find Lin's daughter. However, they are assaulted by numerous armed mobsters. They resist for a time, and are rescued by a SWAT team, but Yang absconds once more. Meanwhile, Mr Lei is killed by a car-bomb. This time around, by tracking the finger-print of the dead assassin from the hospital, they arrive at an MMA club. Yang eventually regains his memory, realizing that he is an undercover agent from the central government, that the child disappearances were part of an organ harvesting ring conducted by Mr Lei, and that Lu was working with Mr Lei in exchange for an organ transplant for a relative. Lu murdered Mr Lei using the car-bomb in order to protect his own reputation. In the final scene, Lu attempts to murder Lin, but is shot by Yang and dies.

== Cast ==
- Bai Baihe as Lin Wei
- Stanley Huang as Yang Nian
- Ming Dao as Lu Ran
- Xu Jinglei as the mysterious woman
- Mason Lee as Xiao K
- Nicky Lee as Zhao Daqi
- Tao Hai as Zhou Tao
- Stephanie Chang as Ni Na
- Liang Tian as Brother Lei
- Sunny Sun
- Chu Jun-chen

== Reception ==
The film has grossed CN¥92 million in China.
