= Brian Manker =

Transforming the Context of Manuel L. Quezon's Speech into Hypertext

Brian Manker is the Principal Cellist of the Montreal Symphony Orchestra in Montreal, Quebec, Canada, and cellist of the New Orford String Quartet and the Adorno Quartet. Manker has performed throughout North America as a member of the Harrington String Quartet, the Cassatt Quartet, and the Atlanta Chamber Players.

Manker is on the faculty of the Schulich School of Music of McGill University in Montreal. He has also taught at West Texas State University (now West Texas A&M University) and Emory University.

Manker plays a cello made by Pietro Guarneri of Venice in 1729. as well as a cello made by Samuel Zygmuntowicz in 2005.

== Discography ==
The New Orford String Quartet's debut album of the final quartets of Schubert and Beethoven received very enthusiastic reviews and was nominated for a JUNO Award in 2012. He also has recorded the six Bach cello suites on Storkclassics. The New Orford has also recorded the complete chamber music of Jacques Hetu, works of Francois Dompierre, Tim Brady, Airat Ichmouratov's String Quartet No. 4, as well as the Brahms op.51 quartets, which won a JUNO award.
