= We All Lay Down in the End =

We All Lay Down In The End
- We All Lay Down In The End cover

Studio album by Stanley Huang
- Released: 5 December 2008
- Recorded: 2007–2008
- Genre: Mandopop, pop, R&B, dance, hip hop
- Length: 36:37
- Language: Mandarin
- Label: Warner Music Taiwan

Stanley Huang chronology
Atheist Like Me (2007)	We All Lay Down In The End (2008)

Alternative cover
- We All Lay Down In The End (AERO Version) cover

We All Lay Down In The End (Chinese: 最後只好躺下來) is Taiwanese Mandopop artist Stanley Huang's (Chinese: 黃立行) 6th Mandarin studio album. It was released on 5 December 2008 by Warner Music Taiwan (華納唱片).

Like previous albums, one more edition was released, We All Lay Down In The End (AERO Version)(最後只好躺下來 (AERO旗艦版)), on 10 January 2009, including a bonus DVD containing three behind-the-scene footages with music videos.

== Track listing ==
1. 吃我 (Chi Wo) - Eat Me, Drink Me - 3:24
2. 黑夜盡頭 (Hei Ye Jin Tou) - Night's Almost Over - 3:40
3. 明天見 (Ming Tian Jian) - See You Tomorrow - 3:26
4. 黑寡婦 (Hei Gua Fu) - Kiss of the Black Widow - 3:13
5. 最後只好躺下來 (Zui Hou Zhi Hao Tang Xia Lai) - We All Lay Down In the End - 4:52
6. 望塵莫及 (Wang Chen Mo Ji) - Hey You - 3:15
7. 巴別塔 (Ba Bie Ta) - Tower of Babel - 3:59
8. 侵略地球 (Qin Lue Di Qiu) - My Earth - 3:50
9. 狂信者 (Kuang Xin Zhe) - Adulation - 3:43
10. 十八啊 (Shi Ba A) - Ah Eighteen - 3:15

=== Bonus DVD ===
We All Lay Down In The End (AERO Version) - Behind The Scenes + MV

1. "最後只好躺下來" (We All Lay Down In the End)
2. "黑夜盡頭" (Night's Almost Over)
3. "巴別塔" (Tower of Babel)
