= Invaders of Earth =

1952 anthology edited by Groff Conklin

- Cover of first edition
- Editor: Groff Conklin
- Language: English
- Genre: Science fiction
- Publisher: Vanguard Press
- Publication date: 1952
- Publication place: United States
- Media type: Print (hardcover)
- Pages: xiv, 333

Invaders of Earth is an anthology of science fiction short stories edited by the American anthologist Groff Conklin. It was first published in hardcover by Vanguard Press in 1952. An abridged paperback edition including only 15 of the 22 stories was published by Pocket Books in July 1955. Another paperback edition, containing 17 of the original 22 stories was published by Tempo Books in September 1962 and reprinted in September 1964. The first British edition was published under the variant title Invaders of Earth - More Tales of Space and Time in hardcover by Weidenfeld & Nicolson in 1953 and reprinted in 1955. A two-volume British paperback edition, also abridged, was published by Digit in 1962, the first volume under the original title and the second under the title Enemies in Space; together, they included 14 of the original 22 stories.

The book collects 22 novelettes and short stories by various science fiction authors, together with an introduction, prologue, section introductions and epilogue by the editor. The stories were previously published from 1907 to 1952 in science fiction and other magazines.

== Contents ==
Note: stories also appearing in one of the abridged editions annotated IP (Invaders of Earth (Pocket Books edition), ID (Invaders of Earth (Digit edition), or ES (Enemies in Space (Digital Edition).

- "Introduction" (Groff Conklin) IP
- "Prologue: The Distant Past" (Groff Conklin) IP
  - "This Star Shall Be Free" (Murray Leinster) IP ID
- "Part One: The Immediate Past: It Could Have Happened Already" (Groff Conklin) IP
  - "Castaway" (Robert Moore Williams) ID
  - "Impulse" (Eric Frank Russell) IP ID
  - "Top Secret" (David Grinnell) IP
  - "An Eel by the Tail" (Allen K. Lang) ID
  - "A Date to Remember" (William F. Temple) IP
  - "Storm Warning" (Millard Verne Gordon) IP ID
  - "Child of Void" (Margaret St. Clair) ID
  - "Tiny and the Monster" (Theodore Sturgeon) IP
  - "The Discord Makers" (Mack Reynolds) IP
  - "Pen Pal" (Milton Lesser) IP
  - "Not Only Dead Men" (A. E. van Vogt) ID
- "Part Two: The Immediate Future: It May Happen Yet" (Groff Conklin) IP
  - "Enemies in Space" (translation of "Feinde im Weltall") (Karl Grunert) ES
  - "Invasion from Mars" (Howard Koch) IP ES
  - "Minister Without Portfolio" (Mildred Clingerman) IP
  - "The Waveries" (Fredric Brown) ES
  - "Crisis" (Edward Grendon) IP
  - "Angel's Egg" (Edgar Pangborn) IP ES
  - "Will You Walk a Little Faster?" (William Tenn) IP
  - "The Man in the Moon" (Henry A. Norton) ID
  - "Pictures Don't Lie" (Katherine MacLean) IP ES
- "Epilogue: The Distant Future" (Groff Conklin) IP
  - "The Greatest Tertian" (Anthony Boucher) IP ES
