= Stan Up =

- Stan Up cover

Studio album by Stanley Huang
- Released: 16 November 2002
- Recorded: 2001–2002
- Genre: Mandopop, pop, R&B, dance, hip hop
- Length: 44:57
- Language: Mandarin
- Label: EMI Music Taiwan

Stanley Huang chronology
Circus Monkey (2001)	Stan Up (2002)	Sound Wave (2003)

Alternative cover
- Stan Up/Make Free 2003 (Deluxe Limitation Edition) cover

Stan Up is Taiwanese Mandopop artist Stanley Huang's (Chinese: 黃立行) 3rd Mandarin studio album. It was released on 16 November 2002 by EMI Music Taiwan. One further edition was released, Stan Up/Make Free 2003 (Deluxe Limitation Edition) (Stan Up/解禁2003(激突CD+VCD超值限量紀念版)) on 2 January 2003 with a bonus DVD containing seven music videos and also an exclusive calendar of "2003 Stanley".
