= Circus Monkey =

- Circus Monkey cover

Studio album by Stanley Huang
- Released: 12 January 2001
- Recorded: 2000–2001
- Genre: Mandopop, pop, R&B, dance, hip hop
- Length: 41:22
- Language: Mandarin, Taiwanese
- Label: EMI Music Taiwan

Stanley Huang chronology
Your Side (2000)	Circus Monkey (2001)	Stan Up (2002)

Circus Monkey (Chinese: 馬戲團猴子) is Taiwanese Mandopop artist Stanley Huang's (Chinese: 黃立行) 2nd Mandarin studio album. It was released on 12 January 2001 by EMI Music Taiwan.

== Track listing ==
1. Help - 4:26
2. 馬戲團猴子 (Ma Shi Tuan Hou Zi) - Circus Monkey - 4:03
3. 心內有鬼 (Xin Nei You Gui) - Show Me Your Demons - 4:32
4. 你裝酷，我想吐 (Ni Zhuang Ku, Wo Xiang Tu) - 3:07
5. 一半的靈魂 (Yi Ban De Ling Hun) - 4:35
6. 休假 (Xiu Jia) - 3:26
7. High的後遺症 (High De Hou Yi Zheng) - Effects of the High - 3:52
8. 絕對無罪 (Jue Dui Wu Zui) - 4:32
9. 我的樣子 (Wo De Yang Zi) - 3:49
10. 不斷跳舞 (Bu Duan Tiao Wu) - 5:00
