= Sound Wave (album) =

- Sound Wave cover

Compilation album by Stanley Huang
- Released: 28 November 2003
- Genre: Mandopop, pop, R&B, dance, hip hop
- Language: Mandarin, Taiwanese
- Label: EMI Music Taiwan

Stanley Huang chronology
Stan Up (2002)	Sound Wave (2003)	Shades of my Mind (2004)

Sound Wave (Chinese: 音浪) is Taiwanese Mandopop artist Stanley Huang's (Chinese: 黃立行) first compilation album. It was released between Your Side (妳身邊) and Stan Up. This album has including four new songs and 16 previously released tracks. It was issued on 23 November 2003.

A DVD Karaoke Version Sound Wave (New Song + Collection) (音浪 新歌+精選) was released on 6 January 2004 which featuring fourteen music videos (3 new songs and 11 previous tracks).

== Track listing ==
New tracks are in bold

=== Disc 1 ===
1. **預言 (Yu Yan)**
2. 馬戲團猴子 (Ma Shi Tuan Hou Zi) - Circus Monkey
3. 狀元 (Zhuang Yuan)
4. 不斷跳舞 (Bu Duan Tiao Wu)
5. 流浪狗 (Liu Lang Gou) - Doggie Style
6. **少林傳奇 (Shao Lin Chuan Qi)**
7. 八卦 (Ba Qua) - Gossip King
8. Machi
9. 我的夢中情人 (Wo De Meng Zhong Qing Ren) - My Dream Girl
10. 心內有鬼 (Xin Nei You Gui) - Show Me Your Demons

=== Disc 2 ===
1. **音浪 (Yin Lang) - Sound Wave**
2. Let It Go feat. Elva Hsiao
3. **分開旅行 (Feng Kai Lu Xing) feat. Rene Liu**
4. 你身邊 (Ni Shen Bian) - Your Side
5. Leave Me Alone
6. 冷水澡 (Leng Shui Zao)
7. Help
8. 迷航記 (Mi Hang Ji) - Lost At Sea
9. 尋找 (Xun Zhao) - Looking For You
10. 睡 (Shui)

=== DVD Karaoke ===
1. **預言**
2. 馬戲團猴子 - Circus Monkey
3. 狀元
4. 不斷跳舞
5. 流浪狗 - Doggie Style
6. 八卦 - Gossip King
7. 我的夢中情人 - My Dream Girl
8. 心內有鬼 - Show Me Your Demons
9. **音浪 - Sound Wave**
10. Let It Go feat. Elva Hsiao
11. **分開旅行 feat. Rene Liu**
12. 你身邊 - Your Side
13. Leave Me Alone
14. 冷水澡
