= Eternal Moment =

- Film poster
- Traditional Chinese: 將愛情进行到底
- Simplified Chinese: 将爱情进行到底
- Hanyu Pinyin: Jiāng ài qing jin xing dao di
- Directed by: Zhang Yibai
- Written by: Xing Aina; Shen Wei; Zhang Yibai
- Produced by: Zhang Yibai
- Starring: Xu Jinglei; Li Yapeng; Chapman To
- Cinematography: Huang Lian
- Edited by: Kong Jinlei
- Production companies: Beijing Galloping Horse Film & TV Production; Beijing Century Spring Media; Le Grand Films
- Release date: February 14, 2011 (China)
- Running time: 105 minutes
- Country: China
- Language: Mandarin
- Budget: ¥10 million
- Box office: ¥200 million

Eternal Moment (simplified Chinese: 将爱情进行到底; traditional Chinese: 將愛情进行到底; pinyin: Jiāng ài) is a 2011 Chinese romantic drama film directed by Zhang Yibai and starring Xu Jinglei, Li Yapeng and Chapman To.

The film is a sequel to the television drama, Cherish Our Love Forever (1998), which was also directed by Zhang. The film follows the two leads from that earlier drama (played by Xu Jinglei and Li Yapeng) reuniting after being apart for 12 years.

== Music ==
Faye Wong and Eason Chan recorded the theme song "Because of Love" (因為愛情) for the film.

== Reception ==
Film Business Asia's Derek Elley gave the film a rating of 6 out of 10.
