= A Sentimental Story =

- Also known as: Love Is Sweet and Cruel; A Romantic Story
- Traditional Chinese: 一場風花雪月的事
- Simplified Chinese: 一场风花雪月的事
- Literal meaning: An Occurrence of Wind, Flowers, Snow and the Moon
- Hanyu Pinyin: Yī Chǎng Fēng Huā Xuě Yuè de Shì
- Jyutping: Jat^{1} Coeng^{4} Fung^{3} Faa^{1} Syut^{3} Jyut^{6} dik^{1} Si^{6}
- Created by: Liu Yanming; Sheng Chongqing; Lu Songlin
- Written by: Hai Yan
- Directed by: Zhao Baogang
- Starring: Xu Jinglei; Liu Han-chiang; Jiang Wu; Du Zhiguo; Ding Zhicheng; Fu Biao; Wan Yeung-ming; Li Zhenping; Ji Yuan; Xu Xiulin; Pu Cunxin
- Ending theme: "Feng Hua Xue Yue" (风花雪月) performed by Chen Lin
- Composer: Chen Xiangyu
- Country of origin: China
- Original languages: Mandarin; Cantonese; some English
- No. of episodes: 20

Production
- Executive producer: Wang Xiaozhu
- Producers: Eryong; Sun Yi
- Cinematography: Shen Tao
- Running time: 45 minutes
- Production companies: Hairun International Advertising; Shanghai Television; Hainan Television

A Sentimental Story is a 1997 Chinese romantic thriller television drama series directed by Zhao Baogang and written by Hai Yan. The story is about a young policewoman falling in love with a gangster she pursues. A smash hit, the series is credited with catapulting lead actress Xu Jinglei, a little-known Beijing Film Academy student, to national fame.

== Plot ==
Some years ago, an Italian violin that Niccolò Paganini had supposedly used was stolen from a Beijing orchestra, smuggled overseas, but miraculously recovered a few years later by the Chinese law enforcement. Strangely, nothing about its recovery was ever printed in the press. Spurned by the police, an intrigued journalist (Pu Cunxin) tracks down Lu Yueyue (Xu Jinglei), a former policewoman who now works as a B-girl in a night club. She also refuses to speak on the case, but he proves more resilient than she expects. Finally she agrees to tell him the whole story, under the condition that he never publishes his story—unless she dies.

After leaving China, the violin first landed in Bangkok before being sold to Poon Dai-wai (Wan Yeung-ming) in Hong Kong, who had just inherited his late father's enterprise. Poon gave the violin to Fung Sai-man (Leung Kai-chi), a senior triad boss, as a present, but when one of Fung's employees secretly brought the violin back to him, Poon hid it and denied knowledge before Fung. That night, the defector was assassinated and several of Poon's employees were shot. Poon Dai-wai decided to send his younger brother Poon Siu-wai (Liu Han-chiang) to mainland China to protect him from Fung's wrath.

Lu Yueyue had just begun working for the Ministry of Public Security when they received intelligence from the Hong Kong Police Force about the possible link between Poon Siu-wai and the stolen violin. To her great excitement, she was assigned to the team working on the case.

== Cast and characters ==
- Pu Cunxin as Mr. Hai, the journalist/narrator

Hong Kong

- Liu Han-chiang as Poon Siu-wai, a Hong Kong youngster who just graduated from a high school in Taiwan
- Wan Yeung-ming as Poon Dai-wai, Siu-wai's brother who owns the successful Poon family enterprise
- Wong Bo-mei as Poon Ching-lam, Siu-wai's sister
- Cheung Chan-Sang as Ng Tin-lam, Poon Ching-lam's husband
- Pang Mei-seung as Mrs. Poon, Siu-wai's mother
- Leung Kai-chi as Fung Sai-man, a real estate tycoon who is also a triad boss
- Kou Xiaolie as Baldy Wah, Fung's right-hand man
- Zhang Wang as Roy, an assassin who works for Fung

Beijing

- Xu Jinglei as Lu Yueyue, a young policewoman who just graduated from the Criminal Investigation Police University of China majoring in criminal investigation
- Du Zhiguo as Wu Lichang, leader of the police squad working on the case
- Ding Zhicheng as Li Xianghua, Wu Lichang's deputy
- Jiang Wu as Xue Yu, a young policeman who has a crush on Lu Yueyue
- Fu Biao as Liu Baohua, a senior policeman
- Ji Yuan as Ji Chunlei, a senior policeman
- Xu Xiulin as Lu Yueyue's mother
