= Atheist Like Me =

- Atheist Like Me cover

Studio album by Stanley Huang
- Released: 5 January 2007
- Recorded: 2006–2007
- Genre: Mandopop, pop, R&B, dance, hip hop
- Length: 46:19
- Language: Mandarin, English
- Label: EMI Music Taiwan

Stanley Huang chronology
Shades of my Mind (2004)	Atheist Like Me (2007)	We All Lay Down in the End (2008)

Alternative cover
- Atheist Like Me (Second Version) cover

Atheist Like Me (Chinese: 無神論) is Taiwanese Mandopop artist Stanley Huang's (Chinese: 黃立行) 5th Mandarin studio album. It was released on 5 January 2007 by EMI Music Taiwan.

Two versions were released including Atheist Like Me (Second Version) (無神論 影音慶功版) containing with a DVD of footages from 2007 Stanley Huang 「Atheist Like Me」 Intel Core Duo Live Tour (黃立行「無神論」Intel雙核飛舞Live Tour精華) and also with four music videos.

== Track listing ==
1. 打分數 (Da Fen Shu) - What Number Are You? - 3:32
2. 要 (Yao) - I Wanna - 3:43
3. 無神論 (Wu Shen Lun) - Atheist Like Me - 3:17
4. 禮物 (Li Wu) - The Gift - 4:27
5. 彩虹的軌道 (Cai Hong De Gu Dao) - Chasing Rainbows - 3:46
6. 老師說 (Lao Shi Shuo) - Check Yourself - 3:20
7. 脫離 (Tuo Li) - I Gotta Go - 2:57
8. 小姑娘 (Xiao Gu Niang) - Country Girl - 3:51
9. 大人們 (Da Ren Men) - A Child's View - 4:05
10. 一人世界 (Yi Ren Shi Jie) - Selfishness - 3:04
11. 乖乖牌 (Guai Guai Pai) - Nice Guy feat. Jolin Tsai - 3:17
12. 無神論(英文版) (Wu Shen Lun (Ying Wen Ban)) - Atheist Like Me (English Version) - 3:17
13. 未來 (Wei Lai) - Into The Future - 3:39

== Releases ==
Two editions were released by EMI Music Taiwan:

- 5 January 2007 - Atheist Like Me (CD)
- 2 March 2007 - Atheist Like Me (Second Version) (CD+DVD) (無神論 影音慶功版) (CD+DVD) - includes 4 MV's and 2007 Stanley Huang 「Atheist Like Me」 Intel Core Duo Live Tour (黃立行「無神論」Intel雙核飛舞Live Tour精華)

=== Bonus DVD ===
Atheist Like Me (Second Version)

- Chapter 1 - 「Atheist Like Me」 Intel Core Duo Live Tour
1. "無神論(中文版)" - Atheist Like Me(Chinese Version)
2. "要" - I Wanna
3. "打分數" - What Number Are You?
4. "乖乖牌" - Nice Guy
5. "脫離" - I Gotta Go
6. "禮物" - The Gift
- Chapter 2 - 「Atheist Like Me」 Album Music Video
1. "無神論(中文版)" - Atheist Like Me(Chinese Version) MV
2. "打分數" - What Number Are You? MV
3. "禮物" - The Gift MV
4. "未來" - Into The Future MV
