= String Quartet No. 4 (Ichmouratov) =

Quartet No. 4
- by Airat Ichmouratov
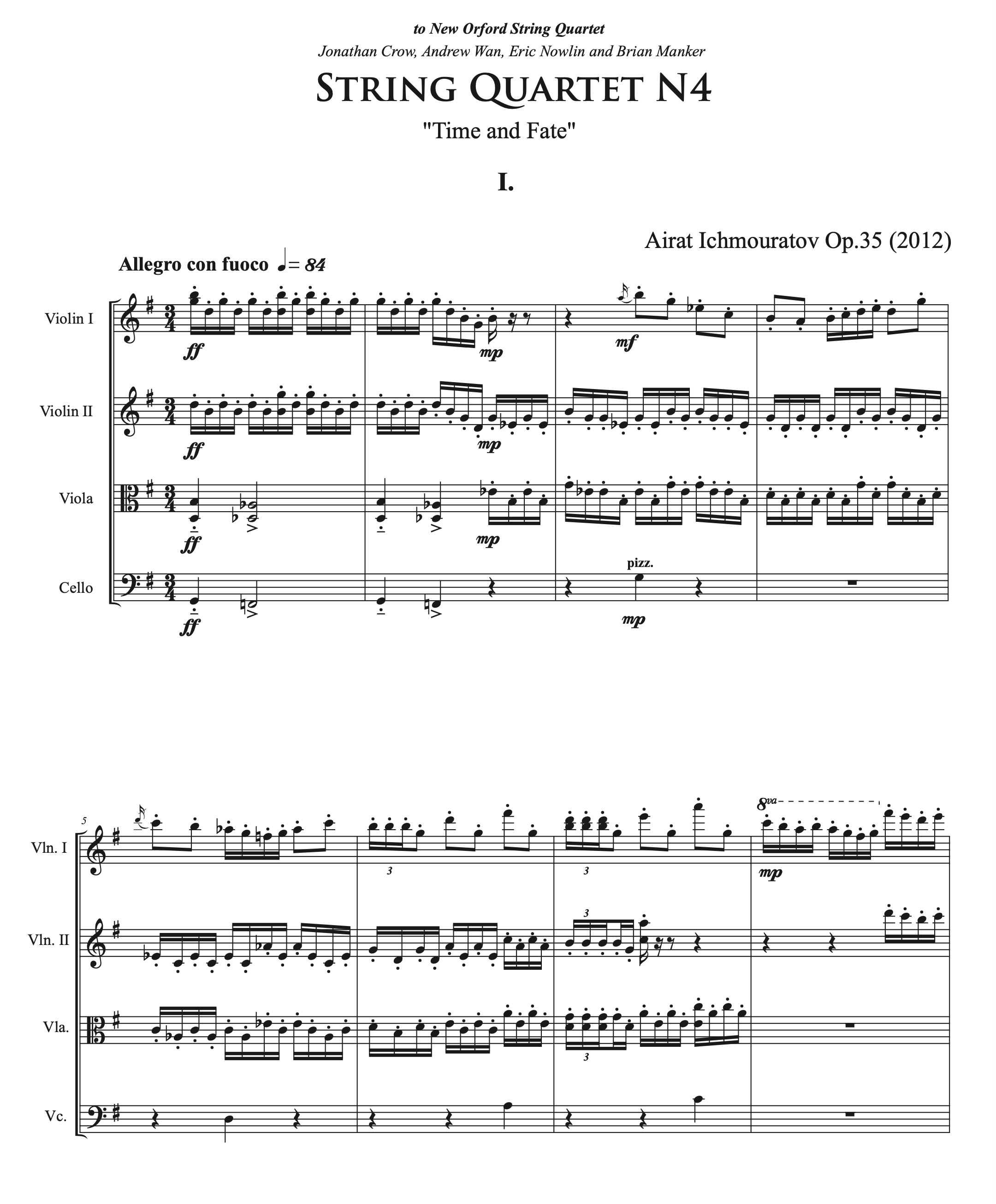
- Airat Ichmouratov, String Quartet N4 "Time and fate" Score, First Page
- Opus: 35
- Composed: 2012
- Dedication: New Orford String Quartet
- Performed: 26 July 2013
- Duration: 31 minutes (approximately)
- Movements: 4
- Scoring: 2 violins, viola, cello.

Airat Ichmouratov's String Quartet No. 4 "Time and Fate", Op. 35, was composed in spring 2012. It was commissioned and premiered by New Orford String Quartet on 26 July 2013 at Orford Arts Centre, Quebec, Canada. Chamber Orchestra version of the quartet (arranged by composer and known as Chamber Symphony N4 Op.35a) was premiered by La Primavera Chamber Orchestra in Kazan, Russia on 3 September 2014 under the composer's baton

== Structure ==
The work comprises four movements:

1. Allegro con fuoco
2. Scherzo
3. Larghetto / Grave
4. Allegro Vivace

A typical performance of the work lasts around thirty one minutes.

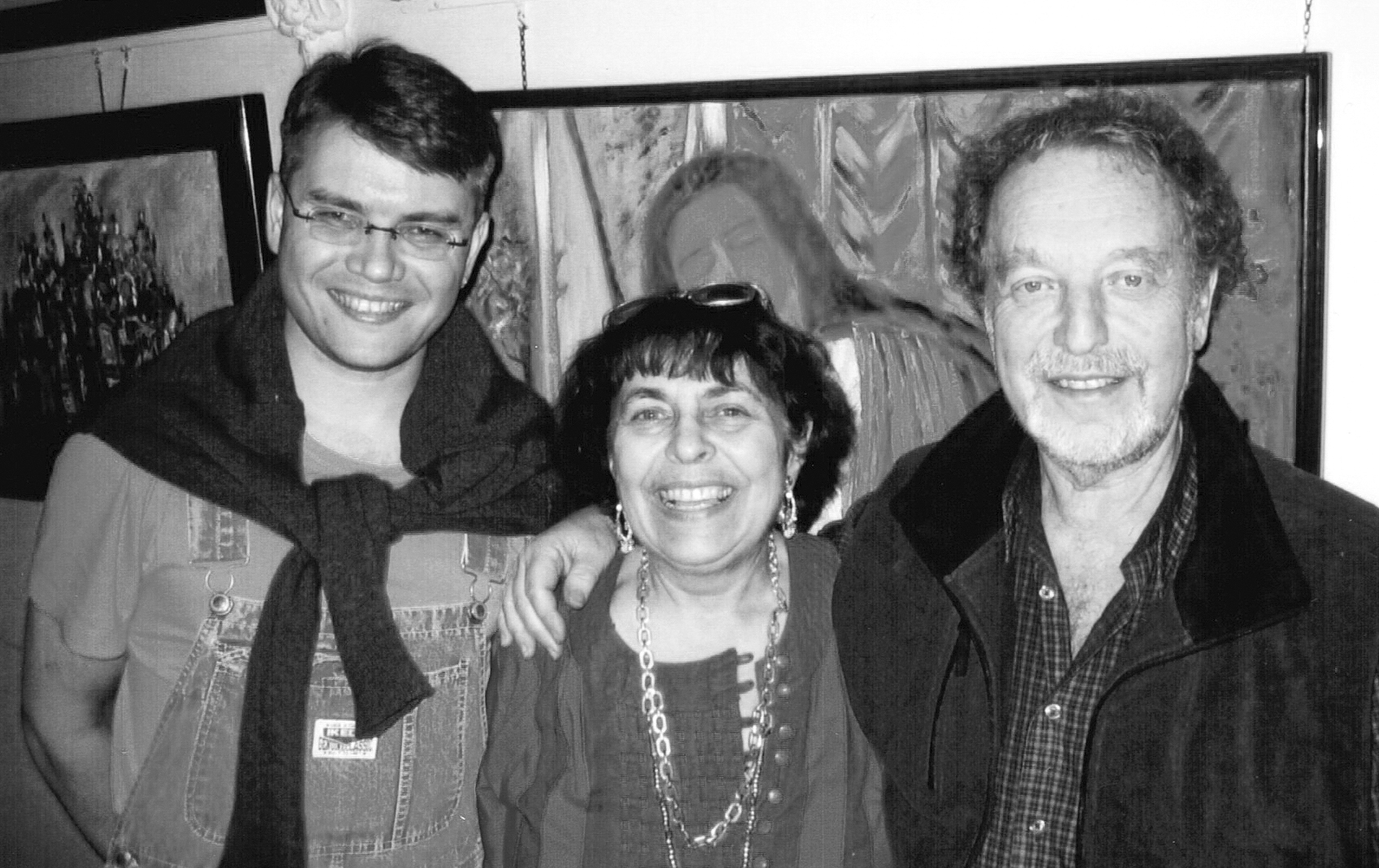
Composer Ichmouratov with Canadian violinist Eleonora Turovsky and her husband, cellist and conductor Yuli Turovsky, in the summer of 2001.

String Quartet No. 4 was composed in the spring of 2012, shortly after the tragic death of the prominent violinist and teacher Eleonora Turovsky, who, according to the composer's own words, was someone he was very close to, almost like a second mother. This event marked the first time in the composer's life when the passage of "time" took on a vividly visual aspect.

The 1st movement - Allegro con fuoco - sets the stage for the quartet's exploration of the interplay between time and fate, driven by personal loss and emotional depth. According to composers own words, the movement opens with a series of clockwork-like rhythms, immediately establishing the "Time" motif.

Main theme in the first movement of Ichmouratov's String Quartet N4, Violin I part

mm. 1–6

The 2nd movement - Scherzo - is an expressive scherzo-valse with uneven changes in time signatures, symbolizing the passage of turbulent times. The harmonic language is rich and diverse, featuring frequent modulations that enhance the movement’s emotional complexity.

Scherzo-Valse theme in the second movement of Ichmouratov's String Quartet N4, Viola part

mm. 1–5

The 3rd movement - Larghetto - opens with a melancholic and reflective theme played by the viola, which introduces the "Fate" motif. This motif, a rising seventh interval (D - F - C♯), serves as the central theme that persists throughout the entire movement. In an interview with Keith Horner about his first Chandos recording of the String Octet "Letter from an Unknown Woman", based on Stefan Zweig's novella of the same name, the composer discusses the same 'Fate' motif, which also appears multiple times in the octet and is characterized by a rising seventh interval (A - C - G♯). The motif emerges as a recurring musical figure of profound thematic significance in the composer's numerous works, making its initial appearance in his Three Romances for Viola. This evolution of the motif can be heard in various composer's works. Often symbolizing themes of destiny and persistence, this motif manifests in various expressions throughout his music.

Opening theme with "Fate" motif in the third movement of Ichmouratov's String Quartet N4, Viola part

mm. 10–17

The 4th movement - Allegro Vivace - begins with a turbulent, again clock-like mechanical entrance, setting an urgent tone. This is followed by an energetic theme that symbolizes the relentless passage of time. The movement then unfolds into a kaleidoscope of episodic themes, each contributing to a complex narrative that leads to a grand culmination, prominently featuring the Fate motif. In the virtuoso coda, the clock theme from the first movement suddenly reappears, driving the quartet towards a highly energetic and dazzling ending.

Opening theme in the 4th movement of Ichmouratov's String Quartet N4, Violin I part

mm. 10–17

== Instrumentation ==
The original score is for 2 violins, viola and cello.

The composer also transcribed the piece for string orchestra, so it is often played by full string sections using more players for each part as well as an added double bass part which usually (but not always) doubles the cello part an octave lower.

== Recording ==
External audio
- The World premiere of String Quartet N4, performed by New Orford String Quartet, 26 July 2013 at Orford Arts Centre
- I. Allegro con fuoco
- II. Scherzo
- III. Larghetto
- IV. Allegro Vivace

- ATMA Classique: Ichmouratov, String Quartet N4: by New Orford String Quartet – Release Date: 16th Mar 2018

== Critical reception ==
The recording of the quartet gained average-to-positive reviews. Frédéric Cardin of Ludwig Van Montreal wrote: "Simple and effective". Terry Robbins of The Whole Note wrote about quartet: "it’s an extremely attractive four-movement work with a particularly lovely third movement.". Steve Bergeron of La Tribune wrote: "very expressive, with beautiful melodies".
