= The Trough (film) =

2018 Hong Kong film by Nick Cheung

- Official film poster
- Traditional Chinese: 低壓槽
- Simplified Chinese: 低压槽
- Hanyu Pinyin: Dī Yā Cáo
- Jyutping: Dai1 Ngaat3 Cou4
- Directed by: Nick Cheung
- Screenplay by: Nick Cheung; Wen Ning
- Produced by: Claudie Chung; Cheung Chi-kwong
- Starring: Nick Cheung; Xu Jinglei; He Jiong; Yu Nan; Michael Miu; Yuen Wah; Maggie Cheung
- Cinematography: Cheung Man-po
- Edited by: Li Ka-wing
- Music by: Chan Kwong-wing; Benson Chen
- Production companies: One Cool Film Production; Bona Film Group; Er Dong Pictures; Beijing Each Media; J.Q. Pictures; Uni Connect Broadcast Production; PJ One Cool Film; Shanghai Gutian Films; Star Talent Production
- Distributed by: Edko Films (Hong Kong); One Cool Pictures (International)
- Release dates: 28 April 2018 (China); 3 May 2018 (Hong Kong)
- Running time: 112 minutes
- Countries: Hong Kong; China
- Languages: Cantonese; English
- Budget: US$22 million
- Box office: US$6.06 million

The Trough, formerly known as Taste of Crime, is a 2018 Hong Kong neo-noir crime thriller film written and directed by Nick Cheung, who also stars alongside Xu Jinglei, He Jiong and Yu Nan.

== Plot ==
Undercover police officer Yu Chau (Nick Cheung) has successfully apprehended many criminals in the city of full of evil. Because a child abduction case, Yu's identity is starting to be brought to light, attracting the hunt from criminal groups. In order to adhere to justice within his heart, Yu does not hesitate to risk his life to start a life and death battle of wits against the leader of the mysterious criminal group.

== Cast ==
- Nick Cheung as Yu Chau (于秋)
- Xu Jinglei as The Boss (宫田惠美子)
  - Keira Wang plays The Boss as a child.
- He Jiong as Jim
- Yu Nan as Jackie (special appearance)
- Michael Miu as Ching Wan (程昀; special appearance)
- Yuen Wah as Chun Wah (春華; special appearance)
- Maggie Cheung Ho-yee as Diane Cheung (張書文; special appearance)
- Lam Suet as Nine Lame Fingers (九指跛)
- Louis Cheung as Jeejah
- Li Haitao as Zhong (阿仲忠)
- Zaha Fathima as The girl
- Chris Collins as Frankie
- Paul Chun as Chief Lee (李局長; guest appearance)
- Ni Dahong as Mr. Ren (任先生; guest appearance)
- Philip Ng as Leader of the security guards (guest appearance)

== Production ==
Production for The Trough began in January 2017. Filming took place in Shanghai, Japan and Thailand before wrapping up on 9 May 2017 in Shanghai.

== Release ==
The film's first teaser trailer was released on 11 March 2017 which was also presented at the 2017 Hong Kong FILMART. The film was theatrically released in Hong Kong on 3 May 2018.

== Box office ==
The Trough was a box-office bomb, grossing only US$6,061,514 worldwide against a budget of US$22 million.

In Hong Kong, the film grossed a total of HK$4,716,276 during its theatrical run from 3 May to 6 June 2018.

In China, the film grossed a total of CN¥34,909,000 at the box office.
