= Xu Jinglei =

Chinese actress and film director

- Born: April 16, 1974 (age 52); Beijing, China
- Education: Beijing Film Academy
- Occupations: Actress; director
- Years active: 1994–present
- Organization(s): Beijing Kaila Pictures Co., Ltd.
- Awards: San Sebastián International Film Festival – Silver Shell for Best Director (Letter from an Unknown Woman); Huabiao Awards – Outstanding New Actress (I Love You); Golden Rooster Awards – Best New Director (My Father and I); Golden Rooster Awards – Best Supporting Actress (Far From Home); Hundred Flowers Awards – Best Actress (Spring Subway)

Chinese name
- Traditional Chinese: 徐靜蕾
- Simplified Chinese: 徐静蕾
Transcriptions
Standard Mandarin
- Hanyu Pinyin: Xú Jìnglěi
Yue: Cantonese
- Jyutping: Ceoi4 Zing6-leoi4

Xu Jinglei (Chinese: 徐静蕾, born April 16, 1974) is a Chinese actress and filmmaker. Regarded as one of the Four Dan Actresses in China, Xu rose to fame with television series A Sentimental Story (1997) and Cherish Our Love Forever (1998), followed by TV series Divine Retribution (2000) and films Spring Subway (2002), Confession of Pain (2006), The Warlords (2007), and Eternal Moment (2011).

After making her directorial debut with My Father and I (2003), Xu established herself as one of the most successful female directors in China with such films as Letter from an Unknown Woman (2004), for which she won the Best Director at the San Sebastian International Film Festival, Go Lala Go! (2010), Dear Enemy (2011) and The Missing (2017).

== Early life ==
On April 16, 1974, Xu was born in Chaoyang, Beijing, China. Her father Xu Zijian worked at the Beijing Light Bulb Factory before founding the Great Wall Neon Factory, while her mother Yu Shurong worked at the Beijing Chemical Factory. Xu has a younger brother Xu Xinyu.

Xu studied in the calligraphy class in Beijing Children's Palace and learned the Tang poems by heart under the strict education of her father. She was recommended for admission to Beijing No. 80 High School because of her extraordinary calligraphy skills. She initially determined to study make-up in the Stage Art Department of The Central Academy of Drama, but was declined. She was instead admitted to the Performing Arts Department, Beijing Film Academy next year.

== Career ==
=== Acting ===
In her freshman year of 1994, Xu made her acting debut in TV series My Deskmate. She gained wide popularity for her roles in TV series A Sentimental Story (1997), where she played a policewoman who falls for a gangster, and in Cherish Our Love Forever (1998), China's first idol drama. In 1999, she won the Chinese Filmmakers Association's Best Performance Award for her first major film role in Spicy Love Soup (1997). Xu solidified her success with a series of critically acclaimed films, winning the Huabiao Award for Outstanding New Actress for I Love You (2002), the Hundred Flowers Award for Best Actress for Spring Subway (2002), and the Golden Rooster Award for Best Supporting Actress for Far From Home (2002). She then starred in blockbusters such as Confession of Pain (2006) and The Warlords (2007). She reunited with her Cherish Our Love Forever co-star Li Yapeng in Eternal Moment (2011), a film sequel to their breakout show. She took an extended hiatus from acting since Dear Enemy (2011) and switched her career focus to filmmaking and talent management. She made a comeback with her performance in the science fiction thriller Battle of Memories (2017).

=== Directing ===
Xu made her directorial debut with My Father and I (2003), which she also starred in. The film, China's first independent production, tackles the delicate relationship between a Chinese father and his daughter, winning her the Golden Rooster Award for Best New Director. Her second directorial effort, Letter from an Unknown Woman (2004), was based on Stefan Zweig's novel of the same name, winning her the Silver Shell for Best Director at the San Sebastian International Film Festival in Spain. Xu then collaborated with Chinese writer Wang Shuo in Dreams Come True (2006), an experimental film shot in one setting. Unlike her previous two films, Dreams Come True was panned by critics. In 2010, Xu directed and starred in Go Lala Go!, which was adapted from Li Ke's bestseller of the same name about a young woman's growth in the workplace. In 2014, Xu ranked fifth on the Chinese directors value list, as "the first female director who has directed six films independently and has earned more than 100 million yuan at the domestic box office and won the international Film Festival awards." Xu continued to direct romantic features Dear Enemy (2011) and Somewhere Only We Know (2015), which were moderately successful at the box office. Deviating from her former productions was The Missing (2017), an action cop thriller which proved to be a commercial flop. She also produced an alien-themed web-series My 200-Million-Year-Old Classmate (2018) based on the webfiction of the same name.

=== Others ===
Since 2003, Xu has been an acting teacher at Beijing Film Academy.

Xu launched her blog in late 2005 to great success. In 2006, she became the world's most popular blogger, with the most incoming links of any blog in any language on the Internet, according to blog search engine Technorati.

In 2006, Xu founded Kaila Pictures Corporation, a production and management company. She also launched a website, a series of digital magazines, and an accessory line, but all were shut down in the early 2010s.

In 2007, Xu cooperated with Founder Electronics Cooperation to release her personal calligraphy computer characters in FounderType, called "Founder Jinglei Simplified", which was adopted by Starbucks China in its cafe shops.

In 2008, Xu was awarded the honorary title of "China Environmental Ambassador" at an awarding ceremony cosponsored by the Ministry of Environmental Protection and the United Nations Development Program on World Earth Day.

In November 2012, Xu participated in the fourth season of China's Got Talent and acted as the judge. In May 2018, Xu participated in the third season of the Crossover Singer, a singing competition show, aired on BTV1.

Xu launched an education and film fund with 200,000 yuan (US$25,000) to support Braille publications, education for the children of migrant workers, and filming.

== Personal life ==
From 1994 to 2004, Xu Jinglei was in a relationship with writer Wang Shuo, during which she reportedly took a three-year break to be with musician Sanbao.

In July 2005, Xu was photographed in Beijing on a date with musician Zhang Yadong, shortly after actress Gao Yuanyuan made public of her 5-year relationship with Zhang. In January, 2006, Gao declared that she had broken up with Zhang. The next month Xu was photographed in Beijing meeting both Zhang and actor Huang Jue on the same day. Xu then had a relationship with Huang until their breakup in 2010.

Since their collaboration in Go Lala Go! in 2010, Xu has been in a relationship with Taiwanese-American singer-actor Stanley Huang. Since 2017, they have been living in the US.

== Filmography ==
=== Film ===
Year	English title	Chinese title	Role	Notes
1996	Tough Guy	忽然丈夫		
1997	My Love to Tell You	我的爱对你说		
1997	Life Express	一夜富贵		
1997	Spicy Love Soup	愛情麻辣燙	Lin Yuqing	
1998	The Storm Riders	風雲	Feng Wu	
2002	Dazzling	花眼	Xiao Hao	
2002	Spring Subway	開往春天的地鐵	Xiao Hui	
2002	Far From Home	我的美丽乡愁	Xue'er	
2003	I Love You	我爱你	Du Xiaojie	
2003	Heroic Duo	雙雄	Zhuo Min	
2003	My Father and I	我和爸爸	Xiao Yu	also director and screenwriter
2004	Brothers	兄弟	Xue'er	
2004	Last Love, First Love	最后的爱,最初的爱	Fang Min	
2005	Letter from an Unknown Woman	一个陌生女人的来信	Young girl	also director and screenwriter
2006	Dreams May Come	梦想照进现实	Actor	also director and screenwriter
2006	Confession of Pain	伤城	Zhou Shuzhen	
2007	The Warlords	投名状	Lian Sheng	
2009	Shinjuku Incident	新宿事件	Yuko Eguchi	
2010	Go Lala Go!	杜拉拉升职记	Du Lala	also director and screenwriter
2011	Eternal Moment	将爱情进行到底	Wen Hui	
2011	Dear Enemy	亲密敌人	Ai Mi	also director
2013	Better and Better	越來越好之村晚	Liu Shufen	
2014	One Step Away	触不可及	Ying Zi	
2015	Somewhere Only We Know	有一个地方只有我们知道	Chen Lanxin	also director
2017	The Missing	綁架者		also director
2017	Battle of Memories	记忆大师	Zhang Daichen	
2018	The Trough	低压槽	HuiMeizi	
2018	Good Luck Dad	让我怎么相信你		also Title Design

Xu's Filmography as a director
Time	Film title
2003	My Father and I
2005	Letter from an Unknown Woman
2006	Dreams May Come
2010	Go Lala Go!
2011	Dear Enemy
2015	Somewhere Only We Know
2017	The Missing

=== Television series ===
Year	English title	Chinese title	Role	Notes
1994	My Old Classmate	同桌的你		
1996	Beijing Love Story	北京爱情故事	Dan Hong	
1997	A Sentimental Story	一場風花雪月的事	Lu Yueyue	
1998	Long Tang	龙堂	Ding Min	
1998	Cherish Our Love Forever	将爱情进行到底	Wen Hui	
1999	Thunderstorm Rider	霹雳菩萨	Ah De	
1999	Here Comes Fortune	财神到	Xiao Yu	
1999	Love Letter	情书	Xia Lin	
2000	New Romance Generation	新言情时代	Yi Fei	television film
2000	Divine Retribution	世纪之战	Yuen Siu-mui / Siu-kuk	
2000	Family of Lu Ao	旅"奥"一家人		
2001	Accumulating All My Love	堆积情感	Yu Jingjing	
2001	Let Love Make the Decision	让爱作主	Lou Jiayi	
2002	Sky Lovers	天空下的缘分	Du Mai	
2005	Doukou Nianhua	豆蔻年华	Lin Lan	
2018	200 Million Years Old Classmate	同学两亿岁		also executive producer

== Awards and nominations ==
San Sebastián International Film Festival
Time	Award's title	Awarded work	Status
2004	Silver Shell Award for Best Director of the 52nd San Sebastián International Film Festival	Letter from an Unknown Woman	Awarded

Huabiao Awards
Time	Award's title	Awarded work	Award
2003	Best Newcomer of the 9th China Film Huabiao Awards	I Love You	Awarded
2003	Outstanding Actress Award of the 9th China Film Huabiao Awards	Far From Home	Nominated
