= New Orford String Quartet =

The New Orford String Quartet is a Canadian string quartet formed in July 2009. It is one of Canada's premiere chamber ensembles. The name honours the Orford Arts Centre in the province of Quebec, where the ensemble gave its first public concert, and the original Orford String Quartet that was formed in June 1965 and active until July 1991.

== Members ==
The members of the New Orford String Quartet are all principal players in the Montreal, Toronto and Detroit Symphony Orchestras.

- Jonathan Crow and Andrew Wan, violins (alternating first and second violin)
- Sharon Wei, viola
- Brian Manker, cello

== Recordings ==
- Schubert: Quartet in G major, D. 887 and Beethoven: Quartet in F major, Op. 135, released in 2011 and nominated for a JUNO Award in 2012
