= Stanley Huang =

Taiwanese-American actor and singer

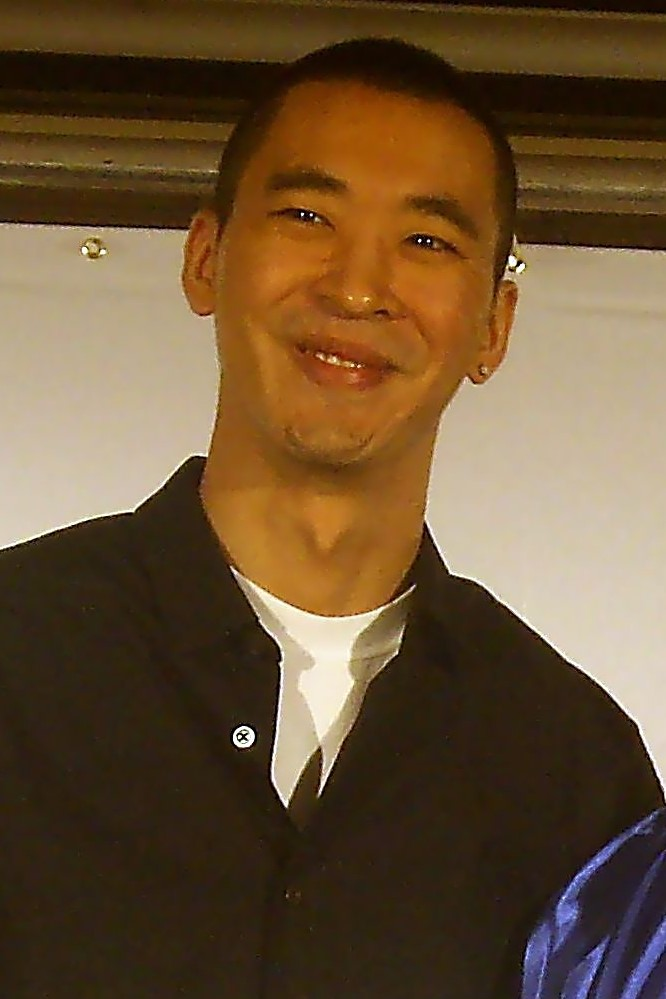
- Huang at 2007 Taipei IT Month
- Born: Huang Li Xing; 21 September 1974 (age 51); Orange County, California, U.S.
- Occupations: Singer-songwriter, actor, record producer
- Years active: 1991–present
- Awards: Golden Melody Awards – Best Male Mandarin Artist; 2005 Shades of My Mind

Chinese name
- Traditional Chinese: 黃立行
- Simplified Chinese: 黄立行
Transcriptions
Standard Mandarin
- Hanyu Pinyin: Huáng Lìxíng
- Musical career
- Origin: Taiwan
- Genres: Mandopop, R&B, hip hop
- Instrument: Vocal
- Labels: Virgin Records (2000–2005); Capitol Records (2006–2008); Warner Music (2008–2010)
- Website: Stanley 黃立行

Stanley Huang (born 21 September 1974) is a Taiwanese-American singer and actor.

== Early life ==
Huang was born and raised in Orange County, California. His family moved there before he was born. He is the brother of Jeffrey Huang and cousin of Steven Lin. His cousin is Hollywood film producer Dan Lin.

== Career ==
Huang started his career in the boyband L.A. Boyz with his older brother, Jeffrey and a cousin, Steven Lin.

After leaving the band, Huang started a solo career with his debut album, Your Side, in 2000. He has made five studio albums up to 2008, and one compilation album in 2003. Most notable are Circus Monkey (2001) and Shades of My Mind (2004). He received several nominations at the 16th Golden Melody Awards for the latter, Taiwan's version of the Grammys. He ended up winning the Best Male Mandarin Artist award, beating media favourites such as Leehom Wang and Jay Chou. Over his career, Huang has collaborated with several singers, including Elva Hsiao, Rene Liu, and Jolin Tsai. Huang has remained active in writing and producing songs for his older brother's hip-hop band, Machi. Huang has seldom received criticism for his music. Many appreciate Huang's rock and heavy metal style. In 2006, Huang wrote and featured in Jolin Tsai song, "Nice Guy" (乖乖牌), for the 2006 album Dancing Diva, after signing to Capitol Music.

== Other ==
Aside from music, Huang also acted in the provocative Taiwanese film, Twenty Something Taipei (台北晚9朝5), which is about the clubbing scene of Taipei. He featured in a 1992 video called Modern Republic (摩登共和国) when he was part of the L.A. Boyz. He published a book, Between Stanley, that tells the story of being caught in between two worlds, one of his life in LA and his roots in Taipei.

== Discography ==
=== Studio albums ===
| # | Album title | Release date | Language(s) | Label | Genre |
|---|---|---|---|---|---|
| 1st | Your Side (妳身邊) | 1 March 2000 (Worldwide) | Mandarin, Taiwanese | Virgin Records | Mandopop |
| 2nd | Circus Monkey (馬戲團猴子) | 12 January 2001 (Worldwide) | Mandarin, Taiwanese | Virgin Records | Mandopop |
| 3rd | Stan Up | 16 November 2002 (Worldwide) | Mandarin | Virgin Records | Mandopop |
| 4th | Shades of my Mind (黑的意念) | 29 October 2004 (Worldwide) | Mandarin, Taiwanese | Virgin Records | Mandopop |
| 5th | Atheist Like Me (無神論) | 5 January 2007 (Worldwide) | Mandarin, English | Capitol Records | Mandopop |
| 6th | We All Lay Down in the End (最後只好躺下來) | 5 December 2008 (Worldwide) | Mandarin | Warner Music Taiwan (華納唱片) | Mandopop |

=== Compilation albums ===
| # | Album title | Release date | Language(s) | Label | Genre |
|---|---|---|---|---|---|
| 1st | Sound Wave (音浪) | 28 November 2003 (Worldwide) | Mandarin, Taiwanese | Virgin Records | Mandopop |

=== Singles ===
- 3 December 2008: "皮在癢" (Pi Zai Yang) (Taiwanese song)
- 25 August 2011: "向完美說不" (Xiang Wan Mei Shuo Bu) (used in commercial for Mazda3 Xing Cheng)
- 16 March 2010: "成吉思汗" (Cheng Ji Si Han) – Genghis Khan (theme song for Genghis Khan Online, a Chinese MMORPG online game)
- 5 December 2010: "我是明星" (Wo Shi Ming Xing) – I'm a Star (used in a commercial for Casio G-Shock)
- 14 March 2010: "Go", Go Lala Go! theme song
- 5 December 2011: "超新星" (Chao Xin Xing) – Supernova, Dear Enemy theme song

=== Photo books ===
- 2007: I Love Super! (我愛大明星：驚嘆號) with Show Lo, Jolin Tsai, and Rainie Yang.

== Filmography ==
| Year | Title | Role |
|---|---|---|
| 1992 | Modern Republic | Himself |
| 2002 | Twenty Something Taipei | 小馬 (Xiao Ma) |
| 2010 | Go Lala Go! | 王伟 (David) |
| 2011 | Dear Enemy | Derek |
| 2015 | Somewhere Only We Know | Qi Xin |
| 2017 | The Missing | Yang Nian |
