= Dear Enemy (film) =

亲密敌人 Dear Enemy
- Dear Enemy theatrical release poster
- Directed by: Xu Jinglei
- Written by: Wang Yun; Zhao Meng; Xu Jinglei; Mike Parish; Liu Liyang
- Produced by: Andrew Lau; Jiao Aimin; Meng Bing
- Starring: Xu Jinglei; Stanley Huang; Gigi Leung; Aarif Rahman; Christy Chung; Zhao Baogang; Michael Wong
- Cinematography: Jason Kwan; Han Xiaosu
- Edited by: Zhang Jia
- Music by: Jae Chong
- Production companies: Beijing Kaila Picture Co.; China Film Group Corporation; Jiangsu OMNIJOI Moive Co.; Scene Productions; Wanda Media; Western Movie Group Company Limited
- Distributed by: China Film Group Corporation
- Release date: 23 December 2011 (China)
- Running time: 98 minutes
- Country: China
- Language: Mandarin

Dear Enemy (simplified Chinese: 亲密敌人; traditional Chinese: 親密敵人) is a 2011 Chinese romantic comedy film which sets its background in financial industry. It represents how bankers conduct the act of mergers and acquisitions. During this process, a pair of lovers, serving for two warring investment banks and having broken up half a year ago, get back together.

== Synopsis ==
Derek (Stanley Huang), a managing director of an investment bank, is a little bit anxious. The A corporation he works for is now planning to merge with B corporation. The problem is, however, his ex-girlfriend Amy (Xu Jinglei) works as a financial consultant in B.

After meeting again, the couple compete fiercely and both try to defeat the other. As the two people who know each other best, they are the most troublesome opponents of each other. At the same time, they begin to open their hearts to each other again gradually. One night in Chengdu, they finally pour out their love and face it sincerely.

== Main actors ==
=== Amy (played by Xu Jinglei) ===
Female, 30 years old, an investment bank official. When Derek, her boyfriend, is busy with work and ignores her too much, she takes the lead in breaking up bravely. Half a year later, when reunited, what she has to face is not only the competition between Derek and her but also her hidden love's coming back.

=== Derek (played by Stanley Huang) ===
Male, 30 years old, an investment bank official. With high IQ and low EQ, he is a real workaholic. Having no time for a girlfriend, they break up formally. However, he still cannot understand what on earth Amy is unsatisfied with when meeting again. The girl, once the lover, has become his strongest rival. As for him, he has never completely given up on his love.

=== Rebecca (played by Gigi Leung) ===
Female, 30 years old, assistant of Derek, and also a friend of Derek and Amy. She is the typical confidante. Though having loved Derek for many years, she never tells Derek and keeps it hidden deeply in heart.

== See also ==
- Go Lala Go!
