= Go Lala Go! =

- Film poster
- Directed by: Xu Jinglei
- Written by: Xu Jinglei; Wang Yun; Zhao Meng
- Produced by: Patrick S. Cunningham; Han Sanping; Jiang Tao; Zhang Yibai; Han Xiaoli; Dan Mintz; Shi Dongming; Wu Bing; Zhao Haicheng
- Starring: Xu Jinglei; Karen Mok; Stanley Huang; Pace Wu; Li Ai; Alice Wang
- Cinematography: Jiang Liwei
- Edited by: Zhang Jia
- Music by: Zhang Yadong; An Wei
- Production company: DMG Entertainment
- Distributed by: China Film Group Corporation
- Release date: 15 April 2010 (China)
- Running time: 100 minutes
- Country: China
- Language: Mandarin
- Box office: CN¥124,530,000

Go Lala Go! (simplified Chinese: 杜拉拉升职记; traditional Chinese: 杜拉拉升職記; pinyin: Dù Lālā shēngzhí jì; lit. 'Du Lala's promotion') is a 2010 Chinese romantic comedy film directed by Xu Jinglei. Film producer Patrick S. Cunningham collaborated with Xu Jinglei, and this film is considered one of the most successful collaborations between a Chinese director and American producer.

== About ==
Go Lala Go! was about a Chinese woman in Beijing who learns how to balance a relationship and professional work in a work place. It was directed by Xu Jinglei, who also stars as the title character. The film is based on a novel, Du Lala's Promotion, by Li Ke. Other actors in the film include Stanley Huang and Karen Mok.

The costumes for Go Lala Go! were designed by Patricia Field, which caused the South China Morning Post to make comparisons to the American television series, Sex in the City which was also costumed by Field.

Go Lala Go! was released to Mainland Chinese audiences on 15 April 2010, where it competed for ticket sales with the American remake, Clash of the Titans.

After the success of "Go Lala Go!", Xu Jinglei directed another film Dear Enemy and co-starred with Stanley Huang again. The film is said to be like an updated and improved version of "Go Lala Go!"

== Reception ==
Patrick Frater of Variety called the film "a precursor to the current wave of Chinese contemporary romance films."

== Cast ==
- Xu Jinglei as Du Lala
- Karen Mok as Mei Gui (Rose)
- Kaitong Jiang as Xiao Bao
- Peter Loehr as He Hao De
- Ningfeng Song as Du Lala's young brother
- Stanley Huang as Wang Wei
- Pace Wu as Helen
- Li Ai as Eva
- Xiaoming Su as Du Lala's previous HR
- Jing-ying Wang
- Jianxin Wu as Li Wenhua
- Heping Xiao as Li Si Te
- Baogang Zhao as Du Lala's previous boss

== Film song ==
- Karen Mok - Multiple choice questions（選擇題）
- Stanley Huang - Go！

== Awards and nominations ==
Awards	Category	Name	Result
31st Hundred Flowers Awards	Best Picture		Nominated
31st Hundred Flowers Awards	Best Newcomer	Li Ai	Nominated
31st Hundred Flowers Awards	Best Supporting Actress	Karen Mok	Nominated
Huading Awards 2010 - Best Supporting Actress in a Motion Picture		Karen Mok	Nominated
2nd Macau International Movie Festival	Best Supporting Actress	Karen Mok	Nominated
2nd Macau International Movie Festival	Best Cinematography	Jian Liwei	Nominated
2nd Macau International Movie Festival	Best Director	Xu Jinglei	Nominated
China Film Director's Guild Awards 2011	Best Young Director	Xu Jinglei	Won
Chinese Film Media Awards 2011	Most Anticipated Actress	Xu Jinglei	Nominated
Chinese American Film Festival 2010	Best Director	Xu Jinglei	Won
Chinese American Film Festival 2010	Outstanding Film		Won

== Sequel ==
A sequel, Go Lala Go 2, was released on 4 December 2015.

== See also ==
- Dear Enemy
- Go Lala Go 2
