= Huabiao Award for Outstanding New Actress =

Annual Chinese film award

The Huabiao Award for Outstanding New Actress was first awarded in 1998.

== Winners & nominations ==
=== 2010s ===
Year	Number	Actress	Film
2013	15th	Yang Zishan	So Young
2013	15th	Ni Ni	The Flowers of War
2011	14th	Zhou Dongyu	Under the Hawthorn Tree
2011	14th	Liu Dong	The Generation After 80s

=== 2000s ===
Year	Number	Actress	Film
2009	13th	Xu Yun	My left hand
2009	13th	Wang Ning	Deng Pingshou
2007	12th	Fan Zhibo	Non Fragrance
2007	12th	Su Li	Yang Dezhi Around the City
2005	11th	Zhang Jingchu	Huayao Bride In Shangri-La
2005	11th	Su Yan	The Tide
2004	10th	Liang Jing	The Law Of Romance
2004	10th	Fan Bingbing	Cell Phone
2004	10th	Zheng Luoqian	Splendid Season
2003	9th	Xu Jinglei	I Love You
2003	9th	Yi Chunde	Marching Towards the Sun
2003	9th	Zhang Yan	Warm Spring
2002	8th	Zhou Li	Frequency For Victory
2001	7th	Dong Jie	Happy Times
2000	6th	Chen Xi	Ice and Fire
2000	6th	Zhang Ziyi	The Road Home

=== 1990s ===
Year	Number	Actress	Film
1999	5th	He Miao	The Happy Old Home
1998	4th	Yan Danchen	Flowering season, Rainy season
