= Howard Koch (screenwriter) =

American screenwriter and playwright (1901-1995)

- Born: December 12, 1901; New York City, US
- Died: August 17, 1995 (aged 93); Kingston, New York, US
- Education: St. Stephen's College; Columbia University
- Notable work: Casablanca, co-writer
- Spouse: Anne Green (m. 1944)
- Children: 3

Howard Everard Koch (December 12, 1901 – August 17, 1995) was an American playwright and screenwriter. He was best known for co-writing the Casablanca (1942) screenplay, for which he shared an Academy Award. In 1947 he was one of the "Hollywood Nineteen", the initial group of so-called "unfriendly" film artists targeted by the House Un-American Activities Committee. After ending up on the Hollywood blacklist, Koch moved to England and wrote under a pseudonym before returning to the U.S. and resuming his screenwriting career.

== Background ==
Koch was born in New York City, the only child of middle-class Jewish parents. He grew up in Kingston, New York and was a precocious student, entering St. Stephen's College (later renamed Bard College) at age 16. In his memoir, he attributed his awakening social conscience to a St. Stephen's class that he took as a sophomore. It was taught by radical sociologist Lyford P. Edwards, who sent his students to visit prisons, picket lines, etc., to learn first-hand about social issues. Koch chose law as a profession and attended Columbia Law School, graduating with an LL.B in 1925.

== Career ==
While practicing law in Hartsdale, New York in the late 1920s, Koch began to write plays. Two of his first works were produced on Broadway: a comedy, Great Scott!, in 1929 and a drama, Give Us This Day, in 1933. His play The Lonely Man opened in Chicago in 1937 under the auspices of the Federal Theater Project. Among those impressed with the play was John Houseman. The following year, when he co-founded with Orson Welles the CBS Radio series The Mercury Theatre on the Air, Houseman hired Koch as a staff writer. One of Koch's assignments was to adapt the H. G. Welles science fiction novel The War of the Worlds. Koch's script, co-written with Anne Froelick and titled "Invasion from Mars", was broadcast on October 30, 1938. The radio drama panicked some listeners with its news bulletin-style depiction of Martian spaceships landing in New Jersey.

Koch's radio work brought him to the attention of the film studios. He became a contract writer with Warner Bros. His first screenplay credit was for The Sea Hawk. He enjoyed a string of successes with The Letter (1940), Shining Victory (1941), Sergeant York (1941) (which earned him and John Huston an Oscar nomination for Best Original Screenplay), and In This Our Life (1942). Next, he co-scripted the film Casablanca (1942) with Julius and Philip Epstein. It was an adaptation of the play, Everybody Comes to Rick's. In describing the Casablanca writing process in a 1971 interview, Koch said he did not collaborate with the Epstein brothers; he worked on the screenplay after they had made their contributions and left the project. All three writers received an Academy Award for Best Adapted Screenplay. Among his later efforts, Koch cited Letter from an Unknown Woman (1948), adapted from the Stefan Zweig novella and directed by Max Ophüls, as a personal favorite.

In 1943, at the request of Jack L. Warner of Warner Bros., Koch was tasked with rewriting the screenplay for Mission to Moscow, a film adaptation of the bestselling book Mission to Moscow by Joseph E. Davies, former U.S. ambassador to the Soviet Union. The film had the backing of President Franklin Roosevelt who wanted American audiences to better understand their Soviet allies fighting Nazi Germany in World War II. After the war, the film triggered a political backlash because of its positive portrayal of Joseph Stalin and the Soviet Union.

In September 1947, Koch was one of the "unfriendly nineteen" film artists subpoenaed by the House Un-American Activities Committee (HUAC) as part of a Congressional investigation into Communist infiltration of the motion picture industry. While he was a longtime supporter of leftist and progressive causes, there was no evidence that Koch was a Communist or ever belonged to the Communist Party (other Hollywood Communists later asserted he was not a Party member); nevertheless, he was tainted by his association with the Mission to Moscow film.

After the HUAC named Koch, his Warner Bros. contract was terminated; however, he was not banned right away from working in Hollywood. He considered himself "graylisted" where he still received a few writing assignments, but would often see his projects cancelled by advertisers or studio executives. He consulted with entertainment lawyer Martin Gang, known as the best "clearance lawyer" during the Hollywood blacklist. Koch decided he would not "name names" to the HUAC as a means of clearing himself, and so he did not become one of Gang's clients. In June 1950, Koch was included in the Red Channels pamphlet as a Communist sympathizer. By 1951 he was blacklisted.

He left the country with his children and his wife Anne Green—also an accomplished writer, and also named to the HUAC. They took up residence in England where they joined other American blacklistees in exile. Koch and his wife wrote for five years for film and television. They sold scripts for the British TV series, The Adventures of Robin Hood, using the pseudonyms "Peter Howard" and "Anne Rodney". He also used the Peter Howard pseudonym when writing the Joseph Losey-directed film, The Intimate Stranger (1956).

In 1956, the Koch family returned to the U.S. and settled in Woodstock, New York. Koch sought help from high-profile lawyer Ed Williams to get himself removed from the blacklist. Williams' efforts were successful, and Koch resumed writing under his own name. His next screenplays included The Greengage Summer (1961), The War Lover (1962), and The Fox (1967).

In his last decades, Koch engaged in various writing projects. He wrote a book about the War of the Worlds radio broadcast. He also worked on a novel, never completed, called Invasion from Mars. In 1979 he published a memoir, As Time Goes By.

== Death ==
On August 17, 1995, Howard Koch died in Kingston Hospital in Kingston, New York. He was 93.

== Works ==
Plays

- Great Scott! (1929).
- Give Us This Day (1933).
- The Lonely Man (1937).
- In Time to Come (1940). Co-written with John Huston.
- The Albatross (1963).
- A Revolutionary Affair (1967).
- Dead Letters (1971).

Books

- Invasion from Mars, ed. Orson Welles, Dell 1949.
- The Panic Broadcast, Little, Brown and Company 1970, Avon Books 1971.
- Casablanca: Script and Legend, Overlook Press 1973.
- As Time Goes By: Memoirs of a Writer, Harcourt Brace Jovanovich 1979.

Short stories

- "Invasion from Inner Space", in Star Science Fiction Stories #6, ed. Frederik Pohl, Ballantine 1959.

Articles

- "A Playwright Looks at the 'Filmwright'". Sight and Sound. 19 (5): 210–14. July 1950.
- "Twilight of the Gods: Script to Screen with Max Ophüls". In Corliss, Richard (ed.). The Hollywood Screenwriters. pp. 125–132. Discus Books 1972. LCCN 72-87848.

Anthologies

- Invaders of Earth, ed. Groff Conklin, Vanguard 1952, Pocket 1955, Tempo 1962.
- The Treasury of Science Fiction Classics, ed. Harold W. Kuebler, Hanover House 1954.
- The Armchair Science Reader, ed. Isabel S. Gordon & Sophie Sorkin, Simon & Schuster 1959.
- Enemies in Space, ed. Groff Conklin, Digit 1962.
- Contact, ed. Noel Keyes, Paperback Library 1963.
- Speculations, ed. Thomas E. Sanders, Glencoe Press 1973.
- Bug-Eyed Monsters, ed. Anthony Cheetham, Panther 1974.
