= Letter from an Unknown Woman =

1922 novella by Stefan Zweig

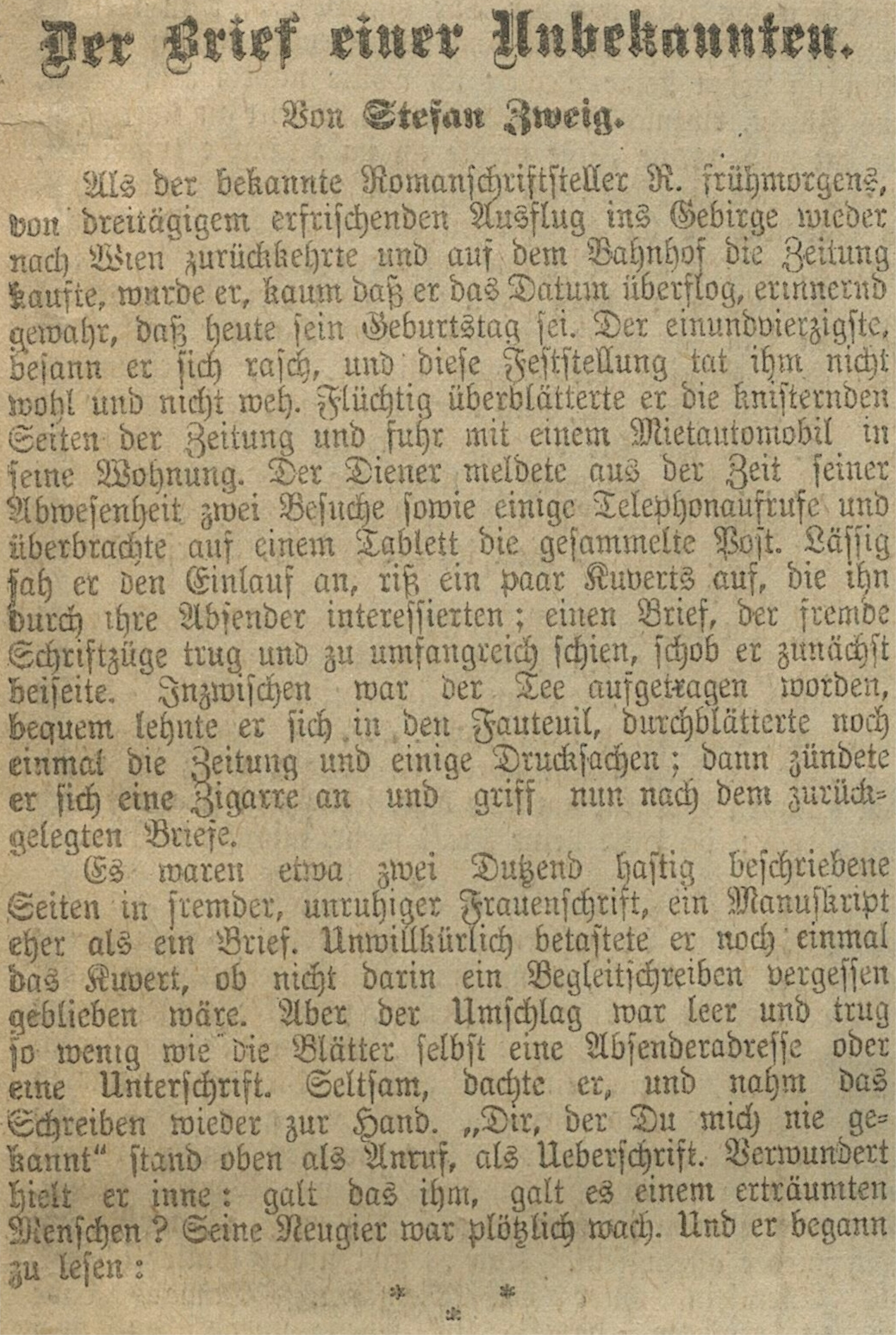
The first publication of Der Brief einer Unbekannten in the Neuen Freien Presse

Letter from an Unknown Woman (German: Der Brief einer Unbekannten, sometimes appearing without the definite article "der") is a novella by Austrian writer Stefan Zweig. The work first appeared in the 1 January 1922 issue of the Viennese Neuen Freien Presse, before being published in book form as part of the collection Amok: Novellen einer Leidenschaft (Insel Verlag, 1922). The novella tells the story of an author who, while reading a letter written by a woman he does not remember, gets glimpses into her life story. It is generally considered to be Zweig's most famous work of fiction.

== Plot ==
A rich and well-known writer (R.), returning home to Vienna from one of many holidays, finds a long letter from an unknown woman (Fräulein). As a teenager the woman had lived with her poor widowed mother in the same building and had fallen totally in love with both the opulent cultured lifestyle of her neighbour and the handsome charming man himself. Her passion for the writer was not lessened by the flow of attractive women spending the night with him, nor when she had to leave Vienna and moved to Innsbruck when her mother remarried. At age 18 she returned to Vienna, took a job and tried to meet the writer again. He did not recognise her and, without revealing her name, she succeeded in spending three nights with him before he disappeared on a long holiday. Pregnant, she lost her job and had to give birth in a refuge for the indigent. Resolved that their child should have a good life, she spent nights with or became mistress of various rich men but would never marry because her heart belonged always to the writer. Out one night with a current lover, she saw the writer in a night club and went home with him instead. To him, she was just an agreeable companion for that night, as he again did not recognise her. In the 1918 flu pandemic, the child died and she, ill herself, wrote the letter to be posted after her death.

== English translations ==
Brief einer Unbekannten has been translated into English three times: by Eden and Cedar Paul, as part of a collection entitled Passion and Pain, for Chapman and Hall in 1924; by Jill Sutcliffe, as part of a collection entitled The Royal Game and Other Stories, for Harmony Books in 1981; and by Anthea Bell for Pushkin Press.

== Adaptations ==
=== Film ===
Narkose (1929), the first adaptation, is a German expressionist silent film that was directed by Alfred Abel and written by Béla Balázs. Here the story of the female protagonist is told through a dream sequence while she is under anesthesia in a maternity ward. The film survives only in fragmentary form.

Only Yesterday, a 1933 American movie directed by John M. Stahl, was heavily inspired by Zweig's story, while not giving it the credits.

Another unofficial adaptation came out in 1943, the Finnish Valkoiset ruusut (White Roses), starring Helena Kara and Tauno Palo and directed by Hannu Leminen.

In 1948, the first official film version was produced, with a screenplay adaptation by Howard Koch. Starring Joan Fontaine, Louis Jourdan, Mady Christians and Marcel Journet, it was directed by Max Ophüls. In 1992, Letter from an Unknown Woman was selected for preservation in the United States National Film Registry by the Library of Congress as being "culturally, historically, or aesthetically significant".

In 1957, a Mexican version called Feliz Año, Amor Mío, starring Marga López and Arturo de Córdova, was released.

In 1962, an Egyptian adaptation, Ressalah min emraa maghoula, was released. It was directed by Salah Abu Seif and starred Farid al-Atrash and Lobna Abdel Aziz.

In 2001, the TV film Lettre d'une inconnue by French director Jacques Deray became the last production of this artist.

In 2004, a Chinese adaptation of the novella was made. It was directed by Xu Jinglei.

In 2011, Mongolian film director Naranbaatar made a film adaptation of the novella.

=== Opera ===
In 1975, the mono-opera Письмо незнакомки (Letter from an Unknown Woman) was composed by Antonio Spadavecchia (Антонио Спадавеккиа), and staged in the Soviet Union (and later in Russia) in Russian.

=== Theatre ===
In June 2024 a new English language play, adapted by Christopher Hampton and entitled "Visit From An Unknown Woman," premiered at the Hampstead Theatre, London.

=== Music ===
In December 2017, Canadian/Russian composer Airat Ichmouratov composed Octet in G minor, Op. 56, which was inspired by Stefan Zweig's novella "Letter from an Unknown Woman". It was commissioned and premiered by Saguenay and Lafayette String Quartets on 13 January 2018 at Fanny Bay Hall, Fanny Bay, British Columbia, Canada. In November 2018, the composer made an arrangement of the Octet for String Orchestra; this was recorded by the Belarusian State Chamber Orchestra, with Evgeny Bushkov as conductor, and was released by Chandos Records.
