= My Father and I =

- My Father and I film poster
- Directed by: Xu Jinglei
- Written by: Xu Jinglei
- Produced by: Dong Ping; Hu Xiaofeng
- Starring: Xu Jinglei; Ye Daying
- Cinematography: Gan Lu
- Edited by: Guo Wenqing; Zhai Ru
- Production companies: Beijing Dahuayi Film and Culture Co Ltd. Beijing Yinian Cultural Development Co Ltd.
- Release date: February 24, 2003
- Running time: 100 minutes
- Country: China
- Language: Mandarin

My Father and I (Chinese: 我和爸爸; pinyin: Wǒ hé Bàba) is a 2003 Mainland Chinese drama film directed by actress Xu Jinglei in her directorial debut. The film centers around a young girl, played by Xu, and her father, played by Ye Daying, following the death of her mother in an accident. It was critically well-received, winning the Best Directorial Debut Award for Xu Jinglei at the 2003 Golden Rooster Awards. Internationally, it screened at the 2003 Toronto International Film Festival.

== Plot ==
Xiao Yu, a Beijing teenager, is abruptly left without a mother following a traffic accident. Her father, Lao Yu, with whom she has had little contact, becomes her legal guardian. He is unsure how to act in this role, but as time progresses their relationship matures into an affectionate one. Lao Yu is not the most dependable of men, however. He gambles, engages in small-time black market business transactions, and spends a great deal of time at a bar associating with other men who live similar lives. This culminates finally in his arrest, and he spends some time in prison. In his absence, Xiao Yu graduates from high school and begins her university studies, and begins living with her boyfriend, a hot-tempered student from Hunan. When her father is released, he finds his relationship with his daughter strained, due in no small part to her frustrations over his absence and lack of dependability, along with his fatherly concerns about her living arrangement. She and her boyfriend leave Beijing for Shanghai, where she becomes pregnant. When her relationship with her boyfriend does not work out, she returns to Beijing to live with her father, who sees her through her pregnancy and helps her raise her child. He has not entirely mended his ways, however, and frequently sneaks out at night to gamble. On one such occasion his friends decide to play a prank, and barge in on the game pretending to be the police—the stress of the experience causes Lao Yu to suffer a stroke, rendering him incapable of caring for himself. Xiao Yu nurses him at home while caring for the baby, hoping that he will recover, but he never does.

== Cast ==
- Jinglei Xu as Jing
- Daying Ye as Jing's Father
- Kun Hu
- Wen Jiang as Policeman
- Qiu Qiu as San Mei
- Xiaoming Su as Jing's mother
- Baomo Zhang
- Yadong Zhang as Jing's Husband
- Yibai Zhang
- Yuan Zhang as Lao Kuan
