= Octet (Ichmouratov) =

Octet in G minor "Letter from an Unknown Woman"
- by Airat Ichmouratov
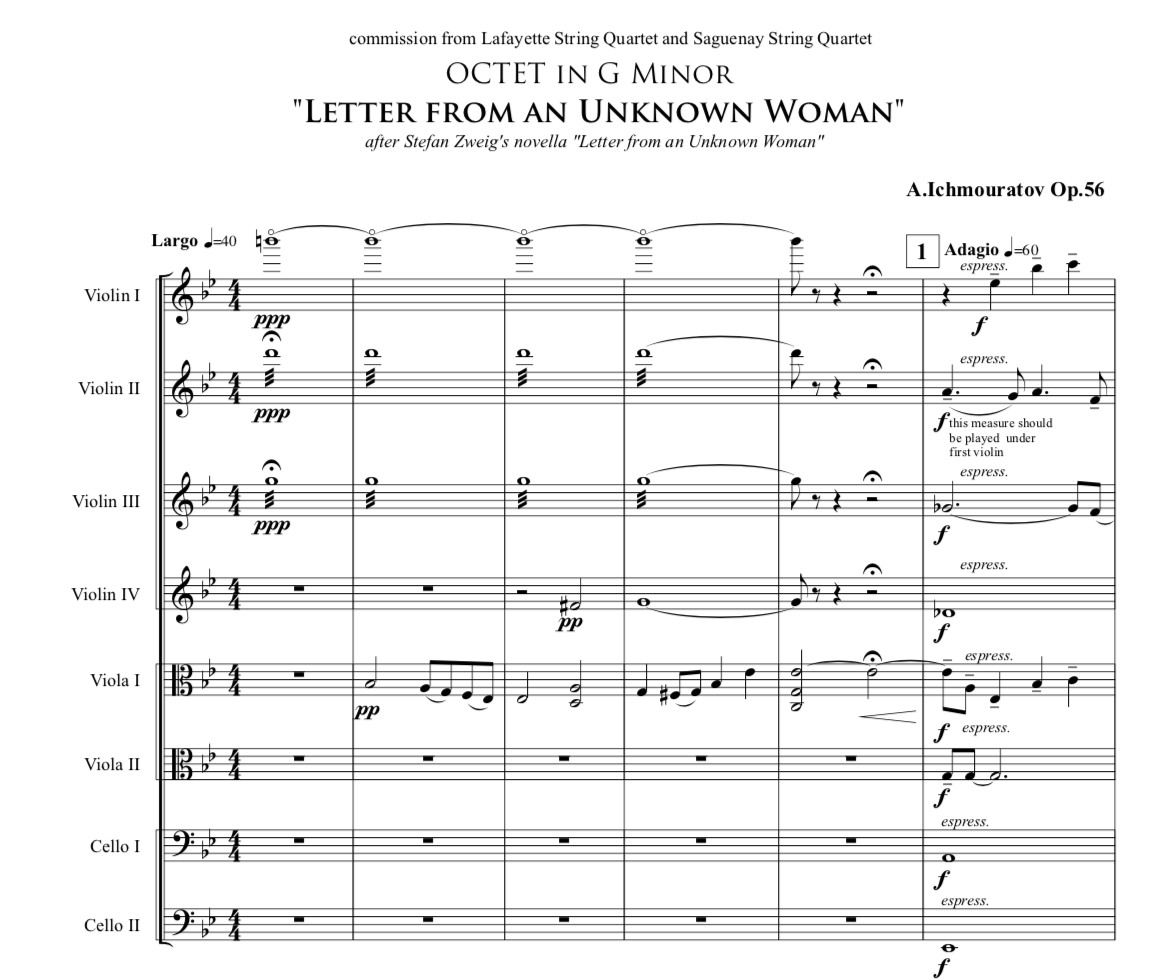
- The beginning
- Key: G minor
- Opus: 56
- Composed: 2017
- Performed: 13 January 2018
- Duration: about 18 minutes
- Movements: two, without pause
- Scoring: double string quartet

Airat Ichmouratov's Octet in G minor, Op. 56, was composed in December 2017. It was commissioned and premiered by Saguenay and Lafayette String Quartets on 13 January 2018 at Fanny Bay Hall, Fanny Bay, British Columbia, Canada. The Octet was inspired by Stefan Zweig's novella "Letter from an Unknown Woman" and bears the same name. In November 2018 composer made an arrangement of the Octet for string orchestra and it was recorded by Belarusian State Chamber Orchestra with Evgeny Bushkov as a conductor and was released by Chandos Records. The string orchestra version was first time publicly performed by the Belarusian State Chamber Orchestra with Evgeny Bushkov as a conductor on March 13, 2019, in Minsk, Belarus.

== Structure ==
The work comprises two movements which performed without pause:

1. Largo – Adagio
2. Allegro – Largo

A typical performance of the work lasts around 18 minutes.

== Instrumentation ==
The original score is for a double string quartet with four violins and pairs of violas and cellos.

The composer also transcribed the piece for string orchestra, so it is often played by full string sections using more players for each part as well as an added double bass part which usually (but not always) doubles the second cello part an octave lower.

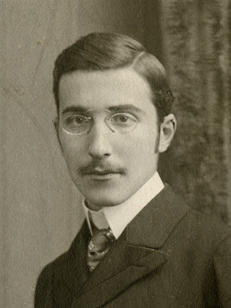
Stefan Zweig, whose novella "Brief einer Unbekannten" inspired Ichmouratov's Octet

== Critical reception ==
The recording of octet gained average-to-positive reviews. Jeremy Pound of BBC Music Magazine wrote: "Filmic, feisty, flamboyant and, admittedly, occasionally a little froth, Ichmouratov’s orchestral music is rarely dull. It benefits here from characterful performances." Carlos Maria Solare of The Strad wrote about Octet: "it is the most musically ambitious piece". Ateş Orga of ClassicalSource.com wrote: "The power of Ichmouratov's writing, his filmic way of giving G-minor a life and death born out of elegiac Tchaikovsky, Mahlerian Schubert, fin de siècle Vienna, the bleakness of wartime Shostakovich, urged me back to the original story. David Guttman of Gramophone summarizes much of its reception: "Here there is greater ability to think in paragraphs and a leaner style of melodic emoting, supplementing the usual Romantic Russians with elements recalling Korngold, Schoenberg and Strauss".
