= Letter from an Unknown Woman (1948 film) =

1948 film by Max Ophüls

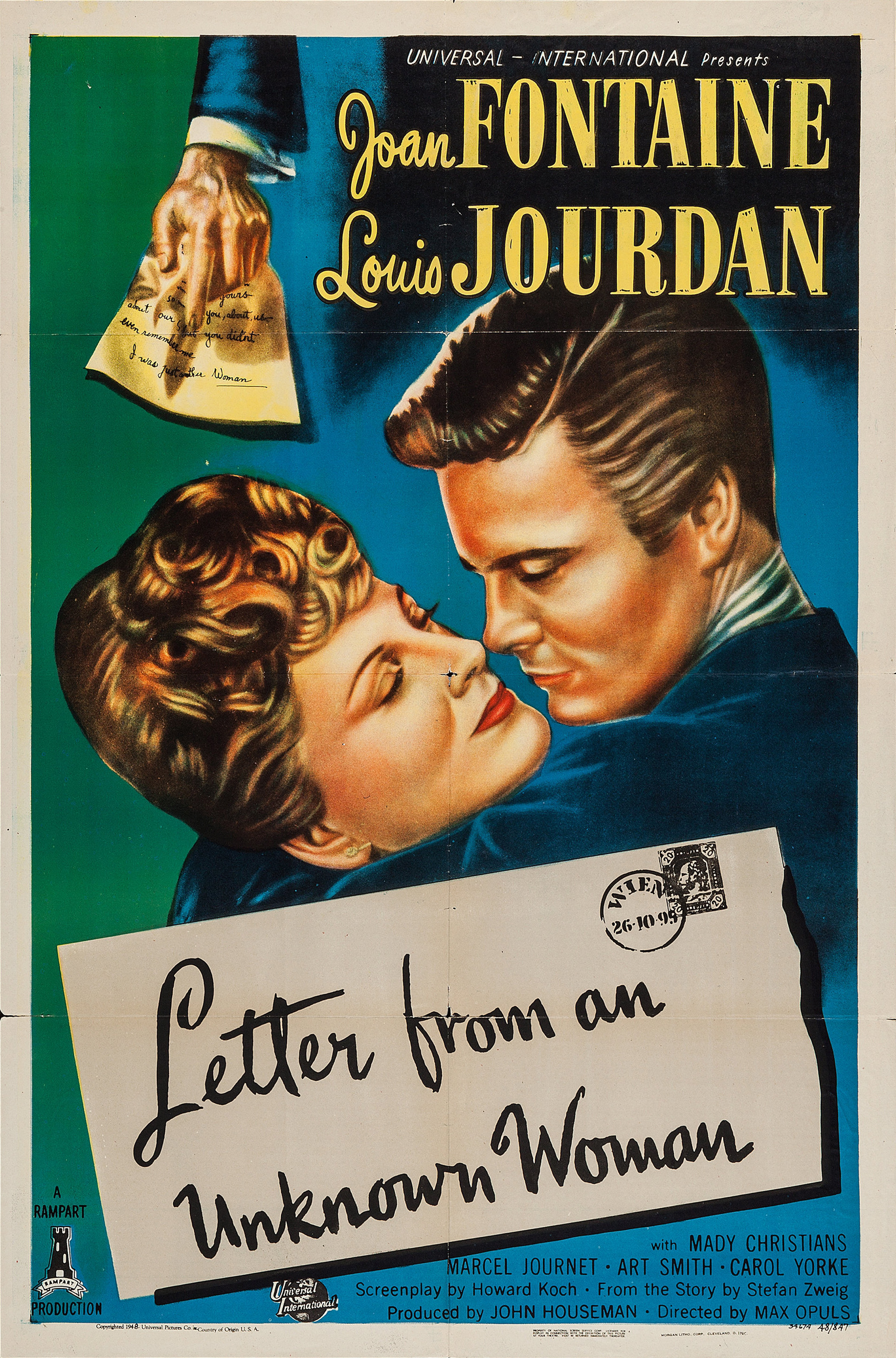
- Theatrical release poster
- Directed by: Max Ophüls
- Screenplay by: Howard Koch
- Based on: Letter from an Unknown Woman by Stefan Zweig
- Produced by: John Houseman
- Starring: Joan Fontaine; Louis Jourdan; Mady Christians
- Cinematography: Franz Planer
- Edited by: Ted J. Kent
- Music by: Daniele Amfitheatrof
- Color process: Black and white
- Production company: Rampart Productions
- Distributed by: Universal-International Pictures
- Release dates: April 28, 1948 (New York City); May 4, 1948 (Los Angeles)
- Running time: 86 minutes
- Country: United States
- Language: English

Letter from an Unknown Woman is a 1948 American romantic melodrama film released by Universal-International and directed by Max Ophüls (listed as Max Opuls in the opening credits sequence). It was based on the 1922 novella of the same name by Stefan Zweig. The film stars Joan Fontaine, Louis Jourdan, Mady Christians, and Marcel Journet.

In 1992, Letter from an Unknown Woman was selected for preservation in the United States National Film Registry by the Library of Congress as being "culturally, historically, or aesthetically significant". In July 2021, the film was shown in the Cannes Classics section at the 2021 Cannes Film Festival.

== Plot ==
Vienna about 1900 : A man named Stefan Brand returns home; he is due to duel against an opponent the next morning but plans to skip town and avoid it. His mute butler hands him a letter, addressed to him by a woman who claims that she may be dead by the time he receives it, which Stefan begins reading.

Many years earlier, Lisa, a teenager living in an apartment building, becomes infatuated by Stefan, a new tenant and concert pianist at the time. She stays up late to hear him practising, sneaks into his apartment while he is out, admires him from a distance, and seeks to dress better and act gracefully in the hope of becoming worthy of his attentions. Despite her actions, they only meet once and Stefan takes little notice of her.

One day, Lisa's mother announces her marriage to a wealthy and respectable gentleman, who lives in Linz, and tells Lisa that they will all move there. Lisa resists her mother's plans and runs away from the railway station and goes back to the apartment, where she is let in by the porter. She knocks on Stefan's door, but no one answers. She decides to wait outside for him to return. Early the next morning, Stefan returns home with another woman. After seeing the two, a distraught Lisa returns to Linz, joining her mother and new stepfather.

A short time later, Lisa is courted by a young military officer from a good family. He eventually proposes to Lisa, but she turns him down, lying that she is engaged to be married to someone else living in Vienna.

Returning to Vienna, Lisa works as a dress model, waiting outside Stefan's window every night. One night he notices her and although he does not recognize her, finds himself strangely drawn to her. They go on a long, romantic date that ends with their making love. Soon after, Stefan leaves for a concert in Milan, promising to return within two weeks, but he never does. Lisa eventually gives birth to their child, never trying to contact Stefan, wanting to be the "one woman you had known who asked you for nothing."

Ten years later, Lisa is now married to an older general named Johann who knows about her past love for Stefan, after whom she named her son. One day while at the opera, Lisa sees Stefan, who is no longer a top-billed musician and rarely performs. Feeling uneasy, she leaves during the performance. He sees her leave and follows her, meeting her while she is waiting for her carriage. Stefan explains that he can't quite place her but feels they must have met before. Lisa is still uncomfortable with this, not wanting to anger her husband, and when her carriage arrives, she is met by a clearly vexed Johann.

A few nights later and against Johann's express wishes, Lisa travels to Stefan's apartment and he is delighted to see her. Despite a seemingly illuminating conversation about Stefan's past life and his motivations for giving up music, Stefan still does not remember who Lisa really is. Distraught and realizing that Stefan never loved her despite her undying love for him, Lisa leaves. On her way out she meets the servant and the two exchange a long glance.

Sometime later, after her son dies of typhus, Lisa is taken to a hospital and is gravely ill herself. She writes a letter to Stefan explaining her life, her son, and her feelings toward Stefan; this is the letter that narrates the whole film.

Upon finishing the letter, the shocked Stefan finally recalls the three times they had met and how he failed to recall her. "Did you remember her?", he asks his butler, who nods and writes down her full name – Lisa Berndle. Still in shock, Stefan leaves his building and sees the ghostly image of a teenage Lisa open the door for him – a memory of their first encounter. He enters the carriage waiting to take him to meet his duelling opponent – Johann – and rides away.

== Cast ==
- Joan Fontaine as Lisa Berndle
- Louis Jourdan as Stefan Brand
- Mady Christians as Frau Berndle
- Marcel Journet as Johann Stauffer
- Art Smith as John, mute butler
- Carol Yorke as Marie
- Howard Freeman as Herr Kastner
- John Good as Lt. Leopold von Kaltnegger
- Leo B. Pessin as Stefan Jr
- Erskine Sanford as Porter
- Otto Waldis as Concierge
- Sonya Bryden as Frau Spitzer

=== Uncredited ===
- Betty Blythe as Frau Kohner
- Celia Lovsky as Flower Vendor
- John Elliott as Flower Vendor
- Ilka Grüning as Ticket-Taker
- Roland Varno as Stefan's Second

== Adaptation notes ==
The film was adapted from the Stefan Zweig novella by screenwriter Howard Koch. There are divergences between the film and the book. The male protagonist in the book is simply referred to (once) as 'R', and is a novelist rather than a musician. The film renames him Stefan Brand (referencing Zweig, who also lends his name to the protagonist's infant son, also unnamed in the original source material). The "unknown woman" receives no name in the book; in the film she is called Lisa Berndle (a quirk of Ophüls is having his female characters names' starting with an L). Fernand, a relative of Lisa's mother and eventual husband, is turned into the completely unrelated "Mr. Kastner", with the family moving to Linz rather than Innsbruck. John, the servant, retains his name, but in the film, he is mute.

The novel's sexual content is quite implicit, but because of censorship, the movie adaptation further dims it. In the book, the "unknown woman" spends three nights with the writer (rather than one) before his departure. She meets him only one more time, many years later, at the opera, at which she promptly loses her present lover in favor of spending a fourth night with the writer. At the conclusion of this, she is humiliated when he mistakes her for a prostitute, and rushes off, never to see him again. The movie adaptation splits these into two separate encounters (first meeting him at the opera, and then rushing off humiliated from his house), and ignores another sexual encounter.

Further divergences include a more prolonged "first encounter" between the two lovers (taking them through stagecoaches, fairs and ball rooms rather than simply cutting to the long-waited sexual encounter), revealing the disease that kills Stefan Jr. and Lisa to be typhus and ignoring Lisa's tradition of sending Brand white roses every birthday. At the start of the novel, Brand has just turned 41 (and forgotten about his birthday). This is significant because the absence of white roses confirms Lisa's death at the time of reading.

The most significant divergence is a structural change: there is no duel in the original story, nor is there a character such as Johann. The "unknown woman" from the book never marries, but lives off a series of lovers who remain unnamed and mostly unintrusive. Because of this, the protagonist's actions offend no one in particular. In the film, Brand is challenged to a duel, which he initially plans to ditch. The finale reveals the contestant to be Johann, who demands satisfaction over Lisa's affair. Having read Lisa's letter, Brand boldly accepts the duel and walks into it, his fate uncertain. This redeeming action has no literary equivalent. In fact, Brand's literary equivalent can only faintly recall Lisa after reading the letter, and there's no significant event past this.

== Reception ==
The film lost money for Universal on its initial release. (It was one of a series of "prestige" films from that studio which were financially unsuccessful, others including Secret Beyond the Door, Lost Moment, Another Part of the Forest, and Ivy.)

Bank of America repossessed the film from its producers.

Letter from an Unknown Woman is very highly regarded by today's critics. Tim Dirks of Filmsite has listed it among the 100 greatest American movies of all time, and the film holds 100% approval among 22 critics on Rotten Tomatoes.

=== Critical response ===
Bosley Crowther of The New York Times wrote in 1948: "For this handsomely put-together picture about the unrequited love of a girl for a dashing young concert pianist, based on a story by Stefan Zweig, is as obvious an onslaught on the heart-strings as that old-fashioned tear-jerker tableau, glimpsed between velvet pull-curtains and scented with scattered rose leaves."

Peter Bradshaw of The Guardian wrote in 2010: "The rerelease of Max Ophüls’s 1948 classic Letter from an Unknown Woman provides a luxurious swathe of emotion."

J. Hoberman also of The New York Times wrote in 2017: "Letter From an Unknown Woman is so beautifully self-contained that, were it not for Ophüls’s choreographed camera movement, it might have been filmed in a snow globe.

== Home media ==
Rights to the film were transferred from Universal to NTA (with Paramount being the current holder). The film first appeared on VHS tapes in 1988 under the Republic Pictures Home Video label. In 1992, it was released on laserdisc by Republic Pictures and The Criterion Collection, with the latter containing an essay by Charles Dennis.

Olive Films released the film on DVD and Blu-ray on October 16, 2012. It was re-released on Blu-ray on December 5, 2017, as a part of the Olive Signature series. This edition was limited to 3,500 pressed units and contains a new 4K video restoration, bonus features such as audio commentary, videos with interviews and analyses, and the opening Universal-International logo being restored (it was cut in previous releases), a booklet containing an essay by Molly Haskell, and optional English subtitles.
