= Emil and the Detectives (disambiguation) =

Emil and the Detectives is a 1929 novel by Erich Kästner.

Emil and the Detectives may also refer to:

- Emil and the Detectives (1931 film), a German adaptation directed by Gerhard Lamprecht
- Emil and the Detectives (1935 film), a British adaptation directed by Milton Rosmer
- Emil and the Detectives (1954 film), a West German adaptation directed by Robert A. Stemmle
- Emil and the Detectives (1964 film), an American adaptation directed by Peter Tewksbury for Walt Disney Pictures
- Emil and the Detectives (2001 film), a German adaptation directed by Franziska Buch

== See also ==
- Emiler Goenda Bahini, a 1980 Bangladeshi film directed by Badal Rahman, also based on the novel
