= Between Heaven and Earth =

Between Heaven and Earth may refer to:

- Between Heaven and Earth (novel), an 1856 novel by Otto Ludwig
- Between Heaven and Earth (1934 film), a German historical drama film
- Between Heaven and Earth (1942 film), a German historical drama film
- Between Heaven and Earth (1957 film), an East German film
- Between Heaven and Earth (1960 film), an Egyptian comedy film
- Between Heaven and Earth (1992 film), a film directed by Marion Hänsel
- Between Heaven and Earth (album), a 2003 album by Conrad Bauer, Peter Kowald, and Günter Sommer
