= Santa Barbara Vedanta Temple =

Temple in Montecito, California, United States

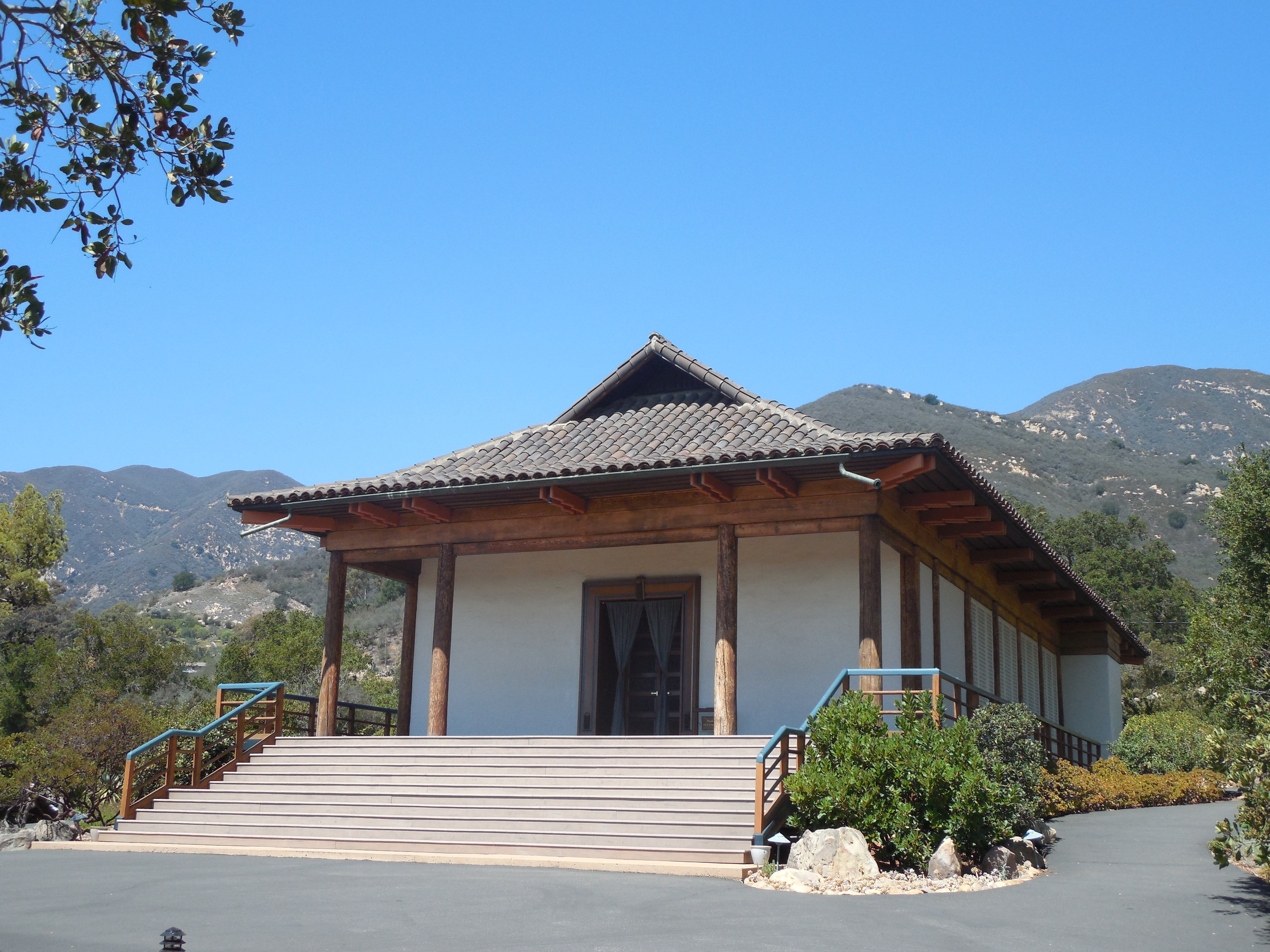
- Vedanta Temple of Santa Barbara

Religion
- Affiliation: Ramakrishna Order
- Region: Santa Barbara County

Location
- Location: 927 Ladera Lane, Montecito, California, US
- State: California
- Interactive map of Santa Barbara Vedanta Temple
- Coordinates: 34.445806°N 119.580194°W

Architecture
- Architect: Lutah Maria Riggs
- Style: Early South Indian wooden, Japanese, and Chinese architectural styles
- Completed: 1956

Website
- Vedanta Temple, Santa Barbara

The Santa Barbara Vedanta Temple, built and dedicated in 1956, is located on a 45-acre (18 ha) property situated between the foothills above the City of Santa Barbara and below the peaks of the Santa Ynez Mountains. The temple has a clear view overlooking the Pacific Ocean and the Channel Islands of California.

The Vedanta Temple is part of the Vedanta Society of Southern California (VSSC) and is a Western branch of the Ramakrishna Order of India.

== Facilities & activities ==
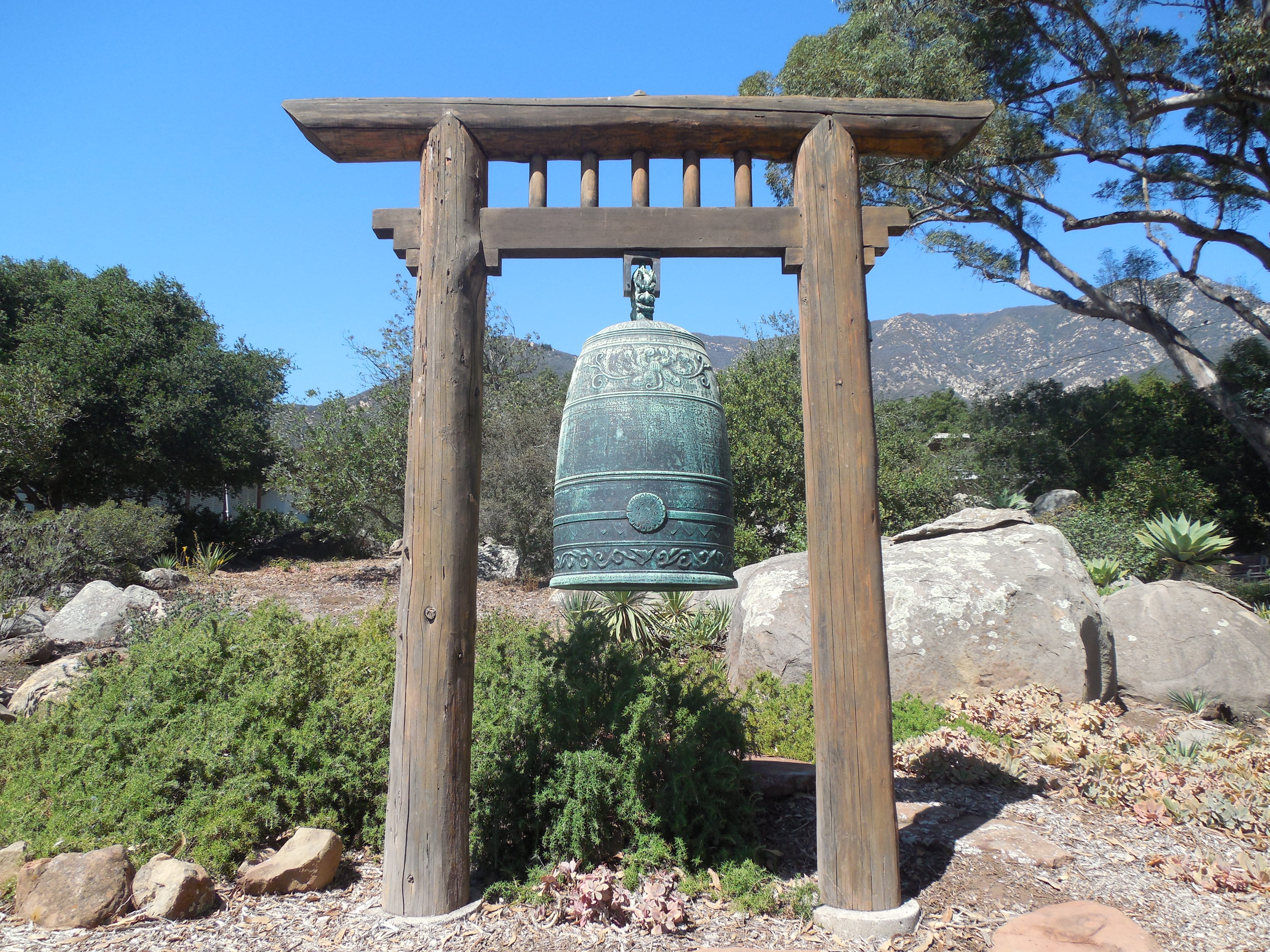
The temple bell dates approximately to the period of the Song dynasty (circa 960–1279).

Facilities adjacent to the temple include; a bookstore, a shaded sitting area for congregating after services, and a 12th-century bronze Japanese-cast temple bell (which was once fastened to a Chinese military ship) that is rung three times per day at dawn, noon, and dusk. A path behind the temple leads up a hill to a pavilion where classes are held with the swamis and the nuns.

The temple is open daily to the public. The nuns of Sarada Convent manage the bookstore, oversee maintenance of the grounds, and facilitate the temple's public activities; including daily worship (i.e. Puja), meditation, and vesper services (i.e. Arati). There are also regular Sunday lectures and pujas. Each year, the Vedanta Society celebrates Durga Puja in the Santa Barbara temple.

The inner sanctum of the temple comprises a black marble altar with carved wooden risers that is adorned above with a 45-inch (110 cm) x 50-inch (130 cm) oil on canvas painting of the Indian Paramahansa and yogi Sri Ramakrishna sitting in lotus position, painted by Trabuco Canyon Monastery monk Swami Tadatmananda in 1962. Characterized as an "artistic genius" by Swami Prabhavananda, Swami Tadatmananda also painted a standing figure of Jesus Christ holding a lamb that is placed to the right of the podium, and another standing figure painting of Gautama Buddha which was still in the process of being painted when it was installed to the left of the podium. Each painting was installed within the temple in 1965.

== History ==
The temple was built on a mostly undeveloped estate donated by linseed oil magnate Spencer Kellogg, Jr., to the Vedanta Society of Southern California in 1944. During that time, the then 30-acre property was largely covered with thick chaparral shrub, and included a house, a small shrine building, and an art room. Swami Prabhavananda (the founder of the Vedanta Society of Southern California) first met Spencer Kellogg in 1941 through Swami Nikhilananda. It has been published that Kellogg offered the property on two occasions to Swami Prabhavananda, but was turned down due to the Swami's concern for possible financial imprudence or solecism. However, he eventually changed his mind on the following account:

"But having overheard Kellogg speaking to himself about his grand plan while he swept the path near the shrine–along with an endowment of a lemon orchard–the monk decided it was indeed divinely given. 'Okay,' said Prabhavananda, 'we’ll take it.'"

— Bardach, Ann Louise, LA Yoga, 2011

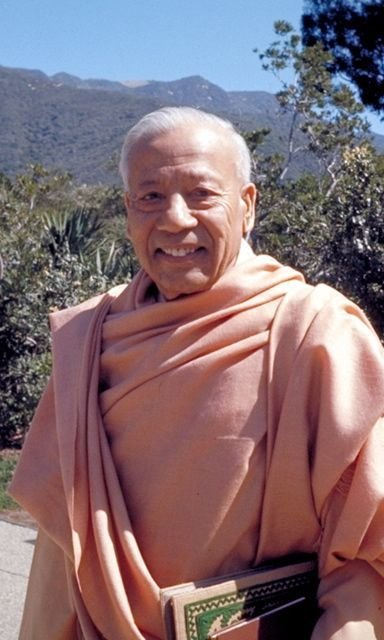
Swami Prabhavananda at the Santa Barbara Vedanta Temple in 1972.

Initially the property was used as a retreat for monks, nuns, and lay members of the Vedanta Society in Hollywood. From 1946 to 1947, a retired contractor and a group of monks constructed four bedrooms surrounding the art room. In 1947, the estate was then designated as a full-time convent for a group of nuns from the Hollywood Center. The first monastic vows were given to three of the convent members.

In 1954, the first Sunday public lectures were given in the living room of the main house, where all of the furniture had to be moved onto the porch beforehand, and the nuns' choir and organist (Brahmacharini Varada) would position themselves behind a curtain within the adjoining kitchen to sing during the service. It was soon determined that a temple was needed to accommodate some seventy regular attendees. Over the course of 1954–55, Lutah Maria Riggs was sought out and hence retained as the architect for the new temple by Ruth (Sita) Sheets. Riggs had expressed to Swami Prabhavananda that she had never been in a church that she had liked, to which the Swami responded: "I give you carte blanche to build one that you do like."

The temple was constructed and dedicated in 1956, financed in a large portion by donations to the Vedanta Society of Southern California from Italian Prince Andrea Boncampagni-Ludovisi in 1941, and from Ruth (Sita) and Harold Sheets of Montecito who gave $19,500 to the temple fund. Boncampagni-Ludovisi's original donation of $15,000 financed the acquisition of an orange grove in Whittier, California in 1941. However, fourteen years later the grove was sold by the Vedanta Society of Southern California for $45,000, which covered approximately seventy percent of the expenses to construct the new temple. After its completion, it was awarded first prize in the 1956 Santa Barbara Civic Awards as the best new civic building in the city.

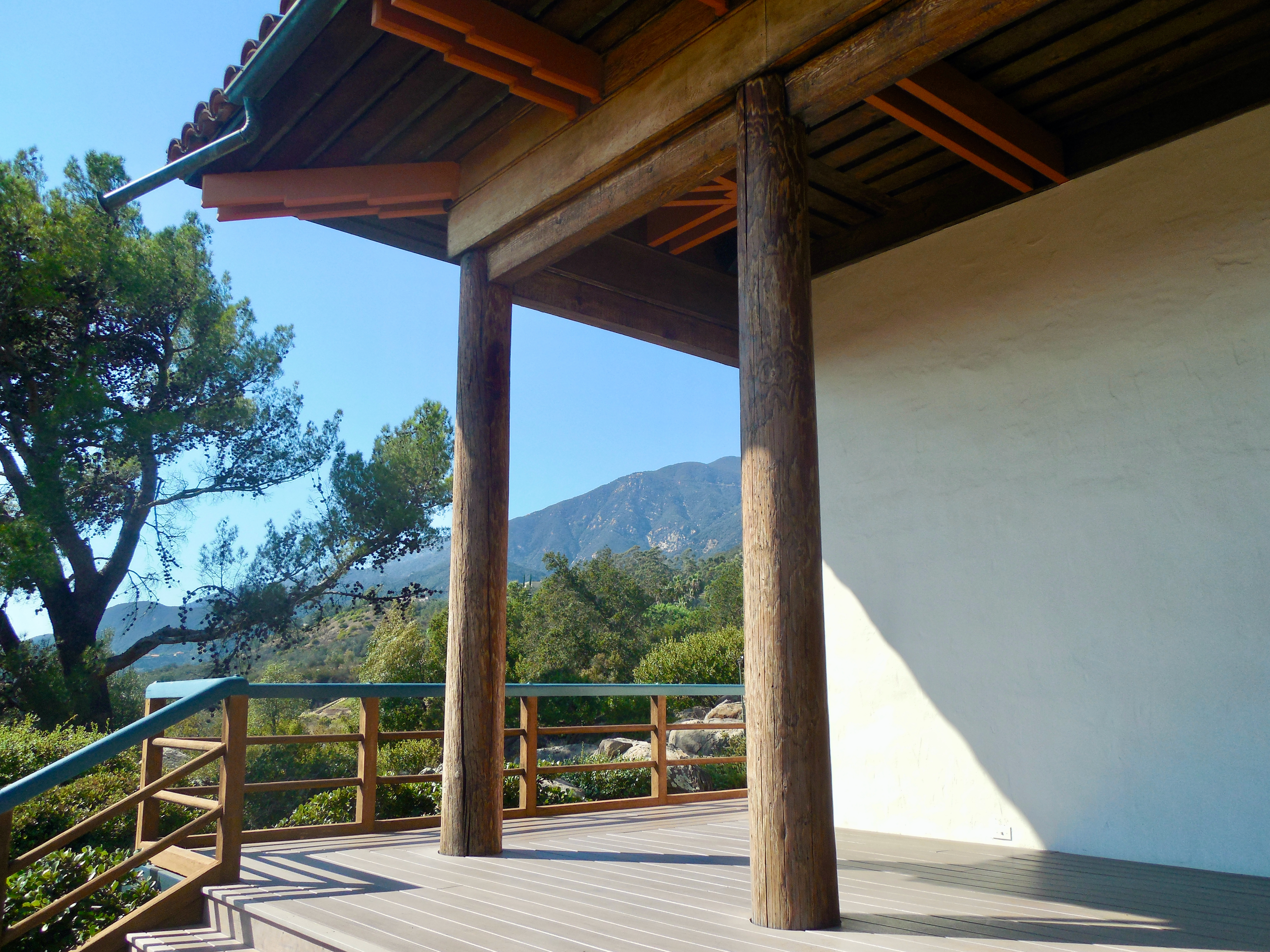
Closeup view of the exterior Douglas Fir / Oregon Pine pillars

Impressed with Riggs' character and describing her as "a real yogi" in her own particular fashion and "the embodiment of respect" from whom he had learned respect, Swami Vidyatmananda (the Vedanta Society's representative for the temple and gatehouse projects) observed her architectural drawings to be painstakingly rendered with many details drafted to full scale. Vidyatmananda further reflected that Riggs was meticulous in respecting the natural features of the site, its existing trees, as well as the physical characteristics of the materials she worked with; whether they be wood, stone, metal, fabrics, or concrete. Thus before any further work would be allowed to proceed upon the site, Vidyatmananda had to wet down the concrete foundations of the temple with a hose twice per day for four weeks to thoroughly ensure their twenty-eight day curing process; a task he felt that few builders would observe. Initially the temple's twenty-eight pillars (made from trunks of Oregon Pine trees with their bark stripped off), as well as the temple walls were finished only with an application of wax by hand utilizing a fine steel wool. However, during the finishing process a single pillar rendered a shade paler comparative to the others, and the decorator painted it to match their color. Riggs immediately spotted this artificiality and was unhappy about it, as she felt this "did violence to naturalness; it was not an authentic action". Swami Vidyatmananda indicated about Riggs that "she herself sacrificed her time and the payment normally due her for the extra time spent, in the interest of producing a better building."

In 1955, an additional twelve acres of land adjoining the temple property was granted to the Vedanta Society by Ruth (Hari Mati) Falconer; whereupon during the early 1980s, German stained-glass artist and former actress Gerda Ursula (Ambika) Zinn, a devotee of Prabhavananda, constructed a house located across the arroyo to the northwest of the temple (accessible only from Bella Vista Drive). From the 1940s through the 1970s, Ambika was known to have recorded all of Swami Prabhavananda's lectures and classes (in addition to those of the visiting swamis and guest lecturers), copying them, and donating several tape libraries to the monasteries and convents of the Vedanta Society, as well as to friends. Whilst in her late eighties, she digitized all of the tapes for the Vedanta Society Archives.

During 1955, a three-bedroom house was constructed by Lolita Hart on a three-acre parcel located at 886 Ladera Lane, across the street from the temple. Beset by physical ailments and no longer able to live by herself, Hart donated her property to the Vedanta Society of Southern California in March 1961 in exchange for a lifetime occupancy of a one-bedroom apartment at the Society's newly constructed building (located at 2000 North Ivar Street in Hollywood). The Hart house was then utilized as a retreat for devotees with rooms maintained and meals prepared by Gerda Zinn. After the enterprise failed, the house became a monastery and was used by Swami Prabhavananda for his Gospel reading classes. After Eva Herrmann (who resided in a house directly above the temple) died in 1978, the monastery was moved into her house, and the Hart house became a rental property.

The first dedication worship in the temple was performed on February 13, 1956. The following Sunday, February 19, over four-hundred devotees attended a special dedication, with the address given by Swami Madhavananda who had travelled with Swami Nirvanananda from Belur Math to attend.

“From this temple will emanate a spiritual force that will help anyone of any faith to realize God quickly. May Sri Ramakrishna bless you all! May this temple bind everyone with the tie of brotherhood and love!”

— Swami Madhavananda, Vedanta Kesari, May 1956

In 1957, Lutah Maria Riggs completed her designs for the gatehouse, a rectangular redwood and glass house constructed on wooden stilts upon a concrete platform, and crouched between the naturally surrounding boulders and eucalyptus trees. Riggs had purportedly designed the gatehouse to resemble the likeness of the temple. An open house celebration was held in August 1959.

On August 25–30, 1959, the temple became the venue for women to take the vows of sannyas for the first time in America by the Ramakrishna Order of India; where five American nuns (Prabhaprana, Saradaprana, Satyaprana, Varadaprana, and Yogaprana) took their vows, and some nine swamis attended the ceremony. On September 22, 1959, the five Pravrajikas accompanied by Swami Prabhavananda journeyed to Belur Math in West Bengal where they were known as the “Panchapranas” (the five pranas). At the math, they stayed in the guesthouse and pilgrimaged to numerous sacred sites.

In 1970, at the request of architect Lutah Maria Riggs, Daniel Donahue (an associated client) donated a large bronze soft-green patina-tarnished Chinese bell to the Santa Barbara Temple. Said to produce "deeply resonant tones", the bell is estimated to date approximately to the era of the Song dynasty (circa 960–1279).

== Notable lecturers ==
Among the many noteworthy monks and nuns who have given lectures since its establishment, such as Swami Swahananda, Pravrajika Vrajaprana, and Swami Sarvapriyananda (to name only a few from modern times); a number of renown non-monastic authors and speakers have also lectured at the temple. They include Christopher Isherwood (author of "Ramakrishna and His Disciples" and the talk "The Writer & Vedanta"), Aldous Huxley who introduced Isherwood to the Vedanta Society and lectured at the Santa Barbara and Hollywood temples from 1955 (particularly known for the talks "Knowledge and Understanding" and "Who Are We?"), and Gerald Heard who regularly lectured during the early 1950s; each person having been initiated by Swami Prabhavananda.

== Architecture ==
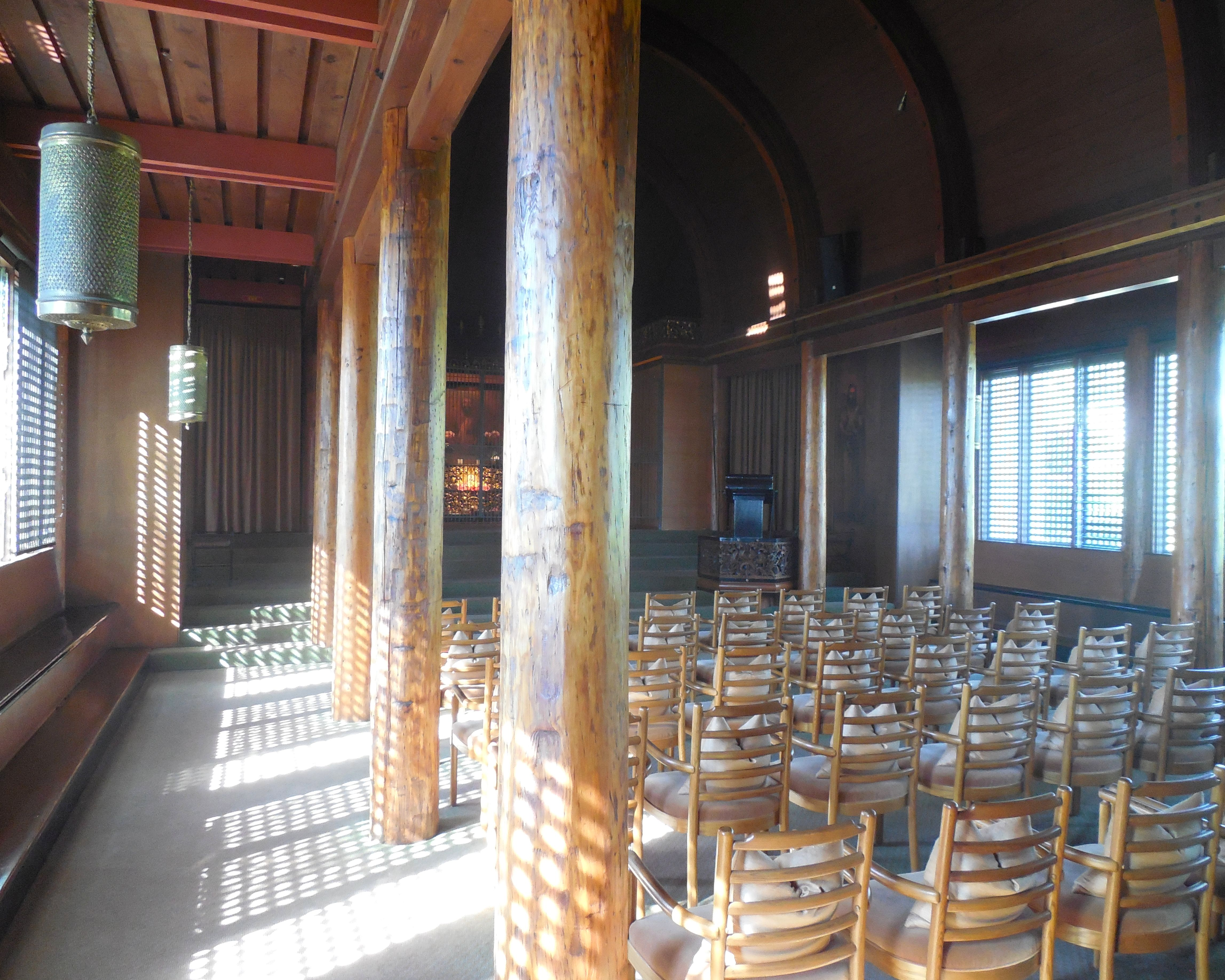
Interior view of the temple

The temple was designed by Lutah Maria Riggs, who styled the structure after the ancient wooden temples of South India, along with Japanese and Chinese architectural styles. The Vedanta Kesari initially described the temple's exterior as reminiscent of certain simple wooden buildings of Travancore, South India, where the interior reflects the Indian timber construction circa 400 BC that was later replicated in stone within the Bhaja Caves, Karli Caves, and Ajanta Caves. Here, the pillars within extend the length of the temple in rows along the two side aisles and support a series of laminated arches that create a nave, which terminates above the altar in a rectangular apse. The temple's exposed construction form and its natural materials serve as aesthetic patterning and render golden tones within the space, where outdoor lighting enters through a series of wooden latticed windows.

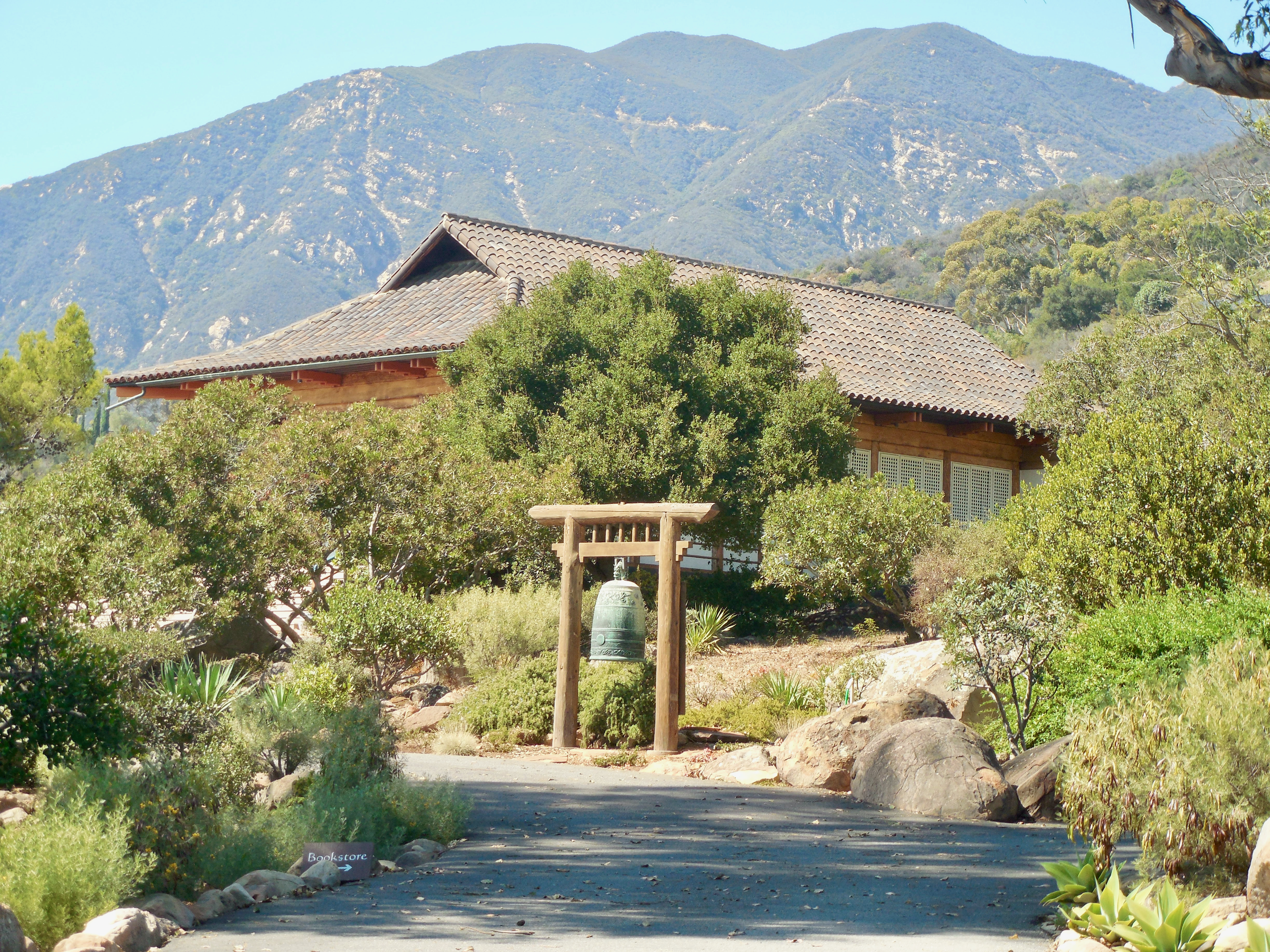
View of the temple among the native plant species from the access path

The temple's double-peaked tile roof overhangs the porch of the south-facing main entrance in a cantilever, supported by four pillars fitted to the exposed lintels. The centrally-positioned doorway is accessed by a stairway that extends across the entire width of the building to its outer white plaster walls, in which are embedded additional wooden pillars that are left partially exposed along the sides of the temple. Surrounding the temple there are rock gardens with native plant species, which were landscaped by Riggs with guidance from renown architect Frank Lloyd Wright. Riggs preserved the existing tree stock, boulders, and other natural features on the land; thereby fitting the temple in "as though it had been there always." Serving as an example to international architects, the building has received several awards for its design.

The temple has thus been described:

"Its peaked structure is supported by processions of golden-hue wood columns that were formerly telephone poles made from Oregon pine trees. They are complemented by graceful laminated arches, Indonesian carvings, brass lamps, and a broad Egyptian screen near the entry. Frank Lloyd Wright, who had met [Swami] Prabhavanada, was an early visitor and great admirer of the temple's interior design."

— Bardach, Ann Louise, LA Yoga, 2011

Riggs had also designed the temple brass lanterns (1960) and other structures on the temple grounds, including the gatehouse (1958–59, 1963, which was later converted into the Sarada Convent bookstore in 1975), a carport (1960), the pavilion (1960, 1964–65), and the Eva Herrmann house (1968–70) located on an adjoining plot just above the temple where resided the German-American painter and illustrator Eva Herrmann, and which has served as the Santa Barbara Monastery since 1979. Years later Riggs conveyed that initially she had a limited grasp of oriental architecture before delving into various literature on the topic, which included; "Japanese Houses and their Surroundings" by Edward S. Morse (published 1886), and "Impressions of Japanese Architecture" by Ralph Adams Cram (published 1905), as well as other literature on Chinese and Japanese landscape architecture, including "Gardens of China" by Osvald Sirén (published 1949) Riggs purportedly sited the temple to evince “an element of surprise, the effect of discovering a little place of worship set in a clearing in the native chaparral of the hillside.”

An architectural analysis describes the temple as a work of both traditionalism and modernism:

"The gabled, sweeping roofed temple was placed on a low-raised platform and was approached from the south by a bank of stairs. The tiled roof was projected far out from the walls and was supported by paired rafters. The vertical log posts supported the exposed lintel and roof were left partially exposed within the white plastered wall surfaces. This rhythmic effect encourages one to respond to the building as being derived from traditionalist concepts, as well as those of the modernist. As with her earlier Hispanic designs and her postwar modernist design, Riggs looked to the theme of carefully thought out simplicity to create an abstracted version of a traditional form."

— Gebhard, David, 1992

The original plans for the temple are currently housed in the Smithsonian Institution in Washington, D.C.

== Gallery ==
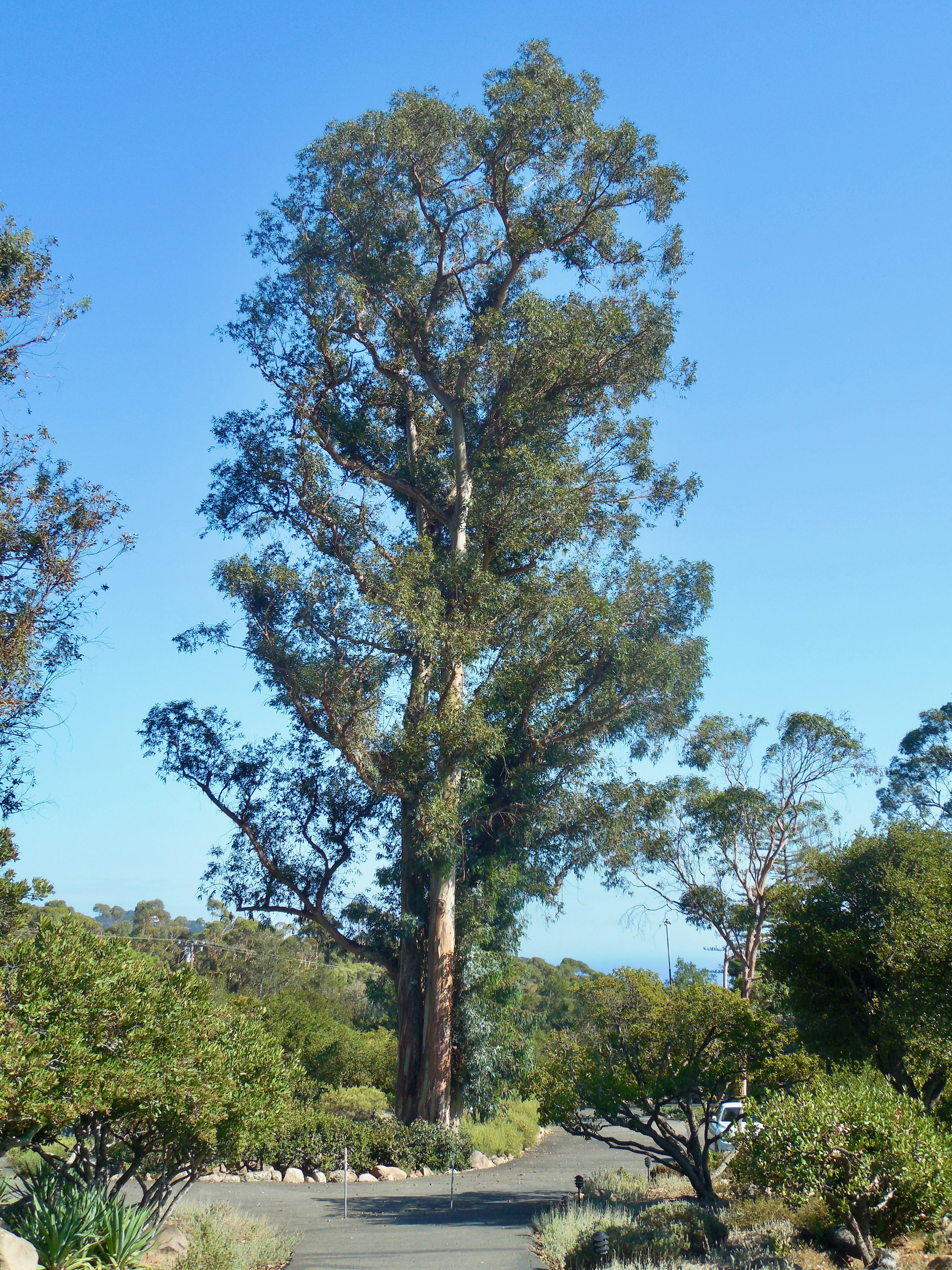
Eucalyptus Tree preserved near temple entrance

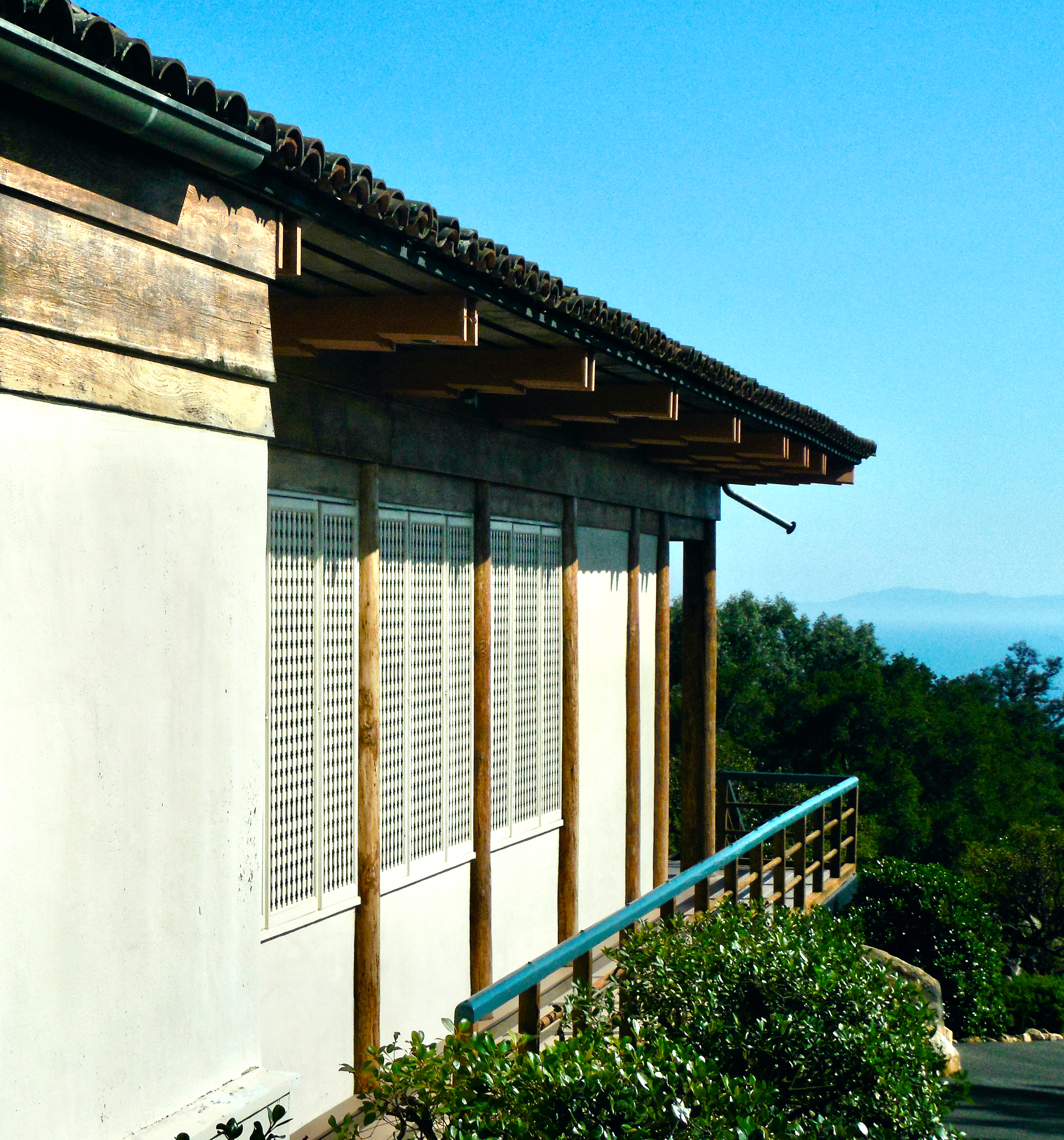
Southerly view of the Pacific Ocean and Santa Cruz Island from the temple's west side

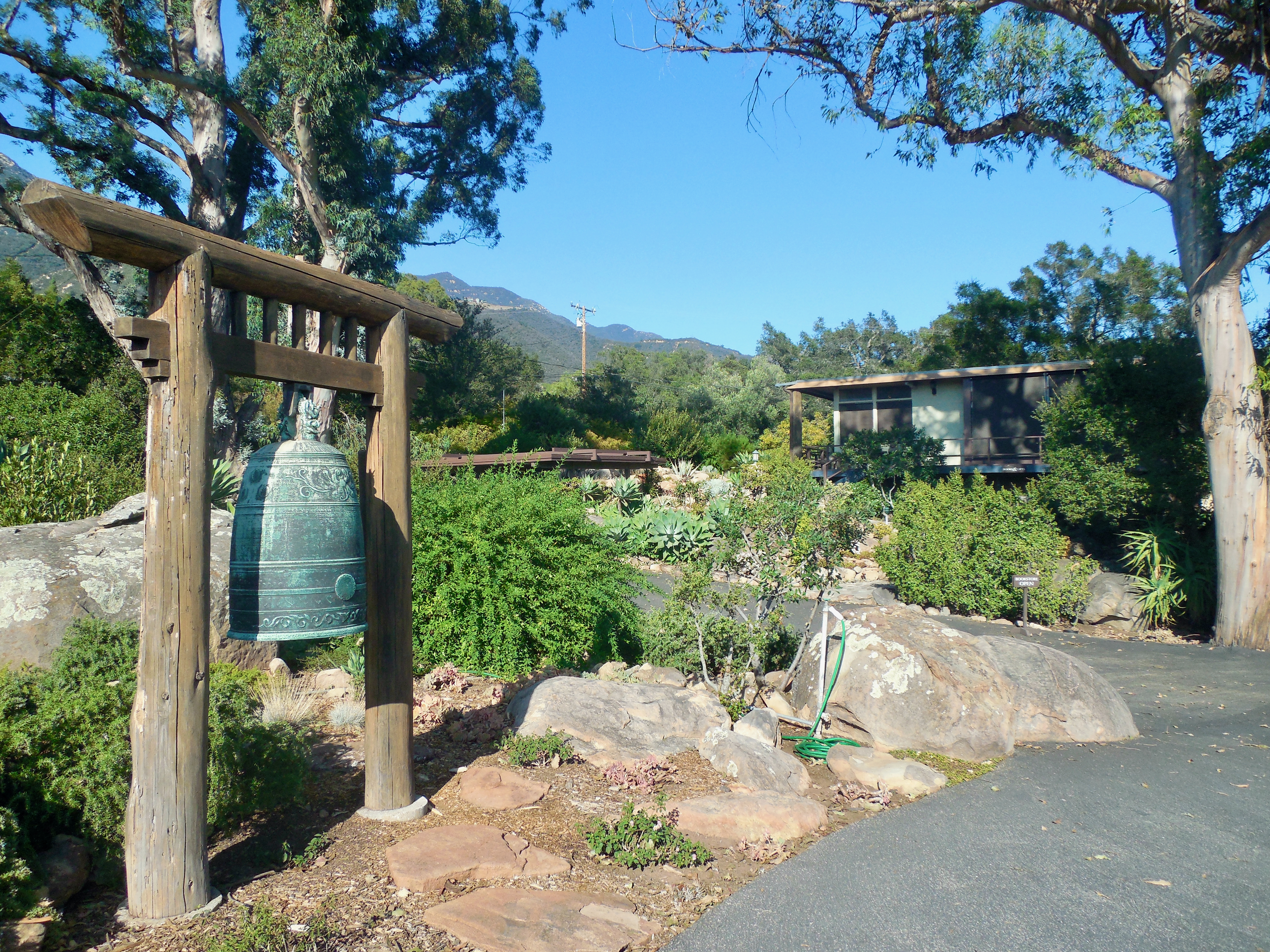
Temple bell (foreground) with the Gatehouse / Bookstore (background right)

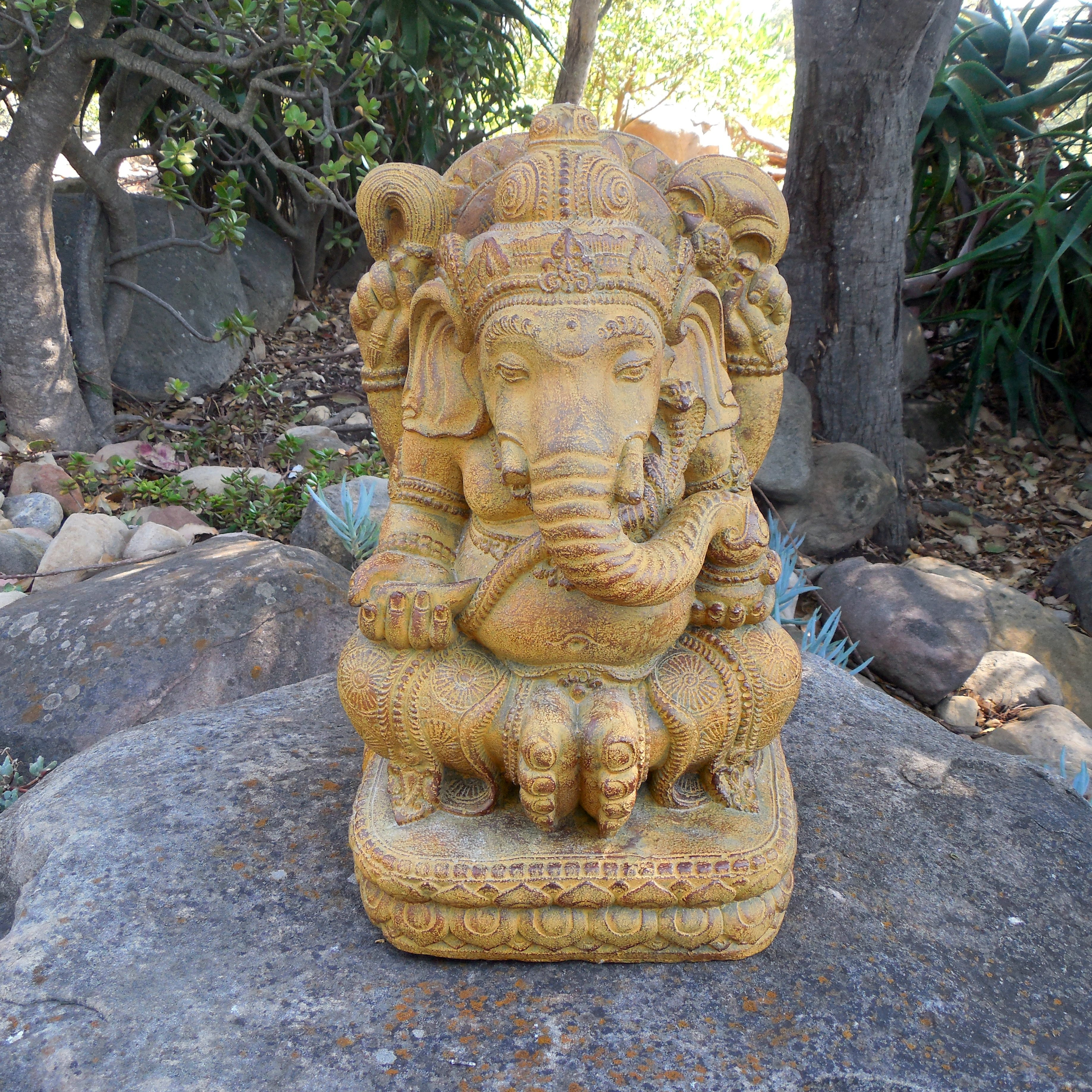
Murti of Ganesha

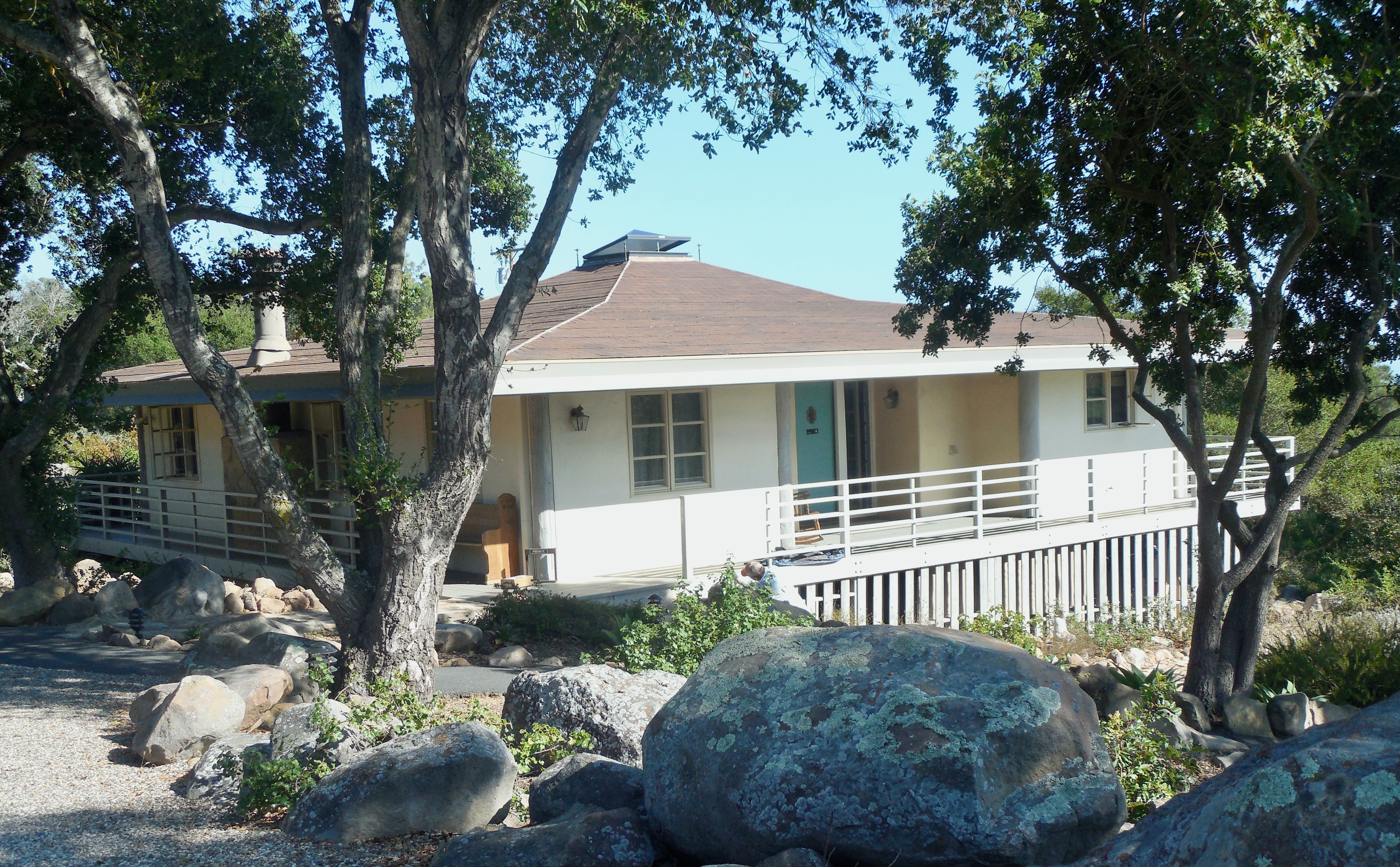
The Pavilion
