= Gerda Zinn =

German actress and voice actress

- Born: Gerda Ursula Zinn; 14 September 1913; Elberfeld, Germany
- Died: 26 February 2012 (aged 98); Santa Barbara, California
- Other name: Ambika

Gerda Ursula Zinn (September 14, 1913 - February 26, 2012) was a German film and voice actress.

== Life ==
Gerda Zinn enjoyed successes as a stage actress at the Staatsschauspiel Dresden and the Staatsoperette where she acted with Erich Ponto and Hans Helmut Dickow. Critic Alfred Kantorowicz praised Zinn's impressionism, stating that she “gave an example of the economy with which the means are supposed to be able to handle complicated roles in these pieces.”

Beginning in the 1930s, Gerda Zinn acted in film productions working with Hertha Thiele, Thea von Harbou, Johannes Riemann, and Wolfgang Staudte. Gerda also worked as a radio play and voice actor, including for the role "Miriam" in Cecil B. DeMille's production of Samson and Delilah.

In the early 1940s while working as a theater and film actress in Hamburg and Berlin, and after many of her Jewish and gay friends of the theater had already fled Germany or had vanished, her fellow-actor husband was drafted into the German Army. Zinn had stated of the time that “even the actors and actresses had to go into the re-armament business.”. She then decided to move to her suburban home in Dresden, which was later bombed into rubble during the 1945 Bombing of Dresden, trapping her and her mother underneath in her cellar for three days before being dug out and leaving Zinn with a head tremor. After a successful third attempt at escape from the occupying Soviet forces in the city, which she made by invoking her considerable personal charm along with a bribe of a bottle of vodka, Zinn subsequently found work with the Allied-occupying forces in West Berlin in the theater, film, and radio.

In 1952 after reading Jnana Yoga by Swami Vivekananda which was recommended to her by a bookstore clerk, she was put in touch with Franz Dispeker, a German-Jewish banker who had managed to evade the Nazis during the war and had later translated into German Swami Prabhavananda's book "The Eternal Companion". The following year at Dispeker's home in Switzerland, Zinn met Swami Prabhavananda who initiated her as a devotee, bestowing her with the Sanskrit name of Ambika. She soon gave up acting with the intention to emigrate to the U.S. to pursue her new spiritual path of Vedanta. Virtually broke after the war, she arrived in New York City in 1955 possessing only $100. Subsequently, making her way to Southern California, she lived for two months at the Hollywood Vedanta Society where she worked in the kitchen before being dismissed from the task by Swami Prabhavananda, according to a nun in residence at the time by the name of Anandaprana. In the late 1950s Ambika relocated to the Santa Barbara Vedanta Temple. Rather than living at the convent “because I couldn’t face living with people”, she chose to work in jobs such as waitressing to support herself.

Ambika recorded all of Swami Prabhavananda's lectures and classes in addition to those of visiting swamis, swaminis, and other guests who lectured for the Vedanta Society on a Sony cassette tape recorder, eventually amassing a collection comprising all talks spanning from the 1950s through the 1970s. She then duplicated the collection and donated copies to the Vedanta Society monasteries, convents, and her interested friends. During her late 80s, Ambika digitized all of the cassettes for the Vedanta Society Archives.

== Filmography ==
- 1932: The First Right of the Child (Das erste Recht des Kindes)
- 1937: Once I Like You (Einmal werd’ ich Dir gefallen)
- 1950: The Stairs (Die Treppe)

== Theater ==
- 1941: Nikolaus Asztalos: Die Nacht von Siebenbürgen (Widwe) – Director: Rudolf Alexander Schröder (Sächsische Staatstheater Dresden – Schauspielhaus)
- 1948: Konstantin Trenjow: Lyubov Jaworaja or Die Entscheidung (Secretary Panowa) – Director: Hans Rodenberg (House of the Culture of the Soviet Union)
- 1949: James Gow: Tiefe Wurzeln (Sue Ane Langdon) – director: Steffie Spira (Volksbühne, Berlin)

== Radio Plays ==
- 1949: Derstiefelte Kater (as Princess): Director: Robert A. Stemmle, with Aribert Wäscher, Kurt Waitzmann, NWDR.
- 1950: Drei Menschen: Director: Alice Decarli, with Alfred Balthoff, Renée Stobrawa, RIAS.
- 1950: Robert and his Brothers: Director: Hanns Korngiebel, with Alice Decarli, Paul Edwin Roth, RIAS.
- 1952: Elga: after Gerhart Hauptmann, directed by Hanns Korngiebel, with Antje Weisgerber, Walter Franck, RIAS.
