= Anna and Elizabeth =

1933 film directed by Frank Wisbar

- German film poster
- German: Anna und Elisabeth
- Directed by: Frank Wisbar
- Written by: Gina Fink; Frank Wisbar
- Produced by: Hermann Ephraim; Frank Wisbar
- Starring: Dorothea Wieck; Hertha Thiele; Mathias Wieman
- Cinematography: Franz Weihmayr
- Edited by: Alice Ludwig
- Music by: Paul Dessau
- Production company: Terra Film
- Distributed by: Terra Film
- Release date: 13 April 1933
- Running time: 74 minutes
- Country: Germany
- Language: German

Anna and Elizabeth (German: Anna und Elisabeth) is a 1933 German drama film directed by Frank Wisbar and starring Dorothea Wieck, Hertha Thiele and Mathias Wieman. The film reunited Wieck and Thiele who had starred in Mädchen in Uniform together two years earlier, "in yet another tragic story with a lesbian subtext."

The film's sets were designed by Heinrich Beisenherz and Fritz Maurischat.

== Synopsis ==
Elisabeth, a wealthy young aristocratic woman who uses a wheelchair, hears of Anna, a young peasant girl who is apparently able to work miracles, believed to be through supernatural powers. She brings the reluctant village girl to live with her, and appears to have been cured simply through her sheer belief in Anna's powers, but it is Elisabeth's own will that makes her walk, but so firm is her belief in Anna, she desires her constant companionship.

However, an attempt to demonstrate Anna's skills to the public fails, and in her despair Elisabeth throws herself off a cliff while Anna returns to her simple village life.

== Cast ==
- Dorothea Wieck as Elisabeth, Mistress of the manor von Salis
- Hertha Thiele as Anna, peasant girl
- Mathias Wieman as Mathias Testa
- Maria Wanck as Margarete, Elisabeth's sister
- Carl Balhaus as Martin
- Willy Kaiser-Heyl as pastor
- Roma Bahn as Mary Lane
- Dorothea Thiess as Anna's mother
- Carl Wery as Anna's father
- Karl Platen as village doctor
- Robert Eckert as estate neighbor
- Margarete Kestra as Helena
- Doris Thalmer as Nena
- Sybil Smolova as Schiefhals

== Lesbian theme ==
British queer theorist and film critic Richard Dyer explains:

"Ana und Elisabeth's fetid atmosphere and hysterical conclusion feels like an attempt to batten down the hatches on the emotions unleashed by Mädchen in Uniform; yet those feelings do still come through, with if anything greater intensity and ardour; Elisabeth is able to walk through her belief in Anna, they do have a transcendent communion as suggested by Anna's intuitive sense of Elisabeth's suicide — even at plot level; the strength of lesbian feelings is not denied, and the filmic treatment enhances it.

Thiele was forced to leave Germany when Adolf Hitler came into power, because of her association with gay/lesbian films.

== Reception ==
The New York Times praised the acting of Wieck, but was less impressed with that of Thiele. While admitting that the director had a natural flair for tragedy, the reviewer thought that the film was sometimes so slow-moving that it lapsed into ponderousness.

Wanda Hale from The New York Daily News wrote "Hertha Thiele's work as the victimized and unhappy Anna is as fine and restrained piece of acting this reviewer has seen in many a day, but Miss Wieck, as the susceptible and bad-mannered Elisabeth, acts more like a maniac than a physically sick person; with less thought and time on unimportant details the film would have been considerably bettered."

C. A. Lejeune of The Observer stated "this story of village life with Thiele and Wieck is a slightly erotic reversal of their relations in Mädchen in Uniform; the film is a study in hysteria, with morbid camera work, and tense direction; it's virtue is intensity, its fault the too complete departure from a normal view of life."

== See also ==
- Cinema of Germany
- List of German films of 1933–1945
- List of LGBTQ-related films of the 1930s
