= Between Heaven and Earth (1934 film) =

1934 film directed by Franz Seitz

- Directed by: Franz Seitz
- Written by: Franz Weichenmayr
- Based on: Between Heaven and Earth by Otto Ludwig
- Produced by: Theo Kasper
- Starring: Rudolf Klein-Rogge; Attila Hörbiger; Karin Hardt
- Cinematography: Franz Koch
- Edited by: Max Michel
- Music by: Toni Thoms
- Production company: Bavaria Film
- Distributed by: Bavaria Film
- Release date: 9 October 1934
- Country: Germany
- Language: German

Between Heaven and Earth (German: Zwischen Himmel und Erde) is a 1934 German historical drama film directed by Franz Seitz and starring Rudolf Klein-Rogge, Heinz Klingenberg, Attila Hörbiger and Karin Hardt. It was shot at the Bavaria Studios in Munich. The film's sets were designed by the art director Max Seefelder. It is based on the 1856 novel of the same title by Otto Ludwig which was subsequently remade as a 1942 film.

== Cast ==
- Rudolf Klein-Rogge as Der alte Nettenmaier
- Heinz Klingenberg as Karl, sein Sohn
- Attila Hörbiger as Fritz, sein Sohn
- Joe Stöckel as Valentin, Altgeselle
- Karin Hardt as Christine
- Thea Aichbichler as Witwe Brugger, ihre Großmutter
- Otto Wernicke as Motz, Schieferbruchbesitzer
- Wera Liessem as Lily, seine Tochter
- Josef Eichheim as Professor Salbermaier
- Hanns Fritz Gerhard as Feixner, der Hausherr

== Bibliography ==
- Goble, Alan. The Complete Index to Literary Sources in Film. Walter de Gruyter, 1999.
- Waldman, Harry. Nazi Films In America, 1933-1942. McFarland & Co, 2008.
