= The Eleven Schill Officers (1932 film) =

1932 film directed by Rudolf Meinert

- Directed by: Rudolf Meinert
- Starring: Friedrich Kayßler; Hertha Thiele; Heinz Klingenberg; Hans Brausewetter
- Cinematography: Eduard Hoesch; Hugo von Kaweczynski
- Edited by: Hanne Kuyt
- Music by: Karl M. May
- Production company: Märkische Film
- Distributed by: Märkische Film
- Release date: 20 August 1932
- Running time: 101 minutes
- Country: Germany
- Language: German

The Eleven Schill Officers (German: Die elf Schillschen Offiziere) is a 1932 German historical film directed by Rudolf Meinert and starring Friedrich Kayßler, Hertha Thiele, and Heinz Klingenberg. It was a remake of a 1926 silent film of the same name which had also been directed by Meinert. The film depicts the failed 1809 uprising of Prussian soldiers led by Ferdinand von Schill against the occupying French. It focuses in particular on eleven of Schill's officers, who were executed by the French at Wesel. The film was a Prussian film, part of a wider trend of German historical films made during the Weimar Era and set in the Napoleonic Era.

It was shot at the Johannisthal Studios in Berlin and on location in Stralsund on the Baltic. The film's sets were designed by the art director Heinrich Richter.

== Main cast ==
- Friedrich Kayßler as Freiherr von Trachtenberg
- Hertha Thiele as Maria von Trachtenberg
- Heinz Klingenberg as Fritz von Trachtenberg
- Hans Brausewetter as Karl Keffenbrink
- Veit Harlan as Klaus Gabain
- Camilla Spira as Magd Anna
- Ernst Stahl-Nachbaur as Hauptmann Busch
- Theodor Loos as Offizier Hans Küffer
- Carl de Vogt as Ferdinand von Schill
- Eugen Rex
- Ferdinand Hart
- Wera Liessem
- Paul Günther
- Erna Morena
- Elsa Wagner
- Bernhard Goetzke
- Hugo Flink
- Ernst Rückert
- Ludwig Trautmann
- Clemens Hasse
- Hans Halden

== Bibliography ==
- Bock, Hans-Michael; Bergfelder, Tim, eds. (2009). The Concise Cinegraph: Encyclopaedia of German Cinema. New York: Berghahn Books. ISBN 978-1-57181-655-9.
- Mustafa, Sam A. (2008). The Long Ride of Major Von Schill: A Journey Through German History and Memory. Lanham, MD: Rowman & Littlefield. ISBN 978-0-7425-5743-7.
