= S.A.-Mann Brand =

1933 German film directed by Franz Seitz

- Directed by: Franz Seitz Sr.
- Written by: Curt J. Braun; Joe Stöckel
- Produced by: Franz Seitz Sr.
- Starring: Heinz Klingenberg; Wera Liessem; Rolf Wenkhaus
- Edited by: Gottlieb Madl
- Music by: Toni Thoms
- Production company: Bavaria Film
- Release date: 14 June 1933
- Running time: 94 minutes
- Country: Germany
- Language: German

S.A.-Mann Brand (Storm Trooper Brand) is a German film made around the time that Adolf Hitler became Chancellor of Germany. It was released in mid-June 1933.

== Plot ==
The film presents the story of a truck driver, Fritz Brand, who joins the Nazi Sturmabteilung to defend Germany against communist subversion orchestrated from Moscow. He persuades his social circle of the imminent danger and the need to support Hitler in the federal election.

== Cast ==
- Heinz Klingenberg as Fritz Brand
- Wera Liessem as Anni Baumann
- Rolf Wenkhaus as Erich Lohner
- Hedda Lembach as Margaret Lohner
- Otto Wernicke as Herr Brand
- Elise Aulinger as Frau Brand
- Joe Stöckel as Anton Huber
- Helma Rückert as Genoveva Huber
- Max Weydner as Alexandr Turow
- Philipp Weichand as SA-Wirt
- Fritz Greiner as Herr Baumann
- Magda Lena as Frau Baumann
- Rudolf Frank as Neuberg
- Manfred Koempel as Pilot, himself
- Theo Kaspar as himself
- Wastl Witt as Wirt "Café Diana"
- Rudolf Kunig as Stadtrat Rolat
- Josef Eichheim as unknown

== Production ==
S.A.-Mann Brand was the first feature-length film by the Nazis to cover the SA. It was filmed in Munich by Bavaria Film under the direction of Franz Seitz Sr. and with a low budget. It was one of three propaganda films about the rise of the Nazi Party, along with Hitlerjunge Quex and Hans Westmar, made in 1933. It was written by Joe Stöckel. Over 1,600 extras were used for the film.

== Release ==
The film was approved by censors on 9 June 1933, and released on 14 June. An incident occurred at opening night at the Gloria-Palast where thousands of SA and SS members walked out at the orders of Adolf-Heinz Beckerle. Beckerle claimed that the publicity posters were created by a Polish person and ordered them removed, but the owners of Gloria-Palast refused to. It was released in the United States as A Romance of Our Day.

== Reception ==
A review in The New York Times noted favorably the film's production value and the absence of any anti-Semitic message but also expressed contempt for its unsophisticated plot. The film performed poorly even with the Nazi press as Der Angriff criticized Seitz for not having "the talent nor the competence necessary for a film of this importance".

== See also ==
- List of German films 1919-1933
- List of German films 1933-1945
- Nazism and cinema

== Works cited ==
- Waldman, Harry (2008). Nazi Films In America, 1933-1942. McFarland & Company. ISBN 9780786438617.
- Welch, David (1983). Propaganda and the German Cinema: 1933-1945. I.B. Tauris. ISBN 9781860645204.
