= Hans Joachim Schaufuß =

German actor

- Born: 28 December 1918; Hamburg, Germany
- Died: 27 October 1941 (aged 22); Oryol, Soviet Union
- Cause of death: Killed in action
- Other names: Hans Joachim Schaufuss; Hans Schaufuß
- Occupation: Actor
- Years active: 1931–1940
- Parent: Hans Hermann Schaufuß (father)

Hans Joachim Schaufuß (transliterated: Schaufuss) (28 December 1918 – 27 October 1941) was a German actor. Schaufuß began as a child actor, appearing in Emil and the Detectives (1931) and The White Demon (1932). From the mid-1930s he began to appear in more mature roles. He was killed in Oryol in the Soviet Union while serving on the Eastern Front during the Second World War.

== Biography ==
Schaufuß was the son of stage and film actor Hans Hermann Schaufuß and the older brother of actor Peter-Timm Schaufuß. Following his role in Emil and the Detectives, from the mid-1930s he began to appear in more mature film roles.

Schaufuß would be one of three young actors from Emil and the Detectives to be killed while serving in the military in World War II. Co-stars Rolf Wenkhaus would be killed in action at age 24 in January 1942 off the coast of Ireland with an aircrew that specialized in attacking Allied shipping and Hans Albrecht Löhr would be killed in action at age 21 in August 1942 on the Eastern Front.

== Selected filmography ==
- Emil and the Detectives (1931)
- The White Demon (1932)
- The Burning Secret (1933)
- The Tsarevich (1933)
- Gretel Wins First Prize (1933)
- Annette in Paradise (1934)
- Game on Board (1936)
- Stjenka Rasin (1936)
- The Beggar Student (1936)
- The Dreamer (1936)

== Bibliography ==
- Youngkin, Stephen. The Lost One: A Life of Peter Lorre. University Press of Kentucky, 2005.
