= Hertha Thiele =

German actress (1908–1984)

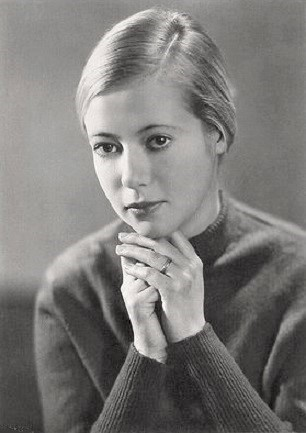
- Born: Hertha Thiele; 8 May 1908; Leipzig, German Empire
- Died: 5 August 1984 (aged 76); East Berlin, East Germany
- Occupation: actress
- Spouse: Heinz Klingenberg
- Awards: Art Prize of East Germany, National Prize of East Germany, Fatherland Service Order

Hertha Thiele (8 May 1908 – 5 August 1984) was a German actress. She is noted for her starring roles in then controversial stage plays and films produced during Germany's Weimar Republic and the early years of the Third Reich. After the post-war partition of Germany, Thiele became a television star in East Germany. She is best remembered for her portrayal of Manuela in the lesbian-themed film Mädchen in Uniform (1931).

== Career in Weimar and Nazi Germany ==
One of her early drama teachers told Thiele "Either you'll have a great stage career or nothing at all. You have a Botticelli face but one which suggests depravity". Thiele began her professional acting career in 1928 as a stage actress in Leipzig. In 1931, she was given the lead role in Gestern und heute, the film adaptation of a play she had done there, but now called Mädchen in Uniform, a tale set in a Prussian boarding school for girls. The film had an all-female cast, and Thiele played Manuela, a 14-year-old schoolgirl deeply infatuated with her teacher Fräulein von Bernburg, played by Dorothea Wieck. Mädchen in Uniform was distributed internationally and briefly made Thiele a star. She received thousands of fan letters, mostly from women.

In 1932, she starred with Ernst Busch in Bertolt Brecht's Kuhle Wampe. In 1933, Thiele had a leading role in Kleiner Mann, was nun? and reunited with Dorothea Wieck in Anna and Elizabeth, another lesbian-themed film that was banned by the Nazis soon after it opened and which she later said was the most important work of her career. She also continued to work in theatre during the early 1930s, including productions with Max Reinhardt (Harmonie, 1932) and Veit Harlan (Veronika, 1935).

Her career was thwarted when the Nazi government approached her with repeated requests to assist in the production of National Socialist propaganda. During one meeting with propaganda minister Joseph Goebbels, who advised Thiele to "familiarise" herself with National Socialism, she replied "I don't blow with the wind each time it changes directions". Although she made efforts to reach a workable understanding with Goebbels, the Nazis had come to view her work as mostly subversive, and she was excluded from the Reichstheater and Reichsfilmkammer. In 1937, she left Germany for Switzerland. It was another five years before she was able to find acting work in Bern.

== Later fame in East Germany ==
Hertha Thiele returned to East Germany after the war but was unsuccessful in her efforts to begin a theatre. She returned to Switzerland and worked as a psychiatric nursing assistant during most of the 1950s and 1960s. In 1966, Thiele again returned to the GDR, working in stage productions in Magdeburg and Leipzig. During the 1970s, she was often seen on East German television acting in sundry series and television films which were virtually unknown in West Germany, including the popular Polizeiruf 110. In 1975, Thiele's work was featured in the television documentary Das Herz auf der linken Seite and in 1983 a monograph on her life and work was published by Deutsche Kinemathek.

Thiele reportedly married more than once. One of her husbands was actor Heinz Klingenberg.

Toward the end of her life, Western feminists researching the history of Mädchen in Uniform sought her out, and she enjoyed a small measure of renewed cult celebrity before she died in 1984.

In 1998, German film historians Heide Schlüpmann and Karola Gramman noted "her acting success may well have been based upon her image which met the homo-erotic desires of both men and women, though perhaps more those of women", and that Hertha Thiele "told us she would have liked to have played a 'proper love scene' with a man, once in her life: her image, moulded by men, didn't allow her the expression of this desire".

== Filmography before 1937 ==
- Mädchen in Uniform (1931) directed by Leontine Sagan
- Kuhle Wampe (1932) written by Bertold Brecht
- Mrs. Lehmann's Daughters (1932)
- Man Without a Name (1932)
- The Eleven Schill Officers (1932)
- The First Right of the Child (1932)
- Little Man, What Now? (1933)
- Anna and Elizabeth (1933)
- Ripening Youth (1933)
- Elisabeth and the Fool (1934)

== Filmography after 1966 ==
- Geheimcode b 13 (1967)
- Der Mörder sitzt im Wembley-Stadion (1970)
- Herr Peter Squenz (1971)
- Husaren in Berlin (1971)
- Istanbul-Masche (1971)
- Lützower (1972)
- Florentiner 73 (1972)
- Reife Kirschen (1972)
- The Legend of Paul and Paula (1973)
- Neues aus der Florentiner 73 (1974)
- Die Bibliothekarin (1976)
- Hostess (1976)
- Die unverbesserliche Barbara (1977)
- Don Juan, Karl-Liebknecht-Str. 78 (1979)
- Insel im See (1980)

== East German television series ==
- Polizeiruf 110: Minuten zu spät (1972)
- Die Verschworenen (1972)
- Adam und Eva (1973)
- Der Staatsanwalt hat das Wort: ...und wenn ich nein sage? (1973)
- Polizeiruf 110: Schwarze Ladung (1976)
