= Wera Liessem =

German actress

- Born: 23 April 1913; Hamburg, Germany
- Died: 11 September 1991 (aged 78)
- Occupation: Actress
- Years active: 1932–1955

Wera Liessem (23 April 1913 – 11 September 1991) was a German actress. She appeared in thirteen films between 1932 and 1955.

== Filmography ==
Year	Title	Role	Notes
1932	The Eleven Schill Officers		
1932	Eine von uns		
1932	The First Right of the Child		
1932	Husarenliebe	Ursula Knax	
1932	Spoiling the Game		
1933	The Testament of Dr. Mabuse	Lilli	
1933	S.A.-Mann Brand	Anni Baumann	
1933	Zwei im Sonnenschein	Olly, Kunstmalerin	
1934	The Lost Valley	Lisa Amann	
1934	Between Heaven and Earth	Lily, seine Tochter	
1935	Joan of Arc	Mädchen aus dem Volk	
