= The Time with You =

1948 film

- Directed by: George Hurdalek
- Written by: George Hurdalek; Maria von der Osten-Sacken
- Produced by: Georg Richter
- Starring: Eva Ingeborg Scholz; Heinz Klingenberg; Gisela Trowe
- Cinematography: Ekkehard Kyrath
- Edited by: Rudolf Schaad
- Music by: Bernhard Eichhorn
- Production company: Camera-Filmproduktion
- Distributed by: Herzog Filmverleih
- Release date: 23 December 1948
- Running time: 100 minutes
- Country: Germany
- Language: German

The Time with You (German: Die Zeit mit dir) is a 1948 German drama film directed by George Hurdalek and starring Eva Ingeborg Scholz, Heinz Klingenberg and Gisela Trowe. It was made at the Bavaria Studios in Munich. The film's sets were designed by the art director Gerhard Ladner.

== Synopsis ==
Following the Second World War, prisoner of war Konrad Berger returns home to find that his wife has died and he has to look after his two young sons. Broken by the war years, the former construction business owner considers giving them up for adoption. However, Johanna, a displaced person working in a laundry and barely more than girl herself, offers to marry the much older man if he keeps his sons. The marriage of convenience is threatened when the milliner Hilde Streuber shows an interest in Konrad, but when she decides to emigrate to Brazil with another man, he comes to appreciate just how right Johanna is for him and his family.

== Cast ==
- Eva Ingeborg Scholz as Johanna
- Heinz Klingenberg as Konrad Berger
- Peter Bürger as Friedel, sein Kind
- Dieter Jeschke as Rolf, sein Kind
- Gisela Trowe as Hilde Streuber
- Fita Benkhoff as Frau Beckel
- Günther Lüders as Heinrich Streuber
- Paul Dahlke as Ewald
- Edith Oß as Toni
- Petra Unkel as Agathe
- Walter Janssen as Studiendirektor
- Nicolas Koline as Petroff
- Fritz Odemar as Lawyer
- Edith Schultze-Westrum as Fürsorgehelferin
- Erhard Siedel as Standesbeamter
- Isa Vermehren as Frau Hajek
- Kurt Waitzmann as Ein junger Mann

== Bibliography ==
- Bock, Hans-Michael & Bergfelder, Tim. The Concise Cinegraph: Encyclopaedia of German Cinema. Berghahn Books, 2009.
