= Emil and the Detectives =

1929 novel for children by Erich Kästner

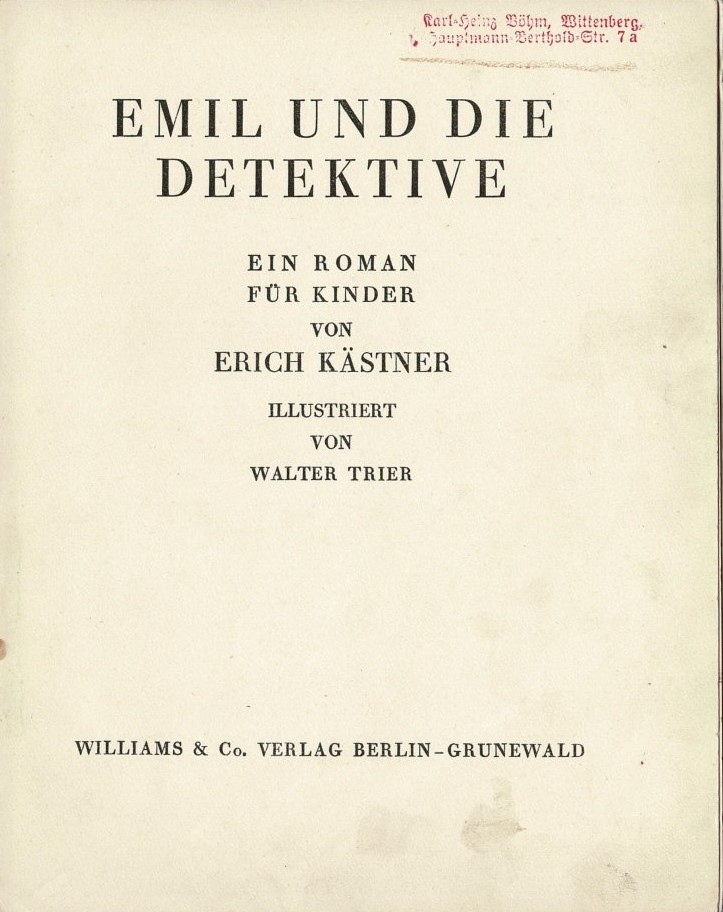
Title page of the German edition of Emil und die Detektive (1931)

Emil and the Detectives (German: Emil und die Detektive) is a 1929 novel set mainly in Berlin, by the German writer Erich Kästner and illustrated by Walter Trier. It was Kästner's first major success and the only one of his pre-1945 works to escape Nazi censorship. The book was immediately popular and the original version sold an initial two million copies. First published in English in 1930, it has never been out of print and has been translated into at least 59 languages.

It is Kästner's best-known work. Compared with children's literature of the time, its most unusual aspect was its realistic setting in a contemporary Berlin peopled with some fairly rough characters rather than a sanitized fantasy world; also that it refrained from obvious moralizing, letting the characters' deeds speak for themselves. Emil was the first name of Kästner's father.

== Plot summary ==
The story begins in a provincial German town called Neustadt, (Note: Neustadt (German for new town or new city) is the name of many towns in various parts of Germany. However, Kästner does not seem to have meant any specific real location, but rather wanted to depict an archetypal "small town" contrasting with metropolitan Berlin.) home to 12-year-old schoolboy Emil Tischbein. His father has died and his mother is raising him alone while working as a hairdresser. She sends Emil to Berlin to stay with his aunt and grandmother, bestowing on him 140 marks, a sum that has taken some months to save from her modest earnings. On the way, he is very careful not to lose the money and pins it to the lining of his jacket using a sewing needle.

On the train to Berlin, Emil shares his compartment with a mysterious man who introduces himself as Grundeis. Emil accepts some chocolate from the man and then falls asleep. When he wakes up, his money has disappeared and so has Grundeis. Emil gets off the train in a different part of Berlin from where he intended. When he spots Grundeis in the crowded station, he follows him, determined to get his money back. Emil dare not call the police because the local policeman in Neustadt has seen him paint the nose of a local monument red (so he feels that he is "a kind of criminal" himself). While Grundeis is eating his lunch in a restaurant, Emil meets a local boy called Gustav and tells him about his mission. Gustav offers to help and assembles a gang of local children who call themselves "the detectives".

After following Grundeis to a hotel and spying on him all night, Emil and the gang follow the thief to a bank, where he tries to exchange the money for smaller bills. One of the boy detectives follows him into the bank and tells the bank teller that the money is stolen. Emil goes in and tries to tell the bank teller his story. He proves that the money is his by describing the holes left by the needle he used to pin the bills to the lining of his jacket. Grundeis tries to run away, but the detectives cling onto him until a police officer arrives, alerted by Emil's cousin Pony Hütchen. Once arrested, Grundeis is found out to be a member of a gang of bank robbers.

Emil and his new friends become local heroes, and Emil receives a bounty of 1000 marks for capturing Grundeis. After everything is straightened out, Emil's grandmother says that the moral of the story is: "Never send cash – always use postal service."

== Sequel ==
In the 1935 sequel Emil and the Three Twins, Emil and the other characters have various amusing adventures on the Baltic shore, two years after the Berlin events of the original book. It is partly based on Kästner's own experience of an idyllic holiday in the same location during the summer of 1914, cut short by the outbreak of World War I, and described poignantly in his autobiography, "When I was a Little Boy".

The second book did not become as well known as the first, in large measure due to its writing being shortly followed by the rise of the Nazis to power, when publication of Kästner's books in Germany was forbidden and existing books were subject to Nazi book burnings (the first Emil book was considered too popular and too harmless, thus escaping the ban).

== Adaptations ==
The story has been filmed several times. An early German version from 1931 featured a screenplay by the young Billy Wilder, with uncredited writing work by Emeric Pressburger and starring Rolf Wenkhaus as Emil. The film proved to be a commercial success and is widely considered to be the best film adaptation. There were subsequent versions filmed in 1935 (United Kingdom, remake of 1931 film), 1954 (West Germany, again a remake of the 1931 film), 1964 (United States, produced by Walt Disney Productions), Emiler Goenda Bahini (Bangladesh, 1980) and 2001 (Germany). There was also a 1952 British television series which condensed the story into three 35-minute episodes.

Red Earth Theatre produced the first stage adaptation of Emil and the Detectives in the UK. Co-produced with MAC (Birmingham), their production toured England from September to November 2013. It was adapted and directed by Wendy Rouse and Amanda Wilde, and designed by Laura McEwen.

In December 2013, Carl Miller's adaptation opened on the main Olivier stage at London's National Theatre, in a production directed by Bijan Sheibani and designed by Bunny Christie.

Emil and the Detectives greatly helped launch the sub-genre of children's detective fiction, depicting groups of children banding together to solve mysteries and catch criminals, which in English became popular through the writings of Enid Blyton.

In February 2026, Global Constellation acquired the international sales rights for the upcoming live-action family film Emil and the Detectives.
