= Between Heaven and Earth (1942 film) =

1942 film

- German: Zwischen Himmel und Erde
- Directed by: Harald Braun
- Written by: Otto Ludwig (novel); Harald Braun; Jacob Geis
- Produced by: Erich Holder
- Starring: Werner Krauss; Gisela Uhlen; Wolfgang Lukschy
- Cinematography: Robert Baberske
- Edited by: Ursula Schmidt
- Music by: Werner Eisbrenner
- Production company: UFA
- Distributed by: UFA
- Release date: 11 June 1942
- Running time: 99 minutes
- Country: Germany
- Language: German

Between Heaven and Earth (German: Zwischen Himmel und Erde) is a 1942 German historical drama film directed by Harald Braun and starring Werner Krauss, Gisela Uhlen and Wolfgang Lukschy. It is based on the 1856 novel of the same title by Otto Ludwig which had previously been made into a 1934 film by Bavaria Film.

The film's sets were designed by the art director Walter Haag. It was shot at the Tempelhof Studios in Berlin and on location in the Rhineland. Production costs totaled more than 1,400,000 ℛ︁ℳ︁.

== Cast ==
- Werner Krauss as Justus Rottwinkel
- Gisela Uhlen as Christine Burger
- Wolfgang Lukschy as Mathias Rottwinkel
- Martin Urtel as Lonius Rottwinkel
- Charlotte Schultz as Fine Rottwinkel
- Paul Henckels as Clemens Burger
- Emil Heß as Valentin, accountant
- Armin Munch as Veit, Geselle
- Sigrid Becker as Hanne, Dienstmädchen
- Gustav Waldau as Türmer
- Hans Hermann Schaufuß as mayor
- Werner Pledath as major
- Franz Weber as teacher
- Elisabeth Flickenschildt as landlady
- Gerda Paulick as Emmi
- Helga Marold as reservist's wife
- Meta Weber as mayor's wife
- Franz Nicklisch as reservist
- Arthur Reinhardt
- Walter Schramm-Duncker
- Fritz Gerlach
- Friedrich Langhammer
- Roswitha Knopf
- Gunnar Möller
- Fritz Reiff
- Eleonore Tappert
- Fredy Walden

== Bibliography ==
- Goble, Alan. The Complete Index to Literary Sources in Film. Walter de Gruyter, 1999.
