= Hilde Wagener =

- Born: 26 September 1904; Hannover, German Empire
- Died: 26 December 1992 (aged 88); Baden bei Wien, Austria
- Other name: Brunhilde Karoline Katherine Wagener
- Occupation: Actress

Hilde Wagener (26 September 1904 – 26 December 1992) was a German-born actress who settled in Austria. Primarily a stage actress, she also appeared in several films, such as The Burning Secret (1933), generally in supporting roles.

== Selected filmography ==
- The Burning Secret (1933)
- Premiere (1937)
- Such Great Foolishness (1937)
- Happiness is the Main Thing (1941)
- Victoria in Dover (1954)
- Sissi (1955)
- Three Men in the Snow (1955)
- Ich suche Dich (1956)
- The Black Cobra (1963)

== Bibliography ==
- Goble, Alan. The Complete Index to Literary Sources in Film. Walter de Gruyter, 1999.
