= The First Right of the Child =

1932 film directed by Fritz Wendhausen

- Directed by: Fritz Wendhausen
- Written by: Thea von Harbou
- Produced by: Leo Meyer; Robert Neppach
- Starring: Hertha Thiele; Eduard Wesener; Helene Fehdmer
- Cinematography: Franz Planer
- Music by: Franz Waxman
- Production company: R.N.-Filmproduktion
- Distributed by: Deutsche Lichtspiel-Syndikat
- Release date: 22 October 1932
- Running time: 79 minutes
- Country: Germany
- Language: German

The First Right of the Child (German: Das erste Recht des Kindes) is a 1932 German drama film directed by Fritz Wendhausen and starring Hertha Thiele, Eduard Wesener and Helene Fehdmer.

The film's sets were designed by the art director Erwin Scharf.

== Synopsis ==
After becoming pregnant by her student boyfriend, a struggling secretary considers her options. These include suicide before she decides that every child has the right to be loved.

== Reviews ==
Filmwoche (1932): "It's a women's film, but all men should see it too, the urgent demand is addressed to the entire German film audience: Watch this film and help make it a winner."

== Cast ==
- Hertha Thiele as Lotte Bergmann
- Eduard Wesener as Herbert Böhme
- Helene Fehdmer as Frau Bergmann
- Erna Morena as Käthe Baumgarten - Frauenärztin
- Hermann Vallentin as Elbing
- Hedwig Schlichter as Frl. Spitz
- Lotte Stein as Frl. Müller
- Ruth Jacobsen as Frl. Lauterbach
- Traute Carlsen as Nurse
- Maria Koppenhöfer
- Emilia Unda
- Hertha von Walther
- Genia Nikolaieva
- Rotraut Richter
- Hermine Sterler
- Gerda Zinn
- Maria Forescu
- Eduard von Winterstein
- Erwin Kalser
- F.W. Schröder-Schrom
- Gerhard Bienert
- Hans Halder
- Ferdinand von Alten
- Heinrich Schroth
- Fritz Alberti
- Erich Bartels
- Else Ehser
- Margarete Faas
- Max Grünberg
- Oskar Höcker
- Georg John
- Wera Liessem
- Lotte Loebinger
- Marlise Ludwig
- Klaus Pohl
- Franz Stein
- Mathilde Sussin
- Elisabeth Wendt
- Hildegard Wolf

== Bibliography ==
- Bock, Hans-Michael; Bergfelder, Tim, eds. (2009). The Concise Cinegraph: Encyclopaedia of German Cinema. Berghahn Books. ISBN 978-1-57181-655-9.
- Grange, William (2008). Cultural Chronicle of the Weimar Republic. Scarecrow Press. ISBN 978-0-8108-5967-8.
