= The Burning Secret =

1933 film

- Directed by: Robert Siodmak
- Written by: Frederick Kohner; Alfred Polgar; Robert Siodmak
- Based on: The Burning Secret by Stefan Zweig
- Produced by: Alfred Sternau
- Starring: Alfred Abel; Hilde Wagener; Hans Joachim Schaufuß; Lucie Höflich; Willi Forst
- Cinematography: Richard Angst; Robert Baberske
- Edited by: Max Brenner
- Music by: Allan Gray
- Production company: Tonal-Film
- Distributed by: Deutsche Universal-Film
- Release date: 29 March 1933
- Running time: 92 minutes
- Countries: Austria; Germany
- Language: German

The Burning Secret (German: Brennendes Geheimnis) is a 1933 Austrian-German drama film directed by Robert Siodmak and starring Alfred Abel, Hilde Wagener and Hans Joachim Schaufuß. It was based on the 1913 novella of the same title by Stefan Zweig. It was released by the German branch of Universal Pictures. It was shot at the EFA Studios in Berlin and on location around Ascona in Switzerland. The film's sets were designed by the art director Robert A. Dietrich.

Because of its theme of adultery, the film was attacked by Joseph Goebbels, the Nazi Propaganda Minister.

== Cast ==
- Alfred Abel as Der Mann
- Hilde Wagener as Die Frau
- Hans Joachim Schaufuß as Edgar
- Lucie Höflich as Mutter der Frau
- Willi Forst as Herr von Haller, Rennfahrer
- Ernst Dumcke as Baron Tosse
- Alfred Beierle as Müller, Hoteldetektiv
- Hans Richter as Fritz, Page
- Rina Marsa as Fräulein de la Roche
- Heinz Berghaus as Hotelportier
- Lotte Stein as Frau Klappholz

== Production ==
The Burning Secret was the last film Robert Siodmak, who was Jewish, directed before the Nazi seizure of power. The film was based on the story by Stefan Zweig that was previously adapted as a silent film. The cinematography was done by Richard Angst.

== Release ==
The film was released in Berlin on 29 March 1933, but was shown without the credits for director, composer, lyricist, and original author. Joseph Goebbels attacked Siodmak as a "corrupter of the German family" in Völkischer Beobachter. Siodmak and his brother later left Germany for France and then the United States.

== Works cited ==
- Waldman, Harry (2008). Nazi Films In America, 1933-1942. McFarland & Company. ISBN 9780786438617.

== Bibliography ==
- Alpi, Deborah Lazaroff. Robert Siodmak: A Biography, with Critical Analyses of His Films Noirs and a Filmography of All His Works. McFarland, 1998.
- Hake, Sabine. Popular Cinema of the Third Reich. University of Texas Press, 2001.
- Klaus, Ulrich J. Deutsche Tonfilme: Jahrgang 1933. Klaus-Archiv, 1988.
- Reimer, Robert C. & Reimer, Carol J. The A to Z of German Cinema. Scarecrow Press, 2010.
