= Rolf Wenkhaus =

German actor

- Born: 9 September 1917; Berlin, German Empire
- Died: 31 January 1942 (aged 24) off the Bloody Foreland, County Donegal, Ireland
- Cause of death: Killed in action
- Occupation: Actor
- Years active: 1930–1933

Rolf Wenkhaus (9 September 1917 – 31 January 1942) was a German child actor who is best remembered for his role of Emil Tischbein in the 1931 film Emil and the Detectives.

== Early life ==
Born in Berlin, Germany, Rolf Wenkhaus was the son of actor Kurt Wenkhaus (1891–1965).

== Film career ==
Wenkhaus made his film debut at age 14 in 1931 as a child actor in the starring role of Emil in the Gerhard Lamprecht-directed adventure film Emil and the Detectives (German: Emil und die Detektive) for Universum Film AG. The film was based on Erich Kästner's 1929 novel of the same name, and proved to be commercially successful. He won the casting against thousands of other boys.

Emil was followed by the film comedy Spoiling the Game (1932) with Heinz Rühmann, but Wenkhaus' role in this film was only of minor nature. In 1933 he appeared in one of the Third Reich's first propaganda films S.A.-Mann Brand as Erich Lohner, a juvenile member of the Hitler Youth who selflessly sacrifices himself at film's end to save a comrade. Like many Nazi propaganda films of the period, S.A.-Mann Brand was banned from viewing for many years following World War II. S.A.-Mann Brand was his last film.

== Death ==
After the outbreak of World War II, Wenkhaus enlisted in the military. At the time of his death, aged 24, he was in the aircrew of a Focke-Wulf Fw 200 Condor, a four-engine bomber that specialised in attacks on shipping. Wenkhaus's plane, with identification code F8 MH 0093, was shot down on 31 January 1942, off the coast of Bloody Foreland in County Donegal, Ireland by HMS Genista, a British Flower-class corvette being utilised as a convoy escort vessel. The entire aircrew of six was killed. The body of the pilot, Werner Bornefeld, washed up at Bunbeg two weeks later, and was eventually reburied at a German War Cemetery at Glencree, Ireland.

Wenkhaus would be one of three young actors from Emil and the Detectives to be killed while serving in the military in World War II. Co-stars Hans Joachim Schaufuß would be killed in action at age 22 in October 1941 in Oryol and Hans Albrecht Löhr would be killed in action at age 21 in August 1942 on the Eastern Front.

== Filmography ==
Year	Title	Role	Notes
1931	Emil and the Detectives	Emil Tischbein	
1932	Spoiling the Game		
1933	S.A.-Mann Brand	Erich Lohner	(final film role)

== Bibliography ==
- John Holmstrom, The Moving Picture Boy: An International Encyclopaedia from 1895 to 1995, Norwich, Michael Russell, 1996, p. 80.
