= Vidyatmananda =

Swami Vidyatmananda (29 July 1913 – 22 March 2000) was born John Yale. He studied under Swami Prabhavananda at the Vedanta Society of Southern California and was ordained as a monk of the Ramakrishna Mission in 1964. He traveled to India and recorded his impressions in the book, A Yankee and the Swamis: A Westerner's View of the Ramakrishna Order. He also edited the journal Vedanta and the West and compiled a selection of the teachings of Swami Vivekananda in What Religion Is: In the Words of Swami Vivekananda which contains an introduction by Christopher Isherwood. He was an assistant to Swami Ritajananda at the Centre védantique Ramakrishna in Gretz, France, where he served as the center's manager until his death on March 22, 2000, at the age of 86. He edited the magazine Vedanta and the West and corresponded with many Western intellectuals including Aldous Huxley, Christopher Isherwood, Walter de la Mare, E. M. Forster, and Gerald Heard. His autobiography The Making of a Devotee reveals his spiritual evolution.

== Works ==
- Yale, John. A Yankee and the Swamis: A Westerner’s View of the Ramakrishna Order. Chennai: Sri Ramakrishna Math, 2001. https://shop.advaitaashrama.org/product/a-yankee-and-the-swamis/ https://www.vedanta.com/store/yankee_and_swamis.htm http://advaitaashrama.org/Book/Detail/835
- The Making of a Devotee, available at: http://www.vivekananda.net/PDFBooks/MakingOfDevotee.pdf
- Vivekananda in Europe, Advaita Ashrama, Mayavati, 2012, ISBN 978-8175053687.
- Photographs of Sri Ramakrishna and Sarada Devi (with Purba Sengupta), Vedanta Press, 2003.
