= Eva Herrmann =

German-American painter

Eva Herrmann (February 8, 1901 in Munich - September 7, 1978 in Santa Barbara, California) was a German-American painter, illustrator, draftsperson, and caricaturist.

== Biography ==
Eva Herrmann was born the third of five children to Frank S. Herrmann (1866–1942), an American painter with German-Jewish origins who had studied at the Munich Art Academy at the end of the 19th century, and Anna (née Schlesinger, 1875–1944), a Romanian Jew who was later murdered at Auschwitz.

In 1919 she accompanied her father to live in New York City, however returning to Europe intermittently. Although she originally wanted to become known as a painter, her artistic work also included book covers, drawings, and caricatures. During the 1920s, Alfred Stieglitz took photographic portraits of Herrmann, which are today part of the Getty Museum collection. Her breakthrough as an artist occurred in 1929 with the release of On Parade: Caricatures by Eva Hermann. During this period she became acquainted with Klaus and Erika Mann, and their friend, artist Ricki Hallgarten.

Between 1932 and 1939 Herrmann traveled extensively throughout Europe to portray the most famous faces of the day, including those of George Bernard Shaw, Aldous Huxley, and Bertolt Brecht whose portraits were then sent to their respective editorial offices within the United States. From 1933 onward (while not travelling), Herrmann frequently stayed in Sanary-sur-Mer with the exiled Mann family and maintained close friendships with a circle of local emigrants, including writer Sybille Bedford. Commissioned by the publishing house Querido in Amsterdam, she developed cover designs for the German, Russian, and English editions of Lion Feuchtwanger's novel Exil in 1939.

Herrmann moved to Hollywood in the 1940s, again living among the local emigrant community. During this period, her caricatures were stylistically characterized by clear lines and austerity. Subsequently, moving to Santa Barbara, Eva Herrmann's house became a meeting locale for a number of exiled German writers.
