= Emil and the Detectives (1931 film) =

1931 film

- Film poster
- Directed by: Gerhard Lamprecht
- Written by: Billy Wilder; Erich Kästner; Emeric Pressburger
- Produced by: Günther Stapenhorst
- Starring: Rolf Wenkhaus; Fritz Rasp
- Cinematography: Werner Brandes
- Music by: Allan Gray
- Distributed by: UFA
- Release date: 2 December 1931
- Running time: 75 minutes
- Country: Weimar Republic
- Language: German

Emil and the Detectives (German: Emil und die Detektive) is a 1931 German adventure film directed by Gerhard Lamprecht and starring Rolf Wenkhaus. It is based on the 1929 novel by Erich Kästner, who also contributed to the film's script. The film script was written by Billy Wilder. It is generally considered to be the best film adaption of Emil and the Detectives.

== Plot ==
Set in Germany during the Weimar Republic, the film begins in the small provincial town of Neustadt, the home to schoolboy Emil Tischbein. His father is dead and his hairdresser mother raises him alone. She sends him to Berlin with 140 marks (equivalent to her monthly income) to give to his grandmother who lives with his young female cousin, Pony Hütchen. He also gets 20 marks for himself.

On the train, Emil meets a sinister man who introduces himself as Herr Grundeis. Emil, suspicious, goes to the toilet and uses a pin to secure the three banknotes inside his jacket lining. Grundeis offers Emil a sweet, but it is drugged: Emil starts hallucinating and falls asleep. When he wakes up at the station in Berlin, Grundeis and the money are gone. However, he spots Grundeis at the exit and follows him. Emil dares not call the police, because he had played a prank by dressing up a monument to imitate a local official, so feels that he is "a kind of criminal" himself. However, he meets a local boy named Gustav who offers to help him and assembles other children who call themselves "the detectives" to help.

After following Grundeis to a hotel and spying on him all night, Emil and the gang chase him into a bank. When Grundeis tries to exchange the notes, Emil accuses him of theft, proving that the money is his by mentioning the holes left in the bills by the pin he used to secure them to his lining. Grundeis tries to flee, but Emil's gang of new friends hold on to him until the police arrive. Once arrested, Grundeis is discovered to be a wanted bank robber and Emil receives a reward of 1000 marks. The film ends with a private plane taking Emil back to Neustadt, where he is greeted as a local hero with speeches and a band.

== Cast ==
- Rolf Wenkhaus as Emil Tischbein
- Fritz Rasp as Grundeis the thief
- Käthe Haack as Frau Tischbein
- Olga Engl as Grossmama Tischbein
- Rudolf Biebrach as Wachtmeister Jeschke
- Inge Landgut as Pony Hütchen
- Hans Joachim Schaufuß as Gustav mit der Hupe
- Hans Richter as Fliegender Hirsch
- Hans Albrecht Löhr as Kleiner Dienstag
- Hubert Schmitz as the Professor
- Ernst-Eberhard Reling as Gerold
- Waldemar Kupczyk as Mittenzwei
- Martin Rickelt as Max, real lobby boy
- Gerhard Dammann as the fat old train passenger
- Rudolf Lettinger as the Chief of Police
- Margarete Sachse as Frau Tischbein's customer
- Georg H. Schnell as the Bank teller

== Reception ==
The film was a critical and commercial success and also became popular with international audiences. It launched the career of Billy Wilder as a screenwriter. Mordaunt Hall wrote in his New York Times review in 1931: "It is a pity that the audience that welcomed Emil und die Detektive, a German-language children's film, to the Ufa-Cosmopolitan yesterday afternoon did not have the chance to meet the youthful actors in the flesh, as happened when this delightful picture had its première at the Kurfürstendamm Theatre in Berlin several weeks ago. For every one would have enjoyed seeing these clever boys, who furnish eloquent proof that Hollywood has no monopoly on juvenile screen talent. And Inge Landgut, the solitary girl in a leading rôle, is up to the high standard set by her colleagues, although a little mature for her part. Those who may imagine that American boys have exclusive rights on Indians," "Cops and Robbers," et al., will discover that such isn't the case and will settle down to enjoy the interesting and rapid development of a tale beginning with Emil (Rolf Wenkhaus) and two companions throwing dice to see who shall "remodel" a statue in Neustadt in defiance of the police and winding up with his return from Berlin in an airplane, hailed as the hero who has effected the arrest of a notorious bank robber. There are many good scenes and the photography and sound recording are excellent."

In a list of the 100 most important German films, compiled in 1994 by the Association of German Cinémathèques, Emil and the Detectives was placed at #78. British film critic Philip French from the Guardian wrote in 2013: "It's a lively, funny, exciting tale of a country mouse collaborating with streetwise city kids, and it creates a splendid picture of bustling life in the capital [sic] of Weimar Germany. One can now see its influence on two major British movies: The Lady Vanishes (1938) copies the hallucinatory sequence on a train that follows the villain giving Emil a drugged sweet, and Hue and Cry (1947) borrows the notion of smart, organised schoolkids chasing a criminal in the big city."

== Remakes ==
There are several film adaptions of Emil and the Detectives. The British 1935 film and the German 1954 film are direct remakes of this 1931 film, using most of Wilder's screenplay and (in the case of the 1935 film) even recreating many of the same camera shots.

== Miscellaneous ==
Most of the main male child actors died during World War II.
