= Heinz Klingenberg (actor) =

German actor

Heinz Klingenberg (6 April 1905, Bielefeld – 12 September 1959, Schweinfurt) was a German film and television actor.

== Filmography ==
Year	Title	Role	Notes
1932	The Eleven Schill Officers	Bankier Stegerwald	
1932	Queen of Atlantis	Lt. Saint-Avit	
1932	Mrs. Lehmann's Daughters	Fritz von Trachtenberg	
1932	Theodor Körner	Friesen	
1933	S.A.-Mann Brand	Fritz Brand	
1933	Gretel Wins First Prize		
1934	Between Heaven and Earth	Karl, sein Sohn	
1943	The Big Number	Dr. Buchner	
1944	The Degenhardts		
1948	The Time with You	Konrad Berger	
1949	Second Hand Destiny	Dr. Beringe	
1950	The Shadow of Herr Monitor	Prosecutor	
1951	Das gestohlene Jahr	Lehrer Brandl	
1953	The Stronger Woman	Fürst von Hartefeld-Rosenau	
1956	The Marriage of Doctor Danwitz	Dr. Frank	
1956	Magic Fire	King of Saxonia	
1957	Es wird alles wieder gut		
1958	Doctor Crippen Lives		
