= Emil and the Detectives (1964 film) =

1964 film by Peter Tewksbury

- Theatrical release poster
- Directed by: Peter Tewksbury
- Screenplay by: A.J. Carothers
- Based on: Emil and the Detectives by Erich Kästner
- Produced by: Walt Disney
- Starring: Walter Slezak; Bryan Russell; Roger Mobley; Cindy Cassell
- Cinematography: Günther Senftleben
- Edited by: Thomas Stanford
- Music by: Heinz Schreiter
- Production company: Walt Disney Productions
- Distributed by: Buena Vista Distribution
- Release date: December 18, 1964
- Running time: 99 minutes
- Countries: United States; West Germany
- Language: English
- Box office: $1,275,000

Emil and the Detectives is a 1964 American-West-German crime comedy film directed by Peter Tewksbury based on the novel Emil and the Detectives by German author Erich Kästner. The film stars Walter Slezak and Bryan Russell.

It was shot at the Tempelhof Studios in Berlin and on location around the city. The sets were designed by the art directors Isabella and Werner Schlichting.

== Plot ==
Ten-year old Emil Tischbein travels by bus from Neustadt to Berlin, carrying an envelope containing 400 marks that his mother has entrusted him to deliver to his grandmother. Emil falls asleep during the bus ride and wakes up to find the money gone. He is sure that the thief is Grundeis, the shifty man who was sitting next to him. Emil follows Grundeis to a Berlin cafe and summons a policeman, but Grundeis escapes to a rendezvous with The Baron, his underworld associate. Emil enlists the help of a group of child "detectives" led by the street urchin Gustav, and together they track down Grundeis and overhear him plotting with The Baron and his accomplice Müller to rob a large Berlin bank by tunneling into its vault. Emil is captured and forced to assist in the criminal plot. After the bank vault is blown open, Grundeis is double-crossed by The Baron and Müller, and left behind with Emil in the tunnel to be blown up by a dynamite fuse - but Gustav arrives in time to save them. The child detectives pursue the thieves and alert more children in the neighborhood, who also give chase. The Baron and Müller are surrounded by the children and arrested by the police. Emil receives a reward, which he intends to share with the other children.

== Cast ==
- Walter Slezak as The Baron
- Bryan Russell as Emil Tischbein
- Roger Mobley as Gustav
- Cindy Cassell as Pony
- Heinz Schubert as Grundeis the thief
- Peter Ehrlich as Müller
- Elsa Wagner as Grandma
- Eva Ingeborg Scholz as Frau Tischbein, Emil's mother
- Wolfgang Völz as Wachtmeister Stucke
- Brian Richardson as The Professor
- Robert Swann as Hermann
- David Petrychka as Dienstag

== Reception ==
Eugene Archer of The New York Times wrote that "Walt Disney has come up with one of his best children's pictures", stating that Tewksbury's direction "makes all the difference. He has kept the kiddies from gushing too coyly, suppressed the mugging of a comic trio of thieves, photographed the fresh Berlin setting in effective color, and juxtaposed suspense and wit with a nice, bouncing pace." Variety called the film "an interesting project" with "the customary distinguishable Disney mark to give it class", but without the same appeal to adults as "say, Disney's previous moppet classic, 'Mary Poppins'". Philip K. Scheuer of the Los Angeles Times wrote that the film "falls somewhere between the moppet trade and not-too-discriminating adults". The Monthly Film Bulletin found it "pleasantly presented, if without any distinction".

== Comic book adaption ==
- Gold Key: Emil and the Detectives (February 1965)
