= Between Heaven and Earth (novel) =

1856 novel by Otto Ludwig

- Author: Otto Ludwig
- Original title: Zwischen Himmel und Erde
- Language: German
- Publisher: Meidinger Sohn und Comp.
- Publication date: 1856
- Publication place: Frankfurt
- Pages: 320

Between Heaven and Earth (German: Zwischen Himmel und Erde) is an 1856 novel by the German writer Otto Ludwig. It follows two brothers in a complicated love triangle. The novel's theme was inspired by the story of Cain and Abel.

Ludwig wrote the novel in Dresden in the summer and autumn of 1855. It was intended for serialisation in the magazine Die Gartenlaube, but this plan was cancelled. It was first published by Meidinger in Frankfurt in 1856.

The novel was the basis for the 1923 film Brüder directed by Rochus Gliese, the 1934 film Between Heaven and Earth directed by Franz Seitz and the 1942 film Between Heaven and Earth directed by Harald Braun.
