= Emil and the Detectives (1954 film) =

1954 film directed by Robert A. Stemmle

- Directed by: Robert A. Stemmle
- Written by: Erich Kästner (novel); Billy Wilder (1931 screenplay); Robert A. Stemmle
- Produced by: Kurt Ulrich
- Starring: Heli Finkenzeller; Wolfgang Lukschy; Kurt Meisel
- Cinematography: Kurt Schulz
- Edited by: Hermann Leitner
- Music by: Georg Haentzschel
- Production company: Berolina Film
- Distributed by: Herzog Film
- Release date: October 14, 1954
- Running time: 90 minutes
- Country: West Germany
- Language: German

Emil and the Detectives (German: Emil und die Detektive) is a 1954 West German family adventure film directed by Robert A. Stemmle and starring Heli Finkenzeller, Wolfgang Lukschy and Kurt Meisel.It is a remake of the 1931 film of the same name which was based on a 1929 novel by Erich Kästner. Unlike the earlier version which was set during the Great Depression, this film was made with Eastmancolor and portrays West Berlin during the economic miracle. It was shot at the Tempelhof Studios in West Berlin and on location across the city. The film's sets were designed by the art directors Willi Herrmann and Heinrich Weidemann.

== Cast ==
- Peter Finkbeiner as Emil Tischbein - der Sohn
- Heli Finkenzeller as Seine Mutter Anna Tischbein
- Wolfgang Lukschy as Oberwachtmeister Jeschke
- Kurt Meisel as Herr Grundeis
- Ruth Nimbach as Anni Wandel
- Claudia Schäfer as Pony Hütchen - Emils Cousine
- Margarete Haagen as Die Grossmutter
- Camilla Spira as Emils Tante Martha Heimbold
- Hans Dieter Zeidler as Emils Onkel
- Lothar Scholz as Hotelpage
- Walter Gross as Ein Strassenbahnschaffner
- Ernst Waldow as Der Kurgast
- Gerd Frickhöffer as Der Festredner
- Marina Ried as Seine Frau
- Else Reval as Frau Wirth
- Jakob Tiedtke as Der Rektor
- Axel Monjé as Der Herr vom Kriminalamt
- Wolfgang Condrus as Gustav mit der Hupe
- Wolf-Eberhard Grasshoff as Der Professor
- Roland Kaiser as Der kleine Dienstag
- Hannes Hübner as Des fliegende Hirsch

== Bibliography ==
- Hake, Sabine. German National Cinema. Routledge, 2002.
