= Otto Ludwig (writer) =

German dramatist, novelist and critic (1813–1865)

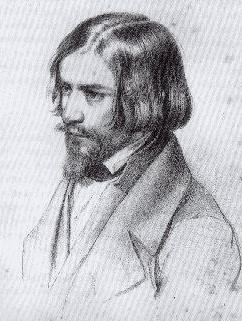
Otto Ludwig

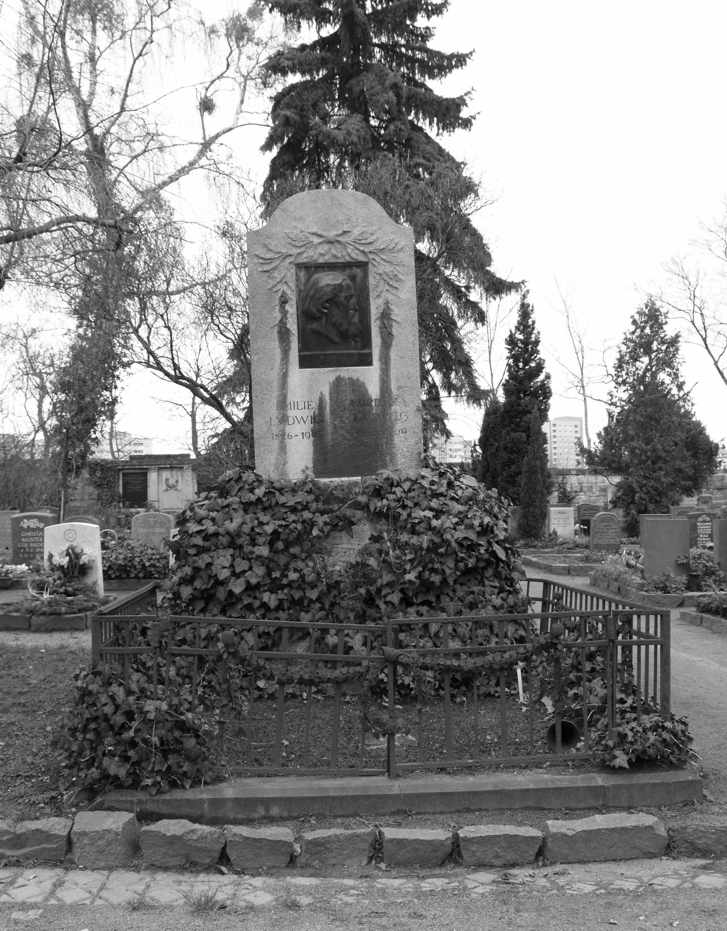
Otto Ludwig's grave on Trinitatis Cemetery in Dresden

Otto Ludwig (February 11, 1813 – February 25, 1865) was a German dramatist, novelist and critic born in Eisfeld in Thuringia. He was one of Germany's first modern realists and one of the most notable dramatists of the period. His major works include the 1856 novel Between Heaven and Earth.

== Biography ==
His father, who was syndic of Eisfeld, died when he was twelve years old, and he was brought up amidst uncongenial conditions. He had devoted his leisure time to poetry and music, which unfitted him for the mercantile career planned for him. The attention of the Duke of Meiningen was directed to one of his musical compositions, an opera, Die Köhlerin (The Charcoal Burner), and Ludwig was enabled in 1839 to continue his musical studies under Felix Mendelssohn in Leipzig.

But ill health and constitutional shyness caused him to give up a musical career and he turned exclusively to literary studies, and wrote several stories and dramas. Of the latter, Der Erbförster (The Hereditary Forester) (1850) attracted immediate attention as a masterly psychological study. It was followed by Die Makkabäer (The Maccabees) (1852), in which the realistic method of Der Erbförster was transferred to an historical milieu, which allowed more brilliant coloring and a freer play of the imagination. With these tragedies, to which may be added Die Rechte des Herzens (The Rights of the Heart) and Das Fräulein von Scuderi (The Lady of Scuderi), the comedy Hans Frey, and an unfinished tragedy on the subject of Agnes Bernauer, Ludwig ranks immediately after Christian Friedrich Hebbel as Germany's most notable dramatic poet at the middle of the 19th century.

Meanwhile he had married and settled permanently in Dresden, where he turned his attention to fiction. He published a series of admirable stories of Thuringian life, characterized by the same attention to minute detail and careful psychological analysis as his dramas. Some of these include Die Heiteretei und ihr Widerspiel (1851), and Ludwig's masterpiece, the powerful novel Zwischen Himmel und Erde (Between Heaven and Earth) (1855). In his Shakespeare-Studien (1871) Ludwig showed himself a discriminating critic, with a fine insight into the hidden springs of the creative imagination. So great, however, was his enthusiasm for Shakespeare, that he was led to depreciate Friedrich Schiller in a way which found little favour among his countrymen. He died in Dresden in 1865. His detailed analyses and observations of Shakespearean plays were published posthumously.
