= Emil and the Detectives (1935 film) =

1935 film by Milton Rosmer

- Trade advertisement
- Directed by: Milton Rosmer
- Written by: Erich Kästner (novel); Cyrus Brooks; Margaret Carter; Frank Launder; Billy Wilder
- Produced by: Richard Wainwright
- Starring: John Williams; George Hayes; Mary Glynne
- Cinematography: Mutz Greenbaum; George Stretton
- Edited by: Cyril Heck
- Music by: Allan Gray
- Production company: Richard Wainwright Productions
- Distributed by: Gaumont British Distributors
- Release date: 5 February 1935
- Running time: 71 minutes
- Country: United Kingdom
- Language: English

Emil and the Detectives (also known as Emil) is a 1935 British family adventure film directed by Milton Rosmer and starring John Williams, George Hayes and Mary Glynne. It was written by Cyrus Brooks, Margaret Carter, Frank Launder and Billy Wilder based on the 1928 novel by Erich Kästner.

It is a remake of the 1931 German film Emil und die Detektive with the main setting moved from Berlin to London. Otherwise it follows the original closely, including the music by Allan Gray, and recreating many of the same camera shots. It was made at Shepperton Studios.

== Plot ==
While on a train from his home in the countryside to stay with his grandfather in London, a boy named Emil suspects that he has been robbed of his money by a suspicious-looking man in the same carriage wearing a bowler hat. In London, with the help of a gang of street children, he pursues the suspect until he is eventually able to recover the money.

== Cast ==
- John Williams as Emil Blake
- George Hayes as The Man in the Bowler Hat, Sam Pinker
- Mary Glynne as Mrs. Blake
- Clare Greet as grandma
- George Merritt as PC
- Marion Foster as Polly
- Donald Pittman as Gussy
- Robert Rietti as Professor
- John Singer as Tuesday
- Derek Blomfield as Jerry
- Norman Atkyns as man
- Ricky Hyland as The Flying Stag

== Reception ==
The Monthly Film Bulletin wrote: "Hayes is excellent as the villain, but the children are not convincing. It is difficult to forget that they are acting and this is detrimental to the success of the film. ... Nevertheless the film is very entertaining and, particularly in the scenes in the hotel, exciting."

The Daily Film Renter wrote: "Delightful modern fantasy, in which street urchins trail and capture wanted criminal. Replete with adventure, tracking, gangs, passwords and secret signs – film has appeal for children and adults alike, thrills, suspense, and dramatic moments being powerfully built up."
