= Joon Lee =

Korean American rapper (born 1972)

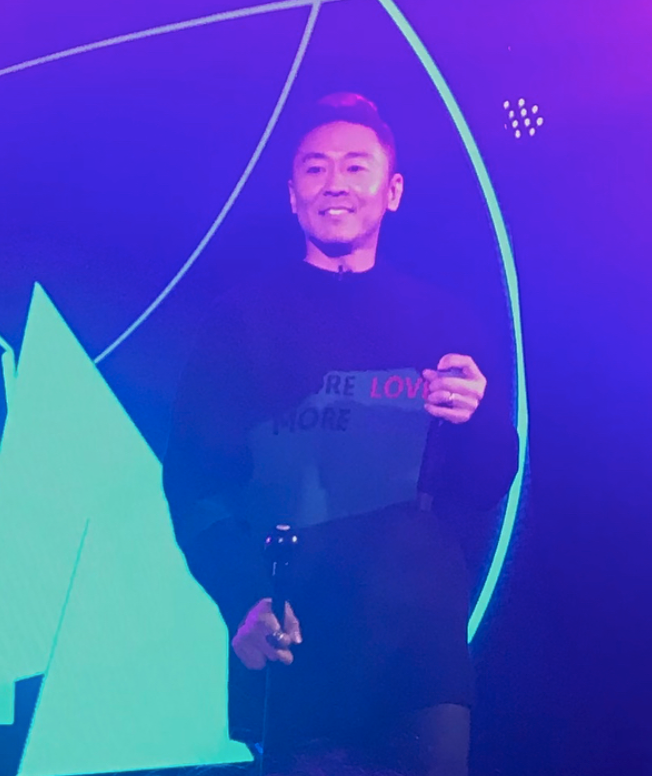
- Joon Lee at the Solid fifth studio album, Into the light, launch party on March 21, 2018, in Seoul, South Korea
- Born: Joon Lee; March 23, 1972 (age 54); Seoul, South Korea
- Other names: DJ Akshon; DJ Action
- Education: University of Southern California
- Occupations: Rapper, singer, entrepreneur
- Years active: 1993–1997, 2018–present
- Musical career
- Genres: R&B; Hip hop
- Instruments: Vocals; Turntables
- Website: solid.kr

Korean name
- Hangul: 이준
- RR: I Jun
- MR: I Chun

Signature
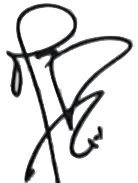

John Lee (born March 23, 1972), better known by his Korean name, Joon Lee (Korean: 이준), is a Korean American rapper, singer, songwriter, DJ, and most notably one-third of the South Korean R&B/hip-hop trio, Solid. He introduced turntablism to Korea in the mid '90s. He rose to fame and gained popularity in 1995 with the breakout hit "Holding Onto the End of the Night" (Korean: 이밤의 끝을 잡고), from Solid's second album The Magic of 8 Ball (1995).

Lee is regarded as part of the first generation of Korean rappers like the members of Uptown and Hyundo Lee. He became not only one of the most sought after rappers in the South Korean music industry of the '90s collaborating with renown artists including 015B (ko), Jinyoung Park, Roo'ra, and Uptown but also an inspiration to the next generation of rappers – Gary of Leessang, Jinpyo Kim and Flowsik to name a few. Lee, with two other members of Solid, was at the forefront of bringing the American hip-hop sound to South Korean audience and played a pivotal role establishing the genre during a time when ballad and dance music were prevalent.

Joon Lee was one of the first Korean Americans to become successful in the South Korean music industry, and opened the door for more Koreans from overseas to enter into the Korean entertainment industry; the industry began seeking talents from abroad proactively thereafter.

He has been synonymous with eight-ball cane from which he was inseparable during his performances of Solid; subsequently, the eight-ball quickly became the symbol of the group.

In addition to being a musician, he runs a real estate development company in California with about 30 employees.

== Early life ==
John Lee was born Joon Lee (Korean: 이준) on March 23, 1972, in Seoul, South Korea. He and his family immigrated to the United States in 1980. Lee is the oldest of two siblings and has one sister, named Jackie. Lee and Jaeyoon Chong grew up in the same neighborhood in Orange County, California. Not only their families vacationed together frequently, they attended the same Korean American church in Fountain Valley, Ca, where they participated in musical activities during their formative years. Lee met Johan Kim at a public library in Fountain Valley, CA, during their high school years; soon after they became friends, Lee invited Kim to his church. Three became close instantaneously over music and breakdancing while at the epicenter of the golden age of hip-hop, which later heavily influences their music.

He purchased a cheap set of turntables and a mixer after watching Beat Street (1984) and began teaching himself how to manipulate them when he was in fifth grade. He got into rapping when he heard Run-DMC as a teenage boy. By the time he was in his late teens, he won numerous DJ competitions in California including the Long Beach DJ competition in 1991.

Lee attended Edison High School, Huntington Beach, Ca, and got his bachelor's degree from University of Southern California in 1999.

== Music career ==
=== 1992–1997: Solid ===
Early 1990s, Lee along with Jaeyoon Chong and Johan Kim took part in the early production of L.A. Boyz albums as they were all friends. After noticing their complementary set of skills, then L.A. Boyz manager pursued them to be a boy band to debut in Taiwan adding a fourth member who was fluent in Chinese. Lee took the opportunity hoping that it would allow him to advance and demonstrate his skills to wider audience – maturing his musicianship was a byproduct. Solid was officially formed in 1992. Realizing that they had a potential to debut as a musical group, they also sent a demo tape to South Korea. Despite the Taiwanese management company's impressive deal, Solid decided to accept the offer from the Korean management company, IM Communications, wanting to debut in their motherland. Under the condition that he would eventually come back to finish his undergraduate degree, Lee's parents granted him a permission to pursue music career in Korea.

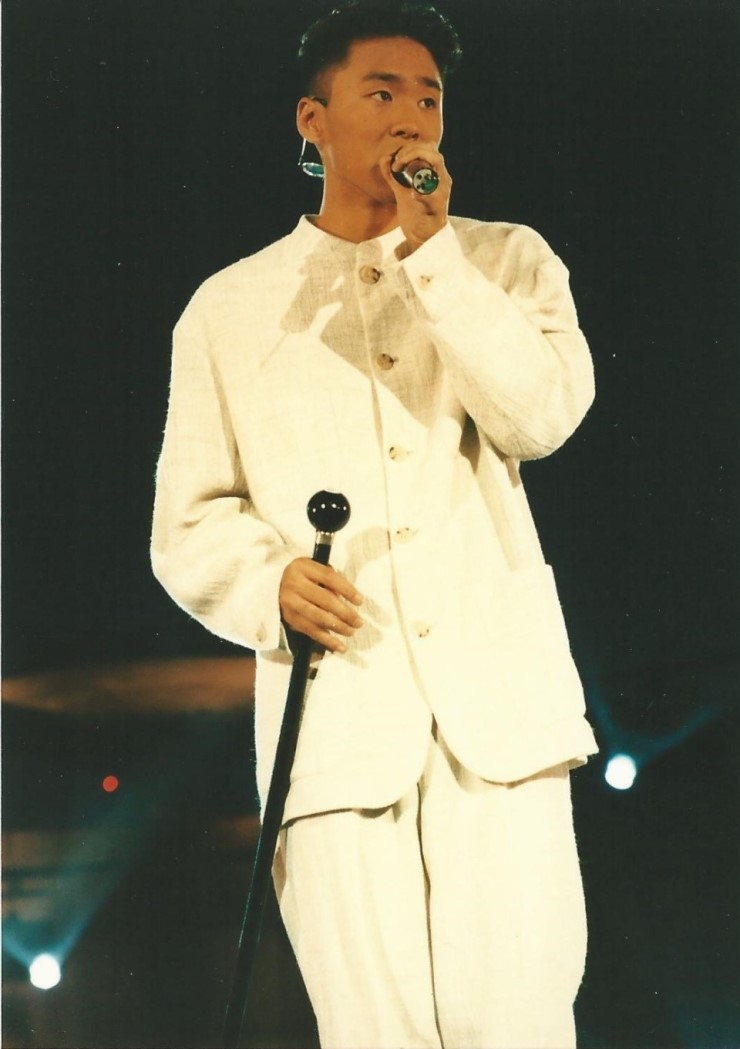
Joon Lee during a Solid performance, Seoul, Korea, in 1995

When Lee came into Korean music scene in the 1990s, the industry lacked rappers – or musicians in general – resembling the American hip-hop flair and style of Lee's who was considered to have a unique voice that was a true stand-out. Before Solid's career took off in 1995, he was a featured rapper on "Bob Hair" (Korean: 단발머리), Big 5, by 015B (1994). As Solid's debut album, Give Me a Chance (1993), was a flop due to various reasons – among them were conflicts with their management company and marketing/promotional issues – Hoil Jang, a director of the album, wanting the talents of Solid to go unwasted, invited Lee and Kim to be part of his forthcoming album and their concerts, Strikes Back (1994). People who listened to "Bob Hair" easily thought the rapper spewing splendid English rhymes was an African American rapper from the U.S. without a doubt.

One of many feats that made the Solid's breakout hit "Holding the End of the Night" (Korean: 이밤의 끝을 잡고), The Magic of 8 Ball (1995), striking and great was Lee's irreplaceable bass toned narration interludes; Lee also demonstrated his vocal ability to harmonize and that there were more facets to his voice than being a rapper.

Apart from contributing his voice to the sound of Solid, Lee was responsible for the distinct hip-hop sound of turntable scratches on all tracks of Solid's albums. Lee is considered to be the first hip-hop DJ in Korea introducing what American hip-hop sounds like to Korean audience.

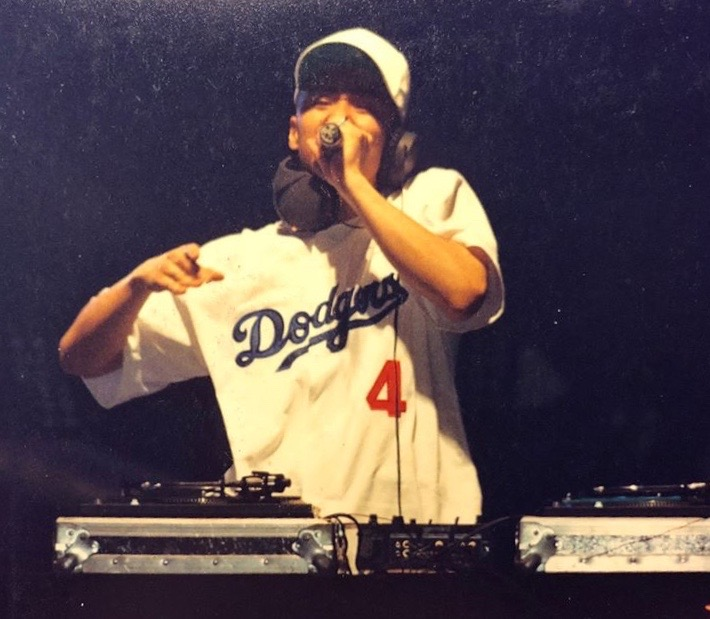
Joon Lee during the Deliverance Tour of Solid, Seoul, Korea, in 1996

As the albums of Solid progressed, Lee expanded his musicianship. It wasn't unusual for him to write all the lyrics to his raps but he added himself as a lyricist for a full song on his credentials writing "Dream" (Korean: 꿈) on the second album of Solid, The Magic of 8 Ball (1995). Lee later revealed that the song was based on the lost dream with his estranged friend whom he reconnected after the song release. On the third album, Light Camera Action! (1996), Lee became a minted songwriter composing a hip-hop track, "If It's For You" (Korean: 널 위해서라면).

Solid sold over four million albums during their short-lived four-year run in South Korea, making them one of the biggest musical acts of the '90s in the Korean music industry, nonetheless, their contribution to the development of current sound of K-Pop lasted thus far. Chart topping singles by Solid have become beloved K-Pop classics, which are "Holding the End of the Night" (Korean: 이밤의 끝을 잡고), "My Only Friend" (Korean: 나만의 친구), "You Are My First and Last" (Korean: 넌 나의 처음이자 마지막이야), "Happy Ending" (Korean: 해피엔딩), and "Meant To Be" (Korean: 천생연분).

Lee shared the same apartment with Chong and Kim during the most days of Solid in Seoul, Korea, in the '90s where fans constantly flocked to.

In an interview during the promotion of "Holding the End of the Night" (Korean: 이밤의 끝을 잡고), Lee stated that he never imagined himself being part of a musical act performing on stage.

Putting behind the whirlwind days of Solid, Lee went back to being a student at University of Southern California, in July 1997, in the midst of speculations to why the group came to a halt at the height of their career.

=== 1998–2009: Music career during hiatus from Solid ===
During the prolonged hiatus from Solid, music shifted to somewhat on the sideline of his life as he ventured into business opportunities in the U.S., yet he always yearned for producing music in any way or form. Lee was an occasional featuring artist and a songwriter for notable artists and hip-hop compilation albums from the late '90s to 2000s – among them are Jinpyo Kim, Roo'ra, G.o.d., Uptown, a fellow member of Solid, Johan Kim, Hyundo Lee and more. As he continued to reside in the U.S. since Solid's extensive break had begun, his TV appearances in Korea was non-existent.

In March 2005, Lee joined Johan Kim at Kim's 'White Day Live Concert' in Seoul, Korea and both shed light on the possibility of the group's reunion.

In December 2006, Lee recorded a single with a fellow member of Solid, Jaeyoon Chong for a newly formed R&B/Hip-hop group, Soul-Town. Lee and Chong teamed up with two members of Uptown, Yeonjoon Jung and Steve Kim. They released a single, "You Are My Lady," in April 2007 in the midst of a high anticipation from their long-awaited fans and critics alike. "You Are My Lady" became No. 1 hit on the radio chart in Korea in the third week of April 2007 without any promotion.

Last album that Lee can be found as a featured artist before the Solid reunion in 2018 is a Christmas complication album, Winter Line No. 1, in 2009 on a track "White Winter" (Korean: 하얀겨울).

His music career became dormant since the birth of his first child around the end of the 2000s as his priorities veered towards family and real estate business.

=== 2018–present: Solid reunion and Into the Light, fifth studio album ===
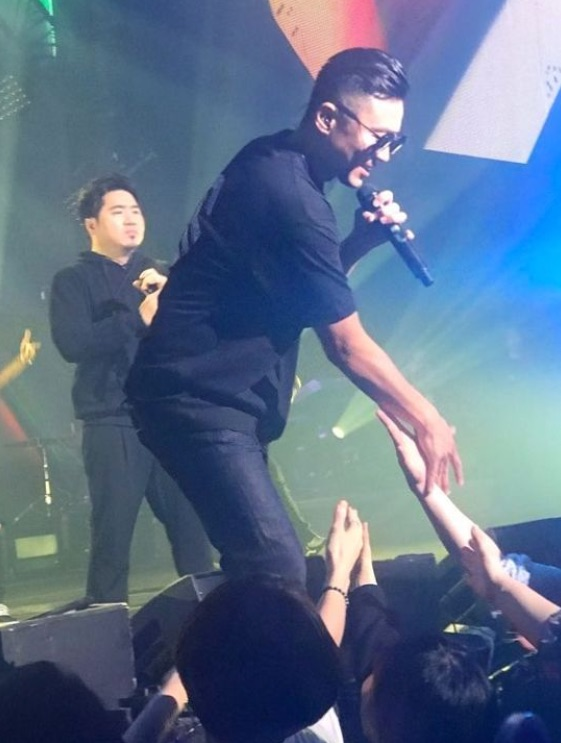
Lee performing "Happy Ending" during Into the Light concert, Seoul, Korea on May 20, 2018

To prepare for the Solid's reunion and the album release, a weekly meeting – lasting two to four hours – took place via Skype every Tuesday since the end of 2016, and the members discussed every little details that have gone into the new album in twenty one years. Beginning September 2017, Lee has been splitting his time between California, U.S. and Seoul, Korea traveling to the latter once a month – two weeks at a time – to move forward with Into the Light (2018).

As with their previous albums, Lee wrote his own rap parts, which took much longer to write and record than his previous works. He later stated that he felt the most pressured as he had been away from the entertainment industry the longest compared to the other members. Only hesitation that held him back from the comeback was the fear of not meeting the expectations of the fans who remembered Solid from the '90s, however, he decided to proceed for the love of making music was greater.

Early March, Solid announced their long-awaited comeback on official social media and released series of teasers for the forthcoming album on the official YouTube channel. The very first teaser plays an excerpt from the 1996 Solid tour, Deliverance, in which Lee addresses to fans at the end of the Seoul concert that "This is not the end of Solid" insinuating that the new chapter of the trio is to begin while heightening the anticipation of the album release.

During early promotion of Into the Light, Lee repeatedly expressed the awkwardness of getting back the celebrity status for his life has long been away from the spotlight. Yet, he also expressed how much he enjoys and loves taking everything on their own terms this time around without any contract with a label or a management company.

Solid released their fifth studio album, Into the Light, on March 22, 2018, peaking at number 1 on iTunes R&B/Soul album chart in Korea and number 5 on iTunes K-pop album charts in Korea and the U.S. The album received rave reviews having everyone, fans and critics alike, agreed that the forward sound of Solid's musicianship hasn't been lost at all after not working together for over two decades. Solid surpassed everyone's expectation by presenting the much evolved and progressive current sound of Solid not dwelling on their glory-days sound of the '90s.

May 18 through 20th, 2018, the trio started the second tour of their career, Into the Light, with packed audiences at Blue Square iMarket Hall in Seoul, Korea, in which Lee performed with an elite Canadian beatboxer KRNFX playing his turntable set.

== Personal life ==
Lee married in June 2004, and the wedding took place in California, U.S. Lee and his wife have three children: a daughter and fraternal twins (a boy and girl). In an interview, Lee stated that his children were never aware of his music career in Korea. Even after the reunion of Solid, his children still don't seem to care much about the fame and unbeknownst rapper status belonging to once a heartthrob of the '90s. Lee has been in real estate business in California for the past twenty years. He built his own house in California, modeled after one of the Case Study Houses representing the quintessential mid-20th century architecture of California.

== Discography ==
=== Solid ===
- Give Me a Chance (1993; Re-released in 1995)
- The Magic of 8 Ball (1995)
- Light Camera Action! (1996)
- Solidate (1997)
- Into the Light (2018)

=== Soul-Town ===
- My Lady, EP (2007)

=== As a featured artist ===
- "Bob Hair" (Korean: 단발머리), Big 5, by 015B (1994)
- "Say 1, 2, 3," It's Time, by J.Y. Park (1996)
- "Right This Moment" (Korean: 지금 이 순간을), Jangwoo, by Jangwoo Lee (1996)
- "Late Night" (Korean: 밤이여), Six N`Six, by Roo'ra (1999)
- '2 Many MC's,' Verbal Medication, by Uptown (1999)
- "Holding the End of the Night" (Korean: 이밤의 끝을 잡고), Johan 2, by Johan Kim (1999)
- "Tell Me," Korea 2000 대한민국, by various artists (2000)
- "Fairy of Shampoo" (Korean: 샴푸의 요정), JP3, by Jinpyo Kim (2001)
- "Fire," HipHop Kharisma, by various artists (2002)
- "Hip-Hop Rescuers" (Korean: 힙합구조대), The New Classik ...And You Don't Stop, by Hyundo Lee and various artists (2004)
- "Joy,"The New Classik ...And You Don't Stop, by Hyundo Lee and various artists (2004)
- "White Winter" (Korean: 하얀겨울), Winter Line No. 1, by various artists (2009)
- "Easy Listening," Monthly Yoon Jong Shin: May Issue (Korean: 월간 윤종신), by Yoon Jong Shin (2020)
- "One Weekend," Voyage.01, by SAVIYN (2020)

=== As a songwriter ===
- "If It's For You" (Korean: 널 위해서라면), Light Camera Action!, by Solid (1996)
- "Why Do I Again" (Korean: 왜 또 다시 난), Chapter 1, by G.o.d (1999)
- "Late Night" (Korean: 밤이여), Six N`Six, by Roo'ra (1999)
- 'UPT ParadoXXX,' '2 Many MC's,’ 'All I wanna do'; 'Rock this mutha f***er,' Verbal Medication, by Uptown (1999)
- "Love of My Life," Johan 2, by Johan Kim (1999)
- "Tell Me," Korea 2000 대한민국 (2000)
- "Fire," HipHop Kharisma (2002)
- "Don't Do It," My Lady, by Soul-Town (2007)

== Concerts and tours ==
=== Solid ===
- Deliverance (1996)
- Into the Light (2018)

== Awards ==
- Golden Disc category, Korea Visual and Records Grand Prize Award (1995)
