= Machi (hip-hop group) =

Taiwanese hip-hop group

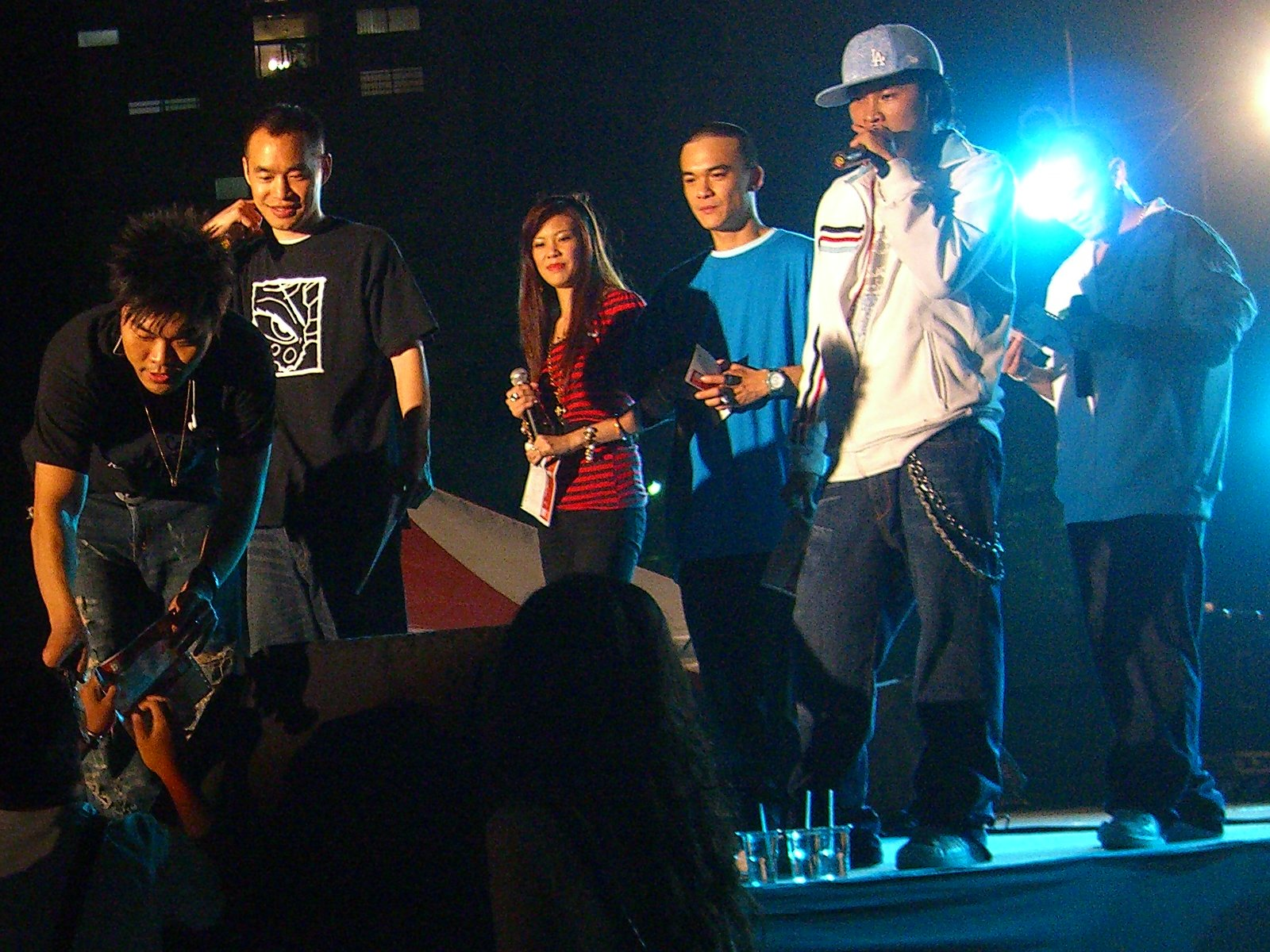
- Machi at Shih Hsin University's 50th anniversary celebration concert, 14 October 2006
- Born: Taiwan
- Years active: 2003–present
- Musical career
- Origin: Taiwan
- Genres: Hip-hop, rap, Taiwanese hip-hop
- Labels: Warner Music Group; Machi Entertainment

Machi (Chinese: 麻吉; pinyin: májí; Pe̍h-ōe-jī: Mâ-kiat) is a Taiwanese hip-hop group that has nine active members, with two additional members on a hiatus from group activities.

== Members ==
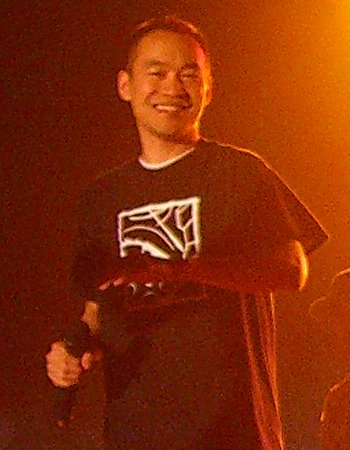
Jeffrey Huang

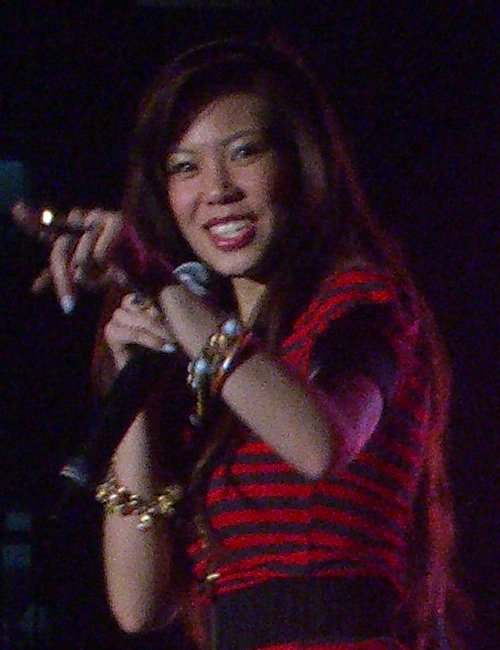
Mel Yang

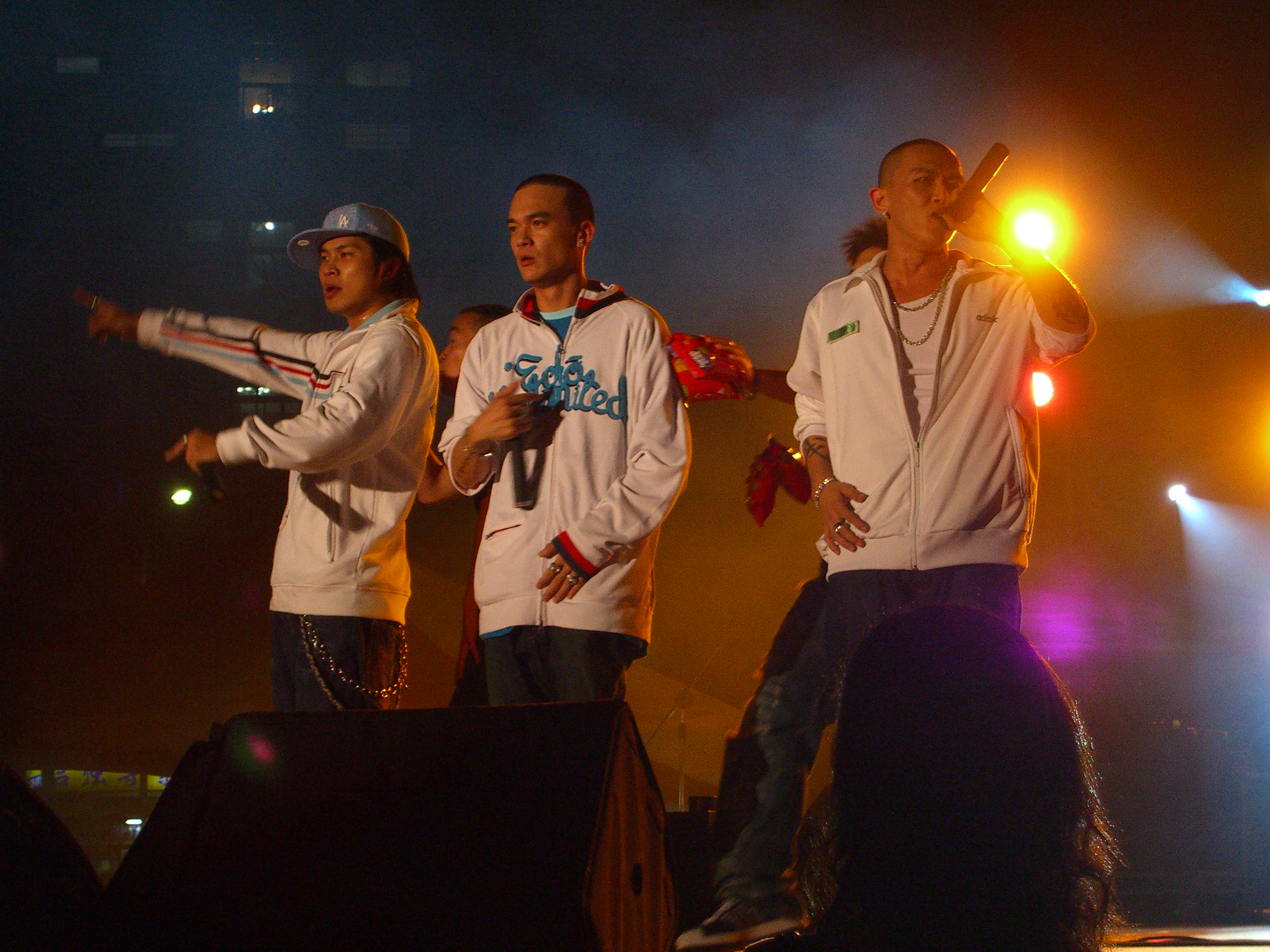

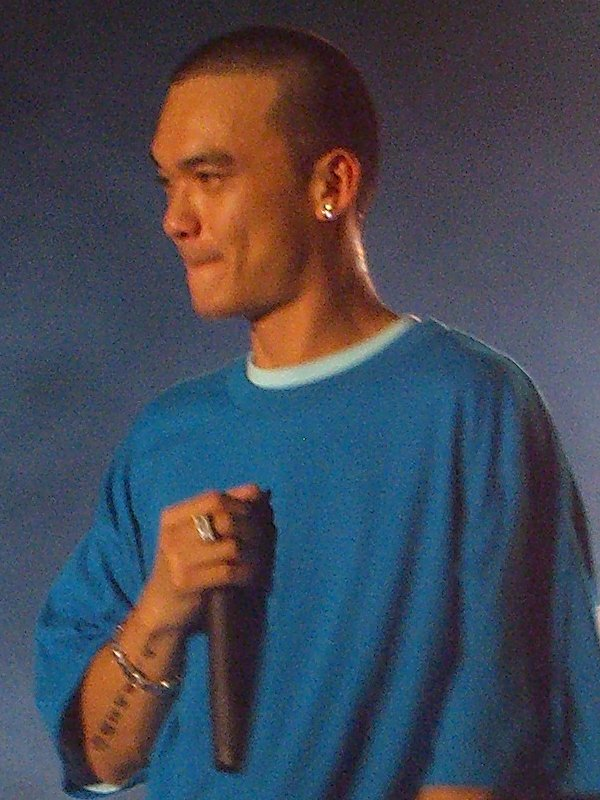

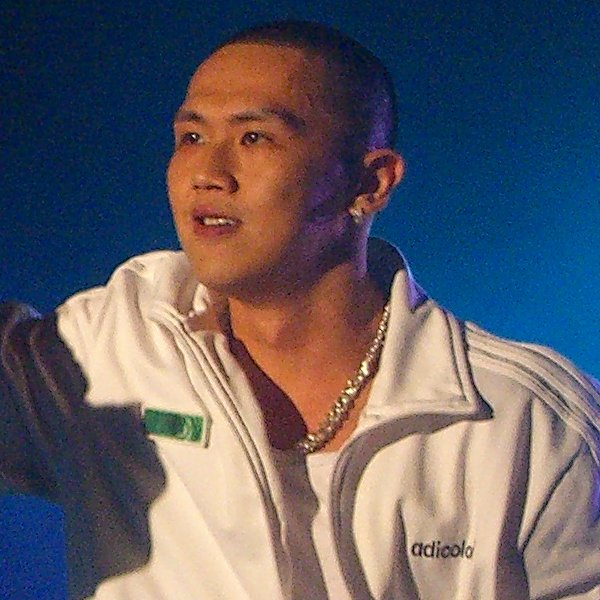

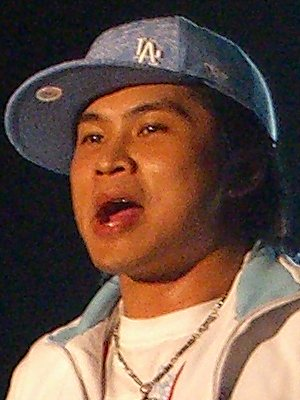

=== Current ===
- Jeff, Huang Li Cheng (Chinese: 黃立成; Pe̍h-ōe-jī: N̂g Li̍p-sêng)
- Stan, Huang Li Xing (Chinese: 黃立行; Pe̍h-ōe-jī: N̂g Li̍p-hêng)
- Jae Chong
- Andrew, Zhou Li Ming (Chinese: 周立銘; Pe̍h-ōe-jī: Chiu Li̍p-bêng)
- Nicky, Li Jiu Zhe (Chinese: 李玖哲; Pe̍h-ōe-jī: Lí Kiú-tiat)
- Edward, Huang Li Quan (Chinese: 黃立全; Pe̍h-ōe-jī: N̂g Li̍p-choân)
- Mel, Yang Yun He (Chinese: 楊韻禾; Pe̍h-ōe-jī: Iûⁿ Ūn-hô)
- Luke, Cui Wei Kai (Chinese: 崔惟楷; Pe̍h-ōe-jī: Chhui Ûi-khái)
- Suffa, Fei Luu Feng (Chinese: 費聿鋒; Pe̍h-ōe-jī: Hùi U̍t-hong)
- Don P, Hong Jian Jun (Chinese: 洪健鈞; Pe̍h-ōe-jī: Âng Kiān-kun)

=== Former or inactive ===
- Steven, Lin Zhi Wen
- Kenny, Zhou Yi Ming
- Gabe, Lan Jun Tian (Chinese: 藍鈞天; Pe̍h-ōe-jī: Lâm Kun-thian)

=== Founders ===
- Bobby Sheng
- Jae Chong
- Jeffery Huang

== International collaborations ==
MACHI collaborated with well-known hip-hop artist Missy Elliott after meeting in New York. Missy Elliott was impressed by Taiwanese rap and remixed her well-known song "Work It" with Machi's Jump 2003; resulting in the debut crossover Work it, Jump 2003. Producer Floss P, from Dr. Dre's Aftermath music label, also produced a track "You Can't Do It" for MACHI on their second album 2nd Opus in July 2004. MACHI then looked around Asia and teamed up with Asia's top Turntablist DJ TOMMY from Hong Kong on their third album Superman.

== MACHI Entertainment ==
MACHI Entertainment is one of the largest Asian hip-hop/rap record labels. It was founded in Taiwan by super music producer Jae Chong and business partners Jeffrey Huang and Bobby Sheng. The label is independent of Warner Music Taiwan. As a member of the group SOLID, Jae Chong sold millions of records in Korea and later became one of the most prolific music producers in Asia with more than 50 million albums sold all over the world. He partnered with Jeffrey Huang and Bobby Sheng who founded TheOne Technology Group back when they were still based in Los Angeles. TheOne Technology Group specialized in bridging the cultural and language barriers for Internet-based projects. Together, they acquired a clientele list including IBM, Nike and Hewlett-Packard. In 2000 they orchestrated a $60,000,000, three-company merger that combined TheOne Technology group and Dynalab with DynaComware. Together, they re-structured the company in Japan and has positioned it for an IPO on the Japan Stock Exchange in 2005.

Their new venture, MACHI Entertainment is their response to the emerging entertainment sector and the demand for urban music in the entertainment industry in Asia. In 2001, they founded Machi Entertainment Group, the leading music and television production company for the "Urban" genre in Taiwan. Machi established itself as the leader in Music production in Asia with leading talents such as Jeffrey Huang, Jay Chou, Missy Elliott, A-mei, Stanley Huang, Jolin Tsai, Vanness Wu, Elva Hsiao, Coco Lee, Brandy, Nicky Lee, Melody Yeung, and solid partnerships with Warner Music Group, Virgin EMI, and Sony. Machi Entertainment has also established itself by investing in foreign distribution and television production.

== Libel suit ==
Group founder Jeff Huang was sued by a Republic of China legislator for libel. The rap song "Retribution" released in 2005 implied possible death for corrupt legislators who may have passed laws to possibly make it easier to illegally copy and distribute music in Taiwan. The Taipei District Court found him innocent on 11 May 2007, citing no "intention of malice".

== Discography ==
#	Information
1st	Hwang Li Cheng & Machi (黃立成 & 麻吉): Released: March 2003; Tracks: 1. Intro; 2. 麻吉; 3. Jump 2003; 4. 最愛; 5. 我是為你活; 6. 911; 7. 台灣之子; 8. Jump, Work it!!!; 9. 麻吉 (Kala); 10. Jump 2003 (Kala)
2nd	2nd Opus (第貳樂章): Released: July 2004; Tracks: 1. Jeff宣言; 2. 爽 3. Oh!社會; 4. 印度神遊; 5. 緣投與阿醜1979; 6. 緣投與阿醜2004; 7. Hey,Baby; 8. Playboy; 9. 紅不讓; 10. 我的世界; 11. You can't do it 12. 嘸!你麥按怎; 13. 舉起來; 14. Playboy (English version); 15. 印度神遊 (Clean version)
3rd	Superman (超人): Released: November 2005; Tracks: 1. 屌 2. 沒辦法; 3. 超人; 4. 大俠; 5. Giving u what u want 6. Reason; 7. 石頭變黃金; 8. 決戰夜; 9. 報應; 10. 我愛周星星; 11. Super Machi Remix by DJ Tommy

== See also ==
- L.A. Boyz
