= Awakening (Aziatix EP) =

EP by Aziatix
- Released: May 2, 2012
- Recorded: 2012
- Studio: Astar Studio
- Genre: Hip-hop, R&B
- Length: 21:15
- Label: Astar, Inc.; Universal Music Group International
- Producer: Jae Chong

Aziatix chronology
Nocturnal (2011)	Awakening (2012)	Top of the World (2015)

Singles from Awakening
- 1. "Speed of Light" Released: 17 April 2012; 2. "Alright" Released: 2 May 2012

Awakening is a second EP by Asian-American hip-hop group, Aziatix, released on 2 May 2012 by Astar, Inc. and Universal Music Group International. Two singles were released from the EP.

== Background ==
Awakening is the second extended play (EP) recorded and released by Aziatix after their self-titled debut EP, which was released in May 2011. The group said the EP was inspired by their experience on meeting people who face struggles and hardships during the promotional tour of their debut album, Nocturnal. They said: "From natural disasters to the global economic crisis, we were moved to go back into the studio and reflect and convey what we witnessed and experienced. Ultimately the album ended up being an album about hope".

== Promotion and singles ==
Awakening was released on 2 May 2012. It was later released in Japan on 15 May and debuted at number one spot on the Seoul Club Rap CD pre-order chart at number 8 and maintained at the top spot until number 14.

"Speed of Light" was released as the EP's first single on 17 April 2012 with an accompanying music video. The song was originally titled titled "299.792.458", which refers to how many meters light travels in a second when Aziatix released a teaser of the song.

The second single, "Alright", was released on 2 May 2012 with an accompanying music video, concurrently with the release of Awakening. A teaser video of the song was released on 25 April.

== Track listing ==
No.	Title	Writer(s)	Length
1.	"Speed of Light"	Jae Chong	3:28
2.	"Alright"	Jae Chong; Aziatix	3:45
3.	"Radio"	Jae Chong; Eddie Shin; Flowsik	3:12
4.	"If I Saw You Again"	Jae Chong; Nicky Lee; Flowsik	3:37
5.	"History"	Jae Chong; Eddie Shin; Flowsik	3:53
6.	"Lights"	Jae Chong; Eddie Shin; Flowsik	3:18
Total length:			21:15

Notes

- "Alright" contains a sample from "Somebody's Watching Me" written and performed by Rockwell.

== Personnel ==
- Aziatix:
  - Eddie Shin – vocals, composer, lyricist
  - Nicky Lee – vocals, composer, lyricist
  - Flowsik – rap, composer, lyricist
- Jae Chong – producer, arranger, mixer
- Astar Studio - recording studio

== Charts ==
Weekly chart performance for Awakening
Chart (2012)	Peak position
Korean Albums (Gaon Albums Chart)	32
Overseas Korean Albums (Gaon Albums Chart)	7
Taiwan Albums (G-Music)	11
