= Nocturnal (Aziatix album) =

Studio album by Aziatix
- Released: July 27, 2011
- Recorded: 2011
- Studio: Aziatix Studio
- Genres: Hip-hop, R&B
- Length: 36:14
- Labels: Music Cube; Universal Music Group International
- Producer: Jae Chong

Aziatix chronology
Aziatix (2011)	Nocturnal (2011)	Awakening (2012)

Singles from Nocturnal
- 1. "Go" Released: March 2011; 2. "Cold" Released: 2011; 3. "Slippin Away" Released: 2011

Alternative cover
- Japanese Deluxe edition cover

Nocturnal is a debut studio album by Asian-American hip-hop group, Aziatix. It was released on 27 July 2011 by Music Cube and Universal Music Group International. The album contains most of their tracks from their self-titled debut EP which was released two months earlier. It topped the charts in Japan and Korea and reached the top 10 in Gaon Albums Chart Overseas. An instrumental version of Nocturnal was released on 4 October 2011, followed by a Japanese Deluxe Edition of the album, which was released on 18 January 2012.

== Production and release ==
Nocturnal includes all six tracks from their self-titled debut EP, which was released in May 2011, as well as new tracks. The album was produced by Jae Chong and executive produced by Monica Shin.

The album was preceded by the release of their debut single, "Go", which was released in March 2011 as part of their self-titled EP prior to inclusion in Nocturnal album. The album was released on 28 July with "Cold", "Slippin Away" was released as further singles and later made into music videos.

Nocturnal was well received, earning Aziatix the Best New Asian Artist category at the 2011 MNET Asian Music Awards shortly after its release. A Japanese Deluxe edition of the album was released on 18 January 2012, containing three new tracks and remixed version of "Be With You" as well as an acoustic version of "Go".

Boon Chan from The Straits Times wrote the album had "the trio sing and rap mostly about girls over thumping beats and synthesizer hooks".

== Artwork ==
The cover art for the album features the members of Aziatix sitting on a black couch with a background of white wall.

== Track listing ==
No.	Title	Writer(s)	Length
1.	"Intro"	Jae Chong	0:50
2.	"Slippin Away"	Jae Chong; Aziatix	3:37
3.	"Superstar"	Jae Chong; Eddie Shin; Flowsik	3:54
4.	"Whatchu Know About Us"	Jae Chong; Nicky Lee; Flowsik	3:39
5.	"A Game"	Jae Chong; Eddie Shin; Flowsik	3:18
6.	"Cold"	Jae Chong; Eddie Shin; Flowsik	3:26
7.	"Be With You"	Jae Chong; Eddie Shin; Flowsik	3:37
8.	"Start It Again"	Jae Chong; Eddie Shin; Flowsik	3:26
9.	"Another Day"	Jae Chong; Flowsik	2:51
10.	"Go"	Jae Chong; Eddie Shin; Flowsik	3:35
11.	"Say Yeah"	Jae Chong; Eddie Shin; Flowsik	3:41
Total length:			36:14

Japanese Deluxe edition bonus tracks
No.	Title	Length
12.	"Lights"	3:19
13.	"Nothing Compares 2 U"	4:18
14.	"So Incredible" (feat. Stevie Huang)	4:08
15.	"Be With You" (Rock Mix)	3:39
16.	"Go" (Acoustic)	3:06
Total length:		54:21

== Personnel ==
- Aziatix:
  - Eddie Shin – vocals, composer, lyricist
  - Nicky Lee – vocals, composer, lyricist
  - Flowsik – rap, composer, lyricist
- Jae Chong – producer, arranger, mixer
- Monica Shin – executive producer
- Aziatix Studio - recording studio

== Charts ==
Weekly chart performance for Nocturnal
Chart (2011)	Peak position
Japan Albums (Oricon)	96
Korean Albums (Gaon Albums Chart)	35
Overseas Korean Albums (Gaon Albums Chart)	5
Taiwan Albums (G-Music)	14
