= Solid (band) =

South Korean R&B/Hip-Hop trio

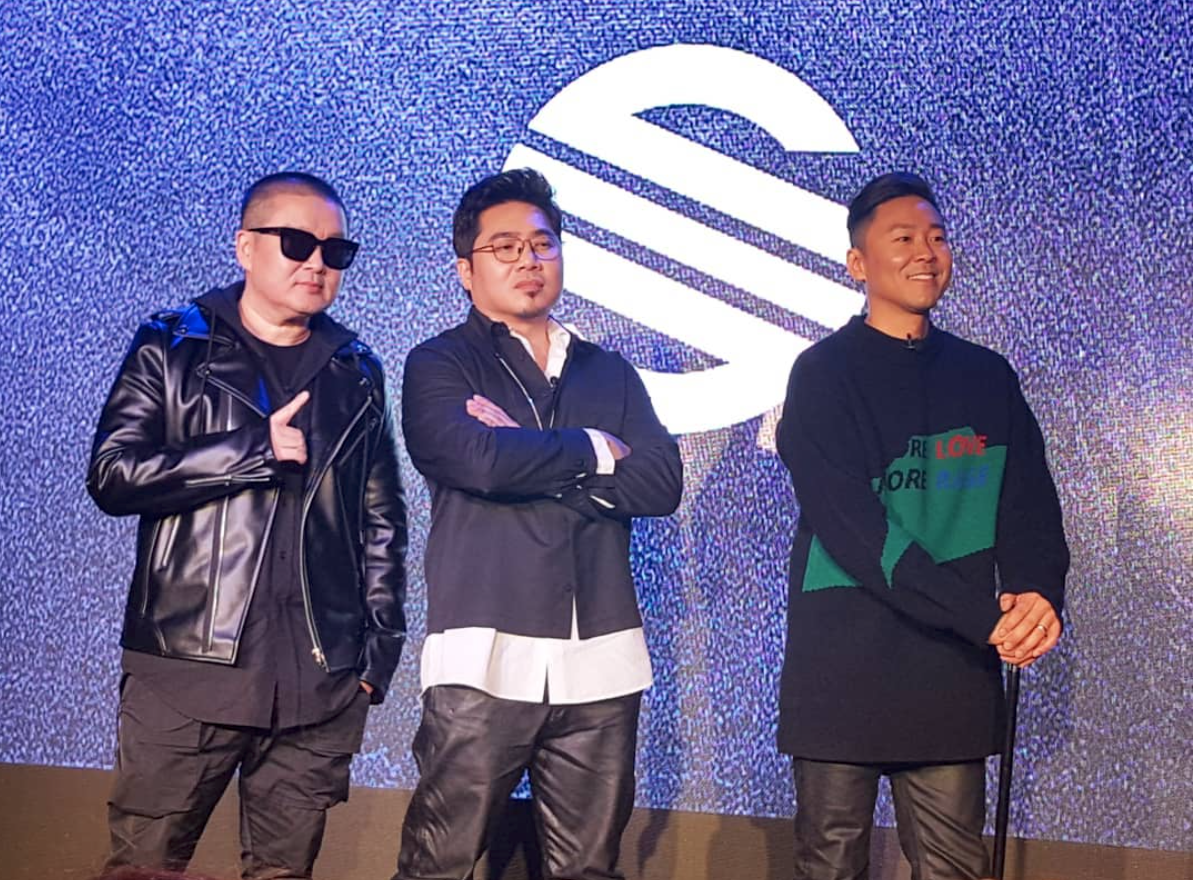
- Solid at the 5th album, Into the Light, launch party on March 21, 2018, Seoul, Korea (L-R: Jaeyoon Chong, Johan Kim, Joon Lee)

Background information
- Origin: Seoul, South Korea
- Genres: R&B; soul; hip hop; K-pop
- Years active: 1993-1997, 2018-present
- Members: Johan Kim (Korean: 김조한); Jaeyoon Chong (정재윤); Joon Lee (이준)

Solid (Korean: 솔리드) is a South Korean R&B/Hip-Hop trio. They were formed in Orange County, California, in 1992, and made their debut in Seoul, South Korea, in 1993. The group consists of Johan Kim (김조한: George Kim), Jaeyoon Chong (정재윤: Jae Chong), and Joon Lee (이준: John Lee).

The trio is recognized by fans as the "Kings of R&B" in South Korea for their contribution in establishing and popularizing the genre in Korea. They are considered to be one of the biggest influences in developing the current sound of K-pop – incorporating American styles and sounds, like R&B, rap, hip-hop, a cappella, beatboxing, and turntablism, into Korean music – with commercial hits in the mid-1990s.

As Joon Lee was inseparable from his eight-ball cane during the performances of Solid, it has quickly become the emblem of the group.

Solid released four full-length studio albums and one live album during their four-year run in the '90s from 1993 to 1997 and sold over 4 million records in Korea. Their breakout hit, Holding the End of the Night (Korean: 이밤의 끝을 잡고), from the sophomore album, The Magic of 8 Ball (1995), sold over million copies reaching the number one position on major Korean music charts solidifying them as one of the biggest musical acts in the 1990s K-Pop history. Success followed with a string of hits, "My only friend" (Korean: 나만의 친구), "You are my first and last" (Korean: 처음이자 마지막이야), "Meant to Be" (Korean: 천생연분), which allowed them to become a household name in a rotation of K-pop classic catalogue still to this day.

Three members are also notable for being the first Korean Americans to have a success in the Korean music industry paving the way for more Koreans from abroad to enter into the Korean entertainment industry. Incidentally, this worked both ways: the industry began seeking talents from abroad proactively thereafter.

The trio began an extensive break from the group in July 1997 and went on to pursue individual careers while continuing their friendship. Kim remained in Korea as a distinguished solo musician. Chong established himself as a renowned music producer abroad – Taiwan, Hong Kong, Asian music scene and the U.S. Lee became a successful business entrepreneur running a real estate development company with thirty or so employees in the U.S.

After a twenty-one-year hiatus, the trio reunited and released the fifth studio album, Into the Light (2018), on March 22, 2018.

May 18 through 20th 2018, Solid held the second concert tours of their career, Into the Light, in Seoul, Korea with packed audiences.

== History ==
=== Beginnings ===
Joon Lee and Jaeyoon Chong were childhood friends growing up in Orange County, California, whose families attended the same church. Johan Kim and Lee met at a public library in Fountain Valley, CA, Lee spotting Kim dancing by himself, and quickly formed a friendship thereafter. Lee invited Kim to their church where Kim met Chong and three teenage boys bonded through their common interests in b-boying and music, immersed in the 1980s and 1990s West-coast hip-hop culture. They had been friends with members of L.A. Boyz, whom the trio collaborated during the early days of L.A. Boyz album production. Chong had written songs, Lee took part as a turntable scratch DJ, and Kim was part of their chorus team. During their visit to L.A. Boyz recording studio, three started an impromptu singing session, which caught the attention of L.A. Boyz's manager. Subsequently, they were pursued by a Taiwanese management company to debut as a Taiwanese group adding an extra Taiwanese member. Members of Solid realizing that they had a potential to debut as a group, they also sent their demo tape to South Korea. The day before they signed onto a Taiwanese management company, Korean management company, IM Communications, got in contact with the group and the trio got to make their debut in their mother country. The group officially formed in late 1992.

=== 1993–1994: Debut and Give Me a Chance ===
May 1993, three members headed to Korea and Solid's first album, Give Me a Chance, was released on December 15, 1993, produced by Ho-il Jang of 015B. After struggling to even release their debut album, promotion or marketing was not an easy task for the young Korean Americans in a country where everything was foreign to them. Three members were students at the time, and they soon had to return to schools in California right after releasing the first album. By the time they came back to Korea to promote their debut album in May 1994, conflicts with management company ensued; marketing and promoting their album seemed almost impossible. The album was deemed "too American" at the time and didn't find much popularity with the Korean audience. With just word of mouth, Give me a chance was sold about 60,000 copies while they were back at schools in California. Even though the album was not a success at the time of release, the trio started getting recognition from musicians in the Korean music scene. They appeared as a guest artist at 015B's second concert tour, Strikes Back (1994), and collaborated with a number of prominent artists, such as Susie Kang, Hyejin Jang, Jongshin Yoon, and 015B.

After a failed attempt to resuscitate their debut album, three members went back to the U.S. ending the contract with their management company. Because Chong wanted to give one last chance, he quickly began working on a new album, and the trio returned to the studio in California in September 1994. Being eager to make their presence known to the Korean audience, Chong got in contact with one of the most renowned music producer and composer Hyung-suk Kim (ko) to make their sound more appealing and relevant to the Korean audience.

=== 1995: "Holding the End of the Night", The Magic of 8 Ball, breakthrough success ===
On March 1, 1995, they released their second full-length studio album, The Magic of 8 Ball, under their new management SeoIn, by DaeHong Music. Hyungsuk Kim being the co-producer and director along with Chong, Solid focused on honing their American sound with the Korean twist. "Holding the End of the Night" (Korean: 이밤의 끝을 잡고) was an instant hit among the sea of dance singles within a month topping Korean charts catapulting the group from an up-and-coming R&B group into a mainstream music star. Soon after "Holding the End of the Night" (Korean: 이밤의 끝을 잡고) became a hit, "My only friend" (Korean: 나만의 친구), a hip-hop number, not only helped the group advance their popularity but also demonstrated their musical versatility. With a variety of musicality exhibited in The Magic of 8 Ball, which includes a cappella, new jack swing, Latin house dance, R&B ballad, techno, house, and hip hop, Solid was not just an R&B ballad crooning trio but proved to be a group of musicians that weren't bound by a certain genre. Recognition from the wider audience, critics, and fellow musicians allowed the group to become a staple during award season at the end of 1995 winning the Golden Disc category at Korea Visual and Records Grand Prize Award.

With the success of the second album, popularity soared and fans sought after now the defunct debut album, Give me a chance. As Solid was returning to the studio for their third album, Give Me a Chance was re-issued later that year by King Record, putting both albums on top of music charts at the same time as steady sellers.

=== 1996: Light Camera Action! and first concerts ===
April 1, 1996, highly anticipated third studio album, Light Camera Action!, was released by World Music. As always, this album was entirely written and produced by the group newly adding Lee and Kim as songwriters on the album credit. Because their sophomore album was a mega hit, members admitted that the pressure was inevitable. However, trying not to dwell on the commercial success of The Magic of 8 Ball, focus was to evolve and progress as musicians. Attempting to update their sound and styles and yet trying to stay true to themselves, the trio kept their fundamental characteristics and sound but wasn't afraid to deviate from what they were used to. Chong added electric guitar sound to their single, "You are my first and last" (Korean: 넌 나의 처음이자 마지막이야) producing a bigger and stronger impact on their R&B sound and filled the album with various genres like the second album, including hip hop, rave, funk, ballad covering wide range of music in hopes to reach broader audience. Some criticized the tracks were too similar to the ones from the Magic of 8 Ball, but, critics, overall, agreed that this album even more strengthened their musical identity, sound, and styles of what only Solid could produce.

Spring of 1996 in K-pop history was known as the Battle of Stars, as series of heavy hitters were releasing albums, including Gun-Mo Kim and Seung-Hoon Shin, Solid was still topping charts with "You are my first and last" (Korean: 넌 나의 처음이자 마지막이야) and the subsequent single "Happy ending" selling over a million copies validating their status as a top selling artist with hit-making songcraft.

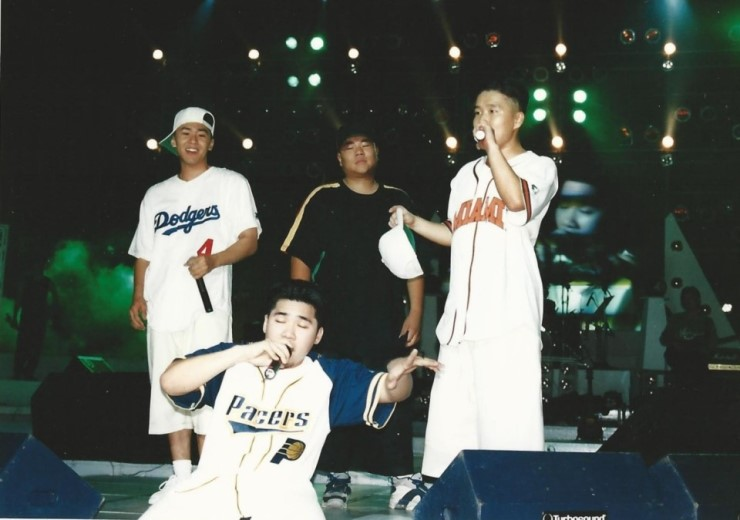
Solid during the Deliverance tour, Seoul, South Korea, on July 28, 1996

As they built a list of hits, the trio had their first concerts, Deliverance, in July over the course of three days in Busan and Seoul, Korea. Both venues, Busan KBS Hall, on July 22–23, and Olympic Gymnastics Arena in Seoul, on July 28, were a full house. Because Chong and Kim were active members of Westcoast b-boying community before they became Solid, the trio was able to invite their close breakdancing friends and rappers from California to be part of the concert creating a party-like atmosphere. Lee treated the fans with his DJing skills, which wasn't easily seen on television. Hyungsuk Kim, who was a co-director for the group's sophomore album, was on keyboard leading the band.

After wrapping up Deliverance, the trio had planned on taking a break but, shortly after, "Meant to be" (Korean: 천생연분) climbed up the music charts almost forcing the group to shoot a music video and promote the single.

As a Korean R&B icon, Disney chose Solid to record a Korean version of All-4-one’s ‘Someday’ for the Hunchback of Notre Dame original soundtrack.

=== 1997: Solidate and hiatus ===
On April 24, 1997, Solid's fourth album, Solidate, was released by World Music. Attempting to differentiate their new album from the previous ones, they decided their single to be a dance number, "Birds of a feather flock together" (Korean: 끼리끼리). Keeping their R&B roots yet not losing their desire to expand their musicianship was imperative, which resulted in filling the album with more elaborate sounds and arrangements, some critics noted. Like their previous album, Kim and Lee wrote several tracks on this album presenting more concrete musical characters of individual member. Chong later stated in an interview that this album was the group's most commercialized album losing their primary focus for the group and musical direction with an incessant busy schedule. Album sale was relatively a success but, behind the scene, the trio was in much need of a break after working tirelessly without a break since "Holding the End of the Night" became a mega hit. Also it was reported that the constant conflict with the management company was present. In July, the trio began taking on an extensive break in the midst of much speculations to why the group was put to a halt at the height of their career. They went onto pursue each member's interests and careers. Kim remained in Korea pursuing to be a solo artist. Chong continued to be a music producer – what he already had been doing before forming Solid – expanding his influences abroad, in the Asian music scene mainly in Taiwan and the U.S. Lee went back to California to finish his undergraduate degree at University of Southern California.

=== 2018: Reunion and Into the Light ===
After twenty-one-year hiatus, Solid announced their long-awaited comeback on their official social media and billboards at subway stations in Seoul, Korea in early March. There have always been rumors while they were out of the spotlight that the trio would reunite indicating that the Korean audience has yet to forget the group. On March 16 and 17, 2018, album teasers for Into the Light and Memento were released respectively on their official YouTube channel.

On March 21, 2018, both press conference and album launch party with fans were held announcing their fifth studio album and concert dates, which were to be in May at Blue Square iMarket Hall, Seoul, Korea. Tickets were sold out within five minutes on March 22, 2018, prompting the group to add an additional day to thank their fans who have been eagerly waiting for their comeback for over two decades.

Into the Light was released on March 22, 2018, peaking at number 1 on iTunes R&B/Soul album chart in Korea and number 5 on iTunes K-pop album charts in both Korea and the U.S. Both fans and critics welcomed the album with rave reviews agreeing on the fact that the forward and progressive sound of Solid has been intact after such long hiatus as a group. Critics and prominent musicians, like Chulsoo Bae and Jinmo Im, praise the new chapter of Solid for again presenting the kind of sound that no K-pop acts have ever taken part of – seemingly always ahead of their peers, which has always been the characteristics and the musical direction of the group. The trio states that the group has been the musicians who have been striving for constant evolution of their sound unbounded by a musical genre.

May 18 through 20th, 2018, Solid began the second concert tour of their career, Into the Light, in Seoul, Korea with packed audiences with a guest appearance from an acclaimed Canadian beatboxer, KRNFX. The setlist spanned from their '90s hits to the tracks from the latest album, which was highly praised for presenting the right balance between nostalgia and the next chapter of the group.

== Discography ==
=== Studio albums ===
- Give Me a Chance (1993)
- The Magic of 8 Ball (1995)
- Light Camera Action! (1996)
- Solidate (1997)
- Into the Light (2018)

=== Live albums ===
- Solid Live (1996)

=== Compilation albums ===
- To Be Unlimited (2 Disc) (1999)

=== Albums as a featured artist ===
- "Who stepped on it" & "Right?" (Korean: 그지), Who stepped on it by Hyunchul Kim (1995)
- "It's time to love" (Korean: 사랑할 때가 왔어요), It will be late tomorrow: Environmental issues awareness concert album by various artists (1995)

=== Soundtracks ===
- "Someday" (Korean version: original performance by All-4-One), Disney the Hunchback of Notre Dame Original Soundtrack by various artists (1996)

== Concerts and tours ==
- Deliverance (1996)
- Into the Light (2018)

== Awards ==
- Golden Disc category, Korea Visual and Records Grand Prize Award (1995)
