= Aziatix =

American hip hop group

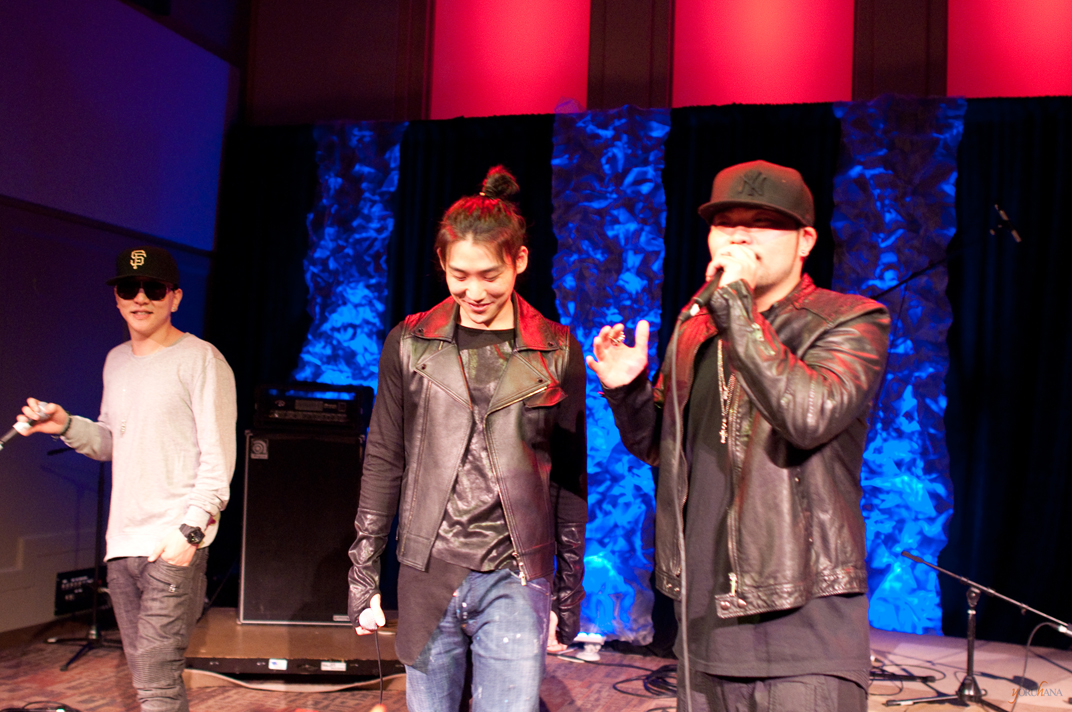
- Flowsik, Eddie, and Nicky in 2012

Background information
- Genres: Hip hop, R&B
- Years active: 2011–2015
- Labels: Astar, Inc. Cash Money Records
- Past members: Flowsik; Eddie Shin; Nicky Lee

Aziatix was a Korean–American hip hop and R&B trio consisting of members Flowsik, Eddie Shin, and Nicky Lee. The group, which was based in Seoul, South Korea, debuted in 2011 and won Best New Asian Artist at the Mnet Asian Music Awards later that year. In 2013, the group signed a lucrative contract with Cash Money Records, which was the largest record deal to date between a U.S. record label and a music act from Asia. The name of the group is a variation of the word "asiatic". Aziatix disbanded in 2015.

== Career ==
The members of Aziatix were brought together by record producer and former R&B singer Jae Chong. At the time of the group's formation, Flowsik was an established underground rapper in New York City, Eddie Shin was a student at NYU, and Nicky Lee was a successful Mandopop singer.

Aziatix released their first single, "Go," in March 2011 and their self-titled EP, Aziatix, in May 2011. In July, they released their first full-length album, Nocturnal, which charted in Taiwan and South Korea at numbers 14 and 35, respectively. At the end of the year, Aziatix won Best New Asian Artist at the 2011 Mnet Asian Music Awards.

In March 2012, the group performed at the U.S. music festival South by Southwest. In May, the group released their second EP, Awakening which again charted in Taiwan and South Korea, at numbers 11 and 32, respectively.

In 2013, Aziatix signed an 11.3 million USD record deal with Cash Money Records. It was the largest record deal to date between a U.S. record label and a music act from Asia. However, in December 2014, Aziatix announced on their Facebook page that they had decided to leave the record label.

Aziatix released their second and last album, Top of the World, in August 2015. The group then announced their indefinite hiatus via a statement released at the end of the music video of their title track which said: "Our journey that started in 2011 will be on hold for now. Due to the love and support from our fans worldwide, we hold great significance in all that we've done and will continue to do the best we can in every way despite our results. We thank all the Aziaddicts worldwide from the bottom of our hearts".

== Discography ==
=== Studio albums ===
Title	Album details	Peak positions			
Title	Album details	JPN	KOR	KOR Overseas	TWN East Asia
Nocturnal	Released: July 27, 2011; Re-released: January 18, 2012 (Japan Deluxe Edition); Label: Universal; Formats: CD, digital download	96	35	5	14
Top of the World	Released: August 25, 2015; Label: Astar Inc.; Formats: digital download	—	—	—	—
"—" denotes album did not chart or was not released in that region.

=== Extended plays ===
Title	Album details	Peak positions		
Title	Album details	KOR	KOR Overseas	TWN East Asia
Aziatix	Released: May 17, 2011; Label: Universal; Formats: Digital download	—	—	—
Awakening	Released: May 2, 2012; Label: Universal; Formats: CD, digital download	32	7	11
"—" denotes album did not chart or was not released in that region.

=== Singles ===
Title	Year	Peak chart positions	Album
Title	Year	KOR Overseas	Album
"Go"	2011	7	Aziatix / Nocturnal
"Cold"	2011	16	Aziatix / Nocturnal
"Slippin' Away"	2011	6	Nocturnal
"Be with You" (Rock Mix)	2011	22	Nocturnal
"Nothing Compares to You"	2012	54	Nocturnal (Japan Deluxe Edition)
"Speed of Light"	2012	72	Awakening
"Alright"	2012	14	Awakening
"Ready, Set, Go!"	2012	25	Non-album single

== Awards ==
Year	Award	Category	Nominated work	Result	Ref
2011	Mnet Asian Music Awards	Best New Asian Artist	—N/a	Won	
