= Bobby Sheng =

Taiwanese businessman (born 1972)

Bobby Sheng (Chinese: 盛保熙; pinyin: Sheng Bao Xi; born April 1972) is a Taiwanese-American businessman, entrepreneur and philanthropist who is the founder and Chairman of Bora Group and CEO of Bora Pharmaceuticals (保瑞藥業), currently the largest pharmaceutical company in Taiwan.

== Early life and education ==
Bobby Sheng grew up in Huntington Beach, California, in a family rooted in the pharmaceutical industry and entrepreneurship. His father owned a pharmaceutical company, Hoan Pharmaceuticals, in Taiwan, and during summers, Bobby worked in the company’s warehouse or office, fostering an early appreciation for the role of pharmaceuticals in improving lives. At his father's encouragement, he pursued economics at the University of California, Berkeley. However, while still in university, his father fell ill, and Bobby, at the age of 22, had to return to Taiwan to work in the family business.

== Career ==
=== Pharmaceutical Leadership ===
At Hoan, Bobby worked with family members and consultants to professionalize its structure, introducing an organizational chart and emphasizing corporate governance.

=== Ventures Beyond Pharma ===
While ensuring the company’s stability, Sheng explored ventures in other industries, including marketing, media, and technology. During the dot-com bubble, he gained experience in mergers and acquisitions by co-founding TheOne.com and then consolidating five tech companies into a single entity.

His passion for music led him to establish Machi Entertainment a digital-first record label in Asia with Taiwan entertainer Jeff Huang and Korean producer Jay Chong., Recognizing the growing demand for digital music amidst declining CD sales and rampant piracy, Sheng served as producer, financier, and executive.

=== Bora Pharmaceuticals ===
==== Global expansion in pharmaceuticals (2007-2017) ====
In 2007, Sheng shifted his focus back to the pharmaceuticals sector and founded Bora Pharmaceuticals, transitioning from pharmaceuticals distribution in Taiwan to Contract Development and Manufacturing Organization (CDMO) services.

To promote adaptation to changes among new recruits and investors, Sheng distributed copies of the business fable “Who Moved My Cheese?”. In 2013, Bora acquired its first manufacturing facility in Tainan, Taiwan, from the Japanese company Eisai, marking the start of its focus on contract drug development and production for international markets.

Bora Pharmaceuticals was listed on the Taipei Exchange in April 2017 and listed on the Taiwan Stock Exchange in 2023.

==== CDMO business expansion (2018-2022) ====
In 2018, Bora acquired a manufacturing site in Zhunan, Taiwan (formerly operated by Impax/Amneal). In 2020, Bora acquired a facility in Mississauga, Canada, from GSK. These acquisitions expanded Bora’s capabilities in small molecule CDMO operations and helped it gain presence in the North American market.

"International pharmaceutical companies are less likely to consider outsourcing orders to small manufacturers," analyzed Hui-Chin Tseng, Honorary Deputy Managing Partner at PwC Taiwan, who has been involved in the biotech industry. She explained that focusing on contract manufacturing has the advantage of providing stable revenue streams; however, to secure contracts, CDMO’s production capacity and scale must also align with international standards.

By 2022, Bora’s products were exported to over 100 countries.

==== Dual-engine growth Strategy (2022-present) ====
In 2022, Bora entered the large-molecule CDMO market with the establishment of Bora Biologics, following its acquisition of Eden Biologics.

In the same year, it acquired TWi Pharmaceuticals, a generics company based in Taiwan exporting to the US, gaining two oral solid dosage facilities, one ophthalmic manufacturing facility, and a portfolio of Abbreviated New Drug Application (ANDA) assets.

In November 2023, Bora Health, a subsidiary of Bora Pharmaceuticals, merged with SunWay Biotech. The transaction resulted in Bora Pharmaceuticals becoming the largest shareholder in SunWay Biotech and provided Bora Group with access to SunWay’s fermentation and extraction facilities, as well as research and analytical capabilities.

In 2024, Bora completed the acquisition of Upsher-Smith Laboratories and a Maryland-based sterile injectable facility (formerly Emergent BioSolutions). These acquisitions were intended to drive business and strengthen manufacturing and commercial footprint in the U.S.

In 2025, Bora completed a strategic investment in Tanvex to further develop its large-molecule CDMO business. Through a reverse merger, Tanvex took over Bora Biologics and re-pivoted its biosimilar business towards CDMO with a "Bora" rebrand.

As of 2024, Bora Pharmaceuticals had a portfolio of 96 commercial products and operates under a “dual-engine” model combining CDMO services and pharma sales.

The company has integrated sustainability into its governance and operations by linking part of executive pay to ESG metrics, establishing a Sustainability Committee in 2022, and setting annual goals. In 2025, it received the World Finance Sustainability Award.

== Philanthropy ==
Sheng has participated in initiatives supporting Taiwan's healthcare industry and biosciences talent. Since 2021, the company formed partnership with Taishin Healthcare Limited, a private equity fund focused on contract development and manufacturing organizations (CDMOs) and contract research organizations (CROs) aligned with emerging global trends.

In higher education, Sheng is a member of Berkeley’s Board of Trustees and a Builder of Berkeley. He also serves on the advisory board of the University of California, Berkeley College of Chemistry and established the Bora Wei-En Sheng Foundation, which supports education related to adolescent depression and anxiety.

He has spoken at events including the Stanford "Innovate Taiwan" Conference, the Biotech EMBA program at Taipei Medical University, and multiple BIO-Asia conferences.
