= Johan Kim =

Korean American musician (born 1973)

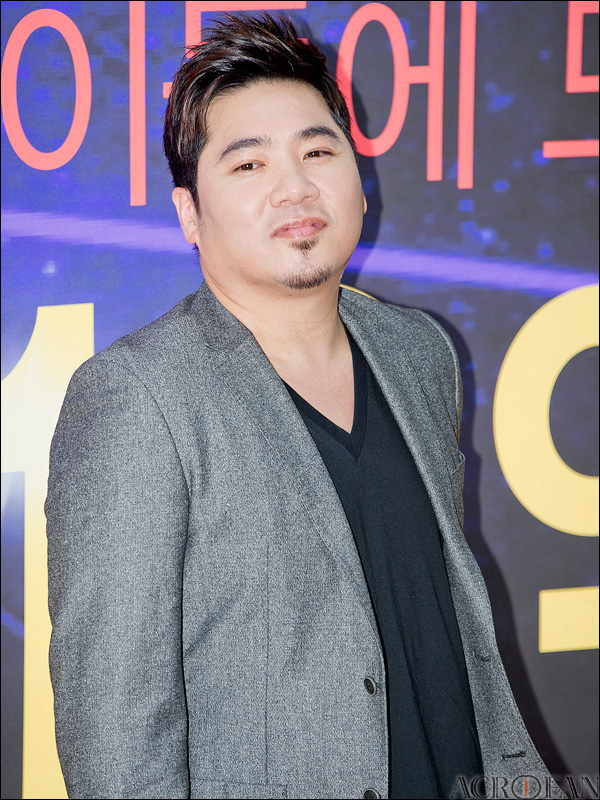

Background information
- Born: George Han Kim; March 27, 1973 (age 53); Atlanta, Georgia, United States
- Genres: K-pop, R&B, Soul
- Occupations: Singer, record producer, song writer
- Instrument: Vocals
- Years active: 1993–present
- Label: Soul Family Production

- Johan Kim
- Hangul: 김조한
- RR: Gim Johan
- MR: Kim Chohan

George Han Kim (born March 27, 1973), better known by his Korean name, Johan Kim (Korean: 김조한), is a Korean-American singer and record producer. He is a member of South Korean R&B/hip hop trio Solid. His song "I Want To Fall In Love" has become a mega-hit throughout the country of South Korea. He founded the girl group Unicorn.

== Early life ==
Kim was born in Atlanta, Georgia, and moved to Los Angeles in 1986.

== Career ==
In 1993, he debuted as a member of Solid (솔리드), a South Korean R&B group that pioneered the genre in the 1990s with chart topping hits in Korea. He was the lead vocalist of the trio. After the group separated in July 1997 to take a break from incessant schedule, Kim stayed in South Korea to continue as a solo musician. After 21-year hiatus, Solid reunited in March 2018, not only releasing their fifth studio album, but also announced concert dates in May. Kim served as an agent for the Netflix animation film K-Pop Demon Hunters, recruited singers to play Abby Saja's and Romance Saja's roles in the film. He also served as vocal training for these singers.

== Discography ==
=== Studio albums ===
Title	Album details	Peak chart positions		Sales
Title	Album details	KOR MIAK	KOR Circle	Sales
Kim Jo Han	Released: July 10, 1998; Label: Shinchon Music; Formats: CD, cassette	44	—N/a	KOR: 62,559
Kim Jo Han Vol. 2 (김조한 2집)	Released: August 18, 1999; Label: Jaks Media; Formats: CD, cassette	12	—N/a	KOR: 34,440
2gether 4ever	Released: January 26, 2001; Label: Ace; Formats: CD, cassette	19	—N/a	KOR: 64,332
Me, Myself, My Music	Released: April 12, 2005; Label: Lime Music; Formats: CD, cassette	12	—N/a	KOR: 12,642
Soul Family With Johan	Released: October 25, 2007; Label: K&Music; Formats: CD	33	—N/a	KOR: 2,847
Once In A Lifetime	Released: November 12, 2015; Label: Soul Family Production; Formats: CD, digital download	—N/a	45	

=== Reissues ===
- 2016: 'Forgetting to Forget` Kim Johan 6th album `Once in a lifetime` Repackage (이별은 잊은듯이)

=== Best albums ===
- 2000: Kim Jo Han Best (김조한 베스트)

=== Live albums ===
- 2001: Contact (with Fly to the Sky)

== Filmography ==
=== Television shows ===
Year	Title	Network	Role	Notes	Ref.
2021	Overseas Korean Song Festival	MBN	judge		
