= Jae Chong =

South Korean–American musician (born 1972)

- Born: January 8, 1972 (age 54); Seoul, South Korea
- Origin: Los Angeles, California, U.S.
- Occupations: Songwriter; record producer; musician
- Member of: Solid

Korean name
- Hangul: 정재윤
- RR: Jeong Jaeyun
- MR: Chŏng Chaeyun

Jae Chong is a South Korean–American record producer, songwriter, and musician. He is best known for his work as producer of L.A. Boyz, Stanley Huang, Coco Lee, Aziatix, Royal Pirates and as a member of the band Solid.

== Career ==
Chong's professional music career started in Los Angeles during the early 1990s, producing local rap groups such as Baby G, The Funky Few, and Soul Selection. He is one of the three members of the group, Solid as well as the writer and producer. It was the first R&B group in South Korea with record sales exceeding 4 million. Chong then shifted his focus to the Asian music scene by writing and producing songs for various artists in Asia. He went on to write and produce for many international artists like Coco Lee, Kim Gun-mo, Shin Seung-hun, Stanley Huang and L.A. Boyz.

In 2003 he took part in launching the first hip hop entertainment company in Taiwan, MACHI Entertainment. He was the first Korean American to be nominated for the Best Producer of the Year at the Golden Melody Awards and won various awards for albums, two of which were Stanley Huang and Nicky Lee who won the Best Male Artist of the Year award at the 2005 and 2006 Golden Melody Awards respectively. In 2010, he helped coordinate the collaboration project between JYJ, Kanye West, and Rodney Jerkins.

In 2011, he founded the hip-hop/R&B group Aziatix.

== Discography ==
- Coco Lee (International) – Top-selling international female artist in Asia and the United States
  - Singles "Love You If I Want", “Still In Love With You" on her Sincere Album (1997)
  - Single "We Can Dance" (sample contains Carl Carlton’s She's a Bad Mama Jama (She's Built, She's Stacked)) on her Today Forever album (1999)
  - Single "So Crazy”, "Let Go", "I’m Still In Love", and "Final Countdown" on her Promise album (2001)
  - Composed and produced song "BYOB", "Ready or Not" (2009)
  - Produced the song "Maybe" (2009)
- Vanness Wu (Asia) – Member of the band F4
  - Composed and produced the song "Nah Geuh Neu Tsun"
  - Vanness Wu 2nd album (2006); Composed and produced 8 songs.
  - Composed and produced the song "It’s Ya Girl" for his Japanese EP (2009)
- Shin Seung-hun (Korea) – Top Selling ballad singer of all time in Korea
  - "Goodbye" on 7th album (2000) (Sold 1 million)
- BoA (Asia) – International Asian star; dominating both the Korean and Japanese Charts
  - Composed and produced "Let U Go" on her second album (1999)
- A-mei (Taiwan) – The most successful female pop singer of Taiwan
  - Composed and produced the singles "Wu Tzu Wei" and "Jah Shing Shing" on her 2003 release.
- B Real (USA)
  - Composed and produced the song "Garden of Paradise" (2006) for the movie Splinter
- Li Bingbing (China/Asia)
  - Composed and produced the song "Yu Gan" (2009); opening song for the movie The Forbidden Kingdom
- Jane Zhang (China/Asia)
  - Composed and produced the song "Hero" (2008); end credit song for the movie The Forbidden Kingdom
- Bibi (China)
  - Composed and produced the song "Deserted Island" (2007)
- J (Korea) – Female R&B artist in Korea firmly entrenched in the top of the charts
  - Composed and produced Singles "Scent of You" and "Tonight" on her debut album.
- Stanley Huang (Taiwan)
  - First debut album (2000) produced and written 9 songs including singles "Remember Me" and "Cold Shower"
  - Second album (2001) produced and written 7 tracks including the singles "Circus Monkey", "I Need A Holiday", and "Show Me Your Demons"
  - Third album (2002) produced/written/co‐written the entire album.
  - Fourth album (2004) produced/written/co‐written the entire album. (Nominated for the Golden Melody Awards for the Best Album of the Year; Stanley Huang won the award for the Best Male Artist of the Year)
  - Fifth album (2006) produced/written/co‐written the entire album.
  - Sixth album (2007) produced/written/co‐written the entire album.
  - Seventh album (2008) produced/written/co‐written the entire album. (Two nominations for the Golden Melody Awards 2009 for Best Album and Best Producer of the Year)
- Nicky Lee (Taiwan/China)
  - Composed and produced five albums (Nicky won the award for the Best Male Artist of the Year in 2007)
- Kim Gun-mo (Korea) – One of the most successful artists in Korean history, featured in the Guinness Book of World Records for most records sold relative to population
  - "Nightmares" on fourth album Exchange (1997) (Sold 2 million)
  - "Chameleon" on fifth album Myself (1998) (Sold 1.7 million)
  - "Happy Days" on sixth album Growing (1999) (Sold 1.5 million)
- Solid (Korea) – All produced/written/performed by Jae Chong
  - Second album (1995) ‐ (first R&B album to sell over million copies in Korea)
  - Third album (1996) ‐ (one million sold)
  - Fourth album (1997) ‐ (700,000 sold)
- Jolin Tsai (Taiwan) – An idol star with one of the largest followings in Asia
  - Composed and produced the song "Baby Face" on her third album Show Your Love (2000)
  - Composed and produced the song "Surprise" on her fourth album Lucky Number (2001)
  - Arranged the song "Nice Guy" on her eighth album Dancing Diva (2006)
- Elva Hsiao (Taiwan)
  - Composed and produced first hit single "Cappuccino" on her debut album. (First #1 song produced by a foreign producer) (1999)
  - "Weather Outside" and "Do You Know?" on her second album (2000); "Weather Outside" was used for a commercial campaign for the De Beers jewelry company
  - Produced four tracks on her 3rd album (2001) including the international hit "The One"
  - Single "Come Closer to Me" on her 4th album (2001) plus remixed the song "And I Know"
  - Composed and produced the single "Wanna Lover" on her fifty album (2003)
  - Composed and produced the single "L.O.V.E" (2006).
  - Composed and produced the single "Cha Cha" (2008)
  - Produced the songs "What Do U Think" and "Worth It" (2009)
- Momoko Tao (Taiwan)
  - Composed and produced Single "Dreamin" on her latest album Momoko (2001) used on Momoko 2001 Create Collection Fashion Show.
- Park Mi-kyung (Korea) – One of the biggest female artists in Korea
  - Composed and produced 5 tracks on her 4th album (1999) including her singles "Faithful" and "Different Love"
- L.A. Boyz (Taiwan) – One of the top selling Pop Group in Taiwanese music history
  - 12 albums (1992–1997)
- Chae Jung-an (Korea)
  - Composed and produced the hit single "Precious Love" on her second album (2001)
- VOICE (Korea) – R&B Group
  - Composed and produced all 10 songs on their debut release including the hit single "Your Angel".
- Uhm Jung-hwa (Korea) – The biggest female artist in Korea
  - Produced/Co‐written her smash hit single "Hidden Pictures" on her 4th album (1998) (500,000+ sold)
  - Produced/Written "Tell Me" on her 5th album (1999)
- Ryu Si-won (Korea) – Korean actor and singer
  - Composed and produced his debut album "Change" (1995)
- Kang Susie (Korea)
  - Composed and produced the song 'hopeless lovers' on her sixth Album (1995)
- MACHI (Taiwan) – 1st real Hip Hop group ever to achieve commercial success in Taiwan
  - Composed & produced both first and the third album. (2003–2005) including the remix of "Work It" by Missy Elliott.
- Andrew Chou (Taiwan) – the youngest entertainer ever to achieve commercial success
  - Composed & produced 8 tracks on the 1st album including the hit single "Pi Li Pa Lah"
  - Composed & produced 2 tracks on the 2nd album
- Melody Yeung (Taiwan)
  - Composed and produced the single "The Perfect Pair" (2008)
- Tension (Taiwan)
  - Composed & arranged the song "I Need U So Bad" on their album Gotta Be Your Man (2003)
- Sandy Lam (Hong Kong)
  - Composed and arranged the songs "Now or Never" (2000) and “You Can’t Have It Back" (2001)
- Ding Dang (Taiwan)
  - Composed and produced the single "Night Cat" (2009)
- Suki Low (Malaysia)
  - Composed & produced the songs "Without U", "Ladies' Night", and "Walk Away" (2009)
- JYJ (Korea, United States)
  - Wrote, arranged and produced the song "Be the One" on The Beginning (2010)
- Alien Huang (Taiwan)
  - Composed the songs "They Are Like Us" (2015)
