= L.A. Boyz =

Taiwanese hip hop group

- Occupations: Rappers, Singers
- Years active: 1991–1997
- Musical career
- Genres: Hip-hop, techno, big beat, new jack swing
- Labels: Pony Canyon Records (Taiwan), UFO (Taiwan), Sony BMG
- Past members: Jeffrey Huang; Stanley Huang; Steven Lin

L.A. Boyz was a Taiwanese pop/rap group composed of brothers Jeff Huang (黃立成, Huang Licheng) and Stanley Huang (黃立行, Huang Lixing), and their cousin Steven Lin (林智文) formed circa 1991. They are considered to be the first rap group in Taiwanese popular music. They released 13 albums (including 3 compilation albums) starting from their first "SHIAM! 閃" in 1992.

== Background ==
The trio were brought up in Irvine, California and met at its University High School. They first became involved in music through their interest in hip-hop dance moves learnt from parties around Orange County and Los Angeles, and fashion from Compton and South-Central LA. Their dancing, and entry into various competitions, eventually led them to be scouted by a representative of Pony Canyon Records, Taiwan.

== Career ==
=== Breakthrough ===
L.A. Boyz received their "big break ... with the demise of the Little Tigers, a cutesy group that ruled the Taiwan pop scene until one of their members got drafted." Their distinct sound and use of American slang propelled them to quick success, selling more than 130,000 copies of their first record Shiam. Their second album, released in the same year, was similarly received.

=== Image and style ===
The L.A. Boyz style was a combination of the "youthful, innocent" look prevalent in Taiwanese pop at the time and a "great stage gimmick" in their dancing. They were perceived as an appealing hybrid of American and Taiwanese backgrounds. As Steven Lin noted in an interview with the LA Times in 1993, the perception Taiwanese youth had of Los Angeles as a symbol of modern America led them to choose their name (though only one of their members was from the city itself). Their music videos depict their unique style of synchronized breakdancing in clubs and concert halls and various urban environments. Shots of Kung-fu, Chinese New Year Dragons and baseball also feature.

=== Musical style ===
LA Boyz' music was influenced by a wide variety of pop and dance music. In their songs they make prominent references to new jack swing and Bobby Brown as well as techno and rap. A good example of their musical diversity is the song "Ya!", which features sampled breakbeats and vocals stings (such as "yeah, uh-huh", "give me a big beat!", "drop the mid-range, drop the bass"). It features transitions in tempo, a semitone key modulation, a Glissando synthesizer line, and a hip-hop section. Their song "I Like It" is a reinterpretation of the disco band KC and the Sunshine Band song "That's the Way (I Like It)" in a hip-hop style. Despite being known for their rapping, "two-thirds of their music is actually a mixture of fast-paced dance-pop and slower, romantic R&B numbers."
Their lyrical content include finance, their own rapping and dancing skills, American recording artists and genres (as mentioned above), American cartoons (e.g. The Hulk) and romantic love. Their lyrics reference and reflect to their hybrid nationality, an example from their song "Jump" – which was an eerily similar clone to Kriss Kross's hit song "Jump", imitating their beats, rhythms, and melodies. LA Boyz' song had a first verse – "Jerry's gonna make his rap funky in Chinese/ First you gotta start off with the ABCs (American-born Chinese) / Then you gotta learn it like the Taiwanese" – is followed closely by a reference to the American pop-cultural icon Superman. They also tone down the violent themes and difficult-to-understand slang in the lyrics for it to suit a Chinese-speaking audience. They also sought to identify their local Taiwanese audience (despite having audience in Korea, Japan and Mainland China) by speaking with a strong Taiwanese accent and re-releasing some songs in Hokkien.

=== Break Up ===
The band's members all worked in film and production of other Taiwanese artists' albums. Despite their success garnering recognition in Singapore's Billboard Awards Best Performance Group category, Hong Kong Billboard Awards Best New Artist category and at Taiwan's own Golden Melody Awards the group eventually split. Jeff Huang returned to the United States and started an internet company that later merged with a Japanese software company in a 60 million dollar deal before once again returning to Taiwan and fronting hip-hop group Machi; brother Stanley went on to establish a successful solo career, winning Best Mandarin Male Singer in the 2005 Golden Melody Awards; and Lin currently works as an orthopedic surgeon in California while still participating in music and film. In 2023, Jeff [who was 50 years old at the time] made headlines in Taiwan for dating 19 year old model Alina Zhytielieva.

== Members ==
Jeffrey Huang

- Chinese Name: 黃立成, Huang Licheng
- 7 November 1972 (age 53)
  Huwei Township, Taiwan
- Occupation: Vocalist for Machi

Machi Big Brother X account

Stanley Huang

- Chinese Name: 黃立行, Huang Lixing
- 21 September 1975 (age 51)
  Taipei, Taiwan
- Occupation: Solo artist

Steven Lin

- Chinese Name: 林智文, Lin Ziwun
- 15 April 1976 (age 50)
  Los Angeles, California, United States
- Occupation: Resident doctor & actor

Steven Lin Artist Webpage Steven Lin blog

== Discography ==
=== Studio albums ===
==== SHIAM! 閃 ====
Label: Pony Canyon Records (Taiwan)
Producer: Wang Chi-ping
Track Listing:
1.閃 Go Posse
2.愛我好嗎 Won't You Be My Girl?
3.別客氣 Don't Say You're ⽍歹勢 (Taiwanese)
4.來電吧 Dial My Number
5.怎可能 Unbelievable
6.好兄弟 Buddy Buddy
7.緣投困仔 Lover's Boy (Taiwanese)
8.飛越地平線 Drive & Fly
9.夜魔 Devil's Candy
10.夏天 Summer Vacation

==== Jump 跳 ====
Label: Pony Canyon Records (Taiwan)
Producer: Wang Chi-ping
Track Listing:
1.跳 Jump
2.季節的歌 Merry Christmas
3.東方不賴 Oriental Mystery
4.愛難纏 Love Is A Weird Thing
5.神魂顛倒 Head Over Heels
6.心碎洛城 LA Heartbreak
7.落雨的晚上 Raining Night
8.城市之間 Between Two Cities
9.妳說妳會想我 Say You Gonna Miss Me
10.最後一⽀支慢舞 The Last Dance
11.閃(Remix) Go Posse (Remix)

==== Ya!/야! ====
Label: Pony Canyon Records (Taiwan)
Producer: Wang Chi-ping
Track Listing:
1.Baseball, O-Lay!! (English)
2.Baby Come To Me (Taiwanese)
3.還記得去年夏天
4.跳舞星球
5.Who's Got The Soul (English)
6. YA! (English)
7. My Love Just For You
8.擁有我已經⾜夠
9. Everybody, Everywhere
10.思念是最短的距離

==== That's The Way ====
Label: Pony Canyon Records (Taiwan)
Producer: Wang Chi-ping
Track Listing:
1. That's The Way
2.交換禮物 My Gift To You
3.邀你⼊入夢 Invitation To My Dream
4.迷惑 Dazzled
5.墜⼊入情網 Falling In Love
6.⾦金思頓的夢想 Dream of A Kingston Mon
7.愛你 我的⼼心 Love You, With All My Heart
8.新捷克搖擺 New Jack Swing
9.天亮以前 擁抱以後 Before Dawn, After Embrace
10.Yabbadabbadoo (English)

==== FANTASY ====
Label: UFO (Taiwan)
Producer: Wang Chi-ping
Track Listing:
1.Fantasy2.試著去愛(Can We Try)
3.秘密約會
4.愛就是所有(Love Is The Answer)
5.Creeping Up A G Sound (English)
6.夏⽇戀曲(Island Girl)
7.狂戀
8.浪漫的假期
9.因為愛你
10.Funky As I Wanna Be (English)

==== Phat ====
Label: UFO (Taiwan)
Producer: Wang Chi-ping
Track Listing:
1.瘋狂聖誕 Phat X'mas (English)
2.最溫暖的祝福 Best Wishes
3.舞林⼤大會 Casualty Of The Dance War (English)
4.快樂新世界 Happy New World
5.給你我的愛 I Want Your Love
6.Crazy⼀一點有什麼不好 Crazy Is All Right
7.你讓我寂寞 You Make Me Lonely (English)
8.愛如何開⼝口 It's Hard To Say I Love You (English)
9.跟你說再⾒見 Rage Against The Dark (English)
10.天使的笑 Angel's Smile

==== Young Guns ====
Label: UFO (Taiwan)
Producer: Wang Chi-ping
Track Listing:
1.Young Guns
2.危險⼈人物
3. Another Lonely Night
4.飛夢天堂
5. L.A. People 6.摩登共和國
7.所謂的愛
8.你的⼼心裏可有我
9.⿊黑⽩白講 (Taiwanese)
10.Good-bye Girl (Taiwanese)

==== R.O.C.K ====
Label: UFO (Taiwan)
Producer: Wang Chi-ping
Track Listing:
1. ROCK
2. Drummer Boy
3. 愛讓我愉快
4. Man Of The Night
5. 浪漫Christmas
6. 懷念的平安夜Christmas Without You
7. Lucky Star
8. 眼裏的愛Listen To The Love In My Eyes
9. L.A. Rap Rock
10. Heaven Help Me

==== Pure Energy ====
Label: UFO (Taiwan)
Producer: Wang Chi-ping
Track Listing:
1.Solar
2.Pure Energy
3.Real Man
4.懸賞愛情
5.⼩小丑和汽
6.I Like It
7.越洋電話
8.Sweet Baby Jessica
9.地球歌

==== 冒險 ====
Label: UFO (Taiwan)
Producer: Wang Chi-ping
Track Listing:
1.Say Hello To The World
2.速⻝⾷食男⼥女
3.Chill
4.成全我愛你
5.⼼心如往常
6.遊戲
7.Jungle Boogie
8.強酸
9.語無倫次
10.Last Dance
11.Sun Sun Baby

=== Compilations ===
==== 精選集-跳乎伊爽 ====
Label: UFO (Taiwan)
Track Listing:
1.跳乎伊爽!CLUB-ZOO-MIX (組曲)
2.閃 GO POSSE
3.跳 JUMP
4.⼼心碎洛城 L.A. HEART BREAK
5.交換禮物 MY GIFT TO YOU
6.棒!Baseball, o-lay!
7.⾦金斯頓的夢想 Dream Of A Kingston Mon
8. YA
9. BABY COME TO ME
10.季節的歌 Merry Christmas

==== 精選集-跟你說再⾒見 ====
Label: UFO (Taiwan)
Track Listing:
1.阿嬤的台語歌
2.浪漫的假期 (Korean Version)
3.Crazy⼀一點有什麼不好 Crazy Is All Right
4.夏⽇日戀曲 Island Girl
5.跟你說再⾒見 Rage Against The Dark
6. Fantasy
7.瘋狂聖誕 Phat X'mas
8.試者去愛 Can We Try
9.舞林⼤大會 Casualty Of The Dance War

==== L.A.Boyz Very Much全紀錄唯⼀一精選 ====
Label: Sony BMG
Track Listing:
Disc 1
01.閃
02.BASEBALL O-LAY棒!!
03.⾦金斯頓的夢想
04.夏天
05.Young Guns
06.好兄弟
07.R.O.C.K.
08.速⻝⾷食男⼥女
09.季節的歌
10.My Love Just For You
Disc 2
01.跳
02.THAT’S THE WAY
03.PURE ENERGY
04.⼼心碎洛城
05.DRUMMER BOY
06.REAL MAN
07.YABBADABADOO
08.落⾬雨的晚上
09.愛我好嗎
10.BABY COME TO ME

== See also ==
- Machi
