= Steven Lin =

Taiwanese-American classical pianist

Steven Lin (Chinese: 林易) is a Taiwanese American classical pianist. Described by the New York Times for playing that is “...immaculately voiced and enhanced by admirable subtleties of shading and dynamics.” Lin has been awarded in several international piano competitions including the top prize winner of the Arthur Rubinstein International Piano Master Competition in 2014, 3rd prize at the 2012 William Kapell International Competition, the 1st prize at the 2012 Juilliard School's Gina Bachauer Piano Scholarship Competition and the International Tang Dynasty Piano Competition in New York in 2008. He performed with such orchestras as Kansas City Symphony, Fort Worth Symphony Orchestra, National Symphony Orchestra of Mexico, Western Australian Symphony Orchestra, Indianapolis Symphony Orchestra, Costa Rica National Symphony, Israel Philharmonic Orchestra, San Diego Symphony Orchestra, and Baltimore Symphony.

Lin attended The Juilliard School from the age of ten, and studied with Yoheved Kaplinsky.

During 2018–19, Lin's debuted across the Middle East in Dubai and Bahrain Spring Festival. He has frequently appeared in several summer festivals.
