= Nicky Lee (singer) =

American singer and actor (born 1980)

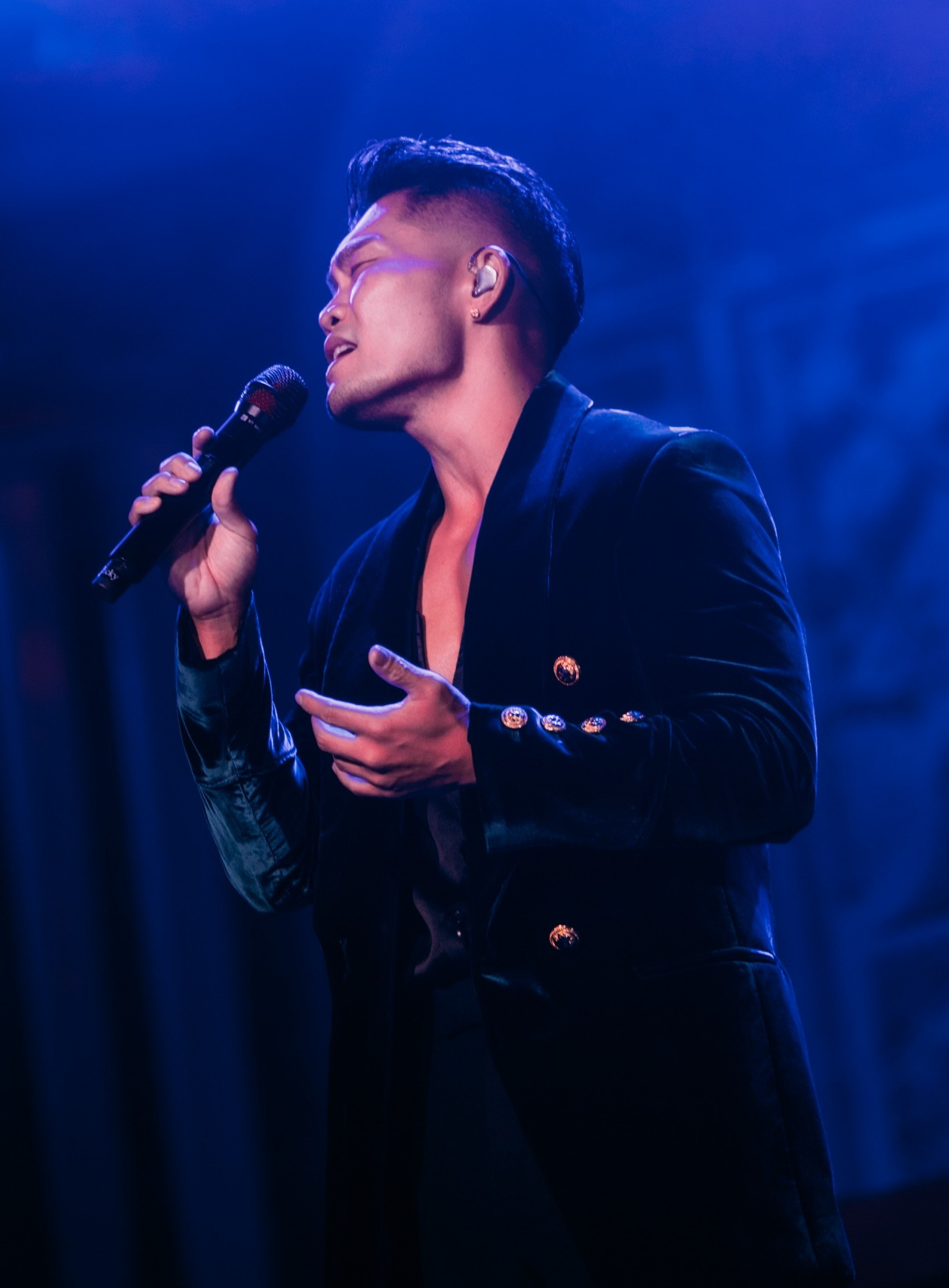
- Lee performing in Kaohsiung in 2022
- Born: November 26, 1980 (age 45); Los Angeles, California, U.S.
- Other names: Neil Keyz; Saint; Li Jiuzhe
- Education: Long Beach City College
- Occupations: Singer, actor
- Spouse: Akane Sōma (m. 2014)
- Musical career
- Genres: Mandopop, R&B, hip hop
- Instruments: Vocals
- Years active: 1998—present
- Labels: Warner Music Taiwan (2005-2010); Asia Muse (2010-2011); Unicorn Entertainment (2017-present)

Nicky Lee (born November 26, 1980) is an American singer and actor based in Taiwan.

== Early life and career ==
Born and raised in Los Angeles, California, Lee gained his initial fame as part of the Taiwanese hip hop group, Machi. Following the success of Machi, Lee released his first full-length Mandarin solo album, Shadow, in 2005. In 2007, Lee was named Best Mandarin Male Singer at the 18th Golden Melody Awards. He is also known for his work with music group Aziatix.

== Personal life ==
He married Japanese television personality Akane Sōma in 2014.

== Discography ==
=== Studio albums ===
Title	Album details	Notes
The Genesis (1집)	Released: December 1998; Formats: CD	As Korean band Voice
Journey (여정)	Released: February 2002; Formats: CD	Released under the stage name Saint (세인트)
Shadow (影子)	Released: April 22, 2005; Label: Warner Music Taiwan; Formats: CD, digital download	Debut Mandarin album
Baby It's Me (Baby 是我)	Released: April 28, 2006; Label: Warner Music Taiwan; Formats: CD, digital download	
Think Too Much (想太多)	Released: October 12, 2007; Label: Warner Music Taiwan; Formats: CD, digital download	
Not...Perfect (不，完美)	Released: August 22, 2008; Label: Warner Music Taiwan; Formats: CD, digital download	
Nice Nicky (好玖)	Released: September 17, 2010; Label: Warner Music Taiwan; Formats: CD, digital download	
Will You Remember	Released: December 15, 2017; Label: Harvest International Media; Formats: CD, digital download	

=== Singles ===
Year	Title	Notes
2005	"Horizon (Deep Sink Piano Version)"	Devil 2005 soundtrack
2005	"Horizon (Guitar Version)"	Devil 2005 soundtrack
2005	"Horizon"	Devil 2005 soundtrack
2006	"So So"	As featured artist Collaboration with Vivian Hsu
2008	"Premonition"	Collaboration with Li Bingbing, The Forbidden Kingdom soundtrack
2010	"Making Love Out of Nothing at All"	Monga soundtrack
2014	"A Wonderful Day"	Collaboration with Chiago Liu
2018	"Secrets [人際關係事務所] 插曲"	Befriend soundtrack

== Filmography ==
=== Television series ===
Year	English title	Original title	Role	Notes
2008	Pretty Ugly	原來我不帥	Jin Sisi	
2009	Love 18	逆風18	Nicky	

=== Film ===
Year	English title	Original title	Role	Notes
2008	Madagascar: Escape 2 Africa	—N/a	Moto Moto the hippopotamus	Mandarin dub
2009	Mulan	花木蘭	Hu Kui	
2013	Machi Action	變身	Kindergarten teacher	Special appearance
2017	The Missing	綁架者	Zhao Daqi	

== Awards and nominations ==
Year	Award	Category	Nominated work	Result
2007	18th Golden Melody Awards	Best Mandarin Male Singer	Baby It's Me	Won
2018	29th Golden Melody Awards	Best Mandarin Male Singer	Will You Remember	Nominated
2021	26th Star Awards Ceremony	Best Theme Song	All is Well - Singapore (人间失格)	Nominated
