= List of China's Next Top Model contestants =

This is a list of contestants who have appeared on the Chinese television show China's Next Top Model. Contestants compete against each other to become the China's Next Top Model. They are judged by models Li Ai (for cycles 1, 2 and 3), Shang Wenjie (for cycle 4), Lynn Hung & Zhang Liang (for cycle 5-present) and their panel of judges, and win a modeling contract with a top modeling agency and along with other prizes. The series first aired in 2008 and as of 2015, there have been five cycles. A total of 60 different participants have been selected as finalists in the show in its eight years running, with 5 models crowned as "China's Next Top Model".

== Contestants ==
Name	Age	Hometown	Cycle	Finish
Liu Wen Jing	26	Chongqing	Cycle 1	10th (quit)
Bao Jie	21	Anhui	Cycle 1	9th
Zhang Xiao Pei	20	Shanghai	Cycle 1	8th
Tanya Zy	28	Taipei	Cycle 1	7th
Wu Mei Ting	21	Guangzhou	Cycle 1	6th
Ma Shu-Yi	21	Guangzhou	Cycle 1	5th
Zhu Feng	19	Shanghai	Cycle 1	4th (quit)
Yan Xue Qian	19	Shanghai	Cycle 1	3rd
Wang Jia	21	Harbin	Cycle 1	Runner-Up
Yin Ge	21	Changsha	Cycle 1	Winner
Zhang Cai	18	Yichang	Cycle 2	10th
Li Muo	21	Shandong	Cycle 2	9th
Hu Lu Lu	25	Sichuan	Cycle 2	8th
Tan Jie	19	Chongqing	Cycle 2	7th
Lily Anna	24	Macau	Cycle 2	6th
Zhang Yang	21	Jilin	Cycle 2	5th
Wang Shan	22	Liaoning	Cycle 2	4th
He Xin	19	Heilongjiang	Cycle 2	3rd
Mo Jia Qi	23	Shandong	Cycle 2	Runner-Up
Meng Yao	21	Harbin	Cycle 2	Winner
Zhu Yan	23	Shanghai	Cycle 3	10th
Sun Yue	21	Shandong	Cycle 3	9th
Zhao Yi Fei	19	Liaoning	Cycle 3	8th (quit)
Shi Yu	20	Sichuan	Cycle 3	7th
Chao Chang Yi Lan	19	Wuhan	Cycle 3	6th
Zhu Yue	18	Nanjing	Cycle 3	5th
Huang Qi	20	Changsha	Cycle 3	4th
Wang Sheng Jie	21	Shandong	Cycle 3	3rd
Lin Jia Yi	20	Guangzhou	Cycle 3	Runner-Up
Mao Chu Yu	18	Sichuan	Cycle 3	Winner
Chen Qi	25	—N/a	Cycle 4	14th/13th
Yin Fang Bing	21	—N/a	Cycle 4	14th/13th
Chia Fan	28	—N/a	Cycle 4	12th
Chen Chan Lin	19	—N/a	Cycle 4	11th
Zong Yi Tong	22	—N/a	Cycle 4	10th
Dong Zhu Xi	20	—N/a	Cycle 4	9th (quit)
Wang Xiao Ting	21	—N/a	Cycle 4	8th
Shi Xin Ling	17	—N/a	Cycle 4	7th
Li Qiao Dan	24	—N/a	Cycle 4	6th
Zhuo Chen Lan	25	—N/a	Cycle 4	5th
Xie Shu Ya	19	—N/a	Cycle 4	4th
Hu Huan	26	—N/a	Cycle 4	3rd
Yu An Qi	22	—N/a	Cycle 4	Runner-Up
Wang Xiao Qian	21	—N/a	Cycle 4	Winner
Lai Yu Ting	22	Taipei	Cycle 5	16th/15th
Jiang Ying	33	Shanghai	Cycle 5	16th/15th
Ha Sheng	31	Taipei	Cycle 5	14th
Xu Meng Ting	18	Shanghai	Cycle 5	13th
Huang Zhen Zhen	20	Chengdu	Cycle 5	12th
Yu Ling Yun	26	Shanghai	Cycle 5	11th
Wang Meng	22	Shanghai	Cycle 5	10th
Teng Tian Long	25	Chongqing	Cycle 5	9th
Yi Chen	20	Xuzhou	Cycle 5	8th
Zhao Zhuo Nun	23	Wuxi	Cycle 5	7th
Huang Si Qi	18	Hohhot	Cycle 5	6th
Li Hao Ting	20	Huizhou	Cycle 5	5th
Liu Xian Xia	18	Tianjin	Cycle 5	4th
Wang Ren Chuan	19	Dalian	Cycle 5	3rd
Li Xue	24	Huangpu	Cycle 5	Runner-up
Li Si Jia	21	Harbin	Cycle 5	Winner

== Notes ==
^1 Contestant's ages are at the time of the season's filming.
