= I Supermodel season 1 =

I Supermodel
- Season 1
- Season 1 cast
- No. of episodes: 12

Release
- Original network: iQiyi
- Original release: March 21 – June 6, 2015

Season chronology
- Next → Season 2

I Supermodel 1 is the first season of the Chinese reality show and modeling competition of the same name. Filming for the show took place in Melbourne, Australia. The show featured 14 contestants in the final cast and began to air on television on March 21, 2015. The winner of the competition was 26-year-old Kang Qian Wen, better known professionally as Kiki Kang.

== Contestants ==
(ages stated are at time of contest)

Contestant		Age	Height	Team	Finish	Rank
刘雁红	Liu Yan Hong	20	1.75 m (5 ft 9 in)	Qi Qi	Episode 2	14
郑诗慧	Zheng Shi Hui	23	1.75 m (5 ft 9 in)	Jin Xing	Episode 4	13
钟鹿纯	Zhong Lu Chun	25	1.78 m (5 ft 10 in)	Qi Qi	Episode 5	12 (quit)
蔡慧	Cai Hui	28	1.74 m (5 ft 8 1/2 in)	Jin Xing	Episode 5	11
崔楠	"Linda" Cui Nan	26	1.78 m (5 ft 10 in)	Jin Xing	Episode 6	10
董蕾	Dong Lei	20	1.83 m (6 ft 0 in)	Jin Xing	Episode 7	9
杨朵兰	Yang Duo Lan	24	1.78 m (5 ft 10 in)	Qi Qi	Episode 8	8-7
任睿	Ren Rui	19	1.80 m (5 ft 11 in)	Qi Qi	Episode 8	8-7
张昊玥	Zhang Hao Yue	20	1.76 m (5 ft 9 1/2 in)	Qi Qi	Episode 9	6
顾艾嘉	Gu Ai Jia	20	1.79 m (5 ft 10 1/2 in)	Jin Xing	Episode 10	5
陈曦	Chen Xi	19	1.80 m (5 ft 11 in)	Jin Xing	Episode 11	4
姚雪飞	Yao Xue Fei	23	1.78 m (5 ft 10 in)	Jin Xing	Episode 12	3
杨柳	Yang Liu	19	1.78 m (5 ft 10 in)	Qi Qi	Episode 12	2
康倩雯	"Kiki" Kang Qian Wen	26	1.80 m (5 ft 11 in)	Qi Qi	Episode 12	1

== Episodes ==
=== Episode 1 ===
First aired: March 21, 2015

The final fourteen part take in a fashion show with some of the season four contestants of China's Next Top Model before receiving their makeovers. They later have their first editorial photo shoot. Afterwards, they are divided into their teams and are flown to Melbourne, where they will stay for the remainder of the competition.

Team Jin Xing: Cai Hui, Chen Xi, Cui Nan, Dong Lei, Gu Ai Jia, Yao Xue Fei & Zheng Shi Hui
Team Qi Qi: Kiki Kang, Liu Yan Hong, Ren Rui, Yang Duo Lan, Yang Liu, Zhang Hao Yue & Zhong Lu Chun

=== Episode 2 ===
First aired: March 28, 2015

The fourteen finalists arrive to Australia, where the competition will take place. For the first challenge, a contestants from each team is sent to one of seven locations on a bus for a styling and photo challenge. Each model is allotted 10 minutes to get dressed and take her photo in her designated location before making it back into the bus before it drives away. Xi is disqualified for being late and missing the bus, losing the challenge for team Jin Xing. The contestants on team Qi Qi are chosen as the winners.

- Challenge winners: Kiki Kang, Liu Yan Hong, Ren Rui, Yang Duo Lan, Yang Liu, Zhang Hao Yue & Zhong Lu Chun

For the shoot the girls are paired off with a contestant from the opposite team in a rugged western-themed session.

Pairs
Ai Jia & Liu
Hui & Yan Hong
Kiki & Xue Fei
Lu Chun & Linda
Rui & Lei
Shi Hui & Hao Yue
Xi & Duo Lan

Each girl is evaluated individually at panel. After receiving their feedback, the models head to separate rooms with their mentor and teammates while the judges deliberate and decide who will be eliminated. After making their decision, a judge meets each team separately to hand out the photos of the models who are safe from elimination. Yan Hong and Shi Hui are revealed to be the bottom two contestants, and they head together to the elimination room where the final photo lies face-down on a podium. The last photo is revealed to be Shi Hui's, and Yan Hong is eliminated from the competition.

- Best photo: Ren Rui
- Bottom two: Liu Yan Hong & Zheng Shi Hui
- Eliminated: Liu Yan Hong

=== Episode 3 ===
First aired: April 4, 2015

The contestants are given money in order to decorate shop display windows fitting certain themes. Passersby are given flowers for them to place in a bucket in front of their preferred shop window.

Team	Models	Theme	Points	Total
Qi Qi	Duo Lan, Kiki, Rui	Christmas	4	9
Qi Qi	Hao Yue, Liu, Lu Chun	Dating	5	9
Jin Xing	Lei, Linda, Xi	Youth	6	11
Jin Xing	Ai Jia, Hui, Shi Hui, Xue Fei	Childhood	5	11

The girls from team Jin Xing collect the most points as a whole, becoming the winners of the challenge. As their prize for winning the challenge, they receive $3,000 for shopping.

- Challenge winners: Cai Hui, Chen Xi, Linda Cui, Gu Ai Jia, Dong Lei, Yao Xue Fei & Zheng Shi Hui

For the shoot the models are taken to the countryside, where they take part in a vintage bridal themed session with motorcyclists. After panel, the judges meet each team to reveal the models who are safe from elimination. The girls on team Qi Qi all receive photos, with Ai Jia and Shi Hiu being chosen as the bottom two. In the elimination room, the last photo is once again revealed to be Shi Hui's, and Ai Jia becomes the second girl to be eliminated.

- Best photo: Chen Xi
- Bottom two: Gu Ai Jia & Zheng Shi Hui
- Eliminated: Gu Ai Jia

=== Episode 4 ===
First aired: April 11, 2015

- Challenge winners: Kiki Kang, Ren Rui, Yang Duo Lan, Yang Liu, Zhang Hao Yue & Zhong Lu Chun
- Best photo: Kiki Kang
- Bottom two: Yang Liu & Zheng Shi Hui
- Eliminated: Zheng Shi Hui

=== Episode 5 ===
First aired: April 18, 2015

- Challenge winners: Cai Hui, Chen Xi, Linda Cui, Dong Lei & Yao Xue Fei
- Quit: Zhong Lu Chun
- Best photo: Kiki Kang
- Bottom two: Cai Hui & Zhang Hao Yue
- Eliminated: Cai Hui

=== Episode 6 ===
First aired: April 25, 2015

- Returned: Gu Ai Jia
- Best photo: Yao Xue Fei
- Bottom two: Gu Ai Jia & Linda Cui
- Eliminated: Linda Cui

=== Episode 7 ===
First aired: May 2, 2015

- Challenge winners: Kiki Kang, Ren Rui, Yang Duo Lan, Yang Liu & Zhang Hao Yue
- Best photo: Yao Xue Fei
- Bottom two: Dong Lei & Ren Rui
- Eliminated: Dong Lei

=== Episode 8 ===
First aired: May 9, 2015

- Challenge winners: Yang Duo Lan & Yao Xue Fei
- Best photo: Yang Liu
- Bottom three: Ren Rui, Yang Duo Lan & Zhang Hao Yue
- Eliminated: Ren Rui & Yang Duo Lan

=== Episode 9 ===
First aired: May 16, 2015

Go sees
Client	Models booked
Augest street	Kiki & Xi
FD Collection	Kiki & Xi
Jets swimwear	Kiki & Xue Fei
Pasduchas	Kiki & Xue Fei

Australian National day shoot
Group	Models
Farmers	Kiki & Xue Fei
Firemen	Hao Yue & Xi
Racecar drivers	Ai Jia & Liu

- Best photo: Kiki Kang
- Bottom two: Chen Xi & Zhang Hao Yue
- Eliminated: Zhang Hao Yue

=== Episode 10 ===
First aired: May 23, 2015

- Challenge winner: Yang Liu
- Best photo: Kiki Kang
- Bottom two: Chen Xi & Gu Ai Jia
- Eliminated: Gu Ai Jia

=== Episode 11 ===
First aired: May 30, 2015

- Challenge winner: Kiki Kang
- Best photo: Kiki Kang
- Bottom two: Chen Xi & Yao Xue Fei
- Eliminated: Chen Xi

=== Episode 12 ===
First aired: June 6, 2015

- Eliminated: Yao Xue Fei
- Final two: Kiki Kang & Yang Liu
- Winner: Kiki Kang

== Summaries ==
=== Call-out order ===
Team Jin Xing Team Qi Qi
Order	Episodes											
Order	1	2	3	4	5	6	7	8	9	10	11	12
1	Xi	Linda	Xi	Xue Fei	Xue Fei	Xue Fei	Xue Fei	Ai Jia	Ai Jia	Xue Fei	Xue Fei	Xue Fei
2	Xue Fei	Hui	Lei	Hui	Xi	Xi	Xi	Xue Fei	Xue Fei	Xi	Xi	
3	Ai Jia	Xi	Xue Fei	Lei	Linda	Lei	Ai Jia	Xi	Xi	Ai Jia		
4	Linda	Ai Jia	Hui	Linda	Lei	Ai Jia	Lei					
5	Lei	Xue Fei	Linda	Xi	Hui	Linda						
6	Shi Hui	Lei	Shi Hui	Shi Hui								
7	Hui	Shi Hui	Ai Jia									
1	Kiki	Rui	Rui	Kiki	Kiki	Rui	Kiki	Liu	Kiki	Kiki	Kiki	Kiki
2	Liu	Lu Chun	Kiki	Hao Yue	Duo Lan	Kiki	Hao Yue	Kiki	Liu	Liu	Liu	Liu
3	Duo Lan	Duo Lan	Liu	Rui	Liu	Duo Lan	Duo Lan	Hao Yue	Hao Yue			
4	Rui	Kiki	Hao Yue	Duo Lan	Rui	Liu	Liu	Duo Lan; Rui				
5	Hao Yue	Hao Yue	Lu Chun	Lu Chun	Hao Yue	Hao Yue	Rui	Duo Lan; Rui				
6	Lu Chun	Liu	Duo Lan	Liu	Lu Chun							
7	Yan Hong	Yan Hong										

The contestant received best photo
The contestant was in the danger of elimination
The contestant was eliminated
The contestant quit the competition
The contestant won the competition

- In episode 1, there was no elimination. The models were divided into their teams.
- In episode 5, Lu Chun quit the competition after disagreeing with the results of the challenge.
- In episode 6, Ai Jia returned to the competition.

=== Photo shoot guide ===
- Episode 1 photo shoots: Makeovers; 'Who Am I' editorial
- Episode 2 photo shoot: Western styling on a farm in pairs
- Episode 3 photo shoot: Vintage bridal
- Episode 4 photo shoot: Posing nude with handbags
- Episode 5 photo shoot: Girls on vacation
- Episode 6 photo shoot: Brighton bathing boxes
- Episode 7 photo shoot: Dynamic posing
- Episode 8 photo shoot: Countryside couture
- Episode 9 photo shoot: Australian national day
- Episode 10 photo shoot: Edgy swimwear on the beach
- Episode 11 photo shoot: Tribal wear in the wilderness
- Episode 12 photo shoot: High fashion editorial
