= China's Next Top Model season 5 =

China's Next Top Model
- Season 5
- No. of episodes: 12

Release
- Original network: Chongqing TV
- Original release: May 21 – August 6, 2015

Season chronology
- ← Previous; Season 4

China's Next Top Model Cycle 5 is the fifth cycle of the Chinese reality TV series, based on the international version and spin-off to the original, America's Next Top Model. It began to air on 21 May 2015 at 9:20 pm (UTC+8). This was the first season of the show to feature male contestants. The hosts were Chinese female supermodel Lynn Hung and Chinese male supermodel Zhang Liang.

The cycle featured 16 contestants competing for several prizes, including a modeling contract with Paras Talent Management and an editorial in Vogue China & GQ China.

The international destination for the show was London, with the rest of the filming taking place in Shanghai.

The winner of the competition was 22-year-old Li Si Jia from Harbin.

== Contestants ==
(Ages stated are at start of contest)

Contestant	Age	Height	Hometown	Finish	Place
Lai Yu Ting	22	1.77 m (5 ft 9 1/2 in)	Taipei, Taiwan	Episode 1	16–15
Jiang Ying	33	1.78 m (5 ft 10 in)	Beijing	Episode 1	16–15
Ha Sheng	32	1.80 m (5 ft 11 in)	Taipei, Taiwan	Episode 2	14
Xu Meng Ting	18	1.73 m (5 ft 8 in)	Shanghai	Episode 3	13
Jia Zhen Zhen	20	1.75 m (5 ft 9 in)	Chengdu, Sichuan	Episode 4	12
Yu Ling Yun	26	1.87 m (6 ft 1 1/2 in)	Shanghai	Episode 5	11
Wang Meng	22	1.75 m (5 ft 9 in)	Shanghai	Episode 5	10
Teng Tian Long	25	1.88 m (6 ft 2 in)	Chongqing	Episode 6	9
Yi Chen	21	1.86 m (6 ft 1 in)	Xuzhou, Jiangsu	Episode 7	8
Zhao Zhuo Nun	24	1.78 m (5 ft 10 in)	Wuxi, Jiangsu	Episode 8	7
Huang Si Qi	18	1.78 m (5 ft 10 in)	Hohhot, Inner Mongolia	Episode 9	6
Li Hao Ting	21	1.89 m (6 ft 2 1/2 in)	Huizhou, Guangdong	Episode 10	5
Liu Xian Xia	18	1.78 m (5 ft 10 in)	Tianjin	Episode 11	4
Wang Ren Chuan	20	1.90 m (6 ft 3 in)	Dalian, Liaoning	Episode 12	3
Li Xue	25	1.79 m (5 ft 10 1/2 in)	Huangpu, Shanghai	Episode 12	2
Li Si Jia	22	1.77 m (5 ft 9 1/2 in)	Harbin, Heilongjiang	Episode 12	1

== Episode summaries ==
=== Episode 1 ===
First aired: May 21, 2015

Scores
Nº	Model	Lynn	Liang	Lucia	Chal.	Media	Total
1	Si Jia	8	8	9	9	8	42
2	Tian Long	7	7	9	10	8	41
3	Hao Ting	7	10	7	10	7	41
4	Xian Xia	8	9	8	7	6	38
5	Xue	7	7	6	10	7	37
6	Chen	7	8	7	8	6	36
7	Si Qi	7	9	6	7	6	35
8	Ling Yun	6	6	7	9	7	35
9	Sheng	9	6	5	7	7	34
10	Meng Ting	7	6	6	8	6	33
11	Meng	7	6	5	6	7	31
12	Zhen Zhen	6	5	7	7	5	30
13	Zhuo Nun	5	5	8	6	6	30
14	Ren Chuan	5	7	5	5	7	29
15-16	Ying	6	6	4	6	6	28
15-16	Yu Ting	4	5	5	7	7	28

- First call-out: Li Si Jia
- Bottom three: Jiang Ying, Lai Yu Ting & Wang Ren Chuan
- Eliminated: Jiang Ying & Lai Yu Ting

=== Episode 2 ===
First aired: May 28, 2015

Scores
Nº	Model	Lynn	Liang	Lucia	Chal.	Media	Total
1	Chen	9	9	8	8	7	41
2	Xian Xia	9	9	7	8	7	40
3	Si Jia			8	7		37
4	Si Qi	6	7	7	8	8	36
5	Zhen Zhen				6		35
6	Xue				9		35
7	Ren Chuan	7	8	7	6	7	35
8	Zhuo Nun	7	7	7	7	7	35
9	Meng Ting				8		34
10	Hao Ting	6	7	6	8	6	33
11	Tian Long	6	7	6	7	7	33
12	Ling Yun	6	6	6	7	8	33
13	Meng				7		32
14	Sheng	6	6	5	8	6	31

- First call-out: Yi Chen
- Bottom two: Ha Sheng & Wang Meng
- Eliminated: Ha Sheng

=== Episode 3 ===
First aired: June 4, 2015

Scores
Nº	Model	Lynn	Liang	Lucia		Chal.	Media	Total
1	Xian Xia	9	9	10	9	8	6	51
2	Ren Chuan	8	9	7	9	10	7	50
3	Si Jia	8	8	9	8	8	7	48
4	Xue	8	8	9	9	6	6	46
5	Chen	7	7	7	7	7	7	42
6	Hao Ting	7	7	8	6	7	7	42
7	Zhuo Nun	8	6	7	7	7	6	41
8	Tian Long	7	6	6	7	9	6	41
9	Meng	6	7	7	7	7	7	41
10	Ling Yun	7	8	8	5	7	6	41
11	Si Qi	6	7	7	6	6	8	40
12	Zhen Zhen	6	8	6	6	7	6	39
13	Meng Ting	6	6	6	6	8	6	38

- First call-out: Liu Xian Xia
- Bottom two: Jia Zhen Zhen & Xu Meng Ting
- Eliminated: Xu Meng Ting

=== Episode 4 ===
First aired: June 11, 2015

- First call-out: Li Si Jia
- Bottom two: Jia Zhen Zhen & Yu Ling Yun
- Eliminated: Jia Zhen Zhen

=== Episode 5 ===
First aired: June 18, 2015

- First call-out: Li Hao Ting
- Bottom three: Liu Xian Xia, Yu Ling Yun & Wang Meng
- Eliminated: Yu Ling Yun & Wang Meng

=== Episode 6 ===
First aired: June 25, 2015

- First call-out: Zhao Zhuo Nun
- Bottom two: Teng Tian Long & Li Hao Ting
- Eliminated: Teng Tian Long

=== Episode 7 ===
First aired: July 2, 2015

- First call-out: Liu Xian Xia
- Bottom three: Li Si Jia, Li Xue & Yi Chen
- Eliminated: Yi Chen

=== Episode 8 ===
First aired: July 9, 2015

- First call-out: Li Si Jia
- Bottom two: Wang Ren Chuan & Zhao Zhuo Nun
- Eliminated: Zhao Zhuo Nun

=== Episode 9 ===
First aired: July 16, 2015

- First call-out: Li Si Jia
- Bottom two: Huang Si Qi & Wang Ren Chuan
- Eliminated: Huang Si Qi
- Special guest: Michael Cinco

=== Episode 10 ===
First aired: July 23, 2015

- First call-out: Li Xue
- Bottom two: Li Hao Ting & Liu Xian Xia
- Eliminated: Li Hao Ting
- Featured photographer: Dean Lee
- Special guest: Chen Ran

=== Episode 11 ===
First aired: July 30, 2015

- First call-out: Li Xue
- Bottom two: Liu Xian Xia & Wang Ren Chuan
- Eliminated: Liu Xian Xia

=== Episode 12 ===
First aired: August 6, 2015

Scores
Nº	Model	Lynn	Liang	Lucia		Chal.	Total
1	Si Jia	9	10	9	9	9	46
2	Xue	9	9	10	9	8	45
3	Ren Chuan	9	9	9	8	9	44

- Eliminated: Wang Ren Chuan
- Final two: Li Si Jia & Li Xue
- China's Next Top Model: Li Si Jia

== Summaries ==
=== Call-out order ===
Lynn & Zhang's call-out order
Order	Episodes											
Order	1	2	3	4	5	6	7	8	9	10	11	12
1	Si Jia	Chen	Xian Xia	Si Jia	Hao Ting	Zhuo Nun	Xian Xia	Si Jia	Si Jia	Xue	Xue	Si Jia
2	Tian Long	Xian Xia	Ren Chuan	Xian Xia	Tian Long	Xue	Ren Chuan	Xue	Xian Xia	Ren Chuan	Si Jia	Xue
3	Hao Ting	Si Jia	Si Jia	Si Qi	Si Jia	Si Qi	Hao Ting	Si Qi	Hao Ting	Si Jia	Ren Chuan	Ren Chuan
4	Xian Xia	Si Qi	Xue	Chen	Xue	Xian Xia	Si Qi	Xian Xia	Xue	Xian Xia	Xian Xia	
5	Xue	Zhen Zhen	Chen	Zhuo Nun	Si Qi	Chen	Zhuo Nun	Hao Ting	Ren Chuan	Hao Ting		
6	Chen	Xue	Hao Ting	Ren Chuan	Zhuo Nun	Si Jia	Si Jia; Xue	Ren Chuan	Si Qi			
7	Si Qi	Ren Chuan	Zhuo Nun	Xue	Chen	Ren Chuan	Si Jia; Xue	Zhuo Nun				
8	Ling Yun	Zhuo Nun	Tian Long	Hao Ting	Ren Chuan	Hao Ting	Chen					
9	Sheng	Meng Ting	Meng	Tian Long	Xian Xia	Tian Long						
10	Meng Ting	Hao Ting	Ling Yun	Meng	Meng							
11	Meng	Tian Long	Si Qi	Ling Yun	Ling Yun							
12	Zhen Zhen	Ling Yun	Zhen Zhen	Zhen Zhen								
13	Zhuo Nun	Meng	Meng Ting									
14	Ren Chuan	Sheng										
15	Ying; Yu Ting											
16	Ying; Yu Ting											

The contestant was eliminated
The contestant won the competition

- Episodes 1 and 5 featured a double elimination with the bottom three contestants facing the danger of elimination.
- In episode 7, Chen, Si Jia, and Xue landed in the bottom three. Si Jia and Xue were saved with a tied score of 33, while Chen was eliminated.

=== Scoring chart ===
Place	Model	Episodes												Total score	Average
Place	Model	1	2	3	4	5	6	7	8	9	10	11	12	Total score	Average
1	Si Jia	42	37	48	49	44	35	33	50	78	35	49	46	546	45.5
2	Xue	37	35	46	42	43	38	33	48	66	42	52	45	527	43.9
3	Ren Chuan	29	35	50	43	39	34	41	38	59	35	47	44	494	41.1
4	Xian Xia	38	40	51	48	38	35	42	42	75	34	38		481	43.7
5	Hao Ting	41	33	42	41	46	33	40	41	67	33			417	41.7
6	Si Qi	36	36	40	47	42	36	35	47	54				373	41.44
7	Zhuo Nun	30	35	41	44	42	41	34	37					304	38
8	Chen	36	41	42	45	39	35	30						268	38.29
9	Tian Long	41	33	41	40	45	32							232	38.67
10	Meng	31	32	41	38	37								179	35.8
11	Ling Yun	35	33	41	37	35								181	36.2
12	Zhen Zhen	30	35	39	31									135	33.75
13	Meng Ting	33	34	38										105	35
14	Sheng	34	31											65	32.5
15/16	Ying	28												28	28
15/16	Yu Ting	28												28	28

Indicates the contestant won the competition.
Indicates the contestant had the highest score that week.
Indicates the contestant was eliminated that week.
Indicates the contestant was in the bottom two that week.

- Episodes 3, 4, 5, 8 and 11 had a special guest joining the panel for scoring. This means that the maximum total increased from 50 points to 60.

=== Photo shoot guide ===
- Episode 1 photo shoot: Colorful editorial
- Episode 2 photo shoot: Jungle wilderness in groups for Tusk
- Episode 3 photo shoot: Beauty shots with flowers
- Episode 4 photo shoot: Falling look-book for I'Am
- Episode 5 photo shoot: Children's toys in groups
- Episode 6 music video: "Are You Tide?" - Bad Kids
- Episode 7 photo shoot: Suspended on polygons in metallic body paint
- Episode 8 photo shoot: Terminator inspired futuristic shoot
- Episode 9 photo shoot & fashion film: Waking up underwater; Michael Cinco collection
- Episode 10 photo shoot: On a yacht with Chen Ran for OK! girl China
- Episode 11 photo shoot: Punk rock editorial
- Episode 12 photo shoots: High end couture

=== Makeovers ===
- Chen: Military shave
- Hao Ting: Hair shaved on both sides
- Ling Yun: Buzzcut and dyed jewel blue
- Meng: Short pixie and dyed blue-black
- Meng Ting: Trimmed and lightened
- Ren Chuan: Bleached platinum blonde
- Si Jia: Hair shaved on one side and shortened
- Si Qi: Bangs added, hair shortened and dyed pink
- Tian Long: Shoulder length weave
- Xian Xia: Lightened eyebrows and hair parted at the center
- Xue: Dyed black with a natural wave
- Zhen Zhen: Bangs shortened and weave added at the back
- Zhuo Nun: Dyed dark brown
