= I Supermodel season 3 =

I Supermodel
- Season 3
- Season 3 cast
- No. of episodes: 12

Release
- Original network: iQiyi
- Original release: October 14 – December 30, 2016

Season chronology
- ← Previous; Season 2

I Supermodel 3 is the third season of the Chinese reality show and modeling competition of the same name. Filming for season three took place in Los Angeles. The show featured 14 new contestants in the final cast, and premiered on October 14, 2016.

The prizes for this cycle included a modelling contract with NEXT Model Management, a shopping spree worth $50,000 at Los Angeles Citadel Outlets and an I Supermodel pearls crown.

The winner of the competition was 19-year-old Yan Yu Bo.

== Contestants ==
(ages stated are at time of contest)

Contestant		Age	Height	Team	Finish	Rank
陈晓寒	Chen Xiao Han	20	1.74 m (5 ft 8 1/2 in)	Queen	Episode 2	14-13
李雅雯	Li Ya Wen	21	1.75 m (5 ft 9 in)	Queen	Episode 2	14-13
牛薇薇	Niu Wei Wei	24	1.77 m (5 ft 9 1/2 in)	Ace	Episode 3	12
周君怡	"Jinx" Zhou Jun Yi	19	1.68 m (5 ft 6 in)	Ace	Episode 4	11
康雅馨	"Naomi" Kang Ya Xin	22	1.75 m (5 ft 9 in)	Ace	Episode 5	10
钱凯丽	"Kelly" Qian Kai Li	25	1.80 m (5 ft 11 in)	Queen	Episode 6	9 (quit)
董奕杭	Dong Yi Hang	20	1.80 m (5 ft 11 in)	Ace	Episode 7	8
汪欣蕾	Wang Xin Lei	28	1.73 m (5 ft 8 in)	Ace	Episode 9	7-6
韩红盼	Han Hong Pan	26	1.77 m (5 ft 9 1/2 in)	Queen	Episode 9	7-6
娄清	Lou Qing	28	1.78 m (5 ft 10 in)	Ace	Episode 10	5
蒋浩铃	"Abby" Jiang Hao Ling	23	1.78 m (5 ft 10 in)	Queen	Episode 11	4
庞莹	Pang Ying	26	1.75 m (5 ft 9 in)	Queen	Episode 12	3
付欢欢	Fu Huan Huan	21	1.80 m (5 ft 11 in)	Ace	Episode 12	2
彦禹博	Yan Yu Bo	19	1.80 m (5 ft 11 in)	Queen	Episode 12	1

== Episodes ==
=== Episode 1 ===
Original Airdate: October 14, 2016

Team Ace: Dong Yi Hang, Fu Huan Huan, Jinx Zhou, Lou Qing, Naomi Kang, Niu Wei Wei & Wang Xin Lei
Team Queen: Abby Jiang, Chen Xiao Han, Han Hong Pan, Kelly Qian, Li Ya Wen, Pang Ying & Yan Yu Bo

=== Episode 2 ===
Original Airdate: October 21, 2016

Pairs
Abby & Huan Huan
Hong Pan & Wei Wei
Jinx & Ya Wen
Kelly & Yi Hang
Naomi & Yu Bo
Qing & Ying
Xiao Han & Xin Lei

- Best photo: Abby Jiang
- Bottom three: Chen Xiao Han, Kelly Qian & Li Ya Wen
- Eliminated: Chen Xiao Han & Li Ya Wen

=== Episode 3 ===
Original Airdate: October 28, 2016

- Best photo: Lou Qing
- Bottom two: Dong Yi Hang & Niu Wei Wei
- Eliminated: Niu Wei Wei

=== Episode 4 ===
Original Airdate: November 4, 2016

- Best photo: Dong Yi Hang
- Bottom two: Jinx Zhou & Kelly Qian
- Eliminated: Jinx Zhou
- Guest judge: Coco Rocha

=== Episode 5 ===
Original Airdate: November 11, 2016

- Best photo: Pang Ying
- Bottom three: Naomi Kang, Wang Xin Lei & Yan Yu Bo
- Eliminated: Naomi Kang

=== Episode 6 ===
Original Airdate: November 18, 2016

- Quit: Kelly Qian
- Best photo: Yan Yu Bo
- Originally eliminated: Wang Xin Lei

=== Episode 7 ===
Original Airdate: November 25, 2016

- Best photo: Yan Yu Bo
- Bottom two: Abby Jiang & Dong Yi Hang
- Eliminated: Dong Yi Hang

=== Episode 8 ===
Original Airdate: December 2, 2016

- Best photo: Fu Huan Huan
- Bottom two: Abby Jiang & Wang Xin Lei
- Eliminated: None

=== Episode 9 ===
Original Airdate: December 9, 2016

- Immune from elimination: Fu Huan Huan
- Best photo: Abby Jiang
- Bottom three: Han Hong Pan, Lou Qing & Wang Xin Lei
- Eliminated: Han Hong Pan & Wang Xin Lei

=== Episode 10 ===
Original Airdate: December 16, 2016

- Best photo: Yan Yu Bo
- Bottom two: Abby Jiang & Lou Qing
- Eliminated: Lou Qing

=== Episode 11 ===
Original Airdate: December 23, 2016

- Best photo: Yan Yu Bo
- Bottom two: Abby Jiang & Fu Huan Huan
- Eliminated: Abby Jiang

=== Episode 12 ===
Original Airdate: December 30, 2016

- Eliminated: Pang Ying
- Final two: Fu Huan Huan & Yan Yu Bo
- Winner: Yan Yu Bo

== Summaries ==
=== Call-out order ===
Team Ace Team Queen
Order	Episodes											
Order	1	2	3	4	5	6	7	8	9	10	11	12
1	Qing	Naomi	Qing	Yi Hang	Huan Huan	Yi Hang	Qing	Huan Huan	Huan Huan	Huan Huan	Huan Huan	Huan Huan
2	Wei Wei	Huan Huan	Naomi	Naomi	Qing	Huan Huan	Xin Lei	Qing	Qing	Qing		
3	Naomi	Xin Lei	Huan Huan	Qing	Yi Hang	Qing	Huan Huan	Xin Lei	Xin Lei			
4	Xin Lei	Wei Wei	Xin Lei	Huan Huan	Xin Lei	Xin Lei	Yi Hang					
5	Huan Huan	Yi Hang	Jinx	Xin Lei	Naomi							
6	Yi Hang	Qing	Yi Hang	Jinx								
7	Jinx	Jinx	Wei Wei									
1	Kelly	Abby	Yu Bo	Yu Bo	Ying	Yu Bo	Yu Bo	Hong Pan	Abby	Yu Bo	Yu Bo	Yu Bo
2	Yu Bo	Yu Bo	Abby	Hong Pan	Hong Pan	Ying	Ying	Ying	Yu Bo	Ying	Ying	Ying
3	Ying	Hong Pan	Kelly	Ying	Kelly	Abby	Hong Pan	Yu Bo	Ying	Abby	Abby	
4	Xiao Han	Ying	Ying	Abby	Abby	Hong Pan	Abby	Abby	Hong Pan			
5	Hong Pan	Kelly	Hong Pan	Kelly	Yu Bo	Kelly						
6	Abby	Xiao Han; Ya Wen										
7	Ya Wen	Xiao Han; Ya Wen										

The contestant received best photo
The contestant was in the danger of elimination
The contestant was eliminated
The contestant was immune from elimination
The contestant won the competition

- In episode 1, there was no elimination and the models were divided into their teams.
- In episode 2, there was a double elimination. All of the contestants from team Ace were safe. In team Queen, Kelly, Xiao Han, and Ya Wen were chosen as the bottom three. The last contestant saved was Kelly, and the other two were eliminated.
- In episode 6, Kelly withdrew from the competition. As a result, the original eliminee Xin Lei was saved from elimination.
- In episode 8, Abby and Xin Lei landed in the bottom two, but no one was eliminated.
- In episode 9, Huan Huan was granted immunity from elimination after having booked the most shows in New York Fashion Week.

=== Photo shoot guide ===
- Episode 1 photo & video shoot: Simplistic beauty; opening sequence
- Episode 2 photo shoot: American football
- Episode 3 photo shoot: Vintage motel
- Episode 4 photo shoot: Edgy dominatrix with male models
- Episode 5 photo shoot: Burlesque
- Episode 6 photo shoot: Colorful fashion in Salvation Mountain
- Episode 7 photo shoot: Posing with unique models
- Episode 8 photo shoot: Damp haired beauty in a villa
- Episode 9 photo shoot: New York Mafia
- Episode 10 photo shoot: Superheroes
- Episode 11 photo shoot: Sex and the City
- Episode 12 photo shoot: Comp cards
