= I Supermodel season 2 =

I Supermodel
- Season 2
- Season 2 cast
- No. of episodes: 12

Release
- Original network: iQiyi
- Original release: October 22, 2015

Season chronology
- ← Previous; Season 1 Next → Season 3

I Supermodel 2 is the second season of the Chinese reality show and modeling competition of the same name. Filming for season two took place in London. The show featured 14 new contestants in the final cast. Special appearances for the show included several high-profile guests, including Alexa Chung, David Gandy, Erin O'Connor with Giovanni Squatriti, J. Alexander, Lily Donaldson, Miranda Kerr and former British supermodel Twiggy. The show premiered on October 22, 2015.

The prizes for this cycle included a modelling contract with Storm Model Management and an editorial spread in Harper's Bazaar China.

The winner of the competition was 23-year-old Zhao Jia Tong.

== Contestants ==
(ages stated are at time of contest)

Contestant		Age	Height	Team	Finish	Rank
姜韵轩	Jiang Yun Xuan	26	1.77 m (5 ft 9 1/2 in)	OK	Episode 2	14
马慧慧	Ma Hui Hui	20	1.81 m (5 ft 11 1/2 in)	KO	Episode 7	13
李梦琦	Li Meng Qi	19	1.80 m (5 ft 11 in)	OK	Episode 4	12-11
龙浚骄	Long Jun Jiao	26	1.78 m (5 ft 10 in)	KO	Episode 4	12-11
陈玉婷	Chen Yu Ting	18	1.77 m (5 ft 9 1/2 in)	KO	Episode 5	10
王熙然	Wang Xi Ran	24	1.75 m (5 ft 9 in)	OK	Episode 6	9
王书琪	Wang Shu Qi	19	1.81 m (5 ft 11 1/2 in)	KO	Episode 7	8
那广子	Na Guang Zi	26	1.80 m (5 ft 11 in)	OK	Episode 8	7
孙臣民	Sun Chen Min	20	1.78 m (5 ft 10 in)	KO	Episode 9	6
毕婧	Bi Jing	20	1.82 m (5 ft 11 1/2 in)	OK	Episode 11	5-4
刘欣洁	Liu Xin Jie	25	1.76 m (5 ft 9 1/2 in)	KO	Episode 11	5-4
马梦嘉	Ma Meng Jia	23	1.76 m (5 ft 9 1/2 in)	OK	Episode 12	3
王梦雅	Wang Meng Ya	26	1.78 m (5 ft 10 in)	OK	Episode 12	2
赵家彤	Zhao Jia Tong	23	1.80 m (5 ft 11 in)	KO	Episode 12	1

== Episodes ==
=== Episode 1 ===
Original Airdate: October 22, 2015

Team KO: Liu Xin Jie (leader), Chen Yu Ting, Long Jun Jiao, Ma Hui Hui, Sun Chen Min, Wang Shu Qi & Zhao Jia Tong
Team OK: Wang Meng Ya (leader), Bi Jing, Jiang Yun Xuan, Ma Meng Jia, Li Meng Qi, Na Guang Zi & Wang Xi Ran

- Special guests: J. Alexander

=== Episode 2 ===
Original Airdate: October 29, 2015

Pairs
Chen Min & Xi Ran
Guang Zi & Hui Hui
Jing & Jia Tong
Jun Jiao & Yun Xuan
Meng Jia & Yu Ting
Meng Qi & Shu Qi
Meng Ya & Xin Jie

- Best photo: Chen Yu Ting
- Bottom two: Jiang Yun Xuan & Liu Xin Jie
- Eliminated: Jiang Yun Xuan
- Special guests: J. Alexander, fashion photographer Giovanni Squatriti & Erin O'Connor

=== Episode 3 ===
Original Airdate: November 5, 2015

- Best photo: Bi Jing
- Bottom two: Ma Hui Hui & Wang Shu Qi
- Eliminated: Ma Hui Hui

=== Episode 4 ===
Original Airdate: November 12, 2015

- Best photo: Zhao Jia Tong
- Bottom four: Chen Yu Ting, Li Meng Qi, Long Jun Jiao & Wang Xi Ran
- Eliminated: Li Meng Qi & Long Jun Jiao

=== Episode 5 ===
Original Airdate: November 19, 2015

- Best photo: Liu Xin Jie
- Bottom two: Chen Yu Ting & Wang Xi Ran
- Eliminated: Chen Yu Ting

=== Episode 6 ===
Original Airdate: November 26, 2015

- Best photo: Zhao Jia Tong
- Bottom two: Wang Shu Qi & Wang Xi Ran
- Eliminated: Wang Xi Ran

=== Episode 7 ===
Original Airdate: December 3, 2015

- Best photo: Liu Xin Jie
- Bottom two: Bi Jing & Wang Shu Qi
- Eliminated: Wang Shu Qi

=== Episode 8 ===
Original Airdate: December 10, 2015

- Best photo: Bi Jing
- Bottom two: Sun Chen Min & Na Guang Zi
- Eliminated: Na Guang Zi

=== Episode 9 ===
Original Airdate: December 17, 2015

- Best photo: Wang Meng Ya
- Bottom two: Ma Meng Jia & Sun Chen Min
- Eliminated: Sun Chen Min

=== Episode 10 ===
Original Airdate: December 24, 2015

- Best photo: Ma Meng Jia
- Bottom two: Bi Jing & Liu Xin Jie
- Originally eliminated: Liu Xin Jie

=== Episode 11 ===
Original Airdate: December 31, 2015

- Best photo: Wang Meng Ya
- Bottom three: Bi Jing, Liu Xin Jie & Ma Meng Jia
- Eliminated: Bi Jing & Liu Xin Jie

=== Episode 12 ===
Original Aridate: January 7, 2016

- Eliminated: Ma Meng Jia
- Final two: Wang Meng Ya & Zhao Jia Tong
- Winner: Zhao Jia Tong

== Summaries ==
=== Call-out order ===
Team KO Team OK
Order	Episodes											
Order	1	2	3	4	5	6	7	8	9	10	11	12
1	Xin Jie	Yu Ting	Xin Jie	Jia Tong	Xin Jie	Jia Tong	Xin Jie	Xin Jie	Jia Tong	Jia Tong	Jia Tong	Jia Tong
2	Yu Ting	Jia Tong	Jun Jiao	Xin Jie	Shu Qi	Xin Jie	Chen Min	Jia Tong	Xin Jie	Xin Jie	Xin Jie	
3	Jia Tong	Shu Qi	Jia Tong	Chen Min	Jia Tong	Chen Min	Jia Tong	Chen Min	Chen Min			
4	Shu Qi	Jun Jiao	Yu Ting	Shu Qi	Chen Min	Shu Qi	Shu Qi					
5	Chen Min	Chen Min	Chen Min	Yu Ting	Yu Ting							
6	Jun Jiao	Hui Hui	Shu Qi	Jun Jiao								
7	Hui Hui	Xin Jie	Hui Hui									
1	Meng Ya	Jing	Jing	Jing	Meng Ya	Guang Zi	Meng Ya	Jing	Meng Ya	Meng Jia	Meng Ya	Meng Ya
2	Guang Zi	Meng Jia	Guang Zi	Meng Ya	Jing	Meng Jia	Guang Zi	Meng Ya	Jing	Meng Ya	Meng Jia	Meng Jia
3	Jing	Meng Qi	Meng Jia	Guang Zi	Guang Zi	Jing	Meng Jia	Meng Jia	Meng Jia	Jing	Jing	
4	Meng Jia	Meng Ya	Meng Qi	Meng Jia	Meng Jia	Meng Ya	Jing	Guang Zi				
5	Meng Qi	Guang Zi	Meng Ya	Xi Ran	Xi Ran	Xi Ran						
6	Xi Ran	Xi Ran	Xi Ran	Meng Qi								
7	Yun Xuan	Yun Xuan										

The contestant received best photo
The contestant was in the danger of elimination
The contestant was eliminated
The contestant was originally eliminated, but was saved
The contestant won the competition

- In episode 1, there was no elimination and the models were divided into their teams. There were no mentors this season. Instead Meng Ya and Xin Jie, who were deemed to be the best performers in the cover shoot, were each designated the role of team leader. The leader of each team chose the first contestant of her team, the first chose the second, the second the third, etc., alternating between teams until all seven slots were filled.
- In episode 10, Xin Jie was originally eliminated but the judges decided to save her.

=== Photo shoot guide ===
- Episode 1 photo shoot: Makeovers; I Supermodel magazine covers
- Episode 2 photo shoot: Graveyard in pairs
- Episode 3 photo shoot: Bond girls
- Episode 4 photo shoot: Arcade games
- Episode 5 photo shoot: Subway grunge in pairs
- Episode 6 photo shoot: Posing with a horse
- Episode 7 photo shoot: Jumping from a trampoline
- Episode 8 photo shoot: Downton Abbey
- Episode 9 photo shoot: Timeless fashion
- Episode 10 photo shoot: Wonderland editorial
- Episode 11 photo shoot: Wearing recycled garments
- Episode 12 photo shoot: Harper's Bazaar cover tries
