= I Supermodel =

- Show logo
- Starring: Current: J. Alexander; Yu Tsai; Simon Yam; Shu Pei; Former: Jin Xing; Qi Qi; Han Huo Huo; Ming Xi; Sui He
- Opening theme: MitiS - Give My Regards
- Country of origin: China
- No. of seasons: 3
- No. of episodes: 36

Production
- Running time: 60 minutes

Original release
- Network: iQiyi
- Release: March 21, 2015 – December 30, 2016

I Supermodel (Chinese: 爱上超模) is a Chinese reality series and modeling competition. The show places a group of fourteen female contestants who are selected by a mentor to compete in teams of seven. The goal of the show is to immerse the finalists into the world of high fashion through several editorial shoots and high paced challenges, finding the perfect supermodel.

Filming for the show takes place in an overseas location that is unique to each season. The first season of the show was filmed in Melbourne, Australia, and began to air on March 21, 2015. On May 26, 2015 a second season was announced. The show took applications for girls over 16 years old who met a minimum height requirement of 175 cm (5 ft 9 in). Filming for the second season took place in London.

I Supermodel is currently one of the most highly regarded modeling series in China, with total views for season one reaching over 280 million on iQiyi, and ranking at #1 for shows of the same genre.

== Format ==
=== Team selection ===
At the beginning of each season, the chosen contestants meet the two model mentors of the show. After evaluating their performance on the runway and in front of the lens, each judge alternates in picking a contestant for their team from the pool of selected finalists.

=== Challenges ===
Each episode contains a challenge focusing on elements important to modeling. The contestants are graded on a numerical basis, each earning a score for their performance. The team with the most points at the end of the challenge wins collectively, regardless of any individual losses or wins in the challenge. Challenges in the later half of the competition are won individually.

=== Judging and elimination ===
For judging, a panel of experts evaluates each contestants' performance on the photo shoot and determines who will be eliminated, with the mentors having little to no say in the final decision. Elimination follows the same format as a regular Top Model show, but the call-out takes place individually in each of the teams. This means that the last girl who has not received a photo in each team, must join the other one for elimination. In cases where both the worst and the second worst performers are in the same team, both are sent for elimination, while all of the members of the other team remain safe. The contestant who does not receive a photo is automatically eliminated.

== Cycles ==
Cycle	Premiere date	Winner	Runner-up	Other contestants in order of elimination	Number of contestants	International Destinations
1	March 21, 2015	Kiki Kang	Yang Liu	Liu Yan Hong, Zheng Shi Hui, Zhong Lu Chun (quit), Cai Hui, Linda Cui, Dong Lei, Yang Duo Lan & Ren Rui, Zhang Hao Yue, Gu Ai Jia, Chen Xi, Yao Xue Fei	14	Melbourne
2	October 22, 2015	Zhao Jia Tong	Wang Meng Ya	Jiang Yun Xuan, Ma Hui Hui, Long Jun Jiao & Li Meng Qi, Chen Yu Ting, Wang Xi Ran, Wang Shu Qi, Na Guang Zi, Sun Chen Min, Bi Jing & Liu Xin Jie, Ma Meng Jia	14	London
3	October 14, 2016	Yan Yu Bo	Fu Huan Huan	Chen Xiao Han & Li Ya Wen, Niu Wei Wei, Jinx Zhou, Naomi Kang, Kelly Qian (quit), Dong Yi Hang, Wang Xin Lei & Han Hong Pan, Lou Qing, Abby Jiang, Pang Ying	14	Los Angeles

== See also ==
- China's Next Top Model
