= China's Next Top Model season 2 =

China's Next Top Model
- Season 2
- No. of episodes: 10

Release
- Original network: Sichuan Satellite TV
- Original release: January 9 – March 13, 2009

Season chronology
- ← Previous; Season 1 Next → Season 3

China's Next Top Model is a Chinese reality TV series, based on the international version and spin-off to the original, America's Next Top Model.

The show was produced by Chinese television subscription channel Sichuan Satellite TV and it is filmed in Shanghai, the casting was held in selected cities of China - Shanghai, Beijing, Chengdu, and Guangzhou. It began airing on January 9, 2009.

Among the prizes for this season was a contract with Elite Model Management, a fashion spread in Marie Claire China magazine and a contract with Max Factor.

Ultimately, 21-year-old Meng Yao from Harbin was declared the winner of the competition.

== Contestants ==
(ages stated are at start of contest)

Contestant	Age	Height	Hometown	Finish	Place
Zhang Cai	18	1.72 m (5 ft 7 1/2 in)	Yichang	Episode 2	10
Li Muo	21	1.75 m (5 ft 9 in)	Shandong	Episode 3	9
Hu Lu Lu	25	1.73 m (5 ft 8 in)	Sichuan	Episode 4	8
Tan Jie	19	1.75 m (5 ft 9 in)	Chongqing	Episode 5	7
Lili Anna	25	1.78 m (5 ft 10 in)	Macau	Episode 6	6
Zhang Yang	21	1.75 m (5 ft 9 in)	Jilin	Episode 7	5
Wang Shan	22	1.74 m (5 ft 8 1/2 in)	Liaoning	Episode 8	4
He Xin	19	1.80 m (5 ft 11 in)	Heilongjiang	Episode 10	3
Mo Jia Qi	23	1.74 m (5 ft 8 1/2 in)	Shandong	Episode 10	2
Meng Yao	21	1.79 m (5 ft 10 1/2 in)	Harbin	Episode 10	1

== Episodes ==
=== Episode 1 ===
Casting episode.

=== Episode 2 ===
- First call-out: Mo Jia Qi
- Bottom two: Hu Lu Lu & Zhang Cai
- Eliminated: Zhang Cai

=== Episode 3 ===
- First call-out: Meng Yao
- Bottom two: Li Muo & Zhang Yang
- Eliminated: Li Muo

=== Episode 4 ===
- First call-out: Lili Anna
- Bottom two: Hu Lu Lu & Zhang Yang
- Eliminated: Hu Lu Lu

=== Episode 5 ===
- First call-out: Meng Yao
- Bottom two: Mo Jia Qi & Tan Jie
- Eliminated: Tan Jie

=== Episode 6 ===
- First call-out: Mo Jia Qi
- Bottom two: He Xin & Lili Anna
- Eliminated: Lili Anna

=== Episode 7 ===
- First call-out: He Xin
- Bottom two: Wang Shan & Zhang Yang
- Eliminated: Zhhang Yang

=== Episode 8 ===
- First call-out: Meng Yao
- Bottom two: He Xin & Wang Shan
- Eliminated: Wang Shan

=== Episode 9 ===
Recap episode.

=== Episode 10 ===
- First call-out: Meng Yao
- Bottom two: He Xin & Mo Jia Qi
- Eliminated: He Xin
- Final two: Meng Yao & Mo Jia Qi
- China's Next Top Model: Meng Yao

== Summaries ==
=== Call-out order ===
Ai's call-out order
Order	Episodes									
Order	1	2	3	4	5	6	7	8	10	
1	Xin	Jia Qi	Yao	Lili	Yao	Jia Qi	Xin	Yao	Yao	Yao
2	Lu Lu	Xin	Shan	Xin	Yang	Yao	Yao	Jia Qi	Jia Qi	Jia Qi
3	Yao	Yao	Jia Qi	Shan	Lili	Shan	Jia Qi	Xin	Xin	
4	Jia Qi	Jie	Xin	Jia Qi	Shan	Yang	Shan	Shan		
5	Lili	Muo	Jie	Jie	Xin	Xin	Yang			
6	Muo	Shan	Lu Lu	Yao	Jia Qi	Lili				
7	Jie	Lili	Lili	Yang	Jie					
8	Shan	Yang	Yang	Lu Lu						
9	Cai	Lu Lu	Muo							
10	Yang	Cai								

The contestant was eliminated
The contestant won the competition

- In episode 1, the group of girls was reduced to 10 that would move on to the main competition. This first call-out does not reflect their performance that first week.
- Episode 9 is the recap episode.

=== Bottom Two ===
Episodes	Contestants			Eliminated
2	Cai	&	Lu Lu	Cai
3	Muo	&	Yang	Muo
4	Lu Lu	&	Yang	Lu Lu
5	Jia Qi	&	Jie	Jie
6	Lili	&	Xin	Lili
7	Shan	&	Yang	Yang
8	Shan	&	Xin	Shan
10	Jia Qi	&	Xin	Xin
10	Jia Qi	&	Yao	Jia Qi

The contestant was eliminated after their first time in the bottom two
The contestant was eliminated after their second time in the bottom two
The contestant was eliminated after their third time in the bottom two
The contestant was placed as the runner-up

=== Average call-out order ===
Final two are not included.

Rank by average	Place	Model	Call-out total	Number of call-outs	Call-out average
1	1	Yao	17	8	2.13
2	2	Jia Qi	22	8	2.75
3	3	Xin	25	8	3.13
4	4	Shan	26	7	3.55
5	6	Lili	24	5	4.80
6	7	Jie	21	4	5.25
7	5	Yang	34	6	5.66
8	9	Muo	14	2	7.00
9	8	Lu Lu	23	3	7.67
10	10	Cai	10	1	10.00

=== Photo shoot guide ===
- Episode 1 photo shoot: Student ID card (casting)
- Episode 2 photo shoot: Lingerie by the pool
- Episode 3 photo shoot: Beauty shots with creatures
- Episode 4 photo shoot: Makeovers
- Episode 5 photo shoot: Girls as boys
- Episode 6 photo shoot: Marie Claire magazine covers
- Episode 7 photo shoot & commercial: Max Factor
- Episode 8 photo shoot: Music genres
- Episode 10 photo shoot: Max Factor beauty shots

=== Makeovers ===
- Lu Lu: Side parted with layers
- Jie: Cut short
- Lili: Long, close-knit curls
- Yang: Cut short
- Shan: Dyed blonde with bangs
- Xin: Long, loose curls
- Jia Qi: Bangs with red-dye finished
- Yao: Cut shorter with longer bangs and straightened
