= China's Next Top Model season 3 =

China's Next Top Model
- Season 3
- Starring: Li Ai; Grace Han; Li Dong Tian; Deng Li; Han Huo Huo
- No. of episodes: 12

Release
- Original network: Sichuan Satellite TV
- Original release: June 13 – September 4, 2010

Season chronology
- ← Previous; Season 2 Next → Season 4

China's Next Top Model Cycle 3 is the third Cycle of the Chinese reality TV series, based on the international version and spin-off to the original, America's Next Top Model.

The show was produced by Chinese television subscription channel Sichuan Satellite TV and it is filmed in Shanghai, the casting was held in selected cities of China - Hangzhou, Nanjing, Guangzhou, Nanning, Dalian, Wuhan, Changsha, and Chengdu. It began airing on June 13, 2010.

Among the prizes for this season was: a modeling contract with an international agency, a contract with Hengdian World Studios, an appearance on the cover of Marie Claire China plus will join the yearly Marie Claire China fashion ceremony, become a spokesperson of Wahaha products, represent China on the World Supermodel Finals 2011 and act in a charitable fashion drama "美麗模坊之明日天後" (the day after the competition).

The winner of the competition was 18-year-old Mao Chu Yu from Chengdu, Sichuan.

== Contestants ==
(ages stated are at start of contest)

Contestant	Age	Height	Hometown	Finish	Place
Yan Ling	20	1.80 m (5 ft 11 in)	Dalian	Episode 4	12-11 (quit)
Jia An Qi	21	1.78 m (5 ft 10 in)	Dalian	Episode 4	12-11 (quit)
Zhu Yan	23	1.75 m (5 ft 9 in)	Shanghai	Episode 4	10
Sun Yue	21	1.74 m (5 ft 8 1/2 in)	Qingdao, Shandong	Episode 5	9
Zhao Yi Fei	19	1.80 m (5 ft 11 in)	Dalian, Liaoning	Episode 6	8 (quit)
Shi Yu	20	1.78 m (5 ft 10 in)	Chengdu, Sichuan	Episode 6	7
Chao Chang Yi Lan	19	1.80 m (5 ft 11 in)	Wuhan, Hubei	Episode 7	6
Zhu Yue	18	1.76 m (5 ft 9 1/2 in)	Nanjing, Jiangsu	Episode 8	5
Huang Qi	20	1.75 m (5 ft 9 in)	Changsha, Hunan	Episode 10	4
Wang Sheng Jie	21	1.76 m (5 ft 9 1/2 in)	Qingdao, Shandong	Episode 11	3
Lin Jia Yi	20	1.76 m (5 ft 9 1/2 in)	Guangzhou, Guangdong	Episode 12	2
Mao Chu Yu	18	1.80 m (5 ft 11 in)	Chengdu, Sichuan	Episode 12	1

== Episodes ==
=== Episode 1 ===
First casting episode.

=== Episode 2 ===
Second casting episode

=== Episode 3 ===
Third casting episode

- Quit: Ling & Jia An Qi

=== Episode 4 ===
- First call-out: Zhu Yue
- Bottom two: Huang Qi & Zhu Yan
- Eliminated: Zhu Yan

=== Episode 5 ===
- First call-out: Zhao Yi Fei
- Bottom two: Sun Yue & Wang Sheng Jie
- Eliminated: Sun Yue

=== Episode 6 ===
- Quit: Zhao Yi Fei
- First call-out: Wang Sheng Jie
- Bottom two: Lin Jia Yi & Shi Yu
- Eliminated: Shi Yu

=== Episode 7 ===
- First call-out: Lin Jia Yi
- Bottom two: Chaochang Yi Lan & Huang Qi
- Eliminated: Chaochang Yi Lan

=== Episode 8 ===
- First call-out: Wang Sheng Jie
- Bottom two: Lin Jia Yi & Zhu Yue
- Eliminated: Zhu Yue

=== Episode 9 ===
- First call-out: Lin Jia Yi
- Bottom two: Huang Qi & Mao Chu Yu
- Eliminated: None

=== Episode 10 ===
- First call-out: Mao Chu Yu
- Bottom two: Huang Qi & Lin Jia Yi
- Eliminated: Huang Qi

=== Episode 11 ===
- First call-out: Mao Chu Yu
- Bottom two: Lin Jia Yi & Wang Sheng Jie
- Eliminated: Wang Sheng Jie

=== Episode 12 ===
- Final two: Lin Jia Yi & Mao Chu Yu
- China's Next Top Model: Mao Chu Yu

== Summaries ==
=== Call-out order ===
Ai's call-out order
Order	Episodes									
Order	3	4	5	6	7	8	9	10	11	12
1	Chu Yu	Yue Z.	Yi Fei	Sheng Jie	Jia Yi	Sheng Jie	Jia Yi	Chu Yu	Chu Yu	Chu Yu
2	Jia Yi	Jia Yi	Chu Yu	Chu Yu	Chu Yu	Qi	Sheng Jie	Sheng Jie	Jia Yi	Jia Yi
3	Sheng Jie	Yi Fei	Jia Yi	Qi	Yue Z.	Chu Yu	Chu Yu; Qi	Jia Yi	Sheng Jie	
4	Yi Lan	Yi Lan	Yi Lan	Yi Lan	Sheng Jie	Jia Yi	Chu Yu; Qi	Qi		
5	Yan	Chu Yu	Yu	Yue Z.	Qi	Yue Z.				
6	Ling	Sheng Jie	Yue Z.	Jia Yi	Yi Lan					
7	An Qi	Yu	Qi	Yu						
8	Yue Z.	Yue S.	Sheng Jie	Yi Fei						
9	Qi	Qi	Yue S.							
10	Yue S.	Yan								
11		An Qi; Ling								
12		An Qi; Ling								

The contestant quit the competition
The contestant was eliminated
The contestant was part of a non-elimination bottom two.
The contestant won the competition

- In the beginning of episode 4, Ling and An Qi, quit the competition due to scholar issues, they were replaced by Yi Fei and Yu in the beginning of the challenge.
- In episode 6, Yi Fei decided quit the competition, due to School exams.
- In episode 9, there was a non-elimination.

=== Bottom Two ===
Episodes	Contestants			Eliminated
3	None			An Qi
3	None			Ling
4	Qi	&	Yan	Yan
5	Sheng Jie	&	Yue S.	Yue S.
6	Jia Yi	&	Yu	Yi Fei
6	Jia Yi	&	Yu	Yu
7	Qi	&	Yi Lan	Yi Lan
8	Jia Yi	&	Yue Z.	Yue Z.
9	Chu Yu	&	Qi	None
10	Jia Yi	&	Qi	Qi
11	Jia Yi	&	Sheng Jie	Sheng Jie
11	Chu Yu	&	Jia Yi	Jia Yi

The contestant was eliminated after their first time in the bottom two
The contestant was eliminated after their second time in the bottom two
The contestant was eliminated after their fourth time in the bottom two
The contestant quit the competition
The contestant was eliminated and placed as the runner-up

=== Average call-out order ===
Final two are not included.

Rank by average	Place	Model	Call-out total	Number of call-outs	Call-out average
1	8	Yi Fei	4	2	2.00
2	1	Chu Yu	19	8	2.38
3	2	Jia Yi	22	8	2.75
4	3	Sheng Jie	27	8	3.38
5	5	Yue Z.	20	5	4.00
6	6	Yi Lan	18	4	4.50
7	4	Qi	33	7	4.71
8	7	Yu	19	3	6.33
9	9	Yue S.	17	2	8.50
10	10	Yan	10	1	10.00
11-12	11-12	An Qi	—N/a	—N/a	—N/a
11-12	11-12	Ling	—N/a	—N/a	—N/a

=== Photo shoot guide ===
- Episode 4 photo shoot: Glamorous gowns in an ice cellar
- Episode 5 photo shoot: Wahaha water in sportswear
- Episode 6 photo shoot: Wahaha goddesses
- Episode 7 photo shoot: Emotional Moulin Rouge
- Episode 8 commercial: Sichuan tourism
- Episode 8 photo shoot: Phantoms of ancient Chinese princesses
- Episode 9 photo shoot: Army fighters in groups
- Episode 10 photo shoot: Marie Claire covers
- Episode 11 commercial: Wahaha commercial

=== Makeovers ===
- Yu: Cut shorter with blunt ends
- Yi Lan: Cut to chin-length with China doll bangs
- Yue Z.: Mia Farrow inspired pixie cut and dyed dark violet
- Qi: Scruffier and dyed two tones
- Sheng Jie: Bob cut and dyed blonde with one side
- Jia Yi: Long platinum blonde ombre style weave
- Chu Yu: Long bob cut and dyed darker with highlights
