= China's Next Top Model =

Chinese reality television series

- Show logo
- Created by: Tyra Banks
- Starring: Lynn Hung & Zhang Liang (Hosts cycle 5); Lucia Liu; Former: Shang Wenjie (Host cycle 4); Li Ai (Host cycles 1-3); Flora Cheong-Leen; Cheung Man Wah; Sunny Lee
- Country of origin: China
- No. of seasons: 5
- No. of episodes: 56

Production
- Running time: 60 minutes

Original release
- Network: Sichuan Satellite TV (2008-2010); Travel Channel (2013); Chongqing TV (2015)
- Release: January 13, 2008

China's Next Top Model is a Chinese reality TV series, based on the international version and spin-off to the original, America's Next Top Model created by Tyra Banks.

The show was first produced by Chinese television subscription channel Sichuan Satellite TV and was filmed in Shanghai. The castings were held in selected cities of China — Shanghai, Beijing, Chengdu, and Guangzhou. It began airing on January 13, 2008. The first three seasons under Sichuan TV were presented by Chinese supermodel Li Ai.

After a three-year break, the show saw a fourth season premiering on the Chinese Travel Channel, which was hosted by Shang Wenjie. The producers of the show failed to secure the rights for a fifth season on the Travel Channel, and the show was renamed I Supermodel to avoid licensing issues. The official version of the show was renewed once again on a separate channel, Chongqing TV, in 2015. It was the first season of the show to feature male contestants within the cast.

== Judges ==
Judge/Mentor	Cycles				
Judge/Mentor	1 (2008)	2 (2009)	3 (2010)	4 (2013)	5 (2015)
Hosts
Li Ai	Main	Main	Main		
Shang Wenjie				Main	
Lynn Hung					Main
Zhang Liang					Main
Judging Panelists
Flora Cheong-Leen	Main				
Chris Cheung	Main				
Vivienne Tam	Main				
Sunny Lee	Main				
Tony Li		Main	Guest	Main	
Xiao Feng		Main	Guest		
Grace Han			Main		
Sure Yu			Main		
Frankie Han		Guest	Guest	Main	
Qiqi Yam				Main	
Lucia Liu					Main

== Cycles ==
Cycle	Premiere date	Winner	Runner-up	Other contestants in order of elimination	Number of contestants	International Destinations
1	13 January 2008	Yin Ge	Wang Jia	Liu Wen Jing (quit), Bao Jie, Zhang Xiao Pei, Tanya Zy, Wu Mei Ting, Ma Shu Yi, Zhu Feng (quit), Yan Xue Qian	10	Macau
2	9 January 2009	Meng Yao	Mo Jia Qi	Zhang Cai, Li Mou, Hu Lu Lu, Tan Jie, Lili Anna, Zhang Yang, Wang Shan, He Xin	10	None
3	13 June 2010	Mao Chu Yu	Lin Jia Yi	Yan Ling (quit) & Jia An Qi (quit), Zhu Yan, Sun Yue, Zhao Yi Fei (quit), Shi Yu, Chaochang Yi Lan, Zhu Yue, Huang Qi, Wang Sheng Jie	12	None
4	12 October 2013	Wang Xiao Qian	Yu An Qi	Chen Qi & Yin Fang Bing, Xia Fan, Chen Chan Lin, Zong Yi Tong, Dang Zhu Xi (quit), Wang Xiao Ting, Shi Xin Ling, Li Qiao Dan, Zhou Chen Lan, Xie Shu Ya, Hu Huan	14	Seoul
5	21 May 2015	Li Si Jia	Li Xue	Lai Yu Ting & Jiang Ying, Ha Sheng, Xu Meng Ting, Huang Zhen Zhen, Yu Ling Yun & Wang Meng, Teng Tian Long, Yi Chen, Zhao Zhuo Nun, Huang Si Qi, Li Hao Ting, Liu Xian Xia, Wang Ren Chuan	16	London

== See also ==
- I Supermodel
- Asia's Next Top Model
