= China's Next Top Model season 1 =

China's Next Top Model
- Season 1
- No. of episodes: 10

Release
- Original network: Sichuan Satellite TV
- Original release: January 13 – March 23, 2008

Season chronology
- Next → Season 2

China's Next Top Model is a Chinese reality TV series, based on the international version and spin-off to the original, America's Next Top Model.

The show was produced by Chinese television subscription channel Sichuan Satellite TV and it is filmed in Shanghai and Macau, with the casting was held in selected cities of China - Shanghai, Beijing, Chengdu, and Guangzhou. It began airing on January 13, 2008.

Among the prizes for this season was a contract with NEXT Model Management and became the spokesperson for Pantene.

Yin Ge, 21 year old from Changsha, became the first winner of China's Next Top Model.

== Contestants ==
(ages stated are at start of contest)

Contestant	Age	Hometown	Finish	Place
Liu Wen Jing	26	Chongqing	Episode 3	10 (quit)
Bao Jie	21	Anhui	Episode 3	9
Zhang Xiao Pei	20	Shanghai	Episode 4	8
Tanya Zy	28	Belarus	Episode 5	7
Wu Mei Ting	21	Guangzhou	Episode 6	6
Ma Shu Yi	21	Guangzhou	Episode 7	5
Zhu Feng	19	Shanghai	Episode 9	4 (quit)
Yan Xue Qian	19	Shanghai	Episode 10	3
Wang Jia	21	Harbin	Episode 10	2
Yin Ge	21	Changsha	Episode 10	1

== Episodes ==
=== Episode 1 ===
Casting episode.

=== Episode 2 ===
- First call-out: Yin Ge
- Bottom two: Ma Shu Yi & Yan Xue Qian
- Eliminated: Ma Shu Yi

=== Episode 3 ===
- Quit: Liu Wen Jing
- Returned: Ma Shu Yi
- First call-out: Wu Mei Ting
- Bottom two: Bao Jie & Wang Jia
- Eliminated: Bao Jie

=== Episode 4 ===
- First call-out: Yan Xue Qian
- Bottom two: Tanya Zy & Zhang Xiao Pei
- Eliminated: Zhang Xiao Pei

=== Episode 5 ===
- First call-out: Ma Shu Yi
- Bottom two: Tanya Zy & Wu Mei Ting
- Eliminated: Tanya Zy

=== Episode 6 ===
- First call-out: Zhu Feng
- Bottom two: Wang Jia & Wu Mei Ting
- Eliminated: Wu Mei Ting

=== Episode 7 ===
- First call-out: Wang Jia
- Bottom two: Ma Shu Yi & Zhu Feng
- Eliminated: Ma Shu Yi

=== Episode 8 ===
- First call-out: Yin Ge
- Bottom two: Wang Jia & Yan Xue Qian
- Eliminated: Wang Jia

=== Episode 9 ===
- Quit: Zhu Feng
- Returned: Wang Jia
- Eliminated: None

=== Episode 10 ===
- First call-out: Wang Jia
- Bottom two: Yan Xue Qian & Yin Ge
- Eliminated: Yan Xue Qian
- Final two: Wang Jia & Yin Ge
- China's Next Top Model: Yin Ge

== Summaries ==
=== Call-out order ===
Ai's call-out order
Order	Episodes										
Order	1	2	3	4	5	6	7	8	9	10	
1	Mei Ting	Ge	Mei Ting	Xue Qian	Shu Yi	Feng	Jia	Ge	Ge	Jia	Ge
2	Wen Jing	Tanya	Ge	Ge	Jia	Xue Qian	Ge	Feng	Jia	Ge	Jia
3	Ge	Wen Jing	Feng	Feng	Xue Qian	Shu Yi	Xue Qian	Xue Qian	Xue Qian	Xue Qian	
4	Jie	Mei Ting	Shu Yi	Shu Yi	Ge	Ge	Feng	Jia	Feng		
5	Xiao Pei	Xiao Pei	Xue Qian	Mei Ting	Feng	Jia	Shu Yi				
6	Shu Yi	Feng	Tanya	Jia	Mei Ting	Mei Ting					
7	Xue Qian	Jia	Xiao Pei	Tanya	Tanya						
8	Jia	Jie	Jia	Xiao Pei							
9	Tanya	Xue Qian	Jie								
10	Feng	Shu Yi	Wen Jing								

The contestant was eliminated
The contestant was eliminated but allowed to remain in the competition
The contestant quit the competition
The contestant won the competition

- In episode 3, Wen Jing decided to quit the competition, for pregnancy reasons. Shu Yi re-entered the competition to replace her.
- In episode 9, It was revealed that Feng decided quit the competition, after the previous episode ended. She was replaced by Wang Jia, who had been eliminated the previous episode. Additionally, no elimination took place.

=== Bottom Two ===
Episodes	Contestants			Eliminated
2	Shu Yi	&	Xue Qian	Shu Yi
3	Jia	&	Jie	Wen Jing
3	Jia	&	Jie	Jie
4	Tanya	&	Xiao Pei	Xiao Pei
5	Mei Ting	&	Tanya	Tanya
6	Jia	&	Mei Ting	Mei Ting
7	Feng	&	Shu Yi	Shu Yi
8	Jia	&	Xue Qian	Jia
9	None			Feng
10	Ge	&	Xue Qian	Xue Qian
10	Ge	&	Jia	Jia

The contestant was eliminated after their first time in the bottom two
The contestant was eliminated after their second time in the bottom two
The contestant was eliminated after their third time in the bottom two
The contestant quit the competition
The contestant was placed as the runner-up

=== Average call-out order ===
Final two are not included.

Rank by average	Place	Model	Call-out total	Number of call-outs	Call-out average
1	1	Ge	19	9	2.11
2	10	Wen Jing	3	1	3.00
3	4	Feng	24	7	3.42
4	3	Xue Qian	32	9	3.55
5	2	Jia	36	9	4.00
6	6	Mei Ting	22	5	4.40
7	5	Shu Yi	27	6	4.50
8	7	Tanya	22	4	5.50
9	8	Xiao Pei	20	3	6.67
10	9	Jie	17	2	8.50

=== Photo shoot guide ===
- Episode 1 photo shoot: Posing in bikinis
- Episode 2 photo shoot: Magazine covers
- Episode 3 photo shoot: 1930 film sets
- Episode 4 photo shoot: Swimsuits in water
- Episode 5 photo shoot: Old Shanghai singers
- Episode 6 photo shoot: Superheroes
- Episode 7 photo shoot: Olympic symbols
- Episode 8 photo shoot & commercial: Pantene Clinicare
- Episode 9 photo shoot: MGM Grand Macau
- Episode 10 photo shoots: MGM Grand Macau; self-directed

=== Makeovers ===
- Xiao Pei: Layered and dyed dark red
- Tanya: Volumized waves and dyed light brown
- Mei Ting: Bob cut and dyed brown
- Shu Yi: Trimmed and volumized curls
- Feng: Cut shorter and dyed dark brown
- Xue Qian: Layered bob cut and dyed dark brown
- Wang Jia: Shoulder-length bob
- Ge: Long straight black extensions
