= Chen Ran =

Chinese avant-garde writer

- 陈染
- Born: April 1962 (age 64); Beijing, China
- Education: Beijing Normal University
- Occupations: Short story writer, literary critic, essayist
- Writing career
- Language: Chinese
- Period: 1986–present
- Notable work: Private Life

Chen Ran (simplified Chinese: 陈染; traditional Chinese: 陳染; pinyin: Chén Rǎn; born 1962) is a Chinese avant-garde writer. Most of her works appeared in the 1990s and often deal with Chinese feminism.

== Biography ==
Chen Ran was born in Beijing in April, 1962. Her parents divorced when she was in high school and she since then lived with her mother. As a child she studied music, but when she was 18 her interests turned to literature.

Chen Ran studied Chinese language and literature in Beijing Normal University from 1982 to 1986 and graduated when she was 23. She remained with the university as a teacher after graduation for the next four and a half years. She also lectured as an exchange scholar at various foreign universities including Melbourne University in Australia, the University of Berlin in Germany, and London, Oxford, and Edinburgh universities in the UK. Between 1987 and 1989, she published a series of surrealistic short stories with strong philosophical undertones.

She now lives and writes in Beijing. She has published several short story collections and is a member of the Chinese Writers Association. She has won number of prizes, such as the first Contemporary China Female Writer's Award.

== Work ==
Chen Ran's stories received great attention from feminine critics as well as general publishers in the cultural market during the 1990s. Chinese feminist critics praise the gender consciousness of her work and the introduction into literature of the private female experience, including lesbian love (or affection, as Ran prefers to call it), the Electra complex, and the mother-daughter relationship.

The publication of her first novel, Private Life, in 1996 caused heated debate in Chinese literary circles. As a result of her writing style, which is very personal and open, some critics have found her writing to be too exploitative of the new mass consumer market.

The film Yesterday's Wine, based on her short story of the same name, was chosen for showing at the Fourth World Conference on Women, held in Beijing in 1995.

== Controversy ==
Chen Ran is the most-discussed figure in the recent critical debate in China over "female writing" and "individual writing". Even though the government has never banned her books, a thinly veiled moralism pervades the literary critical approach to her work. Critics writing in academic journals have accused her of zilian (narcissism) and zibi (solipsism). For example, some critics write off her book, Private Life, as mere exhibitionism (i.e., the willing exposure of privacy) because Chen openly admits to writing from experience.

== Publications ==
- Let's Pay the Piper for the Past (與往事乾杯; Yǔ wǎngshì gānbēi), 2001.
- Potential Anecdote (qianxing yishi)
- Standing up, Alone, Facing the Air Current (zhan zai wu ren de fengkou)
- The Witch and the Door of her Dreams (wu nü yu ta de meng zhong zhi men)
- Troglodyte House (kongdong zhi tuo)
- Nine Months without Going out for the Bald Woman (tutou nü zou bu chu lai de jiu yue)
- Birth of an Empty Man (kong xin ren de dansheng)
- Private Life (私人生活; Sīrén shēnghuó), 1996.
