= Chongqing Broadcasting Group =

Chinese broadcasting company

Chongqing Broadcasting Group 重庆广播电视集团
- Type: Broadcast
- Country: China
- Availability: Chongqing and Sichuan, People's Republic of China
- Official website: v.cbg.cn

Chongqing Broadcasting Group (CBG; Chinese: 重庆广播电视集团; pinyin: Chóngqìng Guǎngbō Diànshì Jítuán) is a state-owned television network based in the city of Chongqing in southwestern China. Established in 1981, Chongqing Television has been the leading broadcasting network in Chongqing and its affiliated counties and districts. After Chongqing became a direct-controlled municipality in 1997, Chongqing Television became the official TV program to represent and propagate the cultures and development of Chongqing. Chongqing Television became a subdivision of Chongqing Broadcasting Group (along with People's Radio Broadcasting Station of Chongqing and many other subdivisions) in 2004 with a headquarter in Jiulongpo District. Its main channel, CTV (formerly CQTV) is carried on cable systems in urban areas throughout mainland China and is available nationwide on both analogue and digital satellites.

== List of CBG channels ==
Chongqing Broadcasting Group currently provides more than ten TV channels, and most of those channels are broadcast in the Municipality of Chongqing. The flagship channel of Chongqing Television, Chongqing Satellite Television Channel or CQTV-1, is broadcast in more than 25 provinces in mainland China. The international channel has oversea broadcasts.

Channel number	Programs	Note
CQTV	General	Broadcast in many other provinces
CQTV-1	Movies and TV Series	
CQTV-2	Local news	
CQTV-3	Natural and social sciences, education, documentaries	
CQTV-4	Lifestyles and fashion in Chongqing	
CQTV-5	Arts, Sports and Entertainment	
CQTV-6	Shopping, recreation, real estate, business	
CQTV-7	Sitcoms	Defunct, most programs merged into CQTV-Fashion
--	Fashion shows, local sitcoms, local cultures	Have a special version for Guangdong
CQTV-8	Rural cultures of Chongqing, agriculture, laws, tourism	
--	Cartoons, Children and Teenager variety, Classic foreign movies	
--	News, Tourism and Culture	Oversea broadcasting
--	Model clothes	Defunct since 2015
--	Automobile	Known as China Auto Channel, a leading Automobile TV channel in China
--	Scenic views and tourism	
--	Finance and Economy	
--	General	Broadcasting on public transportation

== CBG talent show controversy ==
On 15 August 2007, a CBG talent show was suspended following criticism from the State Administration of Radio, Film and Television (SARFT). The show, titled First Heartthrob (Chinese: 第一次心动; pinyin: dìyīcì xīndòng) was condemned for "stunts and sensationalism". CQTV has been ordered to take disciplinary measures against relevant staff. The programme is one of many idol-style shows carried on Chinese provincial stations, in an attempt to emulate the success of Super Girl. This particular show also includes elements of reality television programmes like Big Brother.

According to Chinese media reports, programme director Zhou Zhishun claimed that the suspension was due to an incident on Friday 12 August, when contestant-judges clashes resulted in tears. He is reported to have said, "This sudden event caused a loss of control on the set, and hence the restructuring was requested by SARFT." There may also be a political element: the Administration urged other broadcasters to "voluntarily abide by political discipline and propaganda discipline", and the AP news agency linked this with the upcoming 17th Party Congress.

SARFT's action has received praise from some Chinese commentators. Chang Ping, an editor in the popular Southern Metropolis Daily, wrote "After Chongqing TV's First Heartthrob (第一次心动), similar programs Guangdong TV's Date With Beauty (美丽新约) and Shenzhen TV's Super Date (超级情感对对碰) were ordered to stop broadcasting. In the eyes of viewers, they all share one quality: vulgarity... [SARFT] has won wide acclaim. According to the results of a survey by China Youth Daily's survey center, 96.4% of those respondents who were aware of what First Heartthrob was cast their vote in support of SARFT's action."
