= China's Next Top Model season 4 =

China's Next Top Model
- Season 4
- No. of episodes: 12

Release
- Original network: Travel Channel
- Original release: October 12 – December 28, 2013

Season chronology
- ← Previous; Season 3 Next → Season 5

China's Next Top Model season 4 (also referred to as "cycle 4") is the fourth installment of the Chinese Reality TV series China's Next Top Model which is a spin-off of America's Next Top Model. The series began airing on television on October 12, 2013.

The prizes for this cycle were a contract to host China's Travel Channel, a contract with 2pm Model Management, an appearance on the cover of Grazia China, a cash prize of RMB1,000,000 (USD161401), a two-week all-expenses-paid trip to Europe, the opportunity to walk in Paris Fashion Week in 2014, and a wide variety of gifts worth a total of RMB 500,000 from the show's sponsors.

The winner was 21-year-old Wang Xiao Qian.

== Contestants ==
(ages stated are at start of contest)

Contestant	Age	Height	Finish	Rank
Chen Qi	25	1.78 m (5 ft 10 in)	Episode 1	14–13
Yin Fang Bing	23	1.80 m (5 ft 11 in)	Episode 1	14–13
Xia Fan	19	1.81 m (5 ft 11 1/2 in)	Episode 2	12
Chen Chan Lin	19	1.79 m (5 ft 10 1/2 in)	Episode 3	11
Zong Yi Tong	22	1.73 m (5 ft 8 in)	Episode 4	10
Dang Zhu Xi	20	1.73 m (5 ft 8 in)	Episode 5	9 (quit)
Wang Xiao Ting	21	1.81 m (5 ft 11 1/2 in)	Episode 5	8
Shi Xin Ling	19	1.77 m (5 ft 9 1/2 in)	Episode 7	7
Li Qiao Dan	23	1.80 m (5 ft 11 in)	Episode 8	6
Zhou Chen Lan	25	1.77 m (5 ft 9 1/2 in)	Episode 9	5
Xie Shu Ya	19	1.80 m (5 ft 11 in)	Episode 12	4
Hu Huan	21	1.77 m (5 ft 9 1/2 in)	Episode 12	3
Yu An Qi	22	1.78 m (5 ft 10 in)	Episode 12	2
Wang Xiao Qian	21	1.81 m (5 ft 11 1/2 in)	Episode 12	1

Wang Xiao Ting and Wang Xiao Qian are identical twin sisters. However, they competed individually.

== Episodes ==
=== Episode 1 ===
First aired: October 12, 2013

The 14 girls move into the model house where they fight for 12 beds in the house. Yin Fang Bing and Li Qiao Dan lost. Ultimately, Yu An Qi and Zong Yi Tong offered to share with them.

For the challenge, the girls learn how to walk on the runway. Yu An Qi won the challenge, and her prize was an RMB 20,000 prize package containing a luxury bag, Gucci sunglasses, and clothing.

For this week's photo shoot, the girls had a Winter Olympics-themed shoot in the ice room of the Beijing I Sweep Curling Club.

- First call-out: Yu An Qi
- Bottom three: Chen Qi, Xie Shu Ya, and Yin Fang Bing
- Eliminated: Chen Qi and Yin Fang Bing
- Photographer: Hua Yuan

=== Episode 2 ===
First aired: October 19, 2013

The twelve girls receive makeovers and compete in a runway challenge where the top nine girls would be able to walk in a "Bread n Butter" fashion show. Zong Yi Tong, Xia Fan, and Zhou Chen Lan lost the challenge and watched the other girls walk in the fashion show.

The girls later re-created famous Chinese beauty shots for their photo shoot of the week.

- First call-out: Wang Xiao Qian
- Bottom two: Xia Fan and Zong Yi Tong
- Eliminated: Xia Fan
- Photographer: Zhang Hao Ran

=== Episode 3 ===
First aired: October 26, 2013

The eleven girls have a fancy dinner with judge Zheng Yuan Chang. Afterwards, they go to a hutong, where they compete in this week's challenge.

The girls split into four teams. Each team composes and shoots three street shots with foreigners in under 15 minutes.

- Team 1: Shi Xin Ling, Wang Xiao Qian, and Wang Xiao Ting
- Team 2: Chen Chan Lin, Yu An Qi, and Chen Lan
- Team 3: Dang Zhu Xi, Li Qiao Dan, and Zong Yi Tong
- Team 4: Hu Huan and Xie Shu Ya

Team 2 had the best picture, but the winner was Team 1. Members of Team 1 shared a RMB 20,000 prize package from i-xiu.com and each one received a watch from Galtiscopio.

The girls went to a desert in the Shapotou District in Ningxia, where they had to wear swimsuits and work with male models for the photo shoot of the week.

- First call-out: Shi Xin Ling
- Bottom two: Wang Xiao Ting and Chen Chan Lin
- Eliminated: Chen Chan Lin
- Photographer: Kevin

=== Episode 4 ===
First aired: November 2, 2013

The next morning, the remaining 10 girls found out they were going on a Royal Caribbean International luxury cruise trip to South Korea for three days.

The girls arrived at Myeong-dong in the Jung District, Seoul, where they had their first challenge. The girls received ₩100,000 (about RMB 573.30) and had 15 minutes to buy one vacation-themed accessory. Afterwards, they returned to the cruise ship where they walked a runway wearing swimsuits and modeled with the accessory they bought. Qiao Dan won the best accessory.

The girls participate in a second challenge, where they repeat the runway show from the first challenge but in front of the cruise staff. Additionally, they had to coordinate a dance with a professional dancer at the end of the runway. The cruise staff voted for which model they thought walked and danced the best. Qiao Dan won the second challenge. For winning both challenges, Qiao Dan received a RMB 20,000 gift card to shop at Galeries Lafayette.

The girls return to Beijing, where they had their photo shoot of the week. The photos from this shoot were published in the January 2014 issue of China's Self magazine. Model-turned-designer Alina tells the girls that Pandora's Box was the theme of the shoot and that they will be modeling her Ali-Hang haute couture collection. The focus of the episode was posing, so the girls were asked to create strong, long, lean, fairy-like poses for this shoot.

- Photographer: Chen Bo Yu
- First call-out: Shi Xin Ling
- Bottom two: Chen Lan and Zong Yi Tong
- Eliminated: Zong Yi Tong

=== Episode 5 ===
First aired: November 9, 2013

The nine girls meet actress Fan Wen Fang and receive an acting lesson. The girls are paired up, with each of them speaking a phrase to their partner in their given role. Afterwards, the girls dress up as a variety of housewives and act out a scene where they must say they are China's Next Top Model.

The girls then had their challenge of the week, where the girls had to create a breast cancer commercial for the Aimer Foundation. The nine girls were split up into three teams. The criteria were that they had to be topless, must use three keywords, and must write, direct, and act their commercial together in 15 minutes.

- Team 1: Dang Zhu Xi, Li Qiao Dan, and Wang Xiao Ting
- Team 2: Hu Huan, Wang Xiao Qian, and Yu An Qi
- Team 3: Shi Xin Ling, Xie Shu Ya, and Chen Lan

Team 1 went first, and Zhu Xi was criticized for not doing enough in her segment. Team 2 went second, and Huan and An Qi were criticized for being too cold. Team 3 went last, and was criticized for not using keywords under Shu Ya's direction; Xin Ling was also criticized for overthinking her segment. Overall, the winner of the challenge was Team 1. Their prize was a gift bag containing clothes from Galeries Lafayette worth RMB 30,000 split among the three of them.

Next, the girls model as vintage American housewives, alluding to Desperate Housewives, for their photo shoot of the week. Their photos were published in the 12th issue of the magazine L'Officiel China. The girls were split into groups, and each group was given a scene to act out.

- Rich beauty queens doing each other's make-up: Wang Xiao Qian and Wang Xiao Ting
- Haughty housewives competing with each other: Hu Huan and Yu An Qi
- Heartbroken housewife complaining to impatient housewife doing chores: Dang Zhu Xi and Li Qiao Dan
- Two gossiping housewives with angry housewife overhearing them: Shi Xin Ling, Xie Shu Ya, and Zhuo Chen Lan

After the photo shoot, the girls found out the episode was a double elimination. At the judging, Xin Ling was absent because of her health, but later recovers and joins the girls in the judging room. When put up for judging, Zhu Xi quit the competition to go back to school. As a result, only one more would be eliminated.

- Photographer: Zhang Xi
- First call-out: Yu An Qi
- Bottom two: Li Qiao Dan and Wang Xiao Ting
- Eliminated: Wang Xiao Ting

=== Episode 6 ===
First aired: November 16, 2013

This episode is a finale runway special where all 14 finalists are shown walking in the final runway show. Tyra Banks is also present at this final runway to help China's NTM's host and judges decide on the winner. No winner deliberation is shown, and there is no elimination.

=== Episode 7 ===
First aired: November 23, 2013

- First call-out: Li Qiao Dan
- Bottom two: Shi Xin Ling and Xie Shu Ya
- Eliminated: Shi Xin Ling

For the photoshoot of the week, the girls had to dress in the theme of underwater goddesses.

=== Episode 8 ===
First aired: November 30, 2013

- First call-out: Wang Xiao Qian
- Bottom two: Li Qiao Dan & Yu An Qi
- Eliminated: Li Qiao Dan

This week's photoshoot includes animals.

=== Episode 9 ===
First aired: December 7, 2013

- First call-out: Wang Xiao Qian
- Bottom two: Yu An Qi and Chen lan
- Eliminated: Chen lan

This week's photoshoot includes the girls in a lingerie inspired by Chinese opera.

=== Episode 10 ===
First aired: December 14, 2013

- First call-out: Hu Huan
- Bottom two: Xie Shu Ya & Yu An Qi
- Eliminated: None

In Episode 10, there were two photoshoots: a cliff editorial and a black-and-white beach photo.

=== Episode 11 ===
First aired: December 21, 2013

This episode recaps the previous episodes.

=== Episode 12 ===
First aired: December 28, 2013

- First eliminated: Xie Shu Ya
- Second eliminated: Hu Huan
- Final two: Wang Xiao Qian & Yu An Qi
- China's Next Top Model: Wang Xiao Qian

In Episode 12, the girls were in a cover of Grazia.

== Summaries ==
=== Call-out order ===
Wen Jie's call-out order
Order	Episodes									
Order	1	2	3	4	5	7	8	9	10	12
1	An Qi	Xiao Qian	Xin Ling	Xin Ling	An Qi	Qiao Dan	Xiao Qian	Xiao Qian	Huan	Xiao Qian
2	Huan	Xin Ling	Qiao Dan	Qiao Dan	Xiao Qian	Chen Lan	Chen Lan	Huan	Xiao Qian	An Qi
3	Zhu Xi	Qiao Dan	Zhu Xi	Huan	Huan	Huan	Shu Ya	Shu Ya	An Qi; Shu Ya	Huan
4	Xiao Ting	Xiao Ting	Huan	An Qi	Shu Ya	Xiao Qian	Huan	An Qi	An Qi; Shu Ya	Shu Ya
5	Chen Lan	Huan	Yi Tong	Zhu Xi	Xin Ling	An Qi	An Qi	Chen Lan		
6	Xiao Qian	Shu Ya	An Qi	Xiao Ting	Chen Lan	Shu Ya	Qiao Dan			
7	Xin Ling	An Qi	Xiao Qian	Shu Ya	Qiao Dan	Xin Ling				
8	Qiao Dan	Zhu Xi	Shu Ya	Xiao Qian	Xiao Ting					
9	Fan	Chan Lin	Chen Lan	Chen Lan	Zhu Xi					
10	Chan Lin	Chen Lan	Xiao Ting	Yi Tong						
11	Yi Tong	Yi Tong	Chan Lin							
12	Shu Ya	Fan								
13/14	Fang Bing; Qi									

The contestant was eliminated
The contestant quit the competition
The contestant was part of a non-elimination bottom two
The contestant won the competition

- In episode 1, Shu Ya, Fang Bing, and Qi landed in the bottom three. Shang Wen Jie handed the final photograph to Shu Ya, eliminating the other two contestants.
- In episode 5, Zhu Xi quit the competition during judging.
- Episode 6 was a special episode; the final runway was shown. The winner was not revealed until the final episode, after the regular competition resumed.
- In episode 10, An Qi and Shu Ya landed in the bottom two. None of them were eliminated.
- Episode 11 was the recap episode.

=== Bottom two ===
Episodes	Contestants			Eliminated
1	Fang Bing	Qi	Shu Ya	Fang Bing
1	Fang Bing	Qi	Shu Ya	Qi
2	Fan	&	Yi Tong	Fan
3	Chan Lin	&	Xiao Ting	Chan Lin
4	Chen Lan	&	Yi Tong	Yi Tong
5	Qiao Dan	&	Xiao Ting	Zhu Xi
5	Qiao Dan	&	Xiao Ting	Xiao Ting
7	Shu Ya	&	Xin Ling	Xin Ling
8	An Qi	&	Qiao Dan	Qiao Dan
9	An Qi	&	Chen Lan	Chen Lan
10	An Qi	&	Shu Ya	None
12	An Qi, Huan, Shu Ya, Xiao Qian			Shu Ya
12	An Qi	Huan	Xiao Qian	Huan
12	An Qi	&	Xiao Qian	An Qi

The contestant was eliminated after their first time in the bottom two
The contestant was eliminated after their second time in the bottom two
The contestant quit the competition
The contestant was eliminated and placed fourth
The contestant was eliminated and placed third
The contestant was placed as the runner-up

=== Average call-out order ===
Final two are not included.

Rank by average	Place	Model	Call-out total	Number of call-outs	Call-out average
1	3	Huan	27	9	3.00
2	6	Qiao Dan	24	7	3.42
3	1	Xiao Qian	32	9	3.55
4	2	An Qi	36	9	4.00
5	7	Xin Ling	23	6	4.71
6	9	Zhu Xi	19	4	4.75
7	4	Shu Ya	52	9	5.77
8	5	Chen Lan	48	8	6.00
9	8	Xiao Ting	32	5	6.40
10	10	Yi Tong	37	4	9.25
11	11	Chan Lin	30	3	10.00
12	12	Fan	21	2	10.50
13-14	13-14	An Qi	13	1	13.00
13-14	13-14	Ling	13	1	13.00
