= List of West German films of 1953 =

List of films produced in Germany in 1953

List of West German films of 1953. This was the fourth full year of film production since the formal partition of Germany into East and West in 1949. Major production centres were gathered in Hamburg, Munich and West Berlin. A number of co-productions were made between West Germany and Austria.

== A–L ==
Title	Director	Cast	Genre	Notes
Anna Louise and Anton	Thomas Engel	Paul Klinger, Hertha Feiler, Sabine Eggerth	Comedy	Co-production with Austria
Arena of Death	Kurt Meisel	Richard Häussler, Katharina Mayberg, Friedl Hardt	Crime	Co-production with Austria
Arlette Conquers Paris	Viktor Tourjansky	Johanna Matz, Karlheinz Böhm, Karlheinz Böhm	Comedy	Co-production with France
As Long as You're Near Me	Harald Braun	Maria Schell, O.W. Fischer, Hardy Krüger	Drama	Entered into the 1954 Cannes Film Festival
Aunt Jutta from Calcutta	Karl Georg Külb	Viktor Staal, Ida Wüst, Ingrid Lutz	Comedy	
Ave Maria	Alfred Braun	Zarah Leander, Marianne Hold, Marianne Hold	Drama	
The Bachelor Trap	Fritz Böttger	Oskar Sima, Rudolf Platte, Maria Andergast	Comedy	
Beloved Life	Rolf Thiele	Ruth Leuwerik, Carl Raddatz, Albert Lieven	Drama	
The Bird Seller	Arthur Maria Rabenalt	Ilse Werner, Wolf Albach-Retty, Eva Probst	Musical	
The Blue Hour	Veit Harlan	Kristina Söderbaum, Hans Nielsen, Kurt Kreuger	Comedy	
The Bogeyman	Carl Boese	Liselotte Pulver, Hans Reiser, Harald Paulsen	Comedy	
Captain Bay-Bay	Helmut Käutner	Hans Albers, Lotte Koch, Renate Mannhardt	Musical comedy	
The Chaplain of San Lorenzo	Gustav Ucicky	Willy Birgel, Dieter Borsche, Gertrud Kückelmann	Drama	
The Charming Young Lady	Georg Thomalla	Georg Thomalla, Herta Staal, Gisela Fackeldey	Musical	
Christina	Fritz Eichler	Barbara Rütting, Lutz Moik, Franziska Kinz	Drama	
Come Back	Alfred Braun	Winnie Markus, Rudolf Prack, Hans Stüwe	Drama	
The Cousin from Nowhere	Karl Anton	Vera Molnár, Gerhard Riedmann, Grethe Weiser	Musical	
The Dancing Heart	Wolfgang Liebeneiner	Gertrud Kückelmann, Gunnar Möller, Herta Staal	Musical comedy	
Dark Clouds Over the Dachstein	Anton Kutter	Gisela Fackeldey, Marianne Koch, Eduard Köck	Drama	Co-production with Austria
The Daughter of the Regiment	Géza von Bolváry, Goffredo Alessandrini	Antonella Lualdi, Hannelore Schroth, Isa Barzizza	Comedy	Co-production with Italy
Diary of a Married Woman	Josef von Báky	Maria Schell, O.W. Fischer, Margarete Haagen	Comedy	
The Divorcée	George Jacoby	Marika Rökk, Johannes Heesters, Hans Nielsen	Musical	
Don't Forget Love	Paul Verhoeven	Luise Ullrich, Paul Dahlke, Will Quadflieg	Comedy	
Dreaming Lips	Josef von Báky	Maria Schell, O.W. Fischer, Philip Dorn	Drama	
Dutch Girl	Johann Alexander Hübler-Kahla	Sonja Ziemann, Gunnar Möller, Hans Moser	Musical comedy	
Elephant Fury	Harry Piel	Harry Piel, Dorothea Wieck, Hans Zesch-Ballot	Thriller	
The Empress of China	Steve Sekely	Grethe Weiser, Nadja Tiller, Ernst Waldow	Comedy	
Everything for Father	Karl Hartl	Johanna Matz, Curd Jürgens, Olga Chekhova	Comedy	
Fanfare of Marriage	Hans Grimm	Dieter Borsche, Georg Thomalla, Inge Egger	Comedy	
Father Is Being Stupid	Johannes Haussler	Otto Gebühr, Camilla Horn, Herbert Hübner	Comedy	
The Flower of Hawaii	Géza von Cziffra	Maria Litto, Rudolf Platte, Rudolf Platte	Musical	
Have Sunshine in Your Heart	Erich Waschneck	Carl Wery, Liselotte Pulver, Otto Gebühr	Drama	
Heartbroken on the Moselle	Kurt Hoffmann	Will Quadflieg, Elisabeth Müller, Renate Mannhardt	Romance	
A Heart Plays False	Rudolf Jugert	O.W. Fischer, Ruth Leuwerik, Carl Wery	Drama	
His Royal Highness	Harald Braun	Dieter Borsche, Ruth Leuwerik, Lil Dagover	Comedy	
Hit Parade	Erik Ode	Germaine Damar, Nadja Tiller, Walter Giller	Musical	
Hocuspocus	Kurt Hoffmann	Curt Goetz, Valerie von Martens, Hans Nielsen	Comedy	
Hooray, It's a Boy!	Ernst Marischka	Theo Lingen, Ingrid Lutz, Walter Müller	Comedy	
I and You	Alfred Weidenmann	Hardy Krüger, Liselotte Pulver, Doris Kirchner	Comedy	
The Immortal Vagabond	Arthur Maria Rabenalt	Karlheinz Böhm, Hans Olden, Elise Aulinger	Comedy	
Jonny Saves Nebrador	Rudolf Jugert	Hans Albers, Margot Hielscher, Trude Hesterberg	Adventure	
Josef the Chaste	Carl Boese	Ludwig Schmitz, Waltraut Haas, Renate Mannhardt	Comedy	
Die Jungfrau auf dem Dach	Otto Preminger	Hardy Krüger, Johannes Heesters, Johanna Matz	Comedy	American production
Knall and Fall as Detectives	Hans Heinrich	Hans Richter, Rudolf Carl, Ingrid Lutz	Comedy	Co-production with Austria
Lady's Choice	E. W. Emo	Georg Thomalla, Grethe Weiser, Willy Fritsch	Comedy	
The Last Waltz	Arthur Maria Rabenalt	Eva Bartok, Curd Jürgens, Christl Mardayn	Musical	
Lavender	Arthur Maria Rabenalt	Gretl Schörg, Karl Schönböck, Hans Holt	Comedy	Co-production with Austria
Life Begins at Seventeen	Paul Martin	Sonja Ziemann, Paul Hubschmid, Anne-Marie Blanc	Romance	
Little Red Riding Hood	Fritz Genschow	Werner Stock, Rita-Maria Nowottnick	Family	
Love's Awakening	Hans Heinrich	Winnie Markus, Ingrid Andree, Carl Esmond	Drama	

== M–Z ==
Title	Director	Cast	Genre	Notes
Mailman Mueller	John Reinhardt	Heinz Rühmann, Heli Finkenzeller, Wolfgang Condrus	Comedy	
Marriage for One Night	Viktor Tourjansky	Gustav Fröhlich, Hannelore Bollmann, Adrian Hoven	Comedy	
Marriage Strike	Joe Stöckel	Erich Auer, Lore Frisch, Elise Aulinger	Comedy	
Martin Luther	Irving Pichel	Niall MacGinnis, Pierre Lefevre	Biography	Co-production with United States
Mask in Blue	Georg Jacoby	Marika Rökk, Paul Hubschmid, Wilfried Seyferth	Musical	
The Mill in the Black Forest	Hermann Kugelstadt	Edith Mill, Helmuth Schneider, Fritz Rasp	Drama	
The Monastery's Hunter	Harald Reinl	Marianne Koch, Paul Hartmann, Erich Auer	Historical drama	
Music by Night	Kurt Hoffmann	Paul Hubschmid, Gertrud Kückelmann, Curd Jürgens	Comedy	
A Musical War of Love	Karl Hartl	Marte Harell, Johannes Heesters, Paul Kemp	Comedy	
Must We Get Divorced?	Hans Schweikart	Hardy Krüger, Ruth Leuwerik, Tilda Thamar	Comedy	
The Night Without Morals	Ferdinand Dörfler	Claude Farell, Gustav Knuth, Lucie Englisch	Comedy	
No Way Back	Victor Vicas	Ivan Desny, Ruth Niehaus, René Deltgen	Drama	
Not Afraid of Big Animals	Ulrich Erfurth	Heinz Rühmann, Ingeborg Körner, Gustav Knuth	Comedy	
Once I Will Return	Géza von Bolváry	Paul Dahlke, Helene Stanley, Adelheid Seeck	Comedy	
Open Your Window	Anton Kutter	Peter Pasetti, Ilse Peternell, Hans Olden	Comedy	Co-production with Austria
The Poacher	Alfred Lehner	Renate Mannhardt, Wastl Witt, Marianne Schönauer	Drama	Co-production with Austria
The Postponed Wedding Night	Karl Georg Külb	Margot Hielscher, Theo Lingen, Viktor Staal	Comedy	
The Private Secretary	Paul Martin	Sonja Ziemann, Rudolf Prack, Paul Hörbiger	Comedy	
Prosecutor Corda	Karl Ritter	Paul Klinger, Eva Probst, Erika von Thellmann	Drama	
Red Roses, Red Lips, Red Wine	Paul Martin	Gardy Granass, John van Dreelen, Lil Dagover	Drama	
The Rose of Stamboul	Karl Anton	Inge Egger, Albert Lieven, Grethe Weiser	Musical	
Salto Mortale	Viktor Tourjansky	Margot Hielscher, Philip Dorn, Karlheinz Böhm	Drama	
Scandal at the Girls' School	Erich Kobler	Walter Giller, Marianne Koch, Günther Lüders	Comedy	
Secretly Still and Quiet	Hans Deppe	Gretl Schörg, Hans Nielsen, Theo Lingen	Comedy	
The Singing Hotel	Géza von Cziffra	Hans Söhnker, Rudolf Platte, Ursula Justin	Musical	
Southern Nights	Robert A. Stemmle	Margit Saad, Erwin Strahl, Waltraut Haas	Musical	
Stars Over Colombo	Veit Harlan	Kristina Söderbaum, Willy Birgel, Adrian Hoven	Adventure	
Street Serenade	Werner Jacobs	Vico Torriani, Sybil Werden, Otto Gebühr	Musical comedy	
The Stronger Woman	Wolfgang Liebeneiner	Gertrud Kückelmann, Antje Weisgerber, Hans Söhnker	Drama	
Such a Charade	Erik Ode	Josefin Kipper, Joachim Brennecke, Heli Finkenzeller	Comedy	
They Call It Love	John Reinhardt	Winnie Markus, Curd Jürgens, Richard Häussler	Comedy	
To Be Without Worries	Georg Marischka	Hans Moser, Nadja Tiller, Walter Müller	Historical comedy	Co-production with Austria
The Uncle from America	Carl Boese	Hans Moser, Georg Thomalla, Grethe Weiser	Comedy	
Under the Stars of Capri	Otto Linnekogel	Hanna Rucker, Helmuth Schneider, Wera Frydtberg	Romantic comedy	
The Village Under the Sky	Richard Häussler	Inge Egger, Robert Freitag, Renate Mannhardt	Drama	
Wedding in Transit	Paul Verhoeven	Karlheinz Böhm, Gardy Granass, Gert Fröbe	Comedy	
We'll Talk About Love Later	Karl Anton	Gustav Fröhlich, Maria Holst, Liselotte Pulver	Comedy	
When the White Lilacs Bloom Again	Hans Deppe	Willy Fritsch, Magda Schneider, Romy Schneider	Drama	
When The Village Music Plays on Sunday Nights	Rudolf Schündler	Rudolf Prack, Ingeborg Körner, Walter Müller	Romance	
Young Heart Full of Love	Paul May	Hans Brenner, Lore Frisch, Heinrich Gretler	Drama	
Your Heart Is My Homeland	Richard Häussler	Inge Egger, Erwin Strahl, Viktor Staal	Drama	Co-production with Austria

== Bibliography ==
- Davidson, John & Hake, Sabine. Framing the Fifties: Cinema in a Divided Germany. Berghahn Books, 2007.
- Fehrenbach, Heide. Cinema in Democratizing Germany: Reconstructing National Identity After Hitler. University of North Carolina Press, 1995.

== See also ==
- List of Austrian films of 1953
- List of East German films of 1953
