= The Bird Seller =

The Bird Seller may refer to:

- Der Vogelhändler, an operetta by Carl Zeller
- The Bird Seller (1935 film), a German musical comedy film
- The Bird Seller (1953 film), a West German musical film
- The Bird Seller (1962 film), a West German musical comedy film
