= Die Christel von der Post =

1956 film

- Directed by: Karl Anton
- Written by: Franz Marischka
- Produced by: Kurt Ulrich
- Cinematography: Willi Sohm
- Edited by: Annemarie Rokoss
- Music by: Werner Müller
- Production company: Berolina Film
- Distributed by: Constantin Film
- Release date: 1956
- Running time: 103 minutes
- Country: West Germany
- Language: German

Die Christel von der Post is a 1956 West German film directed by Karl Anton.

The film is also known as Der Vogelhaendler (German title in Belgium).

== Plot summary ==
The title refers to the leading character, the post mistress Christel, in Carl Zeller's 1891 operetta Der Vogelhändler.

== Cast ==
- Gardy Granass as Christel Werner, post mistress
- Hardy Krüger as Horst Arndt, assistant police detective
- Claus Biederstaedt as Mecky Doppler
- Paul Hörbiger as Ferdinand Brenneis, hotel owner
- Hannelore Bollmann as Rita Hohenfeld
- Gunther Philipp as Poldi Blaha
- Carla Hagen as Ruth Bornemann, post mistress
- Lotte Rausch as Ella Lenz, inn keeper
- Ludwig Manfred Lommel as Prof. Hummel, botanist
- Karl Hellmer as Pelzer, hotel porter
- Stanislav Ledinek as Antonio, owner of a beer garden
- Hilde von Stolz as Anni Klewinski
- Oscar Sabo as Klabuschke
- Wulf Rittscher as Klewinski, general direktor
- Hans Schwarz Jr. as Franz, valet
- Erna Haffner
- Bruno W. Pantel as Otto
- Carl Wery as Egon Hanke, police detective
- Rias Tanzorchester as themselves

== Soundtrack ==
- "Das will der Papa nicht verstehn (Musik von heute)" (Music by Werner Müller, lyrics by Hans Bradtke)
- "Das ist typisch italienisch" (Music by Werner Müller, lyrics by Hans Bradtke)
- "Schreib es mir tausendmal" (Music by Werner Müller, lyrics by Hans Bradtke)

== See also ==
- The Bird Seller (1935)
- Roses in Tyrol (1940)
- The Bird Seller (1953)
- The Bird Seller (1962)
