= Roses in Tyrol =

1940 film directed by Géza von Bolváry

- Film poster
- German: Rosen in Tirol
- Directed by: Géza von Bolváry
- Written by: Ernst Marischka; Moritz West (libretto); Ludwig Held (libretto)
- Produced by: Alf Teichs; Viktor von Struwe
- Starring: Hans Moser; Marte Harell; Johannes Heesters
- Cinematography: Willy Winterstein
- Edited by: Alice Ludwig
- Music by: Franz Grothe; Carl Zeller (operetta)
- Production company: Terra Film
- Distributed by: Terra Film
- Release date: 5 December 1940
- Running time: 100 minutes
- Country: Germany
- Language: German

Roses in Tyrol (German: Rosen in Tirol) is a 1940 German musical comedy film directed by Géza von Bolváry and starring Hans Moser, Marte Harell, and Johannes Heesters. It is based on the 1891 operetta The Bird Seller by Carl Zeller, which has been turned into several films.

The film's sets were designed by the art directors Robert Herlth and Heinrich Weidemann. It was filmed in Prague and Zell am See in the Austrian state of Salzburg.

It was a popular hit and was re-released by Gloria Film in 1950.

== Cast ==
- Hans Moser as Wiesel
- Marte Harell as Marie von Lichtenberg
- Johannes Heesters as Count Herbert von Waldendorf
- Hans Holt as Adam
- Theo Lingen as Leberle
- Theodor Danegger as Heinrich Dagobert von Lichtenberg
- Leo Slezak as Baron Weps
- Elfriede Datzig as Christl von der Post
- Dorit Kreysler as Lisa
- Erika von Thellmann as Baronin Adelheid von Lütgendorf
- Rudolf Carl as Xaver
- Silvia de Bettini
- Fritzi Eckener as Zenzi
- Josef Eichheim as Fichtentaler
- Angelo Ferrari as guest at Count Zenkwitz
- Friedl Haerlin as Therese
- Gustl Kreusch as Fanny
- Amanda Lindner as Duchess
- Anton Maria Girardi as Graf Zenkwitz
- Julia Serda as Countess Brix

== See also ==
- The Bird Seller (1935)
- The Bird Seller (1953)
- Die Christel von der Post (1956)
- The Bird Seller (1962)
