= Jutta Bornemann =

Austrian actress and writer

- Born: 26 October 1920; Vienna, Austria
- Died: 20 January 1999 (aged 78); Bad Aussee, Styria, Austria
- Other name: Jutta Hilde Elisabeth Josefa Bornemann
- Occupations: Actress, writer
- Years active: 1951–65 (film)

Jutta Hilde Elisabeth Josefa Bornemann (26 October 1920 – 20 January 1999) was an Austrian actress and writer.

Bornemann was born in Vienna. She wrote and acted in Austrian films in the 1950s, including Der Obersteiger (The Mine Foreman) (1952), a reworking of the Carl Zeller operetta of the same name, written by Bornemann, Franz Antel, Gunther Philipp, and Friedrich Schreyvogel. She worked with Antel, Philipp, and Franz Beron, to wrote Ideale Frau Gesucht (Ideal Woman Sought) (1952), a musical film. She co-write Verliebte Leute (Loving Couples) (1954) with novelist Herbert Reinecker and Hanns Karl Kubiak.

== Selected filmography ==
=== Screenwriter ===
- The Mine Foreman (1952)
- Ideal Woman Sought (1952)
- The Emperor Waltz (1953)
- Dark Clouds Over the Dachstein (1953)
- Loving Couples (1954)
- Emperor's Ball (1956)

=== Actress ===
- Gateway to Peace (1951)
- Roses from the South (1954)
- The Song of Kaprun (1955)
- Four Girls from the Wachau (1957)
