= The Bird Seller (1962 film) =

1962 film

- The Kessler Sisters perform in a scene from the film
- German: Der Vogelhändler
- Directed by: Géza von Cziffra
- Written by: Géza von Cziffra; Ludwig Held (libretto); Moritz West (libretto)
- Produced by: Kurt Hartmann; Eberhard Meichsner
- Starring: Cornelia Froboess; Peter Weck; Albert Rueprecht
- Cinematography: Willy Winterstein
- Edited by: Werner Preuss
- Music by: Hagen Galatis; Carl Zeller (operetta)
- Production company: Divina Film
- Distributed by: Gloria Film
- Release date: 3 August 1962
- Running time: 87 minutes
- Country: West Germany
- Language: German

The Bird Seller (German: Der Vogelhändler) is a 1962 West German historical musical comedy film directed by Géza von Cziffra and starring Cornelia Froboess, Peter Weck and Albert Rueprecht.

It is an operetta film, based on the stage work of the same title by Carl Zeller. Several other film adaptations have also been made.

It was shot at the Spandau Studios in Berlin and at Linderhof Palace in Bavaria. The film's sets were designed by the art director Rolf Zehetbauer.

== Cast ==
- Cornelia Froboess as Christel
- Peter Weck as Count Stanislaus
- Albert Rueprecht as Vogelhändler Adam
- Maria Sebaldt as Kurfürstin Marie-Luise
- Ruth Stephan as Kammerzofe Melanie
- Anita Höfer as Jette Speck
- Rudolf Vogel as Count Weps
- Georg Thomalla as Kurfürst August
- Oskar Sima as Bürgermeister Speck
- Rudolf Platte as Baron von Weckerli
- Alice Kessler as Colin Sisters
- Ellen Kessler as Colin Sisters
- Franz-Otto Krüger as Commissar
- Bruno W. Pantel as Bruno
- Ewald Wenck as Josef

== See also ==
- The Bird Seller (1935 film)
- Roses in Tyrol (1940)
- The Bird Seller (1953 film)
- Die Christel von der Post (1956)
