= The Bird Seller (1935 film) =

1935 film

- German film poster
- German: Der Vogelhändler
- Directed by: E. W. Emo
- Written by: Max Wallner; Ludwig Held (libretto); Moritz West (libretto)
- Starring: Maria Andergast; Wolf Albach-Retty; Lil Dagover
- Cinematography: Ewald Daub
- Music by: Carl Zeller (operetta); Fritz Wenneis
- Production company: Majestic-Film
- Distributed by: Tobis Film; Sascha Film (Austria)
- Release date: 26 September 1935
- Running time: 76 minutes
- Country: Germany
- Language: German

The Bird Seller (German: Der Vogelhändler) is a 1935 German musical comedy film directed by E. W. Emo and starring Maria Andergast, Wolf Albach-Retty, and Lil Dagover. It is an operetta film, based on the work of the same name by Carl Zeller.

== Cast ==
- Maria Andergast as Christl von der Post
- Wolf Albach-Retty as Adam, the bird seller
- Lil Dagover as Electress
- Hans Zesch-Ballot as Prince-elector
- Genia Nikolaieva as Adelheid
- Georg Alexander as Count Stanislaus
- Max Gülstorff as Hofjägermeitster
- Gaston Briese
- Egon Brosig
- Gustl Gstettenbaur
- Arthur Hell
- Paul Mederow
- Paul Rehkopf
- Hans Schneider
- Franz Stein
- Jakob Tiedtke
- Wolfgang von Schwindt

== See also ==
- Roses in Tyrol (1940)
- The Bird Seller (1953)
- Die Christel von der Post (1956)
- The Bird Seller (1962)
