= Love, Girls and Soldiers =

- Directed by: Franz Antel
- Written by: Karl Farkas; Gustav Kampendonk; Bobby E. Lüthge
- Produced by: Franz Hoffmann
- Starring: Renate Holm; Willy Hagara; Carla Hagen
- Cinematography: Hans Heinz Theyer
- Edited by: Arnfried Heyne
- Music by: Klaus Ogermann
- Production company: Hope Film
- Distributed by: Gloria Film
- Release date: 14 November 1958
- Running time: 106 minutes
- Country: Austria
- Language: German

Love, Girls and Soldiers (German: Liebe, Mädchen und Soldaten) is a 1958 Austrian musical comedy film directed by Franz Antel and starring Renate Holm, Willy Hagara and Carla Hagen.

The film's sets were designed by the art director Sepp Rothaur. It was shot using Agfacolor. It was distributed by the prominent West German company Gloria Film.

== Cast ==
- Renate Holm as Steffi Gruber - Sängerin
- Willy Hagara as Edi Zaremba - Sänger u. Rekrut
- Carla Hagen as Anuschka
- Franz Muxeneder as Alois Krumstiel - Rekrut
- Walter Müller as Oberleutnant Bobby von Riedhoff
- Rolf Olsen as Max Feierabend - Feldwebel
- Loni Heuser as Gisela von Siebenstern, seine Frau
- Hubert von Meyerinck as Major von Siebenstern
- Helga Martin as Mimi Holzer - die Tochter
- Hans Olden as Major Holzer - Regimentskommandant
- Willy Millowitsch as Fritz, Feldwebel
- C.W. Fernbach as Ferdy Wimmer - Sekretär
- Ilse Peternell as Stubenmädchen
- Raoul Retzer as Kolomann, Rekturt
- Thomas Hörbiger as Hanusch, Rekrut
- Fritz Imhoff as Schöberl, Empfangschef

== Bibliography ==
- Robert von Dassanowsky. Austrian Cinema: A History. McFarland, 2005.
