= Oliver Hassencamp =

German writer and actor

- Born: 10 May 1921; Rastatt, Baden, Germany
- Died: 1 April 1988 (aged 66); Bavaria, West Germany
- Occupations: Actor, writer
- Years active: 1949–1968 (film)

Oliver Hassencamp (1921–1988) was a German writer and actor.

== Selected filmography ==
=== Film adaptations ===
- Bekenntnisse eines möblierten Herrn, directed by Franz Peter Wirth (1963, based on the novel Bekenntnisse eines möblierten Herrn)
- Burg Schreckenstein, directed by Ralf Huettner (2016, based on the Burg Schreckenstein novels)
- Burg Schreckenstein 2, directed by Ralf Huettner (2017, based on the Burg Schreckenstein novels)

=== Screenwriter ===
- The False Adam (dir. Géza von Cziffra, 1955)
- Mädchen mit schwachem Gedächtnis (dir. Géza von Cziffra, 1956)
- Münchner Lach- und Schießgesellschaft (dir. Sammy Drechsel, 1956–1959, TV series, 6 episodes)
- A Woman for Life (dir. Wolfgang Liebeneiner, 1960)
- You Don't Shoot at Angels (dir. Rolf Thiele, 1960) — (based on a play by Miguel Mihura)
- Girl from Hong Kong (dir. Franz Peter Wirth, 1961) — (based on a novel by Heinrich Hauser)
- Bekenntnisse eines möblierten Herrn (dir. Franz Peter Wirth, 1963)
- Hast du Töne, Papa? (dir. Wolfgang Becker, 1963, TV film)
- Ninotschka (dir. Imo Moszkowicz, 1965, TV film) — (remake of Ninotchka)
- Der Vogelhändler (dir. Joachim Hess, 1968, TV film) — (based on the operetta Der Vogelhändler)
- Schaukelstuhl: Pension Schicksal (dir. Theo Mezger, 1978, TV series, 6 episodes)

=== Actor ===
- Hello, Fraulein! (1949) - René
- They Call It Love (1953) - Torgler
- Jonny Saves Nebrador (1953)
- Fireworks (1954) - (uncredited)
- Conchita and the Engineer (1954)
- A Girl from Paris (1954)
- Heroism after Hours (1955) - Anton Hirsemenzel (segment "Romeo und Julia auf dem Tandem")
- Jackboot Mutiny (1955) - Oberst Möllendorf
- The Double Husband (1955) - Fernando Gonzales
- At Blonde Kathrein's Place (1959)
- Tales of a Young Scamp (1964) - Professor Bindinger
- Aunt Frieda (1965) - Professor Bindinger
- Zur Hölle mit den Paukern (1968, part 1) - Dr. Priehl (final film role)

== Bibliography ==
- Goble, Alan. The Complete Index to Literary Sources in Film. Walter de Gruyter, 1999.
