= Lemke's Widow =

Lemke's Widow may refer to:

- Lemke's Widow (1928 film), a German silent film
- Lemke's Widow (1957 film), a West German comedy film
