= The Sweetest Fruits =

1954 film

- German film poster
- German: Die süßesten Früchte
- Directed by: Franz Antel
- Written by: Karl Farkas; Karl Georg Külb
- Produced by: Jochen Genzow; [[Franz Seitz Jr.|Franz Seitz]]
- Starring: Maria Holst; Wolf Albach-Retty; Hannelore Bollmann
- Cinematography: Hans Heinz Theyer
- Edited by: Gertrud Hinz-Nischwitz
- Music by: Friedrich Meyer; Rudi Revil
- Production company: Ariston Film
- Distributed by: Neue Filmverleih
- Release date: 5 February 1954
- Running time: 93 minutes
- Country: West Germany
- Language: German

The Sweetest Fruits (German: Die süßesten Früchte) is a 1954 West German comedy film directed by Franz Antel and starring Maria Holst, Wolf Albach-Retty and Hannelore Bollmann.

It was shot at the Bavaria Studios in Munich and on location in Sicily. The film's sets were designed by the art director Arne Flekstad and Sepp Rothauer.

== Cast ==
- Maria Holst as Irina
- Wolf Albach-Retty as Roberto di Caramello / Bananen-Beppo
- Hannelore Bollmann as Eva
- Katharina Mayberg as Juanita
- Oskar Sima as Alvarez Petitez
- Joe Stöckel as Carfioli
- Rudolf Platte as Tomato
- Gunther Philipp as Domingo Petitez
- Ida Wüst as Frau Baroli
- Annelore Wied as Lieutenant Cocos
- Lia L'Arronge
- Hans Stiebner as Rigo
- Paul Heidemann as Warden
- Bum Krüger as Chief constable
- Raoul Retzer as Brezo
- Leila Negra as Singer
- Peter Alexander as Singer
- Die 3 Bajoratis as Dance group
- Eva Bajor as Singer
- Gretl Elb as Interjector at women's demonstration
- Erwin Lehn as himself - Dance band
- Carl Loubé as Orchestra
