= The Bird Seller (1953 film) =

1953 film directed by Arthur Maria Rabenalt

- German film poster
- German: Der Vogelhändler
- Directed by: Arthur Maria Rabenalt
- Written by: Curt J. Braun; Ludwig Held (libretto); Moritz West (libretto)
- Produced by: Kurt Ulrich; Heinz Willeg
- Starring: Ilse Werner; Wolf Albach-Retty; Eva Probst
- Cinematography: Willy Winterstein
- Edited by: Friedel Buckow
- Music by: Bert Grund; Carl Zeller (operetta)
- Production company: Berolina Film
- Distributed by: Allianz Filmverleih
- Release date: 17 September 1953
- Running time: 92 minutes
- Country: West Germany
- Language: German

The Bird Seller (German: Der Vogelhändler) is a 1953 West German musical film directed by Arthur Maria Rabenalt and starring Ilse Werner, Wolf Albach-Retty and Eva Probst. The film was made at the Bavaria Studios in Munich and shot in Agfacolor. The sets were designed by the art director Felix Smetana. An operetta film, it is one of several adaptations of the operetta The Bird Seller by Carl Zeller.

== Cast ==
- Ilse Werner as Fürstin Marie-Louise
- Wolf Albach-Retty as Fürst
- Eva Probst as Christel
- Gerhard Riedmann as Adam
- Sybil Werden as Jeanine
- Günther Lüders as Weps
- Erni Mangold as Ernestine
- Siegfried Breuer as Marquis de Tréville
- Hans Hermann Schaufuß as Johann
- Rudolf Reiff as Chief forester

== See also ==
- The Bird Seller (1935)
- Roses in Tyrol (1940)
- Die Christel von der Post (1956)
- The Bird Seller (1962)
