= Kauf dir einen bunten Luftballon =

1961 film

- Directed by: Géza von Cziffra
- Written by: Géza von Cziffra
- Produced by: Heinz Pollak (executive producer); Alfred Stöger (producer); Kurt Ulrich (producer)
- Starring: See below
- Cinematography: Willy Winterstein
- Edited by: Renate Jelinek
- Music by: Michael Jary
- Release date: 1961
- Running time: 102 minutes
- Countries: West Germany; Austria
- Language: German

Kauf dir einen bunten Luftballon is a 1961 West German / Austrian film directed by Géza von Cziffra.

== Cast ==
- Ina Bauer as Inge König
- Toni Sailer as Hans Haller
- Heinz Erhardt as Knapp, Theaterdirektor
- Ruth Stephan as Mia
- Walter Gross as Josef
- Gunther Philipp as Miffke
- Ernst Stankovski as Peter Bertram
- Paul Hörbiger as Professor Engelbert
- Ralf Wolter as Luggi
- Katharina Mayberg as Ilona Berg
- Fritz Muliar as Franzel
- C.W. Fernbach as Hühnchen
- Peter Parak as Robert
- Ernst Waldbrunn as Gerichtsvollzieher
- Oskar Sima as Hermann König
- Vienna Ice Revue
