= Königswalzer =

Königswalzer may refer to:

- Königswalzer (1935 film)
- Königswalzer (1955 film)
