= The Double Husband =

1955 film

- Directed by: Ferdinand Dörfler
- Written by: Rolf Dortenwald
- Produced by: Ferdinand Dörfler
- Starring: Joe Stöckel; Grethe Weiser; Ingrid Pan
- Cinematography: Erich Claunigk
- Edited by: Jutta Hering
- Music by: Peter Igelhoff
- Production company: Dörfler-Filmproduktion
- Distributed by: Deutsche Film Hansa
- Release date: 14 July 1955
- Running time: 95 minutes
- Country: West Germany
- Language: German

The Double Husband (German: Der doppelte Ehemann) is a 1955 West German comedy film directed by Ferdinand Dörfler, starring Joe Stöckel, Grethe Weiser and Ingrid Pan. It was shot at the Bavaria Studios in Munich.

== Synopsis ==
Grethe Koblanck and her husband own a successful fur fashion house in Munich. She suspects him of flirting with younger women, including the South American Dolores. She employs a hidden camera to keep an eye on him. Upon discovering this, he gets a doppelganger to take his place. Things go wrong when it turns out his double also has an interest in attractive women.

== Cast ==
- Joe Stöckel as Otto Koblanck / August Schmitt
- Grethe Weiser as Grethe Koblanck
- Ingrid Pan as Inge Koblanck
- Peer Schmidt as Heinz Krämer
- Georg Lehn as Fritz Schneider
- Ingeborg Cornelius as Dolores Gonzales
- Oliver Hassencamp as Fernando Gonzales
- Ingrid Lutz as Barsängerin Kitty
- Erika von Thellmann as Klothilde Kümmerling, Directrice
- Ellen Hille as Klara Berger
- Alfred Schrempf as Paul - ihr Zwilling
- Christine Koschkar as Linchen - ihr Zwilling
- Carla Hagen as Anna, Mädchen
- Joseph Offenbach as Gerichtsvollzieher
- Wastl Witt as Taxichauffeur
- Elise Aulinger as Fürsorgebeamtin
- Eduard Linkers as Bachwitz
- Werner Lieven as Hotelportier
- Leo Siedler as Hotelmanager

== Bibliography ==
- Bock, Hans-Michael & Bergfelder, Tim. The Concise CineGraph. Encyclopedia of German Cinema. Berghahn Books, 2009.
