= The Inn on the Lahn =

1955 film

- Directed by: Johann Alexander Hübler-Kahla
- Written by: Ernst Neubach
- Produced by: Ernst Neubach
- Starring: Dorit Kreysler; Oskar Sima; Ingrid Pan
- Cinematography: Károly Kurzmayer
- Edited by: Lieselotte Prattes
- Music by: Will Meisel
- Production company: Neubach Film
- Distributed by: Atlantic Film
- Release date: 20 September 1955
- Running time: 97 minutes
- Country: West Germany
- Language: German

The Inn on the Lahn or The Hostess of the Lahn (German: Die Wirtin an der Lahn) is a 1955 West German comedy film directed by Johann Alexander Hübler-Kahla and starring Dorit Kreysler, Oskar Sima and Ingrid Pan. The film's sets were designed by the art directors Ernst H. Albrecht and Paul Markwitz .

== Synopsis ==
Karoline Steinmeier and her husband Josef are a tight-fisted couple who run an inn on the River Lahn near the Rhineland. For years they have been collecting the pension of her grandfather who had long since died, from his employer, a winemaker. When he wants to visit to celebrate the old man's hundred birthday, the couple urgently have to find a replacement grandfather in order to prevent the fraud being discovered.

== Cast ==
- Dorit Kreysler as Karoline Steinmeier
- Oskar Sima as Josef Steinmeier, ihr Gatte
- Hanita Hallan as Gretl, beider Nichte
- Josef Egger as Großvater Zimperl
- Ingrid Pan as Marie Zimperl, seine Enkelin
- Werner Fuetterer as Herr Sonnenschein, Handlungsreisender
- Joachim Brennecke as Direktor Hans Eschelbach
- Katharina Mayberg as Josefine, Kellnerin
- Irina Garden as Claire
- Ludwig Schmidseder as Gendarm

== Bibliography ==
- Goble, Alan. The Complete Index to Literary Sources in Film. Walter de Gruyter, 1999.
- Klossner, Michael. The Europe of 1500-1815 on Film and Television: A Worldwide Filmography of Over 2550 Works, 1895 Through 2000. McFarland & Company, 2002.
