= Ingrid Pan =

German actress (1930–1995)

- Born: 9 August 1930; Berlin, Germany
- Died: 30 November 1995 (aged 65); Munich, Germany
- Occupation: Actress
- Years active: 1952–1966 (film and television)

Ingrid Pan (9 August 1930 – 30 November 1995) was a German stage and film actress who was active in West German cinema during the 1950s in prominent supporting roles. She later worked frequently in radio.

Pan was married to the German actor and playwright Heinz-Günter Stamm. She died in 1995.

== Selected filmography ==
- The White Horse Inn (1952)
- Lady's Choice (1953)
- Marriage for One Night (1953)
- Hooray, It's a Boy! (1953)
- A Musical War of Love (1953)
- Ave Maria (1953)
- The Sun of St. Moritz (1954)
- The Double Husband (1955)
- The Inn on the Lahn (1955)
- If We All Were Angels (1956)
- Wir Wunderkinder (1958)
- Hula-Hopp, Conny (1959)

== Bibliography ==
- Elena Agazzi & Erhard Schütz. Handbuch Nachkriegskultur: Literatur, Sachbuch und Film in Deutschland (1945–1962). Walter de Gruyter, 2013.
