= Panoptikum 59 =

1959 film

- Directed by: Walter Kolm-Veltée
- Written by: Walter Kolm-Veltée
- Starring: Michael Heltau
- Cinematography: Hanns König
- Music by: Alfred Uhl
- Release date: June 1959
- Running time: 94 minutes
- Country: Austria
- Language: German

Panoptikum 59 is a 1959 Austrian drama film directed by Walter Kolm-Veltée. It was entered into the 9th Berlin International Film Festival.

== Cast ==
- Michael Heltau – Werner
- Alexander Trojan – Klinger
- Elisabeth Berzobohaty – Kora
- Heiki Eis – Ein junger Mensch
- Paula Elges – Thea Gutwell
- Melanie Horeschowsky – Alte Dame
- Erna Korhel – Mutter Felizitas
- Helmut Kraus – Dr. Schmuck
- Ulla Purr – Felizita
- Herbert Schmid – Schalk
- Alma Seidler
