= The First Day of Spring =

1956 film

- Directed by: Helmut Weiss
- Written by: Jacob Geis; Juliane Kay; Alf Teichs; Helmut Weiss
- Based on: Call It a Day by Dodie Smith
- Produced by: Artur Brauner; Horst Wendlandt
- Starring: Luise Ullrich; Paul Dahlke; Ingeborg Schöner
- Cinematography: Karl Löb
- Edited by: Annemarie Rokoss
- Music by: Georg Haentzschel
- Production company: CCC Film
- Distributed by: Deutsche London-Film
- Release date: 5 June 1956
- Running time: 92 minutes
- Country: West Germany
- Language: German

The First Day of Spring (German: Der erste Frühlingstag) is a 1956 West German comedy film directed by Helmut Weiss and starring Luise Ullrich, Paul Dahlke and Ingeborg Schöner. It was based on the 1935 play Call It a Day by the British writer Dodie Smith. It was made at the Spandau Studios in Berlin. The film's sets were designed by the art directors Mathias Matthies and Ellen Schmidt. It premiered at the Marmorhaus in West Berlin.

== Synopsis ==
As the first day of spring arrives, the Hiller household is briefly in confusion. After twenty years of marriage mother Dolly meets an adventurer who wants her to go to Africa with him, while her husband Robert is flirting with attractive singer Bettina Morelli. Their three children, too, are getting their first taste of romance. By midnight, however, all has returned to normal.

== Cast ==
- Luise Ullrich as Dolly
- Paul Dahlke as Robert Hiller
- Ingeborg Schöner as Vera
- Matthias Fuchs as Martin
- Angelika Meissner as Lilo
- Fita Benkhoff as Käthe
- Robert Freitag as Bruno
- Gustav Fröhlich as Paul Frank
- Heli Finkenzeller as Edith
- Brigitte Grothum as Trixi
- Blandine Ebinger as Elsi
- Carla Hagen as Fanny
- Lori Leux as Oma
- Katharina Mayberg as Bettina Morelli
- Kurt Roy as Albert
- Lou Seitz as Martha
- Horst Willer as Fred

== See also ==
- Call It a Day (1937)

== Bibliography ==
- Parish, James Robert. Film Actors Guide. Scarecrow Press, 1977.
