= Gulliver's Travels (1924 film) =

1924 film

- German: Gullivers Reisen
- Directed by: Géza von Cziffra
- Written by: Géza von Cziffra
- Based on: Gulliver's Travels; 1726 novel by Jonathan Swift
- Starring: Eugen Neufeld; Liesl Stillmark; Gyula Szöreghy
- Cinematography: Viktor Gluck
- Production company: Renaissance-Film
- Release date: 1924
- Country: Austria
- Languages: Silent; German intertitles

Gulliver's Travels (German: Gullivers Reisen) is a 1924 Austrian silent adventure film directed by Géza von Cziffra and starring Eugen Neufeld, Liesl Stillmark and Gyula Szöreghy. It is based on the 1726 novel Gulliver's Travels by the Anglo-Irish writer Jonathan Swift.

The film's sets were designed by the art director József Pán.

== Cast ==
- Eugen Neufeld as Lemuel Gulliver
- Liesl Stillmark
- Gyula Szöreghy
- Hans Heinz Theyer
- Ferike Vidor
