= Maria von der Osten-Sacken =

German screenwriter and film producer

- Born: 17 November 1901; Dessau, German Empire
- Died: 17 December 1985 (aged 84); Munich, Bavaria, West Germany
- Occupations: Writer, Producer
- Years active: 1943-1962 (film)

Maria von der Osten-Sacken (1901–1985) was a German screenwriter and film producer.

== Selected filmography ==
- A Man with Principles? (1943)
- The Time with You (1948)
- The Disturbed Wedding Night (1950)
- White Shadows (1951)
- Toxi (1952)
- Anna Louise and Anton (1953)
- Stars Over Colombo (1953)
- The Prisoner of the Maharaja (1954)
- Maxie (1954)
- The Silent Angel (1954)
- Rose-Girl Resli (1954)
- Reaching for the Stars (1955)
- The Dark Star (1955)
- Mandolins and Moonlight (1959)
- You Must Be Blonde on Capri (1961)

== Bibliography ==
- Fenner, Angelica. Race Under Reconstruction in German Cinema: Robert Stemmle's Toxi. University of Toronto Press, 2011.
