= Call It a Day =

1937 film by Dodie Smith, Archie Mayo

- Theatrical release poster
- Directed by: Archie Mayo
- Screenplay by: Casey Robinson; Sheridan Gibney
- Based on: Call It a Day by Dodie Smith
- Produced by: Henry Blanke; Hal B. Wallis
- Starring: Olivia de Havilland; Ian Hunter; Anita Louise; Alice Brady; Roland Young; Frieda Inescort
- Cinematography: Ernest Haller
- Edited by: James Gibbon
- Music by: Heinz Roemheld
- Production company: Cosmopolitan Productions
- Distributed by: Warner Bros. Pictures
- Release date: April 17, 1937
- Running time: 90 minutes
- Country: United States
- Language: English

Call It a Day is a 1937 American comedy film directed by Archie Mayo and starring Olivia de Havilland, Ian Hunter, Anita Louise, Alice Brady, Roland Young, and Frieda Inescort. Based on the 1935 play Call It a Day by Dodie Smith, the film is about a day in the life of a middle-class London family whose lives are complicated by the first romantic signs of spring.

== Plot ==
As the first day of spring arrives with unseasonably warm weather, the Hilton household is briefly turned upside down. Eldest daughter Cath has fallen hopelessly in love with the married artist painting her portrait, father Roger has his head turned by glamorous film star Beatrice Gwynn when he assists her with her taxes, wife Dorothy has an offer to elope to India with her friend's brother shortly after meeting him and son Martin wants to go motoring around the Continent until he encounters the attractive girl next door. Even youngest daughter Ann has developed an obsession with the Victorian artist Dante Gabriel Rossetti. By the end of the day all is righted and a semblance of normality has returned.

== Cast ==
- Olivia de Havilland as Catherine 'Cath' Hilton
- Ian Hunter as Roger Hilton
- Anita Louise as Joan Collett
- Alice Brady as Muriel West
- Roland Young as Frank Haines
- Frieda Inescort as Dorothy Hilton
- Bonita Granville as Ann Hilton
- Peggy Wood as Ethel Francis
- Marcia Ralston as Beatrice Gwynn
- Walter Woolf King as Paul Francis
- Peter Willes as Martin Hilton
- Una O'Connor as Mrs. Milson, the Housekeeper
- Beryl Mercer as Mrs. Elkins, the Cook
- Elsa Buchanan as Vera, the Maid
- Mary Field as Elsie Lester, Roger's Secretary
- May Beatty as Frank's Landlady
- Sidney Bracey as Flower Shop Owner
- Leyland Hodgson as Sir Harold
- Robert Adair as Butler
- Louise Stanley as Girl on Bus
- Clarissa Selwynne as Annoyed Woman in Theater

== Production ==
=== Soundtrack ===
- "I'm Forever Blowing Bubbles" (James Kendis, James Brockman, Nat Vincent, John W. Kellette) performed by Ian Hunter
- "Isn't It Romantic?" (Richard Rodgers, Lorenz Hart) performed by Marcia Ralston

== Reception ==
In his May 7, 1937, review, The New York Times' Frank Nugent said that he "enjoyed" the "tolerant and quietly humorous piece", and praised the ensemble cast. Two months later, writing for Night and Day, Graham Greene gave the film a poor review and complained about the self-sanitized story of temptations rejected in the face of infidelity. Greene also complains of the use of clichéd dialogue, which includes the stale line, "Do you mind if I slip into something more comfortable?" which, Greene adds, "to our astonishment [leads to] the temptress reappear[ing] in just another evening dress."

== See also ==
- The First Day of Spring (1956)
