= Where the Ancient Forests Rustle =

1956 film

- Directed by: Alfons Stummer
- Written by: Alfons Stummer; Werner P. Zibaso
- Produced by: Eberhard Meichsner; Walter Traut
- Starring: Willy Fritsch; Josefin Kipper; Carl Möhner
- Cinematography: Herbert Thallmayer
- Edited by: Walter Boos
- Music by: Marc Roland; Rolf A. Wilhelm
- Production company: Divina-Film
- Distributed by: Gloria Film
- Release date: 14 September 1956
- Running time: 89 minutes
- Country: West Germany
- Language: German

Where the Ancient Forests Rustle (German: Wo die alten Wälder rauschen) is a 1956 West German drama film directed by Alfons Stummer and starring Willy Fritsch, Josefin Kipper and Carl Möhner. It was one of a large number of heimatfilm pictures made during the decade.

The film's sets were designed by the art director Gabriel Pellon.

== Synopsis ==
The widowed owner of a Hamburg construction company takes his young son on holiday to the Austrian Alps, but his obsession with work drives a wedge between them.

== Cast ==
- Willy Fritsch as Harald Rehm
- Josefin Kipper as Margret Bruhn
- Carl Möhner as Klaus Baumgartner
- Armin Dahlen as Toni Burgstaller
- Peter Finkbeiner as Nils, Rehms Sohn
- Peter Fischer as Loisl
- Gundula Korte
- Maria Hofen
- Lotte Rausch
- Gerty Godden as Barbara Henkel
- Elfie Pertramer as Vroni, Hausmädchen
- Herta Staal
- Michl Lang
- Franz Fröhlich
- Til Kiwe as Eibl, Ingenieur
- Sepp Rist

== Bibliography ==
- Harald Höbusch. "Mountain of Destiny": Nanga Parbat and Its Path Into the German Imagination. Boydell & Brewer, 2016.
