= Son Without a Home =

1955 film

- Directed by: Hans Deppe
- Written by: Hilde Keller; Paul Keller (novel Der Sohn der Hagar); Tibor Yost
- Produced by: Hans Deppe; Wilhelm Gernhardt
- Starring: Werner Krauss; Elisabeth Flickenschildt; Josefin Kipper
- Cinematography: Werner M. Lenz
- Edited by: Johanna Meisel
- Music by: Alois Melichar
- Production company: Hans Deppe Film
- Distributed by: Constantin Film
- Release date: 27 October 1955
- Running time: 98 minutes
- Country: West Germany
- Language: German

Son Without a Home (German: Sohn ohne Heimat) is a 1955 West German drama film directed by Hans Deppe and starring Werner Krauss, Elisabeth Flickenschildt, Josefin Kipper. It was shot at the Spandau Studios in Berlin and on location in Bad Kissingen, Bavaria. The film's sets were designed by the art director Willi Herrmann.

== Cast ==
- Werner Krauss as Wilhelm Hartmann
- Elisabeth Flickenschildt as Anna Hartmann
- Josefin Kipper as Christel Hartmann
- Eva Probst as Lore Hartmann
- Paul Bösiger as Robert Hellmich
- Paul Esser as Ludwig Steiner
- Wolfgang Gruner as Ferdinand Pohl
- Herbert Weissbach as Hermann Schulze
- Heinrich Gretler as Gottlieb Peukert
- Gunnar Möller as Berthold Müller
- Paul Klinger as Dr. Friedlieb
- Paul Bildt as Vater Hellmich
- Elise Aulinger as Mutter Hellmich
- Kurt Vespermann as Maurer Menzel
- Ewald Wenck as Friseur Fasel
- Trude Wilke-Roßwog as Fräulein Jettel

== See also ==
- Out of the Mist (1927)

== Bibliography ==
- Hans-Michael Bock and Tim Bergfelder. The Concise Cinegraph: An Encyclopedia of German Cinema. Berghahn Books, 2009.
