= The Emperor Waltz (1953 film) =

1953 film by Franz Antel

- Directed by: Franz Antel
- Written by: Friedrich Schreyvogel; Jutta Bornemann; Gunther Philipp; Franz Antel
- Produced by: Erich von Neusser
- Starring: Maria Holst; Rudolf Prack; Winnie Markus
- Cinematography: Hans Heinz Theyer
- Edited by: Arnfried Heyne
- Music by: Hans Lang
- Production company: Neusser-Film
- Distributed by: Gloria Film
- Release date: 10 September 1953
- Running time: 95 minutes
- Country: Austria
- Language: German

The Emperor Waltz (German: Kaiserwalzer) is a 1953 Austrian historical drama film directed by Franz Antel and starring Maria Holst, Rudolf Prack and Winnie Markus. The film's sets were designed by Heinz Ockermüller and Sepp Rothaur. It is set during the era of Empress Elisabeth of Austria.

== Cast ==
- Maria Holst as Kaiserin Elisabeth von Österreich
- Rudolf Prack as Erzherzog Ludwig
- Winnie Markus as Luise Pichler - Lehrerin
- Gunther Philipp as Sein Adjutant Ltn. Zauner
- Hans Holt as Resinger - Lehrer in Ischl
- Oskar Sima as Bachmaier - Konditor
- Ilse Peternell as Mizzi - Seine Tochter
- Paul Westermeier as Hauptmann Krause
- Angelika Hauff as Tänzerin Anni Wührer
- Erik Frey as Graf Ferry
- Pepi Glöckner-Kramer as Anna Riegler
- Harry Hardt as Fürst Montenuovo
- Willy Danek as Kaiser Franz Joseph von Österreich
- Erich Dörner as Veterinär Krallitschek
- Ellen Lauff as Gräfin Mansfweld

== Bibliography ==
- Bock, Hans-Michael & Bergfelder, Tim. The Concise CineGraph. Encyclopedia of German Cinema. Berghahn Books, 2009.
