= The False Adam =

1955 film

- German film poster
- German: Der falsche Adam
- Directed by: Géza von Cziffra
- Written by: Géza von Cziffra; Oliver Hassencamp
- Produced by: Otto Meissner
- Starring: Waltraut Haas; Rudolf Platte; Doris Kirchner
- Cinematography: Albert Benitz
- Edited by: Alice Ludwig
- Music by: Charles Nowa
- Production company: Arion-Film
- Distributed by: Deutsche London-Film
- Release date: 16 June 1955
- Running time: 80 minutes
- Country: West Germany
- Language: German

The False Adam (German: Der falsche Adam) is a 1955 West German comedy film directed by Géza von Cziffra and starring Waltraut Haas, Rudolf Platte and Doris Kirchner.

The film's sets were designed by the art director Albrecht Becker and Herbert Kirchhoff. It was shot at the Wandsbek Studios in Hamburg.

== Cast ==
- Waltraut Haas as Renate Meinecke
- Rudolf Platte as Adam Waldemar Meinecke, ihr Mann
- Doris Kirchner as Mabel, Meyer's daughter
- Walter Müller as Robert Bullinger
- Loni Heuser as Luise, Meyer's wife
- Oskar Sima as Mr. Meyer
- Günther Lüders as Jan Piepenbrink
- Erni Mangold as Dolly Dobbs
- Peter Garden
- Karin von Dassel
- Hans Schwarz Jr.
- Joseph Offenbach
- Holger Hagen
- Marga Maasberg
- Tim Oldehoff
- Horst von Otto
- Joachim Wolf
- Josef Albrecht as waiter
- Heinz Frese as husband
- Sonja Wilken as young lady
