= Herbert Jarczyk =

German composer

- Born: 10 February 1913; Laurahütte, Upper Silesia, German Empire
- Died: 21 October 1968 (aged 55); Munich, Bavaria, West Germany
- Occupation: Composer
- Years active: 1949–1968 (film)

Herbert Jarczyk (1913–1968) was a German composer. He produced film scores for West German cinema and television in the post-war era. He wrote the theme tune for the television series Der Kommissar. His brother Michael Jary was also a noted composer for films.

== Selected filmography ==
- Good Fortune in Ohio (1950)
- Desire (1951)
- It Began at Midnight (1951)
- Dark Clouds Over the Dachstein (1953)
- Open Your Window (1953)
- Wedding Bells (1954)
- André and Ursula (1955)
- San Salvatore (1956)
- An American in Salzburg (1958)
- The Merry War of Captain Pedro (1959)
- Two Times Adam, One Time Eve (1959)
- Murderer in the Fog (1964)

== Bibliography ==
- Fritsche, Maria. Homemade Men In Postwar Austrian Cinema: Nationhood, Genre and Masculinity . Berghahn Books, 2013.
