= Willem Holsboer =

German actor (1905–1959)

- Born: 3 August 1905; Stuttgart, Württemberg, German Empire
- Died: 16 June 1959 (aged 53); Munich, Bavaria, West Germany
- Occupation: Actor
- Years active: 1931–1959 (film)

Willem Holsboer (3 August 1905 – 16 June 1959) was a German stage and film actor.

== Selected filmography ==
- Comradeship (1931)
- Peer Gynt (1934)
- Street Music (1936)
- People Who Travel (1938)
- Three Wonderful Days (1939)
- What Does Brigitte Want? (1941)
- The Little Residence (1942)
- To Be God One Time (1942)
- Don't Talk to Me About Love (1943)
- Insolent and in Love (1948)
- Trouble in Paradise (1950)
- Heart's Desire (1951)
- The White Adventure (1952)
- The Forester's Daughter (1952)
- The Missing Miniature (1954)
- The Royal Waltz (1955)
- Roses in Autumn (1955)
- I'll See You at Lake Constance (1956)
- The Beggar Student (1956)
- Restless Night (1958)
- Paprika (1959)
