= Walter Kolm-Veltée =

Austrian film director

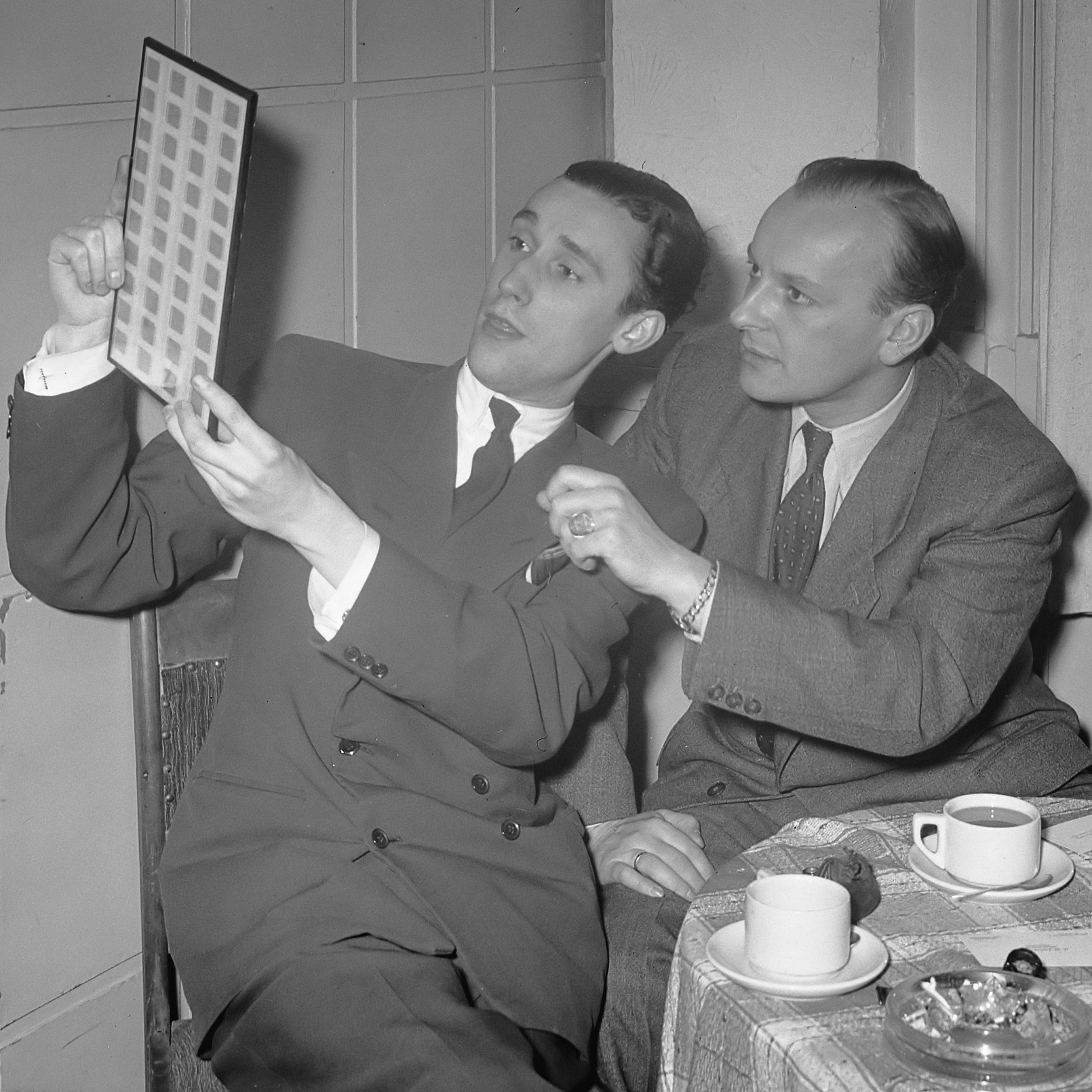
- Paul Huf and Walter Kolm-Veltée (r.) (1951)
- Born: 27 December 1910; Vienna, Austria
- Died: 8 March 1999 (aged 88); Vienna, Austria
- Occupation: Film director
- Years active: 1926-1982

Walter Kolm-Veltée (27 December 1910 – 8 March 1999) was an Austrian film director. He directed nine films between 1933 and 1959. He was the son of Austrian film directors Luise Fleck and Anton Kolm.

He became a respected film director, producer and screenwriter. After his earlier career in which he often worked with his mother and stepfather, he founded in 1952 the first film academy in Austria, at the Hochschule für Musik und darstellende Kunst in Vienna. His film on the life of Beethoven, Eroica, released in 1949, with Ewald Balser, Oskar Werner and Judith Holzmeister in the leads, is counted as one of the most successful Austrian films ever. In the same way that his parents were pioneers of film, so Walter Kolm-Veltée was a pioneer of the development of the new medium of television.

His 1959 film Panoptikum 59 was entered into the 9th Berlin International Film Festival.

== Filmography ==
- Unser Kaiser (1933)
- The Poacher from Egerland (1934)
- Csardas (1935)
- Eroica (1949)
- Franz Schubert (1953)
- Don Juan (1955)
- Wiener Luft (1958)
- Auch Männer sind keine Engel (1959)
- Panoptikum 59 (1959)
