= Congress of Love =

1966 film

- Directed by: Géza von Radványi
- Written by: Fred Denger; Hans Habe; Aldo von Pinelli; Géza von Radványi
- Produced by: Robert de Nesle; Adolf Eder; Heinz Pollak; Georg M. Reuther; Karl Spiehs; Aldo von Pinelli
- Starring: Lilli Palmer; Curd Jürgens; Hannes Messemer
- Cinematography: Heinz Hölscher
- Edited by: Karl Fugunt; Henri W. Sokal
- Music by: Peter Thomas
- Production companies: Comptoir Français de Productions Cinématographiques; Melodie Film; Wiener Stadthalle
- Distributed by: Nora Film
- Release date: 17 March 1966
- Running time: 96 minutes
- Countries: Austria; France; West Germany
- Language: German

Congress of Love or The Congress Amuses Itself (French: Le Congrès s'amuse, German: Der Kongreß amüsiert sich) is a 1966 historical comedy film directed by Géza von Radványi and starring Lilli Palmer, Curd Jürgens and Hannes Messemer. It was produced as an international co-production between Austria, France and West Germany. It was shot at the Sievering Studios in Vienna and on location across the city at Hofburg Palace, Schönbrunn Palace, and the Prater. The film's sets were designed by the art directors Hertha Hareiter and Otto Pischinger. It takes place at the Congress of Vienna in 1814, the same setting for the classic Weimar era 1931 film Congress Dances. It features many of the leading delegates to the Congress, with the exception of the British representative Lord Castlereagh.

== Synopsis ==
Beginning with a framing scene in a museum, the story leaps back a century and a half to the end of the Napoleonic Wars. Following the defeat of Napoleon in 1814, the victorious allies and other powers father in Vienna for a major congress to establish the new borders of Europe in the aftermath of the Napoleonic Wars. The cynical Austrian foreign minister Klemens von Metternich plans to manipulate the other delegates to his will, but faces complexities in his own private life.

== Cast ==
- Lilli Palmer as Princess Metternich
- Curd Jürgens as Czar Alexander I
- Hannes Messemer as Prince Metternich
- Paul Meurisse as Talleyrand
- Françoise Arnoul as Countess Kopinskaia
- Walter Slezak as Wax museum guide
- Anita Höfer as Rosa
- Brett Halsey as Stefan Abonyi
- Gustav Knuth as Mr. Abonyi, Stefan's father
- Wolfgang Kieling as Napoleon's double
- Bibi Jelinek as Sophie
- Kurt Meisel as Semmelbein, the jeweler
- Helga Anders as Anni
- Franz Muxeneder as Grasl
- Hannelore Bollmann as Duchess de Sagan
- Lukas Ammann as Friedrich von Gentz
- Ulla Moritz as Duchess de Talleyrand
- Melanie Horeschowsky as Stefan's grandmother
- Ingeborg Gruber as Steffi
- Ilse Kaller as Young gypsy
- Hannes Schiel as Emperor Francis I
- Else Rambausek as Zofe
- Philippe March as Monsieur Beauregard
- Herbert Fux as Von Gentz's Secretary
- Sieglinde Koch as Marie-Louise
- Raoul Retzer as King of Prussia
- Walter Regelsberger as Count Neippberg

== See also ==
- The Congress Dances, a 1955 film

== Bibliography ==
- Klossner, Michael . The Europe of 1500-1815 on Film and Television: A Worldwide Filmography of Over 2550 Works, 1895 Through 2000. McFarland & Company, 2002.
- Von Dassanowsky, Robert. Austrian Cinema: A History. McFarland, 2005.
