= The Congress Dances (1955 film) =

1955 film by Franz Antel

- Directed by: Franz Antel
- Written by: Kurt Nachmann
- Produced by: Erich von Neusser
- Starring: Johanna Matz; Rudolf Prack; Hannelore Bollmann
- Cinematography: Georg Bruckbauer
- Edited by: Arnfried Heyne; Rudolf Zehetgruber
- Music by: Werner R. Heymann
- Production companies: Cosmos Film; Neusser-Film
- Distributed by: Gloria Film
- Release date: 19 December 1955
- Running time: 105 minutes
- Country: Austria
- Language: German

The Congress Dances (German: Der Kongreß tanzt) is a 1955 Austrian historical musical film directed by Franz Antel and starring Johanna Matz, Rudolf Prack and Hannelore Bollmann. It is a remake of the 1930 film The Congress Dances.

It was made with the backing of Gloria Film, a leading West German distributor. The film was shot in Eastmancolor, with sets designed by art directors Isabella and Werner Schlichting. It was shot at three studios in Vienna, the Rosenhugel, Sievering and Schönbrunn Studios. Location shooting took place around the city, and in the Wachau. It was the first Austrian film to be made in Cinemascope.

== Plot ==
The plot revolves around a romance that takes place during the Congress of Vienna in 1814.

== Cast ==
- Johanna Matz as Christl Weinzinger
- Rudolf Prack as Tsar Alexander I / Uralsky
- Hannelore Bollmann as Babette
- Marte Harell as Countess Ballansky
- Jester Naefe as Lydia
- Hans Moser as Schöberl
- Josef Meinrad as Franzl Eder
- Gunther Philipp as Pepi Gallinger
- Karl Schönböck as Count Metternich
- Oskar Sima as Bibikoff
- Paul Westermeier as Franz
- Ernst Waldbrunn as Schabzigl
- Ilse Peternell as Lisel
- Rosa Albach-Retty
- Fritz Muliar
- C.W. Fernbach
- Karl Fochler
- Raoul Retzer
- Peter Czejke
- Kathrin Oginski

== Bibliography ==
- Bock, Hans-Michael; Bergfelder, Tim, eds. (2009). The Concise Cinegraph: Encyclopaedia of German Cinema. New York: Berghahn Books. ISBN 978-1-57181-655-9.

== See also ==
- Congress of Love, a 1966 film
