= The Chaste Libertine =

1952 film directed by Carl Boese

- Georg Thomalla and Dorit Kreysler
- Directed by: Carl Boese
- Written by: Franz Arnold (play); Ernst Bach (play); Curth Flatow; Bobby E. Lüthge; Peter Paulsen
- Produced by: Artur Brauner
- Starring: Georg Thomalla; Joe Stöckel; Grethe Weiser
- Cinematography: Ted Kornowicz; Herbert Körner
- Edited by: Johanna Meisel
- Music by: Michael Jary
- Production company: CCC Film
- Distributed by: Prisma Film
- Release date: 17 July 1952
- Running time: 94 minutes
- Country: West Germany
- Language: German

The Chaste Libertine (German: Der keusche Lebemann) is a 1952 West German comedy film directed by Carl Boese and starring Georg Thomalla, Joe Stöckel and Grethe Weiser. It was based on a popular stage farce of the same title by Franz Arnold and Ernst Bach which had previously been turned into the 1931 film The Night Without Pause.

It was made at the Spandau Studios of Artur Brauner's CCC Films. The film's sets were designed by Emil Hasler and Walter Kutz.

== Synopsis ==
When his wife suspects Julius Seibold, her circus-owning husband, of having an affair, he tries to allay her suspicions by suggesting that it is really his young assistant Max who is having a relationship with the woman, and that he is in fact a playboy. Max's fictitious lifestyle in turn attracts the Siebold's daughter to Max.

== Cast ==
- Georg Thomalla as Max Stieglitz
- Joe Stöckel as Julius Seibold
- Grethe Weiser as Regine Seibold
- Marianne Koch as Gerty Seibold
- Karl Schönböck as Dr. Fellner
- Dorit Kreysler as Rita Reiner
- Ethel Reschke as Dolly
- Rolf Weih as Riemann
- Ursula Herking as Anna
- Bully Buhlan as Singer
- Wolfgang Jansen

== Bibliography ==
- Hans-Michael Bock and Tim Bergfelder. The Concise Cinegraph: An Encyclopedia of German Cinema. Berghahn Books, 2009.
