= Emperor's Ball =

- Directed by: Franz Antel
- Written by: Jutta Bornemann; Karl Leiter
- Produced by: Franz Hoffmann
- Starring: Sonja Ziemann; Rudolf Prack; Hannelore Bollmann
- Cinematography: Hans Heinz Theyer
- Edited by: Arnfried Heyne
- Music by: Johannes Fehring; Hans Lang; Heinz Musil; Lotar Olias
- Production company: Neusser-Film
- Distributed by: Gloria Film
- Release date: 10 September 1956
- Running time: 95 minutes
- Country: Austria
- Language: German

Emperor's Ball (German: Kaiserball) is a 1956 Austrian drama film directed by Franz Antel and starring Sonja Ziemann, Rudolf Prack and Hannelore Bollmann. The film is part of a cycle of films set during the old Austro-Hungarian Empire. It was shot in Agfacolor with sets designed by Otto Pischinger.

== Cast ==
- Sonja Ziemann as Franzi
- Rudolf Prack as Reichsgraf Georg von Hohenegg
- Hannelore Bollmann as Prinzessin Christine
- Maria Andergast as Fürstin zu Schenckenberg
- Jane Tilden as Gräfin Reichenbach
- Ilse Peternell as Direktrice
- Bully Buhlan as Graf Baranyi
- Hans Olden as Erzherzog Benedikt
- Rolf Olsen as Jean Müller
- Paul Löwinger as Portier Bichler
- Thomas Hörbiger as Willi
- C.W. Fernbach as Offizier
- Raoul Retzer as Kriminalkommissär
- Hans Moser as Portier Rienössl

== Bibliography ==
- Jennifer M. Kapczynski & Michael D. Richardson. A New History of German Cinema. Boydell & Brewer, 2014.
