= Ideal Woman Sought =

1952 Austrian musical film by Franz Antel

- Directed by: Franz Antel
- Written by: Franz Beron (play); Jutta Bornemann; Gunther Philipp; Franz Antel
- Produced by: Karl Hofer; Felix R. Fohn
- Starring: Inge Egger; Jeanette Schultze; Waltraut Haas
- Cinematography: Hans Heinz Theyer
- Music by: Willy Berking; Johannes Fehring; Gerhard Froboess; Werner Müller
- Production companies: Cziffra-Film; Schönbrunn-Film
- Distributed by: Constantin Film
- Release date: 30 September 1952
- Running time: 96 minutes
- Country: Austria
- Language: German

Ideal Woman Sought (German: Ideale Frau gesucht) is a 1952 Austrian comedy film directed by Franz Antel and starring Inge Egger, Jeanette Schultze and Waltraut Haas. It was made at the Schönbrunn Studios in Vienna. The film's sets were designed by the art director Felix Smetana.

A famous womanizer and writer, Robby Holm, is chosen to pick out the "Ideal Woman" from three finalists in a beauty pageant, and they are invited back to his estate for aptitude tests to determine which of them it will be.

== Cast ==
- Inge Egger as Irene Mertens
- Jeanette Schultze as Ruth
- Waltraut Haas as Luise
- Susi Nicoletti as Chérie
- Wolf Albach-Retty as Robby Holm
- Gunther Philipp as Stefan Blitz
- Oskar Sima as Bierhaus
- Rudolf Carl as Krappl
- Cornelia Froboess as Cornelia, Sängerin
- Fritz von Friedl as Peter
- Ilse Peternell as Isolde
- Jutta Bornemann as Frl. Wurm
- Hilde Jaeger as Frl. Aufrecht
- Peter Preses as Dir. Maier
- Raoul Retzer as Gigantino
- Hellmuth Schönemaker
- Otto Stuppacher
- Theodor Grieg
- Rita Paul as Singer

== Bibliography ==
- Dassanowsky, Robert. Austrian Cinema: A History. McFarland, 2005.
