= The Silent Angel =

1954 film

- Directed by: Harald Reinl
- Written by: Harald Reinl; Maria von der Osten-Sacken
- Produced by: Maria von der Osten-Sacken
- Starring: Josefin Kipper; Robert Freitag; Christine Kaufmann
- Cinematography: Walter Riml
- Edited by: Hilde E. Grabow
- Music by: Bernhard Eichhorn
- Production company: Constantin Film
- Distributed by: Constantin Film
- Release date: 21 October 1954
- Running time: 94 minutes
- Country: West Germany
- Language: German

The Silent Angel (German: Der schweigende Engel) is a 1954 West German drama film directed by Harald Reinl and starring Josefin Kipper, Robert Freitag and Christine Kaufmann. It was shot at the Wiesbaden Studios in Hesse and on location in Kastel and Eltville and Kaub in the Rhine Valley. The film's sets were designed by the art director Heinrich Beisenherz.

== Cast ==
- Josefin Kipper as Sylva Verena
- Robert Freitag as Robert
- Christine Kaufmann as Angelika Helmer
- Gustav Waldau as Kolka
- Alice Treff as Miss Küfner
- Albert Florath as Pfarrer
- Gaby Reismüller as Frau Kohlsack
- Rolf Wanka as Kats
- Ingeborg Schöner as Elfie
- Siegfried Breuer Jr. as Andreas
- Werner Stock as Löffel
- Karin Dor as Erika
- Harry Hardt as Intendant
- Oscar Sabo as Onkel Franz
- Michael Gebühr as Rudi
- Maria Marietta as Charlott
- Leila Negra as Singer

== Bibliography ==
- Bock, Hans-Michael & Bergfelder, Tim. The Concise CineGraph. Encyclopedia of German Cinema. Berghahn Books, 2009.
- Fenner, Angelica. Race Under Reconstruction in German Cinema: Robert Stemmle's Toxi. University of Toronto Press, 2011.
- Lisanti, Tom & Paul, Louis Film Fatales: Women in Espionage Films and Television, 1962-1973. McFarland, 2002
