= Michael Heltau =

Austrian actor and singer (born 1933)

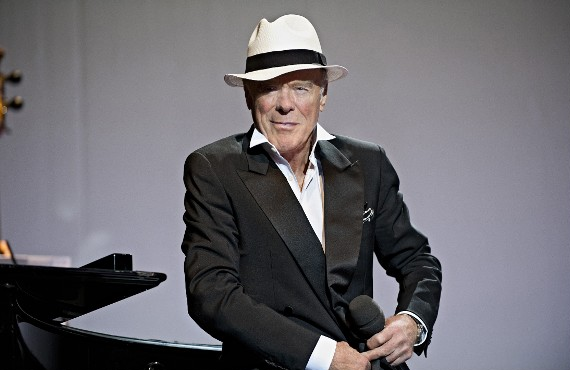
- Born: Michael Heltau; 5 July 1933 (age 92); Ingolstadt, Germany
- Education: University of Music and Performing Arts Vienna, Max Reinhardt Seminar
- Website: http://www.michaelheltau.com/

Michael Heltau (born 5 July 1933) is an Austrian actor and singer. He was born in Ingolstadt, Germany, and now lives in Austria.

== Early life and education ==
As a child, Heltau attended school in Salzkammergut. He then entered the Max Reinhardt Seminar at the University of Music and Performing Arts in Vienna. His first experience with theatre was a Vaudeville show that he saw with his parents at the age of seven, which he described as his "first great love".

== Selected filmography ==
- Hubertus Castle (1954)
- The Last Man (1955)
- Engagement at Wolfgangsee (1956)
- Lemke's Widow (1957)
- Panoptikum 59 (1959)
- Merry-Go-Round (1973)

== Television appearances ==
- Maximilian von Mexiko (1970)
- Manolescu – Die fast wahre Biographie eines Gauners (1972)
- Mino (1986)

Inspecteur derrick (1997)

== Decorations and awards ==
- 1970/1971: Karl Skraup Prize
- 1974: Josef Kainz Medal
- 1976: Golden Rathausmann
- 1985: Gold Honorary Medal of Vienna
- 1986: Kammerschauspieler
- 1993: Doyen of the Burgtheater
- 2000: Austrian Cross of Honour for Science and Art, 1st class
- 2003: Honorary Membership of the Burgtheater
- 2004: Honorary Membership of the Volksoper
- 2005: Gold Medal for services to the City of Vienna
- 26 November 2005: Nestroy Theatre Prize
- 2006: Merit Cross 1st Class of the Federal Republic of Germany
- 2008 "Golden Mozart Ring" of the Mozartgemeinde of Vienna
- 20 October 2010: Burgtheater Ring of Honour
