= Paprika (1959 film) =

1959 film

- Directed by: Kurt Wilhelm
- Written by: Johannes Engel
- Based on: Der Sprung in die Ehe, a play by Max Reimann; Otto Schwartz
- Starring: Willy Hagara; Violetta Ferrari; Waltraut Haas
- Cinematography: Dieter Wedekind
- Music by: Peter Igelhoff
- Production companies: Carlton Film; Eichberg-Film
- Distributed by: Deutsche Cosmopol Film
- Release date: 28 March 1959
- Running time: 91 minutes
- Country: West Germany
- Language: German

Paprika is a 1959 West German comedy film directed by Kurt Wilhelm, starring Willy Hagara, Violetta Ferrari and Waltraut Haas. It was adapted from the play, "Der Sprung in die Ehe," written Max Reimann and Otto Schwartz.

== Cast ==
- Willy Hagara as Bert
- Violetta Ferrari as Ilona
- Waltraut Haas as Anita
- Georg Thomalla as Paul
- Gregor von Rezzori as Tokasz, Ilonas Vater
- Peter Frankenfeld as Direktor
- Eddi Arent
- Margarete Haagen as Ludmilla
- Viktor Afritsch
- Elke Arendt as Rosie
- Michl Lang as Josef
- Iska Geri as Dora
- Uschi Siebert as Anni
- Carsta Löck as Erna
- Hans Stadtmüller
- Franz Baur
- Willy Schultes
- Willem Holsboer
- Tielman Brothers as Musical Quartett

== See also ==
- Paprika (1932)

== Bibliography ==
- Goble, Alan. The Complete Index to Literary Sources in Film. Walter de Gruyter, 1999.
