= Curth Flatow =

German screenwriter (1920–2011)

Curth Flatow (9 January 1920 – 4 June 2011) was a German dramatist and screenwriter who started his career in post-war Germany specializing in light comedy. Flatow was born in Berlin. Many of his plays have been adapted for the big screen. One of his more recent shows is Ein gesegnetes Alter (A Blessed Age, 1996), a vehicle for Johannes Heesters.

Flatow's 2000 memoir is entitled Am Kurfürstendamm fing es an. Erinnerungen aus einem Gedächtnis mit Lücken. He died in 2011 in Berlin.

== Plays ==
- 1960 : Das Fenster zum Flur (with Horst Pillau). Premiered in Berlin at the Hebbel-Theater
- 1966 : Vater einer Tochter (based on the film Meine Tochter und ich). Premiered in Berlin at the Komödie am Kurfürstendamm
- 1968 : Das Geld liegt auf der Bank. Premiered in Berlin at the Hebbel-Theater
- 1973 : Der Mann, der sich nicht traut. Premiered in Berlin at the Komödie am Kurfürstendamm

== Selected filmography ==
- King of Hearts (1947)
- When Men Cheat (1950)
- Dark Eyes (1951)
- The Chaste Libertine (1952)
- Dutch Girl (1953)
- The Bogeyman (1953)
- The Uncle from America (1953)
- The Telephone Operator (1954)
- How Do I Become a Film Star? (1955)
- Love, Dance and a Thousand Songs (1955)
- Kindermädchen für Papa gesucht (1957)
- The Simple Girl (1957)
- The Crammer (1958)
- Here I Am, Here I Stay (1959)
- What a Woman Dreams of in Springtime (1959)
- Yes, Women are Dangerous (1960)
- Crook and the Cross (1960)
- Her Most Beautiful Day (1962, based on the play Das Fenster zum Flur)
- My Daughter and I (1963)
- Honour Among Thieves (1966)
- The Wedding Trip (1969)
- The Merry War of Captain Pedro (1959)
- Schuld sind nur die Frauen (1982, TV film)
- Ich heirate eine Familie (1983–1986, TV series)
