= Iska Geri =

German actor and stage actor (1914-2002)

- Born: 28 April 1914; Stettin, Pomerania, Germany
- Died: 10 April 2002 (aged 87); Berlin, Germany
- Occupation: Actress
- Years active: 1949–1995 (film & TV)

Iska Geri (28 April 1914 – 10 April 2002) was a German film and television actress.

== Selected filmography ==
- Hello, Fraulein! (1949)
- Third from the Right (1950)
- The Veiled Lady (1951)
- That Can Happen to Anyone (1952)
- A Piece of Heaven (1957)
- Paprika (1959)
- Eine große Familie (1970, TV film)

== Bibliography ==
- Torsten Körner. Der kleine Mann als Star: Heinz Rühmann und seine Filme der 50er Jahre. Campus Verlag, 2001.
