= Alexander Trojan =

Austrian actor

- Born: 30 March 1914; Vienna, Austria
- Died: 19 September 1992 (aged 78); Vienna, Austria
- Occupation: Actor
- Years active: 1939-1977

Alexander Trojan (30 March 1914 – 19 September 1992) was an Austrian film actor. He appeared in more than 20 films between 1939 and 1977. He starred in the film Panoptikum 59, which was entered into the 9th Berlin International Film Festival.

== Selected filmography ==
- Woman in the River (1939)
- The Eternal Spring (1940)
- Gabriele Dambrone (1943)
- The Freckle (1948)
- No Sin on the Alpine Pastures (1950)
- Espionage (1955)
- Panoptikum 59 (1959)
- Das Riesenrad (1961)
