= Rose-Girl Resli =

1954 film

- Directed by: Harald Reinl
- Written by: Johanna Spyri (novel); Maria von der Osten-Sacken; Harald Reinl
- Produced by: Paul Hans Fritsch; Maria von der Osten-Sacken
- Starring: Christine Kaufmann; Josefin Kipper; Paul Klinger
- Cinematography: Walter Riml
- Edited by: Gertrud Petermann
- Music by: Bernhard Eichhorn
- Production company: EVA-Film
- Distributed by: Constantin Film
- Release date: 4 May 1954
- Running time: 85 minutes
- Country: West Germany
- Language: German

Rose-Girl Resli (German: Rosen-Resli) is a 1954 West German drama film directed by Harald Reinl and starring Christine Kaufmann, Josefin Kipper and Paul Klinger. It is based on the novella Rosenresli by Johanna Spyri. The film made the child actress Kaufmann into a star. It was the debut film of the actress Karin Dor, who later married the director. It was shot at the Wiesbaden Studios in Hesse and on location in the vicinity. The film's sets were designed by the art director Heinrich Beisenherz.

== Cast ==
- Christine Kaufmann as Resli
- Josefin Kipper as Herta Wieland
- Paul Klinger as Dr. Schumann
- Katharina Mayberg as Christine Rohrbach
- Arno Assmann as Fred Rohrbach
- Käthe Haack as Sorgemutter
- Olga Chekhova as Mrs. von Weidersheim
- Trude Haefelin as Vera Fürst
- Otto Gebühr as Jakob
- Gusti Wolf as Mrs. Neuhans
- Franz Fröhlich as Obergärtner Schmidt
- Anne-Marie Hanschke as Anna Schmidt
- Walter Koch as Fritz Schmidt
- Walter Sedlmayr as Theo
- Hans Epskamp
- Gerhard Ritter
- Sylvia Gray
- Engelbert Queitsch as Mister Denner
- Gisela Jonas as Gisela Gregori
- Wolfgang Reichmann
- Karin Dor
- Kurt Großkurth
- Heinrich Gretler
- Werner Gerhard
- Kurt Hepperlin
- Trude Hänsler as Kathi
- Ellen Mietze-Siebert
- Claudia Roman
- Hans Schwarze

== Bibliography ==
- Bock, Hans-Michael; Bergfelder, Tim, eds. (2009). The Concise Cinegraph: Encyclopaedia of German Cinema. New York: Berghahn Books. ISBN 978-1-57181-655-9.
