= Conchita and the Engineer =

1954 film

Macumba
- Directed by: Franz Eichhorn; Hans Hinrich
- Written by: Franz Taut (novel); Ilse Lotz-Dupont
- Starring: Paul Hartmann; Vanja Orico; Siegfried Schürenberg
- Cinematography: Edgar Eichhorn; Franz Weihmayr
- Edited by: Walter von Bonhorst
- Music by: Ana Pietric; Walter Schultz Porto Alegre
- Production companies: Astra Films; Franconia-Film
- Distributed by: Europa-Filmverleih
- Release dates: 24 September 1954; (Europe); May 11,1955 (US)
- Running time: 95 minutes
- Countries: Brazil; West Germany
- Language: German

Macumba (German: Conchita und der Ingenieur/ transl. Conchita and the Engineer) is a 1954 Brazilian-German adventure film directed by Franz Eichhorn and Hans Hinrich and starring Paul Hartmann, Vanja Orico and Robert Freitag. It was based on a novel by Franz Taut. It was shot at the Babelsberg Studios in Potsdam near Berlin and on location in Brazil. The film's Brazilian title (see poster at right) translates as Conchita, Virgin of the Amazon. It was released in English-speaking countries as Macumba, playing on a double bill with Ed Wood's Bride of the Monster (1955).

== Cast ==
- Paul Hartmann as Prof. Dahlheim
- Vanja Orico as Conchita
- Robert Freitag as Cyll Farney
- Josefin Kipper as Irene
- Herbert Hübner
- Siegfried Schürenberg
- Ary as Der Indier
- Charlott Daudert
- Oliver Hassencamp
- Henry Horman
- Gilberto Martinho
- Panos Papadopulos
- Karl-Heinz Peters

== Bibliography ==
- Goble, Alan. The Complete Index to Literary Sources in Film. Walter de Gruyter, 1999.
