= The White Adventure =

1952 film directed by Arthur Maria Rabenalt

- German film poster
- German: Das weiße Abenteuer
- Directed by: Arthur Maria Rabenalt
- Written by: Robert Gilbert; Frank Gontard; Wolf Neumeister
- Produced by: Günther Stapenhorst
- Starring: Joe Stöckel; Lucie Englisch; Adrian Hoven
- Cinematography: Willy Faktorovitch; Jean Marie Guinot; Georges Markman
- Edited by: Doris Zeltmann
- Music by: Emil Ferstl; Robert Gilbert
- Production company: Carlton-Film
- Distributed by: National-Filmverleih
- Release date: 8 February 1952
- Running time: 90 minutes
- Country: West Germany
- Language: German

The White Adventure (German: Das weiße Abenteuer) is a 1952 West German comedy crime film directed by Arthur Maria Rabenalt and starring Joe Stöckel, Lucie Englisch and Adrian Hoven. It set at a ski resort on the Bavarian border with Austria, where smuggling is taking place.

== Cast ==
- Joe Stöckel as Josef Stutzinger
- Lucie Englisch as Franzi Schlott
- Adrian Hoven as Dr. Peter Wiedemann
- Josefin Kipper as Lotte Wendel
- Margot Rupp as Katharina Brandl
- Marianne Wischmann as Lydia Bartnik
- Fee von Reichlin as Winii Pardubitz
- Willem Holsboer as Alois Brandl
- Franz Muxeneder as Nikolaus
- Hugo Lindinger as Bürgermeister
- Vera Complojer as Frau Elise
- Armin Dahlen as Skilehrer Fasser
- Gerd Frickhöffer as Her Wimmer
- Curt A. Tichy as Mr. Keates
