= Call It a Day (play) =

Call It a Day is a play by the British writer Dodie Smith first staged in 1935. Her most successful play, its initial West End run at the Globe Theatre lasted for 509 performances. The original cast included Owen Nares, Fay Compton, Austin Trevor, Muriel George, Patricia Hilliard, Valerie Taylor and Marie Lohr. The play was produced by the impresario Basil Dean. In 1936 it transferred to Broadway where it ran for 194 performances at the Morosco.

In 1937 it was adapted into a film of the same title by the Hollywood studio Warner Brothers. Archie Mayo directed a cast featuring Olivia de Havilland, Ian Hunter, Roland Young and Anita Louise. A 1956 German film The First Day of Spring was also inspired by the play.

== Bibliography ==
- Wearing, J.P. The London Stage 1930-1939: A Calendar of Productions, Performers, and Personnel. Rowman & Littlefield, 2014.
