= Roses from the South (1954 film) =

1954 film

- Directed by: Franz Antel
- Written by: Edgar Kahn
- Produced by: Heinz Bohner; Viktor von Struwe
- Starring: Maria Holst; Gustav Fröhlich; Karl Schönböck
- Cinematography: Hans Heinz Theyer
- Edited by: Ursula Winter
- Music by: Lotar Olias
- Production company: Victor von Struve Filmproduktion
- Distributed by: Panorama-Film
- Release date: 30 April 1954
- Running time: 102 minutes
- Country: West Germany
- Language: German

Roses from the South (German: Rosen aus dem Süden) is a 1954 West German comedy film directed by Franz Antel and starring Maria Holst, Gustav Fröhlich, and Karl Schönböck. It was shot at the Wiesbaden Studios in Hesse and on location in Cannes and Nice on the French Riviera. The film's sets were designed by the art directors Fritz Maurischat and Karl Werner.

== Main cast ==
- Maria Holst as Marylin Parker
- Gustav Fröhlich as Julien de Costa
- Karl Schönböck as Sergius Konstantin
- Susi Nicoletti as Janine Rocca
- Oskar Sima as Barsoni
- Gunther Philipp as Otto Pfennig
- Hannelore Bollmann as Dora Köslin
- Wilfried Seyferth as Pierre
- Ilse Peternell as Hilla Pfennig
- Malte Jaeger as Protokollchef
- Jutta Bornemann as Fräulein Putzke
- Theodor Loos as Minister

== Bibliography ==
- Bock, Hans-Michael; Bergfelder, Tim, eds. (2009). The Concise Cinegraph: Encyclopaedia of German Cinema. New York: Berghahn Books. ISBN 978-1-57181-655-9.
