= Ethel Reschke =

German actress

- Born: 24 April 1911; Lauenburg, Pomerania, Germany (now Lębork, Pomorskie, Poland)
- Died: 5 June 1992 (aged 81); Berlin, Germany
- Occupation: Actress
- Years active: 1931–1977

Ethel Reschke (24 April 1911 – 5 June 1992) was a German actress. She appeared in more than 70 films and television shows between 1931 and 1977.

== Selected filmography ==
- Mädchen in Uniform (1931)
- Paul and Pauline (1936)
- By a Silken Thread (1938)
- Who's Kissing Madeleine? (1939)
- In the Name of the People (1939)
- The Three Codonas (1940)
- The Unfaithful Eckehart (1940)
- Romance in a Minor Key (1943)
- Große Freiheit Nr. 7 (1944)
- A Beautiful Day (1944)
- Don't Play with Love (1949)
- Queen of the Night (1951)
- Don't Ask My Heart (1952)
- My Wife Is Being Stupid (1952)
- Three Days of Fear (1952)
- The Colourful Dream (1952)
- The Chaste Libertine (1952)
- The Rose of Stamboul (1953)
- The Uncle from America (1953)
- Christina (1953)
- Dutch Girl (1953)
- The Golden Plague (1954)
- My Aunt, Your Aunt (1956)
- The Captain from Köpenick (1956)
- Between Munich and St. Pauli (1957)
- Candidates for Marriage (1958)
- We Cellar Children (1960)
- Jeder stirbt für sich allein (1962, TV film)
- Tim Frazer (1963, TV miniseries)
