= Espionage (1955 film) =

1955 film

- Directed by: Franz Antel
- Written by: Alexander Lernet-Holenia; Kurt Nachmann
- Produced by: Franz Hoffmann; Erich von Neusser
- Starring: Ewald Balser; Barbara Rütting; Gerhard Riedmann
- Cinematography: Hanns Matula; Hans Heinz Theyer
- Edited by: Arnfried Heyne
- Music by: Willy Schmidt-Gentner
- Production companies: Hope Film; Neusser-Film
- Distributed by: Sascha Film; UFA (W. Germany)
- Release date: 18 April 1955
- Running time: 100 minutes
- Country: Austria
- Language: German

Espionage (German: Spionage) is a 1955 Austrian historical spy drama film directed by Franz Antel and starring Ewald Balser, Barbara Rütting and Gerhard Riedmann. It was shot at the Sievering Studios and on location in Vienna. The film's sets were designed by the art director Felix Smetana. It was based on the real story of Alfred Redl, an officer serving with Austrian Military Intelligence who was also secretly spying for the hostile Russian Empire before the First World War.

== Cast ==
- Ewald Balser as Oberst Redl
- Barbara Rütting as Nadeschda
- Gerhard Riedmann as Hauptmann Angelis
- Oskar Werner as Leutnant Zeno Von Baumgarten
- Marte Harell as Gräfin Lichtenfels
- Hannelore Bollmann as Pauline Von Heymeneck
- Rudolf Forster as Chef Des Generalstabes, Von Heymeneck
- Attila Hörbiger as Dr. Hartmuth
- Erik Frey as Oberst Rabansky
- Heinz Moog as Baron Letten
- Karl Ehmann as Leopold, Diener Bei Lichtenfels
- Hermann Erhardt as Steidl
- C.W. Fernbach as Rittmeister Weidler
- Harry Hardt as General Maximoff
- Kurt Jaggberg as Sabrenin
- Alexander Trojan as Baron Korff
- Ernst Waldbrunn as Ebinger
- Grete Sellier as Gast

== Bibliography ==
- Fritsche, Maria. Homemade Men in Postwar Austrian Cinema: Nationhood, Genre and Masculinity. Berghahn Books, 2013.
