= The Charming Young Lady (film) =

1953 film

- Directed by: Georg Thomalla
- Written by: Vineta Bastian-Klinger; Rolf Dortenwald
- Produced by: Heinz Laaser
- Starring: Georg Thomalla; Herta Staal; Gisela Fackeldey
- Cinematography: Bruno Timm
- Edited by: Lilian Seng
- Music by: Ralph Benatzky; Georg Haentzschel
- Production company: Algefa Film
- Distributed by: Constantin Film
- Release date: 25 December 1953
- Running time: 93 minutes
- Country: West Germany
- Language: German

The Charming Young Lady (German: Bezauberndes Fräulein) is a 1953 West German musical comedy film directed by Georg Thomalla and starring Thomalla, Herta Staal and Gisela Fackeldey. It is in the operetta film tradition and is based on the 1933 stage work of the same title by Ralph Benatzky. It was shot at the Spandau Studios in Berlin and on location in the city including around Wannsee. The film's sets were designed by the art director Rolf Zehetbauer.

== Cast ==
- Georg Thomalla as Paul Norman
- Herta Staal as Annette
- Gisela Fackeldey as Rosette
- Wilfried Seyferth as Felix Bernard
- Irene Adam as Hanni, Schülerin von Felix
- Carin Bäumler as Lilo, Schülerin von Felix
- Hans Leibelt as Schokoladenkönig Braun
- Käte Pontow as Luise, seine Tochter
- Ingrid Rentsch as Eva, Schülerin von Felix
- Karl Schönböck as Hektor Kranz
- Petra Unkel as Julie, Hausmädchen
- Ursula von Manescul as Christa, Schülerin von Felix
- Ernst Waldow as Ministerialdirigent Hanau

== Bibliography ==
- Bock, Hans-Michael & Bergfelder, Tim. The Concise CineGraph. Encyclopedia of German Cinema. Berghahn Books, 2009.
