= Marriage for One Night =

1953 film directed by Viktor Tourjansky

- Directed by: Viktor Tourjansky
- Written by: Josef Berger (play); Franz Seitz (play); Karl Georg Külb
- Produced by: Jochen Genzow; Franz Seitz
- Starring: Gustav Fröhlich; Hannelore Bollmann; Adrian Hoven
- Cinematography: Franz Koch
- Edited by: Gertrud Hinz-Nischwitz
- Music by: Ernst Jäger
- Production company: Ariston Film
- Distributed by: Neue Filmverleih
- Release date: 18 February 1953
- Running time: 91 minutes
- Country: West Germany
- Language: German

Marriage for One Night (German: Ehe für eine Nacht) is a 1953 West German comedy film directed by Viktor Tourjansky and starring Gustav Fröhlich, Hannelore Bollmann and Adrian Hoven. It was shot at the Carlton Studios in Munich. The film's sets were designed by the art directors Ernst H. Albrecht and Arne Flekstad.

== Synopsis ==
The photographer Hans Hoppe is an inveterate gambler as well as being the proud father of three children. His wealthy brother in America, Pedro, offers to pay a dowry for his three children to get married, but Hans uses the money to pay off his gambling debts at the racetrack. Things are thrown awry when Pedro arrives on a visit. Hans gets his children to act out the role of loving spouses, but when of one of his sons' "wife" falls in love with Pedro, he sees through the trick. He ultimately forgives his brother for his scam.

== Cast ==
- Gustav Fröhlich as Pedro
- Hannelore Bollmann as Helga
- Adrian Hoven as Komma
- Gunnar Möller as Putzi
- Ingrid Pan as Jutta
- Katharina Mayberg as Anita
- Hans Leibelt as Hans Hoppe
- Rudolf Schündler as Turnegger
- Viktor Afritsch as Schauspieler
- Laya Raki as Tänzerin / Dancer
- Fritz Lafontaine as Rundfunkreporter
- Horst Winter as Jonny Reiner / Singer

== Bibliography ==
- Hans-Michael Bock and Tim Bergfelder. The Concise Cinegraph: An Encyclopedia of German Cinema. Berghahn Books, 2009.
