= Hans Heinz Theyer =

Austrian cinematographer

- Born: 5 August 1910; Vienna, Austrian Empire
- Died: October 18, 1961 (aged 51); Vienna, Austria
- Occupation: Cinematographer
- Years active: 1936-1962 (film)

Hans Heinz Theyer (August 5, 1910 – October 18, 1961) was an Austrian cinematographer. He worked on around forty films, including The Emperor Waltz (1953).

== Selected filmography ==
- Gulliver's Travels (1924)
- Flowers from Nice (1936)
- No Sin on the Alpine Pastures (1950)
- Wedding in the Hay (1951)
- The Mine Foreman (1952)
- Hello Porter (1952)
- Ideal Woman Sought (1952)
- The Emperor Waltz (1953)
- Roses from the South (1954)
- Marriage Sanitarium (1955)
- Espionage (1955)
- Emperor's Ball (1956)
- Deutsche Wochenschau (1945) *
- Love, Girls and Soldiers (1958)
- When the Bells Sound Clearly (1959)
- No Kissing Under Water (1962)

== Bibliography ==
- Fritsche, Maria. Homemade Men in Postwar Austrian Cinema: Nationhood, Genre and Masculinity. Berghahn Books, 2013.
