= Grethe Weiser =

German actress (1903–1970)

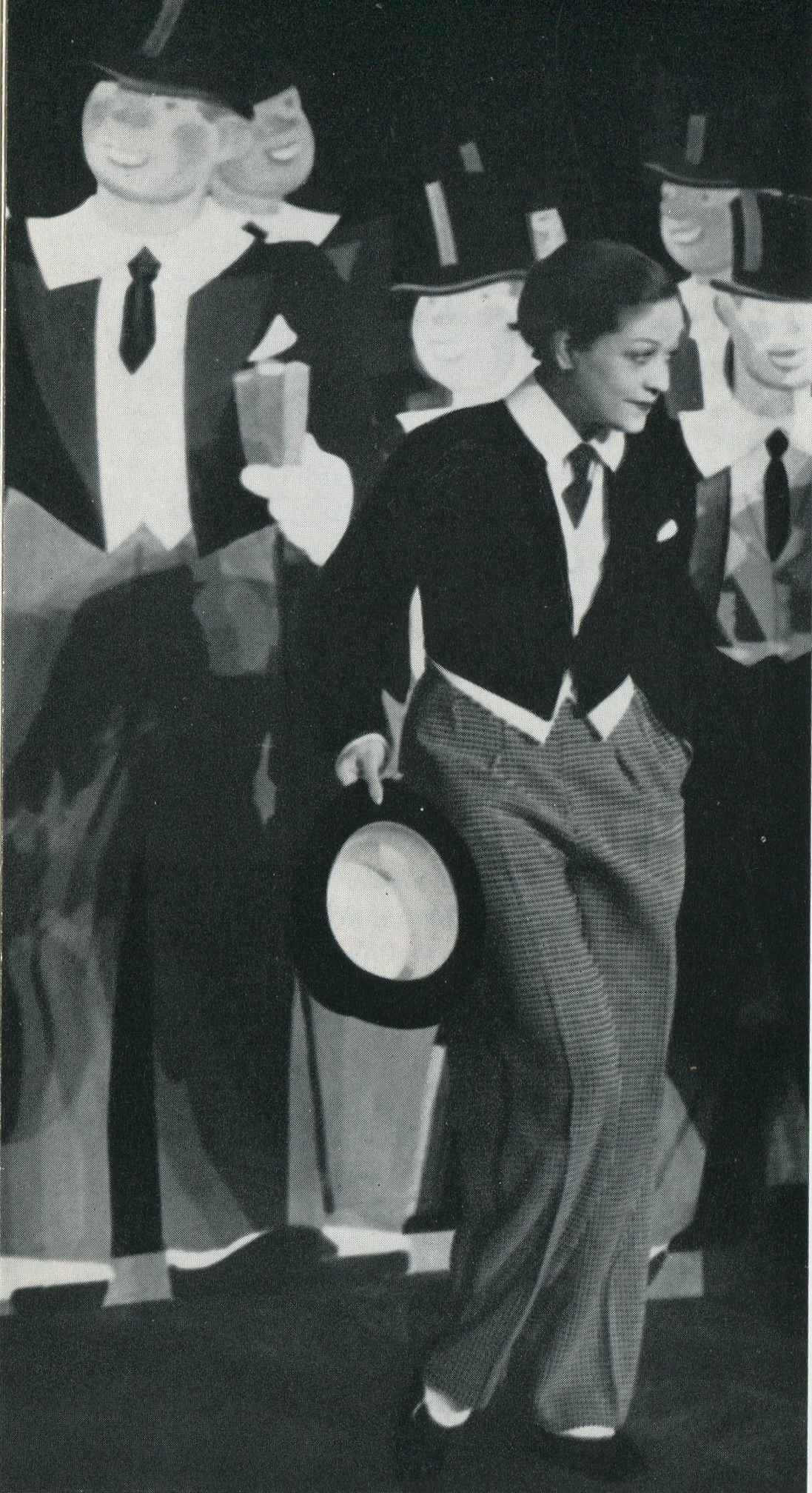
Weise on stage at the Berlin Wintergarten theatre, 1932 Signature Grethe Weiser

Grethe Weiser (German: [ˈɡʁeːtə ˈvaɪzɐ]; 27 February 1903 – 2 October 1970) was a German actress.

== Biography ==
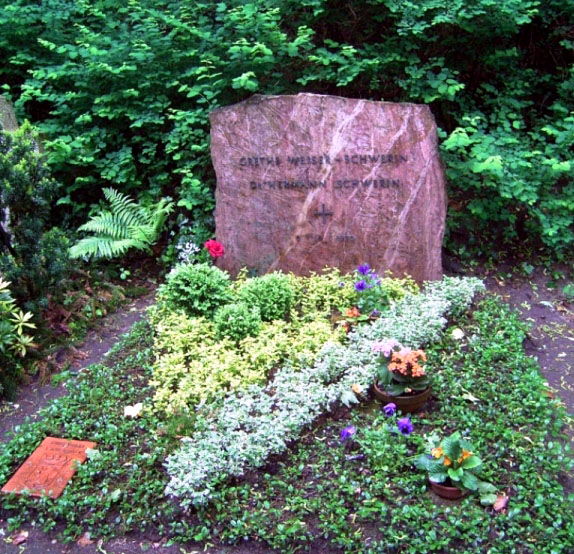
Grave of Grethe Weiser and her husband Dr Hermann Schwerin in Berlin in 2006

Born in Hanover, she spent her childhood in Dresden. She escaped from her dominant and sometimes violent father by marrying a Jewish confectionery manufacturer in 1920. Her only child, a son, was born in 1922. Quite quickly she established herself in the cabaret scene in Berlin, especially after her husband became a leaseholder of a nightclub on the Kurfürstendamm. Her film debut came soon after in 1927.

Weiser had a lifelong relationship with Hermann Schwerin, a UFA film producer, which began in 1934, but the couple were not married until 1958. Her previous marriage had been dissolved in 1934. Weiser avoided becoming a member of the Nazi Party. She managed to finance and arrange for her previous husband and her son to survive the Nazi years in Switzerland, as well as at the same time continue her career in Germany.

She died after a road traffic accident, aged 67, in Untersteinbach near Bad Tölz in Bavaria and is buried in an honorary grave at the Heerstraße Cemetery in Berlin.

== Selected filmography ==
- Salto Mortale (1931)
- Gretel Wins First Prize (1933)
- Just Once a Great Lady (1934)
- Bashful Felix (1934)
- One Too Many on Board (1935)
- The Man with the Paw (1935)
- The Schimeck Family (1935)
- Fresh Wind from Canada (1935)
- His Late Excellency (1935)
- Fräulein Veronika (1936)
- Martha (1936)
- Hilde and the Volkswagen (1936)
- The Abduction of the Sabine Women (1936)
- Escapade (1936)
- Men Without a Fatherland (1937)
- My Friend Barbara (1937)
- The Divine Jetta (1937)
- Women for Golden Hill (1938)
- Woman at the Wheel (1939)
- Ursula Under Suspicion (1939)
- Mistake of the Heart (1939)
- Marriage in Small Doses (1939)
- Between Hamburg and Haiti (1940)
- Left of the Isar, Right of the Spree (1940)
- We Make Music (1942)
- The Great Love (1942)
- A Waltz with You (1943)
- The Buchholz Family (1944)
- Dog Days (1944)
- Marriage of Affection (1944)
- The Master Detective (1944)
- Somewhere in Berlin (1946)
- Everything Will Be Better in the Morning (1948)
- Tromba (1949)
- My Wife's Friends (1949)
- The Trip to Marrakesh (1949)
- Artists' Blood (1949)
- Nothing But Coincidence (1949)
- Love '47 (1949)
- Amico (1949)
- Third from the Right (1950)
- Gabriela (1950)
- When Men Cheat (1950)
- Maya of the Seven Veils (1951)
- Fanfares of Love (1951)
- Dance Into Happiness (1951)
- The Mine Foreman (1952)
- Holiday From Myself (1952)
- The Chaste Libertine (1952)
- The Prince of Pappenheim (1952)
- Queen of the Arena (1952)
- Rose of the Mountain (1952)
- The Empress of China (1953)
- The Rose of Stamboul (1953)
- The Cousin from Nowhere (1953)
- Lady's Choice (1953)
- Money from the Air (1953)
- Hooray, It's a Boy! (1953)
- Dutch Girl (1953)
- The Uncle from America (1953)
- Money from the Air (1954)
- The Great Lola (1954)
- The Seven Dresses of Katrin (1954)
- It Was Always So Nice With You (1954)
- As Long as There Are Pretty Girls (1955)
- My Leopold (1955)
- Secrets of the City (1955)
- Father's Day (1955)
- The Double Husband (1955)
- My Children and I (1955)
- Three Days Confined to Barracks (1955)
- And Who Is Kissing Me? (1956)
- Fruit in the Neighbour's Garden (1956)
- Just Once a Great Lady (1957)
- Aunt Wanda from Uganda (1957)
- Lemke's Widow (1957)
- The Legs of Dolores (1957)
- That's No Way to Land a Man (1959)
- The Domestic Tyrant (1959)
- The Young Sinner (1960)
- Freddy and the Melody of the Night (1960)
- We Will Never Part (1960)
- Freddy and the Millionaire (1961)
- When the Music Plays at Wörthersee (1962)
