= Anton Kutter =

German film director and screenwriter

- Born: Anton Kutter; 13 June 1903; Biberach an der Riß, Germany
- Died: February 1, 1985 (aged 81); Biberach an der Riß, Germany
- Occupations: film director, screenwriter and film producer
- Years active: 1926–1945

Anton Kutter (13 June 1903, in Biberach an der Riß – 1 February 1985, in Biberach) was a German film director and screenwriter. He studied mechanical engineering at Stuttgart Technical University.

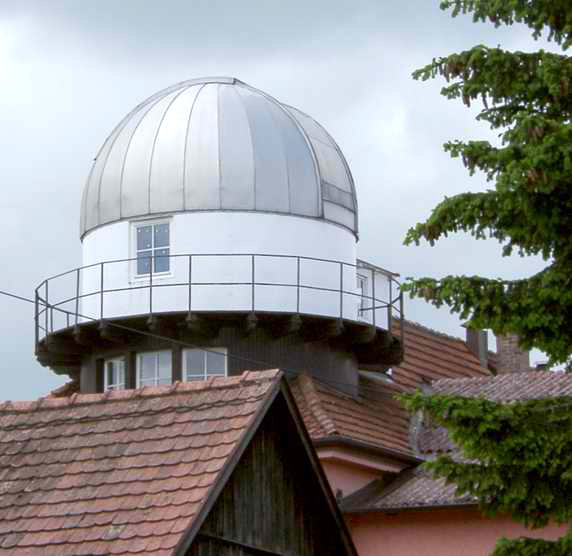
Kutter's observatory in Biberach

In 1926 Kutter went to Cologne and joined the Phototechnical Laboratory, and created his first films the same year. From 1931 to 1947 he worked for the Bavaria Film in Munich. In 1937 he made the science fiction movie, Weltraumschiff I startet [Space Ship I Launches], a story about a first Moon flight which he dated on 13 June 1963, his 60th birthday. Kutter was awarded two golden medals at the Venice Biennale.

Already at age 12, Kutter manufactured his first refracting telescope from lenses taken from a toy cinematograph. Later he became known to Anton Staus (1872-1955) who introduced him to the theory of Karl Fritsch's "Brachy" telescopes. He invented the Schiefspiegler telescope which is a modified Cassegrain reflector featuring superb optical definition due to an off-axis secondary mirror. An obituary was published by Roger W. Sinnott in Sky & Telescope.

== Selected filmography ==
- Frau Sixta (1938)
- Dark Clouds Over the Dachstein (1953)
- Open Your Window (1953)
- The Song of Kaprun (1955)
