= The Royal Waltz (1955 film) =

1955 film directed by Viktor Tourjansky

- Directed by: Victor Tourjansky
- Written by: Emil Burri; Walter Forster
- Produced by: Klaus Stapenhorst
- Starring: Marianne Koch; Michael Cramer; Linda Geiser
- Cinematography: Franz Koch
- Music by: Carl Loubé
- Production companies: Bavaria Film; Carlton Film
- Distributed by: Neue Filmverleih
- Release date: 6 October 1955
- Running time: 93 minutes
- Country: West Germany
- Language: German

The Royal Waltz (German: Königswalzer) is a 1955 West German musical film romance film directed by Victor Tourjansky and starring Marianne Koch, Michael Cramer and Linda Geiser. It is a remake of the 1935 film of the same name, part of the tradition of operetta films. It was shot at the Bavaria Studios in Munich and the Carlton Studios in the same city. Location shooting took place in Munich's Englischer Garten and Nymphenburg Palace. The film's sets were designed by the art director Hermann Warm.

== Synopsis ==
Austrian Count von Tettenbach is sent by Emperor Franz Joseph to Munich to ask the King of Bavaria Maximilian for the hand in marriage of his daughter Prinzessin Elisabeth. While there he falls in love with Therese, the daughter of a cafe owner, and eventually marries her.

== Cast ==
- Marianne Koch as Therese
- Michael Cramer as Graf Ferdinand von Tettenbach
- Joe Stöckel as Ludwig Tomasoni
- Linda Geiser as Prinzessin Elisabeth 'Sissi'
- Hans Fitz as König Max II
- Hans Leibelt as Minister Dönniges
- Sabine Hahn as Anni Tomasoni
- Ellen Frank as Herzogin
- Harry Hardt as Leutnant Hakenstaller
- Harry Halm as Zeremoniemeister
- Hans Danninger as Ober Alois
- Walter Sedlmayr as Konditor Franz
- Willy Rösner as Revolutionär Pfandl
- Willem Holsboer as Revolutionär Brandmeyer

== Bibliography ==
- Bock, Hans-Michael & Bergfelder, Tim. The Concise CineGraph. Encyclopedia of German Cinema. Berghahn Books, 2009.
- Waldman, Harry. Nazi Films in America, 1933–1942. McFarland, 2008.
