= The Uncle from America =

1953 film directed by Carl Boese

- German: Der Onkel aus Amerika
- Directed by: Carl Boese
- Written by: Ferdinand Altenkirch (play); Curth Flatow; Peter Paulsen
- Produced by: Artur Brauner; Heinz Laaser
- Starring: Hans Moser; Georg Thomalla; Joe Stöckel
- Cinematography: Albert Benitz
- Edited by: Johanna Meisel
- Music by: Lotar Olias
- Production company: CCC Film
- Distributed by: Prisma Film
- Release date: 26 January 1953
- Running time: 98 minutes
- Country: West Germany
- Language: German

The Uncle from America (German: Der Onkel aus Amerika) is a 1953 West German comedy film directed by Carl Boese and starring Hans Moser, Georg Thomalla and Joe Stöckel. It was based on a play by Ferdinand Altenkirch which had previously been made into the 1932 film No Money Needed. It was shot at the Spandau Studios in Berlin. The film's sets were designed by the art director Erich Grave and Walter Kutz.

== Cast ==
- Hans Moser as Thomas Theodor Hoffmann
- Georg Thomalla as Bodo Schmidt
- Joe Stöckel as Bankdirektor Brenner
- Grethe Weiser as Gertrud Hartung
- Waltraut Haas as Elisabeth Hartung
- Ethel Reschke as Elli, Sekretärin
- Ruth Stephan as Rosa, Dienstmädchen
- Arno Paulsen as Hermann Hartung
- Walter Gross as Haberland, Gerichtsvollzieher
- Wolfgang Neuss as Conferencier
- Joe Furtner
- Herbert Kiper as Rottmann, Sparkassendirektor
- Gert Kollat as Geissler, Hoteldirektor
- Ernst Sattler as Bürgermeister
- Erhard Ey-Steineck as Berndorf, Fabrikant
- Herbert Weissbach as Dr. Ernst
- Jur Arten
- Sunshine Quartett as singer
- Horst Winter as singer
- Agnes Windeck as Telefonpartner in England

== Bibliography ==
- Goble, Alan. The Complete Index to Literary Sources in Film. Walter de Gruyter, 1999.
