= Lemke's Widow (1957 film) =

1957 film

- Directed by: Helmut Weiss
- Written by: Heinz Pauck; Heinz Oskar Wuttig
- Starring: Grethe Weiser; Brigitte Grothum; Michael Heltau
- Cinematography: Erich Claunigk
- Edited by: Klaus Dudenhöfer
- Music by: Martin Böttcher
- Production company: Standard-Filmverleih
- Distributed by: Europa Film
- Release date: 19 July 1957
- Running time: 92 minutes
- Country: West Germany
- Language: German

Lemke's Widow (German: Lemkes sel. Witwe) is a 1957 West German comedy film directed by Helmut Weiss and starring Grethe Weiser, Brigitte Grothum, and Michael Heltau. It is a remake of the 1928 film of the same title. It was shot at the Wandsbek Studios in Hamburg and on location in the city. The film's sets were designed by the art director Erich Kettelhut.

== Cast ==
- Grethe Weiser as Witwe Else Lemke
- Brigitte Grothum as Lore
- Michael Heltau as Prinz Eduard
- Maria Sebaldt as Edith Gutsche
- Carla Hagen as Carla Mühlberger
- Paul Westermeier as Otto Gutsche
- Peer Schmidt as Baron Nassen
- Paul Hörbiger as Fürst Ludwig
- Uwe Friedrichsen as Student Jochen

== Bibliography ==
- Bock, Hans-Michael; Bergfelder, Tim, eds. (2009). The Concise Cinegraph: Encyclopaedia of German Cinema. New York: Berghahn Books. ISBN 978-1-57181-655-9.
