= Joe Stöckel =

German actor (1894–1959)

- Born: 27 September 1894; Munich, Bavaria, German Empire
- Died: 14 June 1959 (aged 64); Munich, Bavaria, West Germany
- Occupations: Actor, Director, Writer
- Years active: 1914–1959 (film)

Josef "Joe" Stöckel (27 September 1894, Munich – 14 June 1959) was a German actor, screenwriter and film director.

== Selected filmography ==
=== Actor ===
- The Villa in Tiergarten Park (1927)
- The Champion Shot (1932)
- S.A.-Mann Brand (1933)
- The Master Detective (1933)
- At Blonde Kathrein's Place (1934)
- Between Heaven and Earth (1934)
- The Unsuspecting Angel (1936)
- There Were Two Bachelors (1936)
- A Doctor of Conviction (1936)
- The Sinful Village (1940)
- Two in One Suit (1950)
- Trouble in Paradise (1950)
- Wild West in Upper Bavaria (1951)
- The White Adventure (1952)
- The Chaste Libertine (1952)
- The Imaginary Invalid (1952)
- Monks, Girls and Hungarian Soldiers (1952)
- The Uncle from America (1953)
- The Monastery's Hunter (1953)
- The Sinful Village (1954)
- The Sweetest Fruits (1954)
- The Royal Waltz (1955)
- The Spanish Fly (1955)
- The Double Husband (1955)
- Through the Forests and Through the Trees (1956)
- Two Bavarians in St. Pauli (1956)
- Love, Summer and Music (1956)
- Two Bavarians in the Jungle (1957)
- Two Bavarians in the Harem (1957)
- Between Munich and St. Pauli (1957)
- Twelve Girls and One Man (1959)

=== Director ===
- Der Etappenhase (1937)
- The Right to Love (1939)
- A Heart Beats for You (1949)
- Trouble in Paradise (1950)
- Marriage Strike (1953)
