= Gisela Fackeldey =

German actress (1920–1986)

- Born: 13 November 1920; Cologne, Germany
- Died: 21 October 1986 (aged 65); West Berlin, West Germany
- Occupation: Actress
- Years active: 1949–1986

Gisela Fackeldey (13 November 1920 – 21 October 1986) was a German actress. She appeared in more than 45 films and television shows from 1949 to 1986.

== Selected filmography ==
- Who Is This That I Love? (1950)
- Kissing Is No Sin (1950)
- Desire (1951)
- The Cloister of Martins (1951)
- Dark Clouds Over the Dachstein (1953)
- The Charming Young Lady (1953)
- Love's Awakening (1953)
- Stefanie (1958)
- Liselotte of the Palatinate (1966)
- The Bitter Tears of Petra von Kant (1972)
- Martha (1974)
