= Dutch Girl =

1953 film

- Directed by: Johann Alexander Hübler-Kahla
- Written by: Curth Flatow; Franz Gribitz; J.A. Hübler-Kahla
- Produced by: Artur Brauner; Heinz Laaser
- Starring: Sonja Ziemann; Gunnar Möller; Hans Moser
- Cinematography: Bruno Timm
- Edited by: Max Brenner
- Music by: Heino Gaze; Werner Müller
- Production company: CCC Film
- Distributed by: Herzog Film
- Release date: 30 July 1953
- Running time: 93 minutes
- Country: West Germany
- Language: German

Dutch Girl (German: Hollandmädel) is a 1953 German musical comedy film directed by Johann Alexander Hübler-Kahla and starring Sonja Ziemann, Gunnar Möller and Hans Moser. It was shot at the Spandau Studios in Berlin. The sets were designed by the art director Rolf Zehetbauer.

== Synopsis ==
The film portrays the rivalry between a cheesemaker and a flower producer and the eventual love affair between their children.

== Cast ==
- Sonja Ziemann as Antje
- Gunnar Möller as Jan
- Hans Moser as Knoop
- Grethe Weiser as Frau Quietsch
- Rudolf Platte as Brisling
- Paul Henckels as Leuwendahl
- Oskar Karlweis as Schmidtchen
- Carsta Löck as Frau Schmidtchen
- Wilfried Seyferth as Quietsch
- Ethel Reschke as Molly
- Rolf Weih as Polizeioffizier
- Wolfgang Neuss as Mr. Zimt
- Henry Lorenzen as Mr. Sugar
- Eduard Linkers as Polizeiwachtmeister
- Ursula Herking as Dienstmädchen
- Gert Kollat
- Wolfgang Jansen
- Bruce Low as Singer
- Werner Müller as himself
- Die Travellers as Singers
- Herbert Weissbach

== Bibliography ==
- Hans-Michael Bock and Tim Bergfelder. The Concise Cinegraph: An Encyclopedia of German Cinema. Berghahn Books, 2009.
