= Carla Hagen =

German actress (1927–2020)

- Born: 11 September 1927; Hamburg, Germany
- Died: 27 January 2020 (aged 92); Hamburg, Germany
- Other name: Carla-Maria Hagen
- Occupation: Actress
- Years active: 1951–1999 (film and television)

Carla Hagen (11 September 1927 – 27 January 2020) was a German film and television actress.

Hagen died in Hamburg on 27 January 2020, at the age of 92.

== Selected filmography ==
- Professor Nachtfalter (1951)
- The Happy Village (1955)
- Yes, Yes, Love in Tyrol (1955)
- The Double Husband (1955)
- The First Day of Spring (1956)
- If We All Were Angels (1956)
- Black Forest Melody (1956)
- Lemke's Widow (1957)
- Two Hearts in May (1958)
- Love, Girls and Soldiers (1958)
- Girl from Hong Kong (1961)

== Bibliography ==
- Klossner, Michael. The Europe of 1500-1815 on Film and Television: A Worldwide Filmography of Over 2550 Works, 1895 Through 2000. McFarland, 2002.
