= Josefin Kipper =

Austrian actress

- Born: 27 December 1928; Vienna, Austria
- Died: 23 August 1981 (aged 52)
- Occupation: Actress
- Years active: 1950 - 1956 (film)

Josefin Kipper (1928–1981) was an Austrian actress. She starred in Conchita and the Engineer (1954).

== Selected filmography ==
- The Lady in Black (1951)
- The White Adventure (1952)
- Homesick for You (1952)
- The Mine Foreman (1952)
- Such a Charade (1953)
- The Silent Angel (1954)
- Rose-Girl Resli (1954)
- Conchita and the Engineer (1954)
- Son Without a Home (1955)
- Where the Ancient Forests Rustle (1956)

== Bibliography ==
- Goble, Alan. The Complete Index to Literary Sources in Film. Walter de Gruyter, 1999.
