= The Mine Foreman (operetta) =

Operetta composed by Carl Zeller

The Mine Foreman (German: Der Obersteiger) is an operetta composed by Carl Zeller with a libretto by Ludwig Held and Moritz West. It premiered on 5 January 1894 at the Theater an der Wien in Vienna. In 1952 the libretto served as the basis for a film The Mine Foreman. The operetta is rarely performed today, but the aria “Sei nicht bös” (“Don’t be cross”) has become a concert staple.

== Bibliography ==
- Robert Dassanowsky. Austrian Cinema: A History. McFarland, 2005.
