= Katharina Mayberg =

German actress

- Born: 31 March 1925; Hamburg, Germany
- Died: 21 February 2007 (aged 81); Hamburg, Germany
- Occupation: Actress
- Years active: 1948–1987 (film & TV)

Katharina Mayberg (1925–2007) was a German film and television actress.

== Partial filmography ==
- Gaspary's Sons (1948)
- The Murder Trial of Doctor Jordan (1949)
- The Marriage of Figaro (1949) - Barbarina
- Theodore the Goalkeeper (1950) - Carola
- Immortal Light (1951) - Perrins Tochter
- The Blue Star of the South (1951) - Nelitze
- Behind Monastery Walls (1952) - Kathrin
- Marriage for One Night (1953) - Anita
- Arena of Death (1953) - Manuela Moreno
- The Country Schoolmaster (1954) - Martha Detleffsen
- The Sweetest Fruits (1954) - Juanita
- Rose-Girl Resli (1954) - Christine Rohrbach
- The Beautiful Miller (1954) - Kat Dramberger
- They Were So Young (1954) - Felicia
- The Inn on the Lahn (1955) - Josefine, Kellnerin
- Klisura (1956) - Ajka
- The First Day of Spring (1956) - Bettina Morelli
- The Battalion in the Shadows (1957) - Carmen
- Mazurka der Liebe (1957) - Bronislawa
- The Dragon's Blood (1957) - Brunilde
- Doctor Crippen Lives (1958) - Maja, malaisische Studentin
- Immer die Radfahrer (1958) - 'Kätzchen' Beryl
- I'm Marrying the Director (1960) - Silvia Roscol
- Im Namen einer Mutter (1960) - Emmi, Strafgefangene
- Il carro armato dell'8 settembre (1960)
- Kauf dir einen bunten Luftballon (1961) - Ilona Berg
- Junge Leute brauchen Liebe (1961) - Fatme
- Man in the Shadows (1961) - Vera Valentin
- Auf Wiedersehen am blauen Meer (1962) - Frau Aldobandini
- Durchbruch Lok 234 (1963) - Frau Mielke
- Wilder Sex junger Mädchen (1972)
- The Rider on the White Horse (1978) - Magd Ann Grete

== Bibliography ==
- Fritsche, Maria (2013). Homemade Men in Postwar Austrian Cinema: Nationhood, Genre and Masculinity. New York: Berghahn Books. ISBN 978-0-85745-946-6.
