= Open Your Window (film) =

1953 film by Anton Kutter

- Directed by: Anton Kutter
- Written by: Anton Kutter
- Starring: Peter Pasetti; Elisabeth Stemberger; Gunther Philipp
- Music by: Herbert Jarczyk
- Production companies: Bergland-Film; Süddeutsche Filmproduktion
- Distributed by: Kopp-Filmverleih
- Release date: 22 October 1953
- Running time: 105 minutes
- Countries: Austria; West Germany
- Language: German

Open Your Window (German: Geh mach dein Fensterl auf) is a 1953 Austrian-German musical comedy film directed by Anton Kutter and starring Peter Pasetti, Elisabeth Stemberger and Gunther Philipp.

It was made as a co-production between a company based in Linz and one in Munich. The film's sets were designed by the art director Sepp Rothauer.

== Cast ==
- Peter Pasetti
- Elisabeth Stemberger
- Gunther Philipp
- Ilse Peternell
- Hans Olden
- Gustl Gstettenbaur
- Karl Skraup
- Joachim Fuchsberger

== Bibliography ==
- Robert von Dassanowsky. Austrian Cinema: A History. McFarland, 2005.
