= Sybil Werden =

German dancer and actress (1924–2007)

Sybil Werden (3 September 1924 – 27 July 2007) was a German dancer and actress during the 1950s.

== Life and career ==
Born on 3 September 1924, Sybil Barbara Astrid Werden was the daughter of jewish actress Margit Barnay and architect Hans Schmidt-Werden. Following training with Tatjana Gsovsky, she began her career as a dance soloist in 1946 at the Berlin State Opera, and then made her film debut in Das Letzte Rezept (The Last Recipe) in 1952. Married to fellow German actor Harald Juhnke (1929–2005) during the early part of that same decade, she and her husband welcomed the birth of daughter, Barbara, in 1953. Their daughter died two years later. After her son, Peter, was born in 1956, she retired from acting. She and her husband then divorced in 1962.

Werden was preceded by her ex-husband in death, in 2005, from dementia-related complications. She then died in Munich, Germany on 27 July 2007, and was buried at the Cemetery Dahlem.

== Selected filmography ==
- Desires (1952)
- Street Serenade (1953)
- The Bird Seller (1953)
- On the Reeperbahn at Half Past Midnight (1954)
- Wenn der Vater mit dem Sohne (1955)
- Reaching for the Stars (1955)
