= Lady's Choice (film) =

1953 film

- German film poster
- Directed by: E. W. Emo
- Written by: Heinz Bruck; Gustav Kampendonk
- Produced by: Werner Ludwig; Hermann Schwerin
- Starring: Georg Thomalla; Grethe Weiser; Willy Fritsch
- Cinematography: Bruno Timm
- Edited by: Hermann Leitner
- Music by: Heino Gaze
- Production company: Fono Film
- Distributed by: Gloria Film
- Release date: 21 August 1953
- Running time: 95 minutes
- Country: West Germany
- Language: German

Lady's Choice (German: Damenwahl) is a 1953 West German comedy film directed by E. W. Emo and starring Georg Thomalla, Grethe Weiser, and Willy Fritsch. The title is a traditional German dancing term for a dance where the female gets to choose their male partners.

It was shot at the Spandau Studios in Berlin. The film's sets were designed by the art director Rolf Zehetbauer.

== Cast ==
- Georg Thomalla as Max
- Grethe Weiser as Mathilde Kratzer
- Willy Fritsch as Herbert Blank
- Ingrid Pan as Marion
- Oskar Sima as Luchs
- Rudolf Platte as von Latten
- Carsta Löck as Frau Musonk
- Else Reval as Frau Brummer
- Jakob Tiedtke as Kapitän
- Ewald Wenck as Gresslich
- Oscar Sabo as Angler
- Ruth Peter as Emma
- Gerty Godden as Grete
- Ruth Stephan
- Ninowka
- Franz-Otto Krüger
- Lieselotte Walther
- Edhilt Rochell
