= C.W. Fernbach =

Austrian actor (1915–1967)

- Born: 18 April 1915; Bruck a.d. Leitha, Austro-Hungarian Empire
- Died: 30 November 1967 (aged 52); Vienna, Austria
- Other name: Carl Wilhelm Fernbach
- Occupation: Actor
- Years active: 1936-1967 (film)

C.W. Fernbach (1915–1967) was an Austrian actor. He was married to the actress Dany Sigel.

== Selected filmography ==
- The Immortal Face (1947)
- Crown Prince Rudolph's Last Love (1955)
- Espionage (1955)
- The Congress Dances (1955)
- Emperor's Ball (1956)
- Love, Girls and Soldiers (1958)
- Crime Tango (1960)
- The Adventures of Count Bobby (1961)
- The Sweet Life of Count Bobby (1962)
- The Great Happiness (1967)
