= Street Serenade =

1953 film

- Ellinor Jensen, Otto Gebühr and Vico Torriani
- German: Straßenserenade
- Directed by: Werner Jacobs
- Written by: Helmut Weiss
- Produced by: Willy Zeyn
- Starring: Vico Torriani; Sybil Werden; Otto Gebühr
- Cinematography: Erich Claunigk
- Edited by: Luise Dreyer-Sachsenberg
- Music by: Benny de Weill; Hans Lang; Willy Mattes
- Production companies: Neue Emelka; Willy Zeyn-Film
- Distributed by: Neue Filmverleih
- Release date: 24 November 1953
- Running time: 87 minutes
- Country: West Germany
- Language: German

Street Serenade (German: Straßenserenade) is a 1953 West German musical comedy film directed by Werner Jacobs and starring Vico Torriani, Sybil Werden and Otto Gebühr.

It was made at the Bavaria Studios in Munich. The film's sets were designed by the art directors Franz Bi and Bruno Monden.

== Plot ==
In Naples a famous singer struggling with voice problems hires a struggling street singer to make records in his place.

== Cast ==
- Vico Torriani as Mario Monti
- Sybil Werden as Wanda Siria
- Ellinor Jensen as Nina
- Hans Reiser as Luigi
- Charles Régnier as Sachetti
- Otto Gebühr as Professor Teofilo Sandora
- Rolf Wanka as Gino Ferro
- Paul Heidemann as Fabio
- Maria Sebaldt as Carmela
- Walter Janssen as Bartoli
