= Dark Clouds Over the Dachstein =

1953 film by Anton Kutter

- Pero Alexander and Gisela Fackeldey
- Directed by: Anton Kutter
- Written by: Elmira Koref (play); Anton Kutter
- Produced by: Kurt Hammer
- Starring: Gisela Fackeldey; Eduard Köck; Marianne Koch
- Cinematography: Josef Kirzeder; Gustav Weiß
- Edited by: Anton Kutter
- Music by: Herbert Jarczyk
- Production companies: Süddeutsche Filmproduktion; Telosfilm
- Distributed by: Kopp-Filmverleih
- Release date: 20 March 1953
- Running time: 107 minutes
- Countries: Austria; West Germany
- Language: German

Dark Clouds Over the Dachstein (German: Wetterleuchten am Dachstein) is a 1953 Austrian-German drama film directed by Anton Kutter and starring Gisela Fackeldey, Eduard Köck and Marianne Koch.

== Cast ==
- Gisela Fackeldey as Jutta, die Herrin vom Salzerhof
- Eduard Köck as Schäfer, genannt 'Tiroler'
- Marianne Koch as Christl, die junge Magd
- Pero Alexander as Hannes Khäls von Khälsberg, Großknecht
- Joseph Egger
- Jutta Bornemann as Cilly, Hausmagd
- Hans Brand
- Hans Hais
- Etta Werner
- Otto Glaser
- Harry Kupetz
- Hans Loitzl as Peter
- Lucia Maierl
- Margarethe Jandl
- Oskar Hillbrand
- Lothar Burmester

== Bibliography ==
- Fritsche, Maria. Homemade Men in Postwar Austrian Cinema: Nationhood, Genre and Masculinity. Berghahn Books, 2013.
