= Willy Hagara =

Willy Hagara (4 June 1927 – 15 May 2015) was an Austrian schlager pop singer and actor.

Born in Vienna, he worked for the Austrian postal service before winning a talent competition in the Vienna Konzerthaus in 1946. Credited at the time as "the best jazz singer in Vienna", he took singing and acting lessons and began a career as a popular baritone singer and entertainer. His song "Casetta in Canada" reached number 3 on the German pop chart in 1958. He made numerous television appearances, and appeared in popular West German films such as Weißer Holunder, Der Haus-Tyrann, and Paprika.

He largely gave up his career in entertainment in the late 1960s after the deaths of both his wife and father, from whom he received a large inheritance. He lived quietly in retirement, and made his final public appearance in 2002. He died in 2015, aged 87.
