= Robert Freitag =

Swiss-Austrian actor

Robert Peter Freytag (7 April 1916 in Vienna – 8 July 2010 in Munich), known professionally as Robert Freitag, was an Austrian-Swiss stage and screen actor and film director.

== Life ==
Freitag was the son of the Swiss opera singer Otto Freitag (Otto Freytag). He was trained as an actor at the Max Reinhardt Seminar in Vienna. During the Nazi era, he went to Switzerland, where he was active as an actor at the Schauspielhaus Zürich (Zurich playhouse). In 1945, he married the German actress Maria Becker, who had studied acting in Vienna and who since had been at the Schauspielhaus Zürich, which had benefitted from the presence of German émigrés during the Second World War. Becker became a Swiss citizen by marrying Freitag.

In 1949, Freitag began participating in the Salzburg Festival. Later he performed, among other places, at the Deutsches Schauspielhaus and the Hamburger Kammerspiele, both in Hamburg.

With his wife Maria Becker and the German stage actor Will Quadflieg, he founded the Zürcher Schauspieltruppe in 1956 in Zurich, where he was also a part-time administrator. That troupe performed throughout the German-speaking countries and in the United States.

On stage, he played many classical and modern roles. Beginning in 1941, he appeared in films— in particular in the starring role in William Tell. Later, he often appeared on television.

Freitag and Maria Becker were divorced in 1966, but they continued to work together, especially in the travelling theatre company Schauspieltruppe Zürich that they had founded. They had three sons, two of whom—Benedict Freitag and Oliver Tobias—became actors.

In 1994, Freitag's autobiography, Es wollt mir behagen, mit Lachen die Wahrheit zu sagen was published by Pendo Verlag.

In 2001, at the age of 85, he had a role in the made-for-TV film Die Liebenden vom Alexanderplatz (The Alexanderplatz Lovers), directed by Detlef Rönfeldt.

Freitag's second marriage, to the German actress Maria Sebaldt, lasted from 1966 until his death. They lived in Grünwald, Bavaria. They had a daughter.

== Filmography ==
Year	Title	Role	Notes
1941	Love is Duty Free	Swiss customs officer	
1941	Bieder der Flieger	Oskar Bider	
1943	Wilder Urlaub	Sergeant Epper	
1948	Die Frau am Weg	the fugitive	
1949	White Gold	Andreas	
1950	Es liegt was in der Luft		
1951	Decision Before Dawn	Sgt. Paul Richter	
1953	The Village Under the Sky	Dr. Michael Ellert	
1954	A Woman of Today	Aldo Mattei	
1954	Circus of Love	Richards	
1954	Conchita and the Engineer	Cyll Farney	
1954	The Silent Angel	Robert	
1954	Dear Miss Doctor	Father Anselmus	
1955	I Know What I'm Living For	Peter Neumann, mechanic	
1955	The Plot to Assassinate Hitler	Captain Lindner	
1955	Magic Fire	August Roeckel	
1955	Wenn der Vater mit dem Sohne	Roy Bentley	
1955	Escape to the Dolomites	Sergio	
1956	The First Day of Spring	Bruno	
1956	Der Meineidbauer	first border policeman	
1956	Von der Liebe besiegt (Schicksal am Matterhorn)	Beni Kronig – mountain guide	
1957	The Big Chance	Chaplain Sommer	
1958	Resurrection	Simonson	
1959	SOS – Gletscherpilot	Engineer Gisler	
1961	William Tell	William Tell	
1961	The Last Chapter	Lawyer Robertsen	
1962	The Longest Day	Meyer's Aide	Uncredited
1963	The Great Escape	Captain Posen	
1969	The Age of the Fish	Caesar	TV film
1976	Néa	Benito	
1976	Riedland		
1981	Berlin Tunnel 21	Dr. Lentz	
1984	Bluebeard		TV film
1985	Wild Geese II	Stroebling	
1985	A Crime of Honour a.k.a. A Song for Europe	Moser	TV film
2001	Die Liebenden vom Alexanderplatz	Max	(final film role)
