= Ilse Peternell =

Austrian actress (1928–2011)

- Born: 2 December 1928; Götzis, Vorarlberg, Austria
- Died: 30 April 2011 (aged 82)
- Occupation: Actress
- Years active: 1947–2011

Ilse Peternell (2 December 1928 – 30 April 2011) was an Austrian actress who appeared in more than forty films during her career. During the 1940s and 1950 she played female leads in films such as Winter Melody (1947). She gradually switched to supporting and character roles.

Peternell died on 30 April 2011, at the age of 82.

== Selected filmography ==
- Winter Melody (1947)
- Ideal Woman Sought (1952)
- Open Your Window (1953)
- The Emperor Waltz (1953)
- Roses from the South (1954)
- The Congress Dances (1955)
- Emperor's Ball (1956)
- Love, Girls and Soldiers (1958)
- Our Crazy Aunts (1961)
- Our Crazy Aunts in the South Seas (1964)
- The Priest of St. Pauli (1970)
- When You're With Me (1970)

== Bibliography ==
- Fritsche, Maria. Homemade Men in Postwar Austrian Cinema: Nationhood, Genre and Masculinity. Berghahn Books, 2013.
