= Der Vogelhändler =

Operetta by Carl Zeller

Der Vogelhändler (The Bird Seller) is an operetta in three acts by Carl Zeller with a libretto by Moritz West and Ludwig Held based on Victor Varin's and de Biéville's Ce que deviennent les roses (1857). In 1891, Helen Tretbar translated the original German libretto into English and adapted it for performance in America as The Tyrolean.

== Performance history ==
Der Vogelhandler was first performed on 10 January 1891 at the Theater an der Wien in Vienna with the celebrated Viennese actor and singer, Alexander Girardi, in the title role. It also played at the Theatre Royal, Drury Lane in London in 1895 and, as The Tyrolean, at the Casino Theatre in New York in 1891 for 100 performances.

The act 2 aria "Wie mein Ahn'l zwanzig Jahr" was recorded by the soprano Elisabeth Schumann.

== Roles ==
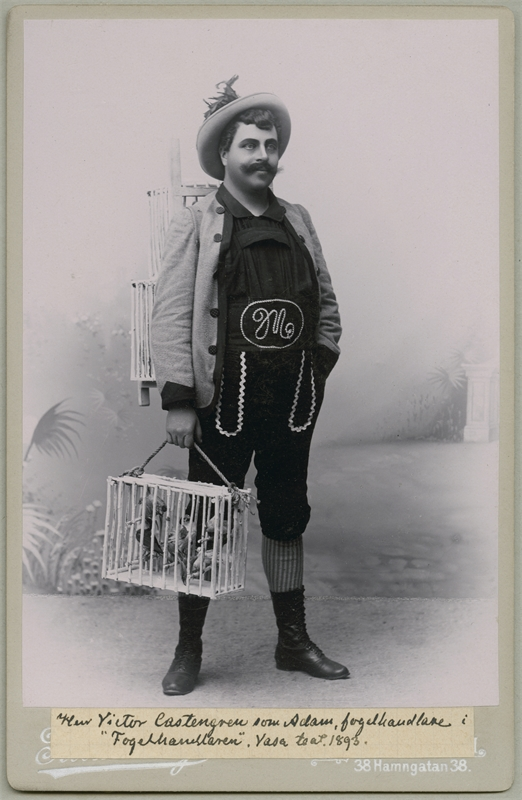
Victor Castegren in 1893 as The Birdseller

Roles, voice types, premiere cast
Role	Voice type	Premiere cast, 10 January 1891
Adam, a birdseller from the Tyrol	tenor/baritone	Alexander Girardi
Christel (short for Christine), the post mistress	soprano	Ilka Pálmay
Electress Marie	soprano	Ottilie Collin
Baroness Adelaide, lady at Court		
Countess Mimi, lady at Court		
Baron Weps, master of the hunt	tenor	Sebastian Stelzer
Count Stanislaus, his nephew, a guards officer	tenor	Rudolf del Zopp
Süffle, professor	tenor	
Würmchen, professor	baritone	Hans Pokorny
Schneck, the village mayor	tenor	
Frau Nebel, the inn landlady		
Jette, a waitress		
Tyroleans, people of the Pfalz, country folk, society people

== Synopsis ==
The setting is historical fiction with artistic license, in 18th century lands around Heidelberg, which then constituted a district of the Holy Roman Empire governed by a Prince known as the Elector Palatine. The story is reset in a fictitious estate of the husband of the Electress, Princess Marie.

Der Vogelhändler is a bucolic comedy, set in the 18th-century Rhineland, featuring two lovers, Adam, a handsome bird seller from the Tyrol and Christel, the village postmistress. They, at cross-purposes, become involved in romantic complications at the Court of the reigning Prince. After a number of intrigues and misunderstandings, all ends happily.

The story is also a tale of people from different cultures and backgrounds learning to live together. The bird-seller comes from a culture quite different from that of the postal clerk. The ending, in which the Court joins the Tyroleans in dancing the Laendler and the bird seller greets his new neighbors in Tyrolean dialect, represents a triumph of cross-cultural integration and friendship.

=== Act 1 ===
The mayor is at his wit's end because he cannot supply the Elector with the wild boar and the ceremonial maiden required to perform during an upcoming festival. A waitress suggests that Christel, the postal clerk, might be willing to volunteer to be the ceremonial maiden because she is promised to Adam, a bird-seller from the Tyrol, who cannot afford to move into her community to forward their engagement. Wishing to please Christel, Adam offers Weps a yellow adult bird from the Tyrol as a bribe toward being considered for an in-town work assignment. Meanwhile, Stanislaus, a guards officer, is attempting to get out of debt. When the master of the hunt finds out that the Elector will not be coming to the festival, he is greedy for the purse which the Elector has sent to use as an honorarium to pay the ceremonial maiden. Stanislaus suggests that he impersonate the Elector.

Electress-Princess Marie arrives in disguise with Adelaide because she believes that the Elector is coming to the festival for no other reason than to be alone with the ceremonial maiden. Christel tells Adam that she plans to petition the Court to find him employment so that he can move here to forward their engagement. Adam, believing that a Tyrolean man bears the sole responsibility to fight his own fight to be able to support the wife he has chosen, asks her not to do this. Christel ends up in the pavilion with Stanislaus, believing him to be the Elector. Adam arrives at the festival to find the master of the hunt and the mayor informing him that Christel is the ceremonial maiden and is therefore not in the crowd. Marie, hoping to save Adam from embarrassment, offers him the bouquet of roses which she has brought in case her plan to become the ceremonial maiden, thus catching her husband, inflagrante, works out. Adam, thinking of his own Tyrolen behavior code, somehow believes himself to have been promised to Marie and Christel to have been promised to the Elector. He publicly breaks off his engagement to Christel.

=== Act 2 ===
The master of the hunt, who is Stanislaus' uncle, wonders about a scandal about to break because Adam and Christel have arrived at the Palace at cross-purposes, while Stanislaus may still be impersonating the Elector. Christel manages to get permission from Marie to find Adam a job at Court. An examination is arranged for Adam's job interview, conducted by two comical professors. Adelaide asks the master of the hunt to arrange a marriage between herself and Stanislaus, whom she adores, Stanislaus, still pretending to be the Elector, continues to pursue Christel, who complains to Marie. Marie works out a scheme with Adam and Christel to identify the unknown individual who is still impersonating the Elector. She invites Adam to bring his Tyrolean friends to entertain at Court. Under the guise of proposing a toast, Adam manages to get around to all concerned to inform them that Christel will ring a small bell when she identifies the unknown individual who may still be impersonating the Elector.

When the master of the hunt announces the wedding of Adelaide and Stanislaus, Christel identifies Stanislaus as the impostor. When Marie chides Stanisslaus for behavior unbecoming an officer and chooses Adam as the person to pass judgement because Adam was the one who suffered most because of his prank, Adam announces to the Court that he believes Stanislaus to have already made a legitimate offer of marriage to Christel. Stanislaus answers him in gentlemanly fashion by formally proposing to Christel. When Christel tells Adam that she is still promised only to him, Adam again formally rejects her, so Christel decides to accept Stanislaus' proposal. Adelaide, still unsure why there was an objection to her marriage because her groom had already promised himself to another, collapses.

=== Act 3 ===
The master of the hunt, who has always adored Adelaide, sets things right by proposing to her and encouraging her to accept. Christel confronts Stanislaus and convinces both Adam and Stanislaus that women always have the upper hand in matters of love. Marie wonders why those below her in rank are finding true happiness while she can only fantasize about her own happiness.

In a warmth of cross-cultural friendship and understanding, the Tyroleans encourage the aristocrats of the Court to dance with them at the union of Adam and Christel while Adam extends to his new neighbors a warm greeting in his own Tyrolean dialect.

== Adaptations ==
The work was adapted several times into films, e.g. in 1935, in 1953, and in 1962. The 1956 film Die Christel von der Post only takes its name from this operetta's main female role, and the 1940 film Roses in Tyrol is loosely inspired by this operetta.
