= Hannelore Bollmann =

German actress (1925–2023)

- Born: 10 May 1925; Hamburg, Germany
- Died: 7 April 2023 (aged 97); Santa Barbara, California, U.S.
- Occupation: Actress
- Years active: 1947–1962 (film)

Hannelore Bollmann (10 May 1925 – 7 April 2023) was a German actress. She appeared in more than thirty films, often in leading roles.

Bollmann died in Santa Barbara, California on 7 April 2023, at the age of 97.

== Selected filmography ==
- King of Hearts (1947)
- Hello, Fraulein! (1949)
- Love on Ice (1950)
- Czardas of Hearts (1951)
- Holiday From Myself (1952)
- Carnival in White (1952)
- On the Green Meadow (1953)
- Marriage for One Night (1953)
- The Sweetest Fruits (1954)
- The Big Star Parade (1954)
- Roses from the South (1954)
- The Congress Dances (1955)
- Espionage (1955)
- The Happy Village (1955)
- Emperor's Ball (1956)
- All the Sins of the Earth (1958)
- Our Crazy Aunts (1961)
- Two Bavarians in Bonn (1962)
- Congress of Love (1966)

== Bibliography ==
- Goble, Alan (1999). The Complete Index to Literary Sources in Film. Berlin: Walter de Gruyter. ISBN 978-3-11-095194-3.
