= Ludwig Held =

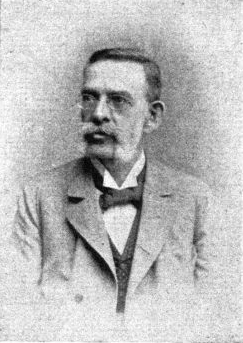
Portrait in Wiener Bilder, 25 February 1900

Ludwig Held (14 April 1837 – 2 March 1900), resident in Vienna from the 1860s, was a theatre critic and librettist, writing libretti for operettas by Carl Zeller and Franz von Suppé.

== Life ==
Held, born in Regensburg, lived in Vienna from the 1860s, where he was secretary of the Theater an der Wien, at that time under the management of Maximilian Steiner. In 1873 he became theatre critic for Neues Wiener Tagblatt.

Held wrote popular farces, and song lyrics for famous actresses including Josefine Gallmeyer and Marie Geistinger. He collaborated with Moritz West to write libretti for operettas by Carl Zeller, including Der Vogelhändler and The Mine Foreman; with Viktor Léon he wrote libretti for operettas by Franz von Suppé.

He continued as a theatre critic until his death in Vienna in 1900.

== Family ==
He married in 1870 Adele Ehn (1843–1880); they had four sons, including Hugo Held (1872–1936), an actor and writer, and Leo Held (1874–1903), a conductor and composer.
