= Moritz West =

Austrian businessman and librettist (1840-1904)

Moritz West (6 August 1840 – 11 July 1904) was an Austrian businessman and librettist, writing libretti for operettas by Carl Zeller and Franz von Suppé.

== Life ==
West was born in Vienna, and studied law at the University of Vienna from 1858 to 1862. Meanwhile, he was interested in writing dramas, and his early work gained approval from Franz Grillparzer and Eduard von Bauernfeld.

He was appointed secretary of the Union Bank of Vienna, and from 1874 to 1878 he was a director of the Olomouc-Jägerndorf Railway. Because of ill health he discontinued his business commitments, and spent some time in Italy. Richard Genée encouraged him to take up writing.

He collaborated with Ludwig Held to write libretti for operettas by Carl Zeller, including Der Vogelhändler and The Mine Foreman. He also worked for the composers Richard Genée, Johann Brandl and Franz von Suppé.

West died in 1904, in Aigen im Mühlkreis in Upper Austria.
