= Carl Zeller =

Austrian composer

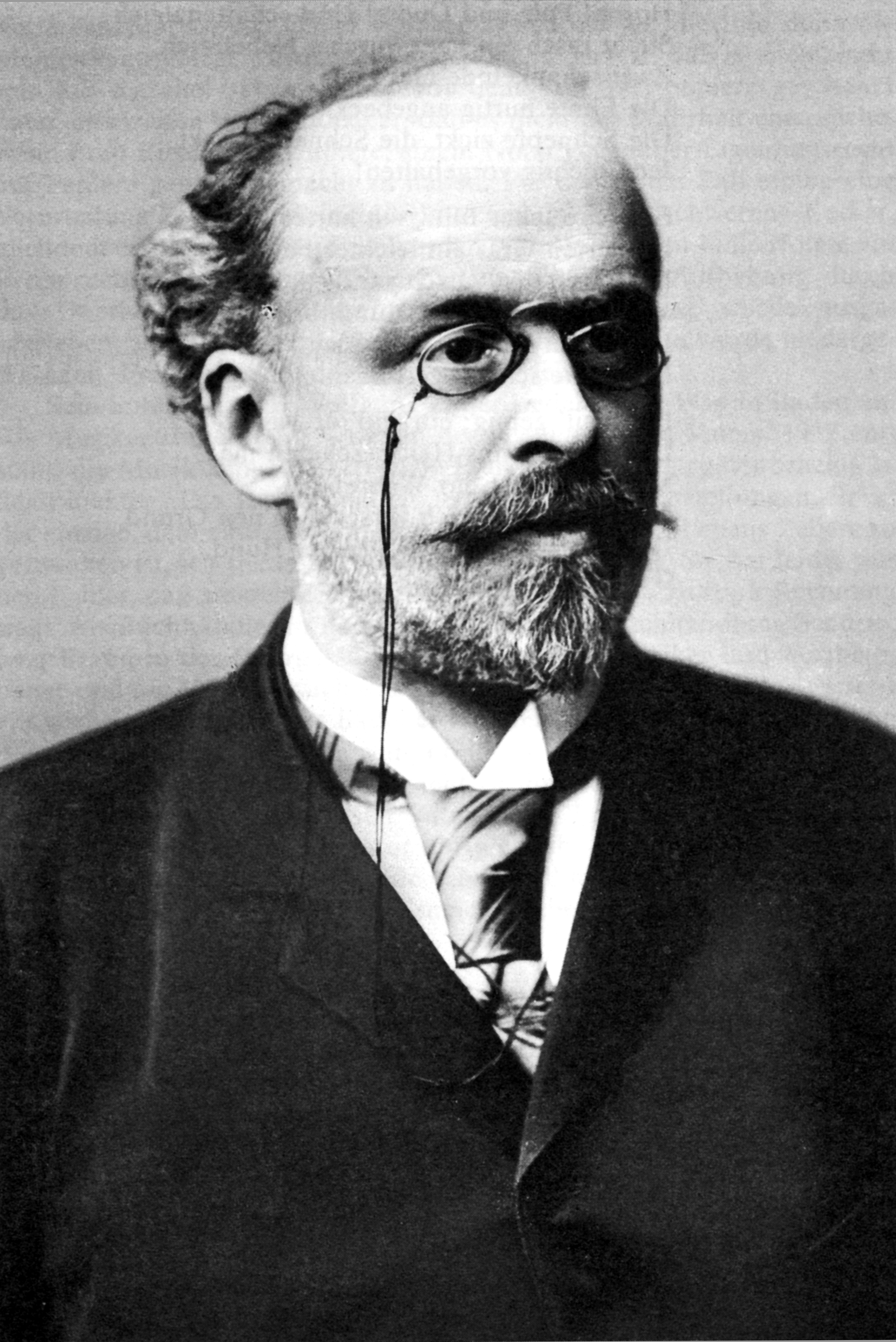
Carl Zeller

Carl Adam Johann Nepomuk Zeller (19 June 1842 – 17 August 1898) was an Austrian composer of operettas.

Zeller was born in Sankt Peter in der Au, the only child of physician Johann Zeller and Maria Anna Elizabeth. Zeller's father died before his first birthday, after which his mother remarried Ernest Friedinger. In 1875, Zeller married Anna Maria Schwetz.

Zeller had a fine soprano voice, and sang in the Vienna Boys' Choir before studying and composition in the University of Vienna. He worked as a civil servant at the Imperial Ministry of Education while composing choral works and a number of operettas, the best-known of which is Der Vogelhändler. All of his librettos were written (or co-written) by Moritz West, often together with Ludwig Held.

Legal troubles, including a perjury conviction, ended Zeller's career at the ministry and led to prison and public disgrace in the mid-1890s (although his prison sentence was later repealed). After an injury in 1895 from falling on the ice, he spent his last years physically and then mentally ill. Zeller died of pneumonia in Baden bei Wien at the age of 56.

== Operettas ==
- Joconde (1876)
- Die Fornarina (1878)
- Capitän Nicoll, oder Die Carbonari (1880)
- Der Vagabund (1886)
- Der Vogelhändler (The Bird Seller) (1891)
- The Mine Foreman (Der Obersteiger) (1894)
- Der Kellermeister (1901; completed by Johannes Brandl)
