= Johanna Sibelius =

German screenwriter

- Born: 10 February 1913; Berlin, German Empire
- Died: 8 March 1970 (aged 57)
- Other name: Sibylle Freybe
- Occupation: Screenwriter
- Years active: 1939-1969 (film)

Johanna Sibelius (10 February 1913 – 8 March 1970) was a German screenwriter.

Her sisters were the actress Jutta Freybe and the writer Martha Albrand.

== Selected filmography ==
- Congo Express (dir. Eduard von Borsody, 1939) — based on her own novel
- Der dunkle Punkt (dir. Georg Zoch, 1940)
- Wenn du noch eine Heimat hast (dir. Günther Rittau, 1942) — based on the play Der Strom by Max Halbe
- My Friend Josephine (dir. Hans H. Zerlett, 1942)
- Nacht ohne Abschied (dir. Erich Waschneck, 1943)
- Am Abend nach der Oper (dir. Arthur Maria Rabenalt, 1945) — based on the novella Der Fund by Franz Nabl
- Five Suspects (dir. Kurt Hoffmann, 1950) — based on the novel Thomsen verhört die Prima by Herbert Moll
- Heart's Desire (dir. Paul Martin, 1951) — based on the novel D-Zug 517 by Maria von Peteani
- Captive Soul (dir. Hans Wolff, 1952)
- Klettermaxe (dir. Kurt Hoffmann, 1952) — based on the eponymous novel by Hans Mahner-Mons
- Until We Meet Again (dir. Gustav Ucicky, 1952)
- Dreaming Lips (dir. Josef von Báky, 1953) — remake of the 1932 film Dreaming Lips, based on the play Mélo by Henri Bernstein
- Music by Night (dir. Kurt Hoffmann, 1953)
- Mailman Mueller (dir. John Reinhardt, 1953)
- When the White Lilacs Bloom Again (dir. Hans Deppe, 1953)
- Men at a Dangerous Age (dir. Carl-Heinz Schroth, 1954)
- The Seven Dresses of Katrin (dir. Hans Deppe, 1954) — based on the eponymous novel by Gisi Gruber
- Love is Forever (dir. Wolfgang Liebeneiner, 1954) — based on the play Fires of St. John by Hermann Sudermann
- Sacred Lie (dir. Wolfgang Liebeneiner, 1955)
- I Was an Ugly Girl (dir. Wolfgang Liebeneiner, 1955) — based on the eponymous novel by Annemarie Selinko
- My Leopold (dir. Géza von Bolváry, 1955) — based on the play My Leopold by Adolphe L'Arronge
- My Husband's Getting Married Today (dir. Kurt Hoffmann, 1956) — based on the eponymous novel by Annemarie Selinko
- Vater, unser bestes Stück (dir. Günther Lüders, 1957) — based on the eponymous novel by Hans Nicklisch
- Scandal in Bad Ischl (dir. Rolf Thiele, 1957) — based on the play The Master by Hermann Bahr
- Meine schöne Mama (dir. Paul Martin, 1958) — based on the eponymous novel by Mathilde Walewska
- Arms and the Man (dir. Franz Peter Wirth, 1958) — based on the play Arms and the Man by George Bernard Shaw
- Rendezvous in Vienna (dir. Helmut Weiss, 1959) — based on the play Rendezvous in Wien by Fritz Eckhardt
- Jacqueline (dir. Wolfgang Liebeneiner, 1959)
- Mrs. Warren's Profession (dir. Ákos Ráthonyi, 1960) — based on the play Mrs. Warren's Profession by George Bernard Shaw
- Der Traum des Mr. Borton (dir. Anton Schelkopf, 1960, TV film)
- Stefanie in Rio (dir. Curtis Bernhardt, 1960) — sequel to the film Stefanie, based on the novel Stefanie oder Die liebenswerten Torheiten by Gitta von Cetto
- Geständnis einer Sechzehnjährigen (dir. Georg Tressler, 1961) — based on the eponymous novel by Robert Pilchowski
- Zu jung für die Liebe? (dir. Erica Balqué, 1961)
- The Last of Mrs. Cheyney (dir. Franz Josef Wild, 1961) — based on the play The Last of Mrs. Cheyney by Frederick Lonsdale
- Adorable Julia (dir. Alfred Weidenmann, 1962) — based on the novel Theatre by W. Somerset Maugham
- Only a Woman (dir. Alfred Weidenmann, 1962)
- Mark of the Tortoise (1964) — based on the novel Mission To Siena by James Hadley Chase
- Condemned to Sin (dir. Alfred Weidenmann, 1964) — based on the novel The Fortress by Henry Jaeger
- Among Vultures (dir. Alfred Vohrer, 1964) — based on the eponymous book by Karl May
- Old Surehand (dir. Alfred Vohrer, 1965) — based on the eponymous novel by Karl May
- Hocuspocus (dir. Kurt Hoffmann, 1966) — based on the eponymous play by Curt Goetz
- Long Legs, Long Fingers (dir. Alfred Vohrer, 1966)
- Liselotte of the Palatinate (dir. Kurt Hoffmann, 1966)
- The Heathens of Kummerow (dir. Werner Jacobs, 1967) — based on the eponymous novel by Ehm Welk
- 24 Hours in the Life of a Woman (dir. Dominique Delouche, 1968) — based on the novella Twenty-Four Hours in the Life of a Woman by Stefan Zweig
- Morning's at Seven (dir. Kurt Hoffmann, 1968) — based on the eponymous novel by Eric Malpass
- Heintje: A Heart Goes on a Journey (dir. Werner Jacobs, 1969)
- When Sweet Moonlight Is Sleeping in the Hills (dir. Wolfgang Liebeneiner, 1969) — based on the eponymous novel by Eric Malpass

== Bibliography ==
- Bergfelder, Tim. International Adventures: German Popular Cinema and European Co-Productions in the 1960s. Berhahn Books,
