= Sacred Lie =

1955 film

- Directed by: Wolfgang Liebeneiner
- Written by: Eberhard Keindorff; Johanna Sibelius
- Starring: Ulla Jacobsson; Karlheinz Böhm; Erwin Strahl
- Cinematography: Kurt Schulz
- Edited by: Hermann Leitner
- Music by: Herbert Trantow
- Production company: Berolina Film
- Distributed by: Constantin Film
- Release date: 7 April 1955
- Running time: 102 minutes
- Country: West Germany
- Language: German

Sacred Lie (German: Die heilige Lüge) is a 1955 West German drama film directed by Wolfgang Liebeneiner and starring Ulla Jacobsson, Karlheinz Böhm and Erwin Strahl. It was shot at the Tempelhof Studios in Berlin. The film's sets were designed by the art directors Ernst Richter and Hans Ledersteger.

== Synopsis ==
A young woman from the country comes to work as a maid in a wealthy household. She develops a relationship with the unreliable son of the family who gets her pregnant. He reforms and they marry.

== Cast ==
- Ulla Jacobsson as Lena Larsen
- Karlheinz Böhm as Peter Weiland
- Erwin Strahl as Bo Larsen
- Hans Nielsen as Otto Weiland
- Lucie Englisch as Köchin Rosa
- Hans Quest as Paul Weiland
- Alice Treff as Ilse Weiland
- Wolfgang Neuss as Hermann
- Franca Parisi as Anita
- Liselotte Malkowsky as Singer
- Maria Sebaldt
- Fritz Tillmann
- Erich Arnold

== Bibliography ==
- Bock, Hans-Michael & Bergfelder, Tim. The Concise CineGraph. Encyclopedia of German Cinema. Berghahn Books, 2009.
