= When the White Lilacs Bloom Again (1953 film) =

- Directed by: Hans Deppe
- Written by: Fritz Rotter; Eberhard Keindorff; Johanna Sibelius
- Produced by: Kurt Ulrich
- Starring: Willy Fritsch; Magda Schneider; Romy Schneider
- Cinematography: Kurt Schulz
- Edited by: Walter Wischniewsky
- Music by: Franz Doelle
- Production company: Berolina Film
- Distributed by: Herzog Film
- Release date: 24 November 1953
- Running time: 95 minutes
- Country: West Germany
- Language: German

When the White Lilacs Bloom Again (German: Wenn der weiße Flieder wieder blüht) is a 1953 West German drama film directed by Hans Deppe and starring Willy Fritsch, Magda Schneider and Romy Schneider. It was shot at the Tempelhof Studios in West Berlin and on location around Wiesbaden in Hesse. The film's sets were designed by the art directors Alfred Bütow and Ernst Schomer.

It is one of the best known and most popular German films from the early 1950s. It is shown periodically on German television and still commands a wide audience.

== Plot ==
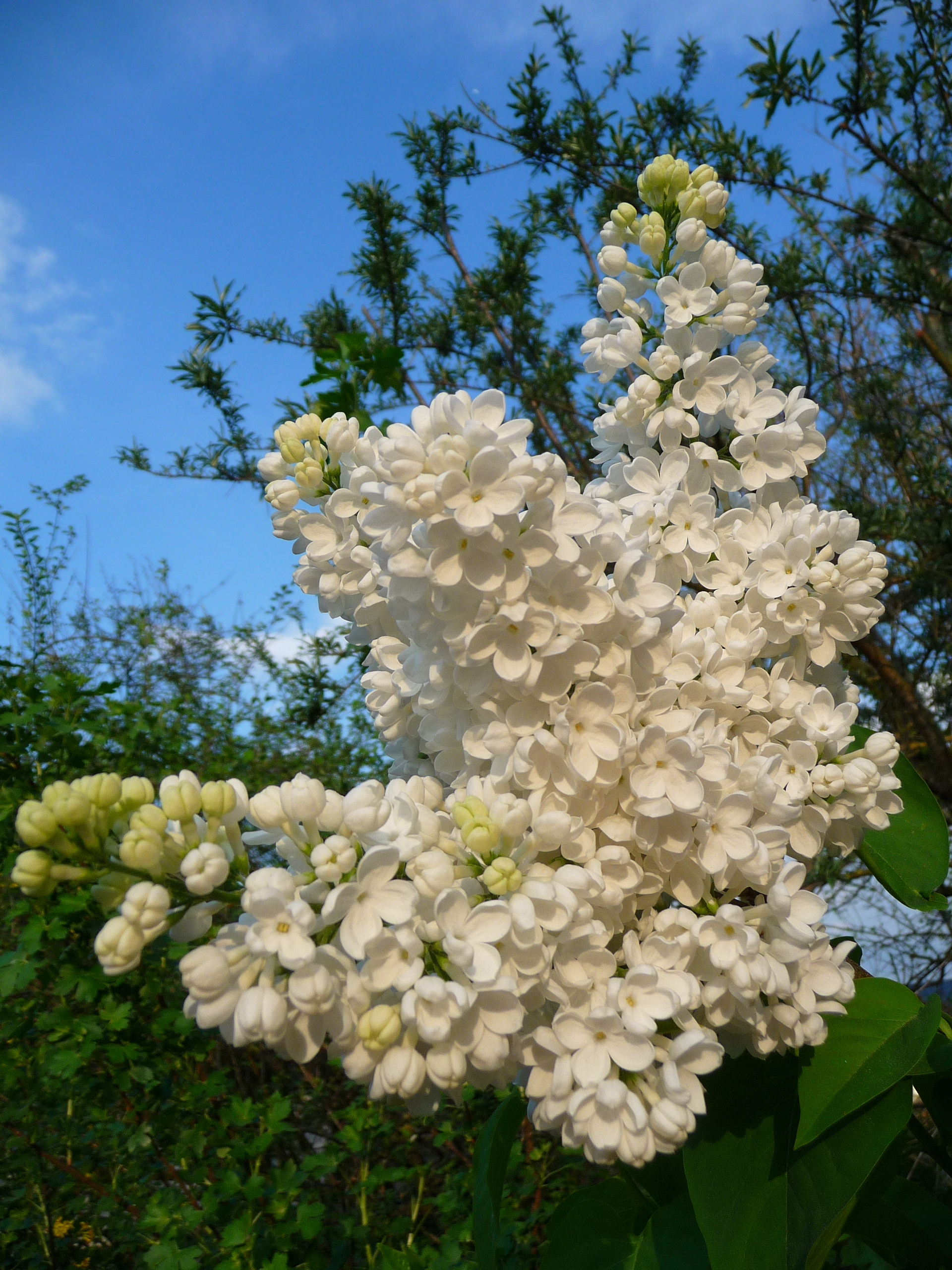
Blooming white lilacs

The marriage of struggling Wiesbaden ballad singer Willy Forster and seamstress Therese is plagued with constant financial difficulties. After a heated argument, Willy leaves Therese, unaware that she is pregnant. Thus, Therese becomes a single mother when Evie is born. She raises her daughter with the help of Willy's friend, Peter.

Fifteen years later, Willy, who now has an international career as a singer under his stage name, 'Bill Perry', returns to Wiesbaden as part of a European tour. He goes straight to see Therese, who does not mention that they have a daughter. However, Evie is a big fan of Bill Perry and she gets to know him anyway. Therese confides in Evie the truth about her father, and the girl later tells Willy that she is his daughter.

However, Willy's visit does not bring about the expected happy ending. Instead, Therese and Peter recognize that they are really meant for each other, and Willy comes to realize that his happiness does not lie with Therese, but rather with his longtime manager, Ellen.

The film ends at Frankfurt Airport with Peter, Therese and Evie there to see Willy and Ellen off. Willy promises his tearful daughter that he will be back to see her the following year.

== Background ==
In this film, pre-war German actors such as Willy Fritsch, Paul Klinger, Magda Schneider and Hertha Feiler appear alongside the children of other stars of that earlier era. Romy Schneider, the daughter of Magda Schneider and the Austrian actor, Wolf Albach-Retty, appears in her first film role together with Nina von Porembsky, the daughter of Alexa von Porembsky, as well as Götz George, the son of Heinrich George and Berta Drews.

The title song, "When the White Lilacs Bloom Again", was a popular hit in the 1920s for Franz Doelle.

Made in and around Wiesbaden, Wenn der weiße Flieder wieder blüht is one of the few so-called Heimatfilm pictures to have been set in the Hesse region as they were usually shot in the Alps, the Black Forest, or the Lüneburg Heath. Among the highlights are shots of the Wiesbaden old town.

== Cast ==
- Willy Fritsch as Willy Forster
- Magda Schneider as Therese Forster
- Romy Schneider as Evchen Forster
- Hertha Feiler as Ellen
- Paul Klinger as Peter Schroeder
- Albert Florath as Professor Mutzbauer
- Trude Wilke-Roßwog as Frau Möslein
- Götz George as Klaus
- Nina von Porembsky as Barbara
- Erika Block as Lieselotte
- Erna Haffner as Frau Kühn
- Liselotte Köster as Solotänzerin
- Jockl Stahl as Solotänzer
- Egon Kaiser as himself and his soloists

== Bibliography ==
- Robert Amos (ed.): Mythos Romy Schneider – Ich verleihe mich zum Träumen. Melzer Verlag, Neu Isenburg 2006, ISBN 3-939062-02-2
- Bock, Hans-Michael & Bergfelder, Tim. The Concise CineGraph. Encyclopedia of German Cinema. Berghahn Books, 2009.
