= Eric Malpass =

English novelist (1910–1996)

- Born: 14 November 1910; Derby, Derbyshire, England
- Died: 16 October 1996 (aged 85); Bishop's Waltham, Hampshire, England
- Occupation: Novelist
- Writing career
- Language: English
- Period: 1965–1986
- Notable work: Morning's at Seven

Eric Lawson Malpass (14 November 1910 – 16 October 1996) was an English novelist noted for witty descriptions of rural family life, notably of his creation, the extended Pentecost family. He also wrote historical fiction ranging from the late Middle Ages to Edwardian England, and acquired a devoted readership on the Continent, particularly in Germany, where most of his books were translated.

== Life ==
Born in Derby and educated at King Henry VIII School, Coventry, Malpass, while writing in his spare time, worked for Barclays Bank in Long Eaton, Derbyshire. He would return home after a day's work and spend the evening writing. He was a regular contributor to Argosy, a short story magazine although it took him many years before he was first published. Many other short story magazines took his work and in 1955 he won the Observer short story competition.

His first book, Beefy Jones, soon followed, and then Morning's at Seven which received good reviews, but poor sales in the UK. However, it topped the bestseller list of Der Spiegel in Germany and remained there for three years, after which it was stipulated that no book could remain there for so long in future. After his initial successes, especially with Morning's at Seven, he turned to writing full-time. The bank refused initially to accept his resignation, then said he would forfeit his pension and only changed its mind after very protracted discussions.

Married, with one son, two granddaughters and five great‑grandchildren, Malpass lived in Long Eaton until five years before his death, when he moved to Bishop's Waltham in Hampshire.

== Novels ==
Tales from the Pentecost Family:

- Morning's at Seven (London: Heinemann, 1965)
- At the Height of the Moon (London: Heinemann, 1967)
- Fortinbras Has Escaped (London: Pan Books, 1970)
- The Long Long Dances (London: Corgi, 1978)
- Summer Awakening (London: Corgi, 1978)
- Evensong (1982)
- Pig-in-the-Middle (1989)

Other humorous novels:

- Beefy Jones (London: Longmans, Green & Co., 1957)
- Oh My Darling Daughter (London: Eyre & Spottiswoode, 1970)
- Familie Limmerick (1971)

The Shakespeare Trilogy:

- Part I: Sweet Will (London: Macmillan, 1973)
- Part II: The Cleopatra Boy (London: Macmillan, 1974)
- Part III: A House of Women (London: Macmillan, 1975)

Other novels with historical background:

- The Wind Brings Up the Rain (London: Heinemann, 1978)
- The Raising of Lazarus Pike (1980)
- The Lamplight and the Stars (London: Hamlyn, 1985)
- Of Human Frailty (a biographical novel of Thomas Cranmer) (London: Robert Hale, 1986)

All his novels were republished in 2001 by House of Stratus.

== Short stories ==
- "The Return of the Moon Man"

== Film adaptations ==
Malpass's books have never been adapted into film in his native UK. However, following the huge success of his books in Germany, some of his books have been turned into successful film adaptations there.

- Morgens um sieben ist die Welt noch in Ordnung (In the Morning at Seven the World Is Still in Order) (West Germany, 1968) — directed by Kurt Hoffmann, starring Archibald Eser (as seven-year-old Gaylord Pentecost), Gerlinde Locker, Werner Hinz, Agnes Windeck and Diana Körner; music by James Last; based on Morning's at Seven
- Wenn süß das Mondlicht auf den Hügeln schläft (When Sweet Moonlight Is Sleeping in the Hills) (West Germany, 1969) — a sequel to the 1968 movie; directed by Wolfgang Liebeneiner, with more or less the same cast; based on At the Height of the Moon
- Als Mutter streikte (When Mother Went on Strike) (West Germany, 1974) — directed by Eberhard Schröder, starring Peter Hall, Johanna Matz, Gila von Weitershausen, Gaby Dohm and Elisabeth Flickenschildt; based on Oh My Darling Daughter
- Mon ami Gaylord (France, 1979) — a six-part mini-series directed by Pierre Goutas, also based on Morning's at Seven.
