= Mailman Mueller =

1953 film

- Directed by: John Reinhardt
- Written by: Ernst Neubach; Eberhard Keindorff; Johanna Sibelius
- Produced by: Heinz Rühmann; Kurt Ulrich
- Starring: Heinz Rühmann; Heli Finkenzeller; Wolfgang Condrus
- Cinematography: Kurt Schulz
- Edited by: Erich Palme
- Music by: Friedrich Schröder
- Production company: Berolina Film
- Distributed by: Herzog Film
- Release date: 1 October 1953
- Running time: 95 minutes
- Country: West Germany
- Language: German

Mailman Mueller (German: Briefträger Müller) is a 1953 West German comedy film directed by John Reinhardt and starring Heinz Rühmann, Heli Finkenzeller and Wolfgang Condrus. It was shot in Agfacolor at the Tempelhof Studios in West Berlin with sets designed by the art directors Willi Herrmann and Heinrich Weidemann. Location shooting took place at Meersburg on Lake Constance.

== Cast ==
- Heinz Rühmann as Titus Müller
- Heli Finkenzeller as Charlotte Müller
- Gisela Meyen as Mieze
- Wolfgang Condrus as Günter
- Rainer Gröbel as Karl-Heinz
- Susanne von Almassy as Mirabella
- Harald Paulsen as Bertram
- Trude Hesterberg as Aunt Anna
- Rolf Kutschera as Bobby
- Oskar Sima as Mr. Strobel
- Else Reval as Mrs. Strobel
- Eckart Dux as Hugo
- Angel Angelo
- Carl de Vogt
- Ludwig Trautmann
- Franz Arzdorf
- Curt Lucas
- Alexa von Porembsky
- Consuelo Korn
- Peter Paul Richter

== Soundtrack ==
- Egon Kaiser - "Movie music"
- Liselotte Malkowsky - "Drei Rosen im Mai" (Music by Friedrich Schröder, lyrics by Ignor)

== Bibliography ==
- Körner, Torsten. Der kleine Mann als Star: Heinz Rühmann und seine Filme der 50er Jahre. Campus Verlag, 2001.
