= The Last of Mrs. Cheyney (1961 film) =

1961 film by Franz Josef Wild

- Directed by: Franz Josef Wild
- Written by: Johanna Sibelius; Eberhard Keindorff
- Based on: The Last of Mrs. Cheyney; 1925 play by Frederick Lonsdale
- Produced by: Luggi Waldleitner
- Starring: Lilli Palmer; Carlos Thompson; Martin Held
- Cinematography: Günther Anders
- Edited by: Lisbeth Neumann
- Music by: Hans-Martin Majewski
- Production companies: Cinecustodia; Les Films Jacques Leitienne; Roxy Film
- Distributed by: Europa Filmverleih
- Release date: 24 August 1961
- Running time: 87 minutes
- Countries: France; Switzerland; West Germany
- Language: German

The Last of Mrs. Cheyney (German: Frau Cheneys Ende) is a 1961 comedy film directed by Franz Josef Wild and starring Lilli Palmer, Carlos Thompson and Martin Held. The film was made as a co-production between France, Switzerland and West Germany. It is based on the 1925 play of the same title by the British writer Frederick Lonsdale which has been adapted into films on several occasions.

The film's sets were designed by the art directors Wolf Englert and Bruno Monden. It premiered at the Gloria-Palast in Berlin.

== Cast ==
- Lilli Palmer as Frau Cheney
- Carlos Thompson as Artur Dilling
- Martin Held as Charles
- Françoise Rosay as Frau Ebley
- Maria Sebaldt as Helene
- Wolfgang Kieling as Dimanche
- Gisela Fischer as Joan
- Friedrich Schoenfelder as Jerome
- Ann Smyrner as Boubou
- Andreas Blum as Pierre
- Nora Minor as Krankenschwester
- Wolfgang Völz as George
- Horst Naumann as William
- Stanislav Ledinek as Achmed
- Herbert Grünbaum as Jim
- Erik Radolf as Roberts
- Willy Birgel as Lord Elton

== Bibliography ==
- Bock, Hans-Michael & Bergfelder, Tim. The Concise CineGraph. Encyclopedia of German Cinema. Berghahn Books, 2009.
