= Friedrich Schoenfelder =

German actor (1916–2011)

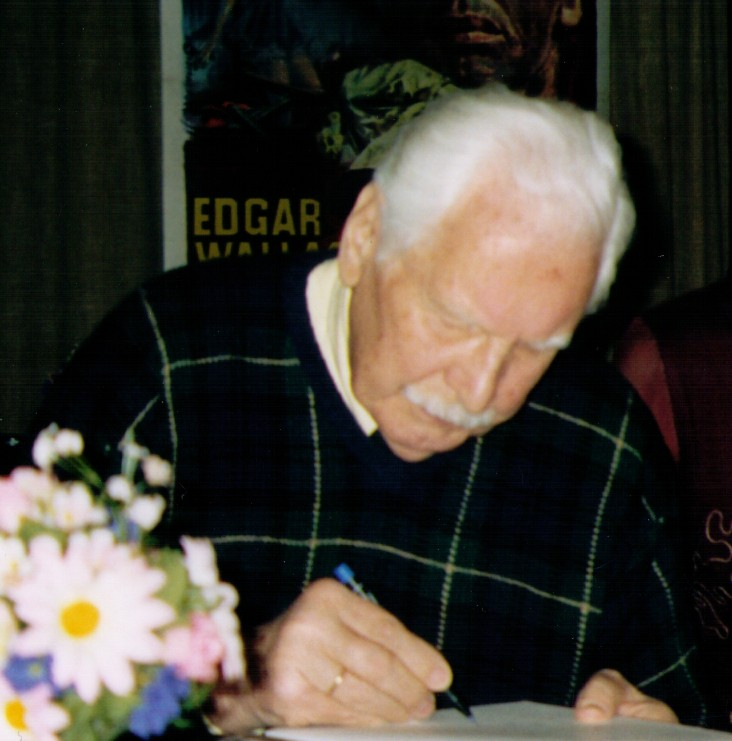
- Born: 17 October 1916; Sorau, Lower Lusatia, German Empire (present-day Żary, Poland)
- Died: 14 August 2011 (aged 94); Berlin, Germany
- Occupation: Actor
- Years active: 1936–2011

Friedrich Schoenfelder (17 October 1916 – 14 August 2011) was a German actor.

Schoenfelder was born in Sorau/Lower Lusatia and died in Berlin. He was 94. He was the German dubbing voice of David Niven and Vincent Price. In the German version of Star Wars, he voiced Peter Cushing as Grand Moff Tarkin, a role that Schoenfelder would reprise in the 2008 German audio drama Dark Lord (based on James Lucenos novel Dark Lord: The Rise of Darth Vader) - ISBN 978-3-8291-2157-6.

== Selected filmography ==
- Tragödie einer Leidenschaft (1949) - Dodja
- Royal Children (1950) - Prinz Alexander 'Sascha' von Thessalien
- Five Suspects (1950) - Dr. Sven Berling
- Love on Ice (1950) - Birger Sörensen
- Victoria and Her Hussar (1954) - Sandor Koltay
- Von der Liebe besiegt (1956) - Versicherungsdirektor
- Escape from Sahara (1958) - Commander Goullon
- Der eiserne Gustav (1958) - Deutscher Botschafter
- Peter Shoots Down the Bird (1959) - Toni Hartwig
- For Love and Others (1959) - Generaldirektor Schreiber
- Menschen im Hotel (1959) - Empfangschef
- Abschied von den Wolken (1959) - Rev. Wilson
- The High Life (1960) - Ranowsky
- Ein Student ging vorbei (1960)
- The Avenger (1960) - Jack Jackson
- Until Money Departs You (1960) - Richter
- Willy, der Privatdetektiv (1960) - Direktor Schieske
- Sabine und die 100 Männer (1960) - William Hellberg
- My Husband, the Economic Miracle (1961) - Dr. Bach, Syndikus
- The Last of Mrs. Cheyney (1961) - Jerome
- Jeder stirbt für sich allein (1962, TV Movie) - Staatsschauspieler Harteisen
- Wild Water (1962) - Baron Ferdinand von Lindner
- Only a Woman (1962) - Kellner
- The White Spider (1963) - Sir James
- The Black Abbot (1963) - Dr. Loxon
- The Inn on Dartmoor (1964) - Sir James
- Long Legs, Long Fingers (1966) - General
- Hotel Clausewitz (1967) - Dr. Rudolf Zabel
- Schleicher – General der letzten Stunde (1967, TV film) - Franz von Papen
- Der Tod läuft hinterher (1967, TV Mini-Series) - David Stone
- If It's Tuesday, This Must Be Belgium (1969) - (scenes deleted)
- De Sade (1969) - Marquis' Father
- Gentlemen in White Vests (1970) - Kaufhausdirektor (uncredited)
- Heintje – Einmal wird die Sonne wieder scheinen (1970) - Kommissar
- What Is the Matter with Willi? (1970) - Dr. Senn
- Unsere Pauker gehen in die Luft (1970) - Schulrat
- The Body in the Thames (1971) - Anthony Wyman
- Aufwind (1979)
- The Magician of Lublin (1979) - Count Zaruski
- Kiez (1983)
- Boundaries of Time: Caspar David Friedrich (1986) - Museumsdirektor
- Gestatten, Bestatter (1986) - Friedrich Barnewitz
- Otto: The New Movie (1987) - Professor Edelsen
- Instructor Schmidt (2008) - Neighbor Karl

=== Voice acting ===
- A Day Will Come (1950) - Narrator (voice, uncredited)
- The Miracle of Father Malachia (1961) - Zeitungsredakteur / Nachrichtensprecher / Bärtiger bei Architekturpräsentation (voice, uncredited)
- The Secret of Dr. Mabuse (1964) - Jason Monta (voice, uncredited)
- Torment of the Flesh (1965) - Prosecutor (voice, uncredited)
- Two Girls from the Red Star (1966) - Michael Astor (voice, uncredited)
- Kiss Kiss, Kill Kill (1966) - Doorman at Atlantic Motel (voice, uncredited)
- Kommissar X – Drei gelbe Katzen (1966) - Todd (voice, uncredited)
- The Battle of the Mods (1966) - Captain Landers (voice, uncredited)
- Maigret and His Greatest Case (1966) - Museumsdirektor (voice, uncredited)
- Death Trip (1967) - Konsul Snyder (voice, uncredited)
- The Doctor of St. Pauli (1968) - Pfarrer Feddersen (voice, uncredited)
- Heintje: A Heart Goes on a Journey (1969) - Schweizer Grenzpolizist (voice, uncredited)
- Mark of the Devil (1970) - Narrator (uncredited)
- The Swingin' Stewardesses (1971) - Businessman (English version, voice, uncredited)
- Everyone Dies Alone (1976) - Direktor der Sargfabrik (voice, uncredited)
- Stowaways on the Ark (1988) - Der Alte (voice)
- The Seventh Brother (1991) - (German version, voice)
- Momo (2001) - Hora (German version) (voice)
- Cars (2006) - Doc Hudson (German version) (voice)
- Der kleine König Macius - Der Film (2007) - König Friedewald (voice)

== Audiobooks ==
- 2007: Aus meinem Leben. Audiobook, Biography, read by the author - publisher: Michael Jung Verlag, ISBN 978-3-89882-084-4
- 2010: Charles Dickens: Ein Weihnachtslied in Prosa (A Christmas Carol), publisher: Steinbach sprechende Bücher, ISBN 978-3-86974-043-0
