= Heart's Desire (1951 film) =

1951 film

- Directed by: Paul Martin
- Written by: Eberhard Keindorff; Paul Martin; Johanna Sibelius
- Based on: D-Zug, 517 by Maria Peteani
- Produced by: Eberhard Klagemann
- Starring: Hans Hotter; Linda Caroll; Rainer Penkert
- Cinematography: Werner Krien
- Edited by: Gertrud Hinz
- Music by: Lothar Brühne
- Production company: Klagemann-Film
- Distributed by: Anton E. Dietz-Filmverleih
- Release date: 19 January 1951
- Running time: 80 minutes
- Country: West Germany
- Language: German

Heart's Desire (German: Die Sehnsucht des Herzens) is a 1951 West German musical drama film directed by Paul Martin and starring Hans Hotter, Linda Caroll and Rainer Penkert. It is based on the novel D-Zug, 517 by the Austrian writer Maria Peteani. It was shot at the Bavaria Studios in Munich and on location around the city. The film's sets were designed by the art directors Bruno Monden and Hermann Warm. It is also known by the alternative title Spring Romance (German: Frühlingsromanze)

== Synopsis ==
After a traffic accident the attractive young Ebba is taken to hospital where she encounters the celebrated Kammersänger Lindner. She quickly falls in love with him and believes he reciprocates her feeling, although he has really sworn off romance to concentrate only on his music. Ebba's friend Richard, who has a secret passion for her, is distressed to see that she has eyes only for Lindner now.

== Cast ==
- Hans Hotter as Kammersänger Lindner
- Linda Caroll as Das Mädchen Ebba
- Rainer Penkert as Richard Sturm
- Eva Marie Andres as Fräulein Dr. Dorner
- Rolf von Nauckhoff as Chefarzt Dr. Thomas
- Lola Müthel as Frau Kammersänger
- Arno Paulsen as Manager Winternitz
- Eva-Maria Dühan as Frau Karsten
- Nicolas Koline asProf. Wolkoff
- Brigitte Ratz as Lischen Holbaum
- Ferdinand Anton as Peter Stille
- Willem Holsboer as Schofför
- Ulrich Beiger as Assistenzarzt

== Bibliography ==
- Bock, Hans-Michael & Bergfelder, Tim. The Concise CineGraph. Encyclopedia of German Cinema. Berghahn Books, 2009.
- Goble, Alan. The Complete Index to Literary Sources in Film. Walter de Gruyter, 1999.
