= Liselotte of the Palatinate (1966 film) =

1966 film

- Directed by: Kurt Hoffmann
- Written by: Eberhard Keindorff; Johanna Sibelius
- Produced by: Heinz Angermeyer
- Starring: Heidelinde Weis; Harald Leipnitz; Karin Hübner
- Cinematography: Richard Angst
- Edited by: Claus von Boro
- Music by: Franz Grothe
- Production company: Independent Film
- Distributed by: Constantin Film
- Release date: 7 October 1966
- Running time: 99 minutes
- Country: West Germany
- Language: German

Liselotte of the Palatinate (German: Liselotte von der Pfalz) is a 1966 West German historical comedy film directed by Kurt Hoffmann and starring Heidelinde Weis, Harald Leipnitz and Karin Hübner. It portrays the marriage of the German princess Liselotte of the Palatinate to Philippe I, Duc d'Orléans, the brother of Louis XIV, and her adventures at the French court.

An earlier film about her life starring Renate Müller was released in 1935.

== Production ==
It was shot at the Spandau Studios in West Berlin, Charlottenburg Palace and on location in Munich and Czechoslovakia. The film's sets were designed by the art director Otto Pischinger.

== Cast ==
- Heidelinde Weis as Liselotte von der Pfalz
- Harald Leipnitz as Herzog von Orléans
- Karin Hübner as Prinzessin Palatine
- Hans Caninenberg as König Ludwig XIV
- Robert Dietl as Lorraine
- Gunnar Möller as Herzog von Kurland
- Erwin Linder as Kurfürst Karl Ludwig von der Pfalz
- Joachim Teege as Abbé
- Else Quecke as Frau von Bienenfeld
- Karla Chadimová as Paulete
- Friedrich von Thun as Rudo
- Andreas Blum as Beauvais
- Gisela Fackeldey
- Daniela Smutná as Madame de Montespan
- Anton Smida as Louvois
- Herbert Fux as Lorraines Diener

== Bibliography ==
- Bock, Hans-Michael; Bergfelder, Tim, eds. (2009). The Concise Cinegraph: Encyclopaedia of German Cinema. New York: Berghahn Books. ISBN 978-1-57181-655-9.
