= Jan Hendriks =

German actor (1928–1991)

- Born: 6 December 1928; Berlin, Germany
- Died: 13 December 1991 (aged 63); Berlin, Germany
- Occupation: Actor
- Years active: 1950–1985

Jan Hendriks (6 December 1928 – 13 December 1991) was a German film actor. He appeared in more than 80 films on screen and TV between 1950 and 1985. In 1952 he won the German Film Award as Best Male Newcomer. Between 1977–1985 he co-starred in the TV crime serial The Old Fox.

In 1959, he was charged under Paragraph 175 of the German Criminal Code, which was still in force at the time. He was fined.

After a serious motorbike accident in 1963, he was in a coma for several months but suffered no lasting effects.

In the 1960s, he appeared in several Edgar Wallace films. Hendriks also worked as a dubbing artist in the 1960s, lending his voice to Humphrey Bogart (The Petrified Forest), Anthony Quinn (Guadalcanal – Hell in the Pacific), Robert Stack (To Be or Not to Be) and Robert Stephens (Cleopatra). His film work came to an end in the late 1960s. From the 1950s onwards, he also worked in television and appeared in several series. From 1977 to 1986, he played Detective Martin Brenner alongside Siegfried Lowitz in the television series Der Alte. He was also occasionally engaged in theatre tours, where he appeared in his last role in 1988.

Hendriks was found dead by the police in his Berlin flat on 17 December 1991 after they had been notified by neighbours. He had died alone there a few days after his 63rd birthday and was not discovered for several days. The press reported that the cause of death was the effects of HIV/AIDS. He had also suffered from diabetes for many years

== Selected filmography ==
- Der Engel mit dem Saitenspiel (1944) - Minor Role (uncredited)
- The Green Salon (1944) - Minor Role (uncredited)
- Anna Alt (1945) - Minor Role (uncredited)
- The Big Lift (1950) - Minor Role (uncredited)
- Dark Eyes (1951) - Jan Krapp
- The Sinful Border (1951) - Laszlo
- The Sergeant's Daughter (1952) - Leutnant Christian von Lauffen
- Queen of the Arena (1952) - Tonio, Artist
- Wedding Bells (1954) - Philip Harding
- The Angel with the Flaming Sword (1954) - Freddy
- Heimweh nach Deutschland (1954) - Erik Olsen
- Homesick for Germany (1954) - Dr. Michelsen
- The Barrings (1955) - Graf Wilda
- Alibi (1955) - Berthold
- Magic Fire (1956) - Michael Bakunin
- My Brother Joshua (1956) - Hans Donath, beider Sohn
- Der Bauerndoktor von Bayrischzell (1957) - Stephan Doppelsieder - Sohn
- Spielbank-Affäre (1957) - Gerhard
- Jägerblut (1957) - Toni Moosbacher
- The Green Devils of Monte Cassino (1958) - Fausto
- Das verbotene Paradies (1958) - Dr. Theo Krailing
- Arms and the Man (1958, AAN) - Leutnant Sergius Slivitzna
- Nackt wie Gott sie schuf (1958) - Paul
- Bobby Dodd greift ein (1959)
- A Doctor of Conviction (1959) - Felix Friedberg
- Love Now, Pay Later (1959) - Heinz Pohlmann, ein Freund
- Paradise for Sailors (1959) - Henry F. Jones
- The Juvenile Judge (1960) - Dr. Holzer (uncredited)
- The High Life (1960) - Le neveu
- Brainwashed (1960) - First Officer
- Flitterwochen in der Hölle (1960) - Mario Bertelli
- Mal drunter – mal drüber (1960) - Manfred
- Island of the Amazons (1960) - Murdok
- The Devil's Daffodil (1961) - Charles
- Murder Party (1961) - Dahlberg (voice, uncredited)
- Immer wenn es Nacht wird (1961) - Bobby Elkins
- The Door with Seven Locks (1962) - Tom Cawler
- The Inn on the River (1962) - Roger Lane
- Stahlnetz: Spur 211 (1962, TV series episode) - Roger Lane
- The Squeaker (1963) - Thomas Leslie
- With Best Regards (1963) - Muppilein, ihr Verlobter
- Tim Frazer: Der Fall Salinger (1964, TV series) - Kellner Ian
- Mark of the Tortoise (1964) - Carlos
- Buffalo Bill, Hero of the Far West (1965) - Monroe
- Duel at Sundown (1965) - Lord
- The College Girl Murders (1967) - Brent
- Non sta bene rubare il tesoro (1967) - Da Costa
- Der Tod läuft hinterher (1967, TV miniseries) - Dan Low
- Im Schloß der blutigen Begierde (1968) - Georg v. Kassell
- Babeck (1968, TV miniseries) - Bleriot
- Rebus (1969) - Manager of the Playboy Club
- The Man with the Glass Eye (1969) - Rubiro
- Hotel Royal (1969, TV film) - Legrand
- Heintje – Einmal wird die Sonne wieder scheinen (1970) - Willi
- Guns of War (Uzicka Republika) (1974) - Nemacki major
- Derrick (1975-1976, TV series) - Barkeeper / Schlott / Dreyer
- The Old Fox (1977–1986, TV series) - Polizeiinspektor Martin Brenner (final appearance)
- Alcaptar (1978) - Soldat
- Ein gutes Land (1982)
