= Five Suspects =

1950 film

- Poster with one of the film's alternative titles
- Directed by: Kurt Hoffmann
- Written by: Johanna Sibelius; Eberhard Keindorff; Herbert Moll; Rudolf Baecker
- Produced by: Artur Brauner
- Starring: Hans Nielsen; Dorothea Wieck; Friedrich Schoenfelder
- Cinematography: Bruno Stephan
- Edited by: Johanna Meisel
- Music by: Herbert Trantow
- Production company: CCC Films
- Release date: 3 March 1950
- Running time: 85 minutes
- Country: West Germany
- Language: German

Five Suspects (German: Fünf unter Verdacht, lit. 'Five Under Suspicion') is a 1950 West German crime film directed by Kurt Hoffmann and starring Hans Nielsen, Dorothea Wieck and Friedrich Schoenfelder. It is also known by the alternative title of City in the Fog.

The film's sets were designed by the art directors Franz Bi and Botho Hoefer. It was shot at the Spandau Studios in Berlin.

== Cast ==
- Hans Nielsen as Kriminalrat Thomsen
- Dorothea Wieck as Frau Berling
- Friedrich Schoenfelder as Dr. Sven Berling
- Ina Halley as Ingrid Sörensen
- Blandine Ebinger as Margarite Lassens
- Josef Sieber as Schuldiener Palsberg / Erik Palsberg, dessen Bruder
- Franz Nicklisch as Karl Jensen
- Hans Leibelt as Schuldirektor Dr. Lassens
- Henry Lorenzen as Kriminalassistent Aalsen
- Lutz Moik as Klaus Eriksen
- Gunnar Möller as Ole Klimm
- Friedhelm von Petersson as Jacob Eriksen
- Horst Gentzen as Arne Hansen
- Thomas Lundberg as Knud Petersen
- Karl Klüsner as Oberlehrer Falster
- A. Koch as Arzt
- Jo Hanns Müller as Man
- Arno Paulsen as Vater Gustav Klimm
- Gustav Püttjer as Ohlsen
- Ottokar Runze as Schüler
- Werner Schott as Kriminalkommissar Ribe
- Kurt Waitzmann as Studienrat Dr. Claudius

== Bibliography ==
- Bergfelder, Tim. International Adventures: German Popular Cinema and European Co-Productions in the 1960s. Berghahn Books, 2005.
