= Condemned to Sin =

1964 film

- Directed by: Alfred Weidenmann
- Written by: Eberhard Keindorff; Johanna Sibelius
- Based on: Die Festung by Henry Jaeger
- Produced by: Eberhard Klagemann
- Starring: Martin Held; Hildegard Knef; Heidelinde Weis
- Cinematography: Enzo Serafin
- Edited by: Hermine Diethelm
- Music by: Wolfgang Kabitzky
- Production companies: Eichberg-Film; Team-Film
- Distributed by: Nora-Filmverleih
- Release date: 25 September 1964
- Running time: 104 minutes
- Country: West Germany
- Language: German

Condemned to Sin (German: Verdammt zur Sünde) is a 1964 West German drama film directed by Alfred Weidenmann and starring Martin Held, Hildegard Knef and Heidelinde Weis.

The film's sets were designed by the art director Hertha Hareiter. Location shooting took place in Austria at Rapottenstein Castle and around the city of Wels.

== Plot ==
Germany at the time of the economic miracle. Hugo Starosta, expelled from the part of eastern Germany annexed by Poland after the Second World War, is one of the few who failed to get their lives back on track during the years of reconstruction. Almost twenty years after the end of the war, he and his extended family still live in a fortress-like castle that is run by the state as a reception and refugee camp and has increasingly become a social housing project. The accommodation — a one-room emergency quarters for eight people from three generations — is run-down, poor and filthy, Starosta herself is work-shy and blabbering, imperious and sometimes choleric. His children know nothing but this misery and threaten to neglect themselves. One of his offspring becomes a father at the age of 15, another, actually a factory worker, secretly works as a prostitute. Aggression, outbreaks of violence and unrestrained lifestyles are the order of the day.

While other camp residents strive to leave these degrading living conditions behind as quickly as possible, old Starosta has long since come to terms with these circumstances and even feels comfortable with it. He likes to mess with the authorities and eventually gets him and his clan allowed to stay while the other residents gradually evacuate the fortress. Starosta defends his miserable "paradise" with all consistency, he drives young intruders out of the little room — throwing things and giving out kicks. More and more, Hugo Starosta has become the patriarch of a family that has settled comfortably in the suspended precariat. Starosta proves to be a sullen bon vivant who only seems to take the initiative to escape from the prevailing conditions; for example, if he founds a kind of "transport company". However, his main day-to-day activity remains lounging around, making grand speeches and getting on the nerves of others.

The other Starostas and their personal environment also seem to spring from a panopticon of bizarre types; there is, for example, the elderly grandmother who simply does not want to die and complains about the coffin that she has already chosen and which she considers inferior. One of the Starosta sons, the shy Albert, has huge ears that determine all his thoughts and actions. Starosta's sister's boyfriend lives out his image as a chavish woman-pleaser, while the salesman, a gentle, modest man, represents the absolute antithesis to him. The two oldest Starosta sons have fled the fortress. Their names are Adolf and Hermann and they shed light on Hugo Starosta's political views up until 1945. Neighbor Alwine, as she says, "experienced certain things while fleeing" and hasn't really been interested in sex since then. Starosta's wife was also raped by Red Army soldiers, according to Hugo, but, according to Starosta, "it didn't bother her that much".

== Cast ==
- Martin Held as Hugo Starosta
- Hildegard Knef as Alwine
- Heidelinde Weis as Edeltraut
- Tilla Durieux as Die Großmutter
- Else Knott as Eliese Starosta
- Christa Linder as Mi Mo, deren Tochter
- Hubert Suschka as Victor, Alwines Mann
- Michael Ande as Albert, Starostas Sohn
- Alice Treff as Die Leiske
- René Egiomue as Bruno, das Nesthäkchen
- Robert Graf as Der Vertreter
- Peter Vogel as Hans
- Gertraud Jesserer as Dora
- Alexander Braumueller as Johann, Kainraths Sohn
- Joseph Offenbach as Kainrath, Kantinenwirt
- Reinhard Glemnitz as Anstaltsleiter
- Thomas Danneberg as Adolf, Starostas Sohn
- Franz Stoss as Direktor der Jugenderziehungsanstalt

== Bibliography ==
- Goble, Alan. The Complete Index to Literary Sources in Film. Walter de Gruyter, 1999.
