= Fritz Tillmann =

German actor

- Born: 13 December 1910; Frankfurt am Main, German Empire
- Died: October 30, 1986 (aged 75); Munich, West Germany
- Occupation: Actor

Fritz Tillmann (December 13, 1910 – October 30, 1986) was a German actor.

== Selected filmography ==
- Hoegler's Mission (1950) - Fritz Rottmann
- The Council of the Gods (1950) - Dr. Hans Scholz
- Master of Life and Death (1955) - Dr. Peter
- Sacred Lie (1955)
- The Plot to Assassinate Hitler (1955) - General Henning von Tresckow
- The Major and the Bulls (1955) - Major William Sunlet
- The Girl from Flanders (1956) - Hauptmann Lüdemann
- Love (1956) - Herr Ballard
- The Story of Anastasia (1956) - Baron von Pleskau
- Von der Liebe besiegt (1956) - Leo Seduc, Marios Compagnon
- King in Shadow (1957) - Count Rantzau
- ...und die Liebe lacht dazu (1957) - Jan Dirksen
- All Roads Lead Home (1957) - Dr. Jacobs
- Doctor Crippen Lives (1958) - Kriminalinspektor Steen
- Confess, Doctor Corda (1958) - Oberinspektor Dr. Pohlhammer
- Es war die erste Liebe (1958) - Andreas Bergmann
- Der Schinderhannes (1958) - Hans Bast
- Skandal um Dodo (1959) - Baldur von Dieringen
- The Man Who Sold Himself (1959) - Dr. Schilling
- As the Sea Rages (1959) - Captain Stassi
- The Goose of Sedan (1959) - Hauptmann Knöpfer
- Hauptmann - deine Sterne (1960) - Arnold Steif, Bürgermeister
- My Husband, the Economic Miracle (1961) - Alexander Engelmann
- Man in the Shadows (1961) - Born, Kriminalrat
- Two Among Millions (1961) - Petersen
- It Can't Always Be Caviar (1961) - General von Felseneck
- This Time It Must Be Caviar (1961) - General von Felseneck
- Auf Wiedersehen (1961) - George Dalton
- Das Mädchen und der Staatsanwalt (1962) - Dr. Stoll, Verteidiger
- Black-White-Red Four Poster (1962) - Schuldirektor
- The Bandit and the Princess (1962) - Fürst Zeno
- The Curse of the Yellow Snake (1963) - Joe Bray
- Moral 63 (1963) - Eduard Meyer-Cleve, Industrieller
- The House in Montevideo (1963) - Bürgermeister
- And So to Bed (1963) - Gerhard Themann
- The Secret of Dr. Mabuse (1964) - Dr. Krishna (voice, uncredited)
- The Monster of London City (1964) - Sir George
- Praetorius (1965) - Dr. Klotz
- Hocuspocus (1966) - Staatsanwalt
- Call Girls of Frankfurt (1966) - Rudolf Nickel
- Onkel Filser (1966) - Bezirksamtmann Traugott Stiebner
- Zärtliche Haie (1967) - Admiral
- The Great Happiness (1967) - Nic Parnassis
- The Heathens of Kummerow (1967) - Müller Düker
- On the Reeperbahn at Half Past Midnight (1969) - Christof Lauritz
- The Priest of St. Pauli (1970) - Nieby (voice, uncredited)
- Die Feuerzangenbowle (1970) - Direktor Knauer
- Twenty Girls and the Teachers (1971) - Dr. Birnbaum
- Wir hau'n den Hauswirt in die Pfanne (1971) - Hugo Zwicknagel
- Morgen fällt die Schule aus (1971) - Kurt Nietnagel
- Captain Typhoon (1971) - Konsul Armin von Prossnitz
- Three Men in the Snow (1974) - Kühne
- One or the Other of Us (1974) - Dr. Sievers
- Die Jugendstreiche des Knaben Karl (1977) - Hirsch
- The Abduction of the Sabine Women (1983, TV film) - Karl Gross
