= I Was an Ugly Girl =

- Poster
- Directed by: Wolfgang Liebeneiner
- Written by: Eberhard Keindorff; Johanna Sibelius
- Based on: Ich war ein häßliches Mädchen by Annemarie Selinko
- Produced by: Heinrich Jonen
- Starring: Sonja Ziemann; Dieter Borsche; Karlheinz Böhm
- Cinematography: Bruno Stephan
- Edited by: Walter von Bonhorst
- Music by: Herbert Trantow
- Production company: Cine-Allianz Tonfilmproduktions Meteor-Film
- Distributed by: Constantin Film
- Release date: 25 August 1955
- Running time: 96 minutes
- Country: West Germany
- Language: German

I Was an Ugly Girl (German: Ich war ein häßliches Mädchen) is a 1955 West German romantic comedy film directed by Wolfgang Liebeneiner and starring Sonja Ziemann, Dieter Borsche and Karlheinz Böhm. It is based on the 1937 novel of the same title by Annemarie Selinko. It was shot at the Spandau Studios in West Berlin. The film's sets were designed by the art directors Mathias Matthies and Ellen Schmidt.

== Cast ==
- Sonja Ziemann as Anneliese Howald
- Dieter Borsche as Claudio Pauls
- Karlheinz Böhm as Thomas von Bley
- Marianne Wischmann as Lilian Markowski
- Erika Remberg as Inge Howald, Annelieses Schwester
- Tatjana Sais as Tante Elsa
- Olga Chekhova as Luise Raymond
- Maly Delschaft as Madame Lax
- Bruno Fritz as Alexander Howald, Vater von Anneliese
- Evelyn Künneke as Singer
- Curt Lucas as Diener Franz
- Myriam Lynn as Grace Morton
- Wolfgang Neuss as Journalist Mopp
- Peter Preses as Plumberger
- Fritz Rémond Jr. as Verleger Bierbaum
- Ingrid Schwarz as Erika, Verkäuferin
- Alexa von Porembsky as Frau Howald
