= Everything Will Be Better in the Morning =

1948 film directed by Arthur Maria Rabenalt

- Directed by: Arthur Maria Rabenalt
- Written by: Friedrich Dammann; Werner P. Zibaso
- Based on: The novel Tomorrow is Another Day by Annemarie Selinko
- Produced by: Peter Wehrand
- Starring: Ellen Schwanneke; Jakob Tiedtke; Grethe Weiser
- Cinematography: Kurt Schulz
- Edited by: Walter Boos
- Music by: Werner Bochmann
- Production company: Berolina Film
- Distributed by: Herzog Film
- Release date: 21 December 1948
- Running time: 97 minutes
- Country: Germany
- Language: German

Everything Will Be Better in the Morning (German: Morgen ist alles besser) is a 1948 German comedy film directed by Arthur Maria Rabenalt and starring Ellen Schwanneke, Jakob Tiedtke and Grethe Weiser. The film's sets were designed by the art director Ernst H. Albrecht.

== Cast ==
- Ellen Schwanneke as Christiane Borck alias Christl Bark
- Jakob Tiedtke as Friedrich Borck, ihr Vater
- Grethe Weiser as Florentine Kneefke, ihre Tante
- Paul Klinger as Dr. Axel Robert, Rundfunk-Regisseur
- Fita Benkhoff as Peggy Hansen, Schauspielerin
- Marianne Berger as Frau Professor Grabel
- Erika Engler as Mary Ladner, Schülerin
- Gerd Frickhöffer as Rundfunk-Intendant Meyer-Genthin
- Walter Janssen as Theodor Weller, gen. Onkel Theodor
- Fritz Kampers as Sepp Sedlmeyer, Ex-Schwergewichtsmeister
- Ursula Klinke as Hansi Klapp, Schülerin
- Franz-Otto Krüger as Dr. Linck, Dichter
- Alexandra Moscalenko as Marion Sörensen, Schülerin
- Rudolf Prack as Thomas Schott, Sportberichterstatter
- Karl Schopp as Dr. Alex Holthoff - Schulrat
- Erika von Thellmann as Frl. Dr. Mikula, Studienträtin

== See also ==
- Tomorrow It Will Be Better (1939)

== Bibliography ==
- Rentschler, Eric, ed. (2013). German Film and Literature: Adaptations and Transformations. Routledge. ISBN 978-1-136-36873-8.
