= Only a Woman (1962 film) =

1962 film

- Directed by: Alfred Weidenmann
- Written by: Eberhard Keindorff; Johanna Sibelius
- Produced by: Leif Feilberg; Preben Philipsen; Horst Wendlandt
- Starring: Maria Schell; Paul Hubschmid; Hans Nielsen
- Cinematography: Heinz Hölscher
- Edited by: Walter Wischniewsky
- Music by: Peter Thomas
- Production company: Rialto Film
- Distributed by: Gloria Film
- Release date: 30 November 1962
- Running time: 86 minutes
- Country: West Germany
- Language: German

Only a Woman (German: Ich bin auch nur eine Frau) is a 1962 West German romantic comedy film directed by Alfred Weidenmann and starring Maria Schell, Paul Hubschmid and Hans Nielsen.

The film's sets were designed by the art director Helmut Nentwig. It was shot at the Spandau Studios and on location in Hamburg and West Berlin.

== Plot ==
A psychiatrist's love life becomes confused with that of her patients, due to her own complex issues.

== Cast ==
- Maria Schell as Lilli König
- Paul Hubschmid as Martin Bohlen
- Hans Nielsen as Dr. Katz, Nervenarzt
- Agnes Windeck as Wanda, Housekeeper
- Anita Höfer as Pauline
- Ingrid van Bergen as Annabella
- Hannelore Auer as Gerda
- Tilly Lauenstein as Mrs. Starke
- Frank Glaubrecht as Heinz Feldmann
- Michael Hinz
- Margarete Knitsch as Lollo
- Ulli Lommel
- Friedrich Schoenfelder as Kellner
- Ingeborg Sonsalla as Gitta
- Hilde Volk as Frau Feldmann

== Bibliography ==
- Martin Blaney. Symbiosis Or Confrontation?: The Relationship Between the Film Industry and Television in the Federal Republic of Germany from 1950 to 1985. Edition Sigma, 1992.
