= When Sweet Moonlight Is Sleeping in the Hills =

1969 film

- Directed by: Wolfgang Liebeneiner
- Written by: Eberhard Keindorff; Johanna Sibelius
- Based on: At the Height of the Moon by Eric Malpass
- Produced by: Heinz Angermeyer
- Starring: Werner Hinz; Luitgard Im; Diana Körner
- Cinematography: Franz Xaver Lederle
- Edited by: Annemarie Rokoss
- Music by: James Last
- Production company: Independent Film
- Distributed by: Constantin Film
- Release date: 3 October 1969
- Running time: 98 minutes
- Country: West Germany
- Language: German

When Sweet Moonlight Is Sleeping in the Hills (German: Wenn süß das Mondlicht auf den Hügeln schläft) is a 1969 West German drama film directed by Wolfgang Liebeneiner and starring Werner Hinz, Luitgard Im and Diana Körner. It is based on the 1967 novel At the Height of the Moon by Eric Malpass. It is the sequel to the 1968 film Morning's at Seven.

It was shot at the Spandau Studios in Berlin and on location around Bergisch Gladbach and Solingen in North Rhine-Westphalia. The film's sets were designed by the art director Werner Schlichting. It premiered at the UFA-Palast in Cologne.

== Cast ==
- Archibald Eser as Gaylord
- Irina von Bentheim as Emma
- Werner Hinz as Großvater
- Luitgard Im as May
- Werner Bruhns as Jocelyn
- Diana Körner as Becky
- Rolf Zacher as Peter
- Susanne Uhlen as Jenny
- Jürgen Lentzsch as David
- Ilse Fürstenberg as Frau Miller
- Gerd Lohmeyer as Willy
- Richard Haller as Schilling
- Wolfgang Petry as Bert

== Bibliography ==
- Staub, Alexandra. Conflicted Identities: Housing and the Politics of Cultural Representation. Routledge, 2015.
