= Hocuspocus (1966 film) =

1966 film

- Directed by: Kurt Hoffmann
- Written by: Curt Goetz (play); Eberhard Keindorff; Johanna Sibelius
- Produced by: Hans Domnick
- Starring: Heinz Rühmann; Liselotte Pulver; Fritz Tillmann
- Cinematography: Richard Angst
- Edited by: Dagmar Hirtz
- Music by: Franz Grothe
- Production companies: Hans Domnick Filmproduktion; Independent Film
- Distributed by: Constantin Film
- Release date: 3 March 1966
- Running time: 100 minutes
- Country: West Germany
- Language: German

Hocuspocus (German: Hokuspokus) is a 1966 West German comedy film directed by Kurt Hoffmann and starring Heinz Rühmann, Liselotte Pulver, and Fritz Tillmann. It is based on the 1926 play by Curt Goetz, which had previously been adapted into several film versions, Hocuspocus (1930), with a parallel version in English), and Hocuspocus (1953) with Goetz himself.

The film's sets were designed by the art director Otto Pischinger. It was shot at the Spandau Studios in Berlin.

== Cast ==
- Heinz Rühmann as Peer Bille
- Liselotte Pulver as Agda Kjerulf
- Fritz Tillmann as Prosecutor
- Richard Münch as Gerichtspräsident
- Stefan Wigger as Kunsthändler Amundsen
- Klaus Miedel as Mr. Graham
- Joachim Teege as Zeuge Munio Eunano
- Tatjana Sais as Zeugin Kiebutz
- Edith Elsholtz as Anne Sedal
- Käthe Braun as Frau Engstrand

== Bibliography ==
- Bock, Hans-Michael; Bergfelder, Tim, eds. (2009). The Concise Cinegraph: Encyclopaedia of German Cinema. New York: Berghahn Books. ISBN 978-1-57181-655-9.
