= Gunnar Möller =

German actor (1928–2017)

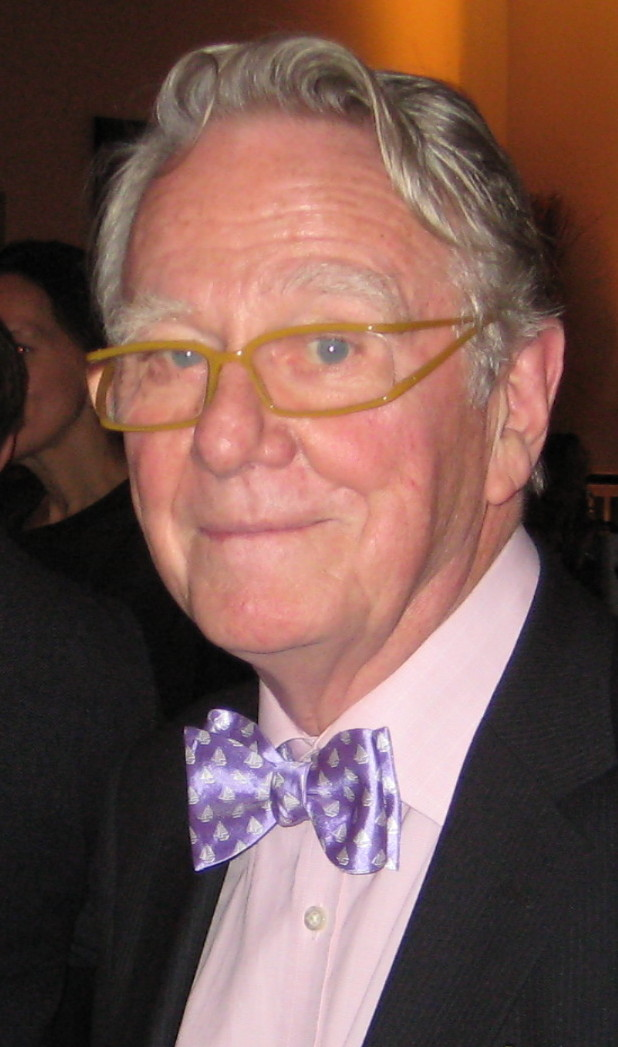
Gunnar Möller in 2008

Gunnar Möller (1 July 1928 – 16 May 2017) was a television and film actor of German-Swedish descent. He appeared in over 160 film and television productions between 1940 and 2016. He was most successful as a leading man in German cinema of the 1950s, especially with his role in I Often Think of Piroschka (1955) with Liselotte Pulver. He later turned to character roles and worked for a number of years in England, including the supporting role of Hans van Broecken in World War II drama series Secret Army.

He was married to the actress Brigitte Rau until her death in 1979, when he killed her during an argument in London. He was sentenced to five years in prison in England, but served only two and was able to continue his career in Germany.

In 2003, he married actress Christiane Hammacher, with whom he had performed in "Loriots Dramatische Werke" ("Loriot's Dramatic Works") at Frankfurt's Fritz Rémond Theater and on tour during the 1980s.

Möller died on 16 May 2017 in his hometown Berlin, aged 88.

== Selected filmography ==
- Our Miss Doctor (1940) - Ernst Schultze, Sextaner
- Kopf hoch, Johannes! (1941) - Wilhelm Panse
- Immer nur Du (1941) - Blumenjunge
- Her Other Self (1941) - Boy
- His Son (1942) - Willi, Herberts Sohn
- Between Heaven and Earth (1942)
- My Friend Josephine (1942) - Bote
- The Old Boss (1942) - Willy, Stalljunge
- A Flea in Her Ear (1943) - Jungknecht Willi
- Circus Renz (1943) - Willi, Bäckerjunge
- Fritze Bollmann wollte angeln (1943) - Orje
- Meine vier Jungens (1944) - Ulf Mertens
- Junge Adler (1944) - Spatz
- The Degenhardts (1944)
- Ein Blick zurück (1944) - Botenjunge Max
- The Green Salon (1944) - Jörgeli
- The Noltenius Brothers (1945) - Jürgen Noltenius, Sohn
- Leb' wohl, Christina (1945) - Schüler Kälble
- Wozzeck (1947) - Student
- Thank You, I'm Fine (1948) - Günther Holk
- Heimliches Rendezvous (1949) - Fritzchen
- Where the Trains Go (1949) - Gustav Dussmann
- I'll Make You Happy (1949) - Franz
- After the Rain Comes Sunshine (1949) - Polizist Otto
- Hans im Glück (1949)
- Five Suspects (1950) - Ole Klimm
- Gabriela (1950) - Peter Hoyer
- Abundance of Life (1950) - Felix Engler, Student
- The Man Who Wanted to Live Twice (1950)
- Die Jungen vom Kranichsee (1950) - Schulhelfer Heider
- Taxi-Kitty (1950) - Boy Fritz
- A Heidelberg Romance (1951) - William Edwards jr
- The Imaginary Invalid (1952) - Peter
- A Thousand Red Roses Bloom (1952) - Himpemax
- Until We Meet Again (1952) - Pamelas Freund
- Holiday From Myself (1952) - Michael Matz, genannt Thomas
- Marriage for One Night (1953) - Putzi
- Salto Mortale (1953) - Kurt
- Dutch Girl (1953) - Jan
- The Dancing Heart (1953) - Viktor
- Wedding Bells (1954) - Klaus Eckhoff

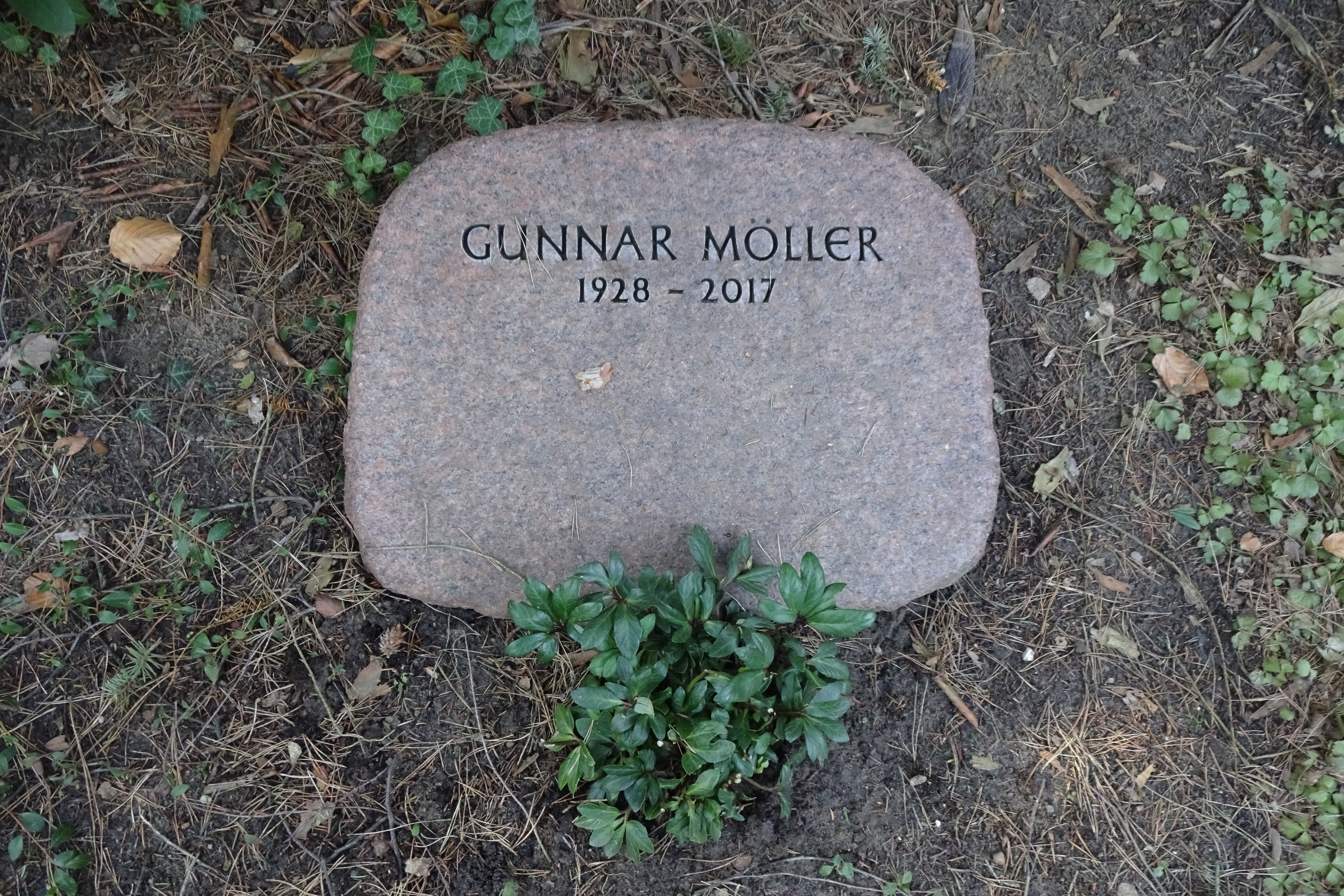
Möller's grave in Parkfriedhof Lichterfelde

- Love and Trumpets (1954) - Nikolaus von Laffen
- The Seven Dresses of Katrin (1954) - Hans, der Flieger
- A House Full of Love (1954) - Lutz
- Hoheit lassen bitten (1954) - Leutenant von Wörth
- Son Without a Home (1955) - Berthold Müller
- I Often Think of Piroschka (1955) - Andreas
- Rosmarie kommt aus Wildwest (1956) - Willy Sanders
- My Brother Joshua (1956) - Christoph Wiesner
- Was die Schwalbe sang (1956) - Peter Hansen
- Das Donkosakenlied (1956) - Dr. Heinz Stark
- The Tour Guide of Lisbon (1956) - Sebastian, Art Painter
- The Winemaker of Langenlois (1957) - Jörg Strasser, Volksschullehrer
- Wie schön, daß es dich gibt (1957) - Dr. Hubert Hinz
- The Daring Swimmer (1957) - Dr. Richard Moebius
- At Green Cockatoo by Night (1957) - Knut Peters, Medizinstudent
- Ist Mama nicht fabelhaft? (1958) - Axel Meinrad
- Thirteen Old Donkeys (1958) - Walter
- Stalingrad: Dogs, Do You Want to Live Forever? (1959) - Leutnant Fuhrmann
- SOS Pacific (1959) - Krauss
- Darkness Fell on Gotenhafen (1960) - Kurt Reiser
- Bombs on Monte Carlo (1960) - Burg
- The True Jacob (1960) - Jimmy
- Drei weiße Birken (1961) - Maler Fritz Mauschner
- Season in Salzburg (1961) - Dr. Erich Elz
- Freddy and the Song of the South Pacific (1962) - Hein
- The Post Has Gone (1962) - Franz
- Zwei blaue Vergissmeinnicht (1963) - Ronny
- Erotikon (1963) - Der Freund
- Apartmentzauber (1963) - Thomas Butterfield jr.
- If You Go Swimming in Tenerife (1964) - Jens
- The Girl from the Islands (1964) - Jochen
- Liselotte of the Palatinate (1966) - Herzog von Kurland
- Eine große Familie (1970, TV Movie) - Dr. Durst
- Days of Betrayal (1973) - Adolf Hitler
- The Odessa File (1974) - Karl Braun
- The Liberation of Prague (1977) - Adolf Hitler
- Due to an Act of God (1983, TV Movie) - Journalist Kaiser
- Die Nacht der vier Monde (1984) - Peter
- Der Geschichtenerzähler (1989) - Kommissar
- Oktoberfest (2005) - Edmund
- The Misplaced World (2015) - Ralf Kromberger
- The Confessions (2016) - (final film role)
