= Annemarie Selinko =

Austrian novelist

- Born: 1 September 1914; Vienna, Austria
- Died: 28 July 1986 (aged 71); Copenhagen, Denmark
- Resting place: Hellerup Cemetery
- Occupation: Writer
- Writing career
- Notable work: Désirée

Annemarie Selinko (1 September 1914 – 28 July 1986) was an Austrian novelist who wrote a number of best-selling books in German from the 1930s through the 1950s. Although she had been based in Germany, in 1939 at the start of World War II she took refuge in Denmark with her Danish husband, but then in 1943, they again became refugees, this time to Sweden.

Many of her novels have been adapted into movies and all have been translated into numerous languages. Her last work Désirée (1951) was about Désirée Clary, the one-time fiancée of Napoleon Bonaparte and later Queen of Sweden and Norway. It is dedicated to her sister Liselotte, who was murdered by the Nazis. Translated into 25 languages, in 1954 it was turned into a major Hollywood film starring Marlon Brando and Jean Simmons.

== Bibliography ==
=== Novels ===
- Ich war ein häßliches Mädchen (I Was an Ugly Girl), Vienna: Kirschner Verlag, 1937
- Morgen ist alles besser (US title: Tomorrow Is Another Day, UK title: Everything Will Be Better Tomorrow), 1939
- Heute heiratet mein Mann (My Husband Marries Today), 1943
- Désirée, 1952

== Filmography ==
- Tomorrow It Will Be Better, directed by Frederic Zelnik (Netherlands, 1939, based on the novel Morgen ist alles besser)
- I dag gifter sig min man, directed by Ragnar Arvedson (Sweden, 1943, based on the novel Heute heiratet mein Mann)
- Everything Will Be Better in the Morning, directed by Arthur Maria Rabenalt (West Germany, 1948, based on the novel Morgen ist alles besser)
- Désirée, directed by Henry Koster (1954, based on the novel Désirée)
- I Was an Ugly Girl, directed by Wolfgang Liebeneiner (West Germany, 1955, based on the novel Ich war ein häßliches Mädchen)
- My Husband's Getting Married Today, directed by Kurt Hoffmann (West Germany, 1956, based on the novel Heute heiratet mein Mann)
- Es wird alles wieder gut, directed by Géza von Bolváry (West Germany, 1957, based on the novel Morgen ist alles besser)
- My Husband's Getting Married Today, directed by Michael Kreihsl (Austria, 2006, TV film, based on the novel Heute heiratet mein Mann)
