= The Seven Dresses of Katrin =

1954 film

- DVD Cover
- Directed by: Hans Deppe
- Written by: Gisi Gruber (novel); Johanna Sibelius; Eberhard Keindorff; Walter F. Fichelscher
- Produced by: Hans Deppe; Wilhelm Gernhardt
- Starring: Sonja Ziemann; Paul Klinger; Georg Thomalla
- Cinematography: Herbert Körner; Herbert Wellert
- Edited by: Johanna Meisel
- Music by: Heinrich Riethmüller
- Production companies: Constantin Film; Hans Deppe Film
- Distributed by: Constantin Film
- Release date: 13 August 1954
- Running time: 105 minutes
- Country: West Germany
- Language: German

The Seven Dresses of Katrin (German: Die sieben Kleider der Katrin) is a 1954 West German romantic comedy film directed by Hans Deppe and starring Sonja Ziemann, Paul Klinger, and Georg Thomalla.

It was shot at the Spandau and Tempelhof Studios in Berlin. The film's sets were designed by the art director Willi Herrmann.

== Synopsis ==
The film tells the story of a woman's life through seven dresses she wears.

== Cast ==
- Sonja Ziemann as Katrin Burian
- Paul Klinger as Dr. Peter Schörg
- Georg Thomalla as Graf Felix 'Lixi' Hohenstein
- Wolf Albach-Retty as Martin Pall
- Doris Kirchner as Franziska 'Franzi' Tompe
- Leonard Steckel as Mödel, Theater-Direktor
- Käthe Haack as Tante Therese Hensel
- Irina Garden as Ilse Heyse
- Herbert Hübner as Dr. Heyse
- Joe Furtner as Herr Tompe
- Gunnar Möller as Hans, der Flieger
- Olga Limburg
- Werner Schott as Polizeikommissar
- Kurt Vespermann as Onkel Philipp Hensel
- Axel Monjé as Ilses Verlobter
- Licci Bala as Ilona
- Grethe Weiser as Frau Dubeck
- Lori Leux
- Alexa von Porembsky
- Carl de Vogt

== Bibliography ==
- Bock, Hans-Michael; Bergfelder, Tim, eds. (2009). The Concise Cinegraph: Encyclopaedia of German Cinema. New York: Berghahn Books. ISBN 978-1-57181-655-9.
