= Arms and the Man (1958 film) =

1958 film

- Directed by: Franz Peter Wirth
- Written by: George Bernard Shaw (play); Eberhard Keindorff; Johanna Sibelius
- Based on: Arms and the Man; 1894 play by George Bernard Shaw
- Produced by: Peter Goldbaum; Harry R. Sokal
- Starring: O. W. Fischer; Liselotte Pulver; Ellen Schwiers; Jan Hendriks
- Cinematography: Klaus von Rautenfeld
- Edited by: Claus von Boro
- Music by: Franz Grothe
- Production company: Bavaria Film
- Distributed by: Bavaria Film
- Release date: 20 November 1958
- Running time: 100 minutes
- Country: West Germany
- Language: German

Arms and the Man or Heroes (German: Helden) is a 1958 West German historical comedy film directed by Franz Peter Wirth and based on the 1894 play of the same name by George Bernard Shaw.

It was nominated for the Academy Award for Best Foreign Language Film. It was also entered into the 1959 Cannes Film Festival.

== Plot ==
The film is set during the Bulgarian-Serbian War of 1885. A group of Bulgarian cavalrymen, led by the daring Lieutenant Sergius, attacks a Serbian cannon commanded by the Swiss captain Bluntschli. This seemingly suicidal attack unexpectedly ends in a Bulgarian victory because the cannon is supplied with the wrong ammunition and cannot be fired. Captain Bluntschli, forced to flee on foot, seeks refuge in the house of the Bulgarian Petkoff family, whose daughter Raina is engaged to his adversary Sergius. Raina, initially idealistic about Sergius's "great victory," becomes disillusioned after sheltering Bluntschli, realizing the harsh realities of war. Despite sympathizing with the "enemy," Raina hides Bluntschli from Bulgarian soldiers and later allows him to stay in their house.

After the war, Sergius is celebrated as a hero by the Petkoff family, especially by Raina and her mother. Raina's father, Major Petkoff, however, prefers civilian life and is indifferent to Sergius's military bravado. Meanwhile, Sergius seeks closeness with Raina, who resists exchanging her admiration for him with physical intimacy, frustrating him. The maid Louka, aspiring for social advancement, seduces Sergius, adding to the tension. Bluntschli reappears, warmly welcomed by Major Petkoff, who admires his organizational skills and asks him to handle calculations for supplying the returning Bulgarian troops. Bluntschli takes the opportunity to return the house jacket and stay close to Raina, whose feelings for him become evident. Despite Sergius's infidelity and jealousy, Bluntschli wins a duel against him, revealing his skill in fencing.

Sergius, now free to pursue Louka, shows little regret over losing Raina. Shortly after, Bluntschli discovers he has inherited several luxury hotels in Switzerland, becoming extremely wealthy. Raina's parents approve of him as an ideal husband for their daughter, who eagerly accepts the proposal.

== Cast ==
- O. W. Fischer as Hauptmann Bluntschli
- Liselotte Pulver as Raina Petkoff
- Ellen Schwiers as Louka
- Jan Hendriks as Leutnant Sergius Slivitzna
- Ljuba Welitsch as Katharina
- Kurt Kasznar as Petkoff
- Manfred Inger as Nicola
- Horst Tappert
- Hans Clarin

== Production ==
The film's sets were designed by the art director Hermann Warm. It was shot at the Bavaria Studios in Munich.

== See also ==
- List of submissions to the 31st Academy Awards for Best Foreign Language Film
- List of German submissions for the Academy Award for Best Foreign Language Film
