= Günther Anders (cinematographer) =

German cinematographer

Günther Anders (born 8 November 1908 in Berlin; died 16 September 1977 in Munich) was a German cameraman and cinematographer.

== Life ==
Anders was the son of a director of the film production company Eiko, later sales director for UFA. As early as 1918 he was appearing in child roles in silent films.

After leaving school in 1922 and completing an apprenticeship in the photographic department at UFA he trained at the State School of Phototechnics (Staatliche Hochschule für Fototechnik) in Munich. He then spent some years as an assistant to Carl Hoffmann, Karl Freund and Eugen Schüfftan. In 1934 he took full charge of the camera for the first time in Ich bin Du, a short film directed by Hoffmann.

After a considerable quantity of drama films Anders was reckoned among the top cameramen in the Third Reich. Besides his drama work he was involved in several significant propaganda films, such as Wunschkonzert and the anti-Polish production Heimkehr. On these he worked principally with the directors Karl Ritter and Gustav Ucicky. In the winter of 1944/45 he was cameraman on the last, unfinished, large-scale production of this era, Das Leben geht weiter ("Life Goes On").

In 1947 he began his post-war activity with the drama Zwischen gestern und morgen about returnees. As part of the cinema boom of the 1950s Anders received many commissions as cameraman, mostly in Austria. In 1965 he was successful in bringing the estranged brothers Attila Hörbiger and Paul Hörbiger together in front of the camera for the filming of the stage play Der Alpenkönig und der Menschenfeind, of which he was the director. His last film was in 1968.

Günther Anders was married, as his second wife, to the costumier Charlotte Flemming.

== Filmography ==
- 1935: Lessons in Love
- 1935: The Valiant Navigator
- 1935: Victoria
- 1936: The Merry Wives
- 1936: Die Hochzeitsreise
- 1936: Susanne in the Bath
- 1937: The Ruler
- 1937: Patriots
- 1937: My Son the Minister
- 1937: Unternehmen Michael
- 1937: Diamonds
- 1937: Urlaub auf Ehrenwort
- 1938: Capriccio
- 1938: Pour le Mérite
- 1939: Castles in the Air
- 1939: The Wedding Trip
- 1939: Legion Condor
- 1939: Cadets
- 1940: Wunschkonzert
- 1941: Heimkehr
- 1942: Hochzeit auf Bärenhof
- 1942: Whom the Gods Love
- 1943: Das Ferienkind
- 1944: Am Ende der Welt
- 1944: Schrammeln
- 1944: Der gebieterische Ruf
- 1944: The Heart Must Be Silent
- 1945: Das Leben geht weiter (unfinished)
- 1947: Between Yesterday and Tomorrow
- 1948: Fregola
- 1948: Ulli and Marei
- 1948: The Angel with the Trumpet
- 1948: Das Kuckucksei
- 1949: Eroica
- 1949: Bonus on Death
- 1950: Archduke Johann's Great Love
- 1951: Gateway to Peace
- 1951: A Devil of a Woman
- 1951: The Blue Star of the South
- 1951: Vienna Waltzes
- 1952: Ich hab mich so an Dich gewöhnt
- 1952: Until We Meet Again
- 1953: A Musical War of Love
- 1954: Cabaret
- 1954: Fireworks
- 1954: The Confession of Ina Kahr
- 1955: The Last Ten Days
- 1955: Island of the Dead
- 1955: A Heart Full of Music
- 1955: The Barrings
- 1955: Dunja
- 1956: Crown Prince Rudolph's Last Love
- 1956: Lügen haben hübsche Beine
- 1956: My Husband's Getting Married Today
- 1956: Drayman Henschel
- 1956: Kaiserjäger
- 1957: The Girl and the Legend
- 1957: The Unexcused Hour
- 1957: The Saint and Her Fool
- 1958: Vienna, City of My Dreams
- 1958: Heart Without Mercy
- 1958: One Should Be Twenty Again
- 1958: Stefanie
- 1958: The Priest and the Girl
- 1959: Arena of Fear
- 1959: The Beautiful Adventure
- 1960: Beloved Augustin
- 1960: A Glass of Water
- 1960: Faust
- 1960: The Haunted Castle
- 1960: Gustav Adolf's Page
- 1961: Beloved Impostor
- 1961: The Last of Mrs. Cheyney
- 1961: The Liar
- 1963: Miracle of the White Stallions
- 1963: A Nearly Decent Girl
- 1963: The House in Montevideo
- 1965: Der Alpenkönig und der Menschenfeind (also directed)
- 1965: Lumpaci the Vagabond
- 1967: Rosalinde (TV)
- 1968: A Village Romeo and Juliet (TV)
- 1968: Der Schwanensee (TV)
- 1968: Pole Poppenspäler (TV; director)

== Awards ==
- 1961: Filmband in Gold (Camera) for A Glass of Water
- 1961: Preis der deutschen Filmkritik for The Haunted Castle and A Glass of Water
- 1962: Der letzte Preis for Ukte
