= Werner Schott =

German actor

Werner Schott (20 November 1891, in Berlin – 6 September 1965) was a German actor.

== Selected filmography ==
- Gefesselt (1920) - Allan
- Das vierte Gebot (1920) - Weltpriester Eduard
- Wie Satan starb (1920)
- Golgatha (1920) - Josef
- Der verlorene Schatten (1921) - Graf Durande
- Die Schauspielerin des Kaisers (1921)
- The Daughter of the Brigadier (1922)
- König einer Nacht (1922)
- Genoveva (1922)
- Die Sportlady (1922)
- Tragedy in the House of Habsburg (1924) - Corradini
- Der Sturz ins Glück (1924)
- Das Gift der Borgia (1924)
- Luther (1928) - Johann der Beständige
- The Last Company (1930) - Biese
- The Flute Concert of Sanssouci (1930) - Frazösischer Gesandter in Dresden
- Danton (1931) - St. Just
- F.P.1 antwortet nicht (1932) - Matthias Lennartz
- Ich will Dich Liebe lehren (1933) - Der Frieseur
- William Tell (1934) - Vogt Landenberg
- The Big Chance (1934) - Hans Raschdorf, Chefingenieur
- The Four Musketeers (1934) - Hauptmann der Kompanie
- A Man Wants to Get to Germany (1934)
- The Sporck Battalion (1934) - Hauptmann Rabenhainer
- Herr Kobin geht auf Abenteuer (1934) - Baron von Dingenberg
- Oberwachtmeister Schwenke (1935)
- The Old and the Young King (1935)
- Anschlag auf Schweda (1935) - Der Zuchthausdirektor
- Henker, Frauen und Soldaten (1935)
- Ride to Freedom (1937) - Bobrikoff
- The Ways of Love Are Strange (1937) - Der General
- Pan (1937) - Der Doktor
- Mystery About Beate (1938) - Direktor Koch
- Fools in the Snow (1938) - Der Sonderbare
- You and I (1938) - Schütz
- Napoleon Is to Blame for Everything (1938) - Teilnehmer am Napoleon Kongress (uncredited)
- Dance on the Volcano (1938) - Soldat (uncredited)
- Women for Golden Hill (1938) - Flughafenkommandant
- A Prussian Love Story (1938) - Generaladjutant von Witzleben
- War es der im 3. Stock? (1938) - Professor Dachs, Chefarzt
- Bachelor's Paradise (1939) - Kapitän
- Escape in the Dark (1939)
- Robert Koch (1939) - Arzt
- The Golden Mask (1939) - Professor Torner
- Kennwort Machin (1939)
- Alarm at Station III (1939) - Polizeipräsident
- A Man Astray (1940) - Carlsson, Patterssons Sekretär
- Wunschkonzert (1940)
- Der Sündenbock (1940)
- Krach im Vorderhaus (1941) - (uncredited)
- The Great King (1942) - (uncredited)
- Melody of a Great City (1943) - Herr Petersen
- Herr Sanders lebt gefährlich (1944) - Franck, Kriminalkommissar
- Der große Preis (1944) - Staatsanwalt
- The Roedern Affair (1944) - Oberst von Sack
- Five Suspects (1950) - Kriminalkommissar Ribe (uncredited)
- The Woman from Last Night (1950)
- Not Without Gisela (1951) - Chefredakteur
- The Seven Dresses of Katrin (1954) - Polizeikommissar
- Love (1956)
- Der Würger von Schloß Blackmoor (1963)
