= Morning's at Seven (film) =

1968 film

- Directed by: Kurt Hoffmann
- Written by: Eberhard Keindorff; Johanna Sibelius
- Based on: Morning's at Seven by Eric Malpass
- Produced by: Heinz Angermeyer
- Starring: Gerlinde Locker; Peter Arens; Werner Hinz
- Cinematography: Heinz Hölscher
- Edited by: Gisela Haller
- Music by: James Last
- Production company: Independent Film
- Distributed by: Constantin Film
- Release date: 5 September 1968
- Running time: 96 minutes
- Country: West Germany
- Language: German

Morning's at Seven (German: Morgens um Sieben ist die Welt noch in Ordnung) is a 1968 West German family comedy film directed by Kurt Hoffmann and starring Gerlinde Locker, Peter Arens and Werner Hinz. It was based on the 1965 novel Morning's at Seven by the British writer Eric Malpass. A sequel When Sweet Moonlight Is Sleeping in the Hills was released the following year with much of the same cast.

It was shot at the Spandau Studios in Berlin and on location around Solingen in North Rhine-Westphalia and Großenbrode and Fehmarn on the Baltic in Schleswig-Holstein. The film's sets were designed by the art directors Isabella Schlichting and Werner Schlichting.

== Cast ==
- Archibald Eser as Gaylord
- Gerlinde Locker as May
- Peter Arens as Jocelyn
- Werner Hinz as Grandfather
- Agnes Windeck as Aunt Marigold
- Maria Körber as Rose
- Diana Körner as Becky
- Gerd Vespermann as Roberts
- Herbert Bötticher as Stan
- Rolf Zacher as Peter
- Eva Lissa as Frau Fogerty
- Gerd Lohmeyer as Willy
- Wolfgang Petry as Bert
- Lu Säuberlich as Tante Bea
- Charles Hans Vogt as Onkel Ben
- Dinah Hinz as Fräulein Marston
- Dirk Reichert as David

== Bibliography ==
- Bock, Hans-Michael & Bergfelder, Tim. The Concise CineGraph. Encyclopedia of German Cinema. Berghahn Books, 2009.
