= Mark of the Tortoise =

1964 film

- Film poster
- Directed by: Alfred Vohrer
- Screenplay by: Eberhard Keindorff; Johanna Sibelius
- Based on: Pay or Die by James Hadley Chase
- Produced by: Horst Wendlandt
- Starring: Hildegard Knef
- Cinematography: Bruno Mondi
- Edited by: Hermann Haller
- Music by: Martin Böttcher
- Production company: Rialto Film
- Release date: 23 April 1964
- Running time: 90 minutes
- Country: West Germany
- Language: German
- Budget: $375,000

Mark of the Tortoise (German: Wartezimmer zum Jenseits) is a 1964 German krimi film directed by Alfred Vohrer and starring Hildegard Knef. It is based on the novel Pay or Die by the British author James Hadley Chase.

The film was shot in studios and on location in London and Trieste.

== Cast ==
- Hildegard Knef as Lorelli
- Götz George as Donald 'Don' Micklem
- Richard Münch as Mario Orlandi di Alsconi
- Heinz Reincke as Inspektor Dickes
- Carl Lange as Crantor
- Pinkas Braun as Felix
- Adelheid Seeck as Lady Helen Bradley
- Hans Paetsch as Sir Cyrus Bradley
- Jan Hendriks as Carlos
- Klaus Kinski as Shapiro
- Hans Clarin as Harry Mason

== Production ==
Rialto Film produced a cycle of films in a uniquely West German style of crime thriller known as the kriminalfilme or krimis. Originally based in Denmark, Rialto Film made a series of these films, starting with Der Frosch mit der Maske (1959) and Der rote Kreis (1960) which were aimed at the German film market and were successes in the country's box office. Rialto created a German part of their company that was a subdivision of Constantin Film that would focus on the developing and releasing these films. A reviewer of the film in Variety commented on the krimi trend in their review of Mark of the Tortoise in 1964, saying that under the supervision of Horst Wendlandt of Rialto, the company had released 16 krimis in the last four years and "nearly all of them made money."

Mark of the Tortoise was based on the novel Pay or Die by the British author James Hadley Chase. Variety had announced the film beginning production by February 12, 1964 in Hamburg. Mark of the Tortoise was shot at Real-Film-Studios and on location in London and Trieste. Variety reported that it was made for about $375,000.

== Release and reception ==
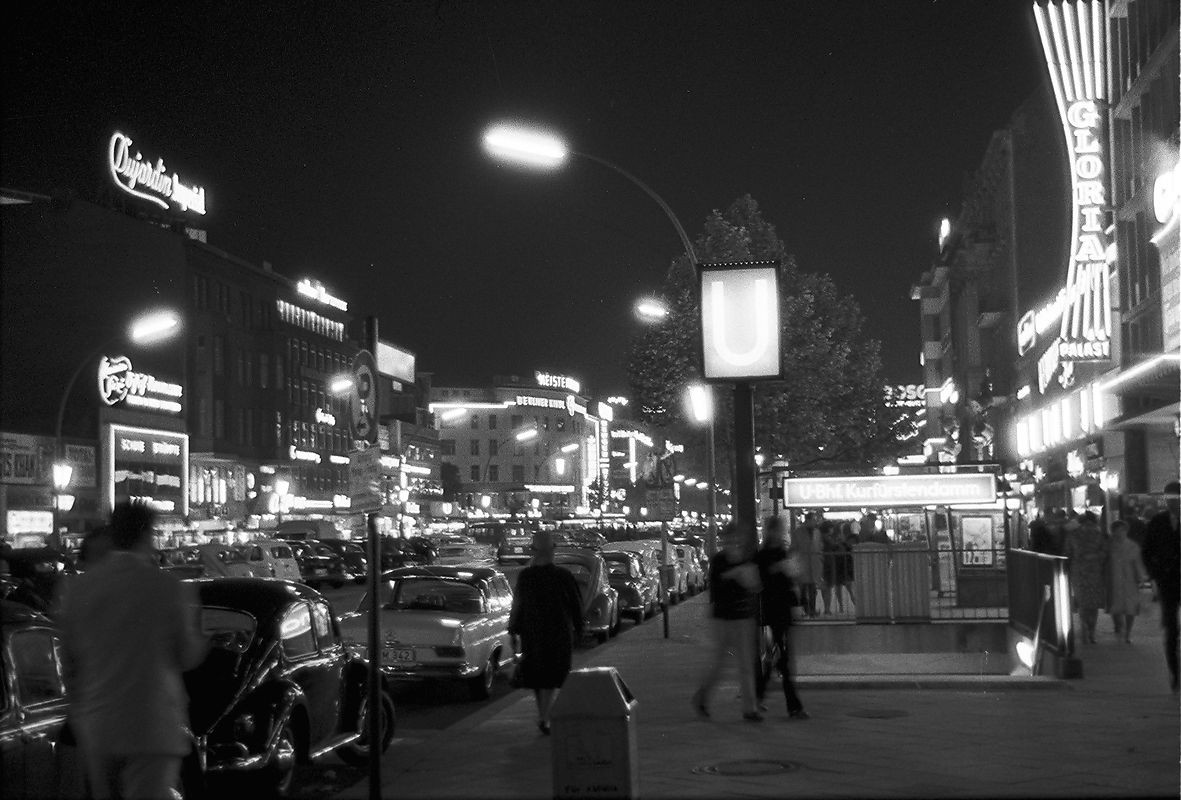
The Gloria-Palast in 1965, the year after Mark of the Tortoise premiered there.

Mark of the Tortoise was released April 23, 1964 in Stuttgart at the Gloria-Palast. The film was released on American television as Mark of the Tortoise.

In a contemporary reviews from German screenings, a reviewer from the newspaper Passauer Neue Presse complimented the cast in general and said specifically mentioned Hildegard Knef as adding her own personal touch to the a "clichéd female lead role." Reviewing the film in Berlin, "Hans." of Variety found it to be a "technically well-made, swiftly paced and expertly directed production." He said that the film has a "somewhat superficial script", he added that the producer Horst Wendlandt made sure that the films were never too long.

In the newspaper Diário de Lisboa, a reviewer complemented the cinematography and the performances by Hildegard Knef, Götz George, Richard Münch, Carl Lange, Heinz Reincke, and Pinkas Braun as standing out.

== See also ==
- Klaus Kinski filmography and discography
- List of West German films of 1964
