= Heinz Angermeyer =

German film producer

- Born: 12 September 1900; Belgershain, Saxony, German Empire
- Died: 13 March 1988 (aged 87); Munich, Bavaria, West Germany
- Occupation: Producer
- Years active: 1960-1985 (film)

Heinz Angermeyer (1909–1988) was a German film producer. Along with Kurt Hoffmann, he ran a production company Independent-Film.

== Selected filmography ==
- Agatha, Stop That Murdering! (1960)
- Stage Fright (1960)
- Snow White and the Seven Jugglers (1962)
- Gripsholm Castle (1963)
- Love Has to Be Learned (1963)
- Praetorius (1965)
- The House in Karp Lane (1965)
- Liselotte of the Palatinate (1966)
- Rheinsberg (1967)
- Glorious Times at the Spessart Inn (1967)
- Morning's at Seven (1968)
- When Sweet Moonlight Is Sleeping in the Hills (1969)
- Red Sun (1970)
- Dream City (1973)
- The Clown (1976)
- Der Sturz (1979)
- Angels of Iron (1981)

== Bibliography ==
- Tim Bergfelder, Erica Carter & Deniz Göktürk. The German Cinema Book. BFI, 2002.
