= Until We Meet Again (1952 film) =

1952 film

- Directed by: Gustav Ucicky
- Written by: Johanna Sibelius; Eberhard Keindorff
- Produced by: Luggi Waldleitner
- Starring: Maria Schell; O. W. Fischer; Karl Ludwig Diehl
- Cinematography: Günther Anders
- Edited by: Elisabeth Kleinert-Neumann
- Music by: Lothar Brühne
- Production companies: Roxy Film; Gloria Film
- Distributed by: Gloria Film
- Release date: 7 October 1952
- Running time: 84 minutes
- Country: West Germany
- Language: German

Until We Meet Again (German: Bis wir uns wiedersehn) is a 1952 West German romantic drama film directed by Gustav Ucicky and starring Maria Schell, O. W. Fischer, and Karl Ludwig Diehl. It was shot at the Göttingen Studios and on location at Lake Como, Slough in England, Guatemala and Zweibrücken. The film's sets were designed by the art directors Hans Ledersteger and Ernst Richter.

== Cast ==
- Maria Schell as Pamela
- O. W. Fischer as Paul Mayrhöfer
- Karl Ludwig Diehl as Prof. Stauffer
- Kurt Meisel as Willy Wagner
- Margarete Haagen as Frau Wagner
- Grete Reinwald as Pflegerin
- Ingrid Lutz as Tina
- Werner Fuetterer as Bernard, Modesalonbesitzer
- Josef Sieber as Kriminalkommissar
- Eugen Dumont
- Gunnar Möller as Pamelas Freund
- Hugo Lindinger

== Bibliography ==
- Bock, Hans-Michael; Bergfelder, Tim, eds. (2009). The Concise Cinegraph: Encyclopaedia of German Cinema. New York: Berghahn Books. ISBN 978-1-57181-655-9.
