= Gateway to Peace =

1951 film

- Directed by: Wolfgang Liebeneiner
- Written by: Leopoldine Kytka
- Produced by: Leopoldine Kytka
- Starring: Paul Hartmann; Vilma Degischer; Hilde Krahl
- Cinematography: Günther Anders; Willi Sohm
- Edited by: Arnfried Heyne
- Music by: Bert Rudolf
- Production company: Lambach-Film
- Distributed by: Ring-Film
- Release date: 19 March 1951
- Running time: 98 minutes
- Country: Austria
- Language: German

Gateway to Peace (German: Das Tor zum Frieden) is a 1951 Austrian drama film directed by Wolfgang Liebeneiner and starring Paul Hartmann, Vilma Degischer and Hilde Krahl.

The film's sets were designed by the art director Fritz Jüptner-Jonstorff.

== Cast ==
- Paul Hartmann as Paul Dressler, ungarischer Gutsbesitzer
- Vilma Degischer as Elisabeth Dressler
- Michael Tellering as Martin - beider Sohn
- Ida Krottendorf as Luise - beider Tochter
- Hilde Krahl as Maria Gebhart, Konzertsängerin
- Walter Ladengast as Thomas
- Günter Krula as Der kleine Niki - beider Sohn
- Klaus Dorneich as Der große Niki - beider Sohn
- Kurt Bülau as Toni Neubauer, Baumeister
- Gisa Wurm as Mutter Thomas
- Hans Franz Pokorny as Moosbauer
- Maria von Höslin as Die Moosbäuerin
- Jutta Bornemann as Magd Klara
- Alfred Schnayder as Organist
- Pater Beda as Pater

== Bibliography ==
- Fritsche, Maria. Homemade Men In Postwar Austrian Cinema: Nationhood, Genre and Masculinity . Berghahn Books, 2013.
