= Music by Night =

1953 film

- Directed by: Kurt Hoffmann
- Written by: Eberhard Keindorff; Johanna Sibelius
- Produced by: Fritz Thiery
- Starring: Paul Hubschmid; Gertrud Kückelmann; Curd Jürgens
- Cinematography: Franz Koch
- Edited by: Gertrud Hinz-Nischwitz
- Music by: Franz Grothe
- Production company: Helios-Filmproduktion
- Distributed by: Schorcht Filmverleih
- Release date: 17 July 1953
- Running time: 89 minutes
- Country: West Germany
- Language: German

Music by Night (German: Musik bei Nacht) is a 1953 German comedy film directed by Kurt Hoffmann and starring Paul Hubschmid, Gertrud Kückelmann and Curd Jürgens. It was shot at the Bavaria Studios in Munich. The film's sets were designed by the art director Robert Herlth.

== Cast ==
- Paul Hubschmid as Robert Ellin
- Gertrud Kückelmann as Maria Bruck
- Curd Jürgens as Hans Kersten
- Judith Holzmeister as Gloria Ellin
- Günther Lüders as George Webb
- Rudolf Vogel as Joseph, Oberkellner
- Hans Reiser as Teddy Taylor
- Rudolf Reiff as Dr. Reissner, Verleger
- Harry Hertzsch as Diener John
- Heinz-Leo Fischer as Manager Miller

== Bibliography ==
- Bock, Hans-Michael & Bergfelder, Tim. The Concise CineGraph. Encyclopedia of German Cinema. Berghahn Books, 2009.
