= Long Legs, Long Fingers =

1966 West German comedy crime film

- Directed by: Alfred Vohrer
- Written by: Peter Lambda; Eberhard Keindorff; Johanna Sibelius
- Produced by: Artur Brauner; Götz Dieter Wulf
- Starring: Senta Berger; Joachim Fuchsberger; Martin Held
- Cinematography: Karl Löb
- Edited by: Jutta Hering
- Music by: Martin Böttcher
- Production company: CCC Film
- Distributed by: Nora Film
- Release date: 26 August 1966
- Running time: 92 minutes
- Country: West Germany
- Language: German

Long Legs, Long Fingers (German: Lange Beine – lange Finger) is a 1966 West German comedy crime film directed by Alfred Vohrer and starring Senta Berger, Joachim Fuchsberger and Martin Held. It was shot at the Spandau Studios in Berlin and on location at Charlottenburg Palace and Caesarea in Israel. The film's sets were designed by the art directors Isabella and Werner Schlichting.

== Synopsis ==
Baron Holberg takes pride in his family's long history as cat burglars as pickpockets and his daughter Doris is continuing in the tradition. However she meets the English lawyer Robert Hammond. Her father attempts to keep them apart, but she heads to London, to work as a model.

== Cast ==
- Senta Berger as Doris Holberg
- Joachim Fuchsberger as Robert Hammond
- Martin Held as Baron Holberg
- Irene von Meyendorff as Lady Hammond
- James Robertson Justice as Sir Hammond
- Hanns Lothar as Emile Cavin
- Helga Sommerfeld as Sarah Hammond
- Walter Wilz as Sammy Snapper
- Tilo von Berlepsch as Prosecutor
- Lia Eibenschütz as Cavin's Mutter
- Alexander Engel as Arzt
- Cora Roberts as Model
- Friedrich Schoenfelder as General
- Rudolf Schündler as Inspektor
- Hilde Sessak as Wärterin
- Heinz Spitzner as Polizist
- Eduard Wandrey as Gerichtsvorsitzender
- Zeev Berlinsky as Diamantenhehler Snapper

== Bibliography ==
- Bock, Hans-Michael & Bergfelder, Tim. The Concise CineGraph. Encyclopedia of German Cinema. Berghahn Books, 2009.
