= Jacqueline (1959 film) =

1959 film

- Directed by: Wolfgang Liebeneiner
- Written by: Jochen Huth; Eberhard Keindorff; Johanna Sibelius
- Produced by: Eberhard Klagemann
- Starring: Johanna von Koczian; Walther Reyer; Götz George
- Cinematography: Günther Senftleben
- Edited by: Margot von Schlieffen
- Music by: Franz Grothe
- Production company: UFA
- Distributed by: UFA
- Release date: 17 September 1959
- Running time: 104 minutes
- Country: West Germany
- Language: German

Jacqueline is a 1959 West German comedy film directed by Wolfgang Liebeneiner and starring Johanna von Koczian, Walther Reyer and Götz George. George won a German Film Award for best newcomer for his performance.

It was shot at the Tempelhof Studios and on location in Munich and Vienna. The film's sets were designed by the art director Werner Schlichting.

== Cast ==
- Johanna von Koczian as Jacqueline
- Walther Reyer as Paul Büttner
- Götz George as Gustav Bäumler
- Hans Söhnker as Zander, Theaterdirektor
- Eva Maria Meineke as Charlotte Christens
- Gretl Schörg a Frau Burg
- Alexa von Porembsky as Frau Klose
- Walter Ladengast as Nöll, Dramaturg
- Erik Frey as Bolingbroke
- Alexander Hunzinger as Wirt
- Horst Tappert as Haack, Journalist
- Hans Pfleger as Bonte
- Paula Braend as Fischfrau
- Ernst Brasch as Portier
- Mady Dettmann as Gemüsefrau
- Herta Fahrenkrog as Junge Frau
- Otto Friebel as Kaufhausbode
- Franz Loskarn as Türöffner
- Paula Menari as Garderobefrau
- Gisela Reiche as Sekretärin im Theater

== Bibliography ==
- Bock, Hans-Michael & Bergfelder, Tim. The Concise CineGraph. Encyclopedia of German Cinema. Berghahn Books, 2009.
