= My Husband's Getting Married Today =

1956 film

- Directed by: Kurt Hoffmann
- Written by: Annemarie Selinko (novel); Eberhard Keindorff; Johanna Sibelius
- Produced by: Georg Witt
- Starring: Liselotte Pulver; Johannes Heesters; Paul Hubschmid
- Cinematography: Günther Anders
- Edited by: Gertrud Hinz-Nischwitz
- Music by: Hans-Martin Majewski
- Production company: Georg Witt-Film
- Distributed by: Constantin Film
- Release date: 30 August 1956
- Running time: 91 minutes
- Country: West Germany
- Language: German

My Husband's Getting Married Today (German: Heute heiratet mein Mann) is a 1956 West German comedy film directed by Kurt Hoffmann and starring Liselotte Pulver, Johannes Heesters and Paul Hubschmid.

It was shot at the Bavaria Studios near Munich and in Hamburg. The film's sets were designed by the art director Robert Herlth.

== Cast ==
- Liselotte Pulver as Thesi Petersen
- Johannes Heesters as Robert Petersen
- Paul Hubschmid as Georg Lindberg
- Gustav Knuth as Karl Nielsen
- Charles Regnier as Niki Springer
- Gundula Korte as Karin Nielsen
- Eva Maria Meineke as Betsy
- Ingrid van Bergen as Ulla Radtke, Mannequin
- Ernst Waldow as Direktor Wilhelm Anders
- Lina Carstens as Tante Erna
- Margarete Haagen as Schwester Theophenia
- Werner Finck as Dr. Agartz, Zahnarzt
- Fritz Hinz-Fabricius as Chefarzt des Krankenhauses
- Herta Saal as Frau Nielsen
- Carla Rust

== Bibliography ==
- Robert, Reimer, & Reimer, Carol. The A to Z of German Cinema. Scarecrow Press, 2010.
