= Captive Soul =

1952 film

- Directed by: Hans Wolff
- Written by: Eberhard Keindorff; Johanna Sibelius
- Produced by: Hermann Schwerin; Herbert Sennewald
- Starring: Attila Hörbiger; Anne-Marie Blanc; Adrian Hoven
- Cinematography: Helmut Ashley
- Edited by: Hermann Leitner
- Music by: Theo Mackeben
- Production company: Ferro-Film
- Distributed by: Europa-Filmverleih
- Release date: 11 January 1952
- Running time: 96 minutes
- Country: West Germany
- Language: German

Captive Soul (German: Gefangene Seele) is a 1952 West German drama film directed by Hans Wolff and starring Attila Hörbiger, Anne-Marie Blanc and Adrian Hoven. It was shot at the Bavaria Studios and on location in Munich and Bayreuth. The film's sets were designed by the art director Max Mellin.

== Synopsis ==
After being badly injured, a female dancer eventually recovers after falling in love.

== Cast ==
- Attila Hörbiger as Professor Berger
- Eva Bajor as Viola Berger, Tänzerin
- Adrian Hoven as Antonio Vendramin
- Anne-Marie Blanc as Helene
- Hedwig Bleibtreu as Martha
- Heinrich Gretler as Martin Berger, Pfarrer
- Charles Regnier as Gregor Palinin
- Alfred Neugebauer as Josef Greiner
- Ernst Fritz Fürbringer as Prof. Altmann
- Paul Albert Krumm as Paul
- Grete Reinwald as Blinde Frau
- Walter Janssen
- Edith Schultze-Westrum
- Erica Beer

== Bibliography ==
- Hans-Michael Bock and Tim Bergfelder. The Concise Cinegraph: An Encyclopedia of German Cinema. Berghahn Books, 2009.
