= Tomorrow It Will Be Better =

Morgen gaat het beter
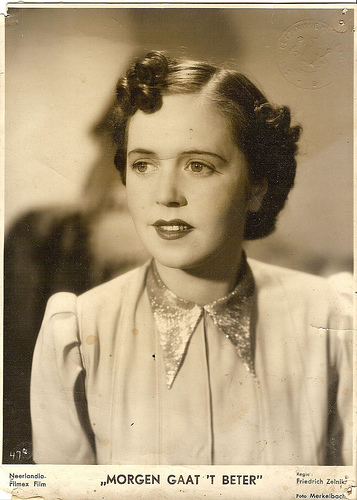
- Dutch: Morgen gaat het beter
- Directed by: Frederic Zelnik
- Written by: As Bruynse; Kees Bruynse
- Based on: Tomorrow is Another Day by Annemarie Selinko
- Release date: 23 February 1939
- Running time: 101 minutes
- Country: Netherlands
- Language: Dutch

Tomorrow It Will Be Better (Dutch: Morgen gaat het beter) is a 1939 Dutch film directed by Frederic Zelnik.

== Cast ==
- Lily Bouwmeester as Willy Verhulst, het schoolmeisje
- Paul Steenbergen as Alfred Herder, programmaleider van radio-omroep
- Theo Frenkel Jr. as Hans Daldrop
- Bob De Lange
- Kommer Kleyn
- Aaf Bouber
- Chris Baay
- Ko Arnoldi
- Mien Duymaer van Twist
- Louis Gimberg
- Guus Weitzel
- Joke Bosch

== See also ==
- Everything Will Be Better in the Morning (1948)
