= Herbert Trantow =

German composer and pianist (1903–1993)

- Born: 19 September 1903; Dresden, Saxony, German Empire
- Died: 8 January 1993 (aged 89); Berlin, Brandenburg, Germany
- Occupation: Composer
- Years active: 1944–1968 (film)

Herbert Trantow (1903–1993) was a German composer of film scores, active during the postwar era. Before 1950 he worked for DEFA in East Germany, but then worked exclusively in the West. He was the father of the actress Cordula Trantow.

== Selected filmography ==
- Wozzeck (1947)
- Girls Behind Bars (1949)
- Five Suspects (1950)
- A Rare Lover (1950)
- The Staircase (1950)
- The Sinful Border (1951)
- Shadow over the Islands (1952)
- Towers of Silence (1952)
- Big City Secret (1952)
- A Thousand Red Roses Bloom (1952)
- All Clues Lead to Berlin (1952)
- Come Back (1953)
- Annaluise and Anton (1953)
- On the Reeperbahn at Half Past Midnight (1954)
- Love Without Illusions (1955)
- I Was an Ugly Girl (1955)
- Sacred Lie (1955)
- The Story of Anastasia (1956)
- The Night of the Storm (1957)
- Heaven, Love and Twine (1960)
- Until Money Departs You (1960)
- Lana, Queen of the Amazons (1964)

== Bibliography ==
- Fritsche, Maria. Homemade Men in Postwar Austrian Cinema: Nationhood, Genre and Masculinity. Berghahn Books, 2013.
