= The Blue Star of the South =

1951 film

- Directed by: Wolfgang Liebeneiner
- Written by: Theodor Ottawa; Heinrich Rumpff (novel)
- Produced by: Karl Ehrlich
- Starring: Viktor de Kowa; Gustav Knuth; Gretl Schörg
- Cinematography: Günther Anders
- Music by: Franz Grothe; Hans-Martin Majewski
- Production company: Vindobona-Filmproduktion
- Distributed by: Schorcht Filmverleih
- Release date: 22 December 1951
- Running time: 99 minutes
- Country: Austria
- Language: German

The Blue Star of the South (German: Der blaue Stern des Südens) is a 1951 Austrian comedy film directed by Wolfgang Liebeneiner and starring Viktor de Kowa, Gustav Knuth and Gretl Schörg. It was shot at the Bavaria Studios in Munich and on location in Hamburg and Paris. The film's sets were designed by the art director Ernst H. Albrecht.

== Cast ==
- Viktor de Kowa as Ivo
- Gustav Knuth as Bruck
- Gretl Schörg as Yella
- Ernst Fritz Fürbringer as Niccolini
- Charlott Daudert as Sonja
- Ernst Waldow as Kriminalrat Dr. Klein
- Hanna Ralph as Oberin Madeleine
- Paula Braend as Frau Murtus
- Katharina Mayberg as Nelitze
- Michael Tellering as Frisco-Jim
- Malte Jaeger as Marcel, ein Apache
- Harald Mannl as Meyrink

== Bibliography ==
- Fritsche, Maria. Homemade Men in Postwar Austrian Cinema: Nationhood, Genre and Masculinity. Berghahn Books, 2013.
