= Liselotte Malkowsky =

German singer, actress

- Born: 9 October 1913; Hannover, German Empire
- Died: 16 February 1965 (aged 51); Hannover, West Germany
- Occupation(s): Singer, actress

Liselotte Malkowsky (9 October 1913 – 16 February 1965) was a German singer, actress, and cabaret artist.

Malkowsky appeared in 1950s German films as a cabaret singer, and released a number of records, including a 1949 recording of Charles Trenet's song "La Mer" which enjoyed a certain popularity in Germany.

== Selected filmography ==
- The Allure of Danger (1950)
- A Heidelberg Romance (1951)
- The Thief of Bagdad (1952)
- Homesick for You (1952)
- On the Reeperbahn at Half Past Midnight (1954)
- Sacred Lie (1954)
- The Big Star Parade (1954)

== Selected discography ==
- Unter 1000 Laternen
- Das Herz von St. Pauli
- Matrosen Brauchen Liebe
- In der Bar "Zum gold'nen Anker" (Ja so ist das mit der Liebe)
