= Alexa von Porembsky =

German actress (1906–1981)

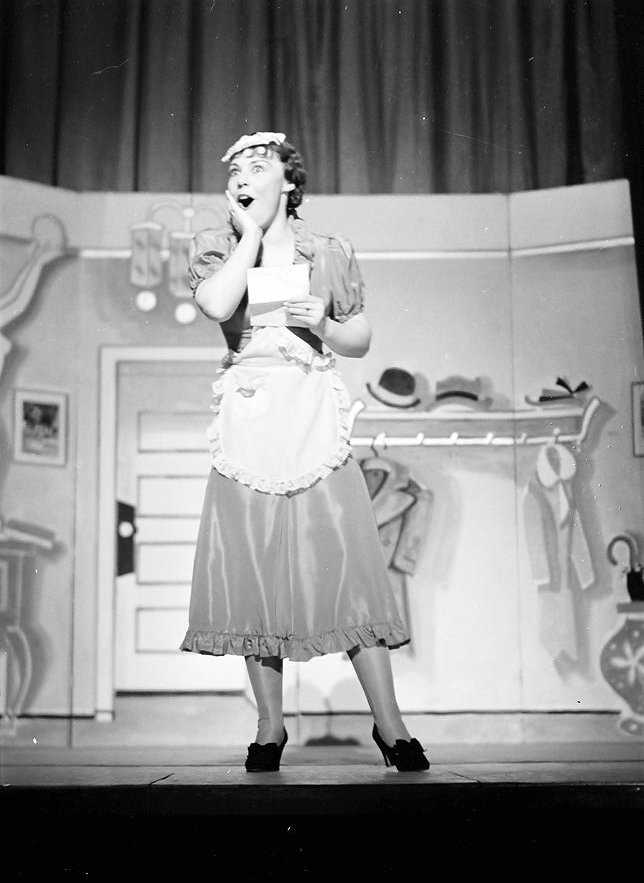
- Alexa von Porembsky in 1936
- Born: 5 June 1906; Sopron, Austria-Hungary
- Died: 18 August 1981 (aged 75); West Berlin, West Germany
- Occupation: Actress

Alexa von Porembsky (5 June 1906 - 18 August 1981) was a Hungarian-born German actress.

== Selected filmography ==
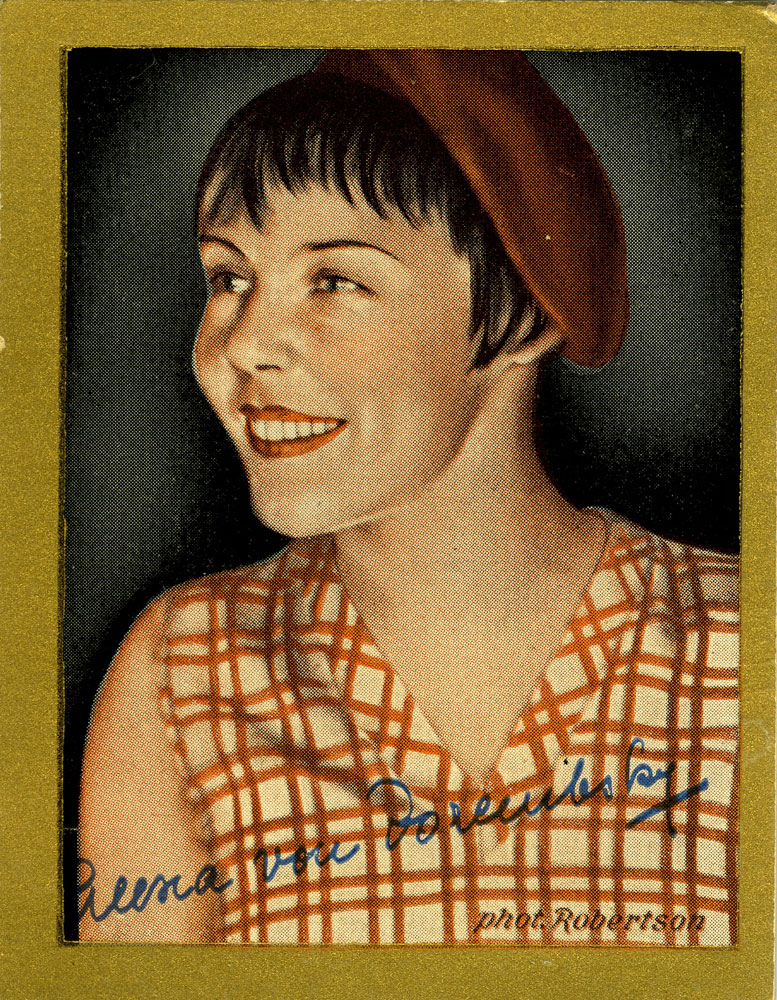
Portrayal of Porembsky on a promotional poster for Gold Saba (1933)

- Leontine's Husbands (1928)
- Woman in the Moon (1929) - Eine Veilchenverkäuferin
- Road to Rio (1931) - Die Unerfahrene
- Zimmer 12 a (1931)
- Wrong Number, Miss (1932) - Telefonistin
- The Ladies Diplomat (1932)
- The Cheeky Devil (1932) - Annette
- The Tsar's Diamond (1932) - Prinzessin Eudoxia
- Heinz in the Moon (1934) - Emma, Dienstmädchen von Ass
- The Cossack and the Nightingale (1935) - Nina, Vera's Maid
- Der Außenseiter (1935) - Amanda
- Woman's Love—Woman's Suffering (1937) - Frieda, Zimmermädchen
- The Model Husband (1937) - Mary
- The Girl with a Good Reputation (1938) - Bianca
- Scheidungsreise (1938) - Paula Hitze
- The Leghorn Hat (1939) - Clara
- Salonwagen E 417 (1939) - Ellen
- Spähtrupp Hallgarten (1941) - Toni
- I Entrust My Wife to You (1943) - Dienstmädchen
- Light of Heart (1943) - Frl. Assmann
- The Appeal to Conscience (1949) - Hörspielsprechen
- Don't Play with Love (1949) - Frau Pleßmann
- How Do We Tell Our Children? (1949)
- Der Posaunist (1949) - Susanne Taller, Soubrette
- When Men Cheat (1950)
- Not Without Gisela (1951) - Lottchen Zwieback
- At the Well in Front of the Gate (1952) - Gerti - Kellnerin
- Josef the Chaste (1953) - Lotte Müller
- Mailman Mueller (1953)
- The Seven Dresses of Katrin (1954)
- King Thrushbeard (1954) - Marktfrau
- Captain Wronski (1954)
- Roman eines Frauenarztes (1954) - Babette
- Der Froschkönig (1954) - Spielfrau Mathilde
- Doctor Solm (1955) - Schwester Franziska
- I Was an Ugly Girl (1955) - Frau Howald
- Du mein stilles Tal (1955) - Dienstmädchen
- Das Sandmännchen (1955)
- The Three from the Filling Station (1955)
- Alibi (1955) - Hausangestellte Maria
- Fruit Without Love (1956) - Anna
- The Road to Paradise (1956)
- Black Forest Melody (1956)
- Das Sonntagskind (1956) - Kundin im Metzgerladen
- Musikparade (1956) - Agathe
- Was die Schwalbe sang (1956) - Dame im Sendesaal
- Stresemann (1957) - Mme. Leger
- The Night of the Storm (1957) - Emmy
- Mischief in Wonderland (1957)
- Europas neue Musikparade 1958 (1957)
- Ferien auf Immenhof (1957) - Frau Rehmann
- It Happened Only Once (1958) - Mutter Schröder
- Das verbotene Paradies (1958) - Frau Dettmann
- Kleine Leute mal ganz groß (1958) - Ute Krüger
- Kriegsgericht (1959)
- For Love and Others (1959) - Jutta Pohl, Straßenmädchen
- Jacqueline (1959) - Frau Klose
- Adorable Arabella (1959)
- The Last Witness (1960) - Sekretärin
- Zu jung für die Liebe? (1961) - Lina
- Via Mala (1961) - Wirtin Gumpers
- Kohlhiesels Töchter (1962)

== Bibliography ==
- Jung, Uli & Schatzberg, Walter. Beyond Caligari: The Films of Robert Wiene. Berghahn Books, 1999.
