= Curt Lucas =

German actor (1888–1960)

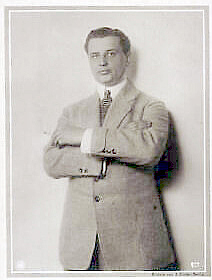
- Lucas, ca. 1920
- Born: 20 January 1888; Golzow, German Empire
- Died: 12 September 1960 (aged 72); Berlin-Wilmersdorf, West Germany
- Other names: Kurt Lucas
- Occupation: Actor
- Years active: 1906–1960

Curt Lucas (20 January 1888 – 12 September 1960) was a German stage, film and voice actor.

== Partial filmography ==
- Wie das Schicksal spielt (1920) - Dr. Heinrich Jessen - Thoras Verlobter
- A Shot at Dawn (1932) - Holzknecht
- A Door Opens (1933) - Martin Fichtner, sein Kompagnon
- Gold (1934) - (uncredited)
- Herr Kobin geht auf Abenteuer (1934) - Kriminalrat Winkelmann
- Madrigal (1935)
- Augustus the Strong (1936) - Graf Hoym
- A Doctor of Conviction (1936) - Staatsanwalt
- Moral (1936) - Direktor Bollandt
- Truxa (1937) - Jimmy, Garvins Assistenz
- The Glass Ball (1937) - Diener
- Unter Ausschluß der Öffentlichkeit (1937) - Staatsanwalt
- Mit versiegelter Order (1938) - Batscheff
- Ich verweigere die Aussage (1939) - Der Staatsanwalt
- The Fox of Glenarvon (1940) - Bankier Beverly
- Charivan (1941) - Bachmann
- Ich klage an (1941) - Sanitätsrat Klapper
- The Thing About Styx (1942) - Jules Stone
- Das Leben geht weiter (1945)
- Briefträger Müller (1953)
- I Was an Ugly Girl (1955) - Diener Franz
- Ein Mädchen aus Flandern (1956)
- Liane, Jungle Goddess (1956) - Ship's Captain
- Mazurka der Liebe (1957) - Bürgermeister

== Bibliography ==
- Bach, Steven. Marlene Dietrich: Life and Legend. University of Minnesota Press, 2011.
- Fox, Jo. Film propaganda in Britain and Nazi Germany: World War II Cinema. Berg, 2007.
