= Diana Körner =

German actress (born 1944)

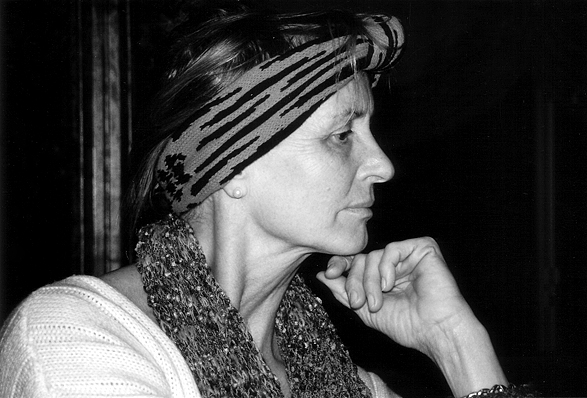
- Born: 24 September 1944 (age 81); Wolmirsleben, Germany
- Occupation: Actress
- Years active: 1967–present

Diana Körner (born 24 September 1944) is a German actress. Outside Germany she is known for her brief appearance as Lieschen in Stanley Kubrick's film Barry Lyndon.

== Selected filmography ==
- Creature with the Blue Hand (1967), as Myrna Emerson
- Morning's at Seven (1968), as Becky
- On the Reeperbahn at Half Past Midnight (1969), as Karin Lauritz
- When Sweet Moonlight Is Sleeping in the Hills (1969), as Becky
- When You're With Me (1970), as Susi
- Red Sun (1970), as Christine
- Die tollkühnen Penner (1971), as Anne
- Was wissen Sie von Titipu? (1972), as Yum-Yum
- The Flying Classroom (1973), as Schwester Beate
- Der Stechlin (1975, TV miniseries), as Armgard
- Barry Lyndon (1975), as Lieschen
- Potato Fritz (1976), as Martha Comstock
- Ways in the Night (1979), as Friedrich's fiancé
- Derrick - Season 7, Episode 2: "Unstillbarer Hunger" (1980, TV), as Helga Wichmann
- Derrick - Season 9, Episode 1: "Eine Rose im Müll" (1982, TV), as Elena Grobmüller
- Bas-Boris Bode (1985, TV miniseries), as Annette Bode
- Orchideen des Wahnsinns (1986), as Vera
- Liebling Kreuzberg - Season 2/3 (1988–1994, TV series), as Prosecutor Rosemarie Monk
- Neuner (1990)
- Moving (1991), as Hoffmann
- Nicht von schlechten Eltern (1993–1995, TV series), as Rita Zell
- Der Bulle von Tölz (1996–2002, TV series), as Prosecutor Zirner
- Samt und Seide (2000–2005, TV series), as Hedda Althofer
- Forsthaus Falkenau (2002–2006, TV series), as Dr. Annegret Richter
