= Heintje: A Heart Goes on a Journey =

1969 film

- Directed by: Werner Jacobs
- Written by: Eberhard Keindorff; Johanna Sibelius
- Produced by: Heinz Willeg
- Starring: Heintje Simons; Heinz Reincke
- Cinematography: Heinz Hölscher
- Edited by: Hermann Haller
- Music by: Raimund Rosenberger
- Production company: Terra-Filmkunst
- Distributed by: Constantin Film
- Release date: 26 August 1969 (West Germany)
- Running time: 104 min
- Country: West Germany
- Language: German

Heintje: A Heart Goes on a Journey (German: Heintje - Ein Herz geht auf Reisen) is a 1969 West German musical film directed by Werner Jacobs and starring Heintje Simons, Heinz Reincke and Gerlinde Locker.

== Cast ==
- Heintje Simons: Heinz 'Heintje' Gruber
- Heinz Reincke: Alfred Teichmann
- Gerlinde Locker: Hanna Schwarz
- Solvi Stubing: Gerdi Weber
- Ralf Wolter: Harry
- Mogens von Gadow: Hugo Neubert
- Karin Field: Else
- Sieghardt Rupp: Günter Schelle
- Dagmar Altrichter: Monika Klausen
- Peter W. Staub: Wache
- Hans Terofal: Rudi
- Edith Hancke: Lieschen
- Konrad Georg: Polizei-Inspektor
- Rudolf Schündler: Rektor Neumann
