= Kurt Schulz (cinematographer) =

German cinematographer

- Born: 14 February 1912; Berlin; German Empire
- Died: 28 May 1957 (aged 45); West Berlin
- Occupation: Cinematographer
- Years active: 1933 - 1956

Kurt Schulz (1913–1957) was a German cinematographer.

== Selected filmography ==
=== Cinematographer ===
- Hotel Sacher (1939)
- A Salzburg Comedy (1943)
- The Black Robe (1944)
- Young Hearts (1944)
- No Place for Love (1947)
- Thank You, I'm Fine (1948)
- Everything Will Be Better in the Morning (1948)
- Nothing But Coincidence (1949)
- By a Nose (1949)
- One Night Apart (1950)
- The Black Forest Girl (1950)
- The Heath Is Green (1951)
- Dance Into Happiness (1951)
- The Land of Smiles (1952)
- Mikosch Comes In (1952)
- At the Well in Front of the Gate (1952)
- Mailman Mueller (1953)
- When The Village Music Plays on Sunday Nights (1953)
- When the White Lilacs Bloom Again (1953)
- Hooray, It's a Boy! (1953)
- On the Reeperbahn at Half Past Midnight (1954)
- The Gypsy Baron (1954)
- Emil and the Detectives (1954)
- Yes, Yes, Love in Tyrol (1955)
- Charley's Aunt (1956)
- Black Forest Melody (1956)
- Das Sonntagskind (1956)

=== Assistant Camera Operator ===
- The Merry Heirs (1933)
- Triumph of the Will (1935)
- Hokum (1936)
- Heimweh (1937)
- Anna Favetti (1938)
- Three Fathers for Anna (1939)
- Sensationsprozess Casilla (1939)
- A Foreign Affair (1948)
