= Agnes Windeck =

German actress (1888–1975)

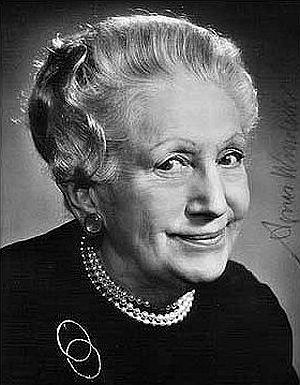
- Born: Agnes Sophie Albertine Windel; 27 March 1888; Hamburg, German Empire
- Died: 28 September 1975 (aged 87); West Berlin, West Germany
- Other name: Anni Windel
- Occupation: Actress
- Years active: 1904–1973

Agnes Windeck (German: [ˈaɡnɛs ˈvɪnˌdɛk]; 27 March 1888 – 28 September 1975) was a German theatre and film actress. She appeared in more than 50 films between 1939 and 1973. She was born in Hamburg and started her career at the Deutsches Schauspielhaus in 1904. She later worked as a teacher at the drama school of the Deutsches Theater in Berlin. In the 1930s, she began to play minor roles in several films but it was not until she was in her seventies when she became a popular character actress of West German cinema and television.

== Filmography ==
| Year | Title | Role | Notes |
|---|---|---|---|
| 1939 | The Merciful Lie | Margherita | |
| 1941 | The Way to Freedom | Baronin von Blossin | |
| 1941 | U-Boote westwärts! | Frau von Benedikt | |
| 1941 | Annelie | Schwester Martha | |
| 1942 | The Great Love | Hannas Mutter | |
| 1943 | Back Then | Gast beim Abendempfang | Uncredited |
| 1945 | The Years Pass | Fau Mathilde Kersten | |
| 1948 | Street Acquaintances | Krankenschwester | |
| 1948 | Und wieder 48 | | |
| 1950 | The Council of the Gods | Frau Mauch | |
| 1950 | Three Girls Spinning | Wirtschafterin | |
| 1953 | The Uncle from America | Telefonpartner in England | Uncredited |
| 1953 | Such a Charade | Frau Angelroth | |
| 1953 | Christina | Luise, Frau des Notars | |
| 1955 | How Do I Become a Film Star? | Frau von Klagemann | |
| 1956 | The Trapp Family | Äbtissin | |
| 1957 | ...und die Liebe lacht dazu | Haushälterin | |
| 1957 | Banktresor 713 | Ältere Dame | |
| 1957 | Vater sein dagegen sehr | Fürsorgerin | |
| 1957 | Immer wenn der Tag beginnt | Frl. Richter - Zimmervermieterin | |
| 1958 | The Copper | Mutter Schmitz | |
| 1958 | A Time to Love and a Time to Die | Frau Witte | |
| 1959 | Lockvogel der Nacht | Marions Mutter | |
| 1959 | Liebe auf krummen Beinen | Frau von Quernheim | |
| 1959 | Peter Shoots Down the Bird | Rose | |
| 1959 | The Ideal Woman | Frau Jungk | |
| 1959 | Arzt ohne Gewissen | Jane | |
| 1962 | The Constant Wife | Frau Professor Dietz | |
| 1962 | Only a Woman | Wanda, Housekeeper | |
| 1963 | Love Has to Be Learned | | Cameo |
| 1963 | The Squeaker | Mrs. Nancy Mulford | |
| 1963 | The Mouse on the Moon | Großherzogin Gloriana XIII. | German Version |
| 1963 | My Daughter and I | Frau Winkler | |
| 1963 | The V.I.P.s | Herzogin von Brighton | German Version |
| 1963 | Scotland Yard Hunts Dr. Mabuse | Gwendolyn Tern | |
| 1963 | Gripshom Castle | Frau Kremser | |
| 1966 | The Hunchback of Soho | Lady Marjorie Perkins | |
| 1966-1971 | Die Unverbesserlichen | Omimi Köpcke | TV Series, 6 episodes |
| 1967 | Rheinsberg | Frau Knappcke | |
| 1968 | The Hound of Blackwood Castle | Lady Agathy Beverton | |
| 1968 | Morning's at Seven | Aunt Marigold | |
| 1969 | Dr. Fabian: Laughing Is the Best Medicine | Thete Nachtigall | |
| 1970 | Gentlemen in White Vests | Elisabeth Zänker | |
| 1970 | Heintje - Einmal wird die Sonne wieder scheinen | Frau von Schleinitz | |
| 1971 | Hurra, wir sind mal wieder Junggesellen! | Tante Agathe | |
| 1972 | The Heath Is Green | Frau von Meltendorf | |
| 1973 | Old Barge, Young Love | Henriette Kopisch | |
