= Andreas Blum =

Swiss journalist and actor (1936–2024)

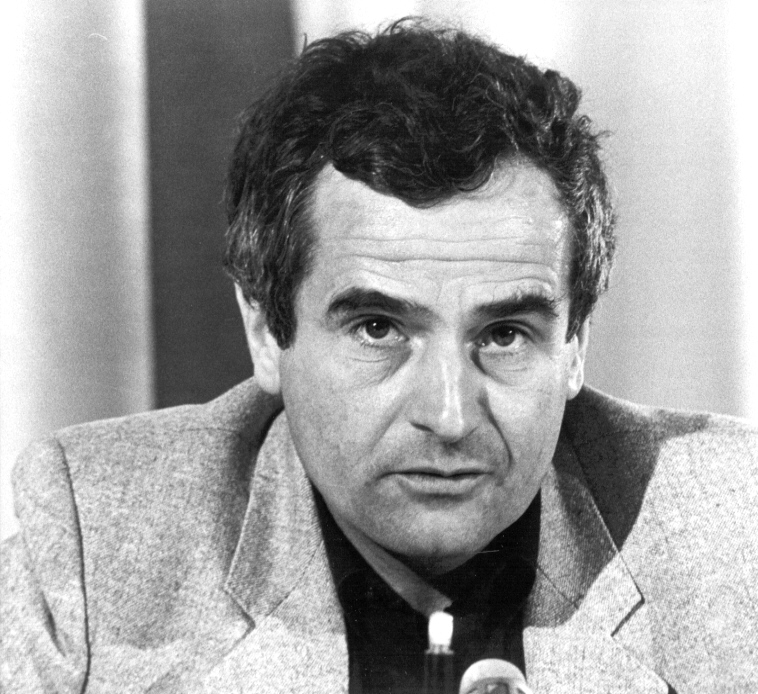
Image of Andreas Blum

Andreas Blum (21 February 1938 – 26 January 2024) was a Swiss radio journalist and actor, and director of Schweizer Radio DRS (1979–1999).

Blum grew up in Zug, and after studying history and philosophy in Munich, Bern and Basel, he joined SRG in 1967. He appeared in the television series Salto Mortale and has presented numerous programmes on Swiss television, such as Telebühne.

Blum died on 26 January 2024, at the age of 85.
