= Henry Jaeger =

German author, reformed criminal, and journalist

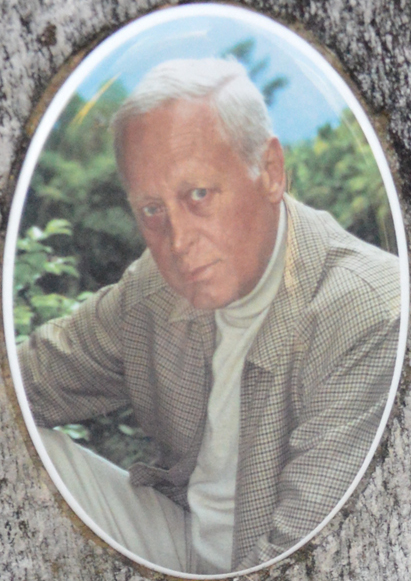

Karl-Heinz Jaeger (1927–2000) was a German author, reformed criminal, and journalist, best known for his semi-autobiographical novel The Fortress (1962). Written during his incarceration, the book was adapted into the 1964 film Condemned to Sin.
