= Berolina Film =

German film production company

Berolina Film (often shortened to Berolina) was a film production company that operated in West Germany between 1948 and 1964. The company's productions were supervised by the experienced Kurt Ulrich and were based in West Berlin. The company helped launch a cycle of popular heimatfilm made in the 1950s.

The company's name is a reference to Berolina, the allegorical female figure representing the city of Berlin. It was also the name of a short-lived company from the 1920s, notable for producing the 1924 film The Hands of Orlac.

== Selected films ==
- Everything Will Be Better in the Morning (1948)
- By a Nose (1949)
- The Black Forest Girl (1950)
- The Heath Is Green (1951)
- The Land of Smiles (1952)
- When the Heath Dreams at Night (1952)
- I Can't Marry Them All (1952)
- Mailman Mueller (1953)
- The Gypsy Baron (1954)
- Love is Forever (1954)
- Emil and the Detectives (1954)
- My Leopold (1955)
- The Happy Wanderer (1955)
- The Three from the Filling Station (1955)
- Spy for Germany (1956)
- Black Forest Melody (1956)
- Spring in Berlin (1957)
- Iron Gustav (1958)
- The Gypsy Baron (1962)
- I Learned It from Father (1964)
- Legend of a Gunfighter (1964)

== Bibliography ==
- Davidson, John & Hake, Sabine. Framing the Fifties: Cinema in a Divided Germany. Berghahn Books, 2008.
- Hake, Sabine. German National Cinema. Routledge, 2002.
