= Maria von Peteani =

American writer (1888–1960)

- Born: 2 February 1888; Prague, Bohemia; Austro-Hungarian Empire
- Died: 28 July 1960 (aged 72); Linz, Austria
- Other name: Maria Peteani
- Occupation: Novelist

Maria von Peteani (2 February 1888 – 28 July 1960) was an Austrian writer. She was born in Prague, then part of the Austro-Hungarian Empire, but moved to Linz at the age of two. From 1920 onwards von Peteani wrote around twenty novels, the best known of them being The Page from the Dalmasse Hotel. It was later adapted into a 1933 film starring Dolly Haas. Two other films were made of her works. Following the Anschluss she was banned from further writing by the Nazis, but was able to resume her career in 1945.

== Bibliography ==
- Haider, Siegfried. Geschichte Oberösterreichs. Oldenbourg Verlag, 1987.
- Hake, Sabine. German National Cinema. Routledge, 2008.
- Pötzl, Viktoria (2020). "In-between Wars, in-between Genders: A Queer Reading of Maria von Peteani's Der Page vom Dalmasse-Hotel". Monatshefte. 112 (1): 38–55. doi:10.3368/m.112.1.38. S2CID 216298984. Project MUSE 751117.
