= Kurt Hoffmann =

German film director (1910–2001)

Kurt Hoffmann(Maiky)
- Born: 12 November 1910; Freiburg im Breisgau, Grand Duchy of Baden, German Empire
- Died: 25 June 2001 (aged 90); Munich, Germany
- Occupation: Film director
- Years active: 1938–1971

Kurt Hoffmann (12 November 1910 – 25 June 2001) was a German film director, the son of Carl Hoffmann. He directed 48 films between 1938 and 1971. He ran a production company Independent Film along with Heinz Angermeyer.

His 1958 film Wir Wunderkinder was entered into the 1st Moscow International Film Festival and his 1960 film The Haunted Castle was entered into the 2nd Moscow International Film Festival where it won the Silver Prize. His 1961 film The Marriage of Mr. Mississippi was entered into the 11th Berlin International Film Festival.

== Selected filmography ==
- Bachelor's Paradise (1939)
- Hurrah! I'm a Father (1939)
- Quax the Crash Pilot (1941)
- I Entrust My Wife to You (1943)
- I'll Carry You in My Arms (1943)
- Kohlhiesel's Daughters (1943)
- The Lost Face (1948)
- Five Suspects (1950)
- Taxi-Kitty (1950)
- The Rabanser Case (1950)
- Fanfares of Love (1951)
- Queen of the Night (1951)
- Weekend in Paradise (1952)
- Klettermaxe (1952)
- Music by Night (1953)
- Heartbroken on the Moselle (1953)
- Hocuspocus (1953)
- The Abduction of the Sabine Women (1954)
- The Flying Classroom (1954)
- Fireworks (1954)
- Three Men in the Snow (1955)
- I Often Think of Piroschka (1955)
- My Husband's Getting Married Today (1956)
- Confessions of Felix Krull (1957)
- Salzburg Stories (1957)
- The Spessart Inn (1958)
- Wir Wunderkinder (1958)
- The Angel Who Pawned Her Harp (1959)
- The Beautiful Adventure (1959)
- The Haunted Castle (1960)
- Stage Fright (1960)
- The Marriage of Mr. Mississippi (1961)
- Snow White and the Seven Jugglers (1962)
- Love Has to Be Learned (1963)
- Gripsholm Castle (1963)
- The House in Karp Lane (1965)
- Praetorius (1965)
- Hocuspocus (1966)
- Liselotte of the Palatinate (1966)
- Rheinsberg (1967)
- Morning's at Seven (1968)
- The Captain (1971)
