= Wolfgang Liebeneiner =

German film director

- Born: Wolfgang Georg Louis Liebeneiner; 6 October 1905; Liebau, German Empire
- Died: 28 November 1987 (aged 82); Vienna, Austria
- Occupation: Film director

Wolfgang Georg Louis Liebeneiner (6 October 1905 – 28 November 1987) was a German actor, film director and theatre director.

== Beginnings ==
He was born in Liebau in Prussian Silesia. In 1928, he was taught by Otto Falckenberg, the director of the Munich Kammerspiele, in acting and directing.

== Nazi era ==
In 1936, Liebeneiner became a member of the Prussian State Theater (Preußisches Staatstheater) in Berlin and in 1938, he became artistic director of the German Film Academy Babelsberg (Deutsche Filmakademie Babelsberg).

In 1941, he directed the film Ich klage an (I accuse) in cooperation with the Ministry of Public Enlightenment and Propaganda. The film was about voluntary euthanasia of a woman suffering from multiple sclerosis, but was intended to support the T4 euthanasia program. He received a doctorate in the years from 1942 to 1945 while working for Universum Film AG, the largest German film studio at that time.

== Post war ==
In 1947, Liebeneiner directed the debut of Wolfgang Borchert's play Draußen vor der Tür (The Man Outside) in the Hamburg Kammerspiele. In 1956 he was successful with the film The Trapp Family.

He died on 28 November 1987, aged 82, in Vienna after a long illness.

== Personal life ==
Liebeneiner was married twice: first, from 1934 to the actress Ruth Hellberg, then from 1944 to the actress Hilde Krahl, with whom he had his daughter Johanna Liebeneiner, also an actress.

== Selected filmography ==
=== Actor ===
- The Other Side (1931)
- Happy Days in Aranjuez (1933)
- Farewell Waltz (1934)
- Music in the Blood (1934)
- Asew (1935)
- Liebelei (1933, directed by Max Ophüls)
- A Love Story (1933)
- Enjoy Yourselves (1934)
- What Am I Without You (1934)
- A Night on the Danube (1935)
- Every Day Isn't Sunday (1935)
- Artist Love (1935)
- His Late Excellency (1935)
- The Blonde Carmen (1935)
- Friedemann Bach (1941)

=== Director ===
Film

- The Model Husband (1937)
- Don't Promise Me Anything (1937)
- You and I (1938)
- Yvette (1938)
- Target in the Clouds (1939)
- The Leghorn Hat (1939)
- Bismarck (1940)
- Ich klage an (1941)
- Die Entlassung (1942)
- Melody of a Great City (1943)
- Love '47 (1949)
- My Niece Susanne (1950)
- Abundance of Life (1950)
- When a Woman Loves (1950)
- The Blue Star of the South (1951)
- Gateway to Peace (1951)
- 1. April 2000 (1952)
- The Dancing Heart (1953)
- The Stronger Woman (1953)
- The Beautiful Miller (1954)
- Love is Forever (1954)
- On the Reeperbahn at Half Past Midnight (1954)
- I Was an Ugly Girl (1955)
- Leave on Word of Honour (1955)
- The Trapp Family (1956)
- Winter in the Woods (1956)
- Queen Louise (1957)
- Goodbye, Franziska (1957)
- Immer wenn der Tag beginnt (1957)
- The Trapp Family in America (1958)
- Taiga (1958)
- Sebastian Kneipp (1958)
- My Daughter Patricia (1959)
- Jacqueline (1959)
- Ingeborg (1960)
- I'm Marrying the Director (1960)
- A Woman for Life (1960)
- Final Accord (1960)
- The Last Chapter (1961)
- Schweik's Awkward Years (1964)
- The World Revolves Around You (1964)
- When Sweet Moonlight Is Sleeping in the Hills (1969)
- The Chinese Miracle (1977)
- Goetz von Berlichingen of the Iron Hand (1979)

Television

- The Big Scene (1962) — (based on Die große Szene by Arthur Schnitzler)
- Charley's Aunt (1963) — (based on Charley's Aunt)
- Die Zaubergeige (1963) — (based on Die Zaubergeige)
- Treasure Island (1966, TV miniseries) — (based on Treasure Island)
- Ein Schloß in Schweden (1967) — (based on Château en Suède by Françoise Sagan)
- Ein ehrenwerter Herr (1968) — (based on Un grand honnête homme by Jules Romains)
- Tom Sawyers und Huckleberry Finns Abenteuer (1968, TV miniseries) — (based on Tom Sawyer and Huckleberry Finn)
- Mister Barnett (1969) — (based on Monsieur Barnett by Jean Anouilh)
- Eine konsequente Frau (1971) — (based on The Constant Wife)
- Die sieben Ohrfeigen (1971) — (remake of Seven Slaps, 1937, based on a novel by Károly Aszlányi)
- Besuch auf einem kleinen Planeten (1971) — (based on Visit to a Small Planet by Gore Vidal)
- Die Abenteuer des braven Soldaten Schwejk (1972, TV series) — (based on The Good Soldier Švejk)
- Gasparone (1973) — (based on Gasparone)
- Plaza Fortuna (1973) — (based on a novel by Gudrun Pausewang)
- Eine egoistische Liebe (1973) — (based on Sons and Lovers)
- Schwarzwaldmädel (1973) — (based on Schwarzwaldmädel)
- Spannagl & Sohn (1975–1976, TV series)
- Das kleine Hofkonzert (1976) — (based on Das kleine Hofkonzert)
- Die Abenteuer des braven Soldaten Schwejk, second season (1977, TV series) — (based on The Good Soldier Švejk)
- Das Drehbuch (1980) — (based on Le Scénario by Jean Anouilh)
- Der Garten (1983) — (based on a play by Tim Aspinall)
- Der Mustergatte (1983) — (based on Fair and Warmer)
