= List of West German films of 1955 =

List of films produced in Germany in 1955

List of West German films of 1955. This was the sixth full year of film production since the formal partition of Germany into East and West in 1949. Major production centres were gathered in Hamburg, Munich and West Berlin. A separate East German film industry controlled by DEFA operated in East Berlin.

== A–K ==
Title	Director	Cast	Genre	Notes
Alibi	Alfred Weidenmann	O.E. Hasse, Martin Held, Hardy Krüger	Crime	
The Ambassador's Wife	Hans Deppe	Paul Hubschmid, Ingrid Andree, Antje Weisgerber	Drama	
André and Ursula	Werner Jacobs	Ivan Desny, Elisabeth Müller, Ina Peters	Drama	
As Long as There Are Pretty Girls	Arthur Maria Rabenalt	Georg Thomalla, Alice Kessler, Ellen Kessler	Musical	
As Long as You Live	Harald Reinl	Adrian Hoven, Marianne Koch, Karin Dor	War	
Ball at the Savoy	Paul Martin	Rudolf Prack, Nadja Tiller, Eva Ingeborg Scholz	Musical	
Bandits of the Autobahn	Géza von Cziffra	Hans Christian Blech, Charles Régnier, Eva Ingeborg Scholz	Crime thriller	
The Barrings	Rolf Thiele	Dieter Borsche, Nadja Tiller, Paul Hartmann	Drama	
Before God and Man	Erich Engel	Viktor de Kowa, Antje Weisgerber, Hans Söhnker	Drama	
Beloved Enemy	Rolf Hansen	Ruth Leuwerik, Werner Hinz, Thomas Holtzmann	Drama	
The Blacksmith of St. Bartholomae	Max Michel	Viktor Staal, Marianne Koch, Annie Rosar	Drama	
The Captain and His Hero	Max Nosseck	Ernst Schröder, Jo Herbst, Ilse Steppat	War	
Children, Mother, and the General	László Benedek	Hilde Krahl, Therese Giehse, Ewald Balser	War drama	
Closed Exit	Ignacio F. Iquino	Viktor Staal, Laya Raki, Albert Matterstock	Crime	Co-production with Spain
The Cornet	Walter Reisch	Anita Björk, Wolfgang Preiss, Peter van Eyck	Drama	
The Dark Star	Hermann Kugelstadt	Elfie Fiegert, Ilse Steppat, Viktor Staal	Drama	
The Devil's General	Helmut Käutner	Curd Jürgens, Marianne Koch, Albert Lieven	Drama	
The Doctor's Secret	August Rieger	Hilde Krahl, Ewald Balser, Erik Frey	Drama	Co-production with Austria
Doctor Solm	Paul May	Hans Söhnker, Sybil Werden, Antje Weisgerber	Drama	
The Double Husband	Ferdinand Dörfler	Joe Stöckel, Grethe Weiser, Ingrid Pan	Comedy	
Escape to the Dolomites	Luis Trenker	Luis Trenker, Marianne Hold, Yvonne Sanson	Drama	Co-production with Italy
The False Adam	Géza von Cziffra	Waltraut Haas, Rudolf Platte, Doris Kirchner	Comedy	
Father's Day	Hans Richter	Grethe Weiser, Paul Westermeier, Camilla Spira	Comedy	
The Fisherman from Heiligensee	Hans H. König	Edith Mill, Lil Dagover, Albert Lieven	Comedy	
A Girl Without Boundaries	Géza von Radványi	Sonja Ziemann, Ivan Desny, Barbara Rütting	Drama	
The Forest House in Tyrol	Hermann Kugelstadt	Wera Frydtberg, Helmuth Schneider, Dorothea Wieck	Drama	
Fruits of Summer	Raymond Bernard	Edwige Feuillère, Henri Guisol, Etchika Choureau	Comedy	Co-production with France
Hanussen	Georg Marischka	O.W. Fischer, Liselotte Pulver, Werner Finck	Drama	
The Happy Village	Rudolf Schündler	Hannelore Bollmann, Carl Hinrichs, Gerhard Riedmann	Comedy	
The Happy Wanderer	Hans Quest	Rudolf Schock, Waltraut Haas, Willy Fritsch	Comedy	
A Heart Full of Music	Robert A. Stemmle	Vico Torriani, Ina Halley, Ruth Stephan	Musical	
Heaven Is Never Booked Up	Alfred Weidenmann	Hardy Krüger, Irene Galter, Viktor de Kowa	Comedy	
Hello, My Name is Cox	Georg Jacoby	Johannes Heesters, Nadja Tiller, Claude Borelli	Crime comedy	
Her First Date	Axel von Ambesser	Nicole Heesters, Paul Dahlke, Adrian Hoven	Comedy	Co-production with Austria
The Heroes Are Tired	Yves Ciampi	Yves Montand, María Félix, Curd Jürgens, Jean Servais, Gert Fröbe	Adventure	Co-production with France
Heroism after Hours	Multiple directors	Josef Sieber, Harald Juhnke, Oliver Hassencamp	Comedy	
The Inn on the Lahn	J.A. Hübler-Kahla	Oskar Sima, Dorit Kreysler, Ingrid Pan	Comedy	
Hotel Adlon	Josef von Báky	Nelly Borgeaud, René Deltgen, Nadja Tiller	Drama	
How Do I Become a Film Star?	Theo Lingen	Nadja Tiller, Harald Juhnke, Bibi Johns	Musical comedy	
I Know What I'm Living For	Paul Verhoeven	Luise Ullrich, Robert Freitag, Lil Dagover	Drama	
I Often Think of Piroschka	Kurt Hoffmann	Liselotte Pulver, Gunnar Möller, Wera Frydtberg	Romantic comedy	
I Was an Ugly Girl	Wolfgang Liebeneiner	Sonja Ziemann, Dieter Borsche, Karlheinz Böhm	Comedy	
The Immenhof Girls	Wolfgang Schleif	Heidi Brühl, Margarete Haagen, Paul Henckels,	Family	
Ingrid	Géza von Radványi	Johanna Matz, Paul Hubschmid, Erni Mangold	Comedy	
The Inn on the Lahn	J.A. Hübler-Kahla	Oskar Sima, Dorit Kreysler, Ingrid Pan	Comedy	
Island of the Dead	Victor Tourjansky	Willy Birgel, Inge Egger, Folke Sundquist	Drama	
Jackboot Mutiny	Georg Wilhelm Pabst	Bernhard Wicki, Karl Ludwig Diehl, Carl Wery	Thriller	
The Last Man	Harald Braun	Hans Albers, Romy Schneider, Rudolf Forster	Drama	
The Last Ten Days	Georg Wilhelm Pabst	Albin Skoda, Oskar Werner, Erik Frey	War drama	Co-production with Austria
Let the Sun Shine Again	Hubert Marischka	Hans Holt, Hertha Feiler, Cornelia Froboess	Comedy	Co-production with Austria
Lola Montès	Max Ophüls	Martine Carol, Peter Ustinov, Anton Walbrook	Drama	Co-production with France
Lost Child 312	Gustav Machatý	Inge Egger, Paul Klinger, Heli Finkenzeller	Drama	
Love, Dance and a Thousand Songs	Paul Martin	Caterina Valente, Peter Alexander, Rudolf Platte	Musical	
Love Is Just a Fairytale	Arthur Maria Rabenalt	Willy Fritsch, Claude Farell, Gerhard Riedmann	Musical comedy	
Love Without Illusions	Erich Engel	Sonja Ziemann, Curd Jürgens, Heidemarie Hatheyer	Drama	
Love's Carnival	Willy Birgel	Ruth Niehaus, Dietmar Schönherr, Elma Karlowa	Drama	

== L–Z ==
Title	Director	Cast	Genre	Notes
Ludwig II	Helmut Käutner	O.W. Fischer, Ruth Leuwerik, Marianne Koch	Historical	
The Major and the Bulls	Eduard von Borsody	Fritz Tillmann, Christiane Hörbiger, Attila Hörbiger	Comedy	
Mamitschka	Rolf Thiele	Mila Kopp, Rudolf Platte, Jester Naefe	Comedy drama	
Ein Mann vergißt die Liebe	Volker von Collande	Willy Birgel, Maria Holst, Willi Forst	Drama	
Marianne of My Youth	Julien Duvivier	Marianne Hold, Horst Buchholz, Friedrich Domin	Romance	Co-production with France
Master of Life and Death	Victor Vicas	Maria Schell, Ivan Desny, Wilhelm Borchert	Drama	
The Mistress of Solderhof	Jürgen von Alten	Ilse Werner, Viktor Staal, Annie Rosar	Drama	
Music in the Blood	Erik Ode	Viktor de Kowa, Nadia Gray, Waltraut Haas	Musical	
Music, Music and Only Music	Ernst Matray	Walter Giller, Inge Egger, Lonny Kellner	Musical	
My Children and I	Wolfgang Schleif	Grethe Weiser, Doris Kirchner, Claus Biederstaedt	Comedy drama	
My Leopold	Géza von Bolváry	Paul Hörbiger, Ingeborg Körner, Grethe Weiser	Comedy	
Oasis	Yves Allégret	Michèle Morgan, Cornell Borchers, Carl Raddatz	Adventure drama	French-West German co-production
One Woman Is Not Enough?	Ulrich Erfurth	Hilde Krahl, Hans Söhnker, Rudolf Forster	Drama	
Operation Sleeping Bag	Arthur Maria Rabenalt	Eva Ingeborg Scholz, Paul Klinger, Karlheinz Böhm	Comedy	
Parole Heimat	Fritz Stapenhorst	Michael Cramer, Rolf Weih, Peter Arens	Comedy	
The Plot to Assassinate Hitler	Falk Harnack	Wolfgang Preiss, Fritz Tillmann, Maximilian Schell	War drama	
The Priest from Kirchfeld	Hans Deppe	Ulla Jacobsson, Claus Holm, Elise Aulinger	Comedy	
Die Ratten	Robert Siodmak	Maria Schell, Curd Jürgens, Heidemarie Hatheyer	Drama	Won the Golden Bear at Berlin
Reaching for the Stars	Carl-Heinz Schroth	Erik Schumann, Liselotte Pulver, Gustav Knuth	Drama	
Request Concert	Erik Ode	Germaine Damar, Georg Thomalla, Renate Holm	Musical	
Ripening Youth	Ulrich Erfurth	Adelheid Seeck, Maximilian Schell, Albert Lieven	Drama	
Roman einer Siebzehnjährigen	Paul Verhoeven	Ingrid Andree, Heidi Brühl, Paul Dahlke	Drama	
Roses in Autumn	Rudolf Jugert	Ruth Leuwerik, Bernhard Wicki, Carl Raddatz	Drama	
Royal Hunt in Ischl	Hans Schott-Schöbinger	Elma Karlowa, Herta Staal, Hans von Borsody	Historical	Co-production with Austria
The Royal Waltz	Victor Tourjansky	Marianne Koch, Michael Cramer, Linda Geiser	Historical	
Sacred Lie	Wolfgang Liebeneiner	Ulla Jacobsson, Karlheinz Böhm, Erwin Strahl	Drama	
Secrets of the City	Fritz Kortner	Paul Hörbiger, Adrian Hoven, Grethe Weiser	Drama	
Sergeant Borck	Gerhard Lamprecht	Gerhard Riedmann, Annemarie Düringer, Ingrid Andree	Crime mystery	
Silence in the Forest	Helmut Weiss	Rudolf Lenz, Sonja Sutter, Angelika Hauff	Drama	
Sky Without Stars	Helmut Käutner	Erik Schumann, Eva Kotthaus, Horst Buchholz	Drama	
Son Without a Home	Hans Deppe	Werner Krauss, Elisabeth Flickenschildt, Josefin Kipper	Drama	
The Song of Kaprun	Anton Kutter	Waltraut Haas, Albert Lieven, Eduard Köck	Drama	Co-production with Austria
The Spanish Fly	Carl Boese	Joe Stöckel, Erika von Thellmann, Rudolf Platte	Comedy	
Special Delivery	John Brahm	Joseph Cotten, Eva Bartok, René Deltgen	Comedy	
Stopover in Orly	Jean Dréville	Dany Robin, Dieter Borsche, Heinz Rühmann	Romance	Co-production with France
Three Days Confined to Barracks	Georg Jacoby	Ernst Waldow, Grethe Weiser, Eva Probst	Comedy	
Three Girls from the Rhine	Georg Jacoby	Gardy Granass, Margit Saad, Fita Benkhoff	Comedy	
The Three from the Filling Station	Hans Wolff	Adrian Hoven, Walter Giller, Walter Müller	Musical	
Two Blue Eyes	Gustav Ucicky	Marianne Koch, Claus Holm, Helen Vita	Romance	
Verrat an Deutschland	Veit Harlan	Kristina Söderbaum, Paul Muller, Valéry Inkijinoff	Spy drama	
Wenn der Vater mit dem Sohne	Hans Quest	Heinz Rühmann, Waltraut Haas, Sybil Werden	Comedy drama	
When the Alpine Roses Bloom	Hans Deppe, Richard Häussler	Hertha Feiler, Claus Holm, Marianne Hold	Drama	
Yes, Yes, Love in Tyrol	Géza von Bolváry	Gerhard Riedmann, Hans Moser, Doris Kirchner	Comedy	
You Can No Longer Remain Silent	Robert A. Stemmle	Heidemarie Hatheyer, Wilhelm Borchert, Werner Hinz	Drama	
Your Life Guards	Hans Deppe	Ingrid Andree, Gerhard Riedmann, Wolf Albach-Retty	Romance	
08/15 at Home	Paul May	O.E. Hasse, Joachim Fuchsberger, Hans Christian Blech	War	
08/15 – Part 2	Paul May	O.E. Hasse, Joachim Fuchsberger, Hans Christian Blech	War	

== Shorts, Documentaries and Animated films ==
Title	Director	Cast	Genre	Notes
Cinderella	Fritz Genschow	Rita-Maria Nowotny, Renée Stobrawa, Werner Stock	Family	
Rumpelstiltskin	Herbert B. Fredersdorf	F.W. Schröder-Schrom, Harry Wüstenhagen, Wilhelm Grothe	Family	
Snow White and the Seven Dwarfs	Erich Kobler	Elke Arendt, Addi Adametz	Family	
Der Struwwelpeter	Fritz Genschow	Fredy Kaindl, Traude Höhnisch, Eric Canso	Family	Based on Struwwelpeter

== Bibliography ==
- Davidson, John & Hake, Sabine. Framing the Fifties: Cinema in a Divided Germany. Berghahn Books, 2007.
- Fehrenbach, Heide. Cinema in Democratizing Germany: Reconstructing National Identity After Hitler. University of North Carolina Press, 1995.

== See also ==
- List of Austrian films of 1955
- List of East German films of 1955
