= List of West German films of 1956 =

List of films produced in Germany in 1956

This is a list of feature films produced and distributed in West Germany in 1956.

== A–Z ==
Title	Director	Cast	Genre	Notes
As Long as the Roses Bloom	Hans Deppe	Hertha Feiler, Willy Fritsch, Gerhard Riedmann	Romance	
Ballerina	Georg Wilhelm Pabst	Willy Birgel, Elisabeth Müller, Ivan Desny	Drama	
The Bath in the Barn	Paul Martin	Sonja Ziemann, Paul Klinger, Herta Staal	Comedy	Co-production with Austria
The Beautiful Master	Rudolf Schündler	Herta Staal, Walter Gross, Susi Nicoletti	Comedy	
Before Sundown	Gottfried Reinhardt	Hans Albers, Martin Held, Hannelore Schroth	Drama	Entered into the 6th Berlin International Film Festival and won the Golden Globe Award for Best Foreign Language Film
The Beggar Student	Werner Jacobs	Gerhard Riedmann, Waltraut Haas, Elma Karlowa	Musical	
Beloved Corinna	Eduard von Borsody	Elisabeth Müller, Hannelore Schroth, Hans Söhnker	Drama	
Between Time and Eternity	Arthur Maria Rabenalt	Lilli Palmer, Willy Birgel, Carlos Thompson	Drama	Co-production with Spain
Black Forest Melody	Géza von Bolváry	Carl Wery, Gardy Granass, Willy Fritsch	Comedy	
Bonjour Kathrin	Karl Anton	Caterina Valente, Peter Alexander, Dietmar Schönherr	Musical	
The Captain from Köpenick	Helmut Käutner	Heinz Rühmann, Hannelore Schroth, Martin Held	Comedy drama	
Charley's Aunt	Hans Quest	Heinz Rühmann, Claus Biederstaedt, Walter Giller	Comedy	
Devil in Silk	Rolf Hansen	Lilli Palmer, Curd Jürgens, Winnie Markus	Drama	
The First Day of Spring	Helmut Weiss	Luise Ullrich, Paul Dahlke, Ingeborg Schöner	Comedy	
Forest Liesel	Herbert B. Fredersdorf	Anita Gutwell, Rudolf Lenz, Rudolf Carl	Comedy drama	
Friederike von Barring	Rolf Thiele	Nadja Tiller, Carl Raddatz, Martin Held	Drama	
Fruit in the Neighbour's Garden	Erich Engels	Oskar Sima, Grethe Weiser, Ursula Herking	Comedy	
Fruit Without Love	Ulrich Erfurth	Gertrud Kückelmann, Bernhard Wicki, Claus Holm	Drama	
The Girl from Flanders	Helmut Käutner	Maximilian Schell, Nicole Berger, Gert Fröbe	War drama	
The Golden Bridge	Paul Verhoeven	Ruth Leuwerik, Curd Jürgens, Paul Hubschmid	Drama	
A Heart Returns Home	Eugen York	Maximilian Schell, Maria Holst, Willy Birgel	Drama	
Holiday in Tyrol	Wolfgang Schleif	Hans Söhnker, Edith Mill, Michael Ande	Drama	
The Hunter from Roteck	Hermann Kugelstadt	Michael Cramer, Doris Kirchner, Oskar Sima	Drama	
Ich suche Dich	O. W. Fischer	O.W. Fischer, Anouk Aimée, Nadja Tiller	Drama	
I'll See You at Lake Constance	Hans Albin	Gretl Schörg, Lonny Kellner, Carola Höhn	Musical comedy	
In Hamburg When the Nights Are Long	Max Michel	Barbara Rütting, Erwin Strahl, Dorit Kreysler	Crime	
Kitty and the Great Big World	Alfred Weidenmann	Romy Schneider, Karlheinz Böhm, O.E. Hasse	Comedy	
Liane, Jungle Goddess	Eduard von Borsody	Marion Michael, Hardy Krüger, Reggie Nalder	Adventure	
Like Once Lili Marleen	Paul Verhoeven	Adrian Hoven, Marianne Hold, Claus Holm	Drama	
Love	Horst Hächler	Maria Schell, Raf Vallone, Eva Kotthaus	Drama	Co-production with Italy
Love, Summer and Music	Hubert Marischka	Joe Stöckel, Dorit Kreysler, Jutta Günther	Comedy	Co-production with Austria
Max and Moritz	Norbert Schultze	Harry Wüstenhagen, Kristian Schultze	Family	
Melody of the Heath	Ulrich Erfurth	Carsta Löck, Martin Benrath, Kurt Vespermann	Romance	
Michel Strogoff	Carmine Gallone	Curd Jürgens, Geneviève Page, Sylva Koscina	Adventure	Co-production with France
The Model Husband	Erik Ode	Harald Juhnke, Inge Egger, Theo Lingen	Comedy	
My Aunt, Your Aunt	Carl Boese	Theo Lingen, Hans Moser, Georg Thomalla	Comedy	
My Brother Joshua	Hans Deppe	Willy A. Kleinau, Ingrid Andree, Gunnar Möller	Drama	
My Father, the Actor	Robert Siodmak	O.W. Fischer, Hilde Krahl, Susanne von Almassy	Drama	
My Husband's Getting Married Today	Kurt Hoffmann	Liselotte Pulver, Johannes Heesters, Paul Hubschmid	Comedy	
My Sixteen Sons	Hans Domnick	Lil Dagover, Karl Ludwig Diehl, Else Reval	Drama	
Night of Decision	Falk Harnack	Carl Raddatz, Hilde Krahl, Albert Lieven	Drama	
Nina	Rudolf Jugert	Anouk Aimée, Karlheinz Böhm, Peter Carsten	Drama	
The Old Forester House	Harald Philipp	Paul Klinger, Anita Gutwell, Trude Hesterberg	Comedy drama	
Regine	Harald Braun	Johanna Matz, Erik Schumann, Horst Buchholz	Drama	
San Salvatore	Werner Jacobs	Dieter Borsche, Antje Weisgerber, Will Quadflieg	Drama	
Santa Lucia	Werner Jacobs	Vico Torriani, Eva Kerbler, Karin Dor	Musical, comedy	
Smaragden-Geschichte	Kurt Wilhelm	Liselotte Pulver, Joachim Fuchsberger	Crime comedy	
Spy for Germany	Werner Klingler	Martin Held, Nadja Tiller, Viktor Staal	Thriller	
The Stolen Trousers	Géza von Cziffra	Susanne Cramer, Ruth Stephan, Peter Weck	Comedy	
The Story of Anastasia	Falk Harnack	Lilli Palmer, Ivan Desny, Dorothea Wieck	Drama	
Supreme Confession	Sergio Corbucci	Anna Maria Ferrero, Massimo Serato, Sonja Ziemann	Drama	Co-production with Italy
Teenage Wolfpack	Georg Tressler	Horst Buchholz, Karin Baal, Christian Doermer	Crime drama	
A Thousand Melodies	Hans Deppe	Bibi Johns, Gardy Granass, Martin Benrath	Musical	
Three Birch Trees on the Heath	Ulrich Erfurth	Margit Saad, Sonja Sutter, Helmuth Schneider	Drama	
Through the Forests and Through the Trees	Georg Wilhelm Pabst	Eva Bartok, Peter Arens, Joe Stöckel	Comedy	
The Tour Guide of Lisbon	Hans Deppe	Vico Torriani, Inge Egger, Gunnar Möller	Comedy	
The Trapp Family	Wolfgang Liebeneiner	Ruth Leuwerik, Hans Holt, Josef Meinrad	Comedy drama	
Two Bavarians in St. Pauli	Hermann Kugelstadt	Joe Stöckel, Beppo Brem, Lucie Englisch	Comedy	
Viele kamen vorbei	Peter Pewas	Christian Doermer, Harald Maresch, Frances Martin	Thriller	
The Vulture Wally	František Čáp	Barbara Rütting, Carl Möhner, Helga Neuner	Drama	
Where the Ancient Forests Rustle	Alfons Stummer	Willy Fritsch, Josefin Kipper, Carl Möhner	Drama	
Without You All Is Darkness	Curd Jürgens	Eva Bartok, René Deltgen, Ursula Grabley	Drama	

== Bibliography ==
- Davidson, John & Hake, Sabine. Framing the Fifties: Cinema in a Divided Germany. Berghahn Books, 2007.
- Fehrenbach, Heide. Cinema in Democratizing Germany: Reconstructing National Identity After Hitler. University of North Carolina Press, 1995.

== See also ==
- List of Austrian films of 1956
- List of East German films of 1956
