= Bon Voyage (1954 film) =

1954 film

- Directed by: Thomas Engel
- Written by: Max Bertuch (libretto); Paul Helwig; Kurt Schwabach (libretto); Herbert Witt
- Starring: Paul Hubschmid; Inge Egger; Paul Klinger
- Cinematography: Hans Schneeberger
- Edited by: Carl Otto Bartning
- Music by: Hans Carste; Eduard Künneke (operetta)
- Production company: Capitol Film
- Distributed by: Prisma Film
- Release date: 21 December 1954
- Running time: 85 minutes
- Country: West Germany
- Language: German

Bon Voyage (German: Glückliche Reise) is a 1954 West German musical comedy film directed by Thomas Engel and starring Paul Hubschmid, Inge Egger and Paul Klinger.

The film's sets were designed by the art directors Emil Hasler and Walter Kutz. It was shot at the Tempelhof Studios in Berlin and on location in Hamburg and the Balearic Islands.

== Plot ==
Robert Langen and Lutz Steffens are two scientists stationed on the desert island of Formitosa in the South Seas. Getting bored and a little homesick, they want to exchange letters with young women from their homeland and put a classified ad in a Hamburg newspaper. It does not take long before the two receive the first letters. Lutz gets mail from a Monika Brinkmann, while Robert's correspondent is called Eva Gordon. They are unaware that Eva Gordon does not know anything about her letter which was actually written by Monika on a whim.

When the two young scientists are recalled to their institute in Hamburg for a short time, they immediately pay a visit to the travel agency where Monika works. Robert is very pleasantly surprised when seeing Monika, who happens to be a part-time photo model. In contrast, Lutz is irritated by Eva's reaction when he finally meets her. It turns out that Dr. Eva Gordon is engaged to her boss, the somewhat distracted mathematics professor van Mühlen, and the wedding is supposed to be the next day. Outraged, Eva goes to the police to report the misuse of her name and photo. Monika has no choice but to admit the fraud and apologize to Eva. In the meantime, Eva has taken a liking to the cheeky young man. After some small confusions, two couples in love travel to Formitosa.

== Cast ==
- Paul Hubschmid as Robert Langen
- Inge Egger as Eva Gordon
- Paul Klinger as Mr. van Mühlen
- Peer Schmidt as Lutz Steffens
- Ina Peters as Monika Brinkmann
- Margarete Haagen as Mrs. van Mühlen
- Ernst Sattler as Onkel August
- Alfred Balthoff as Fotograf Lankwitz
- Emmy Burg as Tante Emilie
- Charles Hans Vogt as Barbier
- Ingrid Rentsch as Consuela, Barbier's wife
- Renate Feuereisen
- Kurt Vespermann
- Hans Hessling
- Walter Gross
- Eva Lissa
- Gerd Vespermann
- Ilse Abel
- Egon Brosig
- Fritz Grieb
- Paul Günther (actor)
- Wolfgang Kühne
- Annette Meilenthin
- Klaus Miedel
- Werner Schöne
- Jenie von Lossow
- Rieke Zbrzezny
