= Girl with a Future =

1954 film

- Directed by: Thomas Engel
- Written by: Fritz Aeckerle; Georg Fraser; George Hurdalek
- Starring: Herta Staal; Peter Pasetti; Nadja Tiller
- Cinematography: Bruno Mondi
- Edited by: Herbert B. Fredersdorf
- Music by: Heino Gaze
- Production company: Capitol Film
- Distributed by: Prisma Film
- Release date: 17 April 1954
- Running time: 92 minutes
- Country: West Germany
- Language: German

Girl with a Future (German: Mädchen mit Zukunft) is a 1954 West German comedy drama film directed by Thomas Engel and starring Herta Staal, Peter Pasetti and Nadja Tiller. It was shot at the Tempelhof Studios in West Berlin.The film's sets were designed by the art directors Emil Hasler and Walter Kutz.

== Cast ==
- Herta Staal as Inge Wendler
- Peter Pasetti as Achmed Spiro
- Nadja Tiller as Fatme
- Hans Richter as Peter
- Grethe Weiser as Frau Sanders
- Carl-Heinz Schroth as Otto Rontholz
- Al Hoosmann as Hassan
- Ursula von Manescul as Sybille
- Kurt Vespermann as Emil Duske
- Joe Furtner as Medefint
- Wolfgang Jansen
- Hans Hessling
- Emmy Burg
- Wolfgang Kühne
- Hans-Otto Krüger
- Lou Seitz

== Bibliography ==
- Bock, Hans-Michael & Bergfelder, Tim. The Concise CineGraph. Encyclopedia of German Cinema. Berghahn Books, 2009.
