= The Girl from Flanders =

1956 film directed by Helmut Käutner

- German film poster
- German: Ein Mädchen aus Flandern
- Directed by: Helmut Käutner
- Written by: Carl Zuckmayer (novel); Heinz Pauck; Helmut Käutner
- Produced by: Herbert Uhlich
- Starring: Nicole Berger; Maximilian Schell; Viktor de Kowa
- Cinematography: Friedl Behn-Grund
- Edited by: Anneliese Schönnenbeck
- Music by: Bernhard Eichhorn
- Production company: Capitol Film
- Distributed by: Prisma Film
- Release date: 16 February 1956
- Running time: 105 minutes
- Country: West Germany
- Language: German

The Girl from Flanders (German: Ein Mädchen aus Flandern) is a 1956 romantic drama film directed by Helmut Käutner starring Nicole Berger, Maximilian Schell, and Viktor de Kowa. It is an adaption of the novel Engele von Löwen (Angele de Louvain) written by Carl Zuckmayer.

It was shot at the Tempelhof Studios in Berlin with location filming around the town of Damme in Flanders. The film's sets were designed by the art directors Emil Hasler and Walter Kutz.

== Plot ==
1914, German advance through Belgium: the young war volunteer Alexander 'Alex' Haller (Schell) is given water by a young Belgian woman (Berger). 1917, Third Battle of Flanders: Alex, now a 2nd lieutenant, is tired of the propaganda on the Home Front, so he spends his furlough in the hinterland of the Western Front. While boarding in a brothel, he meets the young woman again. They fall in love. Late 1918, German retreat after the Armistice: Engele and Alex meet again, only to be harassed by a Belgian mob. Shortly prior to being hanged by the mob, a group of passing Belgian soldiers, tired of the killing, saves them. End of the tale.

== Cast ==
- Nicole Berger as Angeline Meunier / Engele
- Maximilian Schell as Lt. Alexander 'Alex' Haller
- Viktor de Kowa as Monsieur le Curé Simon / Dr.Simon
- Friedrich Domin as Maj. Gen Leopold Haller, Alex's Father
- Anneliese Römer as Lysette, Simon's Sister
- Erica Balqué as Elisabeth Roeder, Alex's Sister
- Fritz Tillmann as Hauptmann Lüdemann
- Gert Fröbe as Rittmeister Kupfer
- Stanislav Ledinek as Feldwebel Roebig
- Wolfried Lier as Neukerk
- Clemens Hasse as Zahlmeister
- Willi Rose as Fahrer Wuttig
- Reinhard Kolldehoff as 1. Revolutionär / Simon's Henchmen
- Hans Hessling as 2. Revolutionär / Simon's Henchmen
- Nelly Beguin as Josine
- Jochen Blume as Major
- Emmy Burg as Frau Schröppke
- Lise Coliny as Augustine Wulverghem
- Omer Ducarme as Pierre
- Eberhard Fechner as The Jasmine Soldier
- Klaus Kammer as Heniz Shopkay
- Helmut Käutner as Wachtposten
- Arthur Schröder as Oberst Träutlein
- Friedrich Maurer as Kriegsgerichtsrat
- Wolfgang Völz as Major Gunloc
- Konrad Wagner as Colonel Kruder
- Herbert Weissbach as Rucksnider
- Joachim Wichmann as Kleinsmidt
- Ralf Wolter as German Soldier
- Eva Bodden
- Jeanne Brissac
- Otto A. Buck
- Inge Drexel
- Fritz Eberth
- Hellmut Grube
- Valentin Klaus
- Karl Klüsner
- Felix Knemöller
- Guillaume Lambrette
- Oskar Lindner
- Curt Lucas
- Ursula Lyn
- Brigitte Olm
- Gisela Reiche
- Rüdiger Renn
- Martin Rickelt
- Harald Sawade
- Lili Schoenborn-Anspach
- Karl Ludwig Schreiber
- Thea Thiele
- Karin von Dassel
- Günter von Wyhl
- Kurt Weitkamp
