= Consul Strotthoff =

1954 film

- Directed by: Erich Engel
- Written by: Felix Lützkendorf
- Produced by: Richard H. Riedel; Herbert Uhlich
- Starring: Willy Birgel; Inge Egger; Carl Wery
- Cinematography: Karl Löb; Fritz Arno Wagner
- Edited by: Carl Otto Bartning
- Music by: Hans-Otto Borgmann
- Production company: Capitol Film
- Distributed by: Prisma Film
- Release date: 15 July 1954
- Running time: 103 minutes
- Country: West Germany
- Language: German

Consul Strotthoff (German: Konsul Strotthoff) is a 1954 West German romantic drama film directed by Erich Engel and starring Willy Birgel, Inge Egger, and Carl Wery. It is also known by the alternative title of Melody Beyond Love.

The film's sets were designed by the art directors Emil Hasler and Walter Kutz.

== Synopsis ==
In Salzburg a love triangle develops around a pretty music student working as a tour guide.

== Cast ==
- Willy Birgel as Konsul Strotthoff
- Inge Egger as Marlene Roedern
- Carl Wery as Professor Wegener
- Erik Schumann as Hans Hellmer
- Ida Krottendorf as Helga
- Margarete Haagen as Mutter Strotthoff
- Charles Regnier as Conrad Eylers
- Gerd Vespermann
- Joseph Egger
- Lou Seitz as Mutter Mitterecker
- Willy Maertens
- Joe Furtner as Hotelportier
- Käte Alving
- Lothar Brüning
- Georg A. Profé as Meraner, Pedell
- Claus Peter Lüttgen

== Bibliography ==
- Bock, Hans-Michael; Bergfelder, Tim, eds. (2009). The Concise Cinegraph: Encyclopaedia of German Cinema. New York: Berghahn Books. ISBN 978-1-57181-655-9.
