= The Axe of Wandsbek =

The Axe of Wandsbek (German: Das Beil von Wandsbek) may refer to:

- Das Beil von Wandsbek (novel), a novel by German writer Arnold Zweig
- The Axe of Wandsbek (1951 film), a 1951 East German film based on the novel and directed by Falk Harnack
- The Axe of Wandsbek (1982 film), a 1982 West German film based on the novel and directed by Horst Königstein und Heinrich Breloer
