= You Only Live Once (1952 film) =

1952 film

- German: Man lebt nur einmal
- Directed by: Ernst Neubach
- Written by: Ernst Neubach
- Produced by: Artur Brauner; Heinz Laaser
- Starring: Theo Lingen; Marina Ried; Rudolf Platte
- Cinematography: Otto Baecker
- Edited by: Johanna Meisel
- Music by: Heinrich Riethmüller
- Production company: CCC Films
- Distributed by: Atlantic-Filmverleih
- Release date: 7 November 1952
- Running time: 85 minutes
- Country: West Germany
- Language: German

You Only Live Once (German: Man lebt nur einmal) is a 1952 West German comedy film directed by Ernst Neubach and starring Theo Lingen, Marina Ried and Rudolf Platte. It was a remake of the 1931 film The Man in Search of His Murderer. It was shot at the Spandau Studios in Berlin. The film's sets were designed by Emil Hasler and Walter Kutz.

== Partial cast ==
- Theo Lingen as Robert Heinemann
- Marina Ried as Kiki Marshall
- Rudolf Platte as Thomas
- Lisa Stammer as Lilian
- Paul Hörbiger as Karl Heinemann
- Siegfried Breuer as Rollincourt
- Wolfgang Neuss as Boxer-Willy
- Erich Fiedler as Nat Pinkerton
- Klaus Günter Neumann as Heinrich
- Ruth Stephan as Frl. Rosa

== Bibliography ==
- Bergfelder, Tim (2005). International Adventures: German Popular Cinema and European Co-Productions in the 1960s. Berghahn Books. ISBN 978-1-57181-539-2.
