= The Silent Guest =

1945 film

- Directed by: Harald Braun
- Written by: Harald Braun; Theodor Fontane (novel); Kurt Heynicke
- Produced by: Fritz Thiery
- Starring: René Deltgen; Gisela Uhlen; Rudolf Fernau
- Cinematography: Robert Baberske
- Edited by: Milo Harbich
- Music by: Werner Eisbrenner
- Production company: UFA
- Distributed by: Deutsche Filmvertriebs
- Release date: March 1945
- Running time: 100 minutes
- Country: Germany
- Language: German

The Silent Guest (German: Der stumme Gast) is a 1945 German crime film directed by Harald Braun and starring René Deltgen, Gisela Uhlen and Rudolf Fernau. It was one of the final films released during the Nazi era. It received its Austrian premiere in Vienna in 1950.

The film's sets were designed by the art director Emil Hasler, Carl Ludwig Kirmse and Walter Kutz.

== Cast ==
- René Deltgen as Matthias Radscheck
- Gisela Uhlen as Lisa Radscheck
- Rudolf Fernau as Oskar Kampmann
- Jaspar von Oertzen as Gendarm Geelhaar
- Carsta Löck as Marianne Ebeling
- Willi Rose as Eduard, Ladengehilfe
- Ethel Reschke as Trude, Kaltmamsell
- Herbert Hübner as Von Wedelstedt, Gutsbesitzer
- Friedhelm von Petersson as Dieter von Wedelstedt
- Sigrid Becker as Helene, Magd
- Walter Janssen as Eccelius, Apotheker
- Ingolf Kuntze as Prosecutor
- Josef Sieber as Jakob, Knecht
- Toni Impekoven as Vohwinkel, Gerichtsrat
- Karl Hannemann as Buggenhagen
- Arnim Suessenguth as Siebenkorn, Schmuggler
- Hella Thornegg as Witwe Wagenbrett
- Gert Geiger as Wonnekamp

== Bibliography ==
- Bock, Hans-Michael; Bergfelder, Tim, eds. (2009). The Concise Cinegraph: Encyclopaedia of German Cinema. New York: Berghahn Books. ISBN 978-1-57181-655-9.
