= The Bath in the Barn =

The Bath in the Barn (German:Das Bad auf der Tenne) may refer to:

- The Bath in the Barn (1943 film), a German film
- The Bath in the Barn (1956 film), a West German film remake
