= A Rare Lover =

1950 film

- Directed by: Alfred Braun
- Written by: Franz Gribitz (play)
- Produced by: Hans Herbert Ulrich; Hans von Wolzogen
- Starring: Susanne von Almassy; Irene von Meyendorff; Curd Jürgens
- Cinematography: Bruno Stephan
- Edited by: Walter Wischniewsky
- Music by: Herbert Trantow
- Production company: Scala Film
- Distributed by: Deutsche Comerz-Film
- Release date: 29 December 1950
- Running time: 90 minutes
- Country: West Germany
- Language: German

A Rare Lover or Pikanterie (German: Eine seltene Geliebte) is a 1950 West German romance film directed by Alfred Braun and starring Susanne von Almassy, Irene von Meyendorff and Curd Jürgens.

The film's sets were designed by the art director Emil Hasler. It was shot in Belgium, Paris, Geneva and West Berlin.

== Synopsis ==
The film is set in Paris and concerns the publication of a racy new novel.

== Cast ==
- Susanne von Almassy as Gabrielle Courtois
- Irene von Meyendorff as Hortense Clairmont
- Curd Jürgens as Sascha Borotraz
- Hubert von Meyerinck as Poule, Verlege
- Hans Olden as Bankpräsident
- Carl-Heinz Schroth as Pierre, Diener
- Marina Ried as Angèle, Zofe
- Elisabeth Flickenschildt as Madame Laroche
- Franz Weber Baptiste, Kammerdiener
- Walter Gross

== Bibliography ==
- Bock, Hans-Michael & Bergfelder, Tim. The Concise CineGraph. Encyclopedia of German Cinema. Berghahn Books, 2009.
