= Gestatten, mein Name ist Cox =

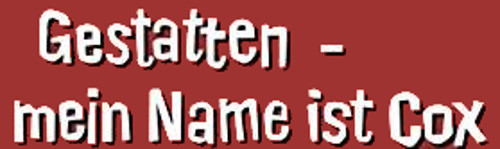
- Starring: Günter Pfitzmann; Wolfgang Neuss
- Country of origin: Germany

Gestatten, mein Name ist Cox ("Good Evening, My Name Is Cox") is a series of crime novels and audio dramas written by the German couple Rolf Becker and Alexandra Becker, later also adapted to a television series and a movie. The series chronicle the adventures of Paul Cox, a professional gambler (antique dealer in the TV series) in London, with a tendency to get involved in intricate murder mysteries, where he often ends up as the main suspect and has to evade police and solve the crime to clear his name. He's aided in all his adventures by his friend Thomas Richardson, a private detective.

== See also ==
- List of German television series
