= Richard H. Riedel =

American art director (1904–1960)

- Born: April 5, 1904
- Died: March 18, 1960 (aged 55); Rome, Italy
- Occupation: Art director
- Years active: 1937-1960

Richard H. Riedel (April 5, 1904 – March 18, 1960) was an American art director. He was nominated for an Academy Award in the category Best Art Direction for the film Pillow Talk.

== Selected filmography ==
- Riding for Germany (1941)
- Diesel (1942)
- The Noltenius Brothers (1945)
- Consul Strotthoff (1954)
- Before God and Man (1955)
- Made in Germany (1957)
- Pillow Talk (1959)
