= The Colourful Dream =

1952 film

- German: Der bunte Traum
- Directed by: Géza von Cziffra
- Written by: Géza von Cziffra
- Produced by: Erich Holder; Fritz Kirchhoff
- Starring: Vera Molnar; Josef Meinrad; Ursula Grabley
- Cinematography: Georg Bruckbauer
- Edited by: Carl Otto Bartning
- Music by: Michael Jary
- Production company: Pontus Film
- Distributed by: Allianz Filmverleih
- Release date: 29 February 1952
- Running time: 101 minutes
- Country: West Germany
- Language: German

The Colourful Dream (German: Der bunte Traum) is a 1952 West German musical comedy film directed by Géza von Cziffra and starring Vera Molnar, Josef Meinrad and Ursula Grabley. It was made at the Tempelhof Studios in Berlin with some location shooting in Italy. The film's sets were designed by Emil Hasler and Walter Kutz. It was made in Gevacolor.

== Synopsis ==
The plot concerns two aspiring young women performers, an actress and an ice skater, who after a failed tour of Italy attempt to get publicity in the newspapers.

== Partial cast ==
- Vera Molnar as Marina
- Josef Meinrad as Tobby Busch
- Felicitas Busi as Ditta Bodin
- Walter Giller as Benno
- Ursula Grabley as Gloria Gelblich
- Oskar Sima as Director Gelblich
- Hans Olden as Richard Haller
- Ethel Reschke as Mary Miller
- Hubert von Meyerinck as Brandini
- Madelon Truß as Stella Lauri
- Walter Janssen as Tamaroff
- Edith Schollwer as Frau Brandini
