= Capitol Film =

German film company

Capitol Film was a West German film production company active between 1953 and 1956 established by Arno Hauke. The company was able to utilise the assets of the former UFA company, now being held in a trust of which Hauke was an accountant and director. With the trust's funds Hauke had also acquired a distribution company Prisma Film to release Capitol's films.

Allegations were made that the company had been founded as an attempt to get round restrictions of the Allied occupation authorities forbidding the revival of the old UFA. This led to an investigation by the Bundestag. However, after eleven productions Capitol had suffered heavy losses and went bankrupt.

Nonetheless in 1955 the West German government approved the sale of UFA assets back into private ownership and the revival of UFA production operations. Hauke was appointed to oversee the revived company, but his productions again struggled at the box office and he was removed from his position. It was said that Hauke's failed UFA production strategy was "identical to the one at Capitol".

== Filmography ==
- The Stronger Woman (1953)
- The Dancing Heart (1953)
- A Life for Do (1954)
- Consul Strotthoff (1954)
- Girl with a Future (1954)
- The Little Town Will Go to Sleep (1954)
- The Witch (1954)
- Bon Voyage (1954)
- Heaven Is Never Booked Up (1955)
- Before God and Man (1955)
- The Girl from Flanders (1956)

== Bibliography ==
- Davidson, John & Hake, Sabine. Framing the Fifties: Cinema in a Divided Germany. Berghahn Books, 2008.
- Kreimeier, Klaus. The Ufa Story: A History of Germany's Greatest Film Company, 1918-1945. University of California Press, 1999.
