= The Dancing Heart =

1953 film

- Directed by: Wolfgang Liebeneiner
- Written by: Walter F. Fichelscher (novel); Wolfgang Liebeneiner
- Produced by: Peter Paul Brauer
- Starring: Gertrud Kückelmann; Gunnar Möller; Wilfried Seyferth
- Cinematography: Igor Oberberg
- Edited by: Carl Otto Bartning
- Music by: Norbert Schultze
- Production company: Capitol Film
- Distributed by: Prisma Film
- Release date: 23 October 1953
- Running time: 90 minutes
- Country: West Germany
- Language: German

The Dancing Heart (German: Das tanzende Herz) is a 1953 West German historical musical comedy film directed by Wolfgang Liebeneiner and starring Gertrud Kückelmann, Gunnar Möller, and Wilfried Seyferth. It was made at the Tempelhof Studios in Berlin. The film was shot using Agfacolor. The film's sets were designed by the art directors Emil Hasler and Walter Kutz.

== Cast ==
- Gertrud Kückelmann as Susanne
- Gunnar Möller as Viktor
- Wilfried Seyferth as Leopold
- Herta Staal as Ännchen
- Paul Hörbiger as Prince
- Paul Henckels as Haberling
- Harald Juhnke as Julius
- Erwin Biegel as Applinger
- Heinz Rosen as Robert
- Herbert Kiper as Innkeeper
- Toni Larater as Dancer
- Genia Ugrinsky as Dancer
- Rainer Koechermann as Dancer
- Michael Rayne as Dancer
- Charlotte Ander as Therese
- Michel Rayne as Dancer
- Maria Fris as The Doll
- Toni Lander as Dancer
- Erika Helmert as Lottchen
- Karl Ludwig Schreiber as Der Ballordner
- Theo Sedat as Polizist Kuzius
- Ursula von Manescul as Käthe

== Bibliography ==
- Bock, Hans-Michael; Bergfelder, Tim, eds. (2009). The Concise Cinegraph: Encyclopaedia of German Cinema. New York: Berghahn Books. ISBN 978-1-57181-655-9.
