= The Witch (1954 film) =

1954 film

- German film poster
- German: Die Hexe
- Directed by: Gustav Ucicky
- Written by: Emil Burri; Johannes Mario Simmel; Gustav Ucicky
- Starring: Anita Björk; Karlheinz Böhm; Attila Hörbiger
- Cinematography: Franz Hofer; Hans Schneeberger
- Edited by: Carl Otto Bartning
- Music by: Bert Grund
- Production company: Capitol Film
- Distributed by: Prisma Film
- Release date: 15 October 1954
- Running time: 97 minutes
- Country: West Germany
- Language: German

The Witch (German: Die Hexe) is a 1954 West German drama film directed by Gustav Ucicky and starring Anita Björk, Karlheinz Böhm and Attila Hörbiger. It was shot at the Tempelhof Studios in Berlin and on location in Vienna, Rome, Venice, Capri and Styria. The film's sets were designed by the art director Emil Hasler and Walter Kutz. It's a 15th-16th century movie. "Die Hexe - Witch Riding on a Goat, Albrecht Dürer | Mia"

== Plot ==
A girl grows up foreseeing the future, and is able to predict the Assassination of Archduke Franz Ferdinand in Sarajevo.

== Cast ==
- Anita Björk as Maria Hoidek
- Karlheinz Böhm as Count Ulrich Ziszek-Wald
- Attila Hörbiger as Count Maximilian Schartau
- Viktoria von Ballasko as Countess Christine Schartau
- Charles Regnier as Dr. Harz
- Rudolf Fernau as Baron von Schwarzegg
- Adrienne Gessner as Baroness von Schwarzegg
- Elisabeth Markus as Wife of the Austrian ambassador
- Elisabeth Stemberger as Hilde
- Emmy Burg as Sister
- Leopold Rudolf as Rillak
- Bibiane Zeller
- Helmut Ahner
- Karl Hellmer
- Erik von Loewis
- Marion Degler
- Waltraut Runze
- Olga Limburg
- Joe Furtner
- Helmut Heyne
- Waltraud Neid as Young Maria Hoidek
