= A Life for Do =

1954 West German drama film

- German film poster
- German: Ein Leben für Do
- Directed by: Gustav Ucicky
- Written by: Robert Pilchowski (novel); Kurt Heuser
- Starring: Hans Söhnker; Paola Loew; Heidi Becker
- Cinematography: Ekkehard Kyrath
- Edited by: Carl Otto Bartning
- Music by: Norbert Schultze
- Production company: Capitol Film
- Distributed by: Prisma Film
- Release date: 14 January 1954
- Running time: 90 minutes
- Country: West Germany
- Language: German

A Life for Do (German: Ein Leben für Do) is a 1954 West German drama film directed by Gustav Ucicky and starring Hans Söhnker, Paola Loew and Heidi Becker. It was shot at the Tempelhof Studios in West Berlin and on location around Lucerne and Zürich. The film's sets were designed by the art directors Emil Hasler and Walter Kutz.

== Plot ==
Do lives with her foster father on a farm in South Africa. Concerned that she is developing romantic feelings for him, he sends her away to school in Switzerland.

== Cast ==
- Hans Söhnker as Thomas
- Paola Loew as Do
- Heidi Becker as Klein Do
- Charles Regnier as Maurice
- Renate Schacht as Vivian
- Gisela Trowe as Marguerite
- Michael Cramer as Konrad
- Paul Esser as Onkel Karl
- Erna Haffner as Tante Anni
- Brigitte Rau as Gritli
- Peter Mosbacher as Kapellmeister
- Maria Wimmer as Vera
- Iwa Wanja as Wirtin
