= Bert Grund =

German composer

- Born: 24 January 1920; Dresden, Saxony, Germany
- Died: 30 March 1992 (aged 72); Munich, Bavaria, Germany
- Occupation: Composer
- Years active: 1950–1991 (film & TV)

Bert Grund (1920–1992) was a German composer of film scores.

== Selected filmography ==
- Crown Jewels (1950)
- Immortal Light (1951)
- I Can't Marry Them All (1952)
- We're Dancing on the Rainbow (1952)
- My Wife Is Being Stupid (1952)
- Knall and Fall as Detectives (1952)
- The Bachelor Trap (1953)
- The Bird Seller (1953)
- The Immortal Vagabond (1953)
- The Sun of St. Moritz (1954)
- The Witch (1954)
- The Major and the Bulls (1955)
- Operation Sleeping Bag (1955)
- Love's Carnival (1955)
- The Marriage of Doctor Danwitz (1956)
- Between Time and Eternity (1956)
- That Won't Keep a Sailor Down (1958)
- Arena of Fear (1959)
- The Thousand Eyes of Dr. Mabuse (1960)
- The Count of Luxemburg (1972)
- Mathias Sandorf (1979, TV series)
- Die Wächter (1986, TV miniseries)
- Carmen on Ice (1990)

== Bibliography ==
- Fritsche, Maria (2013). Homemade Men in Postwar Austrian Cinema: Nationhood, Genre and Masculinity. New York: Berghahn Books. ISBN 978-0-85745-946-6.
