= Corinna Schmidt =

1951 film

Corinna Schmidt is a 1951 East German drama film directed by Arthur Pohl and starring Trude Hesterberg, Willy Kleinoschegg and Ingrid Rentsch. It is based on the novel Jenny Treibel by Theodor Fontane. A penniless young woman falls in love with a country house and becomes engaged to the young man who owns it, while his scheming family try to break up the match.

== Cast ==
- Trude Hesterberg ... Jenny Treibel
- Willy Kleinoschegg ... Kommerzienrat Treibel
- Ingrid Rentsch ... Corinna Schmidt
- Joseph Noerden ... Leopold Treibel
- Peter Podehl ... Dr. Marcel Wedderkopp
- Hans Hessling ... Professor Schmidt
- Erna Sellmer ... Frau Schmolke
- Chiqui Jonas ... Helene Treibel
- Edelweiß Malchin ... Hildegard Munk
- Egon Brosig ... Leutnant Vogelsang
- Hermann Lenschau ... Otto Treibel
- Erika Glässner ... Majorin von Ziegenhals
- Ellen Plessow ... Fräulein vom Bomst
- Fred Hülgerth ... Kammersänger Krola
- Aribert Grimmer ... Friedrich
