= Willy Maertens =

German actor (1893–1967)

- Born: Wilhelm Hermann August Maertens; 30 October 1893; Brunswick, German Empire
- Died: 28 November 1967 (aged 74); Hamburg, West Germany
- Occupation: Actor
- Years active: 1942–1967

Willy Maertens (1893–1967) was a German film and television actor. He was married to the actress Charlotte Kramm with whom he had a son Peter Maertens.

== Selected filmography ==
- Attack on Baku (1942) - Notar beim dänischen Ölherrn Jenssen
- In Those Days (1947) - Wilhelm Bienert / 3. Geschichte
- Nora's Ark (1948) - Willi Lüdecke
- The Original Sin (1948)
- Unknown Sender (1950) - Herr Lehmann - Magdas Vater
- Only One Night (1950)
- The Shadow of Herr Monitor (1950) - Dr. Bing
- You Have to be Beautiful (1951) - Arzt
- Engel im Abendkleid (1951)
- Under the Thousand Lanterns (1952) - Mahnke, Gerichtsvollzieher
- Toxi (1952) - Kriminal-Inspektor Plaukart
- Oh, You Dear Fridolin (1952) - Dr. Mond, Verleger
- I'm Waiting for You (1952) - Hausmeister Wagner
- Not Afraid of Big Animals (1953) - Lawyer Immelmann
- It Was Always So Nice With You (1954) - Hannemann - Elisabeths Vater
- Consul Strotthoff (1954)
- Geständnis unter vier Augen (1954)
- Three from Variety (1954)
- Music, Music and Only Music (1955)
- Wie werde ich Filmstar? (1955)
- Die Ehe des Dr. med. Danwitz (1956) - Ein Verunglückter
- Mädchen mit schwachem Gedächtnis (1956) - Herr Prechtl
- The Captain from Köpenick (1956) - Prokurist Knell
- Skandal um Dr. Vlimmen (1956) - Alter Bauer
- If We All Were Angels (1956)
- At the Green Cockatoo by Night (1957) - Onkel Otto, ihr Mann
- Der Mann, der nicht nein sagen konnte (1958)
- That Won't Keep a Sailor Down (1958)
- Frau im besten Mannesalter (1959) - Dr. Kühne
- Of Course, the Motorists (1959) - Film-Regisseur
- Die schöne Lügnerin (1959) - Count Schleizenstein (uncredited)
- Darkness Fell on Gotenhafen (1960) - Vater Reiser
- The Miracle of Father Malachia (1961)
- The Liar (1961)

== Bibliography ==
- Shandley, Robert. Rubble Films: German Cinema in the Shadow of the Third Reich. Temple University Press, 2001.
