= The Great Lola =

1954 film

- Directed by: Hans Deppe
- Written by: Walter F. Fichelscher; Bobby E. Lüthge
- Produced by: Johannes J. Frank; Wilhelm Gernhardt; Hans Speer
- Starring: Herta Staal; Wolf Albach-Retty; Grethe Weiser
- Cinematography: Karl Löb; Fritz Arno Wagner
- Edited by: Walter Wischniewsky
- Music by: Hugo Hirsch
- Production company: Hans Deppe Film
- Distributed by: Neue Filmverleih
- Release date: 29 January 1954
- Running time: 95 minutes
- Country: West Germany
- Language: German

The Great Lola (German: Die tolle Lola) is a 1954 West German comedy film directed by Hans Deppe and starring Herta Staal, Wolf Albach-Retty and Grethe Weiser. The film's sets were designed by the art directors Willi Herrmann and Heinrich Weidemann.

== Cast ==
- Herta Staal as Lola Cornero
- Wolf Albach-Retty as Carlo Werner
- Grethe Weiser as Nelly
- Walter Giller as Dr. Hugo Bendler
- Paul Dahlke as Emil Dornwald
- Käthe Haack as Agathe Dornwald
- Wera Frydtberg as Tilly
- Rudolf Platte as Jackson
- Rolf Arco
- Das Cornell-Trio as Singer
- Joe Furtner
- Horst Gentzen
- Friedel Hardt as Dolly
- Ruth Nimbach
- Die Novalis as Singers
- Marina Ried as Irene de Lorme
- Sunshine Quartett as Themselves, Singer
- Fritz Wagner
- Die Waldos as Singers

== See also ==
- Fabulous Lola (1927)

== Bibliography ==
- Hans-Michael Bock and Tim Bergfelder. The Concise Cinegraph: An Encyclopedia of German Cinema. Berghahn Books, 2009.
