= Ingrid Rentsch =

German actress (1928–2022)

- Born: 4 June 1928; Berlin, Germany
- Died: December 2022 (aged 94)
- Occupation: Actress
- Years active: 1949–? (film & TV)

Ingrid Rentsch (4 June 1928 – December 2022) was a German stage, film and television actress.

Rentsch was married to Hans-Joachim Martens. She was the mother of the actor Florian Martens. She died in December 2022.

== Selected filmography ==
- The Beaver Coat (1949)
- Corinna Schmidt (1951)
- The Charming Young Lady (1953)
- Happy Voyage (1954)

== Bibliography ==
- Gilman, Sander. Jurek Becker: A Life in Five Worlds. University of Chicago Press, 2003.
