= Empty Eyes (1953 film) =

Film by Antonio Pietrangeli

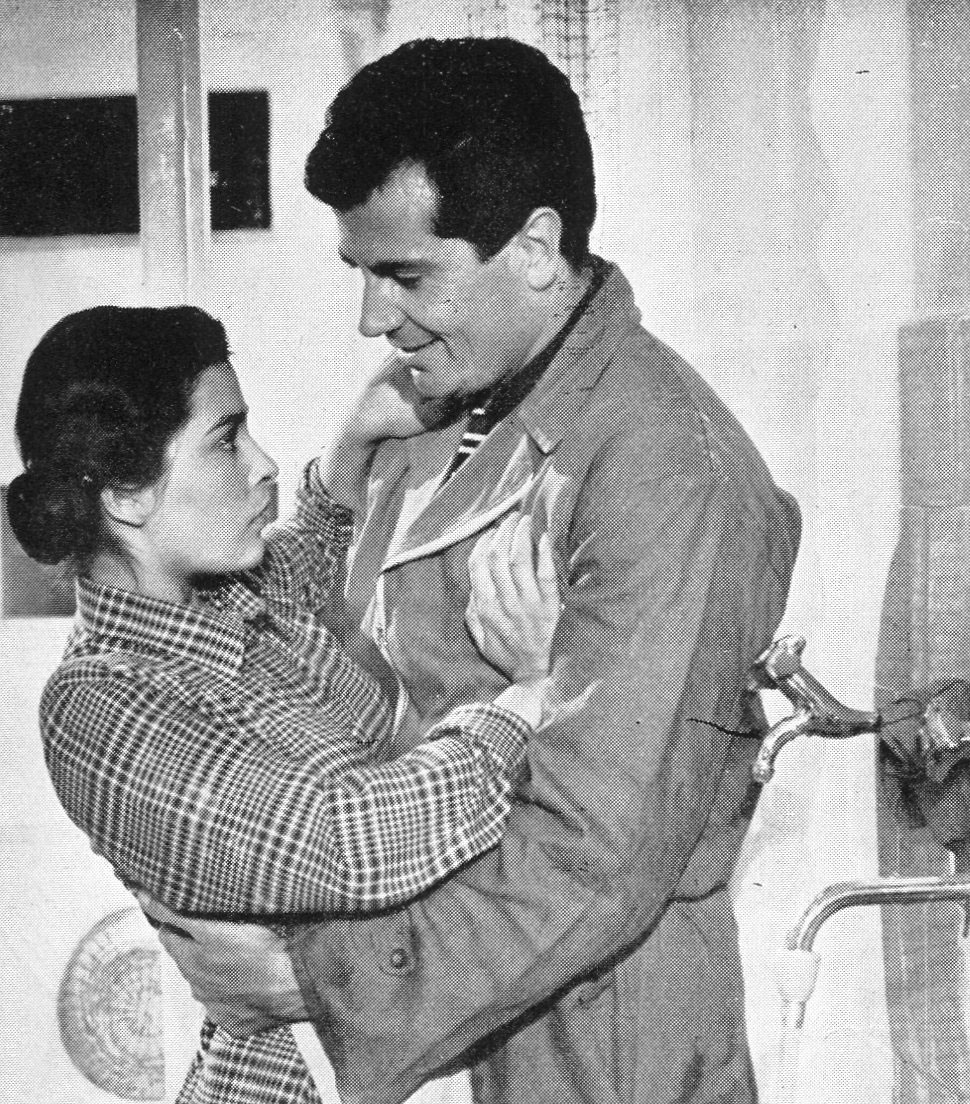
- Irene Galter and Gabriele Ferzetti in the movie
- Italian: Il sole negli occhi
- Directed by: Antonio Pietrangeli
- Written by: Antonio Pietrangeli; Ugo Pirro; Suso Cecchi D'Amico
- Cinematography: Domenico Scala
- Edited by: Eraldo Da Roma
- Music by: Franco Mannino
- Release date: 1953
- Country: Italy
- Language: Italian

Empty Eyes (Italian: Il sole negli occhi, lit. 'The Sun in the Eyes') is a 1953 Italian drama film directed by Antonio Pietrangeli. It stars Gabriele Ferzetti. In 2008, the film was included on the Italian Ministry of Cultural Heritage’s 100 Italian films to be saved, a list of 100 films that "have changed the collective memory of the country between 1942 and 1978."

== Plot ==
Celestina, a young country girl from Castelluccio di Norcia, naive, inexperienced, ignorant, after having lost both parents goes to Rome to work as a maid at the house of a middle-class couple who are moving to a newly built neighborhood. Here she makes the acquaintance of Fernando, a plumber who courts her insistently. Sometime after her, her brothers visit her to tell her that they have sold her house and that they are emigrating to Australia in search of work. Celestina finds herself completely alone in a world unknown to her.

She fired, she is hired by a retired couple where Fernando tracks her down, but she rejects him. Here she meets a police officer with whom she becomes engaged. The two elders treat her as her daughter and plan to appoint her as their heir, but this decision triggers grievances from her relatives concerned. Celestina then asks her boyfriend for help, but he pulls back from her and offers her a cohabitation, which the young woman refuses, abandoning both him and her work.

The young maid then finds a third job in a stately home, but after a promising start it causes a scandal when she is caught kissing in the bathroom with the plumber (Fernando), whom she had been looking for this time. She was fired on the spot and, thanks to a ruse, she finds a fourth job with a family of wealthy merchants. Meanwhile, Fernando has gone to work with Marcucci, who offers him to become his partner, but on condition that he marries his sister. Meanwhile, he continues to hang out with Celestina, but hiding the truth from her.

The family where the young woman works moves for the summer to Ladispoli, where she waits in vain for Fernando, as she had promised, to join her. Here she realizes she is expecting a child. She then returns to Rome to look for him, but she discovers that he has married in the meantime. She meets him again, but, faced with her usual irresponsible behavior, desperate, she throws herself under a tram. Doctors save both her and her baby; Fernando visits her at the hospital and promises that he will stay with her. This time it seems sincere, but Celestina has decided: she refuses to see the man again and will face life alone for the love of the child who is about to be born.

== Cast ==
- Gabriele Ferzetti: l'idraulico Fernando
- Irène Galter: la domestica Celestina
- Aristide Baghetti: prof Nicotera
- Francesco Mulè: Marcucci
- Anna Maria Dossena: Elvira
- Paolo Stoppa: Egisto Marcucci
- Lia Di Leo: Gina
- Mimmo Palmara: soldato
