= Love Has to Be Learned =

1963 film

- Directed by: Kurt Hoffmann
- Written by: Erich Kästner
- Based on: Zu treuen Händen by Erich Kästner
- Produced by: Heinz Angermeyer; Kurt Hoffmann
- Starring: Martin Held; Barbara Rütting; Götz George
- Cinematography: Sven Nykvist
- Edited by: Ursula Kahlbaum
- Music by: Hans-Martin Majewski
- Production company: Independent Film
- Distributed by: Constantin Film
- Release date: 27 February 1963
- Running time: 93 minutes
- Country: West Germany
- Language: German

Love Has to Be Learned (German: Liebe will gelernt sein) is a 1963 West German comedy film directed by Kurt Hoffmann and starring Martin Held, Barbara Rütting and Götz George. It was adapted by Erich Kästner from his own play.

It was shot at the Spandau Studios in Berlin and on location around Munich in Bavaria. The film's sets were designed by the art directors Hans Jürgen Kiebach and Ernst Schomer.

== Cast ==
- Martin Held as Christoph Mylius
- Barbara Rütting as Hermine
- Götz George as Hansgeorg Lehmbruck
- Loni von Friedl as Margot
- Fita Benkhoff as Ilse Lehmbruck
- Grit Boettcher as Dora
- Margarete Haagen as Frau Krüger
- Bruno Hübner as Feldhammer
- Charles Regnier as Regisseur Kramer
- Herta Staal as Nelly
- Ralf Wolter as Regie-Assistent Müller
- Blandine Ebinger as Fräulein Lydia Bretschneider
- Michael Barry as Andreas
- Dagmar Hank as Studentin
- Peter Striebeck as Student Melzer

== Bibliography ==
- Bock, Hans-Michael & Bergfelder, Tim. The Concise CineGraph. Encyclopedia of German Cinema. Berghahn Books, 2009.
