= Walter Kutz =

German art director (1904–1983)

- Born: 17 January 1904; Berlin, German Empire
- Died: 11 August 1983 (aged 79); West Berlin, West Germany
- Occupation: Art director
- Years active: 1939-1969

Walter Kutz (1904 – 1983) was a German art director.

== Selected filmography ==
- Nora (1944)
- Dreaming (1944)
- The Silent Guest (1945)
- And the Heavens Above Us (1947)
- Nights on the Nile (1949)
- The Chaste Libertine (1952)
- When the Heath Dreams at Night (1952)
- The Colourful Dream (1952)
- You Only Live Once (1952)
- The Prince of Pappenheim (1952)
- The Stronger Woman (1953)
- The Dancing Heart (1953)
- The Uncle from America (1953)
- A Life for Do (1954)
- Bon Voyage (1954)
- Consul Strotthoff (1954)
- The Witch (1954)
- Girl with a Future (1954)
- Before God and Man (1955)
- Heaven Is Never Booked Up (1955)
- The Girl from Flanders (1956)
- The Beautiful Master (1956)
- Victor and Victoria (1957)
- Voyage to Italy, Complete with Love (1958)
- Here I Am, Here I Stay (1959)
- The Death Ship (1959)
- What a Woman Dreams of in Springtime (1959)
- The Red Hand (1960)
- Her Most Beautiful Day (1962)
- Room 13 (1964)
- The Curse of the Hidden Vault (1964)
- The College Girl Murders (1967)
- The Gorilla of Soho (1968)
- The Hound of Blackwood Castle (1968)
- The Man with the Glass Eye (1969)

== Bibliography ==
- Langford, Michelle. Directory of World Cinema: Germany. Intellect Books, 2012.
