= My Sister and I (1954 film) =

1954 film

- Directed by: Paul Martin
- Written by: Jacques Companéez; Josef Than; Ernst Neubach; Ralph Benatzky (operetta); Robert Blum (operetta); Georges Berr (play Ma sœur et moi); Louis Verneuil (play Ma sœur et moi)
- Produced by: Artur Brauner; Léon Canel
- Starring: Sonja Ziemann; Adrian Hoven; Herta Staal
- Cinematography: Albert Benitz
- Edited by: Martha Dübber
- Music by: Ralph Benatzky; Friedrich Schröder
- Production company: CCC Film
- Distributed by: Gloria Film
- Release date: 15 June 1954
- Running time: 83 minutes
- Country: West Germany
- Language: German

My Sister and I (German: Meine Schwester und ich) is a 1954 West German musical film directed by Paul Martin and starring Sonja Ziemann, Adrian Hoven and Herta Staal. It is based on the 1930 stage work of the same name.

It was filmed at the Spandau Studios in Berlin and on location in Bavaria and at Weikersheim Castle. The film's sets were designed by Gabriel Pellon.

== Cast ==
- Sonja Ziemann as Christine
- Adrian Hoven as Rudi Becker
- Herta Staal as Irma
- Paul Hörbiger as Christines Vater
- Werner Fuetterer as Graf Kollinoff
- Licci Bala as Baronin
- Rudolf Platte as Herr Huber
- Hans Stiebner as Finanzminister
- Franz-Otto Krüger as Justizminister
- Stanislav Ledinek as Kriegsminister
- William Trenk as König
- Walter Werner as Gustav
- Ruth Piepho

== Bibliography ==
- Bock, Hans-Michael & Bergfelder, Tim. The Concise Cinegraph: Encyclopaedia of German Cinema. Berghahn Books, 2009.
