= Käthe Braun =

German actress (1913–1994)

- Born: Katharina Braun; 11 November 1913; Wasserburg am Inn, Germany
- Died: 9 September 1994 (aged 80); Berlin
- Occupation: Actress
- Spouse: Falk Harnack

Käthe Braun (11 November 1913 – 9 September 1994) was a German stage and film actress. She was married to director Falk Harnack and acted in several of his films.

== Career ==
Katharina Braun was born in Wasserburg am Inn. After studying acting privately with Magda Lena in Munich, she had her first theater engagement at the Bavarian state theater, Cuvilliés-Theater. In 1938, she began working at the Düsseldorf Schauspielhaus and in 1941, at the city theater in Strasbourg, staying there until Goebbels closed all the theaters in August 1944.

After World War II, she returned to Munich and, from 1947 to 1951, worked periodically at the Deutsches Theater in Berlin. She also played major roles in East German DEFA productions, such as Stine Teetjen, the wife in Das Beil von Wandsbek, adapted from the book by Arnold Zweig and directed by her husband. (Note: Falk Harnack was a former member of the German Resistance who had been involved with the White Rose and the Red Orchestra.) Braun also became known for her role as the mother in several screen adaptations of Ludwig Thoma's five-part series of Scoundrel Stories (Lausbubengeschichten).

In 1952, her husband's first film was banned, and he ran into trouble with the Communists: the couple left East Germany for the west. Braun began working at the Schiller Theater in West Berlin, as well as at the Schlossparktheater and elsewhere in West Germany. Among her roles were the lead in Das Käthchen von Heilbronn, Annchen in Max Halbe's Jugend, Rautendelein in Gerhart Hauptmann's Die versunkene Glocke, Electra in Eugene O’Neill's Mourning Becomes Electra, Gretchen in Goethe's Faust, the lead in Saint Joan, and several roles in German translations of Shakespeare; Hermia and Titania in A Midsummer Night's Dream, Desdemona in Othello, Viola in Twelfth Night and Ophelia in Hamlet.

Käthe Braun-Harnack died in Berlin in 1994 at the age of 80. In addition to her man, who died three years earlier, she was buried in the Zehlendorf cemetery.

== Filmography ==
- The Three Around Christine (1936) - Bärble
- Dr. Semmelweis (1950) - Marie Lanthaler
- The Axe of Wandsbek (1951) - Stine Teetjen
- Before God and Man (1955) - Katharina
- Roman einer Siebzehnjährigen (1955)
- Anastasia: The Czar's Last Daughter (1956) - Frau von Rathleff-Keilmann
- Drayman Henschel (1956) - Frau Henschel
- The Night of the Storm (1957) - Beate Hoberg
- Ein wahrer Held (1961) - Violet
- Die Laokoon-Gruppe (1963) - Mutter
- Mein Bruder Alf (1963) - Ellen Borlay
- Tales of a Young Scamp (1964) - Therese Thoma
- Aunt Frieda (1965) - Therese Thoma
- Hocuspocus (1966) - Frau Engstrand
- Onkel Filser – Allerneueste Lausbubengeschichten (1966) - Therese Thoma
- Unwiederbringlich (1968) - Julie von Dobschütz
- Ludwig auf Freiersfüßen (1969) - Therese Thoma
- Einladung ins Schloß oder Die Kunst das Spiel zu spielen (1970) - Mademoiselle Capulat
- Ein Fall für Herrn Schmidt (1971) - Frau Schurek
- Der Verfolger - role of the mother superior (1974)

== Television ==
- Das Kriminalmuseum episode: Die Postanweisung (1968)
