= My Wife Is Being Stupid =

1952 film directed by Géza von Bolváry

- German film poster
- German: Meine Frau macht Dummheiten
- Directed by: Géza von Bolváry
- Written by: Ernst Nebhut; Just Scheu
- Produced by: Viktor von Struwe
- Starring: Inge Egger; Hans Holt; Marina Ried
- Cinematography: Ted Kornowicz; Herbert Körner
- Edited by: Walter Wischniewsky
- Music by: Bert Grund; Just Scheu
- Production company: Victor von Struve Filmproduktion
- Distributed by: Constantin Film
- Release date: 22 April 1952
- Running time: 93 minutes
- Country: West Germany
- Language: German

My Wife Is Being Stupid or My Wife Is Acting Silly (German: Meine Frau macht Dummheiten) is a 1952 West German comedy film directed by Géza von Bolváry and starring Inge Egger, Hans Holt, and Marina Ried. It was made at the Göttingen Studios. The film's sets were designed by the art directors Mathias Matthies and Ellen Schmidt.

== Plot ==
A female journalist marries a chemist and settles down to become a housewife. However, when she decides to resume her old job he becomes suspicious of her activities.

== Cast ==
- Inge Egger as Dixi
- Hans Holt as Dr. Robert Bruhn
- Marina Ried as Elli
- Georg Thomalla as Conny Weber
- Oskar Sima as editor-in-chief Zeller
- Rudolf Platte as Schänzle
- Carla Noltens
- Axel Ivers as Holgersen
- Fritz Eberth
- Ethel Reschke
- Vico Torriani
