= Marina Ried =

German actress (1921–1989)

- Born: Marina Rsjevskaja; 9 July 1921; Moscow, Russian SFSR
- Died: 26 March 1989 (aged 67); Jesteburg, Lower Saxony, West Germany
- Other name: Marina Rsjevskaja
- Occupation: Actress
- Years active: 1943–1985
- Spouse: Rudolf Platte (m. 1942; div. 1953)
- Relatives: Olga Chekhova (aunt); Olga Knipper (great aunt); Anton Chekhov (great uncle); Ada Tschechowa (cousin); Vera Tschechowa (first cousin once removed)

Marina Ried (née Rsjevskaja; 1921–1989) was a Russian-born German stage and film actress. The niece of the film star Olga Chekhova, she was born in Moscow but moved to Germany as a child. She was married to actor Rudolf Platte between 1942 and 1953.

== Filmography ==
Year	Title	Role	Notes
1943	The Big Number	Bianca	
1943	When the Young Wine Blossoms	Astrid	
1943	Tolle Nacht	Marion	
1944	Das Konzert	Miss Kamm	
1949	Der Posaunist	Lilo Deinhardt, 1. Soubrette	
1950	Unknown Sender	Adele - Schülerin	
1950	Gabriela	Margot	
1950	A Rare Lover	Angèle, Zofe	
1951	You Have to be Beautiful	Tilly	
1951	Das späte Mädchen	Cornelia - Tänzerin	
1952	My Wife Is Being Stupid	Elli	
1952	Three Days of Fear	Mieze, Biernatzkis Freundin	
1952	I Can't Marry Them All	Gaby	
1952	You Only Live Once	Kiki Marshall	
1952	At the Well in Front of the Gate	Lilo, Inges Freundin	
1953	The Singing Hotel	Dagmar	
1953	When The Village Music Plays on Sunday Nights	Edith, Sängerin	
1953	Life Begins at Seventeen		
1953	The Flower of Hawaii	Marlene Elling	
1954	The Great Lola	Irene de Lorme	
1954	Der treue Husar		
1954	The Telephone Operator	Lilo Hagen	
1954	The Beautiful Miller	Sekretärin Ursl	
1954	Alles für dich, mein Schatz		
1954	Captain Wronski	Susi im RWM	
1954	Emil and the Detectives	Seine Frau	
1955	One Woman Is Not Enough?	Frau Dr. Schultz, Geschworene	
1955	Du mein stilles Tal	Maria Lana	
1956	Black Forest Melody	Uschi	
1956	Nina	Frau Sergejeff	
1956	The Story of Anastasia	Fräulein Doris Wingender	
1956	Von der Liebe besiegt	Floretta Seduc	
1957	Widower with Five Daughters	Frau Kostowitsch	
1958	Grabenplatz 17	Dolores	
1958	Ist Mama nicht fabelhaft?		
1959	For Love and Others	Grit, Schreibers Freundin	
1959	Morgen wirst du um mich weinen	Bardame	
1967	When Night Falls on the Reeperbahn	Marthe Henningsen	Uncredited
1973	...aber Jonny!		

== Bibliography ==
- Peter Cowie & Derek Elley. World Filmography: 1967. Fairleigh Dickinson University Press, 1977.
