= Her Most Beautiful Day =

1962 film

- Directed by: Paul Verhoeven
- Written by: Horst Pillau; Curth Flatow
- Produced by: Otto Meissner
- Starring: Inge Meysel; Rudolf Platte; Brigitte Grothum
- Cinematography: Heinz Hölscher
- Edited by: Martha Dübber
- Music by: Friedrich Schröder; Ralph Maria Siegel
- Production company: Melodie Film
- Distributed by: Nora-Filmverleih; UFA
- Release date: 3 April 1962
- Running time: 94 minutes
- Country: West Germany
- Language: German

Her Most Beautiful Day (German: Ihr schönster Tag) is a 1962 West German comedy drama film directed by Paul Verhoeven and starring Inge Meysel, Rudolf Platte and Brigitte Grothum. It was shot at the Tempelhof Studios in West Berlin and on location around the city. The film's sets were designed by the art directors Emil Hasler and Walter Kutz.

== Cast ==
- Inge Meysel as Anni Wiesner
- Rudolf Platte as Karl Wiesner
- Brigitte Grothum as Inge
- Götz George as Adam Kowalski
- Gert Günther Hoffmann as Erich Seidel
- Axel Scholtz as Herbert
- Rexi Hegyi as Dan, Helens Sohn
- Sonja Ziemann as Helen
- Monika John as Luzie Ritter

== See also ==
- Die Unverbesserlichen (TV series, 1965–71)

== Bibliography ==
- Bock, Hans-Michael & Bergfelder, Tim. The Concise CineGraph. Encyclopedia of German Cinema. Berghahn Books, 2009.
