= Kurt Heuser =

German screenwriter

- Born: 23 November 1903; Strasbourg, Alsace, German Empire
- Died: 20 June 1975 (aged 71); Ebersberg, Bavaria, West Germany
- Occupation: Writer
- Years active: 1934-1967 (film & TV)

Kurt Heuser (23 November 1903 – 20 June 1975) was a German screenwriter.

Early in his career he wrote Schlußakkord (Final Accord or better Final Chord), a German film melodrama of the Nazi period. After 1945, Heuser continued to work as a screenwriter. He was in contact with many German-speaking filmmakers and writers and took part in the meetings of Group 47. His last work, “Malabella,” was unable to live up to his first successes as an author, although it was highly praised by people like Christa Rotzoll in the Frankfurter Allgemeine Zeitung.

== Selected filmography ==
- Love, Death and the Devil (1934)
- One Too Many on Board (1935)
- Schlußakkord (1936)
- Port Arthur (1936)
- A Strange Guest (1936)
- Condottieri (1937)
- To New Shores (1937)
- Red Orchids (1938)
- Liberated Hands (1939)
- Midsummer Night's Fire (1939)
- The Three Codonas (1940)
- The Girl from Fano (1941)
- Rembrandt (1942)
- Paracelsus (1943)
- The Trial (1948)
- Maresi (1948)
- Bonus on Death (1950)
- Call Over the Air (1951)
- The Sergeant's Daughter (1952)
- The Great Temptation (1952)
- Alraune (1952)
- A Life for Do (1954)
- André and Ursula (1955)
- Before God and Man (1955)
- I Was All His (1958)
- The Forests Sing Forever (1959)
- Every Day Isn't Sunday (1959)
- Carnival Confession (1960)
- Girl from Hong Kong (1961)
- Our House in Cameroon (1961)
- Via Mala (1961)
- Tales of a Young Scamp (1964)
- The Gentlemen (1965)

== Bibliography ==
- Rentschler, Eric. The Ministry of Illusion: Nazi Cinema and Its Afterlife. Harvard University Press, 1996.
