= The Stronger Woman =

1953 film

- German film poster
- German: Die Stärkere
- Directed by: Wolfgang Liebeneiner
- Written by: Christa Linden (novel); Walter von Hollander
- Produced by: Dietrich von Theobald
- Starring: Gertrud Kückelmann; Hans Söhnker; Antje Weisgerber
- Cinematography: Igor Oberberg
- Edited by: Carl Otto Bartning
- Music by: Hans-Otto Borgmann
- Production company: Capitol Film
- Distributed by: Prisma Film
- Release date: 11 August 1953
- Running time: 98 minutes
- Country: West Germany
- Language: German

The Stronger Woman (German: Die Stärkere) is a 1953 West German drama film directed by Wolfgang Liebeneiner and starring Gertrud Kückelmann, Hans Söhnker and Antje Weisgerber. It was shot at the Tempelhof Studios in West Berlin and on location at the Schloss Büdingen. The film's sets were designed by the art directors Emil Hasler and Walter Kutz.

== Synopsis ==
After a car accident confines her to a wheelchair and halts her career, an opera singer suspects that her architect husband has begun an affair with an attractive young interior designer he has met.

== Cast ==
- Gertrud Kückelmann as Sybille Erler
- Hans Söhnker as Jochen Faber
- Antje Weisgerber as Elisabeth Faber
- Paul Henckels as Draaden
- Tilly Lauenstein as Dr. Hanna Claassen
- Tilla Durieux as Mutter der Fürstin
- Heinz Klingenberg as Fürst von Hartefeld-Rosenau
- Elsa Wagner as Frau Prein
- Maria Sebaldt as Hertha
- Harald Juhnke as Alfred
- Lou Seitz as Frau Huber
- Paul Bildt as Professor Wolters
- Emil Suhrmann as Lawyer Medemann
- Richard Handwerk as Waisenhausdirektor
- Rita Streich as herself - singer
- Ernst Legal as walker
- Wolfgang Liebeneiner as conductor
