= The Beautiful Master =

- Directed by: Rudolf Schündler
- Written by: Fritz Böttger; Werner Eplinius; Janne Furch; F.M. Schilder
- Produced by: Artur Brauner; Waldemar Frank; Helmut Ungerland
- Starring: Herta Staal; Paul Bösiger; Walter Gross
- Cinematography: Karl Löb
- Edited by: Margarete Steinborn
- Music by: Gerhard Winkler
- Production companies: Alfu-Film; Central-Europa Film
- Distributed by: Europa-Filmverleih
- Release date: 6 December 1956
- Running time: 96 minutes
- Country: West Germany
- Language: German

The Beautiful Master (German: Die schöne Meisterin) is a 1956 West German comedy film directed by Rudolf Schündler and starring Herta Staal, Paul Bösiger and Walter Gross.

The film's sets were designed by the art directors Emil Hasler and Walter Kutz. It was shot at the Spandau Studios in Berlin and on location around the Chiemsee in Bavaria.

== Cast ==
- Herta Staal as Kathrin
- Paul Bösiger as Peter
- Walter Gross as Rabe
- Susi Nicoletti as Lisa
- Rudolf Platte as Fritz
- Paul Löwinger as Leibl
- Peter W. Staub as Franzl
- Gretl Theimer as Anna
- Helga Martin as Vroni
- Wolfgang Wahl as Rhomberg
- Oskar Paulig as Doctor Wachtel
- Joe Furtner as Landrat

== Bibliography ==
- Willi Höfig. Der deutsche Heimatfilm 1947–1960. F. Enke, 1973.
