= Charles Régnier =

German actor (1914–2001)

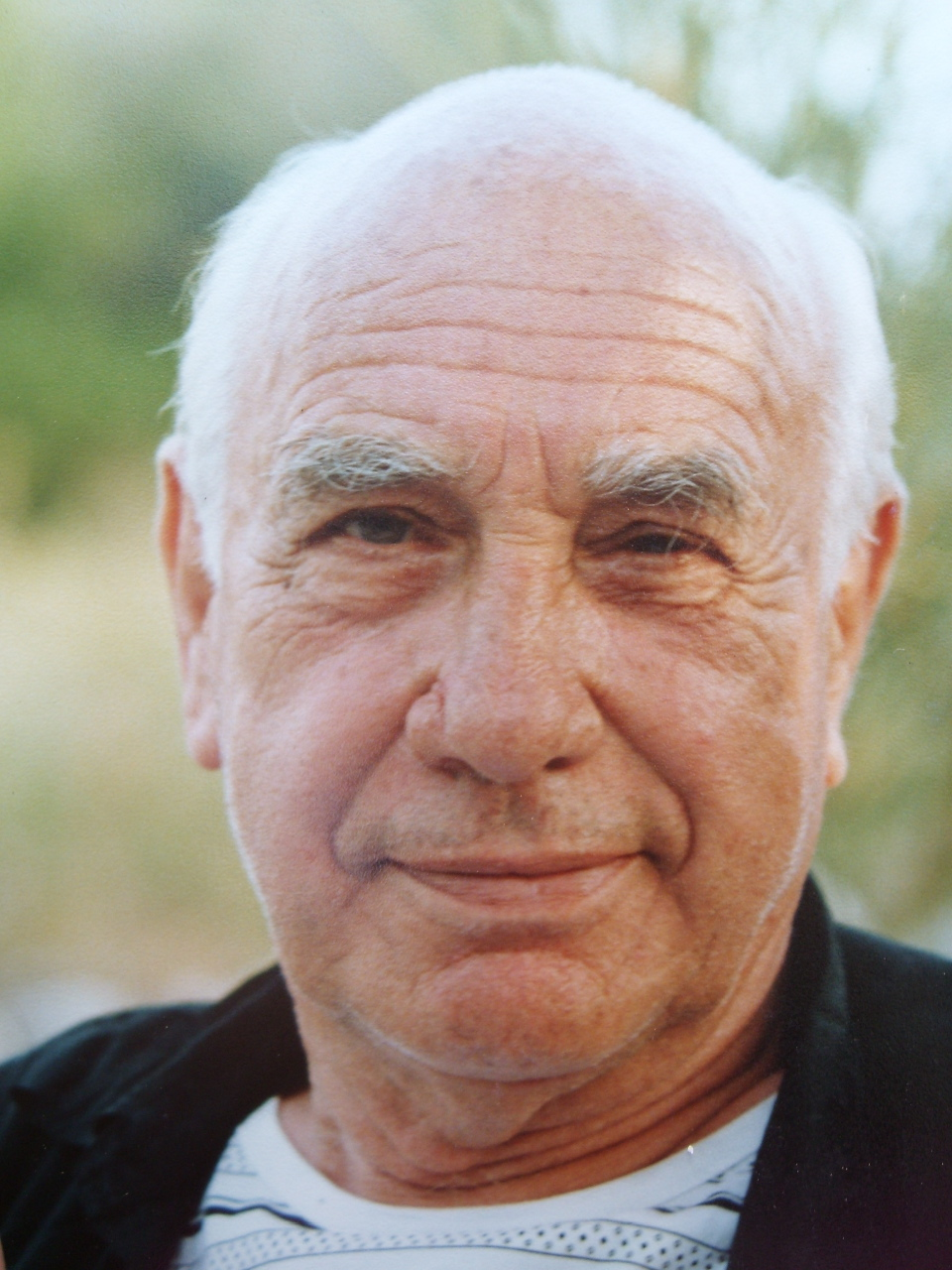
- Born: Karl Friedrich Anton Hermann Regnier; 22 July 1914; Freiburg, German Empire
- Died: 13 September 2001 (aged 87); Bad Wiessee, Germany
- Occupations: Actor; director; radio actor; translator
- Years active: 1949–2000
- Spouse(s): Pamela Wedekind (1941–1986); Sonja Ziemann (1989–2001)

Karl Friedrich Anton Hermann "Charles" Régnier (22 July 1914 – 13 September 2001) was a German actor, director and translator. He appeared in more than 135 films between 1949 and 2000. In the 1950s and the 1960s, he was one of the busiest German theatre and film actors.

== Family life and upbringing ==
Born at Freiburg in 1914, (Note: Some sources inaccurately place Regnier's birth year as 1915.) Regnier owed his name to his grandfather, a native Frenchman. Regnier was the first child of Anton Karl Regnier and Emile (Milly) Maria Friederike Harrer, born in Freiburg im Breisgau. His father was a general practitioner and Charles initially wanted to become a doctor.

Charles Regnier grew up in Strasbourg and Badenweiler where his maternal grandparents owned the Schloss Hausbaden hotel. After his father's suicide in 1924, his mother first moved with her four sons to Heidelberg, and then to Montreux on Lake Geneva. When his mother contracted tuberculosis in 1929, the family decided to move to the sanatorium at Davos. Here, Charles met a number of celebrities, including the writer Klabund, who awakened Regnier's interest in literature and the theatre. Together with his brothers, Charles produced Klabund's comedy XYZ: For three actors in three acts for a performance in Klabund's private living room. His first acting performance was starring as the Countess Y in this piece. "As an actor I never again had the opportunity to play a lady, but often showed how one plays a lady," Regnier wrote in his personal memoirs.

== Career ==
In 1934, Regnier was arrested and interned in the Lichtenburg concentration camp, on charges of homosexuality. After nine months, he was released after he - like many other prisoners - had to sign a pledge not to report anything about what happened in the concentration camp. Traumatized by his imprisonment, Regnier left for Italy, where he opened a souvenir store in Portofino. As the business brought in little, Regnier returned to Berlin and completed a private acting course there. Regnier's first engagement was in 1938 at the theatre at Greifswald, where he met actress and singer Pamela Wedekind, a daughter of the playwright Frank Wedekind. They married on 21 June 1941 in Berlin. In 1941, Regnier was invited by Otto Falckenberg to join the ensemble of the Munich Kammerspiele, where he remained until 1958. From 1946, Regnier worked as a drama teacher at the newly founded Otto-Falckenberg-Schule.

From 1961 to 1962, he was an ensemble member of the Wiener Burgtheater. Regnier preferred not to make a distinction between high art performances and entertainment, saying, "The public should find my work effective, entertaining, in short: agreeable."

Regnier lived in Germany, Italy and Switzerland. He died on 13 September 2001 after suffering a stroke in Bad Wiessee. He was buried in the Badenweiler-Lipburg cemetery, close to his childhood home.

His literary estate can be found in the archives of the Academy of the Arts in Berlin.

== Selected filmography ==
- Das Geheimnis der roten Katze (1949)
- The Last Illusion (1949), as Bertram
- Royal Children (1950), as Count Larissa
- Die Tat des Anderen (1951)
- Decision Before Dawn (1951), as German Prisoner (uncredited)
- Captive Soul (1952)
- My Name is Niki (1952), as Newspaper editor Claus
- The Sergeant's Daughter (1952)
- The Chaplain of San Lorenzo (1953), as Police detective Morro
- Street Serenade (1953), as Sachetti
- A Life for Do (1954), as Maurice
- Cabaret (1954), as Music critic
- Sauerbruch – Das war mein Leben (1954), as Head of the psychiatric section
- Consul Strotthoff (1954), as Conrad Eylers
- Clivia (1954)
- Captain Wronski (1954), as Judge of the Volksgerichtshof
- The Witch (1954), as Dr. Harz
- The Phantom of the Big Tent (1954)
- Canaris (1954), as Baron Trenti
- Secrets of the City (1955), as Morton
- Hello, My Name is Cox (1955), as Police detective Carter
- Ein Mann vergißt die Liebe (1955)
- Oasis (1955), as Van Grouten
- Heroism after Hours (1955), as Marro the Magican (segment "Der Zauberer Maro")
- Heaven Is Never Booked Up (1955), as Borelli
- The Ambassador's Wife (1955), as Legationsrat Mattusch
- Island of the Dead (1955), as Father Markus
- Bandits of the Autobahn (1955), as Paul Barra
- Operation Sleeping Bag (1955), as Oberfeldrichter Dr. Kratz
- The Forest House in Tyrol (1955), as Milazzo
- Two Blue Eyes (1955), as Hergentheimer
- Alibi (1955), as Dietmar
- San Salvatore (1956), as Professor Dr. Monthé
- Magic Fire (1956), as Giacomo Meyerbeer
- Beichtgeheimnis (1956), as Stadtrat Praun
- My Husband's Getting Married Today (1956), as Niki Springer
- Kitty and the Great Big World (1956), as Monsieur Jeannot
- The Story of Anastasia (1956)
- A Heart Returns Home (1956), as Boerner
- Queen Louise (1957), as Talleyrand
- The Power and the Glory (1957, TV film), as The Governor's Cousin
- Beneath the Palms on the Blue Sea (1957), as Cesare, the Contessa's butler
- Der geheimnisvolle Dr. Mander (1957, TV film), as David West
- Banktresor 713 (1957), as Hartmann
- El Hakim (1957), as Dr. Kolali
- Der Page vom Palast-Hotel (1958), as Richard Allhard
- A Time to Love and a Time to Die (1958), as Joseph
- Grabenplatz 17 (1958), as Polizei-Chemiker Dr. Wagenknecht
- Taiga (1958), as Becker
- Die singenden Engel von Tirol (1958), as Roberts
- As Long as the Heart Still Beats (1958), as Mr. Kenneweg, teacher
- The Journey (1959), as Capt. Ornikidze
- Dial M for Murder (1959, TV film), as Lesgate
- Joan of Lorraine (1959, TV film), as Sheppard / Alain Chartier
- Court Martial (1959), as Judge Schorn
- The Rest Is Silence (1959), as Police Inspector Fortner
- Die schöne Lügnerin (1959), as Metternich
- Reclining Figure (1959, TV film), as Paul Weldon
- Mistress of the World (1960), as Norvald
- Emilia Galotti (1960, TV film), as Marinelli, chamberlain of the prince
- The Man in the Black Derby (1960), as Herr von Seelisberg
- Le Bal des espions (1960), as Ernst Schenker
- The Secret Ways (1961), as The Count
- The Nina B. Affair (1961), as Schwerdtfeger
- The Marriage of Mr. Mississippi (1961), as Sir Thomas Jones, Minister of Justice
- Bankraub in der Rue Latour (1961), as Camarro
- Chikita (1961), as Dr. Hauenstein
- Ich kann nicht länger schweigen (1962), as Dr. Kampmann
- Der Marquis von Keith (1962, TV film), as Marquis von Keith
- Wenn beide schuldig werden (1962), as Prosecutor Reeder
- The Counterfeit Traitor (1962), as Wilhelm Kortner
- Adorable Julia (1962), as Lord Charles Tamerly
- Lulu (1962), as Jack the Ripper
- Das Testament des Dr. Mabuse (1962), as Mortimer
- Freud: The Secret Passion (1962) (uncredited)
- The Curse of the Yellow Snake (1963), as Major Spedwell
- Love Has to Be Learned (1963), as Kramer
- Miracle of the White Stallions (1963), as Gen. Stryker
- The Black Abbot (1963), as Detective Puddler
- Moral 63 (1963), as Dr. Alois Kämpfer, newspaper publisher
- Banana Peel (1963), as Le vrai Bontemps
- Les Tontons flingueurs (1963), as Tomate
- And So to Bed (1963), as Director
- An Alibi for Death (1963), as Dr. Hartleben
- The Invisible Terror (1963), as Charley Nelson
- In the Matter of J. Robert Oppenheimer (1964, TV film), as J. Robert Oppenheimer
- Der Prozeß Carl von O. (1964), as Defense attorney
- Condemned to Sin (1964)
- Sicher ist sicher (1964, TV film), as Commodore
- Angélique, Marquise des Anges (1964), as Conan Bécher, inquisitor
- DM-Killer (1965), as Ronald Bruck
- Shots in Threequarter Time (1965), as Henry
- Marvelous Angelique (1965), as Conan Bécher, inquisitor
- Code Name: Jaguar (1965), as Simon Walter
- Pleins feux sur Stanislas (1965), as Man with cat (uncredited)
- Doktor Murkes gesammelte Nachrufe (1965, TV film), as Badallas
- A Study in Terror (1965), as Joseph Beck
- El marqués (1965), as Doctor
- Das Leben des Horace A. W. Tabor (1965, TV film), as William H. Brown
- Berta Garlan (1966, TV film), as Klingemann
- The Strangler of the Tower (1966), as Mr. Cliften
- The Doctor Speaks Out (1966), as Professor
- Caligula (1966, TV film), as Cherea
- To Skin a Spy (1966), as Ehrfurt
- Once a Greek (1966), as Petit-Paysan
- Les Femmes Savantes (1966, TV film), as Vadius
- Run Like a Thief (1967), as Piet de Jonge
- Joséphine (1967, TV film), as Talma
- Liebesgeschichten: Nach all den Jahren (1967, TV series episode), as Gunnar Gustavsson
- Marat/Sade (1967, TV film), as Marquis de Sade
- Babeck (1968, TV miniseries), as Kaminsky
- The Duck Rings at Half Past Seven (1968), as Professor Sauermann
- The Animals' Conference (1969), as The General (voice)
- Hotel Royal (1969, TV film), as Sprecher
- Harvey (1970, TV film), as Dr. William Chumley
- Slap in the Face (1970), as Finance minister
- Hier bin ich, mein Vater (1970, TV film), as Mr. von Griese
- Under the Roofs of St. Pauli (1970), as Night club owner
- Der Kommissar: Der Moormörder (1971, TV series episode), as Dr. Strobel
- Preußen über alles... – Bismarcks deutsche Einigung (1971, TV film), as Benedetti
- Die Münchner Räterepublik (1971, TV film), as Kurt Eisner
- The Night in Lisbon (1971, TV film), as Lachmann
- Oliver (1971, TV film), as Finanzdirektor Kaenel
- The Eddie Chapman Story (1971, TV film), as Superintendent
- Der Zeuge (1971, TV film), as Padre Ignacio
- Das Messer (1971, TV miniseries), as George Baker
- Der Kommissar: Ein Amoklauf (1972, TV series episode), as Dr. Förster, Gefängnispsychologe
- The Stuff That Dreams Are Made Of (1972), as Prof. Vladimir Monerow
- Death Under Sail (1973, TV film), as Peter Finbow
- Der Kommissar: Das Komplott (1973, TV series episode), as Jakob Bachmann
- The Devil's Disciple (1973, TV film), as General Burgoyne
- Mordkommission (1973–1975, TV Series, 26 episodes), as Detective Chief Inspector Georg Wieker
- Tod und Teufel (1974), as Lonely man
- Steppenwolf (1974), as Loering
- The Serpent's Egg (1977), as Doctor
- Fabian (1980), as Erfinder
- Shalom Pharao (1982), as Pharao (voice)
- Non-Stop Trouble with Spies (1983), as Mr. X
- The Roaring Fifties (1983), as Igor
- A Man Like E.V.A. (1984), as Yvonne
- Rosa Luxemburg (1986), as Jean Jaurès
- The Passenger – Welcome to Germany (1988), as Silbermann
- Jenseits von Blau (1989), as The Professor
- Cascadeur: The Amber Chamber (1998), as Professor Waldheim
- No Place to Go (2000), as Hanna's Father
