= Carl Otto Bartning =

German film editor

- Born: 2 September 1909; Berlin, German Empire
- Died: 11 November 1983 (aged 74); West Berlin, West Germany
- Occupation: Editor
- Years active: 1931–1977

Carl Otto Bartning (2 September 1909 – 11 November 1983) was a German film editor. He edited the 1959 film The Bridge.

== Selected filmography ==
- One Hour of Happiness (1931)
- The Adventurer of Tunis (1931)
- A Crafty Youth (1931)
- Under False Flag (1932)
- The Emperor's Waltz (1933)
- Typhoon (1933)
- Peer Gynt (1934)
- A Night of Change (1935)
- Hundred Days (1935)
- The Man with the Paw (1935)
- Forget Me Not (1935)
- The Night With the Emperor (1936)
- Victoria in Dover (1936)
- Boccaccio (1936)
- Victoria in Dover (1936)
- Fanny Elssler (1937)
- His Best Friend (1937)
- Seven Slaps (1937)
- Gasparone (1937)
- Nanon (1938)
- The Impossible Mister Pitt (1938)
- A Hopeless Case (1939)
- D III 88 (1939)
- The Lost One (1951)
- The Colourful Dream (1952)
- The Dancing Heart (1953)
- The Stronger Woman (1953)
- Consul Strotthoff (1954)
- A Life for Do (1954)
- The Witch (1954)
- Alibi (1955)
- Heaven Is Never Booked Up (1955)
- Before God and Man (1955)
- Stefanie (1958)
- The Bridge (1959)
- Carnival Confession (1960)
- The Miracle of Father Malachia (1961)
- The Last Chapter (1961)
- The Door with Seven Locks (1962)
- The Inn on the River (1962)

== Bibliography ==
- Langford, Michelle. Germany: Directory of World Cinema. Intellect Books, 2012.
