= Before God and Man =

1955 film

- Directed by: Erich Engel
- Written by: Kurt Heuser
- Produced by: Richard H. Riedel; Herbert Uhlich
- Starring: Viktor de Kowa; Antje Weisgerber; Hans Söhnker
- Cinematography: Karl Löb
- Edited by: Carl Otto Bartning
- Music by: Friedl Behn-Grund
- Production company: Capitol Film
- Distributed by: Prisma Film
- Release date: 27 September 1955
- Running time: 90 minutes
- Country: West Germany
- Language: German

Before God and Man (German: Vor Gott und den Menschen) is a 1955 West German drama film directed by Erich Engel and starring Viktor de Kowa, Antje Weisgerber and Hans Söhnker. It was shot at the Tempelhof Studios in West Berlin. The film's sets were designed by the art directors Emil Hasler and Walter Kutz.

== Synopsis ==
Shortly after the Second World War, Maria marries fellow lawyer Martin who had been severely wounded in action. She believes that her first husband Georg was killed in action, and married Martin, to some degree, out of pity. Several years later Georg resurfaces alive in Leipzig in East Germany and tries to resume their former relationship, but Maria comes to realise that it is Martin that she truly loves.

== Cast ==
- Viktor de Kowa as Martin
- Antje Weisgerber as Maria
- Hans Söhnker as Georg
- Käthe Braun as Katharina
- Emmy Burg as Anna Mechala
- Werner Peters as Anton Mechala
- Hilde Sessak as Ida Jucharz
- Trude Berliner as Frau Vikarin
- Gerhard Bienert as Wachtmeister
- Maly Delschaft as Dienstmädchen Lina
- Erich Dunskus as Richter
- Hans Hessling as Vogel, Trompeter
- Karl Klüsner as Geistlicher
- Franz-Otto Krüger as Verkehrspolizist
- Klaus Miedel as Staatsanwalt
- Hans Stiebner as Mann beim Barbier
- Elsa Wagner as Schwester Else

== Bibliography ==
- Bock, Hans-Michael & Bergfelder, Tim. The Concise CineGraph. Encyclopedia of German Cinema. Berghahn Books, 2009.
- Elsaesser, Thomas & Wedel, Michael . The BFI companion to German cinema. British Film Institute, 1999.
