= The Story of Anastasia =

1956 film

The Story of Anastasia (US) Is Anna Anderson Anastasia? (UK)
- Directed by: Falk Harnack
- Screenplay by: Herbert Reinecker
- Produced by: Günter Matern
- Starring: Lilli Palmer; Ivan Desny
- Cinematography: Friedl Behn-Grund
- Edited by: Kurt Zeunert
- Music by: Herbert Trantow
- Production companies: Alfu-Film; Corona Filmproduktion; Hansa
- Distributed by: Deutsche London Film
- Release date: 27 September 1956 (West Germany)
- Running time: 107 minutes
- Country: West Germany
- Language: German

The Story of Anastasia and in the UK, Is Anna Anderson Anastasia? (German: Anastasia, die letzte Zarentochter), is a German film directed by Falk Harnack. The 1956 film is based on the true story of Anna Anderson, who was pulled from the Landwehr Canal in Berlin in 1920 and later claimed to be Anastasia, the youngest daughter of Tsar Nicholas II of Russia. The entire family was executed in the Bolshevik Revolution, but this was not confirmed until their graves were discovered in 1991 and 2007.

The American film Anastasia, directed by Anatole Litvak and featuring Ingrid Bergman appeared the same year. Both films feature actor Ivan Desny.

== Cast ==
- Lilli Palmer as Anna Anderson / Anastasia
- Ivan Desny as Gleb Botkin
- Rudolf Fernau as Serge Botkin
- Tilla Durieux as the Tsar's mother
- Dorothea Wieck as Grand Duchess Olga Romanov
- Ellen Schwiers as Princess Katharina (Xenia Leeds)
- Käthe Braun as Frau von Rathleff-Keilmann
- Margot Hielscher as Crown Princess Cecilie
- Otto Graf as Duke of Leuchtenberg
- Franziska Kinz as Duchess of Leuchtenberg
- Hans Krull as Friedrich Ernst, Prince of Saxon-Altenburg
- Adelheid Seeck as Princess Irene of Prussia
- Fritz Tillmann as Baron von Pleskau
- Alice Treff as Baroness von Seekendorf
- Erik von Loewis as Baron Valepp
- Susanne von Almassy as Frau Stevens
- Eva Bubat as Gertrud Schanzkowsky
- Berta Drews as Fräulein Peuthert
- Maria Sebaldt as Trollop
- Reinhold Bernt as Landpoliceman
- Paul Bildt as Volkov
- Emmy Burg as Nurse Schwarzkopf
- Peter Carsten as Soldier Tchaikovski
- Erika Dannhoff as Frau von Pleskau
- Fritz Eberth as Yurovski
- Kurt Heintel as Kotov
- Lucie Höflich as Frau Bäumle
- Karl Klüsner as Dr. Kersten
- Reinhard Kolldehoff as Fichte
- Stanislav Ledinek as Voroneff
- Robert Meyn as German lawyer
- Marina Ried as Doris Wingender
- Traute Rose as Charwoman
- Edgar Ott as Ranger
- Peter Capell
- Wolf Martini
- Werner Peters
- Wolfgang Preiss
- Charles Regnier
- Helmuth Rudolph
- Ernst Schröder
- Siegfried Schürenberg
- Paul Wagner
- Kurt Weitkamp
- Dieter Zeidler
