= Island of the Dead (1955 film) =

1955 film directed by Viktor Tourjansky

- Directed by: Viktor Tourjansky
- Written by: Hans-Ulrich Horster (novel); Victor De Fast; Juliane Kay; Erich Kröhnke; Viktor Tourjansky; Lore Stapenhorst
- Produced by: Herbert O. Horn
- Starring: Willy Birgel; Inge Egger; Folke Sundquist
- Cinematography: Günther Anders
- Edited by: Walter Fredersdorf
- Music by: Hans-Otto Borgmann
- Production company: Unicorn Film
- Distributed by: Neue Filmverleih
- Release date: 23 August 1955
- Running time: 97 minutes
- Country: West Germany
- Language: German

Island of the Dead (German: Die Toteninsel) is a 1955 West German drama film directed by Viktor Tourjansky and starring Willy Birgel, Inge Egger and Folke Sundquist. It was shot at the Bavaria Studios in Munich. The film's sets were designed by the art director Dieter Bartels and Wilhelm Vorwerg. It premiered at the Marmorhaus in Berlin.

== Cast ==
- Willy Birgel as Frank
- Inge Egger as Maria
- Folke Sundquist as Stefan
- Charles Regnier as Pater Markus
- Paul Esser as Fritz Kahlmayer
- Karin Hardt as Erna Kahlmayer
- Alexander Kerst as Dr. Henry Gordon
- Jeanette Schultze as Luise Garbusch
- Petra Peters as Gisela
- Robert Meyn as Kapitän
- Joseph Offenbach as Dr. Gabin
- Michael Cramer as von Bargen
- Hilde Körber as Frau Hürti
- Ingrid Stenn as Nicolette
- Karl-Heinz Peters as Konstantin

== Bibliography ==
- Hans-Michael Bock and Tim Bergfelder. The Concise Cinegraph: An Encyclopedia of German Cinema. Berghahn Books, 2009.
