= My Father, the Actor =

- Directed by: Robert Siodmak
- Written by: Hans Grimm (story); Gina Falckenberg; Claus Hardt; Maria Matray
- Produced by: Artur Brauner; Claus Hardt
- Starring: O.W. Fischer; Hilde Krahl; Susanne von Almassy
- Cinematography: Kurt Hasse
- Edited by: Ira Oberberg
- Music by: Werner Eisbrenner
- Production company: CCC Film
- Distributed by: Allianz Filmverleih
- Release date: 7 September 1956
- Running time: 105 minutes
- Country: West Germany
- Language: German

My Father, the Actor (German: Mein Vater, der Schauspieler) is a 1956 West German drama film directed by Robert Siodmak and starring O.W. Fischer, Hilde Krahl and Susanne von Almassy. The film's sets were designed by the art directors Otto Erdmann and Wilhelm Vorwerg. It was shot at the Spandau Studios and on location in West Berlin. It premiered at the Marmorhaus in the city.

== Cast ==
- O.W. Fischer as Wolfgang Ohlsen
- Hilde Krahl as Christine Behrendt
- Oliver Grimm as Michael
- Susanne von Almassy as Gerda Eissler
- Erica Beer as Olympia Renée
- Hilde Körber as Souffleuse
- Peter Capell as Robert Fleming
- Siegfried Lowitz as Ruehl, Agent
- Siegfried Schürenberg as Gustav, Intendant
- Arno Paulsen as Herr Behmer
- Helmuth Rudolph as Helmer
- Lori Leux as Mady
- Hermine Sterler as Frl. Dr. Mahlke
- Erich Dunskus as Gastwirt vom Goethe-Eck
- Evi Kent as Die Naive

== Bibliography ==
- Deborah Lazaroff Alpi. Robert Siodmak: A Biography, with Critical Analyses of His Films Noirs and a Filmography of All His Works. McFarland,1998.
