= Music, Music and Only Music =

1955 film

- Directed by: Ernst Matray
- Written by: Manfried Rössner (play); Kurt E. Walter
- Produced by: Helmuth Volmer
- Starring: Walter Giller; Inge Egger; Lonny Kellner
- Cinematography: Oskar Schnirch
- Edited by: Martha Dübber
- Music by: Benny de Weill
- Production company: Arca-Film
- Distributed by: Arca-Film
- Release date: 17 February 1955
- Running time: 84 minutes
- Country: West Germany
- Language: German

Music, Music and Only Music (German: Musik, Musik und nur Musik) is a 1955 West German musical comedy film directed by Ernst Matray and starring Walter Giller, Inge Egger and Lonny Kellner. It was made at the Bendestorf Studios outside Hamburg. The film's sets were designed by the art director Otto Pischinger.

== Cast ==
- Walter Giller as Karl Zimmermann
- Inge Egger as Anni Pichler
- Eva Schreiber as Franzi
- Lonny Kellner as Evelyne Berger
- Suzy Miller as Sonja
- Horst Breitenfeld as Bill
- Claus Biederstaedt as Maurice
- Lionel Hampton as Self
- Franz Schafheitlin as Berndorff
- John Schapar as Pat
- Hubert von Meyerinck as Bieberich
- Willy Maertens
- Rudolf Platte

== Bibliography ==
- Bock, Hans-Michael & Bergfelder, Tim. The Concise CineGraph. Encyclopedia of German Cinema. Berghahn Books, 2009.
- Goble, Alan. The Complete Index to Literary Sources in Film. Walter de Gruyter, 1999.
