= Irène Galter =

Italian actress (1931–2018)

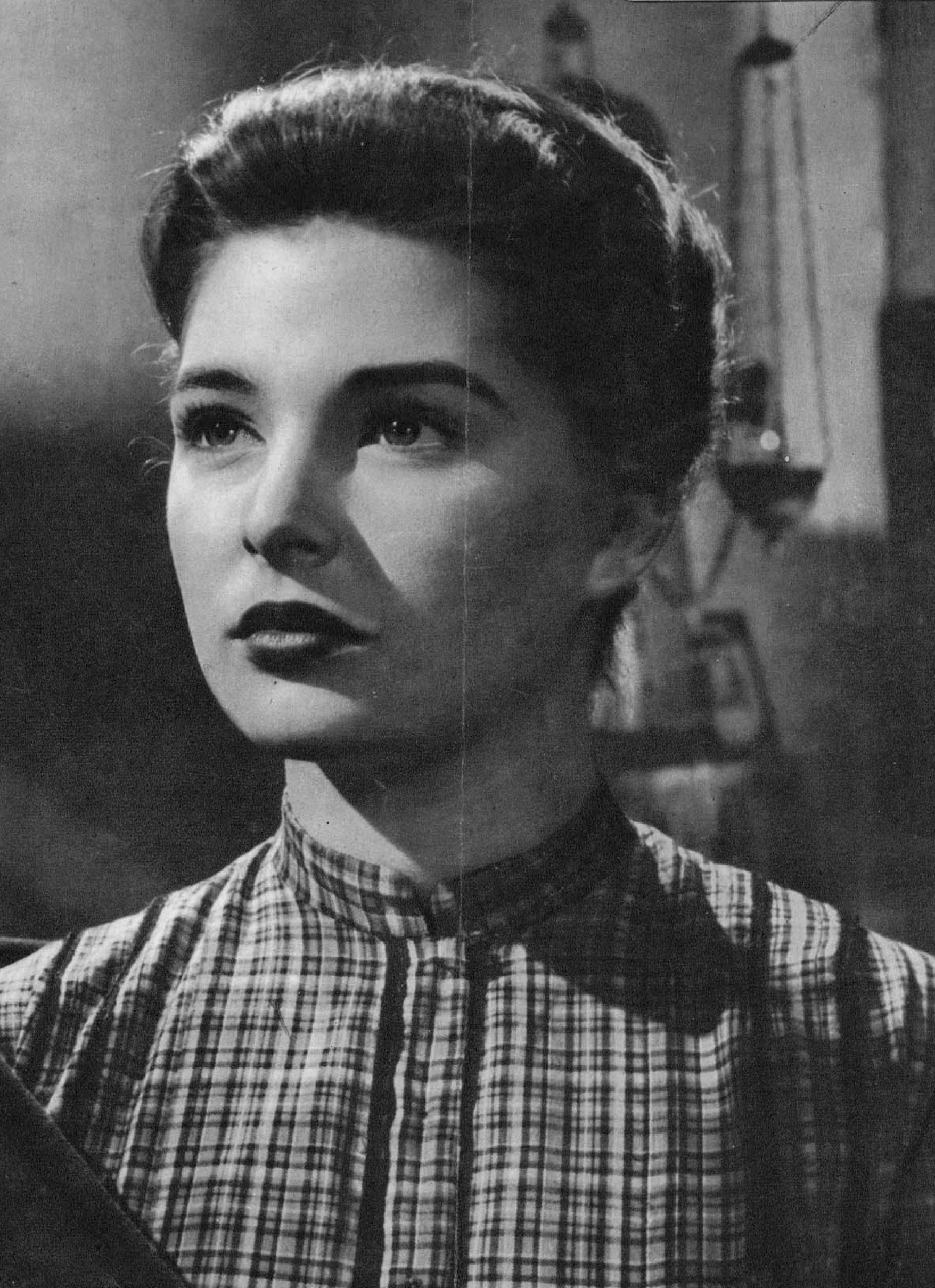
- Galter in 1953
- Born: Irene Patuzzi; 16 September 1931; Merano, Kingdom of Italy
- Died: 7 June 2018 (aged 86); Novara, Italy
- Occupation: Actress

Irène Galter (16 September 1931 – 7 June 2018) was an Italian actress.

== Life and career ==
Born in Merano as Irene Patuzzi, during the first half of the 1950s Galter was called the "ideal girlfriend" of Italians. She was casually discovered in a shop where she worked as a clerk by Giuseppe De Santis, who launched her career in 1952 with the neorealist film Rome 11:00. After a number of successful films, she married the South Tyrolean entrepreneur Otto Lughin and retired from showbusiness.

== Selected filmography ==
- Rome 11:00 (1952)
- The City Stands Trial (1952)
- Falsehood (1952)
- When You Read This Letter (1953)
- Trouble for the Legion (1953)
- Empty Eyes (1953)
- 100 Years of Love (1954)
- Schiava del peccato (1954)
- Songs of Italy (1955)
- Heaven Is Never Booked Up (1955)
- Sins of Casanova (1955)
- Liane, Jungle Goddess (1956)
- Love and Troubles (1958)
