= Heaven Is Never Booked Up =

1955 film

- Directed by: Alfred Weidenmann
- Written by: Hermann Bernick; Herbert Reinecker
- Produced by: Georg Mohr; Dietrich von Theobald
- Starring: Hardy Krüger; Irene Galter; Peer Schmidt
- Cinematography: Friedl Behn-Grund
- Edited by: Carl Otto Bartning
- Music by: Heino Gaze; Heinrich Riethmüller
- Production company: Capitol Film
- Distributed by: Prisma Film
- Release date: 21 July 1955
- Running time: 102 minutes
- Country: West Germany
- Language: German

Heaven Is Never Booked Up (German: Der Himmel ist nie ausverkauft) is a 1955 West German romantic comedy film directed by Alfred Weidenmann and starring Hardy Krüger, Irene Galter and Peer Schmidt. It was shot at the Tempelhof Studios in West Berlin and on location around Berlin and Rome. The film's sets were designed by the art directors Emil Hasler and Walter Kutz.

== Synopsis ==
Four student friends in West Berlin enjoy life despite their shortage of money. At the airport one day they encounter the attractive Italian Angelina Borelli and offer to give her a lift to her aunt's house. All take a romantic shine to her, but to their surprise she is interested in Michael, the shy economics student. When she has to go back to Italy, his academic work suffers. But an international football match in Rome allows him to reunite with her.

== Cast ==
- Hardy Krüger as Michael
- Irene Galter as Angelina Borelli
- Peer Schmidt as Robert
- Claus Biederstaedt as Franz
- Viktor de Kowa as Professor Behrens
- Charles Regnier as Herr Borelli
- Käthe Haack as Frau Borelli
- Maria Fris as Tänzerin
- Friedel Hensch as Singer
- Rainer Koechermann as Tänzer

== Bibliography ==
- Bock, Hans-Michael & Bergfelder, Tim. The Concise CineGraph. Encyclopedia of German Cinema. Berghahn Books, 2009.
