= Susanne von Almassy =

Austrian actress

- Born: 15 June 1916; Vienna, Austro-Hungarian Empire
- Died: 16 February 2009 (aged 92); Vienna, Austria
- Occupation: Actress
- Years active: 1944–2000 (film & TV)

Susanne von Almassy (1916–2009) was an Austrian stage and film actress.

== Selected filmography ==
- The Disturbed Wedding Night (1950)
- A Rare Lover (1950)
- Mailman Mueller (1953)
- The Story of Anastasia (1956)
- My Father, the Actor (1956)
- Stresemann (1957)
- The Red Hand (1960)

== Bibliography ==
- Dassanowsky, Robert. Austrian Cinema: A History. McFarland & Company, 2005.
