= Lost Child 312 =

1955 film

- Directed by: Gustav Machatý
- Written by: Hans-Ulrich Horster (novel); Gustav Machatý; Werner P. Zibaso
- Produced by: Alfred Bittins; Willy Laschinsky
- Starring: Inge Egger; Paul Klinger; Heli Finkenzeller
- Cinematography: Otto Baecker
- Edited by: Herbert Taschner
- Music by: Bernhard Eichhorn
- Production company: Unicorn Film
- Distributed by: Neue Filmverleih
- Release date: 10 November 1955
- Running time: 95 minutes
- Country: West Germany
- Language: German

Lost Child 312 (German: Suchkind 312) is a 1955 West German drama film directed by Gustav Machatý and starring Inge Egger, Paul Klinger and Heli Finkenzeller. It was shot at the Bendestorf Studios outside Hamburg. The film's sets were designed by the art directors Dieter Bartels and Max Mellin. It was the final film of Czech director Machatý .

== Synopsis ==
In the chaos after the Second World War, millions are missing. Ursula, a German mother seeking her child who she lost while fleeing from the expulsion of Germans, puts in a request. Because her fiancé died fighting on the Eastern Front, she remarries again to a doctor. Several years later she sees a picture in a paper and realises it is her own lost daughter. However, her husband fears that the child's illegitimacy will ruin his job prospects. In addition it turns out that Ursula's fiancé is not dead, but has been held as a Soviet prisoner of war. Troubles over the legal case over the girl are ultimately settled, when he falls in love with the sister of Ursula's husband.

== Cast ==
- Inge Egger as Ursula
- Paul Klinger as Dr. Richard Gothe
- Ingrid Simon as Suchkind 312', Martina, Ursulas Tochter
- Heli Finkenzeller as Jo
- Alexander Kerst as Achim Lenau
- Berta Drews as Frau Brennecke
- Jutta Friedrick as Frau Lohmann
- Stefan Haar as Kind
- Karin Hardt as Aufseherin im Kinderheim
- Werner Hessenland as Herr Lohmann
- Hans Leibelt as Rechtsanwalt
- Inge Moldenhauer as Kind
- Renate Schacht as Nina
- Josef Sieber as Herr Brennecke
- Pia von Rüden as Frau Zimmermann

== Bibliography ==
- Moeller, Robert G. War Stories: The Search for a Usable Past in the Federal Republic of Germany. University of California Press, 2003.
