= Ina Peters =

- Born: 11 November 1928; Vienna, Austria
- Died: 30 September 2004 (aged 75); Vienna, Austria
- Other name: Ingeborg Elisabeth Peters
- Occupation: Actress
- Years active: 1953–1977 (film)

Ina Peters (1928–2004) was an Austrian stage and film actress.

== Selected filmography ==
- Bon Voyage (1954)
- André and Ursula (1955)
- Kitty and the Great Big World (1956)
- Charley's Aunt (1956)
- The Spessart Inn (1958)
- Stage Fright (1960)

== Bibliography ==
- Goble, Alan. The Complete Index to Literary Sources in Film. Walter de Gruyter, 1999.
