= Claude Borelli =

French actress

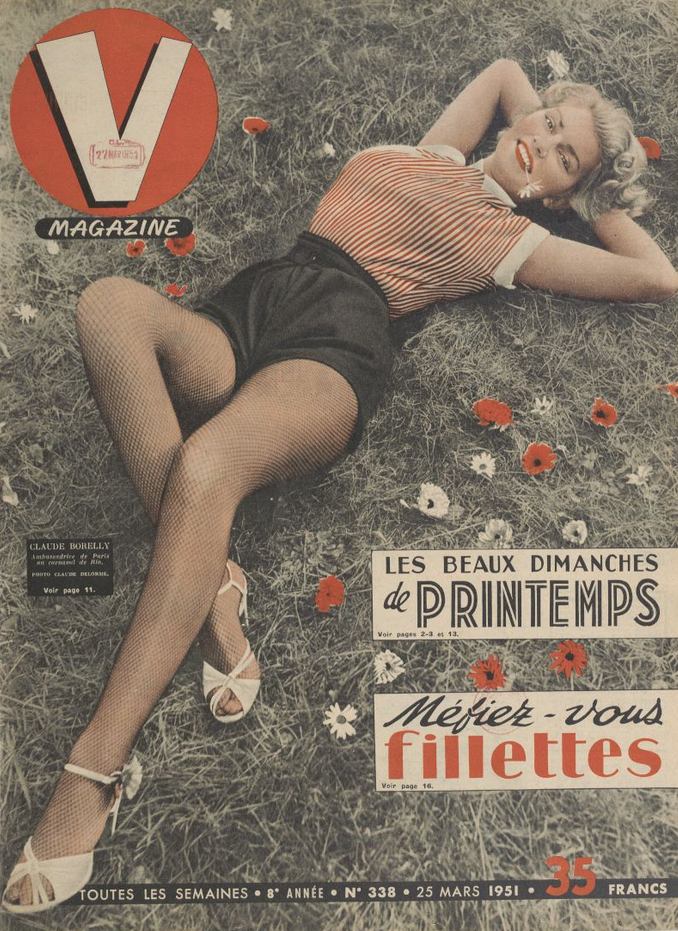
- Born: 14 January 1934; Paris, France
- Died: 15 November 1960 (aged 26); Paris, France
- Occupation: Actress

Claude Borelli (1934–1960) was a French film actress. During the 1950s she performed in a number of films including the 1955 German film Hello, My Name is Cox in which she co-starred with Johannes Heesters. She died in an accident at the age of twenty six after falling through the window of her apartment, on the third floor, while trying to catch her cat which had escaped.

She should not be confused with male child actor of the same name, active during the early 1930s.

== Selected filmography ==
- The Most Beautiful Girl in the World (1951)
- When You Read This Letter (1953)
- This Man Is Dangerous (1953)
- Les Intrigantes (1954)
- Hello, My Name is Cox (1955)
- Les Truands (1956)

== Bibliography ==
- Goble, Alan. The Complete Index to Literary Sources in Film. Walter de Gruyter, 1999.
