= Hello, My Name Is Cox =

1955 West German crime comedy film

- German theatrical release poster
- Directed by: Georg Jacoby
- Written by: Joachim Wedekind; Georg Jacoby
- Screenplay by: Rolf Becker
- Based on: Gestatten, mein Name ist Cox by: Rolf Becker; Alexandra Becker
- Produced by: Carl Opitz
- Starring: Johannes Heesters; Claude Borelli
- Cinematography: Ernst W. Kalinke
- Edited by: Alexandra Anatra
- Music by: Hans-Martin Majewski
- Production company: Eichberg-Film
- Distributed by: Panorama-Film
- Release date: 8 March 1955
- Running time: 96 minutes
- Country: West Germany
- Language: German

Hello, My Name Is Cox (German: Gestatten, mein Name ist Cox) is a 1955 West German crime comedy film directed by Georg Jacoby and starring Johannes Heesters, Claude Borelli and Kurt Meisel. It was shot at the Bavaria Studios in Munich and on location in Brussels and Antwerp. It is an adaptation of the novel Gestatten, mein Name ist Cox by Rolf Becker and Alexandra Becker.

== Cast ==
- Johannes Heesters as Paul Cox
- Claude Borelli as Annette Dumont
- Kurt Meisel as Oberkellner Youmac
- Wolfgang Wahl as Detektiv Richardson
- Nadja Tiller as Vera Walden
- Charles Regnier as Kriminalinspektor Carter
- Dietrich Thoms as Kriminalassistent Collins
- Siegfried Lowitz as Gauner Anton Kraczyk
- Alexander Golling as Gangster Toop
- Rudolf Rhomberg as Barbesitzer Wilkie
- Rudolf Vogel as Nachtwächter Oskar Ojevaar
- Rolf Olsen as Geschäftsmann Hasafi
- Heini Göbel as Chauffeur

== Bibliography ==
- Bock, Hans-Michael; Bergfelder, Tim, eds. (2009). The Concise Cinegraph: Encyclopaedia of German Cinema. New York: Berghahn Books. ISBN 978-1-57181-655-9.
