= André and Ursula =

1955 film

- Directed by: Werner Jacobs
- Written by: Polly Maria Höfler (novel); Kurt Heuser; Werner Jacobs
- Produced by: Carl Wilhelm Tetting
- Starring: Ivan Desny; Elisabeth Müller; Ina Peters
- Cinematography: Heinz Schnackertz
- Edited by: Ferdinand Weintraub
- Music by: Herbert Jarczyk
- Production company: Rotary-Film
- Distributed by: Deutsche London-Film
- Release date: 8 September 1955
- Running time: 80 minutes
- Country: West Germany
- Language: German

André and Ursula is a 1955 West German drama film directed by Werner Jacobs and starring Ivan Desny, Elisabeth Müller and Ina Peters. It was based on the 1937 novel of the same title by Polly Maria Höfler. The film updates the book's storyline from the First to the Second World War. It was shot at the Bavaria Studios in Munich. The film's sets were designed by the art director Franz Bi and Bruno Monden.

== Cast ==
- Ivan Desny as André Duval
- Elisabeth Müller as Ursula Hartmann
- Walter Clemens as Gaston Duval / Andrés Bruder
- Ina Peters as Mimi Duval – Andrés Schwester
- Mária Tasnádi Fekete as Angéle Senard – Andrés Tante
- Denise Cormand as Jeanne Boulier
- Ulrich Bettac as Père Dominique – Pater
- Hans Henn as Henri
- Hans von Morhart as Pächter Boulier – Jeannes Vater
- Ernst Stankovski as Wendelin
- Dieter Wieland as Georg
- Ingmar Zeisberg as Nora
- Christiane Zentgraf as Klein-Ursula

== Bibliography ==
- Hans-Michael Bock and Tim Bergfelder. The Concise Cinegraph: An Encyclopedia of German Cinema. Berghahn Books, 2009.
