= Rudolf Platte =

German actor (1904–1984)

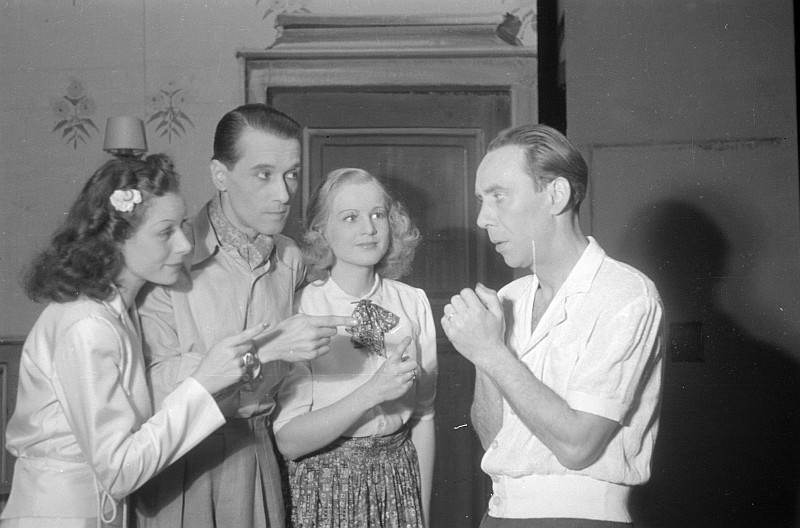
- Platte (r.) performing at the Theater am Schiffbauerdamm, Berlin 1945
- Born: Rudolf Antonius Heinrich Platte; 12 February 1904; Hörde, Westphalia, German Empire
- Died: 18 December 1984 (aged 80); West Berlin, West Germany
- Occupations: Theatre and film actor
- Years active: 1925–1984

Rudolf Antonius Heinrich Platte (12 February 1904 – 18 December 1984) was a German actor.

== Biography ==
Born in Hörde, Westphalia (today part of Dortmund) the son of a merchant, his family moved to Hildesheim three years later. Rudolf left school at the age of 16 to take acting lessons, making his debut in 1925 as Shylock in Shakespeare's The Merchant of Venice in Düsseldorf. Two years later he moved to Berlin, where he together with Werner Finck and Hans Deppe founded the cabaret Die Katakombe.

From 1929 onward, Platte performed in more than 200 film roles, embodying the shy and underestimated, likeable "Little Man". In 1940 he succeeded Ralph Arthur Roberts as director of the Theater in der Behrenstraße in Berlin (right beside the present-day Komische Oper) until its final closure in 1944. From 1945 to 1947 he directed the Theater am Schiffbauerdamm, which in 1954 became home of the Berliner Ensemble theatre company.

After World War II, Platte could continue his film career in West Germany, performing in numerous comedies as well as in literary film adaptions, later also on television, and still successfully appeared on stage in Berlin.

In 1942 he had married the actress Georgia Lind (his second wife). The couple divorced shortly afterwards, but remarried in 1954. In the intervening year he was married to another actress Marina Ried. Both are buried in an ehrengrab in the Berlin Wilmersdorf cemetery.

== Selected filmography ==
- Revolt in the Reformatory (1930) - Erziehungsgehilfe
- Three Days of Love (1931) - Chauffeur
- Zimmer 12 a (1931)
- The Pride of Company Three (1932) - Unteroffizier Knoll
- Das Millionentestament (1932) - Verkäufer Krüppli
- This One or None (1932) - Officer
- How Shall I Tell My Husband? (1932) - Beamter
- Love at First Sight (1932) - Crammberg, Adjutant des Prinzen
- I by Day, You by Night (1932) - Kuchenkellner
- F.P.1 Doesn't Respond (1932) - Radio Operator
- Eine Tür geht auf (1933)
- Morgenrot (1933)
- Two Good Comrades (1933)
- Der Stern von Valencia (1933)
- Hitlerjunge Quex (1933) - Moritatensänger (carnival singer) (uncredited)
- Keine Angst vor Liebe (1933) - Wagner
- Viktor und Viktoria (1933)
- The Sun Rises (1934) - Sauerwein
- Such a Rascal (1934) - Rettig, Tanzlehrer
- Gold (1934) - Schwarz
- Pappi (1934) - Der Mann
- Der Meisterboxer (1934) - Ein Tanzpaar
- Charley's Aunt (1934) - Shipmaker
- What Am I Without You (1934) - Franz Hurtig, Schriftsteller
- Heinz in the Moon (1934) - Arthur Kosemund, Nessels Diener
- The Cousin from Nowhere (1934) - August
- Bashful Felix (1934) - Felix Kaminski
- Der Herr Senator. Die fliegende Ahnfrau (1934) - Theo Keller
- Love Conquers All (1934) - Max - sein Freund
- Grüß' mir die Lore noch einmal (1934) - Theo
- Love, Death and the Devil (1934) - Spunda
- One Too Many on Board (1935)
- The Gypsy Baron (1935)
- I Love All the Women (1935)
- The Court Concert (1936)
- Donogoo Tonka (1936)
- Stjenka Rasin (1936)
- A Girl from the Chorus (1937)
- Autobus S (1937)
- The Chief Witness (1937)
- Gasparone (1937)
- The Vagabonds (1937)
- Monika (1938)
- The Girl of Last Night (1938)
- So You Don't Know Korff Yet? (1938)
- The Blue Fox (1938)
- Woman at the Wheel (1939)
- Marriage in Small Doses (1939)
- In the Name of the People (1939)
- Who's Kissing Madeleine? (1939)
- Twelve Minutes After Midnight (1939)
- The Girl at the Reception (1940)
- My Daughter Doesn't Do That (1940)
- Alarm (1941)
- A Waltz with You (1943)
- The Master Detective (1944)
- After the Rain Comes Sunshine (1949)
- Third from the Right (1950)
- Thirteen Under One Hat (1950)
- This Man Belongs to Me (1950)
- When Men Cheat (1950)
- The Reluctant Maharaja (1950)
- Unknown Sender (1950)
- The Man in Search of Himself (1950)
- You Have to be Beautiful (1951)
- It Began at Midnight (1951)
- Woe to Him Who Loves (1951)
- Wild West in Upper Bavaria (1951)
- Maya of the Seven Veils (1951)
- When the Evening Bells Ring (1951)
- Pension Schöller (1952)
- The Exchange (1952)
- Three Days of Fear (1952)
- Hannerl (1952)
- You Only Live Once (1952)
- My Wife Is Being Stupid (1952)
- Beautiful Night (1952)
- A Musical War of Love (1953)
- Lady's Choice (1953)
- Dutch Girl (1953)
- The Bachelor Trap (1953)
- The Flower of Hawaii (1953)
- My Sister and I (1954)
- Columbus Discovers Kraehwinkel (1954)
- The Great Lola (1954)
- Money from the Air (1954)
- The False Adam (1955)
- Ball at the Savoy (1955)
- Mamitschka (1955)
- Music, Music and Only Music (1955)
- Love, Dance and a Thousand Songs (1955)
- The Spanish Fly (1955)
- The Beautiful Master (1956)
- The Bath in the Barn (1956)
- Tired Theodore (1957)
- The Simple Girl (1957)
- The Zurich Engagement (1957)
- Der Haus-Tyrann (1957)
- Aunt Wanda from Uganda (1957)
- Lilli (1958)
- The Muzzle (1958)
- La Paloma (1959)
- The Domestic Tyrant (1959)
- The Buddenbrooks (1959)
- The Captain from Köpenick (1960, TV film)
- Adieu, Lebewohl, Goodbye (1961)
- One Prettier Than the Other (1961)
- Always Trouble with the Bed (1961)
- Her Most Beautiful Day (1962)
- The Bird Seller (1962)
- Doctor Sibelius (1962)
- Stahlnetz: Das Haus an der Stör (1963, TV series episode)
- Homesick for St. Pauli (1963)
- Destination Death (1964)
- Professor Columbus (1968)
- Gentlemen in White Vests (1970)
- Der Kommissar: Der Tennisplatz (1972, TV series episode)
- Derrick: Mitternachtsbus (1973, TV series episode)
- Auch ich war nur ein mittelmäßiger Schüler (1974)
- Der Kommissar: Der Mord an Dr. Winter (1975, TV series episode)
- Derrick: Offene Rechnung (1977, TV series episode)
- The Old Fox: Marholms Erben (1978, TV series episode)
- The Old Fox: Die Lüge (1979, TV series episode)
- Zurück an den Absender (1981, TV film)
- Veronika Voss (1982)
- Jakob und Adele: Eine Altersliebe (1984, TV series episode)
