= Herta Staal =

Austrian actress (1930–2021)

- Born: 29 March 1930; Vienna, Austria
- Died: 2 October 2021 (aged 91); Munich, Germany
- Other name: Herta Staly
- Occupation: Actress
- Years active: 1952–1977 (film & TV)

Herta Staal (29 March 1930 – 2 October 2021) was an Austrian film and television actress.

== Selected filmography ==
- The Charming Young Lady (1953)
- The Dancing Heart (1953)
- My Sister and I (1954)
- Clivia (1954)
- The Great Lola (1954)
- Girl with a Future (1954)
- Royal Hunt in Ischl (1955)
- Where the Ancient Forests Rustle (1956)
- The Beautiful Master (1956)
- The Bath in the Barn (1956)
- The Winemaker of Langenlois (1957)
- Love Has to Be Learned (1963)

== Bibliography ==
- Robert Dassanowsky. Austrian Cinema: A History. McFarland, 2005.
