= Emmy Burg =

German actress (1903–1982)

- Born: 22 February 1903; Wiesbaden, Hesse, German Empire
- Died: 7 November 1982 (aged 79); West Berlin, West Germany
- Occupation: Actress
- Years active: 1948–1974 (film & TV)

Emmy Burg (1903–1982) was a German film and television actress.

== Selected filmography ==
- The Beaver Coat (1949)
- Homesick for You (1952)
- Bon Voyage (1954)
- The Witch (1954)
- Before God and Man (1955)
- The Story of Anastasia (1956)
- It Happened Only Once (1958)
- Confess, Doctor Corda (1958)
- Adorable Arabella (1959)

== Bibliography ==
- Rentschler, Eric. German Film & Literature. Routledge, 2013.
