= Inge Egger =

Austrian actress

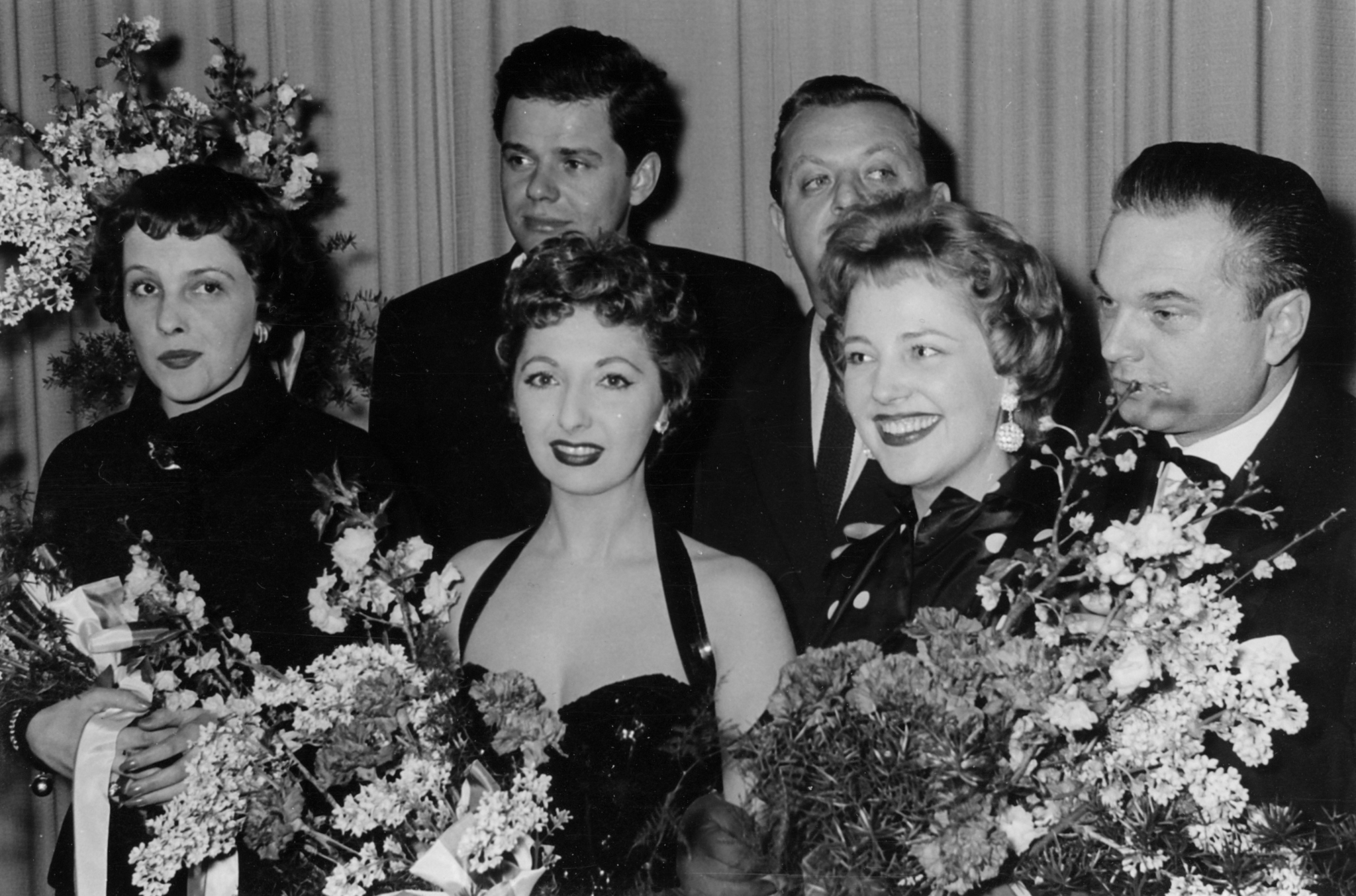
- Inge Egger (left) in 1955
- Born: 27 August 1923; Linz, Upper Austria; Austria
- Died: 5 September 1976 (aged 53); West Berlin, West Germany
- Other name: Ingeborg Gertrud Josefine Egger
- Occupation: Actress

Inge Egger (27 August 1923 – 5 September 1976) was an Austrian stage, television and film actress. She played the female lead in the 1953 operetta film The Rose of Stamboul.

From 1960 to 1973 Inge Egger worked as a medical-technical assistant at the Berlin Federal Health Office. In 1976 she died of cancer in Berlin.

== Filmography ==
Year	Title	Role	Notes
1944	Schrammeln	Barbara Strohmeyer	
1945	Leuchtende Schatten		
1948	The Heavenly Waltz	Ein dicker Engel	Uncredited
1949	Höllische Liebe	Telephonistin	
1950	The Fourth Commandment	Josefa Schalanter - beider Tochter	
1950	No Sin on the Alpine Pastures	Inge Thaller, Hotelsekretärin	
1950	Die fidele Tankstelle	Fotografin	
1951	Wedding in the Hay	Agerl Hauderer	
1951	Eva im Frack	Sylvia Peters	
1951	Die Alm an der Grenze	Zäzil	
1951	Fanfares of Love	Gaby Bruck	
1951	The Sinful Border	Marianne Mertens	
1951	The Lady in Black	Ann	
1952	The Imaginary Invalid	Ursel Daxenmeyer	
1952	My Wife Is Being Stupid	Dixi	
1952	Ideal Woman Sought	Irene Mertens	
1952	Ich hab’ mich so an Dich gewöhnt	Christa Dahn - Annelie Dahn	
1952	We're Dancing on the Rainbow	Edith	
1953	The Village Under the Sky	Maria Firner	
1953	The Rose of Stamboul	Kondja Gül	
1953	Fanfare of Marriage	Gaby Mertens	
1953	Your Heart Is My Homeland	Magdalena Percht	
1954	The Red Prince	Milly Stubel	
1954	Dein Mund verspricht mir Liebe		
1954	Consul Strotthoff	Marlene Roedern	
1954	Bon Voyage	Eva Gordon	
1955	Music, Music and Only Music	Anni Pichler	
1955	Island of the Dead	Maria	
1951	Lost Child 312	Ursula	
1956	The Model Husband	Margret Haber	
1956	Ein Mann muß nicht immer schön sein	Liesel Meixner	
1956	The Tour Guide of Lisbon	Claudia Bronner, Swiss Detective	
1958	Kleine Leute mal ganz groß	Friedl Knopf	
1959	Lockvogel der Nacht	Marion Bernhardi	
1960	The High Life	Madame Onyx	
1960	We Cellar Children	Frau Briehl	
1960	The Young Sinner	Marthe Ortmann	
1960	The Time Has Come	Ruth Calthorpe	TV series, 4 episodes, (final appearance)

== Bibliography ==
- Goble, Alan. The Complete Index to Literary Sources in Film. Walter de Gruyter, 1999.
