= The Bath in the Barn (1956 film) =

1956 film

- Directed by: Paul Martin
- Written by: Paul Martin; Rolf Meyer; Tibor Yost
- Produced by: Artur Brauner; Wilhelm Sperber
- Starring: Sonja Ziemann; Paul Klinger; Herta Staal
- Cinematography: Georg Bruckbauer
- Edited by: Walter Wischniewsky
- Music by: Friedrich Schröder
- Production company: CCC Film
- Distributed by: Schorcht Filmverleih
- Release date: 20 January 1956
- Running time: 88 minutes
- Countries: Austria; West Germany
- Language: German

The Bath in the Barn (German: Das Bad auf der Tenne) is a 1956 Austrian-West German comedy film directed by Paul Martin and starring Sonja Ziemann, Paul Klinger and Herta Staal. It is a remake of the 1943 film of the same title.

It was shot at the Spandau Studios in Berlin. The film's sets were designed by the art director Rolf Zehetbauer.

== Cast ==
- Sonja Ziemann as Antje, Frau des Bürgermeisters
- Paul Klinger as Bürgermeister Hendrick
- Herta Staal as Saskia
- Karl Schönböck as Don Fernando
- Willy A. Kleinau as Müllermeister Klas
- Rudolf Platte as Bildhauer Ule
- Manfred Inger as Jan, Amtsdiener
- Kai Fischer as Großmagd Stin
- Eve Dietrich as Nele, Jungmagd
- Bruno W. Pantel as Bäckermeister Jeff
- Else Reuss as Frau Juliane
- Lou Seitz as Frau Klas
- Maria Krasna as Frau Hasso
- Elvira Schalcher as Frau Jeff
- Eleonore Tappert as Frau Olaf
- Wolf Harnisch as Gemeinderat
- Erwin Walter Zipfer as Schneidermeister Hasse
- Sigurd Lohde as Olaf, Kantor
- Eddi Nowakowski as Mombolo
- Nadja Tiller as Evelyn Korff
- Walter Giller as Peter Korff

== Bibliography ==
- Williams, Alan (2002). Film and Nationalism. New Brunswick, NJ: Rutgers University Press. ISBN 978-0-8135-3040-6.
