= Hans Hessling =

German actor (1903–1995)

- Born: Hans Oskar Richard Hessling; 22 March 1903; Munich; Germany
- Died: February 24, 1995 (aged 91); Bad Oldesloe; Germany
- Occupation: Film actor
- Years active: 1925–1993

Hans Oskar Richard Hessling (March 22, 1903 – February 24, 1995) was a German film and television actor.

== Selected filmography ==
- Joan of Arc (1935)
- Nights in Andalusia (1938)
- The Heart of a Queen (1940)
- Corinna Schmidt (1951)
- Have Sunshine in Your Heart (1953)
- Before God and Man (1955)
- Night of Decision (1956)
- The Night of the Storm (1957)
- The Buddenbrooks (1959)
- Sacred Waters (1960)
- The Last Pedestrian (1960)
- Max the Pickpocket (1962)
- The Priest of St. Pauli (1970)
