= Emil Hasler =

German art director

- Born: 8 November 1901; Berlin, German Empire
- Died: 15 January 1986 (aged 84); West Berlin, West Germany
- Occupation: Art Director
- Years active: 1920–1964 (film)

Emil Hasler (8 November 1901 – 15 January 1986) was a German art director who worked on more than a hundred films during his career. These included a number of Weimar classics such as Diary of a Lost Girl, M and The Blue Angel. He later worked in Nazi era cinema on films like Robert Koch and Münchhausen.

== Selected filmography ==
- Monika Vogelsang (1920)
- Always Be True and Faithful (1927)
- Dyckerpotts' Heirs (1928)
- Odette (1928)
- Diary of a Lost Girl (1929)
- The Fourth from the Right (1929)
- Three Days Confined to Barracks (1930)
- The Blue Angel (1930)
- Twice Married (1930)
- By a Nose (1931)
- Shadows of the Underworld (1931)
- M (1931)
- Hooray, It's a Boy! (1931)
- The Four from Bob 13 (1932)
- Two Lucky Days (1932)
- What Women Dream (1933)
- The Castle in the South (1933)
- Dream Castle (1933)
- Spring Parade (1934)
- Farewell Waltz (1934)
- Winter Night's Dream (1935)
- A Night on the Danube (1935)
- Pygmalion (1935)
- Stradivari (1935)
- Stradivarius (1935)
- The Empress's Favourite (1936)
- The Castle in Flanders (1936)
- The Cabbie's Song (1936)
- The Last Waltz (1936)
- Premiere (1937)
- The Irresistible Man (1937)
- The Woman at the Crossroads (1938)
- Napoleon Is to Blame for Everything (1938)
- Robert Koch (1939)
- New Year's Eve on Alexanderplatz (1939)
- The Three Codonas (1940)
- Annelie (1941)
- Münchhausen (1943)
- Nora (1944)
- Chemistry and Love (1948)
- Nights on the Nile (1949)
- A Rare Lover (1950)
- Not Without Gisela (1951)
- The Chaste Libertine (1952)
- The Colourful Dream (1952)
- The Prince of Pappenheim (1952)
- The Dancing Heart (1953)
- The Stronger Woman (1953)
- A Life for Do (1954)
- The Witch (1954)
- Before God and Man (1955)
- Heaven Is Never Booked Up (1955)
- The Beautiful Master (1956)
- Precocious Youth (1957)
- The Count of Luxemburg (1957)
- The Simple Girl (1957)
- Just Once a Great Lady (1957)
- Voyage to Italy, Complete with Love (1958)
- Munchhausen in Africa (1958)
- The Death Ship (1959)
- What a Woman Dreams of in Springtime (1959)
- The Red Hand (1960)
- Her Most Beautiful Day (1962)

== Bibliography ==
- Prawer, S.S. Between Two Worlds: The Jewish Presence in German and Austrian Film, 1910-1933. Berghahn Books, 2005.
