= Father and Son (comics) =

German cartoon characters (1934–37)

- Vater und Sohn characters
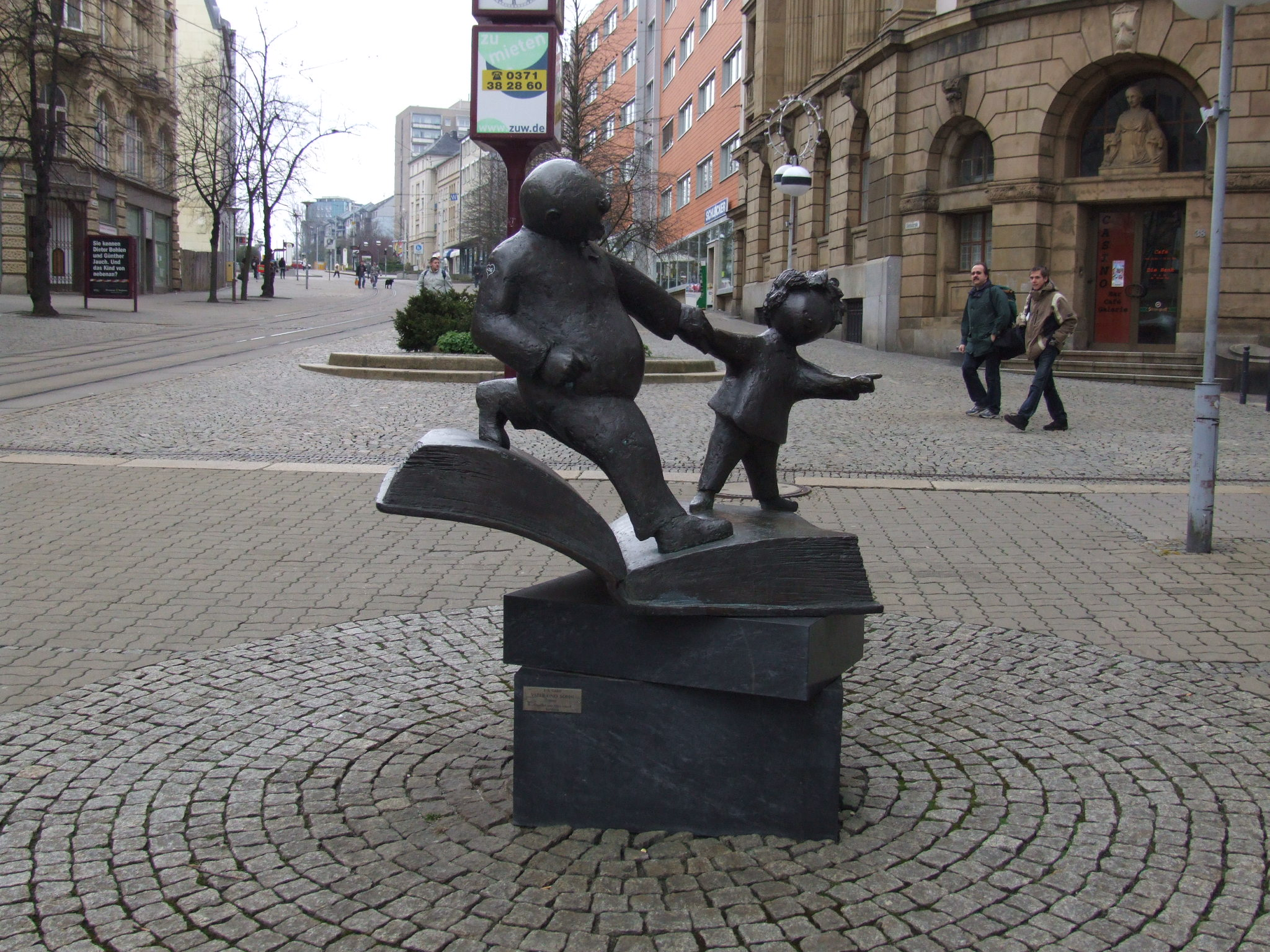
- Father (Left) and Son (Right)
- First appearance: Berliner Illustrirte Zeitung; (1934)
- Last appearance: Berliner Illustrirte Zeitung; (1937)
- Created by: E. O. Plauen

In-universe information
- Gender: Males
- Children: Father: Son

Father and Son (German: Vater und Sohn) are German cartoon characters created by E. O. Plauen (often stylized as e.o.plauen). The pantomime comic depicts a plump, balding father and his son grappling with various everyday situations. The cartoon was a weekly feature in the Berliner Illustrirte Zeitung from 1934 to 1937.

The comic was an inspiration for Marc Sleen's own gag-a-day comic Piet Fluwijn en Bolleke.

== Plot and Structure ==
Plauen used simple drawings to depict stories of a father and his child, such as when the two are out driving and the car breaks down. While the father frets about the car breaking down, his son takes a scooter out of the trunk and continues on. The father follows his example and uses the car as a scooter to scooter forward. The cartoons usually consist of three to nine textless panels, with a single adventure spanning one, sometimes two pages. The individual stories are usually independent of each other, while several overarching plots develop over the course of their adventures: The two main characters come into wealth (Die große Erbschaft, "The Great Inheritance", 1937), go overboard at sea and are left stranded on an island (Zwischenfall auf einer Sommerreise, "Incident on a Summer Voyage", 1937). After their return in Wieder zu Hause ("Home Again", 1938), wealth is no longer a theme. Other characters usually appear only once. Exceptions are Grandfather and Great-Grandfather (first appearance in Die Familien-Ohrfeige, "The Family Slap", 1936), who both appear several times.

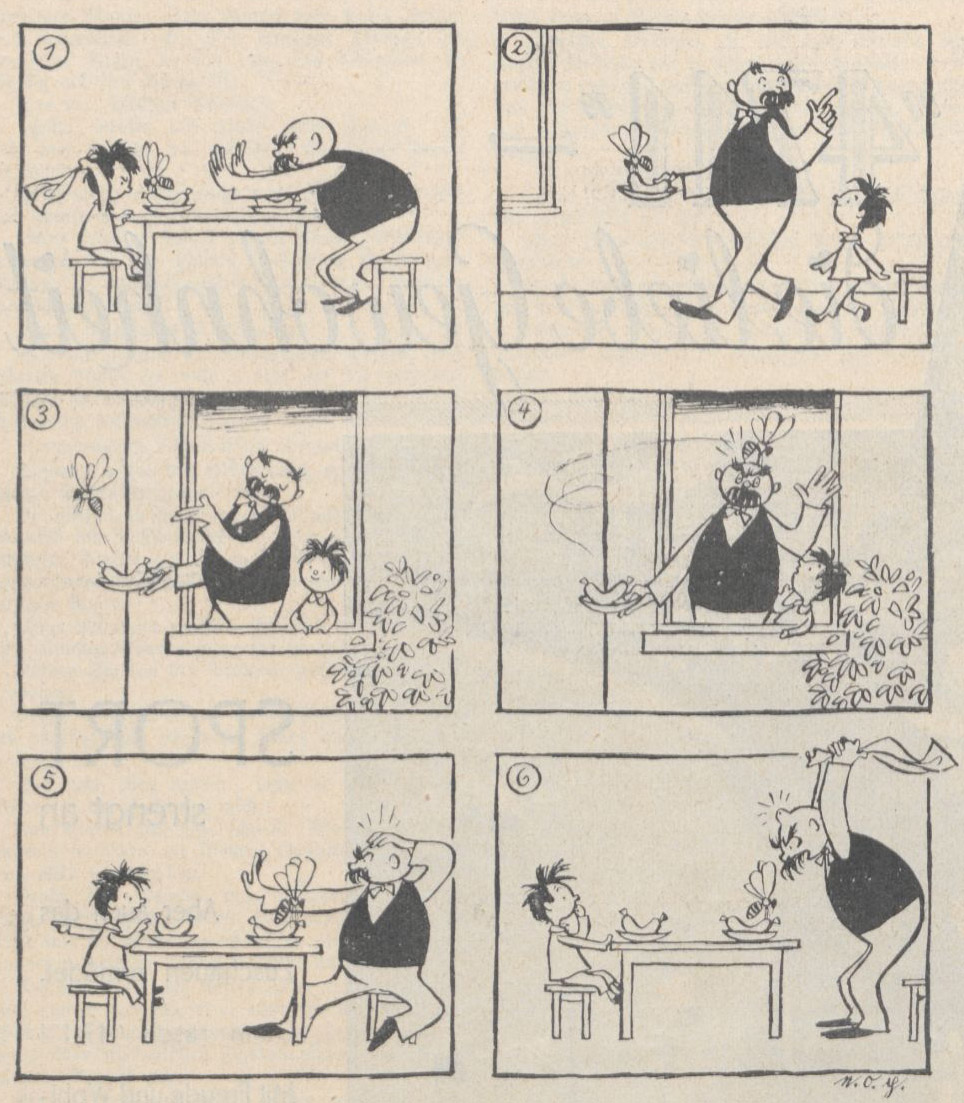
Example of a Vater und Sohn comic, titled "Umgang mit Wespen" ("How to Handle Wasps")

== Origins and publication ==
In 1934, Ullstein Verlag assigned editor Kurt Kusenberg with the task of finding a cartoonist for an upcoming cartoon series to be commissioned for the Berliner Illustrirte Zeitung. Out of the 20 illustrators he had contact with, the choice fell on Erich Ohser, who had submitted several drafts, including one of Father and Son. Because of his political cartoons during the time of the Weimar Republic, Ohser had not been admitted to the Reich Chamber of Culture, which meant that he was under a de facto work ban. This required a solution under which the illustrations still could be published. Thus, the publisher received permission from the Ministry of Propaganda for Ohser to publish "non-political drawings under a pseudonym. This is the reason all of the cartoons are signed “e.o.p”, with the first two letters representing the author’s initials and the p standing for Plauen, his hometown. E.O.Plauen later established itself as his artist name.

On December 13, 1934, the first story of Father and Son, entitled Der schlechte Hausaufsatz ("The bad homework assignment") was published in the Berliner Illustrirte Zeitung to an audience of millions. In total, 157 cartoons had been published in the Berliner Illustrierte Zeitung until December 1937, when the last episode of Vater and Sohn appeared. This happened despite the fact that Ohser had, at times, been banned from the profession in a decision that later could be reversed through the initiative of the publisher, Ullstein. In return, Father and Son had to serve as advertisers for the Winterhilfswerk, for the 1936 Reichstag elections, and for the 1936 Summer Olympics. Ohser ended the series at his own request and had father and son say goodbye in issue 49/1937 of the Berliner Illustrirte Zeitung. In this last cartoon, the characters walk towards the horizon before floating away into the sky, their likenesses transforming into the moon and a nearby star. In the preceding issue, Father and Son had already been depicted as in shock over the realization that they were moving towards the center of an increasing commercialization. In the meantime, other cartoons had already appeared making fun of the long run of the series.

In 1935, Ullstein published a book titled Vater und Sohn – 50 lustige Streiche und Abenteuer ("Father and Son – 50 Funny Pranks and Adventures") with an initial run of 10,000 copies. It contained ten new cartoons along with 40 others that had already been published. The foreword of the Book was from Kusenberg, under the pseudonym Hans Ohl. Due to high demand, the print run was extended to 90.000 copies in total. 1936 and 1938 saw the release of two more books, the second one with a run of 70.000 copies. After World War II, German publishing house Südverlag acquired the rights to Father and Son in 1948. Through Südverlag, which remained the rights holder until December 31, 2014, and various license partners, several book editions stories of Father and Son were distributed in the German-speaking world alone, including some published by the East German publisher Eulenspiegel, so that the total amount of books was soon as high as several hundred thousand.

A total of 194 different Father and Son stories were published. As of January 1, 2015, all of Ohser's original stories are in the public domain.

== Reception ==
While Die Zeit praised Father and Son as "the most popular joke figures of the century," in 1962, Eckart Sackmann perceives "the chosen form" to be "hopelessly old-fashioned, even then" since "in their unworldly moral-uprightness, the strips [...] [referred to the] Fliegende Blätter of the turn of the century." For Andreas C. Knigge, who devoted an entire chapter to the stories of Father and Son in his book “50 Klassiker Comics”, E.O. Plauen "created a timeless classic, behind whose popularity the fate of the artist was forgotten." For Bernd Dolle-Weinkauff, the stories of Father and Son are "a new classic of cartoon stories in Germany," but he does not count them among the comics, but rather among the pantomime strips.

An adaptation of the series was produced in 1960 for musical education in schools: Vater und Sohn, eine heitere Bildkantate nach E.O. Plauen: für Jugendchor, Klavier, rhythmische Instrumente und eine Jazzgruppe ("Father and Son, a cheerful pictorial cantata after E.O. Plauen: for youth choir, piano, rhythmic instruments and a jazz band") by Albrecht Rosenstengel and Paul Diwo.

Plauen has been home to a statue of Father and Son by German sculptor Erik Seidel since 1995: It shows the two figures emerging from a book, hand in hand. The statue was first located at Bahnhofstraße, before being moved in front of the Erich-Ohser-Haus in Nobelstraße. It was donated by Hans Löwel, an entrepreneur.

On September 18, 2017, the acting Minister of Transport, Martin Dulig, honored the city of Plauen with an exemption from the State Office for Road Construction and Transport of Saxony, by which the city may, initially for two years, equip pedestrian traffic lights with the motifs of Father and Son. This was inspired by traffic lights with the Mainzelmännchen, that can be found in Mainz.

=== Gallery ===
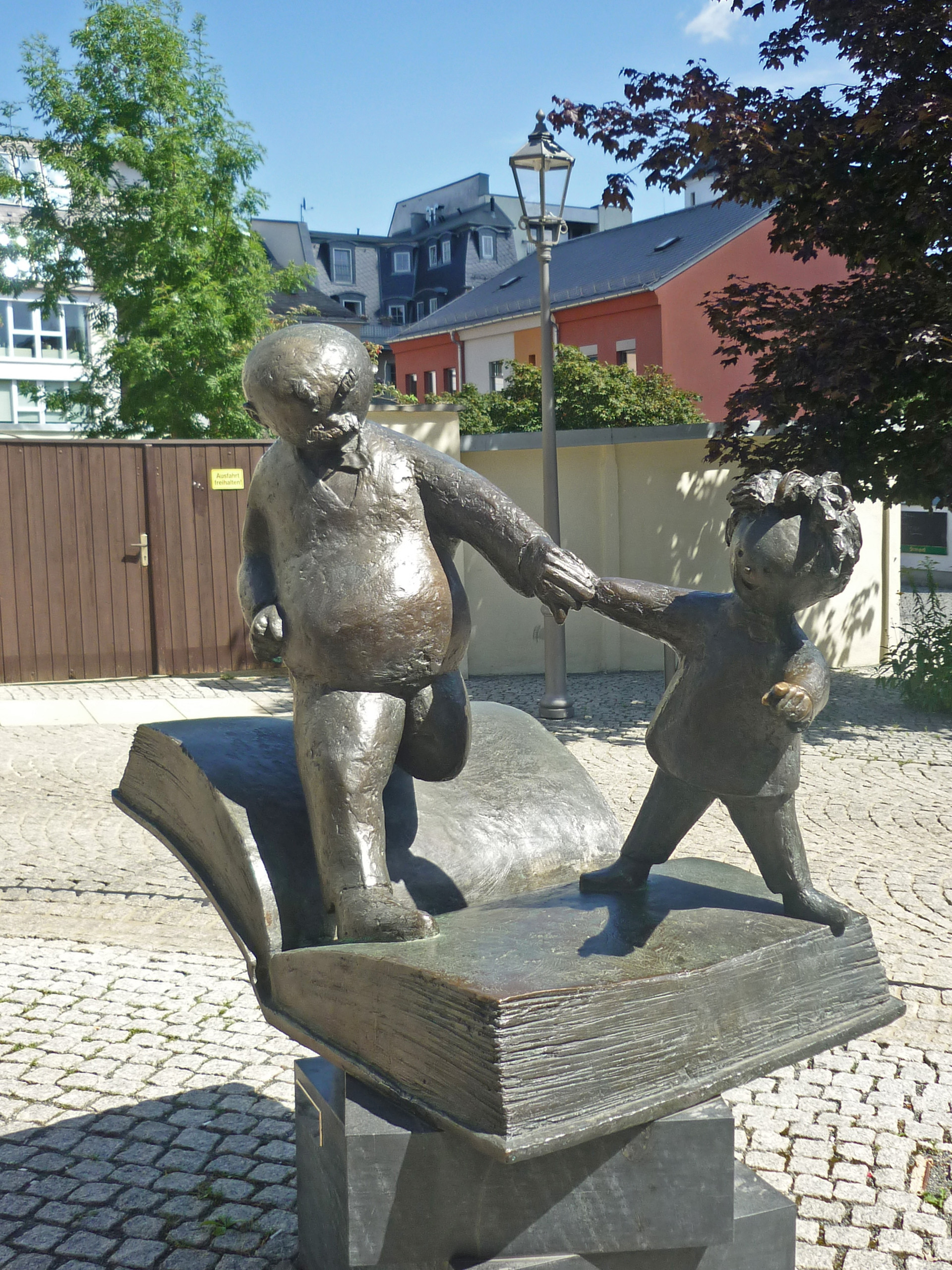
Another view of the Father and Son Satue in front of the Erich Ohser Haus

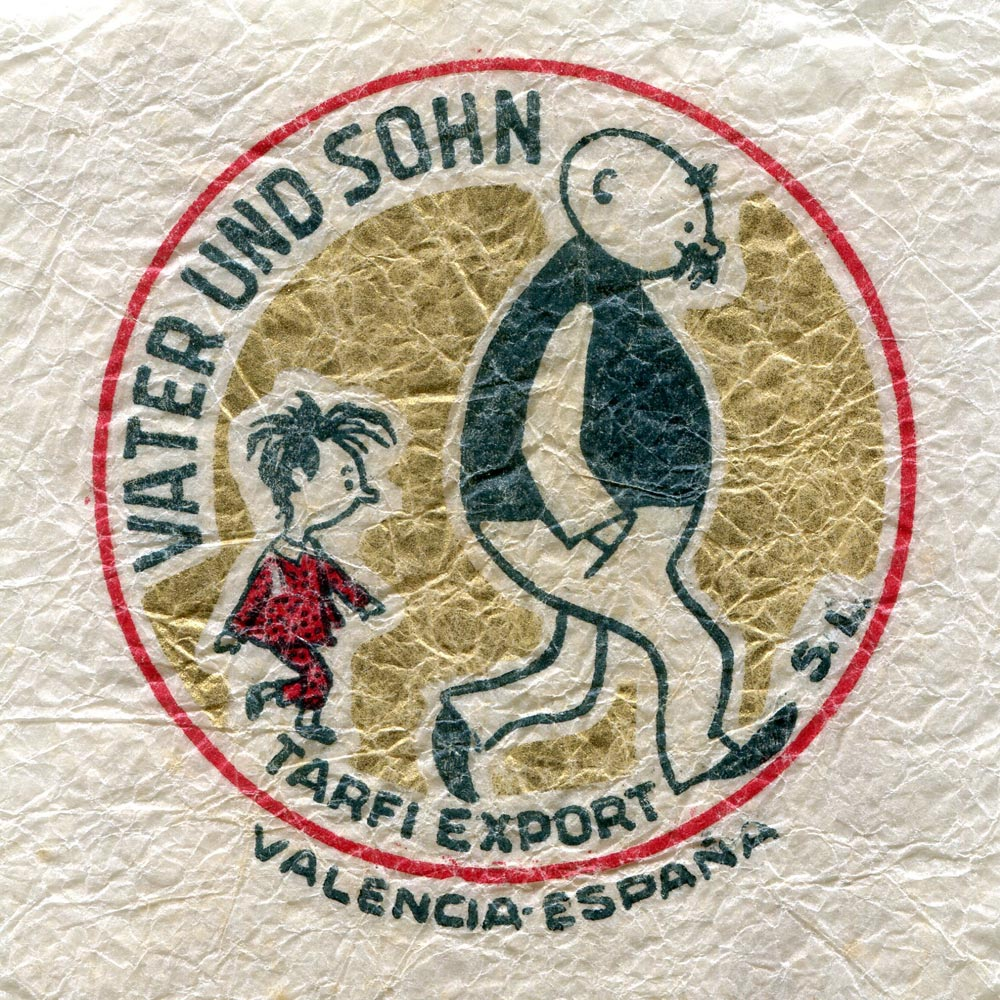
Close-up of a piece of wrapping paper for oranges from Valencia, Spain, with an illustration of Father and Son

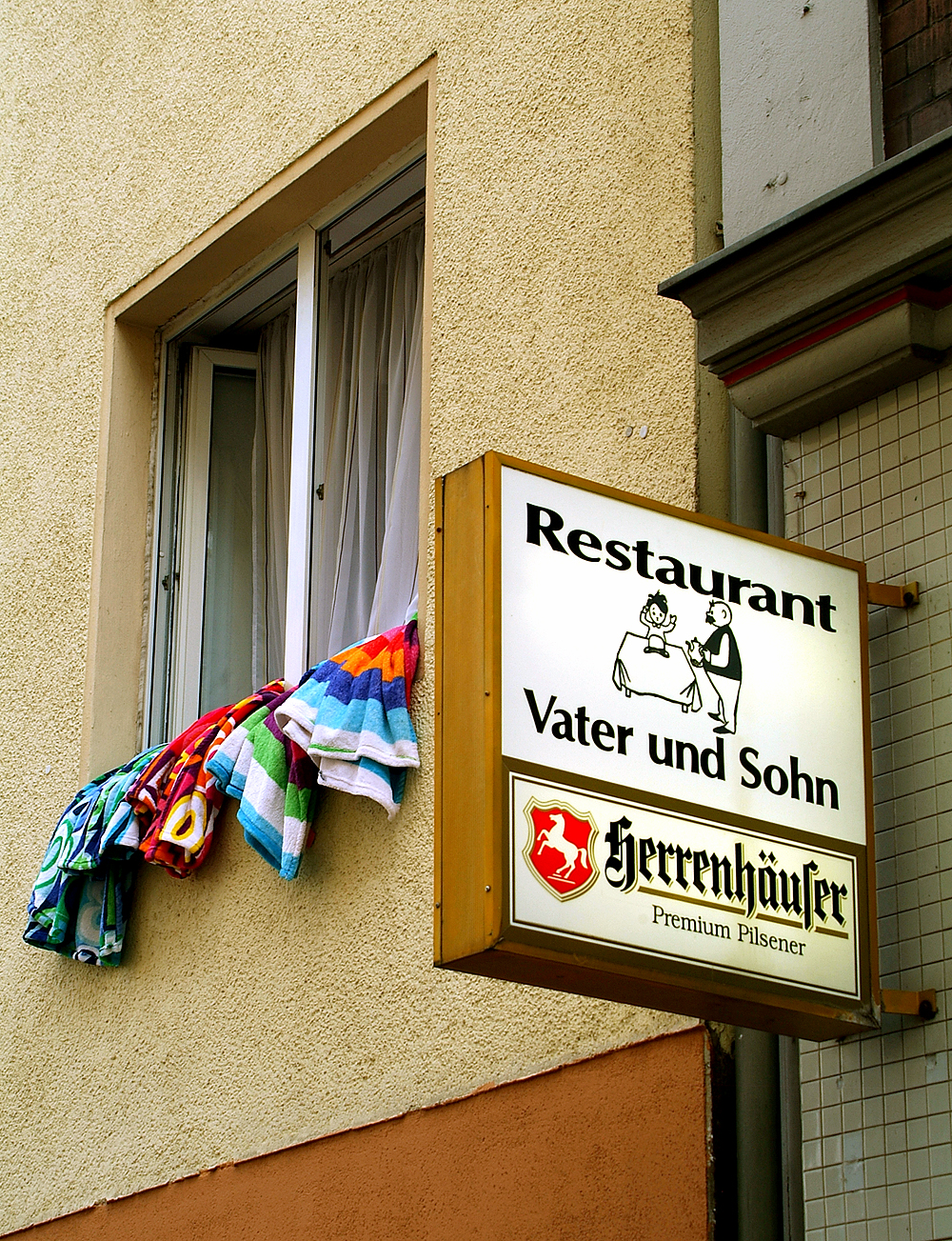
Sign of Restaurant Vater und Sohn in Warmbüchenstraße, Hannover, Germany

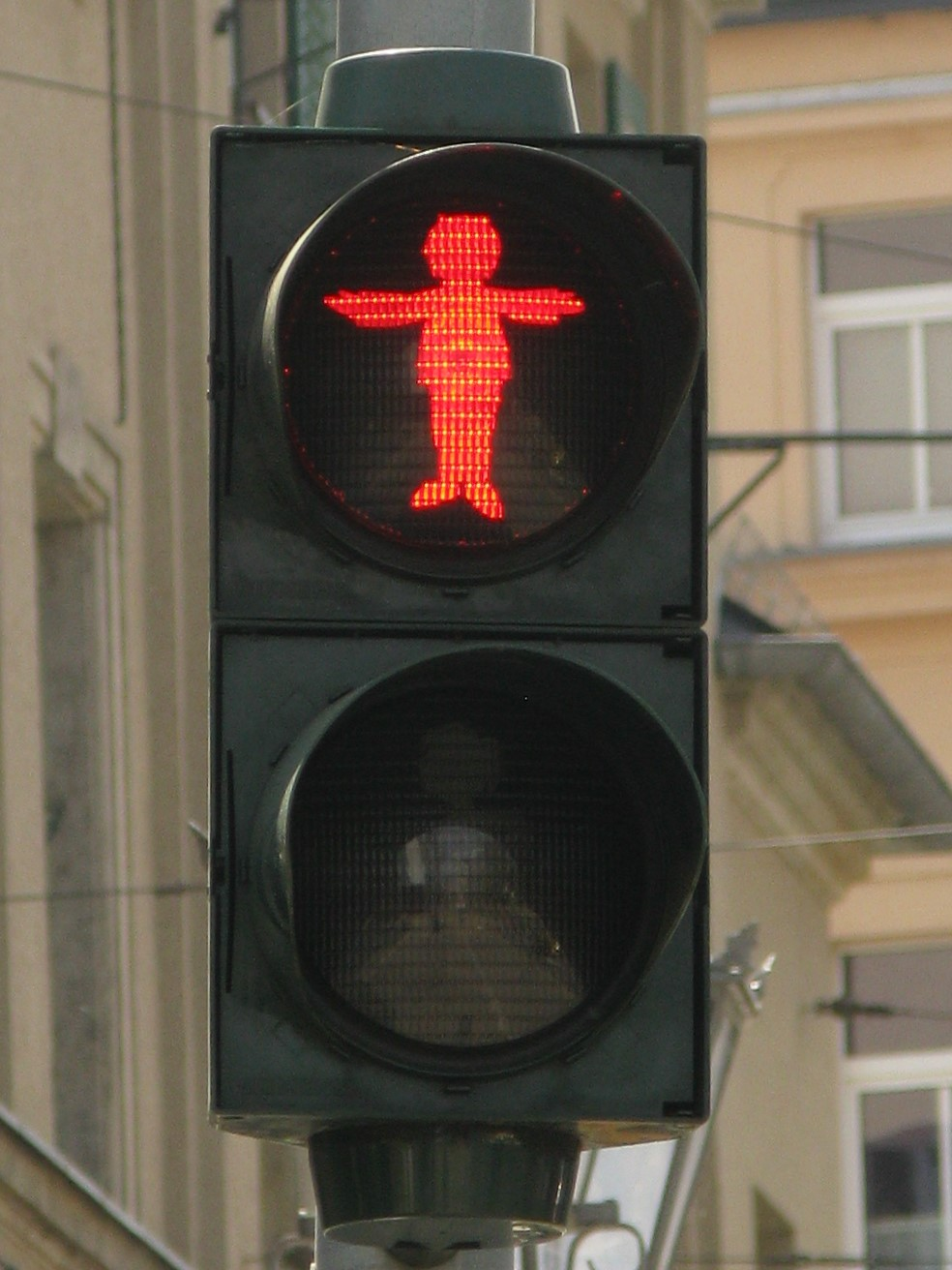
Father and Son traffic lights in front of the Plauen city hall – Red Phase (Father)

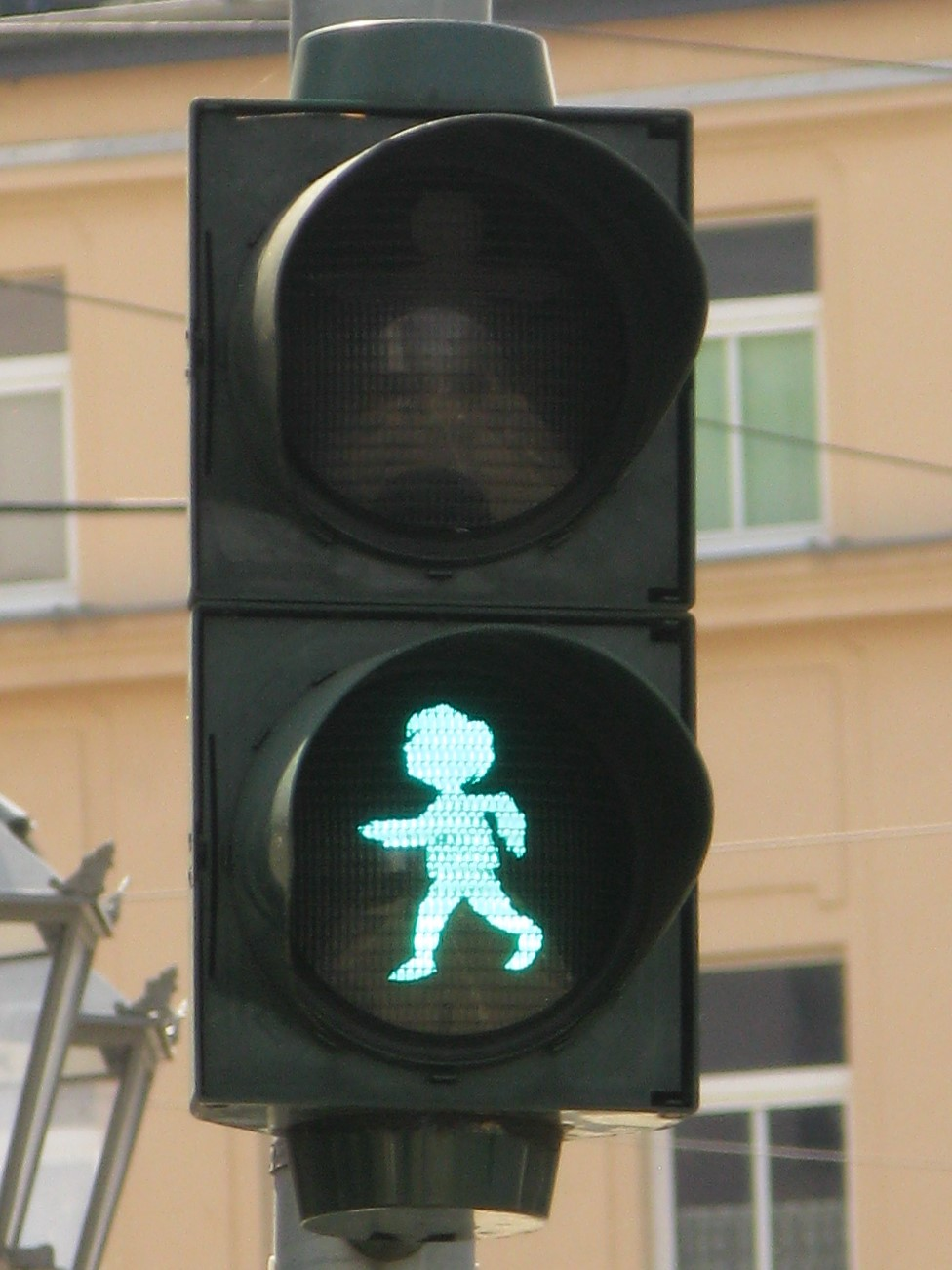
Father and Son traffic lights in front of the Plauen city hall – Green Phase (Son)

== Continuation ==
In November 2015, the sequel Neue Geschichten von Vater und Sohn ("New Stories of Father and Son"), with drawings by German illustrator Ulf K. and written by Marc Lizano, a Frenchman were published by Panini Group. A second volume followed in November 2016.

== Literature ==
=== First Editions ===
- Erich Ohser: Vater und Sohn: 50 lustige Streiche und Abenteuer, Ullstein Verlag, Berlin 1935
- Erich Ohser: Vater und Sohn: 50 neue lustige Streiche und Abenteuer, Ullstein Verlag, Berlin 1936
- Erich Ohser: Vater und Sohn: Noch 50 lustige Streiche und Abenteuer, Ullstein Verlag, Berlin 1938
- Ulf K., Marc Lizano: Neue Geschichten von Vater und Sohn, Panini Comics, Stuttgart 2015, ISBN 978-3-8332-3176-6
- Ulf K., Marc Lizano: Neue Geschichten von Vater und Sohn – Band 2, Panini Comics, Stuttgart 2016, ISBN 978-3-8332-3328-9

=== English Editions ===
- E. O. Plauen: Father and Son, New York Review Comics, 2017, ISBN 978-1-6813-7120-7

=== Secondary Literature ===
- Andreas C. Knigge: Fortsetzung folgt – Comic-Kultur in Deutschland. Ullstein, Frankfurt am Main / Berlin / Wien 1986, ISBN 3-548-36523-X, pp. 40–43.
- Andreas C. Knigge: Comic-Lexikon. Ullstein, Frankfurt am Main / Berlin 1988, ISBN 3-548-36554-X, pp. 347–348.
- Andreas C. Knigge: 50 Klassiker Comics. Von Lyonel Feininger bis Art Spiegelman. Gerstenberg, Hildesheim 2004, ISBN 3-8067-2556-X, pp. 78–81.
- Eckart Sackmann: Erich Ohsers Vater und Sohn – eine Ikone aus neutraler Sicht. In: Eckart Sackmann: Deutsche Comicforschung 2013, Hildesheim 2012.
