= Black Star (photo agency) =

Black Star, also known as Black Star Publishing Company, was started by refugees from Germany who had established photographic agencies there in the 1930s. Today it is a New York City-based photographic agency with offices in London and in White Plains, New York. It is known for photojournalism, corporate assignment photography and stock photography services worldwide. It is noted for its contribution to the history of photojournalism in the United States. It was the first privately owned picture agency in the United States, and introduced numerous new techniques in photography and illustrated journalism. The agency was closely identified with Henry Luce's magazines Life and Time.

== History ==
Black Star was formed in December 1935. The three founders were Kurt Safranski, Ernest Mayer and Kurt Kornfeld. In 1964, the company was sold to Howard Chapnick. The three founders; Safranski, Mayer and Kornfeld were German Jews who fled Berlin during the Nazi regime. They brought with them a wealth of knowledge and some new ideas for the American press.

Safranski was a graphic designer and editor for the Berliner Illustrirte Zeitung (BIZ), which was part of the Ullstein publishing house. During the early 1930s, Ullstein Verlag was Germany's largest publisher of books, newspapers and magazines. BIZ's circulation was over one million. While an editor at BIZ, Safranski was using two or more photos placed together to create a story which surpassed the need for text. Not only was this visually appealing, but it attracted more readers as well.

This drew the attention of the top American mass media publishers. William Randolph Hearst, a powerful media mogul of the day, who was intrigued by European advances in photography and printing. Hearst invited Safranski over to the United States to produce a dummy magazine using photos to tell the stories. Hearst liked the proposed idea but initially didn't move forward on it. Mayer then brought the idea to the experimental editorial department of Henry Luce, the largest publisher of the day, with periodicals such as Time and Fortune. Luce collaborated with Black Star to produce a new weekly magazine called Life. Life would use artistic photos in a new format. These pictures would be large and take up the majority of the page. They could capture not only a moment in time, but an emotion and story that would be paramount to the text. Prior to this, photojournalism in the U.S. was relegated to regional newspapers where text was more important than photos. Photos would sometimes be staged, posed or re-created to help a news article. But this all changed with the advent of the 35mm camera. The Leica, which was developed in Germany in 1925, was a small and easier to use camera. Advances in half-tone printing made using photographs in periodicals easier. Safranski and Mayer were already familiar with photographers who used this new technology to capture more candid moments.

Mayer owned the publishing company and photo agency, Mauritius, in Berlin. Forced by the Nazis to sell his business, he brought negatives, and connections to European photographers with him to the United States. The contacts included the notable photographers Dr. Paul Wolff and Fritz Goro. These contacts with European-based photographers, and the photographic negatives he brought with him, became the foundation for the new business.

Although Life was the agency's most high-profile client, Black Star also served other periodicals, newspapers, advertisers and publishers. Its stock of photography represents a pictorial history of the 20th century beginning in the 1930s. Some noted photographers associated with Black Star include Robert Capa, James Natchway, and Griffith J. Davis.

In 2003, Black Star's archive of 292,000 prints, created by more than 6,000 photographers was acquired by Jimmy Pattison, a Canadian media business mogul. In 2005, he donated it to Ryerson University (now named Toronto Metropolitan University) in Toronto. In 2012, the Ryerson Image Centre (now renamed The Image Centre) was opened to house the collection.
