= Rheinsberg (film) =

1967 film

- Directed by: Kurt Hoffmann
- Written by: Herbert Reinecker
- Based on: Rheinsberg by Kurt Tucholsky
- Produced by: Kurt Hoffmann; Heinz Angermeyer; Artur Brauner
- Starring: Cornelia Froboess; Christian Wolff; Werner Hinz
- Cinematography: Richard Angst
- Edited by: Gisela Haller
- Music by: Hans-Martin Majewski
- Production company: CCC Film
- Distributed by: Constantin Film
- Release date: 21 December 1967
- Running time: 88 minutes
- Country: West Germany
- Language: German

Rheinsberg is a 1967 West German romantic comedy film directed by Kurt Hoffmann and starring Cornelia Froboess, Christian Wolff and Werner Hinz. The film is based on the novel of the same name by Kurt Tucholsky set partly in Rheinsberg. Four years earlier Hoffmann had directed another Tucholsky adaptation, Gripsholm Castle.

The film's sets were designed by the art director Werner Schlichting. It was shot at the Spandau Studios in Berlin and on location in Bremen and Schleswig-Holstein. As the real Rheinsberg was then in Communist-controlled East Germany, alternative locations in the West stood in for it.

== Cast ==
- Cornelia Froboess as Claire
- Christian Wolff as Wolf
- Werner Hinz as Claire's Father
- Agnes Windeck as Frau Knappcke
- Ehmi Bessel as Claire's Mother
- Ruth Stephan as Anna
- Anita Kupsch as Paula
- Dinah Hinz as Lissy
- Monika Peitsch as Carla
- Willi Rose as Vogler
- Franz Nicklisch as Innkeeper
- Uwe Reichmeister as Ede
- Edith Elsholtz
- Karl Hellmer as Castellan Adler
- Werner Stock
- Bruno Fritz
- Ekkehard Fritsch as Man on Bus #1
- Jo Herbst
- Dieter Kursawe as Policeman
- Herbert Weissbach as Man on Bus #2

== Bibliography ==
- Bock, Hans-Michael; Bergfelder, Tim, eds. (2009). The Concise Cinegraph: Encyclopaedia of German Cinema. New York: Berghahn Books. ISBN 978-1-57181-655-9.
