= Nadja Tiller =

Austrian actress (1929–2023)

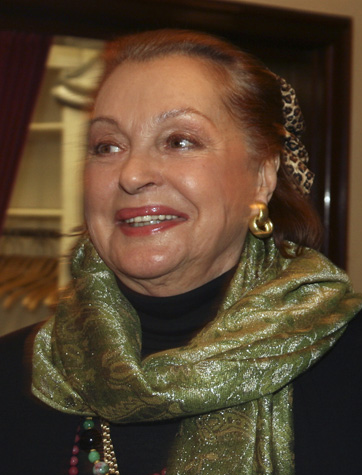
- Tiller in 2009
- Born: 16 March 1929; Vienna, Austria
- Died: 21 February 2023 (aged 93); Hamburg, Germany
- Occupation: Actress
- Years active: 1949–2009
- Spouse: Walter Giller (m. 1956; died 2011)
- Awards: Deutscher Filmpreis; Bambi; Austrian Cross of Honour for Science and Art

Nadja Tiller (16 March 1929 – 21 February 2023) was an Austrian actress in film, television, and on stage. She was one of the most popular German-speaking actresses in the international cinema of the 1950s and 1960s, receiving international recognition when she played the title role in the 1958 film Das Mädchen Rosemarie (Rosemary) in 1958, shown at the Venice Film Festival. It opened the way to international films. She often played alongside her husband, Walter Giller.

== Early life and background ==
Tiller was born in Vienna on 16 March 1929, the daughter of actor Anton Tiller of Vienna and his wife Erika née Körner (1902–1979), an opera singer and actress from Danzig. She attended there a Realgymnasium secondary school. In 1945 she began her studies at the Max-Reinhardt-Seminar, which she later continued until 1949 at the Musik- und Schauspielakademie, studying dance, ballet, and acting. She became an ensemble member at the Theater in der Josefstadt in 1949. That year she won the Miss Austria competition, a national beauty pageant for unmarried women in Austria.

== Acting career ==
Tiller made her film debut, also in 1949, in Arthur de Glahs 's Märchen vom Glück (Good Luck Fairytale), opposite Hildegard Knef. In 1952, she starred opposite Inge Egger and O. W. Fischer in Eduard von Borsody's Ich hab' mich so an Dich gewöhnt. She met her future husband Walter Giller in 1953; they became the German Traumpaar (dream couple) in many productions to come. Tiller had her artistic breakthrough in the 1955 film Die Barrings, directed by Rolf Thiele, alongside Lil Dagover, Ida Wüst, Paul Hartmann and Dieter Borsche.

In 1955, she acted opposite O. W. Fischer again in the film Ich suche Dich, based on a play by A. J. Cronin. Her international breakthrough role was Rosemarie Nitribitt in the 1958 German film Das Mädchen Rosemarie (Rosemary) in 1958, again directed by Thiele. The film was presented at the Venice Film Festival, and was awarded the Golden Globe the following year as the best foreign film. She then received offers for international productions, including from Antonioni for La notte, from Fellini for La dolce vita, and from Visconti for Rocco and His Brothers. She refused, naming family as a reason.

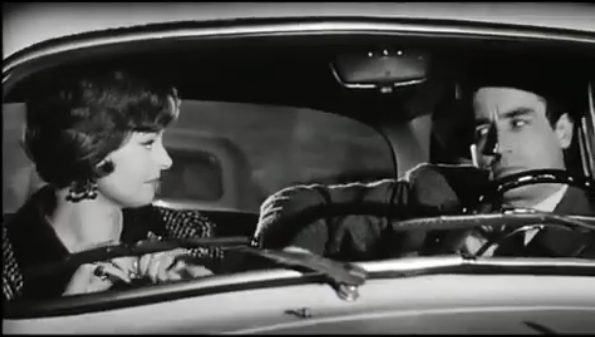
Nadja Tiller with Vittorio Gassman in Anima nera

She actually played in Tendre voyou (Tender Scoundrel) opposite Jean-Paul Belmondo, and in Du rififi à Paname (The Upper Hand) opposite Jean Gabin, among others. She appeared in Rossellini's Anima nera (1962) and in The Poppy Is Also a Flower (1966) with Rita Hayworth and Angie Dickinson.

With Thiele, she appeared in films based on literature, including as Gerda Buddenbrook in The Buddenbrooks in 1959, based on Thomas Mann's novel; she matched the author's description as an "elegant, strange, captivating and enigmatic beauty". She played Lulu opposite Mario Adorf in 1962, followed by Schloß Gripsholm, after Tucholsky's novel, in 1963, and Tonio Kröger based on Mann's novella in 1964.

Tiller appeared in around 120 films, including several international productions. She performed with partners such as Curd Jürgens, Hansjörg Felmy, Yul Brynner, Robert Mitchum, Rod Steiger, and Jean Marais, and at the height of her career was considered along with Sophia Loren to be among the most alluring women in European film.

In 1967 and 1968, she appeared on the open stage at Salzburg Festival in the annual play, Hofmannsthal's Jedermann (Everyman), as the Buhlschaft. In the 1970s and 1980s, she had theatre engagements, at the Theater Lübeck from 1974 to 1976), in Berlin in 1980 and 1984, and Vienna in 1981. In both Lübeck and Vienna, she played the lead female role in Kurt Weill musical Lady in the Dark. She appeared in boulevard plays until the late 1990s, such as the role of the aging film diva Joan Crawford in Cas Enklaar's Nächte mit Joan at the Hamburger Kammerspiele in 1997.

Subsequently, she played occasional leading roles and made guest appearances in various television productions. After a long absence from the cinema, she was cast in 2005 by Til Schweiger in his roadmovie Barfuss, and in 2009 by Leander Haußmann in his film comedy Dinosaurier – Gegen uns seht ihr alt aus!, alongside her husband, playing a couple of senior citizens.

From September to October 2010, Tiller made guest appearances in the role of the greatest diva of all time in Schorsch Kamerun's production of the play Vor uns die Sintflut at the Thalia Theater Tent in Hamburg's Hafencity. From January – April 2015, she appeared in the musical My Fair Lady as Mrs. Higgins at the Staatstheater Braunschweig, a role she repeated in the 2015/16 season.

In the 1980s, Tiller promoted the Mon Chéri line of pralines produced by Italian manufacturer Ferrero.

== Personal life ==
Nadja Tiller married actor Walter Giller in 1956; they had a son (born 1964) and a daughter (born 1959). In March 2008, they moved into the Augustinum retirement home in Hamburg. Giller died of cancer on 15 December 2011, at age 84.

Tiller died in Hamburg on 21 February 2023, at age 93.

== Films ==
Films with Tiller include:

- Märchen vom Glück (1949)
- Kleiner Schwindel am Wolfgangsee (1949)
- Kind der Donau (Child of the Danube, 1950)
- Schäm Dich, Brigitte! (Shame on You, Brigitte!, 1952)
- Ich hab' mich so an Dich gewöhnt (1952)
- Illusion in Moll (Illusion in a Minor Key, 1952)
- Die Kaiserin von China (The Empress of China, 1953)
- Einmal keine Sorgen haben (To Be Without Worries, 1953)
- Ein tolles Früchtchen (1953)
- Schlagerparade (Hit Parade, 1953)
- Liebe und Trompetenblasen (Love and Trumpets, 1954)
- Sie (She, 1954)
- Gestatten, mein Name ist Cox (Hello, My Name is Cox, 1955)
- Ball im Savoy (Ball at the Savoy, 1955)
- Griff nach den Sternen (Reaching for the Stars, 1955)
- Wie werde ich Filmstar? (How Do I Become a Film Star?, 1955)
- Hotel Adlon (1955)
- Die Barrings (The Barrings, 1955)
- Mozart (1955)
- Das Bad auf der Tenne (The Bath in the Barn, 1956)
- Ich suche Dich (1956)
- Friederike von Barring (1956)
- Fuhrmann Henschel (Drayman Henschel, 1956)
- Spion für Deutschland (Spy for Germany, 1956)
- Banktresor 713 (1957)
- Drei Mann auf einem Pferd (1957)
- El Hakim (1957)
- Le désordre et la nuit (1958)
- Das Mädchen Rosemarie (Rosemary, 1958)
- Labyrinth (1959)
- The Rough and the Smooth (1959)
- The Buddenbrooks (The Buddenbrooks, 1959)
- Die Botschafterin (The Ambassador, 1960)
- L'affaire Nina B. (The Nina B. Affair, 1961)
- Geliebte Hochstaplerin (Beloved Impostor, 1961)
- Lulu (1962)
- Anima nera (1962)
- Moral 63 (1963)
- Schloß Gripsholm (Gripsholm Castle, 1963)
- Das große Liebesspiel (And So to Bed, 1963)
- Tonio Kröger (1964)
- Du rififi à Paname (The Upper Hand, 1966)
- The Poppy Is Also a Flower (1966)
- Tendre voyou (Tender Scoundrel, 1966)
- How I Learned to Love Women (1966)
- L'estate (1966)
- Lady Hamilton (1968)
- Death Knocks Twice (1969)
- Hotel Royal (1969, TV film)
- Ohrfeigen (Slap in the Face, 1970)
- 11 Uhr 20 (1970, TV miniseries)
- Engel, die ihre Flügel verbrennen (Angels with Burnt Wings, 1970)
- Der Mönch und die Frauen (The Monk, 1972)
- Pakten (1995)
- Holstein Lovers (1999, TV film)
- Barfuss (Barefoot, 2005)
- Dinosaurier – Gegen uns seht ihr alt aus! (2009)

== Awards ==
Tiller and her husband, Walter Giller, jointly received a Bambi for their life's work on 30 November 2006. Her awards also included:

- 1956: Golden Mask
- 1959: Italian Film Award for The Girl Rosemarie
- 1960: Deutscher Filmpreis in Silver for Best Actress for Labyrinth
- 1963: Prêmio Saci, Argentinian Film Award for Moral 63
- 1979: Deutscher Filmpreis in Gold for many years of excellent work in the German film industry
- 1999: Platinum Romy for lifetime achievement
- 1999: Ehrenmedaille der Bundeshauptstadt Wien, medal of the Austrian capital Vienna
- 1999: Austrian Cross of Honour for Science and Art, 1st class
- 2000: Order of Merit of the Federal Republic of Germany
- 2005: DIVA in the category Lifetime Award (Hall of Fame)
- 2009: Askania Award for cinematic work (with Giller)
