= Schloss Gripsholm =

Story by Kurt Tucholsky

Schloss Gripsholm: Eine Sommergeschichte
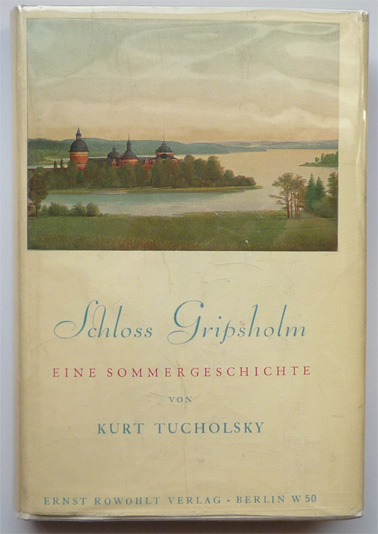
- Cover of the original edition, Rowohlt, Berlin 1931
- Author: Kurt Tucholsky
- Language: German
- Genre: Story
- Published: 1931

Schloss Gripsholm: Eine Sommergeschichte (Gripsholm palace: A summer story) is the title of a story (Erzählung) by Kurt Tucholsky, published in 1931. It is a love story with comic and melancholic elements, reminiscent of the author's first novel, Rheinsberg: Ein Bilderbuch für Verliebte. Chatto & Windus, London, published it in 1985 as Castle Gripsholm: A Summer Story, in a translation by Michael Hofmann.

== Plot ==
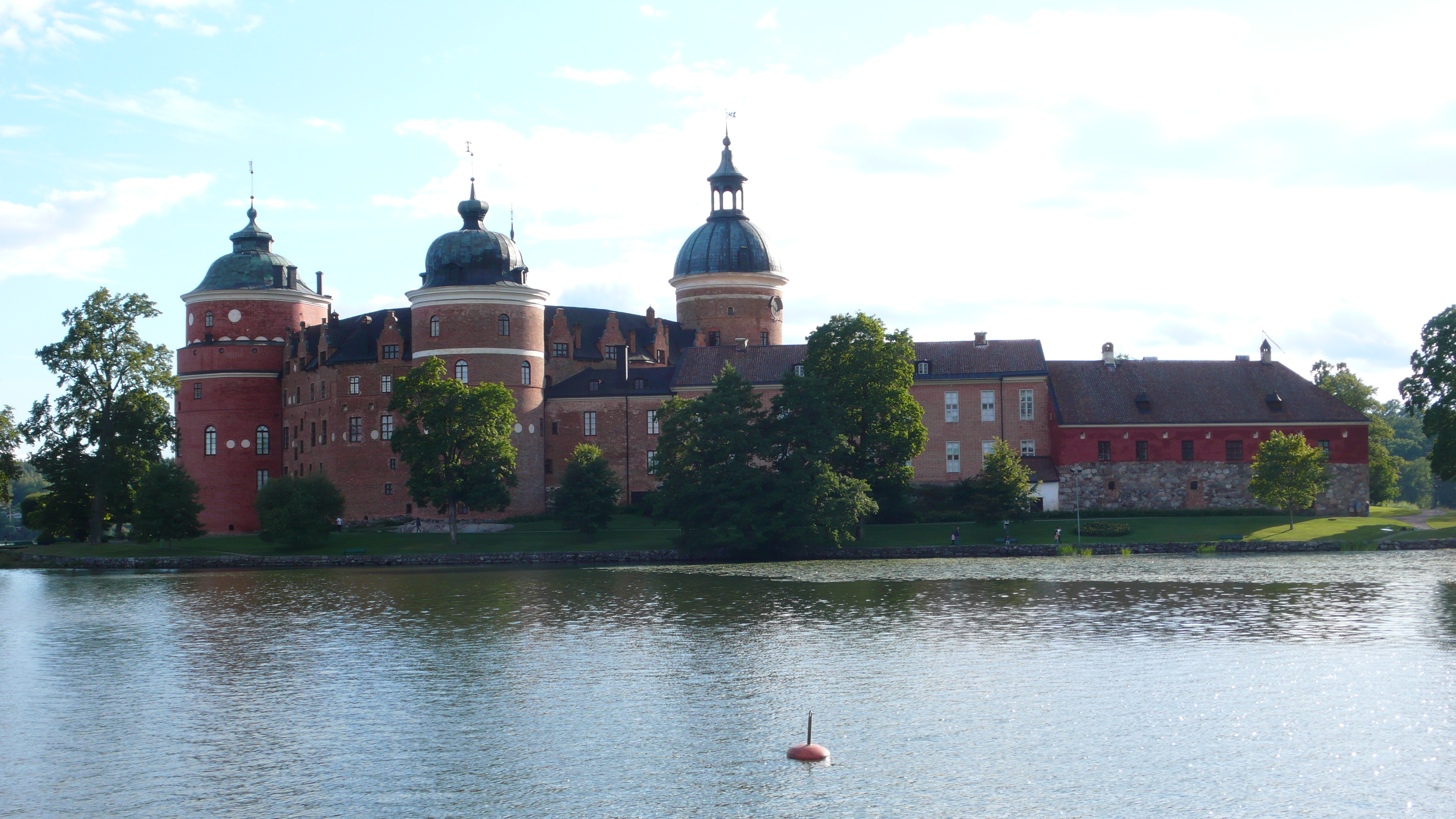
Gripsholm palace

The book begins with a fictional correspondence of an author and his publisher, Ernst Rowohlt. with Rowohlt encouraging Tucholsky to write another light and cheerful love story, and Tucholsky replying that he could offer a summer story.

The following story covers a summer vacation of Kurt, called Peter and narrating in the first person, with his friend Lydia, called by him almost always "die Prinzessin" (the princess), in Sweden. After train and ferry rides, they arrive at Gripsholm palace where they spend around three weeks. They are visited there by Kurt's old friend Karlchen, and later Lydia's best friend Billie. The story in episodes includes an erotic scene of three, unusual at the end of Weimar Germany, but also the observation of a little girl suffering under a sadistic German woman running a children's home. They contact the child's mother who lives in Switzerland and organise the girl's trip back to there.

== Background ==
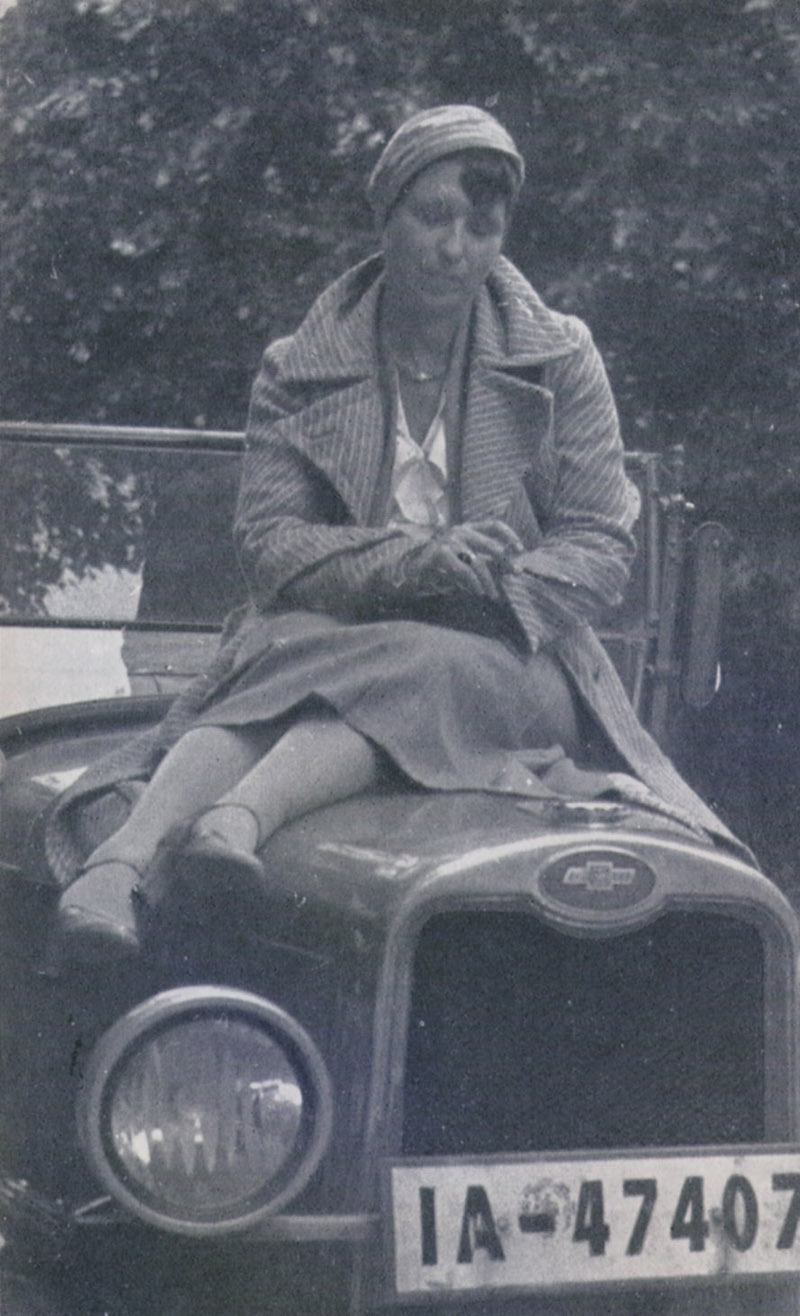
Lisa Matthias sitting on her car

The dedication of the story is "Für IA 47 407" which is the license plate of the car of Lisa Matthias in Berlin, who was Tucholsky's partner from 1927 to 1931. At first he emigrated to Paris, but in 1929 he decided to move to Sweden. He lived in Läggesta, close to Gripsholm from April to October that year, but searched for a different permanent home. Tucholsky wrote in a letter to Alfred Stern that the book has only a few autobiographical features. Tucholsky was deprived of his German citizenship when the Nazis came to power. He died in 1935 and was buried close to Schloss Gripsholm.

== Editions ==
The story first appeared as a serial novel in Berliner Tageblatt, beginning on 20 March 1931. It was published as a book by Rowohlt Verlag in Berlin the same year. In 1950, the story was one of the first paperbacks by Rowohlt.

== Film ==
The story was filmed in 1963 for the first time, titled Schloß Gripsholm, directed by Kurt Hoffmann and starring Walter Giller, Jana Brejchová, Hanns Lothar and Nadja Tiller.

Another film, Gripsholm, was released in 2000, directed by Xavier Koller, starring Ulrich Noethen, Heike Makatsch and Jasmin Tabatabai.
