= Gripsholm Castle (film) =

1963 film

- Directed by: Kurt Hoffmann
- Written by: Herbert Reinecker; Kurt Tucholsky (Schloss Gripsholm)
- Produced by: Heinz Angermeyer; Kurt Hoffmann; Georg Richter
- Starring: Jana Brejchová; Walter Giller; Hanns Lothar
- Cinematography: Richard Angst
- Edited by: Ursula Kahlbaum
- Music by: Hans-Martin Majewski
- Production company: Independent Film
- Distributed by: Gloria Film
- Release date: 4 October 1963
- Running time: 99 minutes
- Country: West Germany
- Language: German

Gripsholm Castle (German: Schloß Gripsholm) is a 1963 West German romantic comedy film directed by Kurt Hoffmann and starring Jana Brejchová, Walter Giller and Hanns Lothar. It is based on Kurt Tucholsky's novel Schloss Gripsholm.

The film's sets were designed by the art director Otto Pischinger. Location shooting took place around Hamburg and at the real Gripsholm Castle in Sweden. It was filmed in Eastmancolor.

== Cast ==
- Jana Brejchová as Prinzessin Lydia
- Walter Giller as Kurt
- Hanns Lothar as Karlchen
- Nadja Tiller as Billie
- Agnes Windeck as Frau Kremser
- Carl-Gustaf Lindstedt as Herr Bengtson
- Ekkehard Fritsch as Tourist
- Inge Wolffberg as Touristin
- Willy Witte
- Ewald Wenck
- Ilse Trautschold

== See also ==
- Gripsholm (2000)

== Bibliography ==
- Hans-Michael Bock and Tim Bergfelder. The Concise Cinegraph: An Encyclopedia of German Cinema. Berghahn Books, 2009.
