= Gripsholm (film) =

2000 film by Xavier Koller

- Directed by: Xavier Koller
- Screenplay by: Stefan Kolditz
- Based on: Schloss Gripsholm by Kurt Tucholsky
- Produced by: Thomas Wilkening
- Starring: Ulrich Noethen; Heike Makatsch; Jasmin Tabatabai; Marcus Thomas
- Cinematography: Pio Corradi
- Edited by: Patricia Rommel
- Music by: David Klein; Olivier Truan
- Release date: November 16, 2000
- Running time: 100 minutes
- Countries: Switzerland; Germany; Austria
- Language: German
- Budget: 10,400,000 DM (estimated)
- Box office: $39,616

Gripsholm is a 2000 Swiss film directed by Xavier Koller based on Kurt Tucholsky's novel Schloss Gripsholm.

According to Koller, "The subject of the story is partly the autobiographical story of the aggressive publisher Kurt (Tucholsky), who in the year 1932 travels to Sweden together with his girlfriend Lydia, whom he calls "Princess". Variety singer Billie and pilot Karlchen follow later on to join up with the couple. After that begin a sensuous life and games of love in the last summer before the national socialists take over power in Germany. Kurt loves his friends who have abandoned him, as well as his girlfriend who loves him but nevertheless returns home. One tries to forget the troubles and hopes, in the face of a threatening catastrophe, to retain a certain innocence."

It was Switzerland's submission to the 73rd Academy Awards for the Academy Award for Best Foreign Language Film, but was not accepted as a nominee.

== Main cast ==
- Ulrich Noethen as Kurt
- Heike Makatsch as Prinzessin
- Jasmin Tabatabai as Billie
- Rudolf Wessely as Newspaper Editor
- Marcus Thomas as Karlchen

== See also ==
- Gripsholm Castle (1963 film)
- Kurt Tucholsky
- Cinema of Switzerland
- List of submissions to the 73rd Academy Awards for Best Foreign Language Film
- List of Swiss submissions for the Academy Award for Best Foreign Language Film

== Printed media reviews ==
- Cornelia Fleer. "Gripsholm" -- "film dienst" (Germany), Vol. 53, Iss. 23, 7 November 2000, Pg. 26 OCLC 758452838
- Detlef Kühn. "Xavier Kollers kluge und einfühlsame Tucholsky-Biographie" -- "epd Film" (Germany), Vol. 17, Iss. 11, 1 November 2000, Pg. 34
- Dominik Slappnig; et al. "Tucholskys Muse: Heike Makatsch in Xavier Kollers "Gripsholm" " -- Bern : Stämpfli, 2000. OCLC 635633458
