= Anima nera =

1962 film

- Directed by: Roberto Rossellini
- Cinematography: Luciano Trasatti
- Music by: Piero Piccioni
- Release date: 1962
- Country: Italy

Anima nera ("Black Soul") is a 1962 Italian drama film directed by Roberto Rossellini. It is based on the stage play with the same name written by Giuseppe Patroni Griffi.

== Plot ==
After living a questionable and reckless life for many years, Adriano decides to marry Marcella, a girl from a well-off family. However, Marcella's family disapproves and cuts ties. Adriano's troubled past resurfaces when Olga, a woman who used to support him, comes back asking for repayment of an old debt.

To meet these obligations, Adriano needs to accept an inheritance from a nobleman in Turin. This reveals a complicated relationship he had with the nobleman. When the truth is revealed to Marcella by the deceased's sister, she is disgusted and decides to leave Adriano. At this point, he starts a relationship with Mimosa, a woman with a questionable reputation.

Regretting her decision, Marcella returns home to find Mimosa there. Mimosa reproaches her for not understanding Adriano, and Marcella seems to accept the criticism. She attempts to rebuild their relationship but sets the condition that Adriano must reject the inheritance. Despite her efforts to convince him, Adriano, bored, goes along with it, only pretending to listen.

== Cast ==
- Vittorio Gassman: Adriano Zucchelli
- Nadja Tiller: Mimosa
- Annette Stroyberg: Marcella
- Yvonne Sanson: Olga Manfredi
- Tony Brown: Guidino
- Rina Braido: Lucia
- Eleonora Rossi Drago: Alessandra
