= E. O. Plauen =

German painter

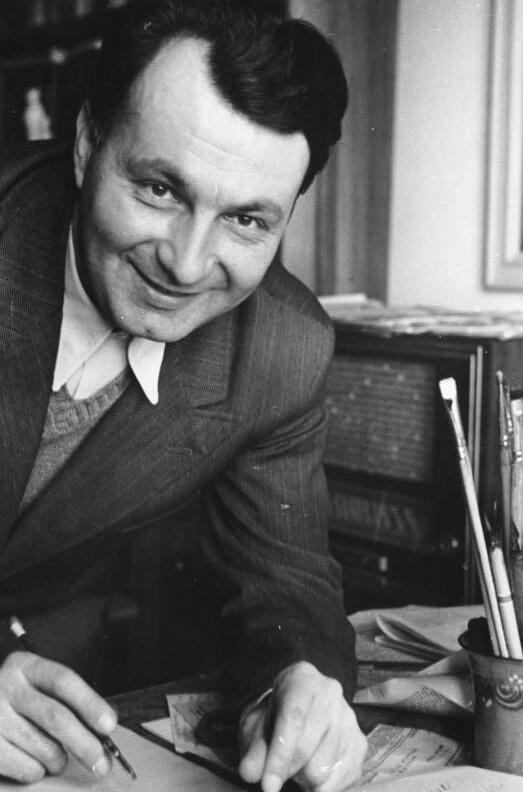
- Born: 18 March 1903
- Died: 5 April 1944 (aged 41); Berlin, Nazi Germany

E. O. Plauen (often stylized as e.o.plauen) was the pseudonym of Erich Ohser (18 March 1903 – 5 April 1944) (some sources give his birth year as 1909), a German cartoonist best known for his strip Vater und Sohn ("Father and Son").

== Life and work ==
Ohser was born in Untergettengrün, now an outlying centre of Adorf, in the Vogtland. When he was four years old, his family moved to Plauen (hence his choice of pseudonym). He completed his studies at the Akademie für Graphische Künste und Buchgewerbe in Leipzig in 1928.

Beginning work at the Sächsische Sozialdemokratische Presse, his work during the remainder of the Weimar Republic was satirical and political in support of democracy and the center-left Social Democratic Party of Germany, whereupon he soon transferred to the party's official and widely-read newspaper Vorwärts. Sharing the same political affiliation and a similar type of humor, he also maintained a co-operation with writer Erich Kästner, illustrating his satirical books Herz auf Taille and Ein Mann gibt Auskunft.

In the final years of the Weimar Republic, satirical representations of Joseph Goebbels and Adolf Hitler in Vorwärts earned him the enmity of the Nazis, and in 1933, he was swiftly prohibited from practicing his trade (Berufsverbot). Following that, he was dependent on his wife's income for some time, until he found work again in late-1934, when illustrated weekly magazine Berliner Illustrirte Zeitung announced that it was looking for "a German Mickey Mouse-type" of regular comic strip to publish. Ohser responded by sending in his first Vater und Sohn strips which the magazine's editorial board was immediately delighted about, but it was soon determined that he could only work under pseudonym because of his occupational ban, and he settled upon the pen name "E. O. Plauen", based on his initials and his childhood home of the town of Plauen. As demanded by this arrangement, his Vater und Sohn cartoons that he drew in the following years were entirely apolitical.

In 1940, Ohser was hired by Goebbels's propaganda weekly Das Reich, where he drew anti-Soviet and anti-American caricatures. In 1942, Goebbels founded a national animation studio, Deutsche Zeichenfilm GmbH, where Ohser worked on the 17-minute animation Armer Hansi about a canary who, in accordance with authoritarian Nazi ideology, learns about the 'folly' in rebelling against rules and authorities when leaving his cage, encountering a dangerous world outside and, barely surviving, returns to the safety of his cage in the end.

The same year, Ohser began to produce anti-Nazi cartoons in secret again and sharply criticized and mocked the Nazi regime in verbal remarks to friends, neighbors and colleagues. As a result of this Ohser's neighbor Bruno Schultz, Captain of the Wehrmacht Propaganda Troops formally reported him to Goebbels on 22 February 1944. After a secret investigation Ohser was arrested on charges of expressing anti-Nazi opinions (reichsfeindliche Äußerungen) on 28 March 1944 and a trial before the People's Court to be presided over by Roland Freisler was arranged. On 5 April 1944, the day before his trial, Ohser committed suicide by hanging while still in his cell.

Ohser's body was cremated and laid to rest in Reichenbach an der Fils. In accordance with his wishes he was later reinterred in the Ohser family plot at the Plauen Main Cemetary (Hauptfriedhof) in 1968.

== Vater und Sohn ==
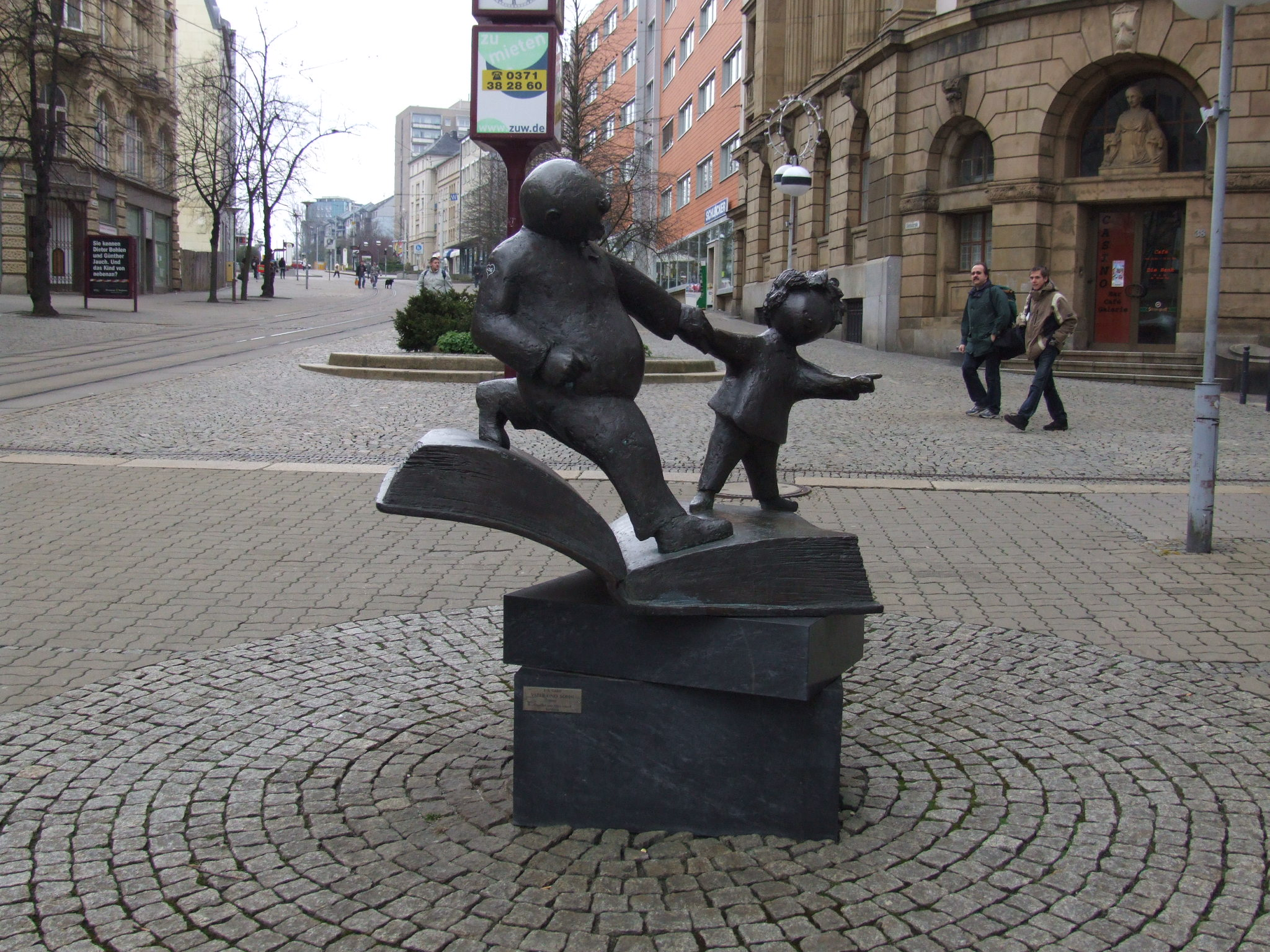
Statue of "Vater und Sohn" in Plauen

Vater und Sohn was a generally wordless feature consisting typically of five or six panels, in which a stout, bald man with a moustache and his young son Eric get into and out of various predicaments regarding day-to-day events. The strip featured slapstick humour most of all (spankings are frequent) but emphasizes the tender and conspiratorial relationship between the two. The strip appeared from 1934 to 1937 in the Berliner Illustrirte Zeitung, for a total of 157 episodes.

In the early 1990s, the feature was also transformed into a children's book series by Iranian publisher, 'Vazheh', which included explanations of the cartoons (in Persian) along with the strip on the opposite page.

== Memorials ==
The Städtische Galerie in Karlsruhe mounted an exhibition of his works in 2001. He is also remembered with the E.O. Plauen prize for an outstanding living caricaturist. Moreover, his "Vater und Sohn" characters have a statue in his hometown, where the figures also appear on storefronts and tram schedules

Vater und Sohn also inspired the Belgian comic strip Piet Fluwijn en Bolleke (1947–1974) by Marc Sleen, which is also a gag-a-day comic about a father and his son.
