= Lulu (1962 film) =

- Directed by: Rolf Thiele
- Screenplay by: Rolf Thiele
- Based on: The Lulu plays by Frank Wedekind
- Produced by: Otto Dürer
- Starring: Nadja Tiller; O. E. Hasse; Hildegard Knef
- Cinematography: Michel Kelber
- Edited by: Eleonore Kunze
- Music by: Karl de Groof
- Production company: Vienna Film
- Distributed by: Europa-Filmverleih AG; NWDF
- Release date: June 7, 1962 (West Germany)
- Running time: 100 min.
- Country: Austria
- Language: German

Lulu (also released in the UK as No Orchids for Lulu) is a 1962 Austrian crime drama film written and directed by Rolf Thiele. The film is an adaptation of Frank Wedekind's Lulu plays—Earth Spirit (Erdgeist, 1895) and Pandora's Box (Die Büchse der Pandora, 1904)—and stars Nadja Tiller (as Lulu), O. E. Hasse, and Hildegard Knef.

Sadoul's Dictionary of Films describes Thiele's work as "[a] heavy-handed, almost absurd version" of Wedekind's plays. But Robert von Dassanowsky credits Lulu as one of the "few notable [Austrian] dramas during the early 1960s".

== Plot ==
The story of a sexually enticing young dancer who rises up in society through her relationships with wealthy men, but later falls into poverty and prostitution, culminating in an encounter with Jack 'the Ripper'.

== Cast ==
- Nadja Tiller: Lulu
- O. E. Hasse: Dr. Schön
- Hildegard Knef: Gräfin Geschwitz
- Mario Adorf: Rodrigo
- Charles Regnier: Jack the Ripper
- Rudolf Forster: Schigolch
- Leon Askin: Medizinialrat Dr. Goll
- Sieghardt Rupp: Maler Schwarz
- Claus Höring: Alva Schön
