= Kurt Szafranski =

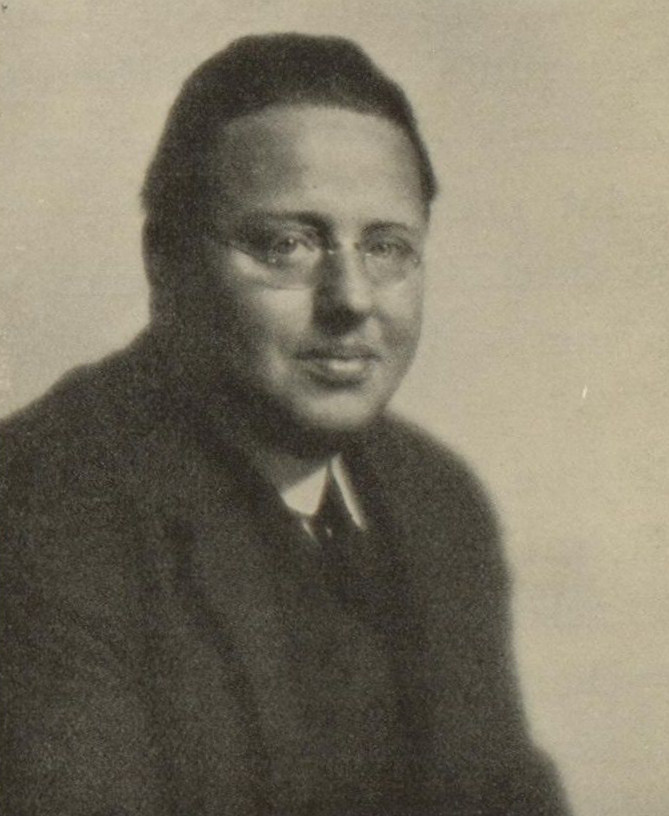
- Kurt Szafranski
- Born: 17 October 1890; Berlin, German Empire
- Died: 1 March 1964 (aged 73); Kingston, New York, U.S.
- Other names: Kurt Safranski
- Occupations: Draftsman; Journalist; Managing director
- Organizations: Berliner Illustrirte Zeitung; Ullstein Verlag; Black Star

Kurt Szafranski, in exile Safranski, (17 October 1890 – 1 March 1964) was a German-American draftsman, journalist and managing director. In Germany, he illustrated Kurt Tucholsky's Rheinsberg in 1912, and was managing director of the Berliner Illustrirte Zeitung (BIZ). In exile in the U.S., he was a co-founder of the Black Star, a leading photo agency.

== Life and career ==
Born in Berlin, Szafranski was a friend of the writer Kurt Tucholsky, whose first literary work, Rheinsberg, he illustrated in 1912. With his friend Tucholsky, he opened a Bücherbar (book bar) on Kurfürstendamm, where they sold cheap books and alcoholic beverages. Every purchaser of Rheinsberg received a free schnaps. He also illustrated for Klabund. By the Tucholsky illustrations, he had contact to the Ullstein Verlag, where he worked on the artistic advisory board from 1913. In the 1920s, he was managing director of the Berliner Illustrirte Zeitung (BIZ), where he established high artistic standards; the magazine, published by Ullstein Verlag, was in 1933 the largest weekly in Europe with a circulation of nearly two million. He made photojournalism a new genre.

In 1935, he and his family emigrated to the U.S. because of the Nazi persecution of Jews. He changed his name to Safranski. With Kurt Kornfeld and Ernest Mayer, who also came from Berlin, he founded the well-known photo agency Black Star. The agency became a destination for both U.S. photographers and immigrants from Europe, especially from Germany. Black Star sold images to leading magazines such as Life and Time. From 2005, the archive of the Black Star has been held by The Image Centre of the Toronto Metropolitan University (formerly known as Ryerson University) in Toronto.

Safranski died in Kingston, New York.

== Publications ==
- Selling Your Pictures. Chicago: Ziff-Davis, 1940.
