= Rheinsberg (story) =

German illustrated story

Rheinsberg: Ein Bilderbuch für Verliebte
- Author: Kurt Tucholsky
- Illustrator: Kurt Szafranski
- Language: German
- Genre: Story
- Published: 1912

Rheinsberg: A Storybook for Lovers
- Translator: Cindy Opitz
- Published: 2015
- ISBN: 978-1-93-590227-0

Rheinsberg: Ein Bilderbuch für Verliebte (Rheinsberg: A picture book for lovers) is a story (Erzählung) by Kurt Tucholsky, with illustrations by Kurt Szafranski. Written in 1912, it was the journalist's first literary work. The plot is a weekend trip of a young unmarried pair of lovers from Berlin to Schloss Rheinsberg. The work, written in a light ironic style, was immediately successful. It was adapted to a film, an audio play, and audio books. It was translated in 2015 as Rheinsberg: A Storybook for Lovers.

== History ==
Tucholsky, a young journalist at the beginning of his career, wrote the book with autobiographical background in 1912, as his first literary work. It is based on a trip that the author took with Else Weil, a student of medicine and later his wife, in 1911. The fresh style, unusual for the period, was described as "infused with a summer-like breeziness and playfully ironic undertones.

=== Plot ===
The short Erzählung (story, literally: narrative) describes a trip of three days over a weekend of two young people who recently met, Claire and Wolfgang. They escape the city of Berlin where they live and work, for the rural Rheinsberg. They have to pretend to be married to get a room and call themselves the Gambetta couple (Ehepaar Gambetta). They arrive by train, visit Schloss Rheinsberg, take a boat tour on the surrounding lakes, admire the unspoiled nature which is unusual for them, and stroll at night, seeing parts of a stage play through a window. The following day, they enjoy a late breakfast and explore the town and its shops and visit a cinema. The last day is devoted to another boat tour, this time with Lissy Aachner, a medical student. After a final stroll through the park, they return home to "the big city, ... grey days and longing telephone conversations, secretive afternoons, work and all the happiness of their great love" ("in die große Stadt, in der es wieder Mühen für sie gab, graue Tage und sehnsüchtige Telefongespräche, verschwiegene Nachmittage, Arbeit und das ganze Glück ihrer großen Liebe.")

=== Publication and marketing ===
Rheinsberg was published, with several illustrations by Kurt Szafranski, in 1912 in Berlin by Axel Junker Verlag. It soon became a classic for young lovers. With Szafranski, the author opened a Bücherbar (book bar) on Kurfürstendamm, where they sold cheap books and alcoholic beverages. Every purchaser of Rheinsberg received a free schnaps. The bar soon closed, but the book became a bestseller.

=== Editions ===
- Rheinsberg: Ein Bilderbuch für Verliebte. Illustrations by Kurt Szafranski. Axel Juncker Verlag, Berlin 1912.
  - Paperback: Rowohlt, Reinbek 1976, ISBN 978-3-499-10261-5.
  - Recent: Anaconda, Cologne 2010, ISBN 978-3-86647-498-7.

== Adaptations ==
=== Film ===
The book was adapted for film and released in 1967 as Rheinsberg, a West-German production directed by Kurt Hoffmann, with Cornelia Froboess and Christian Wolff in the principal roles. Hans-Martin Majewski composed the soundtrack.

=== Audio play ===
Rheinsberg was adapted as an audio play by Matthias Thalheim in 1985 for the broadcaster Rundfunk der DDR. The dramaturge was Heide Böwe, the music written by Thomas Natschinski, with director Barbara Plensat, and Kurt Böwe as the narrator, Ulrike Krumbiegel as Claire, Gunter Schoß as Wolfgang, Georg Helge as the Kastellan, and Dagmar Manzel as Lissy Aachner. It was first aired on 21 December 1985. The production was the entry for the Prix Italia 1987, translated by Katherine Vanovitch to English and by Elisabeth Radermacher to French. The production appeared in 2001 and 2012 as audio books on CD by Der Audio Verlag (ISBN 978-3-86-231157-6).

=== Audio books ===
- Anna Thalbach, Argon Verlag, Berlin 2009, ISBN 978-3-86610-746-5.
- Helene Grass, Diogenes Verlag, Zürich 2006, ISBN 3-257-80018-5.
- Anna Thalbach, Argon Verlag, Berlin 2006, ISBN 3-87024-083-0.

=== Translation ===
Cindy Opitz translated Rheinsberg in 2015 as Rheinsberg: A Storybook for Lovers, published by Small PressUnited.
