= Kurt Kusenberg =

Kurt Kusenberg (June 24, 1904 – October 3, 1983) was a German writer of short stories.

Kusenberg was born in Gothenburg, Sweden.

His father was an engineer, who worked in various countries, so Kusenberg grew up in Lisbon, Portugal, and also lived with his parents in North Africa for some time. He studied fine arts in Munich. While working for the publishers such as Rowohlt as an editor, he wrote nearly seventy short stories. They are unique in the way that dream, reality, humour, and the absolute fantastic are mixed.

Kusenberg died in Hamburg in 1983, aged 79.

In 2004, on the eve of the 100th anniversary of his birth, a new collection of stories was published.
