= Mainzelmännchen =

Fictional character

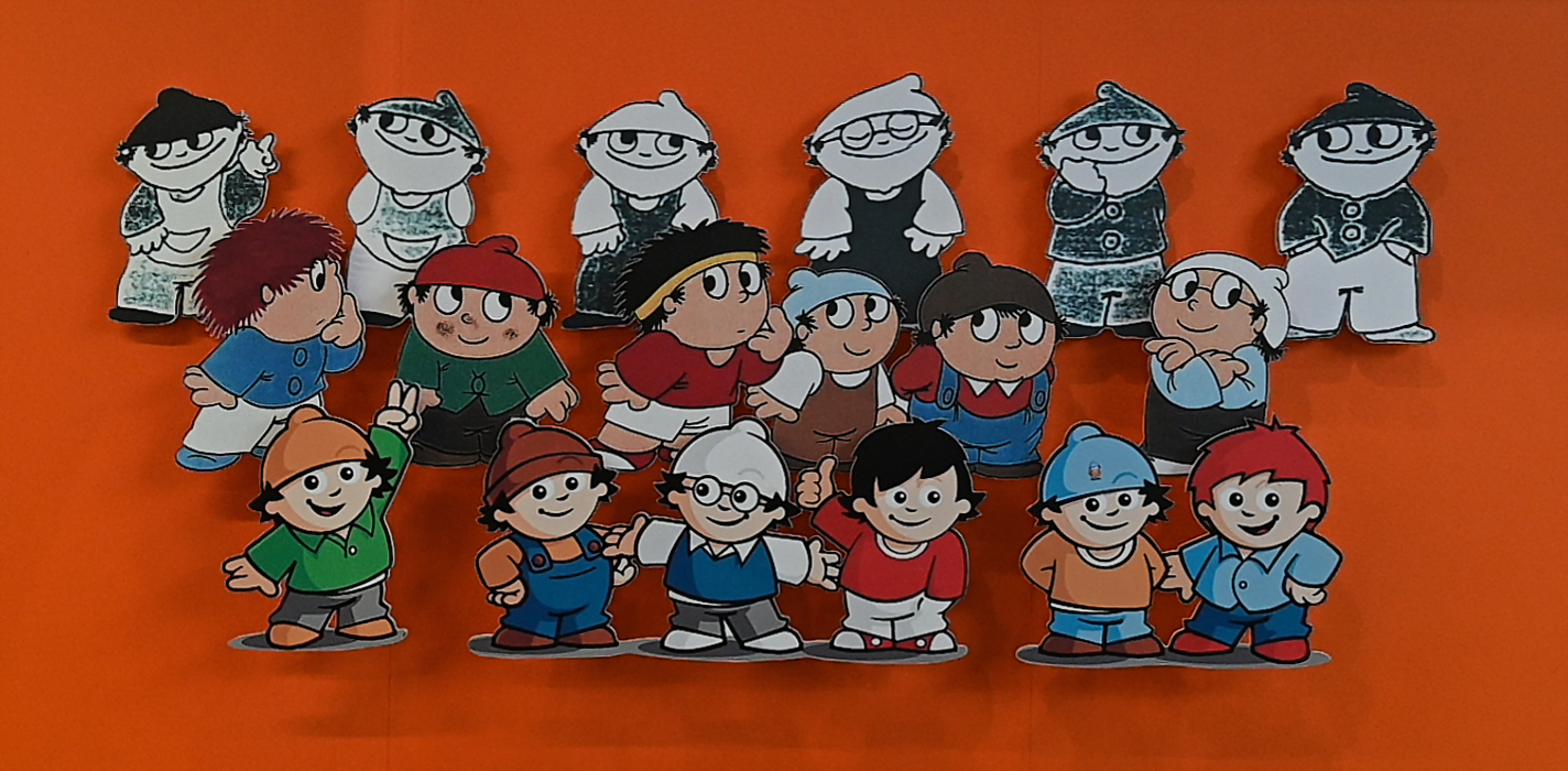
Different versions of the Mainzelmännchen over time

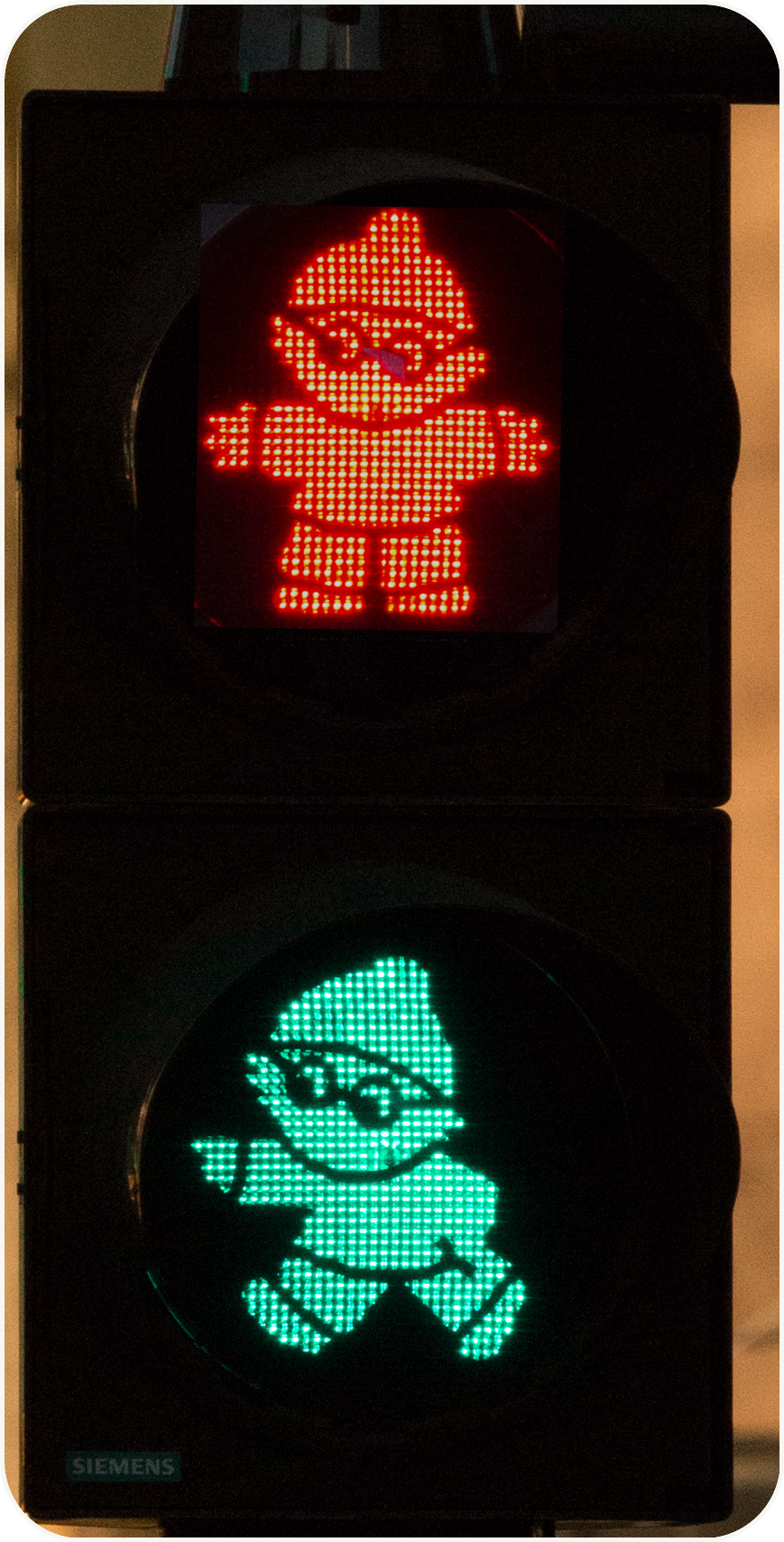
Pedestrian signal in Mainz

The Mainzelmännchen are six comedic cartoon characters used as mascots for the German public service television broadcaster ZDF. They first appeared on television in 1963 to accommodate a government regulation prohibiting confusion between broadcast advertising and content. The cartoon characters served as a transition between the two.

They appear in between ads during broadcasts, in roughly three to five-second clips, and often during the satirical news program Heute-show. The name is a portmanteau of the city of Mainz, home to the ZDF headquarters, and Heinzelmännchen, a type of gnome common in folklore in the region surrounding the city of Cologne. Wolf Gerlach created the characters.

The Mainzelmännchen have become popular across Germany. Apart from children's books and numerous other kinds of merchandise, radio dramas having been created surrounding them.

== Appearance and actions ==
The Mainzelmännchen are either wights or dwarves, and display similarities to Heinzelmännchen. They often wear a Phrygian cap similar to garden gnomes without a beard. Their appearances often last three to five seconds, during which they perform a single short gag. They usually speak in only a few short words, in a grumbly tone. Many of the gags are presented only visually and pantomimically. Their most famous saying is the traditional greeting "Gud'n Aamd", a dialect-accented "Guten Abend" ("good evening"). Their given names are Anton, Berti, Conni, Det, Edi, and Fritzchen.
