= Fritz Goro =

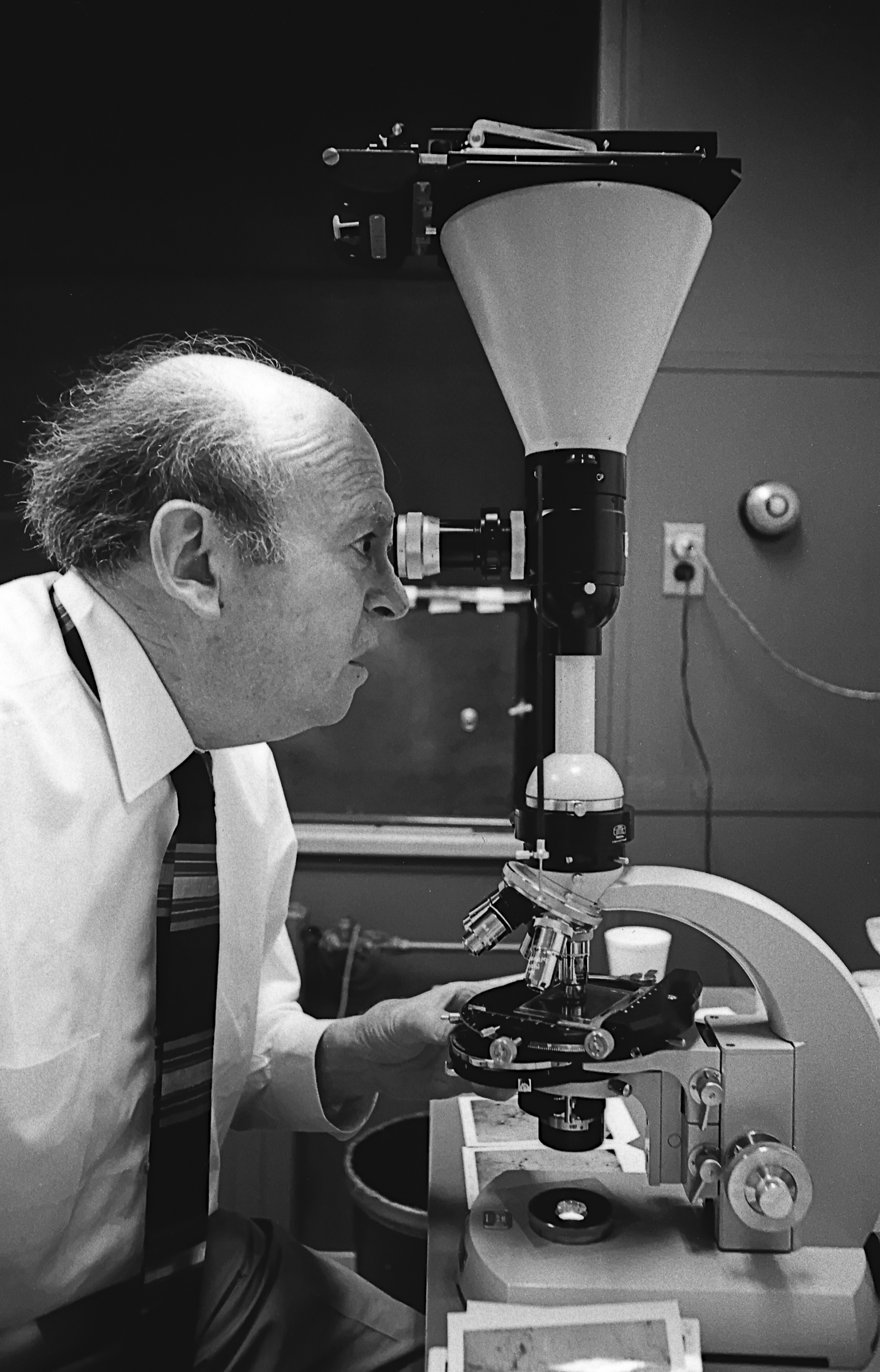
- Born: Fritz Gorodiski; 1901; Bremen, Germany
- Died: 14 December 1986 (aged 84–85); Chappaqua, New York
- Known for: Inventing macrophotography

Fritz Goro (originally Fritz Gorodiski; 1901 – 14 December 1986) was the inventor of macrophotography and a photographer specializing in science, published in the Life magazine and Scientific American. He started his career as a photojournalist in Germany before fleeing from the Nazis in 1933, arriving in the USA in 1936.

Goro was born 1901 in Bremen, (Germany). He documented many major scientific breakthroughs, including pictures of the first plutonium ever produced, the first atomic-bomb test, the advent of microelectronics, the ruby laser, as well as photos of Ali Javan timing the frequency of light at M.I.T. laboratory.

Goro was described by the evolutionary biologist Stephen Jay Gould as "the most influential photographer that science has ever known".

Goro died 14 December 1986 in Chappaqua, New York.
