= Kurt Tucholsky =

German journalist, satirist and writer

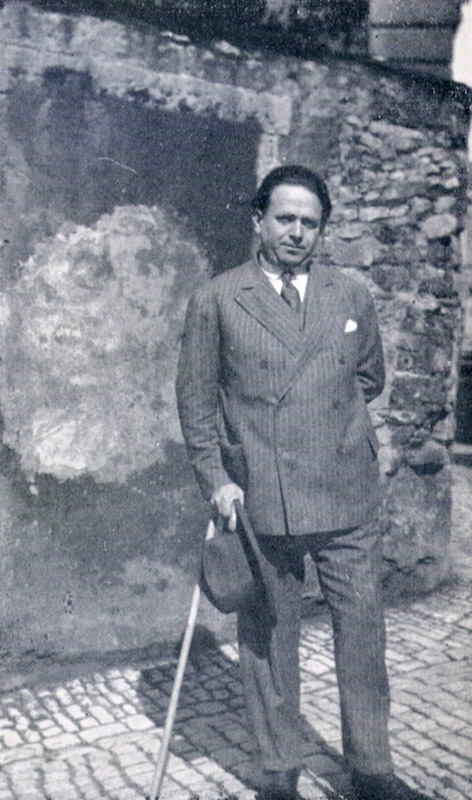
- Tucholsky in Paris, 1928
- Born: 9 January 1890; Berlin, German Empire
- Died: 21 December 1935 (aged 45); Gothenburg, Sweden
- Occupations: Journalist, author

Kurt Tucholsky (German: [kʊʁt tu.ˈxɔls.ki]; 9 January 1890 – 21 December 1935) was a German journalist, satirist, and writer. He also wrote under the pseudonyms Kaspar Hauser (after the historical figure), Peter Panter, Theobald Tiger and Ignaz Wrobel.

A politically engaged journalist and temporary co-editor of the weekly magazine Die Weltbühne, he was also a satirist, an author of satirical political revues, a songwriter, and a poet. He saw himself as a left-wing democrat and pacifist and warned against anti-democratic tendencies — above all in politics and the military — and the threat of Nazism. His fears were confirmed when the Nazis came to power in January 1933. In May of that year he was among the authors whose works were banned as "un-German" and burned; he was also among the first authors and intellectuals whose German citizenship was revoked.

According to Istvan Deak, Tucholsky was Weimar Germany's most controversial political and cultural commentator. He published over 2,000 essays, manifestos, poems, critiques, aphorisms, and stories.

In his writings he hit hard at his main enemies in Germany, whom he identified as haughty aristocrats, bellicose army officers, brutal policemen, reactionary judges, anti-republican officials, hypocritical clergymen, tyrannical professors, dueling fraternity students, ruthless capitalists, philistine burghers, opportunistic Jewish businessmen, fascistic petty-bourgeois, Nazis, even peasants, whom he considered generally dumb and conservative….He is admired as an unsurpassed master of satire, of the short character sketch, and of the Berlin jargon.

His literary works were translated into English, including the 1912 Rheinsberg: Ein Bilderbuch für Verliebte, translated as Rheinsberg: A Storybook for Lovers; and the 1931 Schloss Gripsholm: Eine Sommergeschichte, translated as Castle Gripsholm: A Summer Story.

== Youth, school and university ==
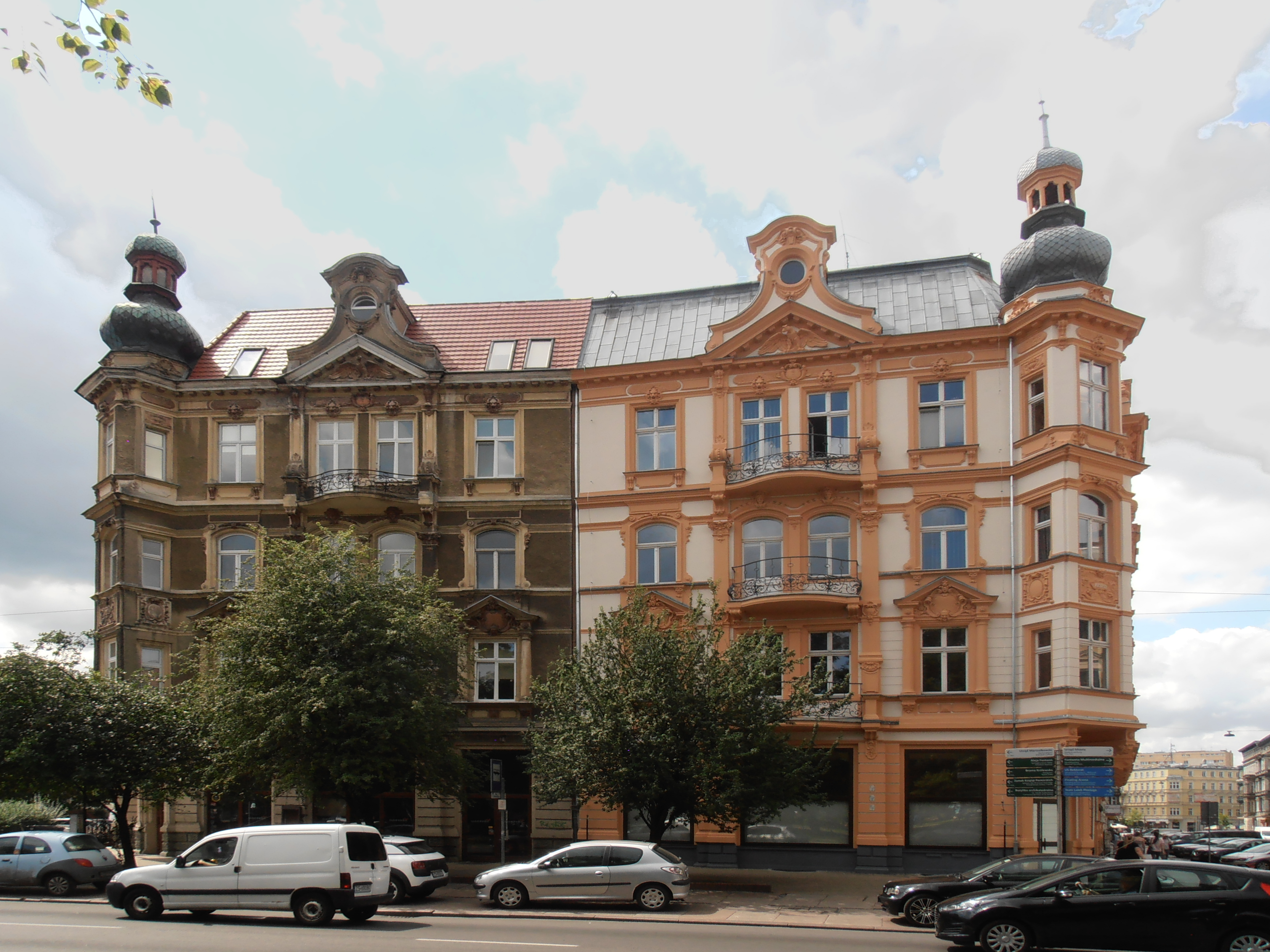
Tenement house in Szczecin, where Kurt Tucholsky lived in his early childhood

Kurt Tucholsky was born in a German Jewish family. His parents' house, where he was born on 9 January 1890, was at 13 Lübecker Straße in Berlin-Moabit. However, he spent his early childhood in Stettin (now in Poland), where his father had been transferred for work reasons. Alex Tucholsky had married his cousin Doris Tucholski in 1887 and had three children with her: Kurt, their eldest son, Fritz and Ellen. Tucholsky's relationship with his mother was strained throughout his life; he had a more harmonious relationship with his father, who, however, died in 1905, during Kurt's youth. Alex Tucholsky left a considerable fortune to his wife and children, which enabled his eldest son to go to university without any financial worries.

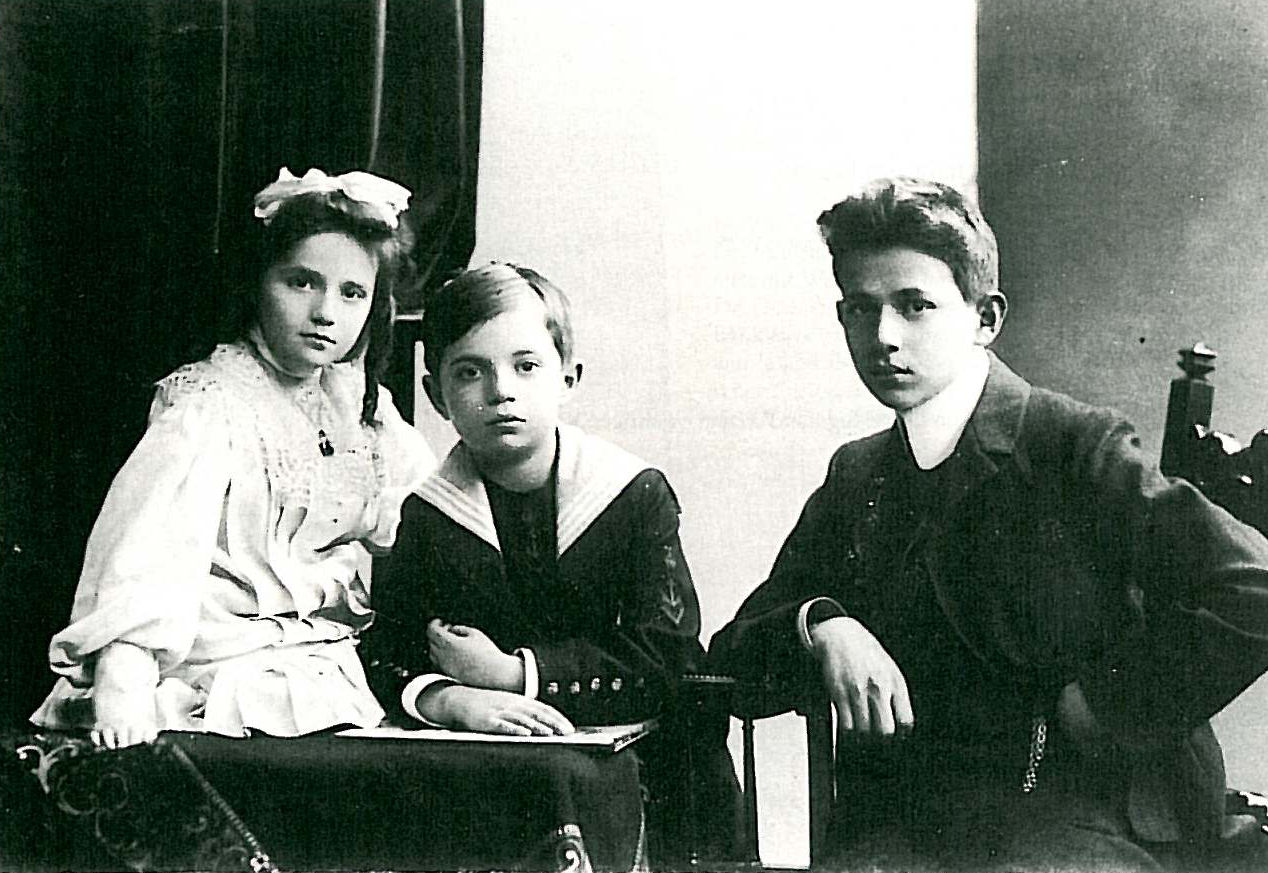
Kurt Tucholsky (right), 14 years old with his siblings Ellen and Fritz (1904)

In 1899, upon his family's return to Berlin, Kurt Tucholsky attended the French Grammar School (Französisches Gymnasium Berlin). In 1903 he transferred to the Royal Wilhelm Gymnasium; he failed out of gymnasium in 1907 and subsequently prepared for his Abitur with the help of a private tutor. After taking his Abitur examinations in 1909, he began studying law in Berlin in October of the same year, then spent his second semester in Geneva at the start of 1910.

When he was at university, Tucholsky's main interest was literature. Thus he travelled to Prague in September 1911 with his friend Kurt Szafranski to surprise his favorite author, Max Brod, with a visit and a model landscape that he had made himself. Brod introduced Tucholsky to his friend and fellow author Franz Kafka, who afterwards wrote in his diary about Tucholsky:

a wholly consistent person of 21. From the controlled and powerful swing of his walking stick which gives a youthful lift to his shoulders to the deliberate delight in and contempt for his own literary works. Wants to be a criminal defence lawyer.

Yet, despite his later doctorate, Tucholsky never followed a legal career: his inclination towards literature and journalism was stronger.

== First successes as a writer ==
While he was still at school, Tucholsky had already written his first articles as a journalist. In 1907 the weekly satirical magazine Ulk ("Prank") published the short text Märchen ("Fairy Tale"), in which the 17-year-old Tucholsky made fun of Kaiser Wilhelm II's cultural tastes. At university he worked more intensively as a journalist, among other things working for the social democratic party organs Vorwärts ("onwards") and Der Wahre Jacob. He involved himself in the SPD's election campaign in 1911.

With Rheinsberg – ein Bilderbuch für Verliebte ("Rheinsberg – a Picture Book for Lovers") in 1912, Tucholsky published a tale in which he adopted a fresh and playful tone (which was unusual for that time) and which made him known to a wider audience for the first time. To support the sales of the book, Tucholsky and Szafranski, who had illustrated the tale, opened a "Book Bar" on Kurfürstendamm in Berlin: anyone who bought a copy of his book also received a free glass of schnapps (this student prank came to an end after a few weeks).

In January 1913 Tucholsky began an enduring and productive new phase of his journalistic career when he published his first article in the weekly theatre magazine Die Schaubühne (later called Die Weltbühne). The owner of the magazine, the publicist Siegfried Jacobsohn, became Tucholsky's friend and mentor, offering him both encouragement and criticism, sometimes co-writing articles with him, and gradually inviting him to assume some editorial responsibility for Die Schaubühne; under Tucholsky's influence the focus of the journal shifted toward political concerns, and in 1918 it was renamed Die Weltbühne: Zeitschrift für Politik/Kunst/Wirtschaft ("The World Stage: Magazine for Politics/Art/Economics). Tucholsky reflected on the significance of his relationship with Jacobsohn in a "Vita" (biography) that he wrote in Sweden two years before his death: "Tucholsky owes to the publisher of the paper, Siegfried Jacobsohn, who died in the year 1926, everything he has become."

== Soldier in World War I ==
The beginning of Tucholsky's journalistic career was interrupted by the outbreak of World War I – for over two years, no articles by Tucholsky were published. He finished his studies at the University of Jena in Thuringia where he received his doctorate in law (dr. jur.) cum laude with a work on mortgage law at the beginning of 1915. By April of that year he had already been conscripted and sent to the Eastern Front. There he experienced positional warfare and served as a munitions soldier and then as company writer. From November 1916 onwards he published the field newspaper Der Flieger. In the administration of the Artillery and Pilot Academy in Alt-Autz in Courland he got to know Mary Gerold who was later to become his wife. Tucholsky saw the posts as writer and field-newspaper editor as good opportunities to avoid serving in the trenches. Looking back he wrote:

For three and a half years I dodged the war as much as I could – and I regret not having had the courage shown by the great Karl Liebknecht to say No and refuse to serve in the military. Of this I am ashamed. I used many means not to get shot and not to shoot – not once the worst means. But I would have used all means, all without exception, had I been forced to do so: I wouldn't have said no to bribery or any other punishable acts. Many did just the same.

These means, in part, did not lack a certain comic effect as emerges in a letter to Mary Gerold:

One day for the march I received this heavy old gun. A gun? And during a war? Never, I thought to myself. And leaned it against a hut. And walked away. But that stood out even in our group at that time. I don't know now how I got away with it, but somehow it worked. And so I got by unarmed.

His encounter with the jurist Erich Danehl eventually led to his being transferred to Romania in 1918 as a deputy sergeant and field police inspector. (Tucholsky's friend Danehl later appeared as "Karlchen" in a number of texts, for example in Wirtshaus im Spessart.) In Turnu Severin in Romania, Tucholsky had himself baptized as a Protestant in the summer of 1918. He had already left the Jewish community on 1 July 1914.

Although Tucholsky still took part in a contest for the 9th war bond (Kriegsanleihe) in August 1918, he returned from the war in the autumn of 1918 as a convinced anti-militarist and pacifist. In a 1931 text, he wrote Soldaten sind Mörder ("soldiers are murderers"), which subsequently led to numerous judicial proceedings in Germany.

In December 1918, Tucholsky took on the role of editor-in-chief of Ulk, which he held until April 1920. Ulk was the weekly satirical supplement of publisher Rudolf Mosse's left-liberal Berliner Tageblatt.

== Influence in the Weimar Republic ==
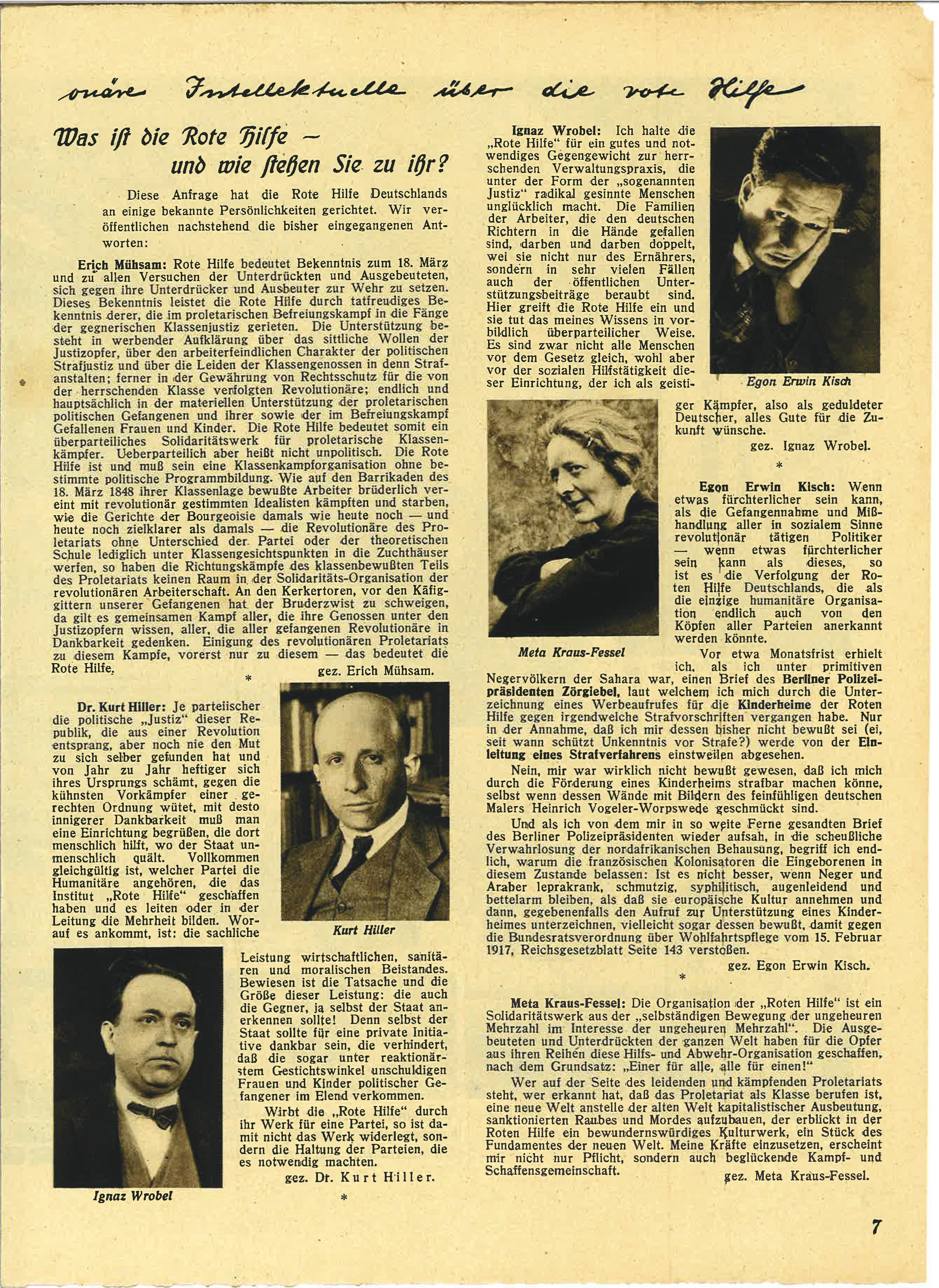
Tucholsky (far left, as "Ignaz Wrobel") in Der Roter Helfer, April 1927

While Tucholsky was the editor of Ulk, he remained a contributing writer to Die Schaubühne (The Theater Stage), which had been renamed Die Weltbühne (The World Stage) in 1913. The author, who wrote under his own name as well as under four pseudonyms (Theobald Tiger, Peter Panter, Kaspar Hauser, and Ignaz Wrobel) became one of the most famous and influential voices of the Weimar Republic, an outspoken satirist, and an opponent of German militarism, the right-wing judiciary system and an early warner about the rising National Socialist movement. He spent the years from 1925 to 1928 in Paris but returned to Berlin to briefly become editor of Die Weltbühne. His books were among the first to be burned by the Nazi party in 1933. At that point, he had already fled to Sweden.

== Death ==
On the evening of 20 December 1935 Tucholsky took an overdose of sleeping tablets in his house in Hindås. The next day he was found in a coma and taken to hospital in Gothenburg. He died there on the evening of 21 December. Recently, Tucholsky's biographer Michael Hepp has called into doubt the verdict of suicide, saying that he considers it possible that the death was accidental. However, this claim is disputed among Tucholsky researchers. Kurt Tucholsky was buried in the cemetery of Mariefred (near Gripsholm Castle) at Lake Mälaren. An inscription on his grave reads: Alles Vergängliche ist nur ein Gleichnis ("All that is transient is but a parable"), a quote from the epilogue of Goethe's Faust II.

== English editions and books ==
- Tucholsky, Kurt: Berlin! Berlin! Dispatches from the Weimar Republic, translated by Cindy Opitz. New York: Berlinica Publishing LLC, 2013. ISBN 978-1-935902-23-2
- Tucholsky, Kurt: Rheinsberg. A Storybook for Lovers, translated by Cindy Opitz. New York: Berlinica Publishing LLC, 2014. ISBN 978-1-935902-25-6
- Tucholsky, Kurt: Castle Gripsholm: A Summer Story translated by Michael Hofmann, Woodstock, New York: The Overlook Press, 1988. ISBN 0-87951-293-8
- Tucholsky, Kurt: Deutschland, Deutschland Über Alles: A Picture-book by Kurt Tucholsky, Photos assembled by John Heartfield. Translated from the German by Anne Halley. Afterword and notes by Harry Zohn. University of Massachusetts Press, 1972. ISBN 978-0870230387
- Tucholsky, Kurt: Prayer After the Slaughter: Poems and Stories from World War I, translated by Peter Appelbaum and James Scott. New York: Berlinica Publishing LLC, 2015. ISBN 978-1-935902-28-7
- Tucholsky, Kurt: Germany? Germany!: Satirical Writings: the Kurt Tucholsky Reader, translated by Harry Zohn. New York: Berlinica Publishing LLC, 2017. ISBN 978-1-935902-38-6
- Tucholsky, Kurt: Hereafter: We Were Sitting on a Cloud, Dangling Our Legs, translated by Cindy Opitz. New York: Berlinica Publishing LLC, 2018. ISBN 978-1-935902-89-8

== Legacy and honours ==
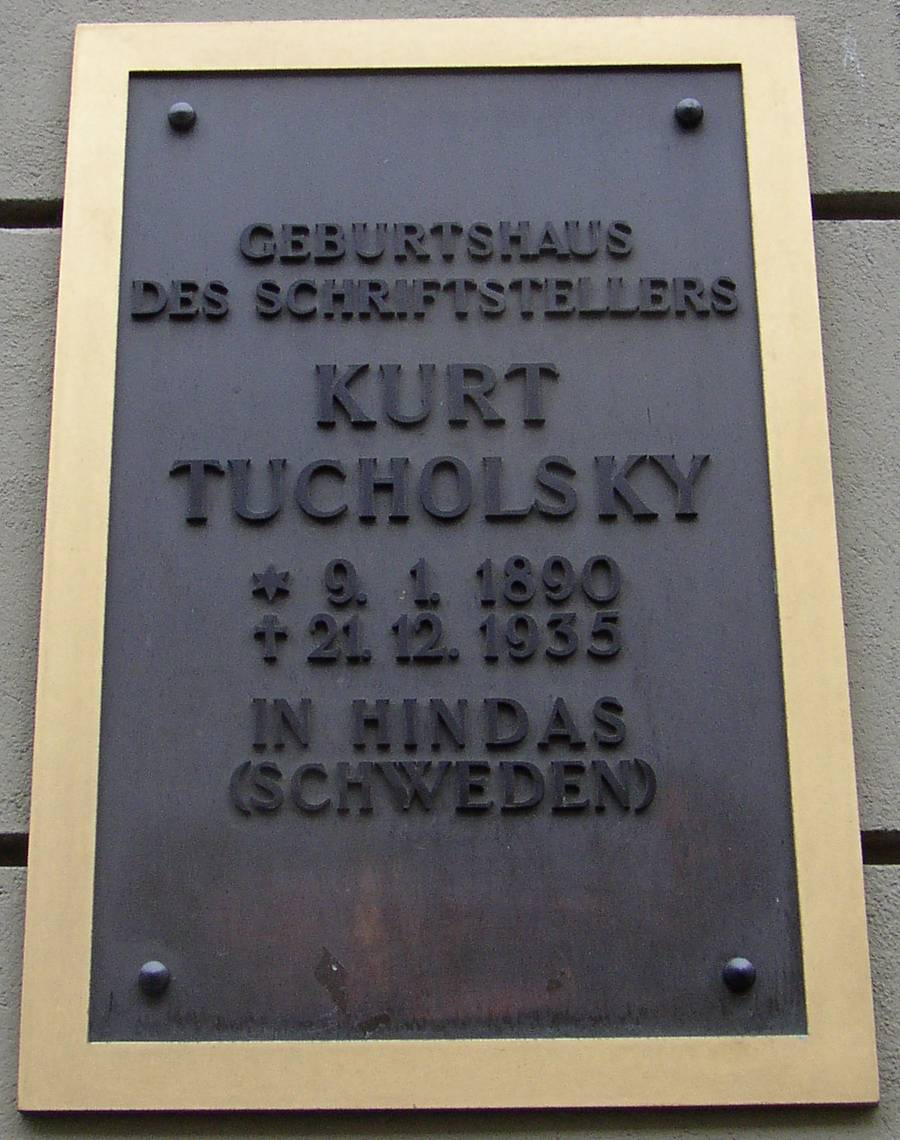
Memorial plaque at his birthplace in Berlin-Moabit (Lübecker Straße 13)

In 1985, the Swedish branch of PEN International started awarding the Tucholsky Prize, a 150 000 SEK grant in memory of Kurt Tucholsky, to a persecuted, threatened or exiled writer or publicist.

The prize has been awarded to the following writers:

| Year | Name | Nation(s) |
|---|---|---|
| 1985 | Adam Zagajewski | Poland |
| 1986 | No prize was awarded | |
| 1987 | Don Mattera | South Africa |
| 1988 | Sherko Bekes | Iraq, Kurdistan |
| 1989 | Augusto Roa Bastos | Paraguay |
| 1990 | Bei Dao | China |
| 1991 | Nuruddin Farah | Somalia |
| 1992 | Salman Rushdie | India |
| 1993 | Mirko Kovač | SFR Yugoslavia |
| 1994 | Taslima Nasrin | Bangladesh |
| 1995 | Shirali Nurmuradov | Turkmenistan |
| 1996 | Svetlana Alexievich | Belarus |
| 1997 | Faraj Sarkohi | Iran |
| 1998 | Vincent P. Magombe | Uganda |
| 1999 | Flora Brovina | Kosovo |
| 2000 | Salim Barakat | Syria, Kurdistan |
| 2001 | Asiye Zeybek Guzel | Turkey |
| 2002 | Rajko Đurić | Serbia, Romani |
| 2003 | Jun Feng | China |
| 2004 | Yvonne Vera | Zimbabwe |
| 2005 | Samir El-Youssef | Palestine |
| 2006 | Nasser Zarafshan | Iran |
| 2007 | Faraj Bayrakdar | Syria |
| 2008 | Lydia Cacho | Mexico |
| 2009 | Dawit Isaak | Eritrea |
| 2010 | Abdul Samay Hamed | Afghanistan |
| 2011 | Uladzimir Nyaklyayew | Belarus |
| 2012 | Samar Yazbek | Syria |
| 2013 | Masha Gessen | Russia |
| 2014 | Muharrem Erbey | Turkey, Kurdistan |
| 2015 | Arkady Babchenko | Russia |
| 2016 | Aslı Erdoğan | Turkey |
| 2017 | Yassin al-Haj Saleh | Syria |
| 2018 | Nasrin Sotoudeh | Iran |
| 2019 | Gui Minhai | China, Sweden |
| 2020 | Maria Ressa | Philippines, USA |
| 2021 | Dmitrij Strotsev | Belarus |
| 2022 | Perhat Tursun | China |
| 2023 | Serhiy Zhadan | Ukraine |
| 2024 | Bushra al-Maqtari | Yemen |

- There is also a German Kurt Tucholsky Prize of €3,000 that is awarded every two years since 1995 by the Kurt Tucholsky Foundation for "committed and succinct literary works".
- Kurt Tucholsky is portrayed in the political/historical comic series Berlin by Jason Lutes.
- 12401 Tucholsky, asteroid.
- Tucholskystraße in Berlin-Mitte is named after Kurt Tucholsky.
- In 1985 Dalida recorded “ Nein, Zärtlich bist du nicht”, which is a Tucholsky’s poem “Sie Zu Ihm” turned into a pop song by Hanne Haller.
