= List of West German films of 1962 =

List of films produced in West Germany in 1962

List of West German films of 1962. Feature films produced and distributed in West Germany in 1962.

== 1962 ==
Title	Director	Cast	Genre	Notes
Aurora Marriage Bureau	Wolfgang Schleif	Eva Bartok, Carlos Thompson, Elisabeth Flickenschildt	Mystery	
Axel Munthe, The Doctor of San Michele	Giorgio Capitani, Rudolf Jugert, Georg Marischka	O. W. Fischer, Rosanna Schiaffino, Sonja Ziemann, Valentina Cortese	Biography	Co-production with France and Italy
The Bellboy and the Playgirls	Francis Ford Coppola, Fritz Umgelter	June Wilkinson	Comedy	Co-production with US
Between Shanghai and St. Pauli	Wolfgang Schleif	Joachim Hansen, Karin Baal, Horst Frank, Bill Ramsey	Adventure	Co-production with Italy
The Bird Seller	Géza von Cziffra	Cornelia Froboess, Peter Weck, Maria Sebaldt	Musical	
Black-White-Red Four Poster	Rolf Thiele	Thomas Fritsch, Daliah Lavi, Marie Versini, Martin Held, Margot Hielscher, Elisabeth Flickenschildt	Comedy	Co-production with France
The Brain	Freddie Francis	Peter van Eyck, Anne Heywood	Science fiction, Thriller	Co-production with the UK
The Bread of Those Early Years	Herbert Vesely	Christian Doermer, Karen Blanguernon, Vera Tschechowa	Drama	Entered into the 1962 Cannes Film Festival
The Burning Court	Julien Duvivier	Nadja Tiller, Jean-Claude Brialy, Perrette Pradier, Claude Rich, Édith Scob, Walter Giller	Thriller	Co-production with France and Italy
Café Oriental	Rudolf Schündler	Elke Sommer, Jerome Courtland, Trude Herr	Musical comedy	
The Carpet of Horror	Harald Reinl	Joachim Fuchsberger, Karin Dor, Werner Peters	Mystery thriller	Co-production with Italy and Spain
Commando	Frank Wisbar	Stewart Granger, Dorian Gray, Hans von Borsody, Dietmar Schönherr, Peter Carsten	War	Co-production with Italy and Spain
The Constant Wife	Tom Pevsner	Lilli Palmer, Peter van Eyck, Carlos Thompson, Dorian Gray	Comedy	
The Devil's Agent	John Paddy Carstairs	Peter van Eyck, Christopher Lee, Marianne Koch	Cold War spy film	Co-production with the UK
Dicke Luft	Rolf von Sydow	Willy Millowitsch, Ingrid van Bergen, Sabine Eggerth, Peter Vogel	Comedy	
Doctor Sibelius	Rudolf Jugert	Lex Barker, Barbara Rütting, Senta Berger	Drama	
The Door with Seven Locks	Alfred Vohrer	Heinz Drache, Sabine Sesselmann, Eddi Arent, Pinkas Braun, Ady Berber, Siegfried Schürenberg, Klaus Kinski	Mystery thriller	Based on Edgar Wallace
Escape from East Berlin	Robert Siodmak	Don Murray, Christine Kaufmann, Ingrid van Bergen, Werner Klemperer	Drama	Co-production with the US
The Forester's Daughter	Franz Josef Gottlieb	Sabine Sinjen, Peter Weck	Musical	
Freddy and the Song of the South Pacific	Werner Jacobs	Freddy Quinn, Jacqueline Sassard, Ralf Wolter	Musical	
Genosse Münchhausen	Wolfgang Neuss	Wolfgang Neuss, Ingrid van Bergen, Corny Collins, Peer Schmidt	Comedy	
The Gypsy Baron	Kurt Wilhelm	Carlos Thompson, Heidi Brühl, Willy Millowitsch	Musical	
The Happy Years of the Thorwalds	Wolfgang Staudte	Elisabeth Bergner, Hansjörg Felmy, Dietmar Schönherr	Drama	
He Can't Stop Doing It	Axel von Ambesser	Heinz Rühmann, Lina Carstens	Mystery, Comedy	
Her Most Beautiful Day	Paul Verhoeven	Inge Meysel, Rudolf Platte, Götz George, Sonja Ziemann	Drama	
His Best Friend	Luis Trenker	Toni Sailer, Dietmar Schönherr, Hans Nielsen	Adventure	
The Hot Port of Hong Kong	Jürgen Roland	Marianne Koch, Klausjürgen Wussow, Horst Frank, Brad Harris	Crime	Co-production with Italy
Hypnosis	Eugenio Martín	Götz George, Jean Sorel, Heinz Drache, Eleonora Rossi Drago, Mara Cruz, Massimo Serato, Margot Trooger, Werner Peters	Thriller	Co-production with Italy and Spain
I Must Go to the City	Hans Deppe	Vico Torriani, Barbara Frey	Musical	
The Inn on the River	Alfred Vohrer	Joachim Fuchsberger, Brigitte Grothum, Elisabeth Flickenschildt, Klaus Kinski, Eddi Arent, Siegfried Schürenberg	Mystery thriller	Based on Edgar Wallace
The Invisible Dr. Mabuse	Harald Reinl	Lex Barker, Karin Dor, Siegfried Lowitz, Werner Peters, Wolfgang Preiss	Thriller	
Kohlhiesel's Daughters	Axel von Ambesser	Liselotte Pulver, Dietmar Schönherr	Comedy	
Liebling, ich muß dich erschießen	Jürgen Goslar	Marianne Koch, Walter Giller	Crime comedy	
Life Begins at Eight	Michael Kehlmann	O. E. Hasse, Johanna Matz, Helmut Wildt	Drama	
Love at Twenty	Marcel Ophuls, François Truffaut, Andrzej Wajda, Shintaro Ishihara, Renzo Rossellini	Barbara Frey, Christian Doermer, Vera Tschechowa, Werner Finck, Jean-Pierre Léaud, Marie-France Pisier, Barbara Lass, Zbigniew Cybulski	Anthology	Co-production with France, Italy, Japan and Poland
Das Mädchen und der Staatsanwalt	Jürgen Goslar	Elke Sommer, Wolfgang Preiss, Götz George	Drama	
Max the Pickpocket	Imo Moszkowicz	Heinz Rühmann, Elfie Pertramer, Hans Clarin	Comedy	
Melody of Hate	Ralph Lothar	Maria Perschy, Horst Frank, Dietmar Schönherr	Thriller	
Only a Woman	Alfred Weidenmann	Maria Schell, Paul Hubschmid	Comedy	
The Phone Rings Every Night	Géza von Cziffra	Elke Sommer, Ingrid Andree, Günter Pfitzmann, Gunther Philipp	Comedy	a.k.a. Nachts ging das Telefon
The Post Has Gone	Helmuth M. Backhaus	Vivi Bach, Adrian Hoven	Musical comedy	
The Puzzle of the Red Orchid	Helmut Ashley	Christopher Lee, Adrian Hoven, Marisa Mell, Klaus Kinski, Eric Pohlmann, Pinkas Braun, Fritz Rasp, Eddi Arent	Mystery thriller	Based on Edgar Wallace
The Red Frenzy	Wolfgang Schleif	Klaus Kinski, Brigitte Grothum, Sieghardt Rupp, Marina Petrova, Dieter Borsche	Thriller	
Redhead	Helmut Käutner	Ruth Leuwerik, Rossano Brazzi, Gert Fröbe	Drama	Co-production with Italy. Entered into the 12th Berlin International Film Festival
The Sand Runs Red	Ernst R. von Theumer	Hellmut Lange, Christiane Nielsen, Ellen Schwiers, Ekrem Bora, Fikret Hakan, Öztürk Serengil	Adventure	Co-production with Turkey
The Secret of the Black Trunk	Werner Klingler	Joachim Hansen, Senta Berger, Hans Reiser, Leonard Steckel, Peter Carsten, Chris Howland	Mystery thriller	
Sherlock Holmes and the Deadly Necklace	Terence Fisher	Christopher Lee, Thorley Walters, Hans Söhnker, Hans Nielsen, Ivan Desny, Senta Berger	Mystery	Co-production with the UK
Snow White and the Seven Jugglers	Kurt Hoffmann	Caterina Valente, Walter Giller, Georg Thomalla	Musical comedy	Co-production with Switzerland
The Sold Grandfather	Hans Albin	Hans Moser, Vivi Bach	Comedy	
Station Six-Sahara	Seth Holt	Carroll Baker, Peter van Eyck, Hansjörg Felmy, Ian Bannen, Denholm Elliott, Mario Adorf	Drama	Co-production with the UK
Street of Temptation	Imo Moszkowicz	Mario Adorf, Karin Baal, Johanna von Koczian	Drama	
Terror After Midnight	Jürgen Goslar	Christine Kaufmann, Martin Held, Christian Doermer	Thriller	a.k.a. The Hours After Midnight
The Testament of Dr. Mabuse	Werner Klingler	Gert Fröbe, Senta Berger, Walter Rilla, Charles Régnier, Harald Juhnke, Wolfgang Preiss	Thriller	a.k.a. The Terror of Doctor Mabuse
Treasure of Silver Lake	Harald Reinl	Lex Barker, Pierre Brice, Herbert Lom, Karin Dor, Götz George, Ralf Wolter	Western	Based on Karl May. Co-production with Yugoslavia and France
The Trial	Orson Welles	Anthony Perkins, Jeanne Moreau, Romy Schneider, Elsa Martinelli, Orson Welles, Akim Tamiroff	Drama	Co-production with France and Italy
The Turkish Cucumbers	Rolf Olsen	Gunther Philipp, Oskar Sima, Susi Nicoletti	Comedy	
Two Bavarians in Bonn	Rudolf Lubowski	Beppo Brem, Lucie Englisch	Comedy	
When the Music Plays at Wörthersee	Hans Grimm	Vivi Bach, Claus Biederstaedt, Grethe Weiser	Musical comedy	
Wild Water	Rudolf Schündler	Marianne Hold, Hans von Borsody	Drama	Co-production with Austria

== Documentaries and television films ==
Title	Director	Cast	Genre	Notes
Der 18. Geburtstag	Peter Lilienthal	Burghild Schreiber	Drama	
Alle Macht der Erde	August Everding	Hans Christian Blech, Agnes Fink	Drama	
Alpenkönig und Menschenfeind	Ludwig Berger	Hans Putz, Kurt Jaggberg, Ulli Philipp, Werner Pochath	Comedy	a.k.a. Der Alpenkönig und der Menschenfeind
Alvorada	Hugo Niebeling		Documentary	a.k.a. Alvorada – Brazil's Changing Face. Entered into the 1963 Cannes Film Festival
Anatol	Otto Schenk	Peter Weck, Gerlinde Locker, Christiane Hörbiger	Comedy	
Anfrage	Egon Monk	Hartmut Reck	Drama	
Any Other Business	Peter Beauvais	Claus Biederstaedt, Fritz Tillmann, Alexander Kerst, Reinhard Kolldehoff	Drama	a.k.a. Letzter Punkt der Tagesordnung
The Beaver Coat	John Olden	Inge Meysel, Ernst Schröder	Comedy	
Becket	Rainer Wolffhardt	Heinz Baumann, Heinrich Schweiger	Drama	
The Big Scene	Wolfgang Liebeneiner	Viktor de Kowa, Antje Weisgerber, Jochen Brockmann, Peter Arens	Drama	a.k.a. Die große Szene
Blood Wedding	Oswald Döpke	Krista Keller, Hartmut Reck, Günther Tabor	Drama	
Blum Affair	Robert A. Stemmle	Leonard Steckel, Paul Dahlke	Crime, Docudrama	
A Book with Chapters in It	John Olden	Stephan Schwartz, Käthe Gold, Robert Müller, Walter Bluhm	Drama	a.k.a. Ein Buch mit Kapiteln
The Browning Version	Karl Fruchtmann	Wolfgang Büttner, Dagmar Altrichter	Drama	a.k.a. Das Abschiedsgeschenk
Bubusch	Erik Ode	Ernst Stankovski, Ernst Fritz Fürbringer, Brigitte Mira, Helga Anders	Comedy	
The Castle	Sylvain Dhomme	Heinz Bennent, Ingmar Zeisberg	Drama	
Cécile	Hans Dieter Schwarze	Carl-Heinz Schroth, Loni von Friedl, Grit Boettcher	Comedy	a.k.a. Cécile ... oder Die Schule der Väter a.k.a. Cécile ou l'École des pères
Child of the Revolution	Rolf Hädrich	Christian Doermer, Bruno Dietrich, Siegfried Wischnewski, Dorothea Wieck	Drama	a.k.a. Die Revolution entlässt ihre Kinder
The Collection	Klaus Wagner	Robert Freitag, Eva Maria Meineke	Drama	a.k.a. Die Kollektion
The Conflagration	John Olden	Inge Meysel, Rudolf Platte	Drama	a.k.a. Der rote Hahn
Daphne Laureola	Heinz Wilhelm Schwarz	Brigitte Horney	Comedy	
The Deep Blue Sea	Raoul Wolfgang Schnell	Margot Trooger, Erik Schumann, Albert Lieven	Drama	a.k.a. Lockende Tiefe
Diamantenwirbel	Trude Kolman	Hans Clarin, Eva Maria Meineke, Grit Boettcher, Lukas Ammann	Comedy	
Don't Listen, Ladies!	Wolfgang Glück	Johannes Heesters	Comedy	a.k.a. Nicht zuhören, meine Damen! Co-production with Austria
Egmont	Reinhart Spörri	Max Eckard, Wolfgang Büttner, Paul Verhoeven, Lola Müthel, Rolf Becker, Irene Marhold	Drama	
Escape	Volker von Collande	Alexander Kerst, Hanne Wieder	Crime	a.k.a. Die Flucht
Ever Since Paradise	Paul Verhoeven	Cordula Trantow, Matthias Fuchs, Harald Leipnitz, Hannelore Schroth, Paul Verhoeven	Comedy	a.k.a. Seit Adam und Eva
Die Feuertreppe	Ludwig Cremer	Konrad Georg, Benno Sterzenbach, Karl-Georg Saebisch, Edda Seippel	Drama	a.k.a. The Remarkable Incident at Carson Corners
Flying Clipper	Hermann Leitner, Rudolf Nussgruber		Documentary	a.k.a. Mediterranean Holiday. Entered into the 3rd Moscow International Film Festival
French Without Tears	Franz Reichert	Erika Pluhar	Comedy	a.k.a. Parlez-vous français?
Frost at Midnight	Wilhelm Semmelroth	Marianne Mosa, Hanns Ernst Jäger, Stanislav Ledinek, Frithjof Vierock	Drama	a.k.a. Um Mitternacht
Der fünfzigste Geburtstag	Gustav Burmester	Hilde Körber	Drama	a.k.a. Der 50. Geburtstag
Gabriel Schilling's Flight	William Dieterle	Thomas Holtzmann, Gisela Mattishent, Krista Keller, Günter Pfitzmann	Drama	a.k.a. Gabriel Schillings Flucht
Die Glocken von London	Wilm ten Haaf	Georg Lehn	Drama	a.k.a. The Chimes
Golden Boy	John Olden	Klaus Kammer, Hildegard Knef, René Deltgen	Drama	
Heroische Komödie	Edward Rothe	Maria Wimmer, Heinz Bennent, Alexander Kerst, Romuald Pekny	Drama	
Das Halstuch	Hans Quest	Heinz Drache, Albert Lieven, Margot Trooger, Dieter Borsche, Hellmut Lange, Christian Doermer, Horst Tappert, Eva Pflug	Mystery thriller	a.k.a. The Scarf
I Remember Mama	Thomas Engel	Heli Finkenzeller, Brigitte Grothum, Volker Lechtenbrink, Gerhard Geisler, Walther Süssenguth	Comedy	a.k.a. So war Mama
The Innocents	Ludwig Cremer	Gertrud Kückelmann	Horror	a.k.a. The Turn of the Screw a.k.a. Die sündigen Engel
Jeder stirbt für sich allein	Falk Harnack	Edith Schultze-Westrum, Alfred Schieske, Werner Peters	Drama, War	a.k.a. Every Man Dies Alone a.k.a. Everyone Dies Alone
Einen Jux will er sich machen	Michael Kehlmann	Fritz Eckhardt, Helmuth Lohner, Helmut Qualtinger	Comedy	
Karl III. und Anna von Österreich	Kurt Wilhelm	Robert Graf, Gerlinde Locker	Comedy	
Karol	Rolf Hädrich	Mario Adorf, Max Noack, Georg Bahmann	Black comedy	
Kümmert euch nicht um Sokrates – Ein Abend mit dem "Gorgias" des Platon	Walter Rilla	Heinz Moog	Drama	
Laura	Franz Josef Wild	Hildegard Knef, Anton Walbrook, Hellmut Lange	Mystery thriller	
Life of Galileo	Egon Monk	Ernst Schröder	Drama	a.k.a. Leben des Galilei
The Little Foxes	Peter Beauvais	Gisela Uhlen, Dieter Borsche, Dunja Movar, Walther Süssenguth, Siegfried Schürenberg, Erika Dannhoff, Werner Pochath	Comedy	
Little Lord Fauntleroy	Franz Josef Wild	Albrecht Schoenhals, Manfred Kunst, Gertrud Kückelmann, Eric Pohlmann	Family	
Lokalbericht	Rainer Wolffhardt	Gerd Baltus	Drama	
The Marquis of Keith	Axel Corti	Charles Régnier, Maria Sebaldt, Herbert Fleischmann	Drama	
Montserrat	Fritz Umgelter	Robert Graf, Wolfgang Kieling	Drama	
Murder in the Cathedral	Hans Lietzau	Gerd Brüdern, Pinkas Braun, Wolfgang Kieling, Benno Sterzenbach, Romuald Pekny	Drama	a.k.a. Mord im Dom
Nachruf auf Jürgen Trahnke	Rolf Hädrich	Ernst Jacobi, Anneli Granget, Paul Edwin Roth	Drama	
Nie hab ich nie gesagt	Allan A. Buckhantz	Georg Thomalla, Violetta Ferrari, Uwe Friedrichsen, Susanne Cramer	Comedy	
A Night in Venice	Kurt Wilhelm	Hans von Borsody, Christiane Hörbiger, Karl Paryla, Ljuba Welitsch	Musical	
Nur eine Karaffe	Wilhelm Semmelroth	Tilla Durieux	Drama	a.k.a. Le Carafon
Old Acquaintance	Jürgen Goslar	Gisela Peltzer, Edith Teichmann, Wolfgang Lukschy, Marion Michael, Ernst Jacobi	Drama	a.k.a. Meine beste Freundin
Papiermühle	Hans Dieter Schwarze	Viktor de Kowa, Erik Schumann, Grit Boettcher	Comedy	
The Parallel Street	Ferdinand Khittl	Friedrich Joloff, Herbert Tiede, Henry van Lyck	Experimental	
Patsy	Heinz Wilhelm Schwarz	Marion Michael, Walter Richter, Alice Treff, Günther Tabor	Comedy	a.k.a. The Patsy
Peter Pan	Paul Verhoeven	Fernando Möller, Helga Anders, Alfred Balthoff, Heinz-Leo Fischer, Georg Lehn	Family	
The Pleasure Of Honesty	William Dieterle	Lothar Blumhagen, Uta Sax, Harald Leipnitz	Comedy	a.k.a. Das Vergnügen, anständig zu sein
The Possessed	Michael Kehlmann	Helmuth Lohner, Hans Clarin, Klausjürgen Wussow, Ida Krottendorf, Leopold Rudolf	Drama	a.k.a. Demons
Die Rebellion	Wolfgang Staudte	Josef Meinrad	Drama	
Rose Bernd	Gustav Burmester	Ida Krottendorf, Marianne Hoppe, Bruno Dallansky, Erwin Linder, Carl Wery	Drama	
Santa Cruz	Imo Moszkowicz	Werner Hinz, Pinkas Braun, Eva Zilcher, Kornelia Boje	Drama	
Der Schlaf der Gerechten	Rolf Hädrich	Hilde Krahl	War, Drama	a.k.a. Das Brandopfer
Schönes Wochenende	Peter Beauvais	Uwe Friedrichsen, Katrin Schaake, Christiane Nielsen, Lotti Krekel, Walter Jokisch, Maria Paudler, Maria Sebaldt	Comedy	
Seelenwanderung	Rainer Erler	Wolfgang Reichmann, Hanns Lothar	Fantasy	a.k.a. Transmigration of Souls
Sorry, Wrong Number	Paul Verhoeven	Ingrid Andree, Harald Leipnitz, Siegfried Lowitz	Thriller	
South	Gerhard Klingenberg	Michael Degen, Helmut Förnbacher	Drama	a.k.a. Süden
Stück für Stück	Peter Lilienthal	Jens-Peter Erichsen, Eva Brumby, Heinz Schubert	Drama	
Theorie und Praxis	Erik Ode	Ernst Stankovski	Comedy	
Der Unschuldige	Wolfgang Glück	Attila Hörbiger	Crime comedy	Co-production with Austria
Wallenstein	Franz Peter Wirth	Wilhelm Borchert, Karl Michael Vogler, Ernst Fritz Fürbringer, Wolfgang Kieling	Drama	
Waltz of the Toreadors	Peter Beauvais	Martin Held, Marianne Hoppe	Comedy	
Warten auf Dodo	Rolf von Sydow	Harald Leipnitz, Hans Caninenberg, Sabine Eggerth	Comedy	
Your Obedient Servant	Thomas Engel	Peter Pasetti, Elfriede Kuzmany, Werner Finck, Ulli Philipp	Comedy	a.k.a. Ihr gehorsamer Diener

== Bibliography ==
- Bergfelder, Tim. International Adventures: German Popular Cinema and European Co-Productions in the 1960s. Berghahn Books, 2005.

== See also ==
- List of Austrian films of 1962
- List of East German films of 1962
