= The Sold Grandfather (1962 film) =

1962 film

- Directed by: Hans Albin
- Written by: Ilse Lotz-Dupont
- Produced by: Franz Seitz
- Starring: Hans Moser; Vivi Bach; Hubert von Meyerinck
- Cinematography: Heinz Schnackertz
- Edited by: Ingeborg Taschner
- Production company: Franz Seitz Filmproduktion
- Distributed by: Constantin Film
- Release date: 23 March 1962
- Running time: 98 minutes
- Country: West Germany
- Language: German

The Sold Grandfather (German: Der verkaufte Großvater) is a 1962 West German comedy film directed by Hans Albin and starring Hans Moser, Vivi Bach and Hubert von Meyerinck. It is a remake of the 1942 film of the same title and is based on a play of the same name.

It was shot at the Bavaria Studios in Munich. The film's sets were designed by the art director Max Mellin.

== Cast ==
- Hans Moser as Nikodemus Gröberl, Kreithofer-Großvater
- Vivi Bach as Eva 'Ev' Dünkelberg, Tochter
- Hubert von Meyerinck as Friedrich Wilhelm Dünkelberg
- Beppo Brem as Hias, Hoteldiener
- Harald Juhnke as Max Krause
- Ruth Stephan as Frl. Schülke, Sekretärin
- Michl Lang as Haslinger, Wirt
- Erika von Thellmann as Mathilde Dünkelberg
- Thomas Alder as Michael Kreithofer, Apotheker
- Lolita as Zenzi
- Ted Herold as himself
- Fredy Brock as himself
- Hans Fitz as Kreithofer
- Max Greger as Musikorchester
- Ingeborg Lapsien as Mathildes Freundin
- Frederik van Pallandt as himself
- Maria Stadler as Apollonia, Haushälterin
- Hans Terofal as Loisl
- Nina van Pallandt as herself
- Maria Singer

== Bibliography ==
- Bock, Hans-Michael & Bergfelder, Tim. The Concise CineGraph. Encyclopedia of German Cinema. Berghahn Books, 2009.
