= Waldrausch =

Waldrausch may refer to:

- Waldrausch (novel), a 1907 German novel by Ludwig Ganghofer
- Waldrausch (1939 film), a film adaptation
- Waldrausch (1962 film), a film adaptation
- Waldrausch (1977 film), a film adaptation
