= The Sold Grandfather (1942 film) =

1942 film

- Directed by: Joe Stöckel
- Written by: Philipp Lothar Mayring; Joe Stöckel
- Starring: Josef Eichheim; Oskar Sima; Winnie Markus
- Cinematography: Heinz Schnackertz
- Edited by: Gottlieb Madl
- Music by: Toni Thoms
- Production company: Bavaria Film
- Distributed by: Deutsche Filmvertriebs
- Release date: 26 March 1942
- Running time: 100 minutes
- Country: Germany
- Language: German

The Sold Grandfather (German: Der verkaufte Großvater) is a 1942 German comedy film directed by Joe Stöckel and starring Josef Eichheim, Oskar Sima and Winnie Markus. It was based on a play which was later adapted into a 1962 film of the same name.

It was shot at the Bavaria Studios in Munich and on location around Maria Alm in Austria. The film's sets were designed by the art directors Kurt Dürnhöfer and Max Seefelder.

== Cast ==
- Josef Eichheim as Großvater Nikodemus
- Oskar Sima as Vater Haslinger
- Winnie Markus as Ev Haslinger
- Elise Aulinger as Mutter Haslinger
- Carl Wery as Vater Kreithofer
- Albert Janscheck as Lois Kreithofer
- Erna Fentsch as Magd Zenz
- Wastl Witt as Bauer Eibensteiner
- Erhard Siedel as Fabrikant Obermann
- Wilhelmine Fröhlich as Besitzerin einer Ballwurfbude
- Thea Aichbichler
- Margot Berger
- Franz Fröhlich
- Michl Lang
- Franz Loskarn
- Anneliese Moerke
- Alfred Pongratz
- Willy Stock
- Betty Stöcklein
- Gudrum Söhn
- Melanie Webelhorst
- Maria Elisabeth Weixner

== Bibliography ==
- Alfred Krautz. International directory of cinematographers, set- and costume designers in film, Volume 4. Saur, 1984.
