= Holiday From Myself =

Holiday From Myself may refer to:

- Holiday From Myself (1934 film), a 1934 German comedy film
- Holiday From Myself (1952 film), a 1952 West German comedy film
