= The Sold Grandfather =

The Sold Grandfather (German: Der verkaufte Großvater) may refer to:

- The Sold Grandfather a play by the German writer Anton Hamik
- The Sold Grandfather (1942 film), a German film adaptation
- The Sold Grandfather (1962 film), a West German film adaptation
