= What Is Father Doing in Italy? =

1961 film

- Directed by: Hans Dieter Schwarze
- Written by: Ilse Lotz-Dupont
- Produced by: Franz Seitz
- Starring: Willy Fritsch; Gerhard Riedmann; Peter Kraus
- Cinematography: Dieter Wedekind
- Music by: Henry Mayer
- Production company: Franz Seitz Filmproduktion
- Distributed by: Constantin Film
- Release date: 8 September 1961
- Running time: 97 minutes
- Country: West Germany
- Language: German

What Is Father Doing in Italy? (German: Was macht Papa denn in Italien?) is a 1961 West German musical comedy film directed by Hans Dieter Schwarze and starring Willy Fritsch, Gerhard Riedmann and Peter Kraus. It was shot in Agfacolor at the Göttingen Studios. The film's sets were designed by the art director Max Mellin.

== Cast ==
- Willy Fritsch as Studienrat Hanselmann
- Gerhard Riedmann as Amilare Barnabas
- Peter Kraus as Klaus Stumpf
- Claus Biederstaedt as Matthias Daniel
- Jane Tilden as Therese Hanselmann
- Barbara Frey as Sabine
- Monika Dahlberg as Sophie
- Mara Lane as Nadja Lamar
- Werner Finck as Direktor Schlosser
- Alwy Becker as Christine
- Rudolf Rhomberg as Signore Nobile
- Elke Aberle as Tönchen
- Peter W. Staub as Zöllner Dubi
- Charlotte Witthauer as Frau Moll
- Joachim Wichmann
- Harald Juhnke as Herr Akaschian
- Ralf Bendix as Singer
- Siw Malmkvist as Singer
- Gaby King as Gabriele / Singer

== Bibliography ==
- Bock, Hans-Michael & Bergfelder, Tim. The Concise CineGraph. Encyclopedia of German Cinema. Berghahn Books, 2009.
