= Isola Bella (film) =

1961 film

- Directed by: Hans Grimm
- Written by: Ilse Lotz-Dupont
- Produced by: Franz Seitz; Hans Terofal
- Starring: Marianne Hold; Paul Hubschmid; Monika Dahlberg
- Cinematography: Heinz Schnackertz
- Edited by: Ingeborg Taschner
- Music by: Erwin Halletz; Werner Scharfenberger
- Production company: Franz Seitz Filmproduktion
- Distributed by: Europa-Filmverleih
- Release date: 3 November 1961
- Running time: 94 minutes
- Country: West Germany
- Language: German

Isola Bella is a 1961 West German comedy film directed by Hans Grimm and starring Marianne Hold, Paul Hubschmid and Monika Dahlberg. It is mainly set in the Italian-speaking Swiss region of Ticino.

The film's sets were designed by the art director Max Mellin. It was shot in agfacolor.

== Cast ==
- Marianne Hold as Anne Stülcken
- Paul Hubschmid as Götz Renner
- Monika Dahlberg as Ulrike Höfler
- Claus Biederstaedt as Hubert Bergmann
- Willy Fritsch as Konsul Stülcken
- Ruth Stephan as Frl. Finkenbusch
- Oliver Grimm as Jakob
- Harald Juhnke as Anton
- Michl Lang as Weinbauer
- Rudolf Schündler as Dr. Bergmann
- Hanita Hallan as Eva
- Herbert Hübner
- Erik Jelde as Guttmann
- Ferdinand Anton
- Lolita as Monika
- Barbro Svensson as Gesang
- Gus Backus as Gesang
- Carlos Otero as Gesang
- Max Greger
- Karin Heske

== Bibliography ==
- Bock, Hans-Michael & Bergfelder, Tim. The Concise CineGraph. Encyclopedia of German Cinema. Berghahn Books, 2009.
