= When the Grapevines Bloom on the Danube =

1965 film

- Directed by: Géza von Cziffra
- Written by: Ilse Lotz-Dupont; Joe Lederer
- Produced by: Franz Seitz
- Starring: Hansjörg Felmy; Ingeborg Schöner; Peter Weck
- Cinematography: Heinz Pehlke
- Edited by: Elisabeth Patek; Jane Seitz
- Music by: Rolf Alexander Wilhelm
- Production companies: Franz Seitz Filmproduktion; Wiener Stadthalle-Station Betriebs-und Produktionsgesellschaft
- Distributed by: Nora-Filmverleih
- Release date: 15 October 1965
- Running time: 80 minutes
- Countries: Austria; West Germany
- Language: German

When the Grapevines Bloom on the Danube (German: An der Donau, wenn der Wein blüht) is a 1965 Austrian-West German comedy film of the heimatfilm genre directed by Géza von Cziffra and starring Hansjörg Felmy, Ingeborg Schöner and Peter Weck. The cinematographer was Heinz Pehlke. It was shot in Eastmancolor and Cinemascope using the Sievering Studios in Vienna and on location around Passau, Linz and the Wachau valley. The film's sets were designed by the art director Hertha Hareiter.

== Cast ==
- Hansjörg Felmy as Frank Richter
- Ingeborg Schöner as Gabriele Welser
- Gaston Brocksieper as Florian Richter
- Peter Weck as Dr. Walter Kuntz
- Letícia Román as Susi Müller
- Elisabeth Markus as Hofrätin Welser
- Richard Eybner as Diener Ferdinand
- Ottilie Iwald as Frau Beck
- Edd Stavjanik as Chauffeur Martin
- Hans Habietinek as Tagportier
- Fritz Puchstein as Nachtportier

== Bibliography ==
- Von Dassanowsky, Robert. Austrian Cinema: A History. McFarland, 2005.
