= Jane Seitz =

German film editor

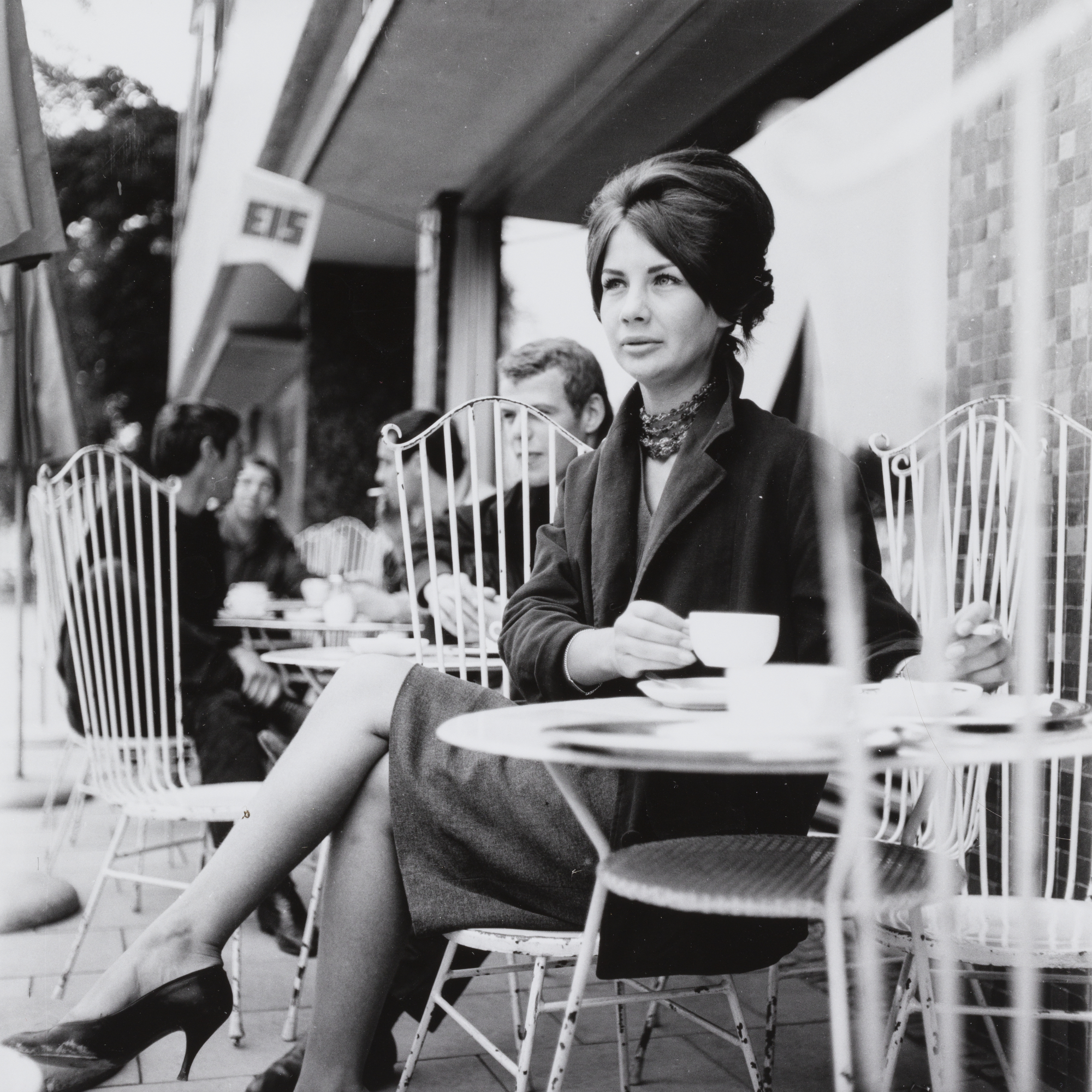
- Born: 17 August 1942; Germany
- Died: 4 January 1988 (aged 45)
- Other name: Juliane Sperr
- Occupation: Film editor

Jane Seitz (also known as Juliane Sperr; 17 August 1942 – 4 January 1988) was a German film editor. Seitz edited different films produced by Bernd Eichinger. She was his girlfriend for some time and committed suicide at the age of 45. Her last editorial credit was for the comedy film Felix, released in September 1988. Wolfgang Rihm orchestrated 1988/89 a text written by Seitz’ former partner Wolf Wondratschek Mein Tod. Requiem in memoriam Jane S. for soprano and orchestra.

== Films (incomplete list) ==
- 1965: When the Grapevines Bloom on the Danube
- 1965: The Swedish Girl
- 1966: Onkel Filser – Allerneueste Lausbubengeschichten
- 1967: When Ludwig Goes on Manoeuvres
- 1968: Hunting Scenes from Bavaria
- 1969: That Guy Loves Me, Am I Supposed to Believe That?
- 1970: Deadlock
- 1970: Student of the Bedroom
- 1970: Die Feuerzangenbowle
- 1971: Supergirl
- 1974: Supermarket
- 1975: Katie Tippel
- 1976: Coup de Grâce
- 1977: Soldier of Orange
- 1977: The Conquest of the Citadel
- 1978: Moritz, Dear Moritz
- 1981: Christiane F. – We Children from Bahnhof Zoo
- 1982: Comeback
- 1984: The Neverending Story
- 1985: The Assault of the Present on the Rest of Time
- 1986: The Name of the Rose
- 1986: Miscellaneous News
- 1988: Felix (posthumous)

== Literature ==
- Katja Eichinger: BE, Hoffmann und Campe, Hamburg, 2012, ISBN 978-3455502534
- Julia Knight: Women and the New German Cinema (Questions for Feminism), 1992, ISBN 978-0860913528
