= That Can Happen to Anyone =

1952 film

- Directed by: Paul Verhoeven
- Written by: Edgar Kahn; Hans Schweikart
- Produced by: Luggi Waldleitner
- Starring: Heinz Rühmann; Gisela Schmidting; Gustav Knuth
- Cinematography: Konstantin Irmen-Tschet; Pitt Peters
- Edited by: Luise Dreyer-Sachsenberg
- Music by: Lotar Olias
- Production company: Komet-Film
- Distributed by: Panorama-Film
- Release date: 30 May 1952
- Running time: 91 minutes
- Country: West Germany
- Language: German

That Can Happen to Anyone (German: Das kann jedem passieren) is a 1952 West German comedy film directed by Paul Verhoeven and starring Heinz Rühmann, Gisela Schmidting, and Gustav Knuth. It was made at the Bavaria Studios in Munich. The film's sets were designed by the art directors Hans Sohnle and Fritz Lück.

== Synopsis ==
Hugo Brinkmeyer, a tax consultant, takes his wife Gerda out to the cabaret one evening. There he encounters a potential client, the wealthy businessman Schwidders. A series of mix-ups lead to Hugo being suspected of both incompetence at his job and being unfaithful to his wife.

== Cast ==
- Heinz Rühmann as Hugo Brinkmeyer
- Gisela Schmidting as Frau Gerda Brinkmeyer
- Gustav Knuth as Herr Schwidders
- Ingrid Lutz as Rita
- Werner Fuetterer as Paul Süsskind
- Alice Treff as Frau Schwidders
- Hubert von Meyerinck as Walputzke
- Fritz Imhoff as Peppi
- Hans Leibelt as Buttermann
- Bum Krüger as Stahlschmidt
- Iska Geri as Singer
- Helmuth M. Backhaus as Conferénce
- Liesl Karlstadt as Frau Baschke
- Michl Lang as Herr Baschke
- Doris Kiesow as Frau Hohmann
- Käthe Itter
- Karl Schwelling as Schwidders' twin son
- Peter Schwelling as Schwidders' twin son

== Bibliography ==
- Rentschler, Eric, ed. (2013). German Film and Literature: Adaptations and Transformations. Hoboken: Routledge. ISBN 978-1-136-36873-8.
