= San Salvatore (film) =

1956 West German drama film

- Directed by: Werner Jacobs
- Written by: Hans Kades (novel); Felix Lützkendorf
- Produced by: Carl Wilhelm Tetting
- Starring: Dieter Borsche; Antje Weisgerber; Will Quadflieg
- Cinematography: Heinz Schnackertz
- Edited by: Lisbeth Neumann
- Music by: Herbert Jarczyk
- Production company: Rotary-Film
- Distributed by: Schorcht Filmverleih; Sascha Film (Austria)
- Release date: 9 March 1956
- Running time: 95 minutes
- Country: West Germany
- Language: German

San Salvatore is a 1956 West German drama film directed by Werner Jacobs and starring Dieter Borsche, Antje Weisgerber and Will Quadflieg. It was shot at the Bavaria Studios in Munich and the Wandsbek Studios in Hamburg. Location filming took place in the St. Pauli district and Lugano in Switzerland. The film's sets were designed by the art directors Franz Bi and Bruno Monden.

== Cast ==
- Will Quadflieg as Doctor Manfred Carell
- Dieter Borsche as Doctor Robert Kant
- Antje Weisgerber as Dagmar Gerken
- Carl Wery as Schriftsteller Althoff
- Marianne Wischmann as Doctor Katharina Hallberg
- Charles Regnier as Doctor Monthé
- Hanna Rucker as Trude Monthé
- Rudolf Fernau as Doctor Stormer
- Friedrich Domin as Doctor Breymann
- Hans Leibelt as Professor Weber
- Arnulf Schröder as Studienrat Heider
- Herbert Hübner as Professor Brink
- Michl Lang as Gärtner Xaver
