= I Am Looking for a Man =

1966 film

- Directed by: Alfred Weidenmann
- Written by: Herbert Reinecker
- Produced by: Franz Seitz; Klaus Stapenhorst
- Starring: Ghita Nørby; Walter Giller; Brigitte Horney
- Cinematography: Wolf Wirth
- Edited by: Ingeborg Taschner
- Music by: Peter Thomas
- Production company: Franz Seitz Filmproduktion
- Distributed by: Nora Film
- Release date: 3 February 1966
- Running time: 83 minutes
- Country: West Germany
- Language: German

I Am Looking for a Man (German: Ich suche einen Mann) is a 1966 West German romantic comedy film directed by Alfred Weidenmann and starring Ghita Nørby, Walter Giller and Brigitte Horney.

== Cast ==
- Ghita Nørby as Barbara Schönfelder
- Walter Giller as Dr. Pleskau
- Brigitte Horney as Helene Schmidt
- Harald Leipnitz as Gregor
- Monika Dahlberg as Ursula Bode
- Stefan Wigger as Albert Bode
- Sieghardt Rupp as Direktor Voss
- Gerd Baltus as Studientrat Benzinger
- Jean Valmont as Hans Peteer Winkler
- Adeline Wagner as Helga Voss
- Rudolf Rhomberg as Hoteldirektor Bock
- Georg Thomalla as Astrologe Neumann
- Balduin Baas as Artist Pauli
- Hans Putz as Bauunternehmer Märtens
- Claus Ringer as Student Erich
- Paul Hubschmid as Baron Federsen

== Bibliography ==
- James Robert Parish. Film Actors Guide. Scarecrow Press, 1977.
