= Carola Höhn =

German actress (1910–2005)

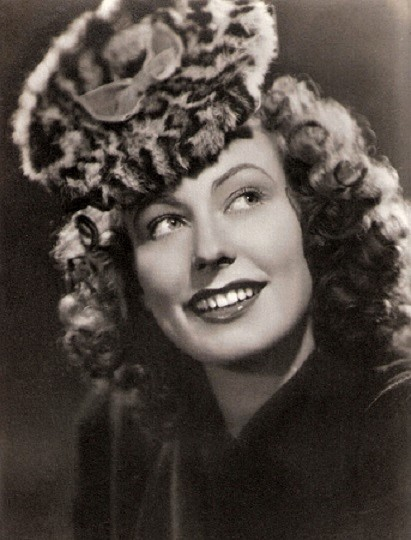
- Höhn in 1941
- Born: Karoline Minna Höhn; 30 January 1910; Geestemünde, Hanover, Prussia, German Empire
- Died: 8 November 2005 (aged 95); Grünwald, Bavaria, Germany
- Occupation: Actress
- Years active: 1928–2000

Carola Höhn (30 January 1910 – 8 November 2005) was a German actress.

== Selected filmography ==
=== Film ===
- The Weekend Bride (1928)
- Don Juan in a Girls' School (1928)
- From a Bachelor's Diary (1929)
- Youthful Indiscretion (1929)
- The Living Corpse (1929)
- Charley's Aunt (1934)
- Holiday From Myself (1934)
- Just Once a Great Lady (1934)
- April, April! (1935)
- Every Day Isn't Sunday (1935)
- The Old and the Young King (1935)
- The Royal Waltz (1935)
- The Haunted Castle (1936)
- The Beggar Student (1936)
- To New Shores (1937)
- Comrades at Sea (1938)
- Hurrah! I'm a Father (1939)
- The Green Emperor (1939)
- We Danced Around the World (1939)
- Beatrice Cenci (1941)
- Light of Heart (1943)
- Why Are You Lying, Elisabeth? (1944)
- The Rabanser Case (1950)
- Toxi (1952)
- The Exchange (1952)
- Weekend in Paradise (1952)
- Such a Charade (1953)
- The Country Schoolmaster (1954)
- Sun Over the Adriatic (1954)
- I'll See You at Lake Constance (1956)
- Victor and Victoria (1957)
- I Must Go to the City (1962)

=== Television ===
- Derrick – Season 4, Episode 2: "Hals in der Schlinge" (1977)
- Derrick – Season 5, Episode 9: "Lissas Vater" (1978)
- Derrick – Season 6, Episode 10: "Das dritte Opfer" (1979)
- Derrick – Season 7, Episode 11: "Pricker" (1980)

== Honours ==
- 1989 Bavarian Film Awards
- 1990 Deutscher Filmpreis
- 1999 Federal Cross of Merit on Ribbon
