= Ingeborg Taschner =

German film editor

- Born: 26 March 1930; Munich, Bavaria, Germany
- Died: 5 September 2002 (aged 72)
- Occupation: Film editor
- Years active: 1958–1983 (film)

Ingeborg Taschner (26 March 1930 – 5 September 2002) was a former German film editor. She was married to fellow editor Herbert Taschner with whom she had an actor son Kai Taschner. She worked for many years for Bavaria Film in her native Munich.

== Selected filmography ==
- The Green Devils of Monte Cassino (1958)
- My Sweetheart Is from Tyrol (1958)
- At Blonde Kathrein's Place (1959)
- The Scarlet Baroness (1959)
- Isola Bella (1961)
- I Must Go to the City (1962)
- The Sold Grandfather (1962)
- Venusberg (1963)
- Aunt Frieda (1965)
- The Blood of the Walsungs (1965)
- I Am Looking for a Man (1966)
- Once a Greek (1966)
- Love Nights in the Taiga (1967)
- The Death of a Double (1967)
- The Duck Rings at Half Past Seven (1968)
- All People Will Be Brothers (1973)
- Hubertus Castle (1973)
- Only the Wind Knows the Answer (1974)
- Three Men in the Snow (1974)
- Crime After School (1975)
- Silence in the Forest (1976)
- Waldrausch (1977)

== Bibliography ==
- Torsten Körner. Der kleine Mann als Star: Heinz Rühmann und seine Filme der 50er Jahre. Campus Verlag, 2001.
