= Escape to the Dolomites =

1955 film

- Directed by: Luis Trenker
- Written by: Gustav K. Bienek (novel); Pier Paolo Pasolini; Giorgio Bassani; Luis Trenker
- Produced by: Francesco Donato
- Starring: Luis Trenker; Marianne Hold; Yvonne Sanson
- Cinematography: Albert Benitz; Enzo Oddone
- Edited by: Ludolf Grisebach; Aldo Quinti
- Music by: Giorgio Fabor
- Production companies: Bardo Film; Primus Film
- Distributed by: Kopp-Filmverleih
- Release date: 30 December 1955
- Running time: 101 minutes
- Country: West Germany
- Language: German

Escape to the Dolomites (German: Flucht in die Dolomiten, Italian: Il prigioniero della montagna) is a 1955 Italian-West German drama film directed by and starring Luis Trenker. The cast also features Marianne Hold, Robert Freitag and Yvonne Sanson. It was shot at the Icet Studios in Milan and on location around Lake Garda and the Fiemme Valley in Trentino.

== Synopsis ==
Giovanni Testa, a shipbuilder on Lake Garda, is accused of murdering his brother, who refused to loan him some money in order to rescue his business.

== Cast ==
- Luis Trenker as Giovanni Testa
- Marianne Hold as Graziella
- Robert Freitag as Sergio
- Yvonne Sanson as Teresa
- Enrico Glori as Bepo Ghezzi
- Umberto Sacripante as Padre di Graziella
- Marcello Giorda as Ragionier Massaro
- Hans Jamnig as Dolomites guide
- Vincenz Nacker as Dolomites guide
- Phillip Prinoth as Dolomites guide
- Flavio Pancherias Dolomites guide
- Hans Hammig as Hans
- Vincenzo Nocker as Enzo
- Filippo Primod as Bepi
- Alda Quinti as Figlia di Giovanni

== Bibliography ==
- Reimer, Robert C. Cultural History Through a National Socialist Lens: Essays on the Cinema of the Third Reich. Camden House, 2002.
