= The Green Devils of Monte Cassino =

1958 film

- Directed by: Harald Reinl
- Written by: J. Joachim Bartsch; Rudolf Böhmler; Albert Armin Lerche; Michael Graf Saltikow
- Produced by: Franz Seitz
- Starring: Dieter Eppler; Joachim Fuchsberger; Antje Geerk; Ewald Balser
- Cinematography: Ernst W. Kalinke
- Edited by: Sophie Himpele; Ingeborg Taschner
- Music by: Rolf A. Wilhelm
- Production company: Franz Seitz Filmproduktion
- Distributed by: Constantin Film
- Release date: 23 April 1958
- Running time: 94 minutes
- Country: West Germany
- Language: German

The Green Devils of Monte Cassino (German: Die grünen Teufel von Monte Cassino) is a 1958 French–German war film directed by Harald Reinl and starring Dieter Eppler, Joachim Fuchsberger, Antje Geerk and Ewald Balser. The film is a fictional love story framed by actual historic events surrounding the Battle of Monte Cassino and the evacuation of its stores of art treasures. The title refers to the nickname of the Fallschirmjäger, the German Luftwaffe's paratroopers.

== Plot summary ==
Summer, 1943. After long and arduous duty at the Eastern Front, the 1st Fallschirmjägerdivision is dropped off by parachute at Avignon for recuperation. Several paratroopers are injured in the jump, including Oberjäger Karl Christiansen, a former infantry Fähnrich who detests the war and was demoted for refusing to execute a captured enemy soldier. At the hospital he meets Inge, a nurse, and the two fall in love. However, Reiter, an Oberleutnant of the division, has taken a fancy to Inge as well.

Right after their arrival, the paratroopers and Inge's hospital corps are reassigned to the Italian front. They receive the order to occupy and secure the area of Monte Cassino, including the nearby town, but not the monastery at the top of the hill, which is meant to shelter the evacuated townspeople and historical art treasures from the surrounding communities. Soon the Allies mount an offensive on their position. Upon learning about the art treasures stored in the abbey, Oberstleutnant Julius Schlegel, about to be sent back home to Austria for heart issues, decides on his own initiative to save the priceless artifacts, and after much arguing convinces the abbot to permit their evacuation to Rome into the custody of the Vatican. However, Allied radio propaganda claims that the Germans are in fact plundering the treasures, and the news quickly spreads among the Cassino townspeople and reaches German high command. Still, despite the threat of a court-martial, Schlegel's division commander officially approves and supports his operation.

In the meantime, Karl and Reiter reunite with Inge, of whose presence they have just learned, which sparks jealously in the Oberleutnant. Additionally, partisan activity has increased against the alleged plundering. The final transport is to commence the following night, with Karl assigned as an escort and Inge going along to procure medical supplies. Planning to intercept the convoy, local resistance member Fausto asks his friend Gina to retrieve a submachine gun from its hiding place in her house, which is occupied by Reiter. Reiter catches her in the act, and in order to avoid suspicion, Gina sleeps with him, but then Reiter finds the gun and forces Gina to confess. Then he and the rest of the division arrive to thwart a resistance attack on the convoy, and Fausto is captured. Reiter orders Karl to execute him, but Karl only pretends to do so, letting Fausto go. In return for this gesture, Fausto stops the resistance from conducting further attacks, and the convoy safely delivers its precious cargo to the Vatican.

In February the next year, a second major Allied attack commences, in whose course the abbey is hit and destroyed by Allied bombs. Most of the civilian survivors - excluding Inge, Gina (forcibly made Reiter's mistress) and several wounded and children - evacuate the ruins, which are then used by the German paratroopers as a fortified position. Gina loses her life in an artillery barrage, and the next night Reiter is killed while on his way to another paratroop battalion. The German defenders are eventually overwhelmed, and Monte Cassino is captured by Allied troops. Karl and Inge both survive the war and, after its conclusion, visit the graves of the fallen at the foot of the fully restored monastery.

== Cast ==
- Dieter Eppler as Karl Christiansen
- Joachim Fuchsberger as Oberleutnant Reiter
- Antje Geerk as Inge
- Ewald Balser as Oberstleutnant Julius Schlegel
- Elma Karlowa as Gina
- Jan Hendriks as Fausto
- Agnès Laurent as Hélène
- Carl Wery as General Heidenreich
- Wolfgang Preiss as Oberstabsarzt Munkler
- Wolfgang Wahl as Greinert
- Wolfgang Neuss as Neumann
- Armin Dahlen as Pater Emmanuel
- Harald Juhnke as Hugo Lembke
- Leonard Steckel as The Abbott
- Albert Hehn as Major Zillert
- Siegfried Breuer Jr.
- Hans von Borsody
- Walter Gross
- Michl Lang
- Wolf Ackva
- Rolf Castell
- Hans Terofal as Friedrich

== Production ==
The film was shot at the Bavaria Studios in Munich. The film's sets were designed by Arne Flekstad and Bruno Monden.

== Bibliography ==
- Bock, Hans-Michael; Bergfelder, Tim, eds. (2009). The Concise Cinegraph: Encyclopaedia of German Cinema. New York: Berghahn Books. ISBN 978-1-57181-655-9.
