= Fanfare of Marriage =

1953 film directed by Hans Grimm

- Directed by: Hans Grimm
- Written by: Felix Lützkendorf; Herbert Witt
- Produced by: Harald Braun; Georg Richter
- Starring: Dieter Borsche; Georg Thomalla; Inge Egger
- Cinematography: Erich Claunigk
- Edited by: Lilian Seng
- Music by: Franz Grothe
- Production company: N.D.F.-Produktion
- Distributed by: Schorcht Filmverleih; Sascha Film (Austria)
- Release date: 3 September 1953
- Running time: 88 minutes
- Country: West Germany
- Language: German

Fanfare of Marriage (German: Fanfaren der Ehe) is a 1953 West German comedy film directed by Hans Grimm and starring Dieter Borsche, Georg Thomalla and Inge Egger. It is the sequel to the 1951 German film Fanfares of Love. It was shot at the Bavaria Studios in Munich and on location around Genoa and Naples in Italy. The film's sets were designed by the art directors Fritz Lück and Hans Sohnle.

== Synopsis ==
While their musician wives are away working on a cruise ship, their husbands are forced to dress up in drag and pretend to be women in order to convince the social services that they are able to look after their children properly.

== Cast ==
- Dieter Borsche as Hans Mertens
- Georg Thomalla as Peter Schmidt
- Inge Egger as Gaby Mertens
- Fita Benkhoff as Daisy van Roy
- Ilse Petri as Sabine Schmidt
- Doris Kirchner as Pat
- Karl Schönböck as Dobler
- Hubert von Meyerinck as Hornisse
- Paul Henckels as Kapitän
- Rudolf Vogel as Wurm
- Margarete Haagen as Schwester Rosmarie
- Liesl Karlstadt as Rebecca
- Lina Carstens as Mrs. Yell
- Bruno Hübner as Arzt

== Bibliography ==
- Terri Ginsberg & Andrea Mensch. A Companion to German Cinema. John Wiley & Sons, 2012.
