= The Unsuspecting Angel =

1936 German film directed by Franz Seitz

- Directed by: Franz Seitz
- Written by: Wolf Neumeister
- Starring: Joe Stöckel; Lucie Englisch; Franz Nicklisch
- Cinematography: Franz Koch
- Edited by: Max Michel
- Music by: Leo Leux
- Production company: Bavaria Film
- Distributed by: Bayerische Film
- Release date: 4 February 1936
- Running time: 85 minutes
- Country: Germany
- Language: German

The Unsuspecting Angel (German: Der ahnungslose Engel) is a 1936 German comedy crime film directed by Franz Seitz and starring Joe Stöckel, Lucie Englisch and Franz Nicklisch. It was shot at the Munich Studios of Bavaria Film and on location in the city. The film's sets were designed by the art director Max Seefelder.

== Cast ==
- Joe Stöckel as Hörl, Grenzoberaufseher
- Lucie Englisch as Jozi
- Franz Nicklisch as Hans Markwart, Grenzaufseher
- Erika Glässner as Frau Bergmann, Wirtin vom Hirschenstand
- Otto Fassler as Stefan Meser
- Josef Eichheim as Onkelchen
- Erna Fentsch as Manja
- Jola Jobst as Steffi
- O. E. Hasse as Kornitzki
- Arnulf Schröder as Babitz
- Elisabeth Flickenschildt as Lotte Grün
- Richard Häussler
- Ludwig Schmitz
- Justus Paris as Heuer
- Herta Schwarz as Paula
- Liane Kopf as Frau Guggemoos
- Michl Lang as Loidl
- Ludwig Ten Cloot
- Thea Aichbichler
- Franz Kronach
- Erika Stauffenberg
- Lydia Schulenburg

== Bibliography ==
- Bock, Hans-Michael & Bergfelder, Tim. The Concise CineGraph. Encyclopedia of German Cinema. Berghahn Books, 2009.
