= The Ambassador's Wife (film) =

1955 film

- Directed by: Hans Deppe
- Written by: Rolf Dortenwald; Axel Eggebrecht; Ilse Lotz-Dupont
- Produced by: Wilhelm Gernhardt; Hans Deppe
- Starring: Paul Hubschmid; Ingrid Andree; Antje Weisgerber
- Cinematography: Fritz Arno Wagner
- Edited by: Johanna Meisel
- Music by: Werner Eisbrenner
- Production company: Constantin Film
- Distributed by: Constantin Film
- Release date: 4 August 1955
- Running time: 94 minutes
- Country: West Germany
- Language: German

The Ambassador's Wife (German: Die Frau des Botschafters) is a 1955 West German spy drama film directed by Hans Deppe and starring Paul Hubschmid, Ingrid Andree and Antje Weisgerber. It was shot at the Spandau Studios in West Berlin and on location around Lisbon. The film's sets were designed by the art directors Willi Herrmann and Heinrich Weidemann.

== Synopsis ==
The translator Sybille marries the Scandinavian diplomat Christian Lundvall and accompanies him on his new posting as ambassador to Portugal. However once there she is blackmailed by John, an agent of a foreign power, into stealing secret documents from her husband's safe.

== Cast ==
- Paul Hubschmid as John de la Croix
- Ingrid Andree as Andrea Lundvall
- Antje Weisgerber as Subylle Costa
- Hans Stüwe as Christian Lundvall
- Laya Raki as Manuela
- Charles Regnier as Mattusch
- Hans Quest as Holmgreen
- Kurt Vespermann as Nilsson
- Alice Treff as Charlotte Hendrik
- Herbert Hübner as Paul de la Croix
- Sandra Mammis as Juana
- Hans Deppe
- Wolf Harnisch

== Bibliography ==
- Parish, James Robert. Film Actors Guide. Scarecrow Press, 1977.
