= Arnulf Schröder =

German actor (1903–1960)

Arnulf Schröder (born Munich, June 13, 1903 - died there, December 22, 1960) was a German actor and director. He studied at the Oberrealschule with Claire Bauroff. He spent some of his career working in the cabarets of Berlin.

== Selected filmography ==
- The Unsuspecting Angel (1936)
- Meiseken (1937)
- Red Orchids (1938)
- Water for Canitoga (1939)
- Enemies (1940)
- The Dark Day (1943)
- Chased by the Devil (1950)
- Immortal Light (1951)
- Arlette Conquers Paris (1953)
- The Missing Miniature (1954)
- Royal Hunt in Ischl (1955)
- San Salvatore (1956)
- Taiga (1958)
- An American in Salzburg (1958)
- The Domestic Tyrant (1959)
- Oh! This Bavaria! (1960)
