= Monika Dahlberg =

German actress (born 1936)

- Born: 30 April 1936 (age 90); Pomerania, Germany
- Other name: Rosemarie Rödelberger
- Occupations: Actress, singer
- Years active: 1957– (film)

Monika Dahlberg (born 30 April 1936) is a German singer, and film and television actress.

She studied in Kiel as an actress and opera singer. In 1957 she signed a three-year contract with Constantin Film, and featured in several comedies and heimatfilm. From the 1960s onwards she increasingly appeared on television as well. Dahlberg also worked as a voice actress, dubbing foreign films for release in German market.

Her brother Wolfgang Rödelberger was a composer. She was married to the actor Klaus Kindler.

== Selected filmography ==
- Greetings and Kisses from Tegernsee (1957)
- The Csardas King (1958)
- My Sweetheart Is from Tyrol (1958)
- I'll Carry You in My Arms (1958)
- Mandolins and Moonlight (1959)
- The Scarlet Baroness (1959)
- Isola Bella (1961)
- What Is Father Doing in Italy? (1961)
- I Must Go to the City (1962)
- Onkel Filser – Allerneueste Lausbubengeschichten (1966)
- I Am Looking for a Man (1966)
- Zur Hölle mit den Paukern (1968)
- We'll Take Care of the Teachers (1970)
- Morgen fällt die Schule aus (1971)
- Der Edelweißkönig (1975)

== Bibliography ==
- Paietta, Ann C. (2007). Teachers in the Movies: A Filmography of Depictions of Grade School, Preschool and Day Care Educators, 1890s to the Present. Jefferson, NC: McFarland. ISBN 978-0-7864-2938-7.
