= Like Once Lili Marleen =

1956 film

- Directed by: Paul Verhoeven
- Written by: Werner Hill; Ilse Lotz-Dupont; Kiope Raymond; Paul Verhoeven
- Produced by: Bernhard F. Schmidt
- Starring: Adrian Hoven; Marianne Hold; Claus Holm
- Cinematography: Karl Schröder
- Edited by: Ilse Voigt
- Music by: Norbert Schultze
- Production company: Delos Film
- Distributed by: Constantin Film
- Release date: 21 September 1956
- Running time: 90 minutes
- Country: West Germany
- Language: German

Like Once Lili Marleen (German: ...wie einst Lili Marleen) is a 1956 West German romantic drama film directed by Paul Verhoeven and starring Adrian Hoven, Marianne Hold and Claus Holm. The title refers to the popular wartime song "Lili Marleen" popularised by Lale Anderson, who performs it at a concert at the end of the film.

It was shot at the Spandau Studios in West Berlin. The film's sets were designed by the art directors Albrecht Hennings and Karl Weber.

== Synopsis ==
Violinmaker Franz Brugger is in love with Christa. When he is conscripted during the Second World War she promises to wait for him. He fights on the Eastern Front for four years and then is held as a prisoner of war by the Soviets for a further ten. All along he is kept going by the song "Lili Marlene" and the thought of Christa. When at last he is released, he returns home to Berlin and finds the world significantly changed from that which he remembers. Worse, Christa is engaged to be married to another man. He sets out to win her back.

== Cast ==
- Adrian Hoven as Franz Brugger
- Marianne Hold as Christa Schmidt
- Claus Holm as Oberarzt Dr. Robert Berger
- Hannelore Schroth as Klärchen Müller
- Peter Carsten as Toni Knoll
- Käthe Haack as Frau Schmidt
- Wolfgang Preiss a Alfred Linder
- Lucie Englisch as Minna Lauck
- Roma Bahn as Fräulein Korn
- Kurt Vespermann as Portier Krause
- Gudrun Schmidt as Schwester, Lene
- Ralf Wolter as Deutscher Soldat
- Hildegard Grethe as Frau Berger
- Else Ehser as Aufwartefrau
- Lale Andersen as Singer 'Lili Marleen' - 'Südseenacht'

== Bibliography ==
- Lehrke, Gisela. Wie einst Lili Marleen: das Leben der Lale Andersen. Henschel, 2002.
