= Doctor Solm =

1955 film

- Directed by: Paul May
- Written by: Harald Baumgarten (novel); Kurt Heuser; Ilse Lotz-Dupont
- Produced by: Paul May; Bernhard F. Schmidt
- Starring: Hans Söhnker; Sybil Werden; Antje Weisgerber
- Cinematography: Hans Schneeberger
- Edited by: Heinz Haber
- Music by: Norbert Schultze
- Production company: Delos-Film
- Distributed by: Constantin Film
- Release date: 17 March 1955
- Running time: 98 minutes
- Country: West Germany
- Language: German

Doctor Solm (German: Oberarzt Dr. Solm) is a 1955 West German drama film directed by Paul May and starring Hans Söhnker, Sybil Werden and Antje Weisgerber.

The film's sets were designed by the art director Mathias Matthies and Karl Vollbrecht. It was filmed at the Spandau Studios in Berlin with location shooting around Kitzbühel in Austria.

== Cast ==
- Hans Söhnker as Oberarzt Dr. Karl Solm
- Sybil Werden as Angelika Berding, Tochter
- Antje Weisgerber as Schwester Regine
- Ilse Steppat as Claudia Möllenhauer, Tochter
- Anna Dammann as Elisabeth Berding
- Hans Clarin as Benvenuto Berding, Sohn
- Harald Juhnke as Konrad, Solms Stiefbruder
- Walther Süssenguth as Prof. Berding, Psychiater
- Wolfgang Preiss as Dr. Hartung
- Sepp Rist as Bauer Dinkelsbacher
- Carla Rust as Sophie, seine Frau
- Kurt Vespermann
- Hans Caninenberg as Peter Lauritz
- Karola Ebeling as Evchen, Solms Stiefschwester
- Peter Fischer as Xaver
- Heinrich Gretler as Dr. Leopold
- Fritz Hinz-Fabricius as Prof. Möllenhauer
- Franziska Kinz as Oberschwester Innocenzia
- Stanislav Ledinek
- Alexa von Porembsky as Schwester Franziska

== Bibliography ==
- Bock, Hans-Michael & Bergfelder, Tim. The Concise CineGraph. Encyclopedia of German Cinema. Berghahn Books, 2009.
