= Waldrausch (1962 film) =

- Directed by: Paul May
- Based on: Waldrausch by Ludwig Ganghofer
- Starring: Marianne Hold, Gerhard Riedmann and Ingeborg Schöner
- Music by: Johannes Fehring
- Production company: Sascha-Film
- Release date: 1962
- Running time: 1h 29m
- Country: Austria
- Language: German

Waldrausch is a 1962 Austrian drama film directed by Paul May and starring Marianne Hold, Gerhard Riedmann and Ingeborg Schöner. It is based on the novel Waldrausch by Ludwig Ganghofer. Another film adaptation was made in 1977.

== Plot ==
An architect proposes a plan to build a dam, flooding a valley.

== Cast ==
- Marianne Hold ... Beda
- Gerhard Riedmann ... Ambros Lutz
- Ingeborg Schöner ... Annette von Larenburg
- Sieghardt Rupp ... Crispin Sagenbacher
- Paul Hartmann ... Der alte Stuiber
- Peter Toifl ... Der kleine Toni
- Adrienne Gessner ... Die Zieblingen
- Alexander Trojan ... Boris von Larenburg
- Sepp Rist ... Der Mann von Kaprun
- Edd Stavjanik ... Diener Kesselschmidt
- Hans Habietinek ... Regierungsrat
- Raoul Retzer ... Der Lange
- Walter Regelsberger ... Ein Fahrer
- Herbert Fux ... Bauführer Seidl
- Walter Lehr ... Peter Stich
