= Success (1991 film) =

1991 film

- Directed by: Franz Seitz Jr.
- Written by: Franz Seitz Jr.; Lion Feuchtwanger (novel)
- Produced by: Ferdinand Althoff; Franz Seitz Jr.
- Starring: Bruno Ganz
- Cinematography: Rudolf Blahacek
- Edited by: Gisela Haller
- Release date: 28 February 1991
- Running time: 265 minutes
- Country: Germany
- Language: German

Success (German: Erfolg) is a 1991 German drama film based on the eponymous novel by Lion Feuchtwanger. It was entered into the 41st Berlin International Film Festival.

== Cast ==
- Bruno Ganz as Jacques Tüverlin
- Franziska Walser as Johanna Krain
- Peter Simonischek as Dr. Martin Krüger
- Mathieu Carrière as Erich Bornhaak
- Gudrun Gabriel as Anna Elisabeth Haider
- Manfred Zapatka as Kaspar Pröckl
- Thomas Holtzmann as Dr. Franz Flaucher
- Jutta Speidel as Katharina von Radolny
- Gerd Anthoff as Paul Hessreither
- Günter Mack as Förtsch
- Dietrich Mattausch as Dr. Hartl, Amtsgerichtspräsident
- Bernhard Wicki as Bichler
- Ernst Jacobi as Dr. Siegbert Geier
- Martin Benrath as Dr. Otto Klenk
- Gustl Bayrhammer as Vorsitzender Disziplinarausschuß
