= My Sweetheart Is from Tyrol =

1958 film

- Directed by: Hans Quest
- Written by: Karl Heinz Busse; Carlo Fedier
- Produced by: Franz Seitz
- Starring: Marianne Hold; Joachim Fuchsberger; Walter Gross
- Cinematography: Heinz Schnackertz
- Edited by: Ingeborg Taschner
- Music by: Werner Scharfenberger
- Production company: Franz Seitz Filmproduktion
- Distributed by: Constantin Film
- Release date: 19 December 1958
- Running time: 89 minutes
- Country: West Germany
- Language: German

My Sweetheart Is from Tyrol (German: Mein Schatz ist aus Tirol) is a 1958 West German musical romantic comedy film directed by Hans Quest and starring Marianne Hold, Joachim Fuchsberger and Walter Gross. The film was made in Eastmancolor and was part of the popular postwar group of heimatfilm. It was shot at the Bavaria Studios in Munich and on location around Schliersee and in the South Tyrol including Merano. The film's sets were designed by the art director Arne Flekstad.

== Cast ==
- Marianne Hold as Eva Ferner
- Joachim Fuchsberger as Peter Weigand
- Walter Gross as Gustav Mummelmann
- Monika Dahlberg as Marion-Madeleine
- Beppo Brem as Johann
- Siegfried Breuer Jr. as Franz
- Johanna König as Mariele
- Alice Kessler as Li
- Ellen Kessler as Lo
- Lolita as Singer
- Jimmy Makulis as Singer
- Hans Fitz as Großvater Perner
- Paul Westermeier as Emil Metzger, gen. Boucher
- Theodor Danegger as Alter Baron
- Rolf Pinegger as Loisl Perner, Evas kleiner Bruder
- Gabriele Clonisch-Maio as Sängerin
- Blaue Jungs as Themselves
- Die Geschwister Fahrnberger as Sängerinnen
- Helga Sommerfeld as Girl with accordion

== Bibliography ==
- Trimborn, Jürgen. Der deutsche Heimatfilm der fünfziger Jahre: Motive, Symbole und Handlungsmuster. Teiresias, 1998.
- Von Moltke, Johannes. No Place Like Home: Locations Of Heimat In German Cinema. University of California Press, 2005.
