= The Scarlet Baroness =

1959 film directed by Rudolf Jugert

- Directed by: Rudolf Jugert
- Written by: J. Joachim Bartsch
- Produced by: Franz Seitz
- Starring: Dawn Addams; Joachim Fuchsberger; Wera Frydtberg
- Cinematography: Heinz Schnackertz
- Edited by: Ingeborg Taschner
- Music by: Rolf A. Wilhelm
- Production company: Franz Seitz Filmproduktion
- Distributed by: Transocean-Film
- Release date: 20 February 1959
- Running time: 99 minutes
- Country: West Germany
- Language: German

The Scarlet Baroness (German: Die feuerrote Baronesse) is a 1959 West German spy thriller film directed by Rudolf Jugert and starring Dawn Addams, Joachim Fuchsberger and Wera Frydtberg.

The film's sets were designed by the art director Arne Flekstad. It was shot at the Arca-Filmstudio in Berlin.

== Synopsis ==
During the final days of the Second World War, British intelligence sends an agent to Berlin to try to discover the secrets of Nazi Germany's nuclear weapons program.

== Cast ==
- Dawn Addams as Szaga de Bor - the red-haired spy
- Joachim Fuchsberger as Tailor
- Wera Frydtberg as Juliane
- Paul Dahlke as Oberst Urbaneck
- Hans Nielsen as Professor Reimer
- Albert Hehn as Leutnant
- Werner Peters
- Monika Dahlberg
- Paul Albert Krumm
- Otto Wernicke
- Angèle Durand
- Paul Bösiger
- Willi Rose
- Ilse Fürstenberg
- Edelweiß Malchin
- Edgar Wenzel
- Egon Vogel
- Hans W. Hamacher
- Wolfgang Gruner

== Bibliography ==
- Craig, Rob. American International Pictures: A Comprehensive Filmography. McFarland, 2019.
