= Ilse Lotz-Dupont =

German screenwriter

- Born: 3 October 1898; Berlin, German Empire
- Died: 1 June 1968 (aged 69); Munich, West Germany
- Occupations: Playwright, Screenwriter, actress
- Years active: 1953-1965 (Film)

Ilse Lotz-Dupont (1898–1968) was a German playwright and screenwriter. She was active in the cinema of West Germany during the 1950s and 1960s.

== Selected filmography ==
- Heartbroken on the Moselle (1953)
- Conchita and the Engineer (1954)
- The Beautiful Miller (1954)
- The Ambassador's Wife (1955)
- The Priest from Kirchfeld (1955)
- When the Alpine Roses Bloom (1955)
- Doctor Solm (1955)
- Like Once Lili Marleen (1956)
- Almenrausch and Edelweiss (1957)
- Scampolo (1958)
- Kleine Leute mal ganz groß (1958)
- At Blonde Kathrein's Place (1959)
- Mein Schatz komm mit ans blaue Meer (1959)
- Do Not Send Your Wife to Italy (1960)
- Satan Tempts with Love (1960)
- Isola Bella (1961)
- What Is Father Doing in Italy? (1961)
- The Sold Grandfather (1962)
- The Swedish Girl (1965)
- When the Grapevines Bloom on the Danube (1965)

== Bibliography ==
- Bono,Francesco & Roschlau, Johannes (ed.) Ein Cinegraph Buch - Tenöre, Touristen, Gastarbeiter: Deutsch-italienische Filmbeziehungen. Edition text + kritik, 2013.
