= Fanfares of Love =

1951 film

- Directed by: Kurt Hoffmann
- Written by: Michael Logan; Heinz Pauck; Robert Thoeren
- Produced by: Harald Braun
- Starring: Dieter Borsche; Georg Thomalla; Inge Egger
- Cinematography: Richard Angst
- Edited by: Claus von Boro
- Music by: Franz Grothe
- Production company: Neue Deutsche Filmgesellschaft
- Distributed by: Schorcht Filmverleih
- Release date: 14 September 1951
- Running time: 91 minutes
- Country: West Germany
- Language: German

Fanfares of Love (German: Fanfaren der Liebe) is a 1951 West German comedy film directed by Kurt Hoffmann, starring Dieter Borsche, Georg Thomalla and Inge Egger. It is a remake of the 1935 French film Fanfare of Love. It was a major hit and in 1953 a sequel Fanfare of Marriage was released, showing the further adventures of the main characters.

== Production ==
The story was based on a screenplay written by Robert Thoeren while working in the Weimar Republic in the early 1930s. After emigrating to Paris following the Nazi takeover of power, it was developed into a French film directed by Richard Pottier.

It was shot at the Bavaria Studios in Munich with sets designed by the art director Franz Bi. Location filming also took place at Berchtesgaden in the Bavarian Alps.

== Hollywood remake ==
The film was remade in Hollywood in 1959 by Billy Wilder as Some Like It Hot. Thoeren screened the 1951 German film for Wilder, who secured the remake rights. In contrast to the contemporary setting of the German film, Wilder shifted the action back to the 1920s. He later tried to downplay the extent to which he was influenced by the original, describing it as "a very low budget, very third-class German picture".

In the German dubbing of Some Like It Hot, Georg Thomalla served as the voice for Jack Lemmon in his role as the second musician - exactly the role which Thomalla played eight years earlier in this film.

== Synopsis ==
Two struggling male musicians, unable to get any work, dress as women in order to get work in an all-female band.

== Cast ==
- Dieter Borsche as Hans Mertens
- Georg Thomalla as Peter
- Inge Egger as Gaby Bruck
- Grethe Weiser as Lydia d'Estée
- Oskar Sima as Hallinger
- Ilse Petri as Sabine
- Beppo Brem as Boxer
- Hans Fitz as Friedrich
- Ursula Traun as Anette
- Viktor Afritsch as Friseur
- Herbert Kroll as Poehle
- Michl Lang as Hotelportier Brunhuber
- Walther Kiaulehn as Oberkellner

== Bibliography ==
- Terri Ginsberg & Andrea Mensch. A Companion to German Cinema. John Wiley & Sons, 2012.
