= At Blonde Kathrein's Place =

1959 West German romantic comedy film

- Directed by: Hans Quest
- Written by: Ilse Lotz-Dupont
- Produced by: Franz Seitz
- Starring: Marianne Hold; Gerhard Riedmann; Harald Juhnke
- Cinematography: Heinz Schnackertz
- Edited by: Ingeborg Taschner
- Music by: Gert Wilden
- Production company: Carlton-Film
- Distributed by: Union-Film
- Release date: 26 November 1959
- Running time: 88 minutes
- Country: West Germany
- Language: German

At Blonde Kathrein's Place (German: Bei der blonden Kathrein) is a 1959 West German romantic comedy film directed by Hans Quest and starring Marianne Hold, Gerhard Riedmann and Harald Juhnke. The film is a remake of the 1934 film of the same title. Part of the popular tradition of heimatfilm, it was shot in Agfacolor at the Carlton Studios in Munich. Location shooting took place around Meersburg on Lake Constance. The film's sets were designed by the art directors Wolf Englert and Bruno Monden.

== Cast ==
- Marianne Hold as Kathrein Buchner
- Gerhard Riedmann as Clemens Hagen
- Harald Juhnke as Weyrauch
- Hans Nielsen as Der baron
- Angelika Meissner as Micky
- Michl Lang as Apfelbaum
- Christiane Jansen as Evelyn
- Traute Rose as Frau Eisenreich
- Beppo Brem as Tankwart
- Oliver Hassencamp as Anton Eisenreich
- Ernst Reinhold as Kurt
- Willy Schultes as Portier
- Hans Fitz
- Bingi von Jakubowski
- Monika Greving
- Franz Loskarn

== Bibliography ==
- Amador, María Luisa & Blanco, Jorge Ayala Cartelera cinematográfica, 1960-1969. Centro Universitario de Estudios Cinematográficos, 1986.
- Frank, Stefanie Mathilde. Wiedersehen im Wirtschaftswunder: Remakes von Filmen aus der Zeit des Nationalsozialismus in der Bundesrepublik 1949–1963. V&R Unipress, 2017.
