= Käthe Itter =

German actress (1907–1992)

- Born: 2 June 1907; Spandau, German Empire
- Died: 30 June 1992 (aged 85) (Germany)
- Occupation: Actress
- Years active: 1936–1968 (film & TV)

Käthe Itter (1907–1992) was a German film, television and stage actress.

== Filmography ==
Year	Title	Role	Notes
1936	There Were Two Bachelors	Charlotte - dessen Tochter	
1952	That Can Happen to Anyone		
1952	Once on the Rhine	Wwe. Lisa Kuchenheim	
1953	Scandal at the Girls' School	Frl. Schön	
1953	Salto Mortale	Martha	
1954	The Country Schoolmaster	Beate, seine Frau	
1954	The Beautiful Miller	Lina	
1956	A Thousand Melodies	Elisabeth Lauterbach	
1956	As Long as the Roses Bloom	Schwester Erika	
1957	Beneath the Palms on the Blue Sea		
1957	The Devil Strikes at Night	Portiersfrau	
1958	A Song Goes Round the World		
1959	The Ideal Woman	Anna	Uncredited
1959	Ein Sommer, den man nie vergißt		
1961	Im sechsten Stock		
1963	Bekenntnisse eines möblierten Herrn	Mutter Zierholt	
1965	Praetorius	Oberschwester	

== Bibliography ==
- Greco, Joseph. The File on Robert Siodmak in Hollywood, 1941–1951. Universal-Publishers, 1999.
