= Women's Regiment =

1936 film

- Directed by: Karl Ritter
- Written by: Hans Fitz; Rudo Ritter
- Produced by: Karl Ritter
- Starring: Heli Finkenzeller; Erika von Thellmann; Oskar Sima
- Cinematography: Konstantin Irmen-Tschet
- Edited by: Gottfried Ritter
- Music by: Ernst Erich Buder
- Production company: UFA
- Distributed by: UFA
- Release date: 10 July 1936
- Running time: 90 minutes
- Country: Germany
- Language: German

Women's Regiment (German: Weiberregiment) is a 1936 German comedy film directed by Karl Ritter and starring Heli Finkenzeller, Erika von Thellmann and Oskar Sima. It was shot at the Babelsberg Studios in Potsdam and on location around Bischofswiesen and Berchtesgaden. The film's sets were designed by the art directors Franz Koehn and Max Mellin.

== Synopsis ==
In the Bavarian Alps the attractive young Rosl is the heir to the Zacherlbräu brewery, but finds a hostile reception from the male workforce. Even Alois the brewmaster who is in love with Rosl thinks she does not belong working there. However the intervention of her aunt Cilli leads to a dramatic shift, all the male workers are fired and replace by females. The men chafe against this new "Monstruous Regiment of women". Cilli who seeks to retain control of the farm, sends for her brother Ignaz so that he can marry Rosl and keep the management in their hands. This scheme is uncovered and Alois returns.

== Cast ==
- Heli Finkenzeller as Rosl
- Erika von Thellmann as Cilli Samhaber
- Oskar Sima as Ignaz
- Hermann Erhardt as Alois, Bräumeister
- Beppo Brem as Seppl, Koch
- Erna Fentsch as Vroni, Magd
- Hella Graf as Theres, Magd
- Ursula Junghann as Gusti, Magd
- Lieselott Klingler as Annamirl, Magd
- Luise Löhr as Mari, Magd
- Theodolinde Müller as Urschi, Magd
- Herma Relin as Zenzi, Magd
- Franz Loskarn as Beni, Knecht
- Herbert Spalke as Pankraz, Knecht
- Hans Schneider as Wastl, Knecht
- Fritz Bölke as Lampert, Knecht
- Theodor Danegger as Korbinian, Faktotum

== Bibliography ==
- Bock, Hans-Michael & Bergfelder, Tim. The Concise CineGraph. Encyclopedia of German Cinema. Berghahn Books, 2009.
- Waldman, Harry. Nazi Films In America, 1933-1942. McFarland & Co, 2008.
- Weinstein, Valerie. Antisemitism in Film Comedy in Nazi Germany. Indiana University Press, 2019.
