= Beneath the Palms on the Blue Sea =

1957 film

- Directed by: Hans Deppe
- Written by: Kurt E. Walter
- Produced by: Johannes J. Frank; Wilhelm Gernhardt
- Starring: Bibi Johns; Giulia Rubini; Harald Juhnke
- Cinematography: Werner M. Lenz
- Edited by: Johanna Meisel
- Music by: Heino Gaze
- Production company: Hans Deppe Film
- Distributed by: Neue Filmverleih
- Release date: 16 July 1957
- Running time: 90 minutes
- Countries: Italy; West Germany
- Language: German

Beneath the Palms on the Blue Sea (German: Unter Palmen am blauen Meer, Italian: Vacanze a Portofino) is a 1957 German-Italian musical film directed by Hans Deppe and starring Bibi Johns, Giulia Rubini and Harald Juhnke.

== Cast ==
- Bibi Johns as Kitty Bruhns
- Giulia Rubini as Marina Morini
- Harald Juhnke as Freddy Glass
- Teddy Reno as himself, Singer
- Horst Uhse as Horst Rasemann
- Lil Dagover as Contessa Celestina Morini
- Charles Regnier as Cesare, the Contessa's butler
- Helmut Zacharias as himself
- Käthe Itter
- Attilio Torelli
- Tonino Cianci
- Peter Cornehlsen as Peter
- Michael Lengauer
- Horst Kraft

== Bibliography ==
- Hans-Michael Bock and Tim Bergfelder. The Concise Cinegraph: An Encyclopedia of German Cinema. Berghahn Books, 2009.
