= The Swedish Girl =

1965 film

- Directed by: Kurt Wilhelm
- Written by: Ilse Lotz-Dupont; Franz Seitz
- Produced by: Franz Seitz
- Starring: Paul Hubschmid; Letícia Román; Thomas Fritsch
- Cinematography: Heinz Pehlke; Heinz Schnackertz
- Edited by: Jane Seitz
- Music by: Rolf A. Wilhelm
- Production company: Thalia-Filmproduktion
- Distributed by: Nora Film
- Release date: 4 June 1965
- Running time: 90 minutes
- Country: West Germany
- Language: German

The Swedish Girl (German: Die schwedische Jungfrau) is a 1965 West German comedy film directed by Kurt Wilhelm and starring Paul Hubschmid, Letícia Román and Thomas Fritsch. The film's sets were designed by the art directors Walter Haag and Max Mellin.

== Synopsis ==
Swedish student Siri Malmgreen arrives in Munich and falls in love with the professor of zoology Martin Wiegand. She sets out to win him over, but her seductive attempts keep failing. She discovers that he is in a relationship with the publisher Margaret and tries to break them up. To make Martin jealous, she also employs a young man Philipp to pose as her own fake boyfriend.

== Cast ==
- Paul Hubschmid as Prof. Dr. Martin Wiegand
- Letícia Román as Siri Malmgren
- Thomas Fritsch as Philipp Münzinger
- Gerlinde Locker as Barbara
- Margot Trooger as Margret Brinkmann
- Friedrich von Thun as Anton Treuberg
- Erika von Thellmann as Clotilde
- Walter Buschhoff as Georg
- Michl Lang as Apotheker
- Dieter Borsche as Crusenberg

== Bibliography ==
- Bock, Hans-Michael & Bergfelder, Tim. The Concise CineGraph. Encyclopedia of German Cinema. Berghahn Books, 2009.
