= Leute wie du und ich =

- Starring: Harald Juhnke
- Country of origin: Germany
- No. of episodes: 7

Original release
- Release: 3 February 1980

Leute wie du und ich is a German television series.

== See also ==
- List of German television series
