= Do Not Send Your Wife to Italy =

1960 film

- Directed by: Hans Grimm
- Written by: Ilse Lotz-Dupont
- Produced by: Franz Seitz
- Starring: Marianne Hold; Claus Biederstaedt; Elma Karlowa
- Cinematography: Heinz Schnackertz
- Edited by: Herbert Taschner
- Music by: Rolf A. Wilhelm; Larici
- Production company: Franz Seitz Filmproduktion
- Distributed by: Constantin Film
- Release date: 22 September 1960
- Running time: 101 minutes
- Country: West Germany
- Language: German

Do Not Send Your Wife to Italy (German: Schick Deine Frau nicht nach Italien) is a 1960 West German romantic comedy film directed by Hans Grimm and starring Marianne Hold, Claus Biederstaedt, Elma Karlowa and Tony Sandler in the role of Paolo Costa.

It was shot at the Bavaria Studios in Munich. The film's art direction was by Max Mellin.

== Main cast ==
- Marianne Hold as Dr. Sabine Reimer
- Claus Biederstaedt as Robert Kiel
- Elma Karlowa as Manuela Beetz
- Harald Juhnke as Karl Beetz
- Gerlinde Locker as Lizzie Kiel
- Horst Naumann as Dr. Martin Wiebold
- Franco Andrei as Francesco Brunelli
- Tony Sandler as Paolo Costa
- Liesl Karlstadt as Tete
- Oliver Grimm as Jokki Beetz

== Bibliography ==
- Schrader, Sabine; Winkler, Daniel, eds. (2014). The Cinemas of Italian Migration: European and Transatlantic Narratives. Newcastle: Cambridge Scholars Publishing. ISBN 978-1-4438-6994-2.
