= The Country Schoolmaster (1954 film) =

1954 film

- Directed by: Hans Deppe
- Written by: Felicitas Rose (novel); Kurt E. Walter; Peter Francke
- Produced by: Wilhelm Gernhardt
- Starring: Barbara Rütting; Claus Holm; Herbert Hübner
- Cinematography: Karl Löb; Fritz Arno Wagner
- Edited by: Hanna Meisel
- Music by: Heinrich Riethmüller
- Production company: Hans Deppe Film
- Distributed by: Neue Filmverleih
- Release date: 11 January 1954
- Running time: 96 minutes
- Country: West Germany
- Language: German

The Country Schoolmaster (German: Heideschulmeister Uwe Karsten) is a 1954 West German drama film directed by Hans Deppe and starring Barbara Rütting, Claus Holm and Herbert Hübner. It is a remake of the 1933 film of the same title. It is sometimes known by the alternative title Eternal Love.

It was shot at the Bendestorf Studios and on location in Hamburg and Lüneburg Heath. The film's art direction was by Willi Herrmann and Heinrich Weidemann.

== Cast ==
- Barbara Rütting as Ursula Diewen
- Claus Holm as Uwe Karsten Alslev
- Herbert Hübner as Ernst Diewen, Ursulas Vater
- Carola Höhn as Sabine, seine Frau
- Hans Quest as Ludwig, Ursulas Bruder
- Wolfgang Lukschy as Heinrich Heinsius
- Katharina Mayberg as Martha Detleffsen
- Carsta Löck as Minna, Mädchen bei Diewen
- Franz Schafheitlin as Senator Vanlos
- Günther Lüders as Pastor Sunneby
- Käthe Itter as Beate, seine Frau
- Lotte Brackebusch as Uwes Mutter
- Josef Sieber as Jan
- Heidi Brühl as Sternchen
- Claus-Dieter Schmoller as Hänschen
- Käthe Haack as Tante Renate
- Richard Drosten

== Bibliography ==
- Williams, Alan. Film and Nationalism. Rutgers University Press, 2002.
