= Claus Holm =

German actor

- Born: 4 August 1918; Bochum, Germany
- Died: 21 September 1996 (aged 78); Berlin, Germany
- Occupation: Actor
- Years active: 1943–1979

Claus Holm (4 August 1918 – 21 September 1996) was a German film actor. He appeared in 50 films between 1943 and 1979. He was born in Bochum, Germany and died in Berlin, Germany.

== Selected filmography ==
- A Flea in Her Ear (1943) - Knecht Hannes
- The Bath in the Barn (1943) - Pieter, Müllersohn
- Raid (1947) - Karl Lorenz, Kriminal-Anwärter
- Marriage in the Shadows (1947) - Dr. Herbert Blohm
- The Morgenrot Mine (1948) - Ernst Rothkegel
- Quartet of Five (1949) - Martin Bergau
- The Merry Wives of Windsor (1950) - Herr Fluth (Ford)
- The Axe of Wandsbek (1951) - SA-Sturmführer Trowe
- Zugverkehr unregelmäßig (1951) - Jochen Böhling
- Sein großer Sieg (1952) - Hans Netterman
- The Country Schoolmaster (1954) - Uwe Karsten Alslev
- Captain Wronski (1954) - Dornbusch
- The Plot to Assassinate Hitler (1955) - Oberleutnant H.
- The Priest from Kirchfeld (1955) - Vinzenz Heller, Pfarrer von Kirchfeld
- When the Alpine Roses Bloom (1955) - Franzl
- Two Blue Eyes (1955) - Dr. Michael Arndt
- Fruit Without Love (1956) - Georg Kling
- Winter in the Woods (1956) - Martin
- Der Glockengießer von Tirol (1956) - Georg, Geselle
- Like Once Lili Marleen (1956) - Oberarzt Dr. Robert Berger
- Der Adler vom Velsatal (1957) - Toni Erlbacher
- Flucht in die Tropennacht (1957) - Peter
- The Devil Strikes at Night (1957) - Kriminalkommissar Axel Kersten
- Für zwei Groschen Zärtlichkeit (1957) - Hendrik Pedersen
- Die Lindenwirtin vom Donaustrand (1957) - Fred
- Girls of the Night (1958) - Le père Hermann
- Bimbo the Great (1958) - Alexander 'Bimbo' Peters genannt Ras Tagore
- The Girl from the Marsh Croft (1958) - Gudmund Erlandsson
- The Tiger of Eschnapur (1959) - Dr. Walter Rhode
- The Indian Tomb (1959) - Dr. Walter Rhode
- Im Namen einer Mutter (1960) - Dr. Felix Sperber
- Blind Justice (1961) - Dr. Werner Rüttgen
- Aurora Marriage Bureau (1962) - Arnold Lewandowski
- The Curse of the Yellow Snake (1963) - Inspektor Frazer
- Among Vultures (1964) - 'Reverend' Weller (voice, uncredited)
- Is Paris Burning? (1966) - Huhm (uncredited)
- Raumpatrouille Orion (1966, TV Series) - Hasso Sigbjörnson
- Die Nibelungen (1966) - Gernot (voice, uncredited)
- Die Nibelungen, Teil 2 - Kriemhilds Rache (1967) - Gernot (voice, uncredited)
- The College Girl Murders (1967) - Glenn Powers
- Death and Diamonds (1968) - Butt Lancaster
- Sin with a Discount (1968) - Weber
- The Gorilla of Soho (1968) - Dr. Jeckyll
- Game of Losers (1978) - Georg Friedrichs
- The Marriage of Maria Braun (1979) - Doctor
- The Third Generation (1979) - Opa Gast
- Berlin Alexanderplatz (1980, TV Mini-Series) - Wirt / Gastwirt Max
