= When the Alpine Roses Bloom =

1955 film

- Directed by: Hans Deppe; Richard Häussler
- Written by: Ilse Lotz-Dupont; Tibor Yost; Friedrich von Rüdt
- Produced by: Hans Deppe; Wilhelm Gernhardt
- Starring: Hertha Feiler; Claus Holm; Marianne Hold
- Cinematography: Willy Winterstein
- Edited by: Johanna Meisel
- Music by: Willy Mattes
- Production company: Hans Deppe Film
- Distributed by: Constantin Film
- Release date: 22 September 1955
- Running time: 95 minutes
- Country: West Germany
- Language: German

When the Alpine Roses Bloom (German: Wenn die Alpenrosen blüh'n) is a 1955 West German drama film directed by Richard Häussler and Hans Deppe and starring Hertha Feiler, Claus Holm, and Marianne Hold. Along with As Long as the Roses Bloom, it was one of two follow-ups directed by Deppe to his hit 1953 heimatfilm When the White Lilacs Bloom Again.

It was shot at the Spandau Studios in Berlin and on location in the Austrian state of Tyrol. The film's sets were designed by the art director Heinrich Weidemann.

== Cast ==
- Hertha Feiler as Beate Klockenhoff
- Claus Holm as Franzl
- Marianne Hold as Dorle
- Richard Häussler as Philipp Klockenhoff
- Christine Kaufmann as Christine
- Maria Andergast as Marianne Klockenhoff
- Annie Rosar as Schneiderwirtin
- Theo Lingen as Dr. Krüger
- Harald Juhnke as Lenz
- Elfie Pertramer as Resi
- Peter Voß as Hotelbesitzer Wernecke

== Bibliography ==
- Reimer, Robert C.; Reimer, Carol J. (2010). The A to Z of German Cinema. Lanham, MD: Scarecrow Press. ISBN 978-0-8108-7611-8.
