= The Priest from Kirchfeld (1955 film) =

1955 film

- Directed by: Hans Deppe
- Written by: Ludwig Anzengruber (play); Ilse Lotz-Dupont; Tibor Yost
- Produced by: Hans Deppe; Wilhelm Gernhardt
- Starring: Ulla Jacobsson; Claus Holm; Annie Rosar
- Cinematography: Willy Winterstein
- Edited by: Johanna Meisel
- Music by: Heinrich Riethmüller
- Production company: Hans Deppe Film
- Distributed by: Constantin Film
- Release date: 21 July 1955
- Running time: 94 minutes
- Country: West Germany
- Language: German

The Priest from Kirchfeld (German: Der Pfarrer von Kirchfeld) is a 1955 West German drama film, directed by Hans Deppe. It starred Ulla Jacobsson, Claus Holm and Annie Rosar; and it is based on the play Der Pfarrer von Kirchfeld by Ludwig Anzengruber.

The film's sets were designed by the art directors, Willi Herrmann and Heinrich Weidemann. It was shot at the Spandau Studios and on location in Rosenheim, Bavaria.

== Plot ==
Vinzenz Heller (the priest of Kirchfeld) is highly esteemed by his congregation. The war widow Stricker lives with the railwayman Franz Wagner in the concubinage. Heller condemns this sin, but nevertheless, Stricker's ten-year-old boy Karli is allowed to serve as an altar boy to the priest. The only reason why the railwayman does not want to marry the Stricker is that they would lose their pension.

The Concordat provides, under certain circumstances before a secret marriage without a civil marriage must precede. For this reason Heller speaks to the Ordinariat. However, his request is denied because no social emergency is apparent.

In the parsonage the refugee girl Anna Birkmaier has been living for some time. This is supported by the old parishioner Brigitte. But the longer Anna stays in the parsonage, the more she feels attracted to the priest. He too begins to desire the girl, but he knows how to restrain his lust. Brigitte observes this development with great concern because she knows the gossip about the village. There is also one in the place, which is not well-disposed towards the priest: the rich innkeeper Josef Riedl. It can not be that the pastor once condemned the alcohol from the pulpit, whereupon fewer guests visited his place.

Anna is always more and more courted by the village smith Michl Ambacher. The girl, however, rejects him. She never wants to marry, but always stay in the parsonage. One day, she reveals to her boss that she is the mother of a little boy. He was in a neighboring place in nursing. His father had not been able to marry her because he died before all the documents were together. She had only applied for a position in Kirchfeld in order to be near her son.

One day Karli Stricker disappeared. His mother had left the news that he would never return. When he is found after a few days, the pastor is plagued by the bad conscience. Now he resists the prohibition of the church authorities and secretly marries the boy's mother with the railwayman. Someone in the village gets wind of it and makes sure that the news spreads quickly. To the parishioner, he was together with Anna with her son and then went to a concert with her in the city. They missed the last train and had to spend the night in the waiting room. When they return to Kirchfeld in the morning, they are watched by the innkeeper Riedl, whereupon he spreads the rumor, the priest had a relationship with his employees. Gradually more and more villagers turn away from the priest. When Anna realizes what is at stake for the priest, she agrees to marry the village smith, although she does not feel love for him. To the priest's attempt to dissuade her from her plan, the girl meets with the demand that he may give up his priesthood to enter into marriage with her. For this, however, Father Heller can not make up his mind. His last official address in Kirchfeld is Anna's marriage with Michl Ambacher. Then he is transferred to another community.

== Cast ==
- Ulla Jacobsson as Anna Birkmaier
- Claus Holm as Vinzenz Heller, Pfarrer von Kirchfeld
- Annie Rosar as Brigitte, Pfarrersköchin
- Heinrich Gretler as Sepp Riedl, Gastwirt
- Elise Aulinger as Mutter Riedl
- Kurt Heintel as Michi Ambacher
- Hansi Knoteck as Frau Stricher, Kriegerswitwe
- Helen Vita as Zenzi, Kelalnerin
- Fritz Genschow as Franz Wagner, Eisenbahner
- Hans Reiser as Friedrich Ademeit, Pianist
- Franz Schafheitlin as Prosecutor
- Olga Limburg as Oberin
- Peter Feldt as Karli

== Bibliography ==
- Goble, Alan. The Complete Index to Literary Sources in Film. Walter de Gruyter, 1999.
