= Hans Deppe =

German actor and film director

- Born: 12 November 1897; Berlin, German Empire
- Died: 23 September 1969 (aged 71); West Berlin, West Germany
- Occupations: Film actor Film director
- Years active: 1931–1969

Hans Deppe (German: [hans ˈdɛ.pə]; 12 November 1897 – 23 September 1969) was a German actor and film director.

== Filmography ==
=== As director ===
- Die rosarote Brille (1934, Short)
- Die kleinen Verwandten (1934, Short)
- The Rider on the White Horse (1934)
- Hubertus Castle (1934)
- Herr Kobin geht auf Abenteuer (1934)
- Holiday From Myself (1934)
- Bums, der Scheidungsgrund (1934, Short)
- A Night of Change (1935)
- The Saint and Her Fool (1935)
- The Valiant Navigator (1935)
- Der Außenseiter (1935)
- The Three Around Christine (1936)
- Street Music (1936)
- Drei tolle Tage (1936)
- The Hunter of Fall (1936)
- Das schöne Fräulein Schragg (1937)
- Meiseken (1937)
- Silence in the Forest (1937)
- 2 x 2 im Himmelbett (1937)
- Storms in May (1938)
- Fools in the Snow (1938)
- Scheidungsreise (1938)
- Die kluge Schwiegermutter (1939)
- The Scoundrel (1939)
- Verwandte sind auch Menschen (1940)
- Der Sündenbock (1940)
- Der laufende Berg (1941)
- Heimaterde (1941)
- The War of the Oxen (1943)
- A Salzburg Comedy (1943)
- Gefährlicher Frühling (1943)
- The Master of the Estate (1943)
- A Man Like Maximilian (1945)
- No Place for Love (1947)
- How Do We Tell Our Children? (1949)
- The Cuckoos (1949)
- My Wife's Friends (1949)
- Don't Play with Love (1949)
- One Night Apart (1950)
- The Black Forest Girl (1950)
- Not Without Gisela (1951)
- The Heath Is Green (1951)
- Holiday From Myself (1952)
- The Prince of Pappenheim (1952)
- The Land of Smiles (1952)
- Secretly Still and Quiet (1953)
- When the White Lilacs Bloom Again (1953)
- The Seven Dresses of Katrin (1954)
- The Country Schoolmaster (1954)
- The Great Lola (1954)
- Son Without a Home (1955)
- The Ambassador's Wife (1955)
- The Priest from Kirchfeld (1955)
- When the Alpine Roses Bloom (1955)
- Your Life Guards (1955)
- The Tour Guide of Lisbon (1956)
- A Thousand Melodies (1956)
- My Brother Joshua (1956)
- As Long as the Roses Bloom (1956)
- Beneath the Palms on the Blue Sea (1957)
- All Roads Lead Home (1957)
- Immer die Radfahrer (1958)
- Thirteen Old Donkeys (1958)
- That's No Way to Land a Man (1959)
- Mandolins and Moonlight (1959)
- Kein Mann zum Heiraten (1959)
- Guitars Sound Softly Through the Night (1959)
- The Domestic Tyrant (1959)
- When the Heath Is in Bloom (1960)
- Robert and Bertram (1961)
- I Must Go to the City (1962)
- Unsere Jenny (1962, TV film)
- Wie lernt man Reisen? (1966, TV film)

=== As actor ===
- The Street Song (1931)
- Berlin-Alexanderplatz (1931)
- Storms of Passion (1932)
- The Victor (1932)
- A Blonde Dream (1932)
- Two Hearts Beat as One (1932)
- Die Wette (1933, Short)
- A City Upside Down (1933)
- Großstadtnacht (1933)
- A Door Opens (1933)
- The Empress and I (1933)
- The Little Crook (1933)
- Ein gewisser Herr Gran (1933)
- Hitlerjunge Quex (1933)
- Happy Days in Aranjuez (1933)
- Der Stern von Valencia (1933)
- The Rider on the White Horse (1934)
- Pappi (1934)
- Frau Eva wird mondain! (1934, Short)
- Street Music (1936)
- The Berliner (1948)
- Your Life Guards (1955)
- Freddy and the Song of the South Pacific (1962)
- Der Fall Rohrbach (1963, TV miniseries)
- Man soll den Onkel nicht vergiften (1965, TV film)
- Förster Horn (1966, TV series)
- Socialaristokraten (1966, TV film)
- Unwiederbringlich (1968, TV film)
- Mathilde Möhring (1969, TV film)
- Zwei ahnungslose Engel (1969, TV film)
- Christmas Not Just Once a Year (1970, TV film)
