= Hans Fitz =

German actor and screenwriter

- Born: 21 December 1891; Neustadt an der Orla, Saxe-Weimar-Eisenach, German Empire
- Died: 28 October 1972 (aged 80); Krailling, Bavaria, West Germany
- Other name: James Theodor August Fitz
- Occupation: Actor
- Years active: 1934-1972 (film & TV)

Hans Fitz (1891–1972) was a German actor and screenwriter.

== Selected filmography ==
- Women's Regiment (1936)
- Search for Majora (1949)
- Who Is This That I Love? (1950)
- Fanfares of Love (1951)
- The Blue and White Lion (1952)
- Monks, Girls and Hungarian Soldiers (1952)
- Marriage Strike (1953)
- The Royal Waltz (1955)
- Her First Date (1955)
- Two Bavarians in the Jungle (1957)
- And Lead Us Not Into Temptation (1957)
- My Sweetheart Is from Tyrol (1958)
- At Blonde Kathrein's Place (1959)
- Two Bavarians in Bonn (1962)
- Hugo, the Woman Chaser (1969)

== Bibliography ==
- Goble, Alan. The Complete Index to Literary Sources in Film. Walter de Gruyter, 1999.
