= Onkel Filser – Allerneueste Lausbubengeschichten =

1966 film

- Directed by: Werner Jacobs
- Based on: novel by Ludwig Thoma
- Starring: Michl Lang; Hansi Kraus; Fritz Tillmann
- Release date: 1966
- Country: Germany
- Language: German

Onkel Filser – Allerneueste Lausbubengeschichten is a 1966 West German comedy film directed by Werner Jacobs and starring Michl Lang, Hans Kraus and Fritz Tillmann. It was based on a novel by Ludwig Thoma and is the fifth in series of films.

== Partial cast ==
- Michl Lang as Onkel Josef Filser
- Hansi Kraus as Ludwig Thoma
- Fritz Tillmann as Bezirksamtmann Traugott Stiebner
- Monika Dahlberg as Rosa Damböck
- Hans Quest as Rittmeister Friedrich Wilhelm von Stülphagel
- Elfie Pertramer as Cordula Damböck
- Gustav Knuth as Gustav Schultheiss
- Beppo Brem as Hauptwachtmeister Korbinian Damböck
- Rudolf Rhomberg as Kaplan 'Kindlein' Falkenberg
- Hans Terofal as Schreiber Klasel and Xaver
- Käthe Braun as Therese Thoma
- Karl Schönböck as Baron von Rupp
- Michael Hinz as Max von Rupp
- Evelyn Gressmann as Prinzessin Cecilie Amalie von Sachsen-Meiningen
- Rudolf Schündler as Professor Liebrecht Mutius
- Anton Reimer as Oberstudiendirektor Orterer
- Renate Kasché as Ännchen Schultheiss, geb. Thoma
- Fred Liewehr as Prinzregent
- Michael Verhoeven as Karl Schultheiss
- Friedrich von Thun as Franz Reiser
- Erika Blumberger as Ex-Geliebte von Josef Filser
- Margarete Haagen as Kathi
- Hinrich Rehwinkel as Kammersänger
- Ulrich Beiger: Fraktionsvorsitzender
- Petra Falge as Liesl
- Max Grießer as Leibgardist Loibl
- Ludwig Schmid-Wildy as Parteivorstand
- Willy Schultes as Pedell Schöberl
- Elisabeth Flickenschildt as Tante Frieda
- Heidelinde Weis as Cousine Cora Reiser

== See also ==
- The Blue and White Lion (1952)
