= Harald Juhnke =

German actor, comedian, and singer (1929–2005)

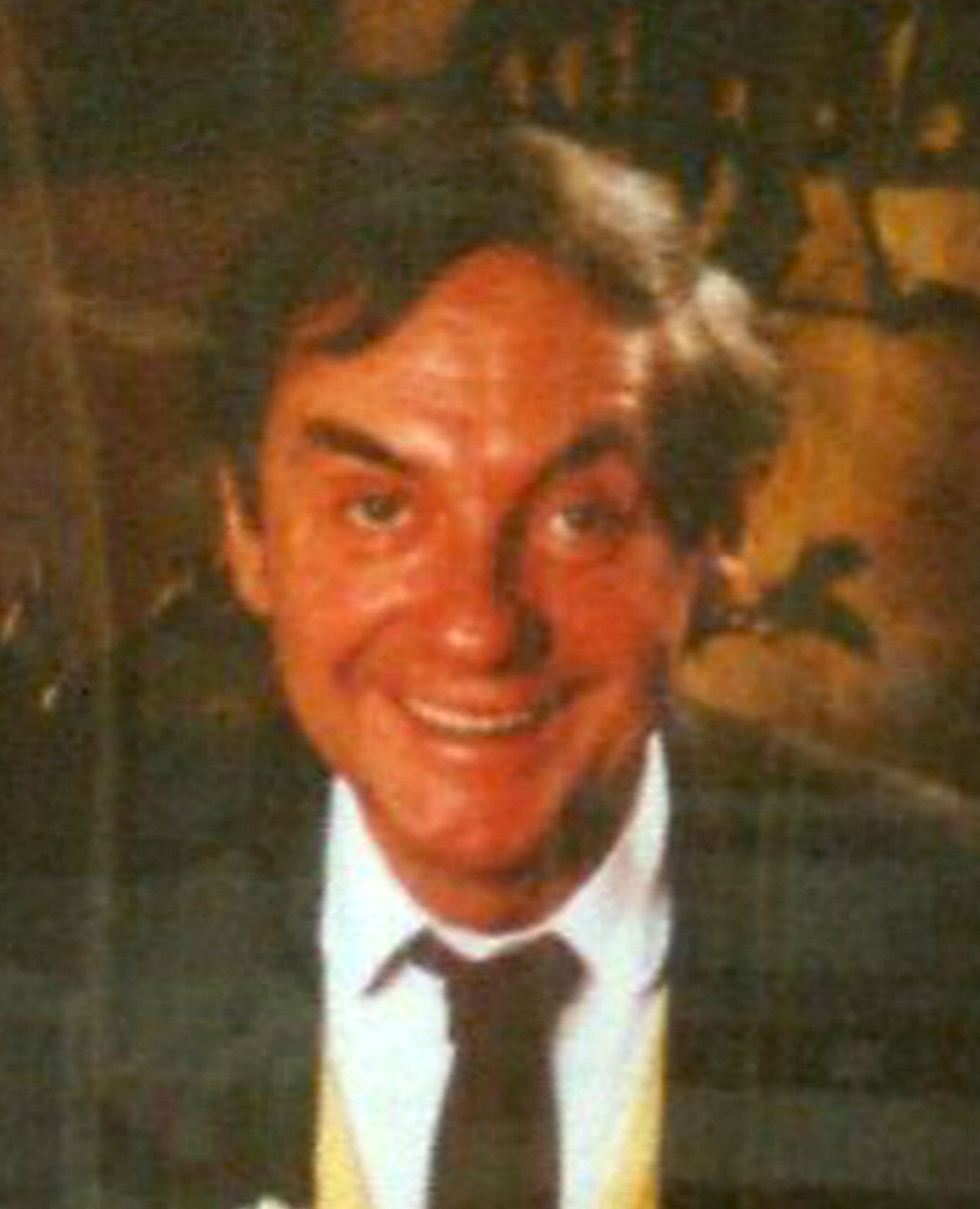
- Juhnke in 2004
- Born: Harry Heinz Herbert Juhnke; 10 June 1929; Berlin-Charlottenburg, West Germany
- Died: 1 April 2005 (aged 75); Rüdersdorf, Germany
- Occupations: Actor; comedian
- Years active: 1948–2005
- Known for: Frank Sinatra impersonation

Harald Juhnke (German pronunciation: ['juːnkə], born Harry Heinz Herbert Juhnke, 10 June 1929 – 1 April 2005), was a German actor, comedian, and singer.

== Life and career ==
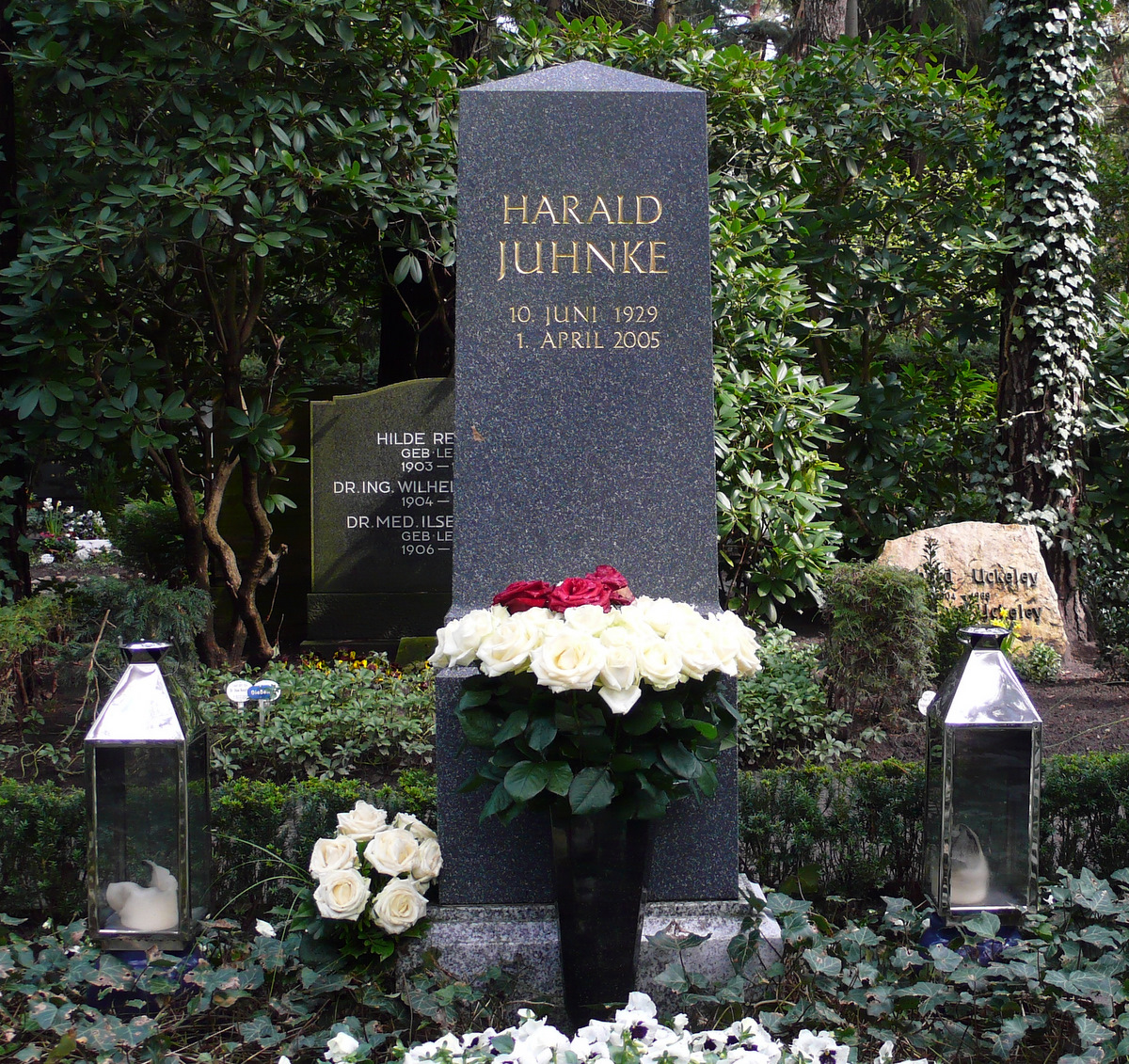
Juhnke's grave in Berlin

Juhnke was born in Berlin-Charlottenburg. His father was a police officer and his mother came from a family of bakers. He grew up in the working-class district of Gesundbrunnen in Berlin.

His first stage appearance was in 1948. In 1950, he was hired by the theater in Neustrelitz. In the following years, he worked in several other theaters, including the Volksbühne in Berlin.

Juhnke began appearing on German television after 1977. He played in a number of television series and later hosted the ZDF television show Musik ist Trumpf. He often sang on the shows he hosted, in particular emulating Frank Sinatra. Juhnke went on to record several albums between the years 1968 and 1999.

In 1992, Juhnke experienced a comeback as a film actor. He won praise from critics for character parts in the movies Schtonk!, The Parrot, and Der Hauptmann von Köpenick. In 1995, he played the lead role in the movie The Drinker, based on the autobiography of German writer Hans Fallada.

His first marriage was to actress and dancer Sybil Werden. The couple had two children: their daughter Barbara was born in 1953 and in 1956, they had a son, Peer. In 1971, Juhnke married actress Susanne Hsiao. They had a son, Oliver Marlon, who was born in 1972.

Juhnke suffered from severe alcoholism during most of his adult life, with his dependence repeatedly resulting in detrimental media attention and career setbacks. In February 2005, he was hospitalized with acute dehydration. He died in Rüdersdorf, near Berlin, at the age of 75.

== Awards ==
- 1978: Goldener Vorhang award of Berlin's Theaterclub
- 1980: Goldene Kamera
- 1990: Goldene Europa – Honored as an entertainer of the 1980s and 1990s
- 1992: Deutscher Filmpreis
- 1992: Bambi Award
- 1993: Ernst Lubitsch Preis
- 1993: Bayerischer Fernsehpreis
- 1993: Karl Valentin Order
- 1993: Romy – Television actor of the year
- 1995: Critic's Award of the Berliner Zeitung for lifetime accomplishment
- 1996: Telestar
- 1998: Goldener Löwe (RTL)
- 2000: Goldene Kamera

== Selected filmography ==
- Three Girls Spinning (1950) – Pastor Krempel
- The Blue Hour (1953) – Fred
- Hit Parade (1953) – Alfred
- The Dancing Heart (1953) – Julius
- The Stronger Woman (1953) – Bob
- Guitars of Love (1954) – Walter
- Doctor Solm (1955) – Konrad, Solm's stepbrother
- How Do I Become a Film Star? (1955) – Günther Scholz
- Heroism after Hours (1955) – Burmann
- Request Concert (1955) – Horn
- When the Alpine Roses Bloom (1955) – Lenz
- Your Life Guards (1955) – Hansen
- The Model Husband (1956) – Billy Haber
- Beneath the Palms on the Blue Sea (1957) – Freddy Glass
- Greetings and Kisses from Tegernsee (1957) – Billy
- The Mad Bomberg (1957) – Dr. Roland
- Almenrausch and Edelweiss (1957) – Max Lachner
- The Green Devils of Monte Cassino (1958) – Hugo Lembke
- U 47 – Kapitänleutnant Prien (1958) – The Smut
- La Paloma (1959) – Peter
- At Blonde Kathrein's Place (1959) – Weyrauch
- Hula-Hopp, Conny (1959) — Dr. Robert Berning
- A Thousand Stars Aglitter (1959) – Axel Grenner Jr.
- I Learned That in Paris (1960) – Mathias Mai, layer
- Do Not Send Your Wife to Italy (1960) – Karl Beetz
- The Last Witness (1960) – Criminal secretary Wenzel
- Davon träumen alle Mädchen (1961) – Jochen
- What Is Father Doing in Italy? (1961) – Mr. Akaschian
- Isola Bella (1961) – Anton
- The Sold Grandfather (1962) – Max Krause
- Das Testament des Dr. Mabuse (1962) – Assistant detective Krüger
- Tomfoolery in Zell am See (1963) – Pit Tanner
- Golden Goddess of Rio Beni (1964) – Tom
- Tales of a Young Scamp (1964) – Stuewe
- Red Dragon (1965) – Smoky
- Die Letzten drei der Albatross (1965) – Kuddel Lehmann
- The Murderer with the Silk Scarf (1966) – Chief Inspector Charly Fischer
- Hurra, die Schule brennt! (1969) – Speaker
- Der Kommissar (1970, TV series) – Gerhard Diebach
- Auch ich war nur ein mittelmäßiger Schüler (1974) – Arzt
- Sergeant Berry (1975, TV series) – Sergeant Albert Berry
- Derrick (1976, TV series) – Prinx
- Ein verrücktes Paar (1977–1980, TV series) – Harald
- Ein Mann will nach oben (1978, TV series) – Franz Wagenseil
- Leute wie du und ich (1980–1984, TV series) – Harald
- Schuld sind nur die Frauen (1982, TV movie) – Philipe Bernard
- Siggi, the Street Cleaner (1984) – Sigi Stenz
- Harald und Eddi (1987–1990, TV series)
- Die Hallo-Sisters (1990) – Henne
- Schtonk! (1992) – Kummer
- The Parrot (1992) – Dieter "Did" Stricker
- Back to Square One (1994) – Georg Kuballa
- Asterix Conquers America (1994) – Narrator (German Dub)
- The Drinker (1995, TV Movie) – Erwin Sommer
- Conversation with the Beast (1996) – Hitler double
- Der Hauptmann von Köpenick (1997, TV movie) – Wilhelm Voigt

== Discography ==
=== Studio albums ===
- Mit beiden Händen in den Taschen (1968)
- Aber vor allem würde ich trinken! (1976)
- Ein Mann für alle Fälle (1979)
- Harald Juhnke (1981)
- Schuld sind nur die Frau'n (1982)
- Goodbye Madame (1983)
- Barfuß oder Lackschuh (1989)
- Manchmal ein Clown sein (1992)
- His Way (1998)
- That's life (1999)

=== Live albums ===
- Tonight Harald (1984)
- My Way – Das Beste (1995)
