= Holiday From Myself (1934 film) =

1934 film

- Speelmans as the American businessman (centre) enjoying his escape from a hectic life.
- German: Ferien vom Ich
- Directed by: Hans Deppe
- Written by: Paul Keller (novel); Peter Francke
- Produced by: Peter Ostermayr; Alfred Zeisler
- Starring: Hermann Speelmans; Carola Höhn; Georg H. Schnell
- Cinematography: Hugo von Kaweczynski
- Edited by: Paul May
- Music by: Marc Roland
- Production company: Olf Fjord-Film
- Distributed by: UFA
- Release date: 7 December 1934
- Country: Germany
- Language: German

Holiday From Myself (German: Ferien vom Ich) is a 1934 German comedy film directed by Hans Deppe and starring Hermann Speelmans, Carola Höhn, and Georg H. Schnell.

The film's sets were designed by the art directors Willi Herrmann and Hans Kuhnert. It was partly shot on location in Lower Saxony. Deppe himself directed a remake of the film in 1952.

== Plot ==
A stressed American millionaire is advised by his doctor to take some downtime and rest in the German countryside. The tycoon is so impressed that he buys an estate and turns it into a resort where other businessmen can take holidays from their stressful lives. In the process he falls in love with the estate's former owner.

== Cast ==
- Hermann Speelmans as Georges B. Steffenson, American large-scale industrialist
- Carola Höhn as Eva von Dornberg
- Georg H. Schnell as Dr. Hartung, doctor
- Hans Zesch-Ballot as John Stone, Secretary General of Steffenson
- Ewald Wenck as Lehmann, Factotum of the guest house
- Hans Adalbert Schlettow as Barthel, Gutsinspektor
- Gina Falckenberg as Doris, John Stone's sister
- Walter Steinbeck as Eberhardt Kreutzer, director
- Fritz Genschow as Erich Bürger, clerk
- Cilly Feindt as Elisabeth Schuhmacher
- Paul Henckels as Hein Stumpe, justice
- Werner Finck as Ottokar Geldern
- Eduard Wesener as Robert Braun
- Ernst Behmer as August Stempel, chancellery secretary
- Else Reval as Klärchen - Stempel's wife
- Vilma Bekendorf
- Hermann Braun
- Richard Handwerk
- Resi Langer
- Karin Luesebrink
- Marianne Mewes
- Carl Walther Meyer
- Gerti Ober
- Friedrich Franz Stampe
- Hans Stiebner
