= Hans Quest =

German actor (1915–1997)

- Born: 20 August 1915; Herford, Province of Westphalia, Prussia, German Empire
- Died: 29 March 1997 (aged 81); Munich, Germany
- Occupations: Actor, Film director
- Spouses: Charlotte Witthauer; Ingrid Capelle
- Children: 2

Hans Quest (August 20, 1915 – March 29, 1997) was a German actor and film director.

== Selected filmography ==
Director

- Wenn der Vater mit dem Sohne (1955)
- The Happy Wanderer (1955)
- Charley's Aunt (1956)
- Wenn Poldi ins Manöver zieht (1956)
- Ein Mann muß nicht immer schön sein (1956)
- The Girl Without Pyjamas (1957)
- Kindermädchen für Papa gesucht (1957)
- The Big Chance (1957)
- Die Lindenwirtin vom Donaustrand (1957)
- One Should Be Twenty Again (1958)
- My Sweetheart Is from Tyrol (1958)
- Nick Knatterton’s Adventure (1959)
- Twelve Girls and One Man (1959)
- At Blonde Kathrein's Place (1959)
- The Time Has Come (1960, TV series)
- Pichler's Books Are Not in Order (1961)
- Das Halstuch (1962, TV miniseries)
- Tim Frazer (1963-64, TV series)
- Der Mann, der keinen Mord beging (1968, TV miniseries)
- Father Brown (1970-1972, TV series)
- Manolescu – Die fast wahre Biographie eines Gauners (1972, TV film)

Actor

- The Immortal Heart (1939) - Henner
- Der dunkle Punkt (1940)
- Friedrich Schiller – The Triumph of a Genius (1940) - Student Hoven
- My Life for Ireland (1941) - Henry Beverley
- Riding for Germany (1941) - Sohn des Fuhrwerksbesitzers
- Bismarck's Dismissal (1942)
- Sophienlund (1943) - Jürgen
- Verspieltes Leben (1949) - Kadett Kurt von Ellmer
- The Blue Swords (1949) - Johann Böttger
- No Greater Love (1952)
- The Country Schoolmaster (1954) - Ludwig, Ursulas Bruder
- Sauerbruch – Das war mein Leben (1954) - Dr. Berthold
- Love is Forever (1954) - Hasske
- Ludwig II (1955) - Kapellmeister Eckert
- Beloved Enemy (1955) - Ward, Sekretär bei Gore
- Sacred Lie (1955)
- The Ambassador's Wife (1955) - Holmgreen
- Urlaub auf Ehrenwort (1955) - Gustav Jahnke
- Magic Fire (1956) - Robert Hubner
- Drayman Henschel (1956) - Dr. Listig
- The Last Ones Shall Be First (1957) - Young attorney
- The Big Chance (1957) - Eduard Brüggemann (uncredited)
- Taiga (1958) - Weinert
- Ja, so ein Mädchen mit 16 (1959) - Marinetti
- Die zornigen jungen Männer (1960) - Pater
- Die Schlüssel (1965, TV Mini-Series) - Thomas Quayle
- Aunt Frieda (1965) - Rittmeister von Stuelphagel
- Onkel Filser – Allerneueste Lausbubengeschichten (1966) - Rittmeister Friedrich Wilhelm von Stülphagel
- When Ludwig Goes on Manoeuvres (1967) - Rittmeister von Stuelphagel
- Birdie (1971) - Rolf
- Hauptsache Ferien (1972) - Oberschulrat
- Abelard (1977)
- The Serpent's Egg (1977) - Dr. Silbermann
- Der Havarist (1984) - Narrator
- Mary Ward (1985) - Englischer Prälat
- Boundaries of Time: Caspar David Friedrich (1986) - Ernst Moritz Arndt
- Der 13. Tag (1991) - Präsident Benes
