= Hans Grimm (director) =

- Born: 30 January 1905; Rehau, Bavaria, German Empire
- Died: 12 September 1998 (aged 93); Luino, Lombardy, Italy
- Occupation: Director
- Years active: 1930 - 1985

Hans Grimm (1905–1998) was a German film director.

== Selected filmography ==
- Fanfare of Marriage (1953)
- My Father, the Actor (1956)
- Do Not Send Your Wife to Italy (1960)
- Isola Bella (1961)
- Darling (1961)
- When the Music Plays at Wörthersee (1962)

== Bibliography ==
- Sabine Schrader & Daniel Winkler. The Cinemas of Italian Migration: European and Transatlantic Narratives. Cambridge Scholars Publishing, 2014.
