= Marianne Hold =

German actress (1933–1994)

- Born: 15 May 1933; Johannisburg, East Prussia, Germany
- Died: 11 September 1994 (aged 61); Lugano, Switzerland
- Resting place: Witikon Cemetery
- Occupation: actress
- Years active: 1950–1964
- Spouse: Frederick Stafford (m. 1964; died 1979)
- Children: Jean Paul Roderick (b. 1964)

Marianne Hold (15 May 1933 – 11 September 1994) was a German movie actress who became popular in the 1950s and 1960s for her numerous roles in the Heimatfilm genre—romantic comedy films set in rural, especially Alpine, areas. She served as the inspiration for the female characters created by manga artist Leiji Matsumoto.

== Biography ==
Born Marianne Weiss in Johannisburg, East Prussia (today Pisz, Poland), Hold had to flee with her mother when World War II was drawing to a close, and they settled in Innsbruck. Her father did not return from the war. When her mother married again Hold, after disagreements with her stepfather, went to Rome, Italy, where she took various jobs. Her brother Siegfried Hold went on to become a cinematographer.

In 1950 she was offered her first big role by Luis Trenker, and starred with him in Barrier to the North. Her breakthrough role was in Die Fischerin vom Bodensee in 1956. Many more Heimatfilme followed.

While filming Mission to Hell (1964) Hold met Slovak-born actor Friedrich Strobel von Stein, alias Frederick Stafford, and married him. Their son, Roderick Stafford, was born in the same year. Hold then retired from the movie business.

She died of a heart attack in Lugano, Switzerland.

== Filmography ==
- Barrier to the North (1950)
- Holiday From Myself (1952)
- Ava Maria (1953)
- Wedding Bells (1954)
- Marianne of My Youth (1955)
- Heimatland (1955)
- When the Alpine Roses Bloom (1955)
- Escape to the Dolomites (1955)
- Pulverschnee nach Übersee (1956)
- Die Fischerin vom Bodensee (1956)
- Like Once Lili Marleen (1956)
- Von der Liebe besiegt / Schicksal am Matterhorn (1956)
- Die Lindenwirtin vom Donaustrand (1957)
- Die Prinzessin von St.Wolfgang (1957)
- Wetterleuchten um Maria (1957)
- Heimatlos (1958)
- My Sweetheart Is from Tyrol (1958)
- Black Forest Cherry Schnapps (1958)
- The Priest and the Girl (1958)
- At Blonde Kathrein's Place (1959)
- Kein Mann zum Heiraten (1959)
- Do Not Send Your Wife to Italy (1960)
- Sooo nicht, meine Herren! (1960)
- Schön ist die Liebe am Königssee (1960)
- Isola Bella (1961)
- Darling (1961)
- Waldrausch (1962)
- Wild Water (1962)
- Mission to Hell (1964)
- The Shoot (1964)
