= Erna Fentsch =

German actress (1909–1997)

- Born: 21 April 1909; Munich, Germany
- Died: 26 November 1997 (aged 88)
- Occupations: Actress; Screenwriter
- Years active: 1932–1977

Erna Fentsch (21 April 1909 – 26 November 1997) was a German actress and screenwriter. She appeared 18 films between 1932 and 1944.

== Selected filmography ==
- A Man with Heart (1932)
- The Tunnel (1933)
- The Champion of Pontresina (1934)
- Marriage Strike (1935)
- The Monastery's Hunter (1935)
- The Unsuspecting Angel (1936)
- Under Blazing Heavens (1936)
- Women's Regiment (1936)
- The Sinful Village (1940)
- The White Hell of Pitz Palu (1950)
- The Exchange (1952)
- Have Sunshine in Your Heart (1953)
- The Confession of Ina Kahr (1954)
- Crown Prince Rudolph's Last Love (1955)
- Sebastian Kneipp (1958)
