= Holiday From Myself (1952 film) =

1952 film

- Directed by: Hans Deppe
- Written by: Peter Francke; Paul Keller (novel)
- Produced by: Hans Deppe
- Starring: Rudolf Prack; Marianne Hold; Willy Fritsch
- Cinematography: Willy Winterstein
- Edited by: Walter Wischniewsky
- Music by: Marc Roland
- Production company: H.D. Film
- Distributed by: Gloria Film
- Release date: 11 November 1952
- Running time: 107 minutes
- Country: West Germany
- Language: German

Holiday From Myself (German: Ferien vom Ich) is a 1952 West German comedy film directed by Hans Deppe and starring Rudolf Prack, Marianne Hold and Willy Fritsch. It was shot at the Göttingen Studios with sets designed by the art director Ernst H. Albrecht. It is a remake of Deppe's 1934 film of the same title.

== Cast ==
- Rudolf Prack as George B. Stefenson
- Marianne Hold as Eva von Dornberg
- Willy Fritsch as Dr. Hartung
- Grethe Weiser as Käthe Greiser, genannt Lieschen
- Paul Henckels as Heinrich Stumpe, genannt Philipp
- Oskar Sima as Ferdinand Unterkirchner, genannt August
- Hannelore Bollmann as Henny Busch, genannt Hannelore
- Gunnar Möller as Michael Matz, genannt Thomas
- Werner Fuetterer as Stone, Stefensons Privatsekretär
- Ewald Wenck as Lehmann, Kastellan
- Hans Hermann Schaufuß as Heinz Tiedemann, genannt Alexander
- Carsta Löck as Frau Mohr, Wirtschafterin
- Irene Naef as Liane Harrison, genannt Minna
- Erna Sellmer
- Ursula Barlen
- Karin Luesebrink
- Else Reval as Klärchen Tiedemann
- Edith Schneider

== Bibliography ==
- Hans-Michael Bock and Tim Bergfelder. The Concise Cinegraph: An Encyclopedia of German Cinema. Berghahn Books, 2009.
