= I Must Go to the City =

1962 film

- Directed by: Hans Deppe
- Written by: Gustav Kampendonk
- Produced by: Franz Seitz Jr.; Hans Terofal
- Starring: Vico Torriani; Barbara Frey; Monika Dahlberg
- Cinematography: Erich Küchler; Heinz Schnackertz
- Edited by: Ingeborg Taschner
- Music by: Friedrich Meyer
- Production company: Franz Seitz Filmproduktion
- Distributed by: Nora-Filmverleih
- Release date: 17 August 1962
- Running time: 91 minutes
- Country: West Germany
- Language: German

I Must Go to the City (German: Muss i denn zum Städtele hinaus) is a 1962 West German romance film directed by Hans Deppe and starring Vico Torriani, Barbara Frey and Monika Dahlberg. Its title is a reference to the traditional German song. It was made at the Spandau Studios in Berlin. The film's sets were designed by the art director Max Mellin.

== Cast ==
- Vico Torriani as Clown Richie
- Barbara Frey as Heidi Hagen
- Monika Dahlberg as Eva
- Erik Schumann as Dr. Werner Koch
- Dieter Borsche as Onkel Herbert Drontheim
- Carola Höhn as Tante Carola Drontheim
- Peter Nestler as Ronald Brown
- Eduard Linkers as Bankdirektor Sieper
- Vera Complojer as Haushälterin Röschen
- Fredy Brock as Otto
- Georg Blädel as Sepp

== Bibliography ==
- Hans-Michael Bock and Tim Bergfelder. The Concise Cinegraph: An Encyclopedia of German Cinema. Berghahn Books, 2009.
