= Barbara Frey =

German stage and film actress

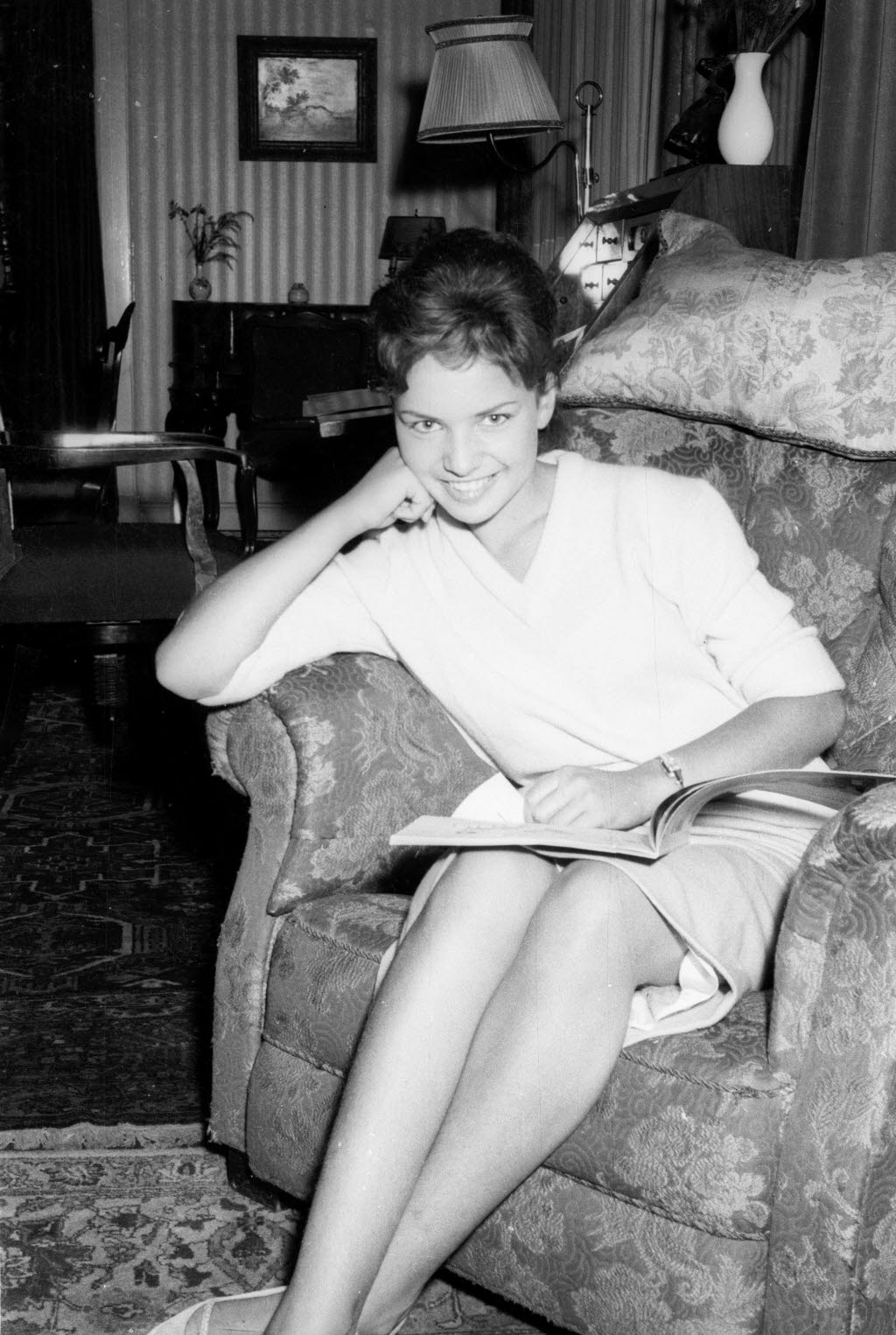
- Frey in 1958
- Born: 17 November 1941 (age 84); Berlin, Germany
- Occupation: Actress

Barbara Frey (born 1941) is a German stage and film actress. She was married to the actor Mark Damon.

== Selected filmography ==
- Endstation Liebe (1958)
- Mit 17 weint man nicht (1960)
- Man in the Shadows (1961)
- What Is Father Doing in Italy? (1961)
- Love at Twenty (1962)
- I Must Go to the City (1962)
- 100 Horsemen (1964)
- Our Crazy Aunts in the South Seas (1964)
- Stranger in Sacramento (1965)
- Kommissar X – In den Klauen des goldenen Drachen (1966)
- Requiescant (1967)
- Ein Mann namens Harry Brent (1968, TV miniseries)

== Bibliography ==
- Robert Von Dassanowsky. Austrian Cinema: A History. McFarland, 2005.
