= Two Bavarians in Bonn =

1962 film

- Directed by: Rudolf Lubowski
- Written by: Ernst Welisch; Rudolf Lubowski; Ilse von Gasteiger; Hans Fitz
- Produced by: Erwin C. Dietrich
- Starring: Beppo Brem; Hans Fitz; Lucie Englisch
- Cinematography: Peter Baumgartner; Walter Tuch
- Edited by: Henri W. Sokal
- Music by: Hans Conzelmann; Cédric Dumont; Delle Haensch
- Production companies: Urania-Filmproduktion; Monachia Zeynfilm
- Distributed by: Neue Film Allianz; Sascha Film (Austria)
- Release date: 17 August 1962
- Running time: 87 minutes
- Country: West Germany
- Language: German

Two Bavarians in Bonn (German: Zwei Bayern in Bonn) is a 1962 West German comedy film directed by Rudolf Lubowski and starring Beppo Brem, Hans Fitz and Lucie Englisch. It is the third and final sequel to the 1956 film Two Bavarians in St. Pauli. This time the action is shifted to the German political capital Bonn.

== Cast ==
- Beppo Brem as Bürgermeister Vinzenz Kreithuber
- Hans Fitz as Wirt Josef Prechtl
- Lucie Englisch as Kreithuberin
- Hannelore Bollmann as Gaby
- Thomas Reiner as Regierungsrat Dr. Bodo Blücher
- Elke Arendt as Inge Schulz
- Karl Tischlinger as Domberger
- Rolf von Nauckhoff as Familienminister
- Erni Singerl as Stasi
- Hans Stadtmüller as Moser
- Thomas Alder as Dr. Frank
- Rosel Günther as Köchin
- Werner Finck as Atomminister

== Bibliography ==
- Eppenberger, Benedikt; Stapfer, Daniel (2006). Mädchen, Machos und Moneten – Die unglaubliche Geschichte des Schweizer Kinounternehmers Erwin C. Dietrich. Zürich: Verlag Scharfe Stiefel. ISBN 978-3-033-00960-8.
