= Hans Putz =

Austrian actor

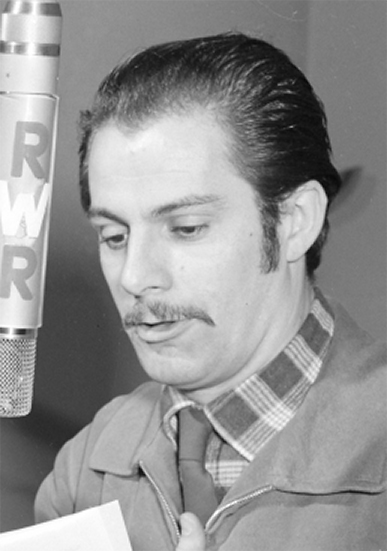
Hans Putz

Hans Putz (November 17, 1920 in Vienna – January 31, 1990 in Hamburg) was an Austrian actor. He had a stage career, including working at the Schauspielhaus Zürich and the Volkstheater in Vienna; he also appeared in a number of films.

== Partial filmography ==
- Gottes Engel sind überall (1948) - Franz Wudra
- Arlberg Express (1948) - Flori Reutner
- Lambert fühlt sich bedroht (1949) - (uncredited)
- Rosen der Liebe (1949) - Praterbesucher Ferdl
- Der Schuß durchs Fenster (1950) - Chauffeur Strinzel
- The Fourth Commandment (1950) - Martin Schalanter - beider Sohn
- Großstadtnacht (1950)
- Four in a Jeep (1951) - Karl Idinger
- Gangsterpremiere (1951) - Willi
- Wienerinnen (1952) - Paul Rosenauer
- Vanished Melody (1952) - Toni
- Lavender (1953) - Kramer
- Anna Louise and Anton (1953) - Robert
- König der Manege (1954) - Jack Holl, Aktrobat, Tänzer
- Bruder Martin (1954) - Steighofer
- Hoheit lassen bitten (1954) - Lembke
- The Eternal Waltz (1954) - Alexander Girardi
- The Doctor's Secret (1955) - Charly
- His Daughter is Called Peter (1955)
- The Dairymaid of St. Kathrein (1955) - Franz
- Ein Herz schlägt für Erika (1956)
- Teenage Wolfpack (1956)
- Ein Mann muß nicht immer schön sein (1956) - Taschenkrebs
- For Love and Others (1959) - Dr. Morsky
- Im Namen einer Mutter (1960) - Wendland
- Hin und her (1963)
- In der Sache J. Robert Oppenheimer (1964) - Borris T. Pasch
- I Am Looking for a Man (1966) - Bauunternehmer Märtens
- The Murderer with the Silk Scarf (1966) - Toni Stein (voice, uncredited)
- The Smooth Career (1967) - Wolf Kamper
- Sir Roger Casement (1968, TV Series) - Arthur Conan Doyle
- Einer fehlt beim Kurkonzert (1968, TV Movie) - Oberkommissar Leo Klipp
- St. Pauli Report (1971) - Paul Besser
- Der letzte Werkelmann (1972) - Leo Wessely
- Die Konsequenz (1976, TV Movie) - Dusterer
- Moselbrück (1987–1993, TV Series) - Ludwig Zerfass (final appearance)
