= Max Mellin =

German production designer (1904–1977)

- Born: 30 January 1904; Berlin, German Empire
- Died: March 17, 1977 (aged 73); Mühldorf am Inn, Bavaria, West Germany
- Occupation: Art director
- Years active: 1933–1973 (film)

Max Mellin (30 January 1904 – 17 March 1977) was a German art director.

== Selected filmography ==
- Goodbye, Beautiful Days (1933)
- Happy Days in Aranjuez (1933)
- Young Dessau's Great Love (1933)
- The Girlfriend of a Big Man (1934)
- Playing with Fire (1934)
- Marriage Strike (1935)
- Fresh Wind from Canada (1935)
- Winter in the Woods (1936)
- Women's Regiment (1936)
- Lady Killer (1937)
- What Now, Sibylle? (1938)
- Kitty and the World Conference (1939)
- The Governor (1939)
- Counterfeiters (1940)
- The Old Boss (1942)
- Music in Salzburg (1944)
- Hello, Fraulein! (1949)
- The Secret of the Red Cat (1949)
- The Blue Straw Hat (1949)
- Everything for the Company (1950)
- Love on Ice (1950)
- Farewell Mister Grock (1950)
- Love and Blood (1951)
- The Lady in Black (1951)
- Captive Soul (1952)
- Towers of Silence (1952)
- The Imaginary Invalid (1952)
- Roses Bloom on the Moorland (1952)
- The Last Waltz (1953)
- The Angel with the Flaming Sword (1954)
- The Sinful Village (1954)
- Request Concert (1955)
- Lost Child 312 (1955)
- Doctor Bertram (1957)
- A Doctor of Conviction (1959)
- Do Not Send Your Wife to Italy (1960)
- Isola Bella (1961)
- I Must Go to the City (1962)
- The Swedish Girl (1965)
- Red Dragon (1965)

== Bibliography ==
- Kay Weniger: Das große Personenlexikon des Films. Die Schauspieler, Regisseure, Kameraleute, Produzenten, Komponisten, Drehbuchautoren, Filmarchitekten, Ausstatter, Kostümbildner, Cutter, Tontechniker, Maskenbildner und Special Effects Designer des 20. Jahrhunderts. Vol. 5: L – N. Rudolf Lettinger – Lloyd Nolan. Schwarzkopf & Schwarzkopf, Berlin 2001, ISBN 3-89602-340-3, p. 385.
- Wolfgang Jacobsen & Hans Helmut Prinzler. Käutner. Spiess, 1992.
