= Waldrausch (1977 film) =

West German drama film

- Directed by: Horst Hächler
- Written by: Ludwig Ganghofer (novel); Horst Hächler
- Produced by: Horst Hächler; Lothar H. Krischer
- Starring: Uschi Glas; Alexander Stephan; Siegfried Rauch
- Cinematography: Fritz Baader; Ernst W. Kalinke
- Edited by: Inge Moritz; Ingeborg Taschner
- Music by: Ernst Brandner
- Production companies: CTV 72 Film und Fernsehproduktion; Terra-Filmkunst
- Distributed by: Constantin Film
- Release date: 7 September 1977
- Running time: 100 minutes
- Country: West Germany
- Language: German

Waldrausch is a 1977 West German drama film directed by Horst Hächler and starring Uschi Glas, Alexander Stephan and Siegfried Rauch. It was based on the 1907 novel Waldrausch by Ludwig Ganghofer.

== Synopsis ==
A farmer tries to block an architect's ambitious plans to build a new dam and flood a valley.

== Main cast ==
- Uschi Glas as Fürstin
- Alexander Stephan as Ambros Lutz
- Siegfried Rauch as Krischbin
- Kristina Nel as Beda
- Bernhard Helfrich as Toni
- Adrian Hoven as Angelo
- Sigfrit Steiner as Waldrauscher
- Gerhard Riedmann as Wohlverstand
- Ralf Wolter as Rixner
- Rose Renée Roth as Hanna

== Bibliography ==
- Goble, Alan (1999). The Complete Index to Literary Sources in Film. Walter de Gruyter. ISBN 978-3-11-095194-3.
