= Heinz Schnackertz =

German cinematographer

- Born: 12 May 1911; Cologne, Prussia, German Empire
- Died: 4 March 1990 (aged 78); Munich, Bavaria, West Germany
- Occupation: Cinematographer
- Years active: 1938-1977 (film)

Heinz Schnackertz (1911–1990) was a German cinematographer.

== Selected filmography ==
- Liberated Hands (1939)
- Johann (1943)
- In the Temple of Venus (1948)
- My Wife's Friends (1949)
- A Heart Beats for You (1949)
- Love on Ice (1950)
- The Violin Maker of Mittenwald (1950)
- Roses Bloom on the Moorland (1952)
- Heartbroken on the Moselle (1953)
- Fear (1954)
- A Girl from Paris (1954)
- André and Ursula (1955)
- The Beggar Student (1956)
- San Salvatore (1956)
- The Winemaker of Langenlois (1957)
- My Sweetheart Is from Tyrol (1958)
- The Scarlet Baroness (1959)
- At Blonde Kathrein's Place (1959)
- The White Horse Inn (1960)
- Do Not Send Your Wife to Italy (1960)
- Isola Bella (1961)
- I Must Go to the City (1962)
- The Swedish Girl (1965)

== Bibliography ==
- Sidney Gottlieb. Roberto Rossellini's Rome Open City. Cambridge University Press, 2004.
