= Michl Lang =

- Born: 16 January 1899; Kempten, German Empire
- Died: 21 December 1979 (aged 80); Munich, West Germany
- Occupation: Actor
- Years active: 1936–1972 (film & TV)

Michl Lang (16 January 1899 – 21 December 1979) was a German stage and film actor

== Selected filmography ==
- The Unsuspecting Angel (1936)
- Secret File W.B.1 (1942)
- A Heart Beats for You (1949)
- King for One Night (1950)
- Fanfares of Love (1951)
- The Cloister of Martins (1951)
- That Can Happen to Anyone (1952)
- Illusion in a Minor Key (1952)
- Fireworks (1954)
- A Woman of Today (1954)
- The Forest House in Tyrol (1955)
- San Salvatore (1956)
- Two Bavarians in St. Pauli (1956)
- Where the Ancient Forests Rustle (1956)
- Salzburg Stories (1957)
- Wir Wunderkinder (1958)
- I Was All His (1958)
- The Green Devils of Monte Cassino (1958)
- Paprika (1959)
- At Blonde Kathrein's Place (1959)
- Storm in a Water Glass (1960)
- Isola Bella (1961)
- Tomfoolery in Zell am See (1963)
- Tales of a Young Scamp (1964)
- Aunt Frieda (1965)
- The Swedish Girl (1965)
- The Sinful Village (1966)
- Onkel Filser – Allerneueste Lausbubengeschichten (1966)

== Bibliography ==
- Goble, Alan. The Complete Index to Literary Sources in Film. Walter de Gruyter, 1999.
