= Franz Seitz Jr. =

German film producer

- Born: 22 October 1921; Munich, Germany
- Died: 19 January 2006 (aged 84); Munich, Germany
- Occupations: Film producer Screenwriter; Film director
- Years active: 1951–2006

Franz Seitz Jr. (22 October 1921 – 19 January 2006) was a German film producer, screenwriter and film director. He produced more than 70 films between 1951 and 2006. He was a member of the jury at the 16th Berlin International Film Festival.

His 1982 film Doctor Faustus was entered into the 13th Moscow International Film Festival where it won the Silver Prize. In 1983 he was a member of the jury at the 33rd Berlin International Film Festival. In 1991 his film Success was entered into the 41st Berlin International Film Festival. In 1997 he won the Berlinale Camera award at the 47th Berlin International Film Festival.

His father, Franz Seitz Sr. was also a film director.

== Selected filmography ==
- The Last Shot (1951)
- Jackboot Mutiny, directed by G. W. Pabst (1955)
- The Twins from Zillertal (1957)
- The Green Devils of Monte Cassino (1958)
- My Sweetheart Is from Tyrol (1958)
- The Scarlet Baroness (1959)
- At Blonde Kathrein's Place (1959)
- Do Not Send Your Wife to Italy (1960)
- Darling (1961)
- What Is Father Doing in Italy? (1961)
- I Must Go to the City (1962)
- The River Line (1964)
- Tales of a Young Scamp (1964)
- Tonio Kröger, directed by Rolf Thiele (1964)
- The Blood of the Walsungs, directed by Rolf Thiele (1965)
- The Gentlemen (1965)
- The Swedish Girl (1965)
- Aunt Frieda (1965)
- I Am Looking for a Man (1966)
- Once a Greek (1966)
- Love Nights in the Taiga (1967)
- When Ludwig Goes on Manoeuvres, directed by Werner Jacobs (1967)
- The Sex of Angels, directed by Ugo Liberatore (1968)
- We'll Take Care of the Teachers (1970)
- The Flying Classroom (1973)
- The Pedestrian, directed by Maximilian Schell (1973)
- When Mother Went on Strike (1974)
- Abelard, directed by Franz Seitz (1977)
- Disorder and Early Torment, directed by Franz Seitz (1977)
- Die Jugendstreiche des Knaben Karl, directed by Franz Seitz (1977)
- The Tin Drum, directed by Volker Schlöndorff (1979)
- Doctor Faustus, directed by Franz Seitz (1982)
- The Magic Mountain (1982)
- Flammenzeichen, directed by Franz Seitz (1985)
- Success, directed by Franz Seitz (1991)
