= The Saint and Her Fool (1935 film) =

- Directed by: Hans Deppe; Paul May (supervising); Peter Ostermayr (supervising)
- Written by: Peter Francke; Agnes Günther (novel)
- Produced by: Paul May
- Starring: Friedrich Ulmer; Lola Chlud; Hansi Knoteck
- Cinematography: Hugo von Kaweczynski
- Edited by: Paul May
- Music by: Franz R. Friedl
- Production company: Tonlicht-Film
- Distributed by: UFA
- Release date: 6 September 1935
- Running time: 82 minutes
- Country: Germany
- Language: German

The Saint and Her Fool (German: Die Heilige und ihr Narr) is a 1935 German drama film directed by Hans Deppe and Paul May and starring Friedrich Ulmer, Lola Chlud and Hansi Knoteck.

The film's sets were designed by the art directors Artur Günther and Hans Kuhnert. It was shot at the Babelsberg Studios in Berlin and on location around Langenburg Castle and Oberstdorf in Bavaria.

Along with a 1928 German silent film and a 1957 Austrian film, it was one of three film adaptations of the novel of the same title by Agnes Günther.

== Cast ==
- Friedrich Ulmer as Georg, Fürst v. Brauneck
- Lola Chlud as Charlotte, Fürstin v. Brauneck
- Hansi Knoteck as Prinzessin Rosmarie
- Hans Stüwe as Graf Harro Thorstein
- Carl Ehrhardt-Hardt as Hans Friedrich, Musiker
- F.W. Schröder-Schrom as Medizinalrat
- Werner Pledath as Domprobst
- Beppo Brem as Christoph
- Hanni Weisse
- Petra Unkel as Rosemarie als Kind
- Lillian Berley
- Jeanette Bethge
- Erich Dunskus
- William Huch
- Georg Irmer as Diener
- Hilde Muth
- Erika Nymgau-Odemar as Wirtschafterin
- Erika Raphael

== Bibliography ==
- Goble, Alan. The Complete Index to Literary Sources in Film. Walter de Gruyter, 1999.
