= The Happy Village =

1955 film

- Directed by: Rudolf Schündler
- Written by: August Hinrichs (play); Gustav Kampendonk
- Produced by: Karl Mitschke; Kurt Ulrich; Heinz Willeg
- Starring: Hannelore Bollmann; Carl Hinrichs; Gerhard Riedmann
- Cinematography: Bruno Mondi
- Edited by: Margarete Steinborn
- Music by: Willy Mattes
- Production company: Berolina Film
- Distributed by: Gloria Film
- Release date: 16 September 1955
- Running time: 93 minutes
- Country: West Germany
- Language: German

The Happy Village (German: Das fröhliche Dorf) is a 1955 West German comedy film directed by Rudolf Schündler and starring Hannelore Bollmann, Carl Hinrichs and Gerhard Riedmann. It is a remake of the 1934 German film Trouble with Jolanthe. It was shot at the Tempelhof Studios in West Berlin and the Bendestorf Studios outside Hamburg. Location shooting took place around Lüneburg Heath. The film's sets were designed by the art director Hans Kuhnert.

== Cast ==
- Hannelore Bollmann as Anna Lamken
- Carl Hinrichs as Krischan Lamken
- Gerhard Riedmann as Walter Meiners, Lehrer
- Gardy Granass as Sophie Kordes
- Peter Carsten as Gerd Bunje, Müller
- Carla Hagen as Stine, Magd
- Günther Lüders as Hinnerk, Knecht
- Paul Westermeier as Konrad Husch, Gendarm
- Charlott Daudert as Erna Dünnschede
- Ernst Waldow as Heinrich Jeschke, Gerichtsvollzieher
- Georg Pahl as Opa Kordes, Schäfer
- Hansjoerg Boeger as Bauer Harms
- Otto Schroeder as Bauer Jochen

== Bibliography ==
- Williams, Alan. Film and Nationalism. Rutgers University Press, 2002.
