= The Saint and Her Fool (1957 film) =

- Austrian film poster
- German: Die Heilige und ihr Narr
- Directed by: Gustav Ucicky
- Based on: The Saint and Her Fool by Agnes Günther
- Produced by: Herbert Gruber; Karl Schwetter
- Starring: Gerhard Riedmann; Gudula Blau; Hertha Feiler
- Cinematography: Günther Anders
- Edited by: Herma Sandtner
- Music by: Franz Grothe
- Production company: Sascha Film
- Distributed by: Gloria Film
- Release date: 1 November 1957
- Running time: 91 minutes
- Country: Austria
- Language: German

The Saint and Her Fool (German: Die Heilige und ihr Narr) is a 1957 Austrian drama film directed by Gustav Ucicky and starring Gerhard Riedmann, Gudula Blau and Hertha Feiler.

It was based on the novel of the same title by Agnes Günther. Two previous film versions had been made, a silent film in 1928 and a sound film in 1935.

The film's sets were designed by the art directors Isabella Schlichting and Werner Schlichting. It was shot using Agfacolor. It was made with backing from the West German distributor Gloria Film.

== Cast ==
- Gerhard Riedmann as Harro
- Gudula Blau as Rosmarie
- Hertha Feiler as Charlotte
- Willy Birgel as Prince von Brauneck
- Heinrich Gretler as Professor Guter
- Franca Parisi as Angelina
- Alma Seidler as Lisa
- Hugo Gottschlich as Caliban
- Karl Skraup as Sanitätsrat
- Elisabeth Epp as Frau Sprüngli
- Auguste Ripper as Giulietta
- Ruth Scheerbarth as Frl. Braun
- Brigitte Stanzel as little Rosmarie
- Karl Hruschka as postman
