= The Saint and Her Fool =

1928 film

- Directed by: William Dieterle
- Written by: Agnes Günther (novel); Curt J. Braun; Charlotte Hagenbruch
- Produced by: William Dieterle
- Starring: William Dieterle; Lien Deyers; Gina Manès; Félix P. Soler
- Cinematography: Frederik Fuglsang
- Production company: Deutsche Film Union
- Distributed by: Deutsche First National Pictures
- Release date: 4 October 1928
- Country: Germany
- Languages: Silent; German intertitles

The Saint and Her Fool (German: Die Heilige und ihr Narr) is a 1928 German silent drama film directed by William Dieterle and starring Dieterle, Lien Deyers and Gina Manès. It was based on a novel by Agnes Günther and premiered at the Capital am Zoo in Berlin. Art direction was by Andrej Andrejew. For a long time, the movie was considered lost. Although never released in the US, a nitrate copy was discovered in Jack Warner's personal vault. In 2008 it was given to the UCLA in Los Angeles and restored.

It was remade twice into a 1935 German film directed by Hans Deppe, music by Franz R. Friedl and a 1957 Austrian film directed by Gustav Ucicky.

== Cast ==
- William Dieterle as Harro, Graf von Torstein
- Lien Deyers as Rosemarie von Brauneck
- Gina Manès as Fürstin von Brauneck
- Félix P. Soler as Fürst von Brauneck
- Camilla von Hollay as Fräulein Braun
- Mathilde Sussin as Frau von Hardenstein
- Heinrich Gotho as Märt
- Sophie Pagay as Tante Uli
- Auguste Prasch-Grevenberg as Tante Marga
- Hanni Reinwald as Lisa, Rosemaries Zofe
- Loni Nest as Rosemarie als Kind

== Bibliography ==
- Kreimeier, Klaus. The Ufa Story: A History of Germany's Greatest Film Company, 1918-1945. University of California Press, 1999.
