= Mona Seefried =

Austrian actress

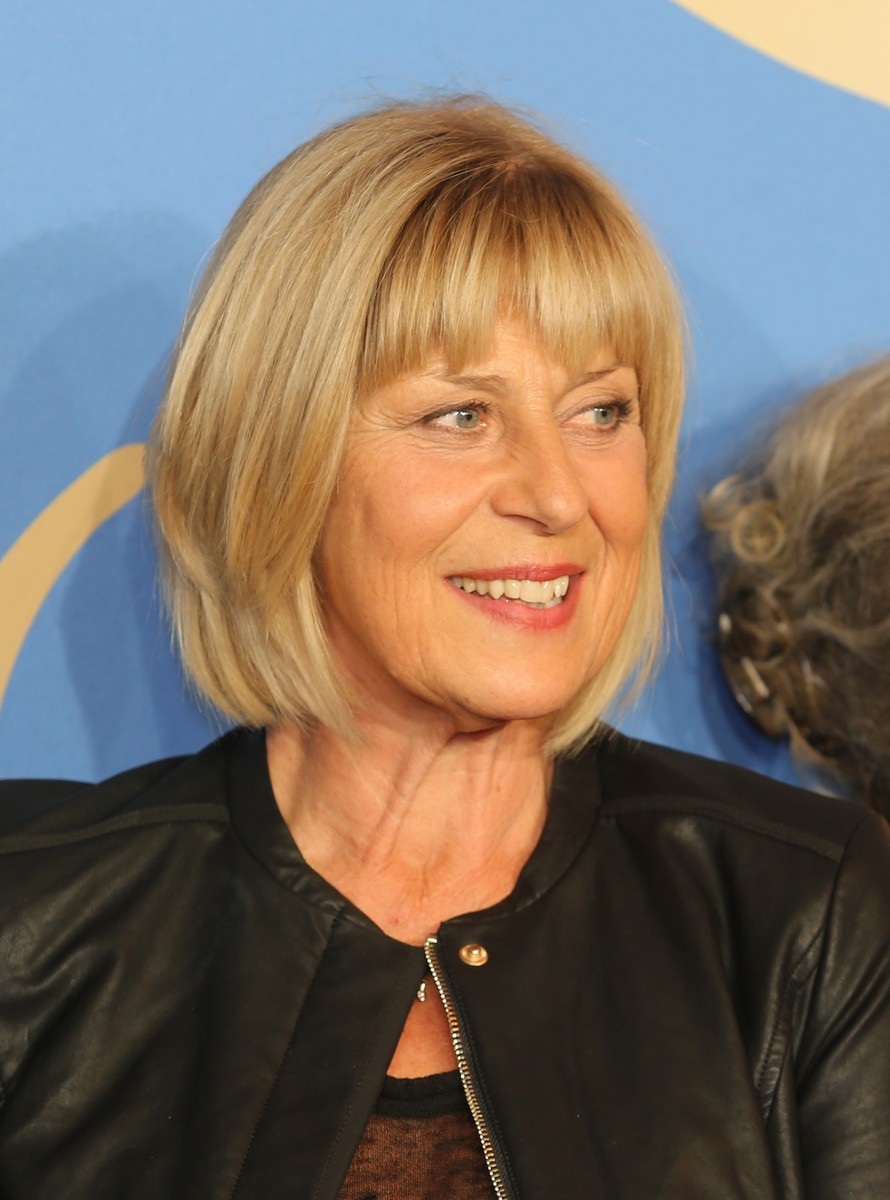
- Mona Seefried
- Occupation: Actress
- Years active: 1977–present

Mona Seefried (real name Mona Seefried-Funck) is an Austrian actress. She gained great fame through her portrayal of Charlotte Saalfeld, one of the main roles in the ARD telenovela Sturm der Liebe, which she played continuously from September 2005 to May 2018.

She was brought up as a theater artist in Vienna before moving on to Hamburg and later Berlin in Germany. She started with minor television roles before her breakthrough with the telenovela Sturm der Liebe.

== Early life and career ==
From 1980 to 1985 she was a member of the Berlin state drama theater ensemble under the direction of Boy Gobert.

She gained great fame through her portrayal of Charlotte Saalfeld, one of the main roles in the ARD telenovela Sturm der Liebe (Storm of Love), which she played continuously from September 2005 to May 2018. However, she repeatedly took time out to take on other tasks such as filming the ORF crime series Donau. On March 12, 2018, Seefried announced her final exit from the successful telenovela, in which she had been a part from the beginning. The last episode, in which Charlotte Saalfeld emigrated to Africa forever, was broadcast on May 16, 2018. Even before her role in Sturm der Liebe, Seefried was seen in television roles, such as Marienhof in Praxis Bülowbogen and as Louiserl in the Christmas films Single Bells and O Palmenbaum by Uli and Xaver Schwarzenberger.

== Personal life ==
Seefried was in a relationship with the actor Nikolaus Paryla. Their daughter from this relationship Laura Maria Schneiderhan was born in 1989. Laura Maria also studied opera singing and acting in Vienna. In 1992, actress Seefried married her series partner Peter E. Funck from the ARD series Marienhof. She lives with her husband in the west of Munich and in their house in the Marche region of Italy. Seefried has been a member of the IVQS foundation's board of trustees since 2019 which fights against poverty among actors in old age.

== Selected filmography ==
- 1984: Berliner Weiße mit Schuß (TV series)
- 1984: Eine Klasse für sich (TV series)
- 1988: Liebling Kreuzberg (TV series, Folge 02x06)
- 1988: A.D.A.M.
- 1987–1989, 1995: Praxis Bülowbogen (TV series)
- 1990: Der Fahnder (TV series)
- 1992–1995: Marienhof (TV series)
- 1994: Felidae
- 1995: Polizeiruf 110 – Abgründe (TV series)
- 1995: Dr. Stefan Frank – Der Arzt, dem die Frauen vertrauen
- 1995: Vater wider Willen
- 1997: First Love – Die große Liebe
- 1997: Single Bells
- 1998: Beule oder wie man einen Tresor knackt
- 1998: Nicht von schlechten Eltern
- 1999: Deine besten Jahre
- 1999: Schlosshotel Orth
- 1999: SOKO 5113 (TV series)
- 2000: O Palmenbaum
- 2000: Samt und Seide (TV series)
- 2001: Der Bulle von Tölz: Sioux City
- 2003: Kunden und andere Katastrophen (TV series)
- 2005–2008: SOKO Donau (TV series)
- 2005–2021: Um Himmels Willen (TV series)
- 2005: Neue Freunde, neues Glück (TV film)
- 2005: Polizeiruf 110 – Der scharlachrote Engel (TV series)
- 2005–2018: Sturm der Liebe (TV series)
- 2006: Herzdamen
- 2007: Annas Geheimnis
- 2009: Geschichten aus den Bergen – Traum meines Lebens
- 2009: Die Blücherbande (TV film)
- 2013: Herzdamen an der Elbe
- 2017: Um Himmels Willen
- 2018: Eine schöne Bescherung
- 2018: Winterherz – Tod in einer kalten Nacht
- 2019: Hartwig Seeler – Gefährliche Erinnerung
- 2020: 4000 Tage
- 2020: Bettys Diagnose – Erwartungshaltungen
- 2021: Die Schule der magischen Tiere
- 2023: Griechenland
