= Willi Herrmann =

German art director

- Born: 24 January 1893; Berlin, German Empire
- Died: 15 February 1968 (aged 75); West Berlin, West Germany
- Occupation: Art director
- Years active: 1916–1965 (film)

Willi Herrmann (1893–1968) was a German art director.

== Selected filmography ==
- Madness (1919)
- Child on the Open Road (1919)
- Jettatore (1919)
- Humanity Unleashed (1920)
- The Secrets of Berlin (1921)
- The Maharaja's Victory (1923)
- The Third Watch (1924)
- Ship in Distress (1925)
- The King and the Girl (1925)
- The Man on the Comet (1925)
- The Fire Dancer (1925)
- Nick, King of the Chauffeurs (1925)
- Frisian Blood (1925)
- People in Need (1925)
- Eyes Open, Harry! (1926)
- The Good Reputation (1926)
- German Hearts on the German Rhine (1926)
- Bismarck 1862–1898 (1927)
- The Lorelei (1927)
- On the Banks of the River Weser (1927)
- Night of Mystery (1927)
- The Merry Farmer (1927)
- Circus Renz (1927)
- The Last Performance of the Circus Wolfson (1928)
- Give Me Life (1928)
- The King of Carnival (1928)
- The Beloved of His Highness (1928)
- Song (1928)
- Tales from the Vienna Woods (1928)
- Tragedy at the Royal Circus (1928)
- His Strongest Weapon (1928)
- The League of Three (1929)
- The Tsarevich (1929)
- High Treason (1929)
- The Flame of Love (1930)
- The Citadel of Warsaw (1930)
- Flachsmann the Educator (1930)
- The Shot in the Sound Film Studio (1930)
- Susanne Cleans Up (1930)
- The Blonde Nightingale (1930)
- The Tiger Murder Case (1930)
- Express 13 (1931)
- A Crafty Youth (1931)
- The Secret of the Red Cat (1931)
- Ash Wednesday (1931)
- You Will Be My Wife (1932)
- At Your Orders, Sergeant (1932)
- Spoiling the Game (1932)
- Ship Without a Harbour (1932)
- Crime Reporter Holm (1932)
- The Invisible Front (1932)
- Two Heavenly Blue Eyes (1932)
- Girls of Today (1933)
- The Sandwich Girl (1933)
- Gretel Wins First Prize (1933)
- Jumping Into the Abyss (1933)
- The World Without a Mask (1934)
- Holiday From Myself (1934)
- Last Stop (1935)
- Moscow-Shanghai (1936)
- The Czar's Courier (1936)
- Talking About Jacqueline (1937)
- Alarm in Peking (1937)
- Central Rio (1939)
- Escape in the Dark (1939)
- Men Are That Way (1939)
- Front Theatre (1942)
- The Trip to Marrakesh (1949)
- Don't Play with Love (1949)
- Martina (1949)
- Girls Behind Bars (1949)
- The Reluctant Maharaja (1950)
- Scandal at the Embassy (1950)
- When Men Cheat (1950)
- The Dubarry (1951)
- Rose of the Mountain (1952)
- Mikosch Comes In (1952)
- Klettermaxe (1952)
- When The Village Music Plays on Sunday Nights (1953)
- Hooray, It's a Boy! (1953)
- The Seven Dresses of Katrin (1954)
- On the Reeperbahn at Half Past Midnight (1954)
- The Beautiful Miller (1954)
- The Faithful Hussar (1954)
- The Country Schoolmaster (1954)
- Love is Forever (1954)
- Emil and the Detectives (1954)
- The Gypsy Baron (1954)
- Son Without a Home (1955)
- The Ambassador's Wife (1955)
- Your Life Guards (1955)
- Sergeant Borck (1955)
- The Tour Guide of Lisbon (1956)
- My Brother Joshua (1956)
- As Long as the Roses Bloom (1956)
- All Roads Lead Home (1957)
- Greetings and Kisses from Tegernsee (1957)
- Paradise for Sailors (1959)
- Every Day Isn't Sunday (1959)
- The Avenger (1960)
- Three Men in a Boat (1961)

== Bibliography ==
- Giesen, Rolf (2003). Nazi Propaganda Films: A History and Filmography. Jefferson, NC: McFarland. ISBN 978-0-7864-3870-9.
