= Johanna Meisel =

German film editor

- Occupation: Editor
- Years active: 1940–1962 (film)

Johanna Meisel was a German film editor. She edited fifty six films between 1940 and 1962.

== Selected filmography ==
- Commissioner Eyck (1940)
- Clarissa (1941)
- The Impostor (1944)
- Peter Voss, Thief of Millions (1946)
- Street Acquaintances (1948)
- Don't Play with Love (1949)
- Quartet of Five (1949)
- Don't Dream, Annette (1949)
- The Appeal to Conscience (1949)
- The Orplid Mystery (1950)
- The Reluctant Maharaja (1950)
- Five Suspects (1950)
- Dark Eyes (1951)
- Wedding in the Hay (1951)
- Queen of the Night (1951)
- All Clues Lead to Berlin (1952)
- The Chaste Libertine (1952)
- You Only Live Once (1952)
- Love's Awakening (1953)
- The Uncle from America (1953)
- The Seven Dresses of Katrin (1954)
- The Ambassador's Wife (1955)
- The Spanish Fly (1955)
- When the Alpine Roses Bloom (1955)
- Son Without a Home (1955)
- Your Life Guards (1955)
- The Priest from Kirchfeld (1955)
- Beneath the Palms on the Blue Sea (1956)
- The Tour Guide of Lisbon (1956)
- As Long as the Roses Bloom (1956)
- Greetings and Kisses from Tegernsee (1957)
- All Roads Lead Home (1957)
- The Star of Santa Clara (1958)
- The Csardas King (1958)
- Mandolins and Moonlight (1959)

== Bibliography ==
- Rolf Giesen. Nazi Propaganda Films: A History and Filmography. McFarland, 2003.
