= Heinrich Weidemann =

German art director (1899–1982)

- Born: 25 January 1899; Schwerin, German Empire
- Died: 17 February 1982 (aged 83); West Berlin, West Germany
- Occupation: Art director
- Years active: 1937-1967 (film)

Heinrich Weidemann (1899–1982) was a German art director.

== Selected filmography ==
- The Gambler (1938)
- The Swedish Nightingale (1941)
- Journey into the Past (1943)
- Bravo, Little Thomas (1945)
- Ghost in the Castle (1947)
- The Trip to Marrakesh (1949)
- The Reluctant Maharaja (1950)
- Scandal at the Embassy (1950)
- When Men Cheat (1950)
- The Dubarry (1951)
- Rose of the Mountain (1952)
- Mikosch Comes In (1952)
- Klettermaxe (1952)
- Mailman Mueller (1953)
- Hooray, It's a Boy! (1953)
- When The Village Music Plays on Sunday Nights (1953)
- Love is Forever (1954)
- The Gypsy Baron (1954)
- The Beautiful Miller (1954)
- The Faithful Hussar (1954)
- On the Reeperbahn at Half Past Midnight (1954)
- Emil and the Detectives (1954)
- The Country Schoolmaster (1954)
- The Ambassador's Wife (1955)
- When the Alpine Roses Bloom (1955)
- Your Life Guards (1955)
- Sergeant Borck (1955)
- The Tour Guide of Lisbon (1956)
- My Brother Joshua (1956)
- As Long as the Roses Bloom (1956)
- Greetings and Kisses from Tegernsee (1957)
- All Roads Lead Home (1957)
- The Csardas King (1958)
- Abschied von den Wolken (1959)
- Peter Shoots Down the Bird (1959)
- One, Two, Three (1961)
- Freddy in the Wild West (1964)
- Girls Behind Bars (1965)
- The Doctor Speaks Out (1966)
- Witness Out of Hell (1966)

== Bibliography ==
- Lowe, Barry. Atomic Blonde: The Films of Mamie Van Doren. McFarland, 2008.
