= Carl Hinrichs =

German actor (1907–1967)

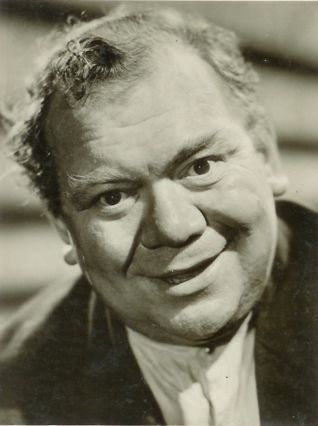
Carl Hinrichs

Carl Hinrichs (September 18, 1907 – December 7, 1967) was a German stage and film actor.

== Selected filmography ==
- On the Reeperbahn at Half Past Midnight (1954)
- The Happy Village (1955)
- The Three from the Filling Station (1955)
- Hoppla, jetzt kommt Eddie (1958)

== Bibliography ==
- Körner, Torsten. Der kleine Mann als Star: Heinz Rühmann und seine Filme der 50er Jahre. Campus Verlag, 2001.
