= Your Life Guards =

1955 film

- Directed by: Hans Deppe
- Written by: Bobby E. Lüthge
- Produced by: Johannes J. Frank; Wilhelm Gernhardt
- Starring: Ingrid Andree; Gerhard Riedmann; Wolf Albach-Retty
- Cinematography: Willy Winterstein
- Edited by: Johanna Meisel
- Music by: Willy Mattes
- Production company: Hans Deppe Film
- Distributed by: Deutsche London Film
- Release date: 20 December 1955
- Running time: 98 minutes
- Country: West Germany
- Language: German

Your Life Guards or Your Life Regiment (German: Ihr Leibregiment) is a 1955 West German romantic comedy film directed by Hans Deppe and starring Ingrid Andree, Gerhard Riedmann and Wolf Albach-Retty.

The film's sets were designed by the art director Willi Herrmann and Heinrich Weidemann. It was made using eastmancolor. The film was partly shot on location at Charlottenburg Palace.

== Cast ==
- Ingrid Andree as Prinzessin Ingrid
- Gerhard Riedmann as Alexander
- Wolf Albach-Retty as Onkel Nikolaus
- Jester Naefe as Rita Lamberti
- Erika von Thellmann as Frau von Zeisig
- Harald Juhnke as Hansen
- Wolfgang Lukschy as Manager
- Günter Pfitzmann as Charly
- Annie Rosar as Tante Mafalda
- Edith Hancke as Zofe
- Herbert Hübner as Hofmarschall
- Franz Schafheitlin as Flügeladjutant
- Kurt Vespermann as Professor
- Paul Esser as Oberst
- Hans Deppe as Buchhändler
- Erich Fiedler as Staatsrat
- Joe Furtner as Bibliothekar
- Ralf Wolter as Bursche Jonny
- Henry Lorenzen as Mann mit Schlapphut
- Anneliese Würtz as Alte Katrein
- Franz Riess as Alter Major
- Renée Franke as Singer

== Bibliography ==
- Bliersbach, Gerhard (1985). So grün war die Heide: der deutsche Nachkriegsfilm in neuer Sicht (in German). Beltz. ISBN 978-3-407-85055-3.
