= The Empress of China (film) =

1953 film

- Directed by: Steve Sekely
- Written by: Hannes Peter Stolp (Wilhelm Hermann Löb); Vineta Bastian-Klinger
- Produced by: Artur Brauner
- Starring: Grethe Weiser; Nadja Tiller; Joachim Brennecke
- Cinematography: Kurt Hasse
- Edited by: Hermann Leitner
- Music by: Michael Jary
- Production company: CCC Film
- Distributed by: Prisma
- Release date: 25 September 1953
- Running time: 85 minutes
- Country: West Germany
- Language: German

The Empress of China (German: Die Kaiserin von China) is a 1953 German comedy film directed by Steve Sekely and starring Grethe Weiser, Nadja Tiller and Joachim Brennecke.

It was shot at the Spandau Studios and on location at Wannsee in Berlin. The film's sets were designed by the art directors Karl Schneider and Kurt Herlth.

== Cast ==
- Grethe Weiser as Tante Clementine
- Nadja Tiller as Viktoria
- Joachim Brennecke as Heinrich Morland
- Ernst Waldow as Professor Mirrzahler
- Edith Schollwer as Frau Lose
- Kurt Vespermann as Herr Lose
- Ruth Stephan
- Erich Fiedler
- Ursula Herking
- Hans Zesch-Ballot as Dr. Stansberg
- Maria Zach
- Rolf Weih as Dr. Müller
- Wolfgang Neuss as Wonderful
- Wolfgang Müller as Wanderstein
- Heinz Holl
- Gerd Vespermann
- Peter Lehmbrock
- Herbert Weissbach
- Joe Furtner
- Lys Assia as Sängerin
- Ilja Glusgal as Sänger
- Harold Horn as Dancer
- Liane Müller as Dancer
- Ursula Voß

== Bibliography ==
- Bergfelder, Tim (2005). International Adventures: German Popular Cinema and European Co-productions in the 1960s. Berghahn Books. ISBN 978-1-57181-539-2.
