= Berliner Weiße mit Schuß =

German television series

- Country of origin: Germany

Berliner Weisse mit Schuss is a television series of the ZDF (Zweites Deutsches Fernsehen) that was produced from 1984 to 1995. Each episode consisted of several self-contained stories in which Günter Pfitzmann took a starring role. Special emphasis was placed on the regional character of Berlin and all episodes (with exception of a holiday episode) took place in Berlin and many characters even spoke with a Berlin accent.

== Plot ==
The episodes were designed to be entertaining and told from the perspective of the "little people" and oftentimes ended with a final punch that demonstrated strong values. For example, the plot of the first episode, The Police Officer's Gift, revolved around a burglar (played by Pfitzmann) that the police mistakenly thought was the homeowner and due to this misunderstanding the burglar was allowed to escape with his loot.

== Main casts ==
- Günter Pfitzmann
- Andrea Brix
- Manfred Lehmann
- Barbara Schöne
- Hans-Werner Bussinger
- Waltraud Habicht
- Karl Schulz

== Guest stars ==
A lot of well-known actors and actresses from Berlin could be seen in supporting roles in the series including Edith Hancke, Tilly Lauenstein, Manfred Lehmann, Brigitte Mira, Inge Wolffberg, Wilfried Herbst, Edeltraut Elsner, Peter Schiff, Peer Schmidt, Gert Haucke, Gerd Duwner, Wolfgang Gruner, and also Christina Horn.

== Namesake ==
The name Berliner Weisse mit Schuss comes from the alcoholic drink of the same name.

== DVD release ==
All of the episodes of the series were released as a box set in 2007 which included six DVDs.

== See also ==
- List of German television series
