= Herbert Wilk =

German stage, television and film actor

- Born: May 10, 1905; Gnoien, Grand Duchy of Mecklenburg-Schwerin; German Empire
- Died: November 2, 1977 (aged 72); West Berlin, West Germany
- Occupation: Actor
- Years active: 1936 - 1970 (film)

Herbert Wilk (1905–1977) was a German stage, television and film actor. He emerged as a screen actor during the Nazi era, appearing in war films such as U-Boote westwärts (1941). However the bulk of his career came after the Second World War. After initially appearing in films made by the East German studio DEFA, he largely worked in West German television for the remainder of his career.

== Selected filmography ==
- The Desert Song (1939)
- Commissioner Eyck (1940)
- The Rothschilds (1940)
- U-Boote westwärts (1941)
- Stukas (1941)
- Free Land (1946)
- The Beaver Coat (1949)
- The Girl from the South Seas (1950)
- Woe to Him Who Loves (1951)
- Canaris (1954)
- The Mosquito (1954)
- Stresemann (1957)
- The Unexcused Hour (1957)
- The Black Chapel (1959)
- Blind Justice (1961)

== Bibliography ==
- Kreimeier, Klaus. The Ufa Story: A History of Germany's Greatest Film Company, 1918-1945. University of California Press, 1999.
