= The Csardas King =

1958 film

- Directed by: Harald Philipp
- Written by: Helmuth M. Backhaus; Janne Furch; Harald Philipp; Curt Riess; Leo Stein; Hans Wilhelm
- Produced by: Artur Brauner
- Starring: Gerhard Riedmann; Rudolf Schock; Elma Karlowa
- Cinematography: Fritz Arno Wagner
- Edited by: Johanna Meisel
- Music by: Emmerich Kálmán
- Production company: CCC Film
- Distributed by: Constantin Film
- Release date: 15 August 1958
- Running time: 96 minutes
- Country: West Germany
- Language: German

The Csardas King (German: Der Czardas-König) is a 1958 West German musical film directed by Harald Philipp and starring Gerhard Riedmann, Rudolf Schock and Elma Karlowa. It is a biopic of the life of the Hungarian operetta composer Emmerich Kálmán.

The film's sets were designed by the art directors Helmut Nentwig and Heinrich Weidemann. It was shot at the Spandau Studios in Berlin and on location in Budapest. It was made in Eastmancolor.

== Cast ==
- Gerhard Riedmann as Emmerich Kálmán / Imre Kálmán
- Rudolf Schock as János
- Elma Karlowa as Ilonka
- Sabine Bethmann as Helene
- Marina Orschel as Vera
- Hubert von Meyerinck as Szegedy
- Richard Häussler as Graf Riedern
- Camilla Spira as Frau Kálmán
- Richard Allan as Stefan
- Monika Dahlberg as Rozsi
- Alice Treff as Countess Tabory
- Béla Pásztor as Béla, Zigeunerprimas
- Maly Delschaft as Hauswirtin
- Gerd Frickhöffer
- Kurt Waitzmann as Kriektor Karscak

== Bibliography ==
- Bock, Hans-Michael & Bergfelder, Tim. The Concise CineGraph. Encyclopedia of German Cinema. Berghahn Books, 2009.
