= Oberkappel =

- Municipality
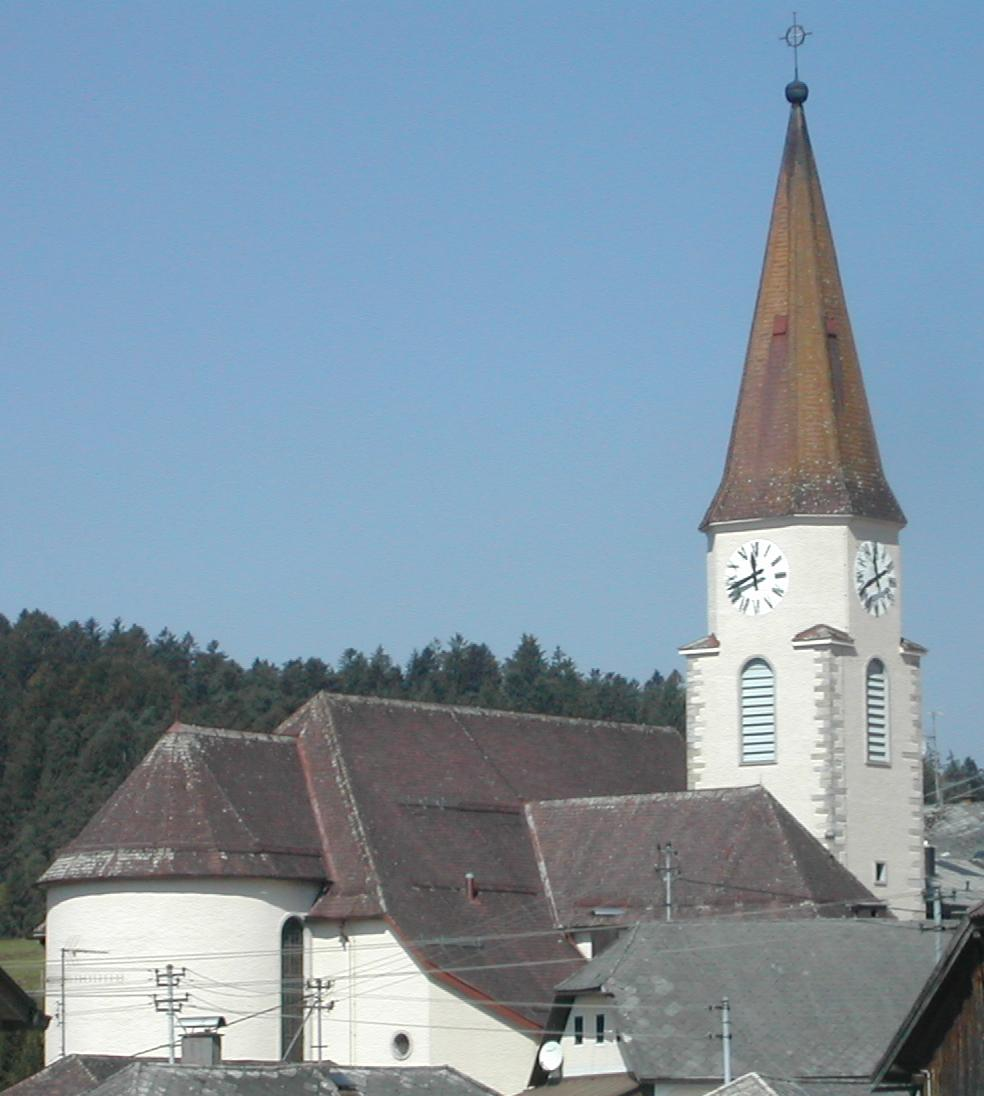

- Coat of arms

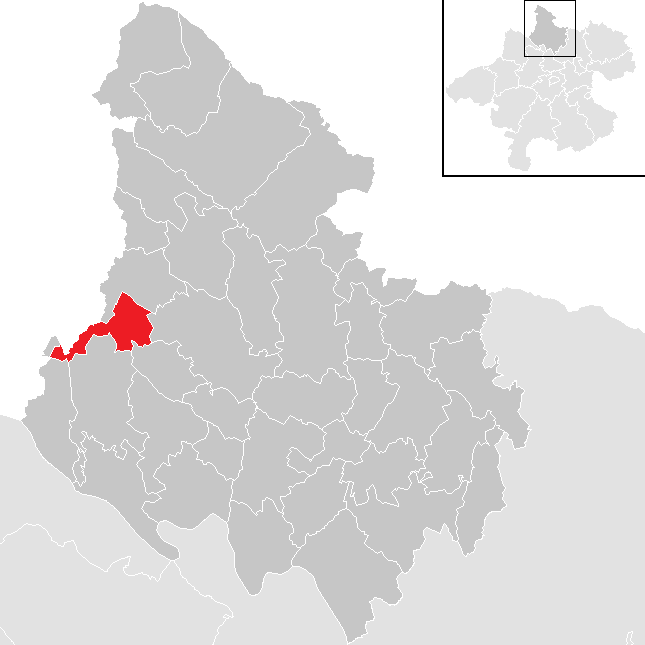
- Location in the district

- Location within Austria
- Coordinates: 48°33′11″N 13°46′17″E
- Country: Austria
- State: Upper Austria
- District: Rohrbach

Government
  - Mayor: Manuel Krenn (ÖVP)

Area
  - Total: 12.2 km^{2} (4.7 sq mi)
- Elevation: 511 m (1,677 ft)

Population (2018-01-01)
  - Total: 725
  - Density: 59.4/km^{2} (154/sq mi)
- Time zone: UTC+1 (CET)
  - Summer (DST): UTC+2 (CEST)
- Postal code: 4144
- Area code: 07284
- Vehicle registration: RO
- Website: www.oberkappel.at

Oberkappel is a municipality in the district of Rohrbach in the state of Upper Austria.

== Population ==
Historical population
Year	Pop.	±%
1869	817	—
1880	775	−5.1%
1890	778	+0.4%
1900	737	−5.3%
1910	763	+3.5%
1923	751	−1.6%
1934	698	−7.1%
1939	710	+1.7%
1951	724	+2.0%
1961	737	+1.8%
1971	736	−0.1%
1981	824	+12.0%
1991	779	−5.5%
2001	766	−1.7%
2013	733	−4.3%
2017	749	+2.2%
2021	713	−4.8%

== Geography ==
Oberkappel has an area of 12 km². The municipality is located in the north of the state of Upper Austria. It borders on Germany and is very close to the Czech Republic.

== Sports and recreation ==
The European walking routes E8 and E10 run through this place. The E8 runs from Ireland via, among others, the Netherlands (called Oeverloperpad and Lingepad in the Netherlands) through Germany, the north of Austria and Slovakia to the borders of Poland and Ukraine, and also includes a section in Bulgaria, with the future target Istanbul in Turkey. The E10 comes from Lapland and runs via Finland, the former GDR, the Czech Republic and Austria to Bozen/Bolzano in northern Italy; There are plans to extend the route via France and the Spanish east coast to Gibraltar.

== History ==
The town was originally part of the Hochstift Passau. According to the Land Registry of Rannariedl in 1581, Oberkappel belonged to the parish Wegscheid. In 1783 it became independent as a parish. During the secularization of 1803, the place with most of the Hochstiftischen area fell into the hands of Archduke Ferdinand of Tuscany and his electorate of Salzburg. The place then came to Bavaria in 1805. Oberkappel has belonged to Upper Austria since 1814 and has been a border town with Bavaria ever since. During the Third Reich, the town belonged to the Gau Oberdonau. During World War II Oberkappel was the place where Allied troops first entered Austrian territory.

== Well-known Oberkappellers ==
- Franz R. Friedl (1892–1977), composer
- Kurt Krenn (1936–2014), bishop
