= The Star of Santa Clara =

1958 film

- Directed by: Werner Jacobs
- Written by: Helmuth M. Backhaus; Ulrieke Berg; Werner Jacobs
- Produced by: Artur Brauner; Hans Raspotnik
- Starring: Vico Torriani; Gerlinde Locker; Ruth Stephan
- Cinematography: Karl Löb
- Edited by: Johanna Meisel
- Music by: Erwin Halletz
- Production company: CCC Film
- Release date: 2 October 1958
- Running time: 85 minutes
- Country: West Germany
- Language: German

The Star of Santa Clara (German: Der Stern von Santa Clara) is a 1958 West German musical comedy film directed by Werner Jacobs and starring Vico Torriani, Gerlinde Locker and Ruth Stephan. It was shot at the Spandau Studios in Berlin. The film's sets were designed by the art director Paul Markwitz.

== Cast ==
- Vico Torriani as Carlo del Ponte
- Gerlinde Locker as Antonella
- Ruth Stephan as Mitzi Underhuber
- Hubert von Meyerinck as Manager Freddy
- Brigitte Mira as Tante Theresa
- Hugo Lindinger as Bürgermeister
- Willibald Alexis as Ottone
- Harry Tagore as Mario
- Manfred Schäffer as Pancratio
- Wolfgang Neuss as Gastwirt Matteo Tartini
- Wolfgang Müller as sein Bruder Tino Tartini

== Bibliography ==
- Lutz Peter Koepnick. The Cosmopolitan Screen: German Cinema and the Global Imaginary, 1945 to the Present. University of Michigan Press, 2007.
