= Gerhard Riedmann =

Austrian actor

- Born: 24 March 1925; Vienna; Austria
- Died: 9 February 2004 (aged 78); Kematen, Tyrol; Austria
- Other name: Gerhard Anton Riedmann
- Occupation: Film actor
- Years active: 1948–1994

Gerhard Riedmann (1925–2004) was an Austrian film actor. He was married to the actress Eva Probst.

== Partial filmography ==
- Das andere Leben (1948) - (uncredited)
- Child of the Danube (1950) - Bit Part (uncredited)
- Verklungenes Wien (1951) - Max' Freund (uncredited)
- Verlorene Melodie (1952)
- 1. April 2000 (1952) - Reitender Bote (uncredited)
- Abenteuer im Schloss (1952) - Georg
- Flucht ins Schilf (1953) - Gerhard Altdorfer, Postbote
- Ich und meine Frau (1953) - Kurt Amreiner
- The Bird Seller (1953) - Adam, Vogelhändler
- The Cousin from Nowhere (1953) - Hans, ein Wanderbursche
- The Gypsy Baron (1954) - Sandor, sein Sohn
- The Beautiful Miller (1954) - Fritz Mertens
- Bruder Martin (1954) - Christian
- Espionage (1955) - Hauptmann Angelis
- Sergeant Borck (1955) - Oberwachtmeister Borck
- The Happy Village (1955) - Walter Meiners, Lehrer
- Yes, Yes, Love in Tyrol (1955) - Peter Lenz
- Love Is Just a Fairytale (1955) - Dr. Klaus Weinert
- Your Life Guards (1955) - Alexander
- Magic Fire (1956) - King Ludwig II
- Die Fischerin vom Bodensee (1956) - Hans Bruckberger
- As Long as the Roses Bloom (1956) - Michael
- The Beggar Student (1956) - Symon Rymanowicz
- Jede Nacht in einem anderen Bett (1957) - Borro Müller
- And Lead Us Not Into Temptation (1957) - Stefan von Ausberg
- Die Prinzessin von St. Wolfgang (1957) - Toni Leitner
- Hoch droben auf dem Berg (1957) - Toni Hofer
- Spring in Berlin (1957) - Ferry Meister
- The Saint and Her Fool (1957) - Harro
- ...und führe uns nicht in Versuchung (1957) - Hudetz
- The Count of Luxemburg (1957) - René, Graf von Luxemburg
- Und abends in die Scala (1958) - Robert Mertens
- Solang' die Sterne glüh'n (1958) - Conny Meister, Reporter
- Trees Are Blooming in Vienna (1958) - Erzherzog Peter Ferdinand
- The Csardas King (1958) - Emmerich Kalman / Imre Kalman
- Arena of Fear (1959) - Ruda, Raubtierdompteur
- My Daughter Patricia (1959) - Lüthi
- Liebe, Luft und lauter Lügen (1959) - Peter Brinckmann
- At Blonde Kathrein's Place (1959) - Clemens Hagen
- I'm Marrying the Director (1960) - Franz Bogner
- What Is Father Doing in Italy? (1961) - Amilare Barnabas
- Das ist die Liebe der Matrosen (1962) - Fritz Schönthal
- Waldrausch (1962) - Ambros Lutz
- Call of the Forest (1965) - Mathias
- The Pipes (1966) - Kurt
- Clint the Stranger (1967) - Bill O'Brien
- Madame Bovary (1969) - Dr. Charles Bovary
- Hubertus Castle (1973) - Lenz Bruckner
- Zwei himmlische Dickschädel (1974) - Lechner
- Waldrausch (1977) - Wohlverstand
