= Harald Paulsen =

German actor and film director

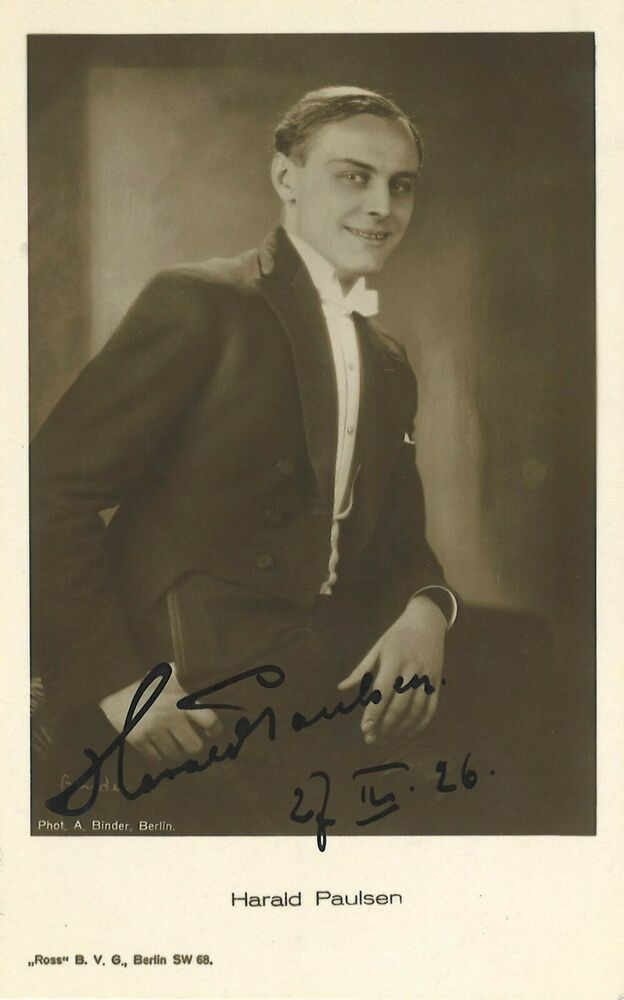
- Born: Harald Johannes David Paulsen; 26 August 1895; Elmshorn, German Empire
- Died: 4 August 1954 (aged 58); Altona, Hamburg, West Germany
- Occupations: Actor, theatre director
- Years active: 1913–1954

Harald Paulsen (26 August 1895 – 4 August 1954) was a German stage and film actor and director. He appeared in 125 films between 1920 and 1954.

== Career ==
Paulsen first appeared on stage at age sixteen. He then studied under Leopold Jessner, who was then senior director at Hamburg's Thalia Theater. He made his debut at the Hamburg Stadttheater in 1913. From 1915 until 1917, he served in the German Army during World War I. in 1917–18 he played at the Fronttheater in Mitau. In 1919 he was brought to the Deutsches Theater in Berlin by Max Reinhardt.

From his extensive theatrical work, his role as "Mackie Messer" ("Mack the Knife") in the world premiere of Bertolt Brecht's The Threepenny Opera is particularly noteworthy. This performance took place on 31 August 1928 at the Theater am Schiffbauerdamm. At that time, Paulsen was considered a Brecht admirer. In 1938 Harald Paulsen became director of the Theater am Nollendorfplatz in Berlin, where mainly operettas were performed at that time. He also directed and performed in singing roles. He was forced to resign his position in 1945, following the End of World War II in Europe. Paulsen also appeared as an actor in over twenty silent films. His acting career continued into the sound film era and he appeared in approximately ninety sound films.

Shortly after Adolf Hitler seized power, he became a fervent National Socialist and carried the Flag of Nazi Germany for the student representatives at the May Day rally in Tempelhof. He also participated as an actor in several Nazi propaganda films, such as Ohm Krüger and the pro-euthanasia film Ich klage an, both released in 1941. The Viennese actor Rolf Kutschera reported in his memoirs that Paulsen was notorious among his colleagues as an informant to Nazi authorities.

== Death ==
Harald Paulsen died on 4 August 1954, aged 58, in the general hospital in the Hamburg borough of Altona after suffering from a stroke. He was buried in the Catholic cemetery in Elmshorn. His son Uwe Paulsen (1944–2014) was a stage and film actor, cabaret artist, and prolific voice actor, who dubbed foreign language film and television into German.

== Selected filmography ==
- The Night of Queen Isabeau (1920)
- The Clan (1920)
- Ilona (1921) as Imre
- The House of Torment (1921)
- The Fateful Day (1921)
- The Men of Sybill (1923)
- The Girl from Hell (1923)
- Man Against Man (1924)
- The Humble Man and the Chanteuse (1925)
- Shadows of the Metropolis (1925) as Boxer Karl
- The Adventures of Sybil Brent (1925) as Commissioner Krenke
- Honeymoon (1928)
- Alraune (1930) as Frank Braun
- The Tender Relatives (1930) as Mr.Linsemann
- Twice Married (1930) as Wilhelm Meyer
- My Leopold (1931) as Leopold
- Storm in a Water Glass (1931) as Burdach
- One Hour of Happiness (1931) as Tommy
- The Song of Life (1931) as Singer
- The Trunks of Mr. O.F. (1931) as Stark the architect
- Unheimliche Geschichten (1932)
- The Importance of Being Earnest (1932)
- The Big Bluff (1933) as Harry Neuhoff
- The Little Crook (1933) as Lord Bob
- A Thousand for One Night (1933) as Frank Wellner
- The Daring Swimmer (1934) as Fritz Neubauer
- The Valiant Navigator (1935) as Otto Jebs
- A Girl Whirls By the World (1934) as Paul Martens
- Fresh Wind from Canada (1935) as Jonny
- Artist Love (1935) as Count Hohenstein
- Stradivari (1935)
- Make Me Happy (1935) as Henry Davenport
- She and the Three (1935) as Peter Hüsing
- Ave Maria (1936)
- The Dreamer (1936) as Fritz
- If We All Were Angels (1936) as Enrico Falotti
- The Hour of Temptation (1936)
- Escapade (1936)
- Signal in the Night (1937)
- The Ruler (1937)
- The Holm Murder Case (1938)
- Shadows Over St. Pauli (1938)
- The Marriage Swindler (1938)
- The Secret Lie (1938)
- We Danced Around the World (1939)
- Renate in the Quartet (1939)
- Bismarck (1940) as Benedetti
- The Three Codonas (1940)
- What Does Brigitte Want? (1941)
- Ohm Krüger (1941) as the French foreign minister
- The Thing About Styx (1942) as Dr. Bonnett
- The Night in Venice (1942)
- Beloved Darling (1943)
- A Flea in Her Ear (1943)
- An Old Heart Becomes Young Again (1943)
- The Golden Spider (1943) as Smirnoff / Agent Petersen
- The Court Concert (1948) as Councillor Zunder
- Search for Majora (1949) as Harry
- The Appeal to Conscience (1949) as Korfiz
- My Niece Susanne (1950) as Jean
- The Rabanser Case (1950)
- Thirteen Under One Hat (1950) as Otto Bollmann
- Professor Nachtfalter (1951)
- The Deadly Dreams (1951) as Magier / Rodriguez / Olivier
- Sensation in San Remo (1951)
- The Lady in Black (1951)
- Desires (1952)
- Oh, You Dear Fridolin (1952)
- Three Days of Fear (1952)
- Weekend in Paradise (1952)
- Once on the Rhine (1952)
- Klettermaxe (1952)
- A Very Big Child (1952)
- The Bogeyman (1953)
- The Little Town Will Go to Sleep (1954)
- The Faithful Hussar (1954)
- The Gypsy Baron (1954)
- The Beautiful Miller (1954)
