= All Roads Lead Home (1957 film) =

1957 film

- Directed by: Hans Deppe
- Written by: Jacob Geis; Juliane Kay
- Produced by: Hans Deppe; Johannes J. Frank; Wilhelm Gernhardt
- Starring: Luise Ullrich; Christian Doermer; Fritz Tillmann
- Cinematography: Werner M. Lenz
- Edited by: Johanna Meisel
- Music by: Bernhard Kaun
- Production companies: Hans Deppe Film; Bavaria Film
- Distributed by: Schorcht Filmverleih
- Release date: 31 October 1957
- Running time: 99 minutes
- Country: West Germany
- Language: German

All Roads Lead Home (German: Alle Wege führen heim) is a 1957 West German drama film directed by Hans Deppe and starring Luise Ullrich, Christian Doermer and Fritz Tillmann. The film was made at the Bavaria Studios in Munich. The film's sets were designed by the art directors Willi Herrmann and Heinrich Weidemann. It was shot using Agfacolor.

== Cast ==
- Luise Ullrich as Tilla Haidt
- Christian Doermer as Michael
- Fritz Tillmann as Dr. Jacobs
- Günther Lüders as Father Nehlsen
- Helmut Schmid as Autohändler Busch
- Lotte Brackebusch as Marie
- Sabine Hahn as Antje
- Sylvia Bossert as Irene
- Franz Schafheitlin as Grumke
- Georg Kostya as Kurt
- Alexander von Richthofen as Jochen
- Joseph Offenbach as Amtsschreiber
- Karl-Heinz Peters as Toboggan-Besitzer

== Bibliography ==
- Willi Höfig. Der deutsche Heimatfilm 1947–1960. F. Enke, 1973.
