= The Dubarry (film) =

1951 film

- Directed by: Georg Wildhagen; Reinhold Schünzel
- Written by: Paul Knepler (libretto); F. Zell (libretto); Franz Gribitz; Georg Wildhagen
- Produced by: Franz Tappers
- Starring: Sari Barabas; Willy Fritsch; Albert Lieven
- Cinematography: Willy Winterstein
- Edited by: Alice Ludwig
- Music by: Theo Mackeben
- Production companies: Fama-Film; Standard-Filmverleih
- Distributed by: Europa-Filmverleih
- Release date: 30 November 1951
- Running time: 99 minutes
- Country: West Germany
- Language: German

The Dubarry (German: Die Dubarry) is a 1951 German musical film directed by Georg Wildhagen and Reinhold Schünzel and starring Sari Barabas, Willy Fritsch and Albert Lieven. It is named after the operetta Die Dubarry, but uses the work only as a background. It was made at the Wandsbek Studios in Hamburg. The film's sets were designed by the art directors Willi Herrmann and Heinrich Weidemann.

== Synopsis ==
Jeanne Fabian is a singer celebrated for her role as Madame Dubarry, but her financial backing from a wealthy admirer leads to criticism. She decides to change her name and look and start again from her beginnings to prove she really is talented. She falls in love with a man she takes to be poor, but is in fact a wealthy car manufacturer.

== Cast ==
- Sari Barabas as Jeanne Fabiani / Madame Dubarry
- Willy Fritsch as Louis Valmont
- Albert Lieven as Alfred Collien
- Walter Müller as Cäsar Schnepf
- Eva Ingeborg Scholz as Kitty Lenz
- Inge Meysel as Charlotte Adrian, Pensionsinhaberin
- Loni Heuser as Lola Violetta
- Madelon Truß as Fifi, Fotomodell
- Lorley Katz
- Hubert von Meyerinck as Stranitzky, Schmierendirektor
- Ernst Waldow as Erban, Theaterdirektor
- Fritz Imhoff as Schaubitzer, Theateragent
- Carl-Heinz Schroth as Scharlakan
- Helmuth Rudolph as Dr. Steffens, Kritiker
- Hans Heinz Bollmann as Orgass, Agent
- Joachim Teege as Alphonse Meyer, Fotograf
- Mathieu Ahlersmeyer as König
- Alexander Hunzinger
- Herbert Ernst Groh

== Bibliography ==
- Kurt Gänzl. The Encyclopedia of the Musical Theatre: A-Gi. Schirmer Books, 2001.
