= Erich Holder =

German film producer

- Born: 21 March 1901; Berlin, German Empire
- Died: 3 December 1974 (aged 73); Hamburg, West Germany
- Occupation: Film producer
- Years active: 1927-1962 (film & TV)

Erich Holder (1901–1974) was a German film producer active for several decades, including the Nazi era. He was also employed as a production manager. Amongst the films he worked on were the anti-American crime film The Sensational Casilla Trial in 1939. He also co-directed one film, the 1935 production Fresh Wind from Canada .

== Selected filmography ==
- Fresh Wind from Canada (1935)
- The Sensational Casilla Trial (1939)
- Between Heaven and Earth (1942)
- Immensee (1943)
- The Wedding Hotel (1944)
- How Do We Tell Our Children? (1944)
- A Cheerful House (1944)
- Where the Trains Go (1949)
- Eyes of Love (1951)
- The Colourful Dream (1952)
- The Beautiful Miller (1954)
- The Faithful Hussar (1954)

== Bibliography ==
- Giesen, Rolf. Nazi Propaganda Films: A History and Filmography. McFarland & Company, 2003.
- Goble, Alan. The Complete Index to Literary Sources in Film. Walter de Gruyter, 1999.
