= Margarete Steinborn =

German film editor (1893–1957)

- Born: 29 June 1893; Berlin, German Empire
- Died: 15 July 1957 (aged 64); West Berlin, West Germany
- Occupation: Editor
- Years active: 1934–1956 (film )

Margarete Steinborn (1893–1957) was a German film editor.

== Selected filmography ==
- A Night on the Danube (1935)
- The Unfaithful Eckehart (1940)
- Der Herr im Haus (1940)
- Alarm (1941)
- A Man for My Wife (1943)
- A Waltz with You (1943)
- The Master Detective (1944)
- Free Land (1946)
- One Night Apart (1950)
- The Black Forest Girl (1950)
- Immortal Beloved (1951)
- At the Well in Front of the Gate (1952)
- Mikosch Comes In (1952)
- The Land of Smiles (1952)
- Josef the Chaste (1953)
- When The Village Music Plays on Sunday Nights (1953)
- The Gypsy Baron (1954)
- The Faithful Hussar (1954)
- The Happy Village (1955)
- The Beautiful Master (1956)

== Bibliography ==
- Hans-Michael Bock & Michael Töteberg. Das Ufa-Buch. Zweitausendeins, 1992.
