= Vico Torriani =

Swiss actor and singer (1920–1998)

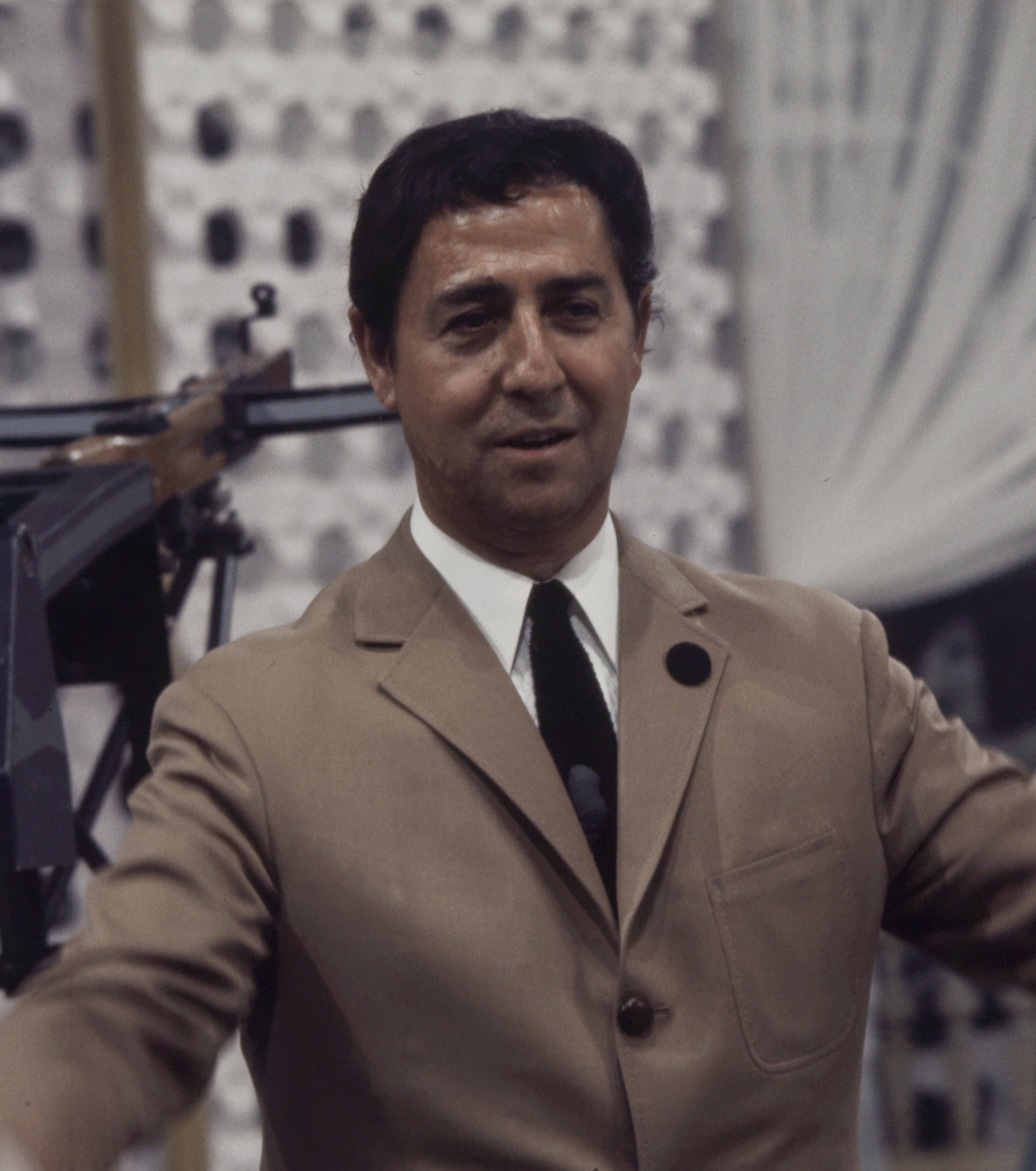
- Torriani in 1969
- Born: Ludovico Oxens Torriani; 21 September 1920; Geneva, Switzerland
- Died: 25 February 1998 (aged 77); Agno, Switzerland
- Occupations: Actor, singer
- Years active: 1945–1995
- Spouse: Evelyne Torriani-Güntert (1952–1998)

Ludovico Oxens Torriani (21 September 1920 – 25 February 1998) was a Swiss actor and Schlager singer.

== Biography ==
Born in Geneva to a family of Lombard origin, Torriani grew up in St. Moritz where he trained as a cook and pastry chef, already making appearances as a singer. He later opened a restaurant in Basel and wrote cookbooks. After winning a talent competition in 1945, he toured several West European countries and in 1949 entered the Swiss charts, followed by his breakthrough in West Germany in 1951. The next year he made his debut on Swiss television, then also on the German ARD network, where he hosted several TV shows with numerous guest stars.

In the 1950s and 1960s he also appeared as an actor in musical films, operettas and musical theatre. He competed to represent Germany in the Eurovision Song Contest 1958. From 1967 he succeeded Lou van Burg hosting the TV show Der goldene Schuß on the West German ZDF network, until the production ended in 1970. In the 1970s he attained further success with Schlager and Volkstümliche Musik songs. He received a Bambi lifetime achievement award in 1995.

== Selected filmography ==
- My Wife Is Being Stupid (1952)
- Street Serenade (1953)
- Guitars of Love (1954)
- A Heart Full of Music (1955)
- Santa Lucia (1956)
- The Tour Guide of Lisbon (1956)
- The Star of Santa Clara (1958)
- Robert and Bertram (1961)
- I Must Go to the City (1962)
