= Jeanette Schultze =

German actress

- Born: 4 September 1931; Leipzig, Germany
- Died: 3 October 1972 (aged 41)
- Occupation: Actress
- Years active: 1949–1957
- Spouse: Albert Hehn

Jeanette Schultze (1931–1972) was a German film actress. She played leading roles in a number of post-war Austrian and West German films such as Martina (1949) and A Night in Venice (1953). Several of her appearances were in operetta films. She was married to the actor Albert Hehn.

== Selected filmography ==
- Martina (1949)
- The Bridge (1949)
- Anonymous Letters (1949)
- The Orplid Mystery (1950)
- Scandal at the Embassy (1950)
- When Men Cheat (1950)
- The Csardas Princess (1951)
- Queen of the Night (1951)
- Professor Nachtfalter (1951)
- Ideal Woman Sought (1952)
- A Night in Venice (1953)
- Red Roses, Red Lips, Red Wine (1953)
- Island of the Dead (1955)

== Bibliography ==
- Goble, Alan. The Complete Index to Literary Sources in Film. Walter de Gruyter, 1999.
