= The Tour Guide of Lisbon =

1956 film

- Directed by: Hans Deppe
- Written by: Werner Eplinius; Janne Furch; Hanns H. Fischer; Lore Stapenhorst
- Produced by: Hans Deppe; Wilhelm Gernhardt; Fernando Macedo; Almeida Santos; Leão Spiguel
- Starring: Vico Torriani; Inge Egger; Gunnar Möller
- Cinematography: Willy Winterstein
- Edited by: Johanna Meisel
- Music by: Erwin Halletz
- Production company: Hans Deppe Film
- Distributed by: Neue Filmverleih
- Release date: 28 December 1956
- Running time: 97 minutes
- Country: West Germany
- Language: German

The Tour Guide of Lisbon (German: Der Fremdenführer von Lissabon) is a 1956 West German musical comedy film directed by Hans Deppe and starring Vico Torriani, Inge Egger, and Gunnar Möller.

The film's sets were designed by the art directors Willi Herrmann and Heinrich Weidemann. It was shot at the Spandau Studios in Berlin and on location in Lisbon.

== Cast ==
- Vico Torriani as Antonio Duarte, Tour Guide
- Inge Egger as Claudia Bronner, Swiss Detective
- Gunnar Möller as Sebastian, Art Painter
- Mara Lane as Mercedes Gonzales, Argentinian Tourist
- Mady Rahl as Baroness Karaczyl
- Paul Henckels as Jeronimo Duarte, Antonio's Father
- Annie Rosar as Rosa Duarte, Cook
- Alice Treff as Miss von Hornstein
- Edward Tierney as Bill, Bus Driver
- Helga Frank as Blonde Tourist
- Barbara Saade as Black Haired Tourist
- Winnifred Bosboom as Black Haired Tourist
- Rolf Weih as Baroness's Suitor
- Stanislav Ledinek as Mr. Gonzales Draenst
- Wolfgang Harnisch Jr. as Jewellery Shop Attendant

== Bibliography ==
- Bock, Hans-Michael; Bergfelder, Tim, eds. (2009). The Concise Cinegraph: Encyclopaedia of German Cinema. New York: Berghahn Books. ISBN 978-1-57181-655-9.
