= The Gypsy Baron (1954 film) =

1954 film directed by Arthur Maria Rabenalt

- Film poster
- German: Der Zigeunerbaron
- Directed by: Arthur Maria Rabenalt
- Written by: Ignaz Schnitzer (libretto); Curt J. Braun
- Based on: A cigánybáró by Mór Jókai
- Produced by: Kurt Ulrich
- Starring: Paul Hörbiger; Gerhard Riedmann; Margit Saad
- Cinematography: Kurt Schultz
- Edited by: Margarete Steinborn
- Music by: Johann Strauss II (operetta)
- Production company: Berolina Film
- Distributed by: Herzog-Filmverleih
- Release date: 31 August 1954
- Running time: 105 minutes
- Country: West Germany
- Language: German

The Gypsy Baron (German: Der Zigeunerbaron) is a 1954 West German operetta film directed by Arthur Maria Rabenalt and starring Paul Hörbiger, Gerhard Riedmann and Margit Saad. It is an adaptation of the 1885 operetta A cigánybáró by Mór Jókai.

It was shot at the Tempelhof Studios in Berlin and on location in various places in Yugoslavia including Belgrade and Sarajevo. The film's sets were designed by Willi Herrmann, Paul Markwitz, Peter Schlewski and Heinrich Weidemann.

== Cast ==
- Paul Hörbiger as Barinkay
- Gerhard Riedmann as Sandor
- Margit Saad as Saffi
- Karl Schönböck as Colonel Homonay
- Oskar Sima as Kalman Zsupan
- Maria Sebaldt as Arsena
- Peer Schmidt as Ottokar
- Harald Paulsen as Count Carnero
- Karl Finkenzeller as Janos
- Trude Hesterberg as Zipra
- Gert Kollat as emigrant
- Waltraut Haas as Empress Maria Theresa
