= Milo Harbich =

- Born: 13 August 1900; Porto Alegre, Rio Grande do Sul, First Brazilian Republic
- Died: 13 September 1988 (aged 88); Nova Petrópolis, Rio Grande do Sul, Brazil
- Occupations: Editor, director
- Years active: 1933–1962

Milo Harbich (13 August 1900 – 13 September 1988) was a Brazilian-born German film editor and director. He was born to Austrian-Brazilian parents who moved to Dresden when he was a small child. He began career as stage actor, but by the early 1930s was increasingly involved with the German film industry. He edited his first film in 1933. During the Nazi era he worked on a mixture of propaganda films and less overtly political entertainment such as To New Shores (1937) and the Marika Rökk vehicle Hello Janine! (1939). He often worked with the directors Douglas Sirk and Hans Steinhoff.

After having previously made a couple of short films, Harbich directed Commissioner Eyck his first feature film in 1940.

In 1946 he directed Free Land for DEFA in East Germany. The following year he returned to his native Brazil where he continued to work on films intermittently until the early 1960s.

== Selected filmography ==
=== Editor ===
- Inge and the Millions (1933)
- What Men Know (1933)
- Today Is the Day (1933)
- Love Must Be Understood (1933)
- Enjoy Yourselves (1934)
- Just Once a Great Lady (1934)
- The Higher Command (1935)
- The Gypsy Baron (1935)
- One Too Many on Board (1935)
- To New Shores (1937)
- Men Without a Fatherland (1937)
- Northern Lights (1938)
- Hello Janine! (1939)
- Man for Man (1939)

=== Director ===
- Commissioner Eyck (1940)
- Free Land (1946)

== Bibliography ==
- Feinstein, Joshua. The Triumph of the Ordinary: Depictions of Daily Life in the East German Cinema, 1949-1989. University of North Carolina Press, 2002.
