= Free Land (film) =

1946 film

- Film poster
- Directed by: Milo Harbich
- Written by: Kurt Hahne (play); Milo Harbich
- Starring: Ursula Voß; Fritz Wagner; Herbert Wilk; Hans Sternberg
- Cinematography: Otto Baecker
- Edited by: Margarete Steinborn
- Music by: Werner Eisbrenner
- Production company: DEFA
- Distributed by: Sovexport-Film
- Release date: 18 October 1946
- Running time: 94 minutes
- Countries: Germany; (Soviet sector)
- Language: German

Free Land (German: Freies Land) is a 1946 German drama film directed by Milo Harbich and starring Ursula Voß, Fritz Wagner and Herbert Wilk. The film was a work of propaganda made by DEFA in the Soviet occupation zone which later became East Germany. It uses a neorealist style to portray the effects of land reforms brought in by the Soviet authorities. It proved to be very unsuccessful on its release.

== Cast ==
- Ursula Voß as Frau Jeruscheit
- Fritz Wagner as Neubauer Jeruscheit
- Herbert Wilk as Bürgermeister Siebold
- Hans Sternberg as Altbauer Strunk
- Aribert Grimmer as Altbauer Melzig
- Peter Marx as Altbauer Schulzke
- Oskar Höcker as Neubauer Kubinski
- Elfie Dugal as Küchenmädchen
- Kurt Mikulski as Siedler
- Karl Platen
- Hans Ulrich
- Albert Arid

== Bibliography ==
- Feinstein, Joshua. The Triumph of the Ordinary: Depictions of Daily Life in the East German Cinema, 1949–1989. University of North Carolina Press, 2002.
- Noack, Frank. Veit Harlan: The Life and Work of a Nazi Filmmaker. University Press of Kentucky, 2016.
