= Zugverkehr unregelmäßig =

1951 film

- Directed by: Erich Freund
- Written by: Peter Bejach
- Produced by: DEFA
- Starring: Claus Holm; Inge Keller; Hanns Groth; Peter Lehmbrock; Brigitte Krause; Horst Drinda; Evamaria Bath; Margarete Kupfer; Werner Pledath; Albert Venohr; Heinz Scholz; Theo Shall; Hans Schoelermann; Fred Kronström; Annemarie Hase; Hans-Edgar Stecher; Nico Turoff; Hermann Stetza; Frank Michelis; Egon Vogel
- Narrated by: Hermann Turowski
- Cinematography: Willi Kuhle
- Edited by: Ferdinand Weintraub
- Music by: Franz R. Friedl
- Distributed by: DDRDEFA
- Release date: 1951
- Running time: 82 Minutes
- Country: East Germany
- Language: German

Zugverkehr unregelmäßig is an East German film. It was released in 1951.

== Literature ==
- Frank-Burkhard Habel: Das große Lexikon der DEFA-Spielfilme. Schwarzkopf & Schwarzkopf, Berlin 2000, ISBN 3-89602-349-7, pp. 710–711.
