= Mikosch Comes In (1952 film) =

1952 film

- Directed by: Johann Alexander Hübler-Kahla
- Written by: Bobby E. Lüthge
- Produced by: Kurt Ulrich
- Starring: Georg Thomalla; Willy Fritsch; Paul Hörbiger
- Cinematography: Kurt Schulz
- Edited by: Margarete Steinborn
- Music by: Michael Jary
- Production company: Berolina Film
- Distributed by: Herzog Film
- Release date: 9 October 1952
- Running time: 101 minutes
- Country: West Germany
- Language: German

Mikosch Comes In (German: Mikosch rückt ein) is a 1952 West German comedy film directed by Johann Alexander Hübler-Kahla and starring Georg Thomalla, Willy Fritsch and Paul Hörbiger. It was shot at the Tempelhof Studios in West Berlin. The film's sets were designed by the art directors Willi A. Herrmann and Heinrich Weidemann.

== Cast ==
- Georg Thomalla as Janos Nawratil
- Willy Fritsch as Oberst von Körömsbös
- Paul Hörbiger as Dr. Paliwec
- Oskar Sima as Baron Mikosch
- Heli Finkenzeller as Claire von Ferency
- Paul Klinger as Tibor von Köröd
- Christiane Jansen as Margit von Ferency
- Ludwig Schmitz as Turmwurzel, Oberkellner
- Franz-Otto Krüger as Fotograf
- Kurt Pratsch-Kaufmann as Feldwebel Janos
- Bruno Fritz as Major von Itzenblitz
- Wolfgang Dohnberg as Oberleutnant von Bredow
- Gerd Frickhöffer as Leutnant von Kitzewitz
- Walter Gross as Fritz Pickelmann, Bursche
- Franz Arzdorf as Oberleutnant Graf Bobby
- Joe Furtner as Dorfpfarrer
- Wolfgang Neuss as Franzek
- Lucie Englisch as Erzy, Schweinemagd
- Peter Paul Richter as Karoli, Bursche
- Bruno W. Pantel as Eugen
- Friedl Hardt as Dancer

== Bibliography ==
- Hans-Michael Bock and Tim Bergfelder. The Concise Cinegraph: An Encyclopedia of German Cinema. Berghahn Books, 2009.
