= Günter Pfitzmann =

German actor (1924–2003)

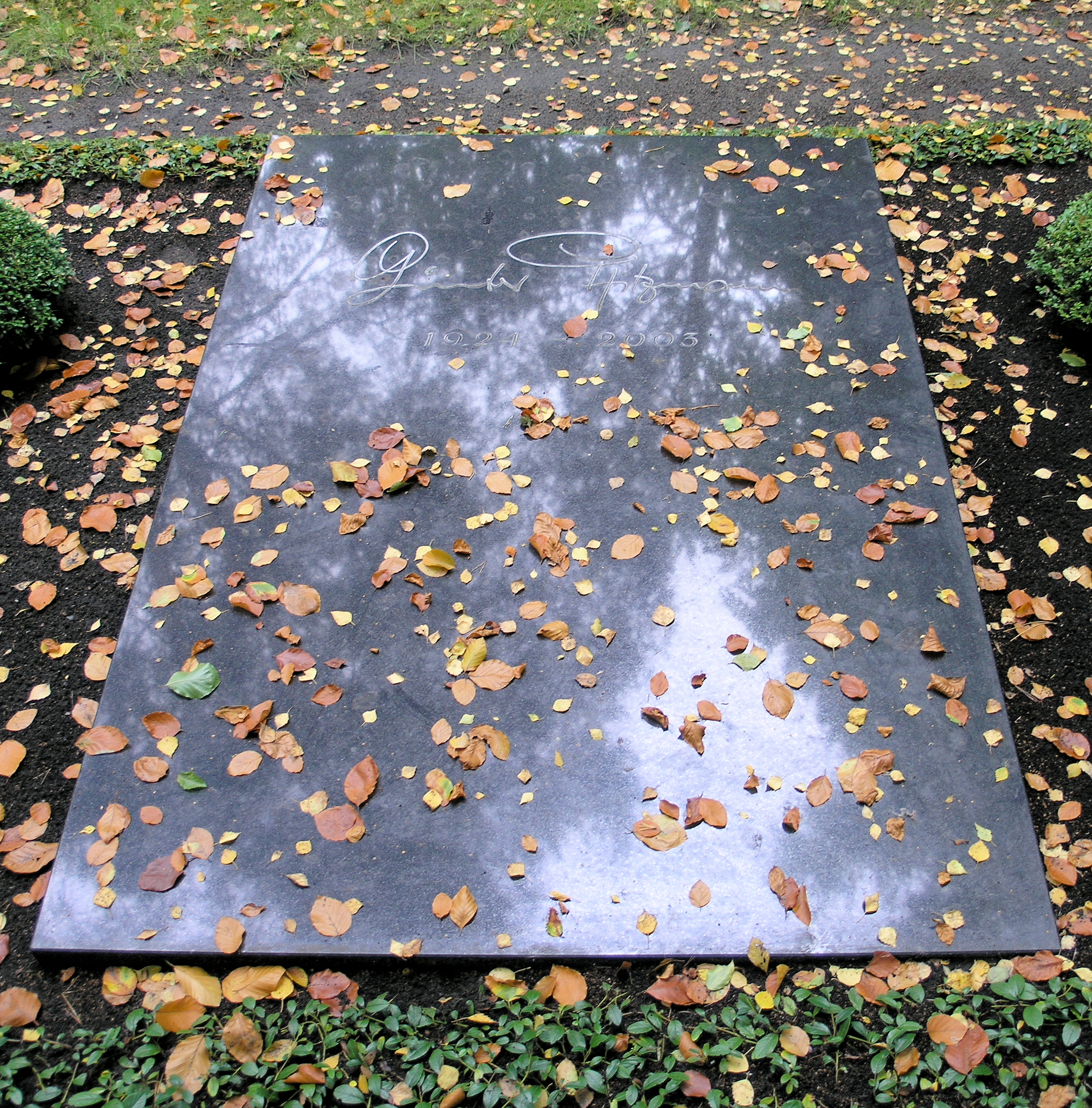
- Pfitzmann's grave at the Waldfriedhof Zehlendorf in Nikolassee
- Born: 8 April 1924; Berlin, Germany
- Died: 30 May 2003 (aged 79); Berlin, Germany
- Occupation: Actor
- Years active: 1950–2002
- Known for: German dubbing voice for Kirk Douglas and playing Dr. Brockmann in Praxis Bülowbogen
- Spouse: Lilo Giebken (Pfitzmann's 2nd marriage)
- Children: 2

Günter Pfitzmann (8 April 1924 – 30 May 2003) was a German film actor who appeared in more than 60 films between 1950 and 2001.

He narrowly escaped death due to heart problems which lead to him cancelling his seat aboard Concorde flight AF4590, which crashed in Paris on 25 July 2000.

== Selected filmography ==
- Only One Night (1950)
- All Clues Lead to Berlin (1952)
- Emil and the Detectives (1954)
- The Captain and His Hero (1955), as Hauptmann Roeder
- Sergeant Borck (1955), as Wachtmeister Heinz Ohlsen
- Your Life Guards (1955), as Charly
- Siebenmal in der Woche (1957), as Policeman
- Heart Without Mercy (1958), as Dr. Knoll
- Doctor Crippen Lives (1958), as Kriminalassistent Pierre
- Taiga (1958), as Dickmann
- I'll Carry You in My Arms (1958), as Georg
- Nick Knatterton’s Adventure (1959), as Max
- Stalingrad: Dogs, Do You Want to Live Forever? (1959), as Kunowski
- Die Brücke (1959), as Unteroffizier Heilmann
- Abschied von den Wolken (1959), as Howard Sims
- Triplets on Board (1959), as Mac
- Darkness Fell on Gotenhafen (1960), as Oberleutnant Dankel
- Am grünen Strand der Spree (1960, TV miniseries), as Bob Arnoldis
- Heldinnen (1960), as Werner
- Die Brücke des Schicksals (1960), as Frank Mossdorf
- Always Trouble with the Bed (1961), as Peter Schulze
- The Miracle of Father Malachia (1961), as Rudolf Reuschel
- Auf Wiedersehen (1961), as Willi Kuhlke
- Gestatten, mein Name ist Cox (1961–1965; leading role in TV series), as Paul Cox
- The Phone Rings Every Night (1962), as Robert Bullinger
- The Squeaker (1963), as Frankie Sutton
- Wilhelmina (1968; leading role in TV miniseries), as Georg
- Das Kriminalmuseum: Die Postanweisung (1968, TV series episode), as Kommissar Marquardt
- Die Unverbesserlichen (1970–1971; TV series), as Jürgen Hechler
- The Captain (1971), as Oldenburg
- Der Nervtöter (1973; leading role in TV series), as Herr Linderode
- PS (1975; leading role in TV series), as Jochen Neubert
- Dear Fatherland Be at Peace (1976), as Prangel
- Sladek oder Die schwarze Armee (1976, TV film), as Knorke
- Tatort: Feuerzauber (1977; TV series), as K. F. Kastrup
- Drei Damen vom Grill (1977–1986; leading role in TV series), as Otto Krüger
- Ein Mann will nach oben (1978, TV series), as Mr. Kalubrigkeit
- Why the UFOs Steal Our Lettuce (1980), as Consul Meier
- Berliner Weiße mit Schuß (1984–1995; leading role in TV series)
- Praxis Bülowbogen (1987–1996; leading role in TV series), as Dr. Brockmann
- Der Millionenerbe (1990–1993; leading role in TV series), as Johannes Redlich
- Der Havelkaiser (1994–2000; leading role in TV series), as Richard Kaiser
- Letzte Chance für Harry (1998; TV film), as Simon Spradow
- Das Traumschiff: Bali (1999; TV series), as Alfred Sander
- Die Meute der Erben (2001; TV film), as Arno Adelmann
- In aller Freundschaft (2002; TV series, one episode), as Theo Köckritz
