= Wolfgang Neuss =

German actor and Kabarett artist (1923–1989)

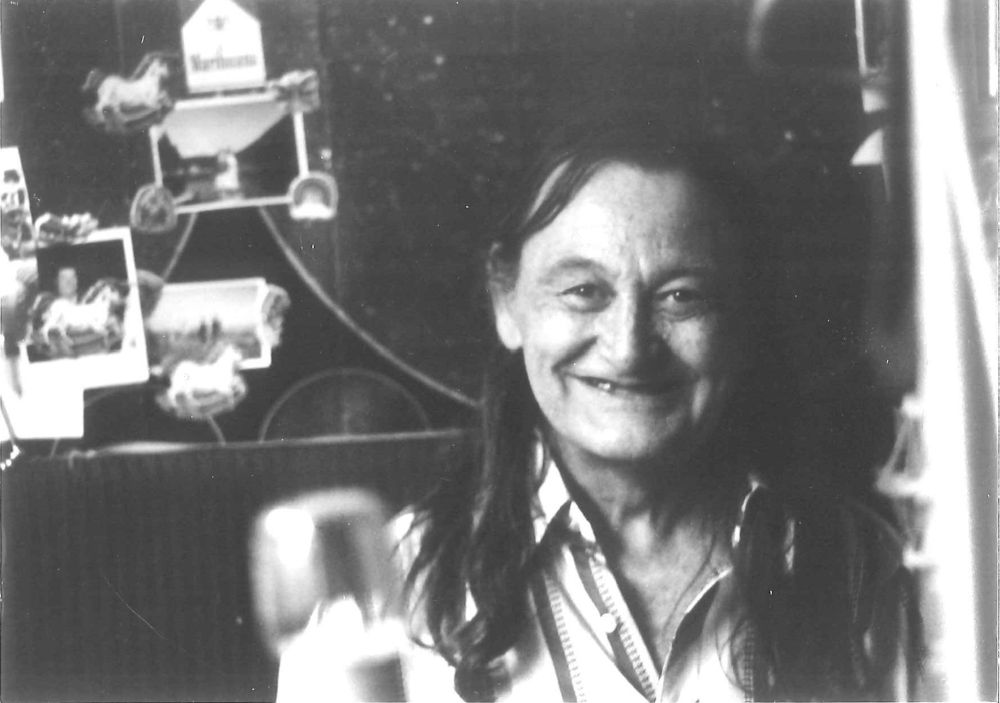
- Neuss in 1985
- Born: Hans Wolfgang Otto Neuß; 3 December 1923; Breslau, Germany
- Died: 5 May 1989 (aged 65); West Berlin, West Germany
- Occupations: Actor, Kabarett artist

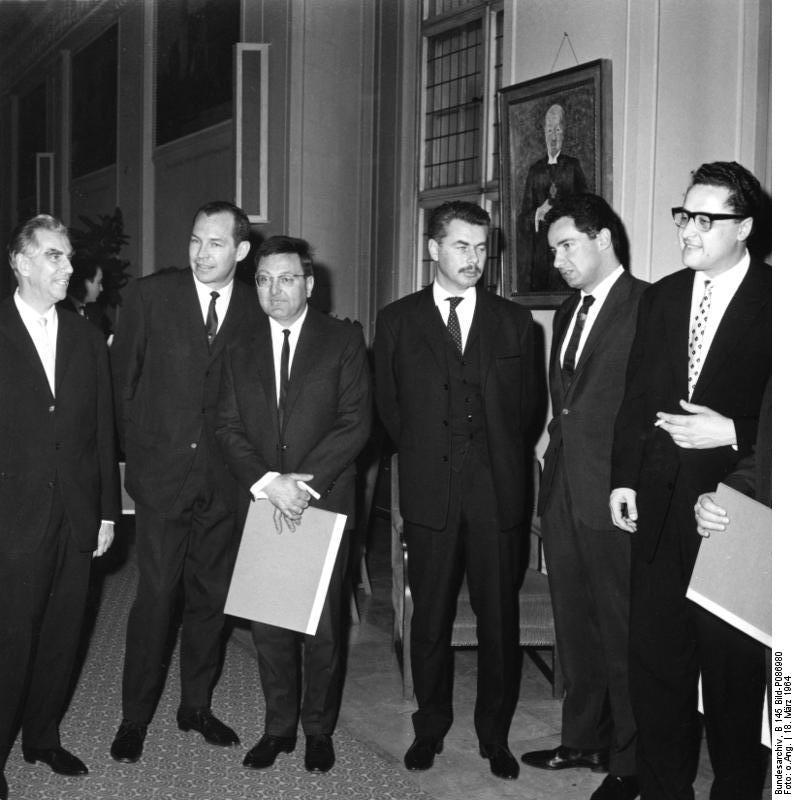
Wolfgang Neuss (third from left) receiving the award of the Berliner Kunstpreis für Film und Fernsehen (1964)

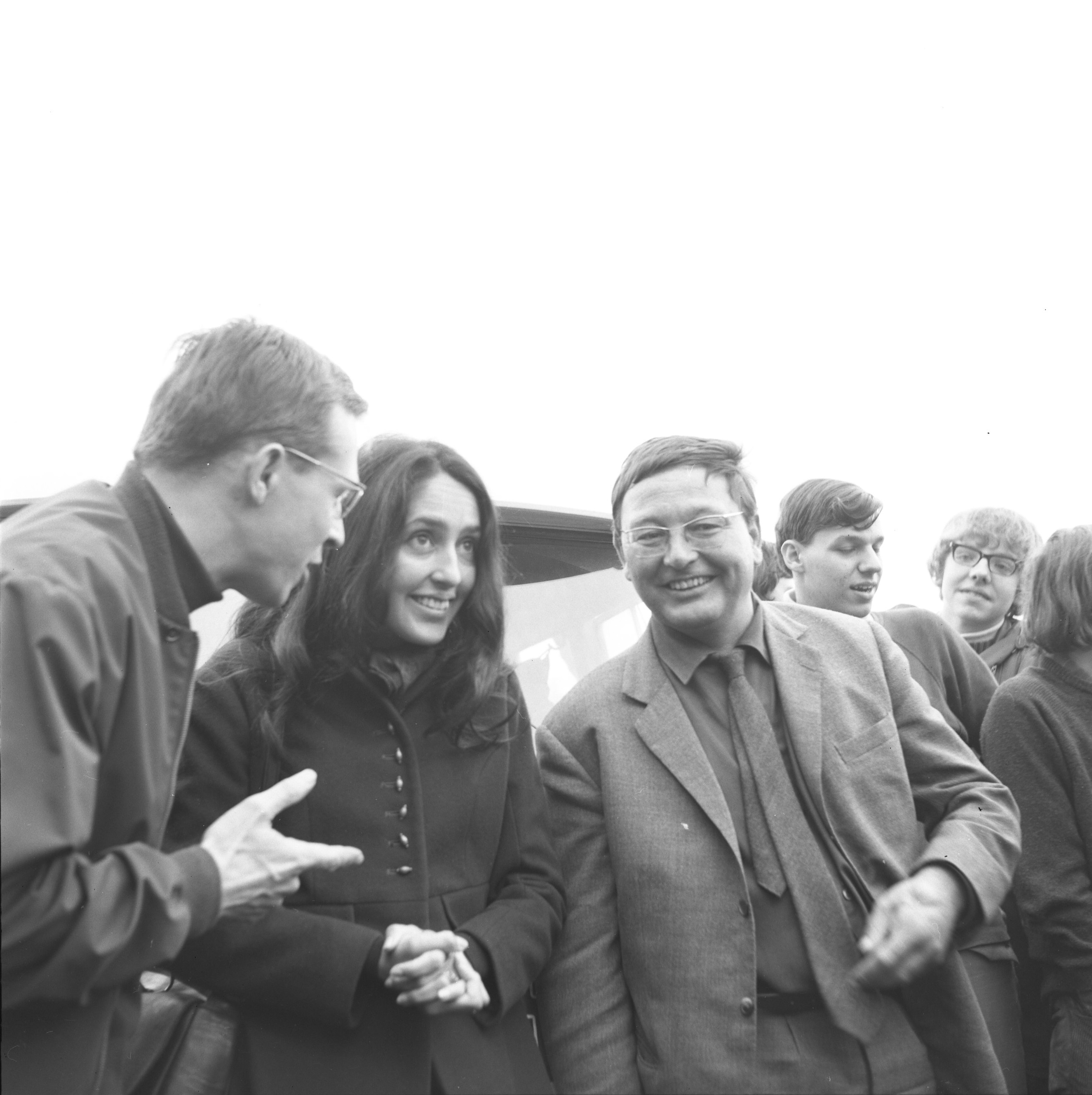
Wolfgang Neuss, next to Joan Baez, at the “Ostermarsch”, April 1966 in Frankfurt

Wolfgang Neuss (3 December 1923 – 5 May 1989) was a German actor and Kabarett artist. Wolfgang Neuss and Wolfgang Müller (1922–1960) were a popular double act. Beginning in the mid-1960s, Neuss also became famous for his political engagement, first for the SPD, then for the extra-parliamentary opposition, APO. He died in 1989 from a longtime cancer.

At the age of 15 he went to Berlin to become a clown but was dismissed. When Germany entered into the Second World War Neuss was drafted, first to the Reich Labour Service where he was occupied with road construction. Later he was sent to the Eastern Front where he became injured and was rewarded with the Iron Cross. It was during his stays in military hospitals and, after the war during military detention that Neuss began to discover his interest in acting and for Kabarett.

== Filmography ==
- Der Mann, der sich selber sucht (The man in search of himself) (1950)
- Wer fuhr den grauen Ford? (Who drove the grey Ford?) (1950) as Uwe Lauterbach
- Schön muß man sein (You have to be beautiful) (1951) as Moritat singer
- Pension Schöller (1952) as Ballman
- Mikosch rückt ein (Mikosch comes in) (1952) as Franzek
- Ich hab' mein Herz in Heidelberg verloren (I lost my heart in Heidelberg) (1952) as Karl
- Man lebt nur einmal (You only live once) (1952) as boxer Willy
- Die Spur führt nach Berlin (All clues lead to Berlin) (1952) as Martin
- Der Onkel aus Amerika (The uncle from America) (1953) as conferencier
- Von Liebe reden wir später (We'll talk about love later) (1953) as detective Leonhard Pingel
- Hollandmädel (Dutch girl) (1953) as Mr. Zimt
- Keine Angst vor großen Tieren (Not afraid of big animals) (1953) as magician
- Die Kaiserin von China (The empress of China) (1953) as Wonderful
- Weg ohne Umkehr (No way back) (1953) as comedian
- Hurra – ein Junge! (Hooray, it's a boy!) (1953)
- Auf der Reeperbahn nachts um halb eins (On the Reeperbahn at half past midnight) (1954) as Nigrantz
- Phantom des großen Zeltes (The phantom of the big tent) (1954)
- Die schöne Müllerin (The beautiful miller) (1954)
- Die goldene Pest (The golden plague) (1954)
- Des Teufels General (The devil's general) (1955) as police photographer
- Ein Mann vergißt die Liebe (1955)
- Die heilige Lüge (Sacred lie) (1955)
- Oberwachtmeister Borck (Sergeant Borck) (1955) as Krüger
- Ich war ein häßliches Mädchen (I was an ugly girl) (1955) as journalist Mopp
- Banditen der Autobahn (Bandits of the Autobahn) (1955) as chansonnier
- Der fröhliche Wanderer (The happy wanderer) (1955) as director Kneppke
- Unternehmen Schlafsack (Operation sleeping bag) (1955) as Hauptmann Z.
- Mein Leopold (My Leopold) (1955) as Charly
- Himmel ohne Sterne (Sky without stars) (1955) as Vopo Edgar Bröse
- Die Drei von der Tankstelle (The three from the filling station) (1955) as Prokurist Bügel
- Urlaub auf Ehrenwort (1955) as Gefreiter Krawutke
- Le Chemin du paradis (1956)
- Mädchen mit schwachem Gedächtnis (1956) as police medic
- Küß mich noch einmal (1956) as Peter
- Der Hauptmann von Köpenick (The captain of Köpenick) (1956) as Kallenberg (Director: Helmut Käutner)
- Ohne Dich wird es Nacht (Without you all is darkness) (1956) as pharmacist
- Zu Befehl, Frau Feldwebel (1956) as Lemke
- Ein Mann muß nicht immer schön sein (1956) as Knacker-Karl
- Charleys Tante (Charley's aunt) (1956)
- Der müde Theodor (Tired Theodore) (1957) as director Noll
- Frühling in Berlin (Spring in Berlin) (1957) as bank robberer
- Ferien auf Immenhof (1957) as Gast
- Das Wirtshaus im Spessart (The Spessart inn) (1958) as robberer Knoll
- Die grünen Teufel von Monte Cassino (The green devils of Monte Cassino) (1958) as Neumann
- Black Forest Cherry Schnapps (1958) as Egon
- Der Maulkorb (The muzzle) (1958) as Wilhelm Donnerstag
- Der Stern von Santa Clara (The star of Santa Clara) (1958) as Matteo
- Wir Wunderkinder (1958) as narrator
- Hier bin ich – hier bleib ich (Here I am, here I stay) (1959) as presenter
- Nick Knattertons Abenteuer (Nick Knatterton's adventure) (1959) as a butler at Rieselkalk Castle
- Die Nacht vor der Premiere (The night before the premiere) (1959) as Gavrilo
- Rosen für den Staatsanwalt (Roses for the prosecutor) (1959) as Paul
- Der lustige Krieg des Hauptmann Pedro (1959) as Willibald Pauke
- Liebe verboten – Heiraten erlaubt (1959) as Jakob Wilkins
- Napoleon in New Orleans (1959, TV film)
- Als geheilt entlassen (1960) as "Pulle" Kulka
- Wir Kellerkinder (We cellar children) (1960) as Macke Prinz
- Immer Ärger mit dem Bett (1961) as Gabriel Ernst, Bildhauer
- Der Traum von Lieschen Müller (The dream of Lieschen Mueller) (1961) as chauffeur
- Gestatten, mein Name ist Cox (1961, TV series)
- Macky Pancake (1961, TV series, 3 episodes)
- Genosse Münchhausen (1962) as Oskar Puste
- Die endlose Nacht (The endless night) (1963) as Bowlingbahnangestellter Wolfgang
- Die Tote von Beverly Hills (Dead woman from Beverly Hills) (1964) as Ben
- Serenade für zwei Spione (Serenade for two spies) (1965) as secret service chief
- Der schwarze Freitag (1966, TV film) as Jones
- Katz und Maus (Cat and Mouse) (1967) as Pilenz
- Rotmord (1969, TV film) as Erich Mühsam
- Chapeau Claque (1974) as Mr. Draeger
- Das fliegende Chaos (1983)
- Is was, Kanzler? (What's up, chancellor?) (1984) as Annemarie Renger (final film role)

== Cabarett shows ==
- Lachkalorien (end of 1940s)
- Der Mann mit der Pauke (1951)
- Wer nicht hören will muss fernsehen … (1959)
- Zwei Berliner in Paris – eine musikalische Doppel-Conference von Wolfgang Neuss (1959)
- Das jüngste Gerücht (1963)
- Neuss Testament – Die Villon Show (1965)
- Asyl im Domizil (1967)
- Serenade für Angsthasen – in kabarettistisches Solo für Neuss und eine Geige (1967)
- Marxmenschen (1968)
- Neuss vom Tage (mid-1980s in WDR)

== Other recordings ==
- Die Dreigroschenoper (with Lotte Lenya as Jenny and Wolfgang Neuss as Moritat singer, recorded 11–15 January 1958, Afifa Studio, Berlin Tempelhof)

== See also ==
- Wolfgang Müller
