= Hertha Feiler =

Austrian actress

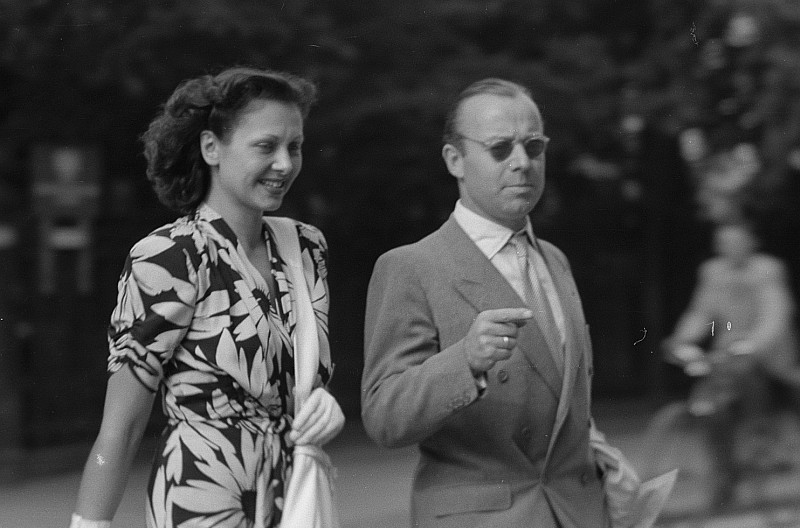
- Hertha Feiler walking with Heinz Rühmann in 1946
- Born: 3 August 1916; Vienna, Austria-Hungary
- Died: 1 November 1970 (aged 54); Munich, Bavaria, West Germany
- Occupation: Actress
- Years active: 1937-1968 (film)
- Spouse(s): Heinz Rühmann (m. 1939)
- Children: Peter Rühmann (b. 1942)

Hertha Feiler (3 August 1916, Vienna – 1 November 1970, Munich) was an Austrian actress. She was married to the comedian Heinz Rühmann with whom she starred in several films. She was of Jewish descent.

== Filmography ==
Year	Title	Role	Notes
1937	Darling of the Sailors	Mary O'Brien	
1938	Adresse unbekannt	Mabel Chesterton	
1938	All Lies	Garda von Doerr	
1939	Men Are That Way	Beatrice Rasmussen	
1939	Escape in the Dark	Barbara Wrede	
1939	Woman in the River	Hannerl	
1940	Lauter Liebe	Marlies Nathusius	
1940	Clothes Make the Man	Nettchen	
1941	Happiness is the Main Thing	Uschi Roth	
1942	Rembrandt	Saskia van Rijn	
1943	A Salzburg Comedy	Konstanze	
1944	Der Engel mit dem Saitenspiel	Susanne Maria Henrici	
1945	Tell the Truth	Maria	
1947	Quax in Africa	Flugschülerin Renate Scholl	
1948	Die kupferne Hochzeit	Mette Zietemann	
1949	Heimliches Rendezvous	Marianne Rothe	
1949	I'll Make You Happy	Barbara	
1953	Anna Louise and Anton	Eva Pogge	
1953	When the White Lilacs Bloom Again	Ellen	
1954	Dein Mund verspricht mir Lieb	Hella Waldenegg	
1954	The Beautiful Miller	Hilde Rüdiger, 'Die schöne Müllerin'	
1955	Let the Sun Shine Again	Mira	
1955	When the Alpine Roses Bloom	Beate Klockenhoff	
1956	Charley's Aunt	Carlotta Ramirez	
1956	Opera Ball	Elisabeth, seine Frau	
1956	Johannisnacht	Martina Lynn	
1956	As Long as the Roses Bloom	Helga Wagner	
1957	The Saint and Her Fool	Charlotte	
1957	Vienna, City of My Dreams	Elisabeth Seyboldt	
1958	The Muzzle	Elisabeth von Treskow	
1958	Sag ja, Mutti	Nora	
1960	My Schoolfriend	Frau Kühn	
1968	The Duck Rings at Half Past Seven	Adele	(final film role)
