= When the Village Music Plays on Sunday Nights =

1953 film

When The Village Music Plays on Sunday Nights
- Directed by: Rudolf Schündler
- Written by: Werner P. Zibaso
- Produced by: Karl Mitschke; Kurt Ulrich
- Starring: Rudolf Prack; Ingeborg Körner; Walter Müller
- Cinematography: Kurt Schulz
- Edited by: Margarete Steinborn
- Music by: Willy Schmidt-Gentner
- Production companies: Berolina Film; Kurt Ulrich Filmproduktion
- Distributed by: Gloria Film
- Release date: 24 September 1953
- Running time: 90 minutes
- Country: West Germany
- Language: German

When The Village Music Plays on Sunday Nights (German: Wenn am Sonntagabend die Dorfmusik spielt) is a 1953 West German romance film directed by Rudolf Schündler and starring Rudolf Prack, Ingeborg Körner and Walter Müller. A remake of a 1933 film of the same title, it is a heimatfilm shot in Gevacolor. It was made at the Tempelhof Studios in Berlin and on location in the Black Forest. The film's sets were designed by the art directors Willi Herrmann and Heinrich Weidemann.

== Cast ==
- Rudolf Prack as Martin
- Ingeborg Körner as Kati Ertl
- Walter Müller as Jonny
- O.E. Hasse as Bruckner
- Erwin Biegel as Weber
- Cecile Cronenberga s Bärbel
- Rasma Ducat
- Erna Haffner as Lydia
- Bruce Low as Singer
- Bruno W. Pantel as Kaspar
- Kurt Pratsch-Kaufmann as Dagobert
- Kurt Reimann as Nachtigall
- Marina Ried as Edith, Sängerin
- Ludwig Schmitz as Tünnes
- Heinz Schulz as Jochen
- Maria Sebaldt as Rosl
- Oskar Sima as Kubbitzky, Konzertagent
- Hans Stüwe as Gutsbesitzer Ertl
- Egon Vogel
- Fritz Wagner as Franz, Ertls Bruder
- Trude Wilke-Roßwog as Wirtin
- Steffi Wüstenberg as Liesl, Wirtin bei Ertl

== Bibliography ==
- Davidson, John & Hake, Sabine. Framing the Fifties: Cinema in a Divided Germany. Berghahn Books, 2007.
