= As Long as the Roses Bloom =

1956 film

- Directed by: Hans Deppe
- Written by: Helga von Wangenheim-Haeussler; Hans Fritz Köllner; Joachim Bartsch; Karl Heinz Busse
- Produced by: Hans Deppe; Wilhelm Gernhardt
- Starring: Hertha Feiler; Gerhard Riedmann; Eva Probst; Willy Fritsch
- Cinematography: Werner M. Lenz
- Edited by: Johanna Meisel
- Music by: Willy Mattes
- Production company: Hans Deppe Film
- Distributed by: Constantin Film
- Release date: 23 November 1956
- Running time: 106 minutes
- Country: West Germany
- Language: German

As Long as the Roses Bloom (German: Solange noch die Rosen blüh'n) is a 1956 West German romance film directed by Hans Deppe and starring Hertha Feiler, Gerhard Riedmann and Eva Probst.

It is a heimatfilm shot at the Spandau Studios in Berlin and on location in Austria. The film's sets were designed by the art director Willi Herrmann and Heinrich Weidemann.

== Cast ==
- Hertha Feiler as Helga Wagner
- Gerhard Riedmann as Michael
- Eva Probst as Anna Huber
- Willy Fritsch as Richard Kühn
- Hans Moser as Alois Lechner, Mayor
- Annie Rosar as Emerentia Huber
- Sabine Eggerth as Toni
- Ingrid Simon as Moni
- Käthe Itter as Schwester Erika
- Kurt Vespermann as Diener
- Franz Schafheitlin as Kunsthändler
- Heinz Lausch as Assistenzarzt

== Bibliography ==
- Höbusch, Harald. "Mountain of Destiny": Nanga Parbat and Its Path Into the German Imagination. Boydell & Brewer, 2016.
- Reimer, Robert C. & Reimer, Carol J. The A to Z of German Cinema. Scarecrow Press, 2010.
