= Commissioner Eyck =

1940 film

- Directed by: Milo Harbich
- Written by: Christian Hallig; Walter Maisch
- Produced by: Ulrich Mohrbutter
- Starring: Anneliese Uhlig; Paul Klinger; Herbert Wilk
- Cinematography: Bruno Stephan
- Edited by: Johanna Meisel
- Music by: Werner Eisbrenner
- Production company: UFA
- Distributed by: UFA
- Release date: 21 March 1940
- Running time: 87 minutes
- Country: Germany
- Language: German

Commissioner Eyck (German: Kriminalkommissar Eyck) is a 1940 German crime film directed by Milo Harbich and starring Anneliese Uhlig, Paul Klinger and Herbert Wilk. It was shot at Tempelhof Studios in Berlin. Location shooting took place in Bavaria.

== Synopsis ==
A Berlin detective's holiday is interrupted by a murder at the winter sports hotel he is staying at. Before long he is on the trail of a gang of international criminals.

== Cast ==
- Anneliese Uhlig as Barbara Sydow
- Paul Klinger as Günter Eyck, Kriminalkommissar
- Herbert Wilk as Hans Brandner, Kriminalkommissar
- Hansjoachim Büttner as Gorgas
- Alexander Engel as van Fliet
- Änne Bruck as Inge Brandner
- Lina Carstens as Mrs. Filter
- Fritz Eckert as Farmer
- Andrews Engelmann as Gustafson
- Lothar Geist as Page
- Alfred Haase as Jeweller
- Knut Hartwig as Schröder
- Herbert Hübner as Hauber
- Karl Jüstel as Dancer
- Dorit Kreysler as Mrs. Gustafson
- Walter Kunkel as Van Fliet's employer
- Walter Lieck as Jonny
- Karl-Heinz Peters as Rapper
- Arthur Reppert as Barman
- Just Scheu as Gren
- Egon Stief as Ganove
- Max Vierlinger as Criminal assistant
- Rudolf Vones as Passant
- Irmgard Willers as Chambermaid
- Willy Witte as Barman

== Bibliography ==
- Moeller, Felix. The Film Minister: Goebbels and the Cinema in the Third Reich. Axel Menges, 2000.
