= Quartet of Five =

1949 film

- Theatrical film poster
- German: Quartett zu fünft
- Directed by: Gerhard Lamprecht
- Written by: Erich Conradi; Erwin Marth; Wolf Neumeister; Hans Vietzke
- Starring: Claus Holm; Yvonne Merin; Ruth Piepho
- Cinematography: Karl Hasselmann; Fritz Lehmann
- Edited by: Johanna Meisel
- Music by: Franz R. Friedl
- Production company: DEFA
- Distributed by: Progress Film; Omnium-Film (West Germany)
- Release date: 3 June 1949
- Running time: 97 minutes
- Country: East Germany
- Language: German

Quartet of Five (German: Quartett zu fünft) is a 1949 East German drama film directed by Gerhard Lamprecht and starring Claus Holm, Yvonne Merin and Ruth Piepho.

The film's sets were designed by the art directors Artur Günther, Karl Schneider and Erich Zander.

== Cast ==
- Claus Holm as Martin Bergau
- Yvonne Merin as Anne Treibel
- Ruth Piepho as Helga Schilling
- Inge Keller as Irene Gabriel
- Ursula Rank as Betti Krull
- Maria Rouvel as Kathrin Winkler
- Harry Hindemith as Stefan Winkler
- Alfred Schieske as Professor Mangold
- Arnold Marquis as Toni Zieseler
- Ralph Lothar as Gaston Rockschmieder
- Karl Hellmer as Dinklage
- Margarete Schön
- Charlotte Ritter as Carola Schmidt-Hanke
- Clemens Hasse as Euler
- Gustav Püttjer as Kalman
- Walter Gross as Schelleboom
- Erich Dunskus as newsman
- Karl Hannemann as workshop owner
- Johannes Bergfeldt as civil servant
- Alfred Maack as nurse #1
- Max Paetz as nurse #2
- Fredy Barten as Wirt
- Erik von Loewis as head doctor
- Reinhard Kolldehoff as patient
- Herbert Kiper as patient
- Martin Rickelt as doctor
- Elka Haedrich as visitor at the hospital
- Ilse Corell as Dinklage's secretary
- Knut Hartwig as sergeant #1
- Arthur Reinhardt as sergeant #2
- Micaela Kreißler as child with doll's carriage
