= Willy Mattes =

Austrian composer

- Born: 4 January 1916; Vienna, Austro-Hungarian Empire
- Died: 30 July 2002 (aged 86); Salzburg, Austria
- Occupation: Composer
- Years active: 1944–1975 (film and TV)

Willy Mattes (4 January 1916 – 30 July 2002) was an Austrian composer and conductor known particularly for the film scores he produced for German cinema. He scored the first two films of the Edgar Wallace series from 1959. He was married to Margit Symo, with whom he was the father of Eva Mattes.

== Selected filmography ==
- The Wedding Hotel (1944)
- Crime in the Sun (1947)
- The Street (1949)
- Two Stories Up (1950)
- Czardas of Hearts (1951)
- Sensation in San Remo (1951)
- The Csardas Princess (1951)
- Street Serenade (1953)
- Guitars of Love (1954)
- The Beautiful Miller (1954)
- Love Is Just a Fairytale (1955)
- The Happy Village (1955)
- When the Alpine Roses Bloom (1955)
- The Song of Kaprun (1955)
- Your Life Guards (1955)
- The Star of Rio (1955)
- A Thousand Melodies (1956)
- Santa Lucia (1956)
- Fruit Without Love (1956)
- My Brother Joshua (1956)
- As Long as the Roses Bloom (1956)
- The Girl with the Cat's Eyes (1958)
- Der Frosch mit der Maske (1959)
- A Summer You Will Never Forget (1959)
- For Love and Others (1959)
- Nick Knatterton's Adventure (1959)
- Bombs on Monte Carlo (1960)
- Final Destination: Red Lantern (1960)
- The Crimson Circle (1960)
- Mystery of the Red Jungle (1964)

== Bibliography ==
- Bergfelder, Tim. International Adventures: German Popular Cinema and European Co-Productions in the 1960s. Berhahn Books, 2005.
- Reimer, Robert C. & Reimer, Carol J. Historical Dictionary of German Cinema. Rowman & Littlefield, 2019.
