= Fresh Wind from Canada =

1935 film

- Directed by: Erich Holder
- Written by: Hans Müller (play); Philipp Lothar Mayring; Albrecht Joseph
- Produced by: Bruno Duday
- Starring: Max Gülstorff; Dorit Kreysler; Paul Hörbiger
- Cinematography: Bruno Mondi
- Edited by: Eduard von Borsody
- Music by: Franz R. Friedl
- Production company: UFA
- Distributed by: UFA
- Release date: 22 February 1935
- Running time: 91 minutes
- Country: Nazi Germany
- Language: German

Fresh Wind from Canada (German: Frischer Wind aus Kanada) is a 1935 German comedy film directed by Erich Holder and starring Max Gülstorff, Dorit Kreysler and Paul Hörbiger. It was shot at the Babelsberg Studios in Potsdam outside Berlin. The film's sets were designed by the art directors Erich Kettelhut and Max Mellin.

== Synopsis ==
A fashion house is losing money through poor management. Henry Baker, a Canadian fur trader and creditor, arrives and helps transform the business with dynamic leadership, winning the love of the owner's daughter Karin in the process.

== Cast ==
- Max Gülstorff as J. N. Granitz
- Dorit Kreysler as Karin, seine Tochter
- Paul Hörbiger as Meinkel, Angestellter Modehaus Granitz
- Oskar Sima as Bernetzki, Angestellter Modehaus Granitz
- Blandine Ebinger as Lore Hartwig, Angestellte Modehaus Granitz
- Jakob Tiedtke as Henry Baker
- Harald Paulsen as Jonny, sein Sohn
- Leopoldine Konstantin as Frau Olden
- Hans Brausewetter as Sven, ihr Sohn
- Aribert Wäscher as Christian Fr. Schulze
- Grethe Weiser as Margot
- Oscar Sabo as Mackie, Box-Trainer
- Werner Finck as Bauer, Photograph
- Annemarie Korff
- Genia Nikolaieva
- Hans Richter as Page
- Ursula Schlettow
- Annemarie Steinsieck
- Hugo Werner-Kahle

== Bibliography ==
- Kreimeier, Klaus (1999). The Ufa Story: A History of Germany's Greatest Film Company, 1918–1945. University of California Press. ISBN 978-0-520-22069-0.
