= Kurt Krenn =

Austrian Roman Catholic prelate

The Most Reverend Kurt Krenn
- Bishop emeritus of Sankt Pölten
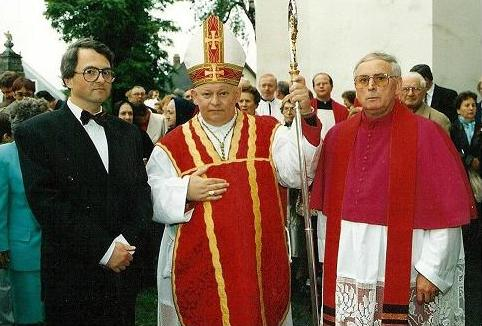
- Church: Catholic Church
- Diocese: Sankt Pölten
- Appointed: 11 July 1991
- Term ended: 7 October 2004

Orders
- Ordination: 7 October 1962
- Consecration: 26 April 1987 by Hans Hermann Groër, OSB

Personal details
- Born: 28 June 1936 Rannarsried, Upper Austria, Austria
- Died: 24 January 2014 (aged 77) Sankt Pölten, Austria
- Parents: Karl & Leopoldine Krenn
- Coat of arms

Kurt Krenn (28 June 1936 – 25 January 2014) was an Austrian Roman Catholic prelate and Bishop of Sankt Pölten, near Vienna, from 1991 to 2004.

== Childhood and youth ==
Kurt Krenn was born in Rannariedl, in the municipality of Neustift im Mühlkreis in Upper Austria, the second of six children of Karl and Leopoldine Krenn. Krenn's parents had left the church in 1941. Two of their children were unbaptized at the end of World War II. Krenn's father was a teacher and was killed in World War II. After the war, the family rejoined the Catholic Church. Krenn attended elementary school in Oberkappel and graduated from high school at the Schlierbach Abbey School.

== Studies, ordination to the priesthood, academic work ==
Krenn entered the seminary in Linz in 1954 and studied philosophy and theology at the Pontifical Gregorian University and canon law at the Pontifical Lateran University in Rome from 1955 to 1965. He earned licentiate degrees in theology and canon law, as well as a doctorate in philosophy with a dissertation on "The Meaning of Being in the Condition of Participation" in Thomas Aquinas. On 7 October 1962, he was ordained a priest in the Church of Sant'Ignazio in Rome and then served as pastor in the parish of Capena - on the outskirts of Rome.

After studying at the University of Tübingen (1966-1967) and the Ludwig-Maximilians-Universität München (1967-1970), where he was an assistant to Wilhelm Keilbach at the theological faculty, he was professor of philosophy at the Philosophical-Theological Institute at Linz from 1970 to 1975. In 1975, he was appointed Full Professor to the Chair of Systematic Theology at the Faculty of Catholic Theology of the University of Regensburg, which he held until 1987. He was co-editor of the Archiv für Religionspsychologie from 1978 to 1994, and from 1985 he was co-editor of the journal Forum Katholische Theologie, a conservative offshoot of the Münchener Theologische Zeitschrift.

== Views ==
Krenn was a theological conservative. He argued against Turkey's entrance into the European Union, warning against the 'Islamisation' of Europe and calling Islam a "very aggressive kind of religion" that would not easily allow for the political unity Christian neighbors. He was known for his criticism of the European Union.

== Abuse scandal ==
In the fall of 2003 a scandal arose around the seminary of the diocese of St. Pölten because of homosexual acts and child pornography. The seminarian Piotr Zarlinski, who had the porn on his computer, was sentenced to a six-month conditional prison sentence. In addition, there were homosexual relations in the seminary. The scandal provoked massive internal and external church criticism. Bishop Klaus Küng was appointed Apostolic Visitator to investigate the allegations. The seminary was temporarily closed. On 29 September 2004 Krenn resigned from his episcopate at the request of Pope John Paul II, though without confirming the accusations. Klaus Küng was eventually appointed the new bishop.
