= The Faithful Hussar (film) =

1954 film

- Directed by: Rudolf Schündler
- Written by: Rolf Dortenwald
- Produced by: Friedrich Wilhelm Gaik; Erich Holder
- Starring: Paul Hörbiger; Loni Heuser; Harald Paulsen
- Cinematography: Karl Löb; Fritz Arno Wagner
- Edited by: Margarete Steinborn
- Music by: Willy Schmidt-Gentner
- Production company: Algefa Film
- Distributed by: Herzog Film
- Release date: 17 April 1954
- Running time: 90 minutes
- Country: West Germany
- Language: German

The Faithful Hussar (German: Der treue Husar) is a 1954 West German comedy film directed by Rudolf Schündler and starring Paul Hörbiger, Loni Heuser and Harald Paulsen. It was shot at the Tempelhof Studios in West Berlin. The film's sets were designed by the art directors Willi A. Herrmann and Heinrich Weidemann. It takes its title from the traditional German song of the same title.

== Synopsis ==
Sportswear salesman Eberhard Wacker is a member of a male choir known as The Faithful Hussar. Henpecked by his wife, he arranges to escape and have fun with his friends at a bar during carnival time. Before long their wives discover their plans.

== Cast ==
- Paul Hörbiger as Eberhard Wacker
- Loni Heuser as Ernestine Wacker
- Harry Meyen as Fred Wacker
- Harald Paulsen as Otto Kersten
- Ina Halley as Anita Kersten
- Doris Kirchner as Uschi Wagner
- Lucie Englisch as Resi Naderer
- Roland Kaiser as Kurtchen
- Die Dynamite-Cats as Kapelle
- Toby Fichelscher as Musik Leiter
- Wolf Gabbe as Singer
- Egon Kaiser as Kapelle
- Alice Treff as Liselotte seine Frau

== Bibliography ==
- Judt, Tony. Postwar: A History of Europe Since 1945. Random House, 2011.
