= Sári Barabás =

Hungarian operatic soprano (1914–2012)

Sári Barabás (14 March 1914 – 16 April 2012) was a Hungarian operatic soprano, particularly associated with coloratura roles.

== Biography ==
Sári Barabás was born in Budapest. She planned to be a dancer, but after an injury she turned to singing. She studied in Budapest with Frau Speckler, and made her debut at the Budapest Opera in 1939, as Gilda in Rigoletto. World War II interrupted her career. After the war, she appeared at the Zurich Opera and the Vienna Volksoper, and then joined the Munich State Opera in 1949, where she remained until 1971, she was also a guest at the Vienna State Opera, in The Barber of Seville, The Magic Flute and Capriccio, where she established a reputation as a soprano of agility and glamorous personality.

She made guest appearances as Gilda, at the Royal Opera House in London in 1951, and at the Glyndebourne Festival, where she sang Konstanze in Die Entführung aus dem Serail, Adele in Le comte Ory, and Zerbinetta in Ariadne auf Naxos to great acclaim. She made her American debut at the San Francisco Opera in 1950, as the Queen of the Night in The Magic Flute. She also sang operetta, and enjoyed considerable success in London in 1970, in a revival of the musical The Great Waltz at the Theatre Royal Drury Lane, which coincided with her appearance on Desert Island Discs. Billy Mayerl had in 1958 requested to take Barabás with him to the desert island as his luxury item.

Having appeared in the title role of the 1951 German film Die Dubarry, for the 1955 Powell and Pressburger musical Oh... Rosalinda!!, she sang the title role for the actress Ludmilla Tchérina (Nixa NLP 18001). She made her final stage appearance at the Gärtnerplatz in 2007, in the speaking role of Princess Anhilte in Die Csárdásfürstin.

== Personal life/death ==
From 1956 Barabás was married to tenor Franz Klarwein (1914–1991). She died on 16 April 2012, aged 98, after suffering a stroke.

== Discography ==
- Fall – Die Dollarprinzessin (EMI)
- Fall – Der liebe Augustin (EMI)
- Kálmán – Die Csárdásfürstin (EMI) - Sylva Varescu
- Kálmán – Gräfin Mariza (EMI) - title role
- Mozart – Die Entführung aus dem Serail (Walhall) - Konstanze
- Rossini – Il barbiere di Siviglia (Walhall)
- Rossini – Le Comte Ory (EMI) - Comtesse Adèle
- Schröder – Hochzeitsnacht im Paradies (EMI)
- Strauss - Der Zigeunerbaron (Philips) - Saffi
- Strauss I & II (arr.) - The Great Waltz (EMI)
- Hungarian songs

== Sources ==
- Biography on Operissimo.com (in German)
