= When Men Cheat =

1950 film directed by Carl Boese

- Directed by: Carl Boese
- Written by: Carl Boese; Curth Flatow; Károly Nóti (play); Kurt Schwabach (play)
- Produced by: Frank Clifford
- Starring: Grethe Weiser; Kurt Seifert; Jeanette Schultze
- Cinematography: Herbert Körner
- Edited by: Ursula Neste
- Music by: Viktor Altmann
- Production company: Cordial-Film
- Distributed by: Ring-Film; Sascha Film (Austria)
- Release date: 26 August 1950
- Running time: 85 minutes
- Country: West Germany
- Language: German

When Men Cheat (German: Wenn Männer schwindeln) is a 1950 West German comedy film directed by Carl Boese and starring Grethe Weiser, Kurt Seifert and Jeanette Schultze. It was made at the Tempelhof Studios in Berlin. The film's sets were designed by the art directors Willi Herrmann and Heinrich Weidemann.

== Cast ==
- Grethe Weiser as Frau Bamberg
- Kurt Seifert as Arthur Bamberg, Seidenfabrikant, ihr Mann
- Jeanette Schultze as Angelika, Studentin u. 'Taxigirl'
- Emil Suhrmann as Paul, Bambergs Freund
- Ida Wüst as Frau Schröder, Zimmervermieterin
- Rudolf Platte as Pauls Diener
- Ruth Lommel
- Alexa von Porembsky
- Ute Sielisch
- Walter Gross
- Fritz Böttger
- Franz-Otto Krüger
- Oscar Sabo
- Ellen Hille

== Bibliography ==
- Bock, Hans-Michael; Bergfelder, Tim, eds. (2009). The Concise Cinegraph: Encyclopaedia of German Cinema. Berghahn Books. ISBN 978-1-57181-655-9.
