= Praxis Bülowbogen =

1987–1996 German television series

- Starring: Günter Pfitzmann
- Country of origin: West Germany; Germany

Original release
- Release: 1987 – 1996

Praxis Bülowbogen is a German television series.

== Casts ==
Main characters:

- Günter Pfitzmann: Dr. Peter Brockmann
- Anita Kupsch: Gabi Köhler
- Mareike Carrière: Dr. Kathrin Brockmann

Family and friends of Dr. Brockmann:

- Johanna von Koczian: Lore Brockmann

(edition 1 and 2)

- Heidi Brühl: Bea Knapp

(edition 1)

- Mona Seefried: Iris Pauli

(edition 1 and 2, 5)

- Cornelia Froboess: Dr. Pia Michaelis

(edition 3 and 4)

- Holger Handtke: Nico Michaelis

(edition 3 and 4)

- Wolf Roth: Carlos Neuhaus

(edition 3 and 4)

- Christina Plate: Sigi Kaul

(edition 1 to 4)

- Inge Wolffberg: Grandma Köster

(Staffel 1 bis 4)

- Families Maerker and Saalbach:
- Carola Höhn: Anna Maerker
- Bruno Dietrich: Dr. Georg Maerker
- Vera Müller: Rebecca Maerker (edition 1 to 4)
- Eleonore Weisgerber: Dr. Gisela Saalbach

(edition 1 to 4)

- Dieter Thomas Heck: Bernd Saalbach

(edition 1 to 4)

- Julia Biedermann: Annelie Saalbach

(edition 1 and 2)

- Florian Schmidt-Foß: Hinrich Saalbach

(edition 1 to 4)

- Gerrit Schmidt-Foß: Jens Saalbach

(edition 1 to 4)

- Ronald Nitschke: Rudi Lehmann

(edition 1 to 3)

- Gabi Heinecke: Sonja Lehmann

(edition 1 to 3)

Family Solms:

- Jürgen Thormann: Richard Solms

(edition 5 and 6)

- Almut Eggert: Dr. Birgit Solms

(edition 5 and 6)

- Peter Wilczynski: Wolf Solms

(edition 5 and 6)

- Beate Maes: Bettina Solms

(edition 5 and 6)

Homelessness in Berlin:

- Klaus Schwarzkopf: „Gleisdreieck“

(edition 1 to 3)

- Günter Meisner: Berti

(edition 4 and 5)

- Gerd E. Schäfer: Ludger

(edition 4 to 6)

- Gerry Wolff: „Fuzzi“

(edition 5 and 6)

- Michael Christian: Harry

(edition 4 and 6)

Praxisteam and patients:

- Johanna König: Schwester Erika
- Katja Bienert: Laborantin Yvonne
- Gesine Cukrowski: Schwester Irene
- Jana Kozewa: Arzthelferin Marion
- Herbert Weißbach: Grandpa Schnabel
- Waltraud Habicht: Frau Rust

Different persons:

- Myriam Stark: Annemarie Seidel
- Stefan Behrens: Dr. Jens Peters
- Monika Peitsch: Angela Martens
- Olivia Augustinski: Chea Siebert
- Isa Jank: Dr. Nadja Bredow

== See also ==
- List of German television series
