= The Beautiful Miller =

1954 film

- Directed by: Wolfgang Liebeneiner
- Written by: Ilse Lotz-Dupont
- Produced by: Friedrich Wilhelm Gaik; Erich Holder
- Starring: Waltraut Haas; Gerhard Riedmann; Hertha Feiler
- Cinematography: Bruno Timm
- Edited by: Hermann Leitner
- Music by: Willy Mattes
- Production company: Algefa Film
- Distributed by: Constantin Film
- Release date: 23 September 1954
- Running time: 99 minutes
- Country: West Germany
- Language: German

The Beautiful Miller (German: Die schöne Müllerin) is a 1954 West German romantic drama film directed by Wolfgang Liebeneiner and starring Waltraut Haas, Gerhard Riedmann and Hertha Feiler. It was made at the Tempelhof Studios in West Berlin. The film's sets were designed by the art directors Willi Herrmann and Heinrich Weidemann. It was shot using Gevacolor.

== Cast ==
- Waltraut Haas as Inge Kunze
- Gerhard Riedmann as Fritz Mertens
- Hertha Feiler as Hilde Rüdiger, 'Die schöne Müllerin'
- Katharina Mayberg as Kat Dramberger
- Paul Hörbiger as Albert Krügler
- Fritz Wagner as Anton Vogt
- Margarete Haagen as Josefine Krügler
- Willy Rösner as Walter Kunze, Erlenbachwirt
- Wolfgang Neuss as Sepp
- Marina Ried as Sekretärin Ursl
- Paul Westermeier as Hermann Knorr
- Albert Florath as Dramberger, Organist
- Harald Paulsen as Mühlenkonsort
- Käthe Itter as Lina
- Sepp Rist as Kriminalinspektor
- Carla Rust as Frau Rüdiger
- Ursula Voß as Rosl
- Karola Ebeling
- Gisela Griffel as Sängerin

== Bibliography ==
- Bock, Hans-Michael & Bergfelder, Tim. The Concise CineGraph. Encyclopedia of German Cinema. Berghahn Books, 2009.
