= Karl Schneider (art director) =

German art director

- Born: 19 July 1916; Berlin, German Empire
- Died: 18 December 1996 (aged 80); Daun, Germany
- Occupation: Art director
- Years active: 1949–1984 (film & TV)

Karl Schneider (1916 – 1996) was a German art director. He was active in East German cinema from 1949 onwards, at the state-controlled Babelsberg Studios, but later worked in the West.

== Selected filmography ==
- The Blue Swords (1949)
- Quartet of Five (1949)
- The Benthin Family (1950)
- The Axe of Wandsbek (1951)
- The Empress of China (1953)
- Der Teufel vom Mühlenberg (1955)
- Les Misérables (1958)
- Peter Voss, Thief of Millions (1958)
- Every Day Isn't Sunday (1959)
- Hot Pavements of Cologne (1967)
- Our Doctor is the Best (1969)
- Count Dracula (1970)

== Bibliography ==
- Stephen Brockmann. A Critical History of German Film. Camden House, 2010.
