= Scandal at the Embassy =

1950 film directed by Erik Ode

- Directed by: Erik Ode
- Written by: Georg Fraser (play); Karl Peter Gillmann; Kurt Schwabach
- Produced by: Richard Eichberg
- Starring: Viktor de Kowa; Jeanette Schultze; Michiko Tanaka
- Cinematography: Friedl Behn-Grund
- Edited by: Alexandra Anatra
- Music by: Harald Böhmelt
- Production company: Eichberg-Film
- Distributed by: National-Film
- Release date: 8 December 1950
- Running time: 95 minutes
- Country: West Germany
- Language: German

Scandal at the Embassy (German: Skandal in der Botschaft) is a 1950 West German comedy film directed by Erik Ode and starring Viktor de Kowa, Jeanette Schultze and Michiko Tanaka.

It was shot at the Bavaria Studios in Munich. The film's sets were designed by the art director Willi Herrmann and Heinrich Weidemann.

== Cast ==
- Viktor de Kowa as Fred Corvin & Dr. Tamanyo
- Jeanette Schultze as Fanny
- Michiko Tanaka as Nina, die Botschafterin
- Andrews Engelmann as Der Botschafter
- Ernst Waldow as Ministerialrat
- Johannes von Hamme as Exzellenz
- Fritz Odemar as Gefängnisdirektor
- Fritz Rasp as Inspector Kick
- Rita Paul
- Rudolf Carl as Gefängnisbeamter
- Gunther Philipp
- Walter Janssen
- Mady Rahl as Rita
- Udo Loeptin
- Erik Ode
- Walter Hillbring
- Ulrich Beiger
- Marianne Pastré as Tänzerin
- Maria Zach
- Ulrich Folkmar
- Karl-Heinz Peters
- Ernst Rotmund

== Bibliography ==
- Hans-Michael Bock and Tim Bergfelder. The Concise Cinegraph: An Encyclopedia of German Cinema. Berghahn Books, 2009.
