= Sergeant Borck =

1955 film

- Directed by: Gerhard Lamprecht
- Written by: Freiherr W. von Reitzenstein (novel); Walter F. Fichelscher
- Produced by: Friedrich Wilhelm Gaik
- Starring: Gerhard Riedmann; Annemarie Düringer; Ingrid Andree
- Cinematography: Bruno Timm
- Edited by: Ilse Voigt
- Music by: Günter Klück; Helmut Zacharias
- Production company: Algefa Film
- Distributed by: Allianz Filmverleih
- Release date: 4 August 1955
- Running time: 99 minutes
- Country: West Germany
- Language: German

Sergeant Borck (German: Oberwachtmeister Borck) is a 1955 West German drama film directed by Gerhard Lamprecht and starring Gerhard Riedmann, Annemarie Düringer and Ingrid Andree. It is a remake of the 1935 film Sergeant Schwenke. It was shot at the Spandau Studios in West Berlin and on location in Hamburg. The film's sets were designed by the art directors Willi A. Herrmann and Heinrich Weidemann.

== Cast ==
- Gerhard Riedmann as Oberwachtmeister Borck
- Annemarie Düringer as Erna Lucht
- Ingrid Andree as Käthe Sperling
- Ralph Lothar as Karl Franzek
- Jane Tilden as Betty Staade
- Carsta Löck as Emmy Sperling
- Hilde Sessak as Fanny Himmelreich
- Bum Krüger as Hauptwachtmeister Sperling
- Rudolf Fernau as Großhändler Willy Staade
- Fritz Wagner as Hauptkommissar Dahl
- Günter Pfitzmann as Wachtmeister Heinz Ohlsen
- Karl Klüsner as Kriminalkommissar Ströbel
- Arthur Schröder as Gerichtsvollzieher
- Reinhard Kolldehoff as Spediteur Süßkind
- Wolfgang Neuss as Toto-Krüger
- Margarete Schön as neugierige Zeugin
- Manny Ziener as vergeßliche Frau
- Kurt Rackelmann as Tankwärter Friedrich
- Erik von Loewis as Kriminalhauptkommissar Dr. Kopp
- Otz Tollen as Polizeirat
- Wolf Harnisch as Defense lawyer
- Erwin Mosblech as Protokollführer
- Helmut von Hofe as Graphologe
- Wolfgang Burkhardt
- Ralf Wolter as Zopfer

== Bibliography ==
- Goble, Alan. The Complete Index to Literary Sources in Film. Walter de Gruyter, 1999.
