= Martina (film) =

1949 film directed by Arthur Maria Rabenalt

- Directed by: Arthur Maria Rabenalt
- Written by: Gerte Illing; Werner Illing; Otto Bernhard Wendler
- Produced by: Heinz Rühmann; Alf Teichs
- Starring: Jeanette Schultze; Cornell Borchers; Siegmar Schneider
- Cinematography: Albert Benitz
- Edited by: Walter Boos; Walter Wischniewsky
- Music by: Werner Eisbrenner
- Production company: Comedia-Film
- Distributed by: Schorcht Filmverleih
- Release date: 8 July 1949
- Running time: 90 minutes
- Country: West Germany
- Language: German

Martina is a 1949 West German drama film directed by Arthur Maria Rabenalt, and starring Jeanette Schultze, Cornell Borchers, and Siegmar Schneider. It was shot at the Tempelhof Studios in Berlin. The film's sets were designed by the art directors Willi Herrmann and Gabriel Pellon.

== Cast ==
- Jeanette Schultze as Martina
- Cornell Borchers as Irene
- Siegmar Schneider as Volker
- Albert Hehn as Donny
- Werner Hinz as Professor Rauscher
- Arno Paulsen as Kuchenreuther
- Antonie Jaeckel
- Kurt Vespermann
- Margarete Kupfer
- Dieter Angermann
- Reinhard Kolldehoff
