= Karl Schulz =

German footballer

Personal information
- Date of birth: 10 May 1901
- Date of death: unknown
- Position: Midfielder

Senior career*
Years	Team	Apps	(Gls)
- BFC Viktoria 1889

International career
1929	Germany	1	(0)
- * Club domestic league appearances and goals

Karl Schulz (born 10 May 1901, date of death unknown) was a German international footballer.
