= Georg Pahl =

German press photographer (1900–1963)

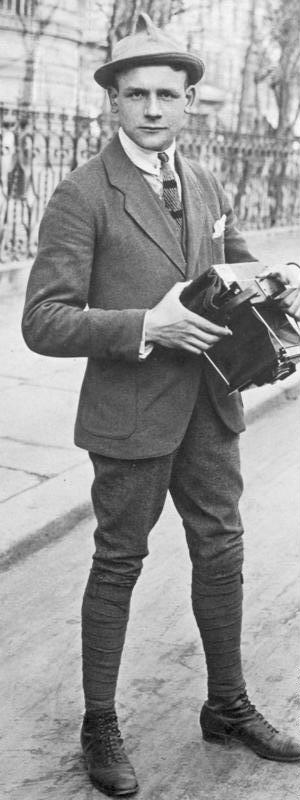
- Born: 20 October 1900
- Died: 13 May 1963 (aged 62)
- Occupation: Photographer, journalist, cinematographer, actor

Georg Pahl (20 October 1900 – 13 May 1963) was a German press photographer and journalist of the 1920s and early 1930s. Pahl is notable as the photographer who published the first photographs of Adolf Hitler.

== Career ==
From 1923, Georg Pahl studied under with Heinrich Sanden I (born in 1877), a professional photographer who had founded the company Atlantic Photo in Berlin in 1919 (the company would change its name to Atlantic Photo-Gesellschaft mbH in 1930). On 4 March 1923, Pahl founded his own agency, A-B-C-Aktuelle-Bilder-Centrale, in Berlin-Steglitz. His venture specialised on important political events, public events and daily life in the Weimar Republic and the period of National Socialism from 1923 to 1936.

From 1919 to 1923, Hitler went essentially unphotographed, as to prevent the police from obtaining images that would help in his identification. (Note: Hitler's party, the NSDAP, had been banned in Prussia on 15 November 1922 and as chairman and an Austrian citizen, he faced arrest.) Georg Pahl obtained the first images from these early years of the Party, when he recognised and photographed Hitler as he visited the Luna Park in Berlin. Pahl reported that Hitler tried to jump him and seize the camera, but failed, and eventually convinced Pahl to destroy the negative. On 2 September 1923, Pahl managed to photograph Hitler again during the Deutscher Tag parade at Nuremberg, before fleeing before SA stormtroopers; these images were the first published photographs of Hitler. As a consequence to these events, Hitler established ties with Heinrich Hoffmann to control his imagery, and from 1934 Georg Pahl was officially banned from attending events of the NSDAP.

In 1944, Pahl was one of the cameramen of Panorama-Farbmonatsschau, a monthly show of colour news. Pahl's works feature prominently in the German Federal Archives.

Selected works
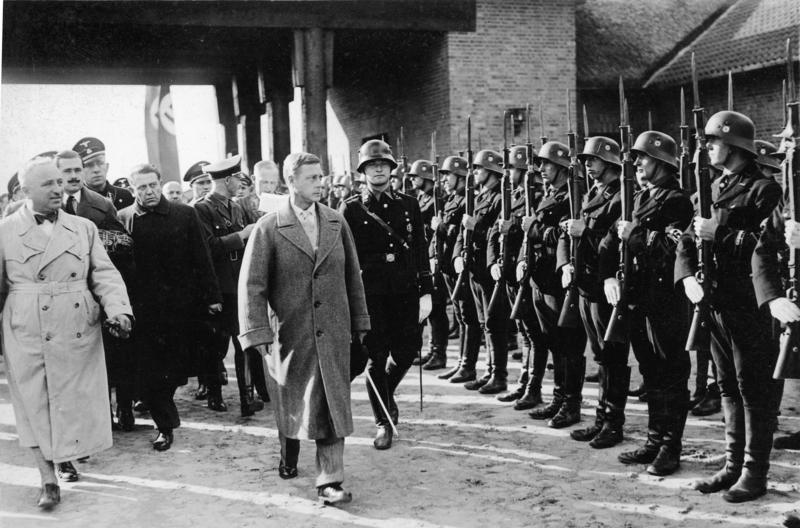
Edward, Duke of Windsor, on a visit to the Ordensburg Krössinsee 1937

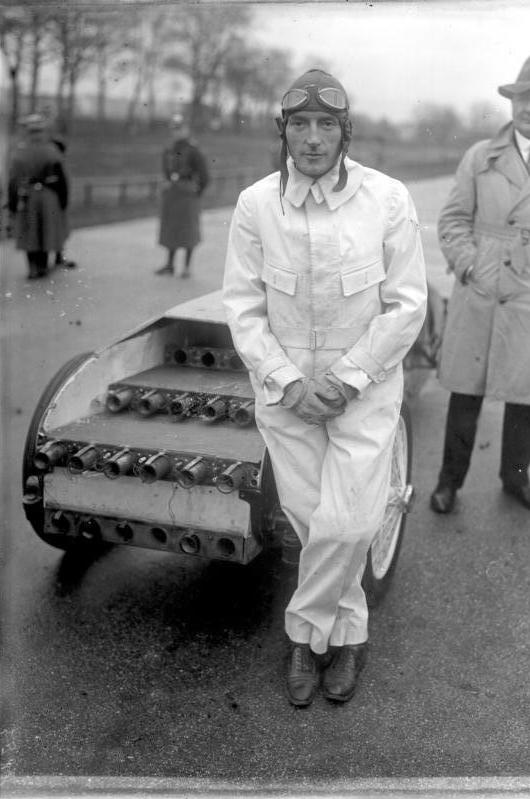
Engineer and Racedriver Kurt C. Volkhart and his rocket car Nürburgring 1929

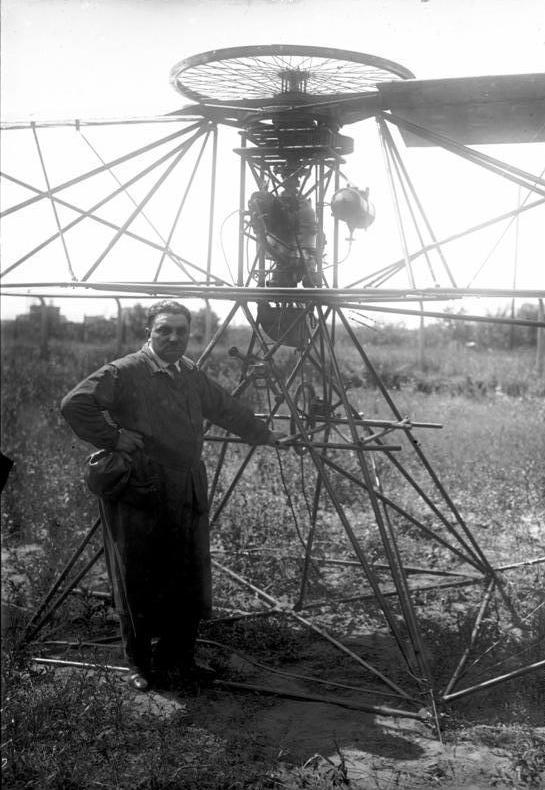
Engineer and inventor Engelbert Zaschka with rotary tool, Berlin 1927
