= Franz R. Friedl =

Austrian violist and composer

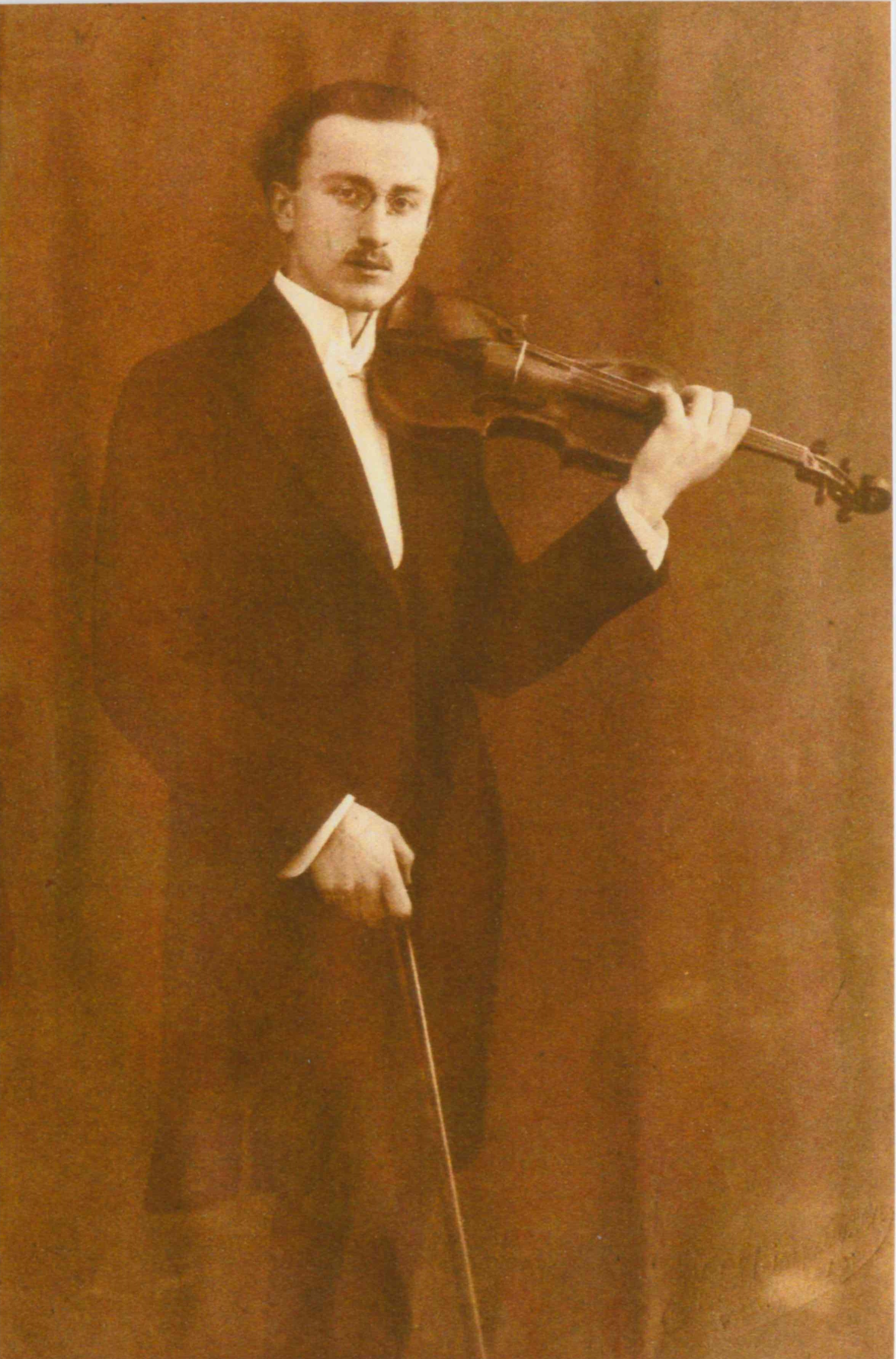
- Friedl in 1912
- Born: Franz René Friedl; 30 May 1892; Oberkappel, Austria-Hungary
- Died: 5 December 1977 (aged 85); Essen, West Germany
- Occupations: Violinist, violist, composer
- Children: 1

Franz René Friedl (30 May 1892 – 5 December 1977), was an Austrian violist and composer.

He was born in Oberkappel, then part of Austria-Hungary. The son of a cooper he attended grammar school and then received artistic training from Rosé and Carl Flesch. Friedl then worked as concertmaster in Dortmund and Dresden. From 1923 to 1926 Franz Friedl was principal violist at the Teatro Colón in Buenos Aires, since 1927 the Upper Austrian, worked as a composer and composed chamber music, overtures. From 1933 he was music composer for theatre and films, including The Eternal Jew, a film promoting Nazi ideology against Jews. He is listed on some recordings as the conductor of the "Berlin Symphony Orchestra", a pseudonym of an unidentified ensemble, but it is doubtful whether he actually was the conductor. From 1940 to 1945 he was musical director of Die Deutsche Wochenschau. The grandchild of his only daughter is Björn Stenvers.

He died in Essen, on 5 December 1977.

== Film scores ==
- 1932 Das Testament des Dr. Mabuse
- 1933 Rivalen der Luft
- 1933 Von Gemsen und Steinböcken
- 1933 Aus der Heimat des Elchs
- 1933 Tierbilder aus den finnischen Wäldern
- 1933 Affenstreiche
- 1933 Kraftleistungen der Pflantzen
- 1934 Wilhelm Tell
- 1934: Von Königsberg bis Berchtesgaden
- 1934: Besuch im Karzer
- 1934: Wunderbauten aus Chinas Kaiserzeit
- 1934: Von Schwarzkitteln und Schauflern
- 1934 Schloß Hubertus
- 1935 Frischer Wind aus Kanada
- 1935: Abessinien von heute – Blickpunkt der Welt (Dokumentarfilm)
- 1935 Stützen der Gesellschaft
- 1935: Im Lande Widukinds
- 1935 Die Heilige und ihr Narr
- 1935: Kater Lampe
- 1936 Flitterwochen
- 1936 Annemarie, the story of young love
- 1938 Es leuchten die Sterne
- 1938 Liebelei und Liebe
- 1938 Rätsel der Urwaldhölle
- 1938 Der Edelweißkönig
- 1939 Arinka (USSR, Lenfilm)
- 1939 Das Ekel
- 1940 Kampf um Norwegen
- 1940 Der ewige Jude
- 1949 (UA 1950) Ruf an das Gewissen
- 1949 Quartett zu fünft
- 1950 Leben aus dem Teich
- 1950 Bürgermeisterin Anna
- 1951 Berlin kommt wieder
- 1951 Zugverkehr unregelmäßig
- 1951 Es geht nicht ohne Gisela
- 1957 Kanaillen

== Selected compositions ==
- Beethoven: Symphony No. 3 in F Flat "Eroica" Op. 55, Berlin Symphony Orchestra (1952)
- Brahms: Symphony No. 3 in F Major, Op. 90, Berlin Symphony Orchestra (1953)
- Brahms Symphony No. 4 on Royale 1239, Berlin Symphony Orchestra (1954)
- Blaue Mondnacht am Amazonas, Tanzorchester Erhard Bauschke (Gr. 10704 / 7477 1/2 GR (1937)
- La Danza, Fritz Wunderlich, Ein Unvergessener Tenor (1969)
- Prolog, für großes Orchester
- Schubert: Symphony No. 3 in D Major, Royale 1236, Berlin Symphony Orchestra (1952)
- Tanz der Masken, Ballett-Fantasie für großes Orchester
- Tänzerisches Capriccio, für Orchester
- Viennese Waltzes, Op. 90, Berlin Symphony Orchestra (1950)
