= Agnes Günther =

German writer (1863–1911)

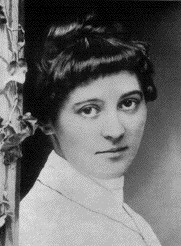
- Born: Agnes Breuning; 21 July 1863; Stuttgart, Kingdom of Württemberg
- Died: 16 February 1911 (aged 47); Marburg an der Lahn, Hesse, Germany
- Spouse: Rudolf Günther

Agnes Günther (born Agnes Breuning, 21 July 1863 – 16 February 1911) was a German writer.

== Life ==
Agnes Breuning was a daughter of Hermann Otto Breuning, a businessman and banker, and his wife Anna Maria Barrell, who came from England. Agnes attended schools in Geneva and London. In 1887 she married the theologian Rudolf Günther (1856-1936), with whom she had two sons. From 1891 to 1906 her husband was the parish priest of Langenburg, a small town above the river Jagst in the Hohenlohe district of the then kingdom of Württemberg. The family moved in 1906 to Marburg, where Rudolf Günther was appointed professor of church art. In 1911 Agnes died of a lung disease after a long illness.

== Works ==
Günther's two works were published posthumously in 1913.

- Die Heilige und ihr Narr (The Saint and her Fool)
- Von der Hexe, die eine Heilige war (About the Witch who was a Saint)
