= List of West German films of 1957 =

List of films produced in Germany in 1957

List of West German films of 1957. Feature films produced and distributed in West Germany in 1957.

== A–Z ==
Title	Director	Cast	Genre	Notes
20 Million Miles to Earth	Nathan H. Juran	William Hopper, Joan Taylor, Frank Puglia	Science fiction	Co-production with United States and Italy
All Roads Lead Home	Hans Deppe	Luise Ullrich, Christian Doermer, Fritz Tillmann	Drama	
Almenrausch and Edelweiss	Harald Reinl	Elma Karlowa, Karin Dor, Harald Juhnke	Comedy	Co-production with Austria
And Lead Us Not Into Temptation	Rolf Hansen	Johanna Matz, Heidemarie Hatheyer, Gerhard Riedmann	Drama	
Aunt Wanda from Uganda	Géza von Cziffra	Grethe Weiser, Georg Thomalla, Lucie Englisch	Comedy	
Beneath the Palms on the Blue Sea	Hans Deppe	Bibi Johns, Giulia Rubini, Harald Juhnke	Musical	
Between Munich and St. Pauli	Hermann Kugelstadt	Joe Stöckel, Beppo Brem, Lucie Englisch	Comedy	
The Big Chance	Hans Quest	Walter Giller, Gardy Granass, Michael Cramer	Comedy	
Call Girls	Arthur Maria Rabenalt	Claus Holm, Ingmar Zeisberg, Kai Fischer, Erwin Strahl	Crime	Co-production with Denmark
Confessions of Felix Krull	Kurt Hoffmann	Horst Buchholz, Liselotte Pulver, Ingrid Andree	Drama	
The Count of Luxemburg	Werner Jacobs	Gerhard Riedmann, Renate Holm, Susi Nicoletti	Musical, Comedy	
The Daring Swimmer	Karl Anton	Gunther Philipp, Susanne Cramer, Walter Gross	Comedy	
The Devil Strikes at Night	Robert Siodmak	Mario Adorf, Hannes Messemer, Claus Holm	Thriller	
Doctor Bertram	Werner Klingler	Willy Birgel, Winnie Markus, Sonja Ziemann	Drama	
Draußen vor der Tür	Rudolf Noelte	Paul Edwin Roth	Drama	a.k.a. The Man Outside
El Hakim	Rolf Thiele	O.W. Fischer, Nadja Tiller, Elisabeth Müller	Drama	
The Fox of Paris	Paul May	Martin Held, Marianne Koch, Hardy Krüger	Thriller	Co-production with France
The Girl and the Legend	Josef von Báky	Romy Schneider, Horst Buchholz, Gert Fröbe	Drama	
The Girl Without Pyjamas	Hans Quest	Ingeborg Christiansen, Bert Fortell, Elma Karlowa	Comedy	
The Glass Tower	Harald Braun	Lilli Palmer, O. E. Hasse, Peter van Eyck	Drama	
Goodbye, Franziska	Wolfgang Liebeneiner	Ruth Leuwerik, Carlos Thompson, Josef Meinrad	Romance	
Greetings and Kisses from Tegernsee	Rudolf Schündler	Elma Karlowa, Bert Fortell, Christiane Maybach	Comedy	
Haie und kleine Fische	Frank Wisbar	Hansjörg Felmy, Horst Frank, Wolfgang Preiss	War drama	a.k.a. Sharks and Little Fish
The Heart of St. Pauli	Eugen York	Hans Albers, Hansjörg Felmy, Gert Fröbe	Musical	
Jonas	Ottomar Domnick	Robert Graf, Dieter Eppler	Drama	
The Judge and His Hangman	Franz Peter Wirth	Karl-Georg Saebisch, Herbert Tiede, Robert Meyn	Drama	a.k.a. Der Richter und sein Henker
Just Once a Great Lady	Erik Ode	Gudula Blau, Grethe Weiser, Dietmar Schönherr	Comedy	
Kindermädchen für Papa gesucht	Hans Quest	Claus Biederstaedt, Susanne Cramer, Gunther Philipp	Comedy	
King in Shadow	Harald Braun	O. W. Fischer, Odile Versois, Horst Buchholz	Historical	
The Last Ones Shall Be First	Rolf Hansen	O. E. Hasse, Maximilian Schell, Ulla Jacobsson	Drama	Entered into the 7th Berlin International Film Festival
The Legs of Dolores	Géza von Cziffra	Germaine Damar, Claus Biederstaedt, Theo Lingen	Musical comedy	
Lemke's Widow	Helmut Weiss	Grethe Weiser, Brigitte Grothum, Michael Heltau	Comedy	
Love from Paris	Helmut Käutner	Romy Schneider, Horst Buchholz, Mara Lane	Romantic drama	a.k.a. Monpti
The Mad Bomberg	Rolf Thiele	Hans Albers, Marion Michael, Gert Fröbe	Comedy	
Made in Germany	Wolfgang Schleif	Winnie Markus, Carl Raddatz, Margit Saad	Historical	
Marriages Forbidden	Heinz Paul	Ingeborg Cornelius, Helga Franck, Herta Konrad	Comedy	
Mischief in Wonderland	Otto Meyer	Alexander Engel, Sabine Sesselmann, Cordula Trantow	Family	
Nature Girl and the Slaver	Hermann Leitner	Marion Michael, Adrian Hoven, Rik Battaglia	Adventure	
The Night of the Storm	Falk Harnack	Lilli Palmer, Ivan Desny, Susanne Cramer	Drama	
Die Panne	Fritz Umgelter	Peter Ahrweiler, Carl Wery, Kurt Horwitz, Harry Hardt, Willy Rösner	Thriller	a.k.a. A Dangerous Game
A Piece of Heaven	Rudolf Jugert	Ingrid Andree, Toni Sailer, Margit Saad	Drama	
The Poacher of the Silver Wood	Otto Meyer	Anita Gutwell, Rudolf Lenz, Lucie Englisch	Drama	
Queen Louise	Wolfgang Liebeneiner	Ruth Leuwerik, Dieter Borsche, René Deltgen	Historical	
Romeo und Julia in Berlin	Hanns Korngiebel	Herbert Stass, Marion Degler, Herbert Weißbach, Reinhold Bernt	Drama	
Rose Bernd	Wolfgang Staudte	Maria Schell, Raf Vallone, Käthe Gold	Drama	Entered into the 1957 Cannes Film Festival
Rübezahl	Erich Kobler	Bobby Todd, Rolf von Nauckhoff	Family	
Salzburg Stories	Kurt Hoffmann	Marianne Koch, Paul Hubschmid, Peter Mosbacher	Comedy	
The Simple Girl	Werner Jacobs	Caterina Valente, Rudolf Prack, Ruth Stephan	Musical comedy	
Spring in Berlin	Arthur Maria Rabenalt	Sonja Ziemann, Gerhard Riedmann, Mártha Eggerth	Comedy	
The Star of Africa	Alfred Weidenmann	Joachim Hansen, Marianne Koch, Hansjörg Felmy	War drama	
Tired Theodore	Géza von Cziffra	Heinz Erhardt, Renate Ewert, Loni Heuser	Comedy	
The Twins from Zillertal	Harald Reinl	Jutta Günther, Joachim Fuchsberger, Karin Dor	Comedy	
Two Bavarians in the Harem	Joe Stöckel	Joe Stöckel, Beppo Brem, Christiane Maybach	Comedy	
Two Bavarians in the Jungle	Ludwig Bender	Joe Stöckel, Beppo Brem, Lucie Englisch	Comedy	
The Unexcused Hour	Willi Forst	Adrian Hoven, Erika Remberg, Hans Moser	Comedy	Co-production with Austria
Victor and Victoria	Karl Anton	Johanna von Koczian, Georg Thomalla, Johannes Heesters	Comedy	
War of the Maidens	Hermann Kugelstadt	Oskar Sima, Mady Rahl, Gerlinde Locker	Comedy	Co-production with Austria
Widower with Five Daughters	Erich Engels	Heinz Erhardt, Susanne Cramer, Helmuth Lohner	Comedy	
The Zurich Engagement	Helmut Käutner	Liselotte Pulver, Paul Hubschmid, Bernhard Wicki	Comedy	

== Bibliography ==
- Davidson, John & Hake, Sabine. Framing the Fifties: Cinema in a Divided Germany. Berghahn Books, 2007.
- Fehrenbach, Heide. Cinema in Democratizing Germany: Reconstructing National Identity After Hitler. University of North Carolina Press, 1995.

== See also ==
- List of Austrian films of 1957
- List of East German films of 1957
