= Petar Matić =

Petar Matić may refer to:

- Petar Matić Dule (1920–2024), Yugoslav war veteran and general
- Peter Matić (1937–2019), Austrian stage, film, television and voice actor
- Petar Matić (businessman) (born 1966), Serbian businessman and amateur racing driver
- Petar Matić (Serbian actor) (1894–1966), from A Child of the Community, Atomic War Bride, Destination Death, Prvi građanin male varoši
