= Bally Prell =

German singer

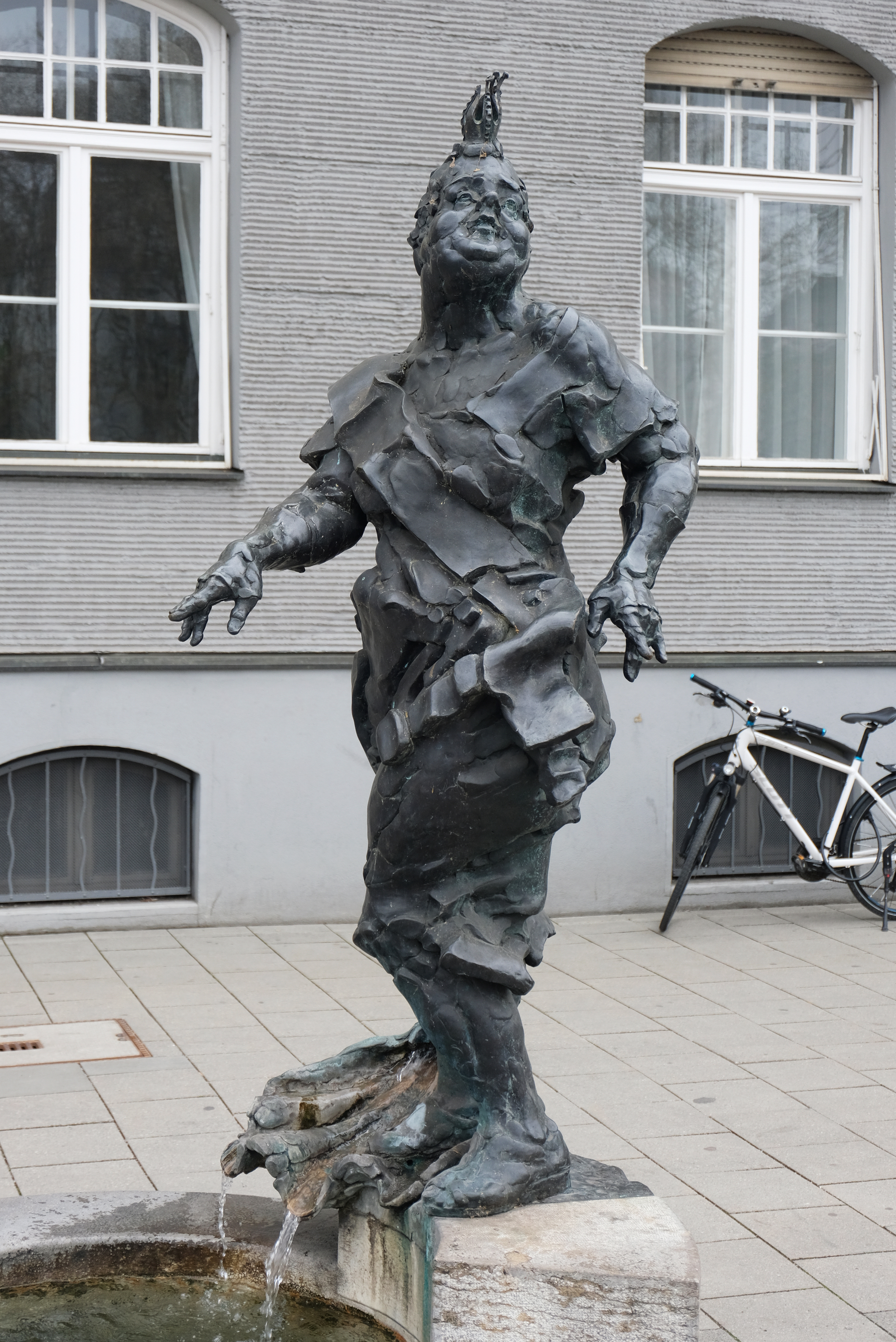
- Bally Prell fountain in Munich

Background information
- Born: Agnes Pauline Prell; 14 September 1922; Schwabing, Germany
- Died: 20 March 1982 (aged 59)
- Genres: Folk music, classical aria
- Occupations: Singer, actress, comedienne

Bally Prell (born Agnes Pauline Prell; 14 September 1922 – 20 March 1982) was a German performer, humorous singer, and folk singer, who performed mainly in Bavarian language.

== Life ==
Prell was the daughter of folk singer and composer Ludwig Prell on Leopold Street 77 in Schwabing, a district in the Bavarian capital of Munich, where she lived her entire life. As early as five years old, she performed at the Odeon hall in Munich and wowed the audience with her voice. Her voice was a low tenor/baritone, and she sang some classical arias in that register.

On 31 October 1953, she appeared for the first time in Munich's Platzl with her song, "Die Schönheitskönigin von Schneizlreuth" ("The Beauty Queen of Schneizlreuth"). The song used Prell's unusual vocal range and decidedly un-beauty queen-like appearance to caricature the emerging beauty craze. The program included the music composed by her father "Isarmärchen". Prell remained connected to the Platzl the rest of her life.

In 1956 and 1957, she appeared in films, such as in Marriages Forbidden as a carnival singer and in Two Bavarians in the Harem as Leila, Rose of the Night.

Prell died in 1982 from the effects of a goiter operation. She is buried in the Nordfriedhof Cemetery in Munich (grave No. 2-3-5).

== Honors ==
The Munich City Museum has an exhibit in Prell's honor, with original items from her famous stage costume including the floral ruffle dress, beach umbrella, fingerless gloves, beauty crown, and the white-blue scarves imprinted with "Miss Schneizlreuthn".

A fountain in her honor, designed by Wolfgang Sand, was erected in 1992 in front of her house in the Leopoldstraße.

On 14 June 2007 the Munich City Council named a new street after Prell. The street is in a new development in the Lochhausen district.
