= Karl Lieffen =

German actor

- Born: 17 May 1926; Ossegg (Osek), Czechoslovakia
- Died: 13 January 1999 (aged 72); Starnberg, Germany
- Occupation: Actor
- Years active: 1949–1998

Karl Lieffen (17 May 1926 – 13 January 1999), born Karel František Lifka, was a German film actor. He appeared in more than 140 films on screen and television between 1949 and 1998.

== Biography ==
He was born in Ossegg (Osek), Czechoslovakia and attended drama classes at Brunswick and the Heer School of Music in Bückeburg. In 1946 he started his theatre career in Freiburg followed by engagements at the Hessian State Theatre in Wiesbaden, the Munich Kammerspiele and the Opern- und Schauspielhaus Frankfurt. In 1975 he joined the ensemble of the Bavarian State Theatre (Residenz Theatre) in Munich. From the 1950s on Lieffen became known to a wider public for his film appearances, like the role of the brisk chauffeur Fritz in Billy Wilder's One, Two, Three. He died in Starnberg, Germany.

== Selected filmography ==
- Encounter with Werther (1949) - Bediensteter Bursche
- Sensation in Savoy (1950)
- The Beggar Student (1956) - Major Wangenheim
- Haie und kleine Fische (1957) - Dr. Timmler
- Eva küßt nur Direktoren (1958) - Herr Fuchs
- Mikosch, the Pride of the Company (1958) - Stabsarzt
- Resurrection (1958)
- Wir Wunderkinder (1958) - Wehackel (uncredited)
- A Song Goes Round the World (1958) - Pianist Schlange
- Nick Knatterton’s Adventure (1959) - Nick Knatterton
- Dorothea Angermann (1959)
- Melodie und Rhythmus (1959) - Otto Mattusch
- The Beautiful Adventure (1959) - Fotograf Fortuné Tallon
- The Death Ship (1959) - Belgischer Kripobeamter
- The Man Who Walked Through the Wall (1959) - Herr Hintz - der Dandy
- Love Now, Pay Later (1959) - Zuhälter
- Ein Tag, der nie zu Ende geht (1959) - McGlade
- Orientalische Nächte (1960) - Pierre
- Der Schleier fiel (1960) - Populescu
- Conny and Peter Make Music (1960) - Grossi
- A Woman for Life (1960) - Magier
- Die Brücke des Schicksals (1960)
- Agatha, Stop That Murdering! (1960) - Thomas Lorenzen
- The Time Has Come (1960, TV series) - Pelford
- Hamlet (1961) - Osric
- Lysistrata (1961) - Dr. Hellwig
- Die Ehe des Herrn Mississippi (1961) - Santamaria
- One, Two, Three (1961) - Fritz
- Toller Hecht auf krummer Tour (1961) - Moritz
- Wenn beide schuldig werden (1962) - Ulbach, Landtagsabgeordneter
- Verrückt und zugenäht (1962) - Kralle Kaktus, Gewohnheitsganove
- The Pirates of the Mississippi (1963) - Doc Monrove
- Walt Disney's Wonderful World of Color (1963, Episode: "The Waltz King") - Stieglitz
- Piccadilly null Uhr zwölf (1963) - Lee Costello
- The Defector (1966) - Major Windisch
- When Night Falls on the Reeperbahn (1967) - Karlchen Dincke
- Jack of Diamonds (1967) - Helmut
- Heidi (1968, TV Movie) - Sebastian
- Dem Täter auf der Spur (1968–1973, TV Series) - Inspecteur Janot
- Should a Schoolgirl Tell? (1969) - Grundeis, Prosecutor
- Angels of the Street (1969) - Radensky
- Don't Get Angry (1972) - Max
- Derrick (1974–1998, TV Series) - Lagusta / Johannes Brusius / Heinrich Gruga / Herr Sparke (final appearance)
- Tadellöser & Wolff (1975, TV Mini-Series) - Karl Kempowski
- Goetz von Berlichingen of the Iron Hand (1979) - Assessor Olearius
- It Can Only Get Worse (1979) - Dr. Kornsack
- Ein gutes Land (1982)
- Lass das – ich hass das (1983) - Onkel Franz
- The Roaring Fifties (1983) - Major Blaschenko
- Die leichten Zeiten sind vorbei (1983)
- Otto – Der Film (1985) - Floppmann
- Nägel mit Köpfen (1986) - Industrieller
- Die Wächter (1986, TV miniseries) - Doctor White
- Rudy, the Racing Pig (1995) - Buselmeier
- Rohe Ostern (1996) - Grandpa Gustav
