= The Time Has Come (TV series) =

- Genre: Crime drama
- Written by: Francis Durbridge; Marianne de Barde
- Directed by: Hans Quest
- Starring: Jürgen Goslar; Eva Ingeborg Scholz; Peter Pasetti; Inge Egger
- Composer: Peter Thomas
- Country of origin: West Germany
- Original language: German
- No. of series: 1
- No. of episodes: 6

Production
- Production company: Nord und Westdeutscher Rundfunkverband

Original release
- Network: ARD
- Release: 21 October – 7 November 1960

The Time Has Come (German: Es ist soweit) is a 1960 West German crime television series broadcast on ARD in six episodes. It was shot at the Bavaria Studios and on location in Britain. It was part of a group of Strassenfeger, popular crime series which cleared the streets as the entire population watched them. It was one of several Francis Durbridge adaptations to be produced in West Germany.

== Cast ==
- Jürgen Goslar as Clive Freeman
- Eva Ingeborg Scholz as Lucy Freeman
- Peter Pasetti as Lawrence Hudson
- Siegfried Lowitz as Inspektor Kenton
- Ursula Kopp as Anna
- Karl Lieffen as Pelford
- Inge Egger as Ruth Calthorpe
- Fita Benkhoff as Barbara Barstow
- Benno Sterzenbach as Lomax
- Hanns Ernst Jäger as Dr. Robert Stevens
- Kurt Waitzmann as Kommissar Wilde
- Ingeborg Christiansen as Schwester Lynn
- Gaby Jäger as Janet Freeman
- Harald Mannl as Mr. Nelson
- Rolf Weih as Sergeant Davis
- Willy Friedrichs as Sergeant Cross
- Annemarie Holtz as Mrs. Denby
- Werner Lieven as Eddie
- Peter Halliday as George Harris
- Dietrich Thoms as Sergeant Brooks
- Albert Hehn as Jack Stafford
- Klaus W. Krause as Fahrer Wade
- Wolf Petersen as Sergeant Williams

== Bibliography ==
- Martin Compart. Crime TV: Lexikon der Krimi-Serien. Bertz + Fischer, 2000.
