= Edda Seippel =

German actress

- Born: 19 December 1919; Braunschweig, Germany
- Died: 12 May 1993 (aged 73); Munich, Germany
- Occupation: Actress
- Years active: 1937–1992

Edda Seippel (19 December 1919 – 12 May 1993) was a German actress. She appeared in more than 70 films and television shows between 1937 and 1992.

== Filmography ==
Year	Title	Role	Notes
1940	Two Worlds	Anna, Hausmädchen	
1950	The Beautiful Galatea		
1965	Der Kardinal von Spanien	Dona Ines	
1966	No Shooting Time for Foxes	Clara's Mother	
1969	Our Doctor is the Best	Eva-Maria Klarwein	
1971	The German Lesson	Ditte Nansen	TV movie
1975	Tadellöser & Wolff	Grete Kempowski	2 episodes
1976	The Marquise of O	Die Mutter, Die Obristin	
1978	The Pentecost Outing	Frau Schmidt	
1978-1979	Jauche und Levkojen	Baronin Sophie von Quindt	15 episodes
1979-1980	Ein Kapitel für sich	Margarethe Kempowski	3 episodes
1983	The Abduction of the Sabine Women	Friederike Gollwitz	
1983	Spring Symphony	Schumann's mother	
1988	Ödipussi	Mutter Tietze	
1989	With the Next Man Everything Will Be Different	Old Lady	
