= Joachim Wedekind =

- Born: 26 February 1925; Berlin, Germany
- Died: 7 April 1963 (aged 38); Munich, Bavaria, West Germany
- Occupation: Writer
- Years active: 1943-1963 (film & TV)

Joachim Wedekind (1925–1963) was a German screenwriter. He was a specialist in comedies, and worked with a number of directors including Georg Jacoby.

== Selected filmography ==
- Anonymous Letters (1949)
- Professor Nachtfalter (1951)
- Pension Schöller (1952)
- The Landlady of Maria Wörth (1952)
- The Forester's Daughter (1952)
- Secretly Still and Quiet (1953)
- The Divorcée (1953)
- Mask in Blue (1953)
- The Bachelor Trap (1953)
- The Rose of Stamboul (1953)
- Guitars of Love (1954)
- Ten on Every Finger (1954)
- As Long as There Are Pretty Girls (1955)
- Ingrid – Die Geschichte eines Fotomodells (1955)
- I Often Think of Piroschka (1955)
- A Girl Without Boundaries (1955)
- Three Girls from the Rhine (1955)
- The Girl Without Pyjamas (1957)
- Greetings and Kisses from Tegernsee (1957)
- The Ideal Woman (1959)
- A Thousand Stars Aglitter (1959)
- Hello, My Name Is Cox (1959)
- Pension Schöller (1960)

== Bibliography ==
- Noack, Frank. Veit Harlan: The Life and Work of a Nazi Filmmaker. University Press of Kentucky, 2016.
