= A Child of the Community =

- Directed by: Mladomir Puriša Đorđević
- Written by: Mladomir Puriša Đorđević; Miodrag Đurđević; Branislav Nušić (novel)
- Cinematography: Aleksandar Sekulović
- Edited by: Kleopatra Harisijades
- Music by: Lida Frajt
- Production company: Avala Film
- Release date: 25 February 1953
- Running time: 72 minutes
- Country: Yugoslavia
- Language: Serbo-Croat

A Child of the Community (Serbo-Croatian: Opštinsko dete) is a 1953 Yugoslav comedy film directed by Mladomir Puriša Đorđević and starring Viktor Starčić, Elma Karlowa and Aleksandar Stojković.

== Cast ==
- Viktor Starčić as Sima Nedeljković
- Elma Karlowa as Elza
- Aleksandar Stojković as Sveštenik
- Milan Ajvaz as Izaslanik kralja Aleksandra
- Mija Aleksić as Advokat Fića
- Dušan Antonijević as Konobar (I)
- Dejan Dubajić as Karanfilović
- Sima Janićijević as Konobar (II)
- Vuka Kostić
- Ljubica Ković
- Predrag Laković as Bogoslov
- Petar Matić
- Bata Paskaljević as Professor Klavira
- Raša Plaović as Vladika
- Nikola Popović
- Milivoje Popović-Mavid as Artiljerijski kapetan
- Branka Veselinović as Seljanka
- Mlađa Veselinović
- Stevo Vujatović
- Jelena Žigon
- Milivoje Živanović

== Bibliography ==
- Liehm, Mira & Liehm, Antonín J. The Most Important Art: Eastern European Film After 1945. University of California Press, 1977.
