= Michael Poliza =

Michael Poliza (born January 1, 1958) is a German photographer and entrepreneur specializing in wildlife and nature photography.

== Early life ==
Michael Poliza grew up in Hamburg, Germany. A prominent child actor, he appeared in over 100 television shows and films, including Tadellöser & Wolff (1975), Hänsel und Gretel (1971) and Unsere heile Welt (1972) while continuing his schooling. At the age of 17, he left Germany for the USA as an exchange student, where he studied Computer Sciences.

== Entrepreneurship ==
=== 1980s ===
At the age of 23, Poliza founded his first IT company, importing IBM computers to Germany. Three years later, Poliza claims he had already earned his first million dollars as he expanded his business in the IT sector.

=== 1990s ===
In 1997 he sold his IT companies, invested in stock, and began focusing on digital media. When the dot.com crash happened, Poliza lost much of his fortune. With what was left, he bought the boat 'Starship' in 1998. Accompanied by journalists and photographers, he undertook the 'Starship Voyage' to document the state of the world’s wild locations at the turn of the millennium. The book of the voyage, containing 50% pictures taken by him, became a bestseller.

=== 2000s ===
Returning to Hamburg in June 2001, Poliza sold the Starship to the US actor Gene Hackman. Between 2002 and 2009, Poliza lived in Cape Town, South Africa, focusing his attention on photographing in the game reserves and nature parks of Southern Africa. The book AFRICA was launched in 2006, followed by the book EYES OVER AFRICA in 2007. Poliza moved back to Hamburg in 2009, published the book ANTARCTIC, opened a gallery and was named ambassador of the World Wildlife Fund (WWF).

=== 2010s ===
The books South Africa and Classic Africa were published in 2010, KENYA in 2011. Parallel to his photography, Poliza launched a tailored-tour company, Michael Poliza Experiences.

== Books ==
- "Die Reise der 'Starship', In 1000 Tagen um die Welt". Frederking & Thaler, 2001, ISBN 978-3894054502
- "AFRICA". teNeues Publishing Group, June 2006, ISBN 978-3832791278
- "The Essential Africa: The best images from the book AFRICA". teNeues Publishing Group, March 2007, ISBN 978-3832791971
- "Eyes Over Africa". teNeues Publishing Group, September 2007, ISBN 978-3832792091
- "ANTARCTIC - Life in the Polar Regions". teNeues Publishing Group, August 2009, ISBN 978-3832793173
- "SOUTH AFRICA". teNeues Publishing Group, April 2010, ISBN 978-3832793906
- "CLASSIC AFRICA". teNeues Publishing Group, September 2010, ISBN 978-3832793746
- "KENYA". teNeues Publishing Group, October 2011, ISBN 978-3832795849
