= Schneizlreuth =

- Municipality
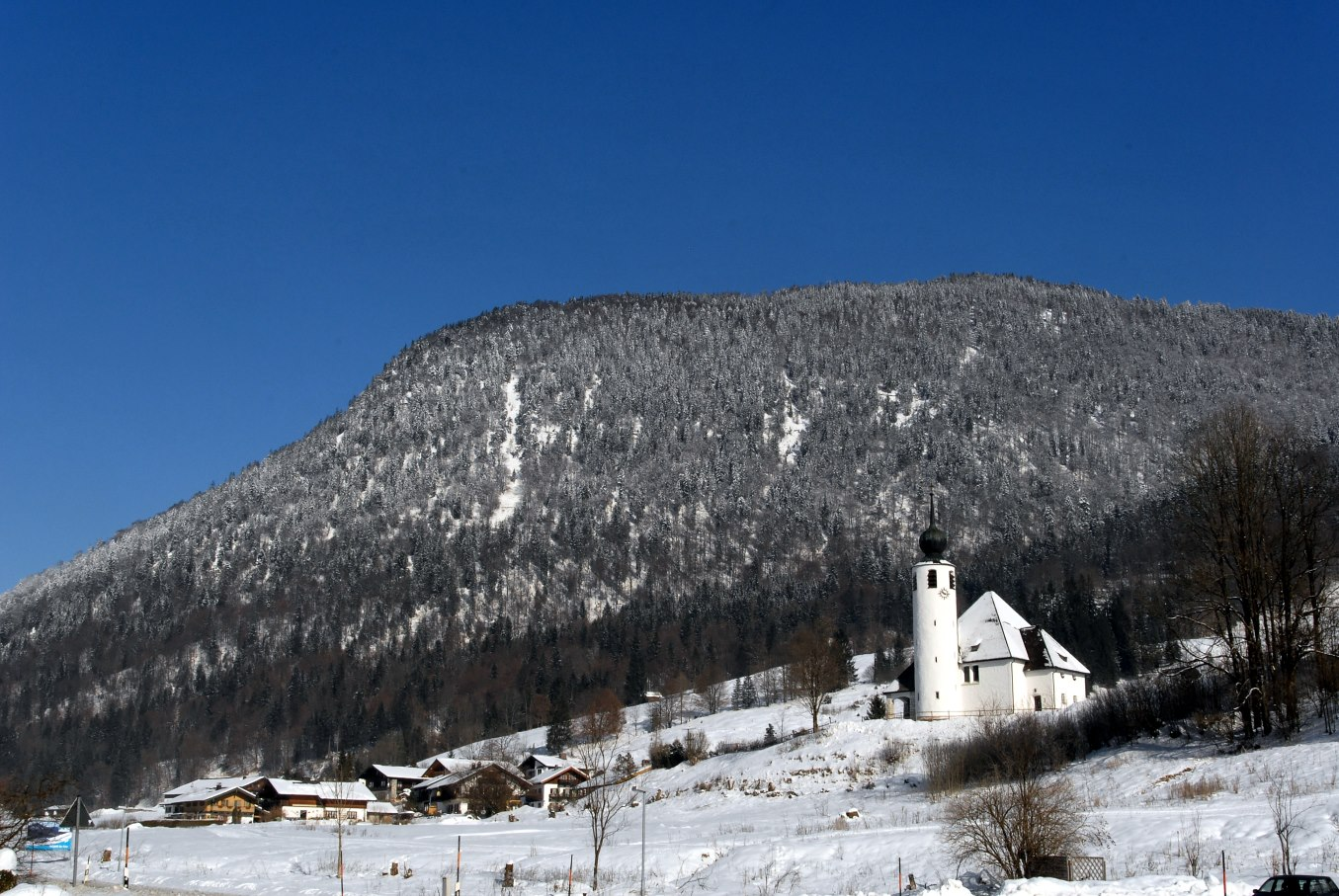
- Saint Vincent Church in Weißbach an der Alpenstraße, municipal part of Schneizlreuth

- Coat of arms

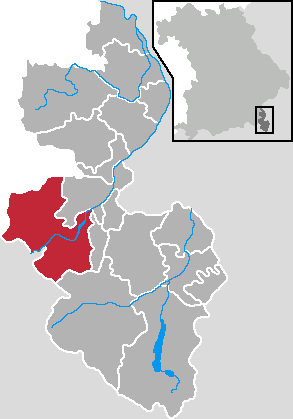
- Location of Schneizlreuth within Berchtesgadener Land district
- Interactive map of Schneizlreuth
- Location within Germany Location within Bavaria
- Coordinates: 47°41′N 12°48′E
- Country: Germany
- State: Bavaria
- Admin. region: Oberbayern
- District: Berchtesgadener Land

Government
  - Mayor (2020–26): Wolfgang Simon (FW)

Area
  - Total: 107.28 km^{2} (41.42 sq mi)
- Elevation: 511 m (1,677 ft)

Population (2025-12-31)
  - Total: 1,373
  - Density: 12.80/km^{2} (33.15/sq mi)
- Time zone: UTC+01:00 (CET)
  - Summer (DST): UTC+02:00 (CEST)
- Postal codes: 83458
- Dialling codes: 08651, 08665 (Ortsteile Weißbach und Jochberg)
- Vehicle registration: BGL
- Website: www.schneizlreuth.de

Schneizlreuth is a municipality in the district of Berchtesgadener Land in Bavaria in Germany.

== History ==
In 1285, an estate in the area was called Schnaezenreut. This is the earliest the town's name can be traced.

The municipality of Schneizlreuth was created on 1 July 1909 by merging the municipalities of Jettenberg (with the districts Oberjettenberg and Unterjettenberg) and Ristfeucht (including Schneizlreuth, then a hamlet). On 5 May 1945, the last battles of World War II that were held in Bavaria took place in Schneizlreuth.

On 1 January 1984, the northern, larger part of the unincorporated area Jette Forst was incorporated into Schneizlreuth, adding an area of 2279.77 hectares. The smaller southern portion with 683.49 acres joined the neighboring village of Ramsau. On 1 January 2011, the eastern portion of Forest St. Zeno (966.50 hectares) was incorporated into Schneizlreuth. The rest of the area, 290.10 acres, was annexed to Bad Reichenhall. Both of these uninhabited, formerly unincorporated areas continue under their former names as districts within the Schneizlreuth municipality.

== Famous citizens ==
- Bally Prell (1922-1982), folk singer, made Schneizlreuth known throughout Germany with her 1953 song about the "Beauty Queen from Schneizlreuth".
