= Alfred Sommerguth =

German Jewish art collector and refugee from Nazis (1859–1950)

Alfred Sommerguth (born September 23, 1859, in Magdeburg; died October 15, 1950, in New York) was a German Jewish art collector and businessman.

== Life ==
Alfred Sommerguth was born on September 23, 1859 in Magdeburg. Director and co-owner of Loeser and Wolff, one of the largest tobacco factories in pre-WWII Germany, he became an official in the Ministry of the Interior in Berlin in 1920, overseeing town planning. He and his wife, Gertrude Sommerguth, were well-known figures in Berlin society and amassed a diverse art collection, including Dutch and Italian Renaissance masterpieces and works by French Impressionists.

== Nazi persecution ==
When the Nazis came to power in Germany in 1933, the Sommerguths were persecuted due to their Jewish heritage.

Sommerguth was forced to register his assets and compile a list of his artworks for the Nazi authorities. To pay the “flight tax” imposed by the Nazis on Jews, Sommerguth was forced to sell most of his art collection at the February 7, 1939 Hans W. Lange auction titled Eine Berline Privatsammlung. In 1941, to avoid deportation, the couple fled to Cuba, where Alfred was hospitalized for typhus before ultimately settling in New York.

Alfred Sommerguth died in New York on October 15, 1950, and his wife Gertrude died on April 8, 1954. They never recovered their art collection during their lives.

== Art restitution ==
In recent years, their heirs, with the help of representatives, have successfully recovered several artworks sold at the 1939 Lange auction. “Madame La Suire” by Swiss painter Albert von Keller was located in the Kunsthaus Zurich. "Boulevard Montmartre, Twilight" by Pissarro was found in the Barberini Museum. Claims for both paintings resulted in settlements.

The Sommerguth heirs are still looking for more than 90 artworks lost in the Holocaust including a still life by Jan van Os (or Pieter van Os), eleven paintings and 29 drawings by Adolph Menzel, four paintings by Max Liebermann, a landscape entitled At the lake of Thun by Ferdinand Hodler and many more.
