= Tadellöser & Wolff =

1975 television film directed by Eberhard Fechner

- Written by: Eberhard Fechner
- Directed by: Eberhard Fechner
- Country of origin: Germany
- Original language: German

Production
- Cinematography: Gero Erhardt
- Editor: Barbara Grimm
- Running time: 192
- Production company: Polyphon Film- und Fernsehgesellschaft

Original release
- Network: ZDF
- Release: 1 May – 3 May 1975

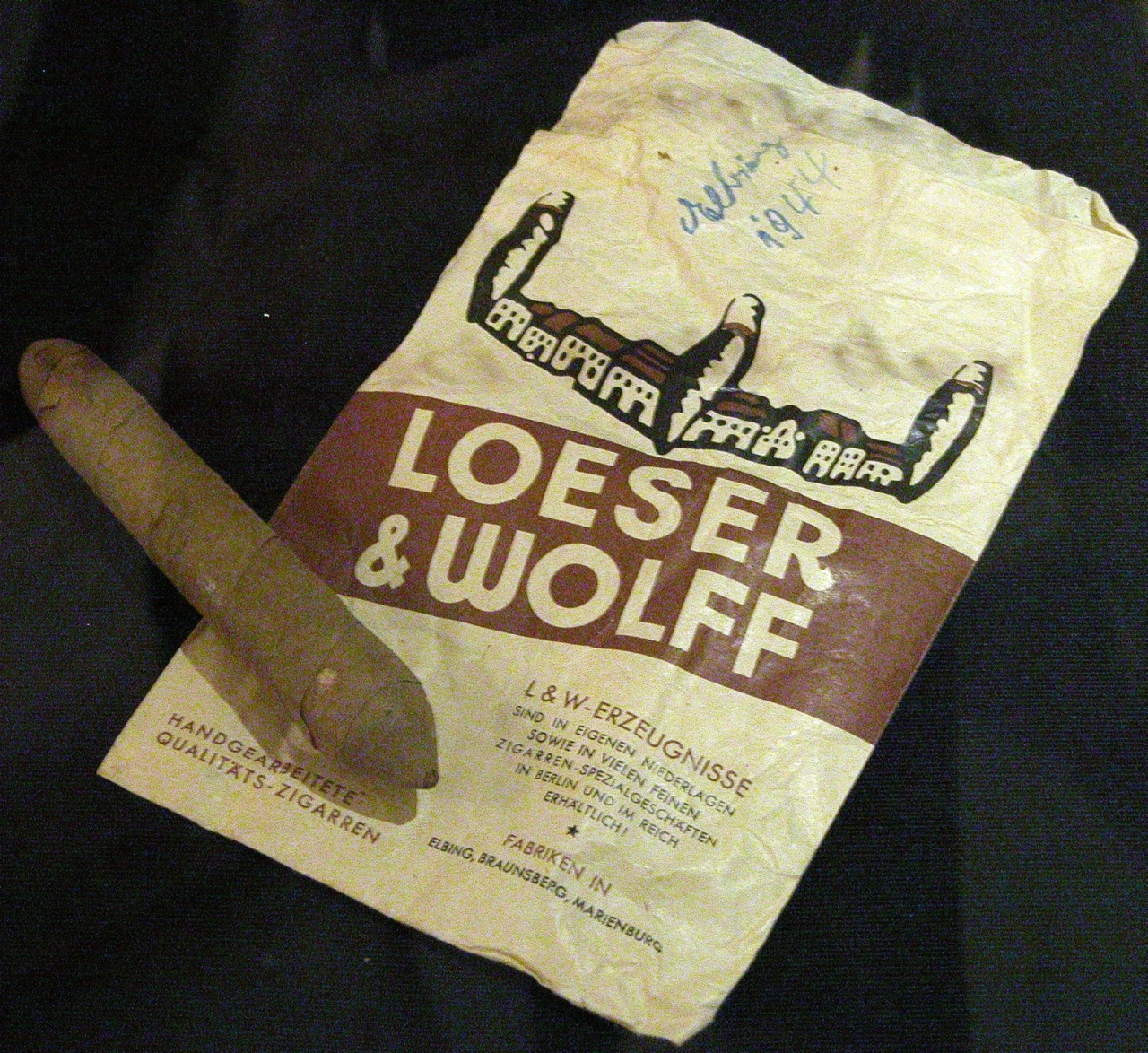
Paper bag from the cigar company Loeser & Wolff with advertising and a cigar. Handwritten note: "Elbing 1944".

Tadellöser & Wolff is a 1975 two-part television film which was produced for the German public-service TV-broadcaster ZDF in sepia. It is based on the 1971 book of the same name by Walter Kempowski. The first broadcast took place on 1 and 3 May 1975. The film was a great success in Germany.

== Plot ==
The film begins similar to a documentary: Ernst Jacobi in the role of a mature Walter Kempowski, introduces the viewer to the action with family photos and pictures from Rostock. As a result, Jacobi occasionally comments on the film plot from offscreen.

The film portrays the life of the middle-class Kempowski family in Rostock from 1939 to 1945, closely following the narration in the novel. The protagonist is Walter, aged 9 when the film opens. In addition to describing the special events in the life of Walter and his family, there are also depictions of everyday life, such as walks with his father Karl through Rostock, activities in school and a Hitler Youth group, Walter's friends and his interest in swing music, family meals and Christmas celebrations, going to church or to the cinema. His father Karl loves cigars from the company "Loeser & Wolff", which, when praised, always prompts him to say "tadellos, tadellöser, Tadellöser und Wolff" (translated: "impeccable, impeccable, impeccable and Wolff").

The story begins when the Kempowski family moves into a new apartment in Rostock on 16 April 1939. This is followed by descriptions of the situation in the new apartment and family events, a meal together, a visit to Walter's paternal grandfather, and a scene with the neighbor's daughter.

During a dinner, Karl announces a vacation trip. The family travels to the Harz mountains on 10 August 1939, where they stay in the home of a military officer. There they get the news of an impending war, whereupon they leave prematurely.

Soon after the family's return, the grandfather dies. In reviewing the estate, considerable debts are found and must be repaid. As a result, the family cannot move into the grandfather's villa, but rents it out. Walter gets sick on Christmas Day. The doctor diagnoses scarlet fever and suggests a recovery period of six weeks.

Later, Walter takes piano lessons. The piano teacher is strict and Walter does not seem to have practised enough. Nevertheless, in 1941 he plays the piano at a Hitler Youth Christmas party in the Rostock City Theater.

There is a heavy aerial bombing attack on Rostock. Walter's mother, Grete is assigned as an air-raid warning officer and sends the residents of the house down to the basement. When the bombings end, the apartment building is only slightly damaged, but some bombs have hit in the street. Walter's brother Robert, who was on the road as a responder in the city, tells his family about the reports he made on the considerable destruction in Rostock, and that the Selters water factory in the neighborhood has burnt down.

Sven Sörensen is a Danish employee in the father's office. He is arrested by the Gestapo for tracing successful bombings on a city map. Grete goes to the Gestapo to get him released, which happens shortly afterwards. He moves into the Kempowski family's apartment because his own apartment was destroyed by the bombing.

Walter's father Karl is a first lieutenant in the Wehrmacht, the German military. When he comes home from the front on leave, there are initially tensions in the family, which eventually calm down. Since Walter's achievements in school have deteriorated considerably, it is decided that he has to go to a tutor, the very strict Anna Kröger, called Aunt Anna.

Walter's sister Ulla and Sven Sörensen get married in May 1943. The racial laws do not pose any difficulties for the young couple, as Sven is "Northerner". The wedding celebration, which many relatives attend, takes place in the Kempowski family's apartment. The food has been obtained on the black market, because of the war economy.

Ulla and Sven move to Denmark. The family says goodbye to them at the train station on the train to Copenhagen. The family members remaining in Rostock are sad on the one hand about the farewell, but on the other hand are also happy because Ulla is now in a safe place.

During the school holidays in 1944, Walter spends three weeks at the Gut Germitz estate. This estate on Plauer See belongs to the family of Ferdinand von Germitz, whom he knows from tutoring at Anna Kröger. During his stay, he gets to know Greta, Ferdinand's sister.

Karl comes home again on leave in October 1944. Due to the current war situation, the mood during his stay is already very sad. At the end of Karl's leave, Walter and his mother say goodbye to him at the train station. From there, he returns to his military posting with the future uncertain.

Walter's maternal grandfather has lost his house in Hamburg, destroyed by the bombing of Hamburg. The grandfather comes to Rostock and stays at the family's home. A refugee, Frau Stoffel, is also billeted with them.

On 17 February 1945, Walter is drafted into the military. He works as a courier. In mid-April 1945, while on an assignment in Berlin, he realizes that the Soviet (Red Army Soldiers) have come very close to the city. He looks for a way out of the city and manages to find a train to Rostock in Nauen (Brandenburg). He arrives in Rostock on 25 April 1945. The film ends showing the situation on 1 May 1945, the day of the end of World War II. Walter sits on the balcony with his mother and grandfather and sees the Soviet soldiers for the first time, as they march down their street in Rostock.

== Cast ==
- Edda Seippel as Margarethe Kempowski
- Karl Lieffen as Karl Kempowski
- Michael Poliza as Walter Kempowski (as a teenager)
- Martin Kollewe as Walter Kempowski (as a child)
- Martin Semmelrogge as Robert Kempowski
- Gabriele Michel as Ulla Kempowski
- Jesper Christensen as Sven Sörensen
- Ernst Jacobi as Narrator / mature Walter Kempowski
- Ernst von Klipstein as Grandfather de Bonsac
- Helga Feddersen as Anna Kröger
- Gert Haucke as Dr. Fink
- Marianne Kehlau
- Inge Landgut

== Filming ==
The entire film was shot in color. Fechner deliberately chose sepia as a stylistic device to give the film more authenticity. The shooting took place in October 1974 partly in Börßum (Lower Saxony), Lüneburg, Eckernförde and Hamburg-Harburg.

== Movie Score ==
The basic musical theme of the film with the text "Years of Life; all in vain. When will we see each other again? ", was delivered within the first movement of the 6th Symphony in B minor, op. 74, by Peter Tchaikovsky. In the course of the film, the jazz classic Georgia on My Mind by Hoagy Carmichael is played in several scenes.

== Critics ==
- „The cast also appears to be optimal: How Edda Seippel plays mother Kempowski's oppressively unsuspecting indestructibility, how she nags her notorious "No, how it is now possible": how Martin Semmelrogge puts down the sekundaner's elan of the son Robert; how Karl Lieffen, here a disciplined comedian, lets the funny father cracking his jokes and in the end even imbues him with a trace of tragedy as his jokes becomes stale under the war experience – "Prime"! "
- „ A film is shown – the director: better not imaginable; the actors: accomplishing the feat of showing individuals who are exemplary – people who, unmistakable in their independence, nevertheless function as character masks – a film that, in the past, also means the present. The perfect, show Kempowski and Fechner, is an imperfect. The action is still ongoing. The K. family has not changed in its structure. The film's leitmotifs point beyond the piece and show that it can be repeated at any time. The social-Darwinian pattern of thought of this family remains dominant.“

== Sequel ==
In 1979, also under Fechner's direction, the three-part continuation of the Kempowskian family history appeared under the title "Ein Kapitel für sich" (A chapter for itself).
