= Nick Knatterton's Adventure =

1959 film

Nick Knatterton’s Adventure
- Directed by: Hans Quest
- Written by: Werner P. Zibaso
- Based on: Nick Knatterton by Manfred Schmidt
- Produced by: Erwin Gitt
- Starring: Karl Lieffen; Susanne Cramer; Maria Sebaldt
- Cinematography: Heinz Hölscher
- Edited by: Elisabeth Kleinert-Neumann
- Music by: Willy Mattes
- Production company: Deutsche Film Hansa
- Distributed by: Deutsche Film Hansa
- Release date: 15 January 1959
- Running time: 89 minutes
- Country: West Germany
- Language: German

Nick Knatterton's Adventure (German: Nick Knattertons Abenteuer - Der Raub der Gloria Nylon) is a 1959 West German comedy crime film directed by Hans Quest and starring Karl Lieffen, Susanne Cramer and Maria Sebaldt. It is based on a comic strip portraying the private detective Nick Knatterton. It was made at the Göttingen Studios with location shooting took place around Kassel in Hesse.The film's sets were designed by the art director Walter Haag.

== Synopsis ==
Gloria Nylon, daughter of a famous fabric manufacturing tycoon, is kidnapped. The press demand that celebrated detective Nick Knatterton be called in on the case.

== Cast ==
- Karl Lieffen as Nick Knatterton
- Susanne Cramer as Gloria Nylon
- Maria Sebaldt as Virginia Peng
- Gert Fröbe as Hugo
- Günter Pfitzmann as Max
- Hans von Borsody as Eddie
- Stanislav Ledinek as Gustav
- Wolfgang Wahl as Tresor-Otto
- Gert Wiedenhofen as Bobby Schnieke
- Martin Hirthe as Lucius Xaver Nylon
- Herta Konrad as Trudchen Taste
- Werner Fuetterer as Redakteur
- Wolfgang Müller as Graf Rieselkalk
- Wolfgang Neuss as Diener bei Graf Rieselkalk

== Bibliography ==
- Bock, Hans-Michael & Bergfelder, Tim. The Concise CineGraph. Encyclopedia of German Cinema. Berghahn Books, 2009.
