= An Ordinary Youth =

1971 novel by Walter Kempowski

- Book cover in German language, Tadellöser & Wolff (1971)
- Author: Walter Kempowski
- Original title: Tadellöser & Wolff
- Translator: Michael Lipkin
- Language: German
- Publisher: Goldmann, NYRB Classics (English)
- Publication date: 1971
- Publication place: West Germany
- English publication date: 2023
- Pages: 476 (1980 German edition)
- ISBN: 9783442038923

An Ordinary Youth (German: Tadellöser & Wolff) is a semi-autobiographical novel by the German writer Walter Kempowski, first published in West Germany in 1971. It was first translated into English by Michael Lipkin for NYRB Classics in November 2023.

The novel follows a middle-class family with three children from Rostock, Germany, centered around the nine-year-old Walter Kempowski in 1938 until the end of World War II in 1945. The original German title is a pun on a cigar brand (Loeser & Wolff) and the word for impeccable (tadellos), a family saying meaning that "everything's perfect".

== Plot ==
The novel opens as the Kempowski family are moving into their new apartment in Rostock, Germany, in 1938. The protagonist, Walter Kempowski, is nine years old. His sister, Ulla, is sixteen, and his brother Robert is fifteen. His father Karl is a World War I veteran, ship owner and operator of a shipping company, and his mother Grete is a housewife. The young Walter is introduced to his new neighbors and makes friends with Ute, the daughter of the Woldermann family. He spends time playing with her and his siblings, often listening to American jazz with his brother, and visiting his elderly grandfather with his siblings to get money to visit the cinema. Walter eventually starts attending secondary school and playing with his friends from there, often with toy soldiers. He is also inducted into the Hitler Youth, attending sessions twice a week.

Towards the end of a family vacation, the German invasion of Poland begins and the family decides to return home. The Woldermann family, including Ute, decide to leave for Berlin until the war calmed down in a few months. Shortly afterwards, Walter's grandfather dies, and his parents have to deal with the grandfather's home and debts; they start renting out the house to make up the money. Around Christmas that year, Walter contracts scarlet fever and becomes gravely ill for over a month.

In the new year, Walter eventually starts taking piano lessons with a very strict teacher, whom he dislikes. Ute and her family eventually return from Berlin. Air raid sirens eventually become commonplace. Eventually, after praying for one to begin to interrupt his lessons, a bombing raid begins on Rostock. The families hide in a bomb shelter in the basement of the apartment. The city is heavily damaged in the raid, although the Kempowski's apartment is mostly unscathed. The family temporarily leaves the city to avoid further risk of injury in raids.

After returning, a Dane working for Karl's company, Sörensen, is arrested by the Gestapo for suspicion of spying and spends two weeks in prison. Grete and an employee from Karl's company successfully petition for his release. He moves in with the Kempowski family because his home had been destroyed. He eventually becomes romantically interested with Ulla and Karl later begins to approve of him, being Nordic. They later marry and leave for Copenhagen. At the same time, Walter begins to struggle with his schoolwork and starts getting tutoring.

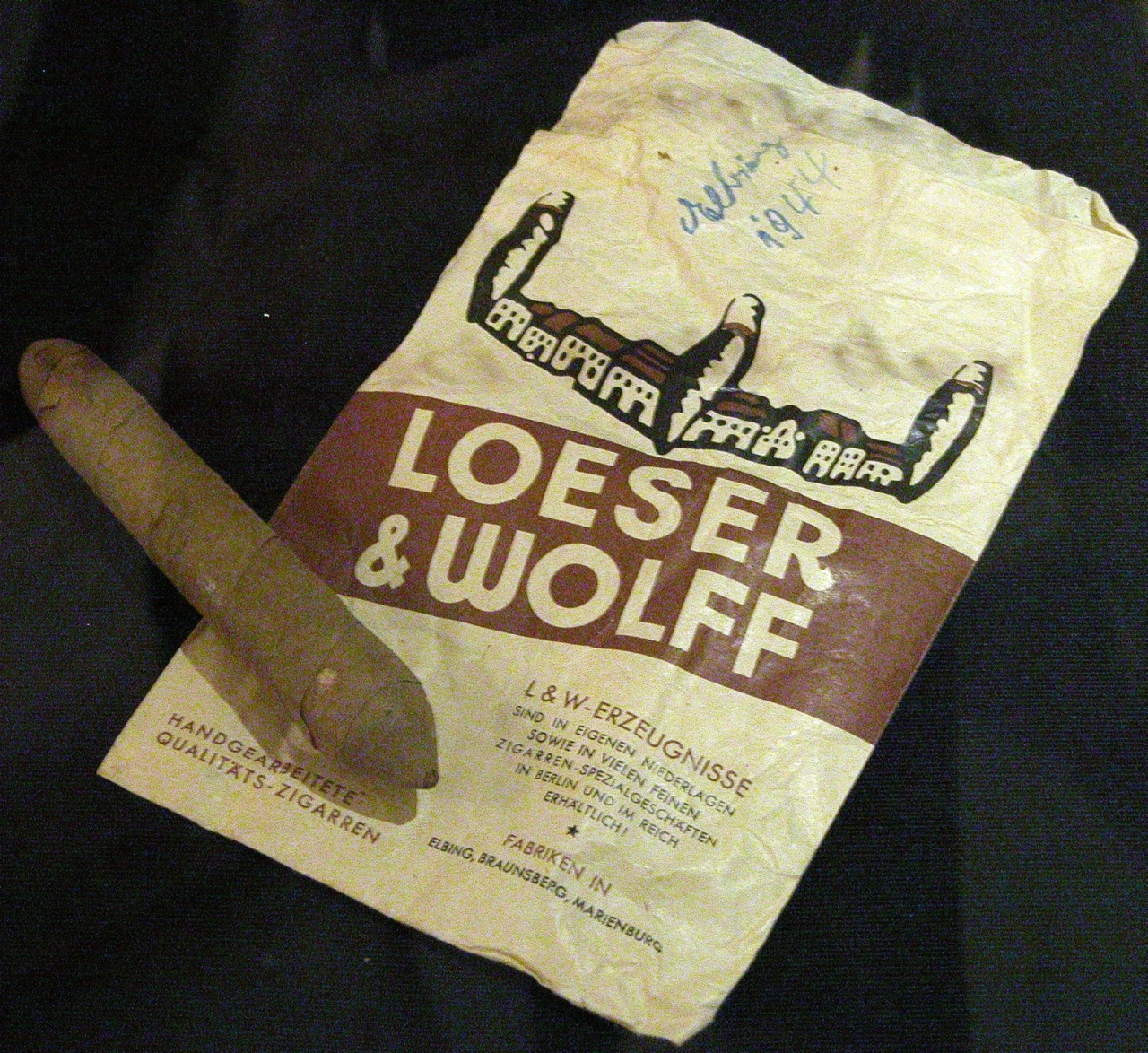
Paper bag and cigar from the company Loeser & Wolff

While his mother is recovering from surgery and his father is gone with military duties, Walter is sent to live with his cousins and other grandfather in Hamburg. When Hamburg is bombed, he returns home. Later, he visits the family of one of his classmates from tutoring in Brandenburg. While here, he explains the meaning of the cryptic phrase Tadellöser & Wolff, meaning "everything's perfect".

As the war progresses, Robert is drafted and Walter is consigned to a remedial branch of the Hitler Youth due to disobedience. Throughout the winter of 1944–1945, coal is rationed at home and a refugee mother and son stay at their house for approximately a month before being made to move on. In February, Walter himself is drafted into the military, where he works as a courier across Germany. After months of service, Walter is given leave until October for medical reasons. In April he visits Berlin to pick up medicine for the town dentist. Walter spends more time than necessary in Berlin, often visiting the cinema or wandering the streets. He suddenly realizes the Russian front is closing in and decides to leave, but trains are cancelled. He eventually manages to make it home, losing most of the medicine. The novel ends with Robert and Karl missing, and Walter and Grete heading inside as Russian gunfire closes in on the city.

== Style and themes ==
An Ordinary Youth is written in a semi-fragmentary style, consisting of individual, interrelated scenes, interrupted by song lyrics, street writing, and quotes from advertisements. Much of the novel is based upon Kempowki's real life experience, although an epigraph says that "All details [are] completely made up". The presentation as a series of vignettes without much context between them gives the novel a fast pace and sense of immediacy. Music is a recurring theme throughout, with Walter and his elder brother being shown to appreciate jazz, which is frowned upon by authorities.

Explicit acknowledgements of the real political situation are rare. Although the reader is expected to know the realities of The Holocaust, the novel is framed from the point of view of a child unable to completely comprehend the surrounding world. Grim or darkly ironic moments are often shown with no further elaboration. Kristallnacht is only alluded to via Walter noticing smashed windows of a Jewish businessman's home in November 1938. The only mention of Auschwitz was from Walter's grandfather reading a newspaper's miscellaneous section; it was included as a reminder by Kempowski to prevent readers from feeling "self-pity" over the concurrent bombing raids in Germany.

The translator, Michael Lipkin, faced some difficulty in translating the novel into English due to obscure German cultural and political references, untranslatable puns, and heavy use of the German subjunctive mood to report dialogue without using quotes, often resulting in ambiguity. Explanatory footnotes were added for many historical references and song titles, and much of the dialogue was changed to use quotation marks and explicitly identify the speaker.

== Reception ==
An Ordinary Youth was a best seller when it was first released in Germany in 1971.

The Wall Street Journal praised An Ordinary Youth for "brilliantly capturing the delusions of a nation" as the war approached its conclusion, as well as the way Lipkin translated the use of reported speech into English. Kirkus Reviews appreciated the "great deal of wisdom and even emotional depth" the book offered, but found the long length and lack of "honest, straightforward reckoning with the war" tiring.

The Irish Times listed the novel as one of the best works of fiction in translation from 2023, and The Sunday Times as one of the best works of historical fiction of the year.
