= Nick Knatterton =

German comic strip

Cover of a German collected edition of Nick Knatterton comics.

Nick Knatterton is the name of a West German comic strip and the name of its main character, a private detective. The strip was drawn by Manfred Schmidt (1913–1999) from 1950 to 1959.

It was initially released in the German magazine Quick.

The visual style of the comics is cartoony, but still realistic enough for the comic to be taken as a (at least mostly) serious detective comic. It is characterised by its unique style of humour, most of which derives from allusions to current political affairs in the Federal Republic of Germany of the 1950s.

== History ==
The character Nick Knatterton was created in 1935, when Schmidt wrote and drew a detective story called "Der Hilferuf der Maud O'Key" to the weekly magazine Die Grüne Post, with the events located in Chicago in the United States. The main character was called Nick Knatterton, and he already had the famous chin and a chequered coat. The character next appeared in the magazine Die Landpost in 1946; the story was called "Der Schuß in den künstlichen Hinterkopf", German for "The shot in the artificial back of the head".

Schmidt recalled that in 1950 he came into possession of a Superman comic brought from the United States and started parodying the way the comic was narrated:

Soon after the war I got my hands on a colourful comic brought from the United States, which was called Superman. The comic had a visual story where bubbles filled with text came out of people's mouths, noses, ears and foreheads depending on what they said, heard, smelled or even thought. Swirls around a person's head meant they were losing consciousness, and stars represented a blow to the chin or other sensitive body part. The course of the events, which would fill many pages in a novel, was concentrated into one small picture, saving almost 95 percent of the reading time. I decided to start parodying this completely primitive style of storytelling so thoroughly that no one would care about such bubble-filled stupid literature meant for illiterates. (Manfred Schmidt in 1970.))

This explanation can not be seen as entirely truthful, as Schmidt had already drawn comics since his childhood and also used speech bubbles in an experienced manner. Another story tells that some time around 1946 Schmidt had received an issue of the American comic Classics Illustrated containing a comic based on a novel by Charles Dickens. Schmidt's friend viewed comics as an art form of the future, and so Schmidt became interested in the matter, became familiar with Superman, changed the beginning of the story "Der Schuß in den künstlichen Hinterkopf" to a more comic-like fashion and offered it to the magazine Quick where he had submitted caricatures. The editor Anton Sailer accepted the submission and the comic started being published as a continuing story.

The comic soon became popular, and only a few people realised it was a parody of comics. At first Schmidt only wrote parody into the comic, but soon he started inserting satirical references to daily politics and the community life of the two German countries. Sometimes Schmidt even quite directly attacked Konrad Adenauer, Franz Josef Strauss and Erich Mende in his stories. The collected publications of Nick Knatterton are still missing four pages that have not been seen since 1957 - apparently because Strauss engages in questionable arms trade in them. These pages were shown at Schmidt's 100th anniversary exhibition in the Hannover comics museum.

The comic also had merchandising (playing cards, colouring books, masks etc.) and the stories were published in foreign magazines. The comic was published for many years, but creating new stories became increasingly more difficult for Schmidt:

I sat desperately at my drawing board (also called a "torture bench" by my family) from morning to evening trying to invent new and dangerous situations for Knatterton. This process took more and more time. When I was thinking of things that could happen to a person, I started seeing a seed of disaster in every item and in every harmless situation.

== Character ==
The name Nick Knatterton is an allusion to Nick Carter and Nat Pinkerton. Both of these were present in adventures in pulp action literature in the early 20th century, which was among the favourites of Schmidt in his school days.

Nick Knatterton's full name is Nikolaus Kuno Freiherr von Knatter. He was born in Kyritz (also called "Kyritz an der Knatter") to Casimir Kuno von Knatter and Corinna Pimpsberg.

Knatterton always dresses in a Sherlock Holmes-style green plaid overcoat and cap, and smokes a pipe. His overcoat is based on Sherlock Holmes as seen in the 1930s, as Schmidt has mentioned the character as being inspired by Holmes played by Hans Albers in the 1937 film The Man Who Was Sherlock Holmes.

He is presented as the embodiment of a competent and effective private detective. He is not extraordinarily physically strong (although he keeps in good shape) and does not possess many fancy gadgets, but his mental capabilities, such as his power of deduction, his senses, his memory and knowledge of various topics, are incredibly good, to the point of caricature. As an example, Knatterton was once able to pinpoint his location after being thrown tied and blindfolded into the back of a van, thanks to memorising the entire map of the city and feeling the van's momentum with his body when turning corners.

Knatterton's eyesight is sharp enough to see fingerprints on a windowsill without using any accessories, and he has memorised the map of the city and all of its criminals. Knatterton is a sworn pacifist, and although he prefers to beat his enemies with a single well-aimed punch to the chin to using weapons, he mostly prefers non-violent solutions with clever gadgets. His selection of gadgets include an artificial back of the neck, steel-reinforced trouser bottoms and a fake beard containing a parachute. Later on, the character James Bond took Knatterton's tricks to a "highest and even seriously meant perfection".

== Humour ==
The irony and metafiction in the series are based on narrative text boxes used by Schmidt, explaining and commenting on the actions in the comic; often these explanation appear as useless or even absurd. There often is an arrow leading out of the text box, showing ironically accurately where the explanation applies to, and Schmidt used this to parody the comic narrative. Often these explanations use the we voice: "As the device is as opaque as the bureaucracy of the government, we show a cut-away view." Sometimes the text box itself is explained by another text box. At the time, text boxes in comics were peculiar and unusual forms of narrative, and they can be compared to instructions, where pictures and words complement each other.

Another technique favoured by Schmidt was cut-away views. The working of machines and structures is shown in detail with cut-away views, showing their futuristic and unrealistic nature. The naïve enthusiasm of the drawings comments on the technical development optimism of the 1950s.

== Plots ==
Knatterton's cases often involve wealthy aristocratic families with a public image to maintain. Many of the villains are recurring characters and acquainted with Knatterton and his clients, and they are usually good at heart, make up with their victims after being arrested. The stories usually have a happy ending.

Female characters are often drawn as bombshells.

The stories are located in Germany, in various places in Europe and in the American Old West. At first the location of Nick Knatterton's home was stated as "the corner between Baker Street and Hollywood Street". This address referred to the background of the character: the stories make fun of Sherlock Holmes as well as the United States - especially action-filled, sensational American crime adventures, where the main characters end up in dangerous situations which they escape from with some imaginative trick.

The Quick magazine published colourful visual reports from all over the world, and Nick Knatterton's adventures satisfied the longing for travel of the readers as well as the other stories in the magazine did. In the 1950s, trips abroad were only distant dreams for many Germans.

A recurring location in the stories is the Alibi Bar, a bar favoured by various shady characters. The handles on the bar's front door are shaped like section signs ("§"). In many stories, Knatterton has found out the real situation and been able to complete his deductions when visiting the Alibi Bar, where he sometimes finds a wealthy family's teenage daughter and the man who stole her jewelry wrapped up in each other's arms.

Characters in the stories include the gullible model Molly Moll (using the name Dolly Dur as a singer), the Alibi Bar's hostess Virginia Peng, Juwelen-Juppe and the inventor Professor Bartap. The police are not on unconditionally friendly terms with Knatterton but instead often make fun of him. The comic sometimes even refers to the police as "the violence of the government". Also the tax office is often the subject of jokes. Many victims or commissioners of crimes are of the upper class or persons in prominent positions. Knatterton's cases sometimes end up in a kind of agreement and mutual understanding. The artist Max Wachs also appears in some stories.

== 1955 indecency controversy ==
In 1955 Manfred Schmidt drew ten advertisement pictures based on Nick Knatterton for an advertisement campaign at the city of Munich to advertise the city's swimming pools. These pictures were printed on the back of tram tickets. Some of the pictures contained double entendres typical of Knatterton. In June 1955 the newspaper Abendzeitung reported that these drawings had caused a "storm of objections" as teachers believed they had a negative effect on the school youth. Centa Hafenbrädl, a member of the city council from the Christian Social Union in Bavaria, accused the drawings of having "too much sex and too little good taste". The mayor general suggested that all the rest of the tickets would be immediately cancelled, but that would have cost the city a loss of 8 thousand Deutsche Marks. So the city council left the matter alone.

The official Zentralstelle zur Bekämpfung unzüchtiger Bilder, Schriften und Darstellungen made a criminal report of the city of Munich, as these drawings were seen as indecent and harmful to the youth. The youth psychologist Hans Luxemburger working as an expert in the case said that these drawings could under no circumstances be seen as harmful to the youth, and the investigation ended at that point.

== TV series ==
Nick Knatterton's adventures were translated into many languages, and a television cartoon series was produced in 1978 by the creator's own studio. All 15 episodes of the show were created by Slovenian artist Miki Muster and are available on DVD not only in Germany but also dubbed in Finland where it earned a Gold Record in three months. The show is narrated, with the narrator being in fact the only voice actor. Characters merely squeak when they are shown talking, and the narrator then explains what was said. Knatterton himself often voices out the conclusions of his deductions by saying "Conclusion" (German: "(Ich) kombiniere!", literally: "I'm concluding!", Finnish: "Johtopäätös!"), followed by the conclusion itself. This has become a kind of catchphrase for him.

== Films ==
The comic has been adapted into two films:

- Nick Knatterton’s Adventure (1959)
- Nick Knatterton – Der Film (2002)

== Radio dramas ==
2007 and 2008 German based Der Audio Verlag published Nick Knatterton radio dramas in German.

- Nick Knatterton – Der indische Diamantenkoffer (March 2007)
- Nick Knatterton – Der Schuß in den künstlichen Hinterkopf (March 2007)
- Nick Knatterton – Die Million im Eimer / Das Geheimnis hinterm Bullauge (February 2008)
- Nick Knatterton – Die Erbschaft in der Krawatte (February 2008)

== See also ==
- German comics
