= Christiane Maybach =

German actress (1932–2006)

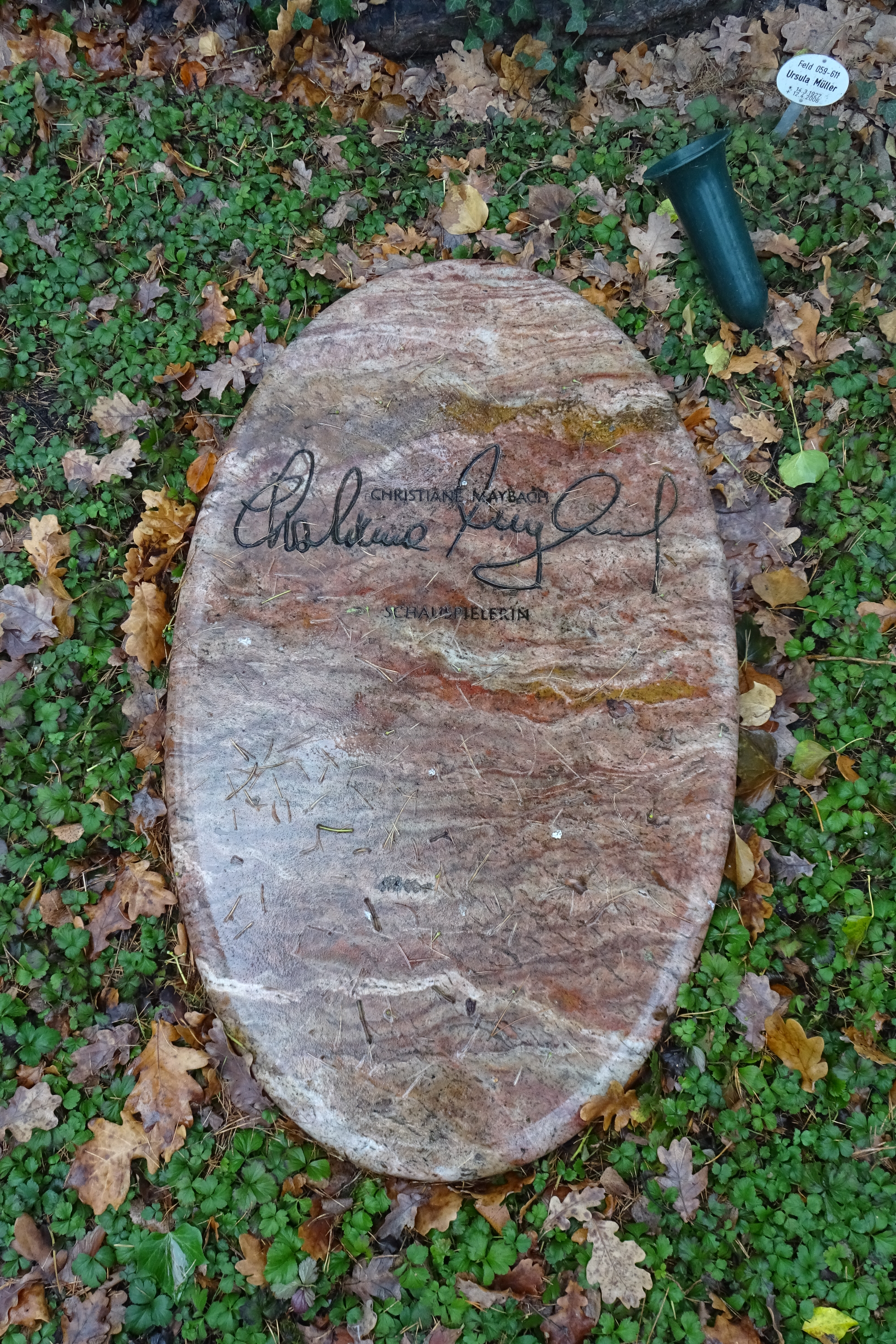
- Born: 14 March 1932; Berlin, Germany
- Died: 12 April 2006 (aged 74); Cologne, Germany
- Other name: Uschi Müller
- Occupation: Actress
- Years active: 1951–2005 (film & TV)

Christiane Maybach (1932–2006) was a German film and television actress. She became known as "Berlin's Marilyn Monroe" due to work in films from the 1950s to the 1970s. She continued to act in television roles until shortly before her death in 2006.

== Life ==
Maybach was born in Berlin, Germany on March 14, 1932, was educated at the acting school of the Schillertheater beginning in 1956, and worked on the stage before becoming a film actress during the 1950s, a career she continued to pursue until the 1970s. She then continued her acting career on television, performing until shortly before her death. She died in Cologne, Germany on April 12, 2006.

== Selected filmography ==
- Fanfares of Love (1951) - (uncredited)
- I Lost My Heart in Heidelberg (1952) - Rita, Studentin
- Fireworks (1954) - Jasmine (uncredited)
- Heimatland (1955) - Lisa
- In Hamburg When the Nights Are Long (1956)
- Musikparade (1956) - Helga
- Ein Mann muß nicht immer schön sein (1956) - Otti Springfeld
- Frauen sind für die Liebe da (1957) - Schütze Sabine
- The Girl Without Pyjamas (1957) - Marion Klenk
- Das Glück liegt auf der Straße (1957) - Sylvia
- Two Bavarians in the Harem (1957) - Bardame Cora
- Greetings and Kisses from Tegernsee (1957) - Steffi
- Wenn die Bombe platzt (1958) - Lilly
- Hoppla, jetzt kommt Eddie (1958) - Lilli
- Sehnsucht hat mich verführt (1958) - Elvira
- Der lachende Vagabund (1958) - Diana
- Stefanie (1958) - Gabriele
- The Head (1959) - Stella - alias Lilly
- Heimat, deine Lieder (1959) - Beate, Pauls Verlobte
- The High Life (1960) - Tilly Scherer
- The Thousand Eyes of Dr. Mabuse (1960) - Maid (uncredited)
- One Prettier Than the Other (1961) - Dorothee Liebig
- Axel Munthe, The Doctor of San Michele (1962) - Paulette
- Escape from East Berlin (1962) - Frau Eckhardt (uncredited)
- Es war mir ein Vergnügen (1963) - Maria Rivaldi
- Das Haus auf dem Hügel (1964) - Marion, Bardame
- That Man in Istanbul (1965)
- A Study in Terror (1965) - Polly Nichols
- El marqués (1965) - The blonde
- Z7 Operation Rembrandt (1966) - Consuela
- Top Crack (1967)
- Weiße Haut auf schwarzem Markt (1969)
- The Bordello (1971) - Tilly
- $ (1971) - Helga
- Naughty Nymphs (1972) - Tante Lilofee
- All People Will Be Brothers (1973) - Die Rote
- Fox and His Friends (1975) - Hedwig
- Satan's Brew (1976) - Agentin, Agentur Milutinovic
- Game of Losers (1978) - Frau Holle
- Just a Gigolo (1978) - Gilda
- Die unglaublichen Abenteuer des Guru Jakob (1983) - Gräfin Falkenberg
- Die Story (1984) - Verlegerin
- Das Wunder (1985) - Raoul's mother
- The Venus Trap (1988)

== Bibliography ==
- Kalat, David (2005). The Strange Case of Dr. Mabuse: A Study of the Twelve Films and Five. Jefferson, NC: McFarland. ISBN 978-1-4766-0107-6.
