= Two Bavarians in the Harem =

1957 film directed by Joe Stöckel

- Directed by: Joe Stöckel
- Written by: Jochen Genzow; F.M. Schilder
- Produced by: Jochen Genzow
- Starring: Joe Stöckel; Beppo Brem; Lucie Englisch
- Cinematography: Erich Claunigk
- Edited by: Adolf Schlyssleder
- Music by: Peter Igelhoff
- Production company: Regina Film
- Distributed by: Prisma Film
- Release date: 26 September 1957
- Running time: 82 minutes
- Country: West Germany
- Language: German

Two Bavarians in the Harem (German: Zwei Bayern im Harem) is a 1957 West German comedy film directed by Joe Stöckel and starring Stöckel, Beppo Brem and Christiane Maybach. It was one of three sequels made to the 1956 hit Two Bavarians in St. Pauli.

== Cast ==
- Joe Stöckel as Jonathan, ship's cook
- Beppo Brem as Michel, coxswain
- Johannes Riemann as Hieronymus Walden
- Christiane Maybach as Bardame Cora
- Walter Buschhoff as Halim Pascha
- Elfie Fiegert as Ali, Turkish shoeshine girl
- Helga Franck as Kathi, Walden's granddaughter
- Arnim Dahl as Toni, Kathi's fiancé
- Kurt Großkurth as Selam, upper eunuch
- Albert Hehn as Aristoteles Xylander, private detective
- Elfie Pertramer as Lucie, Nurse at Walden
- Bally Prell as Leila, die Rose der Nacht

== Bibliography ==
- Beni Eppenberger & Daniel Stapfer. Mädchen, Machos und Moneten: die unglaubliche Geschichte des SchweizerKinounternehmers Erwin C. Dietrich. Verlag Scharfe Stiefel, 2006.
