= The Girl Without Pyjamas =

1957 film

- Directed by: Hans Quest
- Written by: Joachim Wedekind
- Produced by: Gero Wecker
- Starring: Ingeborg Christiansen; Bert Fortell; Elma Karlowa
- Cinematography: Fritz Arno Wagner
- Edited by: Margot Jahn; Caspar van den Berg
- Music by: Werner Müller
- Production company: Arca-Film
- Distributed by: Constantin Film
- Release date: 2 May 1957
- Running time: 92 minutes
- Country: West Germany
- Language: German

The Girl Without Pyjamas (German: Das Mädchen ohne Pyjama) is a 1957 West German comedy film directed by Hans Quest and starring Ingeborg Christiansen, Bert Fortell and Elma Karlowa.

== Cast ==
- Ingeborg Christiansen as Irma
- Bert Fortell as Eddy Blohm
- Elma Karlowa as Eva
- Bum Krüger as Egon Bruchsal
- Christiane Maybach as Marion Klenk
- Gunther Philipp as Dr. Engelbert Moll
- Willi Rose
- Oskar Sima as Direktor Klenk
- Alice Treff as Frau Schickedanz
- Erika von Thellmann as Tante Wilhelmine
- Charlotte Witthauer as Fräulein Rübsahm
- Wolfgang Völz as Assistant von Dr. Moll

== Bibliography ==
- Horst O. Hermanni. Das Film ABC Band 5: Von La Jana bis Robert Mulligan.
