= Herta Konrad =

Austrian actress (1928–2005)

- Born: 6 January 1928; Vienna, Austria
- Died: 14 August 2005 (aged 77)
- Occupation: Actress
- Years active: 1954–1978

Herta Konrad (6 January 1928 – 14 August 2005) was an Austrian stage, film and television actress.

== Death ==
Konrad died on August 14, 2005, at the age of 77. The news was made public in 2016 through a letter from her lawyer Aldo Allidi in Ascona, Switzerland.

== Selected filmography ==
- Cabaret (1954)
- Marriages Forbidden (1957)
- Candidates for Marriage (1958)
- Nick Knatterton's Adventure (1959)

== Bibliography ==
- Francesco Bono. Willi Forst: ein filmkritisches Porträt. 2010.
