= Ludmila Frajt =

Ludmila Frajt (31 December 1919 – 14 March 1999) was a Yugoslav and Serbian composer. She wrote choral, orchestral and chamber works, music for films and radio-dramas, electro-acoustic works, as well as music for children. She has won numerous awards for her music for children.

== Biography ==
Ludmila (Lida) Frajt was born in Belgrade, Yugoslavia into a family of musicians. Her father Jovan (Jan) Frajt, born in 1882 in Plzeň (nowadays in the Czech Republic), settled in Serbia in 1903. He worked as a violinist, organist, conductor, composer and music publisher. He founded a publishing house Edition Frajt in Belgrade. After his death in 1938, his son Stevan Frajt, also a musician, continued to run this family business.

Ludmila Frajt received her first music lessons at home; then she attended the Belgrade Music School, where one of her teachers was Josip Slavenski. In 1938 she enrolled to study composition at the newly founded Belgrade Music Academy (nowadays Faculty of Music), with Miloje Milojević. Her studies were interrupted by the World War II. After the country was liberated, she resumed her study. However, her professor Milojević died in 1946, and therefore she graduated with Josip Slavenski as the first female graduate in composition. (Another prominent Serbian female composer, Ljubica Marić, was educated in Prague).

Aside from their professional relationship, Frajt and Slavenski also developed a close personal friendship, with Slavenski and his wife Milana Ilić serving as witnesses at Ludmila Frajt's wedding to Mile Franović. Unfortunately, Franović was killed at the Syrmian Front, only three years after they got married. After this tragedy, the young widow never remarried.

From 1946 to 1952, Ludmila Frajt was Head of the Music Department at Avala Film; from 1952 to 1958 she was a Deputy Music Editor at Radio Belgrade; and then, from 1958 until retirement, she was the Secretary of the Music Committee of Yugoslav Radio-Television (ЈРТ) in Belgrade. Aside from composing, she was also involved with ethnographic research, and she avidly collected archaic folk instruments.

She died in Belgrade, aged 80.

== Personal style ==
Initially, Frajt's style revolved around a combination of impressionistic sound world, inspired by French composers, and her desire to study and utilise the deepest layers of folklore. This desire was identified and cultivated during her studies with Milojević and Slavenski. After World War II, instead of succumbing to the official demand to write music in accordance with the doctrine of Socialist Realism, Frajt turned to studying Serbian folklore. However, her compositions from this period are not based on quotations of folk music.

In 1960s and 1970s Frajt studied and assimilated the latest compositional techniques of the European musical avant-garde – in particular, aleatorics, the idea of 'open-work' and various multimedia experiments. She mixed and merged these with her already established interest in folklore, rituals and antiquity. Her tendency to employ unusual, quasi-archaic instruments and naturalistic sound effects is notable; some of her works are scored for instruments such as folk pipes, silver spoons and children's toys.

Ludmila Frajt is a pioneer of female writing in the domain of Serbian music. Her discourse is characterised by its chamber qualities, lyricism and subtlety, which can be seen both in the choice of genres and performing forces, and in her compositional procedures. Furthermore, she was fascinated with a female voice (both in solo and choral settings), and she often wrote 'female' vocal genres such as lullaby and threnody.

She died of natural causes in Belgrade.

== Important works ==
- 1953-65 Five Preludes for harp
- 1965 A Strange Musician, symphonic story for children (lyrics by Desanka Maksimović)
- 1966 A Musician and Birds, rhapsody for clarinet and orchestra
- 1967 Asteroids, electro-acoustic music
- 1969 Farewell Songs for mixed chorus (lyrics from folk poetry)
- 1970 Songs of the Night, cantata for female chorus and chamber orchestra (lyrics: composer's own)
- 1971 Lullaby for soprano and children's toys
- 1972 Silver Sounds for string quartet and silver spoons
- 1973 Threnody for female chorus
- 1975 Еclogue for wind quintet, strings and percussion
- 1975 Nocturne, electro-acoustic music
- 1979 Figures in Motion, electro-acoustic music
- 1981 Bells for mixed chorus and tape (lyrics by Zvonimir Brkić)
- 1982 Music for 13 String Instruments

== Bibliography ==
- Petar Bingulac: Writings on Music (Belgrade, University of Arts, 1991).
- Ivana Medić: "Ludmila Frajt. The 'Other' Serbian Composer", in: Sveske no. 77 (September 2005), pp. 208–214.
- Ivana Medić: "Dedicated to Josip Slavenski", in: Mirjana Živković (ed.), Josip Slavenski and his Epoch (Belgrade, Faculty of Music/Serbian Academy of Sciences and Arts/Association of Serbian Composers, 2007).
