= Bert Fortell =

Austrian actor

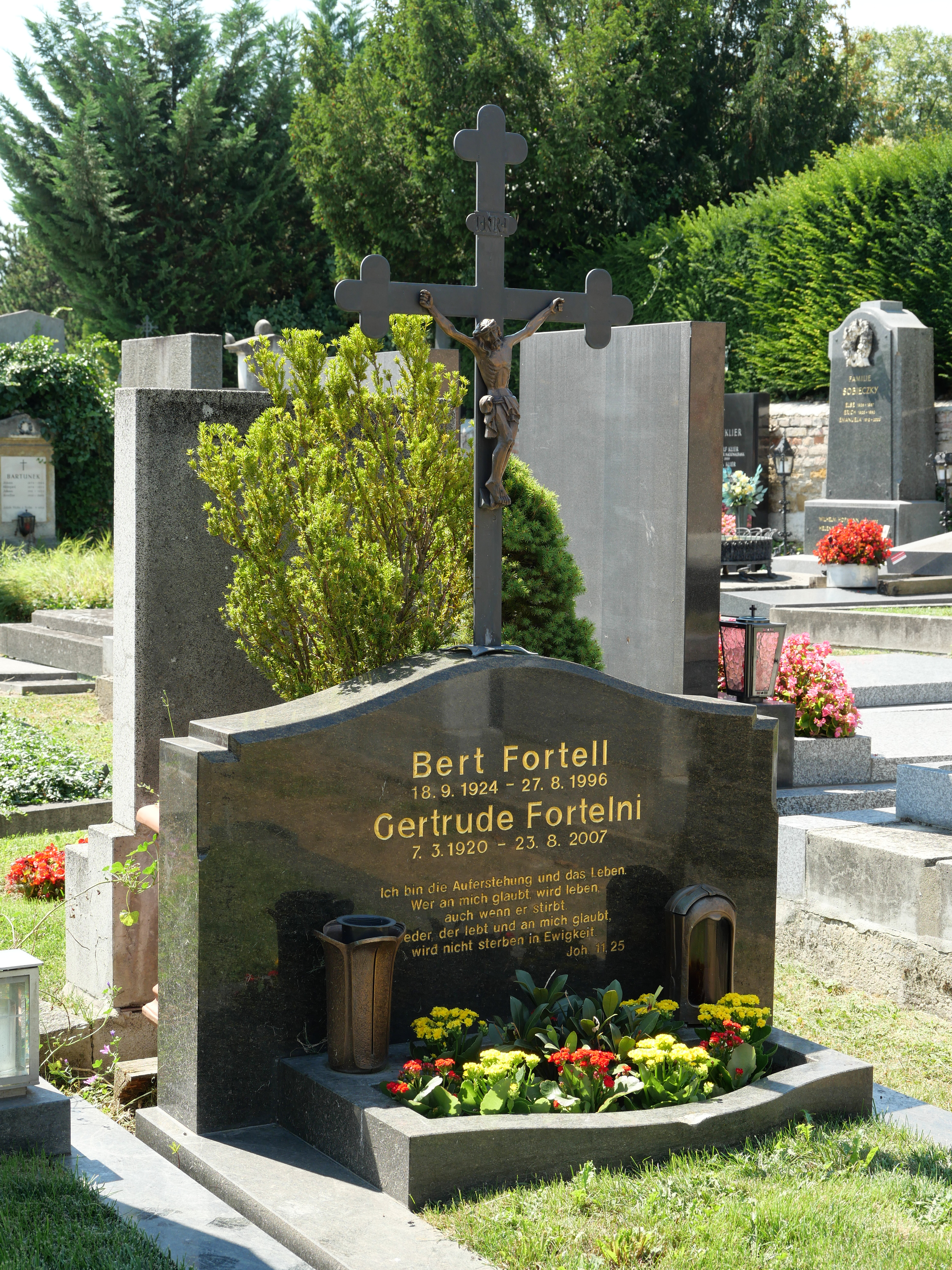
Gravesite of Bert Fortell at the Grinzinger Friedhof in Vienna

Bert Fortell (18 September 1924 – 27 August 1996)) was an Austrian actor.

== Filmography ==
Year	Title	Role	Notes
1953	Arena of Death	Gino Belotti	
1954	Schicksal am Lenkrad	Sepp Springer	
1956	Gasparone	Erminio	
1956	The Czar and the Carpenter	Peter Michailow	
1956	Die fröhliche Wallfahrt	Franzl, ein Bauernbursch	
1957	Mazurka der Liebe	Simon	
1957	The Girl Without Pyjamas	Eddy Blohm	
1957	Two Bavarians in the Jungle	Toni Gschwendner	
1957	Wetterleuchten um Maria	Thomas Sebald	
1957	Greetings and Kisses from Tegernsee	Max	
1957	Almenrausch and Edelweiss	Robert Teichmann	
1958	Blitzmädels an die Front	Obergefreiter Peter Fischer	
1958	Der Sündenbock von Spatzenhausen	Martin	
1960	Ein Student ging vorbei	Albert Brandt	
1960	Twenty Brave Men	Alexandros	
1966	Der Rivonia-Prozess	Leutnant van Wyk	
1970	Josefine Mutzenbacher	Marbach	
1972	The Goalkeeper's Fear of the Penalty	Zollbeamter	
1972	The Salzburg Connection	Rugged Man	
1977	The Chinese Miracle	Theo	
