= Ingeborg Christiansen =

German actress (born 1930)

- Born: 12 November 1930 (age 95); Hamburg, Germany
- Occupation: Actress
- Years active: 1951–1999 (film & TV)

Ingeborg Christiansen (born 12 November 1930) is a retired German film and television actress.

== Selected filmography ==
- Professor Nachtfalter (1951)
- The Mosquito (1954)
- The Fisherman from Heiligensee (1955)
- The Forest House in Tyrol (1955)
- The Girl Without Pyjamas (1957)
- The Mad Bomberg (1957)
- The Time Has Come (1960, TV series)

== Bibliography ==
- Richard Bertrand Dimmitt. An Actor Guide to the Talkies: A Comprehensive Listing of 8,000 Feature-length Films from January, 1949, Until December, 1964, Volume 1. Scarecrow Press, 1967.
