= Elma Karlowa =

Yugoslav actress

- Born: 12 March 1932; Zagreb, Yugoslavia
- Died: 31 December 1994 (aged 62); Munich, Bavaria, Germany
- Other name: Selma-Karolina Karlowac
- Occupation: Actress
- Years active: 1949–1994

Elma Karlowa (12 March 1932 – 31 December 1994) was a Yugoslav film and television actress.

== Selected filmography ==
- Once I Will Return (1953)
- A Child of the Community (1953)
- Guitars of Love (1954)
- Cabaret (1954)
- Love's Carnival (1955)
- Royal Hunt in Ischl (1955)
- The Beggar Student (1956)
- The Girl Without Pyjamas (1957)
- Greetings and Kisses from Tegernsee (1957)
- Almenrausch and Edelweiss (1957)
- The Csardas King (1958)
- Do Not Send Your Wife to Italy (1960)
- The Post Has Gone (1962)
- Holiday in St. Tropez (1964)
- The Eddie Chapman Story (1971, TV film)
- Crime and Passion (1976)
- The Unicorn (1978)
- Doctor Faustus (1982)

== Bibliography ==
- Fritsche, Maria. Homemade Men in Postwar Austrian Cinema: Nationhood, Genre and Masculinity. Berghahn Books, 2013.
