= Greetings and Kisses from Tegernsee =

1957 film

- Directed by: Rudolf Schündler
- Written by: K.H. Butte; Joachim Wedekind
- Produced by: Johannes J. Frank
- Starring: Elma Karlowa; Bert Fortell; Christiane Maybach
- Cinematography: Werner M. Lenz
- Edited by: Johanna Meisel
- Music by: Karl Bette
- Production company: Hans Deppe Film
- Distributed by: Constantin Film
- Release date: 19 December 1957
- Running time: 105 minutes
- Country: West Germany
- Language: German

Greetings and Kisses from Tegernsee (German: Gruß und Kuß vom Tegernsee) is a 1957 West German musical romantic comedy film directed by Rudolf Schündler and starring Elma Karlowa, Bert Fortell and Christiane Maybach. It was part of a large number of heimatfilm pictures produced during the decade. It was shot at the Bavaria Studios in Munich and on location around Tegernsee. The film's sets were designed by the art directors Willi Herrmann and Heinrich Weidemann.

== Synopsis ==
An American daughter of a millionaire hotelier is due to go to finishing school at Bad Wiessee on Lake Tegernsee but wants to head to Paris to meet up with her boyfriend Billy. So she hires Lissy, a music student, to take her place. Lissy succeeds in the impersonation and falls in love with Max, the nephew of the headteacher. Complications ensue when Billy arrives, and having completely forgotten his American girlfriend, falls for Steffi who runs a kiosk.

== Cast ==
- Elma Karlowa as Lissy
- Bert Fortell as Max
- Christiane Maybach as Steffi
- Harald Juhnke as Billy
- Ruth Stephan as Dorothea
- Kurt Großkurth as Amandus
- Monika Dahlberg as Pat
- Lale Andersen as Self - Musician
- Ingrid Dittmar as Elena
- Hansen-Quartett as Singer
- Hans Leibelt as Mr. Hoover
- Harald Martens as Pips
- Franz Schafheitlin as Büroleiter
- Kenneth Spencer as Jimmy
- Jan Troeger as Junger Franzose

== Bibliography ==
- Ludewig, Alexandra. Screening Nostalgia: 100 Years of German Heimat Film. transcript Verlag, 2014.
- Von Moltke, Johannes. No Place Like Home: Locations Of Heimat In German Cinema. University of California Press, 2005.
