= Ingeborg Cornelius =

Austrian stage and film actress (1930–2023)

- Born: 4 January 1930; Vienna, Austria
- Died: 25 September 2023 (aged 93); Munich, Germany
- Occupation: Actress

Ingeborg Cornelius (4 January 1930 – 25 September 2023) was an Austrian stage and film actress. She appeared in a number of heimatfilms during the 1950s, having been discovered by the producer Peter Ostermayr. Cornelius died in Munich on 25 September 2023, at the age of 93.

== Selected filmography ==
- The Violin Maker of Mittenwald (1950)
- The Cloister of Martins (1951)
- The Crucifix Carver of Ammergau (1952)
- The Double Husband (1955)
- Marriages Forbidden (1957)

== Bibliography ==
- Goble, Alan. The Complete Index to Literary Sources in Film. Walter de Gruyter, 1999.
