= Almenrausch and Edelweiss (1957 film) =

1957 film

- Directed by: Harald Reinl
- Written by: Franz Marischka; Ilse Lotz-Dupont; Tibor Yost; Willy Stock; Albert Janschek
- Produced by: Kurt Hammer
- Starring: Elma Karlowa; Karin Dor; Harald Juhnke
- Cinematography: Walter Riml
- Edited by: Eva Kroll
- Music by: Nils Nobach
- Production company: Bergland-Film
- Distributed by: Prisma Film
- Release date: 20 December 1957
- Running time: 85 minutes
- Countries: Austria; West Germany
- Language: German

Almenrausch and Edelweiss (German: Almenrausch und Edelweiß) is a 1957 Austrian-West German comedy film directed by Harald Reinl and starring Elma Karlowa, Karin Dor and Harald Juhnke. It is part of the postwar tradition of Heimatfilm.

The film's sets were designed by the art director Felix Smetana. Location shooting took place in Bavaria, Upper Austria and Switzerland.

== Cast ==
- Elma Karlowa as Ilonka Ferency
- Karin Dor as Maresi Meier
- Bert Fortell as Robert Teichmann
- Harald Juhnke as Max Lachner
- Paul Westermeier as Generaldirektor Ferdinand Meyer
- Maria Andergast as Friedl Meier
- Joseph Egger as Förster Fenninger
- Theodor Danegger as Hotelportier Xandl
- Theo Lingen as Kammerdiener Leo Amadeus Schulze

== Soundtrack ==
- Das Hansen-Quartett - "Der starke Max aus Halifax"
- Elma Karlowa and Harald Juhnke dubbed by Das Hansen-Quartett - "Ich tanz heut ohne Schuh"
- Das Hansen-Quartett - "Liebling, denk an Mich" (Music by Gert Wilden)

== Bibliography ==
- Anthony Bushell. Polemical Austria: The Rhetorics of National Identity from Empire to the Second Republic. University of Wales Press, 2013.
