= Helga Franck =

German actress

- Born: 1933; Lübeck, Schleswig-Holstein, Germany
- Died: 1963 (aged 29–30); Munich, West Germany
- Occupation: Actress

Helga Franck (1933–February 1963) was a German stage and film actress.

Having appeared in a number of 1950s film productions, including the 1957 heimatfilm Marriages Forbidden, her career was cut short when she accidentally fell to her death from a window.

== Selected filmography ==
- On the Reeperbahn at Half Past Midnight (1954)
- Two Bavarians in the Harem (1957)
- Marriages Forbidden (1957)
- Horrors of Spider Island (1960)

== Bibliography ==
- Torsten Körner. Der kleine Mann als Star: Heinz Rühmann und seine Filme der 50er Jahre. Campus Verlag, 2001.
