= Walter Kempowski =

German writer (1929–2007)

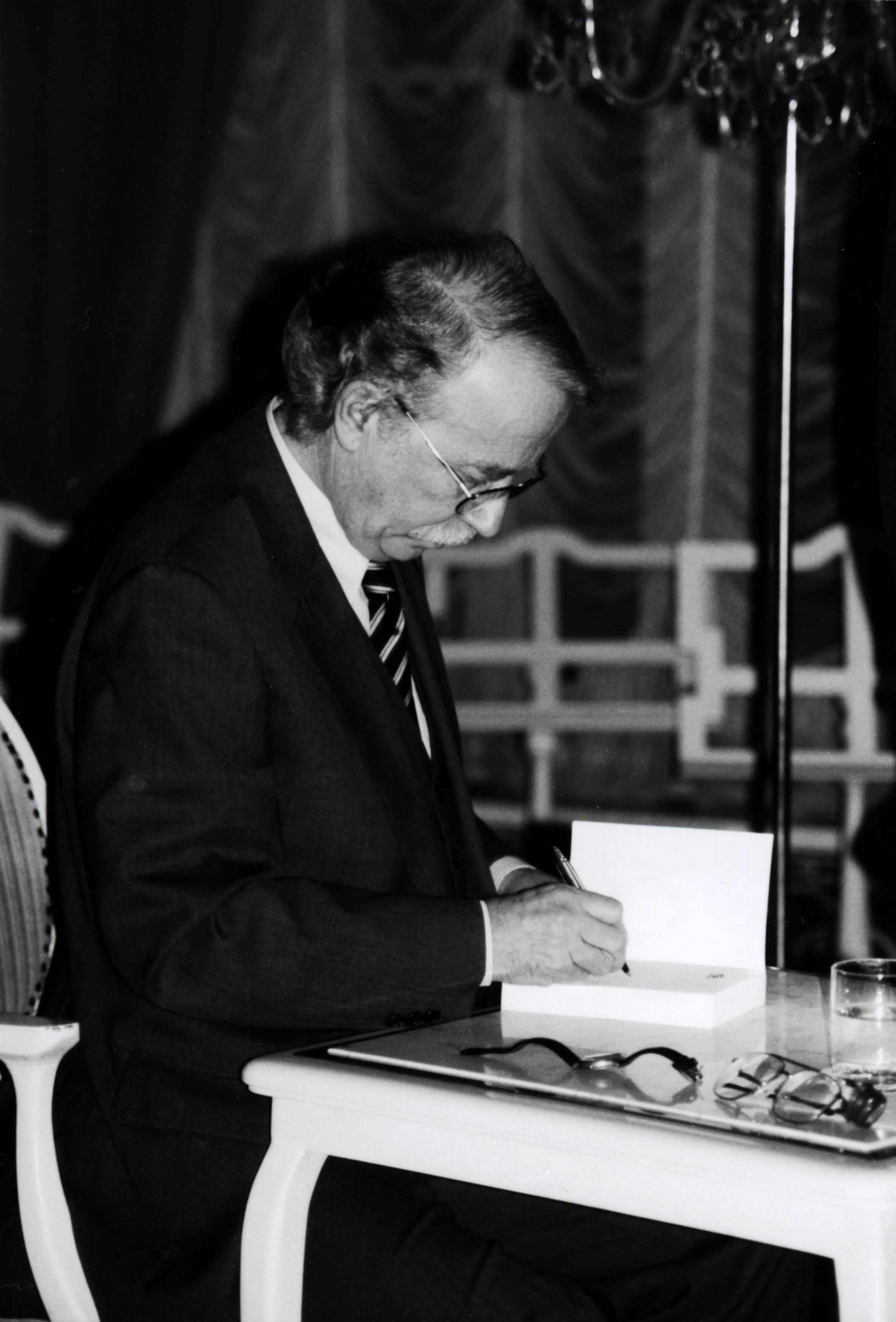
- Born: 29 April 1929; Rostock, Germany
- Died: 5 October 2007 (aged 78); Rotenburg an der Wümme, Germany
- Occupations: Writer; chronicler; historian
- Writing career
- Notable work: German Chronicle (1993–2005); Swansong 1945 (2014); All for Nothing (2015); Homeland (2018)

Signature
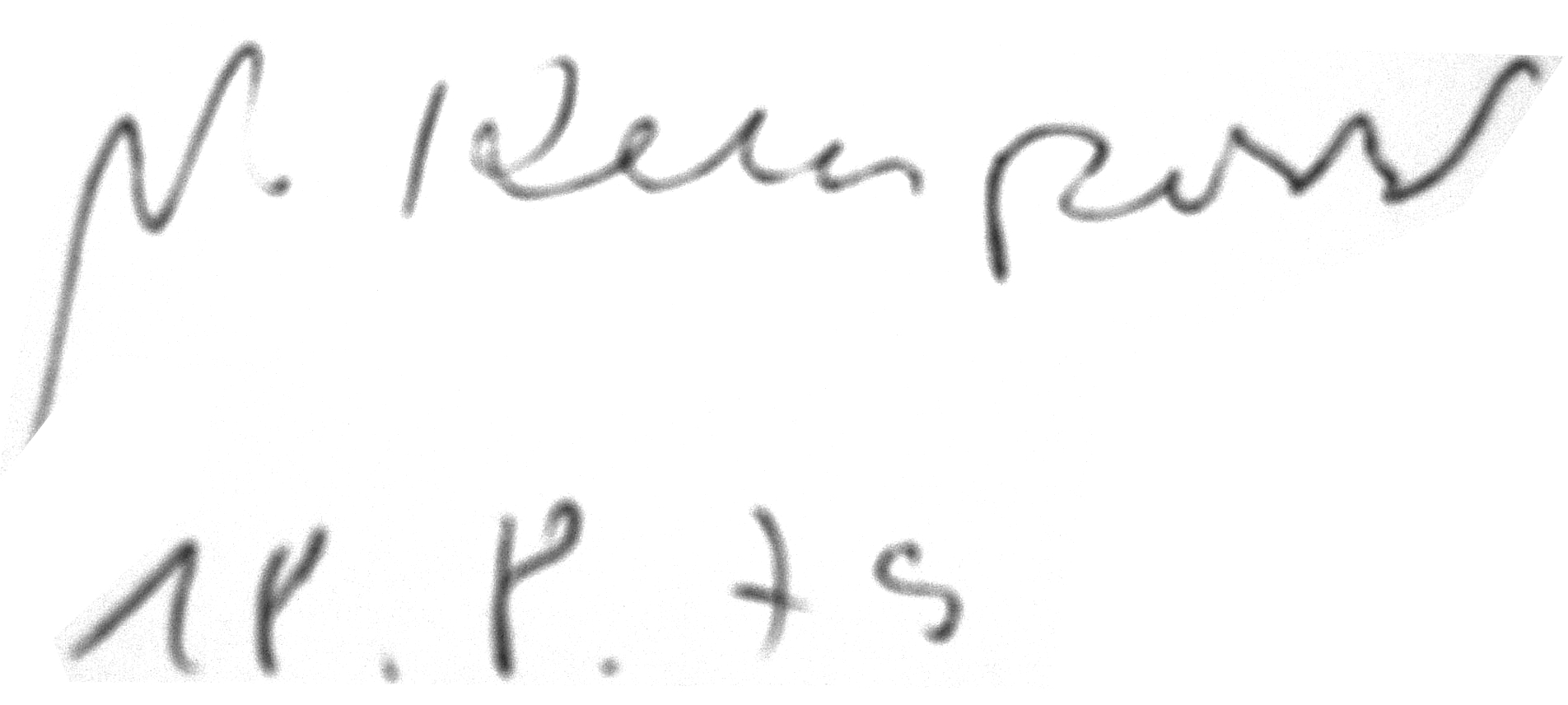

Walter Kempowski (German pronunciation: [ˈvaltɐ kɛmˈpɔfskiː]; 29 April 1929 – 5 October 2007) was a German writer. Kempowski was known for his series of novels called German Chronicle ("Deutsche Chronik") and the monumental Echolot ("Sonar"), a collage of autobiographical reports, letters and other documents by contemporary witnesses of the Second World War.

== Life ==
=== Childhood (1929–39) ===
Kempowski was born in Rostock. His father, Karl Georg Kempowski, was a shipping company owner and his mother, Margarethe Kempowski, née Collasius, was the daughter of a Hamburg merchant. In 1935 Kempowski began attending St. Georg School; in 1939, he transferred to the local high school ("Realgymnasium").

=== During World War II (1939–45) ===
As a teenager, Kempowski, who was unathletic and had acquired a taste for American jazz and swing music through his older brother, chafed under compulsory service in the Hitler Youth, and was transferred into a penalty unit (Strafeinheit) of the organization. In early 1945 he was drafted into the Flakhelfer, the youth auxiliary of the Luftwaffe, serving in a special unit that performed courier functions. Kempowski's father, who had volunteered for military service at the beginning of the war, only to be turned away because of his membership in the Freemasons, was accepted for service in summer 1940, and died in combat on 26 April 1945.

=== Postwar ===
In the immediate postwar period, Kempowski worked for the U.S. Army in Wiesbaden, in the American zone of Allied-occupied Germany. In March 1948, during a visit to his home city of Rostock, in the Soviet zone, in what would later become communist East Germany, he was arrested by Soviet authorities and accused of spying for the U.S. Convicted by a Soviet military tribunal and sentenced to 25 years, he served eight years in a prison in Bautzen, and was released in 1956.

In West Germany he became a teacher in Breddorf (as of 1960), in Nartum (as of 1965) and in Zeven (between 1975 and 1979).

Kempowski died of intestinal cancer, aged 78, in Rotenburg on 5 October 2007.

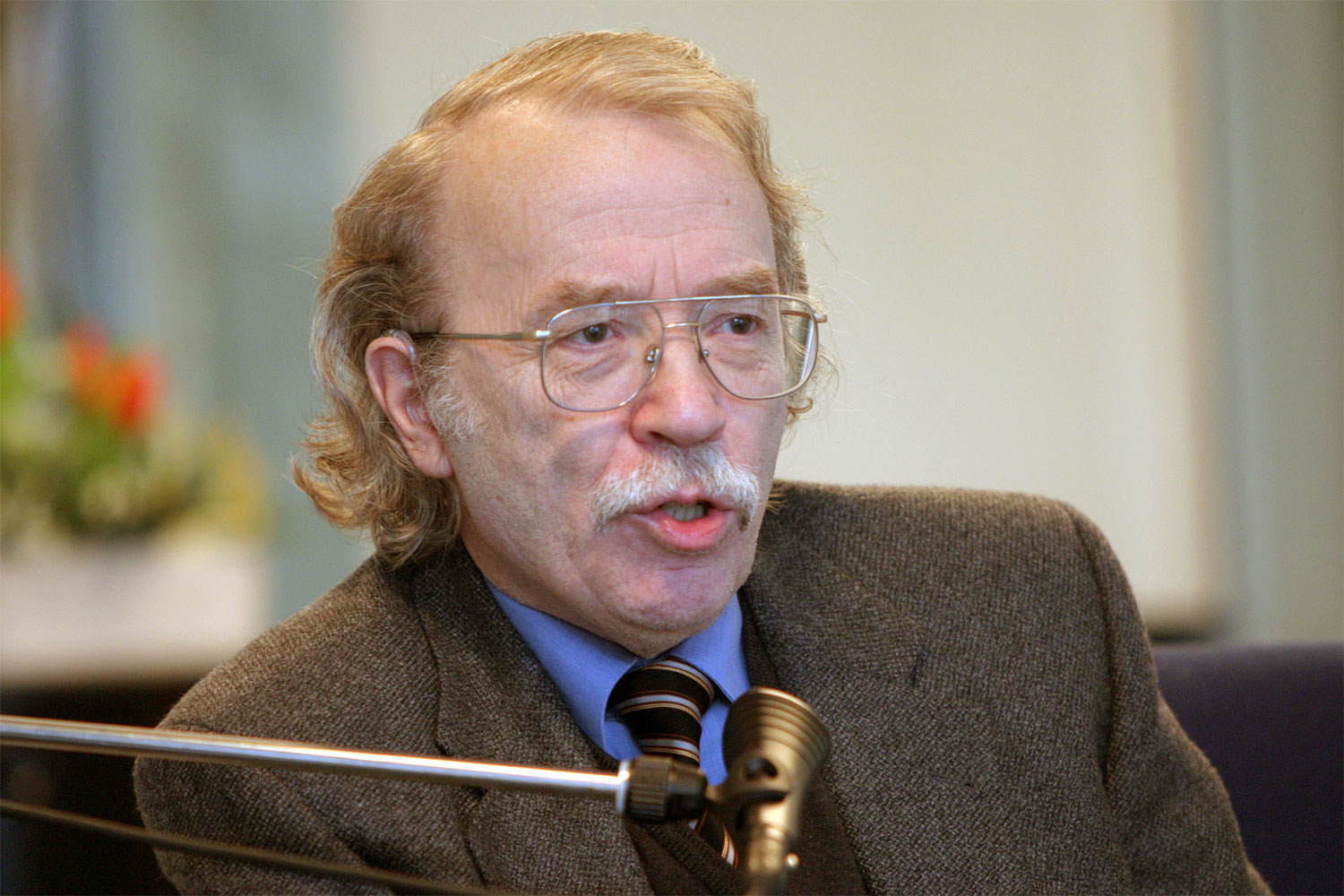
Walter Kempowski

== Works ==
Kempowski's first success as an author was the autobiographic novel Tadellöser & Wolff, in which he described his youth in Nazi Germany from the viewpoint of a well-off middle-class family. In several more books he completed the story of his family from the early 20th century into the late 1950s.

Between 1993 and 2005, he published his enormous chronicle Das Echolot, a collection and collage of documents by people of many kinds living in the circumstances of war. The ten-volume work consists of thousands of personal documents, letters, newspaper reports, and autobiographical accounts that he began collecting in the 1980s and which he referred to as a "small library of the nameless". The documents are now deposited in the archive of the Academy of Arts, Berlin. The last volume of Das Echolot was translated into English by Shaun Whiteside under the title Swansong 1945: A Collective Diary from Hitler's Birthday to VE Day (Granta, 2014).

Shortly before Kempowski's death, journalist Peer Teuwsen asked the author why he collected nearly 3.5 million pieces of paper on the Holocaust. Kempowski replied:

"I've got this thing for specific details. It never means anything to me when people say that three or four million people were gassed. But when I hear that an SS man in Dachau tortured poor Pastor Schneider, things that are long forgotten but that have been documented – I can get a picture of the monstrous horrors. The very idea of wiping out an entire people, pure madness. And all that time I was sitting in the parlour on a rug, playing with little cars."

== List of works ==
- Im Block. Ein Haftbericht. Reinbek bei Hamburg: Rowohlt, 1969.
- Tadellöser & Wolff. Ein bürgerlicher Roman. Munich: Hanser, 1971. (=An Ordinary Youth, translated by Michael Lipkin, London: Granta Books, 2023. ISBN 978-1783788842.)
- Uns gehts ja noch gold. Roman einer Familie. Munich: Hanser, 1972.
- Haben Sie Hitler gesehen? Deutsche Antworten. Munich: Hanser, 1973 (=Did you ever see Hitler?: German answers, translated by Michael Roloff, with a preface by Helen Wolff, postscript by Sebastian Haffner, New York: Avon Books, 1975. ISBN 0-380-00519-0).
- Der Hahn im Nacken. Mini-Geschichten. Reinbek bei Hamburg: Rowohlt, 1973.
- Immer so durchgemogelt. Erinnerungen an unsere Schulzeit. Munich: Hanser, 1974.
- Ein Kapitel für sich. Munich: Hanser, 1975.
- Alle unter einem Hut. Über 170 witzige und amüsante Alltagsminiminigeschichten. Bayreuth: Loewe, 1976.
- Wer will unter die Soldaten?, Munich: Hanser, 1976.
- Aus großer Zeit. Hamburg: Knaus, 1978 (=Days of greatness, translated by Leila Vennewitz, London: Secker & Warburg, 1982 ISBN 0-436-23290-1).
- Haben Sie davon gewußt? Deutsche Antworten. Hamburg: Knaus, 1979.
- Unser Böckelmann. Hamburg: Knaus, 1979
- Kempowskis einfache Fibel. Brunswick: Westermann, 1980.
- Schöne Aussicht. Hamburg: Knaus. 1981.
- Beethovens Fünfte. Moin Vaddr läbt. Radio plays. Hamburg: Knaus, 1982.
- Herrn Böckelmanns schönste Tafelgeschichten nach dem ABC geordnet. Hamburg: Knaus, 1983.
- Herzlich willkommen. Munich: Knaus, 1984.
- Haumiblau. 208 Pfenniggeschichten für Kinder. Munich: Bertelsmann, 1986.
- Hundstage. Munich: Knaus, 1988 (=Dog days, Norma S. Davis, Garold N. Davis, and Alan F. Keele (trls.), Columbia, SC: Camden House, c1991. ISBN 0-938100-78-5.)
- Sirius. Eine Art Tagebuch. Munich: Knaus, 1990
- Mark und Bein. Eine Episode (translated into English as Marrow and Bone, see below). Munich: Knaus, 1991.
- Das Echolot. Ein kollektives Tagebuch Januar und Februar 1943. 4 vols. Munich: Knaus, 1993.
- Der arme König von Opplawur. Ein Märchen. Munich: Knaus, 1994.
- Der Krieg geht zu Ende. Chronik für Stimmen – Januar bis Mai 1945. Radio play. Stuttgart 1995.
- Weltschmerz. Kinderszenen fast zu ernst. Munich: Knaus, 1995.
- Bloomsday '97. Munich: Knaus, 1997.
- Heile Welt. Munich: Knaus, 1998.
- Die deutsche Chronik. 9 vols. Munich: Knaus, 1999.
- Das Echolot. Fuga furiosa. Ein kollektives Tagebuch Winter 1945. 4 vols. Munich: Knaus, 1999.
- Walter Kempowski liest »Tadellöser & Wolff«. Audio book. Georgsmarienhütte: CPO, 2001.
- Alkor. Tagebuch 1989. Munich: Knaus, 2001.
- Der rote Hahn. Dresden 1945. Munich: Knaus, 2001.
- Das Echolot. Barbarossa '41. Ein kollektives Tagebuch. Munich: Knaus, 2002.
- Walter Kempowski liest »Aus großer Zeit«. Audio book. Georgsmarienhütte: CPO, 2003.
- Letzte Grüße. Munich: Knaus, 2003.
- Das 1. Album. 1981–1986. Frankfurt a.M. 2004.
- Walter Kempowski liest »Schöne Aussicht«. Audio book. Georgsmarienhütte: CPO, 2004.
- Das Echolot. Abgesang 45. Ein kollektives Tagebuch (=Swansong, see below). Munich: Knaus, 2005
- Culpa. Notizen zum Echolot. Munich: Knaus, 2005.
- Hamit. Tagebuch 1990. Munich: Knaus, 2006.
- Alles umsonst (=All for Nothing, see below). Munich: Knaus, 2006.
- Walter Kempowski/Uwe Johnson: Der Briefwechsel. Berlin: Transit, 2006. ISBN 978-3-88747-214-6.
- Swansong 1945: A Collective Diary of the Last Days of the Third Reich [Das Echolot. Abgesang 45. Ein kollektives Tagebuch]. Translated by Shaun Whiteside. New York: W.W. Norton, 2015. ISBN 978-0-393-24815-9.
- All for Nothing [Alles umsonst]. Translated by Anthea Bell. London: Granta Books, 2015. ISBN 978-1-84708-720-1.
- Marrow and Bone [Mark und Bein]. Translated by Charlotte Collins, originally translated under the title Homeland. London: Granta Books, 2018. ISBN 978-1-78378-352-6.

== Filmography ==
- Tadellöser & Wolff, directed by Eberhard Fechner (1975, TV film, based on the novel Tadellöser & Wolff)
- Ein Kapitel für sich, directed by Eberhard Fechner (1979, TV miniseries, based on the novel Ein Kapitel für sich)
- Herzlich willkommen, directed by Hark Bohm (1990, based on the novel Herzlich willkommen)
