= Marriages Forbidden =

1957 film

- Siegfried Breuer and Helga Franck
- Directed by: Heinz Paul
- Written by: Ernst Wolfgang Freissler (novel Der Glockenkrieg); Alois Johannes Lippl
- Produced by: Heinz Paul
- Starring: Ingeborg Cornelius; Helga Franck; Siegfried Breuer
- Cinematography: Franz Weihmayr
- Edited by: Karl Aulitzky
- Music by: Winfried Zillig
- Production company: Heinz Paul Filmproduktion
- Distributed by: Deutsche Film Hansa
- Release date: 13 June 1957
- Running time: 92 minutes
- Country: West Germany
- Language: German

Marriages Forbidden (German: Heiraten verboten) is a 1957 West German comedy film directed by Heinz Paul and starring Ingeborg Cornelius, Helga Franck and Siegfried Breuer. It was one of many heimatfilm pictures made during the decade.

The film's sets were designed by the art directors Hans Ledersteger and Ernst Richter.

== Cast ==
- Ingeborg Cornelius as Lisl Hackler
- Helga Franck as Fanni Wispaur
- Elisa Loti as Moni Roßkopf
- Herta Konrad as Resl Putz
- Siegfried Breuer Jr. as Ferdl Hitzinger
- Rudolf Rhomberg as Schorsch Mittnacht
- Walter Sedlmayr as Lois Haflinger
- Kurt Roy as Hias Vaitshofer
- Hans Leibelt as Pfarrer Franz Bruckner
- Rudolf Bernhard as Dekan Xaver Hindringer
- Willy Rösner as Bürgermeister Simon Roßkopf
- Liesl Karlstadt as Notburga Speckner
- Werner Finck as Amtsrichter Dr. Kern
- Heini Göbel as Amtsdiener Lorenz Heimerl
- Viktor Afritsch as Amtsbote Bartl Most
- Hans Hunkele as Bürgermeister Sebastian Hitzinger
- Paul Kürzinger as Nepomuk Haflinger
- Hans Stadtmüller as Matthias Vaitshofer
- Gretl Theimer as Walburga Hitzinger
- Nora Minor as Thea Roßkopf
- Georg Adelgeis as Josef Putz
- Carl Baierl as Mesner Pollinger
- Paul Bös as Blasius Hackler
- Heinrich Hauser as Mesner Nagler
- Hilde Hetzel as Kordula Dürr
- Ludwig Schmid-Wildy as Jakob Mittnacht
- Fritz Straßner as Raimund Wispaur

== Bibliography ==
- Willi Höfig. Der deutsche Heimatfilm 1947–1960. 1973.
