= Twenty Girls and the Teachers =

- A scene featuring Mascha Gonska
- Directed by: Werner Jacobs
- Written by: Barbara Anders; Michael Haller
- Produced by: Heinz Willeg
- Starring: Mascha Gonska; Heidi Kabel; Rudolf Schündler
- Cinematography: Ernst Wild
- Edited by: Gisela Haller
- Music by: Erwin Halletz
- Production companies: Allianz Filmproduktion; Terra-Filmkunst
- Distributed by: Constantin Film
- Release date: 25 February 1971
- Running time: 99 minutes
- Country: West Germany
- Language: German

Twenty Girls and the Teachers (German: Zwanzig Mädchen und die Pauker: Heute steht die Penne kopf) is a 1971 West German comedy film directed by Werner Jacobs and starring Mascha Gonska, Heidi Kabel, Rudolf Schündler and Fritz Tillmann.

== Cast ==
- Mascha Gonska as Trixie
- Heidi Kabel as Tante Adele
- Rudolf Schündler as Onkel Theobald
- Fritz Tillmann as Studienrat Dr. Birnbaum
- Eva Maria Meineke as Fräulein Brösel
- Ralf Wolter as Studienrat Nager
- Jutta Speidel as Ina
- Gerhart Lippert as Dr. Klaus Höllriegel
- Marion Marlon as Rosi
- Balduin Baas as Dr. Hasenbruch
- Rolf Olsen as Theaterdirektor Klobaster
- Janina Richter as Betty
- Ulrich Beiger as Kultusminister
- Franz Muxeneder as Hausmeister
- Brigitte Mira as Wirtin
- Werner Stock
- Manuela as Manuela
- Albert Bessler as Studienrat Dr. Ernst Höllriegel

== Bibliography ==
- Jan Hinnerk Mahler & Carsten Wittmaack. Heidi Kabel: sag ja zum Leben. Militzke, 2004.
