= What Is the Matter with Willi? =

1970 film

- Directed by: Werner Jacobs
- Written by: Wilhelm Lichtenberg (play); Eckart Hachfeld
- Produced by: Horst Wendlandt
- Starring: Heinz Erhardt; Ralf Wolter; Ruth Stephan
- Cinematography: Karl Löb
- Edited by: Walter von Bonhorst
- Music by: Heinz Alisch
- Production company: Rialto Film
- Distributed by: Constantin Film
- Release date: 17 July 1970
- Running time: 85 minutes
- Country: West Germany
- Language: German

What Is the Matter with Willi? (German: Was ist denn bloß mit Willi los) is a 1970 West German comedy film directed by Werner Jacobs and starring Heinz Erhardt, Ralf Wolter and Ruth Stephan. It was based on a character Heinz Erhardt played on television. It was followed by a loose sequel That Can't Shake Our Willi! and in 1971 a third film Our Willi Is the Best was made with Erhard returning as Willi. The final film Willi Manages The Whole Thing was released in 1972.

== Synopsis ==
A tax inspector tries to reform the Ministry of Finance.

== Cast ==
- Heinz Erhardt as Willi Winzig / Otto Winzig
- Ralf Wolter as Felix Klein
- Ruth Stephan as Annie Engel
- Helen Vita as Frau Stirnimaa
- Willy Reichert as Staatssekretär Kuhländer
- Rex Gildo as Frankie Kuhländer
- Stella Mooney as Helga
- Paul Esser as Motzmann
- Friedrich Schoenfelder as Dr. Senn
- Wolfgang Lukschy as Dr. Finz
- Ingrid van Bergen as Dr. Sigrid Kubin
- Rudolf Schündler as Fridolin
- Inge Wolffberg as Fräulein Grauvogel
