= Rolf Alexander Wilhelm =

German composer and conductor

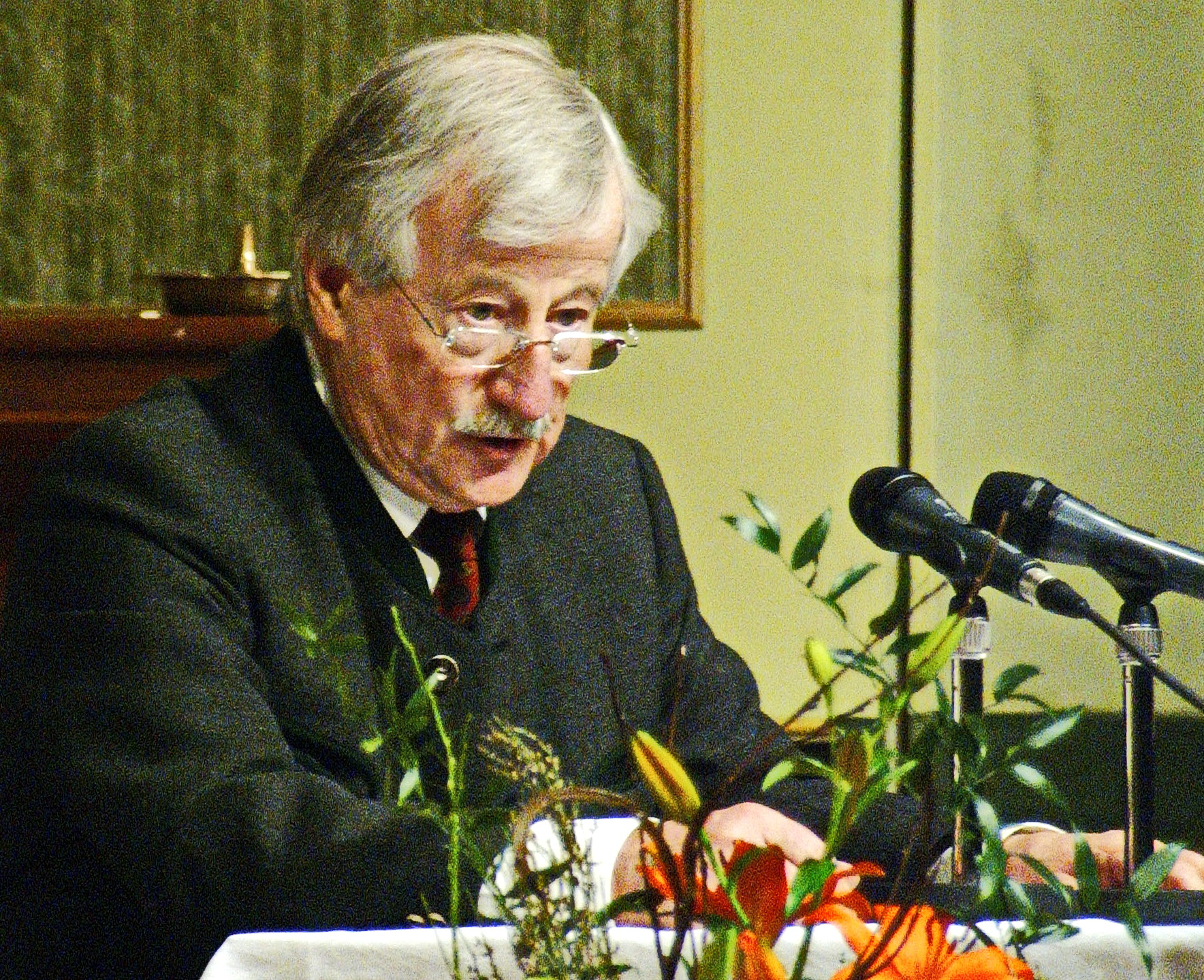

Rolf Alexander Wilhelm (23 June 1927 – 17 January 2013) was a German composer, film composer, arranger and conductor.

== Life ==
Born in Munich, at the age of seven Wilhelm received piano lessons. Afterwards he attended the grammar school in Berlin and Vienna. From 1942 he studied piano with a special permission with Grete Hinterhofer and musical composition with Joseph Marx at the Wiener Musikhochschule.

His war deployment as Luftwaffenhelfer and the subsequent imprisonment interrupted the musical career of Wilhelm, who returned to destroyed Munich in 1945 with a Notabitur. There he was able to continue his studies at the Hochschule für Musik und Theater München from 1946 and passed the school-leaving examination in 1948. Among his teachers were Heinrich Knappe (conducting), Joseph Haas (musical composition) and Hans Rosbaud (master class)

Even before that, in 1946, Radio München, the forerunner of the Bayerischer Rundfunk, produced The Canterville Ghost, one of its first radio plays after the Second World War. Through the mediation of his brother Kurt Wilhelm who acted as assistant director for the play, the nineteen-year-old composer received his first commission. The work was convincing and Wilhelm advanced to become a busy freelancer for the radio station. He also composed music for the still young medium television for various Zeichengeschichten by Reiner Zimnik, for example for Jonas der Angler (1954) and Der Kran (1956).

Wilhelm wrote his first major film music in 1954 for the first film of the 08/15 trilogy, which is one of the most successful post-war films in Germany. Up to the 1990s, the music for about 60 feature films followed, including classics such as The Forests Sing Forever (1959), It Can't Always Be Caviar (1961), Black-White-Red Four Poster (1962), Scotland Yard Hunts Dr. Mabuse (1963), Tales of a Young Scamp (1964), six films of the Lümmel series (1967 to 1972), The Flying Classroom (1973), The Serpent's Egg (1977), Ödipussi (1988) and finally Pappa Ante Portas (1991).

Among his most complex film works is the music for the large-scale German production Die Nibelungen (1966/67). The rhythm and sound schemata of Mars from the cycle of symphonic poems The Planets by Gustav Holst are now part of the standard stylistic repertoire of the film composers in Hollywood.

Wilhelm has also composed the music for more than 250 radio plays, over 350 television productions and about 300 commercials. In addition, numerous stage musics, orchestra suites and literary chansons were created. For example, he set texts by Kurt Tucholsky to music.

In addition he composed as a young man pop songs under the pseudonym Alex Rolf Ander. His most famous work under this name was Der kleine Eisbär, published in 1951. The use of this pseudonym did not reach the public during his lifetime and was only made public after his death by his daughter Catharina Wilhelm.

He was married to the actress Helga Neuner, who became known to a wide audience through numerous theater appearances and the television series Die Firma Hesselbach.

Wilhelm died at the age of 85 years on 17 January 2013 with his family. The artistic estate is kept in the German Composers' Archive in the Europäisches Zentrum der Künste Hellerau.

== Filmography ==
=== Feature films ===
- 1954: 08/15
- 1954: The Phantom of the Big Tent
- 1955: 08/15 – Part 2
- 1955: 08/15 at Home
- 1956: Weil du arm bist, mußt du früher sterben
- 1956: Where the Ancient Forests Rustle
- 1957: Streifzug durch eine Stadt
- 1958: The Green Devils of Monte Cassino
- 1959: The Scarlet Baroness
- 1959: The Forests Sing Forever
- 1959: Heimat – Deine Lieder
- 1960: Don Carlos
- 1960: Der Schleier fiel
- 1960: Do Not Send Your Wife to Italy
- 1960: Die zornigen jungen Männer
- 1960: The Inheritance of Bjorndal
- 1961: Via Mala
- 1961: The Cry of the Wild Geese
- 1961: It Can't Always Be Caviar
- 1961: This Time It Must Be Caviar
- 1962: Adorable Julia
- 1962: Black-White-Red Four Poster
- 1962: Barras heute
- 1963: Scotland Yard Hunts Dr. Mabuse
- 1963: Ferien vom Ich
- 1963: Venusberg
- 1964: The River Line
- 1964: Tonio Kröger
- 1964: Tales of a Young Scamp
- 1964: The Blood of the Walsungs
- 1965: The Swedish Girl
- 1965: When the Grapevines Bloom on the Danube
- 1965: Aunt Frieda
- 1966: Once a Greek
- 1966: Onkel Filser – Allerneueste Lausbubengeschichten
- 1966: Die Nibelungen 1. Teil: Siegfried
- 1967: Die Nibelungen 2. Teil: Kriemhilds Rache
- 1967: Der Paukenspieler
- 1967: When Ludwig Goes on Manoeuvres
- 1967: The Heathens of Kummerow
- 1968: Zur Hölle mit den Paukern
- 1969: Pepe, der Paukerschreck
- 1969: Ludwig auf Freiersfüßen
- 1969: Hurra, die Schule brennt!
- 1970: We'll Take Care of the Teachers
- 1970: Das Glöcklein unterm Himmelbett
- 1971: Der scharfe Heinrich
- 1971: Morgen fällt die Schule aus
- 1972: Betragen ungenügend!
- 1973: The Flying Classroom
- 1974: When Mother Went on Strike
- 1977: Disorder and Early Torment
- 1977: Abelard
- 1977: The Serpent's Egg
- 1977: Die Jugendstreiche des Knaben Karl
- 1979: The Wonderful Years
- 1980: From the Life of the Marionettes
- 1982: Doctor Faustus
- 1988: Ödipussi
- 1989: Sukkubus
- 1990: Rosamunde
- 1991: Pappa Ante Portas

=== Television ===
- 1954: Jonas der Angler
- 1956: Der Kran
- 1961: Zu viele Köche
- 1965: Radetzkymarsch
- 1967/68: Sherlock Holmes
- 1969–1970: Die Perle – Aus dem Tagebuch einer Hausgehilfin
- 1970: Mein Freund Harvey
- 1974: Telerop 2009 – Es ist noch was zu retten
- 1975: Tatort: Als gestohlen gemeldet
- 1978: Sachrang (TV miniseries)
- 1986: Tatort: Riedmüller, Vorname Sigi
- 1987: Tatort: Pension Tosca oder Die Sterne lügen nicht
- 1992: Die Ringe des Saturn
- also episodes to the series Die fünfte Kolonne, Der Kommissar and Derrick

== Awards ==
- Verdienstorden der Bundesrepublik Deutschland (1993)
- Bayerischer Poetentaler of the Münchner Turmschreiber
- ITEA Lifetime Achievement Award (2012)

== Discography ==
- Deutsche Filmkomponisten, Folge 4, Rolf Wilhelm, Bear Family Records, 2001, BCD 16484 AR
- Rolf Wilhelm 1: Tarabas / Hiob (director: Michael Kehlmann), 2006 Alhambra (A 8957)
- Rolf Wilhelm 2: Flucht ohne Ende / Radetzkymarsch (series: Michael Kehlmann), 2006 Alhambra (A8958)
- Die Nibelungen, 2001 Cobra (CR 006A/B)
- Loriot: Pappa ante Portas (soundtrack)
- Loriot: Ödipussi (soundtrack)
- Hugo Hartung – Ich denke oft an Piroschka. Direction Kurt Wilhelm ISBN 3-550-09092-7
- Lausbubengeschichten von Ludwig Thoma. Narrated by Willy Rösner (spoken record)
- Kurt Wilhelm – Der Brandner Kaspar und das ewig' Leben. Komödie nach einer Erzählung, Motiven und Gedichten von Franz von Kobell. Music: Rolf Wilhelm (spoken record)
- Jonas der Angler/Lektro: Die verschwundene Melodie. Joachim Fuchsberger liest moderne Märchen von Reiner Zimnik. (spoken record)
- Gisela May singt Tucholsky
- Der Sängerkrieg der Heidehasen. Ein Hörspiel für Groß und Klein von James Krüss.
