= Oh My Darling Daughter =

1970 novel by Eric Malpass

- 2001 reprint cover
- Author: Eric Malpass
- Publisher: Corgi Books
- Publication date: 1970
- ISBN: 978-0-552-10756-3

Oh My Darling Daughter is a humorous coming-of-age novel by Eric Malpass first published in 1970. Set in the fictitious Derbyshire village of Shepherd's Delight during Harold Wilson's first term as Prime Minister (1964–1970), Oh My Darling Daughter is about the Kembles, a well-to-do, conservative and church-going family of five, and in particular about Viola, the eponymous daughter of the house who, at 17, suddenly finds herself in a position of having to care for the rest of the family when her mother Clementine walks out on them after a row with her husband.

== Plot summary ==
This unforeseen event occurs at the beginning of summer, when Viola has just finished school. St. Winifred's, her "Alma mater", is an expensive public school which prides itself on turning out "ladies"—refined young women who are mostly "unemployable" and have certainly not been taught domestic subjects but who will nevertheless, it is believed, have no problem finding suitable husbands among their own social class. Secretly, Viola has already made her choice in this respect: She intends "to marry the Reverend Mr Chisholm and have ten children". Now she is waiting for Chisholm to respond to her subtle, ladylike advances.

However, at the same time she is in charge of the household, tending to her father Harry, who writes articles on literature; her twelve-year-old sister Persephone ("Perse"), who also goes to St. Winifred's; and her five-year-old brother Nicholas Anthony ("Trubshaw"). Their large house, The Old Vicarage, has not been renovated in a long time, which has started to show in places and does not make life easier for them. (They have named the spare bedrooms after the problems that have befallen them: Dry rot, Woodworm, the Mildew Room.) While they are slowly adjusting to their new life without Mother, Clementine Kemble occasionally informs them about her current whereabouts—they get cheery postcards from such faraway places as Marrakesh, Cairo, Istanbul, Samarkand, Kuala Lumpur, Eureka, Los Angeles, and Acapulco.

When Harry Kemble thinks they cannot cope alone any longer he hires Gloria Perkins, a friend of his wife's, to keep house for them. However, Gloria turns out to be not only dim-witted but also spectacularly incompetent as a housekeeper—the only dish she can prepare is goulash—while at the same time she is a young unattached and very attractive woman. Gossip among the villagers that she might be Harry Kemble's "mistress" seems inevitable, especially when people find out about her loose morals. ("Gloria wouldn't recognize a moral principle if it was served up to her on a plate, with chestnut stuffing".)

Even the Reverend Chisholm seems to be attracted to Gloria and succeeds in involving her in various church activities. Just as Viola starts becoming slightly suspicious of the two Chisholm, to her great and pleasant surprise, proposes to her, adding that the responsible thing to do will be to wait for a year or two for them to get married. Nevertheless, in seventh heaven now, Viola discards any ideas of continuing her association with Johnnie Wrighton, a friendly young man who has obviously fallen in love with her but whom she considers definitely beneath her as he is the son of ordinary farmers.

On Christmas Eve, six months after having bolted from Shepherd's Delight, Clementine Kemble makes a surprise appearance at The Old Vicarage. Looking out of the window, the Kembles see a beautiful woman clad in mink alighting from a London taxi, her baggage in tow. Only gradually does Harry Kemble accept it when his wife informs him that she has made up her mind to stay for good now. Immediately she takes over the regime again, having been used all her life to getting her way in all decisions big and small, whether they concern her own person or another family member. She gets rid of Gloria Perkins by inviting her husband's literary agent for the weekend and having her run off with him back to London without even doing so much as saying good-bye; she subtly prepares for the family's move from Derbyshire to the island of Sark, where she has just inherited a beautiful house but where no one except herself wants to go and live; and she vehemently forbids Viola to marry Chisholm.

When Perse gets into trouble by sending poison pen letters to a number of villagers Clementine Kemble once more takes the initiative. To protect her girl from being found out she deliberately spreads the rumour that it was her husband who, allegedly in a temporary state of overwork and confusion, has written and dispatched them. Harry Kemble is furious when she tells him, but at the same time can do nothing about it except thinking about relocating to another part of the country—maybe Sark.

The tragic aspect of Perse's bizarre adolescent prank is the ensuing suicide attempt of Agnes Buttle, a middle-aged spinster accused by Viola, herself the recipient of an anonymous letter ("Leave him alone or I'll kill you"), of writing the letters. However, as it soon turns out, Agnes Buttle has had other reasons for being desperate, first and foremost the Reverend Chisholm's abominable behaviour. To further his career in the Church, he made advances to Buttle, whose uncle was a bishop, although she is more than ten years his senior. When that uncle died, he dropped her. Chisholm has also fallen in love with Gloria Perkins and only proposed to Viola to avert attention from his association with Gloria. Viola considers it an important step in her journey from "green girl" to full-fledged adult when she breaks off her engagement and calls Chisholm a "poor little bastard".

At the beginning of April, shortly before Viola's 18th birthday, the Kembles finally move to Sark. By now Viola has realised that she loves Johnnie Wrighton, but her mother already has other plans for her. Viola is to get a job in Berkshire as a receptionist for a distant uncle of hers who is a GP there. That way, Clementine Kemble assures her, she will meet many eligible young men to choose from. Only by means of a "ruse"—she tells her little sister that she got pregnant from a day tripper to the island—can she eventually convince her mother, who for an awful moment loses her poise and fears that it actually might be true, that they are now on the same footing. At the end of the novel Johnnie Wrighton proposes to Viola, and Clementine Kemble not only gives her consent but also surprises them by giving them The Old Vicarage as a wedding present.

== Quotes ==
- Viola discussing her planned marriage to Chisholm with the Vicar:

"How do your parents feel about this?"
"They don't know, yet. But they won't mind."
He said earnestly, "I wouldn't be too sure of that. You're awfully young, you know."
"I'm seventeen. Juliet was only thirteen."
"My dear child, look what happened to her."

- Viola kissing Johnnie Wrighton for the first time:

"I moved closer, and pressed my lips tenderly against his; at last we began to stroll back to the car, our arms round each other's waists, my head on his shoulder, his lips in my hair. The moon went with us, jigging over the treetops, leering a bit now, I thought. I wished I knew what was supposed to happen when we got back to the car. St Winifred's had been as reticent about this as about Economics."

- Viola discussing her future job in Berkshire with her parents:

"Now, Viola dear, no more arguments. You'll thank me for this when you've got three beautiful children and a husband you adore. Won't she, Harry?"
"Always provided she doesn't have them in that order," chuckled Father.
There are times, I must admit, when I actively dislike Father. He'll sell his own daughter down the river, just so that he can make a silly, and rather coarse, joke.

== Film, TV or theatrical adaptations ==
Oh My Darling Daughter was filmed in West Germany in 1974 as Als Mutter streikte (When Mother Went on Strike). The film was directed by Eberhard Schröder and starred Peter Hall (as "Dr. Harry Kemper"), Johanna Matz (Clementine), Belinda Mayne (Viola), Gila von Weitershausen (Gloria), and Elisabeth Flickenschildt (Aunt Clarissa).

== See also ==
- Bildungsroman
- The Daily Telegraph – read by the Kembles, who are Conservative, and mentioned several times throughout the novel

== Read on ==
- Josephine Humphreys's novel Rich in Love (1987), set among the well-to-do inhabitants of Charleston, South Carolina and surroundings, shows quite a number of striking parallels to Oh My Darling Daughter. It is also about a mother who leaves her family because she believes she cannot cope any more. Like in Malpass's novel, the first person narrator is a 17-year-old girl who realises that it is now up to her to replace her mother and manage the affairs of the whole family.
