= Ruth Stephan =

German actress

- Born: 27 October 1926; Altona, Germany
- Died: 8 August 1975 (aged 48); West Berlin, West Germany
- Occupation: Actress
- Years active: 1951–1974
- Spouse: Balduin Baas

Ruth Stephan (27 October 1926 – 8 August 1975) was a German film and stage actress. She appeared with Heinz Erhardt in the 'Willi' series of films.

== Biography ==
Ruth Stephan was born to retail merchant Kurt Stephan and his wife, Kriemhilde. After graduating from school, she first worked as a certified bank teller before taking acting lessons.

During her early acting career, she worked mostly on the stage in Germany, including theaters in Hamburg and Berlin. She appeared in her first movie in 1951, and subsequently became a popular figure in German comedy movies.

Most notably she appeared in numerous movies alongside Heinz Erhardt, often playing his wife or secretary. She also became popular for portraying an English and biology teacher in the late 1960s high school movie series Die Lümmel von der ersten Bank (English translation: The buggers from the first bench).

In the early 1970s Stephan went back to the stage. She died of lung cancer in August 1975. A street in the district of Berlin-Spandau is named after her.

== Selected filmography ==
- Die Frauen des Herrn S. (1951) - Das Persönchen
- Homesick for You (1952)
- I Lost My Heart in Heidelberg (1952) - Dietlinde, Studentin
- You Only Live Once (1952) - Frl. Rosa
- The Uncle from America (1953) - Rosa, Dienstmädchen
- Not Afraid of Big Animals (1953) - Partnerin des Zauberkünstlers
- Lady's Choice (1953)
- The Empress of China (1953)
- Hit Parade (1953)
- The Private Secretary (1953) - Lissy
- The Abduction of the Sabine Women (1954) - Dienstmädchen Rosa
- The Telephone Operator (1954) - Lenchen Miesbach
- Clivia (1954)
- Don't Worry About Your Mother-in-Law (1954)
- Ten on Every Finger (1954) - Hans Albers' Sketchpartnerin
- An jedem Finger zehn (1954) - Singer
- The Spanish Fly (1955) - Jutta
- I Know What I'm Living For (1955) - Anna, Wirtschafterin bei Maria
- How Do I Become a Film Star? (1955)
- A Heart Full of Music (1955) - Fleurette
- Three Days Confined to Barracks (1955) - Auguste, die Köchin
- Love, Dance and a Thousand Songs (1955) - Wicky Winkler
- Music in the Blood (1955) - Irma Pehlke
- Charley's Aunt (1956) - Mona
- Die wilde Auguste (1956) - Auguste Schrull
- The Stolen Trousers (1956) - Grete Giesemann
- Ein tolles Hotel (1956) - Luise, seine Frau
- Das Liebesleben des schönen Franz (1956) - Emmi, Nichte des Portiers
- Du bist Musik (1956) - Sophie Klemke
- Musikparade (1956) - Trudchen
- Manöverball (1956) - Emma
- Saison in Oberbayern (1956) - Wanda Buzigl
- Die liebe Familie (1957) - Fräulein Briesnitz
- August der Halbstarke (1957) - Gitta Tamara, Chansonette
- Die Unschuld vom Lande (1957) - Else Meise
- Two Bavarians in the Jungle (1957) - Lilo Knopke
- Das Glück liegt auf der Straße (1957) - Studentin
- The Simple Girl (1957) - Milli
- The Daring Swimmer (1957) - Karin Biedermann
- The Legs of Dolores (1957) - Auguste Link, Chefin des "Pigalle"
- Greetings and Kisses from Tegernsee (1957) - Dorothea
- ...und abends in die Scala (1958) - Trudchen Putzke
- When She Starts, Look Out (1958) - Christa Knax
- The Star of Santa Clara (1958) - Mitzi
- A Song Goes Round the World (1958) - Malvine
- Here I Am, Here I Stay (1959) - Lucie
- Schlag auf Schlag (1959) - Gisela Sanders
- Peter Shoots Down the Bird (1959) - Mathilde Hütchen
- La Paloma (1959) - Fräulein Förster
- Of Course, the Motorists (1959) - Jutta Schmalbach
- Kauf dir einen bunten Luftballon (1961) - Mia
- Ach Egon! (1961) - Anna
- Pichler's Books Are Not in Order (1961) - Isabella
- You Must Be Blonde on Capri (1961) - Lotte Jeschke
- Ein Stern fällt vom Himmel (1961) - Helga Held 11
- Isola Bella (1961) - Fräulein Finkenbusch
- Ramona (1961) - Ellinor
- Max the Pickpocket (1962) - Desiree
- The Turkish Cucumbers (1962) - Ruthlinde, beider Tochter
- The Sold Grandfather (1962) - Frl. Schülke, Sekretärin
- The Bird Seller (1962) - Kammerzofe Melanie
- Wild Water (1962) - Johanna
- Our Crazy Nieces (1963) - Felicitas
- Breakfast in Bed (1963) - Cilly
- Hochzeit am Neusiedler See (1963) - Isolde Tristan, Wanderbühnentalent
- Our Crazy Aunts in the South Seas (1964) - Felicitas
- The World Revolves Around You (1964) - Henriette Andreesen, Lilians Tante
- Come to the Blue Adriatic (1966) - Frl. Habicht
- The Sinful Village (1966) - Barbara Veit
- Spukschloß im Salzkammergut (1966)
- Rheinsberg (1967) - Anna
- Zur Hölle mit den Paukern (1968, part 1) - Dr. Pollhagen
- Pepe, der Paukerschreck (1969, part 3) - Studienrätin Dr. Pollhagen
- Helgalein (1969) - Frau Creutz
- Klein Erna auf dem Jungfernstieg (1969) - Frau Nohr
- Hurra, die Schule brennt! (1969, part 4) - Studienrätin Dr. Pollhagen
- We'll Take Care of the Teachers (1970, part 5) - Studienrätin Dr. Pollhagen
- What Is the Matter with Willi? (1970) - Annie Engel
- That Can't Shake Our Willi! (1970) - Sieglinde Hirsekorn
- Hurray We Are Bachelors Again (1971) - Marie
- Our Willi Is the Best (1971) - Heidelinde Hansen
- Kompanie der Knallköppe (1971) - Freifrau Agnes von Bülau
- Kinderarzt Dr. Fröhlich (1972) - Josefa
