= Three Days Confined to Barracks =

Three Days Confined to Barracks may refer to:

- Three Days Confined to Barracks (1930 film), a German comedy film
- Three Days Confined to Barracks (1955 film), a West German comedy film, a remake of the 1930 film
