= Zum Teufel mit der Penne =

1968 film

- Directed by: Werner Jacobs
- Written by: Franz Seitz Jr.
- Produced by: Rialto Film, Terra Film
- Starring: Peter Alexander, Hansi Kraus and Hannelore Elsner
- Music by: Peter Thomas
- Release date: 1968
- Running time: 1h 39m
- Country: West Germany
- Language: German

Zum Teufel mit der Penne is a 1968 West German comedy film directed by Werner Jacobs and starring Peter Alexander, Hansi Kraus and Hannelore Elsner. Its English title is To Hell with School. It was the second in the 7-part Die Lümmel von der ersten Bank series of comedy films.

== Cast ==
- Peter Alexander as Dr. Roland
- Hansi Kraus as Pepe Notnagel
- Hannelore Elsner as Marion Notnagel
- Theo Lingen as Oberstudiendirektor (headmaster) Dr. Gottlieb Taft
- Willy Millowitsch as Kurt Notnagel
- Balduin Baas as Studienrat Blaumeier
- Rudolf Schündler as Studienrat Knörz
- Sabine Bethmann as Frau Tell
- Inge Wolffberg as Studienrätin Pollhagen
- Joachim Teege as Dr. Wilhelm Maria Tell
- Achim Strietzel as Pierre de Dent
- Edith Schollwer as Oberin (Mother Superior)
- Gerd Vespermann as Stohler
- Hans Terofal as Pedell (bedel) Bloch
- Heintje Simons as himself
- Heidrun Hankammer as Secretary to de Dent
- Johanna König as Fräulein Weidt
