= Hansi Kraus =

German actor

- Born: Jan Christoph Krause; 26 June 1952 (age 73); Gliwice, Silesia, Poland
- Occupations: Actor, photographer, author
- Years active: 1964–present
- Website: http://www.hansikraus.de/

Jan Christoph Krause, known by his stage name Hansi Kraus or Hans Kraus (born 26 June 1952), is a German actor.

== Career ==
Hans Krause was born in Gliwice, Silesia, Poland. He was 12 years old when he was discovered by German film producer Franz Seitz, Jr. The name Hans Krause sounded too Prussian to play a character created by Bavarian author Ludwig Thoma, so Seitz decided to use the screenname "Hansi Kraus". His first role was playing the Bavarian boy "Ludwig" in a film adaption of Ludwig Thoma's autobiographical stories. Due to his success, the film Tales of a Young Scamp was followed by four installments.

Besides these and other films, he also starred a series of seven feature films about a young prankster called "Pepe Nietnagel". Some 25 years later, he again assumed the role of the now grown-up Pepe Nietnagel in the TV series Ein Schloß am Wörthersee.

In his films as a child actor, he worked already regularly with performers including Uschi Glas, Peter Alexander, Rudi Carrell, and Theo Lingen. As an adult he worked in main as a stage and television actor.

He is the father of actress Miriam Krause.

== Filmography ==
Kraus' filmography includes:

- 1964: Tales of a Young Scamp
- 1965: Aunt Frieda
- 1966: Onkel Filser - Allerneueste Lausbubengeschichten
- 1967: Die Lümmel von der ersten Bank I. Zur Hölle mit den Paukern
- 1967: When Ludwig Goes on Manoeuvres
- 1968: Die Lümmel von der ersten Bank II. Zum Teufel mit der Penne
- 1969: Ludwig auf Freiersfüßen
- 1969: Die Lümmel von der ersten Bank III. Pepe, der Paukerschreck
- 1969: Die Lümmel von der ersten Bank IV. Hurra, die Schule brennt!
- 1970: Das Glöcklein unterm Himmelbett
- 1970: Musik, Musik – da wackelt die Penne
- 1970: Die Lümmel von der ersten Bank, V. Wir hau'n die Pauker in die Pfanne
- 1971: Außer Rand und Band am Wolfgangsee
- 1971: Kinderarzt Dr. Fröhlich
- 1971: Die Kompanie der Knallköppe
- 1971: Die Lümmel von der ersten Bank, VI. Morgen fällt die Schule aus
- 1972: Rudi, Behave!
- 1972: My Daughter, Your Daughter
- 1972: The Mad Aunts Strike Out
- 1972: Die Lümmel von der ersten Bank VII. Betragen ungenügend!
- 1973: Crazy - Completely Mad
- 1973: Das Wandern ist Herrn Müllers Lust
- 1973: Blue Blooms the Gentian
- 1975: The Secret Carrier
- 1977: Disorder and Early Torment
- 1977: Die Jugendstreiche des Knaben Karl
- 1979: Andreas Vöst (TV film)
- 1980: Der falsche Paß für Tibo (TV film)
- 1981: Manni, der Libero (TV series)
- 1983: Die Rumplhanni (TV film)
- 1985: Big Mäc
- 1985: Flammenzeichen (TV film)
- 1986: Waldhaus (TV series)
- 1987: Es geigt sich was (TV film)
- 1987–1991: Löwengrube (TV series)
- 1989: Der brave Sünder
- 1991: Success
- 1991/1992: Ein Schloß am Wörthersee (TV series, 3 episodes)
- 1992: Immer Ärger mit Nicole
- 1993: Seine Majestät der Kurgast (TV film)
- 1994: Der Komödienstadel – Die goldene Gans (TV film)
- 1994: Zum Stanglwirt (TV series)
- since 1994: Forsthaus Falkenau (TV series)
- 1995: Aus heiterem Himmel (TV series)
- 1997: Stürmischer Sommer (TV film)
- 2002: Der Urvogel (short film)
- 2003: Um Himmels Willen (TV series)
- 2003: Marienhof (TV series)
- 2005: München 7 (TV series)
- 2005: Mit Herz und Handschellen (TV series)
- 2006: Ritter der traurigen Gestalt (short film)
- 2007: Sturm der Liebe (TV series)
- 2010: Kollegium – Klassenkampf im Lehrerzimmer (TV series)
- 2019: Club der einsamen Herzen (TV film)
