= Zur Hölle mit den Paukern =

1968 film

- Directed by: Werner Jacobs
- Written by: Franz Seitz Jr.
- Starring: Hans Kraus, Theo Lingen and Günther Schramm
- Music by: Rolf Alexander Wilhelm
- Release date: 4 April 1968
- Running time: 1h 25m
- Country: West Germany
- Language: German

Zur Hölle mit den Paukern is a 1968 West German comedy film directed by Werner Jacobs and starring Hans Kraus, Theo Lingen and Günther Schramm. It was the first entry into the seven part Die Lümmel von der ersten Bank series of comedy films.

== Cast ==
- Hans Kraus: Pepe Nietnagel
- Theo Lingen: Oberstudiendirektor Dr. Gottlieb Taft
- Günther Schramm: Studienrat Dr. Albert Kersten
- Uschi Glas: Marion Nietnagel
- Gila von Weitershausen: Helena Taft
- Hannelore Elsner: Geneviève Ponelle
- Georg Thomalla: Kurt Nietnagel
- Rudolf Schündler: Oberstudienrat Prof. Dr. Arthur Knörz
- Hans Terofal: Pedell Georg Bloch
- Balduin Baas: Studienrat Dr. Blaumeier
- Oliver Hassencamp: Studienrat Priehl
- Monika Dahlberg: Fräulein Weidt, Sekretärin
- Ruth Stephan: Studienrätin Dr. Mathilde Pollhagen
- Wega Jahnke: Lydia Meier, Schülerin
- Ursula Grabley: Baronin, Freundin von Frau Nietnagel
- Ilse Petri: Frau Nietnagel
- Britt Lindberg: Susie Rixner
- Josef Coesfeld: Hotelportier
- Jürgen Drews: Schüler und Musiker
- Enrico Lombardi: Musiker
- Gerd Müller: Musiker
- Joachim Rake: Kultusminister
- Herbert Weißbach: Kommissionsleiter Brändle
