= Hurra, die Schule brennt! =

1969 German comedy film by Werner Jacobs

- German film poster
- Directed by: Werner Jacobs
- Screenplay by: Georg Laforet
- Produced by: Franz Seitz
- Starring: Hansi Kraus; Theo Lingen; Peter Alexander; Heintje Simons
- Cinematography: Hans Jura
- Edited by: Waltraut Lindenau
- Music by: Rolf Alexander Wilhelm
- Production company: Terra Filmkunst GmbH
- Distributed by: Constantin-Filmverleih
- Release date: 4 December 1969
- Running time: 98 minutes
- Country: Germany
- Language: German

Hurra, die Schule brennt! (German: "Hurrah, the School Is Burning!") is a 1969 German comedy film directed by Werner Jacobs and starring Peter Alexander, Heintje Simons and Theo Lingen. It is the fourth of a series of school comedy films under the collective title Die Lümmel von der ersten Bank ("The Brats from the Front Bench Row"), all of them starring Hansi Kraus and Theo Lingen.

== Plot ==
Dr. Peter Bach (Peter Alexander), a young and excellent teacher, has been mistakenly transferred to the village of Tuttelbach, where he teaches at the local elementary school. When the head of the Education Ministry, von Schnorr, attempts to correct that mistake, he finds Dr. Bach unwilling to leave since he has come to enjoy the easy and picturesque village life. However, in the end Bach is left with no other choice when von Schnorr accidentally drops his burning cigar into the school room's waste basket, where it quickly starts a fire that burns the school to the ground.

Dr. Bach and his nephew Jan (Heintje Simons) move to Baden-Baden, where Bach is assigned to the notorious Class 12a of the Mommsen-Gymnasium. Pepe Nietnagel (Hansi Kraus) and his classmates initially meet their new teacher with little enthusiasm, but Bach's easy-going and frank personality soon gains their genuine sympathy and support. Oberstudiendirektor Dr. Taft (Theo Lingen), being the old-fashioned traditionalist that he is, however, just as quickly disapproves of Bach's approach to the students, and together with the teaching staff's majority (not including young music teacher Julia Schumann, played by Gerlinde Locker) decides to get rid of him as quickly as possible. When Pepe and his friends learn about this, they begin to fight tooth and nail to keep Bach at their school, culminating in a school play in which Bach and the students present a very liberal re-interpretation of Schiller's William Tell. The film ends with Kurt Nietnagel, Pepe's father, asking Dr. Taft to attend the christening and maiden flight of a new glider at Nietnagel's glider club, which ends with Taft and Bach accidentally making the flight and a subsequent parachute dive back to the ground.

== Cast ==
- Hansi Kraus as Pepe Nietnagel
- Peter Alexander as Dr. Peter Bach
- Heintje Simons as Jan
- Theo Lingen as Oberstudiendirektor Dr. Taft
- Gerlinde Locker as Julia Schumann
- Werner Finck as von Schnorr
- Rudolf Schündler as Studienrat Dr. Knörz
- Ruth Stephan as Studienrätin Dr. Pollhagen
- Alexander Golling as Blaumeier
- Hans Terofal as Pedell Bloch
- Harald Juhnke as Referent
- Wolfgang Gruner as Kurt Nietnagel
- Carola Höhn as Frau Nietnagel

== Songs ==
- "Hurra, die Schule brennt" ("Hooray, the School Is Burning") ... Peter Alexander and children's choir
- "Wir zwei verstehn uns gut" ("The Two of Us Get Along Well") ... Peter Alexander and Heintje
- "Wie Böhmen noch bei Österreich war" ("When Bohemia was still part of Austria") ... Peter Alexander
- "Klein sein, das ist schön" ("Being Young is Nice") ... Heintje
- "Wilhelm Tell-Song" ... Peter Alexander and choir
- "Immer wieder" ("Again and Again") ... Peter Alexander and Heintje
- "Liebesträume" ("Love Dreams") ... Peter Alexander
- "Bonanza" ... Peter Alexander
- "Geh Deinen Weg" ("Follow Your Way") ... Heintje

== Awards ==
- 1970: Goldene Leinwand
