= Prosecutor Corda =

1953 film

- Directed by: Karl Ritter
- Written by: Christian Berthier; Karl Ritter
- Produced by: Robert Leistenschneider; Karl Schulz
- Starring: Ingeborg Engholm; Paul Klinger; Eva Probst
- Cinematography: Willy Winterstein
- Edited by: Hilde E. Grabow
- Music by: Fred Raymond
- Production company: Bühne und Film
- Distributed by: Panorama-Film
- Release date: 4 March 1953
- Running time: 100 minutes
- Country: West Germany
- Language: German

Prosecutor Corda (German: Staatsanwältin Corda) is a 1953 West German drama film directed by Karl Ritter and starring Ingeborg Engholm, Paul Klinger and Eva Probst. It was shot at the Wiesbaden Studios in Hesse and on location around the Rheingau. The film's sets were designed by the art directors Alfred Bütow and Ernst Schomer.

== Synopsis ==
A female state prosecutor is confronted with her past when her former lover is put on trial.

== Cast ==
- Ingeborg Egholm as Prosecutor Dr. Corda Frobenius
- Paul Klinger as Gastwirt Hans Neidhard
- Eva Probst as Steffi
- Alexander Golling as Gerichtspräsident
- Erika von Thellmann as Aenne Frobenius
- Paul Henckels as Bürgermeister
- Gisela von Collande as Klara Neidhard
- Herbert Hübner Senior Prosecutor
- Ilse Furstenberg as Grete
- Fritz Rémond as Prosecutor Kohlrausch
- Lutz Götz as Kriegsgefangenes

== Bibliography ==
- James Robert Parish. Film Actors Guide. Scarecrow Press, 1977.
