= The Simple Girl =

1957 film

- Directed by: Werner Jacobs
- Written by: Curth Flatow; Eckart Hachfeld
- Produced by: Artur Brauner
- Starring: Caterina Valente; Rudolf Prack; Ruth Stephan
- Cinematography: Friedl Behn-Grund
- Edited by: Jutta Hering
- Music by: Heinz Gietz
- Production company: CCC Film
- Distributed by: Gloria Film
- Release date: 23 August 1957
- Running time: 94 minutes
- Country: West Germany
- Language: German

The Simple Girl (German: Das einfache Mädchen) is a 1957 West German musical comedy film directed by Werner Jacobs and produced by Artur Brauner. It starred Caterina Valente, Rudolf Prack and Ruth Stephan.

== Production ==
The film was directed by German director Werner Jacobs and produced by Artur Brauner. It is based on an idea by Curth Flatow who also wrote the screenplay, together with Eckart Hachfeld. The working title was Bravo, Caterina. Horst Wendlandt was line producer and Brauner's wife, Maria, was in charge of costume design. Filming took place in May 1957 at the Spandau Studios in Berlin. The film's sets were designed by the art directors Emil Hasler and Paul Markwitz.

The film premiered on 23 August 1957 at the Thalia in Wiesbaden.

== Plot ==
Caterina Bastiani, a talented young actress, is offered the leading role in a musical. This is her big break but the author of the novel on which the musical is based is less than pleased about this adaptation — and he does not think much of Caterina. By accident Caterina meets a girl who has applied to work for the author as a maid. She takes the girl's place in order to prove her talent as an actress and shows up at the author's home as the new maid herself.

== Cast ==
- Caterina Valente as Caterina Bastiani
- Rudolf Prack as Thomas Krauss
- Ruth Stephan as Milli
- Rudolf Platte as Werner Pätzold
- Dorit Kreysler as Mrs. Seidel
- Helen Vita as Eva Krapke
- Peter W. Staub as Pit
- Stefan Haar as Jürgen Krauss
- Richard Allan as Robert Holden
- Hans Olden as Anton Schwarz
- Franz-Otto Krüger as Regisseur
- Henry Lorenzen as Komponist Heino Kies
- Herbert Weißbach as Baron Westhoff
- Edith Adana as Baronin Westhoff

== Bibliography ==
- Hans-Michael Bock and Tim Bergfelder. The Concise Cinegraph: An Encyclopedia of German Cinema. Berghahn Books, 2009.
