= Two Blue Eyes =

1955 film

- Directed by: Gustav Ucicky
- Written by: József Babay (novel); Kurt E. Walter
- Produced by: Walter Koppel; Heinz-Günter Sass; Gyula Trebitsch
- Starring: Marianne Koch; Claus Holm; Helen Vita
- Cinematography: Ekkehard Kyrath
- Edited by: Alice Ludwig
- Music by: Michael Jary
- Production company: Real Film
- Distributed by: Prisma-Filmverleih
- Release date: 4 November 1955
- Running time: 96 minutes
- Country: West Germany
- Language: German

Two Blue Eyes (German: Zwei blaue Augen) is a 1955 West German romance film directed by Gustav Ucicky and starring Marianne Koch, Claus Holm and Helen Vita.

It was made at the Wandsbek Studios of the Hamburg-based company Real Film. The film's sets were designed by the art directors Albrecht Becker and Herbert Kirchhoff.

== Cast ==
- Marianne Koch as Christiane Neubert
- Claus Holm as Dr. Michael Arndt
- Helen Vita as Vera Seidemann
- Camilla Spira as Frau Friedrich
- Kurt Meisel as Eddi Witt
- Charles Regnier as Hergentheimer, Direktor
- Richard Romanowsky as Carolus, Gärtner
- Ethel Reschke as Erika, Telefonistin
- Ernst von Klipstein as Feigl, Ingenieur
- Richard Münch as Schneider, Ingenieur
- Josef Dahmen as Professor Wittmann
- Albert Florath as Gastwirt
- Margarete Haagen as Oberschwester
- Friedrich Schütter as Werbeleiter "Hanno-Werke"
- Carl Voscherau as Polizist
- Otto Kuhlmann as 1. Bankbeamter
- Peter Frank as 2. Bankbeamter
- Willy Millowitsch as Pförtner
- Horst Beck as Werkmeister
- Gunnar Winkler as Singer

== Bibliography ==
- Hans-Michael Bock and Tim Bergfelder. The Concise Cinegraph: An Encyclopedia of German Cinema. Berghahn Books, 2009.
