= I Lost My Heart in Heidelberg (1952 film) =

1952 film

- Directed by: Ernst Neubach
- Written by: Gustav Kampendonk; Ernst Neubach
- Produced by: Werner Fischer; Fritz Kirchhoff
- Starring: Eva Probst; Adrian Hoven; Paul Hörbiger; Herbert Hübner
- Cinematography: Otto Baecker
- Edited by: Rosemarie Weinert
- Music by: Fred Raymond; Alfred Strasser
- Production company: Pontus Film
- Distributed by: Gloria Film
- Release date: 29 October 1952
- Running time: 99 minutes
- Country: West Germany
- Language: German

I Lost My Heart in Heidelberg (German: Ich hab' mein Herz in Heidelberg verloren) is a 1952 West German romantic musical film directed by Ernst Neubach and starring Eva Probst, Adrian Hoven and Paul Hörbiger. The film takes its title from the popular song I Lost My Heart in Heidelberg, whose lyrics Neubach had co-written in the 1920s. It was part of a strong trend towards heimatfilm productions set in romanticised Southern Germany, Austria or Switzerland. It premiered in Heidelberg on 29 October 1952.

Although they share the same title, the film is not a remake of I Lost My Heart in Heidelberg from 1926. It was made at the Spandau Studios in Berlin with location shooting at a variety of places included Cuxhaven, Wiesbaden and Heidelberg itself.

== Cast ==
- Eva Probst as Hella Romberg
- Adrian Hoven as Tony de Boers
- Paul Hörbiger as Josef Degener
- Dorit Kreysler as Pia Biberger
- Herbert Hübner as Präsident de Boers
- Ruth Stephan as Dietlinde, Studentin
- Christiane Maybach as Rita, Studentin
- Joachim Teege as Heinrich, Konditor
- Wolfgang Neuss as Karl, Student
- Reinhard Kolldehoff as Kapitän Reimann
- Adi Lödel as Otto, Konditorlehrling
- Ingrid Merz as Schwester Elvira
- Maria Syna as Sekretärin
- Maria Hofen as Pensionswirtin
- Nora Hagist
- Anni Marle
- Edith Meinel

== Bibliography ==
- Bergfelder, Tim (2005). International Adventures: German Popular Cinema and European Co-productions in the 1960s. Berghahn Books. ISBN 978-1-57181-539-2.
- Marshall, Bill; Stillwell, Robynn (2000). Musicals: Hollywood and Beyond. Intellect Books. ISBN 978-1-84150-003-4.
