= Joachim Teege =

German actor

Joachim Teege (November 30, 1925 – November 19, 1969) was a German character actor.

== Early life and career ==
Teege was born in Spremberg and educated in Berlin.

In 1963, Teege co-starred with Lola Müthel in well-received production of Carl Sternheim's little seen play, The Nebbich, at the Schauspiel Frankfurt. The following year, he starred in a revival of Arthur Watkyn's comedy thriller, Out of Bounds, staged by Otto Tausig at the Theater am Kurfuerstendam in Berlin, where it was deemed "currently the best boulevard piece around here" by Variety reviewer Hans Hoehn. Not quite four months later, that same critic dubbed Teege the city's "Best Actor [of] 1964" for this performance.

== Death ==
On November 19, 1969, Teege died in a Munich hospital. He was survived by his wife.

== Selected filmography ==
- The Adventures of Fridolin (1948) - Heini Bock
- Und wieder 48 (1948) - Reisender
- The Staircase (1950) - Herbert Ehrke
- The Merry Wives of Windsor (1950) - Mr. Spärlich
- Kommen Sie am Ersten (1951) - Charlie Stein
- The Dubarry (1951) - Alphonse Meyer, Fotograf
- Big City Secret (1952) - Fritz Möller
- I Lost My Heart in Heidelberg (1952) - Heinrich, Konditor
- Knall and Fall as Detectives (1953) - Dr. Klarwein
- Hocuspocus (1953) - Zeuge Eunano
- The Flower of Hawaii (1953) - Otto-Heinz
- Hochzeit auf Reisen (1953) - Junger Anwalt
- The Little Town Will Go to Sleep (1954)
- I Know What I'm Living For (1955)
- Three Days Confined to Barracks (1955) - Standesamtdiener Storch
- Der Frontgockel (1955) - Schindlbeck
- If We All Were Angels (1956) - Amtsanwalt
- The Miracle of Father Malachia (1961) - Cinema Owner
- Hocuspocus (1966) - Zeuge Munio Eunano
- The Hunchback of Soho (1966) - Lawyer Harold Stone
- Liselotte of the Palatinate (1966) - Abbé
- How to Seduce a Playboy (1966) - Emile
- Das Rasthaus der grausamen Puppen (1967)
- Rocket to the Moon (1967) - Bulgeroff
- Glorious Times at the Spessart Inn (1967) - Hugo
- Zum Teufel mit der Penne (1968) - Dr. Burki
- Rebellion of the Lost (1969, TV miniseries) - Heinrich Kühn
