= The Flying Classroom (1973 film) =

1973 film

- Directed by: Werner Jacobs
- Written by: Erich Kästner (novel); Franz Seitz
- Produced by: Franz Seitz
- Starring: Joachim Fuchsberger; Heinz Reincke; Diana Körner
- Cinematography: Wolfgang Treu
- Edited by: Adolf Schlyssleder
- Music by: Rolf A. Wilhelm
- Production companies: Franz Seitz Filmproduktion; Terra-Filmkunst
- Distributed by: Constantin Film
- Release date: 26 October 1973
- Running time: 92 minutes
- Country: West Germany
- Language: German

The Flying Classroom (German: Das fliegende Klassenzimmer) is a 1973 West German comedy film directed by Werner Jacobs and starring Joachim Fuchsberger, Heinz Reincke and Diana Körner. Two classes in a school have a running feud. It is based on The Flying Classroom, a novel by Erich Kästner.

It was shot on location around Bamberg in Bavaria.

== Partial cast ==
- Joachim Fuchsberger as Dr. Johannes Bökh (nicknamed "Justus" or "the just")
- Heinz Reincke as Dr. Robert Uthofft (nicknamed "Nichtraucher" or "Non-smoker")
- Diana Körner as Nurse Beate
- Bernd Herzsprung as Theodor Laban
- Otto Bolesch as Professor Kreuzkamm
- Anita Mally as Inge Kreuzkamm
- Tilo von Berlepsch as Director Grünkern
- Gudula Blau as Mrs. von Simmern
- Wolfgang Schwarz as Mr. von Simmern
- Otto Kurth as Otto Carstens
- Robert Jarczyk as Johnny Trotz
- Thomas Eggert as Sebastian Frank
- Daniel Mueller as Uli von Simmern

== Bibliography ==
- Hans-Michael Bock and Tim Bergfelder. The Concise Cinegraph: An Encyclopedia of German Cinema. Berghahn Books, 2009.
