= Morgen fällt die Schule aus =

1971 film

Morgen fällt die Schule aus is a 1971 West German comedy film directed by Werner Jacobs and starring Heintje Simons, Hansi Kraus and Rudolf Schündler. It was the sixth in the Die Lümmel von der ersten Bank series of comedy films.

== Cast ==
- Heintje Simons: Pit van Dongen
- Hansi Kraus: Pepe Nietnagel
- Theo Lingen: Headmaster Dr. Taft
- Rudolf Schündler: Teacher Dr. Knörz
- Ralf Wolter: Teacher Dr. Geis
- Fritz Tillmann: Kurt Nietnagel
- Heinz Reincke: Mr. van Dongen
- Hans Terofal: Pedell Georg Bloch
- Balduin Baas: Teacher Dr. Blaumeier
- Eva Maria Meineke: Mrs Dr. Knörz
- Monika Dahlberg: Mrs. Schmitz
- Evelyn Opela: Fräulein Dr. Lang
- Franz Muxeneder: Sergeant
- Carola Höhn: Mrs. Nietnagel
- Charlotte Witthauer: Mrs. Taft
- Hugo Lindinger: Hunter
- Jutta Speidel: Lydia Meier
- Otto Vogler: Herr Vogler
- Gerhard Acktun: Student
- Josef Moosholzer: Teacher
- Marc Nissimoff: Teacher
- Franz Seitz: Briefmarkenhändler
