= Beamter =

Type of civil servant in German-speaking countries

The German civil servants called Beamte (men, singular Beamter, German: [bəˈʔamtɐ], more commonly der Beamte; women, singular Beamtin) have a privileged legal status compared to other German public employees (called Angestellte), who are generally subject to the same laws and regulations as employees in the private sector. For example, the state can only sack Beamte if they commit a felony.

The tradition of classifying only some public employees as Beamte dates back to the "enlightened rule" of monarchs practised in 18th-century Prussia and other German states. These states did not accept "radical" concepts such as democracy or popular sovereignty, but they did try to professionalise their public services and to reduce corruption and favouritism. The idea was that whoever represents the state by undertaking official duties which only the state may legally provide (hoheitliche Aufgaben), such as issuing official documents, teaching state-approved curricula to students, preaching in state-approved churches, or making any other kind of official decisions, should have a special legal status and relationship with the state that demands a higher than normal degree of loyalty. At its core, that loyalty is regarded as mutual, with Beamte having a special duty of service (Dienstpflicht) going beyond the duties of salaried workers, with the state having a special duty of seeing to their welfare (Fürsorgepflicht) that likewise goes beyond what would be expected of a commercial employer. Some people believe that once Beamtenstatus (i.e. tenure for life as a civil servant) is conferred, civil servants lack further professional motivation, to the detriment of those they are appointed to serve.

While soldiers and judges are not considered Beamte in Germany, many of the same rules apply to them. However, unlike Beamte, judges are not subject to the usual hierarchy and order of command of government, in order to preserve judicial independence. Similarly, unlike Beamte, soldiers cannot be ordered to act in any manner unrelated to the defence of the state (with the exception of providing peaceful aid in specific emergency situations laid down by law), so as to preserve the civilian nature of the German government.

== Privileges and restrictions ==
Under Art. 33(5) of the Basic Law, appointment as a Beamter is for life and subject to public law, not private-law employment regulations. There is no contract of employment between the Beamter and the state entity employing them. Beamte possess a range of privileges. These include:

- a special health plan, the Beihilfe, which covers 50% of most health care expenses for the Beamter, their spouse, and dependent children, with the Beamter being responsible for the remainder of the cover (usually achieved by taking out private health insurance);
- an index-linked pension of at most 71.75% of final salary, paid directly by the state rather than by the usual public pension provider (unlike those who receive a normal pension, Beamte must pay income tax on the entirety of their pension income);
- exemption from all social security contributions, although they are, like all other employees, subject to income tax;
- near-ironclad job security – the state may transfer Beamte who do not perform well to other, often less desirable (but not less paid), posts, but can only terminate their employment entirely in cases of serious felonies.

There are also a number of restrictions on Beamte:

- Unlike all other public or private employees, they have no right to strike.
- Their salary and working hours are determined by law, rather than by negotiations between employers and unions. As a result, the usual working week for ordinary public employees is 38.5 hours, whereas for Beamte it is now between 40 and 42 hours, depending on the entity employing the Beamter.
- If they opt in to Germany's public health insurance services, they face tight restrictions, must cover both the employee's and the employer's contributions, and cannot include their spouses or dependent children.
- If they resign from their post, they receive only the very low basic unemployment benefits, not the unemployment insurance benefits, since they do not pay unemployment insurance;
- If they are removed from active duty due to misconduct, they lose not only their salary, but also all retirement benefits ("Pension") and have no coverage of health-care costs because they never have been insured.
- Beamte who commit a crime – whether on or off duty – face double punishment, since they are subject to both the criminal law and internal disciplinary procedures.
- Beamte can be punished for accepting benefits that are linked to their official role or function and that are provided by third parties. This punishment for receiving an advantage through the position is reaching much further than the prosecution for bribery because in contrast to bribery no favour has to be granted in return.
- Beamte have fewer rights to engage in political work.

Entities that may employ Beamte include the federal government, the 16 state governments and all local authorities, certain corporations, agencies and foundations governed by public law, such as the Catholic and Lutheran churches, whose priests have a status similar to that of Beamte. These are not, however, employed by the state but by the churches in their capacity as corporations of public law.

== Becoming a Beamter ==
A prospective Beamter must be a national of the Federal Republic of Germany or of a member state of the European Union (although there are now multiple exceptions), and must generally achieve the status by the age of 35. There are four professional career tracks for Beamte, depending on their education:

- Einfacher Dienst (lower grades), mainly for positions of menial work, which has mostly fallen out of use. Similar to enlisted ranks excluding non-commissioned officers.
- Mittlerer Dienst (intermediate grades), mainly for positions requiring roughly the equivalent of a completed apprenticeship. Similar to non-commissioned officers.
- Gehobener Dienst (advanced graded), mainly for positions requiring a bachelor's degree or its equivalent. This bachelor's degree is often obtained whilst studying at a public institute of higher education provided, and working as a trainee Beamter. Similar to company grade or junior field grade officer (who however in many cases obtain a master's degree before taking up a troop post).
- Höherer Dienst (higher grades), restricted to graduates holding a master's degree or its equivalent. Similar to military officers of rank major and above, and to all judges.

Transition from a lower to a more senior career track is possible (so-called Laufbahnaufstieg, "career track enhancement").

Teachers of primary and II and III class secondary schools have a position unofficially between upper and senior service (to which latter the I class secondary school teachers belong, as they begin their service in the highest pay grade of upper service and can by promotion reach senior service (yet in the case of primary teachers, promotion is practically restricted to the principal).

Conferral of the status of Beamter does not involve any contract, but formal letters of appointment (Ernennungsurkunde). The new Beamter's first task is to swear the oath of office, including a pledge to uphold and protect the federal laws and the constitution, and – where the employing entity is not the federal government – the constitution and laws of the respective state. Additionally, new Beamte have to table a medical supervision screening in order to prove their physical (and to some extent psychological) ability to serve in this type of fixed, decades-long career. Furthermore, they are subject to a prior screening by the police and judiciary – in order to exclude convicted offenders, extremists, and people with false credentials.

There are typically three steps involved in becoming a Beamter with full tenure for life:

1. For all four career tracks (lower, middle, upper and senior civil service) there are specially designed training schemes lasting one year (lower service), two years (middle service) or three years (senior and upper service), including oral and written exams as well as a dissertation. There are exceptions for highly technical tasks. Trainee Beamte usually have the title Anwärter, preceded by the official term of the position, e.g. Regierungssekretärsanwärter (RSA, Trainee Government Secretary) or Kriminalkommissaranwärter (KKA, Trainee Detective Inspector). Trainee officials of the senior service are called Referendare, e.g. Studienreferendar for a trainee teacher. They receive a special salary and hold the legal status of Beamter, albeit without tenure for life.
2. The trainee period is followed by a probationary period. This period usually lasts three years, occasionally longer. The salary is based on the salary grade which the Beamter will hold upon achieving tenure for life. Usually, the designation of office precedes the abbreviation "z. A." (zur Anstellung), which means "to be employed", e.g. Regierungsinspektor z. A. Again, there is an exception with regard to the senior service, where probationary Beamte may be called Rat z. A. (e.g. Studienrat z. A., Regierungsrat z. A.), or, alternatively, Assessor, although this is now less common.
3. The official becomes a Beamter auf Lebenszeit, i.e. a Beamter with full tenure for life.

It should be borne in mind that, whether applicants undergo steps 1, 2, or 3, they are already hold the status of Beamter, although initially in training or on probation. It is also important to know, that normally it is impossible to become a Beamter after the age of 45.

== Fields of work ==
The status of Beamter is held by administrative officials, but also by policemen, prison guards, customs officers, most teachers and university professors, and other professionals in the public service, and by certain holders of political offices such as mayors (but not ministers, who have a peculiar, but similar, status governed by public law). For holders of political office, the status of Beamter is not permanent, only applying during the term of office. Furthermore, while most teachers in the western states of Germany are Beamte, this is not necessarily the case in eastern (former GDR) states. Berlin, for example, abolished the status of Beamter for teachers in 2005, but reintroduced it in 2023.

Formerly, Beamter status used to be bestowed more liberally. As it results in permanent tenure, there are still many Beamte amongst those working for the German post office (Deutsche Post and Deutsche Telekom), the railway services (Deutsche Bahn), and other public utility companies, many of which are either no longer state-owned or have been converted into companies governed by private rather than public law. New employees at those entities are no longer made Beamte. Privatisation and reductions in the number of established posts have reduced the overall number of Beamte. Since 1991, the number of Beamte has declined by 1.4 million to around 3.9 million. This meant that, as of January 2007, reunited Germany had fewer Beamte than the old Federal Republic of Germany.

Local authority staff is split: about one-third are Beamte, mostly in higher administrative positions, and two-thirds are ordinary employees.

== Income ==
All Beamte were once paid according to the Bundesbesoldungsgesetz (Federal Payment Law), regardless of who the employing entity was (the federal government, the 16 states, local authorities or other corporations, agencies and foundations governed by public law). This has now changed. The 16 states have the option to vary salaries. Nonetheless, the Federal Government still keeps a close eye on the respective state Besoldungsgesetze, which may only differ up to 5% from the Federal Salary Scheme.

In Germany, Beamte have permanent tenure, i.e. they cannot normally be dismissed, receive certain privileges, and are usually remunerated more generously than ordinary employees. In addition, they are exempt from all social security contributions such as pension or unemployment insurance. Dismissal is permissible for prolonged periods of illness, i.e. three months within half a year, but in this case, the Beamter can only be retired if they are not able to go back to work within the next six months. It is also possible to dismiss the Beamter during the probationary period, and thereafter the Beamter can be retired and given a pension based on years of service.

In the new states which once constituted the German Democratic Republic, most teachers are not Beamte, with the possible exception of head teachers and certain specialists (lecturers teaching at schools providing vocational education or at grammar schools).

Salary is usually counted by month (as opposed to the custom in English-speaking countries, or also German tax law, to count it by year). Apart from the salary group, it also depends (in orders A, R and C) on the number of years served. Bypassing additions (for family or special positions, etc.) and variations in sub-federal law, the monthly salary for the lowest possible order (A2) is €1845.90, that for a beginning detective (A9) is €3,464.26, that for a beginning Gymnasium teacher (A13) or state attorney or local judge (R1) is in either case €5,197.69, that of a Gymnasium principal (A16) at the end of their career may be up to €8,978.48 and that of a State Secretary is €16,566.89.

Beamte only pay income tax but do not pay social insurance contributions. Their salary is considered an alimentation that comprises the reimbursement of health care costs and continues at a lower level during retirement. As appointment is considered life-long no unemployment insurance is paid. This means that their income after tax is much higher than that of other civil servants or workers in private companies with a comparable gross salary.

== Designations of office ==
In the German civil service (regardless of whether concerning the federal government, the 16 states or other entities), the official title of designation held by the Beamter is tied to one of the salary grades of the Federal Payment Act, on which the individual states base their own remuneration legislation.

The following lists are very generalised, especially in order B Beamte tend to have very specialised titles; thus, mayors, ambassadors, and presidents of districts and states will be fitted in somewhere depending on the importance of their office. For information's sake, judges and federal ministers who are not Beamte are included (state prosecutors are, though). In the table, the same thing has been done to the general military ranks (without notice of naval ranks and other deviations).

Lower service (mostly abolished or in abeyance)

- A1: Amtsgehilfe (now abolished)
- A2: Oberamtsgehilfe, Wachtmeister (now abolished)
- A3: Hauptamtsgehilfe, Oberwachtmeister
- A4: Amtsmeister, Hauptwachtmeister
- A5: Oberamtsmeister, Erster Hauptwachtmeister
- A6: Oberamtsmeister, Erster Hauptwachtmeister
- A6+Z: Oberamtsmeister, Erster Hauptwachtmeister (salary according to slightly incremental schedule A6)

Middle service:

- A5: Werkführer, Assistant (now rare)
- A6: Werkmeister, Oberassistent, Sekretär
- A7: Meister, Obersekretär
- A8: Obermeister, Hauptsekretär, e.g. Oberbrandmeister (fire fighter), Polizeiobermeister (policeman)
- A9: Hauptmeister, Amtsinspektor
- A9+Z: Erster Hauptmeister, Erster Amtsinspektor (salary according to slightly incremental schedule A9)

Upper service:

- A9: Inspektor, e.g. Regierungsinspektor
- A10: Oberinspektor
- A11: Amtmann
- A12: Amtsrat
- A13: Oberamtsrat
- A13+Z: Oberamtsrat (salary according to slightly incremental schedule A13)

Upper service at the police (police officer):

- A9: Kommissar, e.g. Kriminalkommissar or Polizeikommissar (partially in abeyance)
- A10: Oberkommissar
- A11: Hauptkommissar
- A12: Hauptkommissar
- A13: Erster Hauptkommissar, e.g. Erster Kriminal- or Polizeihauptkommissar

Senior service (advisors, senior advisors, managers):

- A13: Rat, e.g.: Studienrat, Akademischer Rat, Major, Medizinalrat, Baurat, Bibliotheksrat, Verwaltungsrat, Regierungsrat
- A14: Oberrat, e.g. Akademischer Oberrat, Oberstudienrat, Oberregierungsrat
- A15: Direktor, e.g. Polizeidirektor, Kriminaldirektor, Psychologiedirektor, Pharmaziedirektor
- A15+Z: Direktor, e.g. Studiendirektor, Psychologiedirektor (quite rare, salary according to slightly incremental schedule A15)
- A16: Leitender Direktor, e.g. Leitender Veterdinärdirektor, Leitender Medizinaldirektor, Ministerialrat, Oberstudiendirektor
- B1: Direktor und Professor (only in scientific institutions)
- B2: Abteilungsdirektor (Departmental Director), Direktor und Professor
- B3: Ministerialrat (ministerial advisor, usually (senior) head of unit)
- B4: Erster Direktor, Regierungsvizepräsident
- B5: Ministerialdirigent (on state level in positions of lesser importance)
- B6: Ministerialdirigent (in some states and on federal level), Präsident (head of senior federal institutions, e.g. Federal Archive)
- B7: Präsident (of larger federal offices)
- B8: Präsident (head of a limited number of large federal offices)
- B9: Ministerialdirektor (approximately equivalent to Undersecretary of State), Bürgermeister (Lord Mayor of cities above about 100,000 inhabitants), Präsident (head of a small number of the most important federal offices)
- B10: Präsident der BaFin) (and some other, very rare, posts)
- B11: Staatssekretär (state secretary – this applies only to permanent, not parliamentary, secretaries of state, though federal parliamentary secretaries receive similar payment)
- Bundesminister: 1 1/3 × B11 (Federal Ministers)
- Bundeskanzler: 1 2/3 × B11 (Federal Chancellor)
- Bundespräsident: 1 5/6 × B11 (Federal President)

(The last three do not technically qualify as Beamte, but are state officials sui generis.)

- W1: Juniorprofessor
- W2: Professor/University Professor
- W3: Professor/University Professor (often as a director of an institute or holder of a chair)
- C1: Wissenschaftlicher/Künstlerischer Assistent – grade in abeyance
- C2: Wissenschaftlicher/Künstlerischer Oberassistent – grade in abeyance
- C3: Professor (Extraordinarius) – grade in abeyance
- C4: Full Professor (Ordinarius; Lehrstuhlinhaber (rare)) – grade in abeyance

Concerning schemes C and W, see below. The W-classification was introduced in 2002 to replace the C-classification for new appointments with the intention to allow salary negotiations for high profile individuals, although the W scale starts on a lower level than the C scale and does not increase with age (comparison between base levels W3 to C4 and W2 to C3, respectively).

- R1: Staatsanwalt, Richter am Amtsgericht, Richter am Landgericht
- R2: Oberstaatsanwalt, Richter am Oberlandesgericht, Vorsitzender Richter am Landgericht
- R3: Leitender Oberstaatsanwalt R3, Vorsitzender Richter am Oberlandesgericht
- R4: Leitender Oberstaatsanwalt R4
- R5: Generalstaatsanwalt
- R6: Generalstaatsanwalt, Bundesanwalt, Präsident des Landgerichts (or des Amtsgerichts), Richter am Bundesgerichtshof
- R7: Abteilungsleiter bei der Bundesanwaltschaft
- R8: Vorsitzender Richter am Bundesgerichtshof, Präsident des Oberlandesgerichts
- R9: Generalbundesanwalt
- R10: Präsident(en) der Bundesgerichte, Richter am Bundesverfassungsgericht
- 1 1/6 × B11: Vizepräsident des Bundesverfassungsgerichts
- 1 1/3 × B11: Präsident des Bundesverfassungsgerichts

Salary Orders B, C, W and R all belong to the Senior Service; the Order B follows on from Order A.

Some titles can roughly be compared to offices held by British or other civil servants.

Overview of civil service grades
Scheme	Grade	Office name/term	Examples (abbr. only for internal usage)	cf. Military rank	Civil service career law
A	2	Oberamtsgehilfe			Lower service
A	3	Hauptamtsgehilfe		Grenadier, Gefreiter	Lower service
A	4	Amtsmeister		Obergefreiter, Hauptgefreiter	Lower service
A	5	Oberamtsmeister		Stabsgefreiter, Oberstabsgefreiter, Unteroffizier	Lower service
A	6	Oberamtsmeister Erster Klasse			Lower service
A	6	Sekretär	Regierungssekretär (RS)	Stabsunteroffizier	Middle Service
A	7	Meister, Obersekretär	Polizeimeister (PM)	Feldwebel, Oberfeldwebel	Middle Service
A	8	Obermeister, Hauptsekretär	Regierungshauptsekretär (RHS)	Hauptfeldwebel	Middle Service
A	9	Hauptmeister, Amtsinspektor	Hauptbrandmeister (HBM)	Stabsfeldwebel, Oberstabsfeldwebel	Middle Service
A	9	Inspektor, Kommissar	Regierungsinspektor	Leutnant	Upper service
A	10	Oberinspektor, Oberkommissar	Regierungsoberinspektor (ROI)	Oberleutnant	Upper service
A	11	Amtmann, Hauptkommissar	Regierungsamtsmann (RA)	Hauptmann	Upper service
A	12	Amtsrat, Hauptkommissar A12	Kriminalhauptkommissar (KHK)	Hauptmann	Upper service
A	13	Oberamtsrat, Erster Hauptkommissar	Regierungsoberamtsrat (ROAR)	Stabshauptmann	Upper service
A	13	Rat	Studienrat (StR)	Major	Senior Service
A	14	Oberrat	Oberregierungsrat (ORR)	Oberstleutnant	Senior Service
A	15	Direktor	Kriminaldirektor (KD)	Oberstleutnant	Senior Service
A	16	Leitender Direktor, Oberdirektor, Ministerialrat	Leitender Regierungsdirektor (LRD/LtdRD)	Oberst	Senior Service

There are also colonels in B3 paygrade. The paygrade of a brigadier general is B6, that of a major general B7, that of a lieutenant general B9 and that of a full general B10.

=== Secondary employment ===
Due to the exclusive and intense mutual relationship between state institution and Beamter, possibilities for engaging into secondary employments are strictly regulated by the basic laws governing Beamte. In general these are limited to few hours per week and additional income beyond a very low threshold has to be delivered to the state. Exceptions are only made for academic professors (W2–W3 and C3–C4) where provisions are made especially for those who represent "free professions" like medicine, certain legal professions and pharmacists. Beamte who are Professors of Clinical Medicine usually have treatment privileges at the respective university hospitals in most states.

== Federal Oath of Office of the Federal Republic of Germany ==
Ich schwöre, das Grundgesetz für die Bundesrepublik Deutschland und alle in der Bundesrepublik geltenden Gesetze zu wahren und meine Amtspflichten gewissenhaft zu erfüllen. [So wahr mir Gott helfe.]

Translation:

I swear to uphold the Basic Law of the Federal Republic of Germany and all laws valid in the Federal Republic and to fulfil my official duties conscientiously. [So help me God.]

The oath can be sworn either with or without the religious imprecation So wahr mir Gott helfe ("So help me God") at the end.

== Beamte, judges and soldiers ==
Although officially not having the status of Beamte, Richter (judges) and Soldaten (soldiers for a fixed term of two years above; this does not include (former) conscripts and volunteers of up to 23 months) have similar rights and duties to Beamte. For one thing, they are also paid according to the Bundesbesoldungsgesetz; soldiers according to Orders A and B, and judges according to Order R, as are public prosecutors. The latter are, nevertheless, Beamte; soldiers and judges are not. Furthermore, they practically cannot be dismissed, and have the same income. Soldiers and judges are also expected to swear an oath on the Constitution.

Judges are not Beamte, although they were until the mid-1950s. Until then, judges were also paid according to Order A, and usually had the titles Justizrat or Gerichtsrat. However, officials represent the executive branch of government, while judges are independent of the government. Beamte have a duty to obey direct orders from a superior, which is incompatible with an independent system of justice.

== Public image of Beamten ==
Beamte suffer from an image problem in Germany. A study conducted by the German Civil Service Federation (DBB) concluded that 61% of the German population thought Beamte to be "lazy, lethargic, inflexible, stubborn or corrupt". Other common points of contention, among the German public, are that Beamte are paid excessive salaries and cannot be removed from their positions for any reason other than engaging in serious criminal conduct or being incapacitated.

== The Federal Remuneration Law ==
There are several different Remuneration Orders (Besoldungsordnungen): A (for most Beamte and soldiers), B (for ministerial officials), C (for university professors and lecturers; now replaced by W for newly employed lecturers), R (for public prosecutors and all judges) and W for university lecturers and professors. The salaries in order A are organized in steps, with pay increasing based on the duration of service. The different groups reach from A2 to A 16 (A1 was abolished in the 1970s). A2 to A5/6 belong to the Lower Service, A 6 to A 9 to the Middle Service, A 9 to A 13 to the Upper Service and A 13 to A 16 to the Senior Service. The other orders, B, C, R and W, also belong to the Senior Service. German law refers to this as the principle of career tracks or Laufbahnprinzip, based on academic qualifications.

- Beamte of the Middle Service are required to have passed their Realschulabschluss, preferably some further experience.
- To join the Upper Service, all applicants need the Abitur, followed by taking a degree at a college owned by entity for the purpose of training future Beamte.
- Traditionally, most Beamte in the Senior Service held a university state exam, then equivalent to a university diploma or master's degree, at a time when law and teacher training was still regulated by the state (law still is). However, the common requirement these days is a master's degree or equivalent, or a state exam in law. Gymnasium teachers now commonly hold a B.A. in two or three subjects, and a master's degree in education. In Baden-Württemberg, the annual starting salary for a single teacher without children (A13) is €45,511.92 pre-tax.
- Top salaries can be as high as €180,897.60 (B11) also considering that the top positions in the system is alimented on this level using a multplicator of 1 5/6. During retirement the alimentation continues at up to 71.75% of the salary that was received in the two years before retirement.

== Comparison to civil servants in other countries ==
Although a common translation for Beamter is civil servant, there are major differences from the British Civil Service, which refers to employees within government departments and not, for example, teachers or postmen. A better translation is public servant, being permanently employed within the public sector.

Another country whose entire administrative structure is based on an officialdom comparable to that of Germany is Austria, where Beamte even often have the same titles, e.g. Rat ("councillor" or "counsellor"). Most cantons and the federal government of Switzerland have abolished their officialdom.

== See also ==
- Academic ranks in Germany
