= Doctor Faustus (1982 film) =

1982 film

- Film poster
- Directed by: Franz Seitz
- Written by: Thomas Mann; Franz Seitz
- Produced by: Franz Seitz
- Starring: Jon Finch
- Cinematography: Rudolf Blahacek
- Music by: Rolf Alexander Wilhelm
- Release date: 16 September 1982
- Running time: 179 minutes
- Country: West Germany
- Language: German

Doctor Faustus (German: Doktor Faustus) is a 1982 West German drama film directed by Franz Seitz, based on the 1947 novel by Thomas Mann. It was entered into the 13th Moscow International Film Festival where it won the Silver Prize.

== Cast ==
- Jon Finch as Adrian Leverkühn
- André Heller as Satan
- Hanns Zischler as Dr. Serenius
- Margot Hielscher as Senatorin Rodde
- Siemen Rühaak as Schwertfeger
- Lothar G. Buchheim as Dr. Erasmi
- Marie-Hélène Breillat as Marie Godeau
- Gaby Dohm as Elsbeth Leverkühn, Adrian's Mother
- Heinz Weiss as Jonathan Leverkühn
- Siegfried Palm as Wendell Kretzschmar
- Wilfried Klaus as Professor Institoris
- Alice Treff as Aunt Isabeau
- Hans Korte as Professor Kumpf
- Eva Ingeborg Scholz as Frau Butze
- Elma Karlowa as Coco
- Herbert Grönemeyer as Deutschlin
- Gerhard Polt as Janitor
- Balduin Baas
- Veronika Fitz
