= Bernd Herzsprung =

German actor (born 1942)

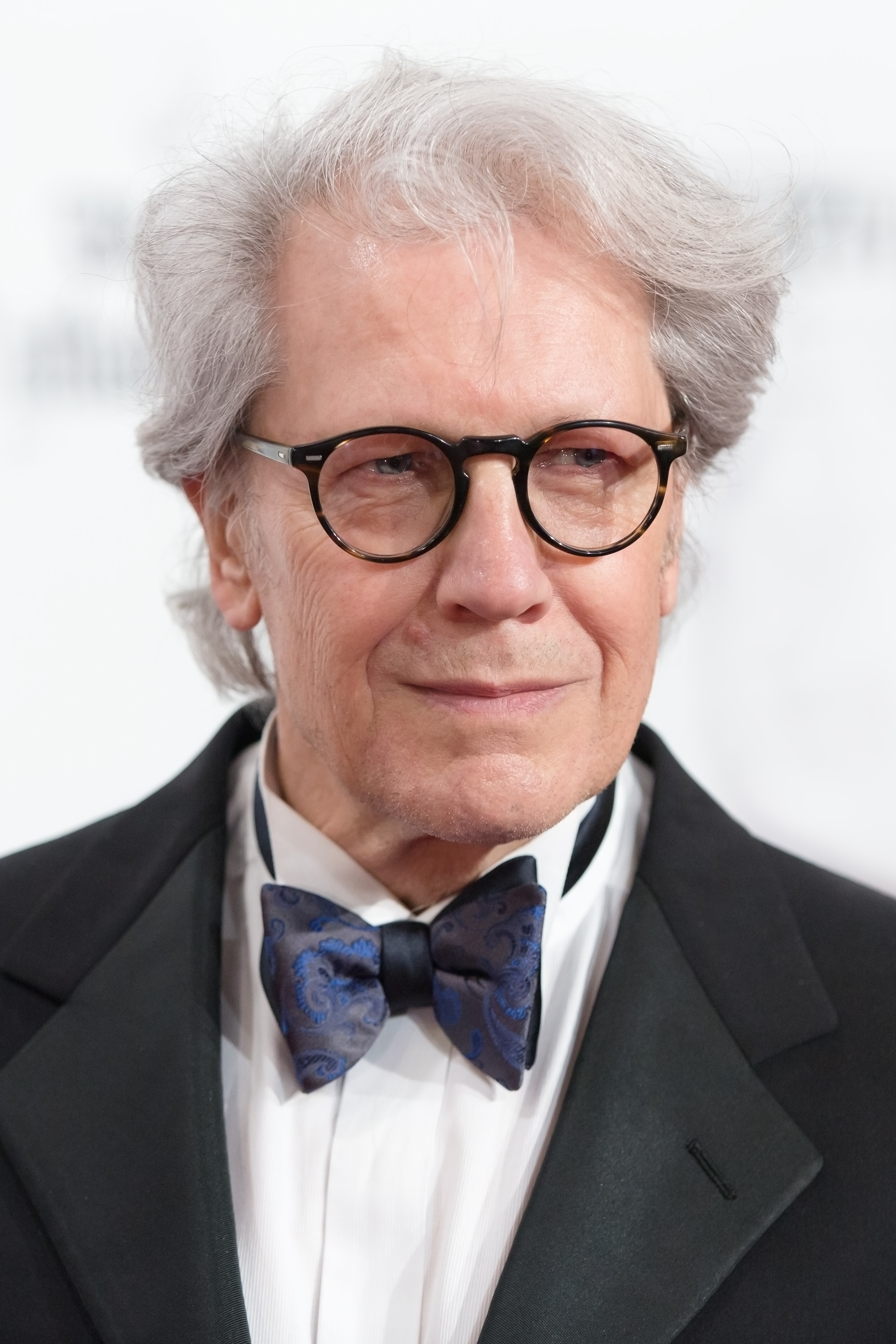
- Herzsprung in 2016
- Born: Bernd Herzsprung; March 22, 1942 (age 83); Hamburg, Germany
- Occupation: Actor
- Website: bernd-herzsprung.de

Bernd Herzsprung (born March 22, 1942, in Hamburg, Germany) is a German television actor.

Herzsprung completed his acting training with Joseph Offenbach and then played in theaters in Hamburg (including the Deutsches Schauspielhaus in The Captain of Köpenick with Werner Hinz, the Ernst Deutsch Theater in Tom Stoppard's Rosencrantz and Guildenstern Are Dead) and other cities. On stage, his domain is the Boulevard theatre (Charley's Aunt).

In 1967 he made his film debut in Wilder Reiter GmbH, directed by Franz-Josef Spieker. Other movies followed, like The Flying Classroom in 1973 and Deutschlandlied (Ernst Witzel, 1984).

But Herzsprung was best known for his television roles. Since the late 1960s he played primarily in crime series such as Dem Täter auf der Spur, Der Kommissar, Derrick, Der Alte, Sonderdezernat K1, Ein Fall für zwei and Tatort. Since 1978 he played in the ZDF TV series SOKO 5113 and 1994 he changed to the series Freunde fürs Leben (until 2000). In the ARD television series Familie Dr. Kleist, he played the role of the mayor of Eisenach. In the comedy Hengstparade he played alongside Christiane Hörbiger and Michael Mendl.

Herzsprung was married from 1979 until 2008. Of his two daughters with Barbara Engel, Hannah Herzsprung is also an actress.

In 2011 he was a candidate in the RTL format Let's Dance. On 20 April 2011, he was eliminated after a samba in sixth position.

== Selected filmography ==
- Wilder Reiter GmbH (1967)
- The Twins from Immenhof (1973)
- The Flying Classroom (1973)
- Derrick - Season 2, Episode 3: "Angst" (1976, TV)
- SOKO 5113 (1978–1992, TV series)
- Derrick - Season 6, Episode 9: "Ein Kongreß in Berlin" (1979, TV)
- Derrick - Season 8, Episode 2: "Der Kanal" (1981, TV)
- Sting in the Flesh (1981)
- Deutschlandlied (1984)
- Eine Frau für gewisse Stunden (1985)
- Goldene Zeiten (2006)
- Ein unverbesserlicher Dickkopf (2007)
- Everything Is Love (2014)
