= Eva Probst =

German actress (1930–2018)

- Born: 2 April 1930; Berlin-Kreuzberg
- Died: 19 November 2018 (aged 88); Berlin
- Occupation: Actress
- Notable work: Gute Zeiten, schlechte Zeiten

Eva Irene Probst (21 April 1930 – 19 November 2018) was a German actress.

== Biography ==
Born in Berlin-Kreuzberg, Probst was married to Austrian actor Gerhard Riedmann from 1954-60. In the 1950s, she starred in romantic comedy films and Heimatfilme. From its inception in 1992 until the following year, she played Jessica Naumann in the German soap opera, Gute Zeiten, schlechte Zeiten.

Probst died on 25 November 2018 at the age of 88 in a Berlin retirement home.

== Selected filmography ==
- Only One Night (1950)
- Stips (1951)
- I Lost My Heart in Heidelberg (1952)
- Prosecutor Corda (1953)
- The Bird Seller (1953)
- Son Without a Home (1955)
- The Major and the Bulls (1955)
- Three Days Confined to Barracks (1955)
- As Long as the Roses Bloom (1956)
