= The Duck Rings at Half Past Seven =

1968 film

- Directed by: Rolf Thiele
- Written by: Riccardo Ghione; Paul Hengge
- Based on: Vi er allesammen tossed by Aage Stentoft
- Produced by: Erwin Gitt; Luggi Waldleitner
- Starring: Heinz Rühmann; Hertha Feiler; Graziella Granata
- Cinematography: Wolf Wirth
- Edited by: Ingeborg Taschner
- Music by: Martin Böttcher
- Production companies: Roxy Film; Sancro International Film
- Distributed by: Constantin Film
- Release date: 13 September 1968
- Running time: 88 minutes
- Countries: Italy; West Germany
- Language: German

The Duck Rings at Half Past Seven (German: Die Ente klingelt um halb acht) is a 1968 Italian-West German comedy film directed by Rolf Thiele and starring Heinz Rühmann, Hertha Feiler and Graziella Granata. It was shot at the Bavaria Studios in Munich. The film's sets were designed by the art directors Wolf Englert and Herbert Strabel.

== Synopsis ==
Computer engineer Doctor Alexander collides with an elephant and when he excitedly explains this to a police patrol he finds himself sent to a mental institution where he sets about disrupting the routines.

== Cast ==
- Heinz Rühmann as Dr. Alexander
- Hertha Feiler as Adele
- Graziella Granata as Dr Jaspers
- Charles Regnier as Professor Sauermann
- John van Dreelen as Rechtsanwalt Kellermann
- Balduin Baas as Lesender
- Rudolf Schündler as Staatsanwalt
- Alexander Allerson as Tommy
- Monica Teuber as Ulrike
- Inge Marschall as Krankenschwester
- Angela Hillebrecht as Ilse
- Hans Epskamp as Polizeiarzt
- Herbert Bötticher as Verkäufer
- Sammy Drechsel as Reporter

== Bibliography ==
- Bock, Hans-Michael & Bergfelder, Tim. The Concise CineGraph. Encyclopedia of German Cinema. Berghahn Books, 2009..
- Rabkin, Leslie Y. The Celluloid Couch: An Annotated International Filmography of the Mental Health Professional in the Movies and Television, from the Beginning to 1990. Scarecrow Press, 1998.
