= Rudolf Schündler =

German actor and director (1906–1988)

- Born: Rudolf Ernst Paul Schündler; 17 April 1906; Leipzig, Saxony, German Empire
- Died: 12 December 1988 (aged 82); Munich, West Germany
- Occupation: Actor
- Years active: 1924–1988

Rudolf Ernst Paul Schündler (17 April 1906, in Leipzig – 12 December 1988, in Munich) was a German actor and director. Schündler appeared in over 250 film and television productions between 1924 and his death, often in supporting roles as a character actor. Additionally, he directed more than two dozen film and television productions during the 1950s and 1960s.

One of his early film roles was in Fritz Lang's The Testament of Dr. Mabuse (1933). One of his best-known roles to German audiciences was the befuddled teacher Dr. Arthur Knörz in the school comedy film series Die Lümmel von der ersten Bank ("The Slackers from the Front Row") during the late 1960s and the 1970s. Among his international roles were Karl in The Exorcist (1973) and Professor Milius in Suspiria (1977), both horror film classics of that time.

On stage, he appeared in comical roles and as a kabarettist. He co-founded the political cabaret "Die Schaubude" in Munich in the post-war era, but it had to close after just three years in 1948.

Shortly after finishing the film The Nasty Girl, Schündler died of a heart attack in Germany, aged 82. The film was released in 1990, two years after his death.

== Filmography ==
=== Director ===
- The Violin Maker of Mittenwald (1950)
- Victoria and Her Hussar (1954)
- The Faithful Hussar (1954)
- The Happy Village (1955)
- The Beautiful Master (1956)
- Greetings and Kisses from Tegernsee (1957)
- Mikosch, the Pride of the Company
- Mein Mädchen ist ein Postillion (1958)
- Gräfin Mariza (1958)
- Mein Schatz, komm mit ans blaue Meer (1959)
- Willy the Private Detective (1960)
- Always Trouble with the Bed (1961)
- Café Oriental (1962)
- Wild Water (1962)

=== Actor ===
- Roulette (1924) as Reginald
- Only on the Rhine (1930)
- Annemarie, die Braut der Kompanie (1932) as Leutnant Williams
- The Testament of Dr. Mabuse (1933) as Hardy
- Hundred Days (1935) as Gaillard
- Joan of Arc (1935)
- Savoy Hotel 217 (1936) as Geschäftsführer des 'Savoy'
- Moscow-Shanghai (1936) as Galgenvogel
- Intermezzo (1936) as Rundfunk-Reporter
- Romance (1936) as Hartwig – Sekretär
- Ride to Freedom (1937) as Polnischer Student
- Heiratsinstitut Ida und Co (1937) as Peter – Riedingers Neffe
- Das Schweigen im Walde (1937) as Martin, Diener
- Gewitterflug zu Claudia (1937) as Kloemkes – Bordfunker
- Mit versiegelter Order (1938) as Holzmann – Legationsrat
- The Stars Shine (1938) as Versicherungsmann
- The Woman at the Crossroads (1938) as Graup
- By a Silken Thread (1938) as Von Tettenboom
- Scheidungsreise (1938) as Young Lawyer
- Napoleon Is to Blame for Everything (1938) as Rundfunkreporter
- Dreizehn Mann und eine Kanone (1938)
- Adventure in Love (1939) as Sekretär des Polizeipräsidenten
- The Green Emperor (1939) (uncredited)
- Ich verweigere die Aussage (1939)
- Robert and Bertram (1939) as Gäst bei Ipelmeyer
- Woman Without a Past (1939) as Kriminalassistent Semmler
- Bachelor's Paradise (1939) as Lawyer (uncredited)
- Kitty and the World Conference (1939) as Rundfunkreporter
- The Golden Mask (1939) as Olden
- Alarm at Station III (1939) as Inspektor Henning
- Hurrah! I'm a Father (1939) as Freund von Peter
- Der Stammbaum des Dr. Pistorius (1939) as Freiherr von Bekker
- Ursula Under Suspicion (1939) as Gast bei Tweels
- Weißer Flieder (1940) as Max Mohr, Reklamezeichner bei Rössler
- Tip auf Amalie (1940) as Herr Schmitz
- Golowin geht durch die Stadt (1940) as Jüngling
- Meine Tochter tut das nicht (1940)
- Herz ohne Heimat (1940) as Peter Brack
- Achtung! Feind hört mit (1940) as Zeichner Herbert Grelling
- Kleider machen Leute (1940) as Konfektionshändler Melcher-Böhni in Goldach
- Der Herr im Haus (1940) as Ferdinand von Schwarzendorff
- Alarm (1941) as Produzent des Werbefilms
- The Swedish Nightingale (1941)
- Riding for Germany (1941) as Generaldirektor Brenner
- Immer nur Du (1941) as Komponist
- Sechs Tage Heimaturlaub (1941) as Schütze, Graphologe im Zivilberuf
- His Son (1942) as Der 'Elegante' Juwelendieb und Einbrecher
- Das große Spiel (1942) as Kretschmann
- Front Theatre (1942) as Walter Hülsen
- With the Eyes of a Woman (1942) as Werner
- A Waltz with You (1943) as Schmalfuß, Angestellter im Furioso-Verlag
- Love Premiere (1943) as Der Regisseur
- The Eternal Tone (1943) as Schneidermeister
- Circus Renz (1943) as Litfaß
- Kollege kommt gleich (1943) as Ein entfernter Verwandter von Lilo
- A Man With Principles? (1943) as Peter Ordner, der "Verlobte" Christls
- The Impostor (1944) as Junger Mann
- Ein schöner Tag (1944)
- Das schwarze Schaf (1944)
- Ich hab von Dir geträumt (1944)
- Zimmer zu vermieten (1945)
- Leuchtende Schatten (1945)
- Der Fall Molander (1945)
- Das Mädchen Juanita (1945, uncredited)
- Der Herr vom andern Stern (1948) as Oskar
- Tromba (1949)
- Nothing But Coincidence (1949) as Polizeikommissar
- I'll Make You Happy (1949) as Herr Stock
- Die seltsame Geschichte des Brandner Kaspar (1949) as Dr. Roedel
- Royal Children (1950) as Tintsch
- One Night Apart (1950) as Tobias Nickelmann
- Who Is This That I Love? (1950) as Stefan
- Vier Treppen rechts (1950) as Rudi
- Love on Ice (1950) as Dr. Siegfried Bergmann
- Theodore the Goalkeeper (1950) as Choleriker
- Sensation im Savoy (1950) as Hotelportier
- Kissing Is No Sin (1950)
- Die Sterne lügen nicht (1950) as Der Journalist unterm Regenschirm
- Begierde (1951)
- Das späte Mädchen (1951)
- Eyes of Love (1951) as Dr. Bertram
- The Lady in Black (1951) as Polizeiinspektor Polter
- In München steht ein Hofbräuhaus (1951) as Gottlieb Bömmchen
- House of Life (1952) as Dr. Blümel
- The Blue and White Lion (1952) as Herr von Kleewitz
- We're Dancing on the Rainbow (1952) as Kriminalassistent
- Captain Bay-Bay (1953) as Wüllmann
- Marriage for One Night (1953) as Turnegger
- Mask in Blue (1953) as Inspizient
- When The Village Music Plays on Sunday Nights (1953)
- Heute Nacht passiert's (1953) as Steuerberater Pagel
- The Last Waltz (1953) as Jerome Thibaut
- Wenn der Vater mit dem Sohne (1955) as Herr im Laden
- IA in Oberbayern (1956) as Detektiv
- Isola Bella (1961) as Dr. Bergmann
- Hochzeit am Neusiedler See (1963) as Emanuel Paulini
- Legend of a Gunfighter (1964) as Rufus Harper
- Liebesgrüße aus Tirol (1964) as Prof. Krusius
- The Sinister Monk (1965) as Alfons Short
- Die fromme Helene (1965) as Schützenkönig
- Aunt Frieda (1965) as Onkel Rudolf Waschkühn
- Sperrbezirk (1966) as Klipitzki
- Playgirl (1966) as Doktorchen
- Long Legs, Long Fingers (1966) as Inspektor
- Das Spukschloß im Salzkammergut (1966)
- Onkel Filser – Allerneueste Lausbubengeschichten (1966) as Professor Liebrecht Mutius
- Treibgut der Großstadt as (1967) Willi, Bargast
- The College Girl Murders (1967) as Sergeant Hanfield
- Love Nights in the Taiga (1967)
- Fast ein Held (1967) as Hauptmann
- When Night Falls on the Reeperbahn (1967) as Direktor Hanns Henningsen
- Die Lümmel von der ersten Bank, 1. Teil: Zur Hölle mit den Paukern (1968) as Dr. Knörz
- The Moment to Kill as Warren (1968)
- The Duck Rings at Half Past Seven (1968) as Prosecutor
- Die Lümmel von der ersten Bank, 2. Teil: Zum Teufel mit der Penne (1968) as Oberstudienrat Arthur Knörz
- Babeck (1968, TV miniseries) as Kriminalkommissar
- The Man with the Glass Eye (1969) as Nuthacher
- Der Kommissar – Season 1, Episode 5: "Ein Mädchen meldet sich nicht mehr" (1969, TV) as Karl Däubele
- Klassenkeile (1969) as Dr. Krapp-Krapproth
- Charley's Uncle (1969) as Dr. Bruhn
- Die Lümmel von der ersten Bank, 3. Teil: Pepe, der Paukerschreck (1969) as Dr. Arthur Knörz
- Heintje: A Heart Goes on a Journey (1969) as Rektor Neumann
- Naughty Roommates (1969) as Wolfram Kent
- Die Lümmel von der ersten Bank, 4. Teil: Hurra, die Schule brennt! (1969) as Studienrat Dr. Knörz
- Frau Wirtin bläst auch gern Trompete (1970) as Physikus
- Gentlemen in White Vests (1970) as Diplomingenieur Willy Stademann
- Heintje – Einmal wird die Sonne wieder scheinen (1970) as Lawyer Schiller
- Hotel by the Hour (1970) as Oskar Jennewein
- Hilfe, mich liebt eine Jungfrau (1970) as Dalfour
- Die Lümmel von der ersten Bank, 5. Teil: Wir hau’n die Pauker in die Pfanne (1970) as Studienrat Dr. Knörz
- What Is the Matter with Willi? (1970) as Fridolin
- Die fleißigen Bienen vom fröhlichen Bock (1970) as Lorenzen
- Die Feuerzangenbowle (1970) as Musiklehrer
- Frau Wirtin treibt es jetzt noch toller (1970)
- Musik, Musik – da wackelt die Penne (1970) as Onkel Emmanuel
- Twenty Girls and the Teachers (1971) as Onkel Theobald
- Aunt Trude from Buxtehude (1971) as Notary
- Wir hau’n den Hauswirt in die Pfanne (1971) as Dr. Möbius
- Die Lümmel von der ersten Bank, 6. Teil: Morgen fällt die Schule aus (1971) as Studienrat Dr. Knörz
- Our Willi Is the Best (1971) as Ottokar Mümmelmann
- Das ehrliche Interview (1971) as Theissen
- Jürgen Roland’s St. Pauli-Report (1971) as Onkel Troll
- Die Kompanie der Knallköppe (1971) as Dagobert von Kattnig
- Die Lümmel von der ersten Bank, 7. Teil: Betragen ungenügend! (1972) as Oberstudienrat Dr. Arthur Knörz
- Tatort: Kressin und der Mann mit dem gelben Koffer (1972, TV) as Kommissar Göbel
- The Red Queen Kills Seven Times (1972) as Tobias Wildenbrück
- Nya hyss av Emil i Lönneberga (1972) as Borgmästaren
- The Twins from Immenhof (1973) as Lehrer Zwilling
- The Exorcist (1973) as Karl Engstrom
- When Mother Went on Strike (1974) as Pastor Hans
- Magdalena – vom Teufel besessen (1974) as Father Conrad
- Karl May (1974) as Kreutzmann
- Derrick – Season 2, Episode 5: "Zeichen der Gewalt" (1975, TV) as Max Tolpe
- Der Stechlin (1975, TV miniseries) as Molchow
- Kings of the Road (1976) as Robert's Father
- Tatort: … und dann ist Zahltag (1976, TV) as Schürmann sen.
- Anita Drögemöller und die Ruhe an der Ruhr (1976) as Vondenbäumen
- Suspiria (1977) as Prof. Milius
- Scrounged Meals (1977) as Obdachloser
- Derrick – Season 4, Episode 4: "Offene Rechnung" (1997, TV) as Willi Nell
- Group Portrait with a Lady (1977) as Otto Hoyser
- The American Friend (1977) as Gantner
- The Expulsion from Paradise (1977) as Guest appearance
- Derrick – Season 5, Episode 3: "Abendfrieden" (1978, TV) as Waldemar Kreuzer
- Ein Mann will nach oben (1978, TV series) as Stoffhändler Felten
- Unternehmen Rentnerkommune (1978, TV series) as Hubertus Conradi
- The Man in the Rushes (1978) as Pfarrer
- Just a Gigolo (1978) as Oberst Gustav von Przygodski
- Flamme empor (1979 TV film)
- Derrick – Season 6, Episode 7: "Lena" (1979, TV) as Kunsthändler
- Aktion Abendsonne (1979, TV film)
- Cold Homeland (1979, TV film)
- The Old Fox – Season 3, Episode 11: "Eine große Familie" (1979, TV) as Dr. Pistralek
- Das verbotene Spiel (1979, TV series) as Der Älteste
- Un-Ruhestand – Episode 4: "Baldauf" (1980, TV)
- The Old Fox – Season 4, Episode 4: "Die tote Hand" (1980, TV) as Alois Bettler
- The Old Fox – Season 5, Episode 1: "Freispruch" (1981, TV) as Herr Berthold
- Sternensommer (1981, TV series) as Lodeweik
- Tatort: Der unsichtbare Gegner (1982, TV series) as Vater Henschel
- The Old Fox – Season 6, Episode 4: "Hass" (1082, TV) as Butler Georg
- The Old Fox – Season 6, Episode 9: "Ich werde dich töten" (1982, TV) as Walter Falk
- Das Traumschiff – Episode 10 (1983, TV) as Karl Krause
- The Sandman (1983m TV film)
- Rote Erde (1983, TV series) as Hermann Rewandowski
- Mabuse im Gedächtnis (1984, Short)
- Der Unsichtbare (1987) as Onkel Josef
- Ätherrausch (1987)
- The Nasty Girl (1990) as The archivist (final film role)
