= When Mother Went on Strike =

1974 film

- Directed by: Eberhard Schröder
- Written by: Franz Seitz
- Based on: Oh My Darling Daughter by Eric Malpass
- Produced by: Franz Seitz
- Starring: Peter Hall; Gila von Weitershausen; Belinda Mayne
- Cinematography: Wolfgang Treu
- Edited by: Adolf Schlyssleder
- Music by: Rolf A. Wilhelm
- Production companies: Franz Seitz Filmproduktion; Terra Film
- Distributed by: Constantin Film
- Release date: 7 February 1974
- Running time: 90 minutes
- Country: West Germany
- Language: German

When Mother Went on Strike (German: Als Mutter streikte) is a 1974 West German comedy film directed by Eberhard Schröder and starring Peter Hall, Gila von Weitershausen and Belinda Mayne.

It was based on the 1970 novel Oh My Darling Daughter by the British writer Eric Malpass.

== Cast ==
- Peter Hall as Dr. Harry Kemper
- Gila von Weitershausen as Gloria Perkin
- Belinda Mayne as Viola Kemper
- Hartmut Becker as Gabriel Gillhoff
- Gaby Dohm as Doris Bandel
- Siegfried Schürenberg as Onkel Walter Habinger
- Elisabeth Flickenschildt as Tante Clarissa Habinger
- Johanna Matz as Clementine Kemper
- Dominique Müller as Persephone 'Persi' Kemper
- Reiner Iwersen as Jochen Reitmoor
- Rolf Boysen as Verleger Hansen
- Tilo von Berlepsch
- Oliver Schündler as Nicky Kemper
- Rudolf Schündler as Pastor Hans

== Bibliography ==
- Bock, Hans-Michael & Bergfelder, Tim. The Concise CineGraph. Encyclopedia of German Cinema. Berghahn Books, 2009.
