= Heintje Simons =

Dutch schlager singer and actor (born 1955)

Heintje
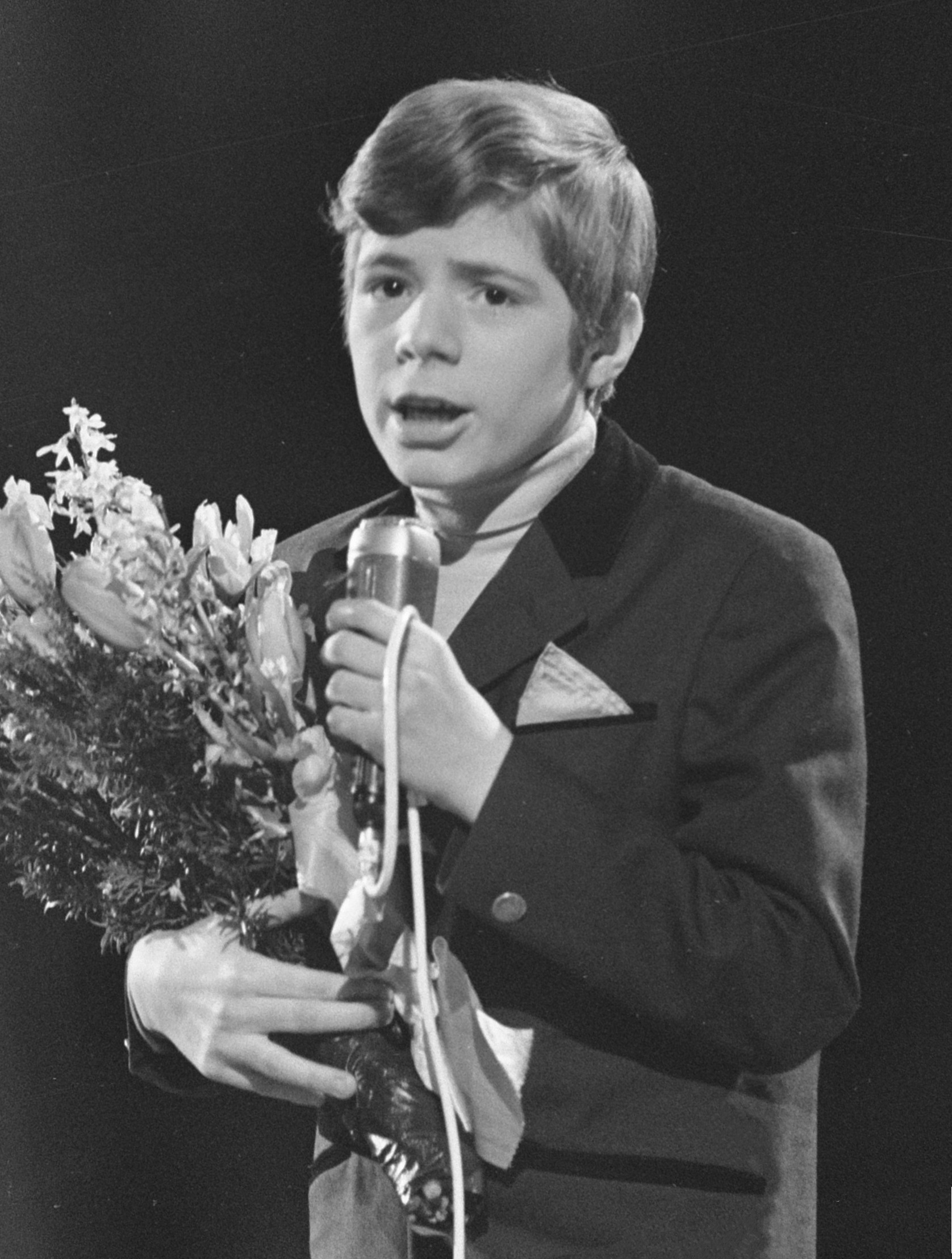
- Heintje in 1970

Background information
- Also known as: Heintje Simons, Hein Simons
- Born: Hendrik Nikolaas Theodoor Simons; 12 August 1955 (age 71); Heerlen, Netherlands
- Genres: Schlager
- Years active: 1967–present

Hendrik Nikolaas Theodoor "Heintje" Simons (born 12 August 1955) in Heerlen, later known as Hein Simons, is a Dutch schlager singer and actor.

== Background ==
Heintje was born the son of a coal miner who had to retire because of silicosis, reducing the family to near poverty. The family opened a small café where Heintje used to sing along with the jukebox. When he was 11, he entered a local singing contest. He beat 30 competitors to win the contest. Producer Addy Kleijngeld heard about him and went to audition him at his home. After hearing only a few notes, he took him on as a client and became his manager. Upon becoming wealthy, Heintje moved his family back to his father's birthplace, Neu-Moresnet, Kelmis, Liège, Belgium.

He became famous as a child singer, with hit song "Mama" (written by Cesare Andrea Bixio, Bruno Cherubini and Bruno Balz) in 1968, and as a child actor, with his appearances in numerous German films in the 1960s and 1970s (some of these were dubbed into English and also Afrikaans). He enjoyed success with English songs, notable of which is "I'm Your Little Boy". In 1971, The Los Angeles Times described him as "the hottest property in Europe." The same article quoted the Frankfurter Allgemeine Zeitung as saying of him "No one is bigger in German show business."

His 1967 recording of "Mama" sold over one million copies, and was awarded a gold record. The following year his debut album Heintje went on to sell over two million copies, resulting in a platinum record award. Other records selling over a million units included "Du sollst nicht weinen", "Heidschi bumbeidschi" and the seasonal album, Weihnachten mit Heintje. His sales in 1968 and 1969 alone totaled over 10 million.

At the age of 20 he also recorded in Afrikaans; his single "Jou hart is weer myne" reached number 4 on the South African Official Chart in 1975. He was so popular in South Africa that he performed in concert there in the mid 1970s; a 1983 appearance that he made at a concert for South African troops stationed in Namibia attracted negative publicity in his native Netherlands for violating that nation's cultural boycott of the South African apartheid system, leading to him being reprimanded by the United Nations and by Namibian pastor Zephania Kameeta, who called his performance "an immoral [show of] support for apartheid". In a subsequent interview, he brushed off the criticism, remarking that he was opposed to apartheid, but said, regarding his appearance in South Africa, that he was there as a singer and that it was not his business to get involved in politics. He told the Limburgsch Dagblad:

I am a singer and come to South Africa as an artist. I know that large Dutch companies still do fantastic business with this country. There can be no question of a real boycott. Why should I be the only victim? Besides, I love this country. The nature is incredibly beautiful and the people are very pleasant.

Heintje also gained great popularity in China in the 1980s. As China introduced its "Gaige Kaifang" policy, his 1970 film Heintje – Einmal wird die Sonne wieder scheinen was among the first wave of movies from the capitalist First World to be imported into China and made available to the general urban population. Heintje – Einmal wird die Sonne wieder scheinen, like most of other foreign films imported into China in the 1980s, received unprecedented popularity among Chinese viewers, with the majority of them having never encountered Western culture before under communist rule. His song "Kleine Kinder Kleine Sorgen" in the movie was so popular that it became an important part of an entire generation of Chinese 80s memory. On two occasions (2010 and 2015), Heintje was invited by Beijing Television as guest performer to sing "Kleine Kinder Kleine Sorgen" on BTV's Chinese New Year Gala.

Heintje continued to sing as an adult, billed as "Hein Simons", and is particularly popular in German-speaking countries. More than 40 million Heintje records have been sold worldwide. Since his marriage he has lived at Château Schimper in Moresnet, Plombières, Belgium. He was married from 1981 to 2014 and has three children.

In 2017 he re-launched his career with a CD and video Ich war Heintje performing duets with recordings of his younger self, and leading to a Christmas album Heintje und Ich.

In March 2024, he was diagnosed with melanoma, a form of skin cancer.

== Filmography ==
- 1967 Die Lümmel von der ersten Bank
- 1968 Zum Teufel mit der Penne
- 1969 Heintje – Ein Herz geht auf Reisen
- 1969 Hurra, die Schule brennt!
- 1970 Heintje – Einmal wird die Sonne wieder scheinen
- 1970 Heintje – Mein bester Freund
- 1971 Morgen fällt die Schule aus
