= We'll Take Care of the Teachers =

1970 film

- German film poster
- German: Wir haun die Pauker in die Pfanne
- Directed by: Harald Reinl
- Written by: Franz Seitz
- Produced by: Georg Föcking; Franz Seitz
- Starring: Uschi Glas; Hansi Kraus; Fritz Wepper
- Cinematography: Peter Reimer
- Edited by: Hermann Haller
- Music by: Rolf A. Wilhelm
- Production companies: Franz Seitz Filmproduktion; Terra-Filmkunst
- Distributed by: Constantin Film
- Release date: 8 July 1970
- Running time: 84 minutes
- Country: West Germany
- Language: German

We'll Take Care of the Teachers (German: Wir haun die Pauker in die Pfanne) is a 1970 West German comedy film directed by Harald Reinl and starring Uschi Glas, Hansi Kraus and Fritz Wepper. It was the fifth in a series of school-set films.

The film was shot at the Bavaria Studios in Munich and on location in Baden-Baden amongst other places.

== Cast ==
- Uschi Glas as Marion Nietnagel
- Hansi Kraus as Pepe Nietnagel
- Fritz Wepper as Hubert Böhm
- Rudolf Schündler as Studienrat Dr. Knörz
- Ruth Stephan as Dr. Pollhagen, student councilor
- Hans Terofal as Pedell Bloch
- Balduin Baas as Blaumeier, senior student councilor
- Karl Schönböck as Munk
- Doris Kiesow as Mrs. Taft
- Monika Dahlberg as Miss Weidt
- Kristina Nel as schoolgirl
- Jutta Speidel as schoolgirl
- Darko Popovtschak as pupil
- Peter Geigner
- Michael Riffelmacher
- Theo Lingen as Dr. Taft / Gotthold Emmanuel Taft
