= Here I Am, Here I Stay =

German musical comedy film

Here I Am, Here I Stay (Hier bin ich – hier bleib ich)
- The original film poster
- Directed by: Werner Jacobs
- Written by: Curth Flatow; Eckart Hachfeld, based on a play by Raymond Vincy and Jean Valmy
- Produced by: Artur Brauner
- Starring: Caterina Valente; Hans Holt
- Cinematography: Göran Strindberg
- Edited by: Jutta Hering
- Music by: Heinz Gietz
- Production company: CCC Film GmbH
- Distributed by: Constantin Film
- Release date: 1959
- Running time: 99 minutes
- Country: West Germany
- Language: German

Here I Am, Here I Stay (German: Hier bin ich – hier bleib ich) is a 1959 West German musical comedy film directed by Werner Jacobs and produced by Artur Brauner. It stars Caterina Valente, Hans Holt and Ruth Stephan. The film also features a guest appearance by Bill Haley.

== Plot ==
The singer Caterine, owner of a bar/night club in Paris, wants to marry her boyfriend Pierre. However, at the registrar's office she finds out that she is allegedly already married to one Baron Hubert von Löwenherz, owner of a castle. A former employee had stolen Caterine's documents and married the Baron under her assumed identity — before disappearing with the family jewels. Caterine travels to the Baron's castle, where a visit by his rich uncle forces the Baron to stage a life of married harmony with Caterine as his wife. Eventually, Caterine and the Baron fall for each other, whilst Pierre finds a new romance with the castle's cook.

== Cast ==
- Caterina Valente as Caterine
- Hans Holt as Baron Hubert von Löwenherz
- Ruth Stephan as Lucie
- Boy Gobert as Gustave
- Margarete Haagen as Baronin Appollonia von Löwenherz
- Paul Henckels as Baron Eduard von Löwenherz
- Ann Smyrner as Karin
- Wolfgang Müller as Pierre
- Wolfgang Neuss as Presenter
- Bill Haley & His Comets as Themselves

== Production ==
Hier bin ich - hier bleib ich was directed by Werner Jacobs and produced by Artur Brauner. The screenplay was written by Curth Flatow and Eckart Hachfeld, based on the play J'y suis, j'y reste by Raymond Vincy and Jean Valmy. An earlier French film of 1954 is also based on this play.

Filming took place from 16 October to 11 November 1958 in Bamberg and Schloss Seehof in Franconia, as well as at the Spandau Studios in Berlin. The line producer of the film was Horst Wendlandt. The film's sets were designed by the art directors Walter Kutz and Helmut Nentwig,

The film premiered at the Gloria-Palast in Stuttgart on 8 January 1959.

== Soundtrack ==
In the late 1980s Bear Family Records of Germany released a soundtrack album for the film, which was notable for including two of the three Bill Haley recordings which had been made exclusively for the movie (including "Vive la Rock and Roll" which featured the then-unprecedented duet between Haley and Caterina Valente, and "Hot Dog Buddy Buddy"). The third Haley recording made for the film, "Whoa Mabel", has not surfaced as of 2026 (like the other two it is not the same recording as released by Haley on Decca Records).
