= Helen Vita =

Swiss actress

Helen Vita (7 August 1928 in Hohenschwangau – 16 February 2001 in Berlin) was a Swiss chanson singer, actress, and comedian. In 1966 Vita recorded Freche Chansons aus dem alten Frankreich, traditional French chansons translated into German. The explicit content of the songs was under scrutiny by courts in Germany before the Protests of 1968. She was married to the composer Walter Baumgartner.

== Filmography ==
Film
Year	Title	Role	Notes
1947	Torrents	Léna	
1950	Der Geist von Allenwil	Marga Nock	
1952	Palace Hotel	Fräulein Lüthi, Telefonistin	
1953	They Call It Love	Helene, Zimmermädchen	
1954	Love and Trumpets		
1954	The Little Town Will Go to Sleep	Fräulein Lissy - eine 'Dame'	
1954	08/15	Lore Schulz	
1955	The Priest from Kirchfeld	Zenzi, Kelalnerin	
1955	08/15 – Part 2	Lore Schulz	
1955	The Happy Wanderer	Ida	
1955	Two Blue Eyes	Vera Seidemann	
1955	Urlaub auf Ehrenwort	Tänzerin Ilonka	
1955	08/15 at Home	Lore Schulz	
1956	Bonjour Kathrin	Denise	
1956	Dany, bitte schreiben Sie	Ossi Orla	
1956	Ein tolles Hotel	Lisette Moulin	
1956	Fruit in the Neighbour's Garden	Rita - 2.Dienstmädchen	
1956	S'Waisechind vo Engelberg	Jo	
1957	The Simple Girl	Eva Krapke	
1957	Bäckerei Zürrer	Sängerin - Partnerin von Herrn Berger	
1957	Egon, der Frauenheld		
1957	Doctor Bertram	Frau Sommerfeld	
1957	Kein Auskommen mit dem Einkommen!	Frau Bollmann	
1957	Ferien auf Immenhof	Fräulein Madler	
1958	Rosemary	Eveline	
1958	Heimatlos	Gertie	
1958	Black Forest Cherry Schnapps	Lorle	
1959	Liebe auf krummen Beinen	Pyjama-Dama	
1959	Everybody Loves Peter	Zita, Sylvias Schwester	
1959	Du bist wunderbar	Helen	
1961	Die Gejagten	Avine Dünki	
1961	Der Hochtourist	Wilma Dumar	
1961	Robert and Bertram	Mieze Frühling	
1963	Es war mir ein Vergnügen	Lotte Menzel-Schröder	
1964	Games of Desire		
1966	Kiss Kiss, Kill Kill	Bobo	Voice, Uncredited
1966	Honour Among Thieves	Olga	
1966	Spätere Heirat erwünscht	Lina	
1967	Treibgut der Großstadt	Lokal Gast	
1968	...und noch nicht sechzehn	Helen	
1969	Should a Schoolgirl Tell?	Narrator	Voice
1969	The Sweet Pussycats	Mme Peronnière	
1970	What Is the Matter with Willi?	Frau Stirnima	
1970	Die Feuerzangenbowle	Frau Windscheid	
1971	Der neue heiße Sex-Report – Was Männer nicht für möglich halten	Frau Tönnisen	
1971	Holiday Report	Gitta Mitterer	
1971	St. Pauli Report	Hanni	
1972	Cabaret	Fraulein Kost	
1973	Dream City	Princess	
1976	Satan's Brew	Luise Kranz	
1979	It Can Only Get Worse	Frau von Hagen	
1981	Lili Marleen	Grete	
1984	Knock on the Wrong Door		
1989	Gekauftes Glück	Ehevermittlerin	
1992	Happy Birthday, Turk!	Frau Löff	
1997	Babes' Petrol	Tante Margot	

TV
Year	Title	Role	Notes
1980	Berlin Alexanderplatz	Fränze	
