= Günther Schramm =

German film and television actor (born 1929)

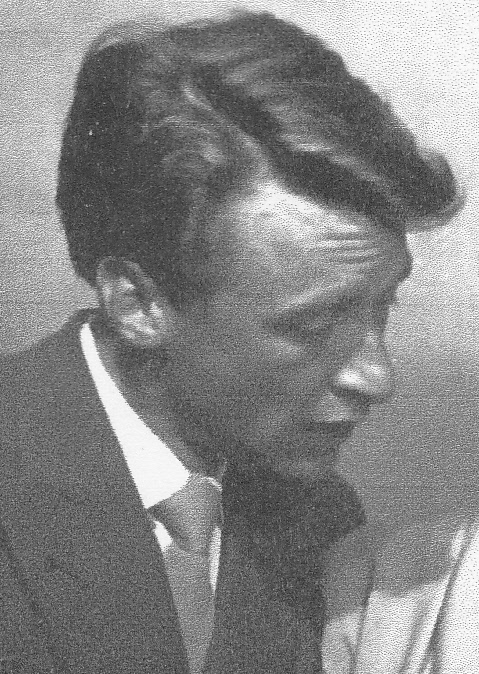
- Born: 18 February 1929 (age 97); Potsdam, Germany
- Occupation: Actor
- Years active: 1955–present

Günther Schramm (born 18 February 1929) is a German film and television actor. In 1958 he married the actress Gudrun Thielemann.

== Selected filmography ==
- The Ambassador (1960)
- The Happy Years of the Thorwalds (1962)
- Snow White and the Seven Jugglers (1962)
- Zur Hölle mit den Paukern (1968)
- Death and Diamonds (1968)
- The Heath Is Green (1972)
- Holstein Lovers (1999, TV film)

== Television appearances ==
- Der Kommissar
- Das Traumschiff
