= Willi Manages the Whole Thing =

- Directed by: Werner Jacobs
- Written by: Franz Seitz (play); Rolf Ulrich; Reinhold Brandes
- Produced by: Preben Philipsen; Horst Wendlandt
- Starring: Heinz Erhardt; Erika von Thellmann; Hannelore Elsner
- Cinematography: Karl Löb
- Edited by: Alfred Srp
- Music by: Martin Böttcher
- Production company: Rialto Film
- Distributed by: Constantin Film
- Release date: 24 February 1972
- Running time: 84 minutes
- Country: West Germany
- Language: German

Willi Manages the Whole Thing (German: Willi wird das Kind schon schaukeln) is a 1972 German sports comedy film directed by Werner Jacobs and starring Heinz Erhardt, Erika von Thellmann and Hannelore Elsner. German footballer Uwe Seeler appears as himself. It was the final entry into a four film series with Heinz Erhardt as Willi. It was shot at the Bavaria Studios in Munich with location shooting taking place in West Berlin.

== Synopsis ==
Willi takes over as manager of a provincial football team.

== Cast ==
- Heinz Erhardt as Willi Kuckuck
- Erika von Thellmann as Tante Elvira
- Hannelore Elsner as Constanze
- Ernst H. Hilbich as Schnecke
- Barbara Schöne as Betty
- Gernot Endemann as Julius Appel
- Claudia Butenuth as Agnes
- Stefan Behrens as Mickey
- Loni Heuser as Cosima Schulze
- Balduin Baas as Wolfgang Amadeus Wirsing
- Gesine Hess as Reinhilde
- Reiner Brönneke as Turnegger
- Hans Terofal as Stefan Wimblinger
- Reinhold Brandes as Max Hauer
- Henning Schlüter as Butenbrink
- Uwe Seeler as himself
