= Balduin Baas =

German actor (1922–2006)

- Born: 9 June 1922; Free City of Danzig
- Died: 22 May 2006 (aged 83); Hamburg, Germany
- Occupation: Actor
- Years active: 1956–2002

Balduin Baas (9 June 1922 – 22 May 2006) was a German actor. He appeared in more than 70 films and television shows between 1956 and 2002.

== Partial filmography ==
- The Captain from Köpenick (1956) - Ostpreußischer Grenadier
- Skandal um Dr. Vlimmen (1956) - Knecht Tiest
- Three Birch Trees on the Heath (1956) - Plaskude
- Die verpfuschte Hochzeitsnacht (1957) - Schaffner / Conductor
- Tired Theodore (1957) - Hoteldiener Anton
- The Man Who Couldn't Say No (1958)
- The Rest Is Silence (1959) - Sekretär Werner Osfried
- Gauner-Serenade (1960) - Bambino
- Eine hübscher als die andere (1961) - Karusellbetreiber (uncredited)
- Murder Party (1961) - Diener Arthur
- The Liar (1961) - Wiedemayer
- Genosse Münchhausen (1962) - Herr Biese
- Tales of a Young Scamp (1964) - Privatlehrer
- DM-Killer (1965) - Parson Behrendt
- The Gentlemen (1965) - Meyberg
- Who Wants to Sleep? (1965)
- The Fountain of Love (1966) - Druggist
- I Am Looking for a Man (1966) - Artist Pauli
- Once a Greek (1966) - Auguste
- Das Rasthaus der grausamen Puppen (1967) - Lupus McIntosh
- Zur Hölle mit den Paukern (1968) - Dr. Blaumeier
- The Duck Rings at Half Past Seven (1968) - Lesender
- Zum Teufel mit der Penne (1968) - Studienrat Blaumeier
- Slap in the Face (1970) - Vize
- We'll Take Care of the Teachers (1970) - Oberstudienrat Blaumeier
- Twenty Girls and the Teachers (1971)
- Morgen fällt die Schule aus (1971) - Oberstudienrat Blaumeier
- Willi Manages the Whole Thing (1972) - Wolfgang Amadeus Wirsing
- Betragen ungenügend! (1972) - Blaumeier
- Hauptsache Ferien (1972) - Lehrer Brummer
- Wer einmal in das Posthorn stößt (1973) - Dr. Windgassen
- To the Bitter End (1975) - Fogosch
- Orchestra Rehearsal (1978) - Conductor
- The Magic Mountain (1982) - Zeichenlehrer
- Doctor Faustus (1982)
- Frevel (1983) - Dürkheimer
- Derrick (1984–1986, TV Series) - Frank
- La Femme fardée (1990) - Kreuzer
- Pappa Ante Portas (1991) - Geburtstagsgesellschaft: Musiklehrer
- Candy (1998)
