= Belinda Mayne =

British actress (active 1974– )

- Born: Belinda L. Mayne; London, England
- Occupation: Actress
- Years active: 1974–present
- Notable work: Doctor Who (1987)
- Father: Ferdy Mayne

Belinda Mayne is a British actress who has appeared in film, television and theatre in Germany, the UK, and the US since 1974 when she made her first appearance in Strangers.

== Partial filmography ==
- When Mother Went on Strike (1974) - Viola Kemper
- Die Ameisen kommen (1974) - Marlene
- Silence in the Forest (1976) - Lori Petre
- A Man Called Intrepid (1979) - Deirdra (miniseries)
- Alien 2: On Earth (1980) - Thelma Joyce
- Flashpoint Africa (1980) - Ann Barraclough
- Nightkill (1980) - Christine
- Goliath Awaits (1981) - Sally Crane
- Solo (1982) - Rosie (3 episodes)
- Krull (1983) - Vella
- Lassiter (1984) - Helen Boardman
- White Fire (1984) - Ingrid Donnelly
- Don't Open till Christmas (1984) - Kate
- Fatal Beauty (1987) - Traci
- Doctor Who: serial Delta and the Bannermen (1987) - Delta (3 episodes)
- To Be the Best (1991) - Jill (1 episode)
- The Tigress (1992) - Elsy
- Riders (1993) - Lavinia Greenslade (TV movie)
- Wonder Woman 1984 (2020) - Stagg's Secretary
