= Our Willi Is the Best =

1971 film

- Directed by: Werner Jacobs
- Written by: Rolf Ulrich; Reinhold Brandes
- Produced by: Herbert Kerz; Horst Wendlandt
- Starring: Heinz Erhardt; Ruth Stephan; Rudolf Schündler
- Cinematography: Karl Löb
- Edited by: Alfred Srp
- Music by: Peter Thomas
- Production company: Rialto Film
- Distributed by: Constantin Film
- Release date: 3 September 1971
- Running time: 86 minutes
- Country: West Germany
- Language: German

Our Willi Is the Best (German: Unser Willi ist der Beste) is a 1971 German comedy film directed by Werner Jacobs and starring Heinz Erhardt, Ruth Stephan and Rudolf Schündler. Is the third part of the 'Willi' series of films.

== Synopsis ==
Now retired from his civil service job, Willi becomes a door-to-door salesman.

== Cast ==
- Heinz Erhardt as Willi Winzig
- Ruth Stephan as Heidelinde Hansen
- Rudolf Schündler as Ottokar Mümmelmann
- Elsa Wagner as Alte Dame
- Paul Esser as Herr Kaiser
- Jutta Speidel as Biggi Hansen
- Henry Vahl as Opa Hansen
- Martin Hirthe as Hauswirt Graumann
- Edith Hancke as Elsetraut Knöpfke
- Hans Terofal as Emil Klingelberg
- Martin Jente as Butler Edu
- Wolfgang Völz as Rolls-Royce Chauffeur
