= Three Days Confined to Barracks (1955 film) =

1955 film directed by Georg Jacoby

- German film poster
- German: Drei Tage Mittelarrest
- Directed by: Georg Jacoby
- Written by: Bobby E. Lüthge (screenplay 1930); Károly Nóti (screenplay 1930); Georg Jacoby; Klaus Günther Neumann
- Produced by: Franz Tappers
- Starring: Ernst Waldow; Grethe Weiser; Eva Probst
- Cinematography: Erich Claunigk
- Edited by: Martha Dübber
- Music by: Michael Jary
- Production company: Standard-Filmverleih
- Distributed by: Deutsche London-Film
- Release date: 9 September 1955
- Running time: 95 minutes
- Country: West Germany
- Language: German

Three Days Confined to Barracks (German: Drei Tage Mittelarrest) is a 1955 West German comedy film directed by Georg Jacoby and starring Ernst Waldow, Grethe Weiser and Eva Probst. It was shot at the Wandsbek Studios in Hamburg. The film's sets were designed by Erich Kettelhut and Johannes Ott. It is a remake of the 1930 comedy film Three Days Confined to Barracks. Like its predecessor it is a comic portrayal of life in the German Army at the beginning of the century.

== Cast ==
- Ernst Waldow as Bürgemeister
- Grethe Weiser as Klara
- Eva Probst as Grete
- Ruth Stephan as Auguste
- Elfie Pertramer as Dienstmädchen Frieda
- Ilse Petri as Dienstmädchen Bertha
- Maria Litto as Laja Patacki Tänzerin
- Willy Fritsch as Major von Faber
- Erwin Strahl as Oberleutnant von Feldern
- Willi Rose as Feldwebel Krause
- Walter Müller as Musketier Max Plettke
- Franz Muxeneder as Musketier Franz Nowalski
- Klaus Günther Neumann as Musketier Mielke
- Charles Palent as Musketier Junigkeit
- Günther Jerschke as Musketier Sanftmut
- Joachim Teege as Standesamtdiener Storch
- Heinz Erhardt as Schreiber Zippert
- Manfred Steffen as Adjudant
