= Zum Stanglwirt =

- Country of origin: Germany

Zum Stanglwirt is a German television series that ran from 1993-1997 starring Peter Steiner, Erma Wassmer and Gerda Steiner.

== See also ==
- List of German television series
