= Werner Jacobs =

German film director and editor (1909–1999)

- Born: 24 April 1909; Berlin; Germany
- Died: 24 January 1999 (aged 89); Munich, Bavaria; Germany
- Occupations: Director, editor
- Years active: 1950 - 1975

Werner Jacobs (1909–1999) was a German film director and editor. He was born in Berlin on the 24 April 1909. He is best known for his contributions to Modebummel (1951), Der Stern von Santa Clara (1958) and André und Ursula (1955).

== Selected filmography ==
- The Fire Devil (1940, editor)
- Comrades (1941, editor)
- The Girl from Fano (1941, editor)
- Tonelli (1943, editor)
- Night of the Twelve (1949, editor)
- The Blue Straw Hat (1949, editor)
- The Blue and White Lion (1952)
- Arlette Conquers Paris (1953)
- Street Serenade (1953)
- Guitars of Love (1954)
- André and Ursula (1955)
- San Salvatore (1956)
- Santa Lucia (1956)
- The Beggar Student (1956)
- The Simple Girl (1957)
- The Count of Luxemburg (1957)
- Munchhausen in Africa (1958)
- The Star of Santa Clara (1958)
- Here I Am, Here I Stay (1959)
- A Summer You Will Never Forget (1959)
- Conny and Peter Make Music (1960)
- Bombs on Monte Carlo (1960, writer)
- The White Horse Inn (1960)
- Mariandl (1961)
- Mariandls Homecoming (1962)
- The Merry Widow (1962)
- The Model Boy (1963)
- Homesick for St. Pauli (1963)
- Heidi (1965)
- Aunt Frieda (1965)
- In Bed by Eight (1965)
- The Sinful Village (1966)
- Murderers Club of Brooklyn (1967)
- When Ludwig Goes on Manoeuvres (1967)
- Zur Hölle mit den Paukern (1968)
- Zum Teufel mit der Penne (1968)
- Hurra, die Schule brennt! (1969)
- Charley's Uncle (1969)
- What Is the Matter with Willi? (1970)
- Our Willi Is the Best (1971)
- Willi Manages The Whole Thing (1972)
- My Daughter, Your Daughter (1972)
- Old Barge, Young Love (1973)
- The Flying Classroom (1973)
- Zwei himmlische Dickschädel (1974)
- Auch ich war nur ein mittelmäßiger Schüler (1974)
- Schwarzwaldfahrt aus Liebeskummer (1974)
