= Studienrat =

External media
- Title Studienrat in History

Images
- Historic Studienrat at Erfurt 1929
- Studienrat 1979 at Berlin
- Studienrat i.R.

Video
- Helge Schneider as Studienrat Major, YouTube video

Studienrat (abbreviated StR) is an official title/rank of higher teachers in the German and Austrian education system. Even though the German and Austrian education systems use the same term, there are differences in the level and usage of this rank.

== Austria ==
In Austria, Studienrat is an honorary title awarded to people in the field of education.

== Germany ==
In the German education system, Studienrat is an official title and rank for tenured higher teachers at secondary schools (Gymnasium), tenured higher scientific teachers at vocational schools, technical colleges and further education colleges (Berufsschule, Berufskolleg, Fachschule) teaching at least till Bachelor's level and for Senior lecturers and Assistant professors at universities. Higher scientific teachers at Germany must hold facultas docendis in at least two different subjects.

=== Form of address ===
In Germany, a holder of the title/rank Studienrat (StR) is typically addressed by his title/rank followed by his other degrees in the same way as a holder of the title/rank of professor is addressed, for instance: "Herr Studienrat Dr. Schmidt" (or abbreviated: "StR Dr. Schmidt").

=== Salary and rank ===
Like police officers, politicians, judges, members of the administration or military a Studienrat is part of the same salary and ranking system. The rank in the German Beamte System for a Studienrat is A13 which is equivalent to the rank of a Major (Germany) in the German military called Bundeswehr.

The rank of Studienrat is comparable in salary and level to that of a German junior professor (similar to an assistant professor) and is equal in rank to an Akademischer Rat. The title and rank of Dozent (docent) which was formerly used for the official title and rank below professor was replaced by the ranks of Studienrat and Oberstudienrat by the legislative change of 25 October 1963.

=== Requirements ===
Prerequisite for this title/rank is at least the "First State Examination for Teachers" called Staatsexamen (equivalent to Master of Education - EQF-Level 7) called "Erste Staatspruefung fuer Lehramt an Gymnasium" (secondary schools) or "Erste Staatspruefung fuer Lehramt an beruflichen Schulen" (vocational schools/further education colleges) and the "Second State Examination for Teachers" (Master-level + 2 years of intense teacher training). The degree of Master of Education, which was established 2005 under the Bologna Process is accepted as equal to the "First State Examination for Teachers"(1. Staatsexamen) and allows entrance to the second phase of the German teacher education called Referendariat or Vorbereitungsdienst.

The "First State Examination" takes at least 4.5–5 years of studies and finishes with a thesis, a viva voce examination and several written and oral tests.

Graduates of the "Second State Examination for Teachers" receive the teaching license in at least two subjects and the professional title/degree "Lehrer mit Lehramt fuer..." which stands for "Teacher with teaching license for secondary schools" or "Teacher with teaching license for vocational schools".

Only after passing the "First State Examination" and the "Second State Examination" are German teachers fully qualified. The duration of complete German teacher education is about 7 years of higher education (Master-level + 2 years of postgraduate studies).

Applicants for "State Examination" studies are required to have the German General University Entrance Qualification called Allgemeine Hochschulreife or in other words called Abitur.

For teachers working at universities, the "Second State Examination for Teachers" may be replaced by a doctorate.

Holders of a Magister degree (Master) and a doctorate can be accepted under some circumstances (extensive amount of published work) for the title/rank of Studienrat, too.

The "Second State Examination for Teachers" takes 2 years training at a special teacher academy called Studienseminar. The workload of this so-called Referendariat or Vorbereitungsdienst is 3600 hours (comparable to ~120 ECTS) consisting of at least 1080 hours course work in 12 modules with oral and written tests at the teacher academy, teaching in the two studied subjects in different schools and a thesis in the field of education. In some cases, the second Staatsexamen can be a substitute for a doctorate when it comes to applying for certain jobs at a university (i.e., Akademischer Rat).

=== Appointment and granting of title ===
The title/rank of Studienrat can be awarded only by the government of one of the states of Germany, for example the state of Hesse. Granting this title/rank makes the holder a Beamter (civil servant having tenure), employed by the German government.

First, the title/rank Studienrat z.A. or Studienrat zur Anstellung is granted for a probation period. After at least three years of probation time and many additional examinations the title/rank Studienrat auf Lebenszeit can be granted by the government giving tenure for lifetime (Beamter auf Lebenszeit).

=== Notable holders of title ===
For instance the German politician and Lord Mayor of the city of Marburg Hanno Drechsler, the German mathematician Heinrich Jung, and Gebhard Ludwig Himmler, the elder brother of the Reichsführer-SS Heinrich Himmler all had the title of Studienrat.

== See also ==
- Academic ranks in Germany
