= Vater sein dagegen sehr =

1957 film

- Directed by: Kurt Meisel
- Written by: Horst Biernath (novel); Gustav Kampendonk (adaptation); Hans Jacoby
- Produced by: Karl Mitschke (executive producer); Kurt Ulrich (producer); Heinz Willeg (executive producer)
- Starring: See below
- Cinematography: Kurt Hasse
- Edited by: Wolfgang Wehrum
- Music by: Michael Jary
- Release date: 1957
- Running time: 95 minutes
- Country: West Germany
- Language: German

Vater sein dagegen sehr (English: "Being a father however, is hard") is a 1957 West German film directed by Kurt Meisel.

== Plot summary ==
One day, writer Lutz Ventura receives news that his sister has died. She leaves behind two children, whom he temporarily takes in after the funeral because Frau Roeckel, the sister of the children's father, deceased five years earlier, is taking a holiday with her husband.

Lutz and the children become good friends. The children want to stay with their uncle, but he does not have much room in his tower apartment, has little money, and wants to get married soon.

The children must return to the Roeckel family, but they run away, because there is always trouble there. The soft-hearted uncle takes them in, but his fiancée has definite ideas about their future, and they don't include other people's children. On the spur of the moment, she tells him that she no longer wants to marry him.

The writer gets in trouble with the authorities; the children are not allowed to live with him since he is an unmarried man. The situation escalates as the child welfare authorities require the niece and nephew to be ready for transfer to an orphanage that evening. Lutz goes to the parish priest and explains to him his new idea to seek sanctuary in order to make the public aware of his problem. The priest rejects this but secretly talks to Margot, Lutz's fiancé. She tells the priest that she had been waiting for an opportunity to change her mind and the couple is married on the same day.

== Location ==
The film was shot in rural Franconia, among other locations. The tower is part of the city wall in Sommerhausen. Ventura's marriage took place in the Würzburg Adalberokirche. Cities like Würzburg, Ochsenfurt or Marktbreit pop up in the film repeatedly.

== Reception ==
Sentimental entertainment, tailored to the lead actor Heinz Rühmann, who gives the superficial material some depth.

– Encyclopedia of the International film

An unrealistic and shallow entertainment movie; the in and of itself sympathetic performance of the lead actor Heinz Rühmann can not provide the missing weight.

– Protestant film observers [2]

== Cast ==
- Heinz Rühmann as Lutz Ventura
- Marianne Koch as Margot Ventura geb. Sonnemann
- Hans Leibelt as Pfarrer Miesbach
- Paul Esser as Friedrich Roeckel
- Edith Schollwer as Ottilie Roeckel geb. Lüdecke
- Agnes Windeck as Fürsorgerin
- Hans Waldemar Anders as Schulvorsteher
- Luigi Malipiero as Briefträger
- Franz-Otto Krüger as Standesbeamter
- Kurt Meisel as Schneider
- Maren Bielenberg as Gertrud "Traudl" Lüdecke
- Rolf Pinegger as Rudi Lüdecke (boy)
