= Germaine Damar =

Luxembourgish actress

- Damar in 1959
- Born: Germaine Haeck; 31 August 1929 (age 97); Petingen, Luxembourg
- Other name: Ria Poncelet
- Occupations: Actress, dancer
- Years active: 1941–1964
- Spouse: Roman G. Toporow (died 1993)
- Children: 1

Germaine Haeck (born 31 August 1929), known professionally as Germaine Damar, is a Luxembourgish actress and dancer. She started her career as an acrobat and played in nearly 30 German films, including three films in which she was the partner of Peter Alexander.

== Early life ==
Damar was born as Germaine Haeck in Pétange. She was the third of four daughters of metallurgical worker Dominique Haeck and his wife Barbara Poncelet. At the gymnastics club of Nidderkuer (Niederkorn) in Luxembourg, the 5-year-old Damar laid the foundations for her future career. With her sister Geny and two gym teachers she formed the acrobatic quartet Los Habaneros.

On 10 May 1940, after the invasion of Luxembourg by the German troops, she fled with her parents and siblings to Paris. There, the 12-year-old continued to develop her talents and she performed with her sister Geny and her former gym teacher Atilio Bariviera as Trio Deluxe at the Alhambra and the Bobino. She also took dance classes and was trained in acting and ballet.

== Career ==
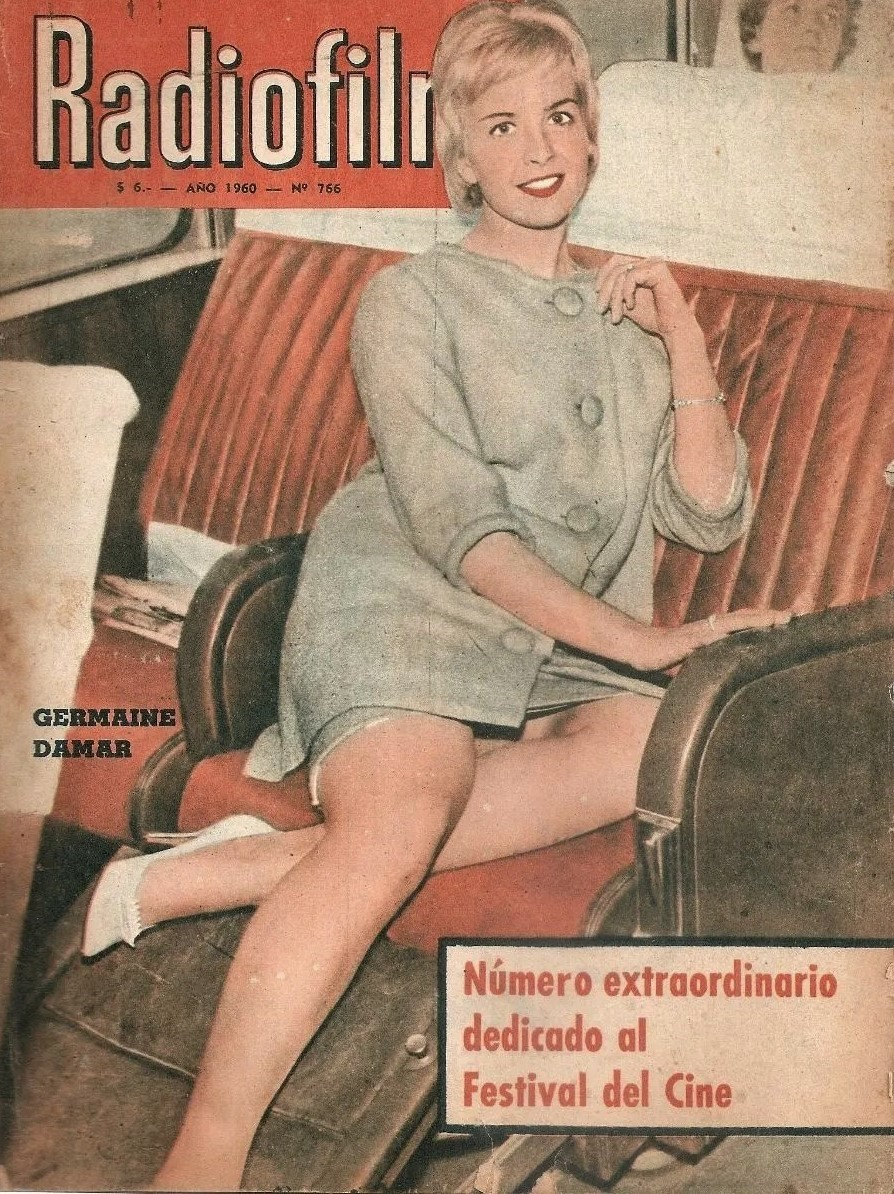
Damar on the cover of Argentinian magazine Radiofilm, 1960

After World War II, she started a solo career and toured through Europe. She travelled to North Africa and the Orient to perform there with her sister Sylvie and Sylvie's husband as Trio Vialine. In Cairo, they even performed for King Farouk. She used as her stage name Ria Poncelet. In Cairo she also met the actress Zarah Leander, who mediated a screen-test for her in Hamburg in 1952 for Herzog Film. Although director Robert A. Stemmle was not satisfied with the test, she soon landed her first film role. Director Géza von Cziffra sought a talented dancer to replace the ill Maria Litto in his revue film Tanzende Sterne (1952). He watched the screen-test and gave her the lead part opposite Georg Thomalla. She changed her name from Germaine Haeck into Germaine Damar and the press concluded for some time that she was a French dancer.

Tanzende Sterne (Dancing Stars, 1952) became Damar's breakthrough. Herzog Filmverleih offered her a 5-year contract and she went on to play in a total of 28 films. She appeared in such light entertainment fare as Südliche Nächte (1953), Die Drei von der Tankstelle (1955), and Symphonie in Gold (1956) opposite Joachim Fuchsberger. Her best known musical was Die Beine von Dolores (1957) with Claus Biederstaedt. In France she made the western musical Sérénade au Texas (1958) with Bourvil and Luis Mariano.

In three films she was the partner of Peter Alexander. These were the comedies So ein Millionär hat's schwer (1958), Peter schießt den Vogel ab (1959) and Salem Aleikum (1959). In the early 1960s Damar made two films in Spain, the comedies Cariño mío (1961) and Escala en Hi-Fi (1963). Her film Die Beine von Dolores was such a big hit in Argentina, that Damar moved for three years to South America. There she became a popular star with her own TV show. In Germany, Damar had dated with actor Georg Thomalla and producer Andreas C. Schuller, who had ruined her with his flop Glück und Liebe in Monaco (1959).

== Later years ==
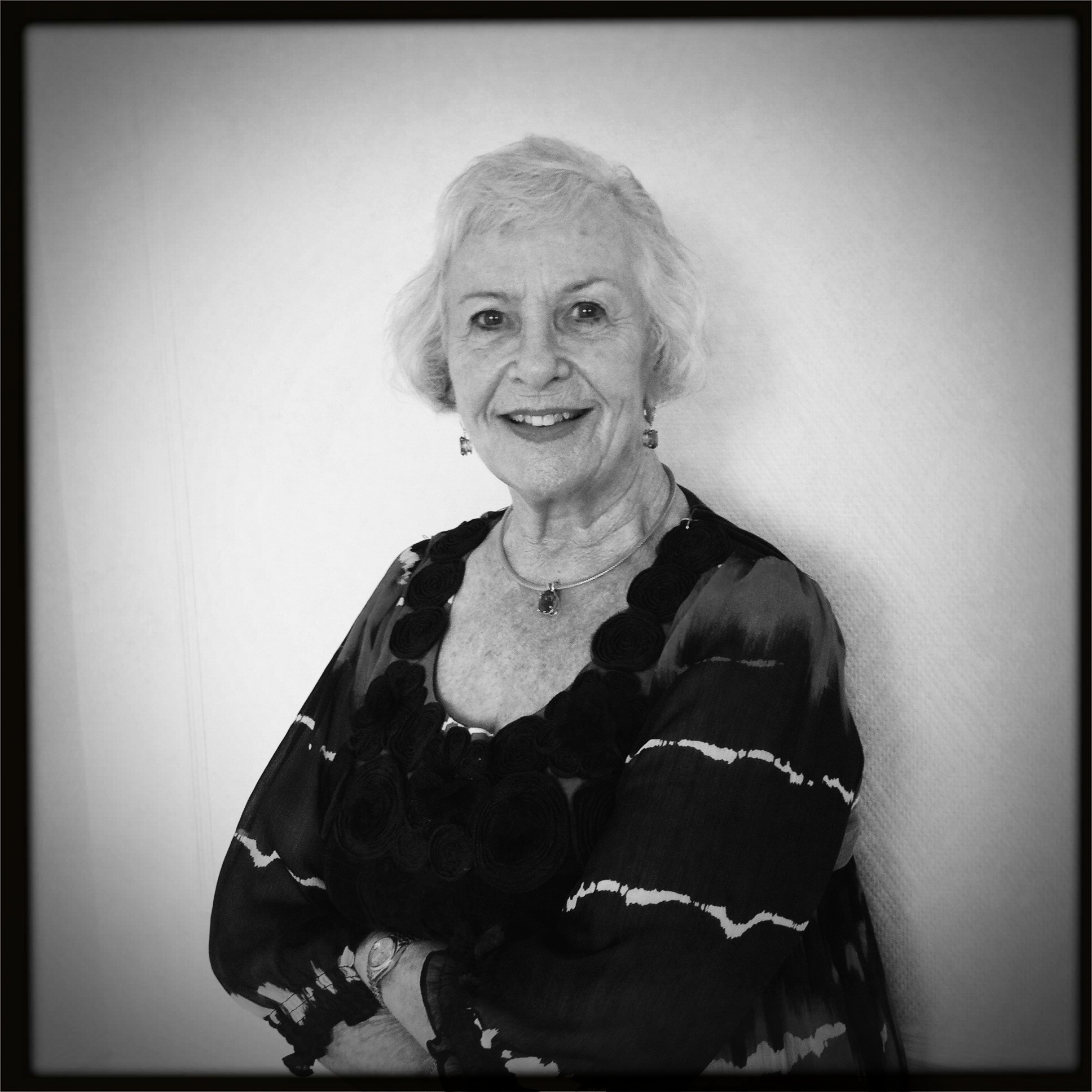
Damar in 2011

In Argentina, she met the American manager Roman G. Toporow and married him. In 1964, Damar retired and two years later her son Roman Martin Toporow was born. Her husband died in 1993, and Damar has since then lived with her son in Fort Lauderdale, Florida.

In June 2011 the documentary Germaine Damar – Der tanzende Stern (Germaine Damar, the dancing star) by Michael Wenk was presented at the Luxembourg cinema Ciné Utopia. The former dancing star herself was present and even sang one of her old songs. The audience gave her a standing ovation.

== Selected filmography ==
- Tanzende Sterne (1952)
- Southern Nights (1953)
- Hit Parade (1953)
- Ten on Every Finger (1954)
- Request Concert (1955)
- The Three from the Filling Station (1955)
- The Count of Luxemburg (1957)
- The Legs of Dolores (1957)
- Tabarin (1958)
- Bimbo the Great (1958)
- Serenade of Texas (1958)
- So ein Millionär hat's schwer (1958)
- Peter Shoots Down the Bird (1959)
- A Thousand Stars Aglitter (1959)
- Gauner-Serenade (1960)
- Darling (1961)
- Germaine Damar – Der tanzende Stern (Documentary, 2011)

== Bibliography ==
- Thill, Viviane / Lesch, Paul. Germaine Damar: Ein Luxemburger Star im deutschen Film der 50er Jahre. Centre nationale de l'audiovisuel, Dudelange 1995.
- Mathijs, Ernest. The Cinema of the Low Countries. Wallflower Press, 2004.
