= When the Heath Is in Bloom =

1960 film

- Directed by: Hans Deppe
- Written by: Gustav Kampendonk; Hermann Löns
- Produced by: Kurt Ulrich; Heinz Willeg
- Starring: Joachim Hansen; Walter Richter; Peter Carsten
- Cinematography: Hannes Fuchs; Willi Sohm
- Edited by: Wolfgang Wehrum
- Music by: Raimund Rosenberger
- Production company: Kurt Ulrich Filmproduktion
- Distributed by: Deutsche Film Hansa
- Release date: 21 October 1960
- Running time: 93 minutes
- Country: West Germany
- Language: German

When the Heath Is in Bloom (German: Wenn die Heide blüht) is a 1960 West German drama film directed by Hans Deppe and starring Joachim Hansen, Walter Richter, and Peter Carsten. It is loosely based on stories by Hermann Löns.

The film's art direction was by Willi Herrmann. It was shot at the Bendestorf Studios near Hamburg and on location on Lüneburg Heath.

== Cast ==
- Joachim Hansen as Rolf
- Walter Richter as Jochen Petersen
- Peter Carsten as Klaus
- Veronika Bayer as Anne
- Heinz Engelmann as Förster Harkort
- Rita Paul as Vera, Singer
- Rainer Brandt as Harms Brockdorf
- Gardy Granass as Sonja
- Ludwig Linkmann as Heidebewohner
- Josef Sieber as Dirk
- Rudolf Platte as Lemcke
- Willy Fritsch as Dr. Erdman
- Ernst Stankovski as Karl
- Wolfgang Wahl as Anton
- Peer Schmidt as Hein
- Hans Richter as Musician Peter
- Heidi Kabel as Wirtschafterin

== Bibliography ==
- Davidson, John; Hake, Sabine (2009). Framing the Fifties: Cinema in a Divided Germany. New York: Berghahn Books. ISBN 978-1-84545-536-1.
