= Hit Parade (film) =

1953 film directed by Erik Ode

- Directed by: Erik Ode
- Written by: Hans Fritz Köllner; Aldo von Pinelli
- Produced by: Heinz-Joachim Ewert
- Starring: Germaine Damar; Walter Giller; Nadja Tiller
- Cinematography: Richard Angst
- Edited by: Hermann Leitner; Wolfgang Wehrum
- Music by: Fred Freed; Heino Gaze; Michael Jary; Peter Kreuder
- Production companies: Herzog Film; Melodie Film
- Distributed by: Herzog Film
- Release date: 3 November 1953
- Running time: 100 minutes
- Country: West Germany
- Language: German

Hit Parade (German: Schlagerparade) is a 1953 West German musical comedy film directed by Erik Ode and starring Germaine Damar, Walter Giller and Nadja Tiller. It was shot at the Spandau Studios in West Berlin. The film's sets were designed by the art directors Kurt Herlth and Karl Weber.

== Cast ==
- Germaine Damar as Barbara Blanc
- Walter Giller as Walter Lorenz
- Karl Schönböck as Fred Pauli
- Nadja Tiller as Sherry Sommer
- Loni Heuser as Frau Gabler
- Renate Danz as Angelika Gabler
- Walter Gross as Otto Bonnhoff
- Bully Buhlan as Max Balduweit
- Alexander Engel as Prof. Hochstätter
- Willi Schaeffers as Direktor Wallner
- Harald Juhnke as Bob
- Otto Kruger as Remer
- Ruth Stephan
- Victor Janson
- Die Syprys as Singers
- Wolfgang Jansen as Willie
- Margot Hielscher as Singer
- Johannes Heesters as Singer
- Lys Assia as Singer
- Gitta Lind as Singer
- Renate Holm as Singer
- Rudi Schuricke as Singer
- Rita Paul as Singer
- Friedel Hensch as Singer
- Sunshine Quartett as Singers
- Das Cornell-Trio as Singers
- The Schöneberger Sängerknaben as Singers
- Maurice Chevalier as himself - Singer
- Michael Jary as himself, musician
- Peter Igelhoff as himself, musician
- Peter Kreuder as himself, musician
- Friedrich Schröder as himself, musician
- Fred Freed as himself, musician
- Stan Kenton as himself, and his Orchestra
- Barnabás von Géczy as himself & his soloists
- Werner Müller as & his Rias Tanzorchester
- Raisner as Mundharmonika-Solisten
- Macky Kaspar as und seine Trompete

== Bibliography ==
- Bock, Hans-Michael; Bergfelder, Tim, eds. (2009). The Concise Cinegraph: Encyclopaedia of German Cinema. Berghahn Books. ISBN 978-1-57181-655-9.
