= Homesick for You =

1952 film directed by Robert A. Stemmle

- Directed by: Robert A. Stemmle
- Written by: Guenther Schwenn; Robert A. Stemmle; Aldo von Pinelli
- Produced by: Herbert Uhlich
- Starring: Margot Hielscher; Peter Pasetti; Josefin Kipper
- Cinematography: Igor Oberberg
- Edited by: Walter Wischniewsky
- Music by: Heino Gaze
- Production company: Melodie Film
- Distributed by: Herzog Filmverleih
- Release date: 24 September 1952
- Running time: 93 minutes
- Country: Germany
- Language: German

Homesick for You (German: Heimweh nach dir) is a 1952 West German musical film directed by Robert A. Stemmle and starring Margot Hielscher, Peter Pasetti and Josefin Kipper. It was shot at the Tempelhof Studios in West Berlin. The film's sets were designed by the art directors Franz Schroedter and Karl Weber.

== Cast ==
- Margot Hielscher as Marion Peters
- Peter Pasetti as Kurt Hellwig
- Josefin Kipper as Gretl Fiala
- Peter Mosbacher as Walter Schumann
- Wilfried Seyferth as Vicky Hanke
- Walter Gross as Paulchen Friese
- Wolfgang Lukschy as Georg Weiler
- Bully Buhlan as Singer
- Rita Paul as Kläre Winter
- Käthe Haack as Frau Peters
- Emmy Burg as Witwe Zillmann
- Martin Held as Direktor Petermann
- Paul Esser as Otto Klemke
- Renate Feuereisen as Eva Wandel
- Liselotte Malkowsky as Singer
- Helmut Zacharias as Violin
- Gerhard Wendland as Singer
- Michael Schuricke as Singer
- Rudi Schuricke as Singer
- Friedel Hensch as Singer
- Heino Gaze
- Kurt Weber as Singer
- Anni Dobra as Freundin von Petermann
- Kurt Engel
- Das Cornell-Trio as Singers
- Paul Heidemann
- Rias Tanzorchester as Orchestra
- The Schöneberger Sängerknaben
- Ruth Stephan
- Ivo Veit

== Bibliography ==
- Parish, James Robert. Film Actors Guide. Scarecrow Press, 1977.
