= Southern Nights (film) =

1953 film directed by Robert A. Stemmle

- Directed by: Robert A. Stemmle
- Written by: Robert A. Stemmle; Aldo von Pinelli
- Produced by: Heinz-Joachim Ewert
- Starring: Margit Saad; Erwin Strahl; Waltraut Haas
- Cinematography: Bruno Mondi
- Edited by: Wolfgang Wehrum
- Music by: Gerhard Winkler
- Production companies: Herzog-Filmverleih; Melodie Film
- Distributed by: Herzog Filmverleih
- Release date: 8 September 1953
- Running time: 97 minutes
- Country: West Germany
- Language: German

Southern Nights (German: Südliche Nächte) is a 1953 West German musical film directed by Robert A. Stemmle and starring Margit Saad, Erwin Strahl and Waltraut Haas. It was shot at the Bavaria Studios in Munich with extensive location shooting in Italy. The film's sets were designed by the art director Karl Weber.

== Partial cast ==
- Margit Saad as Gina
- Erwin Strahl as Renato
- Waltraut Haas as Eva
- Germaine Damar as Angela
- Walter Giller as Thomas
- Walter Müller as Harry
- Albert Florath as Buschmann
- Wilfried Seyferth as Zaccarella
- René Carol as Singender Gitarrist, Capri-Fischer
- Giovanna Cigoli as Mama Bianca
- Leonard Steckel as Giuseppe
- Alfred Pongratz as Zollbeamter

== Bibliography ==
- Bock, Hans-Michael & Bergfelder, Tim. The Concise Cinegraph: Encyclopaedia of German Cinema. Berghahn Books, 2009.
