= So ein Millionär hat's schwer =

1958 Austrian comedy film

- Directed by: Géza von Cziffra
- Written by: Gustav Kampendonk (screenplay); Ferdinand Altenkirch (novella); Géza von Cziffra (uncredited)
- Produced by: Alfred Lehr (producer)
- Starring: See below
- Cinematography: Walter Tuch
- Edited by: Eleonore Kunze
- Music by: Heinz Gietz
- Release date: 1958
- Running time: 90 minutes
- Country: Austria
- Language: German

So ein Millionär hat's schwer is a 1958 Austrian film directed by Géza von Cziffra.

== Cast ==
- Peter Alexander as Edward Collin
- Germaine Damar as Ninette
- Heinz Erhardt as Alfons Rappert
- Loni Heuser as Madame Sorel
- Elga Andersen as Alice Sorel
- Erich Fiedler as Hoteldirektor Hercule Blanc
- Louis Soldan as Liebhaber Armand
- Brigitte Mira as Madame Pillard
- Ernst Waldbrunn as Gefängniswärter Raymond
- Erich Nikowitz as Butler Jean
- Fritz Eckhardt as Wirt Napoleon
- Raoul Retzer as Motorradpolizist
- Hans Podehl as Schlagzeuger Robert
- Armand Ozory as Herzog von Baskerville
- Melanie Horeschowsky
- Edith Hieronimus
- Eva Iro
- Traudl Eichinger
- Felix Czerny
- Hans Hais as Kommissar
- Otto Stumvoll
- Harry Kratz
- Wolfgang Wahl as Marcel Magnol

== Soundtrack ==
- Peter Alexander - "Venga, Venga Musica!" (Music by Heinz Gietz, lyrics by Kurt Feltz)
- Peter Alexander - "Er war ein Musikant" (Music by Heinz Gietz, lyrics by Kurt Feltz)
- Peter Alexander - "Fabelhaft!" (Music by Heinz Gietz, lyrics by Kurt Feltz)
- Peter Alexander - "Hab'n Sie nicht ein schönes großes Faß da?" (Music by Heinz Gietz, lyrics by Kurt Feltz)
- Peter Alexander and Heinz Erhardt - "Tun Sie's nicht!" (Music by Heinz Gietz, lyrics by Kurt Feltz)
- Peter Alexander and Germaine Damar - "Venga, Venga Musica!" (reprise)
