= Olive Moorefield =

American actress and singer (born 1932)

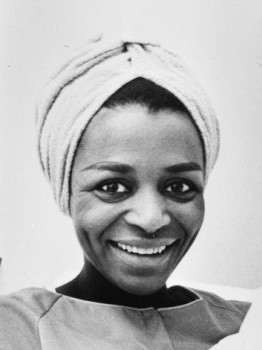
- Olive Moorefield in 1970
- Born: August 23, 1932 (age 93); Pittsburgh, United States
- Occupation: Actress
- Years active: 1954–1976

Olive Moorefield (born August 23, 1932) is an American actress and singer. She appeared in more than twenty films from 1954 to 1976.

== Early years ==
Moorefield is one of eight children. When she was 5 years old, she began studying music, and at 8 she was singing solos in church. At 16, she began studying opera with the help of a $4,000 scholarship from a radio station in her home town Pittsburgh. Her early employment included babysitting, singing in night clubs, and stenography. After she graduated from Homestead High School, she attended Carnegie Institute of Technology and then transferred to the Pennsylvania College for Women.

== Career ==
On stage, Moorefield sang with the Pittsburgh Civic Light Opera She appeared in the 1952 Broadway musical My Darlin' Aida at the Winter Garden Theatre. When that production closed, the US Information Service (USIS) employed her to sing American folk songs and spirituals for American military personnel stationed in Austria. She also performed in Carousel and Show Boat in a theater that the USIS opened in Vienna. She used her free time there to study singing and to attend opera and auditioned for Marcel Prawy who brought her to the Vienna Volksoper. There, she sang Bianca, and later Kate, in Kiss Me Kate in 1956. A reviewer in the Österreichische Musikzeitschrift called Moorefield a "hurricane of vitality, high spirits and joy".

In 1964, Moorefield sang the role of Laetitia in a German-language production of Gian Carlo Menotti's The Old Maid and the Thief, conducted by Wolfgang Rennert and directed by Otto Schenk, for Bayerischer Rundfunk. At the Volksoper, she portrayed Bess in a 1965 production of Porgy and Bess. Together with Peter Alexander, she published in 1966 the album Kiss Me Kate. At the Oper Frankfurt, she played Jenny in Kurt Weill's and Bertolt Brecht's Aufstieg und Fall der Stadt Mahagonny in 1966, directed by Harry Buckwitz. In 1972 at the Schauspielhaus Zürich she played Spelunken-Jenny in Brecht's/Weill's Die Dreigroschenoper. Moorefield reprised her Jenny from Mahagonny in 1973 at the Volksoper.

Moorefield's work in films included at least 15 German and Viennese motion pictures. She also recorded German Schlager and performed in an Italian-language production of Kiss Me Kate on Italian television. In 1962, she became one of the first TV stars in Germany. Her work on European TV included starring in the drama Requiem für eine Nonne, an adaptation of William Faulkner's 1951 novel Requiem for a Nun.

The American National Opera Association recognized Moorefield in 2014 with the "Lift Every Voice" Legacy Award.

== Personal life ==
Moorefield married Kurt Macht, a doctor whom she met when he treated her for a throat problem in Vienna. They have one son.

== Partial filmography ==
Year	Title	Role
1956	The Old Forester House	Singer
1957	Just Once a Great Lady	Olive, singer
1957	The Legs of Dolores	Singer
1957	Love from Paris	Zaza, cleaner
1962	Street of Temptation	Singer
1965	Uncle Tom's Cabin	Cassy
