= Dancing Stars (film) =

1952 film

- German film poster
- German: Tanzende Sterne
- Directed by: Géza von Cziffra
- Written by: Géza von Cziffra
- Produced by: Otto Meissner; Géza von Cziffra
- Starring: Germaine Damar; Georg Thomalla; Fita Benkhoff
- Cinematography: Georg Bruckbauer
- Edited by: Alice Ludwig
- Music by: Michael Jary
- Production company: Arion-Film
- Distributed by: Herzog Film
- Release date: 27 November 1952
- Running time: 94 minutes
- Country: West Germany
- Language: German

Dancing Stars (German: Tanzende Sterne) is a 1952 West German musical comedy film directed by Géza von Cziffra and starring Germaine Damar, Georg Thomalla and Fita Benkhoff. It was shot at the Wandsbek Studios of Real Film in Hamburg and on location at Travemünde. The film's sets were designed by the art directors Albrecht Becker and Herbert Kirchhoff.

== Synopsis ==
Nicolle Ferrar owns a nightclub in Hamburg, but due to her reckless behaviour she loses control of it and has to escape her creditors by fleeing to the Italian Riviera. There she meets the wealthy English racehorse owner Sir Thomas Gregorian. She falsely claims that the two are engaged, but his family are suspicious of this fortune hunter.

Bob, the son of Sir Thomas, is sent to investigate nightclub to demonstrate Nicolle's shady background. There he encounters her daughter, with the exact same name as her mother who is trying to relaunch the nightspot. To the irritation of his fiancée Daisy, Bob begins to fall for Nicolle. As he still wrongly believes she is the same woman involved with his father, a series of further misunderstandings occur.

== Cast ==
- Germaine Damar as Nicolle Ferrar
- Fita Benkhoff as Nicolle Ferrar, her mother
- Georg Thomalla as Bob Gregorian
- Axel von Ambesser as Sir Thomas Gregorian
- Ursula Justin as Daisy
- Alice Treff as Daisy's mother
- Ursula Herking as Jeannette
- Vera Marks as Sylvia
- Inge Meysel as Sylvia's mother
- Oskar Sima as Alfons
- Joseph Offenbach as Gerichtsvollzieher
- Carl-Heinz Schroth as Gregor Gregorian
- Ilja Glusgal as singer
- Evelyn Künneke as singer
- Rita Paul as singer
- Leila Negra as singer
- Kenneth Spencer as singer
- Gerhard Wendland as singer
- Lonny Kellner as singer
- Das Montez-Ballett as dancers
- Das Cornell-Trio as singers
- Hiller-Girls as dancers
- Helmut Ketels as dancer
- Liselotte Köster as dancer
- Edward Lane as dancer
- Jockel Stahl as dancer
- Günther Fuhlisch as Trombone player (Philhamonisches Filmorchester)
- Macky Kasper as Trumpet player (Philhamonisches Filmorchester)
- Rolf Kühn as Clarinet player (Philhamonisches Filmorchester)
