= We Will Never Part =

1960 film

- Directed by: Harald Reinl
- Written by: Carlo Fedier; Werner P. Zibaso
- Produced by: Artur Brauner; Georg M. Reuther
- Starring: Adrian Hoven; Vivi Bach; Kurt Großkurth
- Cinematography: Ernst W. Kalinke
- Edited by: Ingrid Wacker
- Music by: Arno Flor; Erich Werner
- Production company: Alfa Film
- Distributed by: Constantin Film
- Release date: 21 December 1960
- Running time: 92 minutes
- Country: West Germany
- Language: German

We Will Never Part (German: Wir wollen niemals auseinandergehn) is a 1960 West German musical comedy film directed by Harald Reinl and starring Adrian Hoven, Vivi Bach and Kurt Großkurth.

It was shot at the Spandau Studios in Berlin. The film's sets were designed by the art directors Emil Hasler and Walter Kutz.

The film title was based on a popular song by Heidi Brühl.

== Cast ==
- Adrian Hoven as Guido Terni
- Vivi Bach as Marisa
- Kurt Großkurth as Marcello Ponella
- Nadja Regin as Livia
- Gerhard Hartig as Gabor Tamarthy
- Thomas Alder as Tonio Ronella
- Stanislav Ledinek as Paolo
- Franz-Otto Krüger as Rosinelli
- Werner Stock as Giuseppe
- Jürgen Feindt as Boubou
- Grethe Weiser as Theatersekretärin Lisa
- René Carol as Singer
- Leo Leandros as Singer
- Jan Wennick as Singer
- Kjeld Wennick as Singer

== Bibliography ==
- Bock, Hans-Michael; Bergfelder, Tim, eds. (2009). The Concise Cinegraph: Encyclopaedia of German Cinema. New York: Berghahn Books. ISBN 978-1-57181-655-9.
