= Rita Paul =

German singer and film actress (1928–2021)

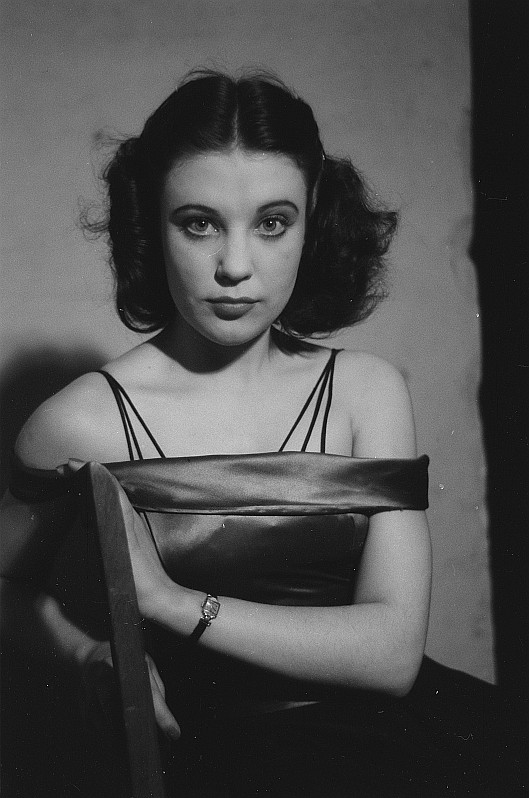
- Paul in 1949
- Born: 2 December 1928; Berlin, Germany
- Died: 27 March 2021 (aged 92); Berlin, Germany
- Other name: Rita Brigitte Paul
- Occupations: Actress, singer
- Years active: 1948–1981 (film & TV)

Rita Brigitte Paul (2 December 1928 – 27 March 2021) was a German singer and film actress.

== Life and career ==
Paul was a successful Schlager singer in the 1950s, having been discovered by Walter Jenson as early as 1945 at the Crusader Club in Hamburg. She frequently performed alongside Bully Buhlan. She also appeared in several feature films, in which she often performed as a singer. Additionally, she made a name for herself as a cabaret artist while a member of the group "Die Insulaner."

== Selected filmography ==
- The Reluctant Maharaja (1950)
- Scandal at the Embassy (1950)
- The Man in Search of Himself (1950)
- Homesick for You (1952)
- Ideal Woman Sought (1952)
- Hit Parade (1953)
- My Leopold (1955)
- When the Heath Is in Bloom (1960)

== Bibliography ==
- Shandley, Robert. Rubble Films: German Cinema In Shadow Of the Third Reich. Temple University Press, 2010.
