= Such a Charade =

1953 film directed by Erik Ode

- Directed by: Erik Ode
- Written by: Jobst Arndt; Hans Fritz Beckmann; Wolf Neumeister (novel); Helmut Withrich (novel)
- Starring: Josefin Kipper; Joachim Brennecke; Heli Finkenzeller
- Cinematography: Otto Baecker; Kurt Hasse
- Edited by: Elfi Tillack
- Music by: Peter Kreuder; Heinrich Riethmüller
- Production company: Ito-Film
- Distributed by: Allianz Filmverleih
- Release date: 7 August 1953
- Running time: 78 minutes
- Country: West Germany
- Language: German

Such a Charade (German: So ein Affentheater) is a 1953 West German comedy film directed by Erik Ode and starring Josefin Kipper, Joachim Brennecke and Heli Finkenzeller.

== Main cast ==
- Josefin Kipper as Sabine Keller
- Joachim Brennecke as Stefan Popp
- Heli Finkenzeller as Dorette Schilling
- Walter Gross as Muskat, Klavierstimmer
- Erika von Thellmann as Frau Droysen
- Carola Höhn as Fräulein Dr. Barioz
- Christiane Jansen as Fräulein Steen, Reporterin
- Maria Sebaldt as Elinor, Zimmermädchen
- Eva Rimski as Lilo Messner
- Franz-Otto Krüger as Gersdorf, Versicherungsagent
- Stanislav Ledinek as Kovacz
- Karl Hellmer as Neditsch
- Karin Evans as Fräulein Winterfeld
- Agnes Windeck as Frau Angelroth
- Rolf Weih as Dr. Usedom
- Paul Heidemann as Herr Angelroth
- Kurt Weitkamp as Mr. Cleaver
- Victor Janson as Gerichtsvollzieher
- Erwin Biegel as Austermann, Hausmeister
- Das Cornell-Trio as Singer

== Bibliography ==
- Bock, Hans-Michael & Bergfelder, Tim. The Concise CineGraph. Encyclopedia of German Cinema. Berghahn Books, 2009.
