= Ingrid Wacker =

German film editor

- Died: 4 August 2009; Hamburg, Germany
- Occupation: Film editor
- Years active: 1954-1975

Ingrid Wacker (died 4 August 2009) was a German film editor.

== Selected filmography ==
- On the Reeperbahn at Half Past Midnight (1954)
- My Leopold (1955)
- How Do I Become a Film Star? (1955)
- Yes, Yes, Love in Tyrol (1955)
- Black Forest Melody (1956)
- The Legs of Dolores (1957)
- Doctor Bertram (1957)
- The Copper (1958)
- Black Forest Cherry Schnapps (1958)
- The Muzzle (1958)
- Iron Gustav (1958)
- Peter Shoots Down the Bird (1959)
- Of Course, the Motorists (1959)
- Adorable Arabella (1959)
- We Will Never Part (1960)
- Heaven, Love and Twine (1960)
- The Red Hand (1960)
- You Must Be Blonde on Capri (1961)

== Bibliography ==
- Cowie, Peter. World Filmography. Tantivy Press, 1968.
