= Peter Shoots Down the Bird =

1959 film

- German: Peter schießt den Vogel ab
- Directed by: Géza von Cziffra
- Written by: Gustav Kampendonk; Géza von Cziffra
- Produced by: Artur Brauner; Horst Wendlandt
- Starring: Peter Alexander; Germaine Damar; Maria Sebaldt
- Cinematography: Richard Angst
- Edited by: Ingrid Wacker
- Music by: Kurt Feltz; Heinz Gietz
- Production companies: CCC Film; Alfa Film
- Distributed by: Neue Filmverleih
- Release date: 14 May 1959
- Running time: 89 minutes
- Country: West Germany
- Languages: German; French; English

Peter Shoots Down the Bird (German: Peter schießt den Vogel ab) is a 1959 West German comedy film directed by Géza von Cziffra and starring Peter Alexander, Germaine Damar and Maria Sebaldt.

It was shot at the Spandau Studios in Berlin. The film's sets were designed by the art directors Paul Markwitz and Heinrich Weidemann.

== Plot ==
Peter Schatz is a front desk manager at a hotel where he is very popular with all the guests. However, he struggles to get along with the hotel director, who is a bit of a pedantic tyrant and feared by all staff, and switchboard lady Renate of another hotel. Beside his work he has ambitions to travel the world. When he inherits a larger sum of money from a former hotel guest in gratitude for his services to her and her dog, his colleague Mathilde suggests he could go on a ski trip into a posh ski resort in the Austrian Alps. At first his attempt to book a room in the Grand Hotel in Zürs am Arlberg is futile, as they are completely booked, so he comes up with a lie, pretending he was an Argentinian beef and cattle king to get a room.

Before he leaves, Peter drops in to the hotel director's office and tells him he needs several weeks of annual leave. The director does not want to grant these and thinks Peter has gotten crazy, so he orders an ambulance with strong carers from the local mental institution, but Peter manages to get the director mad and raging, so the director ends up in a straight jacket himself and is taken away. In the evening Peter celebrates a farewell party with all the hotel staff and in the next morning sets off on his travels.

On holiday, he incidentally meets Renate, and falls in love with her. He soon realises who she is, although she does not for him. Afraid to anger her, he keeps the tale of the cattle king going. The disguise causes a lot of confusion.

Peter attempts several types of winter and alpine sports, although he is very bad at them. Peter then attracts the attention of a fraudster lady residing in the neighbouring hotel room, who believe him to be very rich as well and scheme to rob him.

== Cast ==
- Peter Alexander as Peter Schatz
- Germaine Damar as Renate Hartwig
- Maria Sebaldt as Marilyn
- Oskar Sima as Director Wilfried Adler
- Ernst Waldow as General Bumm
- Agnes Windeck as Rose
- Anneliese Würtz as Marie
- Edith Hancke as Fräulein Lehmann
- Jo Herbst as Dr. Klaus Maria Weichholz
- Axel Monjé as Marilyn's accomplice
- Friedrich Schoenfelder as Toni Hartwig
- Bob Iller as Portier Blümli
- Herbert Weissbach as Mr. Pieps
- Hans W. Hamacher as Lawyer Hammel
- Christine von Trümbach
- Ruth Stephan as Mathilde Hütchen

== Soundtrack ==
- Peter Alexander - "Ins weiße Wolkenschlößchen"
- Peter Alexander - "Hol den Peter"
- Peter Alexander - "Piccolo-Ponny"
- Peter Alexander - "Torero der Liebe"
