= Wolfgang Wahl =

German actor

- Born: 3 December 1925; Münster, Germany
- Died: 15 September 2006 (aged 80); Germering, Germany
- Occupation: Actor
- Years active: 1953-1996

Wolfgang Wahl (3 December 1925 – 15 September 2006) was a German actor. He appeared in more than one hundred films from 1953 to 1996.

== Filmography ==
Year	Title	Role	Notes
1954	08/15	Unteroffizier Schwitzke	
1954	Ein Mädchen aus Paris		
1955	Verrat an Deutschland	SS-Oberführer Schollinger	
1955	Hello, My Name is Cox	Detektiv Richardson	
1955	Heroism after Hours	Karl	(segment "Captain Fox")
1955	A Heart Full of Music	Peer Saldo	
1955	Bandits of the Autobahn	Franz Möller	
1955	Three Girls from the Rhine	Fritz Junghans	
1956	Die wilde Auguste	Peter Kerbholz	
1956	Ich und meine Schwiegersöhne		
1956	Das Liebesleben des schönen Franz	Heinz Brandt	
1956	Die Rosel vom Schwarzwald	Bambi	
1956	The Beautiful Master	Rhomberg	
1956	Saison in Oberbayern	Altmann	
1957	Haie und kleine Fische	Leitender Ingenieur auf dem U-Boot	
1958	Scampolo	Baptiste	
1958	The Green Devils of Monte Cassino	Greinert	
1958	Grabenplatz 17	Kriminalsekretär Willy Wagenknecht	
1958	The Trapp Family in America	Patrick	
1958	So ein Millionär hat's schwer	Marcel Magnol	
1959	Nick Knatterton’s Adventure	Tresor-Otto	
1959	Schlag auf Schlag	Caesar Zorn	
1959	La Paloma	Herr Haase	
1959	Bobby Dodd greift ein		
1959	Menschen im Hotel	Chauffeur Max	
1959	Roses for the Prosecutor	Defense Counsel	
1959	The Buddenbrooks	Hermann Wagenström	part 1, 2
1959	Paradise for Sailors	Kapitän Wiegand	
1960	Brainwashed	Moonface	
1960	Sooo nicht, meine Herren	Sandrini, der Opportunist	
1960	When the Heath Is in Bloom	Anton	
1962	Genosse Münchhausen	Alfons Altmann	
1962	Straße der Verheißung	Marcello	
1962	Lieder klingen am Lago Maggiore	Alexander Schneider	
1963	The Squeaker	Sergeant Lomm	
1964	Tim Frazer	Martin Cordwell	TV miniseries
1971	Und Jimmy ging zum Regenbogen		
1979	The Murderer	Untersuchungsrichter	
