= Barbara (1961 film) =

1961 film directed by Frank Wisbar

- Directed by: Frank Wisbar
- Written by: Christian Munk
- Based on: Barbara by Jørgen-Frantz Jacobsen
- Produced by: Georg Mohr
- Starring: Harriet Andersson; Maria Sebaldt; Carl Lange
- Cinematography: Klaus von Rautenfeld
- Edited by: Martha Dübber
- Music by: Werner Eisbrenner
- Production company: UFA Film Hansa
- Distributed by: UFA Film Hansa
- Release date: 28 November 1961
- Running time: 96 minutes
- Country: West Germany
- Language: German

Barbara (German: Barbara - Wild wie das Meer) is a 1961 West German drama film directed by Frank Wisbar and starring Harriet Andersson, Maria Sebaldt and Carl Lange. The film was adapted from the 1939 novel of the same title by Jørgen-Frantz Jacobsen. It was filmed at studios in Copenhagen, with additional location shooting in the Faroe Islands where the film is set.

== Cast ==
- Harriet Andersson as Barbara
- Maria Sebaldt as Vupsen
- Carl Lange as Amtmann Heyde
- Helmut Griem as Paul
- Hans Nielsen as Mikkelsen
- Josef Albrecht as Henry
- Erika Dannhoff as Sophie
- Jens Due as Tanzender Gast
- Erich Dunskus as Harpunen-Olaf
- Tilla Durieux as Armgart
- Hans Elwenspoek as Pastor
- Herbert Fleischmann as Gabriel
- Günter Lüdke as Tanfloh
- Nora Minor as Barbara's Mutter
- Hans Paetsch as Inselvogt Harme
- Xenia Pörtner as Susanne
- Renate Rolfs as Angelika
- Erik Schumann as Dr. Nielsson
- Hans von Borsody as Andreas
- Henrik Wiehe as Seeoffizier

== Bibliography ==
- Henry Nicolella. Frank Wisbar: The Director of Ferryman Maria, from Germany to America and Back. McFarland, 2018.
- James Robert Parish & Michael R. Pitts. Film directors: a guide to their American films. Scarecrow Press, 1974.
