= Yes, Yes, Love in Tyrol =

1955 film directed by Géza von Bolváry

- Theatrical film poster
- German: Ja, ja die Liebe in Tirol
- Directed by: Géza von Bolváry
- Written by: Gustav Kampendonk
- Based on: Kohlhiesel's Daughters by Hanns Kräly
- Produced by: Kurt Ulrich
- Starring: Gerhard Riedmann; Hans Moser; Doris Kirchner
- Cinematography: Kurt Schulz
- Edited by: Ingrid Wacker
- Music by: Werner Müller
- Production company: Berolina Film
- Distributed by: Constantin Film
- Release date: 15 December 1955
- Running time: 100 minutes
- Country: West Germany
- Language: German

Yes, Yes, Love in Tyrol (German: Ja, ja die Liebe in Tirol) is a 1955 West German musical comedy film directed by Géza von Bolváry and starring Gerhard Riedmann, Hans Moser, and Doris Kirchner. It is a loose reworking of the plot of the play Kohlhiesel's Daughters by Hanns Kräly.

It was shot at the Tempelhof Studios in West Berlin and on location in Tyrol. The film's sets were designed by the art director Hans Kuhnert.

== Cast ==
- Gerhard Riedmann as Peter Lenz
- Hans Moser as Ignaz Musbauer
- Doris Kirchner as Gretel Musbauer
- Carla Hagen as Liesel Musbauer
- Gunther Philipp as Hans Bondy
- Susi Nicoletti as Barbara Tusma
- Peter W. Staub as Harry Frankenstein
- Hans Olden as Forstraut Lechner
- Franz Muxeneder as Karl Kleinholz
- Elfie Pertramer as Resi
- Friedl Hardt as Bibi
- Don Cossack Choir as themselves
- Serge Jaroff as himself
- Liselotte Köster as dancer
- Jockel Stahl as dancer
- Anton Karas as himself
- Werner Kroll as director Bimsl
- Toni Praxmayer as himself
- Sunshine Quartett as themselves
- Das Cornell-Trio as themselves
- RIAS Kammerchor as themselves
- Werner Müller as himself
- RIAS Tanzorchester as themselves
- Gerd Frickhöffer as guest at Tarantella

== Bibliography ==
- Hake, Sabine (2009). Bock, Hans-Michael; Bergfelder, Tim (eds.). The Concise Cinegraph: Encyclopaedia of German Cinema. New York, NY: Berghahn Books. doi:10.2307/j.ctt1x76dm6. ISBN 978-1571816559. JSTOR j.ctt1x76dm6. S2CID 252868046.
