= Of Course, the Motorists =

1959 film

- Directed by: Erich Engels
- Written by: Gustav Kampendonk
- Produced by: Otto Meissner
- Starring: Heinz Erhardt; Maria Perschy; Erik Schumann
- Cinematography: Albert Benitz
- Edited by: Ingrid Wacker
- Music by: Peter Igelhoff
- Production company: Deutsche Film Hansa
- Distributed by: Deutsche Film Hansa
- Release date: 20 August 1959
- Running time: 82 minutes
- Country: West Germany
- Language: German

Of Course, the Motorists (German: Natürlich die Autofahrer) is a 1959 West German comedy film directed by Erich Engels and starring Heinz Erhardt, Maria Perschy and Erik Schumann.

The film's sets were designed by the art director Walter Haag.

== Cast ==
- Heinz Erhardt as PHW Eberhard Dobermann
- Maria Perschy as Karin Dobermann
- Erik Schumann as Walter Schliewen
- Ruth Stephan as Jutta Schmalbach
- Trude Herr as Frau Rumberg, Fahrlehrerin
- Margitta Scherr as Gisela
- Edith Hancke as Autofahrerin
- Arne Madin as Felix Dobermann
- Ralf Wolter as Oberwachtmeister
- Willy Maertens as Film-Regisseur
- Bob Iller as Quizmeister
- Hans Paetsch as Polizeipräsident
- Jöns Andersson as Jugendlicher (Nr. 3)
- Klaus Behrendt as Toningenieur beim Polizeifest
- Peter Frankenfeld as Karl Bierbaum
- Frank Duval as Singer
- Geschwister Duval as Gesang
- María Duval as Singer
- Friedel Hensch und die Cyprys as Gesang
- Karl-Heinz Gerdesmann as 2. LKW-Fahrer
- Max Giese as Moderator beim Polizeifest
- Klaus Hellmold
- Martin Hirthe as Baurat Welker
- Günther Jerschke as 1. LKW-Fahrer
- Dieter Neckritz as Mann
- Norbert Skalden as Fahrlehrer
- Günther Ungeheuer as Verkehrspolizist

== Bibliography ==
- Hake, Sabine. German National Cinema. Routledge, 2013.
