= Paradise for Sailors =

1959 film

- Directed by: Harald Reinl
- Written by: Curt J. Braun; Helmut Weiss
- Based on: Es begann im Gelben Drachen (novel) by Vineta Bastian-Klinger
- Produced by: Kurt Ulrich
- Starring: Margit Saad; Boy Gobert; Mara Lane
- Cinematography: Georg Bruckbauer
- Edited by: Walter von Bonhorst
- Music by: Werner Scharfenberger
- Production company: Kurt Ulrich Filmproduktion
- Distributed by: UFA
- Release date: 26 November 1959
- Running time: 102 minutes
- Country: West Germany
- Language: German

Paradise for Sailors (German: Paradies der Matrosen) is a 1959 West German comedy film directed by Harald Reinl and starring Margit Saad, Boy Gobert and Mara Lane.

The film's sets were designed by the art director Willi Herrmann. The film was shot at Tempelhof Studios and on location in Rio de Janeiro.

== Cast ==
- Margit Saad as Jachtbesitzerin Barbara Riccardi
- Boy Gobert as Seemann Kai Brinkmann
- Mara Lane as Zofe Jenny
- Wolfgang Wahl as Kapitän Wiegand
- Jan Hendriks as Henry F. Jones
- Peter Weck as Robby Hansen
- Peter Nestler as Seemann Erik Petersen
- Karin Heske as Doris Webb
- Bum Krüger as Maat
- Henri Cogan as Matrose Joe
- Irene Borinski as Doris Webb
- Ralf Roberts as Singender Matrose Hein

== Bibliography ==
- Goble, Alan (1999). The Complete Index to Literary Sources in Film. Walter de Gruyter. ISBN 978-3-11-095194-3.
