= The Crammer =

1958 film

- Directed by: Axel von Ambesser
- Written by: Curth Flatow; Eckart Hachfeld
- Produced by: Claus Hardt; Kurt Ulrich
- Starring: Heinz Rühmann; Wera Frydtberg; Gert Fröbe
- Cinematography: Erich Claunigk
- Edited by: Walter Boos
- Music by: Raimund Rosenberger
- Production company: Kurt Ulrich Filmproduktion
- Distributed by: Gloria Film
- Release date: 3 October 1958
- Running time: 91 minutes
- Country: West Germany
- Language: German

The Crammer (German: Der Pauker) is a 1958 West German comedy film directed by Axel von Ambesser and starring Heinz Rühmann, Wera Frydtberg and Gert Fröbe. It was shot at the Bavaria Studios in Munich. The film's sets were designed by the art directors Hans Berthel and Robert Stratil.

== Plot ==
Germany in the mid-1950s: Dr. Seidel (Rühmann) is a successful teacher at a high school in a provincial town. Old fashioned and dutiful as he is, he takes on the challenge to teach a graduating class at a big city high school, when asked by the governmental school inspector. On arrival at his new working place he is hit by a student while trying to settle a quarrel among youngsters in the schoolyard. The beginning looks like an omen: his new class proves to be an unruly gang. While trying to establish discipline, Dr. Seidel makes himself quite unpopular; he even becomes the target of intimidation attempts by a former student (Löwitsch), who is now a gang leader with criminal ambitions. However Dr. Seidel is made of stern stuff and step by step wins the respect first of one student (Kraus), then of all others, and he learns to respect the students. In contrast, gang leader Engelmann loses his following.

In a side story Dr. Seidel courts the older sister (Frydtberg) of a student but his advances are unsuccessful, so he falls back to a co-teacher (Löbel) living next door in the same boardinghouse. Another resident at the boardinghouse is a wrestler (Fröbe) who teaches him wrestling skills in exchange for literacy lessons.

== Cast ==
- Heinz Rühmann as Dr. Hermann Seidel
- Wera Frydtberg as Vera Bork
- Gert Fröbe as Freddy Blei
- Peter Kraus as Achim Bork
- Bruni Löbel as Frl. Selinski
- Ernst Fritz Fürbringer as School inspector Wagner
- Hans Leibelt as Headmaster Wiesbacher
- Franz-Otto Krüger as Headmaster Gaspari
- Klaus Löwitsch as Harry Engelmann
- Ernst Reinhold as Martin Rössler
- Michael Verhoeven as Peter Wieland
- Peter Vogel as Eduard Neureiter
- Axel Scholtz as Axel
- Hans Zander as Rudi Bär

== Bibliography ==
- Reimer, Robert C. & Reimer, Carol J. The A to Z of German Cinema. Scarecrow Press, 2010.
