= Peter Igelhoff =

Austrian pianist, composer, arranger and entertainer (1904–1978)

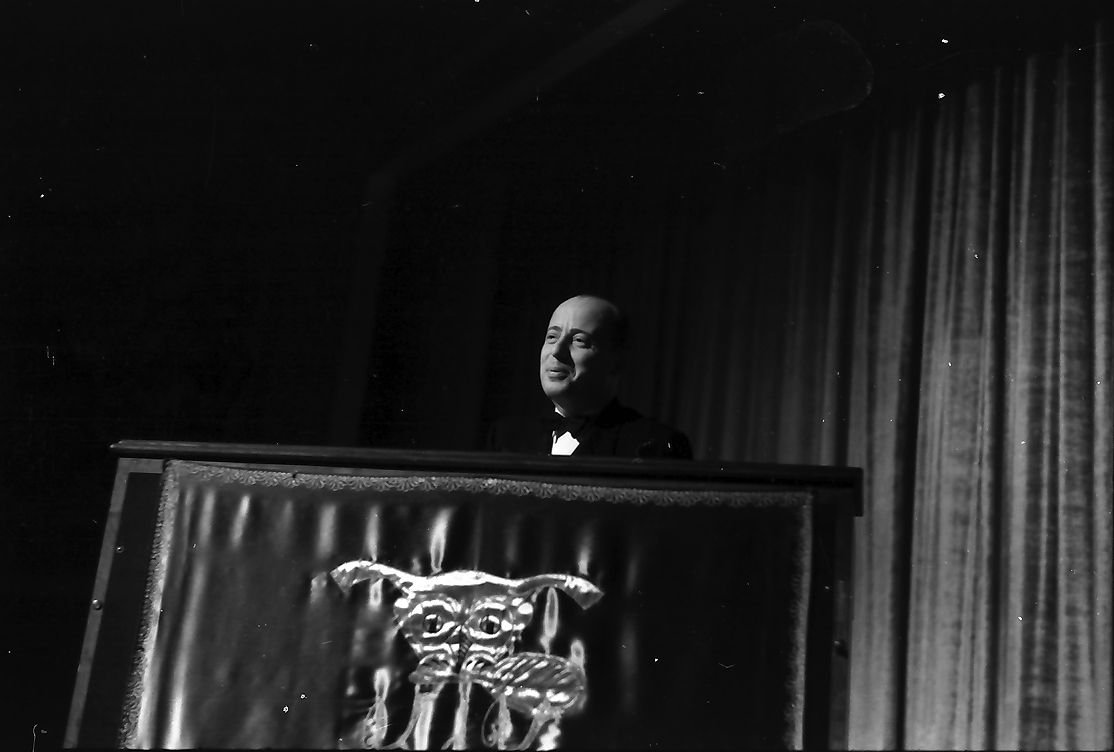
Peter Igelhoff

Peter Igelhoff (born Rudolf August Ordnung, 22 July 1904 in Vienna – 8 April 1978 in Bad Reichenhall) was an Austrian pianist, light music and film composer, arranger and entertainer; he took his mother's maiden name as soon as he resolved on a career in light entertainment.

Igelhoff made an early career as a jazz pianist in bars before deciding to hone his playing style by studying in London in the early 1930s. He moved to Amsterdam and later in 1935 to Berlin where he became extremely busy in film and recording studio work with a group including fellow composer-pianist Georg Haentzschel (1907–1992). Many of Igelhoff's light songs sold very well and his career was not hindered initially by the outbreak of war in 1939, although by and by the National Socialists started to deem his music too American in style and it was eventually banned. By the later 1940s his style went slightly out of fashion but he managed to keep reasonably busy almost to the end of his life, by which time his work had been rewarded with a professorship.

Igelhoff was a pianist with an enviable concert technique, which accompanied his light tenor voice (and occasionally his virtuoso whistling) in songs.

== Filmography ==
- Two Women (1938)
- We Make Music (1942)
- Hooray, It's a Boy! (1953)
- Hit Parade (1953)
- One Woman Is Not Enough? (1955)
- The Double Husband (1955)
- Love, Summer and Music (1956)
- Two Bavarians in the Jungle (1957)
- Two Bavarians in the Harem (1957)
- Of Course, the Motorists (1959)
- Paprika (1959)
