= The Three from the Filling Station (1955 film) =

1955 film

- Directed by: Hans Wolff
- Written by: Gustav Kampendonk
- Produced by: Willi Forst; Kurt Ulrich
- Starring: Adrian Hoven; Walter Müller; Walter Giller; Germaine Damar
- Cinematography: Willi Sohm
- Edited by: Hermann Leitner
- Music by: Werner R. Heymann
- Production company: Berolina Film
- Distributed by: Herzog Film
- Release date: 22 December 1955
- Running time: 93 minutes
- Country: West Germany
- Language: German

The Three from the Filling Station (German: Die Drei von der Tankstelle) is a 1955 West German musical film directed by Hans Wolff and starring Adrian Hoven, Walter Müller and Walter Giller. It was shot at the Tempelhof Studios in West Berlin and on location around the city. The film's sets were designed by the art directors Kurt Herlth and Hans Kuhnert.

The film is a remake of the 1930 UFA film The Three from the Filling Station. It was one of a series of remakes made during the 1950s of major hits during the Weimar and Nazi eras. A separate French-language remake The Road to Paradise was released in 1956.

== Synopsis ==
After losing their money, three young men go to work at a filling station where each of them falls in love with the same beautiful and well-off woman and work hard to hide their feelings for her from each other.

== Cast ==
- Adrian Hoven as Peter
- Walter Müller as Robert
- Walter Giller as Fritz
- Germaine Damar as Gaby Kossmann
- Willy Fritsch as Konsul Willy Kossmann
- Claude Farell as Irene von Turoff
- Oskar Sima as Dr. Calmus
- Wolfgang Neuss as Prokurist Bügel
- Hans Moser as Autofahrer
- Rudolf Vogel as Gerichtsvollzieher
- Hilde Hildebrand as Handleserin
- Fritz Imhoff as Chef der Kaufhaus A.G.
- Alexa von Porembsky as Sekretärin
- Oscar Sabo as Zigarettenhändler
- Carl Hinrichs as Bäcker
- Rolf Olsen as Bauer
- Hans Schwarz as Automechaniker
- Friedl Hardt as Frau bei der Autoreparatur

== See also ==
- The Merry Quartet from the Filling Station, a 1972 film directed by Franz Antel

== Bibliography ==
- Bergfelder, Tim & Bock, Hans-Michael. The Concise Cinegraph: Encyclopedia of German. Berghahn Books, 2009.
