= Bataan (film) =

1943 American film directed by Tay Garnett

- Theatrical release poster
- Directed by: Tay Garnett
- Written by: Robert Hardy Andrews; Garrett Fort(uncredited); Dudley Nichols(uncredited)
- Produced by: Irving Starr
- Starring: Robert Taylor; George Murphy; Thomas Mitchell; Lloyd Nolan; Lee Bowman; Robert Walker; Desi Arnaz
- Cinematography: Sidney Wagner
- Edited by: George White
- Music by: Bronislau Kaper; Eric Zeisl
- Distributed by: Metro-Goldwyn-Mayer; United States Office of War Information
- Release date: June 3, 1943
- Running time: 114 minutes
- Language: English
- Budget: $958,000
- Box office: $3,117,000

Bataan is a 1943 American black-and-white World War II drama film from Metro-Goldwyn-Mayer, produced by Irving Starr (with Dore Schary as executive producer), and directed by Tay Garnett, that stars Robert Taylor, George Murphy, Lloyd Nolan, Thomas Mitchell, Lee Bowman, Desi Arnaz and Robert Walker. It follows the fates of a group of men charged with destroying a bridge during the doomed defense of the Bataan Peninsula by American forces in the Philippines against the invading Japanese.

== Plot ==
The United States Army is conducting a fighting retreat. A high bridge—a wooden trestle on massive stone pillars—spans a ravine on the Bataan Peninsula. After the Army and some civilians cross, an ad hoc group of thirteen hastily assembled soldiers from different units is assigned to blow it up and delay Japanese rebuilding efforts as long as possible. They dig in on a hillside. They succeed in blowing up the bridge, but their commander, Captain Lassiter, is killed by a sniper, leaving Sergeant Dane in charge.

One by one, the defenders are killed, except Ramirez, who succumbs to malaria. Despite this, the outnumbered soldiers doggedly hold their position. Dane and Todd creep up, undetected, on the bridge the Japanese have partially rebuilt and throw hand grenades, blowing it up. Malloy shoots down an enemy aircraft with his Tommy gun before being killed.

Dane suspects that Todd is a soldier from his past named Danny Burns who was arrested for killing a man in a dispute, but escaped while Dane was guarding him.

Army Air Corps pilot Lieutenant Bentley and his Filipino mechanic, Corporal Katigbak, work frantically to repair a Beechcraft C-43 Traveler aircraft. They succeed, but Katigbak is killed and Bentley is mortally wounded. Bentley has explosives loaded aboard and flies into the bridge's foundation, destroying it for a third time.

The remaining soldiers repel a massive frontal assault, inflicting heavy losses and ultimately fighting hand-to-hand. Epps and Feingold are killed, leaving only Dane, Todd, and a wounded Purckett alive. Purckett is shot, while Todd is stabbed through the back by a Japanese soldier who had only feigned being dead. Before he dies, Todd admits to Dane he is Burns.

Now alone, Dane stoically digs his own marked grave beside those of his fallen comrades. The Japanese crawl through the ground fog near his position before opening fire and charging. Dane fires back; when his Tommy gun runs out of ammo, he switches to an M1917 Browning machine gun. He continually fires it directly into the camera lens as the end card reads: "So fought the heroes of Bataan, Their sacrifice made possible our victories in the Coral and Bismarck Seas, at Midway, on New Guinea and Guadalcanal. Their spirit will lead us back to Bataan!"

== Cast ==
- Robert Taylor as Sergeant Bill Dane
- George Murphy as Lieut. Steve Bentley
- Thomas Mitchell as Corp. Jake Feingold
- Lloyd Nolan as Corp. Barney Todd
- Lee Bowman as Capt. Henry Lassiter
- Robert Walker as Leonard Purckett
- Desi Arnaz as Felix Ramirez
- Barry Nelson as F.X. Matowski
- Phillip Terry as Matthew Hardy
- Roque Espiritu as Corp. Juan Katigbak
- Kenneth Spencer as Wesley Eeps
- J. Alex Havier as Yankee Salazar
- Tom Dugan as Sam Malloy
- Donald Curtis as Lieutenant

== Production ==
The film is notable for depicting a racially diverse but integrated and cohesive fighting force (including a Black, Asian, Latino, and Irish soldier) at a time when the United States military was racially segregated. In his autobiography, Schary wrote that he was intentionally trying to break the color barrier in American war films and was specifically criticized by some studio executives for casting an African-American actor (Kenneth Spencer). None the less, he purposely did not tell writer Robert Andrews which character it would be, so as to avoid any racial dialogue. The depiction of racial integration prevented the film's showing in parts of the American South.

Scenes from the 1934 RKO film The Lost Patrol, directed by John Ford, were reused in this production.

The film premièred in New York City on June 3, 1943.

== Reception ==
Bosley Crowther, critic for The New York Times, described it as "a surprisingly credible conception of what that terrible experience must have been for some of the men who endured it", albeit with "melodramatic flaws and ... some admitted technical mistakes." In the end, "it doesn't insult the honor of dead soldiers". In The Nation in 1943, critic James Agee wrote: "The people who made this film, I judge, were lucky enough to believe in it so warmly and innocently that the small area they staked out in nature remained at the fertile center of their affection, and their cinematic intelligence and skill—with none left over for self-congratulation from the sidelines—were released entirely to the proper business of embodiment. What they had to embody was as formal and naive as a pulp story."

The film was a hit when first released to theaters; according to MGM records it earned $2,049,000 in the US and Canada and $1,068,000 overseas, resulting in a profit of $1,140,000.

== Home media ==
Bataan was released by Warner Home Video on Jan. 31, 2005 as a Region 1, double-sided DVD set that also contained the RKO Radio Pictures World War II feature film Back to Bataan (1945).

== Sources ==
- Farber, Manny. 2009. Farber on Film: The Complete Film Writings of Manny Farber. Edited by Robert Polito. Library of America. ISBN 978-1-59853-050-6
- Richard Slotkin (1992). "The Problem of Defeat: Bataan (1943) as Last Stand". Gunfighter Nation: The Myth of the Frontier in Twentieth-century America. University of Oklahoma Press. pp. 318–326. ISBN 978-0-8061-3031-6.
- Slotkin, Richard (Fall 2001). "Unit Pride: Ethnic Platoons and the Myths of American Nationality". American Literary History. 13 (3). Oxford University Press: 469–498. doi:10.1093/alh/13.3.469.
