= La Paloma (film) =

1959 film

- Directed by: Paul Martin
- Written by: Gustav Kampendonk
- Produced by: Artur Brauner; Horst Wendlandt
- Starring: Bibi Johns; Karlheinz Böhm; Harald Juhnke
- Cinematography: Richard Angst
- Edited by: Jutta Hering
- Music by: Erwin Halletz
- Production companies: CCC Film; Alfa Film
- Distributed by: Gloria Film
- Release date: 24 July 1959
- Running time: 95 minutes
- Country: West Germany
- Language: German

La Paloma is a 1959 West German musical film directed by Paul Martin and starring Bibi Johns, Karlheinz Böhm and Harald Juhnke. It takes its title from the traditional Spanish song "La Paloma". The film was shot at the Spandau Studios in West Berlin and on location in Lisbon. The sets were designed by the art directors Helmut Nentwig, Heinrich Weidemann and Paul Markwitz.

== Cast ==
- Bibi Johns as Birgit Nielsen
- Karlheinz Böhm as Robert Dahlberg
- Harald Juhnke as Peter
- Ruth Stephan as Fräulein Förster
- Rudolf Platte as Direktor Selten
- Hubert von Meyerinck as Direktor Bauer
- Wolfgang Wahl as Herr Haase
- Dany Mann as Sonny
- Harald Nielsen as Regisseur Fischer
- Ljuba Welitsch as Bette Maier
- Hans Olden as Regisseur Adler
- Elsa Wagner as Frau Walter
- Werner Fuetterer as Stefan Holden
- Anneliese Würtz as Fräulein Biermann
- Eleonore Tappert
- Gabriele as Sängerin
- Louis Armstrong as himself - Sänger
- Alice Kessler as Tänzerin
- Ellen Kessler as Tänzerin
- Ted Herold as Sänger
- Ralph Paulsen as Sänger
- Bill Ramsey as Sänger
- Jean Thomé as Sänger

== Bibliography ==
- Lutz Peter Koepnick. The Cosmopolitan Screen: German Cinema and the Global Imaginary, 1945 to the Present. University of Michigan Press, 2007.
