= Hello, Fraulein! =

1949 film directed by Rudolf Jugert

- Directed by: Rudolf Jugert
- Written by: Margot Hielscher; Helmut Weiss
- Starring: Margot Hielscher; Hans Söhnker; Peter van Eyck
- Cinematography: Georg Bruckbauer
- Edited by: Luise Dreyer-Sachsenberg
- Music by: Friedrich Meyer
- Production company: Bavaria Film
- Distributed by: Herzog Film
- Release date: 13 May 1949
- Running time: 84 minutes
- Country: West Germany
- Language: German

Hello, Fraulein! (German: Hallo, Fräulein!) is a 1949 German musical film directed by Rudolf Jugert and starring Margot Hielscher, Hans Söhnker and Peter van Eyck. It was made by the Munich-based company Bavaria Film in what would shortly become West Germany. It marked the German debut of van Eyck who had actually been born in Pomerania but had spent many years in the United States, leading him to be promoted in the film's publicity as an American actor.

The film's sets were designed by the art director Max Mellin. It was shot at the Bavaria Studios in Munich. The film's music combines elements of American big band jazz and German folk music.

== Synopsis ==
In Southern Germany in the months after the end of the Second World War, the commander of American forces occupying a German town tries to promote friendship with the locals by organising a musical show with the assistance of a female music student who has recently returned from entertaining German soldiers on the Eastern Front. By inviting a multi-national orchestra to perform, the two achieve greater international harmony although the student ultimately decides to marry a local architect rather than the American soldier.

== Cast ==
- Margot Hielscher as Maria Neubauer
- Hans Söhnker as Walter Reinhardt
- Peter van Eyck as Tom Keller
- Bobby Todd as Cesare
- Heidi Scharf as Renate
- Iska Geri as Grit
- Hannelore Bollmann as Herta
- Madelon Truß as Berta
- Werner Scharfenberger as Teddy
- Richard Bendig as Seppl
- Oliver Hassencamp as René
- Johannes Buzalski as Gabor
- Toni Thormal as Jan
- Jürgen Wulf as Hans
- Peter Fiedler as Fritz
- Panos Papadopulos as Musiker
- Freddie Brocksieper as Musiker
- Helmut Zacharias as Musiker
- Eberhard Keim as Musiker
- Cläre Ruegg as Frau Neuhaus
- Bob Norwood as Sergeant
- Franklie Clay as Sam
- Ingeborg Morawski as Frl. Senkpiel
- Petra Unkel as Roswitha
- Karl Schopp as Alois
- Thomas Quigley
- Bill Nuzun
- Gertrud Braun

== Bibliography ==
- Davidson, John & Hake, Sabine. Framing the Fifties: Cinema in a Divided Germany. Berghahn Books, 2007.
- Lutz Peter Koepnick. The Cosmopolitan Screen: German Cinema and the Global Imaginary, 1945 to the Present. University of Michigan Press, 2007.
