= Kenneth Spencer (singer) =

American opera singer (1913-1964)

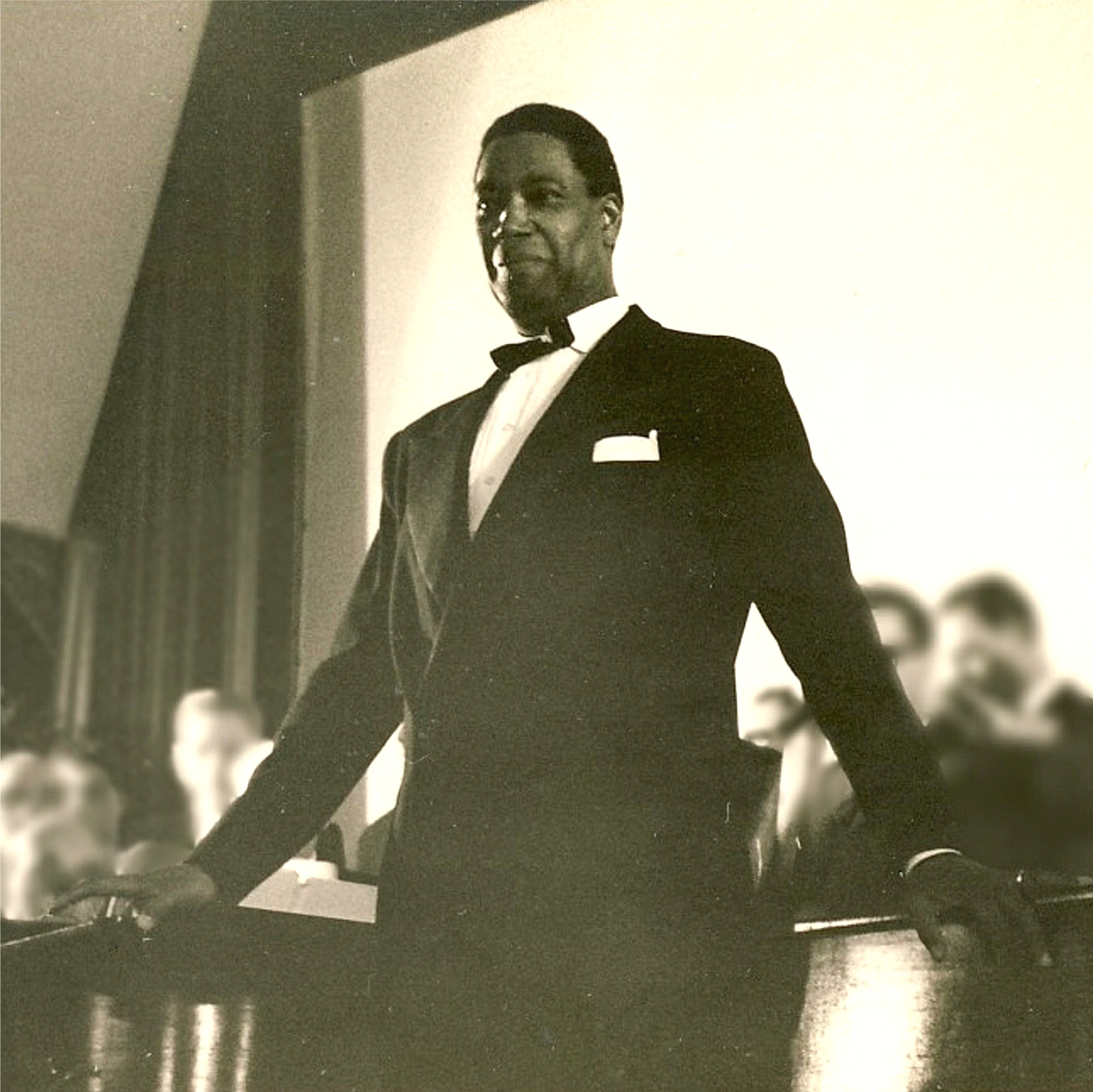
- Kenneth Spencer (c. 1960)

Background information
- Born: Kenneth Lee Spencer; April 25, 1913; Los Angeles, California, US
- Died: February 25, 1964 (aged 50) Lake Pontchartrain, Louisiana, US
- Genres: Opera, musical, folk, gospel
- Occupation: Singer
- Years active: 1930s–1964
- Website: kennethspencer.org

Kenneth Spencer (25 April 1913 – 25 February 1964), was an American operatic singer and actor. Spencer starred in a few Broadway musicals and musical films in the United States during the 1940s. Frustrated with the racial prejudice he experienced in the United States as a black man, Spencer moved to West Germany in 1950, where he had a successful singing career. He also appeared in a number of German films. His career was cut short when he died in the crash of Eastern Air Lines Flight 304.

== Life ==
Spencer was born in Los Angeles, California, the son of a steel worker. He took private vocal lessons while working as a gardener, and eventually caught the attention of the tenor Roland Hayes who helped him to get a scholarship at the Eastman School of Music. After graduating in 1938, Spencer tried to get a performing career going but met many obstacles due to racial prejudice in the United States.

In 1938 he sang in the Federal Music Project NBC Blue radio opera Gettysburg, first from El Capitan Theatre in Los Angeles, then at the Hollywood Bowl. In 1940 he was understudy for Paul Robeson in the short lived Broadway musical John Henry. This was followed by his professional recital debut in 1941 at New York City's Town Hall.

During the early 1940s Spencer made his first major successes in California as a concert artist at the Hollywood Bowl and as a radio performer. This led to his being cast in significant parts in two MGM films in 1943, the musical film Cabin in the Sky where he shared the screen with Ethel Waters, Lena Horne, Eddie "Rochester" Anderson, and Louis Armstrong, and the war movie Bataan. Spencer also sang offscreen the commenting ballad in A Walk in the Sun (1945). He returned to Broadway to portray Joe in the critically acclaimed 1946 revival of Kern and Hammerstein's Show Boat, in which he sang Ol' Man River. The revival was highly successful, running almost exactly a year, remarkable at the time for a revival of a play or musical. This was the first American production of Show Boat to receive a full-fledged Broadway cast album, rather than just a studio cast recording (there had been a British cast album in 1928). (Note: The Show Boat 1946 revival cast recording has two versions of "Ol' Man River" - one sung by Spencer (#4), the other by Paul Robeson (#13).)

In 1949 Spencer's life changed after performing in Europe for the first time at the International Music Festival in Nice. The European public responded with enthusiasm to his performance and he was soon getting offers to perform all over Europe. It was the first time that Spencer experienced a working environment and culture that was not hindered by racial prejudice. In 1950 he returned to Europe to sing in a number of radio broadcasts with the Radiodiffusion-Télévision Française and perform in several highly lauded concerts in Berlin, including performances with the Berlin Philharmonic. Spencer was so enamored with the German public and frustrated with the meager opportunities he found as a black artist in America that he moved his family to Wuppertal, West Germany in late 1950.

Spencer spent the next 14 years in Germany performing in concerts, operas, and plays. He also appeared in a few German films. His ability to perform not only Spirituals and classical music, but also folk songs in their original languages (French, German, Italian, Russian, Hebrew) won him much popularity in France and post-war Germany. He made a number of recordings with Columbia Masterworks Records during the 1950s and 1960s which consisted of classical music, spirituals, and folk songs.

Spencer died in the crash of Eastern Air Lines Flight 304. The plane crashed into Lake Pontchartrain after leaving the New Orleans International Airport on 25 February 1964.

== Filmography ==
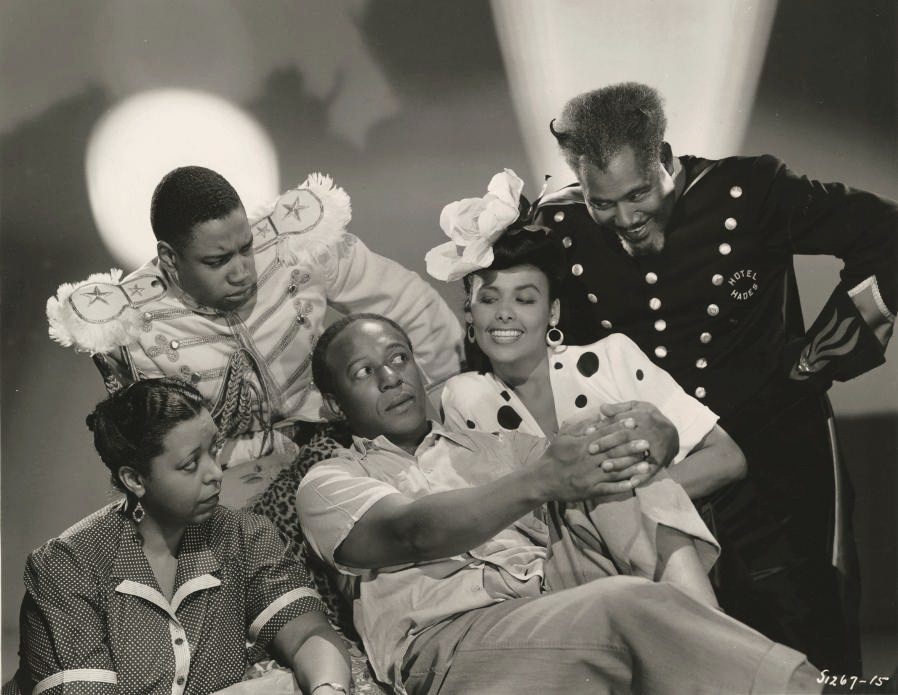
L–R: Ethel Waters, Kenneth Spencer, Eddie Anderson, Lena Horne, and Rex Ingram in Cabin in the Sky (1943)

Year	Title	Role	Notes
1943	Cabin in the Sky	The General / Rev. Green	
1943	Bataan	Wesley Epps	
1951	Les Joyeux Pèlerins	Kenneth	
1952	Dancing Stars	Singer	
1954	Ten on Every Finger	Okay	
1956	My Brother Joshua	Josua Washington Stone	
1957	Greetings and Kisses from Tegernsee	Jimmy	
1958	Meine schöne Mama	Jimmy	
1959	A Thousand Stars Aglitter	Sänger	
1961	Our House in Cameroon	Bismarck	(final film role)
