= The Juvenile Judge =

1960 film

- Directed by: Paul Verhoeven
- Written by: Hans Jacoby; István Békeffy
- Produced by: Kurt Ulrich
- Starring: Heinz Rühmann; Karin Baal; Lola Müthel
- Cinematography: Erich Claunigk
- Edited by: Hermann Haller
- Music by: Raimund Rosenberger
- Production company: Kurt Ulrich Filmproduktion
- Distributed by: UFA
- Release date: 11 February 1960
- Running time: 94 minutes
- Country: West Germany
- Language: German

The Juvenile Judge (German: Der Jugendrichter) is a 1960 West German drama film directed by Paul Verhoeven and starring Heinz Rühmann, Karin Baal and Lola Müthel.

It was shot at the Tempelhof Studios in Berlin.

== Main cast ==
- Heinz Rühmann as Judge Dr. Ferdinand Bluhme
- Karin Baal as Inge Schumann
- Lola Müthel as Elisabeth Winkler
- Hans Nielsen as District Court President Dr. Otto Schmittler
- Rainer Brandt as Kurt
- Michael Verhoeven as Alfred 'Fred' Kaiser
- Peter Thom as Willi Lenz
- Lore Schulz as Paula Burg
- Monika John as Marie the Maid
- Hans Epskamp as Senate President Dr. Hallmeier
- Erich Fiedler as Hans-Dieter Vogel, the Salesman
- Willi Rose as Judicial Officer
- Gerd Frickhöffer as Businessman Wellmann
- Harry Engel as 'Black Case' Peters

== Bibliography ==
- Reimer, Robert C. & Reimer, Carol J. The A to Z of German Cinema. Scarecrow Press, 2010.
