= Maria Sebaldt =

German actress (1930–2023)

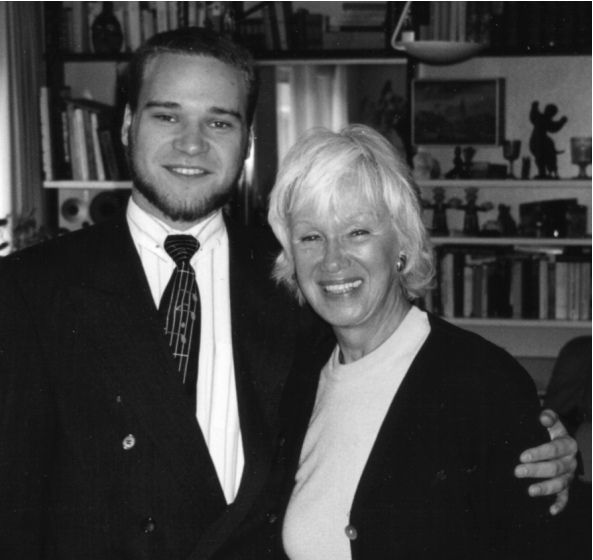
- Maria Sebaldt (right)
- Born: 26 April 1930; Steglitz, Berlin, Brandenburg, Prussia, Germany
- Died: 4 April 2023 (aged 92); Munich, Bavaria, Germany
- Occupation: Actress
- Spouse: Robert Freitag
- Children: Katharina Freitag

Maria Katharina Helene Sebaldt (26 April 1930 – 4 April 2023) was a German actress.

== Life ==
The daughter of a department head of the Paramount film distribution company took private acting lessons from 1946 to 1949 and passed an acting examination in 1951. As early as 1947 she made her stage debut in Sondershausen as Edeltraud Panse in Maximilian Böttcher's Krach im Hinterhaus. Numerous theater engagements followed, among others in Sondershausen, Berlin (Renaissance Theater, Theater Club British Center) and Munich.

From 1965 until his death in 2010, Maria Sebaldt was married to her colleague Robert Freitag. Together with Freitag's first wife, the actress Maria Becker, she created the cookbook Eat and Drink and Be Happy in 1997, Favorite dishes from Maria Becker & Maria Sebaldt.

Maria Sebaldt had a daughter, Katharina Freitag, and a grandson. She died in Munich on 4 April 2023, at the age of 92.

She was buried next to her husband in the Grünwald forest cemetery.

== Film ==
In 1953, Sebaldt made her film debut alongside Rudolf Prack in When The Village Music Plays on Sunday Nights. Since then, film and television have been her artistic focus. She played in music films like The Gypsy Baron, dramas like The Story of Anastasia (with Lilli Palmer in the title role), comedies like Helmut Käutner's The Zürich Engagement (with Lilo Pulver) and Father, Mother and Nine Children (with Heinz Erhardt), crime fiction like The Black Sheep after Gilbert Keith Chesterton (with Heinz Rühmann as Father Brown), and the gangster movie parody Oops, here's Eddie! (with Eddie Constantine ), westerns like Five Thousand Dollars on One Ace, and literary adaptations like Alfred Weidenmann's two-parter based on Thomas Mann's The Buddenbrooks and Helmut Käutner's adaptation of Carl Zuckmayer's The Captain from Köpenick. She often embodied sympathetic characters, but also cunning gangsters such as Virginia Peng in the real-life version of Manfred Schmidt's popular comic series Nick Knatterton.

== Television ==
Sebaldt also became popular through her roles in series such as Ich heirate eine Familie or as the caring Hannelore Wichert, which she embodied in the ZDF series Die Wicherts von nebenan between 1986 and 1991. In addition, she had numerous guest appearances in series such as Tatort, Das Traumschiff, Der Kommissar, Derrick and The Old Fox.

== Radio and voice acting ==
In addition, Sebaldt worked extensively for radio (NDR, RIAS, SFB), and was the German voice for internationally renowned actresses as Antonella Lualdi (The Red and the Black), Eva Marie Saint (A Hatful of Rain) and Joanne Woodward (Rally Round the Flag, Boys! and The Three Faces of Eve)

== Selected filmography ==
Additional films can be found on German and Swedish databases.

- Such a Charade (1953)
- Beloved Life (1953)
- Street Serenade (1953)
- The Stronger Woman (1953)
- When The Village Music Plays on Sunday Nights (1953)
- The Little Czar (1954)
- The Perfect Couple (1954)
- The Gypsy Baron (1954)
- A Girl Without Boundaries (1955)
- Alibi (1955)
- Father's Day (1955)
- Love Without Illusions (1955)
- Night of Decision (1956)
- The Story of Anastasia (1956)
- The Zurich Engagement (1957)
- Lemke's Widow (1957)
- A Woman Who Knows What She Wants (1958)
- Grabenplatz 17 (1958)
- Father, Mother and Nine Children (1958)
- Peter Shoots Down the Bird (1959)
- Nick Knatterton’s Adventure (1959)
- A Thousand Stars Aglitter (1959)
- I Learned That in Paris (1960)
- The Last of Mrs. Cheyney (1961)
- Barbara (1961)
- The Bird Seller (1962)
- Bekenntnisse eines möblierten Herrn (1963)
- Charley's Aunt (1963)
- A Mission for Mr. Dodd (1964)
- Five Thousand Dollars on One Ace (1965)
- Toutes griffes dehors (1982)
