= You Must Be Blonde on Capri =

- Directed by: Wolfgang Schleif
- Written by: Heinz-Werner John; Maria von der Osten-Sacken
- Produced by: Kurt Ulrich
- Starring: Karin Baal; Helmuth Lohner; Maurizio Arena
- Cinematography: Georg Bruckbauer
- Edited by: Ingrid Wacker
- Music by: Raimund Rosenberger
- Production company: Kurt Ulrich Film
- Distributed by: Europa-Filmverleih
- Release date: 31 August 1961
- Running time: 95 minutes
- Country: West Germany
- Language: German

You Must Be Blonde on Capri (German: Blond muß man sein auf Capri) is a 1961 West German comedy film directed by Wolfgang Schleif and starring Karin Baal, Helmuth Lohner and Maurizio Arena. It was shot at West Berlin's Tempelhof Studios and on location at Baden-Baden and Naples. The film's sets were designed by the art director Hans Kuhnert.

== Cast ==
- Karin Baal as Maria Gebhard
- Helmuth Lohner as Hannes Niklas
- Maurizio Arena as Roberto Calli
- Ruth Stephan as Lotte Jeschke
- Gunther Philipp as Eddi Schulze
- Nadja Regin as Helga Wagner
- Hans Nielsen as Bernard Wagner
- Alice Treff as Luise Niklas
- Karl Schönböck as Dr. Becker
- Inge Meysel as Elfriede Gebhard
- Walter Gross as Joseph Gebhard
- Ingrid Simon as Ursel
- Lore Schulz as Ellen
- Birgit Bergen as Erika
- Ruth Nimbach as Miss Krause
- Willi Rose as Fischer
- Ernst Fritz Fürbringer as von Straaten

== Bibliography ==
- Hans-Michael Bock and Tim Bergfelder. The Concise Cinegraph: An Encyclopedia of German Cinema. Berghahn Books, 2009.
- Axel Schildt & Detlef Siegfried. Between Marx and Coca-Cola: Youth Cultures in Changing European Societies, 1960-1980. Berghahn Books, 2006.
