= Charley's Aunt (1963 film) =

- DVD cover
- German: Charleys Tante
- Directed by: Géza von Cziffra
- Based on: Charley's Aunt by Brandon Thomas
- Produced by: Herbert Gruber
- Starring: Peter Alexander; Maria Sebaldt; Peter Vogel
- Cinematography: Willy Winterstein
- Edited by: Arnfried Heyne
- Music by: Johannes Fehring
- Production company: Sascha Film
- Distributed by: Constantin Film
- Release date: 20 September 1963
- Running time: 84 minutes
- Country: Austria
- Language: German

Charley's Aunt (German: Charleys Tante) is a 1963 Austrian comedy film directed by Géza von Cziffra and starring Peter Alexander, Maria Sebaldt and Peter Vogel. It is an adaptation of the 1892 British play Charley's Aunt by Brandon Thomas.

It was shot at the Rosenhügel Studios in Vienna. The film's sets were designed by the art directors Fritz Jüptner-Jonstorff and Alexander Sawczynski.

== Cast ==
- Peter Alexander as Doctor Otto Wilder
- Maria Sebaldt as Carlotta Ramirez
- Peter Vogel as Charley Sallmann
- Eike Pulver as Ulla Bergström
- Marlene Rahn as Britta Nielsen
- Alfred Böhm as Ralf Wilder
- Helli Servi as Mona
- Ljuba Welitsch as Frau Generalkonsul
- Rudolf Carl as Wolke
- Fritz Eckhardt as August Sallmann
- Johann Sklenka as Chauffeur Heinrich
- Hans Unterkircher as Generalkonsul
- Rudolf Vogel as Niels Bergström
