= The Muzzle (1958 film) =

1958 film

- Directed by: Wolfgang Staudte
- Written by: Heinrich Spoerl (play); Manfred Barthel; Eckart Hachfeld
- Produced by: Kurt Ulrich; Heinz Willeg
- Starring: O.E. Hasse; Hertha Feiler; Hansjörg Felmy
- Cinematography: Georg Bruckbauer
- Edited by: Ingrid Wacker
- Music by: Hans-Martin Majewski
- Production company: Kurt Ulrich Filmproduktion
- Distributed by: Europa-Filmverleih
- Release date: 18 September 1958
- Running time: 95 minutes
- Country: West Germany
- Language: German

The Muzzle (German: Der Maulkorb) is a 1958 West German comedy film directed by Wolfgang Staudte and starring O.E. Hasse, Hertha Feiler and Hansjörg Felmy. It is a remake of the 1938 film of the same title.

The film's sets were designed by the art directors Johannes Ott and Rolf Zehetbauer. It was shot at the Wandsbek Studios in Hamburg.

== Cast ==
- O.E. Hasse as Prosecutor Herbert von Treskow
- Hertha Feiler as Elisabeth von Treskow
- Hansjörg Felmy as Maler Georg Rabanus
- Corny Collins as Trude von Treskow
- Robert Meyn as Senior Prosecutor
- Edith Hancke as Billa
- Rudolf Platte as Kriminalkommissar Mühsam
- Ralf Wolter as Thürnagel
- Lotte Rausch as Frau Tigges
- Ernst Waldow as Gerichtsvorsitzender
- Erni Mangold as Gutsituierte Dame
- Franz-Otto Krüger as Schibulski
- Hans Richter as Maler Ali
- Wolfgang Neuss as Wilhelm Donnerstag
- Wolfgang Müller as Karl Schmidt
- Josef Albrecht as Kriegsminister
- Josef Dahmen as Bankier
- Walter Halden as Justizrat
- Kurt A. Jung as Redakteur Nelles
- Bruno Klockmann as Oberlehrer
- Kurt Klopsch as Kultusminister
- Ludwig Linkmann as Kanzler
- Ruth Lommel
- Karl-Heinz Peters as Innenminister
- Thomas Reiner as Stammgast bei Frau Tigges
- Vera Tschechowa
- Henry Vahl
- Ingrid van Bergen as Modell Mariechen
- Carl Voscherau as Arbeiter

== Bibliography ==
- Williams, Alan. Film and Nationalism. Rutgers University Press, 2002.
