= Ten on Every Finger =

1954 film directed by Erik Ode

- Directed by: Erik Ode
- Written by: Joachim Wedekind; Per Schwenzen; Hans Jacoby; Sarett Tobias
- Produced by: Peter Schaeffers
- Starring: Germaine Damar; Erich Auer; Loni Heuser
- Cinematography: Ekkehard Kyrath
- Edited by: Walter Wischniewsky
- Music by: Bobby Callazo; José Carbo Menendez
- Production company: Melodie Film
- Distributed by: Herzog Film
- Release date: 28 October 1954
- Running time: 104 minutes
- Country: West Germany
- Language: German

Ten on Every Finger (German: An jedem Finger zehn) is a 1954 West German musical comedy film directed by Erik Ode and starring Germaine Damar, Erich Auer and Loni Heuser. It was shot at the Spandau Studios in West Berlin and on location around the city. The film's sets were designed by the art directors Hans Kuhnert and Theo Zwierski. A musical revue film, it features many top entertainers of the era. It marked the penultimate screen appearance of American performer Josephine Baker.

== Cast ==
- Germaine Damar as Margit Rameau
- Erich Auer as Bert Martin
- Loni Heuser as Loni
- Walter Giller as Fips Kluger
- Bibi Johns as Biggy Nilsson
- Walter Gross as Kontrabassist Franz Hempel
- Werner Fuetterer as Gregor Bruchsal
- Detlev Lais as Self
- Kenneth Spencer as Okay
- Hubert von Meyerinck as Direktor des Lido
- Werner Kroll as Pensionswirt Kroll
- Cornelia Froboess as Cornelia
- Hans Albers as Self
- Mona Baptiste as Self
- Macky Kaspar as Trompeter Macky
- Josephine Baker as Josephine Baker
- Isa Günther as Frau im Publikum
- Jutta Günther as Frau im Publikum
- Ruth Stephan as Hans Albers' Sketchpartnerin
- Dina Gralla as Garderobiere Emma
- Claus Christofolini as Tänzer
- Helmut Zacharias as Self
- Rudolf Schock as Self
- William Webster Bailey as Mad Bishop
- Franz-Otto Krüger as Postbeamter
- Sunshine Quartett as Self
- Das Cornell-Trio a Self

== Bibliography ==
- Bock, Hans-Michael and Bergfelder, Tim. The Concise Cinegraph: An Encyclopedia of German Cinema. Berghahn Books, 2009.
- Lowe, Denise. An Encyclopedic Dictionary of Women in Early American Films: 1895-1930.
