= Franz-Otto Krüger =

German actor (1917–1988)

- Born: 1 April 1917; Berlin, German Empire
- Died: 17 March 1988 (aged 70); Munich, West Germany
- Years active: 1934–1987

Franz-Otto Krüger (1 April 1917 – 17 March 1988) was a German film and television actor. Krüger already started his acting at Berlin theatres in 1934, but his career was interrupted by his service in the Second World War. He appeared in over 125 film and television productions between 1947 and 1987, mostly in supporting roles. One of his first films was Roberto Rossellini's neorealist classic Germany, Year Zero.

In addition to acting, he also worked as a stage and television director in his later career. He was also employed as a voice actor and director of German dubbings. Krüger directed the German synchronisation versions of film classics like On the Waterfront, Bambi and The Great Dictator.

== Selected filmography ==
- No Place for Love (1947) - Der Sehnsüchtige
- Germany, Year Zero (1948) - Karl-Heinz
- Everything Will Be Better in the Morning (1948) - Dr. Linck, Dichter
- The Berliner (1948) - Einbrecher Franz
- Nothing But Coincidence (1949) - Herr Osterloh
- One Night Apart (1950) - Herr Schlüsemann
- The Woman from Last Night (1950)
- When Men Cheat (1950)
- The Black Forest Girl (1950) - Conférencier
- Queen of the Night (1951) - Ganove
- The Heath Is Green (1951) - Zauberkünstler
- The Prince of Pappenheim (1952) - Alfons
- Mikosch Comes In (1952) - Fotograf
- Oh, You Dear Fridolin (1952) - Rundfunkreporter
- Fight of the Tertia (1952) - Landrat Knötzinger
- When the Heath Dreams at Night (1952)
- The Rose of Stamboul (1953) - Oberkellner
- Such a Charade (1953) - Gersdorf, Versicherungsagent
- Lady's Choice (1953)
- Red Roses, Red Lips, Red Wine (1953)
- The Cousin from Nowhere (1953) - Onkel Gustav
- My Sister and I (1954) - Justizminister
- The Big Star Parade (1954) - Quick-Redakteur (uncredited)
- Ten on Every Finger (1954)
- Stern von Rio (1955)
- Heroism after Hours (1955) - Fink (segment "Der Zauberer Maro")
- Before God and Man (1955)
- Meine Kinder und ich (1955)
- Alibi (1955) - Vilessen (uncredited)
- Studentin Helene Willfüer (1956) - Arzt
- Ein Herz schlägt für Erika (1956)
- Die wilde Auguste (1956) - Gerichtsvollzieher
- Beichtgeheimnis (1956) - Vorsitzender
- The Model Husband (1956) - 1. Argentinier
- Du bist Musik (1956) - Manager
- Musikparade (1956) - Ramon Ramirez
- Ein Mann muß nicht immer schön sein (1956) - Michael Schöder
- Das Mädchen Marion (1956) - Der Fremde
- Saison in Oberbayern (1956) - v. Krachenfels
- Der Etappenhase (1957) - Intendantur-Rat Häberlein
- Salzburg Stories (1957) - Hotelmanager
- Victor and Victoria (1957) - Kriminalkommissar
- Tired Theodore (1957) - Professor Erwin Link
- Aunt Wanda from Uganda (1957) - Detektiv (uncredited)
- The Simple Girl (1957) - Regisseur
- Banktresor 713 (1957) - Personalchef
- Witwer mit 5 Töchtern (1957)
- Vater sein dagegen sehr (1957) - Standesbeamter
- Egon, der Frauenheld (1957)
- Kein Auskommen mit dem Einkommen (1957) - Herr Bollmann
- Voyage to Italy, Complete with Love (1958) - Herr Duevenasch
- Black Forest Cherry Schnapps (1958) - Polizeidirektor
- The Man Who Couldn't Say No (1958) - Kommisar Kümmelmann
- The Muzzle (1958) - Schibulski
- When She Starts, Look Out (1958) - Dirigent Erichsen (uncredited)
- The Crammer (1958) - Headmaster Gaspari
- Peter Voss, Thief of Millions (1958) - Uhl
- Bobby Dodd greift ein (1959)
- A Thousand Stars Aglitter (1959) - 1. Gläubiger (uncredited)
- An Angel on Wheels (1959) - Le dentiste
- Morgen wirst du um mich weinen (1959) - Angestellter
- Adorable Arabella (1959) - Herr Schnering
- Kein Engel ist so rein (1960) - Inspector
- The Avenger (1960) - Regie-Assistent Frankie
- We Will Never Part (1960) - Rosinelli
- Riviera Story (1961) - Müllerbeer
- The Bird Seller (1962) - Kommissar (uncredited)
- So toll wie anno dazumal (1962) - Kellner-Bewerber (uncredited)
- Kohlhiesel's Daughters (1962) - Portier Müller
- Lieder klingen am Lago Maggiore (1962) - Direktor Dietrich
- Zwei blaue Vergissmeinnicht (1962) - Cortini
- The Sky Is Blue (1964, TV film) - Maurice
- Ein Ferienbett mit 100 PS (1965) - Herr Krone
- The Gorilla of Soho (1968) - Police Doctor
- The Man with the Glass Eye (1969) - Hotel porter
- The Love Mad Baroness (1970) - Dr. Nagel
- The Eddie Chapman Story (1971, TV film) - Rechtsanwalt
- Gelobt sei, was hart macht (1972) - Nekeres (voice, uncredited)
- MitGift (1976) - Polo-Kommentator (voice, uncredited)
- Mr. Rossi Looks for Happiness (1976) - Puss in Boots (German version, voice, uncredited)
- Young Love: Lemon Popsicle 7 (1987) - Receptionist (voice, uncredited)
