= Helmut Zacharias =

German violinist (1920–2002)

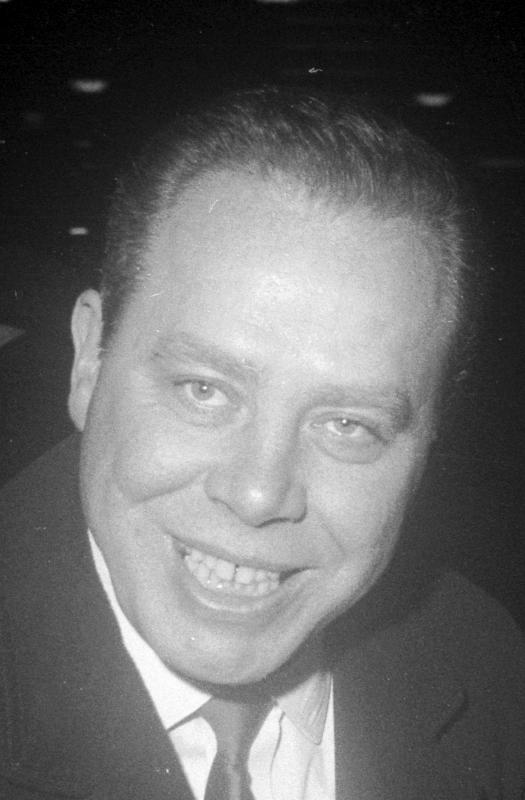
- Zacharias in 1965

Background information
- Also known as: Charly Thomas
- Born: 27 January 1920 Berlin, Germany
- Died: 28 February 2002 (aged 82) Brissago, Switzerland
- Genres: Classical, swing, jazz
- Occupation: Musician
- Instrument: Violin
- Years active: 1931–1990s
- Labels: Lindström-Electrola, EMI
- Website: www.helmutzacharias.site.ms

Helmut Zacharias (27 January 1920 – 28 February 2002) was a German violinist and composer who created over 400 works and sold 14 million records. He also appeared in a number of films, usually playing musicians.

== Early life ==
Helmut Zacharias was born in Berlin. His father Karl was a violinist and conductor, and his mother was a singer. He started having lessons from his father at the age of 2 and a half and at 6 he played at the Faun club, a cabaret venue on the Friedrichstraße in Berlin.

At the age of 8, Zacharias became the youngest student in Gustav Havemann's masterclass at the Berlin Academy of Music. Aged 11, he played on radio for the first time with a performance of Mozart's Violin Concerto No. 3 in G major and began touring in 1934 at the age of 14. At this time, in the 1930s, the records of Django Reinhardt and Stéphane Grappelli's all-string jazz band were available in Germany and they heavily influenced Zacharias's musical style.

== Musical career ==
In 1940, Zacharias was discovered by Lindström-Electrola (then-name of the German branch of EMI) and in 1941 had his first mainstream success with Schönes Wetter Heute. By the 1950s, he was considered to be one of the best jazz violinists of Europe and was dubbed "The Magic Violinist" and "Germany's Mr. Violin". In 1956 he achieved his greatest success in the United States with the release of "When the White Lilacs Bloom Again" which, on 22 September, reached number 12 on the Billboard Hot 100.

His version of the Swedish Midsummer night in Gotland (Gotländsk sommarnatt) was a bestseller in Sweden 1960 peaking at No. 7 on the trade magazine Show business sales list.

On 21 November 1964 he reached number 9 in the UK Singles Chart with Tokyo Melody following its use as theme music for the BBC's coverage of the 1964 Summer Olympics. Zacharias moved to Switzerland in the late 1950s and continued playing with many other famous artists, including Yehudi Menuhin. From 1968 to 1973 he appeared in his own television show. In 1985, he was awarded the Order of Merit of the Federal Republic of Germany.

== Death ==
Zacharias had been detected as suffering from Alzheimer's disease in 1995 and retired from public life in 1997 before the fact was publicly acknowledged on World Alzheimer's Day in 2000. He died in 2002 in Brissago, Switzerland and is buried in Ohlsdorf Cemetery in Hamburg.

== Personal life ==
Zacharias was married to Hella (née Konradat) from 1943 until his death. Together they had two sons, Stephan and Thomas, and a daughter, Sylvia. Stephan, born in 1956, is a composer whose credits include the soundtrack to Academy Award-nominated film Downfall, while Thomas was an international athlete.

== Discography ==
- 12 Violin Sonatas, Op.2 (Vivaldi) (1953)
- Ich liebe deinen Mund (1955)
- Hallo, Scandinavia (Polydor Records, 1958)
- Holiday in Spain (Polydor Records, 1959)
- Two Million Strings with Werner Müller (Decca Records, 1959)
- Songs of Old Russia (Polydor Records, 1959)
- Candelight Serenade (Polydor Records, 1960)
- The Best of Everything (Polydor Records; Themes rel. by Decca in US, 1961)
- A Violin Sings (Polydor Records, 1962)
- On Lovers' Road (Polydor Records, 1963)
- Pop Goes Baroque (RCA Victor, 1966)
- De Gouden Plaat Van Helmut Zacharias (Polydor Records, 1967)
- Happy Strings Happy Hits (Hör Zu, 1967)
- James Last Meets Helmut Zacharias (Polydor Records, 1967)
- For Lovers with Love (Columbia Records, 1968)
- Happy Strings of Zacharias (Hör Zu, 1968)
- Light My Fire (Sounds Superb, and MFP, 1968)
- Mexico Melody (Polydor Records, 1968)
- Zacharias Plays The Hits (Capitol Records in US, Columbia Records in Europe, 1969)
- Zacharias Plays Verdi & Puccini (Hör Zu, 1970)
- Zacharias Plays Verdi & Bizet (Hör Zu, 1970)
- Greatest Hits (Columbia Records, 1973)
- Buenos Días (Polydor and EMI Records, 1974)
- The Man With The Violin (EMI Records, 1975)
- Swinging Hits (EMI Records, 1977)
- Les Belles Années (Polydor, 1978)

== Filmography ==
Film
Year	Film	Role	Notes
1949	Hallo, Fräulein!	Musician	
1952	Homesick for You	Violinist	
1952	Queen of the Arena	Conductor	
1952	Eine nette Bescherung		TV movie
1953	Das singende Hotel	Karli Alten	
1954	Ten on Every Finger	Player	
1955	Wie werde ich Filmstar?		
1962	Toto's First Night		
1963	Jolanthe lässt bitten....	Himself	TV movie
1964	Silvester Show	Instrumentalist	TV movie
1966	Von uns – für Sie!		TV movie
1981	So schön wie heut', so müßt' es bleiben	Performer	TV movie
