= A Thousand Stars Aglitter =

1959 film

- Directed by: Harald Philipp
- Written by: Joachim Wedekind; Harald Philipp
- Produced by: Willy Zeyn
- Starring: Germaine Damar; Toni Sailer; Maria Sebaldt
- Cinematography: Heinz Hölscher
- Edited by: Elisabeth Kleinert-Neumann
- Production company: Willy Zeyn-Film
- Distributed by: Union-Film
- Release date: 13 August 1959
- Running time: 89 minutes
- Country: West Germany
- Language: German

A Thousand Stars Aglitter (German: Tausend Sterne leuchten) is a 1959 West German musical comedy film directed by Harald Philipp and starring Germaine Damar, Toni Sailer and Maria Sebaldt.

== Cast ==
- Germaine Damar as Patricia
- Toni Sailer as Robert Faber
- Maria Sebaldt as Margot
- Harald Juhnke as Axel Grenner Jr.
- Stanislav Ledinek as Direktor Bruchsal
- Alfred Balthoff as Axel Grenner Sr.
- Line Renaud as Juliette
- Chris Howland as Freddy
- Ady Berber as Marko
- Gerd Frickhöffer as Lefebvre, Regisseur
- Werner Fuetterer as Radioreporter
- Erich Dunskus as Direktor Fromme
- Ralf Bendix as Sänger
- Hans Blum as Sänger
- Heinz Schachtner as Trompeter
- Kenneth Spencer as Sänger
- John Schapar
- Rosemarie Renz
- Pia Trajuhn
- Jan Borall
- Anita von Ow
- Franz-Otto Krüger as 1. Gläubiger
- Kurt Waitzmann as 2. Gläubiger
- Ewald Wenck as 3. Gläubiger

== Bibliography ==
Lutz Peter Koepnick. The Cosmopolitan Screen: German Cinema and the Global Imaginary, 1945 to the Present. University of Michigan Press, 2007.
