= Gerd Frickhöffer =

German actor

- Born: 21 November 1913; Tianjin, China
- Died: 4 July 1980 (aged 66); Baden-Baden, Baden-Württemberg, West Germany
- Known for: Television actor

Gerd Frickhöffer (21 November 1913 – 4 July 1980) was a German film and television actor. He appeared as Captain Donvan in the television detective series Sergeant Berry.

== Selected filmography ==
- Chemistry and Love (1948)
- Everything Will Be Better in the Morning (1948)
- Das Mädchen Christine (1949)
- Nights on the Nile (1949)
- One Night Apart (1950)
- The Merry Wives of Windsor (1950)
- Veronika the Maid (1951)
- Professor Nachtfalter (1951)
- The Last Year (1951)
- The White Adventure (1952)
- Mikosch Comes In (1952)
- The Little Czar (1954)
- Clivia (1954)
- Emil and the Detectives (1954)
- Swelling Melodies (1955)
- Love Is Just a Fairytale (1955)
- Mamitschka (1955)
- Yes, Yes, Love in Tyrol (1955)
- Black Forest Melody (1956)
- The Old Forester House (1956)
- Victor and Victoria (1957)
- Majestät auf Abwegen (1958)
- Black Forest Cherry Schnapps (1958)
- The Csardas King (1958)
- A Woman Who Knows What She Wants (1958)
- That Won't Keep a Sailor Down (1958)
- A Thousand Stars Aglitter (1959)
- Old Heidelberg (1959)
- Glück und Liebe in Monaco (1959)
- The Juvenile Judge (1960)
- Man in the Shadows (1961)
- Adieu, Lebewohl, Goodbye (1961)
- The Sweet Life of Count Bobby (1962)
- The White Spider (1963)
- The Inn on Dartmoor (1964)
- Rampage at Apache Wells (1965)
- Dead Body on Broadway (1969)
- The Body in the Thames (1971)
- The Maddest Car in the World (1975)
