= Wilfried Seyferth =

- Born: 21 April 1908; Darmstadt, Hesse, German Empire
- Died: 9 October 1954 (aged 46); Wiesbaden, Hesse, West Germany
- Occupation: Actor
- Years active: 1933–1954
- Spouse(s): Eva Ingeborg Scholz (m. 1953–1954) (his death) (one child); Tatjana Iwanow; Irene Naef; Lu Säuberlich

Wilfried Seyferth (21 April 1908 – 9 October 1954) was a German actor, perhaps best known for Decision Before Dawn.

He was married four times, to four actresses, Eva Ingeborg Scholz, Tatjana Iwanow, Irene Naef and Lu Säuberlich. He died in a traffic accident on 9 October 1954 in Wiesbaden, Hesse.

== Partial filmography ==
- Tugboat M 17 (1933) - Jakob
- Under Blazing Heavens (1936) - Pop, Matrose
- Einmal werd' ich Dir gefallen (1938) - Rettich - sein Freund
- Skandal um den Hahn (1938) - Franz Langmann
- The Day After the Divorce (1938) - Max Pleschke, Angestellter bei Romberg
- By a Silken Thread (1938) - Verkäufer der Firma Hellwerth
- In the Name of the People (1939) - Sohn des bayerischen Holzschnitzers
- Salonwagen E 417 (1939) - Willy Fetthenne
- The Star of Rio (1940) - Journalist, Assistent von Herrn Hadrian
- Small Town Poet (1940) - Emil Kurz, Friseur
- The Swedish Nightingale (1941) - Hofjunker (China-Märchen)
- Destiny (1942) - Junger Kellner
- Rembrandt (1942) - Ulricus Vischer
- My Friend Josephine (1942) - Diener Oscar
- My Wife Theresa (1942) - Maler
- Die Wirtin zum Weißen Röß'l (1943) - Otto
- The Bath in the Barn (1943) - Jan, Amtsgehilfe
- Immensee (1943) - Werner, Musikstudent
- Leuchtende Schatten (1945)
- Der Fall Molander (1945)
- Ghost in the Castle (1947) - Willi Busse
- This Man Belongs to Me (1950) - Paul Fänger
- Everything for the Company (1950) - Peter Immermann
- When a Woman Loves (1950) - Konsul Brenkow
- Das seltsame Leben des Herrn Bruggs (1951) - Tonani - Konzert-Agent
- Decision Before Dawn (1951) - Heinz Scholtz - SS Man
- Toxi (1952) - Theodor Jenrich
- The Devil Makes Three (1952) - Hansig
- Homesick for You (1952) - Vicky Hanke
- The Merry Vineyard (1952) - Gustav Knuzius
- Mask in Blue (1953) - Orgando, Manager
- Dutch Girl (1953) - Quietsch
- A Musical War of Love (1953) - Generaldirektor Rabenfuß
- Southern Nights (1953) - Zaccarella
- The Dancing Heart (1953) - Leopold
- The Charming Young Lady (1953) - Felix Bernard
- Men at a Dangerous Age (1954) - Adam Kassner (Dichter)
- The Man of My Life (1954) - Dr. Nörenberg
- Roses from the South (1954) - Pierre
- A House Full of Love (1954) - Remming
- Ein toller Tag (1954) - Basilio, music teacher
- 08/15 (1954) - Major Luschke
- Hoheit lassen bitten (1954) - Landrat von Wahlegg
- The Golden Plague (1954) - Wenzeslaw Kolowrat
- Secrets of the City (1955) - Ein Fremder (final film role)
