= Love Is Just a Fairytale =

1955 film directed by Arthur Maria Rabenalt

- Directed by: Arthur Maria Rabenalt
- Written by: Gustav Kampendonk; Felix Lützkendorf
- Starring: Willy Fritsch; Georges Guétary; Claude Farell
- Cinematography: Bruno Mondi
- Edited by: Hermann Leitner
- Music by: Hans Carste; Willy Mattes
- Production company: Berolina Film
- Distributed by: Constantin Film
- Release date: 16 December 1955
- Running time: 97 minutes
- Country: West Germany
- Language: German

Love Is Just a Fairytale (German: Liebe ist ja nur ein Märchen) is a 1955 West German musical comedy film directed by Arthur Maria Rabenalt and starring Willy Fritsch, Georges Guétary and Claude Farell.

The film's sets were designed by the art director Hans Kuhnert. It was made at the Tempelhof Studios in Berlin and on location around Athens. It was shot in Agfacolor.

== Cast ==
- Willy Fritsch as Dr. Lindenberg
- Georges Guétary as Mario, Sänger
- Eva Crüwell as Helga Lindenberg
- Gerhard Riedmann as Dr. Klaus Weinert
- Claude Farell as Angela Brinkmann
- Lucie Englisch as Berta
- Christiane Kubrick as Jou-Jou
- Hans Richter as Fritz Keller
- Friedl Hardt as Viola Kern
- Gerd Frickhöffer as Beckers, Manager
- Noëlle Norman as Singer

== Bibliography ==
- Bock, Hans-Michael; Bergfelder, Tim, eds. (2009). The Concise Cinegraph: Encyclopaedia of German Cinema. New York: Berghahn Books. ISBN 978-1-57181-655-9.
