= Black Forest Cherry Schnapps =

1958 film directed by Géza von Bolváry

- Directed by: Géza von Bolváry
- Written by: Gustav Kampendonk
- Produced by: Kurt Ulrich; Heinz Willeg
- Starring: Marianne Hold; Dietmar Schönherr; Boy Gobert
- Cinematography: Georg Bruckbauer
- Edited by: Ingrid Wacker
- Music by: Lotar Olias
- Production company: Kurt Ulrich Filmproduktion
- Distributed by: Bavaria Film
- Release date: 1 August 1958
- Running time: 90 minutes
- Country: West Germany
- Language: German

Black Forest Cherry Schnapps (German: Schwarzwälder Kirsch) is a 1958 West German comedy film directed by Géza von Bolváry and starring Marianne Hold, Dietmar Schönherr and Boy Gobert. It was shot in Agfacolor at the Tempelhof Studios in West Berlin and on location around Wiesental. The film's sets were designed by the art director Hans Kuhnert. It was part of the tradition of Heimatfilm, popular in the postwar era. The title refers to Kirsch, the popular drink.

== Synopsis ==
The composer Peter is on the way to a in a music festival to be honoured in the Black Forest, but due to an error he and his lyricist friend are mistaken as vagrants and imprisoned. Meanwhile two real tramps steal their papers and pose as the celebrated musicians, causing havoc.

== Cast ==
- Marianne Hold as Angela Westmann
- Dietmar Schönherr as Peter Benrath
- Boy Gobert as Freddy Weller
- Edith Hancke as Jette Palm
- Wolfgang Neuss as Egon
- Wolfgang Müller as Otto
- Willy Reichert as Herr Räuschle
- Helen Vita as Lorle
- Franz-Otto Krüger as Polizeidirektor
- Willy Rösner as Gastwirt
- Kurt Zehe as Großer Hotelangestellter
- Rolf Pinegger as Hansl, Hotellehrling
- Gerd Frickhöffer as Direktor Alfred Krone
- Willy Fritsch as Arthur Altenberg

== Bibliography ==
- Bock, Hans-Michael & Bergfelder, Tim. The Concise CineGraph. Encyclopedia of German Cinema. Berghahn Books, 2009.
- Höbusch, Harald. "Mountain of Destiny": Nanga Parbat and Its Path Into the German Imagination. Boydell & Brewer, 2016.
- Ludewig, Alexandra. Screening Nostalgia: 100 Years of German Heimat Film. transcript Verlag, 2014.
