= Count Bobby =

Fictional Viennese comic figure

Count Bobby (German: Graf Bobby) is a fictional Viennese comic figure, originating as the subject of a traditional joke cycle. Graf Bobby is a refined aristocrat who finds everyday events incomprehensible and speaks in a bland, monotone voice. Many of the jokes about Count Bobby also feature his friend Baron Rudi (or Mucki), who is a little more versed in the ways of the actual world, more energetic and a little brighter, and thus the perfect foil for Bobby. Their stories range from the silly to the downright philosophical.

In the early 1950s these jokes were collected in anthologies, and later he was the main character in a number of films, played by Peter Alexander.

Doctor Hans Asperger compared one of his patients to the character and it is theorized the character is partially based on real life autistic people.

Both Count Bobby and Baron Rudi are a little remote from daily life; their education is somewhat problematic; their intellectual abilities are only so-so, but their manners are impeccable. Both have a hard time making ends meet, but are motivated by noblesse oblige. They speak in a slightly bored inflection in a nasal Viennese dialect known as Schönbrunnerdeutsch, or German as spoken at the Habsburg Imperial Court at Schönbrunn.

== Films ==
- 1961: The Adventures of Count Bobby (Director: Geza von Cziffra)

Count Bobby (Peter Alexander) has a big castle but no money, that's why he has to play the entertainer for some tourists, who want to visit his castle. Finally he sees an opportunity to gain some money, but his aunt gets ill, so he has to dress himself as a woman in order to accompany the millionaire's daughter Mary during her voyage through Europe. But he hasn't thought about Baron Mucki (Gunther Philipp), who has been engaged as a private detective by Mary's father...

- 1962: The Sweet Life of Count Bobby (Director: Geza von Cziffra)

Count Bobby and Baron Mucki are working together as private detectives, but they aren't very successful. Suddenly they get hired to investigate the disappearance of some girls in southern Europe. That's why they have to dress as women. Count Bobby becomes the chief woman of a dancing group. When they make a tour through the Atlantic Ocean he recognizes that he is in deep trouble.

- 1966: Count Bobby, The Terror of The Wild West (Director: Paul Martin)

Count Bobby gets to know that his uncle from Arizona has died. He journeys to Arizona because he wants to inspect his new possessions, but Doc Harper is after the Count's new house. Bobby and Mucki have to defend themselves with guns and roses.
