= Request Concert =

1955 film directed by Erik Ode

- Directed by: Erik Ode
- Written by: Gunther Philipp; Aldo von Pinelli
- Produced by: Herbert Sennewald
- Starring: Germaine Damar; Georg Thomalla; Renate Holm
- Cinematography: Günther Senftleben
- Edited by: Klaus Dudenhöfer
- Music by: Heino Gaze; Erwin Halletz
- Production company: Herzog Film
- Distributed by: Herzog Film
- Release date: 8 September 1955
- Running time: 95 minutes
- Country: West Germany
- Language: German

Request Concert (German: Wunschkonzert) is a 1955 West German musical comedy film directed by Erik Ode and starring Germaine Damar, Georg Thomalla and Renate Holm. It was shot at the Bendestorf Studios and on location in nearby Hamburg. The film's sets were designed by the art directors Max Mellin and Wolf Englert.

== Cast ==
- Georg Thomalla as Willy Vogel
- Germaine Damar as Inge
- Renate Holm as Renate Holm
- Paul Dahlke as Knoll
- Bully Buhlan as Bully Buhlan
- Walter Gross as Lüdecke
- Peter W. Staub as Fireman, guitarist
- Harald Juhnke as Horn
- Peer Schmidt as Ad man, pianist
- Macky Kaspar as Brown, trumpeter
- Kurt Vespermann as Steinberg
- Erica Beer as Knoll's wife
- Inge Meysel as Cleaning lady
- Linda Caroll as Knoll's mistress
- Josef Dahmen as Fire chief
- Peter Frankenfeld as Peter Frankenfeld

== Bibliography ==
- Manfred Hobsch. Liebe, Tanz und 1000 Schlagerfilme. Schwarzkopf & Schwarzkopf, 1998.
