= The Old Forester House =

1956 film

- Directed by: Harald Philipp
- Written by: Harald Philipp; Werner P. Zibaso
- Produced by: Artur Brauner
- Starring: Paul Klinger; Anita Gutwell; Trude Hesterberg
- Cinematography: Herbert Thallmayer
- Edited by: Walter Boos
- Music by: Klaus Ogermann
- Production company: Wega-Film
- Release date: 21 December 1956
- Running time: 92 minutes
- Country: West Germany
- Language: German

The Old Forester House (German: Das alte Försterhaus) is a 1956 West German comedy drama film directed by Harald Philipp and starring Paul Klinger, Anita Gutwell and Trude Hesterberg. It was part of the post-war cycle of heimatfilm.

The film's sets were designed by Mathias Matthies.

== Cast ==
- Paul Klinger as Paul Kramer
- Anita Gutwell as Helga Imhoff
- Trude Hesterberg as Emilie Kramer
- Joseph Egger as Josef Kramer
- Ursula Herking as Ursel Zander
- Gerty Godden as Fräulein Bressel
- Kurt Großkurth as Herr Engel
- Fritz Wagner as Direktor Hardt
- Gerd Frickhöffer as Kellner Otto
- Karl Bayer as Kellner Fritz
- Ulli von Berg as Frank Kramer, Paul Kramers Sohn
- Dolores Ling as Luise
- Robert Fackler as Julius
- Ralf Wolter as Max
- Max Greger as Max Greger und sein Orchester
- Jimmy Makulis as Sänger, himself
- Stan Oliver as Sänger, himself
- Olive Moorefield as Sängerin, herself
- Fred Rauch as Fernsehansager & Sänger, himself
- Tommy Albertus as Solo-Tänzer, himself
- John Schapar as Solo-Tänzer, himself

== Bibliography ==
- Davidson, John & Hake, Sabine. Framing the Fifties: Cinema in a Divided Germany. Berghahn Books, 2007.
