= Aldo von Pinelli =

Italian screenwriter, lyricist and film producer

- Born: 11 September 1913; Cervara di Roma, Lazio, Kingdom of Italy
- Died: 18 December 1967 (aged 54); Munich, Bavaria, West Germany
- Occupations: Writer, Producer
- Years active: 1935–1967 (film)

Aldo von Pinelli (1913–1967) was an Italian screenwriter, lyricist and film producer.

== Selected filmography ==
- Lessons in Love (1935)
- Cause for Divorce (1937)
- A Girl from the Chorus (1937)
- The Missing Wife (1937)
- The Singing House (1948)
- No Sin on the Alpine Pastures (1950)
- Homesick for You (1952)
- Southern Nights (1953)
- Hit Parade (1953)
- The First Kiss (1954)
- Request Concert (1955)
- The Big Chance (1957)
- Escape from Sahara (1958)
- Freddy, the Guitar and the Sea (1959)
- Conny and Peter Make Music (1960)
- Freddy and the Melody of the Night (1960)
- One Prettier Than the Other (1961)
- Congress of Love (1966)
- Zärtliche Haie (1967)

== Bibliography ==
- Fritsche, Maria. Homemade Men in Postwar Austrian Cinema: Nationhood, Genre and Masculinity. Berghahn Books, 2013.
