= The Legs of Dolores =

1957 film

- Directed by: Géza von Cziffra
- Written by: Géza von Cziffra
- Produced by: Kurt Ulrich
- Starring: Germaine Damar; Claus Biederstaedt; Ruth Stephan
- Cinematography: Georg Bruckbauer
- Edited by: Ingrid Wacker
- Music by: Michael Jary
- Production company: Kurt Ulrich Filmproduktion
- Distributed by: Constantin Film
- Release date: 18 November 1957
- Running time: 105 minutes
- Country: West Germany
- Language: German

The Legs of Dolores (German: Die Beine von Dolores) is a 1957 West German musical comedy film directed by Géza von Cziffra and starring Germaine Damar, Claus Biederstaedt, and Ruth Stephan. It was shot at the Wandsbek Studios in Hamburg. The film's sets were designed by the art directors Dieter Bartels and Theo Zwierski.

== Cast ==
- Germaine Damar as Dolores Martens, Tänzerin
- Claus Biederstaedt as Dr. Hans Lorenz
- Ruth Stephan as Auguste Link, Chefin des "Pigalle"
- Theo Lingen as Theobald Schreyer, Finanzier
- Gunther Philipp
- Bum Krüger as Adalbert Martens, Vater von Dolores
- Ralf Wolter as Mecki Wenzel, ein Alles-Könner
- Bobby Todd as Herr Lehmann, Sektfabrikant
- Lotte Rausch as Hildegard Lehmann, seine Gattin
- Waltraut Runze as Schwester Elvira
- Hans Schwarz Jr. as 1. Pfleger in der Klinik
- Karin Faber as Betty Haas, Tänzerin
- Grethe Weiser as Martha Martens, Mutter von Dolores
- Lys Assia as Sängerin
- René Carol as Sänger
- Betty Miller as Sängerin
- Peters Sisters as Sängerinnen
- Olive Moorefield as Sängerin
- Owen William as Sänger
- Christa Williams as Sängerin
- Udo Jürgens as Sänger
- Die Penny Pipers as Gesangsgruppe
- Die Starletts as Gesangsgruppe
- Renée Franke as Singer, Bimmelbahn Boogie
- Detlev Lais as Singer

== Bibliography ==
- Schindler, Stephan K.; Koepnick, Lutz, eds. (2007). The Cosmopolitan Screen: German Cinema and the Global Imaginary, 1945 to the Present. Ann Arbor: University of Michigan Press. ISBN 978-0-472-06966-8.
