= Bully Buhlan =

German musician and actor

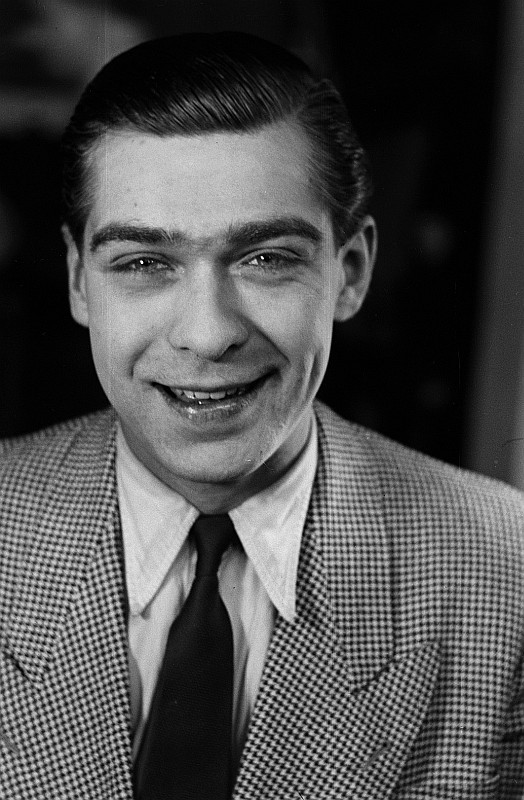
- Buhlan in 1946
- Born: 3 February 1924; Lichterfelde, Berlin, Germany
- Died: 7 November 1982 (aged 58); West Berlin, West Germany
- Other name: Hans Joachim Buhlan
- Occupations: Singer, musician, actor

Bully Buhlan (3 February 1924 – 7 November 1982) was a German musician. He was also an actor known for Königin der Arena (1952), Die große Starparade (1954) and Sag' die Wahrheit (1946).

== Filmography ==
Year	Title	Role	Notes
1946	Tell the Truth	Singer	
1950	Three Girls Spinning	Singer	
1952	The Chaste Libertine	Singer	
1952	Homesick for You	Singer	
1952	Queen of the Arena	Singer	
1953	The Singing Hotel	Tommy Olsen	
1953	The Bogeyman		
1953	Ein tolles Früchtchen	Gunar	
1953	Hit Parade	Max Balduweit	
1954	The Abduction of the Sabine Women	Charly Gross	
1954	The Telephone Operator	Bobby	
1954	The Big Star Parade	Himself	
1955	How Do I Become a Film Star?		
1955	Request Concert		
1956	Ich und meine Schwiegersöhne	Theo Brockmann	
1956	Mädchen mit schwachem Gedächtnis	Billy Turner	
1956	Emperor's Ball	Graf Baranyi	
1960	Marina	Peter Hiller	
1971	...und heute heißt es Show	Singer	

== Death ==
Bully Buhlan died on November 7, 1982 in West Berlin after suffering a heart attack.

== Bibliography ==
- Barnett, David. A History of the Berliner Ensemble. Cambridge University Press, 2015.
