= Peter Alexander (Austrian performer) =

Austrian actor

- Born: Peter Alexander Ferdinand Maximilian Neumayer; 30 June 1926; Vienna, Austria
- Died: 12 February 2011 (aged 84); Vienna, Austria
- Occupations: Actor, singer
- Years active: 1948–1996

Peter Alexander Ferdinand Maximilian Neumayer (30 June 1926 – 12 February 2011), commonly known as Peter Alexander, was an Austrian actor, singer and one of the most popular entertainers in the German-language world between the 1950s and his retirement. His fame emerged in the 1950s and 1960s through popular film comedies and successful recordings, predominantly of Schlager and operetta repertory. Later, Alexander established himself as the acclaimed host of television shows. His career as a live singer touring the German language countries lasted until 1991, while he continued his television work until 1996.

== Life and career ==
Born in Vienna, Alexander attended the Max Reinhardt Seminar for actors until 1948 and then began his career in acting. He starred in several musical comedies, including Liebe, Tanz und 1000 Schlager and Peter schießt den Vogel ab. He recorded Ralph Benatzky's operetta Im weißen Rößl, singing the lead role of Leopold Brandmeyer. He then performed in the 1960 movie version of the operetta. He later starred in the Count Bobby movies and the Lümmel-series.

In the 1970s, Alexander started a second career as a TV host and entertainer. His music show, the Peter Alexander Show, was shown on black and white TV from 1963 until 1966. From 1969, the German TV station ZDF started to air a new colour version which was broadcast until 1996. The Peter Alexander Show has been seen by more than 38 million viewers and has averaged a 71% viewing rate.

After his death, Media Control Charts named him the biggest singles artist ever with 459 songs having charted on the German singles chart. The single "Und manchmal weinst du sicher ein paar Tränen" had the longest run with 34 weeks on that chart, while 2 other songs, "Der letzte Walzer" and "Liebesleid", were able to reach the No. 1 position. Alexander won 10 Bambi Awards and in 1996 was awarded a Bambi for lifetime achievement.

Alexander married Hilde Haagen in 1952; they had two children, Susanne Neumayer-Haidinger (1958–2009), an artist, and Michael Neumayer (1963–2019). Alexander was widowed in 2003.

Alexander died on 12 February 2011, aged 84, in his native Vienna.

== Filmography ==
Year	Film	Director	Role
1948	Der Engel mit der Posaune	Karl Hartl	Visitor
1952	Vanished Melody	Eduard von Borsody	Piano player
1952	Queen of the Arena	Rolf Meyer	Singer
1953	Salto Mortale	Victor Tourjansky	Singer
1953	The Sweetest Fruits	Franz Antel	Singer
1953	Drei, von denen man spricht	Axel von Ambesser	
1954	Verliebte Leute	Franz Antel	Musician Karl Munk
1954	The Big Star Parade	Paul Martin	Singer
1955	Love, Dance and a Thousand Songs	Paul Martin	Singer Peter Alexander
1956	Musikparade	Géza von Cziffra	Singer Peter Martin
1956	Bonjour Kathrin	Karl Anton	Music student Pierre
1956	Ein Mann muß nicht immer schön sein	Hans Quest	Jazz singer Peter Moll
1957	Liebe, Jazz und Übermut	Erik Ode	Jazz singer Peter Hagen
1957	Das haut hin	Géza von Cziffra	Student, artist and singer Toni Matthis
1957	Die Beine von Dolores	Géza von Cziffra	Singer (uncredited)
1958	Munchhausen in Africa	Werner Jacobs	Music teacher Peter von Münchhausen
1958	When She Starts, Look Out	Géza von Cziffra	Jazz musician Peter Holunder
1958	So ein Millionär hat's schwer	Géza von Cziffra	Millionaire's Heir Edward Collins
1959	Peter Shoots Down the Bird	Géza von Cziffra	Porter Peter Schatz
1959	Schlag auf Schlag	Géza von Cziffra	Registrar Hugo Bartels
1959	Ich bin kein Casanova	Géza von Cziffra	Student and butler Peter Keller
1959	Salem Aleikum aka: Mein ganzes Leben ist Musik	Géza von Cziffra	Teacher and amateur musician Peter Karmann
1960	Kriminaltango	Géza von Cziffra	Houseowner Peter Martens
1960	Yes, Women are Dangerous	Paul Martin	Fashion designer Peter Hollmann
1960	The White Horse Inn	Werner Jacobs	Head waiter Leopold Brandmeyer
1961	Season in Salzburg aka: Wenn der Toni mit der Vroni	Franz Josef Gottlieb	Waiter Heinz Doll
1961	The Adventures of Count Bobby	Géza von Cziffra	Count Bobby (Robert) Pinelski
1962	Die Fledermaus	Géza von Cziffra	Dr. Gabriel Eisenstein
1962	The Merry Widow	Werner Jacobs	Danilo
1962	Wedding Night in Paradise	Paul Martin	Operetta star Dr. Ulrich Hansen
1962	The Sweet Life of Count Bobby	Géza von Cziffra	Count Bobby (Robert) Pinelski
1963	Charley's Aunt	Géza von Cziffra	Diplomat Dr. Otto Wilder
1963	The Model Boy	Werner Jacobs	CEO Dr. Fritz Geyer
1963	Schweik's Awkward Years	Wolfgang Liebeneiner	Josef Schwejk
1964	Help, My Bride Steals	Werner Jacobs	Commercial artist Valentin Haase
1964	In Bed by Eight	Werner Jacobs	Teacher Dr. Eduard Frank
1965	Who Wants to Sleep?	Axel von Ambesser; Rolf Thiele; Alfred Weidenmann	Peter Sommer
1966	Count Bobby, The Terror of The Wild West	Paul Martin	Count Bobby (Robert) Pinelski
1966	How to Seduce a Playboy	Michael Pfleghar	Peter Knolle
1968	Zum Teufel mit der Penne; Part #2 of the series: Die Lümmel von der ersten Bank	Werner Jacobs	TV reporter Dr. Peter Roland, Substitute teacher Dr. Wilhelm-Maria Tell
1969	Hurra, die Schule brennt! Part #4 of the series: Die Lümmel von der ersten Bank	Werner Jacobs	Teacher Dr. Peter Bach
1972	Hauptsache Ferien	Peter Weck	Teacher Dr. Peter Markus

== Decorations and awards ==
- Grand Decoration of Honour for Services to the Republic of Austria (1985)
- Austrian Cross of Honour for Science and Art, 1st class (1974)
- Ring of honour of Vienna (1984)
- Golden Camera (1970, 1980, 1984 (Germany); 1979 (Austria)) as the best music star of a decade
- Super Golden Camera 1979 (Germany) as the biggest star of all time, with participation of over 11 million readers of Hörzu
- Bambi Award (1970, 1971, 1972, 1973, 1974, 1977, 1978, 1987, 1990; 1996 for his lifetime achievement)
- Golden Europe (1969, 1974, 1979)
- Goldener Bildschirm (1966, 1973, 1974 and 1976); Silberner Bildschirm (1970 and 1971)
- Bronze Bravo Otto (1971)
- Gold Decoration for Services to the City of Vienna (1971)
- Lion of RTL Radio, a total of 9 prizes in bronze, silver and gold (1973)
- Honorary Lion as the best singer
- Golden Microphone (1966) for best male music star in European show business
- Rose Hill award (1992) for having written Austrian film history
- Award of the City of Cologne (1976) for 14 completely sold-out events at the Cologne Sporthalle
- Hermann Löns Gold Medal
- Golden Romy (1992)
- Platinum Romy (1993)
- Other awards were: Lieber Augustin of Vienna (1968), the Golden Bear (1973), Golden Rathausmann (1970), Golden Plate of German gastronomy (1973), Golden Cleo as the most popular star in Austria (1986), German Record Award (1980), Silver Plate of Robert Stolz Foundation in (1980)
- 4th place in the list of the 50 most important Austrians of the last 50 years in a reader poll of the daily Kurier (2004)
- Induction into the Echo Hall of Fame (2011)
- Naming of Peter-Alexander-Platz in Döbling (19th district of Vienna, 2012)

== Bibliography ==
- Michael Wenk & Barbara Loehr: Peter Alexander – Das tat ich alles aus Liebe. Wien: Ueberreuter, 2006 (ISBN 978-3800071814)
- "Peter Alexander" entry, German version of Microsoft Encarta Encyclopedia 2005.
