= Raisner =

Raisner is a surname. Notable people with the surname include:

- Albert Raisner (1922–2011), French harmonica player
- Craig Raisner (1961–2018), American voice actor, composer, writer and film/television producer
- Kim Raisner (born 1972), German modern pentathlete and coach

== See also ==
- Rainer (surname)
