= Herzog Film =

German film company

Herzog Film (German: Herzog Filmverleih) was a German film distribution company active in West Germany during the postwar era. In the Nazi era the release of films had been heavily centralised, but during the Allied occupation new distributors began to spring up across the country as the film industry gradually recovered. Herzog was based in Munich rather than Berlin which had historically dominated German cinema. One of the company's most notable releases was the controversial 1951 film The Sinner. It also released Austrian productions in the West German market.

== Selected filmography ==
- Tell the Truth (1946)
- And If We Should Meet Again (1947)
- Everything Will Be Better in the Morning (1948)
- Film Without a Title (1948)
- Nora's Ark (1948)
- The Time with You (1948)
- By a Nose (1949)
- Derby (1949)
- Second Hand Destiny (1949)
- Hello, Fraulein! (1949)
- The Last Night (1949)
- Nights on the Nile (1949)
- Nothing But Coincidence (1949)
- My Wife's Friends (1949)
- The Trip to Marrakesh (1949)
- The Black Forest Girl (1950)
- Doctor Praetorius (1950)
- Farewell Mister Grock (1950)
- My Niece Susanne (1950)
- Theodore the Goalkeeper (1950)
- When a Woman Loves (1950)
- Who Is This That I Love? (1950)
- Wedding Night in Paradise (1950)
- Hanna Amon (1951)
- The Sinner (1951)
- The Csardas Princess (1951)
- The House in Montevideo (1951)
- Immortal Beloved (1951)
- Miracles Still Happen (1951)
- Sensation in San Remo (1951)
- Cuba Cabana (1952)
- Dancing Stars (1952)
- The Land of Smiles (1952)
- The Imaginary Invalid (1952)
- Mikosch Comes In (1952)
- Homesick for You (1952)
- Knall and Fall as Imposters (1952)
- Queen of the Arena (1952)
- Towers of Silence (1952)
- Vanished Melody (1952)
- Annaluise and Anton (1953)
- Dutch Girl (1953)
- Knall and Fall as Detectives (1953)
- Hocuspocus (1953)
- Hit Parade (1953)
- Mailman Mueller (1953)
- Mask in Blue (1953)
- Southern Nights (1953)
- When the White Lilacs Bloom Again (1953)
- Emil and the Detectives (1954)
- The First Kiss (1954)
- Prisoners of Love (1954)
- Ten on Every Finger (1954)
- She (1954)
- The Faithful Hussar (1954)
- On the Reeperbahn at Half Past Midnight (1954)
- The Heroes Are Tired (1955)
- Hotel Adlon (1955)
- Request Concert (1955)
- The Three from the Filling Station (1955)
- The Happy Wanderer (1955)
- Kitty and the Great Big World (1956)
- The Big Chance (1957)
- Vienna, City of My Dreams (1957)
- Love from Paris (1957)
- Spring in Berlin (1957)
- The Unexcused Hour (1957)

== Bibliography ==
- Bergfelder, Tim. International Adventures: German Popular Cinema and European Co-Productions in the 1960s. Berghahn Books, 2005.
- Hake, Sabine. German National Cinema. Routledge, 2002.
- Poore, Carole. Disability in Twentieth-Century German Culture. University of Michigan Press, 2009.
