= Kurt Ulrich =

German film producer (1905–1967)

- Born: 28 June 1905; Berlin, German Empire
- Died: 11 September 1967 (aged 62); West Berlin, West Germany
- Occupation: Film producer
- Years active: 1933-1964

Kurt Ulrich (28 June 1905 – 11 September 1967) was a German film producer. He produced more than 140 films between 1933 and 1964. He was born in Berlin, Germany.

== Selected filmography ==
- Everything for a Woman (1935)
- Every Day Isn't Sunday (1935)
- The Unfaithful Eckehart (1940)
- Peter Voss, Thief of Millions (1946)
- By a Nose (1949)
- Nothing But Coincidence (1949)
- One Night Apart (1950)
- The Heath Is Green (1951)
- Mikosch Comes In (1952)
- The Land of Smiles (1952)
- At the Well in Front of the Gate (1952)
- When The Village Music Plays on Sunday Nights (1953)
- Hooray, It's a Boy! (1953)
- When the White Lilacs Bloom Again (1953)
- The Bird Seller (1953)
- Love is Forever (1954)
- The Gypsy Baron (1954)
- On the Reeperbahn at Half Past Midnight (1954)
- Emil and the Detectives (1954)
- The Happy Village (1955)
- Yes, Yes, Love in Tyrol (1955)
- The Three from the Filling Station (1955)
- Black Forest Melody (1956)
- The Legs of Dolores (1957)
- Spring in Berlin (1957)
- The Fox of Paris (1957)
- Peter Voss, Thief of Millions (1958)
- It Happened Only Once (1958)
- Iron Gustav (1958)
- The Muzzle (1958)
- The Copper (1958)
- The Crammer (1958)
- Black Forest Cherry Schnapps (1958)
- That's No Way to Land a Man (1959)
- Paradise for Sailors (1959)
- The Man Who Walked Through the Wall (1959)
- The Merry War of Captain Pedro (1959)
- Every Day Isn't Sunday (1959)
- Peter Voss, Hero of the Day (1959)
- Old Heidelberg (1959)
- The Avenger (1960)
- The Juvenile Judge (1960)
- Das Kunstseidene Mädchen (1960)
- The Last Witness (1960)
- Three Men in a Boat (1961)
- You Must Be Blonde on Capri (1961)
- Aurora Marriage Bureau (1962)
- The Gypsy Baron (1962)
- The Threepenny Opera (1963)
- I Learned It from Father (1964)
