= Rudi Schuricke =

German singer and actor (1913–1973)

External audio
- Shellac recordings with Rudi Schuricke in the Online Archive of the Österreichische Mediathek

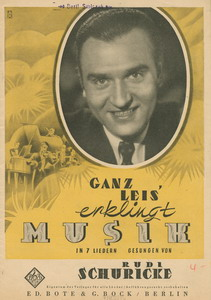
Rudi Schuricke

Rudi Schuricke (born Erhard Rudolf Hans Schuricke; 16 March 1913, Brandenburg an der Havel – 28 December 1973) was a popular German singer and actor. In the 1930s he was Second Tenor with the Kardosch Singers, a popular vocal ensemble of the time. When the group dissolved in 1935, Schuricke joined the Spree Revellers and later proceeded to found his own vocal group, the Schuricke Terzett. He also appeared as a solo singer with many popular orchestras of the 1930s and 1940s. His 1949 recording of "Capri-Fischer" was a "smash hit" in Germany. Even as late as the mid-1950s, he was still a successful musical artist. In 1954 alone, his song "Moulin Rouge" was the 74th most purchased single on the German year-end chart and another of his songs "Das Märchen unserer Liebe" appeared on the German Top50 chart. The advent of the rock 'n' roll age, however, soon made his music out-dated.

Schuricke tried to make a comeback in the early 1960s. At the time of his comeback, Billboard Magazine referred to him as "one of Germany's hottest recording stars of former years." Schuricke returned to the music charts in 1980, when a compilation of his songs, Noch einmal mit Gefühl, reached the No. 6 spot on the German albums chart. It remained on the chart for ten weeks.

== Discography ==
His solo recordings include:

- Capri-Fischer (1949 – Record 47001 Polydor, first recorded in 1943)
- Abends in Napoli (1949 – Record 47001 Polydor)
- Auf Wiedersehn (1950 – Record 47002 Polydor)
- Florentinische Nächte (1950 – Record 47002 Polydor)
- Dreh Dich Noch Einmal Um
- Einmal Wirst Du Wieder Bei Mir Sein
- Es War ein Traum Cherie
- Es Werden Wieder Rosen Blüh'n
- Glaube Mir / Mütterlein
- Heimat, Deine Sterne
- Ja und Nein
- Komm Bald Wieder
- Komm' Zurück
- Lilli und Luise
- Moulin Rouge (Ein Lied aus Paris)
- O Mia Bella Napoli
- Optimismus ist die Beste Medizin
- Penny Serenade
- Schenk Mir Dein Lächeln, Maria
- So eine Liebe Gibt es Einmal Nur
- Wenn der Schnee Fällt auf die Rosen
- So Leb Dein Leben (My Way) (his last single, 1973)
- Stern von Rio
- Tarantella
- Tulpen aus Amsterdam (bz Ernst Bader)
- Und Wieder Geht ein Schöner Tag zu Ende
- Warum Weinst Du, Kleine Tamara
- Wenn Du in Meinen Träumen Bei Mir Bist (Over the Rainbow)
- Hm Hm, Du Bist so Zauberhaft

== Sources ==
- Küsel, Gudrun (2011). Brandenburgs berühmte Töchter und Söhne. Gudensberg-Gleichen: Wartberg-Verl. pp. 48–9. ISBN 3831323062. (in German)
- Janßen, Kim-Christin (2007). Die Italienwelle - Capri-Fischer im zeitgeschichtlichen Kontext. München: GRIN Verlag GmbH. ISBN 3638816605. (in German)
- Josef Westner. Rudi Schuricke Biography with photos on grammophon-platten.de/
