= Gustav Kampendonk =

German screenwriter

- Born: 30 May 1909; Hoengen, German Empire
- Died: 29 June 1966 (aged 57); West Berlin, West Germany
- Occupation: Screenwriter
- Years active: 1939–1966

Gustav Kampendonk (30 May 1909 – 29 June 1966) was a German screenwriter. He wrote for 90 films between 1939 and 1966. He was born in Hoengen, Germany and died in West Berlin.

== Selected filmography ==
- Three Fathers for Anna (1939)
- The Wedding Hotel (1944)
- Summer Nights (1944)
- Morituri (1948)
- Only One Night (1950)
- The Girl from the South Seas (1950)
- The Woman from Last Night (1950)
- Furioso (1950)
- The Deadly Dreams (1951)
- You Have to be Beautiful (1951)
- The Thief of Bagdad (1952)
- I Lost My Heart in Heidelberg (1952)
- Lady's Choice (1953)
- On the Reeperbahn at Half Past Midnight (1954)
- The Three from the Filling Station (1955)
- The Happy Village (1955)
- Love Is Just a Fairytale (1955)
- Yes, Yes, Love in Tyrol (1955)
- The Stolen Trousers (1956)
- The Daring Swimmer (1957)
- Peter Voss, Thief of Millions (1958)
- It Happened Only Once (1958)
- Black Forest Cherry Schnapps (1958)
- Peter Shoots Down the Bird (1959)
- Triplets on Board (1959)
- Freddy, the Guitar and the Sea (1959)
- Peter Voss, Hero of the Day (1959)
- La Paloma (1959)
- Of Course, the Motorists (1959)
- Freddy and the Melody of the Night (1960)
- The Avenger (1960)
- Adieu, Lebewohl, Goodbye (1961)
- One Prettier Than the Other (1961)
- Ramona (1961)
- Robert and Bretram (1961)
- The Secret of the Black Trunk (1962)
- I Must Go to the City (1962)
- The Strangler of Blackmoor Castle (1963)
- Freddy in the Wild West (1964)
- Golden Goddess of Rio Beni (1964)
- The Heath Is Green (1972)
