= René Carol =

German singer

Gerhard Tschierschnitz, known as René Carol (Berlin, 11 April 1920 - Minden, 9 April 1978), was a German Schlager singer of the 1950s and 1960s.

== Hit singles ==
Song title, year, German chart placement (all on Polydor)

- Maria aus Bahia, 1948
- Sarina, 20 April 1950, Philips PH 4003a
- Mandolino, Mandolino, 20 April 1950, Philips PH 4003b
- La-le-lu, 1951 (with Lonny Kellner)
- Im Hafen von Adano, 1951 (with Lonny Kellner)
- Rote Rosen, Rote Lippen, Roter Wein, 1953 (first gold record)
- Bella, Bella Donna, 1953
- Es blüht eine weisse Lilie, 1953
- Kein Land kann schöner sein, 1960
- Das Schiff deiner Sehnsucht, 1960
- Mitten im Meer, 1960
- Hafenmarie, 1961
- Ein Vagabundenherz, 1961
- Der rote Wein, 1962
- Das macht der Sonnenschein, 1962
- Prinzessin Sonnenschein, 1963
- Bianca Rosa, 1964
- Wenn einmal in fernen Tagen, 1967
- Sie war meine Marianne, 1971
- Liebe und Wein, 1972
