= Peter Voss, Thief of Millions =

Peter Voss, Thief of Millions (German: Peter Voss, der Millionendieb) may refer to:

- Peter Voss, Thief of Millions (novel), a comedy crime novel by Ewald Gerhard Seeliger
- Peter Voss, Thief of Millions (1921 film), a silent film directed by Georg Jacoby
- Peter Voss, Thief of Millions (1932 film), a film directed by E.A. Dupont
- Peter Voss, Thief of Millions (1946 film), a film directed by Karl Anton
- Peter Voss, Thief of Millions (1958 film), a film directed by Wolfgang Becker
- Peter Voss, Thief of Millions (TV series), a 1977 television series

== See also ==
- Peter Voss, Hero of the Day, a 1959 film
