= Peter Voss, Thief of Millions (1932 film) =

1932 film directed by Ewald André Dupont

- German film poster
- German: Peter Voss, der Millionendieb
- Directed by: Ewald André Dupont
- Written by: Albrecht Joseph; Bruno Frank; Ewald André Dupont
- Based on: Peter Voss, Thief of Millions by Ewald Gerhard Seeliger
- Produced by: Karl Grune
- Starring: Willi Forst; Alice Treff; Paul Hörbiger; Ida Wüst
- Cinematography: Friedl Behn-Grund
- Music by: Peter Kreuder
- Production company: Münchner Lichtspielkunst
- Distributed by: Bavaria Film
- Release date: 22 March 1932
- Running time: 104 minutes
- Country: Germany
- Language: German

Peter Voss, Thief of Millions (German: Peter Voss, der Millionendieb) is a 1932 German comedy crime film directed by Ewald André Dupont and starring Willi Forst, Alice Treff, and Paul Hörbiger. It was based on the 1913 novel of the same title by Ewald Gerhard Seeliger which has been adapted into a number of films including previously in 1921 and later in 1946. It was the second to last film made by Dupont in Germany before he was forced to flee to the United States following the rise of the Nazi Party.

It was shot at the Emelka Studios in Munich with location shooting in Marseille. The film's sets were designed by the art directors Ludwig Reiber and Willy Reiber.

== Cast ==
- Willi Forst as Peter Voß
- Alice Treff as Polly
- Paul Hörbiger as Bobby Dodd
- Ida Wüst as Madame Bianca
- Otto Wernicke as Pitt
- Hans Hermann Schaufuß as Schilling
- Edith d'Amara as Schilling's secretary
- Johannes Roth as asthmatical man
- Josef Eichheim as Plaschke
- Will Dohm as night club's innkeeper
- Willi Schaeffers as Arab
- Gregori Chmara as Pasha
- Luise Werckmeister as female corporal
- Aenne Goerling as chanteuse
- Therese Giehse as cleaner
- Kurt Horwitz as 1st broker
- O. E. Hasse as 2nd broker
- Henri Hertsch as 3rd broker
- Erika Mann as 1st tour guide
- Rudolf Amend as 2nd tour guide
- Fritz Schlenk as Purser
- Reinhold Bernt as newspaper man

== Bibliography ==
- Klaus, Ulrich J. Deutsche Tonfilme: Jahrgang 1932. Klaus-Archiv, 1988.
