= Peter Voss, Thief of Millions (TV series) =

- Genre: Adventure
- Based on: Peter Voss, Thief of Millions by Ewald Gerhard Seeliger
- Written by: Peter Lodynski
- Directed by: Peter Lodynski
- Starring: Wolf Roth
- Composer: Arpad Bondy
- Country of origin: West Germany
- Original language: German
- No. of series: 1
- No. of episodes: 13

Production
- Producer: Joachim G. Staab
- Running time: 50 minutes

Original release
- Network: ZDF
- Release: 7 May – 13 August 1977

Peter Voss, Thief of Millions (German: Peter Voss, der Millionendieb) is a West German adventure television series originally broadcast on ZDF in 1977. It is inspired by the novel Peter Voss, Thief of Millions by Ewald Gerhard Seeliger which has been adapted into films on numerous occasions most recently the 1958 film Peter Voss, Thief of Millions.

== Bibliography ==
- Goble, Alan. The Complete Index to Literary Sources in Film. Walter de Gruyter, 1999.
