= Maibritt =

Maibritt is a given name. Notable people with the name include:

- Maibritt Kviesgaard (born 1986), Danish handball player
- Maibritt Saerens (born 1970), Danish actress

== See also ==
- Maibritt, das Mädchen von den Inseln
