= Edith Hancke =

German actress (1928–2015)

- Born: 14 October 1928; Berlin, Germany
- Died: 4 June 2015 (aged 86); Berlin, Germany
- Occupation: Actress
- Years active: 1949-2009

Edith Hancke (German: [ˈeː.diːt ˈhaŋ.kə]; 14 October 1928 – 4 June 2015) was a German stage, film and television actress.

== Life and career ==
Edith Hancke, daughter of a bank clerk, grew up in Berlin-Charlottenburg. She received an education at the Lettehaus and, at the age of 20, attended Marlise Ludwig's acting school at Wilmersdorfer Wilhelmsaue. She received her first engagements at Berlin theaters beginning in 1948. She made guest appearances at the Renaissance Theater, the Deutsches Theater, the Schlosspark Theater, the Schillertheater, the Theater am Kurfürstendamm and the Berliner Komödie, among others.

Her real profession remained the theater. Several times she received the Golden Curtain, the award for the most popular actress in Berlin. Edith Hancke also performed for two years as a member of the cabaret Die Stachelschweine. She appeared in 150 episodes of the popular radio entertainment series Pension Spreewitz on RIAS. Even at the age of 72, she starred in the play Fenster zum Flur for one year. From 1981 to 1987, she was the narrator in the RIAS radio play series Damals war's - Geschichten aus dem alten Berlin. She thus succeeded the narrator Ewald Wenck, who died in 1981.

Through her work as a dubbing artist, Hancke's voice (which was the result of a botched tonsillectomy as a child) can be heard in many foreign films, such as the Czechoslovak musical feature film Lemonade Joe (1964). She dubbed Baby Sinclair on the U.S. series Dinosaurs. She had been married since 1972 to fellow actor Klaus Sonnenschein, whom she had met at the Theater Tribüne in 1970, in their third marriage and lived with him in their home in Holstein and in Berlin-Schlachtensee. In the TV film Schaumküsse (2009), Hancke and Sonnenschein made a joint appearance as a married couple, which was their last role as actors for both of them.

== Selected filmography ==
- The Beaver Coat (1949) - Adelheid Wolff
- Bürgermeister Anna (1950) - Grete Drews
- The Merry Wives of Windsor (1950) - Lehrling bei Reich (uncredited)
- Modell Bianka (1951) - Jungarbeiterin Inge Lang
- We'll Talk About Love Later (1953) - Frau Pingel
- The Abduction of the Sabine Women (1954) - Fräulein Müller-Muthesius
- Sky Without Stars (1955) - Frau am Kontrollpunkt
- Your Life Guards (1955) - Zofe
- Urlaub auf Ehrenwort (1955) - Erna
- A Thousand Melodies (1956)
- The Captain from Köpenick (1956) - Sick girl
- If We All Were Angels (1956) - Junge Animierdame
- Ein Mann muß nicht immer schön sein (1956) - Frl. Zimmermann, Sekretärin
- Spring in Berlin (1957) - Uschi Paulsen
- Madeleine Tel. 13 62 11 (1958) - Edith - The Maid
- Schmutziger Engel (1958) - Gerti
- Black Forest Cherry Schnapps (1958) - Jette Palm
- The Muzzle (1958) - Billa
- Ohne Mutter geht es nicht (1958) - Hausmädchen Elisabeth
- My Ninety Nine Brides (1958) - Ruth
- Kleine Leute mal ganz groß (1958) - Marie Maier
- Court Martial (1959) - Frl. Wehner
- Peter Shoots Down the Bird (1959) - Fräulein Lehmann
- Of Course, the Motorists (1959) - Autofahrerin
- A Doctor of Conviction (1959) - Schwester Elvira
- Boomerang (1960) - Woman in train
- Als geheilt entlassen (1960) - Lore
- I Learned That in Paris (1960)
- Vertauschtes Leben (1961)
- Pichler's Books Are Not in Order (1961) - Emma
- The Marriage of Mr. Mississippi (1961) - Lukretia
- Am Sonntag will mein Süsser mit mir segeln gehn (1961) - Minna, die Köchin
- The Strange Countess (1961) - Lizzy Smith
- Beloved Impostor (1961) - Stewardess
- So liebt und küsst man in Tirol (1961) - Ida Würzig
- Dicke Luft (1962) - Fräulein Weierlein
- Ohne Krimi geht die Mimi nie ins Bett (1962) - Mimi
- Universo di notte (1962) - Self - Host German Version
- Breakfast in Bed (1963) - Mrs. Müller
- Holiday in St. Tropez (1964) - Friedericke Kussmaul
- Don't Tell Me Any Stories (1964) - 'Veilchen' (NSU Prinz) (voice)
- Black Eagle of Santa Fe (1965) - Alice
- Tausend Takte Übermut (1965) - Ernestine Glücklich
- The Great Happiness (1967) - Mrs. Kleinschmitt
- Midsummer Night (1967) - Miss Nilsson
- Paradies der flotten Sünder (1968) - Grete
- Otto ist auf Frauen scharf (1968) - Garderobenfrau
- Charley's Uncle (1969) - Helga
- Heintje: A Heart Goes on a Journey (1969) - Lieschen
- Why Did I Ever Say Yes Twice? (1969) - Hausmädchen
- Our Willi Is the Best (1971) - Elsetraut Knöpfke
- Old Barge, Young Love (1973) - Eleonore Strunz
- Unsere Tante ist das Letzte (1973) - Sieglinde Hirsekorn, Otto-Wilhelms Frau
- Meister Eder und sein Pumuckl (1982) - Frau Bauer

== Bibliography ==
- Cowie, Peter. World Filmography: 1967. Fairleigh Dickinson Univ Press, 1977.
