= Odemar =

Odemar is a surname. Notable people with the surname include:

- Erik Odemar, known as Erik Ode (1910–1983), German director and actor
- Fritz Odemar senior (Karl Julius Friedrich Odemar; 1858–1926), German actor
- Fritz Odemar (Fritz Otto Emil Odemar; 1890–1955), German actor
