= The Abduction of the Sabine Women (1954 film) =

1954 film

- Theatrical film poster
- German: Der Raub der Sabinerinnen
- Directed by: Kurt Hoffmann
- Written by: Emil Burri; Johannes Mario Simmel; Franz von Schönthan (play); Paul von Schönthan (play)
- Produced by: Artur Brauner
- Starring: Gustav Knuth; Fita Benkhoff; Paul Hörbiger
- Cinematography: Albert Benitz
- Edited by: Johanna Meisel
- Music by: Ernst Steffan
- Production company: CCC Film
- Distributed by: Allianz Filmverleih
- Release date: 2 April 1954
- Running time: 89 minutes
- Country: West Germany
- Language: German

The Abduction of the Sabine Women (German: Der Raub der Sabinerinnen) is a 1954 West German musical comedy film directed by Kurt Hoffmann and starring Gustav Knuth, Fita Benkhoff and Paul Hörbiger.

The film's sets were designed by the art directors Hermann Warm, Erich Grave and Paul Markwitz. It was shot at the Spandau Studios in Berlin and on location in Bavaria.

== Cast ==
- Gustav Knuth as Emanuel Striese
- Fita Benkhoff as Frau Striese
- Paul Hörbiger as Professor Martin Gollwitz
- Loni Heuser as Frau Friederike Gollwitz
- Anneliese Kaplan as Renate Gollwitz
- Bully Buhlan as Charly Gross
- Ernst Waldow as Emil Gross
- Willi Rose as mayor
- Ruth Stephan as Maid Rosa
- Wolfgang Müller as Friedrich
- Edith Hancke as Fräulein Müller-Muthesius
- Hans Stiebner as Perchtramer
- Jakob Tiedtke as Chief baker
- Herbert Weissbach as Professor of Biology
- Margitta Sonke as Iphigenie Striese
- Norbert Steinkrauß as Othello Striese
- Wolfgang Condrus as Hamlet Striese
- Ekkehard Lau as Torquato Striese
- Friedrich Domin as Dichter
- Wolfgang Jansen
- Egon Vogel

== See also ==
- The Abduction of the Sabine Women (1928)
- The Abduction of the Sabine Women (1936)
- Romulus and the Sabines (Italy, 1945)
