= Fritz Wagner (actor) =

German actor

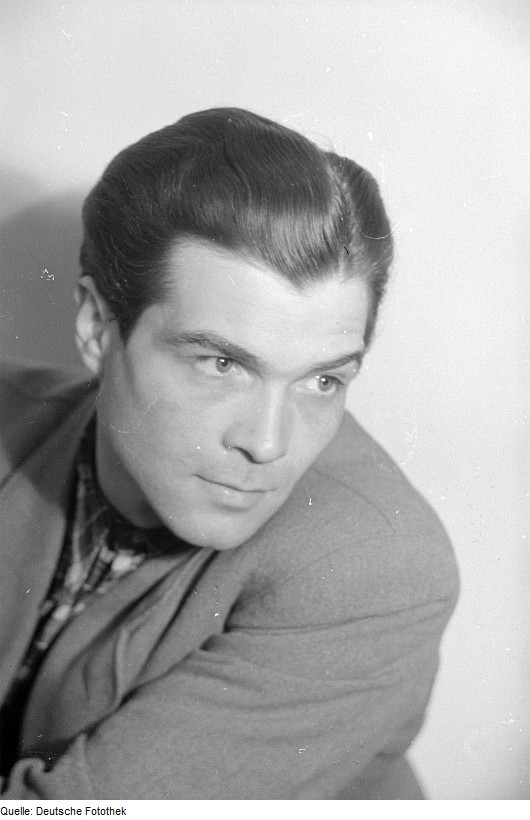
- Wagner in February 1946, photographed by Avraham Pisarek
- Born: 19 March 1915; Heilbronn, German Empire
- Died: 19 January 1982 (aged 66); Bonn, West Germany
- Occupation: Actor
- Years active: 1939-1976

Fritz Wagner (19 March 1915 - 19 January 1982) was a German actor. He appeared in more than sixty films from 1939 to 1976.

== Filmography ==
Year	Title	Role	Notes
1939	Fasching	Gast auf Karins Atelierfest	
1940	The Eternal Spring	2. Knecht	
1941	Stukas	Feldwebel Franz	
1941	People in the Storm	Lech	
1942	A Gust of Wind	Junger Mann	
1942	With the Eyes of a Woman	Jan Collander	
1943	Sophienlund	Knut Eckberg	
1943	Gefährlicher Frühling	Klaus Babian	
1944	The Impostor	Dieter Brenken	
1945	Bravo, Little Thomas	Wilhelm Rennert, ältester Sohn	
1945	Der Erbförster		
1945	Leb' wohl, Christina	Schüler Hans	
1946	Free Land	Neubauer Jeruscheit	
1947	Zugvögel	Wolfgang	
1947	In Those Days	Der Leutnant / 5. Geschichte	
1948	Film Without a Title	Jochen Fleming	
1948	Und wieder 48	Burghardt	
1949	Die Brücke	Martin Reinhardt	
1949	Girls Behind Bars	Harald Hauffe	
1950	Der Kahn der fröhlichen Leute	Michel Staude	
1950	Erzieherin gesucht	Rolf Terbrügge	
1950	Crown Jewels	Georges	
1951	Herzen im Sturm	Trox Hansen	
1951	Modell Bianka	Gerd Neumann	
1952	Großstadtgeheimnis		
1952	Klettermaxe	Warnecke	
1952	At the Well in Front of the Gate	Robert Murphy	
1953	Anna Susanna	Uwe Frahm	
1953	Knall and Fall as Detectives	Peter	
1953	When The Village Music Plays on Sunday Nights	Franz, Ertls Bruder	
1954	Die tolle Lola		
1954	The Beautiful Miller	Anton Vogt	
1954	On the Reeperbahn at Half Past Midnight	Kattmann	
1954	Das Phantom des großen Zeltes		
1955	Ein Mann vergißt die Liebe		
1955	The Captain and His Hero	Hauptmann Peppmöller	
1955	Sergeant Borck	Hauptkommissar Dahl	
1955	One Woman Is Not Enough?	Junger Assessor	
1955	Bandits of the Autobahn	Wolfgang Hinz	
1955	The Happy Wanderer	2. Tenor	
1955	My Children and I	Erpresser	
1955	Urlaub auf Ehrenwort	Unteroffizier Kramer	
1956	Winter in the Woods		
1956	Black Forest Melody	Stallmeister	
1956	Zu Befehl, Frau Feldwebel	Hauptmann Müller	
1956	The Old Forester House	Direktor Hardt	
1957	Banktresor 713	Hartmanns Komplice	
1957	Spring in Berlin	Bankräuber	
1958	Lilli	Hans	
1958	The Copper	Emil	
1961	Bei Pichler stimmt die Kasse nicht		
