= A Heart Plays False =

1953 film directed by Rudolf Jugert

- Directed by: Rudolf Jugert
- Written by: Hans-Ulrich Horster (novel); Erna Fentsch
- Produced by: Georg Witt
- Starring: O.W. Fischer; Ruth Leuwerik; Carl Wery
- Cinematography: Helmut Ashley
- Edited by: Claus von Boro
- Music by: Werner Eisbrenner
- Production company: Georg Witt-Film
- Distributed by: Bavaria Film
- Release date: 16 July 1953
- Running time: 110 minutes
- Country: West Germany
- Language: German

A Heart Plays False (German: Ein Herz spielt falsch) is a 1953 West German drama film directed by Rudolf Jugert and starring O.W. Fischer, Ruth Leuwerik and Carl Wery. It was shot at the Bavaria Studios in Munich. The film's sets were designed by the art directors Franz Bi and Botho Hoefer.

== Cast ==
- O.W. Fischer as Peter van Booven
- Ruth Leuwerik as Sybilla Zander
- Carl Wery as Professor Linz
- Gertrud Kückelmann as Gerda Peters
- Günther Lüders as Kersten
- Lina Carstens as Mutter Pratsch
- Ernst Fritz Fürbringer
- Rolf von Nauckhoff as Direktor Hersbach
- Hermann Speelmans as Matz
- Gert Fröbe as Briefüberbringer
- Rudolf Vogel as Charles
- Otto Arneth as Dr. Hersbachs Bruder
- Rainer Penkert as Dr. Neumeister
- Hedwig Wangel as Mummie
- Doris Kirchner as Kellnerin
- Petra Unkel
- Greta Keller as Chansonniere / Cabaret Singer

== Bibliography ==
- Nelmes, Jill; Selbo, Jule, eds. (2015). Women Screenwriters: An International Guide. Palgrave Macmillan. ISBN 978-1-137-31236-5.
