= Black Forest Melody =

1956 film directed by Géza von Bolváry

- Directed by: Géza von Bolváry
- Written by: Werner P. Zibaso
- Produced by: Kurt Ulrich
- Starring: Carl Wery; Gardy Granass; Willy Fritsch
- Cinematography: Kurt Schulz
- Edited by: Ingrid Wacker
- Music by: Gerhard Winkler
- Production company: Berolina Film
- Distributed by: UFA
- Release date: 9 August 1956
- Running time: 100 minutes
- Country: West Germany
- Language: German

Black Forest Melody (German: Schwarzwaldmelodie) is a 1956 West German romantic comedy film directed by Géza von Bolváry and starring Carl Wery, Gardy Granass, and Willy Fritsch. It was shot at the Tempelhof Studios in Berlin and on location in Hamburg at the Circus Roland. The film's sets were designed by the art directors Hans Kuhnert and Paul Markwitz.

== Cast ==
- Carl Wery as Stettner
- Claus Biederstaedt as Hans Homann
- Gardy Granass as Susanne
- Willy Fritsch as Herbert Olberg
- Erica Beer as Harriet Morton
- Siegfried Breuer Jr. as Fredy
- Carla Hagen as Kuni
- Hans Leibelt as Mr. Morton
- Walter Giller as Luggi
- Ralph Lothar as Albert
- Kurt Reimann as Lerche
- Marina Ried as Uschi
- Hans Richter as Aribert
- Fritz Wagner as Stallmeister
- Kurt Zehe as Balthasar
- Erich Fiedler
- Gerd Frickhöffer
- Maria Leininger
- Alexa von Porembsky
- Herbert Weissbach
- Trude Wilke-Roßwog

== Bibliography ==
- Von Moltke, Johannes (2005). No Place Like Home: Locations of Heimat in German Cinema. Berkeley: University of California Press. ISBN 978-0-520-93859-5.
