= The Elephant in a China Shop =

1958 film

- Directed by: Heinz Paul
- Written by: Vinzenz Grünwald; Jochen Kuhlmey; Heinz Paul
- Produced by: Heinz Paul
- Starring: Carl Wery; Mara Lane; Dietmar Schönherr
- Cinematography: Hans Schneeberger
- Edited by: Karl Aulitzky
- Music by: Karl Bette
- Production company: H.P. Filmproduktion
- Distributed by: Union-Film
- Release date: 20 June 1958
- Running time: 100 minutes
- Country: West Germany
- Language: German

The Elephant in a China Shop (German: Der Elefant im Porzellanladen) is a 1958 West German comedy film directed by Heinz Paul and starring Carl Wery, Mara Lane and Dietmar Schönherr.

The film's sets were designed by the art director Max Seefelder.

== Cast ==
- Carl Wery as Theodor Tanner, Genannt TT
- Mara Lane as Ilona
- Dietmar Schönherr as Clemens, Der Diener
- Rudolf Vogel as Diener
- Loni Heuser as Bessi, Wirtschafterin
- Paula Braend as Gefängniswärterin
- Johnny Cox as Tante Rosina
- Robert Fackler as Gefängniswärter Bemme

== Bibliography ==
- Harris M. Lentz. Obituaries in the Performing Arts, 2014. McFarland, 2015.
