= Günther Lüders =

German actor (1905–1975)

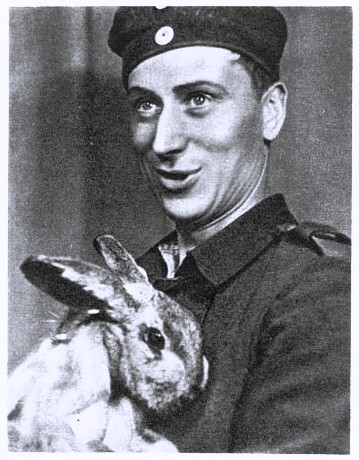
- Günther Lüders in 1937
- Born: 5 March 1905; Lübeck, German Empire
- Died: 1 March 1975 (aged 69); Düsseldorf, West Germany
- Resting place: Burgtorfriedhof
- Occupation: Actor
- Years active: 1934–1975

Günther Lüders (5 March 1905 – 1 March 1975) was a German actor. He appeared in more than 120 films between 1934 and 1975. He lived in Urfeld am Walchensee from 1954 until 1975.

== Selected filmography ==
- Count Woronzeff (1934), as Cousin Boris
- Hearts are Trumps (1934), as Jonny Adriani
- Game on Board (1936), as Seaman
- The Island (1934)
- Miss Liselott (1934)
- The Foolish Virgin (1935) as Tappe
- Der Etappenhase (1937), as Pvt. Hein Lammers
- Alarm in Peking (1937), as Corporal Lüdecke
- Autobus S (1937), as Gustav Bauer
- A Girl Goes Ashore (1938), as Krischan
- Wibbel the Tailor (1939), as Tailor journeyman Peter Zimpel / Heinz Zimpel
- Men Are That Way (1939)
- Wunschkonzert (1940), as Zimmermann
- Mistress Moon (1941), as Friese
- Six Days of Leave (1941), as Willi Schmitz
- Love Me (1942)
- A Flea in Her Ear (1943), as Postangestellter Friesecke
- Secret File W.B.1 (1942), as Shipbuilder Karl Hösly
- A Man for My Wife (1943), as Fritz Olden
- A Waltz with You (1943), Inspizient Schnell
- Light of Heart (1943), as Philipp
- Marriage of Affection (1944), as Lothar Manning
- Große Freiheit Nr. 7 (1944), as Jens
- A Beautiful Day (1944), as Friedrich Schröder
- The Time with You (1948)
- The Day Before the Wedding (1952), as Weber
- A Heart Plays False (1952), as Kersten
- Father Needs a Wife (1952)
- Scandal at the Girls' School (1953)
- The Bird Seller (1953)
- His Royal Highness (1953), as Butler Neumann
- Must We Get Divorced? (1953)
- The Country Schoolmaster (1954), as Vicar Sunneby
- Love is Forever (1954), as Ploetz
- The Sinful Village (1954), as Christian Süßbier
- The Perfect Couple (1954)
- Three Men in the Snow (1955), as Butler Johann Kesselhut
- The Happy Village (1955), as Hinnerk
- The False Adam (1955)
- Father's Day (1955), as Franz Novotny
- Roses in Autumn (1955), as Alonzo Gieshübler
- If We All Were Angels (1956, director)
- All Roads Lead Home (1957)
- The Girl and the Legend (1957), as Mr. Drinkwater
- Kein Auskommen mit dem Einkommen! (1957), as August Bodendiek
- Vater, unser bestes Stück (1957, director)
- A Piece of Heaven (1957), as Kellner
- The Spessart Inn (1958), as Baron Eberhard Sperling
- Thirteen Old Donkeys (1958), as Vicar
- Ihr 106. Geburtstag (1958, director)
- Lilli (1958), as Portier
- The Buddenbrooks (1959), as Corle Smolt
- Crime Tango (1960), as Uncle Albert
- I'm an Elephant, Madame (1969), as Dr. Hartmann
