= Sun, Wine and Hard Nuts =

- Genre: Crime drama
- Directed by: Hermann Leitner; Dieter Lemmel
- Starring: Erik Ode; Hilde Volk
- Composer: Rolf Kühn
- Country of origin: West Germany
- Original language: German
- No. of series: 2
- No. of episodes: 21

Production
- Producer: Kurt Sippel
- Running time: 25 minutes
- Production company: Westdeutsches Werbefernsehen

Original release
- Network: ARD
- Release: 21 October 1977 – 11 November 1981

Sun, Wine and Hard Nuts (German: Sonne, Wein und harte Nüsse) is a West German crime television series broadcast on ARD.

A retired German police inspector goes to live on the French Riviera with his sister, but soon becomes involved helping the local police solve crimes. The show was a follow-up to Erik Ode's role in the long-running Munich-set detective show Der Kommissar. The role of his sister was played by his real-life wife Hilde Volk. The series was shot on location in Provence.

Other actors who appeared in the series include Jane Tilden, Barbara Valentin, Karin Hardt, Marianne Wischmann, Carl-Heinz Schroth, Howard Vernon, Brigitte Horney, Wolfgang Kieling, Wolfgang Preiss, Lukas Ammann, Andrea Rau, Silvia Reize, Rudolf Schündler, Reinhard Kolldehoff, Heli Finkenzeller, Ivan Desny and Iris Berben. Reinhard Glemnitz who had been a cast member of Der Kommissar also featured in the series, with several in-jokes referring to his earlier role.

== Main cast ==
- Erik Ode as Eric Ott
- Hilde Volk as Ilse Ott
- Hans-Joachim Frick as Jean Giraud
- Marianne Borgo as Claudine
- Jean-Pierre Zola as Jeannot

== Bibliography ==
- Hans-Michael Bock and Tim Bergfelder. The Concise Cinegraph: An Encyclopedia of German Cinema. Berghahn Books, 2009.
