= Erika von Thellmann =

German actress

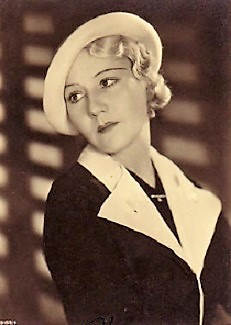
- Thellmann in the 1930s
- Born: 31 August 1902; Leutschau, Austria-Hungary
- Died: 27 October 1988 (aged 86); Calw, Baden-Württemberg, West Germany
- Occupation: Actress
- Years active: 1923–1983 (film)

Erika von Thellmann (1902–1988) was an Austrian actress who appeared in more than a hundred films and television series during her career.

== Selected filmography ==
- The Stone Rider (1923)
- Marriage Strike (1935)
- The Green Domino (1935)
- The Valley of Love (1935)
- The Foolish Virgin (1935)
- Susanne in the Bath (1936)
- Girls' Dormitory (1936)
- Women's Regiment (1936)
- The Irresistible Man (1937)
- Adventure in Love (1938)
- Mystery About Beate (1938)
- The Deruga Case (1938)
- The Great and the Little Love (1938)
- Young Noszty and Mary Toth (1938)
- Opera Ball (1939)
- Roses in Tyrol (1940)
- My Daughter Doesn't Do That (1940)
- Carl Peters (1941)
- Women Are Better Diplomats (1941)
- The Night in Venice (1942)
- With the Eyes of a Woman (1942)
- Kohlhiesel's Daughters (1943)
- Young Hearts (1944)
- Philharmonic (1944)
- Tell the Truth (1946)
- Everything Will Be Better in the Morning (1948)
- In the Temple of Venus (1948)
- Twelve Hearts for Charly (1949)
- Royal Children (1950)
- Kissing Is No Sin (1950)
- One Night Apart (1950)
- Everything for the Company (1950)
- Wedding with Erika (1950)
- The Violin Maker of Mittenwald (1950)
- Woe to Him Who Loves (1951)
- My Name is Niki (1952)
- A Very Big Child (1952)
- Toxi (1952)
- Fritz and Friederike (1952)
- Knall and Fall as Detectives (1952)
- The Exchange (1952)
- Scandal at the Girls' School (1953)
- Prosecutor Corda (1953)
- Such a Charade (1953)
- Ball of Nations (1954)
- The Spanish Fly (1955)
- Your Life Guards (1955)
- Her First Date (1955)
- The Double Husband (1955)
- Fruit Without Love (1956)
- The Girl Without Pyjamas (1957)
- The Count of Luxemburg (1957)
- The Good Soldier Schweik (1960)
- A Mission for Mr. Dodd (1964)
- The Swedish Girl (1965)
- Willi Manages The Whole Thing (1972)

== Bibliography ==
- Fritsche, Maria. Homemade Men In Postwar Austrian Cinema: Nationhood, Genre and Masculinity . Berghahn Books, 2013.
