= Rudolf Vogel =

German actor (1900–1967)

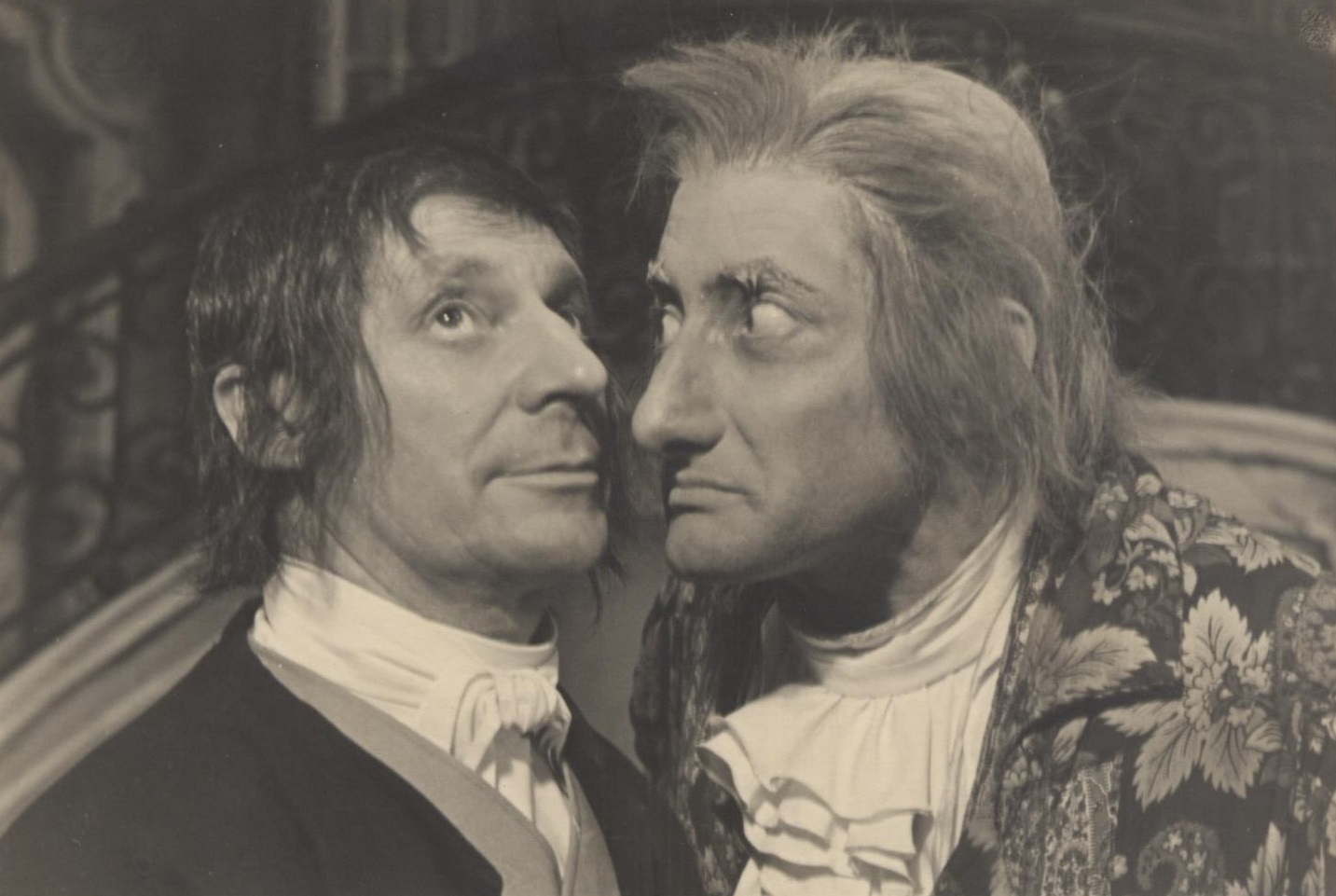
Ernst Barthels and Rudolf Vogel in Der Geizige von Molière (1939)

Rudolf Vogel (born 10 November 1900, Planegg – died 9 August 1967, Munich) was a German film and television actor.

He was the father of Peter Vogel, the father-in-law of Austrian actress Gertraud Jesserer and the grandfather of actor-journalist Nikolas Vogel.

He died in August 1967 from cancer.

== Selected filmography ==
- Venus on Trial (1941) - Dr. Gerhard Hümmelmann
- The Little Residence (1942) - Mierke
- To Be God One Time (1942) - Fernandez
- Between Yesterday and Tomorrow (1947)
- Der Herr vom andern Stern (1948) - Kanzleirat
- The Lost Face (1948) - Professor Kersten
- The Original Sin (1948)
- Hans im Glück (1949)
- Zwei in einem Anzug (1950) - Gerichtsvollzieher
- The Disturbed Wedding Night (1950) - Bürovorsteher
- Czardas der Herzen (1951)
- Maya of the Seven Veils (1951)
- Decision Before Dawn (1951) - Volkssturmmann (uncredited)
- Der blaue Stern des Südens (1951)
- Monks, Girls and Hungarian Soldiers (1952) - Stops, Hofnarr
- Father Needs a Wife (1952) - Kellner (uncredited)
- The Exchange (1952) - Alisi Resch
- A Heart Plays False (1953) - Charles
- Music by Night (1953) - Joseph, Oberkellner
- As Long as You're Near Me (1953) - Hotelier
- The Monastery's Hunter (1953) - Bader
- Arlette Conquers Paris (1953) - Kunsthändler Jean Maurot
- Fanfare of Marriage (1953) - Wurm
- Must We Get Divorced? (1953) - Herr Huber
- Elephant Fury (1953)
- Stars Over Colombo (1953) - Yogi
- Jonny Saves Nebrador (1953) - Major Souza
- Ehestreik (1953)
- The Prisoner of the Maharaja (1954) - Yogi
- Sauerbruch – Das war mein Leben (1954) - Kellner im Bristol
- The First Kiss (1954) - Mons. Oberbitzler
- The Flying Classroom (1954) - Friseur Krüger
- Ein Haus voll Liebe (1954)
- Fireworks (1954) - Onkel Gustav
- Victoria in Dover (1954) - George - ein Lakai
- Secrets of the City (1955) - Barkeeper
- Hello, My Name is Cox (1955) - Nachtwächter Oskar Ojevaar
- Reaching for the Stars (1955)
- As Long as There Are Pretty Girls (1955) - Herr Lerch
- A Heart Full of Music (1955) - Geschäftsführer Léaux
- Royal Hunt in Ischl (1955) - Diener Charles
- The Three from the Filling Station (1955)
- I Often Think of Piroschka (1955) - Sandor
- Furlough on Word of Honor (1955) - Rudi Pichler
- Sonnenschein und Wolkenbruch (1955)
- The Beggar Student (1956) - Enterich
- Bonjour Kathrin (1956) - Fogar
- The Road to Paradise (1956)
- The Golden Bridge (1956) - Hoppe
- Hilfe - sie liebt mich (1956) - Jonny, Barkeeper im "Elysée"
- Opera Ball (1956) - Eduard von Lamberg
- Through the Forests and Through the Trees (1956) - Valerian
- Uns gefällt die Welt (1956) - Knipperdolling
- Imperial and Royal Field Marshal (1956) - Hauptmann a.D. Ferdinand Kraus
- The Girl and the Legend (1957) - Mr. Herodes Pum
- Die verpfuschte Hochzeitsnacht (1957) - Albert Berthold
- Casino de Paris (1957) - Catherine's father
- Schön ist die Welt (1957) - Fritz Müllrath, Haldens Manager
- Der Kaiser und das Wäschermädel (1957) - Ludwig Söpringbrunn, Konfektionär
- A Piece of Heaven (1957) - Herr Müller
- The Spessart Inn (1958) - Buffon Parucchio
- A Woman Who Knows What She Wants (1958) - Herzmansky, Sekretär
- The Elephant in a China Shop (1958) - Diener
- Embezzled Heaven (1958) - Kompert
- Vento di primavera (1958)
- Die Landärztin vom Tegernsee (1958) - Zipfhauser
- Wenn die Conny mit dem Peter (1958) - Generaldirector Dr. Werneck
- Die Seeteufel von Angostura (1958)
- Hula-Hopp, Conny (1959) - John Newman
- The Man Who Walked Through the Wall (1959) - Fuchs - der Kriecher
- Du bist wunderbar (1959) - Xaver Lehmann
- Marili (1959) - Berthold Glubb
- Old Heidelberg (1959) - Kammerdiener Lutz
- Mrs. Warren's Profession (1960) - Reverend Samuel Gardner
- Pension Schöller (1960) - Gutsbesitzer Philipp Klapproth
- Oh! This Bavaria! (1960)
- Crime Tango (1960) - Lorenz
- Ingeborg (1960) - Herr Konjunktiv
- Crook and the Cross (1960) - Anton Braumberger
- Ach Egon! (1961) - Theodor Nathusius
- Heute gehn wir bummeln (1961) - Tibor Teleki
- Im sechsten Stock (1961) - Hocheöpot, Buchhalter
- Aurora Marriage Bureau (1962) - Graf Hohenperg
- The Bird Seller (1962) - Graf Weps
- The Forester's Daughter (1962) - Oberhofmeister
- Charley's Aunt (1963) - Niels Bergström
- Help, My Bride Steals (1964) - Psychotherapeut
- In Bed by Eight (1965) - Hofrat Andersen
- Heidi (1965) - Sebastian
