= Three Girls from the Rhine =

1955 film

- Directed by: Georg Jacoby
- Written by: Hanns H. Fischer; Georg Jacoby; Bobby E. Lüthge; Joachim Wedekind
- Produced by: Gero Wecker; Helmuth Volmer
- Starring: Gardy Granass; Margit Saad; Fita Benkhoff
- Cinematography: Erich Claunigk
- Edited by: Martha Dübber
- Music by: Franz Grothe
- Production company: Arca-Filmproduktion
- Distributed by: Allianz Filmverleih
- Release date: 25 November 1955
- Running time: 90 minutes
- Country: West Germany
- Language: German

Three Girls from the Rhine (German: Drei Mädels vom Rhein) is a 1955 West German comedy film directed by Georg Jacoby and starring Gardy Granass, Margit Saad and Fita Benkhoff. It was shot at the Tempelhof and Spandau Studios in West Berlin and the Wandsbek Studios in Hamburg. Filmed in Eastmancolor, location shooting took place in the Mosel including around Zell and at Schloss Lieser. The film's sets were designed by the art directors Erich Kettelhut and Johannes Ott.

== Synopsis ==
Ever since a large hotel opened nearby, an inn in a wine-producing town on the Rhine has been struggling financially. The owner wants to retain control and pass the inn on to her three daughters, refusing offers to turn it into a milk bar. Her daughters set out to make sure the inn hosts the annual wine festival in order to save it.

== Cast ==
- Gardy Granass as Susanne Hübner
- Margit Saad as Kitty Drechsler
- Fita Benkhoff as Therese Hübner
- Topsy Küppers as Sabine Hübner
- Siegfried Breuer Jr. as Werner Schulenburg
- Paul Henckels as Hannes
- Heinz Hilpert as Paul Schulenburg
- Robert Meyn as Philipp Drechsler
- Angelika Meissner as Kathrin Hübner
- Wolfgang Wahl as Fritz Junghans
- Frank Holms as Jack
- Ruth von Hagen as Rosa

== Bibliography ==
- Bock, Hans-Michael & Bergfelder, Tim. The Concise CineGraph. Encyclopedia of German Cinema. Berghahn Books, 2009.
