= Ulrich Erfurth =

German film director (1910–1986)

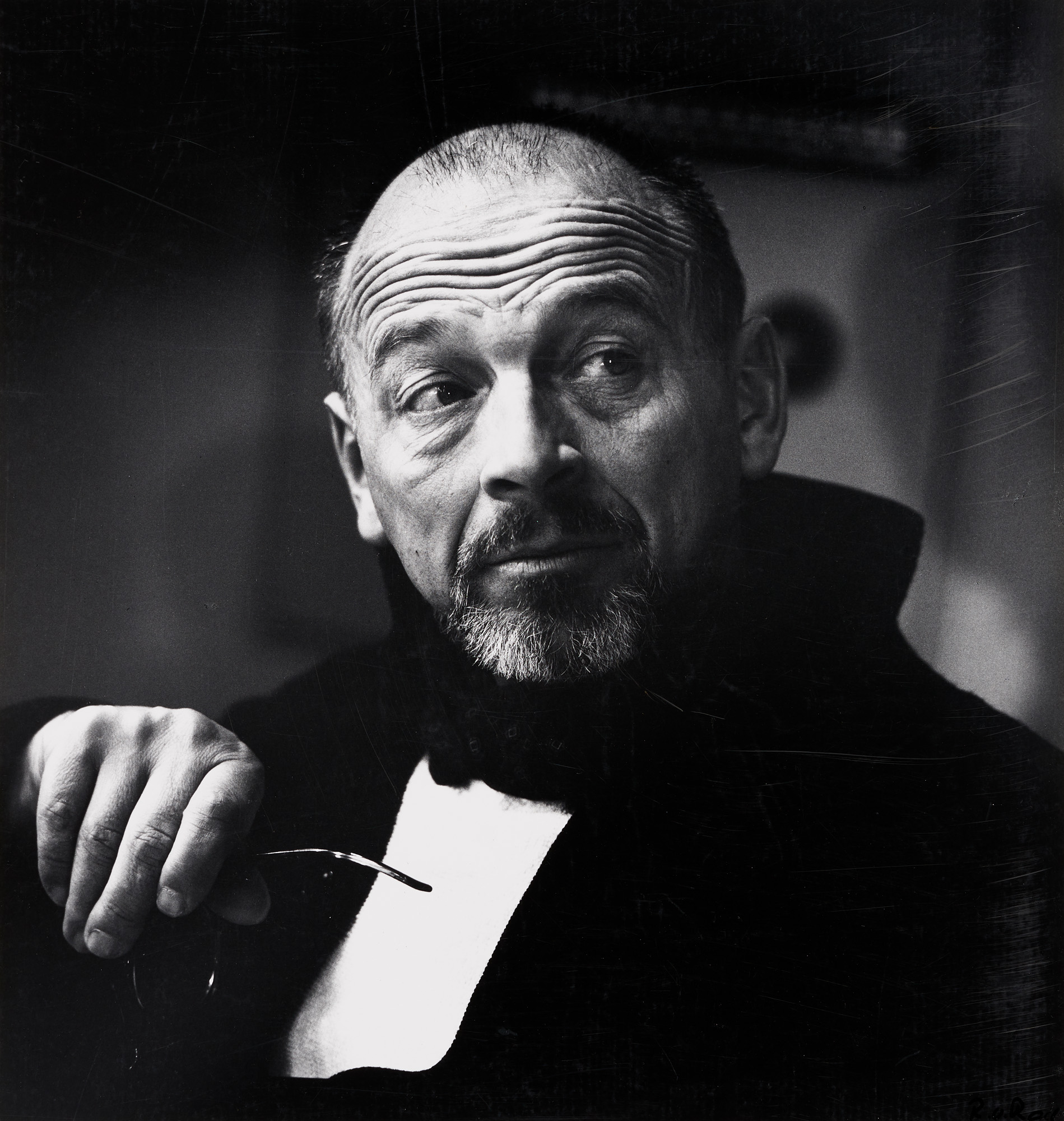
- Born: 22 March 1910; Elberfeld, German Empire
- Died: 19 September 1986 (aged 76); Hamburg, West Germany
- Occupations: Director, Actor
- Years active: 1939–1978 (film & TV)

Ulrich Erfurth (22 March 1910 – 19 September 1986) was a German film director.

== Filmography ==
=== Director ===
- Erzieherin gesucht (1944/1950)
- Finale (1948)
- Not Afraid of Big Animals (1953)
- Columbus Discovers Kraehwinkel (1954)
- Captain Wronski (1954)
- One Woman Is Not Enough? (1955)
- Ripening Youth (1955) — based on Die Reifeprüfung by Max Dreyer
- Fruit Without Love (1956)
- Melody of the Heath (1956)
- Three Birch Trees on the Heath (1956)
- Minna von Barnhelm (1957, TV film) — based on Minna von Barnhelm by Gotthold Ephraim Lessing
- Helden (1957, TV film) — based on Arms and the Man by George Bernard Shaw
- Colombe (1958, TV film) — based on Colombe by Jean Anouilh
- Die sechste Frau (1959, TV film) — based on Die sechste Frau by Max Christian Feiler
- Heaven, Love and Twine (1960)
- My Husband, the Economic Miracle (1961)
- Der Hochtourist (1961) — based on Der Hochtourist by Max Neal and Curt Kraatz
- Die Banditen (1962, TV film) — based on the operetta Les brigands
- Der tolle Tag (1962, TV film) — based on The Marriage of Figaro by Pierre Beaumarchais
- Das Leben ein Traum (1963, TV film) — based on Life Is a Dream by Pedro Calderón de la Barca
- Signor Rizzi kommt zurück (1963, TV film) — based on Mr. Rizzi's Return by Anthony Spinner
- Die Dubarry (1963, TV film) — based on the operetta Gräfin Dubarry
- Das wissen die Götter (1964, TV series, 4 episodes)
- Die Reise auf den Mond (1964, TV film) — based on the operetta Le voyage dans la lune
- Der Apoll von Bellac (1964, TV film) — based on The Apollo of Bellac by Jean Giraudoux
- Die Sakramentskarosse (1965, TV film) — based on Le Carrosse du Saint-Sacrement by Prosper Mérimée
- Die Troerinnen (1966, TV film) — based on The Trojan Women by Euripides, adapted by Jean-Paul Sartre
- König Lear (1967, TV film) — based on King Lear by William Shakespeare
- Cäsar und Cleopatra (1969, TV film) — based on Caesar and Cleopatra by George Bernard Shaw
- Maestro der Revolution? (1971, TV film)

=== Actor ===
- Second Hand Destiny (1949)
- Immobilien (1973, TV film)
- Die Kur (1978, TV series)

== Bibliography ==
- Giesen, Rolf. Nazi Propaganda Films: A History and Filmography. McFarland & Company, 2003.
