= The Foolish Virgin (1935 film) =

1935 German film

- Directed by: Richard Schneider-Edenkoben
- Written by: August Hinrichs; Walter Supper
- Produced by: Karl Ritter
- Starring: Rolf Wanka; Erika von Thellmann; Paul Bildt
- Cinematography: Robert Baberske
- Edited by: Herbert B. Fredersdorf
- Music by: Hans-Otto Borgmann
- Production company: UFA
- Distributed by: UFA
- Release date: 28 February 1935
- Running time: 94 minutes
- Country: Germany
- Language: German

The Foolish Virgin (German: Die törichte Jungfrau) is a 1935 German comedy film directed by Richard Schneider-Edenkoben and starring Rolf Wanka, Erika von Thellmann and Paul Bildt. The film's sets were designed by the art director Artur Günther.

== Cast ==
- Rolf Wanka as Anton Rabeling
- Erika von Thellmann as Johanna Rabeling - Antons Schwester
- Paul Bildt as Herr Faber
- Käthe Haack as Frau Faber
- Karin Hardt as Irmgard, ihre Tochter
- Hans Leibelt as Herr Leibel
- Lotte Werkmeister as Frau Leibel
- Günther Brackmann as Arthur, Irmgards Bruder
- Walter Ladengast as Erich Büchner, Künstler
- Günther Lüders as Tappe, Friseur
- Anneliese Impekoven as Rieke
- Charlie Kracker as Erich Büchner, Künstler
- Heinrich Schroth as Der Professor
- Liselotte Wahl as Die Tochter des Professors
- Hellmuth Passarge as Redakteur

== Bibliography ==
- Klaus, Ulrich J. Deutsche Tonfilme: Jahrgang 1935. Klaus-Archiv, 1988.
- Kreimeier, Klaus. The Ufa Story: A History of Germany's Greatest Film Company, 1918-1945. University of California Press, 1999.
- Waldman, Harry. Nazi Films in America, 1933-1942. McFarland, 2008.
