= Breakfast in Bed (film) =

1963 film

Frühstück im Doppelbett
- Directed by: Axel von Ambesser
- Written by: Ladislas Fodor
- Produced by: Artur Brauner; Hans Otto Schröder
- Starring: O.W. Fischer; Liselotte Pulver; Lex Barker; Ann Smyrner
- Cinematography: Richard Angst
- Edited by: Walter Wischniewsky
- Music by: Friedrich Schröder
- Production company: CCC Film
- Distributed by: Gloria Film
- Release date: 26 April 1963
- Running time: 93 minutes
- Country: West Germany
- Language: German

Breakfast in Bed (German: Frühstück im Doppelbett) is a 1963 German comedy film directed by Axel von Ambesser and starring O.W. Fischer, Liselotte Pulver and Ann Smyrner.

It was shot at the Spandau Studios and on location in Berlin. The film's sets were designed by the art director Hans Jürgen Kiebach and Ernst Schomer.

== Synopsis ==
The wife of a newspaper publisher grows sick of his frequent absences.

== Cast ==
- O.W. Fischer as Henry Clausen
- Liselotte Pulver as Liane Clausen
- Lex Barker as Victor H. Armstrong
- Ann Smyrner as Claudia Westorp
- Ruth Stephan as Cilly
- Edith Hancke as Mrs. Müller
- Loni Heuser as Melanie

== Bibliography ==
- Bock, Hans-Michael; Bergfelder, Tim, eds. (2009). The Concise Cinegraph: Encyclopaedia of German Cinema. Berghahn Books. ISBN 978-1-57181-655-9.
