= Hilde Volk =

Austrian actress

- Born: 16 May 1912; Vienna, Austro-Hungarian Empire
- Died: 16 May 1995 (aged 83); Spain
- Occupation: Actress
- Years active: 1935-1994 (film & TV)

Hilde Volk (1912–1995) was an Austrian actress who worked extensively on stage and in radio. Later in her career she attained wider recognition for her co-starring role in the ARD crime television series Sun, Wine and Hard Nuts. She appeared alongside her husband Erik Ode.

== Selected filmography ==
- Fruit Without Love (1956)
- Stefanie (1958)
- Ohne Mutter geht es nicht (1958)
- My Ninety Nine Brides (1958)
- What a Woman Dreams of in Springtime (1959)
- Wenn das mein großer Bruder wüßte (1959)
- The High Life (1960)
- Only a Woman (1962)
- Der Kommissar (1969-1976, TV series)
- Sun, Wine and Hard Nuts (1977-1981, TV series)

== Bibliography ==
- Hans-Michael Bock and Tim Bergfelder. The Concise Cinegraph: An Encyclopedia of German Cinema. Berghahn Books, 2009.
