= Walter Giller =

German actor (1927–2011)

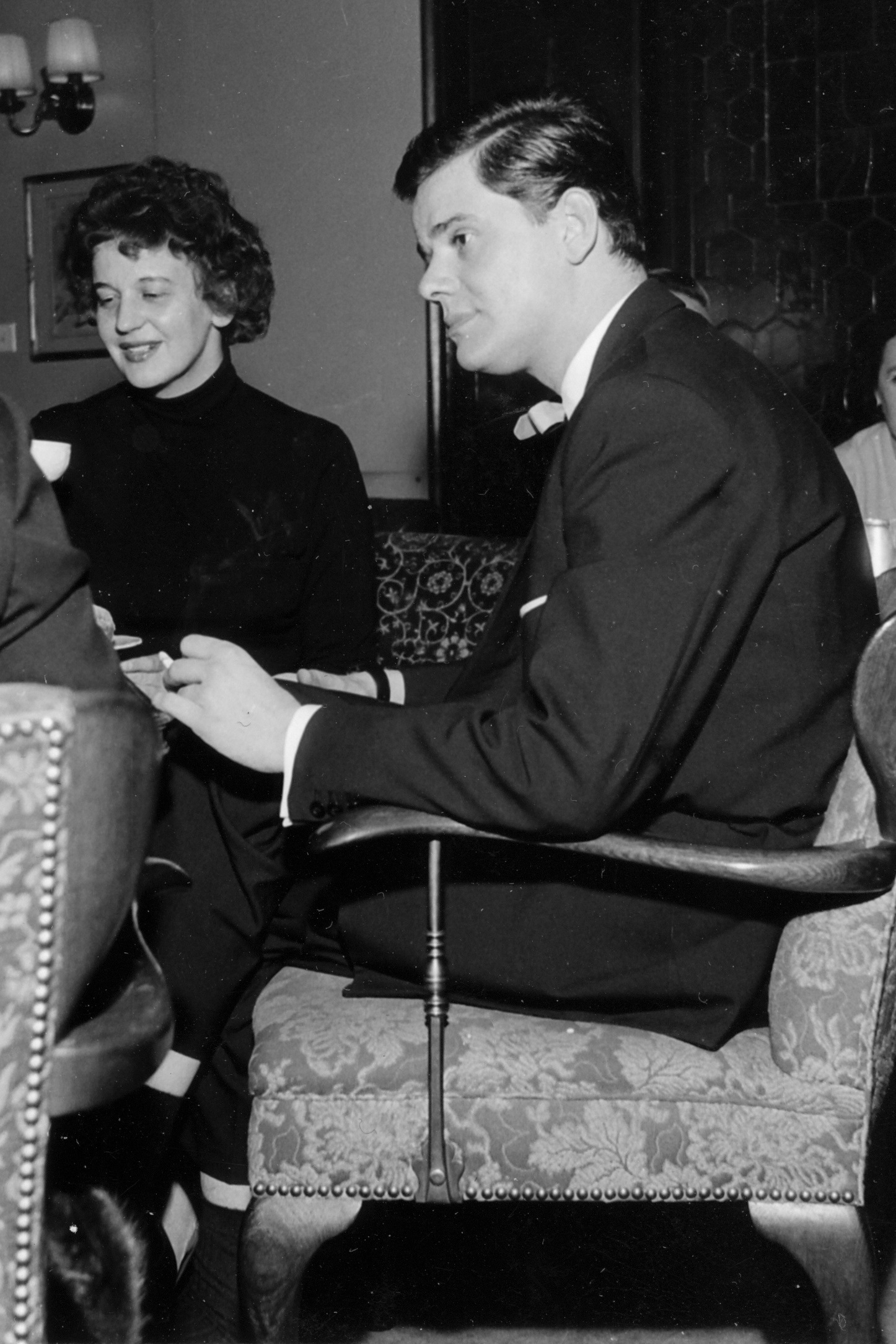
- Giller in 1955
- Born: 23 August 1927; Recklinghausen, Germany
- Died: 15 December 2011 (aged 84); Hamburg, Germany
- Occupation: Actor
- Years active: 1949–2009
- Spouse: Nadja Tiller (1956–2011) (his death)

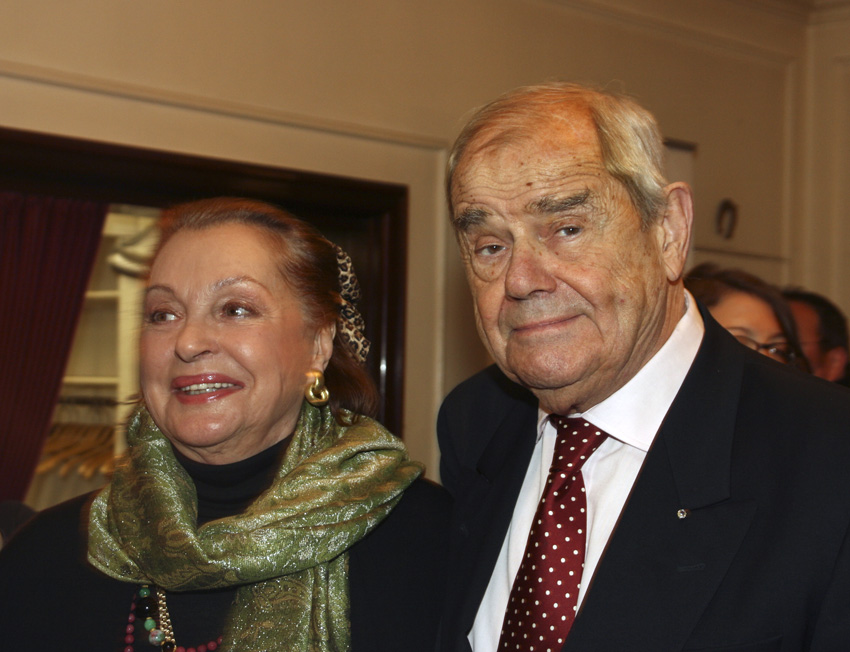
Walter Giller with wife Nadja in 2009

Walter Giller (23 August 1927 – 15 December 2011) was a German actor. He was very successful in the 1950s and 1960s, when he was often seen as a comedic leading man. One of his most successful and more serious roles was in Roses for the Prosecutor.

Giller was born in Recklinghausen. In 1956, he married actress Nadja Tiller; they had two children and appeared together in a number of films. The couple resided in Lugano, Switzerland for many years. In 2009, he was diagnosed with lung cancer. He underwent a major (but unsuccessful) operation. He died in Hamburg in 2011, aged 84.

== Selected filmography ==
- Artists' Blood (1949)
- Kein Engel ist so rein (1950)
- The Girl from the South Seas (1950) .... Lothar
- Insel ohne Moral (1950) .... Dicky
- Falschmünzer am Werk (1951) .... Conny Hauser
- Die Frauen des Herrn S. (1951) .... Platon
- Sensation in San Remo (1951) .... Ernst
- Wild West in Upper Bavaria (1951) .... 2.Aufnahmeleiter Schmittchen
- Primanerinnen (1951) .... Thomas
- The Colourful Dream (1952) .... Benno
- The Thief of Bagdad (1952) .... Ommar
- Der Mann in der Wanne (1952)
- Weekend in Paradise (1952) .... Ewald Bach
- The Day Before the Wedding (1952) .... Schurisch
- Fräulein Casanova (1953) .... Fritz Schromm
- Scandal at the Girls' School (1953) .... Paul Heller
- Irene in Trouble (1953) .... Dr. Konrad Berko
- Southern Nights (1953) .... Thomas
- Secretly Still and Quiet (1953) .... Peter Vondenhoff
- Hit Parade (1953) .... Walter Lorenz
- The Great Lola (1954) .... Dr. Hugo Bendler
- She (1954) .... Ypsilon
- Ten on Every Finger (1954) .... Fips
- Music, Music and Only Music (1955) .... Karl Zimmermann
- Swedish Girl (1955) .... Rolf
- The Three from the Filling Station (1955) .... Fritz
- Charley's Aunt (1956) .... Charley Sallmann
- The Bath in the Barn (1956) .... Peter Korff
- Ich und meine Schwiegersöhne (1956) .... Fred Windberg
- Black Forest Melody (1956) .... Luggi
- The Captain from Köpenick (1956) .... Willy Wormser
- Das Sonntagskind (1956) .... Bosty Mc. Millar
- Was die Schwalbe sang (1956) .... Rudi Winter, Student
- Nichts als Ärger mit der Liebe (1956)
- Spy for Germany (1956) .... Billy Cole
- Der schräge Otto (1957) .... Otto Schräge
- Das Glück liegt auf der Straße (1957) .... Felix Rabe
- Seamen (1957) .... Rolli
- The Big Chance (1957) .... Walter Gerber
- Drei Mann auf einem Pferd (1957) .... Erwin Tucke
- Spring in Berlin (1957) .... Peer Peterson
- Two Hearts in May (1958) .... Ralf Siedler
- Voyage to Italy, Complete with Love (1958) .... Hans Fichte
- Peter Voss, Thief of Millions (1958) .... Bobby Dodd
- Arena of Fear (1959) .... Dody, Musical-Clown
- Liebe auf krummen Beinen (1959) .... Daniel Mogge
- Du rififi chez les femmes (1959) .... Clochard (uncredited)
- Bobby Dodd greift ein (1959) .... Bobby Dodd
- Roses for the Prosecutor (1959) .... Rudi Kleinschmidt
- Peter Voss, Hero of the Day (1959) .... Bobby Dodd
- That's No Way to Land a Man (1959) .... Micki Flunder
- Heldinnen (1960) .... Just
- Ingeborg (1960) .... Ottokar
- The Nina B. Affair (1961) .... Holden
- Three Men in a Boat (1961) .... Jerome (Jo) Sommer
- Two Among Millions (1961) .... Paulchen
- Beloved Impostor (1961) .... Robert Bolle
- The Dream of Lieschen Mueller (1961) .... Autograph hunter
- The Burning Court (1962) .... Michel Boissand
- Liebling, ich muß dich erschießen (1962) .... Tom Fleming
- Snow White and the Seven Jugglers (1962) .... Norbert Lang, Hotelier
- The Threepenny Opera (1963) .... Beggar Filch
- The Conjugal Bed (1963) .... Father Mariano
- The Strangler of Blackmoor Castle (1963) .... Edgar
- Gripsholm Castle (1963) .... Kurt
- And So to Bed (1963) .... Polizist
- Encounter in Salzburg (1964) .... Kröner, Insurance Agent
- The Last Ride to Santa Cruz (1964) .... Woody Johnson
- Dead Woman from Beverly Hills (1964)
- Tonio Kröger (1964) .... Merchant
- Fanny Hill (1964) .... Hemingway
- Legend of a Gunfighter (1964) .... Spike Sunday
- DM-Killer (1965) .... Charly Bauer
- Shots in Threequarter Time (1965) .... Renato Balli
- Legacy of the Incas (1965) .... Fritz Kiesewetter
- I Am Looking for a Man (1966) .... Dr. Pleskau
- Killer's Carnival (1966) .... Karl (Vienna segment)
- The Pipes (1966) .... George Randy
- Action Man (1967) .... Maurice Labrousse
- Johnny Banco (1967) .... Inspector Jakubowski
- Love Thy Neighbour (1967) .... Forfatter Sven Gjeholm
- A Fine Pair (1968) .... Franz
- Klassenkeile (1969) .... Dr. Wagner
- The New Adventures of Snow White (1969) .... Hans I
- Gentlemen in White Vests (1970) .... Inspektor Walter Knauer
- Die Feuerzangenbowle (1970) .... Dr. Hans Pfeiffer
- Ein Käfer auf Extratour (1973) .... Ritchie
- The Maddest Car in the World (1975) .... Jean-Pierre
- Lady Dracula (1977) .... Herr Oskar
- Halali (1995) .... Dr. Dittmers
- Mein Vater, die Tunte (2001) .... Wanda
- Dinosaurier – Gegen uns seht ihr alt aus! (2009) .... Siegfried (final film role)
