= Fruit Without Love =

1956 film

- Directed by: Ulrich Erfurth
- Written by: Heinrich Oberländer
- Produced by: Artur Brauner; Wilhelm Sperber
- Starring: Gertrud Kückelmann; Bernhard Wicki; Claus Holm
- Cinematography: Hans Schneeberger
- Edited by: Kurt Zeunert
- Music by: Willy Mattes
- Production company: CCC Film
- Distributed by: Columbia Film
- Release date: 26 January 1956
- Running time: 104 minutes
- Country: West Germany
- Language: German

Fruit Without Love (German: Frucht ohne Liebe) is a 1956 West German romantic drama film directed by Ulrich Erfurth and starring Gertrud Kückelmann, Bernhard Wicki and Claus Holm. It was made at the Spandau Studios in West Berlin. The film's sets were designed by the art director Rolf Zehetbauer.

== Cast ==
- Gertrud Kückelmann as Barbara Kling
- Bernhard Wicki as Dr. Kolb
- Claus Holm as Georg Kling
- Paul Dahlke as Prof. Schillinger
- Erika von Thellmann as Frau Gordenberg, Barbaras Mutter
- Irina Garden as Anke
- Siegmar Schneider
- Alexa von Porembsky as Anna
- Kurt Weitkamp as Mano, Dr.Kolbs Assistant
- Liesl Tirsch as Donna Pilar
- Hilde Volk as Edith Keppler
- Ruth Nimbach
- Alfred Cogho as Dr.Renner, Dr.Kolbs Assistant
- Stanislav as Frederico
- Lou Seitz
- Walter Werner

== Bibliography ==
- Bock, Hans-Michael & Bergfelder, Tim. The Concise CineGraph. Encyclopedia of German Cinema. Berghahn Books, 2009.
