= Scandal at the Girls' School =

1953 film

- Directed by: Erich Kobler
- Written by: Hans Fritz Beckmann
- Produced by: Anton Schelkopf
- Starring: Walter Giller; Günther Lüders; Joachim Brennecke
- Cinematography: Josef Illig
- Edited by: Anneliese Schönnenbeck
- Music by: Franz Grothe
- Production company: Oska-Film
- Distributed by: Union-Film
- Release date: 5 February 1953
- Running time: 98 minutes
- Country: West Germany
- Language: German

Scandal at the Girls' School (German: Skandal im Mädchenpensionat) is a 1953 West German comedy film directed by Erich Kobler and starring Walter Giller, Günther Lüders and Joachim Brennecke.

It was made at the Bavaria Studios in Munich. The film's sets were designed by the art directors Ernst H. Albrecht and Arne Flekstad.

== Synopsis ==
Three men have to dress up in drag in order to hide away in a female boarding school.

== Cast ==
- Walter Giller as Paul Heller
- Günther Lüders as Josef Freudinger
- Joachim Brennecke as Ferdinand Dorn
- Marianne Koch as Marina von Leithen
- Erika von Thellmann as Pensionats-Direktorion
- Fritz Odemar as Fürst Maximilian
- Ernst Waldow as Oberst von Leithen
- Karin Andersen as Gerda
- Marianne Wischmann as Rita
- Adolf Gondrell as Obergardist Lukasch
- Petra Unkel as Mariechen Dorn
- Viktor Afritsch as Sekretär Stieglitz
- Helmuth M. Backhaus as Kommentator
- Käthe Itter as Frl. Schön
- Harry Hertzsch as Wirt
- Paula Braend as Anna Freudinger
- Sibylle von Gymnich
- Lilli Uhde
- Adalbert von Cortens
- Dietrich Thoms
- Wolf Harro
- Gitta Lind as Chansonette
- Georg von Block

== Bibliography ==
- Bock, Hans-Michael & Bergfelder, Tim. The Concise Cinegraph: Encyclopaedia of German Cinema. Berghahn Books, 2009.
