= Hans Leibelt =

German actor (1885–1974)

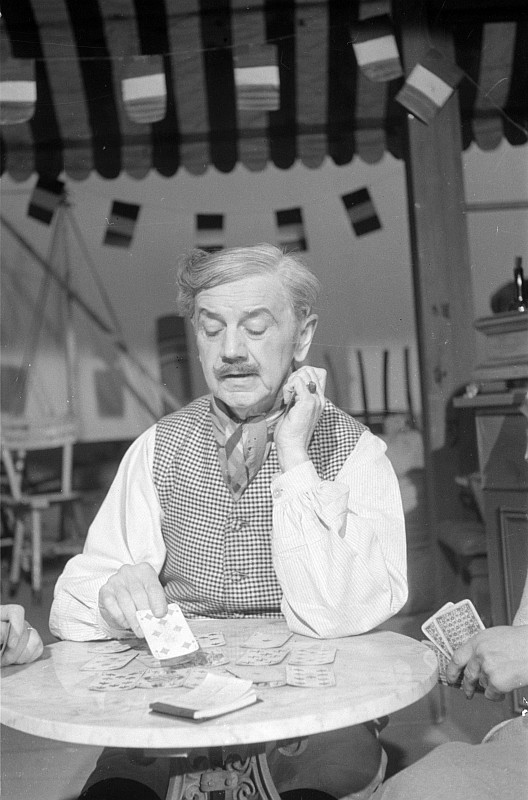
- Born: 11 March 1885
- Died: 3 December 1974 (aged 89)

Hans Leibelt (11 March 1885 in Leipzig, German Empire – 3 December 1974 in Munich, West Germany) was a German film actor.

== Selected filmography ==
- Heimliche Sünder (1926)
- The False Prince (1927)
- The Man in Search of His Murderer (1931) as Adamowski
- The Street Song (1931) as the inspector
- The Captain from Köpenick (1931) as Man at the advertising column
- You Don't Forget Such a Girl (1932) as Hahnen Sr.
- Night Convoy (1932)
- The Magic Top Hat (1932) as the stage director
- Love at First Sight (1932) as Count Prillwitz
- Contest (1932) as Brandt, Mercedes team manager
- Morgenrot (1933) as Bürgermeister von Meerskirchen
- Financial Opportunists (1934) as Klagemann
- Zimmermädchen... Dreimal klingeln (1934) as Otto Ruhland
- The Girlfriend of a Big Man (1934) as Reider the banker
- My Heart Calls You (1934)
- A Man Wants to Get to Germany (1934) as Morron, Manuela's advisor
- The Island (1934) as Bank Director
- Heinz in the Moon (1934) as Professor Ass
- The Old and the Young King (1935) as Knobelsdorf
- The Foolish Virgin (1935) as Herr Leibel
- The Blonde Carmen (1935) as Max Kruse
- Die Werft zum Grauen Hecht (1935) as Werftbesitzer Liebenow
- Stradivari (1935) as Professor Hoefer
- The Royal Waltz (1935) as Minister Doenniges
- The Green Domino (1935) as Justizrat Lorenz
- The Higher Command (1935) as Mayor Stappenbeck
- Savoy Hotel 217 (1936) as Untersuchungsrichter
- Inkognito (1936) as Severins Diener Hannibald Williges
- Männer vor der Ehe (1936) as Heinrich Rothe - Fabriksbesitzer
- A Wedding Dream (1936) as Graf Morotschin
- A Woman of No Importance (1936) as Lord Illingworth Senior
- Back in the Country (1936) as Commissioner Freimut
- Thunder, Lightning and Sunshine (1936) as Jacob Greizinger
- The Night With the Emperor (1936) as Bürgermeister von Erfurt
- Under Blazing Heavens (1936) as Police Inspector
- Doctor Engel (1936) as Tierarzt Dr. Baumbusch
- Wie der Hase läuft (1937) as Pastor Piepenbrink
- Capers (1937) as Neville
- The Citadel of Warsaw (1937) as General Horn
- Signal in the Night (1937) as Schneblinger - Bursche von Auersberg
- Gewitterflug zu Claudia (1937) as Inspector Baeuerle
- My Friend Barbara (1937) as Andermann Senior
- Mystery About Beate (1938) as August Deinhard
- Between the Parents (1938) as Dr. Feldern, Rechtsanwalt
- The Secret Lie (1938) as Sam Milbrey
- The Girl of Last Night (1938) as Mr. Barrow
- Grossalarm (1938)
- The Great and the Little Love (1938)
- The Holm Murder Case (1938) as Kriminalkommissar Engel
- What Now, Sibylle? (1938) as Professor Fromann
- Eine Frau kommt in die Tropen (1938) as Konsul Carsten
- Schwarzfahrt ins Glück (1938)
- The Deruga Case (1938) as Dr. Klemm
- Dance on the Volcano (1938) as Prince Louis Philippe
- The False Step (1939) as Minister Wullesdorf
- The Green Emperor (1939) as Picard
- Woman Without a Past (1939) as Consul Willmann
- Fräulein (1939) as Hermann Schilling
- A Woman Like You (1939) as Watchman
- Der Stammbaum des Dr. Pistorius (1939) as Dr.
- Lauter Liebe (1940) as Herr Haeberling
- Casanova heiratet (1940) as Hans Brinkmann
- The Girl at the Reception (1940) as Karl Hartmann
- The Rothschilds (1940) as King Louis XVIII
- The Girl from Barnhelm (1940) as Count Bruchsall
- Friedrich Schiller – The Triumph of a Genius (1940) as Professor Abel
- Kora Terry (1940) as Bartos
- Herzensfreud - Herzensleid (1940) as Konsul Verhagen
- Small Town Poet (1940) as Von Lindau, Landrat
- Das himmelblaue Abendkleid (1941) as Kurt Haberland
- Carl Peters (1941) as Prof. Karl Engel
- Happiness is the Main Thing (1941) as Director Ardnt
- The Swedish Nightingale (1941) as Theatre Director
- The Gasman (1941) as the famous defense attorney
- Immer nur Du (1941) as Polizeikommissar
- Ich klage an (1941)
- Women Are Better Diplomats (1941) as Counsellor Berger
- Tanz mit dem Kaiser (1941) as Baron Teuffenbach
- Much Ado About Nixi (1942) as Barkas
- The Thing About Styx (1942) as Consul Sander
- My Friend Josephine (1942) as Herr Bauer
- A Waltz with You (1943) as Direktor Wolter, vom neuen Operetten-Theater
- A Salzburg Comedy (1943) as Mr. Dirksen
- Die Wirtin zum Weißen Röß'l (1943) as Direktor Hartmann
- Titanic (1943) (uncredited)
- I'll Carry You in My Arms (1943) as Hans Wiegand
- Journey into the Past (1943) as Dr.Werner Birkner
- Die Feuerzangenbowle (1944) as Principal Knauer
- Die Zaubergeige (1944) as Prof. Becker
- The Roedern Affair (1944) as the high marshall
- A Cheerful House (1944) as Onkel Paul Hagedorn
- Peter Voss, Thief of Millions (1946) as Van Gelder
- Somewhere in Berlin (1946) as Herr Eckmann
- Raid (1947) as Hugo Lembke
- Marriage in the Shadows (1947) as Fehrenbach
- 1-2-3 Corona (1948) as Circus Manager Barlay
- An Everyday Story (1948) as Annelieses's father
- The Court Concert (1948) as Marshall von Arneck
- Artists' Blood (1949) as Schröder
- I'll Make You Happy (1949) as Herr Meinert
- Dangerous Guests (1949) as Director Schleinitz
- Beloved Liar (1950) as Director Berger
- Five Suspects (1950) as Dr. Lassens
- Blondes for Export (1950) as Intendant Hallerstedt
- My Niece Susanne (1950) as Gratin
- Mathilde Möhring (1950)
- The Lie (1950) as Martin Altenberger
- The Man in Search of Himself (1950) as Mr. Miller
- The Orplid Mystery (1950) as Cheflektor Kurt Beckmann
- Kissing Is No Sin (1950)
- Not Without Gisela (1951) as Werner the banker
- Miracles Still Happen (1951) as Prof. Nibius
- A Heidelberg Romance (1951) as William Edwards
- That Can Happen to Anyone (1952) as Buttermann
- House of Life (1952) as Kögl the portier
- Fritz and Friederike (1952) as President Meinhard
- Marriage for One Night (1953) as Hans Hoppe
- Heute nacht passiert's (1953) as Professor Meerwald
- They Call It Love (1953) as Carlos Schmidt
- The Postponed Wedding Night (1953) as Emil Dobermann
- The Divorcée (1953) as Pastor
- Under the Stars of Capri (1953) as Capitain Hagedorn
- The Charming Young Lady (1953) as Braun the chocolatier
- Dein Mund verspricht mir Liebe (1954) as Kommerzienrat Röder
- Bruder Martin (1954) as General
- Sonne über der Adria (1954)
- A Girl from Paris (1954)
- The Great Test (1954) as Direktor
- The Spanish Fly (1955) as Breilmann
- Let the Sun Shine Again (1955) as Dr. Retlinger
- Du mein stilles Tal (1955) as Pfarrer
- The Royal Waltz (1955) as Minister Wilhelm von Dönniges
- Lost Child 312 (1955) as Rechtsanwalt
- The Mistress of Solderhof (1955) as Professor Hilgen
- Charley's Aunt (1956) as Niels Bergström
- San Salvatore (1956) as Professor Weber
- Mädchen mit schwachem Gedächtnis (1956) as Mr. Turner
- Black Forest Melody (1956) as Mr. Morton
- Melody of the Heath (1956) as Moralt
- Little Man on Top (1957) as Petersen
- Marriages Forbidden (1957) as Franz Bruckner
- Der Bauerndoktor von Bayrischzell (1957) as Oberamtsarzt
- The Mad Bomberg (1957) as Professor von Wetzelstien
- Vater sein dagegen sehr (1957) as Minister Miesbach
- Es wird alles wieder gut (1957) as Regierungsrat Milbe
- Spring in Berlin (1957) as Barna
- Greetings and Kisses from Tegernsee (1957) as Mr. Hoover
- The Crammer (1958) as Headmaster Wiesbacher
- Peter Voss, Thief of Millions (1958) as Mr. Rottmann
- Wir Wunderkinder (1958) as Mr. Lüttenjense
- The Domestic Tyrant (1959) as the judge
- The Man Who Sold Himself (1959) as the burgomaster
- Liebe auf krummen Beinen (1959) as Sekretär
- Every Day Isn't Sunday (1959) as Dr. Börger
- Labyrinth (1959) as Padre Jeannot
- The Man Who Walked Through the Wall (1959) as Holtzheimer
- The Buddenbrooks (1959, part 1, 2) as Dr. Friedrich Grabow
- A Glass of Water (1960) as Thompson, Butler
- My Schoolfriend (1960) as Professor Strohbach
- The True Jacob (1960) as Eduard Struwe
- Die Botschafterin (1960) as Staatspräsident
- The Black Sheep (1960) as Bank Director James Conelly
- Im sechsten Stock (1961)
- Max the Pickpocket (1962)
- Black-White-Red Four Poster (1962) as Pfarrer
- Der 42. Himmel (1962) as Gerichtspräsident
- Das Liebeskarussell (1965)
- Once a Greek (1966) (final film role)

== Bibliography ==
- Hardt, Usula. From Caligari to California: Erich Pommer's Life in the International Film Wars. Berghahn Books, 1996.
- Shandley, Robert R. Rubble Films: German Cinema in the Shadow of the Third Reich. Temple University Press, 2001.
