= Playback (1962 film) =

British crime film by Quentin Lawrence

- Directed by: Quentin Lawrence
- Written by: Robert Banks Stewart
- Based on: Short story by Edgar Wallace
- Produced by: Jack Greenwood
- Starring: Margit Saad; Barry Foster; Nigel Green
- Cinematography: Bert Mason
- Edited by: Derek Holding
- Music by: Bernard Ebbinghouse
- Production company: Merton Park Studios
- Distributed by: Anglo-Amalgamated
- Release date: 1962
- Running time: 62 minutes
- Country: United Kingdom
- Language: English

Playback is a 1962 British second feature ('B') crime film directed by Quentin Lawrence and starring Margit Saad, Barry Foster and Nigel Green. It was written by Robert Banks Stewart based on a short story by Edgar Wallace, and was part of the Edgar Wallace Mysteries film series.

== Plot ==
Policeman Dave Hollis is a gambler and in debt. He falls for wealthy Lisa Shillack, who persuades him to murder her husband. After he has done so, Lisa frames him. He goes into hiding until he can murder her too. When convicted, he reflects on his story.

== Cast ==
- Margit Saad as Lisa Shillack
- Barry Foster as Dave Hollis
- Victor Platt as Inspector Gorman
- Dinsdale Landen as Joe Ross
- George Pravda as Simon Shillack
- Nigel Green as Ralph Monk
- Jerold Wells as Inspector Parkes
- Grace Arnold as Miss Wilson
- Donald Tandy as Police Sergeant
- Kenneth Fortescue as first tennis player
- Peter Stephens as first drunk
- Barry Warren as second tennis player
- Billy Milton as second drunk
- Peter Thomas as Constable Wilkie
- Edgar Driver as porter
- Edward Davies as waiter
- Dickie Owen as waiter
- June Murphy as first waitress
- Tamara Hinchco as second waitress
- Arch Taylor as doorman
- Monti DeLyle as croupier

== Production ==
It was made at Merton Park Studios, with sets designed by the art director Peter Mullins.

== Reception ==
The Monthly Film Bulletin wrote: "This biography of the downfall of an ambitious and conscientious young policeman is rather too predictable, and shows little sign of the Edgar Wallace hallmark (it must indeed be a minor and little-known work). It is efficiently enough played, but achieves little conviction, emerging as one of the less successful of the series."
