= One Woman Is Not Enough? =

1955 film

- Directed by: Ulrich Erfurth
- Written by: Michael Graf Soltikow (novel); Frank Dimen; Erich Ebermayer; Ulrich Erfurth
- Produced by: Willie Hoffmann-Andersen
- Starring: Hilde Krahl; Hans Söhnker; Rudolf Forster
- Cinematography: Werner Krien
- Edited by: Walter Wischniewsky
- Music by: Peter Igelhoff
- Production company: Apollo-Film
- Distributed by: Deutsche London-Film
- Release date: 8 August 1955
- Running time: 93 minutes
- Country: West Germany
- Language: German

One Woman Is Not Enough? (German: Eine Frau genügt nicht?) is a 1955 West German drama film directed by Ulrich Erfurth and starring Hilde Krahl, Hans Söhnker and Rudolf Forster. It was shot at the Tempelhof Studios in West Berlin and on location in Munich and around Lake Starnberg. The film's sets were designed by the art directors Erich Kettelhut and Johannes Ott.

== Synopsis ==
After a number of years of marriage, which remains childless, Ernst Vossberg has an affair with his secretary Renate and gets her pregnant. She then confronts his wife Maria and demands she divorce him. Maria refuses and sometime later, after the mistress has given birth, they physically confront each other and Renate is killed. Maria then faces a trial for murder.

== Cast ==
- Hilde Krahl as Maria Vossberg
- Hans Söhnker as Ernst Vossberg
- Rudolf Forster as Justizrat Dr. Kern
- Paul Hörbiger as Spielwaren-Ladenbesitzer Schratt
- Hans Reiser as Dr. Stefan Mertens
- Walther Süssenguth as Rechtsanwalt Dr. Körfer
- Heliane Bei as Renate Reinhard
- Annie Rosar as Frau Huber, Wirtschafterin
- Susi Nicoletti as Madame Colette
- Herbert Hübner as Generaldirektor Oppert
- Lola Müthel as Juliane, seine Frau
- Käthe Haack as Frau Wind, Geschworene
- Ernst Stahl-Nachbaur as Dr. Dickreiter
- Marina Ried as Frau Dr. Schultz, Geschworene
- Alice Treff as Mirjam Block, Privatdozentin
- Ralph Lothar as Landesgerichtsdirektor
- Elise Aulinger as Die Weinthaler-Bäuerin
- Beppo Brem as Portier im Gericht
- Edith Schollwer as Frau Schratt
- Stanislav Ledinek as Friseur Wenzier
- Kurt Pratsch-Kaufmann as Reporter
- Erika Peters as Friseuse
- Fritz Wagner as Junger Assessor
- Inge Wolffberg as Dame im Spielwarenladen
- Anneliese Würtz as Scheuerfrau im Gericht

== Bibliography ==
- Bock, Hans-Michael & Bergfelder, Tim. The Concise CineGraph. Encyclopedia of German Cinema. Berghahn Books, 2009.
