= Have Sunshine in Your Heart =

1953 film

- Directed by: Erich Waschneck
- Written by: Fritz Eichler; Erna Fentsch; Walter Lieck
- Produced by: Ernst Hasselbach
- Starring: Carl Wery; Liselotte Pulver; Hans Hessling
- Cinematography: Otto Baecker
- Edited by: Ira Oberberg
- Music by: Albert Fischer
- Production company: Cordial-Film
- Distributed by: Europa-Filmverleih
- Release date: 20 February 1953
- Running time: 88 minutes
- Country: West Germany
- Language: German

Have Sunshine in Your Heart (German: Hab Sonne im Herzen) is a 1953 West German drama film directed by Erich Waschneck and starring Carl Wery, Liselotte Pulver, and Hans Hessling. It was shot at Göttingen Studios and on location in the Austrian village of St. Gilgen. The film's sets were designed by Gabriel Pellon and Sepp Rothaur.

== Cast ==
- Carl Wery as Der alte Grummel
- Liselotte Pulver as Fräulein Helm
- Hans Hessling as Herr Knäbich
- Otto Gebühr as Der Justizrat
- Tilo von Berlepsch as doctor
- Traute Servi as cook Erna
- Eugen Dumont
- Kurt Eberth
- Dieter Wehrand
- Urs Hess as Bruno, child
- Wolfgang Condrus as Männe, child
- Sieghard Henrici as Gori, child
- Migg Hess
- Katja Penkert as Gerda, child
- Rosmarie Rothauer as Rosmarie, child

== Bibliography ==
- Bock, Hans-Michael; Bergfelder, Tim, eds. (2009). The Concise Cinegraph: Encyclopaedia of German Cinema. New York: Berghahn Books. ISBN 978-1-57181-655-9.
