= Siegfried Breuer Jr. =

Austrian actor

- Born: Walter Breuer; 16 July 1930; Vienna, Austria
- Died: June 2004 (aged 73)
- Occupation: Actor
- Children: Jacques Breuer; Pascal Breuer
- Parent: Siegfried Breuer
- Relatives: Wolfgang Condrus (either brother or half-brother)

Siegfried Breuer Jr. (né Walter Breuer; 1930–2004) was an Austrian film actor. He was the son of the actor Siegfried Breuer.

== Filmography ==
Year	Title	Role	Notes
1952	Haus des Lebens		Uncredited
1952	Illusion in a Minor Key	Kurt	
1954	The Silent Angel	Andreas	
1955	The Dark Star	Christian	
1955	Die Deutschmeister	Korporal Wilhelm August ('Willy') Jurek	
1955	Du mein stilles Tal	Fred	
1955	Roman einer Siebzehnjährigen	Christian	
1955	Three Girls from the Rhine	Werner Schulenburg	
1956	The Stolen Trousers	Hans Wellner	
1956	Black Forest Melody	Fredy	
1956	Saison in Oberbayern	Franz	
1957	Marriages Forbidden	Ferdl Hitzinger	
1958	The Green Devils of Monte Cassino		
1958	Das verbotene Paradies	Thomas Sund	
1958	Polikuschka	Ignatz	
1958	My Sweetheart Is from Tyrol	Franz	
1960	Kapetan Lesi	Helmuth	
1961	Autofahrer unterwegs	Rudi	
1966	Call Girls of Frankfurt	Kriminalassistent Bosse	
1967	Kurzer Prozess	Vogel	

== Bibliography ==
- Fritsche, Maria. Homemade Men in Postwar Austrian Cinema: Nationhood, Genre and Masculinity. Berghahn Books, 2013.
