= A Very Big Child =

1952 film

- Directed by: Paul Verhoeven
- Written by: Fritz Peter Buch; Hans Otto Schröder
- Produced by: Franz Mattler
- Starring: Georg Thomalla; Angelika Hauff; Gardy Granass
- Cinematography: Fritz Arno Wagner
- Music by: Friedrich Schröder
- Production companies: Lux-Film; Norddeutsche Filmproduktion
- Distributed by: Panorama-Film
- Release date: 6 March 1952
- Running time: 108 minutes
- Country: West Germany
- Language: German

A Very Big Child (German: Ein ganz großes Kind ) is a 1952 West German comedy film directed by Paul Verhoeven and starring Georg Thomalla, Angelika Hauff and Gardy Granass. It was shot at the Göttingen Studios as well as on location around Wiesbaden and West Berlin. The film's sets were designed by the art director Erich Grave.

== Cast ==
- Georg Thomalla as Hans Hochberg
- Angelika Hauff as Ina Cornelius
- Gardy Granass as Liesel Kilian
- Karl Schönböck as Alexander van Straaten
- Erika von Thellmann as Tante Agathe
- Harald Paulsen as Hieronymus Benedikt
- Eugen Dumont as Bürgermeister
- Hans D. Bove as Professor Augustin
- Loni Heuser as Aline
- Kurt Vespermann as Vater Kilian
- Paul Verhoeven as Inspizient
- Doris Kiesow as Frau Becker
- Mila Kopp
- Horst Beck
- Waltraut Wieschendorff
- Axel Scholtz
- Theo Pracher
- Arthur Mentz

== Bibliography ==
- Martin Osterland. Gesellschaftsbilder in Filmen: Eine soziolog. Untersuchung d. filmangebots d. Jahre 1949–1964. Enke, 1970.
