= Beloved Impostor =

1961 film

- Theatrical film poster
- German: Geliebte Hochstaplerin
- Directed by: Ákos Ráthonyi
- Written by: Gregor von Rezzori; Charles Regnier
- Based on: La Prétentaine by Jacques Deval
- Produced by: Walter Koppel; Eberhard Krause; Gyula Trebitsch
- Starring: Nadja Tiller; Walter Giller; Elke Sommer
- Cinematography: Günther Anders
- Edited by: Caspar van den Berg; Ursula van den Berg
- Music by: Siegfried Franz
- Production company: Real Film
- Distributed by: Europa-Filmverleih
- Release date: 16 December 1961
- Running time: 88 minutes
- Country: West Germany
- Language: German

Beloved Impostor (German: Geliebte Hochstaplerin) is a 1961 German comedy film directed by Ákos Ráthonyi and starring Nadja Tiller, Walter Giller, Elke Sommer and Dietmar Schönherr. It is based on a play by Jacques Deval.

The film's sets were designed by the art directors Albrecht Becker and Herbert Kirchhoff. It was shot at the Wandsbek Studios in Hamburg with location shooting aboard the ocean liner SS Hanseatic.

== Cast ==
- Nadja Tiller as Martine Colombe
- Walter Giller as Robert Bolle
- Elke Sommer as Barbara Shadwell
- Dietmar Schönherr as David Ogden
- Loni Heuser as Mrs. Ogden
- Ljuba Welitsch as Celia Shadwell
- Rainer Penkert as Ship paymaster
- Frank Freytag as Mr. Stanford
- Stanislav Ledinek as Adam, bodyguard
- Manfred Steffen as Bernhard, bodyguard
- Kurt Zips as Caesar, bodyguard
- Edith Hancke as stewardess
- Hans Richter as Steward Pfister
- Kurt A. Jung as first steward
- Gert Segatz as second steward
