= What a Woman Dreams of in Springtime (1959 film) =

1959 West German film

- Directed by: Erik Ode; Arthur Maria Rabenalt
- Written by: Curth Flatow; Eckart Hachfeld
- Produced by: Artur Brauner; Horst Wendlandt
- Starring: Rudolf Prack; Winnie Markus; Ivan Desny
- Cinematography: Karl Löb
- Edited by: Kurt Zeunert
- Music by: Willi Kollo
- Production company: CCC Film
- Distributed by: Prisma Film
- Release date: 19 February 1959
- Running time: 99 minutes
- Country: West Germany
- Language: German

What a Woman Dreams of in Springtime (German: Was eine Frau im Frühling träumt) is a 1959 West German romantic comedy film directed by Erik Ode and Arthur Maria Rabenalt and starring Rudolf Prack, Winnie Markus and Ivan Desny.

The film's sets were designed by the art directors Emil Hasler and Walter Kutz. It was shot at the Spandau Studios and on location around Lake Constance.

== Cast ==
- Rudolf Prack as Johannes Brandt
- Winnie Markus as Elisabeth Brandt
- Ivan Desny as Pierre Bonvant
- Chariklia Baxevanos as Helga
- Claus Biederstaedt as Fritz Bergstadt
- Christine Görner as Madeleine Sommer
- Melanie Horeschowsky as Großmutter Brandt
- Roland Kaiser as Rudi Brandt
- Hilde Volk as Fräulein Rabe
- Kurt Pratsch-Kaufmann as Fahrer Otto
- Horst Keitel as Orchesterchef
- Monika Peitsch as Freundin von Helga

== Bibliography ==
- Bock, Hans-Michael & Bergfelder, Tim. The Concise CineGraph. Encyclopedia of German Cinema. Berghahn Books, 2009.
