= A Thousand Melodies =

1956 film

- Directed by: Hans Deppe
- Written by: Rolf Dortenwald; Hanns H. Fischer
- Produced by: Johannes J. Frank; Wilhelm Gernhardt
- Starring: Martin Benrath; Gardy Granass; Helmuth Schneider
- Cinematography: Fritz Arno Wagner
- Edited by: Hanna Meisel
- Music by: Willy Mattes
- Production company: Hans Deppe Film
- Distributed by: Neue Filmverleih
- Release date: 29 June 1956
- Running time: 90 minutes
- Country: West Germany
- Language: German

A Thousand Melodies (German: Tausend Melodien) is a 1956 West German musical film directed by Hans Deppe and starring Martin Benrath, Gardy Granass and Helmuth Schneider.

The film was shot at the Tempelhof Studios in West Berlin with sets designed by the art directors Willi Herrmann and Heinrich Weidemann.

== Cast ==
- Martin Benrath as Martin Hoff
- Gardy Granass as Barbara Hoff
- Helmuth Schneider as Thomas Hoff
- Bibi Johns as Irina Servi
- Heli Finkenzeller as Tante Dele
- Paul Henckels as Pasedack, Oberbuchhalter
- Anneliese Würtz as Mutter Hoff
- Ernst Waldow as Ernst Lauterbach
- Käthe Itter as Elisabeth Lauterbach
- Michael Chevalier as Felix Riemann
- Horst Gentzen as Albert Förster
- Ralf Wolter as Hugo Pähler
- Herbert Hübner as Hagebutt
- Erich Fiedler as Konzertagent Heimroth
- Kurt Klüsner as Schnauf
- Peter Cornehlsen
- Das Cornell-Trio as Sänger
- Edith Hancke
- Horst Kraft
- Michael Lengauer
- Heinz Petruo

== Bibliography ==
Lutz Peter Koepnick. The Cosmopolitan Screen: German Cinema and the Global Imaginary, 1945 to the Present. University of Michigan Press, 2007.
