= A Heidelberg Romance =

1951 film directed by Paul Verhoeven

- Directed by: Paul Verhoeven
- Written by: Willy Clever; Karl Peter Gillmann
- Produced by: Heinrich Jonen
- Starring: Liselotte Pulver; O.W. Fischer; Gardy Granass; Gunnar Möller
- Cinematography: Konstantin Irmen-Tschet
- Edited by: Ilse Voigt
- Music by: Werner R. Heymann
- Production company: Meteor-Film
- Distributed by: Schorcht Filmverleih
- Release date: 23 December 1951
- Running time: 97 minutes
- Country: West Germany
- Language: German

A Heidelberg Romance (German: Heidelberger Romanze) is a 1951 West German romance film directed by Paul Verhoeven and starring Liselotte Pulver, O.W. Fischer and Gardy Granass. The film set a template for portraying German-American relations.

The film's sets were designed by the art directors Paul Markwitz and Fritz Maurischat. It was shot at the Bendestorf Studios and on location in Heidelberg.

== Plot ==
While accompanying his daughter on a trip to Heidelberg, a wealthy American businessman recounts a romance he had with a local girl forty years before.

== Cast ==
- Liselotte Pulver as Susanne Edwards
- O.W. Fischer as Hans-Joachim, Prinz von Reiningen
- Gardy Granass as Fannerl Brückner
- Gunnar Möller as William Edwards jr
- Hans Leibelt as William Edwards
- Ruth Niehaus as Gabriele Attendorf
- Hans Reiser as Erwin Turner
- Margarete Haagen as Tante Amalie Brückner
- Paul Verhoeven as Detektiv Schulze
- Melanie Horeschowsky as Alte Fannerl
- Joachim Brennecke as Thomas Altendorf
- Franz Schafheitlin as Hotelbediensteter

== Bibliography ==
- Bergfelder, Tim & Bock, Hans-Michael. The Concise Cinegraph: Encyclopedia of German. Berghahn Books, 2009.
- Stephan, Alexander. Americanization & Anti-Americanism: The German Encounter With American Culture After 1945. Berghahn Books, 2005.
