= Spring in Berlin =

1957 film directed by Arthur Maria Rabenalt

- Film poster
- German: Frühling in Berlin
- Directed by: Arthur Maria Rabenalt
- Written by: Curt J. Braun
- Produced by: Karl Mitschke; Kurt Ulrich; Heinz Willeg
- Starring: Sonja Ziemann; Gerhard Riedmann; Gardy Granass
- Cinematography: Georg Bruckbauer
- Edited by: Klaus Eckstein
- Music by: Hans Carste
- Production company: Berolina Film
- Distributed by: Herzog Filmverleih
- Release date: 25 October 1957
- Running time: 101 minutes
- Country: West Germany
- Language: German

Spring in Berlin (German: Frühling in Berlin) is a 1957 West German romantic comedy film directed by Arthur Maria Rabenalt and starring Sonja Ziemann, Gerhard Riedmann, and Gardy Granass. It was shot at the Tempelhof Studios in West Berlin and on location across the city. The film's sets were designed by the art directors Hans Kuhnert and Wilhelm Vorwerg. Elsewhere in Europe the movie's more dramatic elements were emphasised to suggest a Hitchcockian suspense thriller.

== Cast ==
- Sonja Ziemann as Nicoline
- Gerhard Riedmann as Ferry Meister
- Gardy Granass as Heide Wolters
- Mártha Eggerth as Verena Illing
- Iván Petrovich as Michael Markoff
- Hans Leibelt as Barna
- Dietmar Schönherr as Hannes Delk
- Ernst Stankovski as Jovan Bendix
- Edith Hancke as Uschi Paulsen
- Fritz Wagner as Bankräuber
- Walter Gross as Kowalke
- Wolfgang Neuss as bank robber
- Waltraut Runze as stewardess
- Ralf Wolter as guide on the tour bus
- Harald Sawade as Captain
- Harry Tagore as on-board mechanic
- Willy A. Kleinau as Greek from Los Angeles
- Walter Giller as Peer Peterson
