= Peter Voss, Hero of the Day =

1959 film directed by Georg Marischka

- Directed by: Georg Marischka
- Written by: Curt J. Braun; Peter Dronte; Gustav Kampendonk
- Produced by: Kurt Ulrich
- Starring: O.W. Fischer; Linda Christian; Walter Giller; Peter Vogel
- Cinematography: Klaus von Rautenfeld
- Edited by: Hermann Haller
- Music by: Erwin Halletz
- Production company: Kurt Ulrich Filmproduktion
- Distributed by: UFA
- Release date: 22 December 1959
- Running time: 105 minutes
- Country: West Germany
- Language: German

Peter Voss, Hero of the Day (German: Peter Voss, der Held des Tages) is a 1959 West German comedy crime film directed by Georg Marischka and starring O.W. Fischer, Linda Christian and Walter Giller. It was a sequel to the 1958 film Peter Voss, Thief of Millions which had been based on the novel of the same title by Ewald Gerhard Seeliger.

It was shot at the Tempelhof Studios in Berlin, and on location in Nice, Morocco, Las Palmas, Singapore, Las Vegas and India. The film's sets were designed by the art directors Hertha Hareiter and Otto Pischinger.

== Cast ==
- O. W. Fischer as Peter Voss
- Linda Christian as Grace McNaughty
- Walter Giller as Bobby Dodd
- Peter Vogel as Prinz José Villarossa
- Ingmar Zeisberg as Dolly
- Peter Mosbacher as Baron de Clock
- Helga Sommerfeld as Mary de la Roche
- Ludwig Linkmann as Lawyer Perrier
- Ralf Wolter as Charley, der Jockey
- Ady Berber as Leslie aus Texas
- Stanislav Ledinek as Präsident
- Lucie Englisch as Haushälterin

== Bibliography ==
- Popa, Dorin (1989). O.W. Fischer: Seine Filme – sein Leben. Munich: Wilhelm Heyne. ISBN 978-3-453-00124-4.
