= Schmutziger Engel =

1958 film

Schmutziger Engel (USA: Imperfect Angel, UK: Dirty Angel) is a German film made in 1958, directed by Alfred Vohrer.

== Cast ==
- Peter van Eyck as Torsten Agast
- Corny Collins as Beate Schorlemmer
- Doris Kirchner as Norma Berg
- Adelheid Seeck as Erika Romayer
- Sabine Sinjen as Ruth
- Hans Nielsen as Direktor Schorlemmer
- Werner Peters as Kalweit
- Rex Gildo as Peter Utesch
- Edith Hancke as Gerti
- Ralf Wolter as Turnlehrer
- Wolfgang Hicks as Zeichenlehrer
- Ludwig Linkmann as Direktor Franke
- Helmut Peine as Schulrat Höhne
- Franz Schafheitlin as Untersuchungsrichter Wangen
- Robert Meyn as Strafverteidiger Dr. Dombos

== Censorship in Italy ==
When Schmutziger Angel was first released in Italy in 1959, the Committee for the Theatrical Review of the Italian Ministry of Cultural Heritage and Activities reviewed the film. In order for the film to be screened publicly, the Committee recommended the removal of the frames in which a female character exposed her breasts. The reason for the restriction, cited in the official documents, is that the sequence was considered to be offensive to decency.
