= Charley's Aunt (1956 film) =

1956 film

- Directed by: Hans Quest
- Written by: Gustav Kampendonk
- Based on: Charley's Aunt by Brandon Thomas
- Produced by: Karl Mitschke; Kurt Ulrich; Heinz Willeg
- Starring: Heinz Rühmann; Hertha Feiler; Claus Biederstaedt
- Cinematography: Kurt Schulz
- Edited by: Hermann Leitner
- Music by: Friedrich Schröder
- Production company: Imperial Filmproduktion
- Distributed by: Constantin Film
- Release date: 19 January 1956
- Running time: 89 minutes
- Country: West Germany
- Language: German
- Box office: 4.9 million DM

Charley's Aunt (German: Charleys Tante) is a 1956 West German comedy film directed by Hans Quest and starring Heinz Rühmann, Hertha Feiler and Claus Biederstaedt. It is an adaptation of the 1892 British play Charley's Aunt by Brandon Thomas.

It was made at the Spandau and Tempelhof Studios in Berlin. The film's sets were designed by the art directors Hans Kuhnert and Peter Schlewski. It was shot in Eastmancolor.

== Plot ==
Commercial Attaché Dr. Otto Dernburg travels to Germany from South America for business negotiations. His eye falls on the attractive millionaire Carlotta Ramirez. But first he visits his younger brother Ralf, who lives in an attic apartment with his friend Charley. The two are expecting the attractive Swedes Ulla and Britta, but are afraid of their strict uncle Niels. Charley's unknown aunt, who also wanted to come, apologized at short notice. But Britta and Ulla don't want to stay alone with the two men.

For the sake of his brother and to save the evening, Dr. Dernburg dresses up as Charley's aunt. The situation becomes increasingly complicated when Charley's father and uncle Niels show up. However, the fake aunt manages to placate both of them. Finally, the real aunt appears, who is none other than Carlotta Ramirez. At first she is very piqued because the wrong aunt is wearing the dress that Dernburg's butler had stolen shortly before. She embarrasses the fake aunt, but doesn't let her get caught. Dr. Dernburg drops his disguise only after the women have left. The next day, Carlotta shows up in the dress Dernburg wore the night before. She shows him that she saw through him, but doesn't hold grudges against him.

== Cast ==
- Heinz Rühmann as Doctor Otto Dernburg
- Hertha Feiler as Carlotta Ramirez
- Claus Biederstaedt as Ralf Dernburg
- Walter Giller as Charley Sallmann
- Ruth Stephan as Mona
- Bum Krüger as Peter
- Hans Olden as Wolke
- Ina Peters as Britta Nielsen
- Elisa Loti as Ulla Bergström
- Hans Leibelt as Niels Bergström
- Paul Hörbiger as August Sallmann
- Helmuth Rudolph as Consul general
- Hilde von Stolz as Consul general's wife
- Wolfgang Neuss as Head porter
- Ewald Wenck as Hotel concierge
- Wolfgang Condrus as bell boy
- Wulf Rittscher as Night club owner
- Wolfgang Völz as Police man

== Bibliography ==
- Bock, Hans-Michael & Bergfelder, Tim. The Concise CineGraph. Encyclopedia of German Cinema. Berghahn Books, 2009.
