= Silvia Reize =

Actress from sweden

- Born: 1 October 1948; Bern, Switzerland
- Died: 19 June 2012 (aged 63); Basel, Switzerland
- Occupation: Actress
- Years active: 1972–1998 (film & TV)

Silvia Reize (1 October 1948 – 19 June 2012) was a Swiss actress.

== Selected filmography ==
=== Film ===
- My Daughter, Your Daughter (1972)
- Steppenwolf (1974)
- Die Magd (1976)
- Baker's Bread (1976)
- Erika (1976, TV film)
- The Second Awakening of Christa Klages (1978)
- Goetz von Berlichingen of the Iron Hand (1979)
- Years Passed (1981, TV film)
- In the Belly of the Whale (1985)

=== Television series ===
- Der Strick um den Hals (1975, TV miniseries)
- Sun, Wine and Hard Nuts (1981)
- The Old Fox (1982)
- Die Pawlaks (1982)
- Beautiful Wilhelmine (1984)

== Bibliography ==
- Klossner, Michael. The Europe of 1500–1815 on Film and Television: A Worldwide Filmography of Over 2550 Works, 1895 Through 2000. McFarland & Company, 2002. p. 161.
