= Quentin Lawrence =

English film and TV director (1920–1979)

Quentin Lawrence (6 November 1920, in Gravesend – 9 March 1979, in Halifax, Yorkshire) was an English film and television director. He worked a long time for Associated Television (ATV).

An article about TV directors in The Guardian said he was "noted for the precision of his camerawork."

== Selected filmography ==
- The Trollenberg Terror (1958)
- Cash on Demand (1961)
- Playback (Edgar Wallace Mysteries series,1962)
- The Man Who Finally Died (1963)
- We Shall See (Edgar Wallace Mysteries series,1964)
- The Secret of Blood Island (1965)

== Producer ==
- The Ghosts of Motley Hall (1977)
