= The Big Chance (1957 German film) =

1957 film

- Poster
- Directed by: Hans Quest
- Written by: Janne Furch; Werner Eplinius; Aldo von Pinelli
- Produced by: Peter Schaeffers
- Starring: Walter Giller; Gardy Granass; Michael Cramer
- Cinematography: Willy Winterstein
- Edited by: Walter von Bonhorst
- Music by: Lotar Olias
- Production company: Melodie Film
- Distributed by: Herzog Filmverleih
- Release date: 26 September 1957
- Running time: 98 minutes
- Country: West Germany
- Language: German

The Big Chance (German: Die große Chance) is a 1957 West German romantic comedy film directed by Hans Quest and starring Walter Giller, Gardy Granass and Michael Cramer. Shot and set in Heidelberg, it was one of a series of Schlager music films made around the time.

The film's sets were designed by the art directors Dieter Bartels and Helmut Nentwig. It was shot in Agfacolor.

== Main cast ==
- Walter Giller as Walter Gerber
- Gardy Granass as Ruth Degner
- Michael Cramer as Manfred Hallersperg
- Wera Frydtberg as Erika Hallersperg
- Robert Freitag as Kaplan Sommer
- Loni Heuser as Henriette 'Henny' Hallersperg
- Käthe Haack as Anna Gerber
- Ernst Waldow as Tankstellenbesitzer Oskar Magenau
- Friedrich Domin as Bischof
- Peter Lühr as Studienrat Heinrich Gerber
- Bruno Fritz as Fabrikant Otto Hallersperg
- Johanna Hofer as Großmutter Degner
- Erna Sellmer as Wirtschafterin Luise
- Gisela Schlüter as Susi Viereck
- Harald Martens as Eugen Gerber
- Renate Danz as Lilli
- Klaus Behrendt as Klaus Pranner
- Willi Schaeffers as Theo Janicke
- Ernst Jacobi as Tommy Reichmann
- Willi Rose as Willi Baumann
- Lou Seitz as Frau Lehmann, Köchin
- Peter Vogel as Peter Fiedler
- Harald Dietl as Heinz
- Kurt Pratsch-Kaufmann as Conferencier
- Freddy Quinn as Freddy

== Bibliography ==
- Koepnick, Lutz Peter; Schindler, Stephan K., eds. (2007). The Cosmopolitan Screen: German Cinema and the Global Imaginary, 1945 to the Present. University of Michigan Press. ISBN 978-0-472-06966-8.
