= Margit Saad =

German actress (1929–2023)

- Born: Marguerite Saad; 30 May 1929; Munich, Bavaria, Germany
- Died: 7 August 2023 (aged 94); Munich, Bavaria, Germany
- Years active: 1951–1982
- Spouse: Jean-Pierre Ponnelle (m. 1957; died 1988)
- Children: 1

Margit Saad (30 May 1929 – 7 August 2023) was a German actress who worked largely in German film and television, with occasional English language appearances.

== Biography ==
Margit Saad was born in Munich, Germany, the daughter of a Lebanese linguist father and a German-language-teaching mother from Düsseldorf. She made her screen debut in Eva erbt das Paradies. In 1960 she starred in the British drama film The Criminal and followed it up with appearances in other British films and television programmes such as The Rebel (US Call Me Genius, 1961) with Tony Hancock, Playback (1962), an entry in the Edgar Wallace Mysteries series of second features, The Saint in The Saint Sees It Through (1964), and The Magnificent Two (1967) supporting Morecambe and Wise.

Saad appeared in an early 1966 episode of the American television espionage series Blue Light. It was edited together with three other episodes later in 1966 to create the American theatrical film I Deal in Danger, which includes her appearance.

Margit Saad died on 7 August 2023, at the age of 94.

== Selected filmography ==
- Behind Monastery Walls (1952)
- Southern Nights (1953)
- If I Only Have Your Love (1953)
- The Gypsy Baron (1954)
- Marriage Sanitarium (1955)
- Three Girls from the Rhine (1955)
- Three Birch Trees on the Heath (1956)
- Made in Germany (1957)
- A Piece of Heaven (1957)
- An American in Salzburg (1958)
- Peter Voss, Thief of Millions (1958)
- Paradise for Sailors (1959)
- Rendezvous in Vienna (1959)
- The Criminal (1960)
- The Rebel (1961)
- Playback (1962)
- I Deal in Danger (1966)
- The Magnificent Two (1967)
- The Last Escape (1970)
