= Fritz and Friederike =

1952 film directed by Géza von Bolváry

- Film poster
- German: Fritz und Friederike
- Directed by: Géza von Bolváry
- Written by: Felix Lützkendorf
- Produced by: Heinrich Jonen
- Starring: Liselotte Pulver; Albert Lieven; Margarete Haagen
- Cinematography: Ted Kornowicz; Herbert Körner
- Edited by: Ilse Voigt
- Music by: Lotar Olias
- Production companies: Fama-Film; Meteor-Film
- Distributed by: Europa-Filmverleih
- Release date: 25 September 1952
- Running time: 94 minutes
- Country: West Germany
- Language: German

Fritz and Friederike (German: Fritz und Friederike) is a 1952 West German comedy film directed by Géza von Bolváry and starring Liselotte Pulver, Albert Lieven, and Margarete Haagen. It was made at the Wiesbaden Studios in Hesse. The film's sets were designed by the art directors Heinrich Beisenherz and Alfred Bütow.

== Plot ==
Mönchheim, owner of a riding school, had his ward Friederike raised to become a "Fritz" according to strictly male standards. This female Fritz can ride horses and is adept at fencing, swearing and drinking. He even wins a chase race against cavalry officer Henry de Voss.

With a heavy heart Friederike is then sent to a girls' boarding school by her uncle. There she causes all sorts of confusion and flees disguised as a boy. She smuggles herself into a barracks of the operetta-like Sonn-Schein-Armee, which, among other things, is equipped with individual women's service. There she meets her tournament opponent again, who falls in love with her when he accidentally sees her in women's clothing. He sees through her game and puts her in a number of tricky situations. So Friederike discovers her feminine side after all, so that her lover can win her over completely.

== Cast ==
- Liselotte Pulver as Friederike
- Albert Lieven as Henry de Voss
- Margarete Haagen as Oberin
- Erika von Thellmann as Fräulein Schwinger
- Loni Heuser as Berth, Feldwebel vom Frauenkorps
- Otto Gebühr as Mönchheim, Tattersallbesitzer
- Hans Leibelt as Präsident Meinhard
- Iván Petrovich as Baumann, Offizier
- Bum Krüger as Dr. Per Högstad, Armeepsychologe
- Ingrid Pankow as Monika
- Giselle Vesco
- Charlotte Matulla
- Helma Sagebiel as Sister Mary
- Heide Julich
- Cecile von Tucher
- Erna Sellmer
- Erwin Biegel
- Helmut Brasch
- Hans Schwarz Jr.
- Fritz Matthies

== Bibliography ==
- Knop, Matthias. Rote Rosen und weisser Flieder: die Blütezeit der Filmstadt Wiesbaden. Museum Wiesbaden, 1995.
