= Loni Heuser =

German actress (1908–1999)

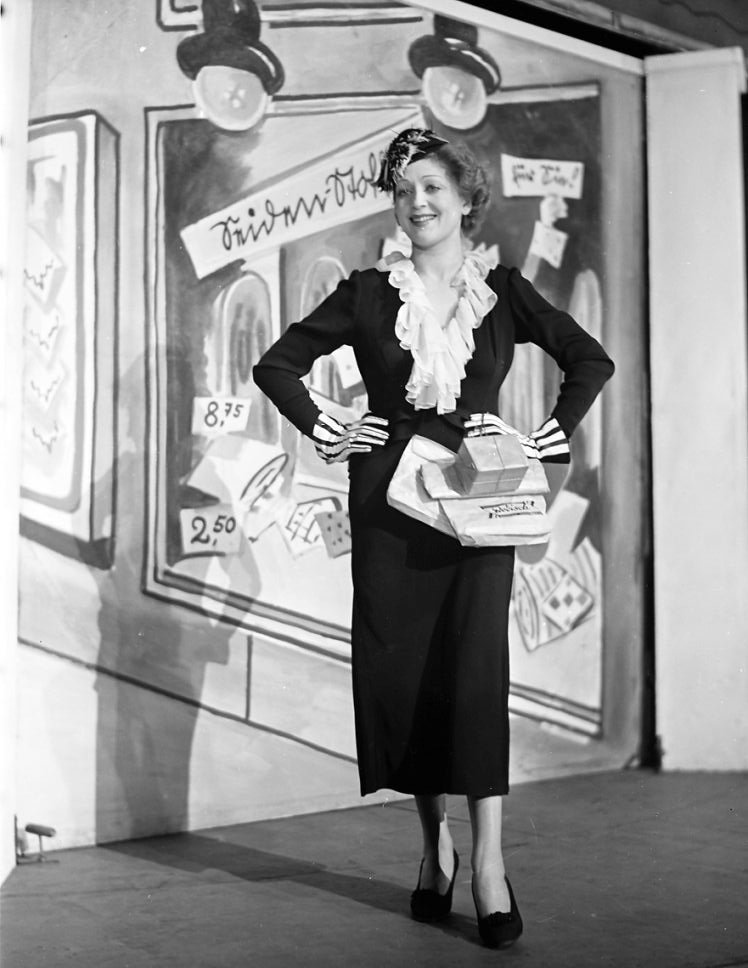
- Heuser in 1936
- Born: 22 January 1908; Düsseldorf, German Empire
- Died: 6 March 1999 (age 91); Berlin, Germany
- Occupation: Film actor
- Years active: 1932–1975

Loni Heuser (January 22, 1908 in Düsseldorf – March 6, 1999 in Berlin) was a German film actress.

== Selected filmography ==
- Liebe in Uniform (1932)
- The Hour of Temptation (1936) - Barsängerin
- Abenteuer im Grandhotel (1943) - Hella Schnappich
- Thirteen Under One Hat (1950) - Minna Wiese
- Theodore the Goalkeeper (1950) - Frau Bröslmeier
- Good Fortune in Ohio (1950) - Fanny Schulz
- Immortal Light (1951) - Diseuse
- Unschuld in tausend Nöten (1951) - Lola Rolfs
- Die Frauen des Herrn S. (1951) - Xanthippe
- The Dubarry (1951) - Lola Violetta
- Decision Before Dawn (1951) - Fritzi Kollwitz (uncredited)
- A Very Big Child (1952) - Aline
- Mein Herz darfst du nicht fragen (1952) - Nurse
- Season in Salzburg (1952) - Hedi Prittwitz
- Fritz and Friederike (1952) - Berth, Feldwebel vom Frauenkorps
- Hannerl (1952) - Frau Gerstinger
- Fräulein Casanova (1953) - Berta Schröder
- Heute nacht passiert's (1953) - Wanda Meerwald
- Grandstand for General Staff (1953) - Seine Frau
- Hit Parade (1953) - Frau Gabler
- Life Begins at Seventeen (1953)
- The Abduction of the Sabine Women (1954) - Frau Friederike Gollwitz
- The Faithful Hussar (1954) - Ernestine Wacker
- Annie from Tharau (1954) - Alma Möske
- Ten on Every Finger (1954) - Loni
- The False Adam (1955) - Luise, Meyers Frau
- Music in the Blood (1955) - Cilly Mainsburg
- Sonnenschein und Wolkenbruch (1955)
- Mädchen mit schwachem Gedächtnis (1956) - Babett Howard
- Holiday am Wörthersee (1956) - Tante Susanne
- Hurra - die Firma hat ein Kind (1956) - Tante Mathilde
- Tired Theodore (1957) - Rosa Hagemann
- Der Bauerndoktor von Bayrischzell (1957) - Charlotte Wille - Chansonette aus Berlin
- The Big Chance (1957) - Henriette 'Henny' Hallersperg
- At the Green Cockatoo by Night (1957) - Tante Henriette
- The Elephant in a China Shop (1958) - Bessi, Wirtschafterin
- Bimbo the Great (1958) - Frau Wille, Zirkus-Agentin
- Love, Girls and Soldiers (1958) - Gisela von Siebenstern, seine Frau
- So ein Millionär hat's schwer (1958) - Madame Sorel
- Wenn die Conny mit dem Peter (1958) - Fräulein Säuberlich
- The Blue Moth (1959) - Elvira del Castros
- The Merry War of Captain Pedro (1959) - Ludmilla Haberstroh, Marketenderin
- Als geheilt entlassen (1960) - Mutter Holubek
- Yes, Women are Dangerous (1960) - Elisabeth Myrtle
- Schlager-Raketen (1960) - Madame Laforte
- Das Dorf ohne Moral (1960) - Marianne Schulze-Hauser
- Three Men in a Boat (1961) - Carlotta, Grit's Mother
- Season in Salzburg (1961) - Hedi Pritwitz
- Beloved Impostor (1961) - Mrs. Ogden
- Ramona (1961) - Nannen
- Doctor Sibelius (1962) - Mrs. Golling
- So toll wie anno dazumal (1962) - Lola 'Lulila'
- The Phone Rings Every Night (1962) - Stiefmama Mary Meyer
- Breakfast in Bed (1963, TV Movie)
- If You Go Swimming in Tenerife (1964) - Christa's Mother
- The Girl from the Islands (1964) - Frau Liefke
- Freddy, Tiere, Sensationen (1964) - Frau Capello
- In Bed by Eight (1965) - Frau Dr. Diehlmann
- Donnerwetter! Donnerwetter! Bonifatius Kiesewetter (1969) - Madame Mathilda
- Ein dreifach Hoch dem Sanitätsgefreiten Neumann (1969) - Frau von Pfau
- Kommissar X – Drei goldene Schlangen (1969) - Maud Leighton
- Charley's Uncle (1969) - Frau Müggel
- Let It All Hang Out (1969) - Aida Spüler
- Klein Erna auf dem Jungfernstieg (1969) - Frau Heimann
- Wir hau'n den Hauswirt in die Pfanne (1971) - Frau Möbius
- Willi Manages the Whole Thing (1972) - Cosima Schulze
