= Rendezvous in Vienna (1959 film) =

1959 film

- Directed by: Helmut Weiss
- Written by: Eberhard Keindorff; Johanna Sibelius
- Based on: Rendezvous in Wien by Fritz Eckhardt
- Starring: Hans Holt; Margit Saad; Peter Weck
- Cinematography: Günther Senftleben
- Edited by: Arnfried Heyne
- Music by: Franz Grothe; Heinz Neubrand
- Production company: Cosmopol Film
- Distributed by: Cosmopol Film
- Release date: 8 January 1959
- Running time: 94 minutes
- Country: Austria
- Language: German

Rendezvous in Vienna (German: Rendezvous in Wien) is a 1959 Austrian comedy film directed by Helmut Weiss and starring Hans Holt, Margit Saad and Peter Weck. It was shot in Agfacolor at the Rosenhügel Studios in Vienna. The film's sets were designed by the art directors Hertha Hareiter and Otto Pischinger. In West Germany it was known by the alternative title Whisky, Wodka, Wienerin.

== Cast ==
- Hans Holt as Alexander 'Xandl' Marhold
- Margit Saad as Beate, seine Frau
- Peter Weck as Robert 'Bobby' - sein Sohn aus 2. Ehe
- Peer Schmidt as Alexander - sein Sohn aus 1. Ehe
- Susi Nicoletti as Milli
- Edith Elmay as Heidi
- Josef Meinrad as Ferdinand Windberger - Legationsrat
- Bob Martin as Sänger, Himself
- Ernie Bieler as Sängerin, Herself
- Hans Schmidt as Sänger, Himself

== Bibliography ==
- Goble, Alan. The Complete Index to Literary Sources in Film. Walter de Gruyter, 1999.
- Holler, Gerd . Josef Meinrad: "Da streiten sich de Leut herum ...". Amalthea, 1995.
- Von Dassanowsky, Robert. Austrian Cinema. McFarland & Co, 2005.
