= Gardy Granass =

German actress (born 1930)

- Born: 7 January 1930 (age 96); Berlin, Germany
- Other name: Hildegard Erika Charlotte Granass
- Occupation: Actress
- Years active: 1949-1989

Gardy Granass (born 7 January 1930) is a retired German actress. She appeared in around forty films and television series, after making her screen debut in Tromba (1949). In 1953 she appeared in Praterherzen based on a Hans Schubert play.

== Selected filmography ==
- Tromba (1949)
- A Heidelberg Romance (1951)
- A Very Big Child (1952)
- Red Roses, Red Lips, Red Wine (1953)
- My Leopold (1955)
- Three Girls from the Rhine (1955)
- The Happy Village (1955)
- Si tous les gars du monde (1956)
- The Model Husband (1956)
- Die Christel von der Post (1956)
- Black Forest Melody (1956)
- A Thousand Melodies (1956)
- Drei Mann auf einem Pferd (1957)
- The Big Chance (1957)
- Spring in Berlin (1957)
- When the Heath Is in Bloom (1960)
- Das Halstuch (1962, TV miniseries)

== Bibliography ==
- Goble, Alan. The Complete Index to Literary Sources in Film. Walter de Gruyter, 1999.
