= Carl Wery =

German actor

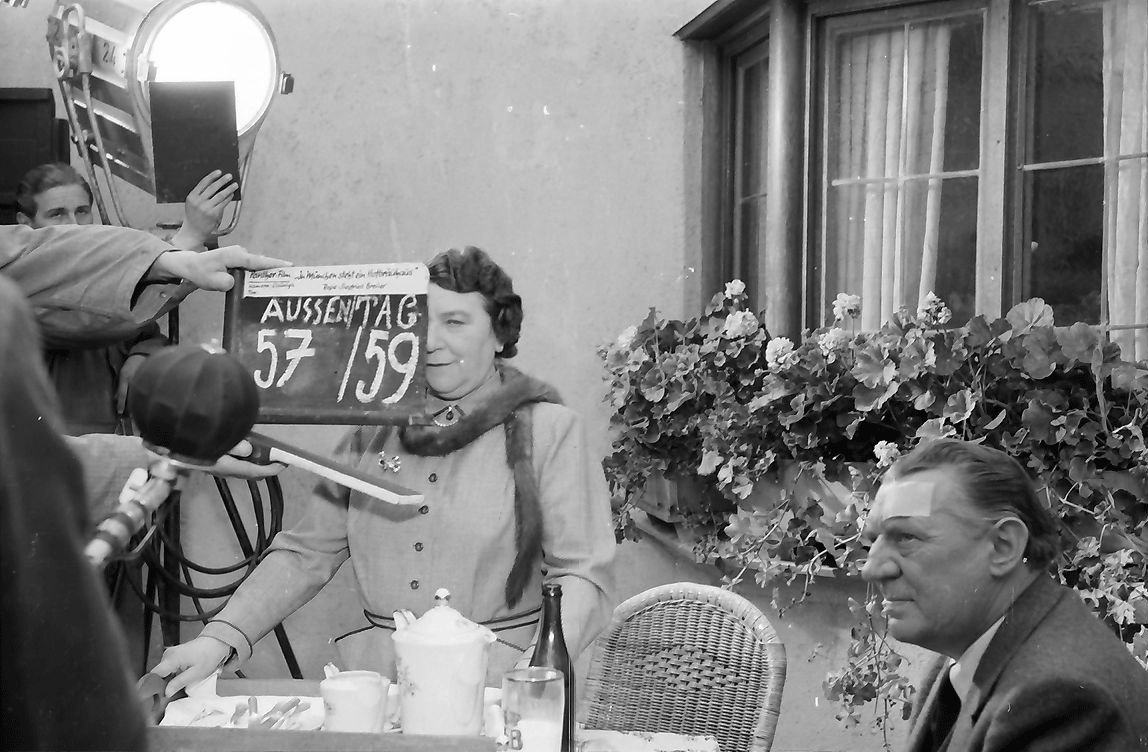
Carl Wery

Carl Sebastian Martin Wery (born Wery de Lemans; 7 August 1897 in Trostberg, Upper Bavaria – 14 March 1975 in Munich) was a German actor.

== Selected filmography ==
- No Day Without You (1933)
- Anna and Elizabeth (1933) - Annas Vater
- Drei Kaiserjäger (1933) - Berghofer, Wirt
- The Royal Waltz (1935) - Brandmeyer
- Weltraumschiff I startet (1937, Short) - Commodore Hardt (the film project had started in 1937; titled "Weltraumschiff 18")
- Water for Canitoga (1939) - Westbrook
- Fasching (1939) - Bildhauer Balthasar Huber
- Gold in New Frisco (1939) - McKinley
- The Eternal Spring (1940) - Sprecher der Bauern
- Enemies (1940) - Martin
- What Does Brigitte Want? (1941) - Generaldirektor Boller
- Venus on Trial (1941) - Der Oberstaatsanwalt
- Comrades (1941) - General von York
- Alarmstufe V (1941)
- The Sold Grandfather (1942) - Vater Kreithofer
- The Little Residence (1942) - Dr. Werner
- A Salzburg Comedy (1943) - Der Tourist mit dem Fernglas
- Via Mala (1945) - Jonas Lauretz
- Frau Holle (1948)
- Tromba (1949) - Eric Jensen, Zirkusregisseur
- Die seltsame Geschichte des Brandner Kaspar (1949) - Brandner Kaspar
- Dr. Holl (1951) - Alberti
- Bluebeard (1951) - Herzog
- In München steht ein Hofbräuhaus (1951) - Gustl Wurzinger
- Desires (1952) - Sanitätsrat Dr. Falkner
- Heidi (1952) - Dr. Classen
- The Great Temptation (1952) - Medizinalrat Dr. Bosch
- Have Sunshine in Your Heart (1953) - Der alte Grummel
- A Heart Plays False (1953) - Professor Linz
- Ave Maria (1953) - Dr. Melartin
- Love's Awakening (1953) - Urban, Töpfer
- Consul Strotthoff (1954) - Professor Wegener
- Columbus Discovers Kraehwinkel (1954) - Merzheim, Uhrmacher
- Bruder Martin (1954) - Pfarrer von Siebenwiesen
- Heidi and Peter (1955) - Dr. Classen
- Jackboot Mutiny (1955) - Generaloberst Fromm
- San Salvatore (1956) - Althoff, Schriftsteller
- Ballerina (1956) - Dr. Brinkmann
- Black Forest Melody (1956) - Stettner
- Without You All Is Darkness (1956) - Roberts Vater
- Nina (1956) - Hofrat Lorenz
- Der Meineidbauer (1956) - Mathias Ferner
- Die Christel von der Post (1956) - Egon Hanke, Kriminalkommissar
- Der Bauerndoktor von Bayrischzell (1957) - Dr. Sebastian Doppelsieder
- Meine schöne Mama (1958) - Stiefvater Tim
- An American in Salzburg (1958) - Oreste Aldobrandini
- The Green Devils of Monte Cassino (1958) - Gen. Heidenreich
- The Elephant in a China Shop (1958) - Theodor Tanner, genannt TT
- Sebastian Kneipp (1958) - Sebastian Kneipp
- Nackt, wie Gott sie schuf (1958) - Pater Leonhard
- Court Martial (1959) - Stahmer sen.
- The Moralist (1959) - Krüger (uncredited)
- A Doctor of Conviction (1959) - Professor Ruge
- Uncle Was a Vampire (1959) - Il professore tedesco
- A Summer You Will Never Forget (1959) - Fürst Aufenberger
- Stefanie in Rio (1960) - Pfarrer Don Nicolo
- Twenty Brave Men (1960) - Nikolaos
- Mein Vaterhaus steht in den Bergen (1960) - Wilhelm von Hübner, Gutsbesitzer
- A Christmas Carol (1960, TV film) - Ebenezer Scrooge
- Frau Irene Besser (1961)
- Darling (1961) - Minister Mayer
- Trompeten der Liebe (1962) - Stadtpfarrer Ludwig
- Tales of a Young Scamp (1964) - Joseph Semmelmeier
- Aunt Frieda (1965) - Hauptmann Joseph Semmelmaier (final film role)
