= Melody of the Heath =

1956 film

- Directed by: Ulrich Erfurth
- Written by: Gerhard Biller
- Produced by: Gerhard Biller
- Starring: Carsta Löck; Martin Benrath; Kurt Vespermann
- Cinematography: Hans Schneeberger
- Edited by: Liselotte Cochius
- Music by: Conny Schumann
- Production company: Concordia Film
- Distributed by: Panorama-Film
- Release date: 5 October 1956
- Running time: 93 minutes
- Country: West Germany
- Language: German

Melody of the Heath (German: Heidemelodie) is a 1956 West German romance film directed by Ulrich Erfurth and starring Carsta Löck, Martin Benrath and Kurt Vespermann. It is part of the post-war tradition of heimatfilm, taking place on Lüneburg Heath. It was shot in eastmancolor.

== Synopsis ==
A young woman schoolteacher replaces an older male in rural Germany.

== Cast ==
- Carsta Löck as Luise Nettebohm
- Martin Benrath as Ulrich Haagen
- Kurt Vespermann as Brettschneider
- Ludwig Linkmann as Windewitt
- Heinz Engelmann as Dr. Martin Newiger
- Hans Leibelt as Moralt
- Antje Weisgerber as Hanne Brink
- Charlott Daudert as Klara
- Gustl Gstettenbaur as Sepp
- Richard Handwerk as Nissen
- Harald Martens as Jörg
- Franca Parisi as Manuela Moralt

== Bibliography ==
- Harald Höbusch. "Mountain of Destiny": Nanga Parbat and Its Path Into the German Imagination. Boydell & Brewer, 2016.
