= An American in Salzburg =

1958 film

- Directed by: Helmut Weiss
- Written by: Wolf Neumeister; Helmut Weiss
- Produced by: Heinrich Schier; Carl Wilhelm Tetting
- Starring: Bruce Low; Margit Saad; Carl Wery
- Cinematography: Franz Koch
- Edited by: Ferdinand Weintraub
- Music by: Herbert Jarczyk
- Production company: Tetting Film
- Distributed by: Union Film
- Release date: 31 January 1958
- Running time: 94 minutes
- Country: West Germany
- Language: German

An American in Salzburg (German: Ein Amerikaner in Salzburg) is a 1958 West German musical comedy film directed by Helmut Weiss and starring Bruce Low, Margit Saad and Carl Wery. It was made in Agfacolor with location shooting in Salzburg. The film's sets were designed by the art directors Heinrich Schier and Franz Bi.

== Cast ==
- Bruce Low as Sascha Reader, Sänger
- Margit Saad as Bessie Cooper
- Carl Wery as Oreste Aldobrandini
- Susi Nicoletti as Frau Coopers Hausdame
- Franziska Kinz as Fräulein Murr
- Rudolf Rhomberg as Signor Locatelli
- Ernst Schönle as Sebastian, Diener
- Arnulf Schröder as Dr. von Willemer
- Peter Niklaus as Tommy
- Hans Magel as Saschas Manager

== Bibliography ==
- Wottrich, Erika & Schiemann, Swenja. Fluchtlinien: Filmkarrieren zwischen Ost- und Westeuropa. Edition Text + Kritik, 2013.
