= Peter Voss, Thief of Millions (1946 film) =

1946 film directed by Karl Anton

- DVD cover
- German: Peter Voss, der Millionendieb
- Directed by: Karl Anton
- Written by: E.G. Seeliger (novel); Felix von Eckardt; Karl Anton
- Produced by: Kurt Ulrich
- Starring: Viktor de Kowa; Else von Möllendorff; Karl Schönböck; Hans Leibelt
- Cinematography: Eduard Hoesch
- Edited by: Johanna Meisel
- Music by: Werner Schmidt-Boelcke; Friedrich Schröder
- Production companies: Tobis Film; DEFA
- Distributed by: Sovexport-Film
- Release date: 27 September 1946
- Running time: 91 minutes
- Country: Germany
- Language: German

Peter Voss, Thief of Millions (German: Peter Voss, der Millionendieb) is a 1946 German comedy crime film directed by Karl Anton and starring Viktor de Kowa, Else von Möllendorff and Karl Schönböck. It was filmed between 1943 and 1945. It was based on the novel Peter Voss, Thief of Millions by E.G. Seeliger.

== Cast ==
- Viktor de Kowa as Peter Voss
- Else von Möllendorff as Polly Petterson
- Karl Schönböck as Bobby Dodd
- Hans Leibelt as Van Gelder
- Kurt Seifert as Petterson
- Fritz Kampers as Fritz Mohr
- Georg Thomalla as Max Egon Flipp
- Werner Stock as Dodds Sekretär
- Gustav Bertram as Sam Parker

== See also ==
- Überläufer
