= Peter Voss, Thief of Millions (1958 film) =

1958 film

- German: Peter Voss, der Millionendieb
- Directed by: Wolfgang Becker
- Written by: Ewald Gerhard Seeliger (novel); Curt J. Braun; Gustav Kampendonk
- Produced by: Heinz Willeg; Kurt Ulrich
- Starring: O.W. Fischer; Ingrid Andree; Margit Saad; Mara Lane
- Cinematography: Günther Senftleben; Klaus von Rautenfeld
- Edited by: Wolfgang Flaum
- Music by: Hans-Martin Majewski
- Production company: Kurt Ulrich Filmproduktion
- Distributed by: UFA
- Release date: 16 October 1958
- Running time: 110 minutes
- Country: West Germany
- Language: German

Peter Voss, Thief of Millions (German: Peter Voss, der Millionendieb) is a 1958 West German comedy crime film directed by Wolfgang Becker and starring O. W. Fischer, Ingrid Andree and Margit Saad. It was based on the 1913 novel Peter Voss, Thief of Millions by Ewald Gerhard Seeliger, which had been previously adapted into three films. The film was a popular success, and was followed by a sequel Peter Voss, Hero of the Day with Fischer reprising his role.

It was shot at the Bavaria Studios in Munich. Location shooting took place at a variety of settings including Lisbon, Rio de Janeiro, Mexico City, Tokyo, Hong Kong, Barcelona, Genoa and Marseille. The film's sets were designed by the art directors Hans Jürgen Kiebach, Hans Kuhnert and Karl Schneider. Originally Eddie Constantine had been intended to play the title role, but at the last minute his unavailability led to the casting of Fischer in his place.

== Plot ==
The titular character, who is in debt, tries to pay it off by winning the lottery, but is unable to produce the winning ticket. But all the people in his city, including the city's criminal underbelly and his creditors, are also after the ticket.

== Cast ==
- O. W. Fischer as Peter Voss
- Ingrid Andree as Barbara Rottmann
- Margit Saad as Marion
- Mara Lane as Monique
- Peter Mosbacher as The Baron
- Peter Carsten as Willy
- Henri Cogan as Otto
- Boy Gobert as Ramon Cadalso
- Hans Leibelt as Mr. Rottmann
- Ludwig Linkmann as Van Zanten
- Franz-Otto Krüger as Uhl
- Walter Giller as Bobby Dodd

== Bibliography ==
- Goble, Alan. The Complete Index to Literary Sources in Film. Walter de Gruyter, 1999.
- Popa, Dorin. O.W. Fischer: seine Filme, sein Leben. Wilhelm Heyne, 1989.
