= The Girl from the Islands =

1964 film

- Directed by: Bostjan Hladnik
- Written by: Volodja Semitjov
- Starring: Jane Axell; Gunnar Möller; Karl Schönböck
- Cinematography: Gerhard Krüger
- Edited by: Anneliese Artelt
- Music by: Christian Bruhn
- Production company: Piran-Film
- Distributed by: Gloria Film
- Release date: 16 October 1964
- Running time: 83 minutes
- Countries: West Germany; Sweden
- Language: German

The Girl from the Islands or Maibritt, the Girl from the Islands (German: Maibritt, das Mädchen von den Inseln) is a 1964 West German-Swedish comedy film directed by Bostjan Hladnik and starring Jane Axell, Gunnar Möller, and Karl Schönböck. It was part of an attempt by some German makers of comedy films of the era to be slightly more risqué.

== Production ==
It was shot on location in Yugoslavia. The film's sets were designed by the art director Heinrich Mager. It was shot using Eastmancolor. The Swedish actress Jane Axell was handpicked for the starring role, but after appearing in another German film Venusberg the same year she made only a few further minor appearances.

== Synopsis ==
A German businessmen is sent to Stockholm by his boss to secure an important contract, in the face of foreign competition. He discovers that the intended client has gone sailing round the Swedish islands and follows him. He becomes mixed up with a mysterious young woman named Maibritt, who eventually turns out to be the daughter of his intended client.

== Cast ==
- Jane Axell as Maibritt
- Gunnar Möller as Jochen
- Karl Schönböck as Claes von Born
- Loni Heuser as Frau Liefke
- Hubert von Meyerinck as Direktor Dingelmeyer
- Thomas Reiner as Mister Hotchkiss
- Sture Ström as Ralf
- Herta Konrad
- Rolf Arndt as Towarisch Populenko
- Lorley Katz
- Edgar Wenzel as Monsieur Duval

== Bibliography ==
- Reimer, Robert C.; Zachau, Reinhard (2017). German Culture through Film: An Introduction to German Cinema (2nd ed.). Indianapolis: Hackett. ISBN 978-1-58510-857-2.
