= Peter Voss, Thief of Millions (novel) =

1913 novel by Ewald Gerhard Seeliger

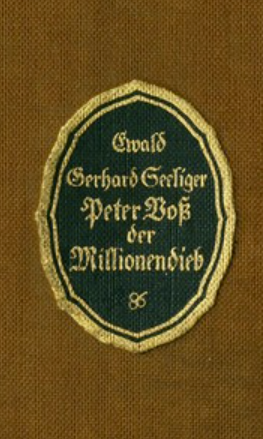
- Author: Ewald Gerhard Seeliger
- Original title: Peter Voss, der Millionendieb
- Language: German
- Genre: Comedy, Crime
- Publication date: 1913
- Publication place: Germany
- Media type: Print

Peter Voss, Thief of Millions (German: Peter Voss, der Millionendieb) is a 1913 comedy crime novel written by the German writer Ewald Gerhard Seeliger. The novel has been the basis for a number of films and one television series. The first adaptation was a 1921 silent film Peter Voss, Thief of Millions directed by Georg Jacoby. The 1959 film Peter Voss, Hero of the Day was an original story based on the character of the novel.

== Adaptations ==
- Peter Voss, Thief of Millions (1921 film), a silent film directed by Georg Jacoby
- Peter Voss, Thief of Millions (1932 film), a film directed by E.A. Dupont
- Peter Voss, Thief of Millions (1946 film), a film directed by Karl Anton
- Peter Voss, Thief of Millions (1958 film), a film directed by Wolfgang Becker
- Peter Voss, Thief of Millions (TV series), a 1977 television series

== Bibliography ==
- Kreimeier, Klaus. The Ufa Story: A History of Germany's Greatest Film Company, 1918-1945. University of California Press, 1999.
