= Erik Ode =

German actor and director

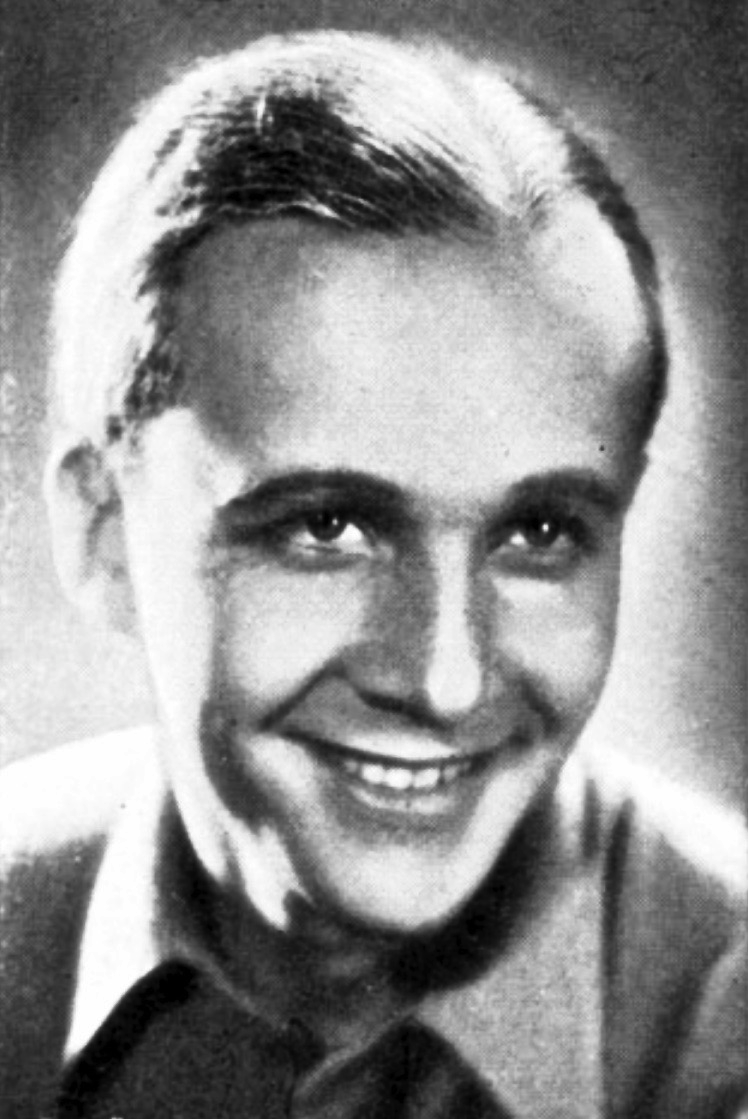
- Fritz Erik Signy Odemar, artist name: Erik Ode, 1910–1983
- Born: Fritz Erik Signy Odemar; 6 November 1910; Berlin, German Empire
- Died: 19 July 1983 (aged 72); Weißach-Tegernsee, West Germany

Erik Ode (born Fritz Erik Signy Odemar, 6 November 1910 – 19 July 1983) was a German director and actor who was most famous for playing Kommissar Herbert Keller in the German television drama Der Kommissar (The Police Inspector). He married actress Hilde Volk in 1942. Many years later they co-starred together in the TV series Sun, Wine and Hard Nuts.

== Selected filmography ==
=== Actor ===
- I.N.R.I. (1923) - Jesus als Kind
- The Cabinet of Doctor Larifari (1930) - Wolfgang Anglert, Chefredakteur
- A Student's Song of Heidelberg (1930)
- Sein Scheidungsgrund (1931) - Rudi
- Der Hochtourist (1931)
- Cadets (1931) - Kadett von Brenken
- He Is Charming (1932) - (uncredited)
- Cavaliers of the Kurfürstendamm (1932) - Niske
- Ja, treu ist die Soldatenliebe (1932) - Krause
- FP 1 antwortet nicht (1932) - Konrad Lennartz
- What Women Dream (1933)
- Season in Cairo (1933) - 3. Gigolo
- Glück im Schloß (1933) - Georg
- The Castle in the South (1933) - Tonio
- Gypsy Blood (1934) - Graf Poldi Stauffenstein
- Charley's Aunt (1934) - Charley Wykeham
- The Daring Swimmer (1934)
- The Sporck Battalion (1934)
- Jungfrau gegen Mönch (1934) - Dr. Peter Rivius
- Winter Night's Dream (1935)
- Forget Me Not (1935) - Peter Petermann, Dritter Offizier
- Hero for a Night (1935) - Jantschi, Reklamezeichner
- The Call of the Jungle (1936) - Kelly
- Victoria in Dover (1936) - Prinz von Oranien
- The Empress's Favourite (1936) - Fähnrich Alexander Platow
- Hot Blood (1936) - Husarenoffizier
- The Adventurer of Paris (1936) - Robert - sein Sohn
- Drei tolle Tage (1936) - Robert Ferry - Schauspieler
- Land of Love (1937) - Erster Beamter
- Unter Ausschluß der Öffentlichkeit (1937) - Wölfchen Hillberg
- Mystery About Beate (1938) - Schauspieler, 1.Etage
- Grossalarm (1938) - Zeitungsfahrer Alex
- Stärker als die Liebe (1938)
- Das Leben kann so schön sein (1938) - Dewitt, Reisender
- A Hopeless Case (1939) - Student
- Ich verweigere die Aussage (1939)
- Alarm at Station III (1939) - Egge, Zollpolizist
- We Danced Around the World (1939) - 1. Freund
- The Little Residence (1942) - Primaner Erich
- Tonelli (1943) - Der Sekretär des Theateragenten Bauer
- Eine kleine Sommermelodie (1944) - Gefreiter Otto Appelt
- Meine Herren Söhne (1945) - Apotheker
- Wir sehn uns wieder (1945) - Fritz Launer - Gefreiter
- The Berliner (1948) - Narrator (voice)
- Skandal in der Botschaft (1950)
- Czardas of Hearts (1951) - Gabor Takacs
- Just Once a Great Lady (1957) - Mann (uncredited)
- Liebe, Jazz und Übermut (1957) - Teddy Fisher, Künstleragent
- We Cellar Children (1960) - Aufgebrachter Vater
- Der Kommissar (1969–1976, TV Series) - Kommissar Keller
- Alexander Zwo (1972, TV Series)

=== Director ===
- Scandal at the Embassy (1950)
- The Land of Smiles (1952)
- Hit Parade (1953)
- Such a Charade (1953)
- Ten on Every Finger (1954)
- The First Kiss (1954)
- Music in the Blood (1955)
- Request Concert (1955)
- Heroism after Hours (1955)
- The Model Husband (1956)
- Just Once a Great Lady (1957)
- Und abends in die Scala (1958)
- What a Woman Dreams of in Springtime (1959)
