= Wolfgang Condrus =

German film and television actor

- Born: Wolfgang Breuer; 11 February 1941 (age 85); Berlin, Germany
- Other name: Wolfgang Breuer
- Occupation: Actor
- Years active: 1952–present (film )
- Parent(s): Siegfried Breuer; Lia Condrus
- Relatives: Siegfried Breuer Jr. (either brother or half-brother)

Wolfgang Condrus (né Wolfgang Breuer; born 11 February 1941) is a German film and television actor.

== Selected filmography ==
- Turtledove General Delivery (1952)
- Mailman Mueller (1953)
- We'll Talk About Love Later (1953)
- Have Sunshine in Your Heart (1953)
- Emil and the Detectives (1954)
- My Leopold (1955)
- Charley's Aunt (1956)
- The Priest of St. Pauli (1970)
- Group Portrait with a Lady (1977)
- Edith's Diary (1983)
- Mandara (1983, TV miniseries)

== Bibliography ==
- Susan G. Figge & Jenifer K. Ward. Reworking the German Past: Adaptations in Film, the Arts, and Popular Culture. Camden House, 2010.
