= Peter Voss, Thief of Millions (1921 film) =

1921 film

- German: Peter Voss, der Millionendieb
- Directed by: Georg Jacoby
- Written by: Georg Jacoby; Robert Liebmann
- Based on: Peter Voss, Thief of Millions by Ewald Gerhard Seeliger
- Produced by: Paul Davidson
- Starring: Harry Liedtke; Paul Otto; Mady Christians
- Cinematography: Frederik Fuglsang
- Production company: PAGU
- Distributed by: UFA
- Release date: 1921
- Running time: 420 minutes
- Country: Germany
- Languages: Silent; German intertitles

Peter Voss, Thief of Millions or The Man Without a Name (German: Der Mann ohne Namen) is a 1921 German silent adventure film directed by Georg Jacoby and starring Harry Liedtke, Paul Otto, and Mady Christians. It was released in six separate parts. A number of such serials were made during the early Weimar Republic, including Joe May's The Mistress of the World.

It is based on the novel Peter Voss, Thief of Millions by Ewald Gerhard Seeliger which has been adapted for the screen a number of times. The film's sets were designed by the art director Kurt Richter. It was shot at the Tempelhof Studios with extensive location filming taking place in Denmark, Italy, Spain, Morocco, and Dalmatia.

== Cast ==
- Harry Liedtke as Peter Voß
- Paul Otto as Alexander Voss
- Jakob Tiedtke as Frederik Nissen
- Mady Christians as Gert
- Lori Leux as Mabel
- Georg Alexander as Bobby Dodd
- Erich Kaiser-Titz as Prinz Abdul Hassan / Pol, Stierkämpfer
- Karl Harbacher as James Morton
- Edith Meller as Conchita
- Tzwetta Tzatschewa as Roschana
- Louis Brody as Bill Burns
- Heinrich Marlow
- Charles Puffy
- Hermann Picha
- Henry Bender
- Ferdinand von Alten
- Hubert von Meyerinck
- Gustav Botz
- Blandine Ebinger
- Albert Paulig
- Bruno Lopinski
- Paul Biensfeldt
- Paul Morgan
