= Modell Bianka =

1951 film

- Directed by: Richard Groschopp
- Release date: 1951
- Country: East Germany
- Language: German

Modell Bianka is an East German film. It was released in 1951.
