= Ewald Gerhard Seeliger =

German writer (1877–1959)

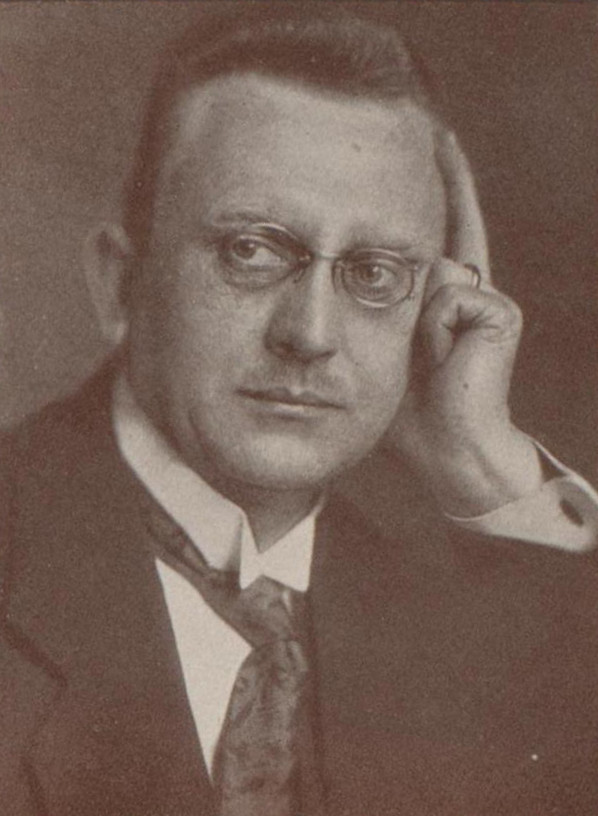
Ewald Gerhard Seeliger

Ewald Gerhard Seeliger (1877-1959) was a German novelist. Seeliger was a prolific writer who wrote novels mainly set at sea or around Hamburg. He is known for his 1910 novel England's Fiend about a German inventor who takes on the Royal Navy in a new airship, and his 1913 comedy crime story Peter Voss, Thief of Millions which has been adapted into many films. He is sometimes known as E.G. Seeliger.

== Bibliography ==
- Bridgham, Frederick George Thomas. The First World War as a Clash of Cultures. Boydell & Brewer, 2006.
