= List of West German films of 1958 =

List of films produced in Germany in 1958

List of West German films of 1958. Feature films produced and distributed in West Germany in 1958.

== A–Z ==
Title	Director	Cast	Genre	Notes
All the Sins of the Earth	Fritz Umgelter	Barbara Rütting, Ivan Desny, Paul Dahlke	Drama	
An American in Salzburg	Helmut Weiss	Bruce Low, Margit Saad, Carl Wery	Musical comedy	
Aren't We Wonderful?	Kurt Hoffmann	Hansjörg Felmy, Robert Graf, Johanna von Koczian	Comedy	a.k.a. Wir Wunderkinder
Arms and the Man	Franz Peter Wirth	O.W. Fischer, Liselotte Pulver, Ellen Schwiers	Comedy	Entered into the 1959 Cannes Film Festival
As Long as the Heart Still Beats	Alfred Weidenmann	O.E. Hasse, Heidemarie Hatheyer, Hans Christian Blech	Drama	
As You Like It	Ludwig Berger	Luitgard Im, Karl John, Käte Jaenicke	Comedy	
Begegnung in Singapur	Gustav Burmester	Michiko Tanaka, Agnes Fink, Hanns Lothar, Ernst Stahl-Nachbaur, Richard Lauffen	Drama	
Die Bernauerin	Gustav Rudolf Sellner	Maximilian Schell, Margot Trooger	Opera	
Besuch aus der Zone	Rainer Wolffhardt	Siegfried Lowitz, Werner Peters	Drama	
Biologie und Tennis	Michael Kehlmann	Max Eckard	Drama	
Black Forest Cherry Schnapps	Géza von Bolváry	Marianne Hold, Dietmar Schönherr, Boy Gobert	Comedy	
Candidates for Marriage	Hermann Kugelstadt	Beppo Brem, Paul Hörbiger, Gerlinde Locker	Comedy	
Confess, Doctor Corda	Josef von Báky	Hardy Krüger, Elisabeth Müller, Hans Nielsen	Crime	
The Copper	Eugen York	Hans Albers, Hansjörg Felmy, Horst Frank	Crime	
The Crammer	Axel von Ambesser	Heinz Rühmann, Gert Fröbe, Peter Kraus	Comedy	
The Csardas King	Harald Philipp	Gerhard Riedmann, Rudolf Schock, Elma Karlowa	Musical	
Death of a Salesman	Franz Peter Wirth	Kurt Ehrhardt, Robert Graf, Hanns Lothar	Drama	
Doctor Crippen Lives	Erich Engels	Elisabeth Müller, Peter van Eyck, Fritz Tillmann	Crime	
The Doctor of Stalingrad	Géza von Radványi	O.E. Hasse, Eva Bartok, Hannes Messemer	War	
Endangered Girls	Wolfgang Glück	Gerlinde Locker, Wolf Albach-Retty, Heinz Drache	Crime	
Escape from Sahara	Wolfgang Staudte	Hildegard Knef, Bernhard Wicki, Hannes Messemer	Drama	
Father, Mother and Nine Children	Erich Engels	Heinz Erhardt, Camilla Spira, Corny Collins	Comedy	
Freddy, the Guitar and the Sea	Wolfgang Schleif	Freddy Quinn, Sabine Sesselmann, Corny Collins	Musical	
Ein gefährlicher Mensch	Hans Lietzau	Werner Finck	War, Comedy	
Das Geld, das auf der Straße liegt	Egon Monk	Peter Lehmbrock	Drama	
Ein gewisser Judas	Oskar Werner	Oskar Werner	Drama	
The Girl from the Marsh Croft	Gustav Ucicky	Maria Emo, Claus Holm, Eva Ingeborg Scholz	Drama	
Girls of the Night	Maurice Cloche	Georges Marchal, Nicole Berger, Kai Fischer	Drama	Co-production with France and Italy
The Girl with the Cat's Eyes	Eugen York	Vera Tschechowa, Joachim Fuchsberger, Wolfgang Preiss	Crime	
The Glass of Water	Hans Lietzau	Hannelore Schroth, Martin Held, Helmuth Lohner	Comedy	
Glaube, Liebe, Hoffnung	Franz Peter Wirth	Ruth Drexel, Walter Kohut	Drama	
The Green Devils of Monte Cassino	Harald Reinl	Elma Karlowa, Joachim Fuchsberger, Harald Juhnke	War	
Heart Without Mercy	Viktor Tourjansky	Barbara Rütting, Hansjörg Felmy, Hans Nielsen	Crime	
I Was All His	Wolfgang Becker	Barbara Rütting, Carlos Thompson, Wolfgang Preiss	Drama	
I'll Carry You in My Arms	Veit Harlan	Kristina Söderbaum, Hans Holt, Hans Nielsen	Drama	
Iron Gustav	George Hurdalek	Heinz Rühmann, Lucie Mannheim, Karin Baal	Comedy	
It Happened in Broad Daylight	Ladislao Vajda	Heinz Rühmann, Gert Fröbe, Michel Simon, Siegfried Lowitz	Thriller	Co-production with Spain and Switzerland. Entered into the 8th Berlin International Film Festival
It Happened Only Once	Géza von Bolváry	Hans Albers, Stanislav Ledinek, Helga Martin	Drama	
Laila	Rolf Husberg	Erika Remberg, Edvin Adolphson, Isa Quensel	Drama	Co-production with Sweden
Liebelei	John Olden	Chariklia Baxevanos, Hans Moser, Ernst Stankovski, Peter Weck	Drama	
Lilli	Hermann Leitner	Ann Smyrner, Adrian Hoven, Claude Farell	Crime comedy	
Look Back in Anger	Leo Mittler	Horst Frank, Ingrid Andree	Drama	a.k.a. Blick zurück im Zorn
Mädchen in Uniform	Géza von Radványi	Romy Schneider, Lilli Palmer, Therese Giehse	Drama	Entered into the 8th Berlin International Film Festival
Man in the River	Eugen York	Hans Albers, Gina Albert, Hans Nielsen	Drama	
The Man Who Couldn't Say No	Kurt Früh	Heinz Rühmann, Hannelore Schroth, Siegfried Lowitz	Comedy	
Measure for Measure	Ludwig Berger	Ina Halley, Alexander Kerst, Herbert Tiede, Dorothea Wieck	Comedy	
A Midsummer Night's Dream	Ludwig Berger	Gardy Granass, Ina Halley, Alexander Kerst	Comedy	
Much Ado About Nothing	Ludwig Berger	Joachim Hansen, Jan Hendriks, Inge Langen	Comedy	
Munchhausen in Africa	Werner Jacobs	Peter Alexander, Gunther Philipp, Anita Gutwell	Comedy	
The Muzzle	Wolfgang Staudte	O.E. Hasse, Hansjörg Felmy, Hertha Feiler	Comedy	
My Ninety Nine Brides	Alfred Vohrer	Claus Wilcke, Horst Frank, Wera Frydtberg	Romance	a.k.a. My 99 Brides
My Sweetheart Is from Tyrol	Hans Quest	Marianne Hold, Joachim Fuchsberger, Walter Gross Musical comedy		
Nasser Asphalt	Frank Wisbar	Horst Buchholz, Martin Held, Gert Fröbe, Maria Perschy	Drama	
Night Nurse Ingeborg	Géza von Cziffra	Immy Schell, Ewald Balser, Claus Biederstaedt	Drama	
Peter Voss, Thief of Millions	Wolfgang Becker	O.W. Fischer, Ingrid Andree, Walter Giller	Adventure comedy	
Restless Night	Falk Harnack	Bernhard Wicki, Ulla Jacobsson, Hansjörg Felmy	War	
Romarei, the Girl with the Green Eyes	Harald Reinl	Carola von Kayser, Joachim Hansen, Leonard Steckel, Dominique Wilms, Werner Peters, Reggie Nalder, Kurt Meisel	Adventure drama	a.k.a. Romarei, das Mädchen mit den grünen Augen; Co-production with Italy
Rosemary	Rolf Thiele	Nadja Tiller, Peter van Eyck, Carl Raddatz, Gert Fröbe	Drama	
Scampolo	Alfred Weidenmann	Romy Schneider, Paul Hubschmid, Georg Thomalla	Comedy	
Der Schinderhannes	Helmut Käutner	Curd Jürgens, Maria Schell, Christian Wolff	Adventure	a.k.a. Duel in the Forest
Schmutziger Engel	Alfred Vohrer	Peter van Eyck, Corny Collins, Hans Nielsen	Drama	a.k.a. Imperfect Angel a.k.a. Dirty Angel
Sin Began with Eve	Fritz Umgelter	Willy Fritsch, Mady Rahl, Karin Dor	Comedy	American re-edited version The Bellboy and the Playgirls (1962)
A Song Goes Round the World	Géza von Bolváry	Hans Reiser, Sabine Sesselmann, Ruth Stephan	Musical	
The Spessart Inn	Kurt Hoffmann	Liselotte Pulver, Carlos Thompson, Günther Lüders	Comedy	Entered into the 1958 Cannes Film Festival
The Star of Santa Clara	Werner Jacobs	Vico Torriani, Gerlinde Locker, Ruth Stephan	Musical	
Stefanie	Josef von Báky	Carlos Thompson, Sabine Sinjen, Mady Rahl	Comedy	
The Street	Hermann Kugelstadt	Martha Wallner, Heinz Drache, Marina Petrova	Drama	
Stunde der Wahrheit	Gustav Burmester	Elisabeth Bergner, Heinz Klevenow, Albrecht Schoenhals, Hanns Lothar	Drama	a.k.a. Bilanz
Tageszeiten der Liebe	Imo Moszkowicz	Gertrud Kückelmann, Harald Leipnitz	Comedy	
Taiga	Wolfgang Liebeneiner	Ruth Leuwerik, Hannes Messemer, Viktor Staal	Drama	
The Taming of the Shrew	Ludwig Berger	Günter Pfitzmann, Ursula Lingen, Rudolf Platte, Joachim Hansen	Comedy	
That Won't Keep a Sailor Down	Arthur Maria Rabenalt	Karlheinz Böhm, Antje Geerk, Georg Thomalla	Comedy drama	Co-production with Denmark
Thirteen Old Donkeys	Hans Deppe	Hans Albers, Marianne Hoppe, Karin Dor	Comedy	
The Trapp Family in America	Wolfgang Liebeneiner	Ruth Leuwerik, Hans Holt, Josef Meinrad	Comedy drama	
Twelfth Night	Ludwig Berger	Joachim Hansen, Ursula Lillig, Theo Lingen	Comedy	
U 47 – Kapitänleutnant Prien	Harald Reinl	Dieter Eppler, Joachim Fuchsberger, Dieter Borsche	War drama	
Voyage to Italy, Complete with Love	Wolfgang Becker	Paul Hubschmid, Susanne Cramer, Hannelore Schroth	Comedy	
When She Starts, Look Out	Géza von Cziffra	Peter Alexander, Bibi Johns, Ruth Stephan	Comedy	
The Winner	John Olden	Sonja Ziemann, Dieter Borsche, Heinz Drache	Drama	a.k.a. Die Beklagte
A Woman Who Knows What She Wants	Arthur Maria Rabenalt	Lilli Palmer, Maria Sebaldt, Rudolf Vogel	Musical	

== Bibliography ==
- Davidson, John & Hake, Sabine. Framing the Fifties: Cinema in a Divided Germany. Berghahn Books, 2007.
- Fehrenbach, Heide. Cinema in Democratizing Germany: Reconstructing National Identity After Hitler. University of North Carolina Press, 1995.

== See also ==
- List of Austrian films of 1958
- List of East German films of 1958
