= Frankenfeld (surname) =

Frankenfeld is a surname. Notable people with the surname include:

- Don Frankenfeld, American politician
- Peter Frankenfeld, German comedian, radio personality, and TV personality
