= The Singing Hotel =

1953 film

- Directed by: Géza von Cziffra
- Written by: Géza von Cziffra
- Produced by: Franz Tappers
- Starring: Hans Söhnker; Rudolf Platte; Joseph Egger; Fita Benkhoff
- Cinematography: Willy Winterstein
- Edited by: Alice Ludwig
- Music by: Michael Jary
- Production company: Standard-Filmverleih
- Distributed by: Deutsche London-Film
- Release date: 30 July 1953
- Running time: 91 minutes
- Country: West Germany
- Language: German

The Singing Hotel (German: Das singende Hotel) is a 1953 West German musical comedy film directed by Géza von Cziffra and starring Hans Söhnker, Rudolf Platte and Fita Benkhoff. It was shot at the Wandsbek Studios of Real Film in Hamburg and on location in Oberstdorf and Kitzbühel. The film's sets were designed by the art directors Albrecht Becker and Herbert Kirchhoff.

== Cast ==
- Hans Söhnker as Hans
- Ursula Justin as Gisela
- Fita Benkhoff as Dr. Toni Bruscher
- Rudolf Platte as Theodor Giesemann
- Paul Westermeier as Rodler, Geschäftsführer
- Rita Paul as Anita Mohr
- Bully Buhlan as Tommy Olsen
- Helmut Zacharias as Karli Alten, Violin
- Friedel Hensch as Singer
- Rosiana Larau as Dixi, Tänzerin
- Joseph Egger as Wurmser, Hotelportier
- Edith Schollwer as Frau Giesemann
- Marina Ried as Dagmar
- Josef Dahmen
- Hans Stiebner
- Wastl Witt as Anton, Kellner
- Dorle Rath as Singer
- Günther Jerschke
- Hermann Lenschau
- Joseph Offenbach

== Bibliography ==
- Hans-Michael Bock and Tim Bergfelder. The Concise Cinegraph: An Encyclopedia of German Cinema. Berghahn Books, 2009.
