= Helga Martin =

German movie actress

Helga Martin (real name Helga Dümler; 1940–1999) was a German film actress.

== Life ==
At the age of 16, she played in German movies for the first time. She impersonated "Frieda" in the movie My Aunt, Your Aunt. She became known at the side of Hans Albers in It Happened Only Once from the year 1958 and in the Schlagerfilm When She Starts, Look Out beside Peter Alexander and Bibi Johns. One of her last appearances was in 1959 with Heinz Erhardt and Grethe Weiser in the comedy Der Haus-Tyrann and in Wolfgang Becker's Der lustige Krieg des Hauptmann Pedro. Will Tremper reported about her in the Stern series Deutschland deine Sternchen, whereupon the film producer Rudolf Kalmowicz prematurely terminated a film contract with her.

== Selected filmography ==
- The Beautiful Master (1956)
- My Aunt, Your Aunt (1956)
- Banktresor 713 (1957)
- The Schimeck Family (1957)
- Love, Girls and Soldiers (1958)
- It Happened Only Once (1958)
- When She Starts, Look Out(1958)
- Immer die Mädchen (1959)
- A Summer You Will Never Forget (1959)
- The Domestic Tyrant (1959)
- The Merry War of Captain Pedro (1959)
