= Dancing in the Sun =

1954 film

- Directed by: Géza von Cziffra
- Written by: Géza von Cziffra
- Produced by: Otto Meissner
- Starring: Cécile Aubry; Franco Andrei; Ursula Justin
- Cinematography: Willy Winterstein
- Edited by: Alice Ludwig
- Music by: Lotar Olias
- Production company: Arion-Film
- Distributed by: Deutsche London Film
- Release date: 6 October 1954
- Running time: 94 minutes
- Country: West Germany
- Language: German

Dancing in the Sun (German: Tanz in der Sonne) is a 1954 West German musical film directed by Géza von Cziffra and starring Cécile Aubry, Franco Andrei and Ursula Justin. It was shot on location in Hamburg and Andalucía.

The film's art direction was by Albrecht Becker and Herbert Kirchhoff. It was shot at the Wandsbek Studios in Hamburg and on location in Spain.

== Cast ==
- Cécile Aubry as Solotänzerin Nanon
- Franco Andrei as Sänger Antonio Avila
- Ursula Justin as Tänzerin Biggi
- Rudolf Platte as Galdos
- Oskar Sima as Don Armando
- Hans Olden as Felipe
- Joseph Offenbach as Theaterdirektor Mendoza
- Helmuth Beck as Orenze
- Max Walter Sieg as Larra
- Ingrid Mirbach as Molly
- Christiane König as Grete
- Peter Frank as Don Ramon
- Angelica Mirete
- Dorle Rath
- Willy Witte
- Hans Greve
- Dr. Kahlen
- Kurt Fuß
- Horst von Otto
- Josef Albrecht
- Karl Meiberg
- Mona Baptiste as Sängerin
- Undine von Medvey as Sängerin
- Teddy Reno as Sänger
- Sunshine Quartett as Gesangsgruppe
- Macky Kaspar as Solotrompeter
- Gert Reinholm as Tänzer
- Erwin Bredow as Tänzer
- Otto Boddin as Tänzer
- Angèle Durand as Sängerin
- Lotar Olias as Music

== Bibliography ==
- Gert Koshofer. Color: die Farben des Films. Spiess, 1988.
