= Frankenfeld =

Frankenfeld may refer to:

- Frankenfeld (Baudenbach), a locality in Baudenbach municipality, Bavaria, Germany
- Frankenfeld, Lower Saxony, a municipality in Lower Saxony, Germany
- Frankenfeld (surname)
