= Money from the Air =

1954 film

- Directed by: Géza von Cziffra
- Written by: Géza von Cziffra
- Produced by: Géza von Cziffra
- Starring: Josef Meinrad; Lonny Kellner; Grethe Weiser
- Cinematography: Willy Winterstein
- Edited by: Alice Ludwig
- Music by: Heino Gaze; Lotar Olias
- Production company: Arion-Film
- Distributed by: Deutsche London-Film
- Release date: 27 July 1954
- Running time: 94 minutes
- Country: West Germany
- Language: German

Money from the Air (German: Geld aus der Luft) is a 1954 West German musical comedy film directed by Géza von Cziffra and starring Josef Meinrad, Lonny Kellner, and Grethe Weiser. It was shot at the Wandsbek Studios of Real Film in Hamburg. The film's sets were designed by the art directors Albrecht Becker and Herbert Kirchhoff.

== Cast ==
- Josef Meinrad as Stefan Gregor
- Lonny Kellner as Helga Gregpr
- Grethe Weiser as Frau Perle, Helgas Mutter
- Ursula Justin as Marion Ahrens
- Rudolf Platte as Wilhelm Michels
- Paul Westermeier as Heinrich Michels
- Hans Olden as Alfred Huber
- Bruce Low as himself, Singer
- Joseph Offenbach as Richter beim Scheidungsgericht
- Hans Schwarz Jr. as Dr. Hans Frank, Lawyer
- Max Walter Sieg as Josef, Diener
- Kurt A. Jung as Gerichtsdiener
- Ilja Glusgal as Kapellmeister
- Brigitte Rau
- Macky Kaspar
- Rolf Kühn
- Friedel Hensch und die Cyprys as Themselves
- Jockel Stahl as Tänzer
- Liselotte Köster as Tänzerin
- Rosiana Larau as Tänzerin
- Erwin Bredow as Tänzer

== Bibliography ==
- Schiweck, Ingo (2005). "Lass dich überraschen—": niederländische Unterhaltungskünstler in Deutschland nach 1945. Münster: Agenda. ISBN 978-3-89688-255-4.
