= Karl Hellmer =

Austrian actor (1896-1974)

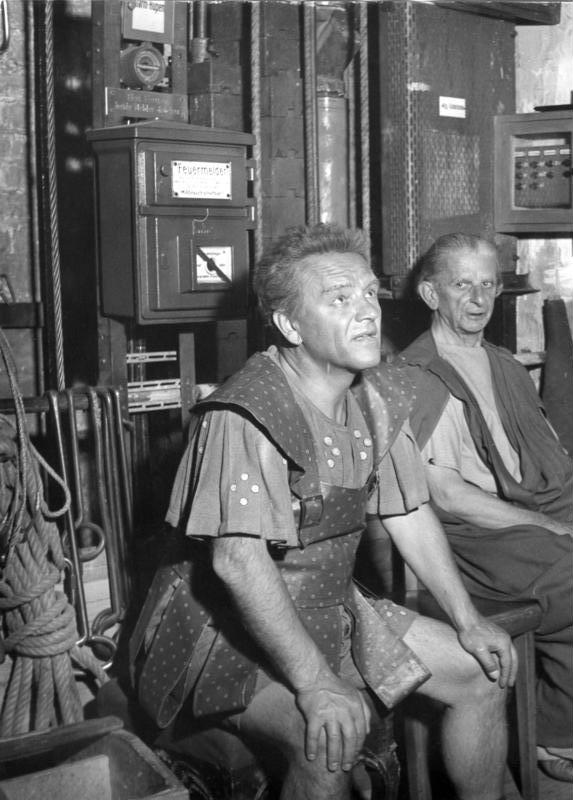
- Karl Hellmer, 1953
- Born: 11 March 1896; Vienna, Austria-Hungary
- Died: 18 May 1974 (aged 78); West Berlin, West Germany
- Occupation: Actor
- Years active: 1932–1969

Karl Hellmer (11 March 1896 – 18 May 1974) was an Austrian film actor. He appeared in 92 films between 1932 and 1969. He was born in Vienna, Austria and died in Berlin, Germany.

== Selected filmography ==
- I by Day, You by Night (1932)
- The Young Baron Neuhaus (1934)
- Love, Death and the Devil (1934)
- Ungeküsst soll man nicht schlafen gehn (1936)
- City of Anatol (1936)
- Stronger Than Regulations (1936)
- The Haunted Castle (1936)
- Such Great Foolishness (1937)
- Madame Bovary (1937)
- Togger (1937)
- The Mystery of Betty Bonn (1938)
- Little County Court (1938)
- The Life and Loves of Tschaikovsky (1939)
- Falstaff in Vienna (1940)
- Friedemann Bach (1941)
- The Way to Freedom (1941)
- The Swedish Nightingale (1941)
- A Salzburg Comedy (1943)
- Laugh Bajazzo (1943)
- Carnival of Love (1943)
- Heaven, We Inherit a Castle (1943)
- Nora (1944)
- That Was My Life (1944)
- Via Mala (1945)
- Wozzeck (1947)
- The Morgenrot Mine (1948)
- Quartet of Five (1949)
- The Great Mandarin (1949)
- Heart of Stone (1950)
- Dark Eyes (1951)
- Such a Charade (1953)
- Elephant Fury (1953)
- Christina (1953)
- The Witch (1954)
- Die Ratten (1955)
- My Brother Joshua (1956)
- Winter in the Woods (1956)
- The Night of the Storm (1957)
- It Happened Only Once (1958)
- The Copper (1958)
- The Castle (1968)
