= Three Men in a Boat (1961 film) =

- Directed by: Helmut Weiss
- Written by: Wolf Neumeister
- Based on: Three Men in a Boat by Jerome K. Jerome
- Produced by: Heinz Willeg; Alfred Stöger; Kurt Ulrich
- Starring: Walter Giller; Heinz Erhardt; Hans-Joachim Kulenkampff; Susanne Cramer
- Cinematography: Sepp Ketterer
- Edited by: Wolfgang Wehrum
- Music by: Werner Müller
- Production companies: Kurt Ulrich Filmproduktion; Wiener Mundus-Film
- Distributed by: Gloria Film
- Release date: 25 August 1961
- Running time: 90 minutes
- Countries: Austria; West Germany
- Language: German

Three Men in a Boat (German: Drei Mann in einem Boot) is a 1961 Austrian-West German comedy film directed by Helmut Weiss and starring Walter Giller, Heinz Erhardt, Hans-Joachim Kulenkampff and Susanne Cramer. The film is based on the 1889 British novel Three Men in a Boat by Jerome K. Jerome. It was shot at the Rosenhügel Studios in Vienna and on location in Amsterdam and along the River Rhine through the Rhineland region and Baden-Württemberg of Germany and Switzerland. The film's sets were designed by the veteran art director Willi Herrmann.

== Plot ==
The advertisement salesmen Harry Berg and Jerome, named "Jo", Sommer are on holiday at the Bodensee alone. Jo is trying to woo the young girl Grit and Harry wants to get rid of his intrusive girlfriend Julischka. When she suddenly appears, Harry and Jo try to buy a boat to get away. They also find a dog and call him "Sputnik".

The art salesman Georg Nolte, too, yearns for a vacation but his wife Carlotta and his daughter Grit won't allow it. In a bar he overhears Harry and Jo talking about the boat and asks to join them; he offers himself as a cook. They agree and the three of them call their trip "Three Men on a boat, not to forget about the dog", in reference to a well-known book. They also call the boat "Marianne".

When the wives discover their husbands are missing, they try to follow them. Julischka even hires a Swiss detective. Meanwhile the trio decide to travel down the River Rhine, so Georg can attend an auction in Amsterdam to buy a painting by Renoir and sell one by Brueghel. On the boat Georg and Harry are named Captains (Georg claimed that he served on a battleship, however he later admitted that he was only a visitor) and Jo the first mate. But things change after they have an accident at the Rheinfall when Georg is unaware that they are heading towards a waterfall, so he becomes the first mate instead of Jo. Later they have another accident with another ship, where one of the crew, the mate Betje falls overboard and is saved by the three men from the "Marianne".

During their journey they also stop in Königswinter, where Georg finds his daughter and realizes that Jo was after her, but he gives them his blessing. He hasn't seen his wife and tells her over the phone to wait in Amsterdam. Meanwhile, romance blossoms between Harry and Betje.

In Amsterdam Harry and Jo go to the auction but Georg is late, because he moors the boat in the wrong place. When he comes to the auction, he's told that the Renoir has been sold at a very low price to some young guy. Apparently, Jo accidentally bought the painting, because he didn't know about the hand-raise-rule at auctions. Harry told Georg about it in the way, that Jo did a great bluff. Georg is impressed with Jo and at the end everybody is happy.

At the end Julischka doesn't want Harry anymore and starts dating the detective. Meanwhile, Harry and Georg are on the boat with Betje and Carlotta, while the boat is tied by a rope to a car with Jo and Grit inside. At the end Jo says, "Would be good to get rid of them", not noticing that the rope got ripped. The movie ends with that scene.

=== Differences from novel ===
The location is changed from the Thames to the Rhine River, the story differs substantially and is set to happen in 1960. The main connection to the novel is the basic idea of three friends travelling downriver in a boat and the names are of the characters are similar. The novel itself is also mentioned in a dialog.

== Cast ==
- Walter Giller as Jerome (Jo) Sommer
- Heinz Erhardt as Georg Nolte
- Hans-Joachim Kulenkampff as Harry Berg
- Susanne Cramer as Betje Ackerboom
- Ina Duscha as Grit Nolte
- Loni Heuser as Carlotta, Grit's Mother
- Josef Sieber as Captain Ackerboom
- Ida Boros as Julischka (Fee) von Wendorf
- Bum Krüger as Melman
- Willy Reichert as Mägele
- Sepp Rist as Guggemos
- Rolf Wanka as Dr. Flüeli
- Tobby as Sputnik

== Soundtrack ==
Like many German movies of that time, this movie features a few original songs, like:

- Drei Mann in einem Boot - sung by Heinz Erhardt, Hans-Joachim Kulenkampff and Walter Giller
- Oh Marianne - sung by Heinz Erhardt, Hans-Joachim Kulenkampff and Walter Giller
