= I'll See You at Lake Constance =

1956 film

- Directed by: Hans Albin
- Written by: Gerhard Metzner
- Produced by: Willi R. Constantin
- Starring: Gretl Schörg; Lonny Kellner; Erwin Strahl
- Cinematography: Georg Krause
- Edited by: Gertrud Petermann
- Music by: Harald Böhmelt
- Production company: Consul Film
- Distributed by: J. Arthur Rank Film
- Release date: 26 October 1956
- Running time: 94 minutes
- Country: West Germany
- Language: German

I'll See You at Lake Constance (German: Auf Wiedersehn am Bodensee) is a 1956 West German comedy film directed by Hans Albin and starring Gretl Schörg, Lonny Kellner and Erwin Strahl. The film was shot in Agfacolor. It is set in a tourist hotel on the edge of Lake Constance, where its female owner's experiences have taught her not to trust men.

== Cast ==
- Gretl Schörg as Marianne
- Lonny Kellner as Monika
- Erwin Strahl as Klaus
- Joachim Brennecke as Dr. Werner Bergmann
- Carola Höhn as Frl. Schramm, Sekretärin
- Beppo Brem as Schöberl, Portier
- Erna Sellmer as Erna, seine Frau
- Bum Krüger as Hotelarzt
- Ursula Barlen as Mrs. Mills
- Peter Garden as Ein schöner Mann
- Margot Rupp as Schwester Helene
- Käthe Haack as Frau Engelmann
- Willem Holsboer as Lehrer Martin
- Angelika Bender as Vera
- Ernst Freundorfer as Nicki

== Bibliography ==
- Parish, Robert. Film Actors Guide. Scarecrow Press, 1977.
