= My Husband, the Economic Miracle =

1961 film

- Directed by: Ulrich Erfurth
- Written by: Dieter Hildebrandt; Thomas Westa; Joachim Wichmann
- Produced by: Georg Richter
- Starring: Marika Rökk; Fritz Tillmann; Cornelia Froboess; Heinz Erhardt
- Cinematography: Albert Benitz
- Edited by: Heinz Haber
- Music by: Michael Jary
- Production company: Deutsche Film Hansa
- Distributed by: Deutsche Film Hansa
- Release date: 26 January 1961
- Running time: 82 minutes
- Country: West Germany
- Language: German

My Husband, the Economic Miracle (German: Mein Mann, das Wirtschaftswunder) is a 1961 West German comedy film directed by Ulrich Erfurth and starring Marika Rökk, Fritz Tillmann and Cornelia Froboess. The film portrays the economic miracle of the post-war years and its effects on German society.

The film's sets were designed by the art director Ernst H. Albrecht. Location filming took place in West Berlin including at Tempelhof Airport.

== Cast ==
- Marika Rökk as Ilona Farkas
- Fritz Tillmann as Alexander Engelmann
- Cornelia Froboess as Julia, seine Tochter
- Heinz Erhardt as Paul Korn - sein Freund u. Fahrer
- Adelheid Seeck as Helene Grolmann - Ilonas Managerin
- Helmuth Lohner as Tommy Schiller - ein Journalist
- Friedrich Schoenfelder as Dr. Bach - Syndikus
- Wolfgang Völz as Sekretär
- Marielouise Nagel as Sekretärin
- Georg Bastian as Freddy - ein Mitschüler Julias
- Heinrich Gies as Arzt

== Bibliography ==
- Wiesen, Jonathan. West German Industry and the Challenge of the Nazi Past: 1945–1955. University of North Carolina Press, 2004.
