= A Holiday Like Never Before =

1963 film

- Directed by: Wolfgang Schleif
- Written by: Heinz Oskar Wuttig
- Based on: Percy auf Abwegen by Hans Thomas
- Produced by: Gero Wecker
- Starring: Eva Bartok; Carlos Thompson; Corny Collins
- Cinematography: Werner M. Lenz
- Edited by: Wolfgang Wehrum
- Music by: Heino Gaze; Hans-Jürgen Naumann
- Production companies: Arca-Filmproduktion; Avala Film; Kurt Ulrich Filmproduktion
- Distributed by: Nora-Filmverleih
- Release date: 8 March 1963
- Running time: 94 minutes
- Country: West Germany
- Language: German

A Holiday Like Never Before (German: Ferien wie noch nie) is a 1963 West German comedy thriller film directed by Wolfgang Schleif and starring Eva Bartok, Carlos Thompson and Corny Collins. It was shot in Agfacolor at the Arca Studios in Pichelsberg in West Berlin. in The film's sets were designed by the art director Ernst H. Albrecht. It is based on the 1938 novel Percy auf Abwegen by Hans Thomas, which had previously been adapted into the 1940 film A Man Astray during the Nazi era.

== Synopsis ==
Berlin bank executive John Valera apparently grows tired of his everyday life, and departs for a sudden holiday in Italy under an assumed name. He enjoys a series of adventures, paying his way by taking on a number of itinerant jobs. Meanwhile, back in Germany he is accused of having embezzled millions of deutschmarks from the bank. He meets the alluring Kristina Bajonova, while he is joined by his sister Gaby in Italy.

== Cast ==
- Eva Bartok as Kristina Bajonova
- Carlos Thompson as John Valera
- Corny Collins as Gaby Valera
- Peter Vogel as Mike Roberts
- Marlene Warrlich as Marcella
- Thomas Danneberg
- Ralf Wolter
- Albert Bessler
- Herbert Weißbach

== Bibliography ==
- Goble, Alan. The Complete Index to Literary Sources in Film. Walter de Gruyter, 1999.
- Klaus, Ulrich J. Deutsche Tonfilme: Jahrgang 1940. Klaus-Archiv, 1988.
