= Widower with Five Daughters =

1957 film

- German film poster
- German: Witwer mit 5 Töchtern
- Directed by: Erich Engels
- Written by: Rolf Becker; Alexandra Becker; Erich Engels
- Starring: Heinz Erhardt; Susanne Cramer; Helmuth Lohner
- Cinematography: Willy Winterstein
- Edited by: Martha Dübber
- Music by: Heino Gaze
- Production company: Deutsche Film Hansa
- Distributed by: Deutsche Film Hansa
- Release date: 6 September 1957
- Running time: 96 minutes
- Country: West Germany
- Language: German

Widower with Five Daughters (German: Witwer mit 5 Töchtern) is a 1957 West German comedy film directed by Erich Engels and starring Heinz Erhardt, Susanne Cramer, and Helmuth Lohner. It was shot at Göttingen Studios, with location shooting at Berlepsch Castle near Witzenhausen. The art directors Dieter Bartels and Paul Markwitz designed the film's sets.

== Plot ==
A father has brought up his five daughters alone since the death of his wife, while also working as the custodian of a castle which is now owned by an American. He sometimes receives the help of a local woman, evoking mixed reactions on the part of his daughters as they consider her as a prospective new mother.

== Cast ==
- Heinz Erhardt as Friedrich Scherzer
- Susanne Cramer as Karin Scherzer
- Helmuth Lohner as Dr. Klaus Hellmann
- Lotte Rausch as Frau Hansen
- Angelika Meissner as Marie Scherzer
- Vera Tschechowa as Anne Scherzer
- Elke Aberle as Julchen Scherzer
- Christine Kaufmann as Ulla Scherzer
- Michael Lang as Altfeld
- Peter Vogel as Fred
- Alexander von Richthofen as Jäcky
- Marina Ried as Frau Kostowitsch
- Carsta Löck as Frl. Nessel
- Lotte Brackebusch as Meta Sengstake
- Maly Delschaft as Berta Sengstake
- Nora Minor as Frl. Forsch
- Chris Howland as Mr. Printice
- Heinz Schorlemmer as Amtmann Stoelz
- Frank Forster as singer
- Iván Petrovich as Mr. Pfefferkorn
