= My Brother Joshua =

1956 film directed by Hans Deppe

- Directed by: Hans Deppe
- Written by: Werner Eplinius; Janne Furch
- Produced by: Johannes J. Frank; Wilhelm Gernhardt
- Starring: Willy A. Kleinau; Ingrid Andree; Kenneth Spencer
- Cinematography: Werner M. Lenz
- Edited by: Hanna Meisel
- Music by: Willy Mattes
- Production company: Hans Deppe Film
- Distributed by: Europa-Filmverleih
- Release date: 19 September 1956
- Running time: 92 minutes
- Country: West Germany
- Language: German

My Brother Joshua (German: Mein Bruder Josua) is a 1956 West German drama film directed by Hans Deppe and starring Willy A. Kleinau, Ingrid Andree and Kenneth Spencer. It is a heimatfilm.

It was made at the Wandsbek Studios in Hamburg. The film's sets were designed by the art director Willi Herrmann and Heinrich Weidemann. It was shot in Eastmancolor.

== Cast ==
- Willy A. Kleinau as Mathias Bruckner
- Ingrid Andree as Lena, Bruckners Tochter
- Kenneth Spencer as Josua Washington Stone
- Gunnar Möller as Christoph Wiesner
- Jan Hendriks as Hans Donath, beider Sohn
- Berta Drews as Franziska Donath
- Karl Hellmer as Joseph Donath, Franziskas Mann
- Hans Nielsen as Der Pfarrer
- Gudrun Schmidt as Hildegard, die Kellnerin
- Franz Schafheitlin as Der Bürgermeister
- Gottfried Geissler as Vinzent Heindl, Wirt
- Manfred Meurer as Der amerikanische Captain
- Otto Schwartz as Der Großknecht

== Bibliography ==
- Gerhard Bliersbach. So grün war die Heide: der deutsche Nachkriegsfilm in neuer Sicht. Beltz, 1985.
