= Dieter Bartels =

German art director (1920–2010)

- Born: 28 March 1920; Hamburg, Germany
- Died: 3 September 2010 (aged 90); Hungary
- Occupation: Art director
- Years active: 1952-1979 (film)

Dieter Bartels (28 March 1920 – 3 September 2010) was a German art director. He is sometimes credited as F. Dieter Bartels.

== Selected filmography ==
- Victoria and Her Hussar (1954)
- Island of the Dead (1955)
- Lost Child 312 (1955)
- How Do I Become a Film Star? (1955)
- Secrets of the City (1955)
- The Marriage of Doctor Danwitz (1956)
- Three Birch Trees on the Heath (1956)
- Widower with Five Daughters (1957)
- The Big Chance (1957)
- Tired Theodore (1957)
- The Legs of Dolores (1957)
- Night Nurse Ingeborg (1958)
- Doctor Crippen Lives (1958)
- Yes, Women are Dangerous (1960)
- Question 7 (1961)
- Escape from East Berlin (1962)
- Stop Train 349 (1963)
- Angels of the Street (1969)
- No Gold for a Dead Diver (1974)
- Bloodline (1979)

== Bibliography ==
- Sweeney, Kevin. James Mason: A Bio-bibliography. Greenwood Publishing Group, 1999.
