= How Do I Become a Film Star? =

- Directed by: Theo Lingen
- Written by: Curth Flatow
- Produced by: Michael Jary; Herbert Obscherningkat
- Starring: Nadja Tiller; Harald Juhnke; Bibi Johns
- Cinematography: Ekkehard Kyrath
- Edited by: Ingrid Wacker
- Music by: Michael Jary
- Production company: Burg-Film
- Distributed by: Europa-Filmverleih
- Release date: 28 July 1955
- Running time: 92 minutes
- Country: West Germany
- Language: German

How Do I Become a Film Star? (German: Wie werde ich Filmstar?) is a 1955 West German musical comedy film directed by Theo Lingen and starring Nadja Tiller, Harald Juhnke and Bibi Johns.

It was shot at the Wandsbek Studios in Hamburg. The film's sets were designed by the art director Dieter Bartels and Herbert Kirchhoff.

== Cast ==
- Nadja Tiller as Marianne Krause
- Harald Juhnke as Günther Scholz
- Bibi Johns as Brigitte Lenz
- Peter Garden as Fritz Neumann
- Ruth Stephan as Elli May
- Oskar Sima as Willi Glaser
- Theo Lingen as Paul Kubisch
- Mona Baptiste as Mona Grandez
- Carl Voscherauas Vater Lenz
- Carl-Heinz Schroth as Regisseur Altmann
- Bully Buhlan as Kurt Hampel
- Agnes Windeck as Frau von Klagemann
- Ilja Glusgal as Geschäftsführer
- Peter Hinnen as Waldi

== Bibliography ==
- Bock, Hans-Michael & Bergfelder, Tim. The Concise CineGraph. Encyclopedia of German Cinema. Berghahn Books, 2009.
