= Lonny Kellner =

German singer and actress (1930–2003)

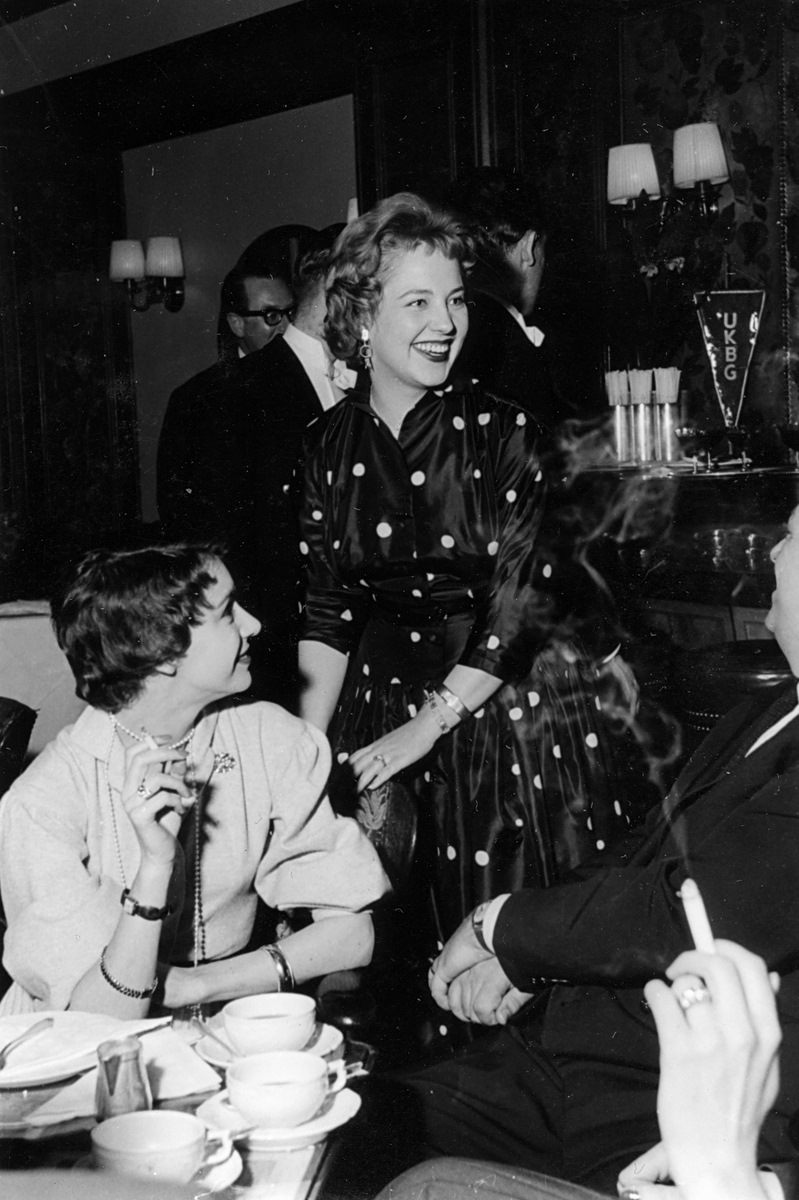
- Kellner (standing) in 1955
- Born: 8 March 1930; Remscheid, Rhine Province, Prussia, Germany
- Died: 22 January 2003 (aged 72); Hamburg, Germany
- Occupation(s): Actress, singer

Lonny Kellner (8 March 1930 – 22 January 2003) was a German singer and actress. She was married to Peter Frankenfeld.

== Selected filmography ==
- Queen of the Arena (1952)
- Dancing Stars (1952)
- The Flower of Hawaii (1953)
- Money from the Air (1954)
- Don't Worry About Your Mother-in-Law (1954)
- The Perfect Couple (1954)
- Music, Music and Only Music (1955)
- I'll See You at Lake Constance (1956)
- Love, Summer and Music (1956)
- Tired Theodore (1957)

== Bibliography ==
Gerd Holler. Josef Meinrad: "Da streiten sich de Leut herum ...". Amalthea, 1995.
