= Wild Water (film) =

- Directed by: Rudolf Schündler
- Written by: Hans Billian; Wolf Neumeister; Maria von der Osten-Sacken
- Starring: Marianne Hold; Hans von Borsody; Corny Collins
- Cinematography: Siegfried Hold
- Edited by: Renate Jelinek
- Music by: Heinz Neubrand
- Production companies: Astra Filmkunst; Miksch Filmproduktion
- Distributed by: Schorcht Filmverleih
- Release date: 26 October 1962
- Running time: 98 minutes
- Countries: Austria; West Germany
- Language: German

Wild Water (German: Wilde Wasser) is a 1962 Austrian-West German drama film directed by Rudolf Schündler and starring Marianne Hold, Hans von Borsody and Corny Collins. It was part of the post-war boom in heimatfilm.

The film's sets were designed by the art director Hans Zehetner.

== Plot ==
Thomas Mautner, who is very talented musically and popular with the ladies, prefers to spend his time playing the organ in the village church rather than working in his father's sawmill. When Thomas rescues the pretty Andrea from the life-threatening torrent, he senses his chance to leave his father's business for good. In the posh spa town of Bad Gastein, he hopes to gain the support of Andrea's father, who, however, is only interested in his property. Thomas can only impress Andrea's friends by imitating their extravagant lifestyle. But to do so, he constantly needs money, which he obtains by signing promissory notes from Andrea's father. One day, the moment of truth arrives, and Thomas experiences a bitter disappointment.

== Cast ==
- Marianne Hold as Magdalena Ullmann
- Hans von Borsody as Thomas Mautner
- Corny Collins as Andrea Sternberg
- Ruth Stephan as Johanna
- Ingeborg Gruber as Monika Böhmel
- Friedrich Schoenfelder as Baron Ferdinand von Lindner
- Sieghardt Rupp as Markus Mautner
- Beppo Brem as Fabian
- Franz Muxeneder as Siegfried 'Sigi' Reiber
- Rolf Olsen as Sternberg
- Viktor Staal as Förster Böhmel
- Heinrich Gretler as Mautner sr.
- Silvia Simon
- Susanne von Ratony
- Harry Engel
- Sergio Casmai

== Bibliography ==
- Bock, Hans-Michael & Bergfelder, Tim. The Concise CineGraph. Encyclopedia of German Cinema. Berghahn Books, 2009.
