= Until Money Departs You =

1960 film

- Directed by: Alfred Vohrer
- Written by: Angela Ritter (novel); Heinz Oskar Wuttig
- Produced by: Artur Brauner
- Starring: Luise Ullrich; Gert Fröbe; Corny Collins
- Cinematography: Kurt Hasse; Karl Löb
- Edited by: Ira Oberberg
- Music by: Herbert Trantow
- Production company: Alfa Film
- Distributed by: Constantin Film
- Release date: 27 September 1960
- Running time: 96 minutes
- Country: West Germany
- Language: German

Until Money Departs You (German: Bis daß das Geld euch scheidet) is a 1960 West German drama film directed by Alfred Vohrer and starring Luise Ullrich, Gert Fröbe and Corny Collins.

It was shot at the Spandau Studios in Berlin and on location in Salzburg and Bavaria's Walchensee. The film's sets were designed by the art directors Erich Kettelhut and Johannes Ott.

== Cast ==
- Luise Ullrich as Lisbeth Grapsch
- Gert Fröbe as Jupp Grapsch
- Corny Collins as Heidi Grapsch
- Wolfgang Lukschy as Robert Grothe
- Christiane Nielsen as Nina Sonntag
- Leon Askin as Dr. Plauert
- Hans Hessling as Dr. Giller
- Herbert Tiede as Fritz Hassen
- Peter Parak as Poldi
- Friedrich Schoenfelder as Richter
- Hugo Schrader as Krause
- Monika John as Else Langhans
- Marielouise Nagel
- Edith Schollwer
- Tilo von Berlepsch as Dr. Stumpf
