= Tired Theodore (1957 film) =

1957 film

- Directed by: Géza von Cziffra
- Written by: Max Neal (play); Max Ferner (play); Franz Gribitz (screenplay); Gustav Kampendonk (screenplay)
- Starring: Heinz Erhardt; Renate Ewert; Peter Weck
- Cinematography: Willy Winterstein
- Edited by: Martha Dübber
- Music by: Heino Gaze
- Production company: Deutsche Film Hansa
- Distributed by: Deutsche Film Hansa
- Release date: 6 June 1957
- Running time: 95 minutes
- Country: West Germany
- Language: German

Tired Theodore (German: Der müde Theodor) is a 1957 West German comedy film directed by Géza von Cziffra and starring Heinz Erhardt, Renate Ewert and Peter Weck. It was shot at the Göttingen Studios. The film's sets were designed by the art directors Dieter Bartels and Paul Markwitz.

== Plot ==
Theodore Hagemann is under the thumb of his domineering wife, Rosa Hagemann, owner of a jam factory. His efforts to support young artists as a patron have long been a thorn in her side. Her search for advice from a psychiatrist fails, however, when he also turns out to be an art lover. The mother's aversion to art is also the reason her daughter Jenny keeps her engagement to the composer Harald Steinberg a secret. Harald is eagerly awaiting the premiere of his latest work, which is crucial for his career.

When Theodore loses a lawsuit for having stood surety for an unsuccessful poet, his wife has him declared legally incompetent shortly before she has to leave for a trip. However, Theodore desperately needs money, as he has paid off the debts of the young singer Lilo Haase, whose belongings, including her piano, would otherwise have been seized. He obtained the money from the pawnbroker, to whom he had deposited a gold watch and a gold cigarette case. When his former school friend's advice to bet on the horse races proves unsuccessful, the friend gets Theodore a job as a waiter at the Schwarzer Adler Hotel (Black Eagle). When Lilo Haase, who is engaged to Felix, finds Theodore working as a waiter at the hotel, she is saddened that Theodore apparently now has debts and is forced to work as a waiter because of her.

At the Hagemann household, his long daytime sleep is causing suspicion. Rosa Hagemann travels home with her daughter a few days earlier than planned and meets Walter Steinberg, the biscuit manufacturer and father of Jenny's fiancé, on the train. He has asked his father to put in a good word for him with his future mother-in-law. Steinberg Senior and Mrs. Hagemann agree that the marriage of two manufacturing families would be advantageous; to dissuade Harald from his artistic ambitions, Walter Steinberg plans to sabotage the concert by buying up all the tickets.

Theodore finds himself in a bind when his waiter's tailcoat ends up at the dry cleaners. There, he exchanges the tailcoat, which Dr. Karl Findeisen, a guest at the "Black Eagle," needs for a reception with the Prime Minister, for his everyday jacket. However, the pawnbroker's promissory note is still inside the jacket. At the "Black Eagle," Dr. Findeisen asks the room service waiter Theodore for help so he doesn't have to appear before the Minister of Education without a tailcoat. Findeisen claims the person responsible for the mix-up can soon be identified, since he forgot his promissory note in his jacket. Theodore helps Dr. Findeisen fake an accident, bandaging and anesthetizing him to retrieve the promissory note from his jacket.

Meanwhile, Harald's concert is a disappointment, as no audience shows up. Jenny is distraught, and Harald hides away in the hotel. There, Jenny finds him in a compromising situation with Lilo, while Rosa discovers Theodore's work as a waiter. After the misunderstanding with Jenny is cleared up, Theodore, Harald, Jenny, Felix, and Lilo join forces to put an end to Rosa's domineering ways. They explain to her that she mistook the waiter for Theodore. Later, she realizes she's been deceived but is relieved that her husband is no longer involved in the arts but is instead running the company.

== Cast ==
- Heinz Erhardt as Theodor Hagemann
- Renate Ewert as Lilo Haase
- Peter Weck as Felix
- Loni Heuser as Rosa Hagemann
- Karin Baal as Jenny Hagemann - Tochter
- Albert Rueprecht as Harald Steinbberg
- Werner Finck as Dr. Karl Findeisen
- Kurt Großkurth as Walter Steinberg - Fabrikant
- Wolfgang Neuss as Direktor Noll
- Hubert von Meyerinck as Wilhelm Schulze
- Wolfgang Müller as Anton - Chefkoch
- Franz-Otto Krüger as Professor Erwin Link
- Joseph Offenbach as Rafael Cacozzo
- Ralf Wolter as Storch - Gerichtsvollzieher
- Wolfgang Heyer as Fritz Kümmel, Piccolo
- Reinhard Kolldehoff as Hotelgast
- Herbert Weissbach as Pfandleiher
- Balduin Baas as Anton - Hoteldiener
- Horst Beck as Regierungsrat Stammfest
- Lonny Kellner as Sängerin

== Bibliography ==
- Bock, Hans-Michael & Bergfelder, Tim. The Concise CineGraph. Encyclopedia of German Cinema. Berghahn Books, 2009.
