= Bum Krüger =

German actor

- Born: 13 March 1906; Berlin, German Empire
- Died: 15 March 1971 (aged 65); West Berlin, West Germany
- Occupation: Actor
- Years active: 1948-1969

Bum Krüger (born Willy Krüger; 13 March 1906 - 15 March 1971) was a German actor. He appeared in more than one hundred films from 1948 to 1969.

== Filmography ==
Year	Title	Role	Notes
1948	Film Without a Title	Dancke	
1948	Der Herr vom andern Stern	Manager	
1948	The Original Sin		
1948	Die kupferne Hochzeit	Georg	
1949	Trouble Backstairs	Gustav Kluge, Bäckermeister	
1950	Who Is This That I Love?	Felix	
1950	Hochzeitsnacht im Paradies	Dr. Fritz Oberländer	
1951	Das seltsame Leben des Herrn Bruggs	Holsten, Detektiv	
1952	Desires		Uncredited
1952	That Can Happen to Anyone	Stahlschmidt	
1952	The Devil Makes Three	Oberlitz	
1952	Fritz and Friederike	Dr. Per Högstad, Armeepsychologe	
1952	Carnival in White	Dr. Schlauch	
1952	The Exchange	Adlatus	Uncredited
1953	Captain Bay-Bay	Smutje	
1953	The Postponed Wedding Night	Der stramme Max	
1953	Aunt Jutta from Calcutta	Ferdinand, Diener	
1953	Heartbroken on the Moselle	Weinkenner	
1953	Your Heart Is My Homeland	Wirt	
1953	Jonny Saves Nebrador		
1954	The Sweetest Fruits	Polizeipräsident	
1954	Portrait of an Unknown Woman	Barbesitzer	
1954	Hoheit lassen bitten	Nepomuk	
1954	Don't Worry About Your Mother-in-Law	Direktor Meyer	
1954	The Missing Miniature	Shady figure no. 3	
1955	Des Teufels General	Hauptmann Lüttjohann	
1955	Sergeant Borck	Hauptwachtmeister Sperling	
1955	Operation Sleeping Bag	Oberwachtmeister Kern	
1955	The Mistress of Solderhof	Julius Brecht - genannt "Jule"	
1956	Charley's Aunt	Peter	
1956	Die wilde Auguste	Butler Napoleon	
1956	Mädchen mit schwachem Gedächtnis	Hoteldirektor	
1956	The Captain from Köpenick	Schutzmann Kilian	
1956	Du bist Musik	Kriegsminister	
1956	Die Stimme der Sehnsucht	Beppo	
1956	I'll See You at Lake Constance	Hotelarzt	
1956	Three Birch Trees on the Heath	Kriminalassistent Grimm	
1957	Der Glücksbringer		
1957	Der Etappenhase	Feldgendarm	
1957	The Girl Without Pyjamas	Egon Bruchsal	
1957	Kindermädchen für Papa gesucht	Ernst Bärwald	
1957	Das Glück liegt auf der Straße	Dr. Kalmus	
1957	Love from Paris	Herr von Nr. 17	
1957	Schön ist die Welt	Arno Kühnlein	
1957	Egon, der Frauenheld		
1957	The Legs of Dolores	Adalbert Martens, Vater von Dolores	
1958	Voyage to Italy, Complete with Love	Herr Kümmel	
1958	Night Nurse Ingeborg	Patient Breitmeier	
1958	Girls of the Night	Herr Robbé	
1958	Hoppla, jetzt kommt Eddie	Consul Almeida	
1958	Petersburger Nächte	Nikolai Pawlin	
1958	The Eighth Day of the Week	Stefan Walicki	
1958	Der lachende Vagabund	Emil Hollebusch	
1958	The Girl with the Cat's Eyes	Police Commissioner Krause	
1958	My Ninety Nine Brides	Herr Reif	
1958	Der Schinderhannes	Polizeidirektor von Mainz	
1959	Schlag auf Schlag	Hermann Marek	
1959	Crime After School	1. Gerichtsdiener Willi Störtebecker	
1959	Der Schinderhannes	Maat	
1960	Der Held meiner Träume		
1960	Die Brücke des Schicksals		
1960	The Young Sinner	Hehedorn	
1961	Schön ist die Liebe am Königssee	Franz Otto, Kunde im Reisebüro	
1961	Bankraub in der Rue Latour	Kassierer	
1961	Three Men in a Boat	Melman	
1962	Liebe, Krach und Himmelbett		
1964	Das Haus auf dem Hügel	Chefinspektor Leon Vaudrac	
1965	Die Schlüssel	Lancelot Harris	TV miniseries, 2 episodes
1965	Who Wants to Sleep?		
19666	The Investigation	Defendant Kaduk	TV film
1969–1972	Salto Mortale	Zirkusinspektor Horn	TV series, 14 episodes, (final appearance)
1970	Wer weint denn schon im Freudenhaus?	Krautenschulte, Ministerialrat	
1970	Immer bei Vollmond	Hausmeister	
