= Heino Gaze =

German composer (1908–1967)

- Born: 20 February 1908; Halle, German Empire
- Died: 24 October 1967 (aged 59); West Berlin, West Germany
- Occupation: Composer
- Years active: 1952–1966 (film)

Heino Gaze (20 February 1908 – 24 October 1967) was a German composer. He worked on more than thirty film scores during his career.

He composed "La Le Lu (nur der Mann im Mond schaut zu)", sung by Heinz Rühmann in the film Wenn der Vater mit dem Sohne. His song "Kalkutta liegt am Ganges" became a hit in the United States when it was performed by Lawrence Welk under the title "Calcutta".

== Selected filmography ==
- Homesick for You (1952)
- Cuba Cabana (1952)
- Pension Schöller (1952)
- Lady's Choice (1953)
- Dutch Girl (1953)
- Hit Parade (1953)
- Josef the Chaste (1953)
- Money from the Air (1954)
- A Heart Full of Music (1955)
- Heaven Is Never Booked Up (1955)
- Wenn der Vater mit dem Sohne (1955)
- Request Concert (1955)
- Tired Theodore (1957)
- Victor and Victoria (1957)
- Beneath the Palms on the Blue Sea (1957)
- Widower with Five Daughters (1957)
- Father, Mother and Nine Children (1958)
- Triplets on Board (1959)
- That's No Way to Land a Man (1959)
- The High Life (1960)
- Snow White and the Seven Jugglers (1962)
- A Holiday Like Never Before (1963)

== Bibliography ==
- Fritsche, Maria. Homemade Men in Postwar Austrian Cinema: Nationhood, Genre and Masculinity. Berghahn Books, 2013.
