= Ursula Justin =

German actress (1927–2024)

- Born: 16 October 1927; Altena, Westphalia, Germany
- Died: 5 January 2024 (aged 96); Überlingen, Germany
- Years active: 1952–1955 (film)

Ursula Justin (16 October 1927 – 5 January 2024) was a German stage and film actress. She starred in six films during the 1950s, all of them directed by her husband Géza von Cziffra. Justin died on 5 January 2024, at the age of 96.

== Filmography ==
- Dancing Stars (1952)
- The Singing Hotel (1953)
- The Flower of Hawaii (1953)
- Dancing in the Sun (1954)
- Money from the Air (1954)
- Bandits of the Autobahn (1955)

== Bibliography ==
- Goble, Alan. The Complete Index to Literary Sources in Film. Walter de Gruyter, 1999.
