= The Stolen Trousers =

1956 film

- DVD cover
- Directed by: Géza von Cziffra
- Written by: Gustav Kampendonk; Géza von Cziffra
- Produced by: Otto Meissner
- Starring: Susanne Cramer; Ruth Stephan; Peter Weck
- Cinematography: Siegfried Hold; Willy Winterstein
- Edited by: Helga Kaminski
- Music by: Michael Jary
- Production company: Deutsche London-Film
- Distributed by: Deutsche Film Hansa
- Release date: 17 May 1956
- Running time: 87 minutes
- Country: West Germany
- Language: German

The Stolen Trousers (German: Die gestohlene Hose) is a 1956 West German comedy film directed by Géza von Cziffra and starring Susanne Cramer, Ruth Stephan and Peter Weck. Emerging comedy star Heinz Erhardt appeared in a supporting role. It was shot at the Göttingen Studios. The film's sets were designed by the art director Ernst Schomer.

== Cast ==
- Susanne Cramer as Edith Martens
- Siegfried Breuer Jr. as Hans Wellner
- Ruth Stephan as Grete Giesemann
- Peter Weck as Toni von Rabenstein
- Margarete Haagen as Tante Amalie
- Oskar Sima as Sebastian Wellner
- Heinz Erhardt as Ferdinand Kofler
- Hubert von Meyerinck as Signore Ricoli
- Beppo Brem as Gendarm
- Lotte Lang as Koechin
- Rudi Hofstätter as Heurigensaenger
- Rudolf Carl as Hausmeister
- Paul Westermeier as Wilhelm Meyer

== Bibliography ==
- Hans-Michael Bock and Tim Bergfelder. The Concise Cinegraph: An Encyclopedia of German Cinema. Berghahn Books, 2009.
