= The Night of the Storm =

1957 West German drama film by Falk Harnack

- Directed by: Falk Harnack
- Written by: Klaus Hellmer (novel); Gina Kaus; Answald Krüger; Maria Matray; Heinz Oskar Wuttig
- Produced by: Artur Brauner; Horst Wendlandt
- Starring: Lilli Palmer; Ivan Desny; Willy A. Kleinau
- Cinematography: Friedl Behn-Grund
- Edited by: Hannelore Friedrich; Kurt Zeunert
- Music by: Herbert Trantow
- Production company: CCC Film
- Distributed by: Neue Filmverleih
- Release date: 7 March 1957
- Running time: 102 minutes
- Country: West Germany
- Language: German

The Night of the Storm or Tempestuous Love (German: Wie ein Sturmwind) is a 1957 West German drama film directed by Falk Harnack and starring Lilli Palmer, Ivan Desny and Willy A. Kleinau.

It was made at the Spandau Studios in Berlin with sets designed by Ernst Schomer and Hans Jürgen Kiebach. Location shooting took place in Munich and Messina in Italy.

== Cast ==
- Lilli Palmer as Marianne Eichler
- Ivan Desny as Viktor Ledin
- Willy A. Kleinau as Friedrich Eichler
- Susanne Cramer as Gina
- Siegfried Schürenberg as Herterich
- Käthe Braun as Beate Hoberg
- Peter Capell as Dr. Baumgarten
- Karl Hellmer
- Hans Hessling
- Ralph Lothar as Kuelz
- Friedrich Maurer as Prokurist Wechsler
- Arthur Schröder as Richter
- Alexa von Porembsky as Emmy
- Peter Uwe Witt as Horst
- Konrad Wagner as Dr. Brandes

== Bibliography ==
- Bock, Hans-Michael; Bergfelder, Tim, eds. (2009). The Concise CineGraph: Encyclopedia of German Cinema. Berghahn Books. ISBN 978-1-57181-655-9.
