= Erwin Strahl =

Austrian actor

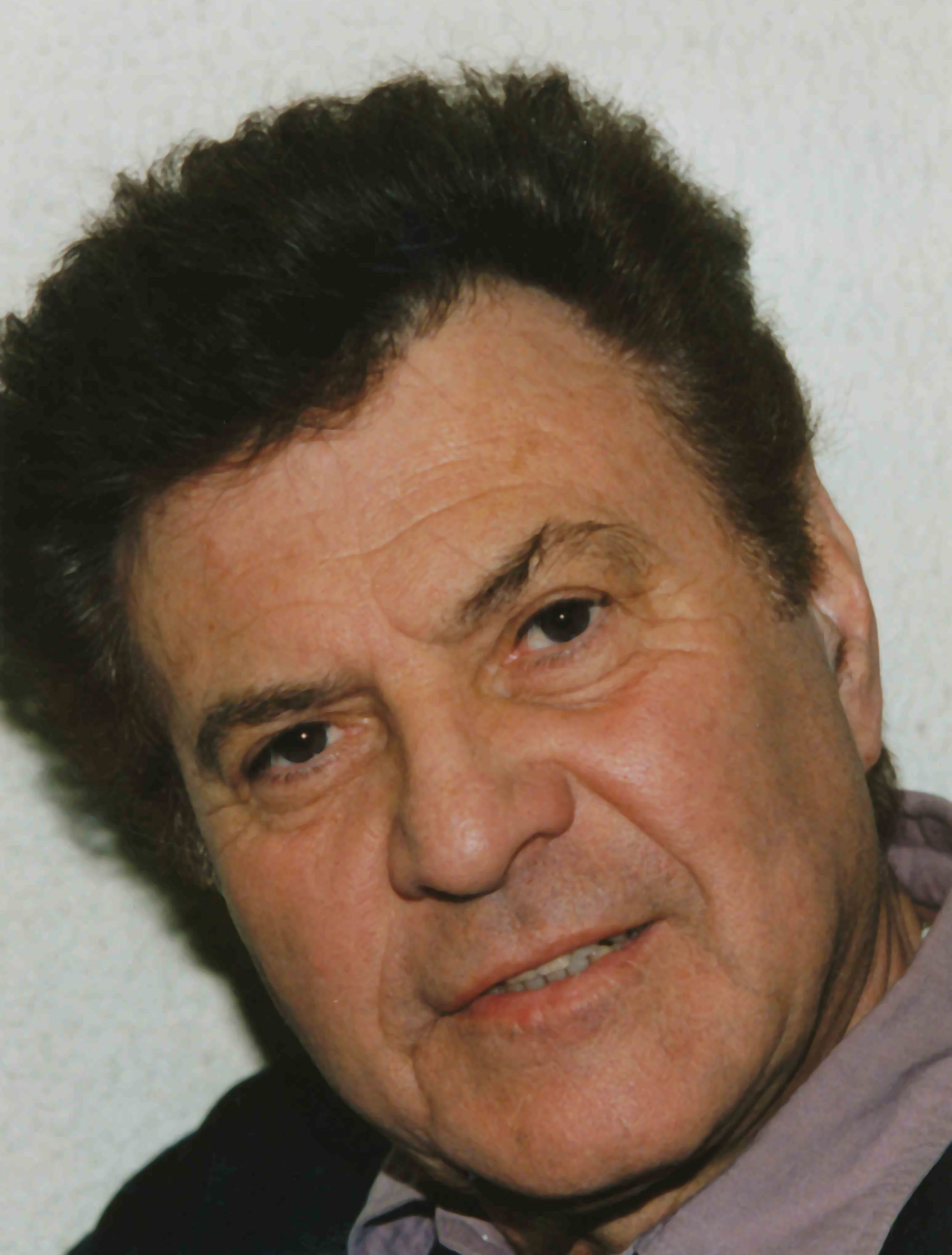
- Born: 12 February 1929; Vienna, Austria
- Died: 20 April 2011 (aged 82); Vienna, Austria
- Occupation: Film actor
- Years active: 1949–2011

Erwin Strahl (12 February 1929 – 20 April 2011) was an Austrian actor. From 1966 until his death, he was married to Austrian actress Waltraut Haas.

He died on 20 April 2011 at the age of 82.

== Filmography ==
Year	Title	Role	Notes
1949	Vom Mädchen zur Frau	Walter, der anständige junge Mann	
1952	Abenteuer im Schloss	Walter	
1953	The Spendthrift	Baron Flitterstein	
1953	Southern Nights	Renato	
1953	Your Heart Is My Homeland	Andreas Möbius	
1953	Franz Schubert	Johann Mayerhofer	
1954	Hochzeitsglocken		
1954	Dein Mund verspricht mir Liebe	Paul Hohenfels	
1954	A Parisian in Rome	Riccardo / Richard Koster	
1954	On the Reeperbahn at Half Past Midnight	Bilek	
1955	Die heilige Lüge		
1955	Three Days Confined to Barracks	Oberleutnant von Feldern	
1956	In Hamburg When the Nights Are Long	Hans Karst	
1956	I'll See You at Lake Constance	Klaus	
1956	The Hunter of Fall	Blasi, Sohn des Huisenbauern	
1957	Für zwei Groschen Zärtlichkeit	Luigi Moretti	
1957	Vienna, City of My Dreams	Mirko, ein alanischer Emissär	
1958	Mikosch, the Pride of the Company		
1959	Der Frosch mit der Maske	Sergeant Balder aka Nummer 7	
1960	Five Branded Women		
1960	Flitterwochen in der Hölle	Michael Damon	
1961	Robert and Bretram	Franco	
1961	Les honneurs de la guerre	Le sergent Gerke	
1962	Romance in Venice	Nikolaus	
1963	Seelische Grausamkeit	Jo	
1963	The Invisible Terror		
1964	Schweik's Years of Indiscretion	Oberleutnant Gustl Wiedenstein	
1966	The Murderer with the Silk Scarf	Toni Stein	
1966	Happy End am Wolfgangsee	James Sander	
1968	Kommissar X - Drei blaue Panther	Inspektor Lefèvre	
1968	God's Police Patrol	Playboy	
1970	Schwarzer Nerz auf zarter Haut	Prof. Dr. Max Hergarten	
1970	Keine Angst Liebling, ich pass schon auf	Corrado Carusello	
1971	The Honest Interview	John	
1988	War and Remembrance	Radio Announcer (Berlin)	1 episode
1991	Eye of the Widow	Franz	
