= Deutsche London Film =

German film company

Deutsche London Film or Deutsche London-Film (German: Deutsche London Filmverleih) was a West German film distribution company active from 1940 to 1956. Handling both domestic productions and imports, and concentrating on popular film genres, it established itself as one of the bigger distributors. This took place during the economic recovery of the German film industry in the post-Second World War period, as audiences reached peak numbers by the mid-1950s.

It was founded in Hamburg by Karl Julius Fritzsche, a former head of production at the major studio Tobis Film, but lost momentum following his death in 1954. Located in what had been placed into the British Zone it released productions by Alexander Korda's London Films, including That Hamilton Woman, Lydia, An Ideal Husband, The Winslow Boy, The Third Man and Hobson's Choice. In 1950, it distributed a wartime Austrian film The Heart Must Be Silent starring Paula Wessely. As German production levels rose, it handled a growing number of German-made films.

In 1955 the company stated that few German crime films were made anymore due to a lack of popular demand. A few years later the genre was revived by the rival Rialto Film's series of Edgar Wallace's adaptations.

== Selected filmography ==
- The Heart Must Be Silent (1950)
- The White Hell of Pitz Palu (1950)
- Das seltsame Leben des Herrn Bruggs (1951)
- Torreani (1951)
- The Merry Vineyard (1952)
- Pension Schöller (1952)
- The Exchange (1952)
- Don't Ask My Heart (1952)
- The Great Temptation (1952)
- Diary of a Married Woman (1953)
- Arlette Conquers Paris (1953)
- The Singing Hotel (1953)
- A Musical War of Love (1953)
- Red Roses, Red Lips, Red Wine (1953)
- Life Begins at Seventeen (1953)
- Everything for Father (1953)
- Annie from Tharau (1954)
- Confession Under Four Eyes (1954)
- The Eternal Waltz (1954)
- Walking Back into the Past (1954)
- Captain Wronski (1954)
- Three from Variety (1954)
- Operation Edelweiss (1954)
- Dancing in the Sun (1954)
- Don't Worry About Your Mother-in-Law (1954)
- Money from the Air (1954)
- Confession Under Four Eyes (1954)
- The False Adam (1955)
- Your Life Guards (1955)
- Mamitschka (1955)
- One Woman Is Not Enough? (1955)
- Three Men in the Snow (1955)
- Three Days Confined to Barracks (1955)
- André and Ursula (1955)
- The Barrings (1955)
- Friederike von Barring (1956)
- Spy for Germany (1956)
- The Stolen Trousers (1956)
- Winter in the Woods (1956)
- The Story of Anastasia (1956)

== Bibliography ==
- Clemens, Gabriele. Britische Kulturpolitik in Deutschland 1945-1949: Literatur, Film, Musik und Theater. Franz Steiner Verlag, 1997.
- Davidson, John & Hake, Sabine (ed.) Framing the Fifties: Cinema in a Divided Germany. Berghahn Books, 2007.
- Fisher, Jaimey (ed.). Generic Histories of German Cinema: Genre and Its Deviations. Boydell & Brewer, 2013.
