= Winter in the Woods (1956 film) =

Film by Wolfgang Liebeneiner

- Film poster
- Directed by: Wolfgang Liebeneiner
- Written by: Frank Dimen; Alf Teichs; Werner P. Zibaso
- Produced by: Willie Hoffmann-Andersen; Fritz Hoppe; Alf Teichs
- Starring: Claus Holm
- Cinematography: Bruno Mondi
- Edited by: Martha Dübber
- Music by: Peter Igelhoff
- Production company: Apollo-Film
- Distributed by: Deutsche London-Film
- Release date: 26 March 1956
- Running time: 97 minutes
- Country: West Germany
- Language: German

Winter in the Woods (German: Waldwinter) is a 1956 German drama film directed by Wolfgang Liebeneiner and starring Claus Holm. It is a remake of the 1936 film Winter in the Woods. The film's sets were designed by the art directors Paul Markwitz and Fritz Maurischat. Location shooting took place at Viechtach in Bavaria.

== Cast ==
- Claus Holm as Martin
- Sabine Bethmann as Marianne
- Rudolf Forster as Baron Malte
- Helen Thimig as Baronin Henny
- Willy A. Kleinau as Verwalter Stengel
- Susanne Cramer as Inge Sternitzke
- Gert Fröbe as Gerstenberg
- Klaus Kinski as Otto Hartwig
- Ilse Steppat as Frieda Stengel
- Erica Beer as Simone
- Herbert A.E. Böhme as Sternitzke
- Beppo Brem as Huber
- Karl Hellmer as Kruttke
- Margarete Haagen as Kraeutermarie
- Alexander Engel as Seifert
- Otz Tollen as Diener Baumann
- Joachim Boldt as Kuhn
- Uwe Witt as Franz Sternitzke
- Fritz Wagner

== Bibliography ==
- Von Moltke, Johannes (2005). No Place Like Home: Locations of Heimat in German Cinema. Berkeley: University of California Press. ISBN 978-0-520-93859-5.
