= Wenn der Vater mit dem Sohne =

1955 film

- Directed by: Hans Quest
- Written by: Hans Grimm (story); Gustav Kampendonk &; Eckart Hachfeld
- Produced by: Kurt Ulrich (producer)
- Starring: See below
- Cinematography: Kurt Schulz
- Edited by: Hermann Leitner
- Music by: Heino Gaze
- Production companies: Berolina film; Kurt Ulrich Filmproduktion
- Distributed by: Constantin Film
- Release date: 11 August 1955
- Running time: 95 minutes
- Country: West Germany
- Language: German

Wenn der Vater mit dem Sohne is a 1955 West German film directed by Hans Quest.

It was shot at the Tempelhof Studios in Berlin.

== Plot summary ==
Teddy Lemke is a lodger with Miss Biermann. She has taken six-year-old Ulli into her care, whose mother emigrated to America. Teddy Lemke takes good care of the little Ulli – as if he were his own son. When Ulli surprises Teddy with a children's clown costume, which he accidentally found in the attic, Teddy hesitantly tells the story of his life: Formerly he was a famous clown who performed together with his son. When the boy died, Teddy ended his career.

Ulli persuades Teddy to return to the stage, and from then on they perform together. Their immediate success leads to an offer for a longer engagement. At this moment Ulli's mother Gerti, who is now married, returns from America to take Ulli back with her. Teddy flees with Ulli from Berlin to Switzerland, pursued by the child's mother, her husband, and several assistants. Finally Ulli moves with his parents to America, and Teddy, who reluctantly comes to terms with it, gives a sad solo performance at the end.

== Cast ==
- Heinz Rühmann as Teddy Lemke
- Oliver Grimm as Ulli
- Waltraut Haas as Gerti
- Robert Freitag as Roy Bentley
- Sybil Werden as Jane
- Fita Benkhoff as Fräulein Biermann
- Carl-Heinz Schroth as Peepe
- Pero Alexander as Donald Crossman
- Herbert Kiper as Miller – Agent
- Hans Schwarz Jr. as Samson
- Rudolf Schündler as Herr im Laden
- Heidi Becker as Helga
- Arnim Dahl as Kunstspringer

== Soundtrack ==
- René Carol and Detlev Lais "La-Le-Lu" (Music by Heino Gaze, lyrics by Bruno Balz)
