= Mona Baptiste =

Trinidadian singer and actress (1926–1993)

Background information
- Born: 21 June 1926; Port of Spain, Trinidad and Tobago
- Died: 25 June 1993 (aged 67) Dublin, Ireland
- Genres: Calypso; Blues
- Occupations: Singer actress
- Instrument: Vocals
- Years active: 1949–71

Mona Baptiste (21 June 1926 (Note: Her year of birth has often erroneously been given as 1928) – 25 June 1993) was a Trinidad and Tobago-born singer and actress in London and Germany. She was largely popular from songs such as "Calypso Blues" and "There's Something in the Air". She also acted in multiple musical films, including Dancing in the Sun (Tanz in der Sonne, 1954).

== Life and career ==
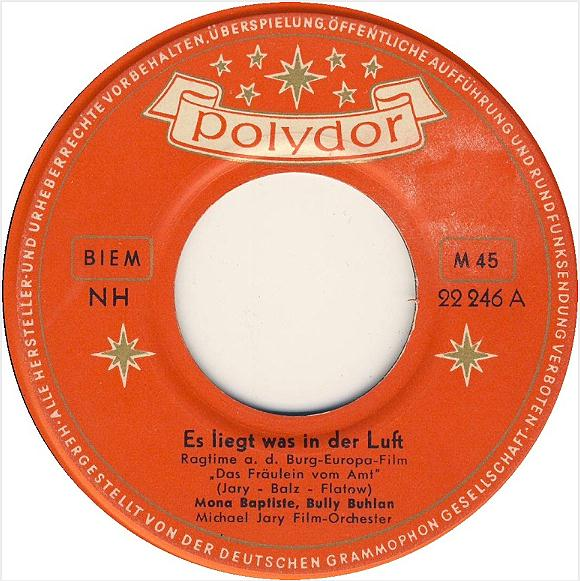
Cover from the Single "Es liegt was in der Luft" (1954), by Bully Buhlan and Baptiste.

Born into a well-known family in Port of Spain, Trinidad and Tobago, on 21 June 1926, one of five sisters, Mona Baptiste was 14 when she began singing on the radio and at dances, later becoming involved with the Little Carib Theatre. She migrated to England in 1948 on the HMT Empire Windrush, which arrived at Tilbury Docks, Essex, on 22 June, the day after her 22nd birthday. One of the few women on the ship, she had travelled first class. While she presented herself as a clerk to London immigration, she began working towards her singing career very soon afterwards. In August that year, she was booked to appear on BBC Radio and performed alongside Lord Beginner (Egbert Moore), who had also travelled on the Empire Windrush.

Over the next few years, she appeared in the British music magazine New Musical Express for events such as signing with Cab Kaye to sing with the Cabinettes, appearing on the television show Coloured Follies, and appearing on the British radio variety show Brandbox in 1949. She also started singing at Quaglino's restaurant and their Allegro to great success in 1950. In 1951, she worked Ted Heath's band and other jazz groups, and recorded for Melodisc her version of "Calypso Blues", a song originally performed by Nat King Cole. She also sang "Calypso Blues" with the Brute Force Steel Band on the 1957 Cook Records album Beauty and the Brute Force.

Invited by Yves Montand to Paris, she appeared at top cabaret spot La Nouvelle Eve, and went on to perform in Belgium and Germany, where she was a great success and decided to settle. In Germany, where she had a house in Krefeld, she gained recognition for her popular songs such as "There's Something in the Air" and movie appearances including in the 1954 films Tanz in der Sonne and An jedem Finger zehn, as well as starring in Porgy and Bess for East German television.

Baptiste was married to Michael Carle, whom she had met in London; after his death in a car accident in 1958 when their son Marcel was aged five, she retired. In 1972, she moved to Ireland, where her second husband was from, and in the 1970s she tried to make a comeback, which was unsuccessful.

After suffering a stroke, she died aged 65, on 25 June 1993 in Dublin, Ireland, where she had lived for thirty years with her second husband, Liam Morrison. (Her place of death was erroneously reported as Krefeld in Der Spiegel.) She was buried in Deans Grange Cemetery.

== In popular culture ==
Baptiste is the subject of a 2022 picture book, We Sang Across the Sea: The Empire Windrush and Me, written by Benjamin Zephaniah and illustrated by Onyinye Iwu. Also in 2022, a full-length biography of Baptiste was published, entitled 'What about the Princess?' The Life and Times of Mona Baptiste, written by Bill Hern and David Gleave, with a foreword by Arthur Torrington.

== Discography ==
- 1953: "Merci Beaucoup" / "Wer Mich Küßt, Ist Gefangen" (Shellac, 10")
- 1954: "Wo Ist Der Eine?" / "Ja, Das Küssen" (7", Single)
- 1954: Mona Baptiste, Bully Buhlan, Michael Jary Film-Orchester* – "Es Liegt Was in Der Luft" / "Liebesgeständnis (Aber Bei Nacht)" (Shellac, 10", Single)
- 1955: "O Jackie-Joe" (7", Single, Mono)
- 1956: Mona Baptiste Presents (7", EP)
- 1956: Mona Baptiste, Bully Buhlan – "Eine Frau Muß Man Küssen" (7", Single)
- 1956: "A Woman's Love Is Never Done" / "You're Wrong, All Wrong" (Shellac, 10")
- 1956: Mona Baptiste Presents Volume 2 (7", EP)
- 1956: "Vorbei..." / "No, No, No" (7", Single)
- 1957: Mona Baptiste, Roberto Del Gado Y Su Conjunto – Tales of the Caribbean (7", EP)
- 1959: "Die Mädchen Aus Der Mambo-Bar" • "Boy, Komm Und Küß Mich" (7", Single, Mono)
- 1970: "When Joey Comes Around" / "Baby, This Is Fate" (7")
- 1971: "Come And Live in My World" (7", Single)

== Filmography ==
- The Telephone Operator (1954)
- Tanz in der Sonne (1954)
- Ten on Every Finger (1954)
- How Do I Become a Film Star? (1955)
- The Star of Rio (1955)
- Symphonie in Gold (1956)
- Girls for the Mambo-Bar (1959)
- Sin with a Discount (1968)

== See also ==
- Cab Kaye
