= Willy A. Kleinau =

German actor

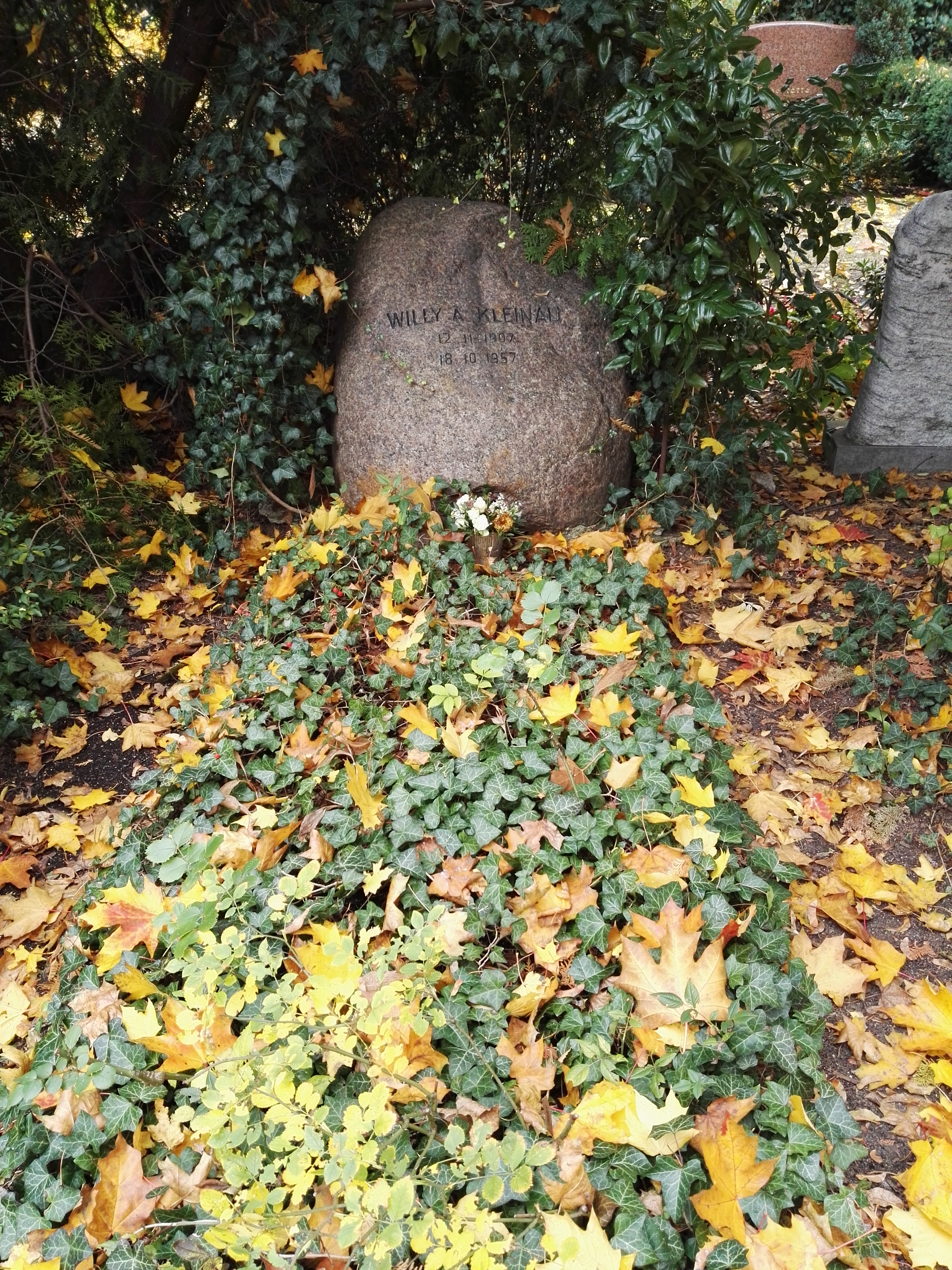
Gravesite of Willy A. Kleinau at the Dorotheenstadt cemetery

Willy A. Kleinau (1907–1957) was a German actor.

== Partial filmography ==
- Hafenmelodie (1949)
- Second Hand Destiny (1949) - Ebeling
- The Blue Swords (1949) - August der Starke
- The Council of the Gods (1950) - Mr. Lawson
- The Axe of Wandsbek (1951) - SS-Standartenführer Hans Peter Footh
- Story of a Young Couple (1952) - Dr. Ulrich Plisch
- Karriere in Paris (1952) - Vautrin
- Shadow over the Islands (1952) - Bassen Brause
- Die Unbesiegbaren (1953) - Herr Schulz
- Kein Hüsung (1954) - Oll Daniel
- Gefährliche Fracht (1954) - Tetje Köhlermann
- Carola Lamberti – Eine vom Zirkus (1954) - Taxichauffeur
- Der Teufel vom Mühlenberg (1955) - Mühlmann
- Das Fräulein von Scuderi (1955) - René Cardillac
- Ein Polterabend (1955) - Guckkastenmann
- Love, Dance and a Thousand Songs (1955) - Luigi
- The Bath in the Barn (1956) - Müllermeister Klas
- Winter in the Woods (1956) - Verwalter Stengel
- The Czar and the Carpenter (1956) - van Bett, Bürgermeister von Saardam
- Der Hauptmann von Köpenick (1956) - Friedrich Hoprecht
- My Brother Joshua (1956) - Mathias Bruckner
- Was die Schwalbe sang (1956) - Forester Mahnke
- The Night of the Storm (1957) - Friedrich Eichler
- Spielbank-Affäre (1957) - Martinez
- Spring in Berlin (1957) - Grieche aus Los Angeles
- Die Schönste (1957) - Alexander Berndorf
- Reifender Sommer (1959) - Erich Kattner (final film role)
