= Don Frankenfeld =

American politician (born 1948)

Member of the South Dakota Senate
- In office 1977–1984

Personal details
- Born: February 13, 1948 (age 78) Chicago, Illinois
- Party: Republican
- Spouse: Jean Kingsbury
- Children: two
- Education: Yale University (BA), Harvard University (MBA, MPA)
- Profession: stock broker

Donald L. Frankenfeld (born February 13, 1948) is an American former politician. He served in the South Dakota Senate from 1977 to 1984.
