= Father, Mother and Nine Children =

1958 film

- Directed by: Erich Engels
- Written by: Erich Engels; Wolf Neumeister
- Produced by: Otto Meissner
- Starring: Heinz Erhardt; Camilla Spira; Corny Collins
- Cinematography: Albert Benitz
- Edited by: Martha Dübber
- Music by: Heino Gaze; Heinrich Riethmüller
- Production company: Deutsche Film Hansa
- Distributed by: Deutsche Film Hansa
- Release date: 19 December 1958
- Running time: 95 minutes
- Country: West Germany
- Language: German

Father, Mother and Nine Children (German: Vater, Mutter und neun Kinder) is a 1958 West German comedy film directed by Erich Engels and starring Heinz Erhardt, Camilla Spira and Corny Collins.

The film's sets were designed by the art director Walter Haag.

== Synopsis ==
Friedrich Schiller, a baker and respected family man with nine children, is wrongly suspected of having an affair with his employer's wife.

== Cast ==
- Heinz Erhardt as Friedrich Schiller
- Camilla Spira as Martha Schiller
- Corny Collins as Thea Schiller
- Maria Sebaldt as Lollo Kueppers
- Erik Schumann as Francois Dupont
- Willy Millowitsch as Anton
- Pero Alexander as Klaus Fürbringer
- Elke Aberle as Julchen Schiller
- Renate Küster as Regine Dupont, geb. Schiller
- Gaby Steffan as Luise
- Monika Ahrens as Lene
- Margitta Scherr as Anni
- Ernst Reinhold as Karl
- Thomas Braut as Hans
- Harald Martens as Eduard "Ede" Schiller
- Reiner Brönneke as Heinz Horstmann
- Werner Finck as Herr Zellhorn, Fürbringers Vermieter

== Bibliography ==
- Hans-Michael Bock and Tim Bergfelder. The Concise Cinegraph: An Encyclopedia of German Cinema. Berghahn Books, 2009.
