= I Was All His =

1958 film

- Directed by: Wolfgang Becker
- Written by: Curt Cäsar Winter; Kurt Heuser
- Produced by: Klaus Stapenhorst
- Starring: Barbara Rütting; Carlos Thompson; Wolfgang Preiss
- Cinematography: Kurt Hasse
- Edited by: Wolfgang Flaum
- Music by: Klaus Ogermann
- Production company: Carlton-Film
- Distributed by: Deutsche Cosmopol Film
- Release date: 2 April 1958
- Running time: 101 minutes
- Country: West Germany
- Language: German

I Was All His (German: Ich war ihm hörig) is a 1958 West German drama film directed by Wolfgang Becker and starring Barbara Rütting, Carlos Thompson and Wolfgang Preiss. It was shot at the Carlton Studios in Munich and on location in the city. The film's sets were designed by the art director Wolf Englert.

== Cast ==
- Barbara Rütting as Anette Klinger
- Carlos Thompson as Nikolei Stein
- Wolfgang Preiss as Dr. Leipold
- Kai Fischer as Kätzchen
- Corny Collins as Renate
- Siegfried Lowitz as Herr Hinze
- Lina Carstens as Frau Mertens
- Lukas Ammann as Dessouki
- Michl Lang as Herr Mertens
- Maria Stadler as Lene

== Bibliography ==
- James Robert Parish. Film Directors Guide: Western Europe. Scarecrow Press, 1976.
