= Corny Collins =

German actress (born 1933)

- Born: 18 December 1933 (age 92); Berlin, Germany
- Occupation: Actress
- Years active: 1957–1991 (film)

Corny Collins (born 18 December 1933) is a German retired actress. She was married to the actor Christian Wolff.

== Her life ==
After leaving school, Corny Collins completed an apprenticeship as a medical assistant. Günter Pfitzmann discovered her at a theater doctor for the cabaret. There she performed with Wolfgang Neuss and Ursula Herking. In order to advance professionally, she took acting lessons. She made her first theater appearance in the play Ein Tag im siebten Himmel. The director and actor Axel von Ambesser noticed her talent and hired her in 1957 for a role in the film Die Freundin meines Mannes, together with Peter Kraus. Although Corny Collins was now already 25 years old, she continued to play teenage roles in films. As a voice actress, she lent her voice to Ruby Dee (Black Power) and Marion Ross in the family series Happy Days, among others.

From the mid-1960s, she was increasingly seen in television productions. She made her last film, Journey of No Return, in 1989, after which she only appeared on stage.

== Selected filmography ==
- Voyage to Italy, Complete with Love (1958)
- Father, Mother and Nine Children (1958)
- My Ninety Nine Brides (1958)
- The Muzzle (1958)
- Immer die Radfahrer (1958)
- I Was All His (1958)
- Heart Without Mercy (1958)
- Freddy, the Guitar and the Sea (1959)
- The Merry War of Captain Pedro (1959)
- Crime After School (1959)
- The Day the Rains Came (1959)
- Until Money Departs You (1960)
- Genosse Münchhausen (1962)
- The Post Has Gone (1962)
- Wild Water (1962)
- The Indian Scarf (1963)
- A Holiday Like Never Before (1963)
- ...denn die Musik und die Liebe in Tirol (1963)
- If You Go Swimming in Tenerife (1964)
- Tim Frazer and the Mysterious Mister X (1964)
- High Season for Spies (1966)
- Hotel by the Hour (1970)
- We Two (1970)
- The Priest of St. Pauli (1970)

== Bibliography ==
- Bergfelder, Tim. International Adventures: German Popular Cinema and European Co-productions in the 1960s. Berghahn Books, 2005.
