= Peter Frankenfeld =

German comedian

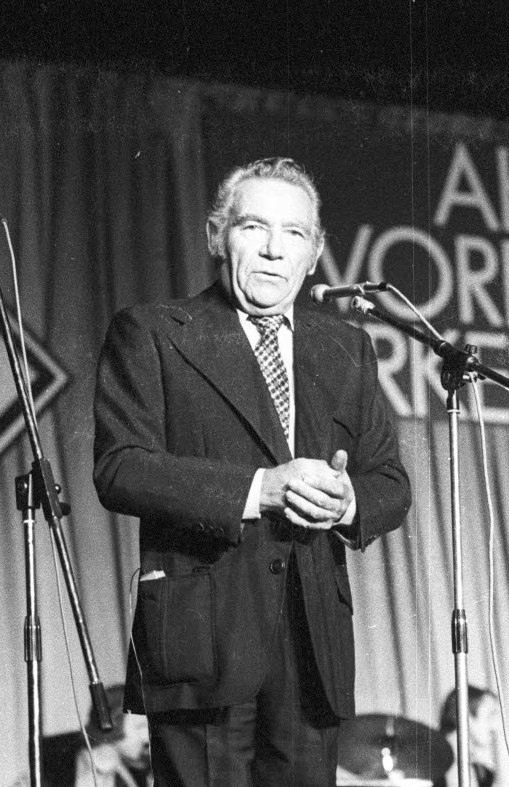
Peter Frankenfeld (1975)

Peter Frankenfeld (born Willi Julius August Frankenfeldt; 31 May 1913 in Berlin – 4 January 1979 in Hamburg) was a German comedian, radio and television personality.

After World War II he became an interpreter with the U.S. military government. In 1948 he went into broadcasting. He pioneered quiz programs on West German radio and television, becoming the country's best-known programme host and entertainer. He is remembered for some classic sketches such as "Der Überzieher" (about a man getting in trouble in a restaurant because he has to constantly guard his overcoat), "Die Bürgschaft" (his bumbling attempt to recite Schiller's poem The Hostage), or "Die Wetterkarte" (The Weather Chart, where he speaks in a wide variety of German dialects).

In 1962, he and director Heinz Dunkhase discovered the comedy sketch Dinner for One in Blackpool which was staged in Frankenfeld's live show shortly thereafter, and recorded on 8 July 1963. The show was re-run occasionally on German television until it got its fixed spot on New Year's Eve in 1972.

He was married to the singer Lonny Kellner.
