= Voyage to Italy, Complete with Love =

1958 film

- Directed by: Wolfgang Becker
- Written by: Jochen Huth; Barbara Noack
- Produced by: Artur Brauner; Werner Ludwig
- Starring: Paul Hubschmid; Susanne Cramer; Hannelore Schroth
- Cinematography: Heinz Pehlke
- Edited by: Wolfgang Flaum; Walter Wischniewsky
- Music by: Friedrich Schröder
- Production company: CCC Film
- Distributed by: UFA
- Release date: 14 January 1958
- Running time: 97 minutes
- Country: West Germany
- Language: German

Voyage to Italy, Complete with Love (German: Italienreise – Liebe inbegriffen) is a 1958 West German romantic comedy film directed by Wolfgang Becker and starring Paul Hubschmid, Susanne Cramer and Hannelore Schroth. It was shot at the Spandau Studios in West Berlin with extensive location shooting around Italy including Venice, Assisi, Rome, Naples and Sorrento. The film's sets were designed by the art directors Emil Hasler and Walter Kutz.

== Cast ==
- Paul Hubschmid as Robert Florian
- Susanne Cramer as Ilse Knopf
- Hannelore Schroth as Frl. Herzberg
- Bum Krüger as Herr Kümmel
- Walter Koch as Herbert Knopf
- Walter Feuchtenberg as Herr Primus
- Franz-Otto Krüger as Herr Duevenasch
- Gretl Theimer as Frau Duevenasch
- Walter Janssen as Alter Herr
- Corny Collins as Junges Mädchen
- Walter Giller as Hans Fichte
- Helmut Ahner as Verlobter
- Henry Lorenzen as Reisender
- Molly Robinson as Mrs. Parker
- Toni Ruckstetter
- Mita von Ahlefeldt as Alte Dame
- Ursula von Horn
- Christel von Loosen as Frl. Duevenasch
- Gert Wiedenhofen as Fotograf

== Bibliography ==
- Sabine Schrader & Daniel Winkler. The Cinemas of Italian Migration: European and Transatlantic Narratives. Cambridge Scholars Publishing, 2014.
