= Helmuth Lohner =

Austrian actor in the theatre in der josefstadt from 1997 to 2006

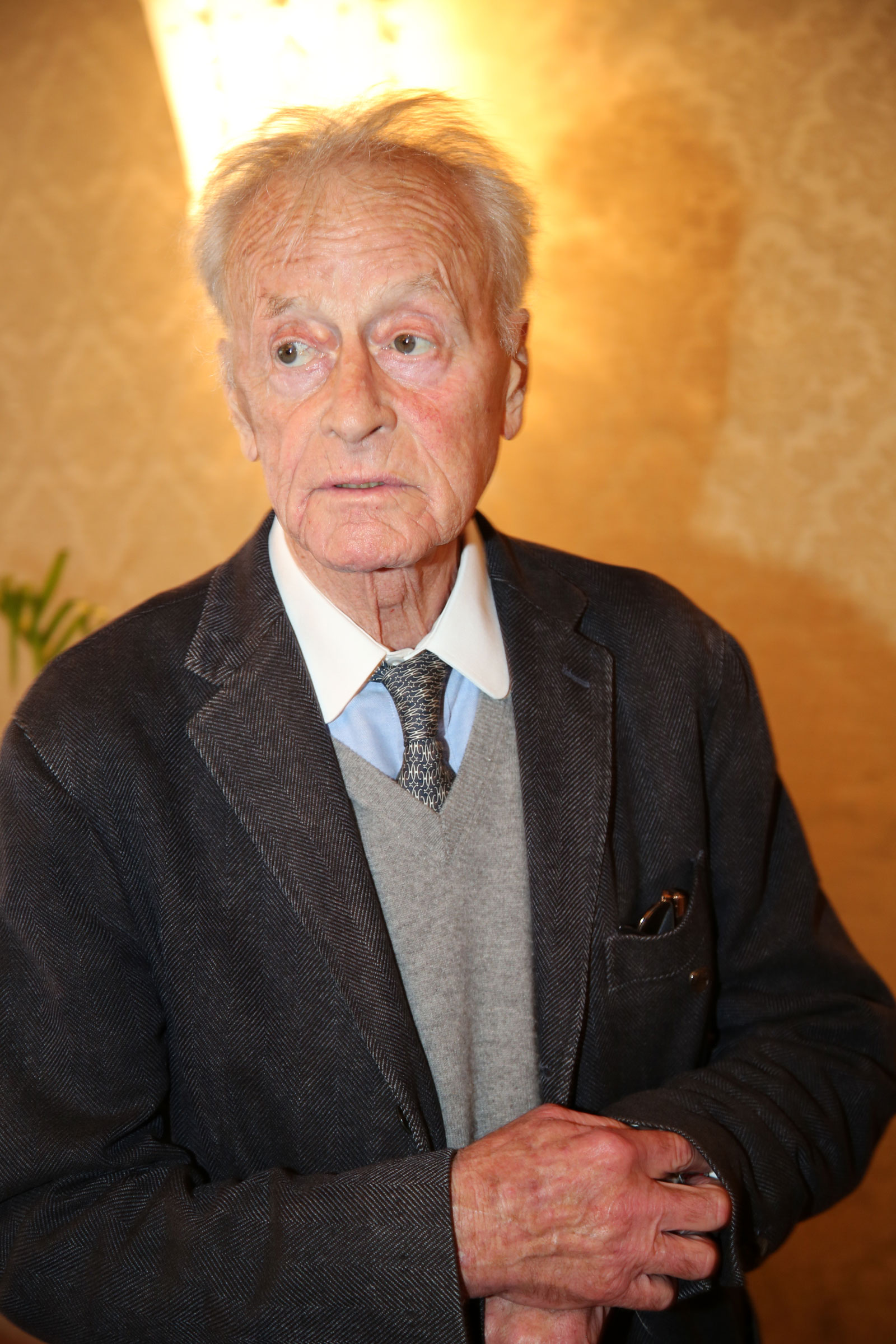
- Lohner in May 2015
- Born: 24 April 1933; Vienna, Austria
- Died: 23 June 2015 (aged 82); Vienna, Austria
- Occupations: Actor, theatre director
- Years active: 1952–2015
- Known for: Director of the Theater in der Josefstadt (1997–2006)
- Spouses: Susanne Cramer (divorced, twice); Karin Baal (divorced); Elisabeth Gürtler (m. 2011)
- Children: 2, including Therese Lohner
- Awards: Kainz Medal (1980); Nestroy Ring (1988); Gold Honorary Medal of Vienna (1991); Kammerschauspieler (1992); Austrian Cross of Honour for Science and Art, 1st class (2003)

Helmuth Lohner (24 April 1933 – 23 June 2015) was an Austrian actor, theatre director, and from 1997 to 2006 director of the Theater in der Josefstadt.

== Early life ==
Born in Vienna, Lohner initially trained as a commercial artist, while also taking private acting lessons. He made his acting début in 1952 at the municipal theatre in Baden bei Wien. He also appeared as operetta buffo at the Stadttheater Klagenfurt. From 1953 to 1963 he appeared in various productions of the Theater in der Josefstadt, as well as making numerous film appearances.

== Career ==
Further engagements in Berlin, Munich, Hamburg, Düsseldorf and Zurich followed. During this period, he appeared at the Burgtheater, and at the Salzburg Festival several times, taking the roles of "Death", "The Devil", and "Jedermann" in Hugo von Hofmannsthal's play Jedermann (which by tradition is performed every year). He made his film debut in 1955 in Josef von Báky's Hotel Adlon. From 1963 he was active in television as actor and director.

== Personal life ==
Lohner married and divorced the German actress Susanne Cramer twice. Their daughter Konstanze Lohner is a pedagogue in Germany. He then married the German actress Karin Baal, with whom he had a daughter, actress Therese Lohner. In 2011, he married Elisabeth Gürtler-Mauthner. The couple lived together for 19 years before their marriage.

== Death ==
Helmuth Lohner died aged 82 on 23 June 2015.

== Selected works ==
=== As opera director ===
- 1994: La belle Hélène by Jacques Offenbach
- 1997: The Merry Widow by Franz Lehár
- 1999: Eine Nacht in Venedig by Johann Strauss II
- 2002: Die Csárdásfürstin by Emmerich Kálmán
- 2005: The Magic Flute by Wolfgang Amadeus Mozart

=== As theatre actor ===
- 1978: Das weite Land by Arthur Schnitzler, directed by Otto Schenk
- 1987: Der einsame Weg by Arthur Schnitzler, directed by Thomas Langhoff
- 1991–1993: Ein Jedermann (Salzburg festival)
- 1999: Figaro lässt sich scheiden by Ödön von Horváth, directed by Luc Bondy

== Partial filmography ==
- Das Licht der Liebe (1954) – (uncredited)
- An der schönen blauen Donau (1955)
- Hotel Adlon (1955) – Erzherzog Karl
- Urlaub auf Ehrenwort (1956) Grenadier Richard Hellwig
- My Sixteen Sons (1956)
- King in Shadow (1957) – Count Holck
- Salzburg Stories (1957) – Franz
- Wie schön, daß es dich gibt (1957) – Rainer
- Widower with Five Daughters (1957) – Dr. Klaus Hellmann
- The Spessart Inn (1958) – Felix
- Stefanie (1958)
- The House of Three Girls (1958) – Moritz von Schwind
- Eva (1959) – Ein Student
- Die schöne Lügnerin (1959) – Martin Graf Waldau / Count Waldau
- Marili (1959) – Peter Markwart
- Mrs. Warren's Profession (1960) – Frank Gardner
- Pension Schöller (1960) – Peter Klapproth
- Immer will ich dir gehören (1960) – Klaus Stettner
- My Husband, the Economic Miracle (1961) – Tommy Schiller – ein Journalist
- Man in the Shadows (1961) – Franz Villinger
- You Must Be Blonde on Capri (1961) – Hannes Niklas
- The Last Chapter (1961) – Oliver Fleming
- Im sechsten Stock (1961) – Jojo, Arbeiter
- So toll wie anno dazumal (1962) – Susannes Traummann #3 (uncredited)
- The Bandit and the Princess (1962) – Nikolaus Tschinderle
- The Seventh Victim (1964) – Gerald Mant
- Radetzkymarsch (1965, TV film) – Carl Joseph von Trotta
- Don Juan oder Die Liebe zur Geometrie (1965, TV film) – Don Juan
- Babeck (1968, TV Mini-Series) – Manfred Krupka
- Hannibal Brooks (1969) – Willi
- Liliom (1971, TV Movie, directed by Otto Schenk) – Liliom
- Der Paukenspieler (1971) – Friedrich Hofstetter
- Merry-Go-Round (1973, directed by Otto Schenk) – The Count
- Derrick: Johanna (1974, TV Series episode) – Alfred Balke
- Aus nichtigem Anlass (1976, TV film) – Ullrich Wältzing
- The Living Corpse (1981, TV film) – Fedor Protasov
- Shalom Pharao (1982) – Joseph (voice)
- Der elegante Hund (1987–1988, TV Series) – Alois Stange
- Sugar (1989, TV Movie) – Leo Kaminski
- Mozart und da Ponte (1989) – Narrator
- The Master of the Day of Judgment (1990, TV film) – Gottfried von Yosch
- Harms (2013) – Onkel
- Village of Silence (2015, TV film) – Hans Perner

== Decorations and awards ==
- 1980 Kainz Medal
- 1988 Nestroy Ring
- 1991 Gold Honorary Medal of Vienna
- 1992 Kammerschauspieler
- 2001 Nestroy nomination for Best Actor
- 2003 Honorary Member of the Theater in der Josefstadt
- 2003 Austrian Cross of Honour for Science and Art, 1st class
- 2006 Gold Medal for services to the City of Vienna
