= The Copper (1958 film) =

Film directed by Eugen York

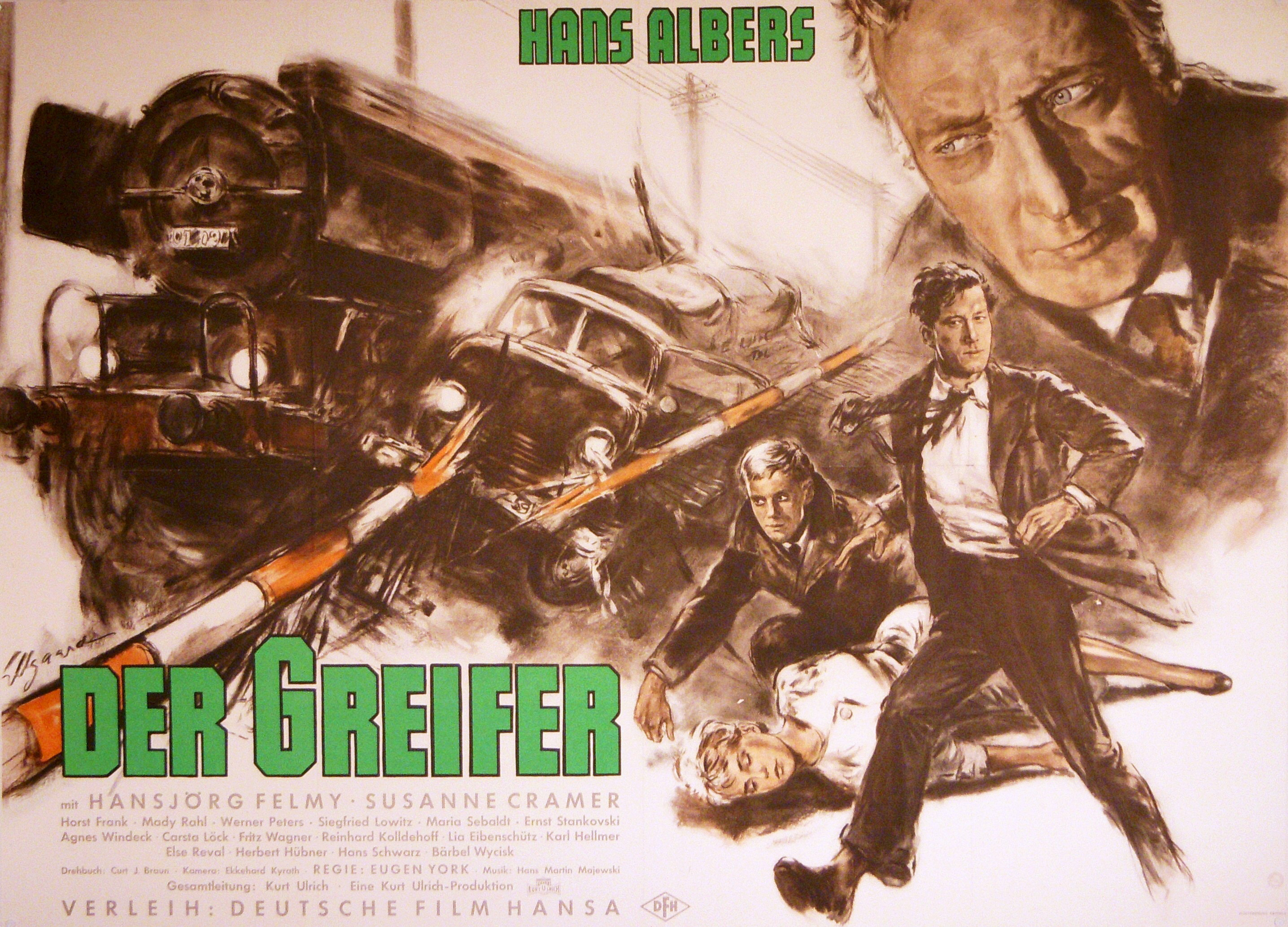
- The film's poster.
- Directed by: Eugen York
- Written by: Curt J. Braun
- Produced by: Kurt Ulrich; Heinz Willeg
- Starring: Hans Albers; Hansjörg Felmy; Susanne Cramer; Ernst Stankovski
- Cinematography: Ekkehard Kyrath; Bruno Mondi
- Edited by: Ingrid Wacker
- Music by: Hans-Martin Majewski
- Production company: Kurt Ulrich Film
- Distributed by: DFH
- Release date: 20 March 1958
- Running time: 96 minutes
- Country: West Germany
- Language: German

The Copper also translated as The Grasper (German: Der Greifer) is a 1958 West German crime film directed by Eugen York and starring Hans Albers, Hansjörg Felmy and Susanne Cramer. It is a remake of the 1930 film The Copper which Albers had also starred in. It was shot at the Tempelhof Studios in West Berlin as well as on location in Hamburg and Essen. The film's sets were designed by the art directors Gabriel Pellon and Theo Zwierski.

== Synopsis ==
Otto Friedrich Dennert, a veteran of the Essen police force, is known as "The Grabber" for his unconventional methods. While investigating a series of killings of women, he reaches retirement age. The case is taken over by a new team, including Dennert's son Harry. Convinced that they have arrested the wrong person, Dennert begins investigating by himself with assistance from the criminal underworld.

== Cast ==
- Hans Albers as Otto Friedrich Dennert
- Hansjörg Felmy as Harry Dennert
- Susanne Cramer as Ursula Brandt
- Ernst Stankovski as Willy Goede
- Werner Peters as Mücke
- Mady Rahl as Toni
- Baerbel Wycisk as Evchen
- Horst Frank as Josef Schmitz
- Agnes Windeck as Mutter Schmitz
- Siegfried Lowitz as Dr. Schreiber
- Fritz Wagner as Emil
- Reinhard Kolldehoff as Willy
- Karl Hellmer as Karl Mertens
- Herbert Hübner as Polizeipräsident
- Lia Eibenschütz as Frau Mertens
- Panos Papadopulos as Heini - der Taschendieb
- Joachim Röcker as Tankwart

== Bibliography ==
- Hake, Sabine. Popular Cinema of the Third Reich. University of Texas Press, 2001.
