= When She Starts, Look Out (1958 film) =

1958 film

- Directed by: Géza von Cziffra
- Written by: Géza von Cziffra
- Produced by: Artur Brauner; Horst Wendlandt
- Starring: Peter Alexander; Bibi Johns; Ruth Stephan
- Cinematography: Willi Sohm; Fritz Arno Wagner
- Edited by: Jutta Hering
- Music by: Heinz Gietz
- Production company: CCC Film
- Distributed by: Constantin Film
- Release date: 2 October 1958
- Running time: 80 minutes
- Country: West Germany
- Language: German

When She Starts, Look Out (German: Wehe wenn sie losgelassen...) is a 1958 West German musical comedy film directed by Géza von Cziffra and starring Peter Alexander, Bibi Johns, and Ruth Stephan.

The film's sets were designed by the art director Emil Hasler and Paul Markwitz. It was shot at the Spandau Studios in Berlin and on location in Bavaria.

The plot was based on the Russian fim Jolly Fellows (1934), and that was this film's working title (German: Lustige Gesellen). The German title is a quote, line 163, from Schiller's poem Song of the Bell where it refers to nature's destructive forces ("Woe! when it, from bondage freed"), unrelated to the film's plot.

== Cast ==
- Peter Alexander as Peter Holunder
- Bibi Johns as Dagmar Thomas
- Ruth Stephan as Christa Knax
- Brigitte Mira as Frau Knax
- Joseph Egger as Onkel Tobias
- Gerold Wanke as Willi
- Peter Garden as Oskar
- Hans von Borsody as Jupp
- Lucie Englisch as Innkeeper of the 'Red Ox'
- Helga Martin as Niece Rosl

== Bibliography ==
- Elsaesser, Thomas; Wedel, Michael, eds. (1999). The BFI Companion to German Cinema. London: British Film Institute. ISBN 978-0-85170-750-1.
