= Susanne Cramer =

German actress (1936–1969)

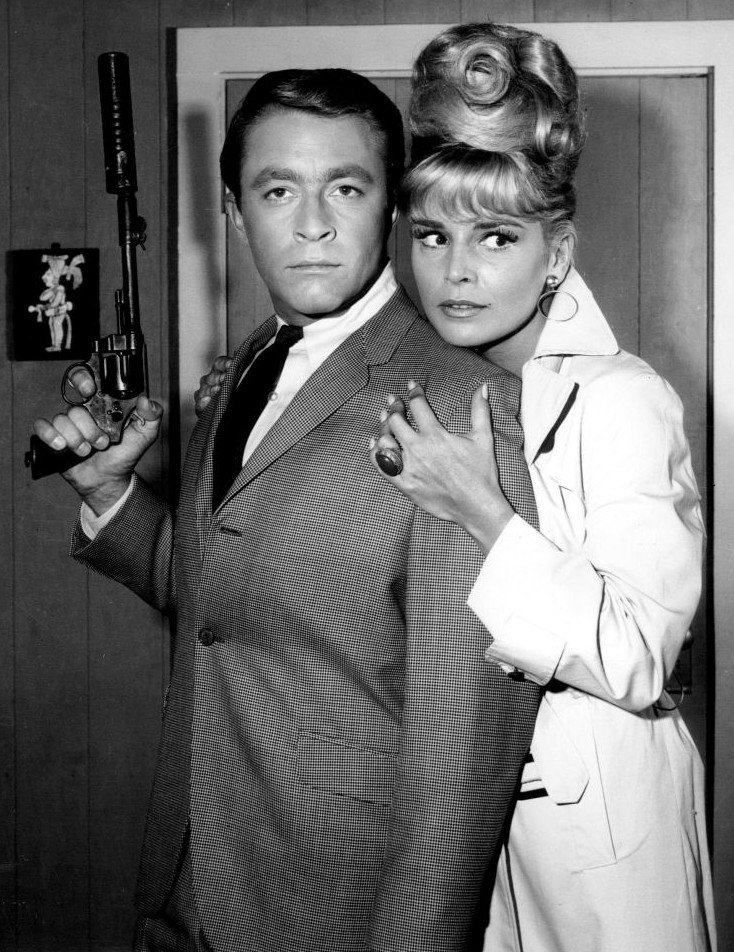
- Cramer with Bill Bixby in My Favorite Martian (1965)
- Born: 3 December 1936; Frankfurt am Main, Germany
- Died: 7 January 1969 (aged 32); Hollywood, California, U.S.
- Resting place: Forest Lawn Memorial Park (Hollywood Hills)
- Occupation: Actress
- Years active: 1956–1969
- Spouses: Hermann Nehlsen (m. 1956; div. 1957); Helmuth Lohner (m. 1957; div. 1958); Allan A. Buckhantz (m. 1961); Kevin Hagen (m. 1967)
- Children: 1

Susanne Cramer (3 December 1936 – 7 January 1969) was a German film and television actress. She was born in Frankfurt, Germany, and died in Hollywood, California, of pneumonia, at age 32.

== Biography ==
At the age of 20, Cramer married the 37-year-old actor Hermann Nehlsen, who pushed her film ambitions. The marriage failed and the actress entered into a relationship with Claus Biederstaedt, whom she had met in 1956 while filming the literary adaptation Kleines Zelt und große Liebe. This relationship also failed; in February 1958, the Frankfurter Abendpost reported that the then 21-year-old actress had attempted suicide, which she denied.

Cramer had a six-year career in American television, starting with a 1963 episode of The Dakotas, and ending with a 1969 episode of The Guns of Will Sonnett.

In between, she was in 24 other television roles. Among them were two appearances on The Rogues in 1964, two appearances on the Kraft Suspense Theater in 1965, two appearances on Burke's Law in 1964–65, one appearance on My Favorite Martian in 1965, one appearance on The Rat Patrol in 1967 and two appearances on The Man from U.N.C.L.E..

She also made appearances in 1964 and 1965 on two episodes of Perry Mason: "The Case of a Place Called Midnight" and as Gerta Palmer in "The Case of the Fugitive Fraulein".

Her sole appearance in a US film (barring an uncredited bit part in Dear Brigitte) was a small role in Bedtime Story, which starred Marlon Brando and David Niven.

Susanne Cramer fell ill two years later with Hong Kong flu, which was rampant in the U.S., and died at the age of just 32 in a private clinic — officially due to pneumonia. However, there are numerous rumors about her death, ranging from suicide to a medical malpractice. Her grave is located at Forest Lawn Memorial Park (Hollywood Hills).

== Filmography ==
Film
Year	Title	Role	Notes
1956	Winter in the Woods	Inge Sternitzke	
1956	The Stolen Trousers	Edith Martens	
1956	Les Assassins du dimanche	Gerda Brüchner	
1956	Kleines Zelt und große Liebe	Karin Faber	
1957	Rot ist die Liebe	Annemieken	
1957	The Night of the Storm	Gina	
1957	Kindermädchen für Papa gesucht	Sabine Friedberg	
1957	Das Glück liegt auf der Straße	Elfie	
1957	Widower with Five Daughters	Karin Scherzer	
1957	The Daring Swimmer	Gaby Marshall	
1957	Holiday Island	Antonietta	
1958	Voyage to Italy, Complete with Love	Ilse Knopf	
1958	The Copper	Ursula Brandt	
1958	Der lachende Vagabund	Pia Hollebusch	
1958	Schwarze Nylons – Heiße Nächte	Karin	
1959	Nick Knatterton’s Adventure	Gloria Nylon	
1960	Yo quiero vivir contigo	Laura	
1960	Mal drunter – mal drüber	Mary	
1961	Three Men in a Boat	Betje Ackerboom	
1961	Blind Justice	Helga Dahms	
1964	Bedtime Story	Anna	
1965	Dear Brigitte	Blonde Doll (Upjohn's Girl)	Uncredited
Television
Year	Title	Role	Notes
1963	The Dakotas	Maria Hoenig	1 episode
1965	Bonanza	Hilda Brunner	Episode: "Dead and Gone"
1964–1965	Burke's Law	Elsa Werner / Cindy	2 episodes
1964–1965	Perry Mason	Gerta Palmer / Greta Koning	2 episodes
1964–1967	The Man from U.N.C.L.E.	"Mr. Smith" / Helga Deniken	2 episodes
1965	My Favorite Martian	Kitty	1 episode
1965	Get Smart	Tanya	1 episode
1966	Hogan's Heroes	Eva	1 episode
1966	Jericho	Marlene	1 episode
1967	Ironside	Tina Masson	1 episode
1967	The Rat Patrol	Gerta	1 episode
1968	Death Valley Days	Britta Olaffson	1 episode
1969	The Guns of Will Sonnett	Christine Anderson	1 episode, (final appearance)
