= It Happened Only Once =

1958 film directed by Géza von Bolváry

- Film poster
- German: Das gab's nur einmal
- Directed by: Géza von Bolváry
- Written by: Gustav Kampendonk
- Produced by: Kurt Ulrich
- Starring: Hans Albers; Helga Martin; Stanislav Ledinek; Emmy Burg
- Cinematography: Bruno Timm
- Edited by: Wolfgang Wehrum
- Music by: Hans-Martin Majewski
- Production company: Kurt Ulrich Film
- Distributed by: UFA
- Release date: 7 March 1958
- Running time: 105 minutes
- Country: West Germany
- Language: German

It Happened Only Once (German: Das gab's nur einmal) is a 1958 West German drama film directed by Géza von Bolváry and starring Hans Albers, Helga Martin, and Stanislav Ledinek. It was shot at the Tempelhof Studios in West Berlin.

== Synopsis ==
A veteran star recounts the history of the film industry to an aspiring young actress, showing a compilation of clips from a variety of German films, many of them featuring Albers himself.

== Cast ==
- Hans Albers as himself, Hans Albers
- Helga Martin as Sabine
- Stanislav Ledinek as Sabine's father
- Emmy Burg as Sabine's mother
- Karl Hellmer as Barber
- Walter Ambrock as Jürgen
- Erich Dunskus as Truck Driver
- Georg Gütlich as Production Manager
- Waltraut Runze as Secretary
- Gerda Mallwitz as Secretary
- Wolf Harnisch as Kellner in der Filmkantine
- Eve Dietrich as Gerti
- Alexa von Porembsky as Mutter Schröder
- Antonie Jaeckel as Alte Komparsin
