= Night Nurse Ingeborg =

1958 film

- Directed by: Géza von Cziffra
- Written by: Michael Daalen (novel); Géza von Cziffra
- Produced by: Otto Meissner
- Starring: Ewald Balser; Claus Biederstaedt; Immy Schell
- Cinematography: Friedl Behn-Grund; Georg Bruckbauer
- Edited by: Martha Dübber
- Music by: Siegfried Franz
- Production company: Deutsche Film Hansa
- Distributed by: Deutsche Film Hansa
- Release date: 3 April 1958
- Running time: 97 minutes
- Country: West Germany
- Language: German

Night Nurse Ingeborg (German: Nachtschwester Ingeborg) is a 1958 West German drama film directed by Géza von Cziffra and starring Ewald Balser, Claus Biederstaedt and Immy Schell.

The film's sets were designed by the art directors Dieter Bartels and Johannes Ott.

== Premise ==
Ingeborg works at a hospital under Professor Burger and his son the surgeon Manfred Burger. What starts as a professional association takes a complicated turn when she has an affair with both father and son, which leads to her losing her job, though she is pregnant.

== Cast ==
- Ewald Balser as Prof. Burger
- Claus Biederstaedt as Dr. Manfred Burger
- Immy Schell as Ingeborg Roeder
- Camilla Spira as Frau Roeder
- Ilse Steppat as Frau Burger
- Franz Schafheitlin as Oberarzt Dr. Ranzau
- Franziska Kinz as Oberschwester Mathilde
- Renate Küster as Schwester Gerti
- Bruno Dallansky as Dr. Hans Markwitz
- Gudrun Thielemann as Schwester Erna
- Bum Krüger as Patient Breitmeier
- Robert Meyn
- Renate Kalin as Schwester Anna
- Erik Frey as Dozent Birkel
- Karl Meixner as Patient Krause
- Max Walter Sieg as Patient Bienert
- Horst Beck
- Gerhard Niemitz

== Bibliography ==
- Rentschler, Eric. The Ministry of Illusion: Nazi Cinema and Its Afterlife. Harvard University Press, 1996.
