= Heinz Erhardt =

German comedian and entertainer

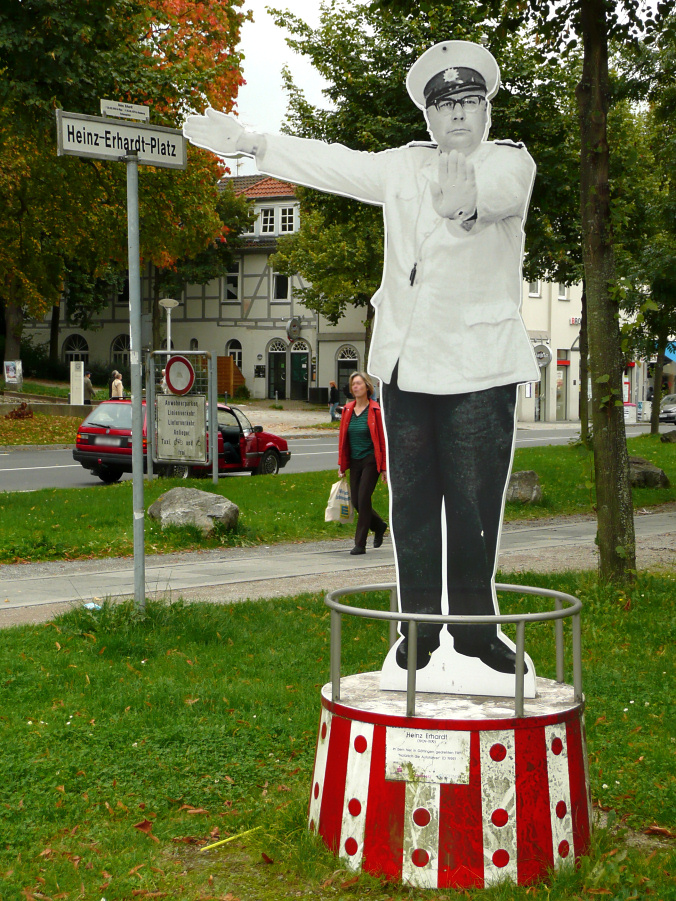
- Heinz Erhardt Stele, 2003, Göttingen
- Born: 20 February 1909; Riga, Governorate of Livonia, Russian Empire
- Died: 5 June 1979 (aged 70); Wellingsbüttel, Hamburg, West Germany
- Resting place: Ohlsdorf Cemetery, Hamburg
- Occupations: Comedian; musician; entertainer; actor; poet
- Years active: –1971
- Spouse: Gilda Zanetti (m. 1935)
- Children: 4
- Website: www.heinzerhardt.de (in German)

Heinz Erhardt (German: [haɪnts ˈeːɐ̯haʁt]; 20 February 1909 – 5 June 1979) was a German comedian, musician, entertainer, actor and poet.

== Life ==
Heinz Erhardt was born in Riga, the son of Baltic German Kapellmeister Gustav Erhardt. He lived most of his childhood at his grandparents in Riga, where his grandfather, Paul Nelder, owned a music supply store at the current location of the Freedom Square. His grandfather also taught him how to play the piano.

After World War I, his father emigrated to Germany. Erhardt lived with his stepmother in Wennigsen near Hanover, where he attended school, until in 1924 he returned to Riga. From 1926 he studied at the Leipzig conservatory; however, Erhardt's wish to become a professional pianist was not supported by his grandparents who wanted him to work as a merchant. In 1935, Erhardt married Gilda Zanetti, daughter of the Italian consul in Saint Petersburg. They had four children: Grit, Verena, Gero and Marita. Gero Erhardt became a film director and cinematographer, and his grandson, Marek Erhardt, became an actor.

Working at his grandfather's business, Erhardt entered the stage as a cabaret artist in several Riga coffeehouses and in 1937 even appeared on the German RRG radio. The next year, Erhardt moved to Berlin, where he performed on a Kabarett stage on Kurfürstendamm. In 1939, he made his first TV appearance with his swing song Mein Mädchen in the film Bunte Fernseh-Fibel. The spectacle wearer and non-swimmer Erhardt was drafted into the German Kriegsmarine navy during World War II, but only on the third call-up; he served as a pianist in the Marine orchestra and only handled weapons during his basic training.

In 1948, he started work as a radio presenter at the public NWDR radio station. By then he had moved to Wellingsbüttel, a quarter of Hamburg. He quickly became extremely popular and famous for his irresistible puns and countless nonsense poems. He also acted in films and on stage. In his films he usually played characters similar to his stage persona as an entertainer and comedian – impersonating polite, uptight characters with a tendency to slips of the tongue and uncontrolled outbursts, exposing the bigotry and insincerity of West Germany's post-war society. By the 1960s, he had become a household name. Still today, many family gatherings which include the older generation tend to end in spontaneous recitations of Erhardt's most famous pieces such as Die Made.

Erhardt suffered a stroke in December 1971, which left him unable to speak or write. He was limited to reading and understanding the speech of others; these limitations ended his long career as an actor.

As a belated 70th birthday gift, he was awarded the Commander's Cross of the Order of Merit of the Federal Republic of Germany four days before his death in 1979.

== Selected filmography ==
- Search for Majora (1949)
- Love on Ice (1950)
- Three Days Confined to Barracks (1955)
- The Stolen Trousers (1956)
- Tired Theodore (1957)
- Widower with Five Daughters (1957)
- Immer die Radfahrer (1958)
- So ein Millionär hat's schwer (1958)
- Father, Mother and Nine Children (1958)
- The Domestic Tyrant (1959)
- Of Course, the Motorists (1959)
- Triplets on Board (1959)
- The Last Pedestrian (1960)
- My Husband, the Economic Miracle (1961)
- Kauf dir einen bunten Luftballon (1961)
- Three Men in a Boat (1961)
- Freddy and the Millionaire (1961)
- Axel Munthe, The Doctor of San Michele (1962)
- Apartmentzauber (1963)
- The Great Skate (1964)
- If You Go Swimming in Tenerife (1964)
- Legacy of the Incas (1965)
- The Oil Prince (1965)
- Charley's Uncle (1969)
- Why Did I Ever Say Yes Twice? (1969)
- Gentlemen in White Vests (1970)
- What Is the Matter with Willi? (1970)
- That Can't Shake Our Willi! (1970)
- Our Willi Is the Best (1971)
- Willi Manages The Whole Thing (1972)
- Noch ’ne Oper (1979, TV film)

== Sources ==
- Bock, Hans-Michael; Bergfelder, Tim, eds. (2009). "Heinz Erhardt". The Concise CineGraph: Encyclopaedia of German Cinema. New York; Oxford: Berghahn Books. pp. 113–114. ISBN 978-1-57181-655-9.
