= Bibi Johns =

Swedish singer and actress

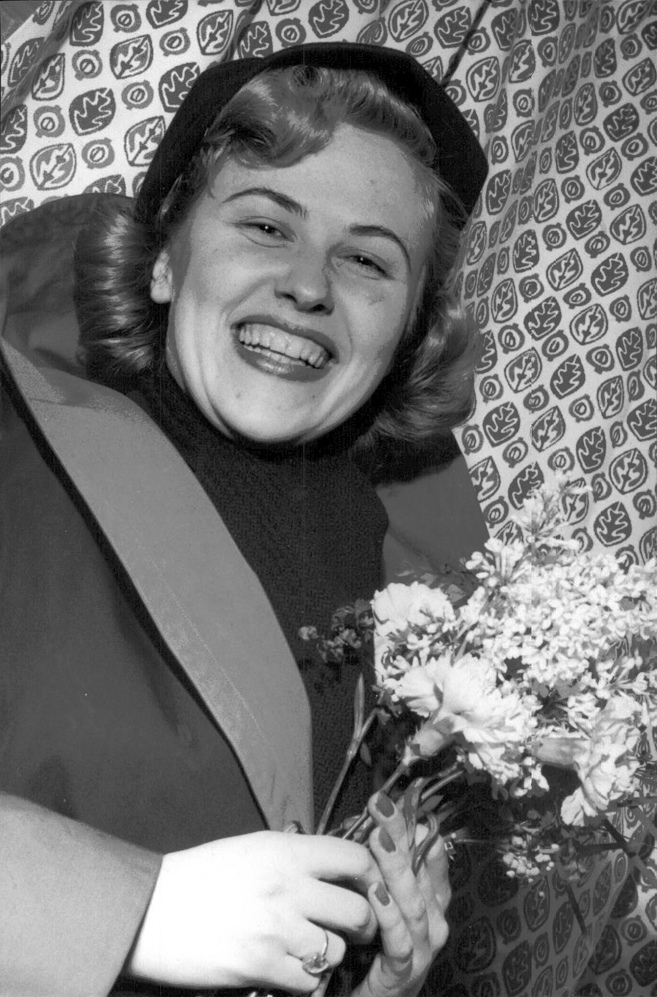
- Johns in 1951
- Born: Gun Birgit Jonsson; 21 January 1929 (age 97); Arboga, Sweden
- Occupations: Actress; singer
- Years active: 1955–present (film & TV)

Bibi Johns (born 21 January 1929) is a Swedish singer and film actress active in Germany.

== Filmography ==
- Ten on Every Finger (1954)
- How Do I Become a Film Star? (1955)
- Ball at the Savoy (1955)
- A Thousand Melodies (1956)
- Beneath the Palms on the Blue Sea (1957)
- When She Starts, Look Out (1958)
- La Paloma (1959)
- Adieu, Lebewohl, Goodbye (1961)

== Bibliography ==
- Lutz Peter Koepnick. The Cosmopolitan Screen: German Cinema and the Global Imaginary, 1945 to the Present. University of Michigan Press, 2007.
