= Willy Winterstein =

Austrian cinematographer

- Born: 22 February 1895; Leitmeritz, Bohemia, Austro-Hungarian Empire
- Died: 4 July 1965 (aged 70); Handeloh, Lower Saxony, West Germany
- Other name: Wilhelm Moritz Winterstein
- Occupation: Cinematographer
- Years active: 1916–1965 (film)

Willy Winterstein (1895–1965) was an Austrian cinematographer.

== Selected filmography ==
- The Marquis of Bolibar (1922)
- The Daughter of the Brigadier (1922)
- The Harbour Bride (1927)
- Almenrausch and Edelweiss (1928)
- The Harbour Baron (1928)
- The Call of the North (1929)
- The Man Without Love (1929)
- Josef the Chaste (1930)
- Twice Married (1930)
- Pension Schöller (1930)
- The Spanish Fly (1931)
- The Unknown Guest (1931)
- The Emperor's Sweetheart (1931)
- A Crafty Youth (1931)
- The Schlemihl (1931)
- The Magic Top Hat (1932)
- The Judas of Tyrol (1933)
- There Is Only One Love (1933)
- Roses from the South (1934)
- Miss Madame (1934)
- Hearts are Trumps (1934)
- At the Strasbourg (1934)
- Miss Liselott (1934)
- A Night on the Danube (1935)
- The Schimeck Family (1935)
- The Girl from the Marsh Croft (1935)
- She and the Three (1935)
- The Blue Mouse (1936)
- The Bashful Casanova (1936)
- A Girl from the Chorus (1937)
- The Hound of the Baskervilles (1937)
- Rubber (1938)
- Kitty and the World Conference (1939)
- Renate in the Quartet (1939)
- The Green Emperor (1939)
- Opera Ball (1939)
- Woman Without a Past (1939)
- Vienna Tales (1940)
- Roses in Tyrol (1940)
- Thrice Wed (1941)
- I Entrust My Wife to You (1943)
- Sophienlund (1943)
- Circus Renz (1943)
- Die Fledermaus (1946)
- Second Hand Destiny (1949)
- The Last Night (1949)
- Shadows in the Night (1950)
- Gabriela (1950)
- Third from the Right (1950)
- Unknown Sender (1950)
- The Man in Search of Himself (1950)
- Abundance of Life (1950)
- Harbour Melody (1950)
- The Shadow of Herr Monitor (1950)
- You Have to be Beautiful (1951)
- Woe to Him Who Loves (1951)
- The Dubarry (1951)
- When the Heath Dreams at Night (1952)
- I Can't Marry Them All (1952)
- The Thief of Bagdad (1952)
- Holiday From Myself (1952)
- The Bird Seller (1953)
- Prosecutor Corda (1953)
- The Flower of Hawaii (1953)
- Money from the Air (1954)
- Three from Variety (1954)
- Love is Forever (1954)
- The Priest from Kirchfeld (1955)
- The Star of Rio (1955)
- When the Alpine Roses Bloom (1955)
- Your Life Guards (1955)
- The Spanish Fly (1955)
- The Tour Guide of Lisbon (1956)
- The Stolen Trousers (1956)
- Three Birch Trees on the Heath (1956)
- Tired Theodore (1957)
- The Big Chance (1957)
- At the Green Cockatoo by Night (1957)
- Victor and Victoria (1957)
- Widower with Five Daughters (1957)
- The Blue Moth (1959)
- The Merry War of Captain Pedro (1959)
- The Night Before the Premiere (1959)
- Pension Schöller (1960)
- The Bird Seller (1962)
- The Sweet Life of Count Bobby (1962)

== Bibliography ==
- Wolfgang Jacobsen & Hans Helmut Prinzler. Käutner. Spiess, 1992.
