= Helmut Fischer =

German actor (1926–1997)

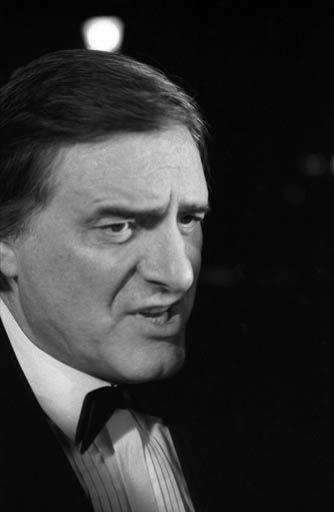
- Fischer in 1991
- Born: 15 November 1926; Munich, Bavaria, Germany
- Died: 14 June 1997 (aged 70); Chiemgau, Bavaria, Germany
- Occupation: Actor

Helmut Fischer (15 November 1926 – 14 June 1997) was a popular, award-winning German actor.

== Life ==
Helmut Fischer was the son of a businessman and a tailor who grew up in the Munich district of Neuhausen at Donnersbergerstraße 50a, where he also went to school. When the secondary school rejected him, he joined Otto Falckenberg's drama school, which he quit after a short time. Subsequently, Fischer worked as a stage actor. In 1952, he debuted at Würzburg city theatre in the role of Albrecht III in Friedrich Hebbel's Agnes Bernauer. The reviews were devastating.

For almost 20 years, Fischer remained largely unknown and was only cast in minor supporting roles. Among other things, he worked at the Zuban show at Munich's Oktoberfest, playing the part of a zebra's behind. In 1953, he married dancer Utta Martin, with whom he lived together up until his death (44 years). 1961 saw the actor's debut in Bavarian Television, as a hairdresser in Ludwig Thomas comedy Die Lokalbahn. Fischer described himself as "terrible" in that role, and said in retrospect: "Richtig g'schämt hab' ich mich, wie überzogen ich damals g'spielt hab (I was terribly ashamed about my totally excessive acting)." Because he wasn't able to pay the bills as an actor, Fischer also worked as a film critic for Munich daily Abendzeitung.

In 1972, he played in a Bavarian Television production of the first episode of the Tatort series, as an assistant to Inspector Veigl (played by Gustl Bayrhammer). When the character of Veigl was "retired" in 1981, Fischer was promoted to Commissioner Ludwig Lenz, and until 1987 solved a total of seven cases. In 1974, while hanging out in his favorite café Münchner Freiheit, Fischer met director Helmut Dietl. The latter quickly recognized his talent, and in 1979 cast him in a major role in the TV series Der ganz normale Wahnsinn, in which Fischer, for the first time, got to play the role of an easy-going playboy.

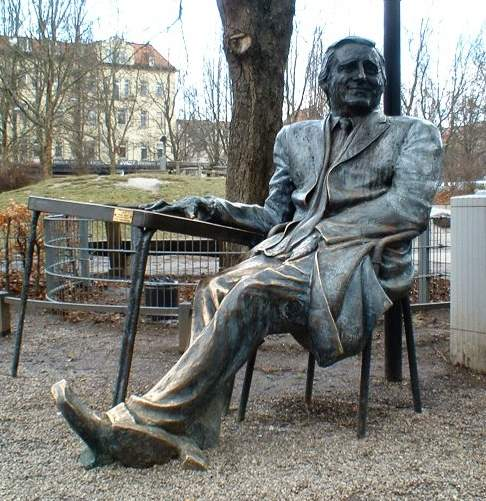
Memorial for "Monaco Franze" (Helmut Fischer) at Münchner Freiheit

Fischer's final breakthrough as a television actor came in 1983 when Dietl cast him as the lead in the series Monaco Franze – Der ewige Stenz. Together with Dietl, author Patrick Süskind co-wrote the scripts for almost all of the show's ten episodes. In the series, which has now reached cult status, Fischer alongside Ruth Maria Kubitschek, Christine Kaufmann, Karl Obermayr and Erni Singerl played an easy-going dandy, charmer and ladies' men, who always manages to wiggle his way out of awkward situations with his trademark sheepish smile. Famous quotes by the character ("A bisserl was geht immer") became popular quickly, to the point where they found their way into the everyday use of Germans. At the time, Fischer also recorded a successful record titled "Spatzl (Schau wia i schau)) (Sweetheart (Look like I'm looking))."

Following the show's success, the actor kept busy with roles whose properties were reliably based on the Stenz cliché, even though until the end of his life Fischer kept reassuring the public that the figure of Monaco Franze had nothing in common with his personal life. In the mid-1980s, Fischer played with Thomas Gottschalk and Michael Winslow in the Three Crazy Jerks movies. Between 1987 and 1992, he appeared on the screen as "Josefbärli", along with Veronika Fitz, and with Ilse Neubauer in the series Die Hausmeisterin (The House Keeper). Fischer enjoyed his last success in the series Ein Schloß am Wörthersee (A castle on the Wörthersee), in which he played the absent-minded real estate manager Leo Laxeneder, and the fictitious mayor of Hohenwaldau, Peter Elfinger in Peter and Paul, alongside Hans Clarin.

In 1993, Helmut Fischer was diagnosed with cancer; at the time, only his wife Utta knew about it. In 1996, the actor underwent treatment by controversial cancer specialist Julius Hackethal. In November of the same year, he celebrated his 70th birthday with a number of friends and colleagues. At the occasion, he told the press: "Das Leben macht sich ja mehr und mehr aus dem Staub (Life is increasingly buzzing off)." Eight months later, Fischer died in Chiemgau. On 19 June 1997, more than 1,000 people participated in his funeral service at the mortuary of Munich's northern cemetery, and the subsequent funeral at Bogenhausen cemetery (gravesite no. 2-4-2). In his funeral speech, Munich's Lord Mayor Christian Ude, a personal friend, and long-time neighbor of Fischer, said: "... Populär war er in ganz Deutschland - in München wurde er geliebt. (He was well-liked all over Germany - in Munich, he was loved.)"

Two years after his death, a bronze monument of Fischer, commissioned by Munich's municipal government, and done by sculptor Nicolai Tregor Jr. was revealed. It is located at the actor's former favorite spot in the garden of café Münchner Freiheit in the Schwabing district.

== Filmography ==
- 1958: Cherchez la femme (Curse the Women); with Helen Vita
- 1959: Hunting Party; with Angelika Meissner and Wolf Albach-Retty
- 1960: Oh! This Bavaria!; with Liesl Karlstadt and Ludwig Schmid-Wildy
- 1960: Die vor die Hunde gehen (Those Who go to the Dogs)
- 1962: Florence und der Zahnarzt (Florence and the Dentist)
- 1967: Der Röhm-Putsch (Night of the Long Knives); with Hans Korte and Gustl Bayrhammer
- 1978: Sachrang; with Gustl Bayrhammer
- 1978: The Unicorn
- 1978: Derrick - Season 05, Episode 04: "Ein Hinterhalt"
- 1979: Blauer Himmel, den ich nur ahne (Blue Heavens which I can but sense); with Jörg Hube and Hans Stadtmüller
- 1979: It Can Only Get Worse; Director: Helmut Dietl
- 1980: The Ungrateful
- 1984: Mama Mia – Don't Panic; with Uschi Glas and Thomas Gottschalk
- 1987: A Slip of the Disc (Hexenschuß); with Susanne Uhlen, Herbert Herrmann, Hans Clarin and Beppo Brem
- 1987: Three Crazy Jerks; with Thomas Gottschalk and Michael Winslow
- 1988: Starke Zeiten (Hard Times); with Karl Dall, Hans-Joachim Kulenkampff and David Hasselhoff
- 1988: Three Crazy Jerks II; with Thomas Gottschalk und Michael Winslow
- 1989: Jede Menge Schmidt (Lots of Schmidt); with Anja Schüte
- 1992: Der Unschuldsengel (Innocent as an Angel); with Hans Clarin and Iris Berben
- 1993: Probefahrt ins Paradies (Test Run to Paradise)
- 1995: Drei in fremden Kissen (Three in Foreign Sheets); with Hans Brenner and Fritz Wepper
- 1996: Drei in fremden Betten (Three in Foreign Beds); with Fritz Wepper and Heidelinde Weis
- 1997: Fröhlich geschieden (Happily Divorced); with Rainhard Fendrich

== TV series ==
- 1962: Funkstreife Isar 12 (Patrol Car Isar 12); with Wilmut Borell and Karl Tischlinger
- 1968: Graf Yoster gibt sich die Ehre: Der goldene Elefant (Count Yoster: The Golden Elephant); with Lukas Ammann and Wolfgang Völz
- 1968: Die seltsamen Methoden des Franz Josef Wanninger: Die Beschützer (The Strange Methods of F. J. Wanninger: The Protectors); TV police series with Beppo Brem
- 1972–1981: Tatort; as Kommissar Veigl's (Gustl Bayrhammer) assistant Ludwig Lenz, with Willy Harlander
  - 1972: Münchner Kindl
  - 1973: Weißblaue Turnschuhe (White and blue Sneakers)
  - 1973: Tote brauchen keine Wohnung (Dead Persons need no Flat)
  - 1974: 3:0 für Veigl (3-0 for Veigl)
  - 1975: Als gestohlen gemeldet (Reported stolen)
  - 1975: Das zweite Geständnis (The second Confession)
  - 1976: Wohnheim Westendstraße (Westendstraße Boarding House)
  - 1977: Das Mädchen am Klavier (The Girl at the Piano)
  - 1977: Schüsse in der Schonzeit (Shots during Closed Season)
  - 1978: Schlußverkauf (Sale-out)
  - 1978: Schwarze Einser (Black Ones)
  - 1979: Ende der Vorstellung (End of the Show)
  - 1979: Maria im Elend (Miserable Maria)
  - 1980: Spiel mit Karten (A Card Game)
  - 1981: Usambaraveilchen (saintpaulias)
- 1981–1987: Tatort; as Hauptkommissar Ludwig Lenz
  - 1981: Im Fadenkreuz (In the Crosshairs)
  - 1982: Tod auf dem Rastplatz (Death on the resting place)
  - 1983: Roulette mit sechs Kugeln (Roulette with six Bullets)
  - 1984: Heißer Schnee (Hot Snow)
  - 1985: Schicki Micki (Fancy)
  - 1987: Die Macht des Schicksals (The Power of Fate)
  - 1987: Gegenspieler (Opponent)
- Tatort series as visiting commissioner in:
  - 1976: Transit ins Jenseits (Transit to the Afterlife)
  - 1977: Wer andern eine Grube gräbt (Harm set, Harm get)
  - 1979: Der King (The King)
  - 1987: Wunschlos tot (Perfectly Dead)
- 1972: Gestern gelesen (Read Yesterday)
- 1978: Derrick - Ein Hinterhalt (An Ambush); TV police series with Horst Tappert and Fritz Wepper
- 1979 and 1986/1987: Der Millionenbauer (The Million Mark Farmer); with Walter Sedlmayr and Veronika Fitz
- 1979: Fast wia im richtigen Leben (Almost like Real Life); with Gerhard Polt
- 1979: Der ganz normale Wahnsinn (The Ordinary Madness)
- 1982: Meister Eder und sein Pumuckl - Die abergläubische Putzfrau (The Superstitious Cleaner); Children's series
- 1983: Krimistunde (Thriller Time)
- 1983: Monaco Franze – Der ewige Stenz; with Ruth Maria Kubitschek
- 1983: Unsere schönsten Jahre (Our best Years); with Uschi Glas and Elmar Wepper
- 1986: Das Traumschiff (The Dreamliner); guest role
- 1986: Rette mich, wer kann (Save Me who Can!); with Gundi Ellert
- 1987–1992: Die Hausmeisterin (The House Keeper); with Veronika Fitz
- 1992: Lilli Lottofee (roughly: Lilli the Lottery Game Fairy); with Senta Berger
- 1992–1993: Ein Schloß am Wörthersee (A Castle on Wörthersee); with Uschi Glas
- 1993–1994: Peter und Paul (Peter and Paul); series with Hans Clarin
- 1996: Wir Königskinder; with Fritz Wepper

== Stage plays ==
- 1952: Agnes Bernauer - at the Würzburg city theatre
- 1953: Diener zweier Herren (Servant of Two Masters) - am Stadttheater Würzburg
- 1964: Die großen Sebastians (The Great Sebastians) - at the Kleine Komödie in Munich
- 1966: Italienische Nacht (Italian Night) - at Residenz Theatre
- 1969–1970: Jagdszenen aus Niederbayern (Hunting Scenes from Lower Bavaria) - Münchner Kammerspiele
- 1975: Fast wie ein Poet (Almost like A Poet) - at Residenz Theatre - Director: Rudolf Noelte
- 1984–1985: Waldfrieden (Peace in the Woods) - Münchner Volkstheater
- 1984–1985: Die Brautschau (Looking for a Wife) - am Münchner Volkstheater mit Hans Brenner

== Awards ==
- 1983 – Goldener Gong for "Monaco Franze", together with Ruth Maria Kubitschek and Helmut Dietl
- 1983 – "Rose des Jahres (Rose of the Year)" by tz (Munich tabloid)
- 1983 – "Stern des Jahres (Star of the Year)" by Münchner Abendzeitung
- 1987 – "Bambi"
- 1990 – "Bambi"
- 1990 – Adolf Grimme Awards for Die Hausmeisterin, together with Veronika Fitz and Cornelia Zaglmann-Willinger (author)
- 1991 – "München leuchtet" medal (for merits on Munich)
- 1992 – Siegfried Sommer Literary Awards
- 1993 – Golden Romy for "Most popular actor"
- 1997 – Bronze monument by Nicolai Tregor in Munich Schwabing
- – "Krenkl-Preis" by the Munich Social Democrats for moral courage and civil engagement
- – The Helmut-Fischer-Platz (Helmut Fischer Square) in Munich's Schwabing-West was named after him

== Bibliography ==
- Fischer, Helmut (1997), A bissl was geht immer, ISBN 3-7654-2887-6
- Helmut Fischer - Der unsterbliche Stenz - Erinnerungen von seinen Freunden (Helmut Fischer - the immortal Stenz - Memories of his Friends) (2006), ISBN 3-7844-3058-9
