= Franz Geiger =

German screenwriter

- Born: 3 April 1921; Munich, Bavaria, Germany
- Died: 1 June 2011 (aged 80); Mallorca, Spain
- Occupation: Writer
- Years active: 1952-2003 (film & TV)

Franz Geiger (1921–2011) was a German screenwriter of film and television.

== Selected filmography ==
- Oh, You Dear Fridolin (dir. Peter Hamel, 1952)
- School for Marriage (1954) — based on The Art of Being Happily Married by André Maurois
- Lola Montès (dir. Max Ophüls, 1955) — based on a novel by Cécil Saint-Laurent
- My Ninety Nine Brides (dir. Alfred Vohrer, 1958) — based on a novel by Sigi Sommer
- Agatha, Stop That Murdering! (dir. Dietrich Haugk, 1960)
- Bankraub in der Rue Latour (dir. Curd Jürgens, 1961)
- Father Brown (1966–1972, TV series)
- Angel Baby (dir. Marran Gosov, 1968)
- Up the Establishment (dir. Michael Verhoeven, 1969)
- Der kleine Doktor (1974, TV series)
- Münchner Geschichten (1974–1975, TV series)
- Polizeiinspektion 1 (1977–1983, TV series)
- Der Millionenbauer (dir. Georg Tressler, 1979, TV series)
- Der ganz normale Wahnsinn (dir. Helmut Dietl, 1979, TV series)
- Unsere schönsten Jahre (1983, TV series)
- Monaco Franze (dir. Helmut Dietl, 1983, TV series)
- Rette mich, wer kann (dir. Franz Geiger, 1986, TV series)
- Der elegante Hund (dir. Franz Geiger, 1987–1988, TV series)

== Bibliography ==
- Georges Sadoul. Dictionary of Films. University of California Press, 1972.
