= Christine Kaufmann =

German-Austrian actress (1945–2017)

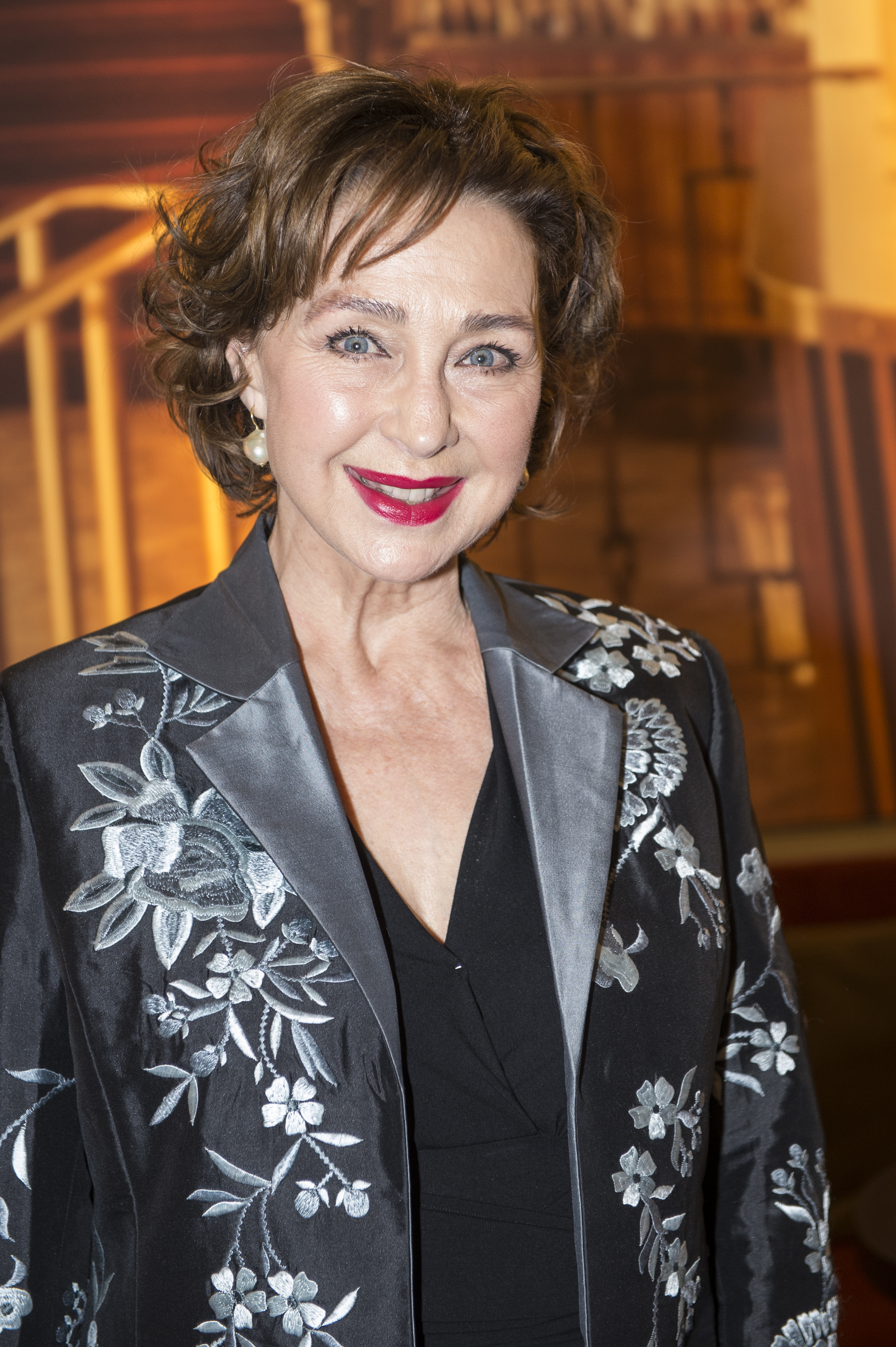
- Kaufmann in 2014
- Born: Christine Maria Kaufmann; 11 January 1945; Lengdorf, Reichsgau Steiermark, Germany
- Died: 28 March 2017 (aged 72); Munich, Bavaria, Germany
- Occupations: Actress, author, businesswoman
- Years active: 1952–2017
- Spouses: Tony Curtis (m. 1963; div. 1968) Achim Lenz (m. 1974; div. 1976) Reno Eckstein (m. 1979; div. 1982) Klaus Zey (m. 1997; div. 2011)
- Children: 2, including Allegra Curtis

Christine Maria Kaufmann (German: [kʁɪsˈtiːnə maˈʁiːa ˈkaʊfman]; 11 January 1945 – 28 March 2017) was a German-Austrian actress, author, and businesswoman. The daughter of a German father and a French mother, she won the Golden Globe Award for New Star of the Year – Actress for Town Without Pity in 1961, the first German to be honoured.

== Life and career ==
Kaufmann was born in Lengdorf, Styria, Austria (then part of Nazi Germany). Her mother, Geneviève Kaufmann (née Gavaert), was a French make-up artist; her father, Johannes Kaufmann, was a German Luftwaffe officer and engineer.

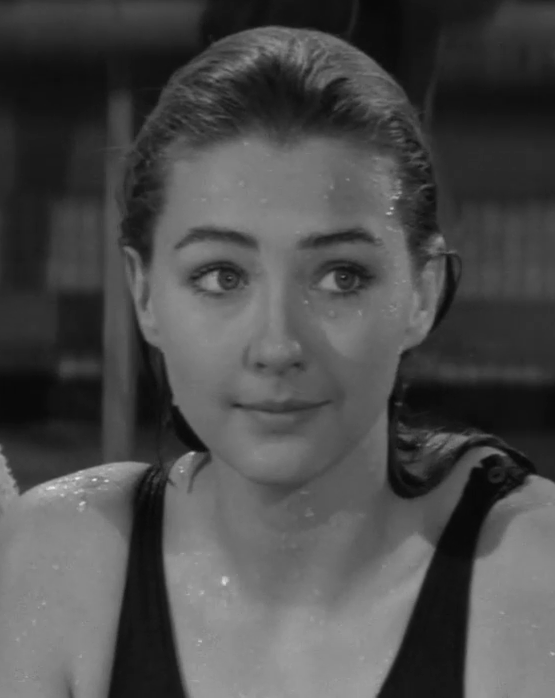
Kaufmann in Toto, Fabrizi and the Young People Today (1960)

Growing up in Munich, Bavaria, Kaufmann became a ballerina at the Munich Opera. She began her film career at the age of seven in The White Horse Inn (1952) and appeared as a lead actress in Der schweigende Engel the same year, but gained big attention with Rose-Girl Resli in 1954. She achieved international recognition when she starred with Steve Reeves in The Last Days of Pompeii (1959) and with Kirk Douglas in Town Without Pity (1961). The following year she appeared in Escape from East Berlin and with future husband Tony Curtis in Taras Bulba.

After her divorce from Curtis, Kaufmann resumed her career which she had interrupted during her marriage. Notable roles included the Werner Fassbinder films Lili Marleen and Lola. She often worked with German director Helmut Dietl, in the satirical television series Monaco Franze. In 1987, she played a glamorous tattoo artist in the cult classic Bagdad Cafe, an offbeat comedy set in a desolate truck stop café and motel in the Mojave Desert. Her last role was Aunt Polly in the American film Tom Sawyer & Huckleberry Finn (2014), co-starring Jake T. Austin and Val Kilmer.

In her later years, Kaufmann was also a successful businesswoman; she promoted her own line of cosmetics products that sold well in Germany. From her 40s until her death, the media often called Kaufmann the "most beautiful grandmother in Germany". She wrote several books about beauty and health, as well as two autobiographies.

== Personal life ==
At age 18 in 1963, Kaufmann married her Taras Bulba co-star Tony Curtis. They had two daughters, Alexandra Theodora Dido Curtis (born 19 July 1964) and Allegra Curtis (born 11 July 1966). The couple divorced in 1968. Kaufmann married three more times: to television director Achim Lenz (1974–76), musician and actor Reno Eckstein (1979–1982) and illustrator Klaus Zey (1997–2011). On German television, Kaufmann admitted to having an affair with Warren Beatty.

Kaufmann enjoyed traveling. She moved from one place to another frequently. She spoke three languages: German, English, and French.

Kaufmann died of leukemia in Munich at age 72 on 28 March 2017, only a few days after she had been diagnosed with the disease.

== Filmography ==
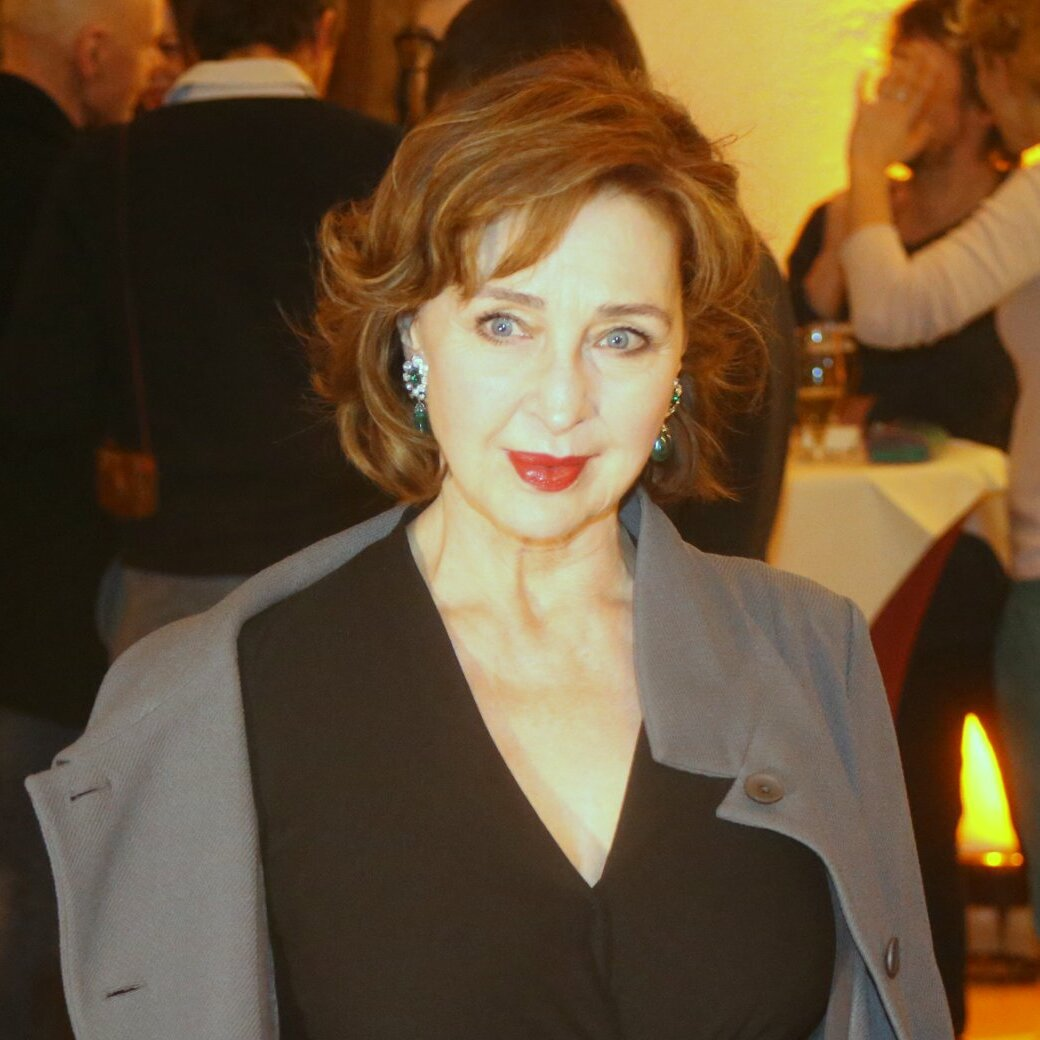
Kaufmann in 2015

=== Film ===
Year	Title	Role	Notes
1952	Im Weißen Rössl		Uncredited
1953	Prosecutor Corda	Berta Neidhart	
1953	Salto Mortale	Dascha	
1953	The Monastery's Hunter	Vronerl	
1954	Rose-Girl Resli	Resli	
1954	The Silent Angel	Angelika Helmer	
1955	When the Alpine Roses Bloom	Christine	
1956	Ein Herz schlägt für Erika	Erika Kayser	
1956	Die Stimme der Sehnsucht	Eva	
1957	The Winemaker of Langenlois	Christl	
1957	Widower with Five Daughters	Ulla Scherzer	
1958	Mädchen in Uniform	Mia	
1958	Die singenden Engel von Tirol	Evi Kramer	
1958	Embezzled Heaven	Doris	
1959	First Love	Silvia	
1959	Everybody Loves Peter	Kitty Steiner	
1959	Winter Holidays	Florence	
1959	The Last Days of Pompeii	Elena / Ione	
1960	The Fabulous Fraud	Christine Wilkens	
1960	Toto, Fabrizi and the Young People Today	Gabriella Cocozza	
1960	Red Lips	Baby	
1960	The Last Pedestrian	Christine Cornelius	
1961	Constantine and the Cross	Livia	
1961	Town Without Pity	Karin Steinhof	
1961	Via Mala	Sylvia Lauretz	
1961	A Man Named Rocca	Geneviève Adé	
1961	The Phony American	Inge	
1962	Swordsman of Siena	Serenella Arconti	
1962	Escape from East Berlin	Erika Jurgens	
1962	Terror After Midnight	Julie Elgin	
1962	Taras Bulba	Natalia Dubrov	
1964	Wild and Wonderful	Giselle Ponchon	
1969	Love Birds	La Contessa	
1971	Murders in the Rue Morgue	Madeleine Charron	
1972	The Death of Maria Malibran		
1973	Willow Springs	Christine	
1974	Goodbye with Mums		
1975	By Hook or by Crook		
1976	As of Tomorrow	Vicky	
1976	Goldflocken		
1978	Red Rings of Fear	Christina	
1979	It Can Only Get Worse	Violetta Schimpf	
1980	Egon Schiele: Excess and Punishment	Edith Harms	
1981	Lili Marleen	Miriam	
1981	Lola	Susi	
1981	Day of the Idiots	Ruth	
1983	Das Gold der Liebe	Patricias Mutter	Uncredited
1983	The Roaring Fifties	Natascha	
1983	Ziemlich weit weg		
1983	The Swing	Mme. Lautenschlag	
1983	Pankow '95	Laura Zart	
1987	Bagdad Cafe	Debby	
1989	The Story Teller	Clara Lilienthal	
1989	Hard to Be a God	Okana	
1994	The Knickerbocker Gang: The Talking Grave	Annie Kramer	
1998	Caipiranha	Karin Wolters	
1998	The Sleeper	Stationsleiterin	
2002	Haider lebt – 1. April 2021	Newssprecherin	
2011	Fahr zur Hölle	Lilith	
2014	Tom Sawyer & Huckleberry Finn	Aunt Polly	(final film role)

=== Television ===
Year	Title	Role	Notes
1970	Bend Sinister	Mariette	TV film
1970	Wie ein Blitz	Diana Valesco	TV miniseries
1971	Gestrickte Spuren	Fanny Elßler	TV film
1972	Der Kommissar	Eva Raßner	"Traum eines Wahnsinnigen"
1973	Immobilien	Jasmin Strothmann	TV film
1974	Die Fälle des Herrn Konstantin	Gisela Pahl	"Der gußeiserne Buddha", "Bankdirektor Alba"
1975	Burning Daylight	Margret 'Labiskwee'	"Vierauge"
1977	Derrick	Marion Kless	"Hals in der Schlinge"
1978	The Singers	Nina Huf	TV film
1979	Le comte de Monte-Cristo	Mme. Danglars	TV miniseries
1979	Joséphine ou la comédie des ambitions	Mme. Hosten-Lamothe	TV miniseries
1979	Der ganz normale Wahnsinn	Violetta Schimpf	"Drittes Kapitel", "Zweites Kapitel", "Sechstes Kapitel"
1982	Wonderful, Wonderful Times	Frau von Pachthofen	TV film
1983	Monaco Franze	Olga Behrens	Main role
1983	Inflation im Paradies	Laverne Schuhmann	TV film
1987	Die Insel	Margit	TV film
1988	Julius Caesar	Portia	TV film
1990–1991	Wenn das die Nachbarn wüßten	Kaufhausdirektorin	TV series
1993	Glückliche Reise	Felicitas von Feilitz	"Ibiza"
1993	Missione d'amore	Valery	TV miniseries
1993	Das Double	Jutta Eck	TV film
1994	Verliebt, verlobt, verheiratet	Maja Kunert	TV series
1994	Birkenhof & Lerchenau	Theres	TV film
1995	Stubbe – Von Fall zu Fall	Frau Jensen	"Stubbe sieht rot"
1995	Weihnachten mit Willy Wuff II – Eine Mama für Lieschen	Gräfin	TV film
1996	Balko	Frederike Kogel	"Ein Toter zuwenig"
1997	Parkhotel Stern	Oksana Olejewa	"Entscheidungen"
1998	A.S.	Nadja Seewald	"Das Tier"
1998	Höllische Nachbarn	Ingelore Merk	TV film
1998	Für alle Fälle Stefanie	Frau von Drossel	"Goldene Regeln"
1999	Einsatz Hamburg Süd	Frau Duenser	"Trau keinem!"
2000	SOKO München	Margit Finneisen	"Das Rendezvous"
2003	Club der Träume – Türkei, Marmaris	Adlaya	TV film
2007	Die ProSieben Märchenstunde	Tante Hortensie	"Aschenputtel – Für eine Handvoll Tauben"
2008	Im Namen des Gesetzes	Frau Meyer-Arndt	"Dunkle Ahnung"
2008	Love Trip Home	Marianne Forster	TV film
2012	Heiter bis tödlich – Fuchs und Gans	Diana Bootz	"Eierdiebe"
2013	Stille	Adele Vio	TV film
2013	Tiere bis unters Dach	Frau von Werther	"Die Millionenkatze"
