= Unsere schönsten Jahre =

- Created by: Franz Geiger
- Starring: Uschi Glas; Elmar Wepper; Helmut Fischer; Veronika Fitz; Monika Baumgartner
- Country of origin: West Germany
- No. of seasons: 2
- No. of episodes: 12

Original release
- Network: ZDF
- Release: 1 September 1983 – 12 October 1985

Unsere schönsten Jahre is a German television series that originally aired from 1983 and 1985.

Set in Munich, the show revolves around Elfi Ortlieb and Raimund Sommer, a newly in love couple.

As Uschi Glas and Elmar Wepper also portray a married couple on Polizeiinspektion 1 and Zwei Münchner in Hamburg, they were considered one of German television's supercouples in the 1980s.

Like previously on the highly successful Monaco Franze and later on Die Hausmeisterin, Helmut Fischer again plays the "suburban womanizer", his signature role.

== See also ==
- List of German television series
