= Father Brown (1966 TV series) =

- Genre: Crime
- Written by: G.K. Chesterton (stories); Franz Geiger
- Directed by: Hans Quest; Imo Moszkowicz; Rainer Wolffhardt
- Starring: Josef Meinrad; Ernst Fritz Fürbringer
- Composers: Hans Hammerschmid; Bert Breit
- Country of origin: West Germany
- Original language: German
- No. of series: 5
- No. of episodes: 39

Production
- Producer: Ulrich Berns
- Running time: 25 minutes
- Production companies: Fernsehfilmproduktion Dr. Heinz Schneiderbauer (seasons 1-2) TV-60 Filmproduktion (seasons 3-5) Westdeutsches Werbefernsehen

Original release
- Network: ARD
- Release: 11 January 1966 – 4 December 1972

Father Brown (German: Pater Brown) is a West German mystery television series which aired between 1966 and 1972 on ARD. It is based on the Father Brown stories of British writer G.K. Chesterton, about a crime-solving Catholic priest. The title role was played by the Austrian actor Josef Meinrad. Ernst Fritz Fürbringer had a recurring role as Inspector Gilbert Burns in 19 episodes, while Guido Wieland played another police officer Inspector Evans in 10 episodes.

The first two series were shot in monochrome, before production then switched to colour.

== Guest cast ==
Actors who appeared in individual episodes of the series include Viktor Staal, Albert Lieven, Astrid Frank, Dieter Borsche, Eckart Dux, Karin Hübner, Wolfgang Lukschy, Christiane Nielsen, Christian Wolff, Alexander Hegarth, Karl John, Diana Körner, Klaus Löwitsch, Ilona Grübel, Joachim Hansen, Michael Hinz, Carl Lange, Werner Pochath, Hans Quest, Claus Biederstaedt, Alexander Kerst, Ruth Maria Kubitschek, Gerd Baltus, Rudolf Schündler, Hans Korte, Peter Capell, Ellen Umlauf, Helma Seitz, Hilde Weissner and Werner Peters.

== Bibliography ==
- Martin Compart. Crime TV: Lexikon der Krimi-Serien. Bertz + Fischer, 2000.
