= Walter Sedlmayr =

German actor (1926–1990)

- Born: 6 January 1926; Munich, Germany
- Died: 14 July 1990 (aged 64); Munich, West Germany
- Other name: Walter Sedlmayer
- Occupation: Actor

Walter Sedlmayr (6 January 1926 – 14 July 1990) was a popular German stage, television, and film actor from Bavaria. His murder in 1990 was widely publicized.

== Career ==
After his 1945 wartime Abitur, Sedlmayr served as a Flakhelfer towards the end of World War II. His acting career began with minor roles with the Münchner Kammerspiele, for which he played more than 25 years, and in numerous Heimatfilme during the 1940s and 1950s.

In 1971, by now an associate of Rainer Werner Fassbinder, Sedlmayr was briefly arrested because a stolen artwork, the Blutenburger Madonna, was found in his house. He was later acquitted of all charges, and the media attention given to his trial helped him gain major roles. His breakthrough came with the leading role in Hans-Jürgen Syberberg's film Theodor Hierneis oder Wie man ehem. Hofkoch wird (1972). Afterwards, Sedlmayr was cast in numerous popular German TV shows, including Münchner Geschichten, Der Herr Kottnik, Der Millionenbauer, and Polizeiinspektion 1; he also frequently appeared on stage and in other media.

== Murder ==
On 14 July 1990, Sedlmayr was found dead in the bedroom of his Munich apartment. He had been tied up, stabbed in the stomach with a knife and beaten about the head with a hammer. The setting of the crime created the impression that Sedlmayr was killed while enganging in gay BDSM activities. The sharp contrast between the actor's very conservative, traditional public persona and his hidden homosexuality created a media sensation. After extensive research among dozens of male sex workers who had had contact with Sedlmayr, it turned out however that the actor hadn't practiced BDSM at all and the setup of the crime scene had been deliberately altered.

On 21 May 1993, two half-brothers, Wolfgang Werlé and Manfred Lauber, former business associates of Sedlmayr, were found guilty of his murder and sentenced to life in prison. The killers were released from prison in 2007 and 2008.

Sedlmayr's life and murder were the subject of the 2001 biopic Wambo by Jo Baier, where he was played by Jürgen Tarrach, and of an episode of the ARD TV series Die großen Kriminalfälle.

In 2009, the two men convicted of the killing took legal action demanding the removal of their names from the German and English language Wikipedia, arguing that it invaded their right to privacy. The names were removed from the German Wikipedia, while the English-speaking Wikipedia community declined to do so, supported by the Wikimedia Foundation, which contested the validity of the ruling as it neither operates nor has assets in Germany. In December 2009, the Federal Court of Justice, the highest court of ordinary jurisdiction in Germany, ruled that the convicted have no right of removal of their names from internet archives as this would interfere too strongly with the right of free speech. After this ruling, the names were again included in the German Wikipedia. In June 2018, the European Court of Human Rights upheld the decision of the Federal Court of Justice to reject the request to ban publication of the killers' names.

== Filmography ==
=== Film ===
- 1949: Die drei Dorfheiligen - Schwälble
- 1951: Heidelberger Romanze
- 1952: Two People - Martin
- 1952: The Crucifix Carver of Ammergau - Muckl
- 1953: The Mill in the Black Forest
- 1953: Marriage Strike
- 1954: The Little Town Will Go to Sleep
- 1954: Rose-Girl Resli - Theo
- 1955: I Know What I'm Living For
- 1955: The Royal Waltz - Konditor Franz
- 1955: Der Frontgockel - Beni Banzinger
- 1955: Three Girls from the Rhine
- 1956: Hilfe - sie liebt mich - Schnecki
- 1956: The Hunter of Fall - Loisl, Wirtssohn
- 1957: Marriages Forbidden - Lois Haflinger
- 1958: Der Pauker - Substitute Teacher
- 1959: The Shepherd from Trutzberg - Eberhard von Trutzberg
- 1959: Dorothea Angermann - Willi
- 1959: People in the Net
- 1959: The Buddenbrooks - Alois Permaneder
- 1960: Ein gewisses Röcheln (director)
- 1964: Bei Tag und Nacht (TV Movie) - Celio
- 1965: Radetzkymarsch (TV Movie) - Rittmeister Taittinger
- 1965: Die fromme Helene - Bauer Knoll
- 1969: Frei bis zum nächsten Mal (TV Movie) - Bürgermeister
- 1969: Der Rückfall (TV Movie)
- 1970: Baal (TV Movie) - Anwalt Pschierer
- 1970: The Niklashausen Journey (TV Movie) - Priest
- 1970: Das Glöcklein unterm Himmelbett - Judge
- 1971: Rio das Mortes (TV Movie) - Sekretär
- 1971: Mathias Kneissl - Polizist
- 1972: The Merchant of Four Seasons - Fruit cart salesman
- 1972: The Morals of Ruth Halbfass - The arms dealer
- 1972: Theodor Hierneis oder Wie man ehem. Hofkoch wird - Theodor Hierneis
- 1972: A Free Woman - Personalchef
- 1973: The Experts (1973)
- 1974: Ali: Fear Eats the Soul - Angermayer
- 1974: Die Ameisen kommen - Kommissar
- 1974: Die Reform (TV Movie)
- 1974: Stolen Heaven - Franz Josef Reyer
- 1975: Das Andechser Gefühl - School director
- 1975: Fox and His Friends - Car dealer
- 1975: Lina Braake - Emil Schoener
- 1975: Cold Blood - Franz Grendel
- 1976: Der verkaufte Großvater (TV Movie) - Haslinger
- 1977: Die Jugendstreiche des Knaben Karl - Vater Fey
- 1979: Anton Sittinger (TV Movie) - Anton Sittinger
- 1981: Mein Freund, der Scheich (TV Movie) - Grindel
- 1984: Rambo Zambo (TV Movie) - Haslinger

=== TV appearances ===
- 1964-1970: Das Kriminalmuseum - Kriminalkommissar Brunnert / Drogist / Ludwig Schmiedl / Bahnwärter / Bahn Herr Renz / Alois Hirsch
- 1969: Der Staudamm - Hering
- 1972: Eight Hours Don't Make a Day - Witwer
- 1972-1973: Tatort - Pröpper / Dünnkitz
- 1973: Drei Partner - Herr Kottnick
- 1973: World on a Wire - Janitor
- 1973-1975: Der Kommissar - Alfons Tolke / U-Bahn-Kontrolleur / Bürgermeister / Polizist
- 1974: Der Herr Kottnik - Alfred Kottnik
- 1974-1975: Derrick - Koch / Herr Huber
- 1975: Münchner Geschichten - Erster Polizist
- 1975-1976: Spannagl & Sohn - Gustav Spannagl
- 1976: Alle Jahre wieder – Die Familie Semmeling - Wiesner / Reiseleiter Wiesner
- 1976-1980: Vater Seidl und sein Sohn - Vater Ludwig Seidl
- 1976-1982: Reisen mit Walter Sedlmayr
- 1977-1988: Polizeiinspektion 1 - Franz Josef Schöninger / Hans W. Hübner
- 1978-1980: Der Alte - Herbert Smolka / Ziesenhut
- 1979-1988: Der Millionenbauer - Josef Hartinger
- 1983: Monaco Franze - Dr. Felix Hallerstein
- 1983-1985: Unsere schönsten Jahre - Seidl
- 1986-1988: Der Schwammerlkönig - Dädy Schwaiger

== Award ==
In 1973, Sedlmayr won the Outstanding Individual Achievement: Actor Deutscher Filmpreis award for his role in Theodor Hierneis oder Wie man ehemaliger Hofkoch wird.

In June 2000, the Walter-Sedlmayr-Platz was named after him.
