= Anton Sittinger =

1937 novel by Oskar Maria Graf

Anton Sittinger is a satirical novel by Oskar Maria Graf, first published in 1937 by the German publisher-in-exile Malik-Verlag in London.

The novel was filmed for TV in 1979 by Rainer Wolffhardt for Bayerischer Rundfunk with Walter Sedlmayr in the title role.

In 2024 the first English language translation of the novel appeared, translated by Ed Walker.

== Plot ==
Anton Sittinger is a petty-bourgeois postal inspector in Munich. He reads only "the most serious philosophers with absolute substance" such as Schopenhauer but considers himself apolitical. By contrast his wife Malwine, her brother Herbert, and her attractive sister-in-law Anna are all strongly attracted to the "national" movement.

Following the struggles of the Bavarian Soviet Republic in 1919 and the Hitler Putsch of 1923, Anton takes early retirement and the Sittingers flee to the countryside, where the locals give them the cold shoulder.

Sittinger protects himself from complete ruin during the hyperinflation by converting his money into gold coins and then into dollars, against the advice of Herbert, who is a senior bank manager.

But there is no escape from politics, which lurks around every corner; the ideology of the National Socialists is spreading and everyone must take sides. Sittinger finds solace only with his drinking companions, who include the eccentric Prussian aristocrat, Baron Gustav Heinrich von Ravél. Sittinger's middle-class drinking companions, by contrast, while initially not active supporters of the Nazi Party, also "believe Germany's problems are caused by the Reds, the Jews, France and lack of discipline".

Life in the Sittinger household is disrupted when a social-democratic newspaper reveals that Anna is having an affair with Malwine's former beau, Franz Eibenthaler, who has risen in the ranks of the Nazi Party.

Led by Captain Schlicht, the SA crush opposition in Sittinger's village during violent clashes following a carnival procession. As Hitler takes power, Malwine reveals that she has secretly registered her husband as a member of the Nazi Party. Sittinger is safe – for now.

== Interpretation ==
In a key passage of the novel, Graf writes: "There are thousands upon thousands of people like Sittinger in every country. Their number is legion. All the cleverness and cunning, all the faithlessness and wretchedness of a declining class is united in them. From time to time they are called ‘you’ and ‘me’…"

The novel may therefore be understood as a satire on lower middle-class attitudes as a universal phenomenon, not specifically in Weimar Germany. It demonstrates how easily any democracy can slide into dictatorship.
