= Peter Hamill =

Peter Hamill may refer to:

- Peter J. Hamill (c. 1885–1930), American politician
- Pete Hamill (1935–2020), American journalist

== See also ==
- Peter Hammill (born 1948), English musician
- Peter Hamel (1911–1979), German screenwriter and director
- Peter Michael Hamel (born 1947), German minimalist composer
