= Georg Bruckbauer =

Austrian cinematographer (1900–1976)

- Born: 23 July 1900; Vienna; Austria-Hungary
- Died: 13 April 1976 (aged 75); Bühl; West Germany
- Occupation: Cinematographer
- Years active: 1927 - 1965

Georg Bruckbauer (23 July 1900 – 13 April 1976) was an Austrian cinematographer who worked on over 120 films during his career.

== Selected filmography ==
- The Woman Who Couldn't Say No (1927)
- Light-Hearted Isabel (1927)
- Ariadne in Hoppegarten (1928)
- Dawn (1929)
- The Veil Dancer (1929)
- Echo of a Dream (1930)
- Die Sünde der Lissy Krafft (1930)
- Die Somme (1930)
- Circus Life (1931)
- Durand Versus Durand (1931)
- Melody of Love (1932)
- Tannenberg (1932)
- Trenck (1932)
- No Day Without You (1933)
- Little Girl, Great Fortune (1933)
- Invisible Opponent (1933)
- The Oil Sharks (1933)
- The Black Forest Girl (1933)
- Alte Kameraden (1934)
- A Precocious Girl (1934)
- Uncle Bräsig (1936)
- Back in the Country (1936)
- Stronger Than Regulations (1936)
- Don't Promise Me Anything (1937)
- Talking About Jacqueline (1937)
- Mother Song (1937)
- Konzert in Tirol (1938)
- Ursula Under Suspicion (1939)
- Prinzessin Sissy (1939)
- Mistake of the Heart (1939)
- Sighs of Spain (1939)
- My Daughter Lives in Vienna (1940)
- My Daughter Doesn't Do That (1940)
- Love is Duty Free (1941)
- The Thing About Styx (1942)
- The Big Number (1943)
- Romance in a Minor Key (1943)
- The Degenhardts (1944)
- Anna Alt (1945)
- Blocked Signals (1948)
- An Everyday Story (1948)
- Street Acquaintances (1948)
- Hello, Fraulein! (1949)
- When a Woman Loves (1950)
- Professor Nachtfalter (1951)
- Hanna Amon (1951)
- Maya of the Seven Veils (1951)
- Tanzende Sterne (1952)
- The Sergeant's Daughter (1952)
- The Colourful Dream (1952)
- I Can't Marry Them All (1952)
- The Chaplain of San Lorenzo (1953)
- Stars Over Colombo (1953)
- The Little Czar (1954)
- Verrat an Deutschland (1955)
- Love Without Illusions (1955)
- Love's Carnival (1955)
- The Congress Dances (1955)
- The Bath in the Barn (1956)
- And Who Is Kissing Me? (1956)
- Between Time and Eternity (1956)
- Seven Years Hard Luck (1957)
- Spring in Berlin (1957)
- The Legs of Dolores (1957)
- The Fox of Paris (1957)
- Night Nurse Ingeborg (1958)
- Black Forest Cherry Schnapps (1958)
- Iron Gustav (1958)
- The Muzzle (1958)
- That's No Way to Land a Man (1959)
- Paradise for Sailors (1959)
- Every Day Isn't Sunday (1959)
- The Red Hand (1960)
- Final Accord (1960)
- You Must Be Blonde on Capri (1961)
- The Maharajah's Blonde (1962)
- Is Geraldine an Angel? (1963)
- And So to Bed (1963)

== Bibliography ==
- Shandley, Robert R. Rubble Films: German Cinema in the Shadow of the Third Reich. Temple University Press, 2001.
