= Hanna Amon =

1951 film

- Directed by: Veit Harlan
- Written by: Veit Harlan; Richard Billinger
- Produced by: Willy Zeyn
- Starring: Kristina Söderbaum; Lutz Moik; Ilse Steppat
- Cinematography: Georg Bruckbauer; Werner Krien
- Edited by: Walter Boos
- Music by: Hans-Otto Borgmann
- Production company: Zeyn Film
- Distributed by: Herzog Film
- Release date: 21 December 1951
- Running time: 106 minutes
- Country: West Germany
- Language: German

Hanna Amon is a 1951 German Agfacolor drama film directed by Veit Harlan and starring Kristina Söderbaum, Lutz Moik and Ilse Steppat. It was shot at the Göttingen Studios and on location in Upper Bavaria. The film's sets were designed by the art directors Hans Berthel and Rochus Gliese. It was the second film after Immortal Beloved (also 1951) in a post-war comeback by director Harlan and his wife Söderbaum, who remained controversial figures due to their association with the Nazi era. Both films were major commercial hits, despite calls for a boycott.

== Synopsis ==
Hanna and her brother Thomas Amon live on the estate of their deceased parents. Initially very much focused on each other, they remain oblivious to the fact that Hanna is secretly admired by the local veterinary while the mayor's daughter has a crush on Thomas.

However, Thomas then falls for the much older Vera Colombani, a seductive castle owner. Ignoring his sister's warnings, he follows her to the south, where they spend the winter.

When Thomas is dropped by Colombani, he returns to the estate. A renewed encounter with his lover triggers a downward spiral which claims the lives of Colombani and Hanna.

== Cast ==
- Kristina Söderbaum as Hanna Amon
- Lutz Moik as Thomas Amon
- Ilse Steppat as Vera Colombani
- Hermann Schomberg as Alois Brunner
- Susanne Körber as Rosl, Tochter des Bürgermeisters
- Elise Aulinger as Frau Brunner
- Hedwig Wangel as Frau Zorneder
- Hans Hermann Schaufuß as Bürgermeister
- Emmy Percy-Wüstenhagen as Bürgermeisterin
- Brigitte Schubert as Lioba
- Günther Hadank as Pfarrer
- Wolf Ackva as Entresser
- Franz Schafheitlin as Gefängnisdirektor
- Jakob Tiedtke as Wirt
- Ferdinand Anton as Hans Zorneder
- Caspar Harlan as Hannes

== Bibliography ==
- Baer, Hester. Dismantling the Dream Factory: Gender, German Cinema, and the Postwar Quest for a New Film Language. Berghahn Books, 2012.
- Halle, Randall & McCarthy, Margaret. Light Motives: German Popular Film in Perspective. Wayne State University Press, 2003.
- Noack, Frank. Veit Harlan: The Life and Work of a Nazi Filmmaker. University Press of Kentucky, 2016.
