= Oh, You Dear Fridolin =

1952 film

- Directed by: Peter Hamel
- Written by: Franz Geiger; Robert Gillner
- Starring: Hans Reiser; Ingrid Andree; Otto Gebühr
- Cinematography: Bruno Stephan
- Music by: Rudolf Perak; Fred Strittmatter
- Production company: Badal-Film
- Distributed by: Union-Film
- Release date: 9 November 1952
- Running time: 97 minutes
- Country: West Germany
- Language: German

Oh, You Dear Fridolin (German: Oh, du lieber Fridolin) is a 1952 West German comedy film directed by Peter Hamel and starring Hans Reiser, Ingrid Andree and Otto Gebühr. It was shot at the Bendestorf Studios near Hamburg and on location around Munich. The film's sets were designed by the art director Hans Berthel.

== Cast ==
- Hans Reiser as Fridolin, ein junger Dichter
- Ingrid Andree as Alice, Fotoreporter
- Otto Gebühr as Korbinian, Alices Vater
- Charlott Daudert as Gräfin Bleuforet
- Fritz Rémond Jr. as Hirschbrunner
- Max Mairich as Direktor Sturzkopf
- Willy Maertens as Dr. Mond, Verleger
- Harald Paulsen as Duellwütiger Säbelfechter
- Ilse Zielstorff as Tochter des Säbelfechters
- Hans Caninenberg as Edgar
- Paula Braend as Frau Griesmeier
- Franz-Otto Krüger as Rundfunkreporter
- Kurt Fuß as Jerome, Diener
- Knut Mahlke as Klein-Franzl
- Alf Pankarter as Ringrichter Wannemaker
- Hans Schwarz Jr. as Schmidt, alias Smith
- Apollon as Bill, ein Neger
- Albert Florath
- Susanne Navrath as Klein-Claudia
- Popescu as Neumann alias Nadolny
- Vavra as Brettschneider alias Popolowsky

== Bibliography ==
- Hans-Michael Bock and Tim Bergfelder. The Concise Cinegraph: An Encyclopedia of German Cinema. Berghahn Books, 2009.
