= The Red Hand =

- Directed by: Kurt Meisel
- Written by: Ernst Neubach
- Produced by: Ernst Neubach
- Starring: Paul Hubschmid; Hannes Messemer; Eleonora Rossi Drago
- Cinematography: Georg Bruckbauer
- Edited by: Ingrid Wacker
- Music by: Harald Böhmelt
- Production company: Ernst Neubach-Film
- Distributed by: Constantin Film
- Release date: 26 October 1960
- Running time: 98 minutes
- Country: West Germany
- Language: German

The Red Hand (German: Die rote Hand) is a 1960 West German crime thriller film directed by Kurt Meisel and starring Paul Hubschmid, Hannes Messemer and Eleonora Rossi Drago.

The film's sets were designed by the art directors Emil Hasler and Walter Kutz.

The film is inspired by the La Main Rouge affair in Western Germany.

== Cast ==
- Paul Hubschmid as Johnny Zamaris
- Hannes Messemer as Mahora Khan
- Eleonora Rossi Drago as Violetta Scotoni
- Susanne von Almassy as Maria Gomez
- Rainer Brandt as Carnetti
- Fritz Rémond Jr. as Theaterdirektor Jif
- Willi Rose as Inspektor Auer
- Kurt Waitzmann as Inspektor Wolff
- Klaus Becker as Rolando
- Toni Herbert as Attermann
- Erich Fiedler as Attaché Bertrand
- Harald Maresch as Grieche
- Edith Schollwer as Frau Hasselbütt
- Almut Berg as Rosl
- Edgar O. Faiss as Popoff
- Eva Schreiber as Anni

== Bibliography ==
- Bock, Hans-Michael & Bergfelder, Tim. The Concise CineGraph. Encyclopedia of German Cinema. Berghahn Books, 2009.
