= Vater Seidl und sein Sohn =

- Created by: Kurt Wilhelm
- Directed by: Kurt Wilhelm
- Starring: Walter Sedlmayr; Hans Clarin
- Composer: Rolf A. Wilhelm
- Country of origin: West Germany
- Original language: German
- No. of series: 1
- No. of episodes: 6

Production
- Running time: 60 minutes
- Production company: Bayerischer Rundfunk

Original release
- Network: ARD
- Release: 4 September 1976

Vater Seidl und sein Sohn is a German television series. It is a remake of the 1954 television series of the same title.

== See also ==
- List of German television series
