= Die Hausmeisterin =

- Created by: Cornelia Zaglmann-Willinger
- Starring: Veronika Fitz; Helmut Fischer; Ilse Neubauer; Bettina Redlich; Janis Kyriakidis Ernst Cohen
- Country of origin: Germany
- No. of seasons: 3
- No. of episodes: 23

Production
- Running time: 45 minutes

Original release
- Network: BR Fernsehen
- Release: 19 November 1987 – 2 September 1992

Die Hausmeisterin is a German television series that originally aired in three seasons from 1987 to 1992. The storyline revolves around newly divorced Martha Haslbeck who works as a live in janitor at an apartment building located in the Haidhausen neighborhood of Munich.

== See also ==
- List of German television series
