= When a Woman Loves (film) =

1950 film

- Directed by: Wolfgang Liebeneiner
- Written by: Felix von Eckardt
- Based on: Don't Promise Me Anything by Charlotte Rissmann
- Produced by: Heinrich Jonen
- Starring: Hilde Krahl; Johannes Heesters; Mathias Wieman
- Cinematography: Georg Bruckbauer
- Edited by: Rudolf Schaad
- Music by: Hans-Martin Majewski
- Production company: Meteor Film
- Distributed by: Herzog Film
- Release date: 31 August 1950
- Running time: 102 minutes
- Country: West Germany
- Language: German

When a Woman Loves (German: Wenn eine Frau liebt) is a 1950 West German comedy film directed by Wolfgang Liebeneiner and starring Hilde Krahl, Johannes Heesters and Mathias Wieman. It is based on the play Don't Promise Me Anything by Charlotte Rissmann, which Liebeneiner had previously made into a 1937 film of the same title.

It was filmed at Afifa Studios in Wiesbaden and on location around the city. The film's sets were designed by the art directors Paul Markwitz and Fritz Maurischat.

== Cast ==
- Hilde Krahl as Monika Pratt
- Johannes Heesters as Martin Pratt
- Mathias Wieman as Felder, Kunsthändler
- Wilfried Seyferth as Konsul Brenkow
- Gusti Wolf as Vera Brenkow
- Fritz Rémond Jr. as Dr. Elk
- Ursula Herking as Fräulein Klette
- Peter Zlonitzky as Gustav
- Clemens Wilmenrod as Präsident
- Arno Hassenpflug as Kunstbeirat
- Hans Mahnke as Herr Lemke
- Käthe Lindberg as Frau Lemke
- Willi Umminger as Fleischer
- Heinz Laube as Kaufmann
- Axel Mentz as Bäckerjunge
- Hilde Kuckertz as Verkäuferin Modesalon
- Eva Jaworsky as Illa - Freundin von Vera
- Gitta Krell as Directrice Modesalon
- Hermann Kunder as Diener bei Felder
- Hannelore Könemann as Marie - Hausmädchen
- Peter Paul as Diener Sportschule
- Beate Rensing as Reporterin

== Bibliography ==
- Reimer, Robert C. & Reimer, Carol J. The A to Z of German Cinema. Scarecrow Press, 2010.
