= Kir Royal – Aus dem Leben eines Klatschreporters =

- Created by: Helmut Dietl
- Country of origin: West Germany
- No. of seasons: 1
- No. of episodes: 6

Original release
- Network: ARD
- Release: 1986 – 1986

Kir Royal – Aus dem Leben eines Klatschreporters (Kir Royal – From the Life of a Gossip Reporter) is a six-part television series directed by Helmut Dietl, released in 1986. A satirical portrayal of Munich's 1980s elite "Schicki-Micki" (chic and trendy) social scene, the show parodies the Munich-based newspaper Abendzeitung and its real-life gossip columnist Michael Graeter and publisher Anneliese Friedmann. The series centers on fictional tabloid reporter Baby Schimmerlos, who navigates the glamorous yet cutthroat world of celebrity journalism, chronicling the excesses and intrigues of Munich's high society.

== Plot ==
=== 1. "Wer reinkommt, ist drin" ("Who Comes In, Is In") ===
Gossip reporter Baby Schimmerlos writes a series critiquing Munich’s high-end restaurants, but his articles fail to resonate with their intended audience. His girlfriend, Mona, urges him to submit his expense reports to the newspaper, though their frequent dining at luxury establishments strains their finances. Compounded by costly home renovations, the couple faces financial ruin. A contractor offers discounted work in exchange for publicity in Baby’s column, but Baby indignantly refuses.

Industrialist Henry Haffenloher (Mario Adorf), frustrated by his absence from Schimmerlos’ column, visits the Champs Elysées restaurant to fabricate a scene of revelry, inviting freeloaders to create the illusion of popularity. Mona grows disillusioned with the contrived spectacle. Haffenloher later blackmails Schimmerlos’ publisher, demanding a mention in the column in exchange for lucrative advertisements. Schimmerlos reluctantly complies after a tense negotiation, staging another event at the restaurant with Haffenloher and the contractor in attendance.

By the episode’s end, all parties achieve their goals—Mona secures her renovated floor, Haffenloher gains publicity, and the restaurant thrives—but Schimmerlos, morally conflicted, retreats alone to a corner, drinking and smoking to the strains of the can-can from Orpheus in the Underworld.

=== 2. "Muttertag" ("Mother's Day") ===
Baby’s impoverished, ailing mother visits his apartment to clean and cook, only to discover another woman in his bed. Meanwhile, Baby pursues rumors of a famous actress’s pregnancy, pressuring film crew members for information despite threats. He publishes the unverified story, sparking a confrontation at a reception involving the actress’s furious producers and Mona, who has learned of Baby’s infidelity. The episode concludes tragically with the death of Baby’s mother.

=== 3. "Das Volk sieht nichts" ("The People See Nothing") ===
Baby collaborates with old friend Hubert Dürkheimer (Boy Gobert) to purchase land near Lake Starnberg for a private country club, acting as a straw buyer financed by Hubert. However, political interference, Mona’s skepticism, and Hubert’s ulterior motives derail the scheme, exposing Baby’s naivety and leaving him disillusioned.

=== 4. "Adieu Claire" ("Goodbye Claire") ===
Amid a slow news cycle, Baby resorts to stealing newspapers for research. He stumbles upon a story involving composer Friedrich Danziger (Curt Bois), who is terminally ill, and his estranged lover Claire, a French singer who vowed never to return to Germany after fleeing the Nazis. Baby orchestrates a reunion in Munich, but his efforts are co-opted by authorities, culminating in a bittersweet toast to the police chief rather than a heartfelt resolution.

=== 5. "Königliche Hoheit" ("Royal Highness") ===
The Queen of Mandalia (Michaela May) visits Munich, ostensibly for diplomatic purposes. Baby and his colleague Herbie uncover her covert mission to procure weapons from arms dealer Hugo Raeber (Paul Hubschmid) to suppress dissent in her homeland. Mona confronts Baby over his ethical compromises, but he prioritizes the exposé, straining their relationship further.

=== 6. "Karriere" ("Career") ===
Bored with gossip journalism, Baby and Herbie stalk billionaire Banz to expose his secret indulgences. Meanwhile, Mona reignites her childhood singing aspirations, recording a demo with producer Peggy. Baby dismisses her ambitions, leading to a bitter argument. After capturing photos of Banz in a bizarre royal-themed escapade, Baby faces a choice: pursue the scandal or reconcile with Mona. He chooses the latter but arrives too late—Mona’s singing career launches without him, and their relationship collapses. The series ends with Baby unemployed and alone, watching Mona’s billboard debut.

== Cast ==
- Franz Xaver Kroetz – Baby Schimmerlos
- Dieter Hildebrandt – photographer Herbie Fried
- Senta Berger – Mona
- Billie Zöckler – secretary Edda Pfaff
- Ruth Maria Kubitschek – Friederike von Unruh
