= That's No Way to Land a Man =

1959 film

- Directed by: Hans Deppe
- Written by: Janne Furch; Fritz A. Koeniger
- Produced by: Kurt Ulrich
- Starring: Grethe Weiser; Karin Dor; Karin Baal
- Cinematography: Georg Bruckbauer
- Edited by: Klaus Eckstein
- Music by: Heino Gaze
- Production company: Kurt Ulrich Film
- Distributed by: Deutsche Film Hansa
- Release date: 1959
- Running time: 97 minutes
- Country: West Germany
- Language: German

That's No Way to Land a Man (German: So angelt man keinen Mann) is a 1959 West German comedy film directed by Hans Deppe and starring Grethe Weiser, Karin Dor and Karin Baal. It was shot at the Göttingen Studios. The film's sets were designed by the art director Willi Herrmann.

== Cast ==
- Grethe Weiser as Elsbeth Müller
- Karin Dor as Tessy
- Karin Baal as Monika
- Sabine Eggerth as Angela
- Erik Schumann as Stefan Reimer
- Peter Vogel as Fritz Becker
- Bruno Fritz as Wilhelm Böckelmann
- Erica Beer as Vera Reinhardt
- Walter Giller as Anton Scheufele
- Fritz Rémond Jr. as Opernsänger Müller
- Walter Ambrock as Günther Arnold
- Michael Verhoeven as Horst Burkhardt
- Ruth Nimbach as Fräulein Stenzel
- Willi Rose as Trainer
- Carlos Miranda as Sänger
- Ivo Carraro as Sänger

== Bibliography ==
- Hans-Michael Bock and Tim Bergfelder. The Concise Cinegraph: An Encyclopedia of German Cinema. Berghahn Books, 2009.
