= Walter-Sedlmayr-Platz =

Square in Munich, Germany

Coordinates: 48.2135°N 11.5401°E

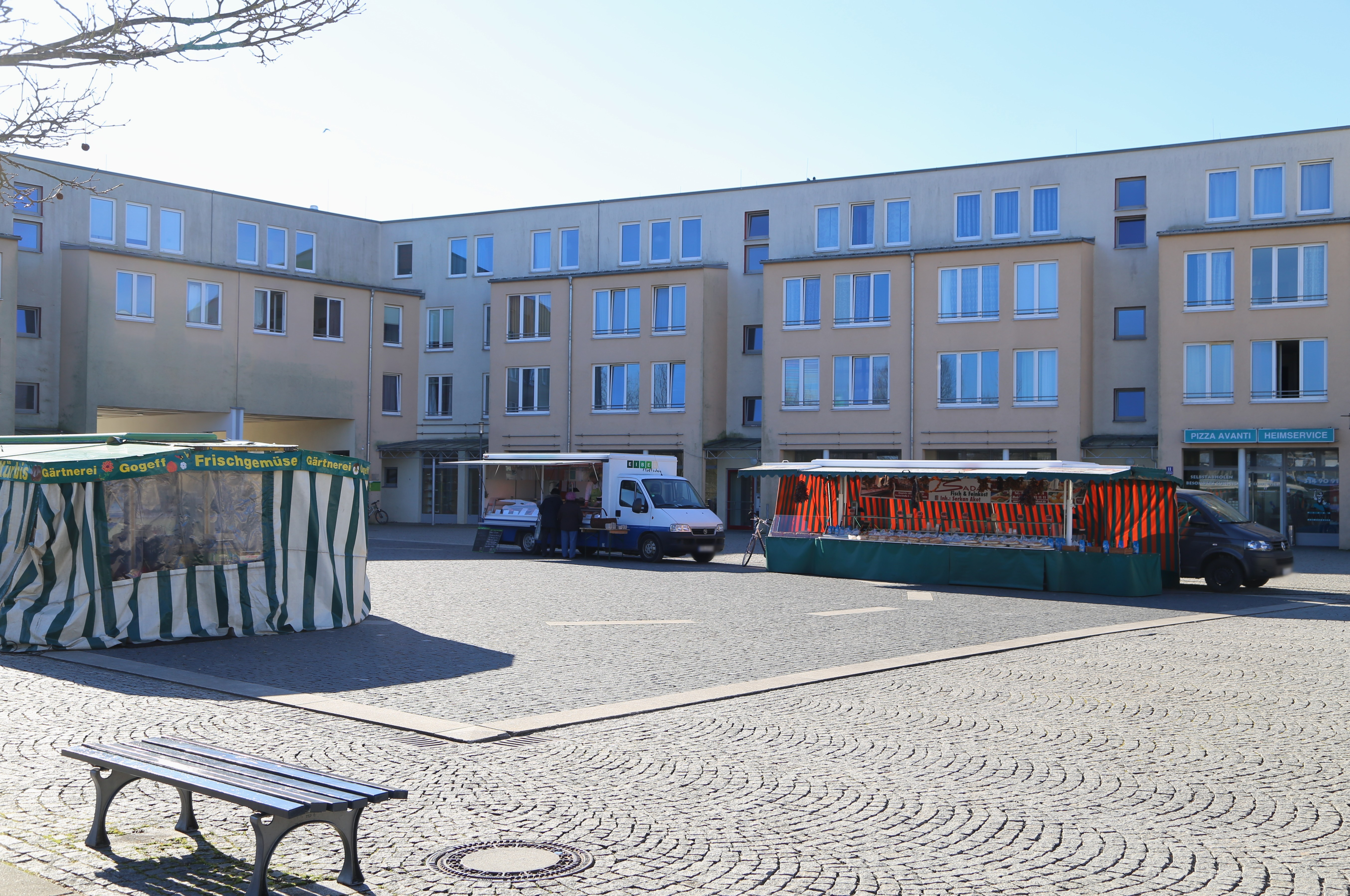
Weekly market at Walter-Sedlmayr-Platz

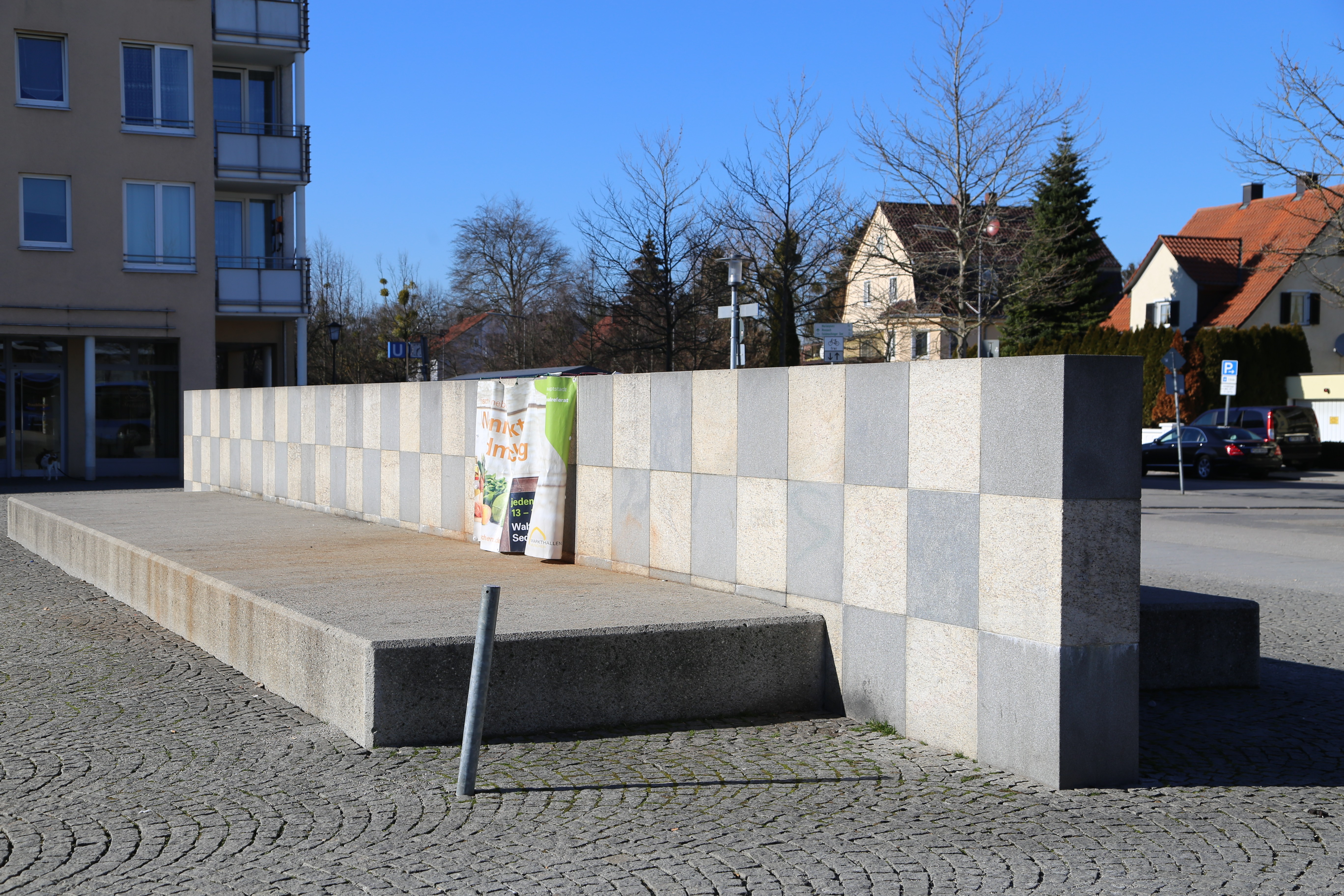
Walter-Sedlmayr-Platz

The Walter-Sedlmayr-Platz is a square in Munich-Feldmoching. It is located west of the train station München-Feldmoching.

== Description ==
A weekly market is held there every Friday from 13:00 to 18:00. In cooperation with Neue Wege e. V., a non-profit organisation for youth welfare and social support, the association Kinderschutz München revitalises the Walter-Sedlmayer-Platz on Tuesdays with football tables, table tennis tables, throwing discs, badminton sets, painting facilities and balls.

The approx. 0.22 ha large station forecourt was designed by Ludger Gerdes in 2003. The construction cost amounted to 980,000 EUR's. For 2017, a comprehensive redevelopment into a neighbourhood and business centre was planned.

The square was named in 2000 after the Munich folk actor Walter Sedlmayr.

== Transportation connections ==
The station München-Feldmoching with the U2 and S1 lines is nearby. Only a few meters from the Walter-Sedlmayr-Platz are bus stops for the bus lines 170, 171 and 173.
