= Wolfgang Werlé and Manfred Lauber =

German murderers

Wolfgang Werlé
- Status: Released on parole in 2007 after serving 15 years in prison
- Criminal charge: Murder
- Penalty: Life imprisonment

Manfred Lauber
- Status: Released on parole in 2008 after serving 16 years in prison
- Criminal charge: Murder
- Penalty: Life imprisonment

Wolfgang Werlé and Manfred Lauber are German half-brothers who were convicted of the 1990 murder of actor Walter Sedlmayr. The murder, and subsequent trial and conviction of Werlé and Lauber in 1993, received extensive media coverage in Germany and elsewhere.

In 2009, Werlé and Lauber again received international media coverage when Werlé attempted to remove his name from foreign media sources, including the English language Wikipedia, citing German privacy laws.

== Sedlmayr murder and trial ==
On 15 July 1990, Sedlmayr's body was found in the bedroom of his Munich apartment. He had been tied up, stabbed in the stomach with a knife and was beaten about his head with a hammer. On 21 May 1993, a Munich court found Wolfgang Werlé and his half-brother guilty of Sedlmayr's murder and sentenced both to life imprisonment. Sedlmayr was one of Germany's prominent actors, and the case was described by the Berliner Morgenpost as "the most spectacular in Munich's postwar history."

Witnesses at the trial said that the two brothers were involved in business disputes with Sedlmayr. The case became notable for its lurid tabloid newspaper coverage of Sedlmayr's homosexuality, which had previously been private. The German media reported the identities of both of the brothers at the time of the trial. An appeal against the convictions was rejected in 1994.

Werlé was released on parole in August 2007, while Lauber was released in 2008. Both brothers continue to protest their innocence, and questions have been raised about the fingerprint evidence. In 1998, a fingerprint from the shower curtain of the apartment was identified as belonging to a 44-year-old man from Ingolstadt who had previously been questioned, but denied involvement with the murder.

== Privacy dispute ==
On 27 October 2009, lawyers for Wolfgang Werlé sent the Wikimedia Foundation a cease and desist letter requesting that Werlé's name be removed from the English language Wikipedia article "Walter Sedlmayr", citing a 1973 Federal Constitutional Court decision that allows the suppression of a criminal's name in news accounts once he is released from custody. Previously, the attorney for both men, Alexander H. Stopp, had won a default judgment in German court, on behalf of Lauber, against the Wikimedia Foundation. According to the Electronic Frontier Foundation, Werlé's lawyers also challenged an Internet service provider in Austria which published the names of the convicted killers.

The Wikimedia Foundation is based in the United States, where the First Amendment to the United States Constitution protects freedom of speech and freedom of the press, under which the articles on Wikipedia would fall. In Germany, the law seeks to protect the name and likenesses of private persons from unwanted publicity. On 18 January 2008, a court in Hamburg supported the personality rights of Werlé, which under German law includes removing his name from archive coverage of the case.

On 12 November 2009, The New York Times reported that Wolfgang Werlé had a case pending against the Wikimedia Foundation in a German court. The editors of the German-language Wikipedia article about Sedlmayr removed the names of the murderers, which have since then been restored to the article. The Guardian observed that the lawsuit has led to the Streisand effect, an upsurge in publicity for the case resulting from the legal action.

On 15 December 2009, the German Federal Court of Justice (Bundesgerichtshof) in Karlsruhe ruled that German websites do not have to check their archives in order to provide permanent protection of personality rights for convicted criminals. The case occurred after the names of the brothers were found on the website of Deutschlandradio, in an archive article dating from July 2000. The presiding judge Gregor Galke stated "This is not a blank check", and pointed out that the right to rehabilitation of offenders had been taken into consideration.

On 28 June 2018, the European Court of Human Rights ruled that the German Federal Court of Justice had been right to reject the request to ban publication of the killers' names in 2009, saying "The approach to covering a given subject was a matter of journalistic freedom, and reporting individualised information was an important aspect of the press's work."
