= Hans Berthel =

German art director

- Born: 19 October 1914; Nuremberg, Bavaria, German Empire
- Died: 18 January 2003 (aged 88); Lenggries, Bavaria, Germany
- Occupation: Art Director
- Years active: 1950-1964 (film)

Hans Berthel (1914 – 2003) was a German art director active in the West German film industry. During the Second World War he served in the Luftwaffe, spending time as a prisoner of war in Canada.

== Selected filmography ==
- Hanna Amon (1951)
- Oh, You Dear Fridolin (1952)
- Guitars of Love (1954)
- Sky Without Stars (1955)
- Heroism after Hours (1955)
- Santa Lucia (1956)
- Rose Bernd (1957)
- The Crammer (1958)
- A Gift for Heidi (1958)
- Iron Gustav (1958)
- I Aim at the Stars (1960)
- The Black Sheep (1960)
- Girl from Hong Kong (1961)
- Armored Command (1961)
- Between Shanghai and St. Pauli (1962)
- The Hot Port of Hong Kong (1962)
- Life Begins at Eight (1962)
- The Pirates of the Mississippi (1963)
- The Black Panther of Ratana (1963)

== Bibliography ==
- Patrick Lucanio & Gary Coville. Smokin' Rockets: The Romance of Technology in American Film, Radio and Television, 1945-1962. McFarland, 2002.
