= Peter und Paul =

- Starring: Helmut Fischer; Hans Clarin
- Country of origin: Germany

Peter und Paul is a short-running (14 episodes) German television series released in 1994. The first 10 episodes ran on RTL between 11 April and 20 June 1994, and the last four between 8–29 April 1998.

The two protagonists of the series are Peter Elfinger (Helmut Fischer) and Paul Schneck (Hans Clarin), the mayors of Hohenwaldau and Niederwaldau, neighboring towns the Chiemgau area of Upper Bavaria. The men are brothers in law, as Schneck is married to Elfinger's sister Elisabeth (Ilse Neubauer). Elfinger and Schneck have known each other since childhood and maintain a friendly rivalry: they are very fond of each other, but never miss an opportunity to one-up one another with affectionate perfidy and malice, often under the pretext that it is for the good of their respective villages.

== See also ==
- List of German television series
