= Fritz Rémond Jr. =

German actor

- Born: 9 October 1902; Karlsruhe, German Empire
- Died: 31 March 1976 (aged 73); Bad Nauheim, Hesse, West Germany
- Occupations: Actor, Director
- Years active: 1944-1971 (film & TV)

Fritz Rémond Jr. (1902–1976) was a German actor of stage, film and television.

== Selected filmography ==
- When a Woman Loves (1950)
- Oh, You Dear Fridolin (1952)
- Captain Bay-Bay (1953)
- I Was an Ugly Girl (1955)
- Night of Decision (1956)
- That's No Way to Land a Man (1959)
- The Red Hand (1960)
- Life Begins at Eight (1962)
- The Endless Night (1963)

== Bibliography ==
- Christoph Schwandt. Oper in Köln: von den Anfängen bis zur Gegenwart. Dittrich, 2007.
