= Oskar Maria Graf =

Bavarian/American non-fiction writer

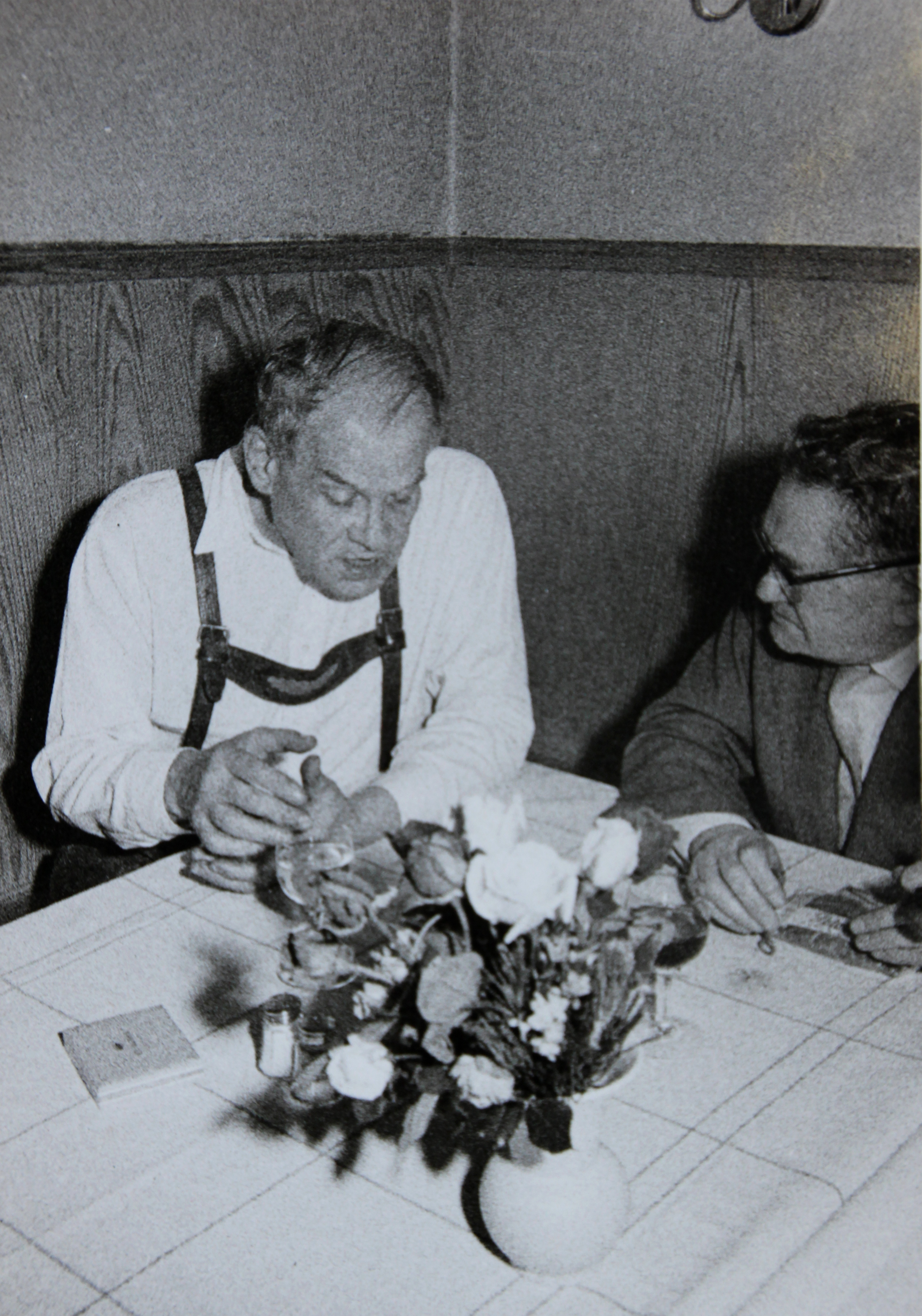
- Oskar Maria Graf (left) with Gottlieb Branz (right) in 1958
- Born: Oskar Graf; 22 July 1894
- Died: 28 June 1967 (aged 72)
- Writing career
- Pen name: Oskar Graf-Berg

Oskar Maria Graf (22 July 1894 – 28 June 1967) was a German-American writer who wrote several narratives about life in Bavaria, mostly autobiographical. In the beginning, Graf wrote under his real name Oskar Graf. After 1918, his works for newspapers were signed with the pseudonym Oskar Graf-Berg; only for those of his works he regarded as "worth reading", he used the name Oskar Maria Graf.

== Life ==
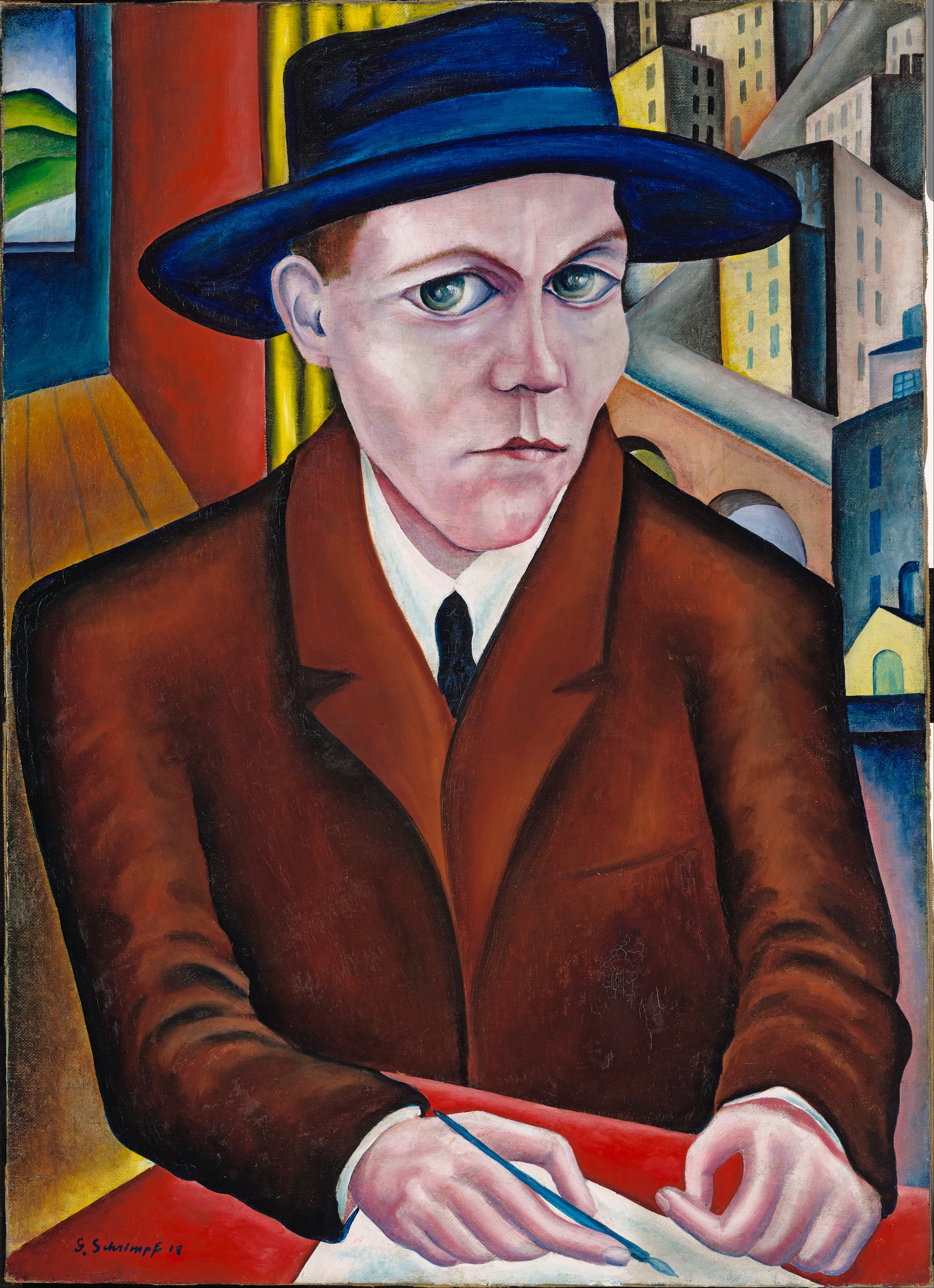
Portrait of Oskar Maria Graf (1927) by Georg Schrimpf

Graf was born in Berg in the Kingdom of Bavaria, situated in the picturesque landscape around Lake Starnberg near Munich. He was the ninth child of baker Max Graf and his wife Therese (née Heimrath), a farmer's daughter. From 1900 onwards he went to the state school in Aufkirchen, in the municipality of Berg. After his father died in 1906, he learned the baker's trade and worked for his brother Max, who had taken over their father's bakery.

In 1911, hoping to earn a living as a poet, he fled to Munich to escape his brother who treated him badly, sometimes resorting to violence towards his family members. He joined bohemian circles and took odd jobs like mail sorting and operating an elevator. In 1912 and 1913, he traveled to Ticino and northern Italy.

On 1 December 1914, he was drafted into Imperial German Army service. A year later, he published his first story, in the magazine Die Freie Straße ["Free street"]. In 1916, Graf was nearly court-martialed for refusing a command given by a superior officer. However, after a ten-day hunger strike, he was sent to a psychiatric hospital and was later discharged from the military.

On 26 May 1917, Graf married Karoline Bretting. A year later, their daughter Annemarie (13 June 1918 – 2008), nicknamed Annamirl, was born. Earlier that year, Graf had gotten arrested for participating in a munitions workers' strike. Around the same time, he also met the woman who would later become his second wife, Mirjam Sachs, the sister of Manfred George and a cousin of Nelly Sachs. In 1919, Graf was arrested again for participating in revolutionary movements in Munich.

In 1920, he was active as a dramaturg at the working-class theater Die neue Bühne ("The new stage"), until he achieved literary fame in 1927 with his memoir Wir sind Gefangene (Prisoners All), which allowed him to make a living as a freelance writer. The book was retranslated into English, and republished with the title We Are Prisoners in 2020.

On 17 February 1933, he traveled to Vienna to give a lecture, a trip that marked the beginning of his voluntary exile from Germany. Graf's books were not included in the Nazi book burning; at the time, most of them were actually approved by the Nazis as recommended reading. In response, Graf published an appeal that subsequently became famous, Verbrennt mich! ["Burn me!"] in Vienna's Arbeiterzeitung.

By 1934, Graf's books were banned in Germany. On February, he emigrated to Brno in Czechoslovakia. On 24 March, the Third Reich revoked his citizenship. Graf left Brno to take part in the First Congress of Soviet Writers in Moscow.

In 1938, Graf left Europe via the Netherlands, arriving in New York City in July. Mirjam Sachs followed him while his wife and daughter remained in Germany. In October 1938, he was appointed president of the German American Writers Association. In 1942, together with Wieland Herzfelde and other German writers in exile, he founded the German-language publishing house Aurora-Verlag in New York, which was later considered as the successor to Malik-Verlag. In 1944, Graf's first wife finally agreed to a divorce, which allowed Graf and Sachs to marry.

In 1958, Graf became an American citizen and visited Europe for the first time since World War II.

In 1960, he was awarded an honorary doctoral degree by Detroit's Wayne State University, "in recognition of his uncompromising intellectual attitude". In 1962, he was honored by the City of Munich "in appreciation of his important literary works".

Graf died in 1967 in New York City. A year after his death, his ashes were interred at the old Bogenhausen cemetery in Munich.

There is an upper secondary school (Gymnasium) in Neufahrn bei Freising, north of Munich, that is named in honor of Oskar Maria Graf.

== Works ==
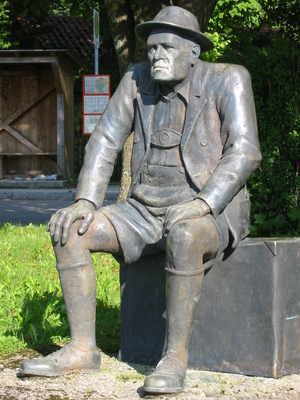
Statue of Oskar Maria Graf in his hometown of Berg by Max Wagner (born 1956)

In German:

- Die Revolutionäre (1918), Gedichte
- Amen und Anfang (1919), Gedichte
- Frühzeit (1920), Jugenderlebnisse
- Ua-Pua (1921), Indianerdichtungen
- Zur freundlichen Erinnerung (1922), soziale Novellen
- Bayrisches Lesebücherl (1924), Kulturbilder
- Die Traumdeuter (1924), Erzählungen
- Die Chronik von Flechting (1925), Roman
- Finsternis (1926), sechs Dorfgeschichten
- Wunderbare Menschen (1927), Chronik und Autobiographie
- Wir sind Gefangene (1927), Autobiographisches ISBN 3-423-01612-4
- Licht und Schatten (1927), soziale Märchen
- Bayrisches Dekameron (1928), Erzählungen ISBN 3-548-60345-9
- Die Heimsuchung (1925), Roman
- Im Winkel des Lebens (1927), Erzählungen
- Kalendergeschichten (1929), Geschichten aus Stadt und Land ISBN 3-423-11434-7
- Notizbuch des Provinzschriftstellers Oskar Maria Graf (1932), Satire ISBN 3-935877-49-8
- Bolwieser (1931; English The Station Master), Roman; Neuausgabe 1964 unter dem Titel Die Ehe des Herrn Bolwieser ISBN 3-442-72253-5
- Einer gegen alle (1932; English title The Wolf), Roman
- Dorfbanditen (1932), Jugenderinnerungen
- Der harte Handel (1935), Bauernroman ISBN 3-423-11480-0
- Der Abgrund (1936), Roman (überarbeiteten Fassung "Die gezählten Jahre"(1976)
- Anton Sittinger (originally Sittinger bleibt obenauf) (1937), Roman ISBN 3-423-12453-9
- Der Quasterl (1938), Dorf- und Jugendgeschichten
- The Life of My Mother (1940 in English language; 1946 German version Das Leben meiner Mutter) ISBN 3-423-10044-3
- Unruhe um einen Friedfertigen (1947), Roman, New York, Aurora-Verlag ISBN 3-471-77264-2
- Mitmenschen (1948), Erzählungen
- Die Eroberung der Welt (1949), Roman; Neuauflage 1959 unter dem Titel Die Erben des Untergangs ISBN 3-423-11880-6
- Menschen aus meiner Jugend auf dem Dorfe (1953), Erzählungen
- Der ewige Kalender (1954), Gedichte
- Die Flucht ins Mittelmäßige (1959), Roman
- An manchen Tagen. Reden, Gedanken und Zeitbetrachtungen (1961)
- Der große Bauernspiegel (1962), Erzählungen
- Größtenteils schimpflich (1962), Jugenderinnerungen
- Altmodische Gedichte eines Dutzendmenschen (1962)
- Er nannte sich Banscho (1964), Roman
- Gelächter von außen. Aus meinem Leben 1918–1933 (1966)
- Reise in die Sowjetunion 1934 (1974)
- The Dupe's Words (1976), Kinderbuch

In English:

- We Are Prisoners (new translation by Ed Walker, 2020), an autobiography in the form of a novel ISBN 9-781-07738344-9
- Anton Sittinger (first translation, by Ed Walker, 2025), ISBN 9-798-33821257-8

== See also ==
- Exilliteratur
