= Ariela Bogenberger =

German screenwriter, producer, cabaret director, and journalist

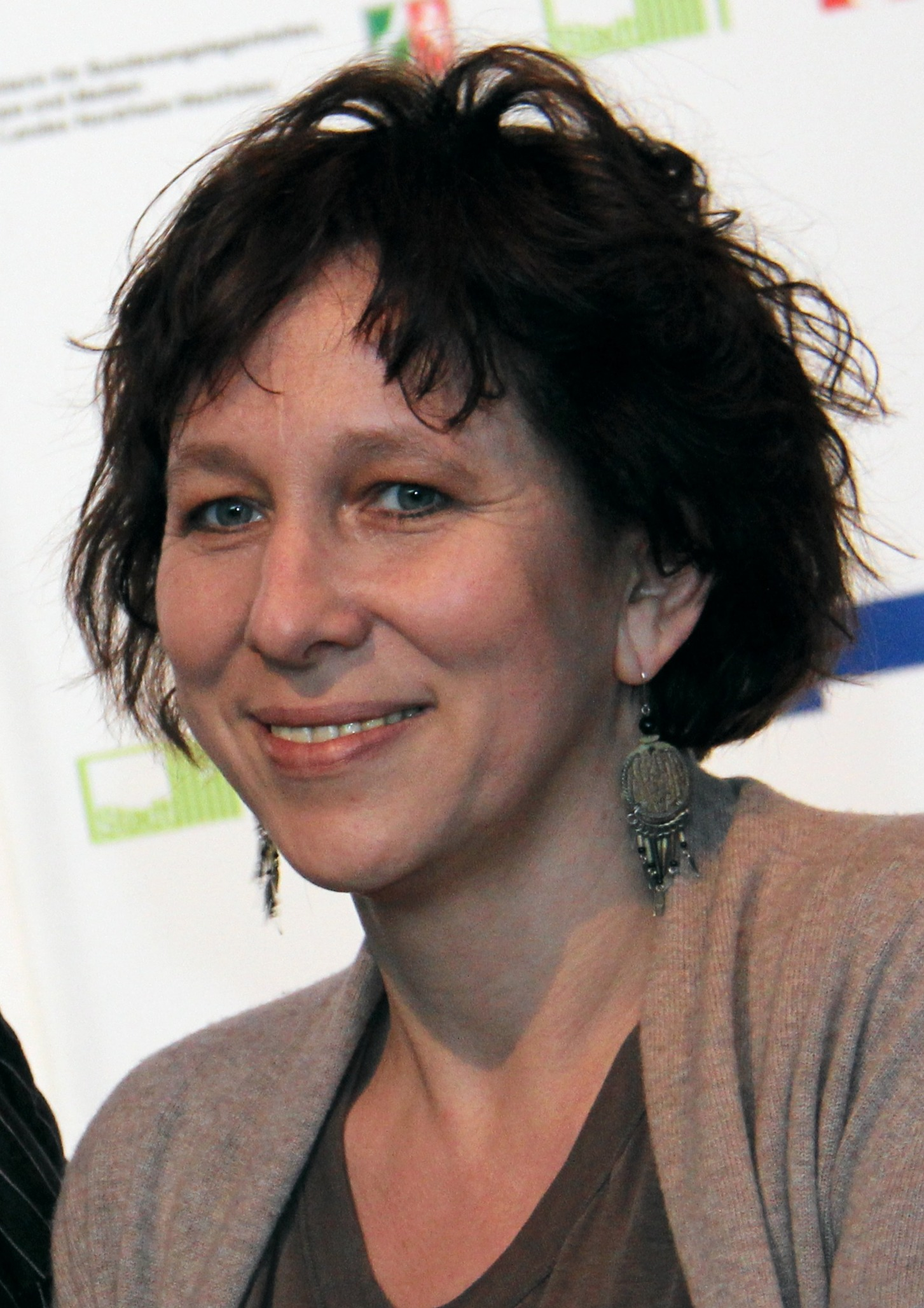
Ariela Bogenberger, in 2011.

Ariela Bogenberger (born February 27, 1962, in Munich) is a German screenwriter, producer, cabaret director and journalist.

== Career ==
Bogenberger is the daughter of Veronika Fitz and the actor Willi Anders.

Bogenberger worked as a journalist for the Badische Zeitung, the Münchner Merkur, the Münchner Theaterzeitung and BR-Hörfunk. She was responsible for several episodes of the cabaret television series Das Brettl as author and producer. She also worked as a cabaret director and as an author for the BR productions Live aus dem Schlachthof and Frauensache. In 2000 she was a scholarship holder of the Celle School. In 2002/2003 she completed the Drehbuchwerkstatt München, since then she has been active as a screenwriter. Her first book was the basis for Rainer Kaufmann's multi-award-winning television film Marias's Last Journey.

In 2017, she reported on her 18-year membership (1997–2015) in the sect-like Kirschblütengemeinschaft of the guru Samuel Widmer in Petra K. Wagner's documentary film Aussteigen.

== Private life ==
She lives with her husband, the composer and crime novelist ("Chiemsee Blues") Thomas Bogenberger, and their three children in Prien am Chiemsee.

== Filmography ==
- 2005: Marias's Last Journey – TV movie/tragicomedy, directed by Rainer Kaufmann
- 2007: Späte Aussicht – TV movie, directed by Sylvia Hoffmann
- 2010: In aller Stille – TV movie, directed by Rainer Kaufmann
- 2012: A Deal with Adele – TV movie, director: Xaver Schwarzenberger
- 2012: Mittlere Reife – TV movie, director: Martin Enlen
- 2013: Hattinger und die kalte Hand – Ein Chiemseekrimi – TV movie, director: Hans Steinbichler
- 2014: Die Frau aus dem Moor – TV movie, director: Christoph Stark
- 2017: Polizeiruf 110: Nachtdienst

== Awards ==
- Karl-Buchrucker-Preis for the screenplay of Marias's Last Journey
- Adolf-Grimme-Preis in Gold for the screenplay of Marias's Last Journey
- Banff Rockie Award for Marias's Last Journey as Best Television Film at the 27th Banff World Television Festival. Banff World Television Festival 2006
- Nomination for the Prix Europa 2005 (best screenplay) for Maria's Last Journey
- Special award for the screenplay of In aller Stille at the Fernsehfilm-Festival Baden-Baden 2010
- Grimme Prize 2011 for the screenplay of In aller Stille
