= Malik-Verlag =

Malik-Verlag logo.

Malik-Verlag (Ger: Der Malik-Verlag) was a German publishing house founded by Wieland Herzfelde, his brother John Heartfield, and George Grosz, and existed from 1916 to 1947. It primarily focused on political, anti-fascist, and avant-garde art as well as communist literature.

Its name derives from the novel Der Malik by Else Lasker-Schüler. In 1983, it was relaunched under the new name, Neuer Malik Verlag, by Thies Ziemke, however was sold to Piper Verlag in 1996 where it continued under the 'Malik Verlag' imprint. In 1944, having successfully gained a visa to America in 1939, he, in conjunction with others like Oskar Maria Graf, launched 'Aurora Verlag' as the successor.

The books published with Malik-Verlag were made popular due to their innovative dust jackets designed by John Heartfield who used the technique of photomontage and specially designed typefaces.

The books and materials of Malik-Verlag were notoriously part of the 1930s Nazi book burning campaigns.

== Publications ==
=== Magazines ===
- Neue Jugend (1916–1917)
- Everyone has their own football (1919)
- Die Pleite (1919–1920)
- Der Gegner (1919 to 1922)
- Neue deutsche Blätter (1933–1935)

=== Series ===
- Small revolutionary library (1920–1923)
- Red Novel Series (1921–1924)
- Collection of revolutionary stage works (1921–1923)
- Below and Above (1921–1923)
- The Fairy Tales of the Poor (1923–1924)
- Science and Society (1924)
- Malik Library (1924–1926)
