= Sankt Martin am Grimming =

- Former municipality
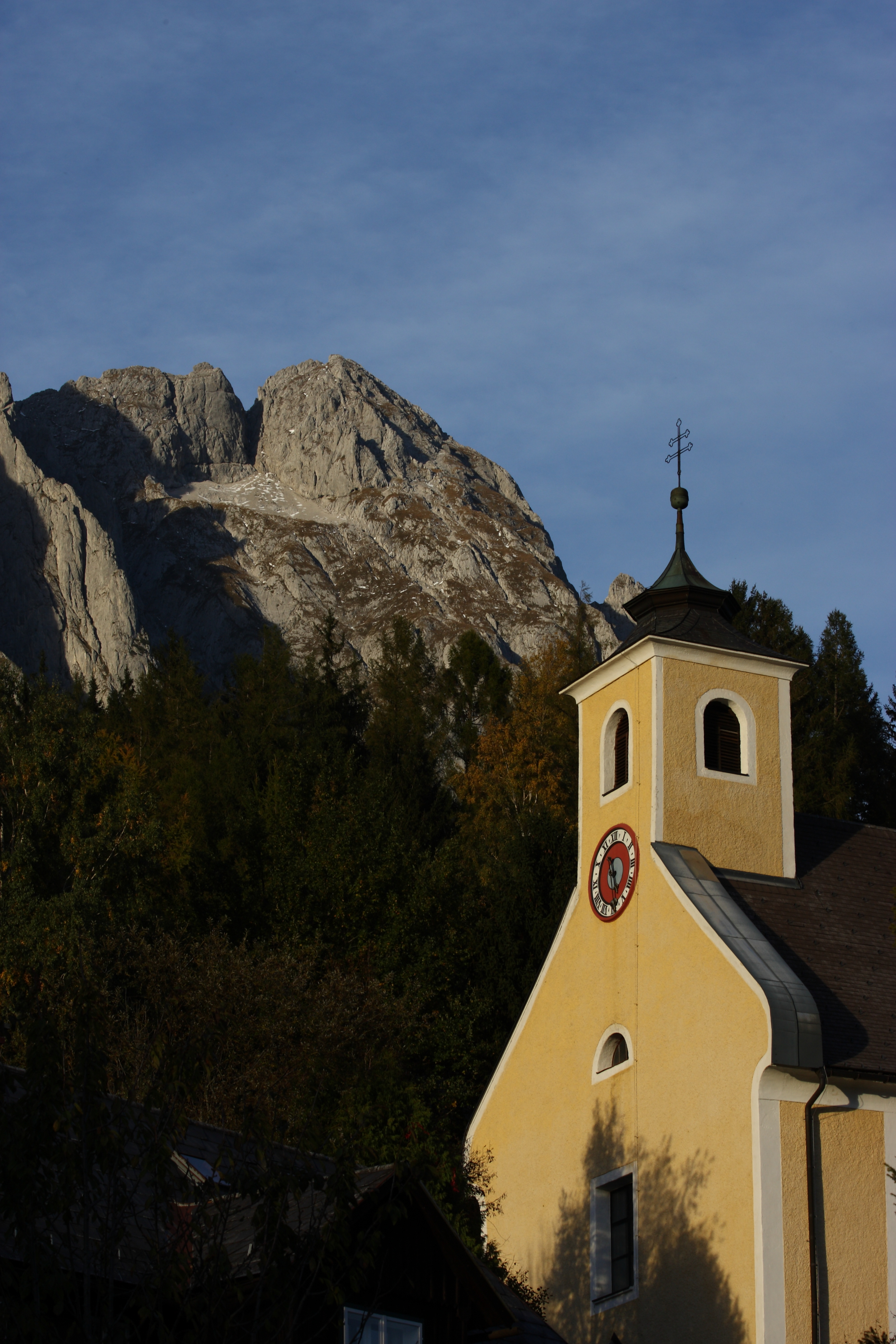
- Sankt Martin am Grimming parish church

- Coat of arms

- Location within Austria
- Coordinates: 47°29′20″N 13°58′55″E
- Country: Austria
- State: Styria
- District: Liezen

Area
  - Total: 37.62 km^{2} (14.53 sq mi)
- Elevation: 716 m (2,349 ft)

Population (1 January 2016)
  - Total: 774
  - Density: 20.6/km^{2} (53.3/sq mi)
- Time zone: UTC+1 (CET)
  - Summer (DST): UTC+2 (CEST)
- Postal code: 8954
- Area code: 03684
- Vehicle registration: GB
- Website: st-martin-grimming.steiermark.at

Sankt Martin am Grimming is a former municipality in the judicial district of Schladming in the Austrian state of Styria. In 2015 it merged with the municipality of Mitterberg to form the municipality of Mitterberg-St Martin.

== Geography ==
The municipality lies between Stainach and Gröbming in the Enns valley. It is 700m above sea level.
