= Fast wia im richtigen Leben =

- Starring: Gerhard Polt
- Country of origin: Germany

Fast wia im richtigen Leben is a German television series.

== See also ==
- List of German television series
