= Gerhard Polt =

German writer, filmmaker, actor and satirical cabaret artist (born 1942)

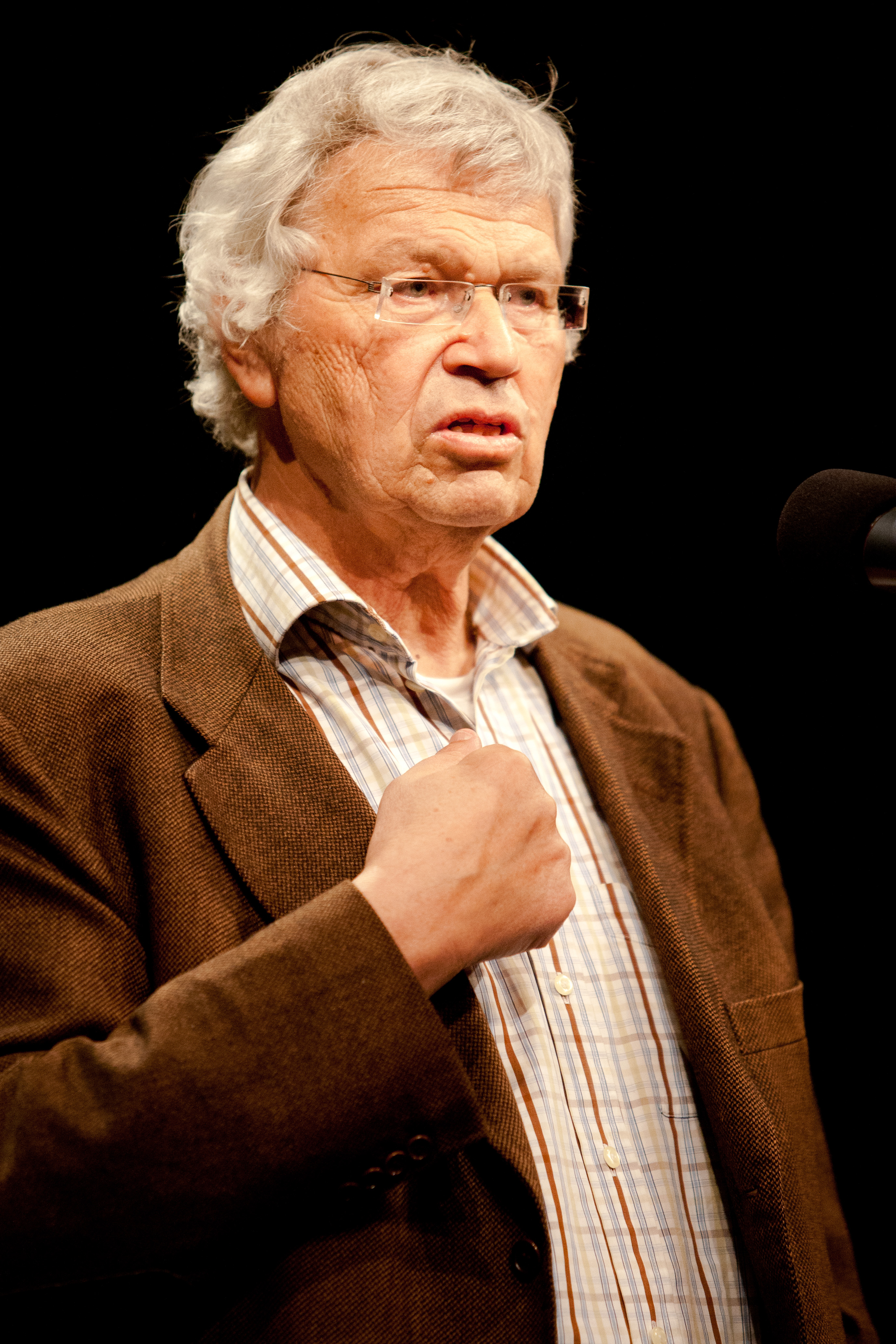
- Polt 2011
- Born: 7 May 1942 (age 84); Munich, Germany
- Occupations: author, filmmaker, cabaret artist
- Known for: Man spricht deutsh

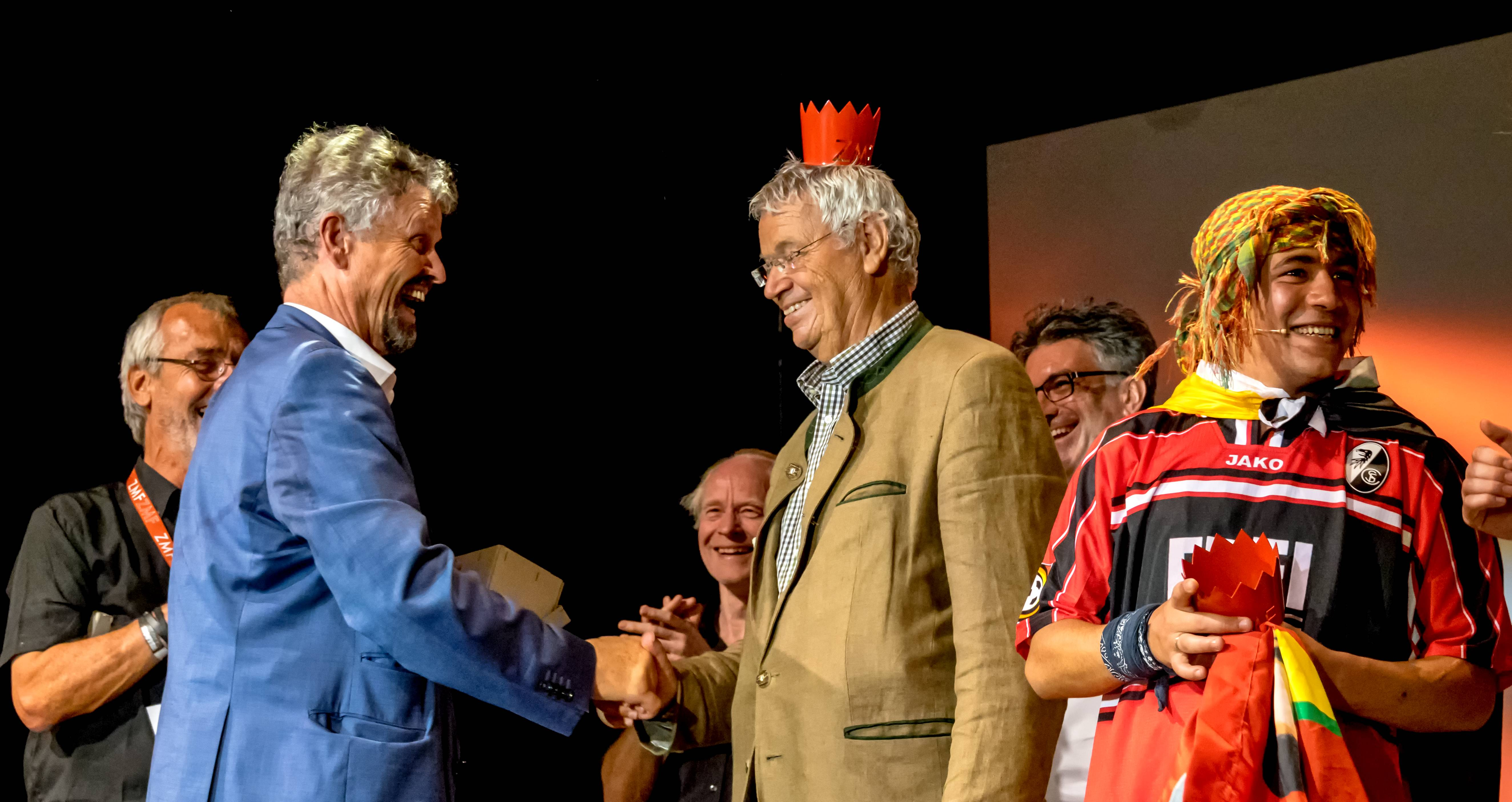
Awarding of honorary prices of the Zelt Musik Festival Freiburg, Germany 2015 by Gernot Erler (MdB)

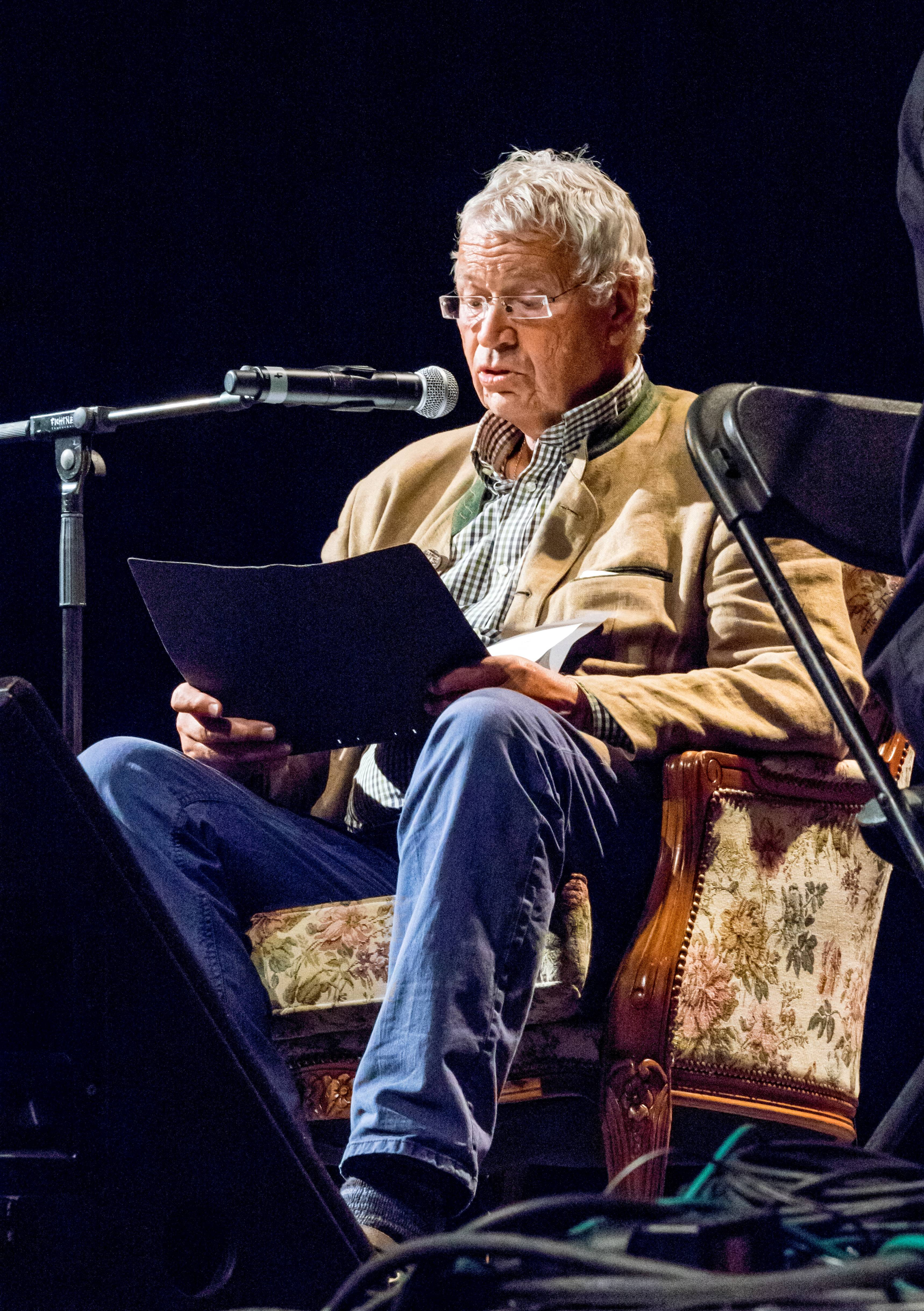
Zelt Musik Festival. Gerhard Polt reads Peter and the Wolf accompanied by the Russische Kammerphilharmonie St. Petersburg.

Gerhard Polt (born 7 May 1942 in Munich) is a German writer, filmmaker, actor and satirical cabaret artist from Bavaria.

Gerhard Polt's main topics are Bavarian people, culture and politics. On stage he often plays the role of an ignorant Bavarian petty bourgeoisie. One of his trademarks is the constant switching and the combining of Bavarian, Standard German and even (pseudo-) Englisch language elements (albeit always performed with strongly Bavarian pronunciation and melody), where a lot of jokes and wordplays derive from.

His performances in Munich theaters, which he started in 1976, are very popular. In 1979, he became known to a wider audience in West Germany as a result of his television comedy series Fast wia im richtigen Leben (Almost like in real life). In the following years, he was writer and actor in the movies Kehraus (1983), Man spricht deutsh [sic] [de] (1987), Germanikus [de] (2004), and writer and director of Herr Ober! [de] (1992).

He is known as one of the most regarded and highest decorated German cabaret artists.

== Awards (selection) ==
- 1980 Deutscher Kleinkunstpreis
- 1982 Adolf-Grimme-Preis
- 1984 Deutscher Darstellerpreis
- 2002 Prix Pantheon
- 2006 Kassel Literary Prize.
- 2017: Honorary Prize of the Bavarian minister-president at the Bavarian TV-Awards
- 2019 Cultural Honor Prize of the City of Munich
- 2021 Bavarian Order of Merit

== See also ==
- Biermösl Blosn
