= Peter Hamel =

German film director and screenwriter

Ellen Fechner
- Born: 7 December 1911; Mannheim, German Empire
- Died: 26 February 1979 (aged 67); Munich, Bavaria, West Germany
- Other name: Kurt Peter Hamel
- Occupations: Writer, Director
- Years active: 1948–1966 (film & TV)

Peter Hamel (1911–1979) was a German screenwriter and a director of film and television. He appeared as himself in the 1948 comedy Film Without a Title. He is the father of the composer Peter Michael Hamel.

== Selected filmography ==
- Film Without a Title (1948)
- Artists' Blood (1949)
- Oh, You Dear Fridolin (1952)
- The Daring Swimmer (1957)

== Bibliography ==
- Baer, Hester. Dismantling the Dream Factory: Gender, German Cinema, and the Postwar Quest for a New Film Language. Berghahn Books, 2012.
