= Helmut Dietl =

German film director and author

- Born: 22 June 1944; Bad Wiessee, Germany
- Died: 30 March 2015 (aged 70); Munich, Bavaria, Germany
- Occupations: Film director, author
- Years active: 1974–2015

Helmut Dietl (German: [ˈhɛl.muːt ˈdiːtl̩]; 22 June 1944 – 30 March 2015) was a German film director and author from Bad Wiessee.

== Work ==
After leaving grammar school in 1958, Dietl completed a degree in theatre studies and history of art. He then became head of photography and later assistant director to the Munich Kammerspiele theatre. He first achieved directorial success with the TV series Monaco Franze, eventually moving on to create several notable films with the aid of Patrick Süskind's writing.

In 1998, he was a member of the judging panel at the 48th Berlin International Film Festival.

He died in Munich on 30 March 2015.

== Selected filmography ==
TV series
Year	Title	Starring	Notes
1974–1975	Münchner Geschichten	Günther Maria Halmer (as Charlie Häusler)	
1979	Der ganz normale Wahnsinn	Towje Kleiner (as Maximilian Glanz)	
1983	Monaco Franze	Helmut Fischer (as Monaco Franze)	
1986	Kir Royal	Franz Xaver Kroetz (as Baby Schimmerlos)	

Film
Year	Title	Notes
1979	It Can Only Get Worse	A short edited version of Der ganz normale Wahnsinn
1992	Schtonk!	nominated for an Academy Award for Best Foreign Film
1997	Rossini	
1999	Late Show	
2005	About the Looking for and the Finding of Love	
2012	Zettl	

== Awards ==
- 1996 Bavarian Film Awards, Best Director
- 2013 Deutscher Filmpreis, lifetime achievement award
- 2014 Bambi Award, lifetime achievement award
