= Der Millionenbauer =

- Created by: Georg Tressler
- Starring: Walter Sedlmayr
- Country of origin: Germany
- No. of seasons: 2
- No. of episodes: 13

Production
- Running time: 45 minutes

Original release
- Network: Bayerischer Rundfunk, ARD
- Release: 1979 – 1987

Der Millionenbauer (The Millionaire) is a German television series.

== Plot summary ==
The German economic boom of the late 1970s led to an increase of land speculation; taking advantage of this, farmer Josef Hartinger makes a fortune selling his land, and gives up farming, living on the millions he'd earned. Deciding to help his children, he buys out their livelihoods: younger son Martin becomes a beverage distributor, whilst daughter Monica becomes a hairdresser with her own salon. His oldest son, Andreas, however, is a farmer, through and through, and, without any land to farm, he emigrates to Canada. Without Andreas's knowledge, however, his father buys him a farm.

Series two primarily concerns Josef Hartinger becoming a local politician, and running for the office of mayor.

== Production ==
Series one was shot on a farm in Anzing, in 1979; the second series was produced in 1986, and broadcast two years later on ARD. Though the cast remained the same, the filming location changed.

== Release ==
Pixis Medien released a DVD, containing all the episodes, on October 12, 2007.

== See also ==
- List of German television series
