= Ruth Maria Kubitschek =

German actress (1931–2024)

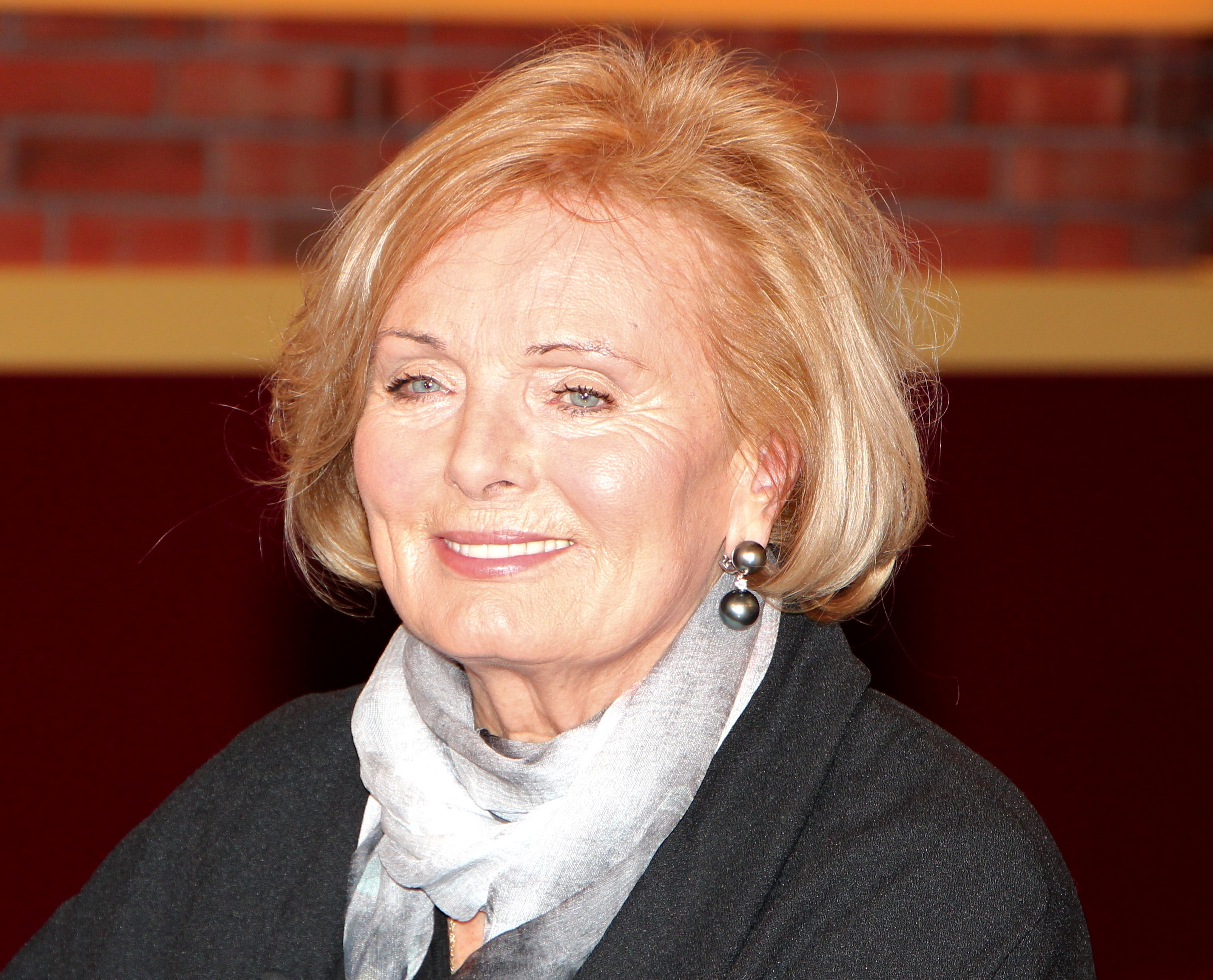
- Kubitschek in 2011
- Born: 2 August 1931; Komotau, Czechoslovakia (now Czech Republic)
- Died: 1 June 2024 (aged 92); Switzerland
- Occupations: Actress, author
- Years active: 1953–2013
- Spouse: Götz Friedrich (m. 1953; div. 1962)
- Partner(s): Wolfgang Rademann (1976–2016; his death)
- Children: 1 son

Signature
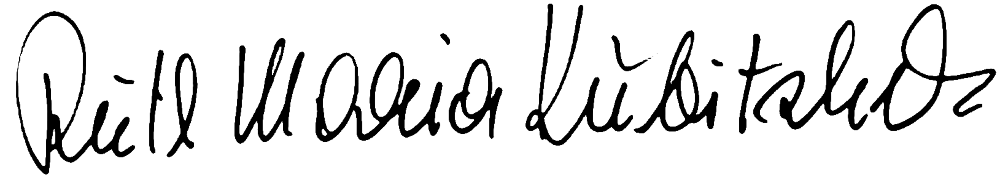

Ruth Maria Kubitschek (German: [ʁuːt ma.ˈʁiː.a ˈku.biː.t͡ʃɛk]; 2 August 1931 – 1 June 2024) was a German actress born in Czechoslovakia.

== Life ==
At the end of World War II her family fled to Köthen. Ruth Maria went to the University for Theater and Music (Hochschule für Theater und Musik) in Halle and then to the German Theater Institute (Deutsches Theater-Institut) in Weimar. Together with Götz Friedrich she had son Alexander (b. 1957). She was in a relationship with Wolfgang Rademann from 1976 to 2016.

In 2013, she shot her last film, the comedy Frau Ella. Thereafter she withdrew from the public eye, but still exhibited her paintings.

Kubitschek died in a hospital near Ascona, Switzerland on 1 June 2024, at the age of 92.

== Selected filmography ==
- Thomas Müntzer (1956)
- Lysistrata (1961)
- He Can't Stop Doing It (1962)
- Melissa (1966, TV miniseries)
- Sperrbezirk (1966)
- Ein Fall für Titus Bunge (1967, TV series)
- Midsummer Night (1967)
- Madame and Her Niece (1969)
- Moonlighting Mistress (1970)
- Tears of Blood (1972)
- Monaco Franze (1983, TV series)
- Crooks in Paradise (1985, TV film)
- Kir Royal (1986, TV series)
- Fatal Love (1986, TV film)
- Das Erbe der Guldenburgs (1987–1990, TV series)
- Freunde fürs Leben (1992–1996, TV series)
- Schloß Hohenstein (1992–1995, TV series)
- Katrin ist die Beste (1997, TV series)
- The Rose Gardener (2004, TV film)
- Das Traumhotel (2004–2006, 2014, TV series)
- Cinderella (2011, movie, Italy)
- Frau Ella (2013)

== Bibliography ==
- Goble, Alan. The Complete Index to Literary Sources in Film. Walter de Gruyter, 1999.
