= Monaco Franze – Der ewige Stenz =

- Created by: Helmut Dietl
- Starring: Helmut Fischer: Franz Münchinger; Ruth Maria Kubitschek: Annette von Soettingen; Karl Obermayr: Manfred „Manni“ Kopfeck; Christine Kaufmann: Olga Behrens; Erni Singerl: housekeeper Irmgard
- Country of origin: West Germany
- No. of seasons: 1
- No. of episodes: 10

Original release
- Network: Erstes Deutsches Fernsehen
- Release: 2 March – 11 May 1983

Monaco Franze – Der ewige Stenz is a German television series from 1982/83, set in Munich.

== Characters and general plot ==
The main character, the "ewige Stenz" ("eternal dandy"), is the 50-year-old Munich early-retired police detective and man-about-town Franz Münchinger. He is called "Monaco Franze" after the Italian name of Munich, Bavaria.

Münchinger, played by Helmut Fischer, lives with his wife Annette von Soettingen (Ruth Maria Kubitschek), an antiques shop owner, in Munich-Schwabing in happy marriage. He loves his city and he loves Annette, whom he affectionately calls "Spatzl". And Annette loves Monaco, even though she does come from a higher social class and regularly socialises with the likes of her, who all despise Monaco because of his apparent lack of education and cultural sophistication. This contrast often leads to humorous situations and dialogues, which are a common feature in the series.

Monaco also loves adventure and his greatest passion is the opposite sex. The driving plot of all episodes is Monaco putting great efforts in establishing and maintaining more or less stable relationships with other women, mostly younger ones, of which Annette is well aware. She endures this, knowing her husband truly loves her and only likes to play and cannot be tethered. His best friend Manfred "Manni" Kopfeck (Karl Obermayr), a former colleague, who still lives a dull life as civil servant, regularly assists his friend in an amusing way to set up these relationships and also to cover them up against Annette.

The series still enjoys great popularity, especially in Bavaria and even among younger viewers, due to the hilarious portrayal of the characters, the many references to Munich (places, restaurants etc.) and also the dialogues and quotes in Bavarian dialect, some of which have made it into everyday language.

== Episodes ==
1. Ein bissel was geht immer
2. Die italienische Angelegenheit
3. Kalt erwischt!
4. Der Friedensengel
5. Der Herr der sieben Meere
6. Mehr seelisch, verstehn's?
7. Ein ernsthafter älterer Herr
8. Macht's nur so weiter!
9. Wo ist das Leben noch lebenswert?
10. Abgestürzt

== See also ==
- List of German television series
