= Der ganz normale Wahnsinn =

German television series

- Created by: Helmut Dietl
- Starring: Towje Kleiner
- Country of origin: Germany

Der ganz normale Wahnsinn (English: The Normal Madness) is a German television series.

== See also ==
- List of German television series
