= Veronika Fitz =

German actress (1936–2020)

- Born: 28 March 1936; Dießen am Ammersee, Nazi Germany
- Died: 2 January 2020 (aged 83); Prien am Chiemsee, Germany
- Occupation: Actress
- Website: website

Veronika Fitz (28 March 1936 – 2 January 2020) was a German television actress.

She also had some solo-shows on the stage and produced a few singles.

Her daughter Ariela Bogenberger is a director and producer.

== Selected filmography ==
- The Vulture Wally (1956)
- The Spessart Inn (1958)
- The Haunted Castle (1960)
- Oh! This Bavaria! (1960)
- When Ludwig Goes on Manoeuvres (1967)
- Don't Get Angry (1972)
- Doctor Faustus (1982)
- In aller Stille (2010)
- Die Alpenklinik - Notfall für Dr. Guth (2011)
