= List of West German films of 1960 =

List of films produced in West Germany in 1960

List of West German films of 1960. Feature films produced and distributed in West Germany in 1960.

== 1960 ==
Title	Director	Cast	Genre	Notes
Agatha, Stop That Murdering!	Dietrich Haugk	Johanna von Koczian, Klausjürgen Wussow, Elisabeth Flickenschildt	Crime comedy	
The Ambassador	Harald Braun	Nadja Tiller, Hansjörg Felmy, James Robertson Justice	Drama	a.k.a. Die Botschafterin
The Avenger	Karl Anton	Heinz Drache, Ina Duscha, Ingrid van Bergen, Siegfried Schürenberg, Klaus Kinski	Mystery thriller	Based on Edgar Wallace
Beloved Augustin	Rolf Thiele	Matthias Fuchs, Walter Rilla, Veronika Bayer	Comedy	
The Black Sheep	Helmut Ashley	Heinz Rühmann, Siegfried Lowitz, Karl Schönböck, Maria Sebaldt, Lina Carstens	Mystery, Comedy	
Bombs on Monte Carlo	Georg Jacoby	Eddie Constantine, Marion Michael, Gunther Philipp	Comedy	
Boomerang	Alfred Weidenmann	Hardy Krüger, Martin Held, Mario Adorf, Horst Frank	Crime	a.k.a. Cry Double Cross
Brainwashed	Gerd Oswald	Curd Jürgens, Claire Bloom, Hansjörg Felmy, Mario Adorf	Drama	a.k.a. The Royal Game a.k.a. Schachnovelle
Brandenburg Division	Harald Philipp	Hanns Ernst Jäger, Wolfgang Reichmann, Heinz Weiss	War	
Die Brücke des Schicksals	Michael Kehlmann	Hannes Messemer	Thriller	
Burning Sands	Raphael Nussbaum	Daliah Lavi, Gert Günther Hoffmann	Adventure	Co-production with Israel
Carnival Confession	William Dieterle	Hans Söhnker, Götz George, Gitty Djamal, Christian Wolff, Rainer Brandt	Drama	a.k.a. Ash Wednesday Confession
Conny and Peter Make Music	Werner Jacobs	Cornelia Froboess, Peter Kraus	Musical	
The Crimson Circle	Jürgen Roland	Klausjürgen Wussow, Renate Ewert, Fritz Rasp, Eddi Arent	Mystery thriller	Based on Edgar Wallace
Crook and the Cross	Axel von Ambesser	Gert Fröbe, Karlheinz Böhm	Comedy	a.k.a. Der Gauner und der liebe Gott
Darkness Fell on Gotenhafen	Frank Wisbar	Sonja Ziemann, Gunnar Möller, Brigitte Horney	War, Disaster	
Do Not Send Your Wife to Italy	Hans Grimm	Marianne Hold, Elma Karlowa, Gerlinde Locker, Claus Biederstaedt, Harald Juhnke	Comedy	
The Fair	Wolfgang Staudte	Juliette Mayniel, Götz George, Wolfgang Reichmann	Drama, War	a.k.a. Kirmes
Faust	Peter Gorski	Will Quadflieg, Gustaf Gründgens	Drama	
Final Accord	Wolfgang Liebeneiner	Christian Marquand, Eleonora Rossi Drago, Viktor de Kowa	Drama, Music	Co-production with Italy and France
Final Destination: Red Lantern	Rudolf Jugert	Christine Görner, Joachim Fuchsberger, Klausjürgen Wussow, Werner Peters	Crime	
Freddy and the Melody of the Night	Wolfgang Schleif	Freddy Quinn, Heidi Brühl, Peter Carsten	Musical	
Gino	Ottomar Domnick	Jörg Pleva	Drama	
A Glass of Water	Helmut Käutner	Gustaf Gründgens, Liselotte Pulver, Sabine Sinjen, Hilde Krahl	Comedy	
The Good Soldier Schweik	Axel von Ambesser	Heinz Rühmann, Ernst Stankovski	Comedy, War	
Grounds for Divorce	Cyril Frankel	O. W. Fischer, Dany Robin, Violetta Ferrari	Comedy	
Gustav Adolf's Page	Rolf Hansen	Liselotte Pulver, Curd Jürgens, Ellen Schwiers	Historical	
The Haunted Castle	Kurt Hoffmann	Liselotte Pulver, Heinz Baumann, Georg Thomalla, Hans Clarin, Curt Bois	Comedy	
Headquarters State Secret	Paul May	Gert Fröbe, Klausjürgen Wussow, Karin Hübner, Ingeborg Schöner, Helmut Schmid, Peter Carsten, Hans Reiser, Siegfried Lowitz, Carl Lange	War	a.k.a. Soldatensender Calais
Heaven, Love and Twine	Ulrich Erfurth	Hartmut Reck, Grit Boettcher, Hannelore Schroth	Comedy	
Heldinnen	Dietrich Haugk	Marianne Koch, Johanna von Koczian, Paul Hubschmid, Walter Giller	Adventure	
The Hero of My Dreams	Arthur Maria Rabenalt	Heidi Brühl, Carlos Thompson, Maria Perschy, Peter Vogel	Comedy	
The High Life	Julien Duvivier	Giulietta Masina, Gert Fröbe, Gustav Knuth, Hannes Messemer	Comedy	a.k.a. The Artificial Silk Girl. Co-production with France and Italy
Hit Parade 1960	Franz Marischka	Renate Ewert, Vivi Bach	Musical	
Horrors of Spider Island	Fritz Böttger	Alexander D'Arcy, Barbara Valentin, Harald Maresch, Rainer Brandt	Horror	
I Aim at the Stars	J. Lee Thompson	Curd Jürgens, Victoria Shaw, Herbert Lom, Gia Scala	Biography, War, Science fiction	Co-production with the United States
I Learned That in Paris	Thomas Engel	Chris Howland, Christa Williams, Gisela Trowe	Comedy	
I Will Always Be Yours	Arno Assmann	Heidi Brühl, Hans Söhnker	Musical comedy	
Ich zähle täglich meine Sorgen	Paul Martin	Peter Alexander, Ingeborg Schöner, Gunther Philipp	Musical comedy	
Ingeborg	Wolfgang Liebeneiner	Ingrid Ernest, Dietmar Schönherr, Walter Giller	Comedy	
Island of the Amazons	Otto Meyer	Adrian Hoven, Ann Smyrner	Adventure	a.k.a. Seven Daring Girls
Juanito	Fernando Palacios	Pablito Calvo, Hans von Borsody, Sabine Bethmann, Georg Thomalla	Family, Adventure	Co-production with Spain
The Juvenile Judge	Paul Verhoeven	Heinz Rühmann, Karin Baal	Drama	a.k.a. Judge and Juvenile a.k.a. The Judge and the Sinner
The Last Pedestrian	Wilhelm Thiele	Heinz Erhardt, Christine Kaufmann, Käthe Haack	Comedy	
The Last Witness	Wolfgang Staudte	Martin Held, Hanns Lothar, Ellen Schwiers	Courtroom drama	a.k.a. Der letzte Zeuge
Marina	Paul Martin	Rocco Granata, Giorgia Moll, Bubi Scholz	Musical	
Mistress of the World	William Dieterle	Martha Hyer, Micheline Presle, Carlos Thompson, Sabu, Gino Cervi, Lino Ventura, Wolfgang Preiss, Valerij Inkijinoff	Science fiction, Spy thriller	Co-production with France and Italy. A remake of the silent film by Joe May
Mrs. Warren's Profession	Ákos Ráthonyi	Lilli Palmer, O. E. Hasse, Johanna Matz	Drama	Co-production with Switzerland
My Schoolfriend	Robert Siodmak	Heinz Rühmann, Loni von Friedl, Hertha Feiler	Drama, War	
The Mystery of the Green Spider	Franz Marischka	Adrian Hoven, Renate Ewert, Hans von Borsody	Musical crime	
The Nabob Affair	Ralph Habib	O. E. Hasse, Paul Guers, Perrette Pradier, Sonja Ziemann	Crime comedy	Co-production with France
Officer Factory	Frank Wisbar	Helmut Griem, Horst Frank, Carl Lange	War	
Oh! This Bavaria!	Arnulf Schröder	Rudolf Vogel, Liesl Karlstadt	Comedy	
Oriental Nights	Heinz Paul	Marina Petrova, Pero Alexander, Barbara Laage, Reinhard Kolldehoff	Crime	
Painted Youth	Max Nosseck	Christian Wolff, Christian Doermer, Rieke Ramoff, Hans Nielsen, Ernst Jacobi	Drama	a.k.a. Geschminkte Jugend (1960, not approved by the FSK). a.k.a. Die Nacht am See (1963, re-edited version). Original version released in 1988
Pension Schöller	Georg Jacoby	Theo Lingen, Christa Williams, Ann Smyrner	Comedy	
The Red Hand	Kurt Meisel	Paul Hubschmid, Hannes Messemer, Eleonora Rossi Drago	Spy drama	
Satan Tempts with Love	Rudolf Jugert	Belinda Lee, Ivan Desny, Joachim Hansen, Heinz Engelmann	Crime	Co-production with France
Der Schleier fiel	Paul May	Hartmut Reck, Vera Tschechowa, Karl Lieffen	Drama	
Stage Fright	Kurt Hoffmann	Dunja Movar, Elke Sommer, Bernhard Wicki, Antje Weisgerber, Claus Wilcke, Gitty Djamal, Michael Hinz	Drama	a.k.a. Lampenfieber
Stefanie in Rio	Curtis Bernhardt	Carlos Thompson, Sabine Sinjen	Comedy	
Storm in a Water Glass	Josef von Báky	Ingrid Andree, Hanns Lothar, Therese Giehse	Comedy	
Strafbataillon 999	Harald Philipp	Werner Peters, Heinz Weiss, Hanns Ernst Jäger, Georg Lehn, Ernst Schröder, Sonja Ziemann	War	a.k.a. Punishment Battalion
Sweetheart of the Gods	Gottfried Reinhardt	Ruth Leuwerik, Peter van Eyck, Harry Meyen	Biography	
The Terrible People	Harald Reinl	Joachim Fuchsberger, Karin Dor, Elisabeth Flickenschildt, Fritz Rasp, Eddi Arent	Mystery thriller	Based on Edgar Wallace
The Thousand Eyes of Dr. Mabuse	Fritz Lang	Dawn Addams, Peter van Eyck, Gert Fröbe, Wolfgang Preiss, Werner Peters	Thriller	Co-production with France and Italy
The True Jacob	Rudolf Schündler	Willy Millowitsch, Renate Ewert	Comedy	
Twenty Brave Men	Edwin Zbonek	Marisa Mell, Sieghardt Rupp, Carl Wery, Annie Rosar, Bert Fortell, Paul Esser	War, Drama	a.k.a. 20 Brave Men a.k.a. Love Hangs on the Gibbet a.k.a. Am Galgen hängt die Liebe
Until Money Departs You	Alfred Vohrer	Luise Ullrich, Gert Fröbe	Drama	
We Cellar Children	Hans-Joachim Wiedermann	Wolfgang Neuss, Karin Baal, Ingrid van Bergen, Jo Herbst, Wolfgang Gruner, Achim Strietzel, Ralf Wolter	Comedy	
We Will Never Part	Harald Reinl	Adrian Hoven, Vivi Bach, Nadja Regin	Musical comedy	
Weit ist der Weg	Wolfgang Schleif	Freddy Quinn, Ingeborg Schöner, Anneli Sauli, Leon Askin, Dionísio Azevedo, Eugênio Kusnet, Antônio Pitanga, Rosamaria Murtinho	Musical, Adventure	
When the Heath Is in Bloom	Hans Deppe	Joachim Hansen, Veronika Bayer	Drama	
The White Horse Inn	Werner Jacobs	Peter Alexander, Waltraut Haas	Musical	Co-production with Austria
Willy the Private Detective	Rudolf Schündler	Willy Millowitsch	Comedy	
The Woman by the Dark Window	Franz Peter Wirth	Marianne Koch, Heinz Drache, Christiane Nielsen, Robert Graf	Drama	
A Woman for Life	Wolfgang Liebeneiner	Ruth Leuwerik, Klausjürgen Wussow, Harry Meyen	Musical	
You Don't Shoot at Angels	Rolf Thiele	Ruth Leuwerik, Hannes Messemer, Ilse Steppat	Comedy	
The Young Sinner	Rudolf Jugert	Karin Baal, Vera Tschechowa	Drama	a.k.a. Die junge Sünderin
Die zornigen jungen Männer	Wolf Rilla	Hansjörg Felmy, Horst Frank, Joachim Fuchsberger, Dawn Addams, Hans Nielsen	Drama	a.k.a. The Angry Young Men

== Documentaries and television films ==
Title	Director	Cast	Genre	Notes
The Captain from Köpenick	Rainer Wolffhardt	Rudolf Platte, Werner Peters, Eva Ingeborg Scholz	Comedy	a.k.a. The Captain of Köpenick
A Christmas Carol	Franz Josef Wild	Carl Wery	Fantasy	a.k.a. Ein Weihnachtslied in Prosa
Claudia	Franz Reichert	Cordula Trantow, Helmuth Lohner, Heli Finkenzeller	Comedy	
The Crucible	Ludwig Cremer	Hans Christian Blech, Paul Dahlke, Ernst Fritz Fürbringer, Brigitte Grothum	Drama	
Die Dame in der schwarzen Robe	Peter Zadek	Margot Trooger, Harald Leipnitz, Kurt Ehrhardt	Crime	a.k.a. The Second Man
Dr. Knock	Walter Henn	Richard Münch	Comedy	
Einer von Sieben	John Olden	Hans Söhnker, Richard Münch, Benno Sterzenbach, Reinhard Kolldehoff	Drama, War	
Die erste Mrs. Selby	Hans Quest	Hans Söhnker, Susanne von Almassy, Gerlinde Locker, Karl Schönböck	Comedy	Based on The First Mrs. Fraser
Fährten	Michael Kehlmann	Ullrich Haupt, Elfriede Kuzmany, Hans Clarin	Drama	
Der Fehltritt	Paul Verhoeven	Hanns Ernst Jäger	Comedy	a.k.a. The Misstep
Ein Fingerhut voll Mut	Peter Beauvais	Christian Doermer, Sigfrit Steiner	Drama	a.k.a. All You Young Lovers
Gaslight	Wilm ten Haaf	Margot Trooger, Dieter Borsche	Thriller	
Der Geizige	Ulrich Lauterbach	Joseph Offenbach, Folker Bohnet, Ernst Stankovski	Comedy	a.k.a. The Miser
The Graveyard	Rolf Hädrich	René Deltgen	Drama	a.k.a. Die Friedhöfe
The Great Rage of Philip Hotz	Paul Verhoeven	Robert Graf	Comedy	
Der Groß-Cophta	Hans Lietzau	Viktor de Kowa, Gisela Uhlen, Hartmut Reck, Alexander Kerst	Comedy	
Happy Birthday	Imo Moszkowicz	Hannelore Schroth, Klausjürgen Wussow, Christiane Maybach, Gerda Maurus	Comedy	a.k.a. Zum Geburtstag
The Human Voice	Franz Josef Wild	Hildegard Knef	Drama	a.k.a. Die geliebte Stimme
Ich fand Julia Harrington	William Dieterle	Lil Dagover, Rolf Henniger, Ingmar Zeisberg, Werner Finck	Drama	a.k.a. The Playwright and the Stars
The Imaginary Invalid	Michael Kehlmann	Carl-Heinz Schroth, Chariklia Baxevanos, Brigitte Grothum, Hartmut Reck, Hans Clarin	Comedy	a.k.a. Der eingebildete Kranke a.k.a. The Hypochondriac
Incident at Twilight	Rudolf Noelte	Ernst Schröder, Friedrich Maurer	Crime	a.k.a. One Autumn Evening
The Lady's Not for Burning	Edward Rothe	Helmut Schmid, Agnes Fink, Ernst Jacobi, Cordula Trantow, Hartmut Reck	Comedy	
The Land of Promise	Otto Kurth	Inge Langen, Max Eckard, Siegfried Wischnewski	Drama	a.k.a. Das Land der Verheißung
Madame Sans-Gêne	John Olden	Inge Meysel, Karl John, Richard Häussler, Friedrich Joloff	Comedy	
Majestäten	Willi Schmidt	O. E. Hasse	Comedy	a.k.a. La Foire d'empoigne a.k.a. Catch as Catch Can
The Man Who Was Thursday	Fritz Umgelter	Heinz Weiss, Alexander Kerst, Fritz Rasp	Thriller	a.k.a. Der Mann, der Donnerstag war
Mein Kampf	Erwin Leiser		Documentary, War	Co-production with Sweden
Das Missverständnis	Hermann Pfeiffer	Kurt Großkurth, Ernst Stankovski	Comedy	a.k.a. Oscar
Nach all der Zeit	Hans Lietzau	Wolfgang Lukschy, Willy Maertens, Blandine Ebinger, Dietmar Schönherr, Michael Hinz	Comedy	a.k.a. Echo from Afar
On Borrowed Time	Wilhelm Semmelroth	Carl Wery, Richard Münch, Blandine Ebinger, Wolfgang Büttner	Fantasy	a.k.a. Der Tod im Apfelbaum
Das Paradies	Hans Quest	Volker Lechtenbrink, Loni von Friedl	Drama	
Paris, 20. Juli	Hans Schweikart	Bernhard Minetti, Dieter Borsche	War	a.k.a. Treason
The Police	Gerhard Overhoff	Hans Helmut Dickow, Siegfried Wischnewski	Black comedy	
Room Service	Rolf Hädrich	Martin Hirthe, Heinz Moog	Comedy	a.k.a. Bedienung, bitte!
Shadow of Heroes	Michael Kehlmann	Hannes Messemer, Elfriede Kuzmany, Karl John	Drama	
So ist es – Ist es so?	Hans-Reinhard Müller	Peter Capell, Pinkas Braun, Mila Kopp, Horst Tappert	Drama	a.k.a. Right You Are! (If You Think So)
Die Stunde der Antigone	Fritz Schröder-Jahn	Luitgard Im, Werner Hinz, Maria Emo	Drama	
Time and the Conways	John Olden	Inge Meysel, Maria Emo, Hans Reiser, Ingeborg Körner, Paul Edwin Roth, Cordula Trantow, Katharina Matz, Jürgen Goslar	Drama	
Der Traum des Mr. Borton	Anton Schelkopf	Leon Askin, Ann Smyrner, Heinz Weiss, Günter Pfitzmann	Crime	
The Trial of Mary Dugan	Falk Harnack	Anaid Iplicjian, Hartmut Reck, Jürgen Goslar, Ingrid van Bergen	Crime	a.k.a. Der Prozeß Mary Dugan a.k.a. Der Prozess Mary Dugan
Der Untergang der "Freiheit"	Hanns Farenburg	Alfred Schieske, Heinz Reincke	Drama	
Venus Observed	Peter Beauvais	Anton Walbrook, Karin Hübner	Comedy	a.k.a. Venus im Licht
The Voice of the Turtle	Paul Verhoeven	Hanns Lothar, Brigitte Grothum	Comedy	a.k.a. Das Lied der Taube
Waldhausstraße 20	John Olden	Antje Weisgerber, Hellmut Lange, Richard Münch, Robert Freitag, Friedrich Domin	Drama, War	
Wer überlebt, ist schuldig	Rolf Hädrich	Inge Stolten, Max Eckard	Drama	
Wovon wir leben und woran wir sterben	Oswald Döpke	Gisela von Collande, Wolfgang Lukschy	Drama	

== Bibliography ==
- Davidson, John & Hake, Sabine. Framing the Fifties: Cinema in a Divided Germany. Berghahn Books, 2007.

== See also ==
- List of Austrian films of 1960
- List of East German films of 1960
