= Royal Highness (novel) =

1909 novel by Thomas Mann

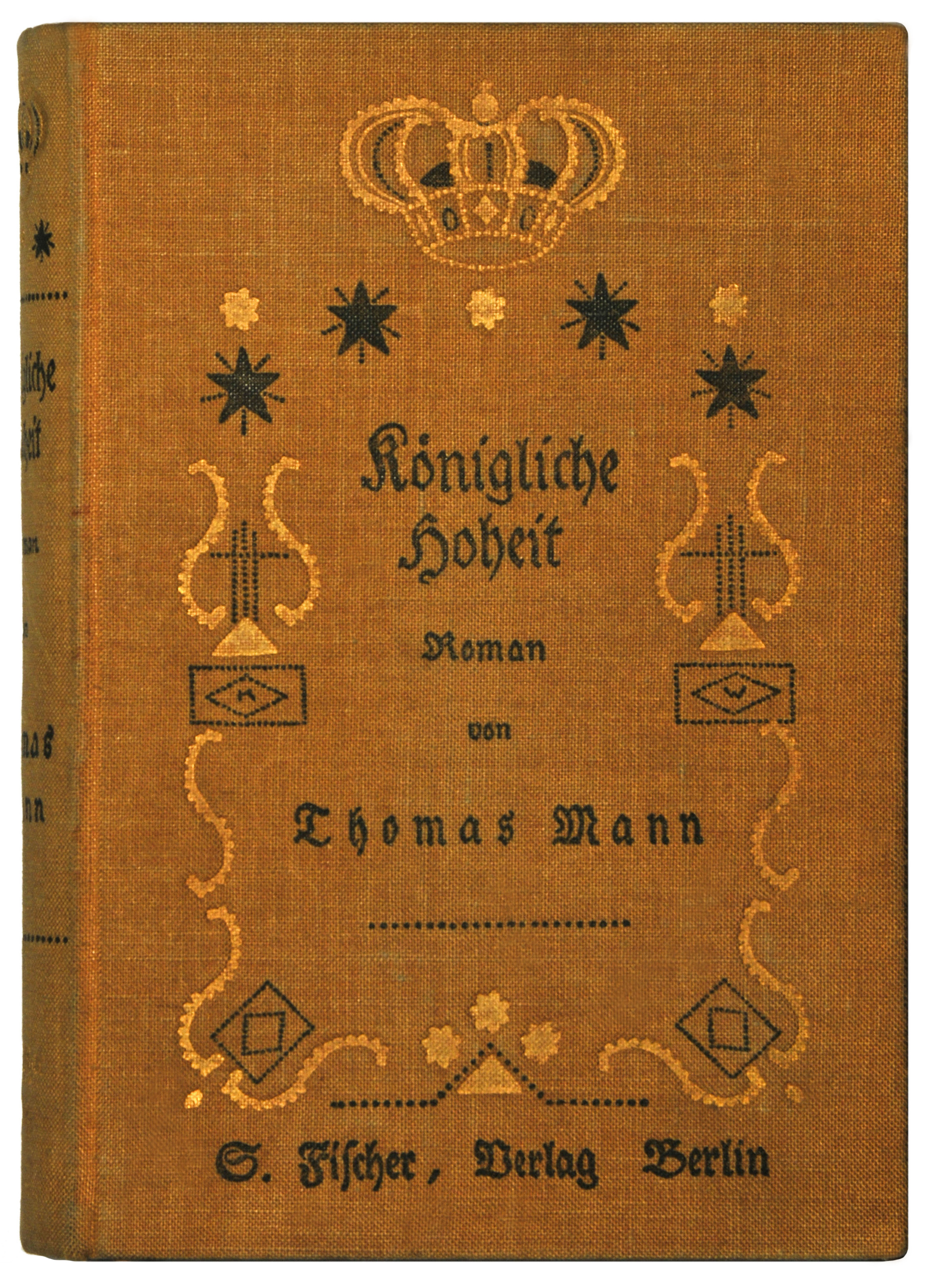
- First edition cover
- Author: Thomas Mann
- Original title: Königliche Hoheit
- Translator: A. Cecil Curtis
- Language: German
- Genre: Historical fiction
- Publisher: S. Fischer Verlag, Berlin
- Publication date: 1909
- Publication place: Germany
- English publication date: 1916 (Knopf)
- Media type: Print
- Pages: 475
- Text: Royal Highness at Wikisource

Royal Highness (German: Königliche Hoheit) is a 1909 novel by Thomas Mann. It is Mann's second novel and was written between the summer of 1906 and February 1909.

Royal Highness is characterized by its fairytale-like qualities. The novel describes a young unworldly and dreamy prince who forces himself into a marriage of convenience that ultimately becomes happy, and was modeled after Mann's own romance and marriage to Katia Mann in February 1905.

First published in 1909 in Die neue Rundschau, the novel was met with great enthusiasm from the public. However, it was met with a more divided reception from critics.

== Film adaptation ==
In 1953, the novel was adapted into film by Hans Abich and Rolf Thiele under the same title, Königliche Hoheit. Directed by Harald Braun, it was produced in the studios of Filmaufbau GmbH Göttingen in Agfacolor. The main characters were portrayed by Dieter Borsche, Ruth Leuwerik and Lil Dagover. Thomas Mann's daughter, Erika Mann, played a small role in the film.
