= Friederike von Barring =

1956 film

- Directed by: Rolf Thiele
- Written by: Rolf Thiele
- Based on: Die Enkel by William von Simpson
- Produced by: Hans Abich; Rolf Thiele
- Starring: Nadja Tiller; Carl Raddatz; Martin Held
- Cinematography: Werner Krien
- Edited by: Erwin Marno
- Music by: Friedrich Meyer
- Production company: Filmaufbau
- Distributed by: Deutsche London-Film
- Release date: 17 August 1956
- Running time: 99 minutes
- Country: West Germany
- Language: German

Friederike von Barring is a 1956 West German drama film directed by Rolf Thiele and starring Nadja Tiller, Carl Raddatz and Martin Held. It was shot at the Göttingen Studios with sets were designed by the art director Walter Haag. The premiered at the Marmorhaus in West Berlin. It is a sequel to the 1955 film The Barrings and takes place at the time of the Weimar Republic.

== Cast ==
- Nadja Tiller as Friederike 'Fritzi' von Barring
- Carl Raddatz as Archibald 'Archi' von Barring
- Martin Held as Falkenstein
- Dietmar Schönherr as Müller-Staen jr.
- Hilde Weissner as Frau von Barring
- Tilo von Berlepsch as Emanuel von Eyff
- Klaus Behrendt as Inspektor Klaus
- Nora Hagist as Mathilde von Barring
- Evi Kent as Olly Saretzky
- Dieter Straub as Otto von Barring
- Margitta Sonke as Hannelore von Barring

== Bibliography ==
- Bock, Hans-Michael & Bergfelder, Tim. The Concise CineGraph. Encyclopedia of German Cinema. Berghahn Books, 2009.
- Sobotka, Jens U. Die Filmwunderkinder: Hans Abich und die Filmaufbau GmbH Göttingen. 1999
