= Regina Amstetten =

1954 film

- German film poster
- Directed by: Kurt Neumann
- Written by: Ernst Wiechert (story); Kurt E. Walter
- Produced by: Luggi Waldleitner
- Starring: Luise Ullrich; Carl Raddatz; Carl Esmond
- Cinematography: Werner Krien
- Edited by: Elisabeth Kleinert-Neumann
- Music by: Lothar Brühne
- Production company: Roxy Film
- Distributed by: Deutsche Film Hansa
- Release date: 2 February 1954
- Running time: 98 minutes
- Country: West Germany
- Language: German

Regina Amstetten is a 1954 West German drama film directed by Kurt Neumann and starring Luise Ullrich, Carl Raddatz, and Carl Esmond.

The film's sets were designed by the art director Gabriel Pellon. It was shot at the Göttingen Studios.

== Cast ==
- Luise Ullrich as Regina Amstetten
- Carl Raddatz as Von Freyberg
- Carl Esmond as Prof. Werner Grüter
- Paul Hartmann as Pastor Fehrmann
- Harry Meyen as Jürgen von Bredow
- Fritz Matthies as Kersten von Bredow
- Dinah Hinz as Hanna von Bredow
- Klaus-Jürgen Lenke as Werner
- Hans Hermann Schaufuß as Dr. Mahnke
- Arno Paulsen as Herr Schirrwind
- Erich Dunskus as Ewald
- Erna Sellmer as Maria
- Franz Schafheitlin as Hotelportier Mohr
- Paul Bildt as Dr. Wiegand
- Herbert Hübner as Chairman of the Medical Congress
- Hans Stiebner as Chairman of the Business Travel
