= The Barrings =

1955 film by Rolf Thiele

- Dieter Borsche and Nadja Tiller
- Directed by: Rolf Thiele
- Written by: William von Simpson (novel); Felix Lützkendorf; Rolf Thiele
- Produced by: Luggi Waldleitner
- Starring: Dieter Borsche; Nadja Tiller; Paul Hartmann
- Cinematography: Günther Anders
- Edited by: Alexandra Anatra
- Music by: Friedrich Meyer
- Production company: Roxy Film
- Distributed by: Deutsche London-Film
- Release date: 27 October 1955
- Running time: 107 minutes
- Country: West Germany
- Language: German

The Barrings (German: Die Barrings) is a 1955 West German historical drama film directed by Rolf Thiele and starring Dieter Borsche, Nadja Tiller and Paul Hartmann. It was shot at the Göttingen Studios with sets designed by the art director Walter Haag. It was followed by a sequel Friederike von Barring in 1956.

== Cast ==
- Dieter Borsche as Fried von Barring
- Nadja Tiller as Gerda von Eyff
- Paul Hartmann as Archibald von Barring
- Sonja Sutter as Gisa von Eyff
- Heinz Hilpert as Baron von Eyff
- Jan Hendriks as Graf Wilda
- Lil Dagover as Thilde von Barring
- Olga Chekhova as Amelie von Eyff
- Ida Wüst as Tante Ulrike
- Tilo von Berlepsch as Emanuel von Eyff
- Ernst von Klipstein as Dr. Bremer
- Erik von Loewis as Hofrat Herbst
- Benno Hoffmann as Gutsinspektor Barbknecht
- Friedmar Apel as Malte mit 4 Jahren
- Hartmut Apel as Malte mit 2 Jahren
- Eugen Bergen as Arnoldi
- Gerhard Holleschek as Lachmanski, Kaufmann
- Hartmut Krüger as Archie mit 8 Jahren
- Burghard Ortgies as Archie mit 4 Jahren
- Andrea Schoder as Wirtschafterin Charlotte

== Bibliography ==
- Bock, Hans-Michael & Bergfelder, Tim. The Concise CineGraph. Encyclopedia of German Cinema. Berghahn Books, 2009.
