= Love '47 =

1949 film

- Directed by: Wolfgang Liebeneiner
- Written by: Wolfgang Borchert (play); Kurt Joachim Fischer; Wolfgang Liebeneiner
- Produced by: Hans Abich; Curt Prickler
- Starring: Dieter Horn; Hilde Krahl; Sylvia Schwarz; Karl John
- Cinematography: Franz Weihmayr
- Edited by: Walter von Bonhorst
- Music by: Hans-Martin Majewski
- Production company: Filmaufbau
- Distributed by: Panorama-Film
- Release date: 7 March 1949
- Running time: 118 minutes
- Country: Germany
- Language: German

Love '47 (German: Liebe 47) is a 1949 German drama film directed by Wolfgang Liebeneiner and starring Dieter Horn, Hilde Krahl and Sylvia Schwarz. It was part of the cycle of rubble films made in post-war Germany. A young man and a woman about to commit suicide by jumping into a river, recount to each other their experiences of the Second World War and the struggles of the immediate post-war situation. Eventually they convince each other that life is worth living after all.

The film was shot at the Göttingen Studios with sets designed by the art director Walter Haag. It was partly based on the play Draußen vor der Tür by Wolfgang Borchert, with many extra scenes showing the experience of a woman on the home front whereas the original stage work had concentrated only on the perspectives of soldiers coming home. The film is particularly notable for its sympathetic treatment of its female protagonist.

== Cast ==
- Dieter Horn as Jürgen Gehrke
- Hilde Krahl as Anna Gehrke
- Sylvia Schwarz as Monika Gehrke
- Karl John as Beckmann
- Erika Müller as Lisa Beckmann
- Hedwig Wangel as Mutter Beckmann
- Grethe Weiser as Frau Puhlmann
- Luise Franke-Booch as Frau Kramer
- Albert Florath as Unternehmer
- Erich Ponto as Alter Mann
- Hubert von Meyerinck as Direktor Engelbrecht
- Paul Hoffmann as Oberst
- Leonore Esdar as Frau des Obersts
- Gisela Burghardt as Tochter des Oberst
- Herbert Tiede as Schwiegersohn des Obersts
- Leopold von Ledebur as General
- Heinz Klevenow as Ein Panzermann
- Rudolf Kalvius as Von Wehrzahn
- Helmuth Rudolph as Alfred
- Kurt A. Jung as Peter
- Erwin Geschonneck as Kriminalbeamter
- Inge Meysel as Betty aus Berlin
- Alice Verden as Tante Eva
- Tilo von Berlepsch as Vetter Fritz

== Bibliography ==
- Shandley, Robert R. Rubble Films: German Cinema in the Shadow of the Third Reich. Temple University Press, 2001.
