= Night of Decision =

1956 film

- Directed by: Falk Harnack
- Written by: Charles Cordier; Werner Jörg Lüddecke
- Produced by: Hans Abich; Rolf Thiele
- Starring: Carl Raddatz; Hilde Krahl; Albert Lieven
- Cinematography: Friedl Behn-Grund
- Edited by: Kurt Zeunert
- Music by: Hans-Martin Majewski
- Production company: Filmaufbau
- Distributed by: Schorcht Filmverleih
- Release date: 19 January 1956
- Running time: 102 minutes
- Country: West Germany
- Language: German

Night of Decision (German: Nacht der Entscheidung) is a 1956 West German drama film directed by Falk Harnack and starring Carl Raddatz, Hilde Krahl and Albert Lieven. It was shot at Göttingen Studios and on location in Belgium. The film's sets were designed by the art directors Walter Haag.

== Synopsis ==
After ten years as a prisoner of war in Siberia, a Belgian industrialist returns home to find that he has been declared dead and his wife has remarried.

== Cast ==
- Carl Raddatz as René Dobersin
- Hilde Krahl as Claire Vernon
- Albert Lieven as Albert Vernon
- Ernst Schröder as Jacques Ardent
- Gisela Tantau as Monique Dobersin
- Harry Meyen as Philip Ardent
- Alfred Schieske as André
- Joseph Offenbach as Smozik
- Hans Hessling as Jules
- Fritz Rémond Jr. as Professor Mareau
- Maria Sebaldt as Penny
- Paul Günther as Matthieu
- Gerd E. Schäfer as Piet van Hoek
- Karl Meixner as Francois
- Rudolf Kalvius as Dr. Fabre
- Alwin Woesthoff as gardener
- Arthur Mentz as head-workman
- Jenny Lattermann as girl
- Benno Hoffmann as guarding soldier

== Bibliography ==
- Bock, Hans-Michael & Bergfelder, Tim. The Concise CineGraph. Encyclopedia of German Cinema. Berghahn Books, 2009.
