= The Ambassador (1960 film) =

1960 film

- Theatrical film poster
- German: Die Botschafterin
- Directed by: Harald Braun
- Written by: Harald Braun; Rolf Thiele; Hans Wolfgang (novel)
- Produced by: Hans Abich; Manfred Kercher; Rolf Thiele
- Starring: Nadja Tiller; Hansjörg Felmy; James Robertson Justice
- Cinematography: Friedl Behn-Grund
- Edited by: Caspar van den Berg
- Music by: Werner Eisbrenner
- Production company: Filmaufbau
- Distributed by: Neue Filmverleih
- Release date: 16 September 1960
- Running time: 114 minutes
- Country: West Germany
- Language: German

The Ambassador (German: Die Botschafterin) is a 1960 West German drama film directed by Harald Braun and starring Nadja Tiller, Hansjörg Felmy and James Robertson Justice. It was shot at the Göttingen Studios. The film's sets were designed by the art directors Fritz Maurischat, Arno Richter and Hermann Warm.

== Cast ==
- Nadja Tiller as Helen Cuttler
- Hansjörg Felmy as Jan Möller
- James Robertson Justice as Robert Morrison
- Irene von Meyendorff as Ruth Ryan
- Günther Schramm as Jim Cowler
- Joseph Offenbach as Monsieur Labiche
- Ilse Trautschold
- Harald Maresch as Burgsteller
- Martin Berliner as Bill Clark
- Brigitte Rau as Dorothy, secretary
- Hans Leibelt as President of the Republic
- Eva Pflug as Miss Caldwell
- Walter Tarrach as Protokollchef
- Ingeborg Wellmann
- Käte Alving
- Heinz Spitzner
- Hans Paetsch
- Wilhelm Borchert as minister of foreign affairs
