= A Day Will Come (1950 film) =

1950 film directed by Rudolf Jugert

- Herbert Hübner and Maria Schell in a scene from the film
- German: Es kommt ein Tag
- Directed by: Rudolf Jugert
- Written by: Ernst Penzoldt (novella); Hans Abich; Rolf Thiele; Thea von Harbou; Fritz Grasshoff
- Produced by: Hans Abich; Rolf Thiele
- Starring: Dieter Borsche; Maria Schell; Lil Dagover
- Cinematography: Igor Oberberg
- Edited by: Erwin Marno
- Music by: Norbert Schultze
- Production company: Filmaufbau
- Distributed by: Schorcht Filmverleih
- Release date: 17 October 1950
- Running time: 91 minutes
- Country: West Germany
- Language: German

A Day Will Come (German: Es kommt ein Tag) is a 1950 West German historical drama film directed by Rudolf Jugert and starring Dieter Borsche, Maria Schell and Lil Dagover. It was shot at the Göttingen Studios. The film's sets were designed by the art director Walter Haag. It is based on Ernst Penzoldt's novella Korporal Mombour, set at the time of the Franco-Prussian War.

== Cast ==
- Dieter Borsche as Friedrich
- Maria Schell as Madeleine
- Lil Dagover as Mme. Mombour
- Gustav Knuth as Paul
- Renate Mannhardt as Louise
- Else Ehser as Lisette
- Herbert Hübner as Monsieur Mombour
- Alfred Schieske as Oberst Schedy
- Gerd Martienzen as Duvernoy
- Wilhelm Meyer-Ottens as staff surgeon
- Ernst Legal as mayor
- Hans Mahnke as Poussin, carpenter
- Norbert Zeuner as Baptiste
