= The Day Before the Wedding =

1952 film

- Directed by: Rolf Thiele
- Written by: Rolf Thiele
- Produced by: Hans Abich; Rolf Thiele
- Starring: Paul Dahlke; Elisabeth Müller; Joachim Brennecke
- Cinematography: Oskar Schnirch
- Edited by: Caspar van den Berg
- Music by: Norbert Schultze
- Production company: Filmaufbau
- Distributed by: Schorcht Filmverleih
- Release date: 27 November 1952
- Running time: 97 minutes
- Country: West Germany
- Language: German

The Day Before the Wedding (German: Der Tag vor der Hochzeit) is a 1952 West German comedy film directed by Rolf Thiele and starring Paul Dahlke, Elisabeth Müller, and Joachim Brennecke. It was shot at the Göttingen Studios. The film's sets were designed by the art director Walter Haag.

== Plot ==
Surprisingly, high-ranking visitors have announced themselves in a sleepy small town: the Federal President himself is expected! But since the mayor's daughter wants to get married on this very day, the marriage must be postponed - at least that's what the bride's father thinks. Thea naturally sees things completely differently, and then resorts to a white lie in order not to have to let the long-desired appointment burst. The rest of the population is also thrown into all sorts of hectic activities in anticipation of the excitedly awaited state visit. The high-ranking gentlemen on the city council are arguing like tinkers about what special measures should be taken for the highest representative of the still young Federal Republic, while the opposition, in turn, has leaflets printed quickly.

Even the elderly colonel von Hanfstaengl finally feels asked again after a long time, since he hopes to be able to hoist the German flag on the presidential arrival. Amid all the hustle and bustle, an escaped canary manages to bring two lonely hearts together, while the culture officer finally confesses his love to the mayor's secretary as they work nights together in preparation for the visit. The Federal President arrives the next morning, and with her trick Thea has managed to finally marry her Hermann at the same time. All the hustle and bustle dissolves into pleasure, and the Federal President appreciates all the excitement of his officials with a benevolent expression.

== Cast ==
- Paul Dahlke as Bürgermeister
- Käthe Haack as Seine Frau
- Elisabeth Müller as Thea
- Joachim Brennecke as Hermann
- Günther Lüders as Weber
- Ursula Herking as Frl. Dr. Schreyvogel
- Walter Giller as Schurisch
- Elisabeth Flickenschildt as Frau Plitzka
- Wolfgang Lukschy as Dr. Leiden
- Adelheid Seeck as Frau Heidrich
- Die Schöneberger Sängerknaben as Themselves
- Heinrich Troxbömker as Oberst v. Hanffstaengl
- Susi Nicoletti as Frl. Kluge
- Gert Fröbe as Rundfunkreporter
- Beate Koepnick as Margot
- Arthur Mentz as Schwanke
- Hugo Lindinger as Pedell Ahlborn
- Elisabeth Goebel as Frl. Weidlich
- Hans Stiebner as Bäckermeister Zingel
- Else Reval as Seine Frau Amalie
- Adalbert Gausche as Pfarrer
- Ilse Künkele as Frl. Windhose
- Margit Ensinger as Marie
- Susanne Uhlendorff as Gertrud
- Tilo von Berlepsch
- Kurt Zips
- Kristian Schultze
- Fritz Brandt
- Eugen Bergen
- Erhard Pankratz
- Karlheinz Böhm
- Erich Fütterer

== Bibliography ==
- Bock, Hans-Michael; Bergfelder, Tim, eds. (2009). The Concise Cinegraph: Encyclopaedia of German Cinema. New York: Berghahn Books. ISBN 978-1-57181-655-9.
