= Königliche Hoheit (film) =

1953 film

- Directed by: Harald Braun
- Written by: Thomas Mann (novel); George Hurdalek; Hans Hömberg; Erika Mann
- Produced by: Hans Abich; Rolf Thiele
- Starring: Dieter Borsche; Ruth Leuwerik; Lil Dagover
- Cinematography: Werner Krien
- Edited by: Claus von Boro
- Music by: Mark Lothar
- Production company: Filmaufbau
- Distributed by: Schorcht Filmverleih
- Release date: 22 December 1953
- Running time: 102 minutes
- Country: West Germany
- Language: German

His Royal Highness (German: Königliche Hoheit) Königliche Hoheit is a 1953 West German comedy film directed by Harald Braun and starring Dieter Borsche, Ruth Leuwerik, and Lil Dagover. It is based on the 1909 novel of the same name by Thomas Mann.

The film was made at the Göttingen Studios and on location around Fulda in Hesse. It was shot using Gevacolor. The film's sets were designed by the art director Walter Haag.

== Cast ==
- Dieter Borsche as Prince Klaus Heinrich
- Ruth Leuwerik as Imma Spoelman
- Lil Dagover as Gräfin Löwenjoul
- Mathias Wieman as Dr. Raoul Überbein
- Rudolf Fernau as Großherzog Albrecht
- Paul Henckels as Hofmarschall Bühl zu Bühl
- Günther Lüders as Kammerdiener Neumann
- Paul Bildt as Staatsminister von Knobelsdorff
- Heinz Hilpert as Samuel Spoelman
- Herbert Hübner as General
- Kurt Vespermann as Finanzminister Krippenreuther
- Tilo von Berlepsch as Adjutant Graf Schellenberg
