= Meyen =

Meyen is a family name that may refer to:

- Franz Julius Ferdinand Meyen (1804-1840) was a German physician and botanist (abbreviation: Meyen).
- Harry Meyen (1924–1979) was a German film actor.
- Sergei Viktorovich Meyen (1935–1987) was a Russian botanist, paleontologist, geologist, Dr.Sci.Biol (abbreviation: S.V.Meyen).
