= She (1954 film) =

1954 film

- Directed by: Rolf Thiele
- Written by: Rolf Thiele
- Based on: Ő; 1937 novel by Gábor Vaszary
- Produced by: Hans Abich; Rolf Thiele
- Starring: Marina Vlady; Walter Giller; Nadja Tiller
- Cinematography: Karl Schröder
- Edited by: Caspar van den Berg
- Music by: Hans-Martin Majewski
- Production company: Filmaufbau
- Distributed by: Herzog Film
- Release date: 9 September 1954
- Running time: 95 minutes
- Country: West Germany
- Language: German

She (German: Sie) is a 1954 West German romantic comedy film directed by Rolf Thiele and starring Marina Vlady, Walter Giller, and Nadja Tiller.It was made at Göttingen Studios and on location in several sites including Paris. The film's sets were designed by the art director Walter Haag.

== Plot ==
In Paris a Hungarian illustrator becomes engaged to Céline, the seventeen-year-old daughter of the owner of the newspaper at which he works. They have to wait four years until she is legally able to marry him. In the meantime he seems to have become attracted to a young Italian woman.

== Cast ==
- Marina Vlady as Céline
- Walter Giller as Ypsilon
- Nadja Tiller as Din
- Wera Frydtberg as Louise
- Hilde Hildebrand as Nachbarin
- Klaus Behrendt as Semmelhans
- Kurt A. Jung as Joska, Reporter
- Gregor von Rezzori as Redakteur
- Walter M. Wülf as Hausmeister
