= Keepers of the Night =

1949 West German drama film

- Directed by: Harald Braun
- Written by: Paul Alverdes; Harald Braun
- Produced by: Hans Abich; Harald Braun; Jacob Geis; Rolf Thiele
- Starring: Luise Ullrich; Hans Nielsen; René Deltgen
- Cinematography: Josef Illig; Franz Koch
- Edited by: Fritz Stapenhorst
- Music by: Mark Lothar
- Production companies: Filmaufbau; Neue Deutsche Filmgesellschaft
- Distributed by: Schorcht Filmverleih
- Release date: 21 October 1949
- Running time: 110 minutes
- Country: West Germany
- Language: German

Keepers of the Night (German: Nachtwache) is a 1949 West German drama film directed by Harald Braun and starring Luise Ullrich, Hans Nielsen and René Deltgen. It was made as a partnership between a Göttingen-based company and one located in Munich. Much of the shooting took place at the Göttingen Studios. The film's sets were designed by the art director Walter Haag.

== Cast ==
- Luise Ullrich as Cornelie
- Hans Nielsen as Pfarrer Johannes Heger
- René Deltgen as Stefan Gorgas
- Dieter Borsche as Kaplan von Imhoff
- Angelika Meissner as Lotte Heger
- Käthe Haack as Oberin von Heiliggeist
- Gertrud Eysoldt as Schwester Jakobe
- Annette Schleiermacher as Helferin
- Nicolas Koline as Karnickelmann
- Herbert Kroll as Bürgermeister
- Hans Hermann Schaufuß
- Marion Gauer
- Peter Paul
- Anne-Marie Hanschke
- Gudrun Rabente
- Claire Reigbert
- Sigrid Becker
- Ingeborg Morawski
- Ilona Lamée
- Gabriele Roden
- Ursula Thiess
- Charlotte Huhn
- Otto Brodowski
- Odo Krohmann
- Maut Mauthe
- Hermann Nehlsen

== Bibliography ==
- Bock, Hans-Michael & Bergfelder, Tim. The Concise Cinegraph: Encyclopaedia of German Cinema. Berghahn Books, 2009.
