= A Woman for Life =

1960 film

- Directed by: Wolfgang Liebeneiner
- Written by: Oliver Hassencamp; George Hurdalek; Herbert Reinecker
- Produced by: Werner Fischer; Utz Utermann
- Starring: Ruth Leuwerik; Klausjürgen Wussow; Harry Meyen
- Cinematography: Helmut Ashley
- Edited by: Margot von Schlieffen
- Music by: Franz Grothe
- Production company: Bavaria Film
- Distributed by: Bavaria Film
- Release date: 27 September 1960
- Running time: 122 minutes
- Country: West Germany
- Language: German

A Woman for Life (German: Eine Frau fürs ganze Leben) is a 1960 West German musical comedy film directed by Wolfgang Liebeneiner and starring Ruth Leuwerik, Klausjürgen Wussow, and Harry Meyen.

The film's sets were designed by Robert Herlth and Robert Stratil. It was made at the Bavaria Studios in Munich.

== Partial cast ==
- Ruth Leuwerik as Margarete Barnebusch
- Klausjürgen Wussow as Oberleutnant Baron Ernst Ewald von Bergen
- Harry Meyen as Leutnant Karl Degenhardt
- Gustav Knuth as Vater Barnebusch
- Theo Lingen as Ganove #1
- Maria Sebaldt as Mathilde Kanecke
- Friedrich Domin as Vater Heinemann
- Mila Kopp
- Helga Schlack
- Klaus Löwitsch as Willy Heinemann
- Astrid Frank as Margarete Ursula Friederike Heinemann
- Karl Lieffen as Magier
- Rudolf Rhomberg as Ganove #2
- Anaid Iplicjian as Mutter Barnebusch
- Werner Hessenland
- Richard Hellmann

== Bibliography ==
- Bock, Hans-Michael; Bergfelder, Tim, eds. (2009). The Concise Cinegraph: Encyclopaedia of German Cinema. New York: Berghahn Books. ISBN 978-1-57181-655-9.
