= Goodbye, Franziska =

Goodbye, Franziska (German:Auf Wiedersehn, Franziska) may refer to:

- Goodbye, Franziska (novel), a novel by Heinrich Heining
- Goodbye, Franziska (1941 film), a German film directed by Helmut Käutner
- Goodbye, Franziska (1957 film), a German film directed by Wolfgang Liebeneiner
