= Without You All Is Darkness =

- Directed by: Curd Jürgens
- Written by: Walter Forster; George Hurdalek
- Produced by: Hans Abich; Rolf Thiele; Gero Wecker
- Starring: Curd Jürgens; Eva Bartok; René Deltgen; Ursula Grabley
- Cinematography: Friedl Behn-Grund
- Edited by: Caspar van den Berg
- Music by: Hans-Martin Majewski
- Production company: Arca-Filmproduktion
- Distributed by: Neue Filmverleih
- Release date: 17 August 1956
- Running time: 103 minutes
- Country: West Germany
- Language: German

Without You All Is Darkness (German: Ohne dich wird es Nacht) is a 1956 West German drama film directed by and starring Curd Jürgens. Eva Bartok, René Deltgen and Ursula Grabley also star.

The film's sets were designed by the art direction Fritz Maurischat and Ernst Schomer. It was shot at the Göttingen Studios and on location in Hamburg and Kassel.

== Cast ==
- Eva Bartok as Gina Bergold
- Curd Jürgens as Dr. Robert Kessler
- René Deltgen as Charly Justin
- Ernst Schröder as Arthur Wehrmann
- Ursula Grabley as Hella - Bardame
- Carl Wery as Roberts Vater
- Karin Evans as Fräulein Bahlke
- Hedwig Wangel as Julchen
- Leonard Steckel as Dr. Bräuner
- Wolfgang Neuss as Apotheker

== Bibliography ==
- Victoria DeGrazia & Ellen Furlough. The Sex of Things: Gender and Consumption in Historical Perspective. University of California Press, 1996.
