= Mamitschka =

1955 film

- Directed by: Rolf Thiele
- Written by: Rolf Thiele
- Produced by: Hans Abich; Rolf Thiele
- Starring: Mila Kopp; Rudolf Platte; Jester Naefe
- Cinematography: Karl Schröder
- Edited by: Caspar van den Berg
- Music by: Norbert Schultze
- Production company: Filmaufbau
- Distributed by: Deutsche London Film
- Release date: 29 September 1955
- Running time: 95 minutes
- Country: West Germany
- Language: German

Mamitschka is a 1955 West German comedy-drama film directed by Rolf Thiele and starring Mila Kopp, Rudolf Platte and Jester Naefe.

It was shot at the Göttingen Studios and on location around Bamberg in Bavaria. The film's sets were designed by the art director Walter Haag.

== Plot ==
The film portrays the attempts of a family of Sudeten German refugees struggling to adjust to living in post-war Germany following their forced expulsion from Czechoslovakia. Eventually their daughter marries a soldier of the American occupying forces, himself of German descent, and the whole family emigrate to the United States.

== Cast ==
- Mila Kopp as Mamitschka
- Rudolf Platte as Tatinek
- Jester Naefe as Rosa
- Karl Hackenber as Frantek
- Ida Krottendorf as Nozena
- Evi Kent as Olga
- Dieter Thiele as Joseph
- Michael Hahn as Poldi
- Robert Haller as Baldur
- Klaus Behrendt as Wilborn
- Paul Henckels as Herr Samhaber
- Margarethe Andersen as Frau Samhaber
- Irka Peter as Witwe Nickel
- Kurt A. Jung as Herr Merkel
- Tilo von Berlepsch as Baron Hiebel
- Ursula Grabley as Frau Hiebel
- Gerd Frickhöffer as Geschäftsführer
- Ilse Künkele as Frau Duckheberle
