= Queen Louise (1957 film) =

1957 film

- Directed by: Wolfgang Liebeneiner
- Written by: George Hurdalek
- Produced by: Utz Utermann
- Starring: Ruth Leuwerik; Dieter Borsche; Bernhard Wicki; René Deltgen
- Cinematography: Werner Krien
- Edited by: Lisbeth Neumann
- Music by: Franz Grothe
- Production company: Divina-Film
- Distributed by: Gloria Film
- Release date: 15 February 1957
- Running time: 100 minutes
- Country: West Germany
- Language: German

Queen Louise (German: Königin Luise) is a 1957 West German historical drama film directed by Wolfgang Liebeneiner and starring Ruth Leuwerik, Dieter Borsche and Bernhard Wicki. It was made at the Emelka Studios (Bavaria Studios) in Munich, with sets designed by the art director Rolf Zehetbauer. It was one of a number of films made during the 1950s that portrayed historical royal Germany in a positive manner. It is similar in theme to the Prussian film genre which had been popular between the two World Wars including two previous films about Louise Queen Louise (1927) and Louise, Queen of Prussia (1931).

== Synopsis ==
The film depicts the life of Louise of Mecklenburg-Strelitz, the wife of Frederick William III of Prussia, and her stand against Napoleon during the Napoleonic Wars.

== Cast ==
- Ruth Leuwerik as Königin Luise
- Dieter Borsche as König Friedrich Wilhelm
- Bernhard Wicki as Zar Alexander
- René Deltgen as Napoleon
- Hans Nielsen as Hardenberg
- Charles Regnier as Charles Maurice de Talleyrand-Périgord
- Peter Arens as Louis Ferdinand
- Friedrich Domin as Herzog von Mecklenburg-Strelitz
- Margarete Haagen as Gräfin Voss
- Irene Marhold as Friederike
- Alexander Golling as Großfürst Konstantin
- Ado Riegler as Von Köckritz
- Lotte Brackebusch as Bäuerin
- Joseph Offenbach as Bürgermeister

== Bibliography ==
- Hake, Sabine (2013). German National Cinema (2nd ed.). Routledge. ISBN 978-1-136-02054-4.
