= Beloved Life =

1953 film

- German film poster
- German: Geliebtes Leben
- Directed by: Rolf Thiele
- Written by: Rolf Thiele
- Produced by: Hans Abich; Werner Schwier; Rolf Thiele
- Starring: Ruth Leuwerik; Carl Raddatz; Albert Lieven
- Cinematography: Kurt Hasse
- Edited by: Caspar van den Berg
- Music by: Norbert Schultze
- Production company: Filmaufbau
- Distributed by: Bavaria Film; Sascha Film (Austria)
- Release date: 15 October 1953
- Running time: 109 minutes
- Country: West Germany
- Language: German

Beloved Life (German: Geliebtes Leben) is a 1953 West German drama film directed by Rolf Thiele and starring Ruth Leuwerik, Carl Raddatz and Albert Lieven. Following her husband's release from a prisoner of war camp in 1947, a woman remembers their lives together since the pre-First World War era.

It was made at the Göttingen Studios and on location in Hamburg. The film's sets were designed by Walter Haag and Erich Kutzner.

== Cast ==
- Ruth Leuwerik as Louise von Bolin
- Carl Raddatz as Carl von Bolin
- Albert Lieven as Joachim von Bolin
- Maria Sebaldt as Imke von Bolin
- Karl Ludwig Diehl as Oberst von Bolin
- Horst Hächler as Benno von Bolin
- Harry Meyen as Jürgen von Bolin
- Eva Bubat as Auguste, housekeeper
