= Walter Forster (screenwriter) =

Austrian screenwriter (1900–1968)

- Born: 22 January 1900
- Died: 14 December 1968 (aged 68)
- Occupation: Screenwriter

Walter Forster (22 January 1900 – 14 December 1968) was an Austrian screenwriter.

== Selected filmography ==
- End of the Rainbow (1930)
- A Door Opens (1933)
- Enjoy Yourselves (1934)
- Miss Liselott (1934)
- Marriage Strike (1935)
- Marionette (1939)
- Through the Forests and Through the Trees (1956)
- The Royal Waltz (1935, 1955)
- Susanne in the Bath (1936)
- Togger (1937)
- The Irresistible Man (1937)
- Mistake of the Heart (1939)
- Between Hamburg and Haiti (1940)
- Happiness is the Main Thing (1941)
- Mask in Blue (1943)
- Carnival of Love (1943)
- Knall and Fall as Imposters (1952)
- The Landlady of Maria Wörth (1952)
- The Rose of Stamboul (1953)
- The Divorcée (1953)
- Mask in Blue (1953)
- Prisoners of Love (1954)
- The Royal Waltz (1955)
- Without You All Is Darkness (1956)
- The Ideal Woman (1959)
- Final Accord (1960)
- Aurora Marriage Bureau (1962)
