= Leonard Steckel =

German-Jewish actor and director

Leonard Steckel (18 January 1901 – 9 February 1971) was a German-Jewish actor and director of stage and screen.

Steckel was born as Leonhard Steckel in Knihinin, a Galician town that is today a district of the city Ivano-Frankivsk, Ukraine. He began his career as a stage actor and spent the duration of World War II in exile in Zürich, Switzerland, where he had gone to work at the Schauspielhaus Zürich. It was during this time that he began to direct. Steckel was killed in a major rail accident on 9 February 1971 in Aitrang, West Germany.

== Partial filmography ==
- Phantoms of Happiness (1930) - Gefängnisarzt
- M (1931) - Man (uncredited)
- The Adventurer of Tunis (1931) - Ferrero
- The Daredevil (1931) - Barini, Inhaber American Hippodrom
- The Captain from Köpenick (1931) - Krakauer, ein Trödler
- Secret Agent (1932) - Oberst Salit
- The Company's in Love (1932) - Harry Bing - Regisseur
- Gitta Discovers Her Heart (1932) - Der Primas
- Nights in Port Said (1932) - Le levantin
- I Do Not Want to Know Who You Are (1932) - Alvarez Zambesi
- Mieter Schulze gegen alle (1932)
- Spies at the Savoy Hotel (1932) - Almassy, Antiquitätenhändler
- Kampf um Blond (1933) - Der Levantiner
- The House of Dora Green (1933) - Sucharow
- A Song for You (1933) - Opern-Regisseur
- Hände aus dem Dunkel (1933) - Fed Harras, Propagandachef
- Invisible Opponent (1933) - Santos
- Palace Hotel (1952) - Minor Role (uncredited)
- The Venus of Tivoli (1953) - Director
- Southern Nights (1953) - Giuseppe
- Meines Vaters Pferde (1954, part 1, 2) - Schlachtauer
- The Seven Dresses of Katrin (1954) - Mödel, Theater-Direktor
- Viktoria und ihr Husar (1954)
- The Last Summer (1954) - Kommissar Berki
- Spring Song (1954) - Dr. Falconi
- The Eternal Waltz (1954) - Baron Carlo Todesco
- Beloved Enemy (1955) - Oberst Junot (uncredited)
- Love Without Illusions (1955) - Professor Dürkheim
- Du mein stilles Tal (1955) - Doktor
- Ballerina (1956) - Opernintendant
- The Captain from Köpenick (1956) - Adolph Wormser
- Without You All Is Darkness (1956) - Dr. Bräuner
- Stresemann (1957) - Aristide Briand
- Escape from Sahara (1958) - Ben Achmed
- The Doctor of Stalingrad (1958) - Major Dr. Kresin, Distriktarzt
- The Green Devils of Monte Cassino (1958) - Erzabt
- Majestät auf Abwegen (1958) - Filmregisseur
- Romarei, das Mädchen mit den grünen Augen (1958) - Sir Boris Olinzoff
- For Love and Others (1959) - Ihr Vater
- Ja, so ein Mädchen mit sechzehn (1959) - Arzt
- Marili (1959) - Ludwig Ostertag
- Sweetheart of the Gods (1960) - Furst
- The Secret of the Black Trunk (1962) - Dr. Daniel Bransby, Arzt
- The Phone Rings Every Night (1962) - Th. Th. Th. Meyer
- Zwei Whisky und ein Sofa (1963) - Dehn
- The Visit (1964) - Minister
- Once a Greek (1966) - Maire Dutour
