= A Woman Who Knows What She Wants (1958 film) =

1958 film directed by Arthur Maria Rabenalt

- Lilli Palmer
- German: Eine Frau, die weiß, was sie will
- Directed by: Arthur Maria Rabenalt
- Written by: Oscar Straus (libretto); Alfred Grünwald (libretto); Louis Verneuil (libretto); Robert Thoeren; Fritz Eckhardt; Herbert Witt; Per Schwenzen; Arthur Maria Rabenalt
- Produced by: Hans Abich; Arthur Maria Rabenalt
- Starring: Lilli Palmer; Peter Schütte; Maria Sebaldt
- Cinematography: Werner Krien
- Edited by: Lilian Seng
- Music by: Erwin Straus
- Production company: Bavaria Film
- Distributed by: Bavaria Film
- Release date: 25 February 1958
- Running time: 101 minutes
- Country: West Germany
- Language: German

A Woman Who Knows What She Wants (German: Eine Frau, die weiß, was sie will) is a 1958 West German musical comedy film directed by Arthur Maria Rabenalt and starring Lilli Palmer, Peter Schütte and Maria Sebaldt. It is based on a 1932 stage musical composed by Oscar Straus, which had previously been made into a 1934 film.

It was shot at the Bavaria Studios in Munich. The film's sets were designed by the art director Walter Haag.

== Cast ==
- Lilli Palmer as Julia Klöhn, Lehrerin & Angela Cavallini
- Peter Schütte as Viktor Keller
- Maria Sebaldt as Emmy
- Rudolf Vogel as Herzmansky
- Gerd Frickhöffer as Fritz Hollmann
- Fritz Eckhardt as Arpad Kelemen
- Rudolf Rhomberg as Dr. Kladde
- Barbara Gallauner as Sängerin
- Karl-Heinz Peters as Würschich
- Alfons Teuber as Gerichtsvollzieher
- Gusti Kreissl as Frau Krause
- Toni Treutler
- Ursula Dinkgräfe as Frau Müller
