= Goodbye, Franziska (1957 film) =

1957 film

- Directed by: Wolfgang Liebeneiner
- Written by: George Hurdalek
- Based on: Goodbye, Franziska by Helmut Käutner
- Produced by: Heinz Abel; Artur Brauner; Utz Utermann
- Starring: Ruth Leuwerik; Carlos Thompson; Josef Meinrad; Friedrich Domin
- Cinematography: Werner Krien
- Edited by: Margot von Schlieffen
- Music by: Franz Grothe
- Production company: CCC Film
- Distributed by: Gloria Film
- Release date: 5 September 1957
- Running time: 105 minutes
- Country: West Germany
- Language: German

Goodbye, Franziska (German: Auf Wiedersehen, Franziska!) is a 1957 West German romance film directed by Wolfgang Liebeneiner and starring Ruth Leuwerik, Carlos Thompson and Josef Meinrad. It is a remake of the 1941 film of the same name. It was shot at the Spandau Studios in Berlin. The film's sets were designed by the art directors Gottfried Will and Rolf Zehetbauer.

== Cast ==
- Ruth Leuwerik as Franziska
- Carlos Thompson as Stefan Roloff
- Josef Meinrad as Dr. Leitner
- Friedrich Domin as Professor Thiemann
- Jochen Brockmann as Mr. 'Blacky' White
- Nadja Regin as Helen Philipps
- Gisela Trowe as Gusti
- Siegfried Schürenberg as Harris
- Peter Elsholtz as Anwalt
- Else Ehser as Kathrin

== Bibliography ==
- Parish, James Robert. Film Actors Guide: Western Europe. Scarecrow Press, 1977.
