= The Ideal Woman =

1959 film by Josef von Báky

- Directed by: Josef von Báky
- Written by: Hildegard Brücker; Walter Forster; Joachim Wedekind
- Produced by: Utz Utermann
- Starring: Ruth Leuwerik; Martin Benrath; Boy Gobert
- Cinematography: Werner Krien
- Edited by: Gertrud Hinz-Nischwitz
- Music by: Georg Haentzschel
- Production company: Bavaria Film
- Distributed by: Bavaria Film
- Release date: 25 August 1959
- Running time: 104 minutes
- Country: West Germany
- Language: German

The Ideal Woman (German: Die ideale Frau) is a 1959 West German comedy film directed by Josef von Báky and starring Ruth Leuwerik, Martin Benrath and Boy Gobert. It was made at the Bavaria Studios in Munich. The film's sets were designed by the art directors Hans Jürgen Kiebach and Fritz Maurischat. Location shooting took place around Landshut and in Monaco.

== Synopsis ==
Fanny Becker, the mayor of Rosenburg, meets a former lover and is tempted to resume her romance with him, but eventually decides to remain with her husband (the leader of the opposition in Rosenburg).

== Cast ==
- Ruth Leuwerik as Fanny Becker
- Martin Benrath as Axel Jungk
- Boy Gobert as Jaroslaw Martini
- Friedrich Domin as Justizrat Becker
- Agnes Windeck as Frau Jungk
- Heinrich Gretler as Stadtrat Niggelmann
- Paul Hoffmann as Stadtdirektor Rechnitz
- Lukas Ammann as Butler
- Hellmuth Haupt as Toni Adam
- Käthe Itter as Anna
- Anette Karmann as Evi Niggelmann

== Bibliography ==
- Hans-Michael Bock and Tim Bergfelder. The Concise Cinegraph: An Encyclopedia of German Cinema. Berghahn Books, 2009.
