= Portrait of an Unknown Woman (film) =

1954 film directed by Helmut Käutner

- Directed by: Helmut Käutner
- Written by: Hans Jacoby; Helmut Käutner
- Produced by: Herbert Junghans; Utz Utermann
- Starring: Ruth Leuwerik; O. W. Fischer; Irene von Meyendorff
- Cinematography: Werner Krien
- Edited by: Anneliese Schönnenbeck
- Music by: Franz Grothe
- Production company: Sirius-Film
- Distributed by: Schorcht Filmverleih
- Release date: 27 August 1954
- Running time: 100 minutes
- Country: West Germany
- Language: German

Portrait of an Unknown Woman (German: Bildnis einer Unbekannten) is a 1954 West German comedy film directed by Helmut Käutner and starring Ruth Leuwerik, O. W. Fischer and Irene von Meyendorff. It was shot at the Bavaria Studios in Munich and on location in Madrid and Paris. The film's sets were designed by the art directors Ludwig Reiber and Max Seefelder.

== Synopsis ==
A potential scandal breaks out when an artist adds the head of the wife of a diplomat to a nude painting he is working on.

== Cast ==
- Ruth Leuwerik as Nicole
- O. W. Fischer as Jan Maria Keller
- Erich Schellow as Walter
- Irene von Meyendorff as Ambassador's Wife
- Albrecht Schoenhals as Ambassador
- Paul Hoffmann as Philip Hernandez
- Bum Krüger as Bar Owner
- Ulrich Beiger as Auctioneer
- Nicolas Koline as Sascha
- Ingrid van Bergen as Jacqueline, a model

== Bibliography ==
- Bock, Hans-Michael; Bergfelder, Tim, eds. (2009). The Concise Cinegraph: Encyclopaedia of German Cinema. New York: Berghahn Books. ISBN 978-1-57181-655-9.
