= The Golden Bridge =

1956 film

- Directed by: Paul Verhoeven
- Written by: Juliane Kay; Werner P. Zibaso; Lajos Zilahy (novel)
- Produced by: Utz Utermann
- Starring: Ruth Leuwerik; Curd Jürgens; Paul Hubschmid
- Cinematography: Werner Krien
- Edited by: Gertrud Hinz-Nischwitz
- Music by: Franz Grothe
- Distributed by: Gloria Film
- Release date: 31 May 1956
- Running time: 105 minutes
- Country: West Germany
- Language: German

The Golden Bridge (German: Die goldene Brücke) is a 1956 West German drama film directed by Paul Verhoeven and starring Ruth Leuwerik, Curd Jürgens and Paul Hubschmid. It was shot at the Bavaria Studios in Munich. The film's sets were designed by the art director Max Mellin.

== Cast ==
- Ruth Leuwerik as Tima
- Curd Jürgens as Balder
- Paul Hubschmid as Stefan
- Jester Naefe as Ann
- Rudolf Vogel as Hoppe
- Adrienne Gessner as Tante Jula
- Armin Dahlen as Hellborg
- Alexander Golling as Bessing
- Paul Verhoeven as Filmregisseur

== Bibliography ==
- Bock, Hans-Michael & Bergfelder, Tim. The Concise CineGraph. Encyclopedia of German Cinema. Berghahn Books, 2009.
