= Escape from Sahara =

1958 film

- Directed by: Wolfgang Staudte
- Written by: Emil Burri; Werner Jörg Lüddecke; Johannes Mario Simmel
- Produced by: Otto Meissner; Peter Schaeffers; Aldo von Pinelli
- Starring: Hildegard Knef; Bernhard Wicki; Hannes Messemer
- Cinematography: Václav Vích
- Edited by: Martha Dübber
- Music by: Siegfried Franz
- Production company: Melodie Film
- Distributed by: UFA
- Release date: 21 January 1958
- Running time: 101 minutes
- Country: West Germany
- Language: German

Escape from Sahara (German: Madeleine und der Legionär) is a 1958 West German adventure drama film directed by Wolfgang Staudte and starring Hildegard Knef, Bernhard Wicki and Hannes Messemer. It was shot at the Tempelhof Studios in Berlin with location shooting taking place in Cuxhaven and in Tangier in North Africa. The film's sets were designed by the art directors Andrej Andrejew, Fritz Lippmann and Helmut Nentwig. It was part of an upsurge of popular interest in West Germany about France's War in Algeria, particularly Germans serving there.

== Synopsis ==
A French teacher assists a German serving in the French Foreign Legion who has deserted.

== Cast ==
- Hildegard Knef as Madeleine Durand
- Bernhard Wicki as Luigi Locatelli
- Hannes Messemer as Robert Altmann
- Helmut Schmid as Kilby, Pat
- Joachim Hansen as Kurt Gerber
- Harry Meyen as Jean de Maire
- Leonard Steckel as Ben Achmed
- Werner Peters as Brouillard
- Siegfried Lowitz as Kapitän Gerlach
- Hanita Hallan as Miss. Price
- Manfred Heidmann as Perrier
- Friedrich Gnaß as Germanini
- Ursula Diestel as Lucienne Germanini

== Bibliography ==
- Biess, Frank. German Angst: Fear and Democracy in the Federal Republic of Germany. Oxford University Press, 2020.
- Broadbent, Philip & Hake, Sabine. Berlin Divided City, 1945-1989. Berghahn Books, 2010.
