= The Man Who Sold Himself (1959 film) =

1959 film

- Directed by: Josef von Báky
- Written by: Olaf Herfeldt; Erich Kuby; Wolf Neumeister
- Produced by: Hans Abich; Eberhard Krause; Rolf Thiele
- Starring: Hildegard Knef; Hansjörg Felmy; Antje Weisgerber
- Cinematography: Friedl Behn-Grund
- Edited by: Caspar van den Berg
- Music by: Georg Haentzschel
- Production company: Filmaufbau
- Distributed by: Europa-Filmverleih
- Release date: 12 March 1959
- Running time: 98 minutes
- Country: West Germany
- Language: German

The Man Who Sold Himself (German: Der Mann, der sich verkaufte) is a 1959 West German crime film directed by Josef von Báky and starring Hildegard Knef, Hansjörg Felmy and Antje Weisgerber.

It was shot at the Wandsbek Studios in Hamburg. The film's sets were designed by the art directors Erich Kettelhut and Johannes Ott.

== Cast ==
- Hildegard Knef as Martina Schilling
- Hansjörg Felmy as Niko Jost
- Antje Weisgerber as Mrs. Sending
- Kurt Ehrhardt as Carl Sending
- Katharina Matz as Eva Jost
- Ernst Schroder as Münchmann
- Fritz Tillmann as Dr. Schilling
- Charles Brauer
- Fritz Schmiedel as Anton Klee
- Ruth Grossi as Lo Hermann
- Hans Paetsch as Steinmaker
- Jürgen Graf as Fernsehreporter
- Walter Grüters as Minister Ploesch
- Ruth Hausmeister as Sekretärin von Sending
- Bob Iller as Textilfabrikant Rissner
- Günther Jerschke as Dr. Zerbst
- Karl Kramer as Likörfabrikant Kahler
- Karl-Heinz Kreienbaum as Kriminalkommissar Droehnlein
- Hans Leibelt as Bürgermeister
- Erwin Linder as Prosecutor
- Robert Meyn as Herr Stückli
- Reinhold Nietschmann as Warenhausbesitzer Bentheim
- Heinz Piper as Hotelportier
- Karl-Georg Saebisch as Lawyer Longinus
- Manfred Steffen
- Hans Timerding as Oberkellner Berger

== Bibliography ==
- Bock, Hans-Michael & Bergfelder, Tim. The Concise CineGraph. Encyclopedia of German Cinema. Berghahn Books, 2009.
