= Taiga (1958 film) =

1958 film

- Directed by: Wolfgang Liebeneiner
- Written by: Herbert Reinecker
- Produced by: Utz Utermann
- Starring: Ruth Leuwerik; Hannes Messemer; Günter Pfitzmann
- Cinematography: Georg Krause
- Edited by: Margot von Schlieffen
- Music by: Christian Riss
- Production company: Bavaria Film
- Distributed by: Schorcht Filmverleih; Sascha Film (Austria)
- Release date: 28 August 1958
- Running time: 100 minutes
- Country: West Germany
- Language: German

Taiga is a 1958 West German drama film directed by Wolfgang Liebeneiner and starring Ruth Leuwerik, Hannes Messemer and Günter Pfitzmann.

It was shot at the Bavaria Studios in Munich. The film's sets were designed by the art directors Robert Herlth and Gottfried Will. The title refers to the taiga that covers much of Siberia.

== Synopsis ==
After the Second World War a female doctor tends to the German prisoners held in a camp in Siberia.

== Cast ==
- Ruth Leuwerik as Hanna Dietrich
- Hannes Messemer as Roeder
- Günter Pfitzmann as Dickmann
- Viktor Staal as Weber
- Hans Quest as Weinert
- Paul Bösiger as Reimers
- Walter Ladengast as Bachmann
- Willi Rose as Berthold
- Charles Regnier as Becker
- Alexander Engel as Sazarin
- Peter Lühr as Westrecht
- Werner Hessenland as Kessler
- August Holler as Schönreich
- Egon Vogel as Beyfuss
- Georg Lehn as Fahlke
- Willy Schultes as Seitz
- Peter Capell as Richter
- Arnulf Schröder as Feuerbach
- Wolfgang Büttner as Sennewald
- Wolf Ackva as Engelhardt
- Ernst Konstantin as Malinkovic
- Peter Vogel as Winter

== Bibliography ==
- Frey, Mattias. Postwall German Cinema: History, Film History and Cinephilia. Berghahn Books, 2013.
