= Else Ehser =

German actress (1894–1968)

- Born: 22 November 1894; Leipzig, Saxony, German Empire
- Died: 19 March 1968 (aged 73); West Berlin, West Germany
- Occupation: Actress
- Years active: 1931-1968 (film)

Else Ehser (1894–1968) was a German stage actress. She also made numerous appearances in German films in supporting roles, such as her performance as Maria Theresa of Spain in the 1935 film The Private Life of Louis XIV.

== Selected filmography ==
- M (1931) - Woman (uncredited)
- Mädchen in Uniform (1931) - Gardrobiere Elise (uncredited)
- The First Right of the Child (1932)
- Elisabeth and the Fool (1934) - Haushälterin Hörnlein
- Hanneles Himmelfahrt (1934) - Tulpe
- The Private Life of Louis XIV (1935) - Maria Theresa, Königin von Frankreich
- Pillars of Society (1935)
- The Dreamer (1936) - Frl. Wetterhahn - Schneiderin
- Family Parade (1936) - Gräfin Güldenstjerna
- City of Anatol (1936) - Rosas Mutter
- Daphne and the Diplomat (1937) - Schneiderin
- The Yellow Flag (1937) - Gloria Sanders
- Tango Notturno (1937) - Die Garderobiere bei Mado
- You and I (1938) - Nettie
- Silvesternacht am Alexanderplatz (1939)
- Stars of Variety (1939) - Emilie Schmitz - Garderobiere
- Madame Butterfly (1939)
- Central Rio (1939) - Garderobiere
- Die gute Sieben (1940) - Die 2. Garderobiere
- Das leichte Mädchen (1940) - Tante Christa
- Aufruhr im Damenstift (1941) - Frl. von Bruun
- The Golden City (1942) - Dienstmagd bei Anna
- When the Young Wine Blossoms (1943) - Sophie
- Der Mann, dem man den Namen stahl (1944) - Die ältere Kundin von Elviras Schalter
- Der Puppenspieler (1945)
- Das Leben geht weiter (1945)
- No Place for Love (1947)
- The Adventures of Fridolin (1948) - Die Pensionsdame
- The Court Concert (1948)
- Girls Behind Bars (1949) - Hanna Späthe, 'Hannchen'
- Don't Play with Love (1949) - Souffleuse
- A Day Will Come (1950) - Lisette
- Immortal Beloved (1951) - Trienke
- Herz der Welt (1952)
- Postlagernd Turteltaube (1952)
- Little Red Riding Hood (1953) - Großmutter
- Roman eines Frauenarztes (1954) - Schwester Emma
- Der Froschkönig (1954) - Kleiderfrau Marliese
- Roman einer Siebzehnjährigen (1955)
- Devil in Silk (1956) - Frau Schwarz
- Studentin Helene Willfüer (1956)
- Like Once Lili Marleen (1956) - Aufwartefrau
- Goodbye, Franziska (1957) - Kathrin
- The Glass Tower (1957) - Frau Wiedecke
- Bezaubernde Arabella (1959)
- Ich schwöre und gelobe (1960) - Frau Säbisch
- The Castle (1968) - Mizzi (final film role)

== Bibliography ==
- Klossner, Michael. The Europe of 1500-1815 on Film and Television: A Worldwide Filmography of Over 2550 Works, 1895 Through 2000. McFarland & Company, 2002.
