= The Sergeant's Daughter =

1952 film

- Directed by: George Hurdalek
- Written by: Carl Heinz Jarosy; Kurt Heuser; George Hurdalek
- Based on: Zapfenstreich by Franz Adam Beyerlein
- Starring: Johanna Matz; Jan Hendriks; Friedrich Domin
- Cinematography: Georg Bruckbauer
- Edited by: Margarete von Schlieffen
- Music by: Theo Mackeben
- Production companies: Como Film; Royal-Produktion
- Distributed by: Allianz Filmverleih
- Release date: 3 October 1952
- Running time: 100 minutes
- Country: West Germany
- Language: German

The Sergeant's Daughter (German: Der große Zapfenstreich) is a 1952 West German war romance film directed by George Hurdalek and starring Johanna Matz, Jan Hendriks and Friedrich Domin. It was based on a 1903 novel by Franz Adam Beyerlein which portrayed life in the army of Wilhelm II.

It was made at the Bavaria Studios in Munich and on location at historic barracks at Ingolstadt. The film's sets were designed by Robert Herlth and Kurt Herlth.

== Synopsis ==
Before the outbreak of the First World War, the daughter of a sergeant in the cavalry falls in love with a junior officer, despite already being engaged to another soldier.

== Cast ==
- Johanna Matz as Kläre Volkhardt
- Jan Hendriks as Leutnant Christian von Lauffen
- Friedrich Domin as Wachtmeister Volkhardt
- Paul Hartmann as Freiherr von Lauffen
- O.E. Hasse as Rittmeister Graf Ledenburg
- Maria Wimmer as Madeleine, Baronin Hügener
- Harry Meyen as Leutnant Robert Kroldt
- Rudolf Fernau as Baron Hügener, Rittergutsbesitzer
- Max Eckard as Unteroffizier Fritz Helbig
- Herbert Hübner as Major Paeschke, Kriegsgerichtsrat
- Franz Muxeneder as Ulan Graboviak, Bursche
- Wolfgang Büttner as Vizewachtmeister Queiss
- Annette Carell as Bettina von Laufen
- Otto Friebel
- Ellen Hille
- Bert Brandt
- Helmut Oeser
- Charles Regnier

== See also ==
- Curfew (1925)

== Bibliography ==
- Hans-Michael Bock and Tim Bergfelder. The Concise Cinegraph: An Encyclopedia of German Cinema. Berghahn Books, 2009.
