= Spider's Web (1989 film) =

- Directed by: Bernhard Wicki
- Written by: Wolfgang Kirchner; Joseph Roth; Bernhard Wicki
- Produced by: Peter Hahne
- Starring: Ulrich Mühe
- Cinematography: Gérard Vandenberg
- Edited by: Tanja Schmidbauer
- Release date: 21 September 1989
- Running time: 196 minutes
- Country: West Germany
- Language: German

Spider's Web (German: Das Spinnennetz) is a 1989 West German film directed by Bernhard Wicki. It is based on the 1923 novel by Joseph Roth. It was chosen as West Germany's official submission to the 62nd Academy Awards for Best Foreign Language Film, but did not manage to receive a nomination. The film was the last submission by West Germany, due to German reunification in 1990, Germany competed at the 63rd Academy Awards as a single country.

The film was also entered into the 1989 Cannes Film Festival.

== Plot ==
The film centers on young right-wing Leutnant (lieutenant) Theodor Lohse (Ulrich Mühe) who suffers personal and national humiliation during the downfall of the German Empire and the subsequent German Revolution of 1918 as the aftermath of World War I. From then on he pledges revenge on all those he blames for the new times: Democrats, socialists, and Jews. Thus, he becomes increasingly active in the right-wing underground of the early Weimar Republic, joining an organization called "S II" (probably based on real-life Organisation Consul that was responsible for a number of political and anti-Semitic assassinations) where his immediate superior is Baron von Rastchuk (Armin Mueller-Stahl). Baron von Rastchuk brings Lohse in contact with Prince Heinrich in order to get Lohse employed, a favor for which the homosexual Prince demands one-time bodily obligingness from Lohse. In spite of his apparent shock and disgust, Lohse yields to the Prince out of his opportunism and willingness to please his superiors.

Lohse becomes a full-time spy for the organization, and with unprecedented, relentless opportunism and unscrupulousness he spies in on Communist plots, partakes in the organization's plans to undermine the new German democracy, and disposes of his own right-wing colleagues when he sees fit, all of which to serve his own plans of rising to the top within right-wing circles. During these activities he comes in contact with Benjamin Lenz (Klaus Maria Brandauer), a Jewish man dealing in information on all kinds of criminal and underground political proceedings who will always sell at the highest price, be it paid by left or right-wing conspirators or the police. In spite of Lohse's hatred of Jews, he finds Lenz's services useful, but soon finds himself at his mercy as Lenz through their collaboration finds out more and more about Lohse's schemes and spy activities.

When Lenz learns that Lohse ordered a pogrom of the local Jewish ghetto, he confronts the rather short and slim-built Lohse in private, beating him close to senselessness and almost forces Lohse to commit suicide by jumping out of a window, until he realizes that killing Lohse would not make him any better than the anti-Semite that had ordered the violence in the ghetto. Lohse then has his henchmen murder Lenz, also because he knew too much, by pushing him in front of an approaching train. The film ends in late 1923 with Lohse leaving a festivity of conservatives and monarchists, declaring that restoring the monarchy has by now become "old hat", and with glowing eyes he mentions a "new man" preparing a putsch in Munich to count on - a man named Adolf Hitler.

== Background ==
Set against the backdrop of the inflationary year of 1923, the film offers a comprehensive and detailed portrayal of the diverse social milieus in Berlin: the upper-class milieu in the home of the banker Efrussi, the lower-middle-class milieu of the Lohse family, the left-wing artistic and intellectual milieu, the Jewish Scheunenviertel, and the aristocratic Junker landowning milieu.

== Cast ==
- Ulrich Mühe - Theodor Lohse
- Klaus Maria Brandauer - Benjamin Lenz
- Armin Mueller-Stahl - Baron von Rastchuk
- Andrea Jonasson - Rahel Efrussi
- Corinna Kirchhoff - Else von Schlieffen
- Elisabeth Endriss - Anna
- Ullrich Haupt - Baron von Köckwitz
- Agnes Fink - Mutter Lohse
- András Fricsay - Klitsche
- Ernst Stötzner - Günter
- Peter Roggisch - Prince Heinrich
- Rolf Henniger - Aaron Efrussi
- Hans Korte - Geheimrat Hugenberg
- Kyra Mladeck - Frau von Köckwitz
- Hark Bohm - Dada-artist

== See also ==
- List of submissions to the 62nd Academy Awards for Best Foreign Language Film
- List of German submissions for the Academy Award for Best Foreign Language Film
