= The Glass Tower =

1957 film

- Directed by: Harald Braun
- Written by: Odo Krohmann; Wolfgang Köppen; Harald Braun
- Produced by: Hans Abich; Franz Wagner
- Starring: Lilli Palmer; O.E. Hasse; Peter van Eyck
- Cinematography: Friedl Behn-Grund
- Edited by: Hilwa von Boro
- Music by: Werner Eisbrenner
- Production company: Bavaria Film
- Distributed by: Bavaria Film
- Release date: 24 October 1957
- Running time: 104 minutes
- Country: West Germany
- Language: German

The Glass Tower (German: Der gläserne Turm) is a 1957 West German drama film directed by Harald Braun and starring Lilli Palmer, O.E. Hasse and Peter van Eyck. It was made by Bavaria Film at their studios in Munich. The film's sets were designed by the art director Walter Haag. Palmer plays the role of an adulterous socialite.

== Cast ==
- Lilli Palmer as Katja Fleming
- O.E. Hasse as Robert Fleming
- Peter van Eyck as John Lawrence
- Brigitte Horney as Dr. Bruning
- Hannes Messemer as Dr. Krell
- Ludwig Linkmann as Blume
- Gerd Brüdern as Prosecutor
- Fritz Hinz-Fabricius as Gerichts-Präsident
- Else Ehser as Mrs. Wiedecke
- Werner Stock as Wendland
- Ewald Wenck as Policeman
- Gaby Fehling as Sister Margarethe

== Bibliography ==
- Bock, Hans-Michael; Bergfelder, Tim, eds. (2009). The Concise Cinegraph: Encyclopaedia of German Cinema. Berghahn Books. ISBN 978-1-57181-655-9.
