= Beloved Enemy (1955 film) =

1955 film

- Directed by: Rolf Hansen
- Written by: Maria von Kirchbach (novel); Jacob Geis; Juliane Kay
- Produced by: Harald Braun; Georg Richter
- Starring: Ruth Leuwerik; Werner Hinz; Thomas Holtzmann
- Cinematography: Friedl Behn-Grund
- Edited by: Anna Höllering
- Music by: Mark Lothar
- Production company: Neue Deutsche Filmgesellschaft
- Distributed by: DFH
- Release date: 18 March 1955
- Running time: 100 minutes
- Country: West Germany
- Language: German

Beloved Enemy (German: Geliebte Feindin) is a 1955 West German historical drama film directed by Rolf Hansen and starring Ruth Leuwerik, Werner Hinz and Thomas Holtzmann. The film's plot was loosely inspired by the Fashoda Incident of 1898. It was shot at the Bavaria Studios in Munich, with location filming taking place in Cairo and the Saqqara. The film's sets were designed by the art director Robert Herlth.

== Synopsis ==
In a Sudanese city located on the Nile, the British consul encourages his wife to cultivate the acquaintanceship of a Sergeant in the French Foreign Legion in the hope she can find out about French military plans in the region.

== Cast ==
- Ruth Leuwerik as Violante Gore
- Werner Hinz as Gerald Gore, englischer Konsul
- Thomas Holtzmann as Sergeant Charly Brown
- Gustav Knuth as Soldat Horner
- Bruni Löbel as Aimée, Kabarettistin
- Rolf Henniger as Hauptmann Jules Ambéry
- Hans Quest as Ward, Sekretär bei Gore
- Hilde Weissner as Mrs. Trapp
- Friedrich Domin as Mr. Trapp
- Lina Carstens as Mrs. Durham
- Otto Brüggemann as Major Gontard
- Erika Remberg as Nadja
- Wolf Ackva as Allaine, französischer Konsul
- Adolf Ziegler as Caldwell, Butler bei Gore
- Brigitte Stanzel as Bessy Gore, die Tochter
- Wolf-Dieter Maurer as Ronald Gore, der Sohn
- Leonard Steckel as Oberst Junot

== Bibliography ==
- Hans-Michael Bock and Tim Bergfelder. The Concise Cinegraph: An Encyclopedia of German Cinema. Berghahn Books, 2009.
