= Jacob Geis =

German screenwriter

- Born: 30 November 1890; Munich, Germany
- Died: 22 July 1972 (aged 81); Munich, Germany
- Occupations: Theatre director Screenwriter; Film producer
- Years active: 1935-1959

Jacob Geis (30 November 1890 – 22 July 1972) was a German theatre director, screenwriter and film producer. He wrote for 35 films between 1935 and 1959.

== Selected filmography ==
- The Model Husband (1937)
- Secret Mission (1938)
- Five Million Look for an Heir (1938)
- The Roundabouts of Handsome Karl (1938)
- Drei Unteroffiziere (1939)
- Uproar in Damascus (1939)
- The Way to Freedom (1941)
- Between Heaven and Earth (1942)
- Nora (1944)
- The Song of the Nightingale (1944)
- Between Yesterday and Tomorrow (1947)
- Keepers of the Night (1949)
- The Appeal to Conscience (1949)
- The Falling Star (1950)
- The Exchange (1952)
- Red Roses, Red Lips, Red Wine (1953)
- A Girl Without Boundaries (1955)
- Beloved Enemy (1955)
- Regine (1956)
- The Model Husband (1956)
- All Roads Lead Home (1957)
- The Buddenbrooks (1959)
