= Armin Dahlen =

Austrian actor

- Born: 14 October 1919; Wolfsberg, Carinthia, Austria
- Died: 26 July 2013 (aged 93)
- Other name: Armin Schiestl
- Occupations: Actor, director
- Years active: 1949–1988 (film & TV)

Armin Dahlen (14 October 1919 – 26 July 2013) was an Austrian actor. He also directed for television. He starred in the 1954 Ealing Studios drama The Divided Heart. He died in July 2013 at the age of 93.

== Selected filmography ==
- White Gold (1949) - Konrad, deren Sohn
- The Cloister of Martins (1951) - Rimiger
- The White Adventure (1952) - Skilehrer Fasser (uncredited)
- Heimat Bells (1952) - Mathias Brucker
- Two People (1952) - Christian
- Roses Bloom on the Moorland (1952) - Ludwig Amelung, Architekt
- Young Heart Full of Love (1953) - Junglehrer Gstreiner
- Das Kreuz am Jägersteig (1954) - Andreas
- The Divided Heart (1954) - Franz
- The Phantom of the Big Tent (1954) - Lal Singh, Mann mit dem Elefanten
- 08/15 – Part 2 (1955) - Infanterie-Major
- You Can No Longer Remain Silent (1955) - Bjarne Lon
- Das Erbe vom Pruggerhof (1956) - Georg Marquardt, Bildhauer
- The Golden Bridge (1956) - Hellborg
- Where the Ancient Forests Rustle (1956) - Toni Burgstaller
- Der Schandfleck (1956) - Der Almhofbauer
- War of the Maidens (1957) - Gustav Kugler, Frächter
- Der Pfarrer von St. Michael (1957) - Georg Santner
- Jägerblut (1957) - Ludwig Angerer
- The Green Devils of Monte Cassino (1958) - Pater Emmanuel
- Blitzmädels an die Front (1958) - Hauptmann
- Worüber man nicht spricht - Frauenarzt Dr. Brand greift ein (1958) - Priester
- Stalingrad: Dogs, Do You Want to Live Forever? (1959) - Major Stanescu
- Die zornigen jungen Männer (1960) - Karlebach
- The Transport (1961) - Feldwebel Steinlein
- Murder Party (1961)- Kriminalassistent #1
- The Longest Day (1962) - Blumentritt's Adjutant (uncredited)
- Als ich noch der Waldbauernbub war... (1963, TV film) - Lorenz Rosegger
- Aus meiner Waldheimat (1963, TV film) - Lorenz Rosegger
- Als ich beim Käthele im Wald war (1963, TV film) - Lorenz Rosegger
- No Survivors, Please (1964)
- Rinaldo Rinaldini (1968–1969, TV series) - Fra Donato

== Bibliography ==
- Fritsche, Maria. Homemade Men in Postwar Austrian Cinema: Nationhood, Genre and Masculinity. Berghahn Books, 2013.
