= Redhead (1962 film) =

1962 film directed by Helmut Käutner

- Film poster
- Directed by: Helmut Käutner
- Written by: Helmut Käutner; Alfred Andersch
- Based on: Redhead by Alfred Andersch
- Produced by: Hermann Höhn; Walter Koppel; Carlo Ponti
- Starring: Ruth Leuwerik; Rossano Brazzi; Giorgio Albertazzi
- Cinematography: Otello Martelli
- Edited by: Klaus Dudenhöfer
- Music by: Emilia Zanetti
- Production companies: Compagnia Cinematografica Champion; Real Film
- Distributed by: Europa-Filmverleih
- Release date: 30 June 1962
- Running time: 100 minutes
- Countries: West Germany; Italy
- Language: German

Redhead (German: Die Rote, Italian: La rossa) is a 1962 West German-Italian thriller film directed by Helmut Käutner and starring Ruth Leuwerik, Rossano Brazzi and Giorgio Albertazzi. It was shot at the Tirrenia Studios in Tuscany and on location in Milan and Venice. The film's sets were designed by the art directors Saverio D'Eugenio and Robert Stratil. The film was adapted from the novel of the same title by Alfred Andersch. It was entered into the 12th Berlin International Film Festival.

== Synopsis ==
German wife Franziska is bored with her life and her marriage to the businessman Herbert. On a trip to Milan she decides to flee and start afresh, and heads to Venice. There she goes to stay in a hotel and encounters Patrick O'Malley, a charming British man she ultimately comes to realise is using her in his pursuit of the former Nazi official Kramer. Meanwhile she also meets an Italian violinist Fabio. Ultimately, she abandons her new life in Venice and returns home.

== Cast ==
- Ruth Leuwerik as Franziska Lukas
- Rossano Brazzi as Fabio
- Giorgio Albertazzi as Patrick O'Malley
- Harry Meyen as Herbert Lukas
- Richard Münch as Joachim
- Gert Fröbe as Kramer
- Gianni Solaro as Salesman
- Giovanni Rossi as Jeweler
- Enzo Ranchetti as Luigi
- Antonio Acqua as Library doorman
- Andrea Miami

== Bibliography ==
- Bock, Hans-Michael & Bergfelder, Tim. The Concise CineGraph. Encyclopedia of German Cinema. Berghahn Books, 2009.
- Goble, Alan. The Complete Index to Literary Sources in Film. Walter de Gruyter, 1999.
