= Roses in Autumn =

1955 film directed by Rudolf Jugert

- Directed by: Rudolf Jugert
- Written by: Horst Budjuhn
- Based on: Effi Briest by Theodor Fontane
- Produced by: Utz Utermann
- Starring: Ruth Leuwerik; Bernhard Wicki; Carl Raddatz
- Cinematography: Werner Krien
- Edited by: Elisabeth Kleinert-Neumann
- Music by: Franz Grothe
- Production company: Divina Film
- Distributed by: Gloria Film
- Release date: 29 September 1955
- Running time: 107 minutes
- Country: West Germany
- Language: German

Roses in Autumn (German: Rosen im Herbst) is a 1955 West German historical drama film directed by Rudolf Jugert and starring Ruth Leuwerik, Bernhard Wicki, Carl Raddatz and Lil Dagover. It is based on the 1894 novel Effi Briest by Theodor Fontane. It was shot in Eastmancolor at the Bavaria Studios in Munich. The film's sets were designed by the art director Walter Haag and Hans Kutzner. Location shooting took place around Göttingen in Lower Saxony and the island of Sylt in Schleswig-Holstein.

== Cast ==
- Ruth Leuwerik as Effi Briest
- Bernhard Wicki as Geert von Innstetten
- Paul Hartmann as Mr. von Briest
- Carl Raddatz as Major von Crampas
- Lil Dagover as Mrs. von Briest
- Lotte Brackebusch as Roswitha - Kindermädchen
- Günther Lüders as Alonzo Gieshübler
- Margot Trooger as Johanna - Haushälterin
- Heinz Hilpert as Minister von Cramer
- Eva Vaitl as Mrs. von Cramer
- Lola Müthel as Marietta Tripelli
- Hans Cossy as Mr. von Wüllersdorf
- Hedwig Wangel as Konsulin Rhode
- Willem Holsboer as Reverend Lindequist
- Maria Krahn as Mrs. Lindequist
- Barbara Born as Anni von Innstetten
- Gundel Thormann as Sidonie von Grasenabb
- Antoinette von Kitzing as Mädchen
- Hans-Jürgen von Kitzing as Kutscher

== Bibliography ==
- Bock, Hans-Michael & Bergfelder, Tim. The Concise CineGraph. Encyclopedia of German Cinema. Berghahn Books, 2009.
- Goble, Alan. The Complete Index to Literary Sources in Film. Walter de Gruyter, 1999.
- Peucker, Brigitte. A Companion to Rainer Werner Fassbinder. John Wiley & Sons, 2012.
