= Tonio Kröger (film) =

1964 film

- Film poster
- Directed by: Rolf Thiele
- Written by: Ennio Flaiano; Erika Mann; Thomas Mann
- Produced by: Hans Abich; Franz Seitz
- Starring: Jean-Claude Brialy
- Cinematography: Wolf Wirth
- Edited by: Heidi Genée
- Music by: Rolf Alexander Wilhelm
- Production company: Filmaufbau
- Distributed by: Schorcht Filmverleih
- Release date: June 1964
- Running time: 90 minutes
- Countries: West Germany; France
- Language: German
- Budget: $400,000

Tonio Kröger is a 1964 West German historical drama film directed by Rolf Thiele, based on the 1903 novella of the same name by Thomas Mann. It was entered into the 14th Berlin International Film Festival. It was shot at the Tempelhof Studios in Berlin. The film's sets were designed by the art director Wolf Englert.

== Cast ==
- Jean-Claude Brialy as Tonio Kröger
- Nadja Tiller as Lisaweta Iwanowna
- Werner Hinz as Consul Kröger
- Anaid Iplicjian as Frau Kröger
- Rudolf Forster as Herr Seehaase
- Walter Giller as Merchant
- Theo Lingen as Knaak
- Adeline Wagner as Woman
- Beppo Brem as Adalbert Prantl
- Rosemarie Lucke as Inge Holm
- Elisabeth Klettenhauer as Girl
- Mathieu Carrière as Tonio as a Boy
- Gert Fröbe as Policeman Peterson
