= Murder Party (1961 film) =

1961 film

- Directed by: Helmuth Ashley
- Screenplay by: Thomas Keck; Helmuth Ashley
- Based on: Le jeu de l'assassin by Max Pierre Schaeffer
- Produced by: Claus Hardt; Utz Utermann
- Starring: Magali Noël; Harry Meyen; Götz George
- Cinematography: Sven Nykvist
- Edited by: Walter Boos
- Music by: Martin Böttcher
- Production companies: Bavaria Film; Société des Films Gibé S.A.; Filmaufbau
- Distributed by: Bavaria Film
- Release date: 19 October 1961
- Running time: 84 minutes
- Countries: West Germany; France
- Language: German

Murder Party or Murder Game (German: Mörderspiel, French: Le jeu de l'assassin) is a 1961 mystery crime film directed by Helmut Ashley and starring Magali Noël, Harry Meyen and Götz George. It was shot at the Bavaria Studios in Munich. The film's sets were designed by the art directors Herbert Strabel and Rolf Zehetbauer. It featured at the 1962 Locarno Film Festival.

== Synopsis ==
A group of wealthy bored figures play a game of "murder" at a party. One of them, a killer, uses this as a chance of planting a real body.

== Cast ==
- Magali Noël as Eva Troger
- Harry Meyen as Klaus Troger
- Götz George as Hein Kersten
- Hanne Wieder as Journalistin Cornelia
- Wolfgang Reichmann as Dr. Rosen
- Anita Höfer as Babsy Lenz
- Georges Rivière as Dahlberg
- Margot Hielscher as Claudia Ahrends
- Heinz Klevenow as Hauser
- Uschi Siebert as Margit Hauser
- Wolfgang Kieling as Kriminalinspektor Arnold
- Ruth Grossi as Frau Rosen
- Armin Dahlen as Kriminalassistent #1
- Balduin Baas as Diener Arthur
- Hans Paetsch as Kriminalkommissar Ullmann
- Robert Graf as Dr. Horn

== Bibliography ==
- Bock, Hans-Michael & Bergfelder, Tim. The Concise CineGraph. Encyclopedia of German Cinema. Berghahn Books, 2009.
- Dyer, Richard. Lethal Repetition: Serial Killing in European Cinema. British Film Institute, 2015.
- Goble, Alan. The Complete Index to Literary Sources in Film. Walter de Gruyter, 1999.
