= Sweetheart of the Gods =

1960 film

- Directed by: Gottfried Reinhardt
- Written by: George Hurdalek
- Produced by: Artur Brauner; Wolf Brauner
- Starring: Ruth Leuwerik; Peter van Eyck; Harry Meyen; Robert Graf
- Cinematography: Göran Strindberg
- Edited by: Walter Wischniewsky
- Music by: Franz Grothe
- Production company: CCC Film
- Distributed by: Bavaria Film
- Release date: 12 April 1960
- Running time: 99 minutes
- Country: West Germany
- Language: German

Sweetheart of the Gods (German: Liebling der Götter) is a 1960 West German biographical film directed by Gottfried Reinhardt and starring Ruth Leuwerik, Peter van Eyck, and Harry Meyen. The film portrays the life of Renate Müller, a German film actress who died in 1937 in mysterious circumstances. A variety of rumours about Müller's death had developed, but the filmmakers chose to portray it as suicide following Nazi pressure over her relationship with a Jewish diplomat. Following legal objections from Müller's family, the ending was toned down to make her final fate more vague.

Leuwerik recreates scenes and songs from several of Müller's films. However their star personae were very different, with Müller famous as a girl-next-door while Leuwerik played the role in her more usual refined fashion. Although set in the 1930s, stylistically the film often resembles the late 1950s. Willy Fritsch, a German star of the 1930s who had acted alongside Müller in two films, appears in a small role.

It was shot at the Spandau Studios in Berlin with sets designed by the art directors Paul Markwitz and Fritz Maurischat. The film was moderately successful commercially on its release in West Germany.

== Cast ==
- Ruth Leuwerik as Renate Müller
- Peter van Eyck as Dr. Hans Simon
- Harry Meyen as Volker Hellberg
- Robert Graf as Dr. Hertel
- Hannelore Schroth as Uschi Gunzel
- Leonard Steckel as Furst
- Willy Fritsch as Gunzel
- Werner Fuetterer as Harry de Cassian
- Friedrich Domin as Herr Matthieu
- Lia Eibenschütz as Frau Simon
- Elsa Wagner as Frau Lengefeld
- Willy Krause as Goebbels
- Hans W. Hamacher as Minister
- Bruno W. Pantel as Juwelier Artinger
- Albert Bessler as Ministerialrat
- Tilly Lauenstein
- Walter Clemens
- Eva Maria Brock
- Arthur Schilsky
- Karin Evans

== Bibliography ==
- Bergfelder, Tim (2005) [2004]. International Adventures: German Popular Cinema and European Co-Productions in the 1960s. New York: Berghahn Books. ISBN 978-1-57181-539-2.
