= George Hurdalek =

German screenwriter

- Born: 6 February 1908; Görlitz, Silesia, Prussia, Germany
- Died: 15 June 1980 (aged 72); Munich, Bavaria, West Germany
- Occupations: Screenwriter; Film director
- Years active: 1934–1975

George Hurdalek (6 February 1908, Görlitz, Germany – 15 June 1980, Munich, Germany) was a German screenwriter. He wrote for more than 40 films between 1934 and 1975.

The opening credits of The Sound of Music (1965) include a credit reading, "With the partial use of ideas by Georg Hurdalek." Hurdalek wrote the screenplay for The Trapp Family (1956), a German-language film that provided the basis for both the stage and screen versions of The Sound of Music.

== Selected filmography ==
- The Valiant Navigator (1935)
- The King's Prisoner (1935)
- Women for Golden Hill (1938)
- Five Million Look for an Heir (1938)
- Front Theatre (1942)
- Voice of the Heart (1942)
- The Time with You (1948, director)
- The Sergeant's Daughter (1952, director)
- His Royal Highness (1953)
- Ludwig II (1955)
- The Last Man (1955)
- Without You All Is Darkness (1956)
- The Trapp Family (1956)
- Queen Louise (1957)
- Goodbye, Franziska (1957)
- Iron Gustav (1958, director)
- Sweetheart of the Gods (1960)
- Our House in Cameroon (1961)
- The Last Chapter (1961)
- Town Without Pity (1961)
- The Indian Scarf (1963)
- Jailbreak in Hamburg (1971)
- My Father, the Ape and I (1971)
- Crime After School (1975)
