= You Don't Shoot at Angels =

1960 film

- Directed by: Rolf Thiele
- Written by: Oliver Hassencamp; Miguel Mihura (play); Rolf Thiele
- Produced by: Werner Fischer; Utz Utermann
- Starring: Ruth Leuwerik; Hannes Messemer; Gustav Knuth
- Cinematography: Göran Strindberg
- Edited by: Margot von Schlieffen
- Music by: Martin Böttcher
- Production company: Divina-Film
- Distributed by: Gloria Film
- Release date: 23 December 1960
- Running time: 99 minutes
- Country: West Germany
- Language: German

You Don't Shoot at Angels (German: Auf Engel schießt man nicht) is a 1960 West German comedy crime film directed by Rolf Thiele and starring Ruth Leuwerik, Hannes Messemer and Gustav Knuth.

The film's sets were designed by the art directors Robert Herlth and Robert Stratil. It was shot at the Bavaria Studios in Munich and on location in Naples.

== Cast ==
- Ruth Leuwerik as Maria
- Hannes Messemer as Suarez
- Gustav Knuth as Carlos
- Boy Gobert as Federico
- Bruno Hübner as Cosme
- Ilse Steppat as Bellini
- Ina Duscha as Nuria
- Peer Schmidt as Kommissar
- Ida Ehre as Äbtissin

== See also ==
- Peaches in Syrup (1960)
