= Friedrich Domin =

German actor (1902–1961)

- Born: 15 May 1902; Beuthen, German Empire (now Bytom, Poland)
- Died: 18 December 1961 (aged 59); Munich, West Germany
- Occupation: Actor
- Years active: 1939–1961

Friedrich Domin (15 May 1902 – 18 December 1961) was a German film actor. He appeared in more than 60 films between 1939 and 1961. He was born in Beuthen, Germany (now Bytom, Poland) and died in Munich, West Germany.

In 1922, he graduated from the Max Reinhardt's drama school, now known as Ernst Busch Academy of Dramatic Arts.

He was awarded the honor state actor in 1939, and in 1944 he was included in the Gottbegnadeten list, created by Joseph Goebbels, as an "irreplacable actor" to the continuation of Nazi film production.

== Selected filmography ==
- The Desert Song (1939) - Sir Collins, ihr Stiefvater
- Der siebente Junge (1941) - Baron Florian von Roeckel
- The Comedians (1941) - Johann Neuber
- Alarmstufe V (1941) - Prof. Crusius
- The Little Residence (1942) - Waldemar Prinz von Lauffenberg
- Fünftausend Mark Belohnung (1942) - Joachim Wengraf
- The Endless Road (1943) - Fürst Metternich
- Don't Talk to Me About Love (1943) - Van Italy
- Melusine (1944) - Professor von Hardegg
- Wo ist Herr Belling? (1945) - Dr. Fiedler
- In the Temple of Venus (1948) - Richard Doysen
- The Last Illusion (1949) - Prof. Helfert
- Trouble Backstairs (1949) - Justizrat Dr. Horn, sein Vater
- Regimental Music (1950) - Herr von Wahl
- Nacht ohne Sünde (1950) - Professor Rackmann
- Die Tat des Anderen (1951)
- Das seltsame Leben des Herrn Bruggs (1951) - Bankdirektor Reisch
- Die Frauen des Herrn S. (1951) - Mazedonischer General
- The Sergeant's Daughter (1952) - Wachtmeister Volkhardt
- The Great Temptation (1952) - Dr. Frank, Verteidiger
- The Divorcée (1953) - Gerichtsvorsitzender
- Meines Vaters Pferde (1954, part 1, 2) - Professor
- The Abduction of the Sabine Women (1954) - Dichter
- Cabaret (1954) - Paul Lincke
- Sauerbruch – Das war mein Leben (1954) - Paul von Hindenburgh
- Hubertus Castle (1954) - Graf Egge
- The Confession of Ina Kahr (1954) - Vater Stoll
- Ludwig II (1955) - Otto von Bismarck
- Marianne of My Youth (1955) - Professor
- Beloved Enemy (1955) - Mr. Trapp
- Eine Frau genügt nicht? (1955)
- Love's Carnival (1955) - Kommerzienrat Wagner
- Lola Montès (1955) - Circus Manager
- The Girl from Flanders (1956) - Maj. Gen Leopold Haller, Alex's Father
- San Salvatore (1956) - Dr. Breymann
- The Captain from Köpenick (1956) - Jail Director
- The Trapp Family (1956) - Gruber, Bankier
- Heiße Ernte (1956) - Rudolf Stammer
- Kleiner Mann – ganz groß (1957) - Theodor Krüger
- Queen Louise (1957) - Herzog von Mecklenburg-Strelitz
- Goodbye, Franziska (1957) - Professor Thiemann
- Der Edelweißkönig (1957) - Untersuchungsrichter
- The Big Chance (1957) - Bischof
- Immer wenn der Tag beginnt (1957) - Professor Wächter
- ...und nichts als die Wahrheit (1958) - Dr. Fein, Strafverteidiger
- Worüber man nicht spricht - Frauenarzt Dr. Brand greift ein (1958) - Professor Julius Gruber
- Die Landärztin vom Tegernsee (1958) - Pfarrer
- The Ideal Woman (1959) - Justizrat Becker
- The Man Who Walked Through the Wall (1959) - Psychiater (uncredited)
- Ja, so ein Mädchen mit sechzehn (1959) - Franz Vidal
- Heimat, deine Lieder (1959) - Gärtner Kummernus
- Sweetheart of the Gods (1960) - Herr Matthieu
- Carnival Confession (1960) - Canon Henrici
- A Woman for Life (1960) - Vater Heinemann
- Das schwarze Schaf (1960) - Bischof
