= Bernhard Wicki =

Austrian-Swiss actor, director and writer

- Born: 28 October 1919; St. Pölten, Austria
- Died: 5 January 2000 (aged 80); Munich, Germany
- Occupations: Actor; Film director
- Years active: 1940–1994

Bernhard Wolfgang Wicki (28 October 1919 – 5 January 2000) was an Austrian-Swiss actor, film director and screenwriter. He was a key figure in the revitalization of post-war German-language cinema, particularly in West Germany, and also directed several Hollywood films.

His works as a director include his debut 1959 anti-war film Die Brücke, the religious drama The Miracle of Father Malachia (1961), the Friedrich Dürrenmatt adaptation The Visit (1964), and the German segments of the World War II epic The Longest Day (1962). He won four German Film Awards for Best Direction.

== Life and career ==
Wicki studied in the city of Breslau such topics as art history, history and German literature. In 1938, he transferred to the drama school of the Staatliches Schauspielhaus in Berlin. In 1939, because of his membership in the Bündische Jugend, he was imprisoned for many months in the Sachsenhausen concentration camp. After his release, he moved to Vienna, then in 1944 to Switzerland.

After World War II, he starred in many films, including Die letzte Brücke (1953) and Es geschah am 20. Juli (1955). He was also a photographer. His first attempt at directing came three years later with the documentary Warum sind sie gegen uns? (1958). He became internationally famous with his 1959 anti-war film Die Brücke, which was nominated for the Academy Award for Best Foreign Language Film. In 1961 he won the Silver Bear for Best Director at the 11th Berlin International Film Festival for his film The Miracle of Father Malachia. His break in Hollywood came shortly thereafter when he was chosen to direct Marlon Brando and Yul Brynner in the highly acclaimed World War II espionage thriller, Morituri in 1965.

Wicki was a patron of the International Film Festival in Emden-Norderney, which first started in 1990.

Wicki first married Agnes Fink, a fellow acting colleague, and later married Elisabeth Endriss, also a colleague. In the documentary Verstörung – und eine Art von Poesie (June 2007), Elisabeth Wicki-Endriss portrayed Wicki's life and work.

Wicki is buried at the Nymphenburger cemetery in Munich (grave number 4-1-23).

In 2001, the Bernhard Wicki Memorial Fund was established in Munich. Since 2002, it has awarded a yearly prize, The Bridge, to selected films that promote peace. A further prize of 15,000 euros, endowed in 2006, is presented in his name in the city of Emden.

== Selected filmography ==
Director

- Warum sind sie gegen uns? (1958)
- Die Brücke (1959)
- The Miracle of Father Malachia (1961)
- The Longest Day (with Ken Annakin and Andrew Marton) (1962)
- The Visit (1964)
- Morituri (1965)
- Das falsche Gewicht (1971)
- Karpfs Karriere (1971)
- The Conquest of the Citadel (1977)
- Grünstein's Clever Move (1984)
- Sansibar oder der letzte Grund (1987)
- Spider's Web (1989)

Actor

- Der Postmeister (1940) – Statist (uncredited)
- The Falling Star (1950) – Otto
- Young Heart Full of Love (1953) – Vitus Zingerl
- The Last Bridge (1954) – Boro
- Circus of Love (1954) – Franz
- Prisoners of Love (1954) – Franz Martens
- The Mosquito (1954) – Hugo
- A Double Life (1954) – Rainer von Hohenburg
- The Eternal Waltz (1954) – Johann Strauß Sohn
- Children, Mother, and the General (1955) – Hauptmann Dornberg
- Jackboot Mutiny (1955) – Oberst Graf v. Stauffenberg
- Du mein stilles Tal (1955) – Erik Linden
- Roses in Autumn (1955) – Geert von Innstetten
- Fruit Without Love (1956) – Dr. Kolb
- Weil du arm bist, mußt du früher sterben (1956) – Dr. Grüter
- Skandal um Dr. Vlimmen (1956) – Dr. Jan Vlimmen
- Queen Louise (1957) – Zar Alexander
- Flucht in die Tropennacht (1957) – Robert
- The Zurich Engagement (1957) – Paul Frank
- Es wird alles wieder gut (1957) – Unterhaltungschef Dr. Johann Krapp
- Escape from Sahara (1958) – Luigi Locatelli
- The Cat (1958) – Bernard Werner
- Restless Night (1958) – Priest Brunner
- Frauensee (1958) – Karl Anton Graf Chur
- Frau im besten Mannesalter (1959) – Tex Richards
- Stage Fright (1960) – Rohrbach
- La Notte (1961) – Tommaso Garani
- Of Wayward Love (1962) – Hans (segment "Il serpente")
- Eleven Years and One Day (1963) – Karl Rodenbach
- Portuguese Vacation (1963) – Bernard
- Count Oederland (1968, TV Movie) – Prosecutor / Count Oederland
- Your Caresses (1969) – Father
- Carlos (1971, TV Movie) – Philipp
- Crime and Passion (1976) – Rolf
- Derrick (1977, Season 4, Episode 3: "Eine Nacht im Oktober") – Dr. Lechner
- The Glass Cell (1978) – Police Commissioner Österreicher
- Despair (1978) – Orlovius
- The Left-Handed Woman (1978) – Verleger
- The Man in the Rushes (1978) – Sir Gerald
- Death Watch (1980) – Katherine's Dad
- Derrick (1980, Season 7, Episode 9: "Zeuge Yuroski") – Karl Yurowski
- In the Land of Cockaigne (1981, TV Movie) – James Türkheimer
- Domino (1982) – Lehrter
- The Mysterious Stranger (1982, TV Movie) – Heinrich Stein
- Spring Symphony (1983) – Baron von Fricken
- A Love in Germany (1983) – Dr. Borg
- Dangerous Moves (1984) – Pühl
- Paris, Texas (1984) – Doctor Ulmer
- Bereg (1984) – Weber, Verleger
- A Kind of Anger (1984, TV Movie) – Philipp Sanger
- Mary Ward (1985) – George Abbot
- Killing Cars (1986) – Von der Mühle
- Spider's Web (1989) – Herr Waizenbaum
- The Betrothed (1989, TV Miniseries) – Gentleman's Father
- Martha and I (1990) – Narrator (scenes deleted)
- Success (1991) – Bichler
- Das Geheimnis (1993) – Dr. Virgil Schwarz
- Prinzenbad (1993) – Dany

== Decorations and awards ==
- 1958: Film Award in Silver (documentary) for Warum sind sie gegen uns? (Why they are against us?)
- 1960: The Golden Bowl, Film Award (Director), German Film Critics Award, German Youth Film Award, Golden Globe and an Academy Award nomination (Best Foreign Film) for Die Brücke (The Bridge)
- 1960: United Nations award for contribution to peace
- 1961: Silver Bear at the Berlin Film Festival (Best Director) for The Miracle of Father Malachia
- 1962: Bambi
- 1972: Golden Camera (Director) and Film Award (Director) for Das falsche Gewicht (The wrong weight)
- 1976: Film Award for many years of excellent work in the German film industry
- 1977: Film Award in Silver for The Conquest of the Citadel
- 1979: St. Jakob Prandtauer Prize for Science and Art of the city of St Pölten
- 1982: Great Cross of Merit of the Federal Republic of Germany
- 1985: Film Award (Director) for Die Grünstein-Variante (The greenstone variant)
- 1986: Helmut Käutner Award
- 1986: Critics Award for Die Grünstein-Variante
- 1988: Adolf Grimme Award for Sansibar oder Der letzte Grund (Zanzibar or The last Reason)
- 1989: Film Award (Special Film Award 40 years Federal Republic of Germany) for Die Brücke
- 1989: Bavarian Film Award
- 1989: Honorary Award of the Abendzeitung (Evening Paper)
- 1989: Academy Award nomination (Best Foreign Film) and Film Award (Director) for The Spider's Web
- 1990: Berlin International Film Festival: Berlinale Camera
- 1990: Schwabing Art Prize (prize)
- 1992: Universum Film AG prize
- 1992: Bavarian Order of Merit
- 1998: DIVA Award
- 1999: Medal "Munich shines" in gold
- 2000: Austrian Cross of Honour for Science and Art, 1st class
