= Werner Krien =

German cinematographer

Werner Krien (7 March 1912 – 6 March 1975) was a German cinematographer.

== Selected filmography ==
- Black Roses (1935)
- Women for Golden Hill (1938)
- Triad (1938)
- The Strange Monsieur Victor (1938)
- Twelve Minutes After Midnight (1939)
- Detours to Happiness (1939)
- Riding for Germany (1941)
- Annelie (1941)
- Above All Else in the World (1941)
- Münchhausen (1943)
- Große Freiheit Nr. 7 (1944)
- A Wife for Three Days (1944)
- Somewhere in Berlin (1946)
- And the Heavens Above Us (1947)
- Trouble Backstairs (1949)
- Tromba (1949)
- The Great Mandarin (1949)
- The Murder Trial of Doctor Jordan (1949)
- Beloved Liar (1950)
- Heart's Desire (1951)
- The House in Montevideo (1951)
- Hanna Amon (1951)
- Towers of Silence (1952)
- Ave Maria (1953)
- The Blue Hour (1953)
- His Royal Highness (1953)
- Portrait of an Unknown Woman (1954)
- One Woman Is Not Enough? (1955)
- Roses in Autumn (1955)
- The Golden Bridge (1956)
- Friederike von Barring (1956)
- Queen Louise (1957)
- Salzburg Stories (1957)
- Goodbye, Franziska (1957)
- The Trapp Family in America (1958)
- A Woman Who Knows What She Wants (1958)
- Marili (1959)
- The Ideal Woman (1959)
- Bombs on Monte Carlo (1960)
- La Bohème (1965)

== Bibliography ==
- Shandley, Robert R. Rubble Films: German Cinema in the Shadow of the Third Reich. Temple University Press, 2001.
