= Antje Weisgerber =

German actress

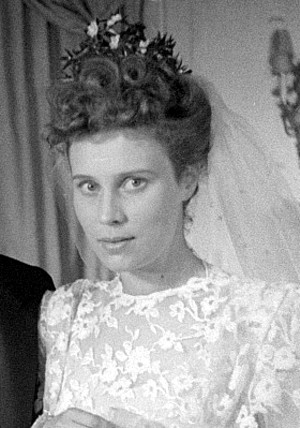
- Weisberber in 1946
- Born: 17 May 1922; Königsberg, East Prussia, Weimar Germany
- Died: 29 September 2004 (aged 82); Dortmund, Germany
- Occupation: Actress
- Spouse: Horst Caspar

Antje Weisgerber (17 April 1922 – 29 September 2004) was a German film and television actress, and the wife of actor Horst Caspar.

== Selected filmography ==
- Two Worlds (1940)
- The White Hell of Pitz Palu (1950)
- Two Times Lotte (1950)
- The Stronger Woman (1953)
- Captain Wronski (1954)
- Before God and Man (1955)
- The Ambassador's Wife (1955)
- San Salvatore (1956)
- Melody of the Heart (1956)
- Melody of the Heath (1956)
- The Man Who Sold Himself (1959)
- Stage Fright (1960)
- The Oil Prince (1965)
- As You Like It (1970)
