= Stage Fright (1960 film) =

- Directed by: Kurt Hoffmann
- Written by: Heinz Pauck; Hans Schweikart
- Produced by: Hans Abich; Heinz Angermeyer
- Starring: Dunja Movar; Bernhard Wicki; Antje Weisgerber
- Cinematography: Sven Nykvist
- Edited by: Hilwa von Boro
- Music by: Franz Grothe
- Production company: Filmaufbau
- Distributed by: Constantin Film
- Release date: 3 March 1960
- Running time: 95 minutes
- Country: West Germany
- Language: German

Stage Fright or Lamp Fever (German: Lampenfieber) is a 1960 West German drama film directed by Kurt Hoffmann and starring Dunja Movar, Bernhard Wicki and Antje Weisgerber.

It was shot at the Bavaria Studios in Munich. The film's sets were designed by the art director Elisabeth Urbancic.

== Cast ==
- Dunja Movar as Gitta Crusius
- Bernhard Wicki as Rohrbach
- Antje Weisgerber as Elsa Kaiser
- Gustav Knuth as Herr Seipel
- Anne Kersten as Frau Wehrhahn
- Henry Vahl as Herr Körner
- Eva Vaitl as Frau Seipel
- Elke Sommer as Evelyne
- Claus Wilcke as Bastian
- Corinna Genest as Katja
- Gitty Djamal as Elisabeth
- Dieter Klein as Caspar
- Michael Hinz as Peter
- Inken Deter as Grete Seipel
- Helmut Förnbacher as Thomas
- Erna Sellmer as Kantinenwirtin Hochgesell
- Dieter Hildebrandt as Atze Müller
- Hans Schweikart as Intendant
- Peter Striebeck as 1. Schauspielschüler
- Klaus Dahlen as 2. Schauspielschüler
- Peter Kors as Schauspieler in Kernstadt
- Peter Paul as Schauspieler in Kernstadt
- Werner Schwuchow as Schauspieler in Kernstadt
- Minna Spaeth as Schauspielerin in Kernstadt
- Paul Bürks as himself
- Hans Clarin as himself
- August Everding as himself
- Erwin Faber as himself
- Veronika Fitz as herself
- Robert Graf as himself
- Margarete Haagen as herself
- Harry Hertzsch as himself
- Eva Maria Meineke as herself
- Hannes Messemer as himself
- Ina Peters as herself
- Rosl Schäfer as herself
- Johanna von Koczian as herself
- Annemarie Wernicke as herself

== Bibliography ==
- Tim Bergfelder, Erica Carter & Deniz Göktürk. The German Cinema Book. BFI, 2002.
- Bock, Hans-Michael & Bergfelder, Tim. The Concise CineGraph. Encyclopedia of German Cinema. Berghahn Books, 2009.
