= Agatha, Stop That Murdering! =

1960 film

- German film poster
- German: Agatha, laß das Morden sein!
- Directed by: Dietrich Haugk
- Written by: Eva Anger; Franz Geiger; Karl Peter Gillmann; Stefan Gommermann; Dietrich Haugk; Franz Marischka; Franz M. Schilder; Wolfgang Schnitzler; Hans Schweikart; Gottfried Wegeleben; Hugo Wiener
- Produced by: Hans Abich; Heinz Angermeyer; Rolf Thiele; Gottfried Wegeleben
- Starring: Johanna von Koczian; Klausjürgen Wussow; Elisabeth Flickenschildt
- Cinematography: Günther Senftleben
- Edited by: Anneliese Schönnenbeck
- Music by: Hans-Martin Majewski
- Production company: Filmaufbau
- Distributed by: Constantin Film
- Release date: 22 December 1960
- Running time: 98 minutes
- Country: West Germany
- Language: German

Agatha, Stop That Murdering! (German: Agatha, laß das Morden sein!) is a 1960 West German comedy crime film directed by Dietrich Haugk and starring Johanna von Koczian, Klausjürgen Wussow and Elisabeth Flickenschildt. It is a parody both of the ongoing film series of Edgar Wallace adaptations and the traditions of the mystery novels of Agatha Christie.It was shot at the Bavaria Studios in Munich. The film's sets were designed by the art directors Franz Bi and Bruno Monden.

== Plot ==
A famous female crime novelist goes to stay in a country house, where a killer is on the loose.

== Cast ==
- Johanna von Koczian as Agatha Scott
- Klausjürgen Wussow as Dr. Peter Brent
- Elisabeth Flickenschildt as Sylvia Brent, his aunt
- Peter Vogel as Edgar Karter
- Hans Dieter Zeidler as David
- Wolfgang Kieling as Philip
- Karl Lieffen as Thomas Lorenzen
- Beppo Brem as Landgendarm
- Egon Vogel as institutional physician
- Paul Bös as coffin seller
- Gudrun Thielemann as secretary
