= Hans Abich =

German film producer (1918–2003)

- Born: 4 August 1918; Oberlausitz, German Empire
- Died: 17 July 2003 (aged 84); Freiburg, Germany
- Occupation: Producer
- Years active: 1948–1964 (film)

Hans Abich (4 August 1918 – 17 July 2003) was a German film producer.

== Selected filmography ==
- Love '47 (1949)
- Keepers of the Night (1949)
- A Day Will Come (1950)
- The Day Before the Wedding (1952)
- His Royal Highness (1953)
- Beloved Life (1953)
- She (1954)
- Mamitschka (1955)
- Night of Decision (1956)
- Friederike von Barring (1956)
- Without You All Is Darkness (1956)
- Confessions of Felix Krull (1957)
- Rose Bernd (1957)
- The Glass Tower (1957)
- Wir Wunderkinder (1958)
- Restless Night (1958)
- A Woman Who Knows What She Wants (1958)
- The Man Who Sold Himself (1959)
- People in the Net (1959)
- The Buddenbrooks (1959)
- Two Times Adam, One Time Eve (1959)
- Storm in a Water Glass (1960)
- Beloved Augustin (1960)
- The Ambassador (1960)
- Stage Fright (1960)
- Agatha, Stop That Murdering! (1960)
- Tonio Kröger (1964)

== Bibliography ==
- Eric Rentschler. West German filmmakers on film: visions and voices. Holmes & Meier, 1988.
