= Ruth Leuwerik =

German actress

- Born: 23 April 1924; Essen, Germany
- Died: 12 January 2016 (aged 91); Munich, Germany
- Occupation: Actress

Ruth Leuwerik (German: [ʁuːt ˈlɔɪ̯.və.ʁɪk]; 23 April 1924 – 12 January 2016) was a German film actress, one of the most popular stars of German film during the 1950s. She appeared in 34 films between 1950 and 1977. Leuwerik is probably best known for her portrayal of Maria von Trapp in the films The Trapp Family and The Trapp Family in America.

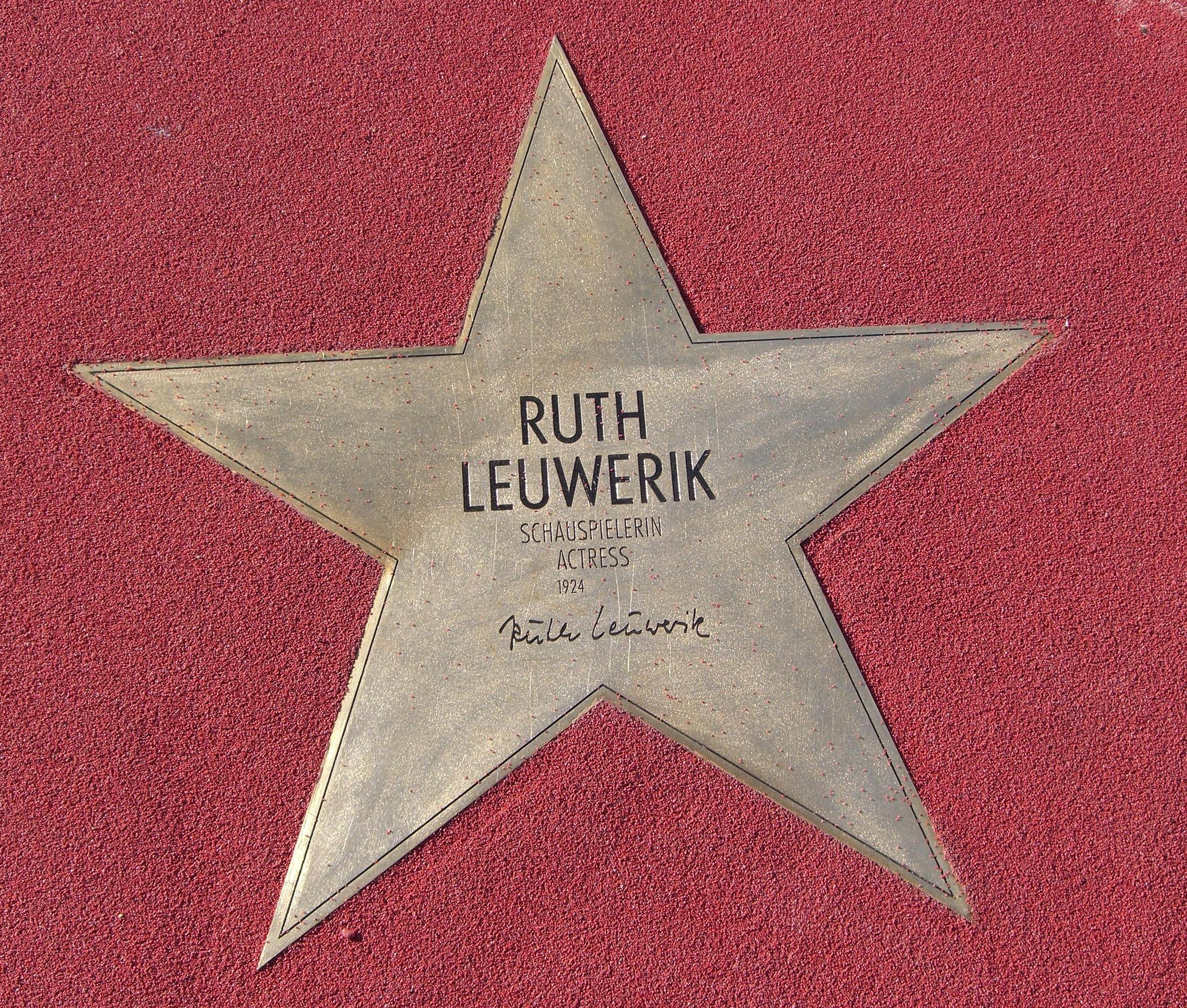
On the Boulevard of the Stars, Berlin

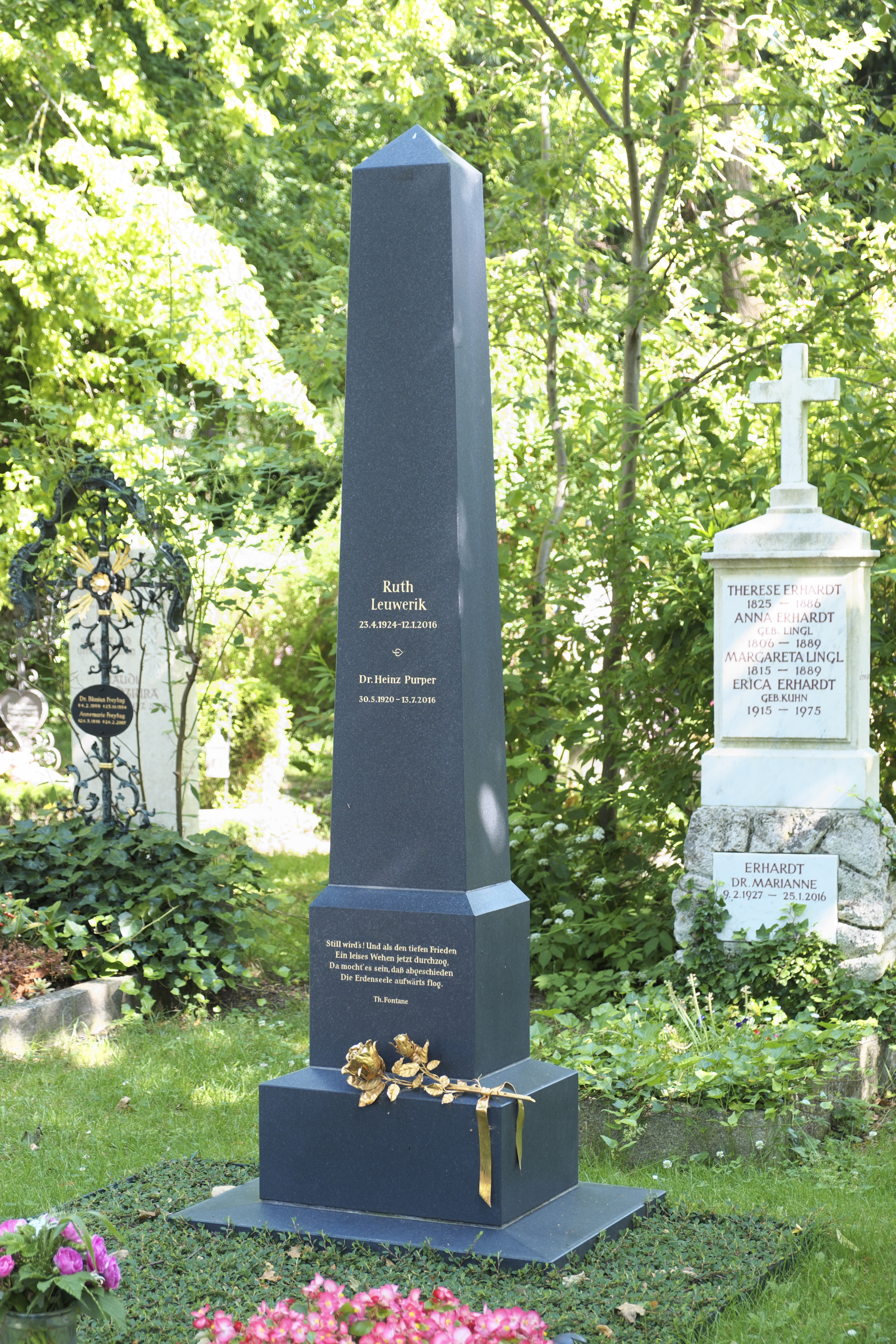
Grave in Nymphenburg

Born in Essen as Ruth Leeuwerik, she grew up there and in Münster. She began her acting career with stage roles in the late 1940s. In the 1950s, she and Dieter Borsche were considered as the ideal couple of the German film. In 1962 she starred in the Helmut Käutner film Redhead, which was entered in the 12th Berlin International Film Festival. She is a five-time Bambi Award winner. Leuwerik died in Munich on 12 January 2016.

== Partial filmography ==
- Thirteen Under One Hat (1950) – Evelyne Winterthur (her film debut)
- Father Needs a Wife (1952) – Susanne Meissner
- The Great Temptation (1952) – Hilde
- A Heart Plays False (1953) – Sybilla Zander
- Must We Get Divorced? (1953) – Garda von Doerr
- Beloved Life (1953) – Louise von Bolin
- His Royal Highness (1953, after Thomas Mann's novel) – Imma Spoelman
- Portrait of an Unknown Woman (1954) – Nicole
- Ludwig II (1955) – Kaiserin Elisabeth von Österreich
- Beloved Enemy (1955) – Violante Gore
- Roses in Autumn (1955, after Theodor Fontane's novel Effi Briest) – Effi Briest
- The Golden Bridge (1956) – Tima
- The Trapp Family (1956) – Baronin Maria von Trapp
- Queen Louise (1957) – Königin Luise
- Goodbye, Franziska (1957) – Franziska
- Immer wenn der Tag beginnt (1957) – Dr. Hanna Burkhardt
- Taiga (1958) – Hanna Dietrich
- The Trapp Family in America (1958) – Baronin Maria von Trapp
- Dorothea Angermann (1959) – Dorothea Angermann
- The Ideal Woman (1959) – Fanny Becker
- Sweetheart of the Gods (1960) – Renate Mueller
- A Woman for Life (1960) – Margarete Barnebusch
- You Don't Shoot at Angels (1960) – Maria
- Die Stunde, die du glücklich bist (1961) – Vera
- Der Traum von Lieschen Müller (1961) – Autograph hunter
- Redhead (1962) – Franziska Lukas
- Eleven Years and One Day (1963) – Tina Rodenbach
- The House in Montevideo (1963) – Marianne Nägler
- An Alibi for Death (1963) – Dr. Maria Rohn
- Und Jimmy ging zum Regenbogen (1971) – Valerie Steinfeld
- Disorder and Early Torment (1977) – Frau Gerda Cornelius
- Derrick (1978, Episode: "Ein Hinterhalt") – Dr. Marta Schwenn
- The Buddenbrooks (1979, TV miniseries, after Thomas Mann's novel) – Konsulin
- Derrick (1983, Episode: "Der Täter schickte Blumen") – Vera Baruda
