= Harry Meyen =

German actor (1924–1979)

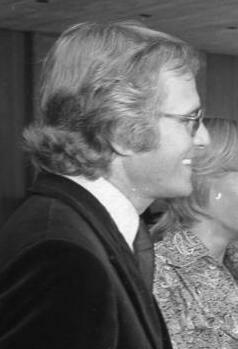
- Meyen in 1971
- Born: Harald Haubenstock; 31 August 1924; Hamburg, Germany
- Died: 15 April 1979 (aged 54); Hamburg, West Germany
- Resting place: Ohlsdorf Cemetery, Hamburg
- Occupation: Actor
- Years active: 1948–1975
- Spouses: Anneliese Römer (m. 1953; div. 1966) Romy Schneider (m. 1966; div. 1975)
- Children: 1

Harry Meyen (born Harald Haubenstock; 31 August 1924 – 15 April 1979) was a German film actor. He appeared in more than 40 films and television productions between 1948 and 1975. In the 1960s he also worked as a theatre director in West Germany.

== Personal life ==
Meyen was born in Hamburg, the son of a Jewish merchant who was deported to a concentration camp during the Nazi regime. The 18-year-old Meyen himself was incarcerated at the Fuhlsbüttel concentration camp from July to December 1942.

After the war, he began his career with Willy Maertens at the Hamburg Thalia Theater. From 1952 he performed at the Theater Aachen and from 1955 moved to Berlin. Also starring in films directed by Helmut Käutner, Falk Harnack and Wolfgang Staudte, he played the role of a young Luftwaffe officer in the 1955 movie Des Teufels General side by side with Curd Jürgens. He also worked as a dubbing actor giving his voice to Dirk Bogarde, Robert Mitchum, Michel Piccoli, Peter Sellers, and Jean-Louis Trintignant.

From 1953 to 1966 he was married to actress Anneliese Römer. In July 1966 he married Romy Schneider in Saint-Jean-Cap-Ferrat. Their son David Christopher was born 3 December 1966; the family lived in Berlin and later in Hamburg. Meyen dealt with the production of theatre plays and operas, however with moderate success. The couple finally divorced in 1975 and Schneider took their son with her to France.

Meyen was a heavy drinker and used different types of drugs, suffering from depression caused by the torture he had received from the Nazis for being half-Jewish. In 1979, Meyen hanged himself at home in Hamburg. He is buried in the Ohlsdorf Cemetery. His son David Meyen died in a tragic accident two years later.

== Selected filmography ==
- Nora's Ark (1948) – Peter Stoll
- K – Das Haus des Schweigens (1951) – Roger
- The Sergeant's Daughter (1952) – Leutnant Robert Kroldt
- Alraune (1952) – Count Geroldingen
- We're Dancing on the Rainbow (1952) – Grigory
- Beloved Life (1953) – Jürgen von Bolin
- Regina Amstetten (1954) – Jürgen von Bredow
- The Faithful Hussar (1954) – Fred Wacker
- The Telephone Operator (1954) – Curt Cramer
- Des Teufels General (1955) – Leutnant Hartmann
- Miracle Mile (1956) – Philip Ardent
- My Sixteen Sons (1956)
- Night of Decision (1956)
- Junger Mann, der alles kann (1957) – Hubert Rombach, Kunsthändler
- Scandal in Bad Ischl (1957) – Dr. Balsam, Assistenzarzt
- Escape from Sahara (1958) – Jean de Maire
- Petersburger Nächte (1958)
- Iron Gustav (1958) – Assessor
- Freddy, the Guitar and the Sea (1959) – Lothar Brückner
- Old Heidelberg (1959) – Graf Detlev v. Asterberg
- The High Life (1960) – Heinrich
- Sweetheart of the Gods (1960) – Volker Hellberg
- Storm in a Water Glass (1960) – George
- A Woman for Life (1960) – Leutnant Karl Degenhardt
- Ordered to Love (1961) – Hauptsturmführer Dr. Hagen
- Murder Party (1961) – Klaus Troger
- Doctor Sibelius (1962) – Dr. Möllendorf
- Redhead (1962) – Herbert Lucas
- Enough Rope (1963) – Tony
- The Curse of the Hidden Vault (1964) – Inspector Angel
- Is Paris Burning? (1966) – Lieutenant von Arnim
- Triple Cross (1966) – Lieutenant Keller
- Photo Finish (directed by Harry Meyen, 1970, TV film) – Sam Kinsale
- Derrick: "Kamillas junger Freund" (1975, TV) – Dr. Hauffe
- Derrick: "Mord im TEE 91" (1977, TV) – Harris
