= Wilhelm Utermann =

German writer and film producer (1912–1991)

- Born: 3 December 1912; Annen, German Empire
- Died: 11 August 1991 (aged 78); Roggersdorf, Gemeinde Holzkirchen, Germany

Wilhelm "Utz" Utermann (3 December 1912 – 11 August 1991) was a German writer, journalist, screenwriter and film producer.

He used the following pseudonyms: William Utermann, William Roggersdorf and Mathias Racker. Utermann was a former editor of the Nazi Party's newspaper Völkischer Beobachter and had been a Nazi bestselling author.

As Wilhelm Roggersdorf, he edited Erich von Däniken's Chariots of the Gods? and extensively rewrote the book.

He was married to Clementine zu Castell-Rüdenhausen.

== Selected filmography ==
- Small Town Poet (1940)
- Portrait of an Unknown Woman (1954)
- Roses in Autumn (1955)
- The Golden Bridge (1956)
- Taiga (1958)
- The Ideal Woman (1959)
- You Don't Shoot at Angels (1960)
- Murder Party (1961)
- Max the Pickpocket (1962)
- Life Begins at Eight (1962)
- He Can't Stop Doing It (1962)
- My Daughter and I (1963)
- A Mission for Mr. Dodd (1964)
