= Walter Haag =

German art director (1898–1978)

- Born: 14 February 1898; Berlin, German Empire
- Died: 20 April 1978 (aged 80); Göttingen, West Germany
- Occupation: Art Director
- Years active: 1932 – 1968 (film)

Walter Haag (1898–1978) was a German art director. He worked on more than sixty films during his career including the 1940 historical melodrama The Heart of a Queen.

== Selected filmography ==
- Honour Among Thieves (1933)
- The Private Life of Louis XIV (1935)
- The Abduction of the Sabine Women (1936)
- When the Cock Crows (1936)
- The Heart of a Queen (1940)
- The Gasman (1941)
- The Way to Freedom (1941)
- Wedding in Barenhof (1942)
- The Great Love (1942)
- Between Heaven and Earth (1942)
- Back Then (1943)
- Keepers of the Night (1949)
- Amico (1949)
- My Niece Susanne (1950)
- A Day Will Come (1950)
- Doctor Praetorius (1950)
- Immortal Beloved (1951)
- The Day Before the Wedding (1952)
- Beloved Life (1953)
- The Blue Hour (1953)
- His Royal Highness (1953)
- She (1954)
- Mamitschka (1955)
- Roses in Autumn (1955)
- Night of Decision (1956)
- The Glass Tower (1957)
- King in Shadow (1957)
- A Woman Who Knows What She Wants (1958)
- Father, Mother and Nine Children (1958)
- Nick Knatterton’s Adventure (1959)
- Triplets on Board (1959)
- Of Course, the Motorists (1959)
- The Last Pedestrian (1960)
- The Swedish Girl (1965)

== Bibliography ==
- Hull, David Stewart. Film in the Third Reich: A Study of the German Cinema, 1933-1945. University of California Press, 1969.
