= Rolf Thiele =

German film director (1918–1994)

- Born: 7 March 1918; Prödlitz, Bohemia, Austria-Hungary (now Předlice, Czech Republic)
- Died: 9 October 1994 (aged 76); Munich, Germany
- Occupations: Film director Producer; Screenwriter
- Years active: 1948–1978

Rolf Thiele (7 March 1918 – 9 October 1994) was a German film director, producer and screenwriter. He directed 42 films between 1951 and 1977. He was born in Prödlitz, then in the Austro-Hungarian Empire. His 1958 film Eva was entered into the 1959 Cannes Film Festival. His 1964 film Tonio Kröger was entered into the 14th Berlin International Film Festival.

== Selected filmography ==
- Keepers of the Night (1949, dir. Harald Braun)
- A Day Will Come (1950, dir. Rudolf Jugert)
- Primanerinnen (1951)
- The Day Before the Wedding (1952)
- Beloved Life (1953)
- His Royal Highness (1953, dir. Harald Braun)
- She (1954)
- The Barrings (1955)
- Mamitschka (1955)
- Night of Decision (1956, dir. Falk Harnack)
- Friederike von Barring (1956)
- Without You All Is Darkness (1956)
- Scandal in Bad Ischl (1957)
- Confessions of Felix Krull (1957, dir. Kurt Hoffmann)
- The Mad Bomberg (1957)
- El Hakim (1957)
- Eva (1958)
- Rosemary (1958)
- The Man Who Sold Himself (1959, dir. Josef von Báky)
- Labyrinth (1959)
- Beloved Augustin (1960)
- You Don't Shoot at Angels (1960)
- Agatha, Stop That Murdering! (1960)
- Storm in a Water Glass (1960)
- Lulu (1962)
- Black-White-Red Four Poster (1962)
- Venusberg (1963)
- Moral 63 (1963)
- Tonio Kröger (1964)
- DM-Killer (1965)
- The Blood of the Walsungs (1965)
- The Gentlemen (1965)
- Who Wants to Sleep? (1965)
- Once a Greek (1966)
- The Death of a Double (1967)
- The Liar and the Nun (1967)
- The Duck Rings at Half Past Seven (1968)
- The New Adventures of Snow White (1969)
- Come to Vienna, I'll Show You Something! (1970)
- Slap in the Face (1970)
- Grimm's Fairy Tales for Adults (1970)
- Der scharfe Heinrich (1971)
- The Love Keys (1971)
- Temptation in the Summer Wind (1972)
- Women in Hospital (1977)
