= Göttingen Studios =

Former film studios in Göttingen, Germany

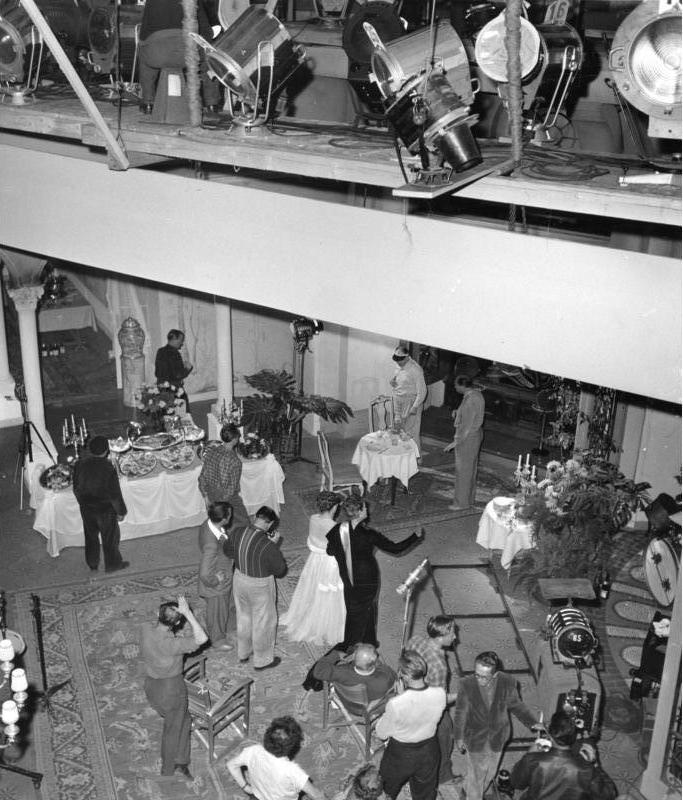
Shooting at the film studios in 1953.

The Göttingen Studios were film studios located in the German city of Göttingen. The studios were established in 1948 on a site that had previously been used as an aeroplane hangar on the outskirts of Göttingen. The studios were founded by the independent producers Hans Abich and Rolf Thiele. Control of the studios soon expanded, and most of the films produced there were distributed by Deutsch Film Hansa. The city benefited by being comparatively lightly hit by Allied bombing during the Second World War. It was part of shift of film production out of Berlin, previously the dominant centre of German production, following the war and subsequent Cold War Partition of Germany. It was the fourth largest centre of production in West Germany behind Munich, Hamburg and West Berlin, with nearly a hundred feature films produced there in a decade.

In 1961 when film production ceased at the site, it passed to the postal service Deutsche Bundespost. Later control transferred to the pharmaceutical company Sartorius AG.

== Bibliography ==
- Imhoof, David. Becoming a Nazi Town: Culture and Politics in Göttingen Between the World Wars. University of Michigan Press, 2013.
- Meier, Gustav. Filmstadt Göttingen: Bilder für eine neue Welt? : zur Geschichte der Göttinger Spielfilmproduktion 1945 bis 1961. Reichold, 1996.
- Noack, Frank. Veit Harlan: The Life and Work of a Nazi Filmmaker. University Press of Kentucky, 2016.
