= List of West German films of 1959 =

List of films produced in Germany in 1959

List of West German films of 1959. Feature films produced and distributed in West Germany in 1959.

== A–Z ==
Title	Director	Cast	Genre	Notes
Abschied von den Wolken	Gottfried Reinhardt	O. W. Fischer, Peter van Eyck, Sonja Ziemann, Horst Frank, Linda Christian	Drama, Adventure	a.k.a. Rebel Flight to Cuba
Adorable Arabella	Axel von Ambesser	Johanna von Koczian, Carlos Thompson, Hilde Hildebrand	Comedy	
And That on Monday Morning	Luigi Comencini	O. W. Fischer, Ulla Jacobsson, Vera Tschechowa	Comedy	Entered into the 9th Berlin International Film Festival
The Angel Who Pawned Her Harp	Kurt Hoffmann	Ullrich Haupt, Matthias Fuchs, Tatjana Sais	Comedy	
As the Sea Rages	Horst Hächler	Maria Schell, Cliff Robertson, Cameron Mitchell	Drama	Co-production with the US and Yugoslavia
At Blonde Kathrein's Place	Hans Quest	Marianne Hold, Gerhard Riedmann, Harald Juhnke	Comedy	
The Beautiful Adventure	Kurt Hoffmann	Liselotte Pulver, Bruni Löbel, Robert Graf	Comedy	
Besuch aus heiterem Himmel	Ferdinand Dörfler	Johannes Heesters	Comedy	
The Big Knife	Franz Josef Wild	Paul Hubschmid, Maria Holst, Maria Sebaldt, Ann Smyrner	Drama	
The Black Chapel	Ralph Habib	Peter van Eyck, Dawn Addams, Gino Cervi, Werner Peters	War drama	Co-production with France and Italy
The Blue Moth	Wolfgang Schleif	Zarah Leander, Christian Wolff, Paul Hartmann	Drama	
Die Brücke	Bernhard Wicki	Folker Bohnet, Fritz Wepper, Michael Hinz, Volker Lechtenbrink, Cordula Trantow	Anti-war film	a.k.a. The Bridge
The Buddenbrooks	Alfred Weidenmann	Hansjörg Felmy, Liselotte Pulver, Nadja Tiller, Hanns Lothar, Lil Dagover, Werner Hinz	Drama	
The Caine Mutiny Court-Martial	Hanns Farenburg	Rudolf Fernau, Heinz Reincke, Werner Bruhns, Günther Schramm	Drama, War	a.k.a. Die Caine war ihr Schicksal
Clavigo	Werner Völger	Helmuth Lohner, Ulla Jacobsson	Drama	
Court Martial	Kurt Meisel	Karlheinz Böhm, Hans Nielsen	War drama	Entered into the 1959 Cannes Film Festival
Crime After School	Alfred Vohrer	Peter van Eyck, Christian Wolff, Heidi Brühl	Drama	a.k.a. The Young Go Wild
The Day the Rains Came	Gerd Oswald	Mario Adorf, Gert Fröbe, Elke Sommer, Christian Wolff	Crime drama	
The Death Ship	Georg Tressler	Horst Buchholz, Elke Sommer, Mario Adorf	Drama, Adventure	
Dial M for Murder	Rainer Wolffhardt	Eva Maria Meineke, Heinz Drache, Charles Régnier, Siegfried Lowitz, Herbert Tiede	Thriller	
A Doctor of Conviction	Werner Klingler	Adrian Hoven, Willy Birgel, Antje Geerk	Drama	
Doctor Without Scruples	Falk Harnack	Ewald Balser, Barbara Rütting, Wolfgang Preiss	Horror	
The Domestic Tyrant	Hans Deppe	Heinz Erhardt, Grethe Weiser, Peter Vogel	Comedy	
Dorothea Angermann	Robert Siodmak	Ruth Leuwerik, Bert Sotlar, Alfred Schieske]	Drama	
Everybody Loves Peter	Wolfgang Becker	Peter Kraus, Hannelore Schroth, Christine Kaufmann	Musical comedy	
Every Day Isn't Sunday	Helmut Weiss	Paul Hubschmid, Elisabeth Müller	Comedy	
For the First Time	Rudolph Maté	Mario Lanza, Johanna von Koczian, Zsa Zsa Gabor	Musical	Co-production with the US
Der Frosch mit der Maske	Harald Reinl	Joachim Fuchsberger, Siegfried Lowitz, Fritz Rasp, Eddi Arent	Mystery thriller	a.k.a. Face of the Frog a.k.a. The Fellowship of the Frog. Based on Edgar Wallace
Girls for the Mambo-Bar	Wolfgang Gluck	Kai Fischer, Gerlinde Locker, Jimmy Makulis	Crime	
The Goose of Sedan	Helmut Käutner	Hardy Krüger, Jean Richard, Dany Carrel, Theo Lingen	War comedy	Co-production with France
The Head	Victor Trivas	Horst Frank, Michel Simon	Horror	
Here I Am, Here I Stay	Werner Jacobs	Caterina Valente, Hans Holt	Musical	
Hunting Party	Hermann Kugelstadt	Wolf Albach-Retty, Willy Fritsch	Drama	
The Ideal Woman	Josef von Báky	Ruth Leuwerik, Martin Benrath, Boy Gobert	Comedy	
The Indian Tomb	Fritz Lang	Debra Paget, Paul Hubschmid	Adventure	Co-production with France and Italy
Jacqueline	Wolfgang Liebeneiner	Johanna von Koczian, Walther Reyer, Götz George	Comedy	
Jons und Erdme	Victor Vicas	Giulietta Masina, Richard Basehart, Carl Raddatz, Karin Baal, Gert Fröbe	Drama	Co-production with Italy
Konto ausgeglichen	Franz Peter Wirth	Wolfgang Preiss, Margot Trooger, Herbert Tiede	Crime	a.k.a. The Embezzler a.k.a. Money and the Woman
Labyrinth	Rolf Thiele	Nadja Tiller, Peter van Eyck, Amedeo Nazzari	Drama	Co-production with Italy
La Paloma	Paul Martin	Bibi Johns, Karlheinz Böhm	Musical	
The Lower Depths	Paul Verhoeven	Mario Adorf, Pinkas Braun, Margot Trooger	Drama	a.k.a. Nachtasyl
The Man Who Sold Himself	Josef von Báky	Hildegard Knef, Hansjörg Felmy	Crime	
The Man Who Walked Through the Wall	Ladislao Vajda	Heinz Rühmann, Nicole Courcel	Fantasy, Comedy	
Mandolins and Moonlight	Hans Deppe	Claus Biederstaedt, Johanna König	Musical	
Marili	Josef von Báky	Sabine Sinjen, Paul Hubschmid, Helmuth Lohner	Comedy	
Menschen im Hotel	Gottfried Reinhardt	Michèle Morgan, O. W. Fischer, Heinz Rühmann, Gert Fröbe, Sonja Ziemann	Drama	Co-production with France
The Merry War of Captain Pedro	Wolfgang Becker	Carlos Thompson, Corny Collins, Boy Gobert	Historical comedy	
Moonwolf	Georges Friedland, Martin Nosseck	Carl Möhner, Anneli Sauli, Helmut Schmid	Sci-Fi	Co-production with Finland
Nick Knatterton's Adventure	Hans Quest	Karl Lieffen, Gert Fröbe, Günter Pfitzmann	Comedy	
Nocturno im Grand Hotel	Fritz Schröder-Jahn	Johannes Heesters, Mady Rahl, Gisela Schlüter	Crime comedy	
Of Course, the Motorists	Erich Engels	Heinz Erhardt, Maria Perschy, Erik Schumann	Comedy	
Old Heidelberg	Ernst Marischka	Christian Wolff, Gert Fröbe, Sabine Sinjen	Romance	
Paprika	Kurt Wilhelm	Violetta Ferrari, Waltraut Haas	Comedy	
Paradise for Sailors	Harald Reinl	Margit Saad, Boy Gobert, Mara Lane	Comedy	
The Patriot	Rudolph Cartier	Albert Lieven, Jochen Brockmann, Ellen Schwiers	Drama	
People in the Net	Franz Peter Wirth	Hansjörg Felmy, Johanna von Koczian	Cold War spy drama	a.k.a. Unwilling Agent
Peter Shoots Down the Bird	Géza von Cziffra	Peter Alexander, Germaine Damar, Maria Sebaldt	Comedy	
Peter Voss, Hero of the Day	Georg Marischka	O. W. Fischer, Linda Christian, Walter Giller	Adventure, Comedy	
Raskolnikov	Franz Peter Wirth	Hartmut Reck, Paul Verhoeven, Solveig Thomas	Crime drama	a.k.a. Crime and Punishment
The Rats	John Olden	Ingrid Andree, Gisela von Collande, Walter Richter, Elisabeth Flickenschildt	Drama	
The Rest Is Silence	Helmut Käutner	Hardy Krüger, Peter van Eyck	Drama	Entered into the 9th Berlin International Film Festival
Rommel Calls Cairo	Wolfgang Schleif	Adrian Hoven, Elisabeth Müller, Peter van Eyck	War	
Roses for the Prosecutor	Wolfgang Staudte	Martin Held, Walter Giller	Comedy	
Ruf ohne Echo	Rainer Wolffhardt	Horst Tappert, Hans Christian Blech, Gisela Trowe, Herbert Fleischmann, Walter Buschhoff	Drama	a.k.a. Saints in Hell
The Scarlet Baroness	Rudolf Jugert	Dawn Addams, Joachim Fuchsberger, Wera Frydtberg	War, Spy thriller	
Die sechste Frau	Ulrich Erfurth	Hannelore Schroth, Hermann Schomberg, Ullrich Haupt, Maximilian Schell, Brigitte Grothum, Inge Meysel	Comedy	
Serengeti Shall Not Die	Bernhard Grzimek		Documentary	
The Shepherd from Trutzberg	Eduard von Borsody	Heidi Brühl, Hans von Borsody	Historical romance	
Stalingrad: Dogs, Do You Want to Live Forever?	Frank Wisbar	Joachim Hansen, Wilhelm Borchert, Wolfgang Preiss, Günter Pfitzmann, Sonja Ziemann	War	
A Summer You Will Never Forget	Werner Jacobs	Claus Biederstaedt, Karin Dor	Drama	
That's No Way to Land a Man	Hans Deppe	Grethe Weiser, Karin Dor	Comedy	
The Tiger of Eschnapur	Fritz Lang	Debra Paget, Paul Hubschmid	Adventure	Co-production with France and Italy
The Treasure of San Teresa	Alvin Rakoff	Eddie Constantine, Dawn Addams, Marius Goring, Christopher Lee	Thriller	Co-production with the UK
Triplets on Board	Hans Müller	Heinz Erhardt, Ann Smyrner	Comedy	
Twelve Hours By the Clock	Géza von Radványi	Lino Ventura, Eva Bartok, Gert Fröbe	Crime drama	Co-production with France
Two Times Adam, One Time Eve	Franz M. Lang	Heidi Brühl, Matthias Fuchs, Brigitte Grothum	Comedy	
The Visit	Ludwig Cremer	Elisabeth Flickenschildt	Drama	a.k.a. Der Besuch der alten Dame
What a Woman Dreams of in Springtime	Erik Ode, Arthur Maria Rabenalt	Rudolf Prack, Winnie Markus, Ivan Desny	Comedy	

== Bibliography ==
- Davidson, John & Hake, Sabine. Framing the Fifties: Cinema in a Divided Germany. Berghahn Books, 2007.
- Fehrenbach, Heide. Cinema in Democratizing Germany: Reconstructing National Identity After Hitler. University of North Carolina Press, 1995.

== See also ==
- List of Austrian films of 1959
- List of East German films of 1959
