= The Berliner (film) =

1948 film directed by Robert A. Stemmle

- Berliner Ballade
- Directed by: Robert A. Stemmle
- Written by: Günter Neumann
- Produced by: Alf Teichs
- Starring: Gert Fröbe; Tatjana Sais; Ute Sielisch; Aribert Wäscher; Hans Deppe; O. E. Hasse; Werner Oehlschlaeger
- Narrated by: Erik Ode
- Cinematography: Georg Krause
- Edited by: Walter Wischniewsky
- Music by: Werner Eisbrenner; Günter Neumann
- Production company: Comedia-Film
- Distributed by: Dietz-Filmverleih
- Release date: 31 December 1948
- Running time: 89 minutes
- Country: West Berlin
- Languages: German; English

The Berliner (German: Berliner Ballade; also known as The Ballad of Berlin) is a 1948 German comedy film adapted by Günter Neumann from his cabaret, directed by Robert A. Stemmle, and starring Gert Fröbe in his first leading role. It offers a satirical portrayal of life in Berlin in the aftermath of World War II.

== Plot ==
The film has a framing narrative set in 2048 where viewers are offered the chance to look back at "The Ancients", which introduces the main narrative set in 1948. The film reflects the struggles of Otto Normalverbraucher (Otto Average-Consumer, played by Fröbe), a former German soldier returning to civilian life in Occupied Berlin after World War II. After many travails, struggling to find food, shelter, and work, he eventually falls in love and ends up happily with his dream woman.

== Production ==
The film was adapted by Günter Neumann from his cabaret program Schwarzer Jahrmarkt, was filmed in West Berlin at the time of the Soviet blockade, and shot on location and at the Tempelhof Studios. The film was narrated by Erik Ode. Joseph Burstyn Inc. distributed the film in the U.S.

== Cast ==
- Gert Fröbe as Otto Normalverbraucher
- Tatjana Sais as Frau Ida Holle
- Ute Sielisch as Eva Wandel, Bäuerin
- Aribert Wäscher as Anton Zeithammer
- O.E. Hasse as Der Reaktionär
- Hans Deppe as Emil Lemke
- Werner Oehlschlaeger as Raisonneur
- Karl Schönböck as Rundfunkreporter
- Herbert Hübner as Herr Bollmann, politischer Redner
- Alfred Schieske as Herr Schneidewind, Politischer Redner
- Herbert Weissbach as Spirituosenhändler
- Kurt Weitkamp as Einbrecher
- Franz-Otto Krüger as Einbrecher Franz

== Critical reception ==
Newspaper clipping of a French review from L'Aurore.

The Darmstädter Echo praised it for its lack of spite and viciousness and its humor and humanity. Angelica Fenner compares the film to Bertolt Brecht with devices such as the omniscient narrator, prototypical characters, and satirical tone. Sabine Hake points out that although within the genre of post-war Trümmerfilme (rubble film) it offers a refreshing change from the majority of those films through its use of satirical humor. In contrast, Stephen Brockmann criticised the film for portraying an optimistic message about the survival of the human spirit after World War II while ignoring the causes of the war.

The name Otto Normalverbraucher had become a German equivalent of "Average Joe".

== Awards ==
It was nominated for a BAFTA for Best Film from any Source in the 1950 ceremony, when it was beaten by Bicycle Thieves. It won an International Prize at the 10th Venice International Film Festival in 1949.
