= Günter Neumann (singer) =

German singer (1913–1972)

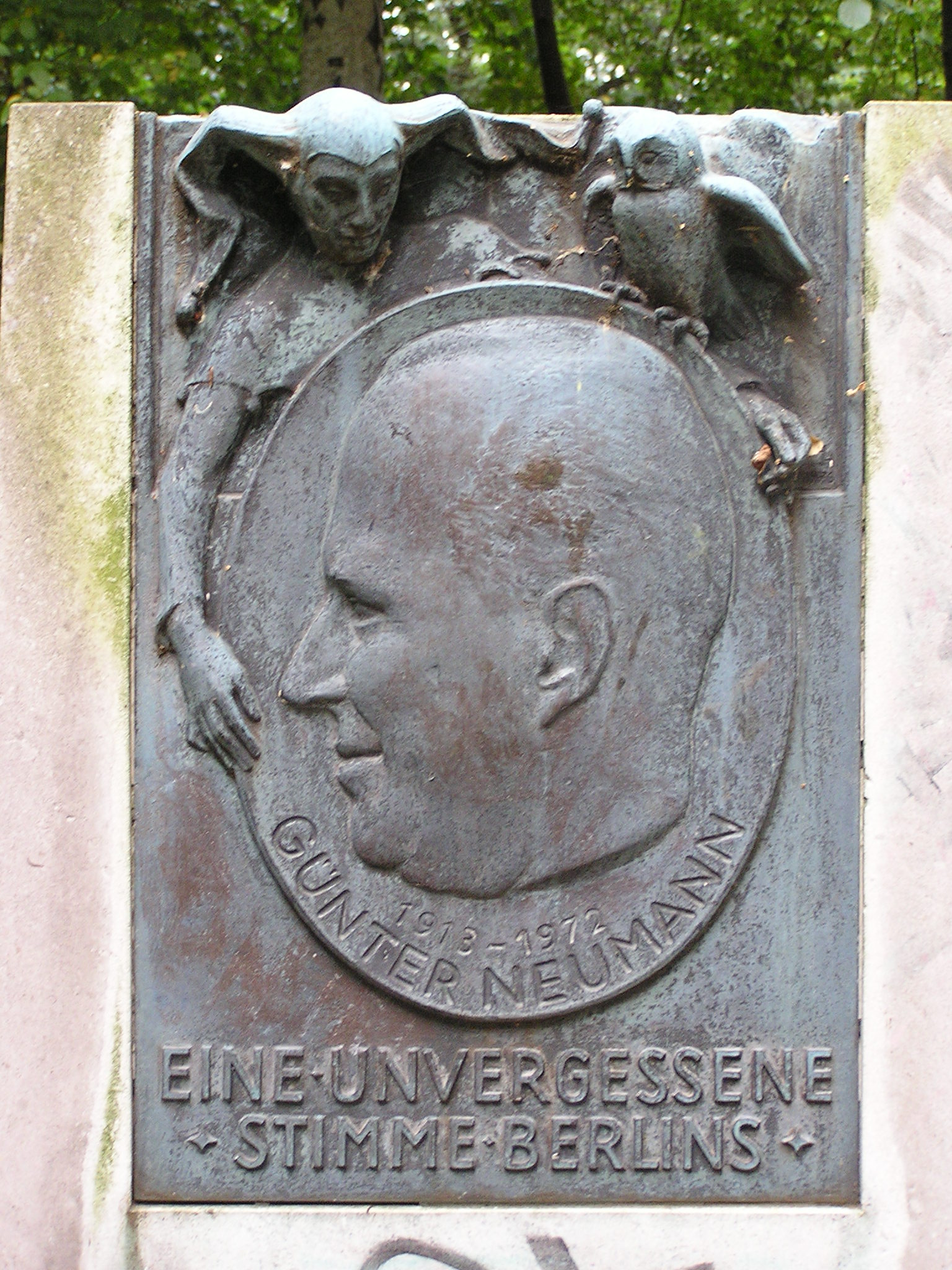
- Born: 19 May 1913; Berlin, German Empire
- Died: 17 October 1972 (aged 59); Munich, West Germany
- Years active: 1931–1972 (film)
- Spouse: Tatjana Sais (?–?)

Günter Christian Ludwig Neumann (19 May 1913 – 17 October 1972) was a German singer, composer lyricist, cabaretist and screenwriter. He contributed to many popular songs and worked frequently in the German film industry on productions such as The Berliner (1948).

== Selected filmography ==
- M (uncredited) (1931)
- Bachelor's Paradise (1939)
- Heaven, We Inherit a Castle (1943)
- The Berliner (1948)
- Fireworks (1954)
- The Spessart Inn (1958)
- Aren't We Wonderful? (1958)
- The Beautiful Adventure (1959)
- The Haunted Castle (1960)
- Snow White and the Seven Jugglers (1962)
- Glorious Times at the Spessart Inn (1967)

== Bibliography ==
- Shandley, Robert. Rubble Films: German Cinema in the Shadow of the Third Reich. Temple University Press, 2010.
