= Liselotte Pulver =

Swiss actress (born 1929)

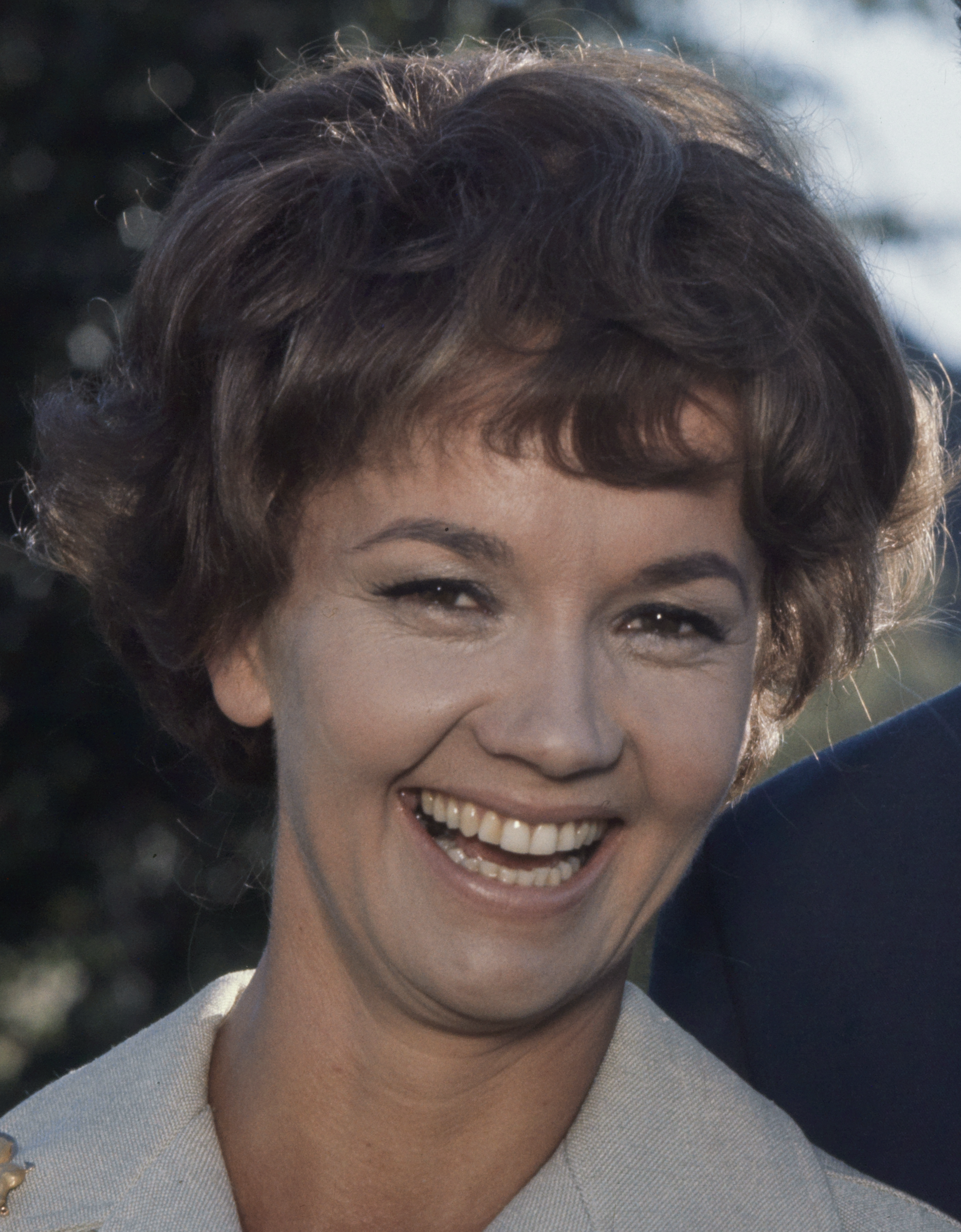
- Pulver in 1968
- Born: Liselotte Pulver; 11 October 1929 (age 96); Bern, Switzerland
- Occupation: Actress
- Years active: 1949–2007
- Spouse: Helmut Schmid (m. 1961–1992)
- Children: 2

Liselotte Pulver (born 11 October 1929), sometimes credited as Lilo Pulver, is a Swiss actress. She was one of the biggest stars of German cinema in the 1950s and 1960s, where she often was cast as a tomboy. She is known for her hearty and joyful laughter. Her films outside of German cinema include A Time to Love and a Time to Die (1958), One, Two, Three (1961) and The Nun (1966).

== Early life ==
Pulver was born on 11 October 1929, in Bern, to civil engineer Fritz Eugen Pulver, and his wife Germaine. From 1945, Pulver attended commercial school. After graduating in 1948, she worked as a model and took acting classes at the Bern conservatory, now part of the Bern University of Applied Sciences. Following small parts at the Bern Theatre (Stadttheater Bern), she appeared at the Schauspielhaus Zürich.

== Film career ==
Pulver's first film role was in the 1949 American-Swiss co-production Swiss Tour. Her breakthrough movie role was "Vreneli", the wife of the lead in Uli, der Knecht (1954), made after the novel of Swiss author Jeremias Gotthelf. Pulver became one of the biggest stars of German-language cinema in the 1950s and 1960s, often nicknamed "Lilo" Pulver. She was very often seen in comedies, most notably I Often Think of Piroschka (1955), The Zürich Engagement (1957), The Spessart Inn (1958) and Kohlhiesel's Daughters (1962). One of her more serious film roles was as Tony Buddenbrook in The Buddenbrooks (1959), a movie adaptation of Thomas Mann's novel of the same name. She also appeared, under the name Lisa Pulver, in another Thomas Mann adaptation, The Confessions of Felix Krull (1957) with Horst Buchholz, under the name Henry Bookholt, in the title role of a charming and narcissistic conman.

In the late 1950s and 1960s, Pulver was involved in a number of American and French film productions. Her first Hollywood film was Douglas Sirk's war melodrama A Time to Love and a Time to Die (1958), in which she and John Gavin played a young German couple whose happiness is doomed at the end of the Second World War. She was James Cagney's attractive secretary "Fräulein Ingeborg" in Billy Wilder's comedy One, Two, Three (1961). In 1963, for her role as a Russian woman in A Global Affair, she was nominated for a Golden Globe Award as best supporting actress. In France, she appeared alongside Anna Karina in Jacques Rivette's film The Nun (1966).

In the 1970s, she increasingly turned towards television roles. From 1978 until 1983 she worked for the German edition of Sesame Street, Sesamstraße. Her last film credit was in 2007, when she played a cameo role in Die Zürcher Verlobung, a remake of The Zürich Engagement. She made a public appearance at the 2018 Bambi Awards, where she accepted a prize for Honorary Achievement.

== Personal life ==
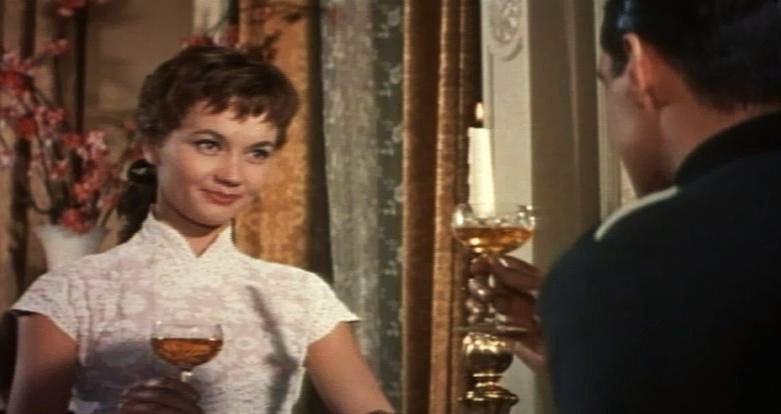
Pulver in the trailer of A Time to Love and a Time to Die (1958)

In 1960, she met German actor Helmut Schmid on the set of Gustav Adolf's Page: they married on 9 September 1961 and had two children. Her daughter committed suicide in 1989. Her husband died in 1992 of a heart attack. As of 2008, Pulver lives secluded in Perroy, Canton Vaud on the shores of Lake Geneva; she also has an apartment at the Burgerspital, a retirement home near Bern.

== Awards ==
- 1963, 1964, 1965, 1967, 1968, 1990, 2018: Bambi Award (in 2018 for livetime achievement)
- 1963: Golden Globe Award nomination as best supporting actress for A Global Affair
- 1986: Order of Merit of the Federal Republic of Germany
- 1999: Bavarian Film Awards Honorary Award
- 2007: Goldene Kamera for Livetime Achievement
- 2011: Star at the Boulevard der Stars in Berlin (Walk of Fame)

== Partial filmography ==
Year	Title	Role	Director	Cast	Notes
1949	Swiss Tour		Leopold Lindtberg	Cornel Wilde, Simone Signoret	
1950	The White Hell of Pitz Palu	Maria	Rolf Hansen	Hans Albers, Adrian Hoven	
1951	A Heidelberg Romance	Susanne Edwards	Paul Verhoeven	O. W. Fischer	
1952	Klettermaxe	Corry Bell	Kurt Hoffmann	Albert Lieven	
1952	Fritz and Friederike	Friederike	Géza von Bolváry	Albert Lieven	
1953	Have Sunshine in Your Heart	Miss Helm	Erich Waschneck	Carl Wery	
1953	We'll Talk About Love Later	Bianca Merz	Karl Anton	Gustav Fröhlich, Willy Fritsch, Paul Hörbiger	
1953	The Bogeyman	Trixie	Carl Boese	Hans Reiser	
1953	I and You	Brigitte	Alfred Weidenmann	Hardy Krüger	
1954	Men at a Dangerous Age	Anna	Carl-Heinz Schroth	Hans Söhnker	
1954	School for Marriage	Marianne	Rainer Geis, Anton Schelkopf	Paul Hubschmid, Cornell Borchers, Wolf Albach-Retty	
1954	Uli the Farmhand	Vreneli	Franz Schnyder	Hannes Schmidhauser	
1954	The Last Summer	Jessika Tolemainen	Harald Braun	Hardy Krüger	
1955	Reaching for the Stars	Christine	Carl-Heinz Schroth	Erik Schumann, Gustav Knuth	
1955	Hanussen	Hilde Graf	O. W. Fischer	O. W. Fischer, Klaus Kinski	
1955	Uli the Tenant	Vreneli	Franz Schnyder	Hannes Schmidhauser	
1955	I Often Think of Piroschka	Piroschka Rácz	Kurt Hoffmann	Gustav Knuth, Gunnar Möller	
1956	My Husband's Getting Married Today	Thesi Petersen	Kurt Hoffmann	Johannes Heesters, Paul Hubschmid	
1957	The Adventures of Arsène Lupin	Mina von Kraft	Jacques Becker	Robert Lamoureux, O. E. Hasse	French film
1957	The Zürich Engagement	Juliane Thomas	Helmut Käutner	Paul Hubschmid, Bernhard Wicki	
1957	Confessions of Felix Krull	Zaza	Kurt Hoffmann	Horst Buchholz	
1958	The Spessart Inn	Franziska von Sandau	Kurt Hoffmann	Carlos Thompson, Günther Lüders, Wolfgang Neuss	
1958	A Time to Love and a Time to Die	Elisabeth Kruse	Douglas Sirk	John Gavin, Erich Maria Remarque	American film
1958	Arms and the Man	Raina Petkoff	Franz Peter Wirth	O. W. Fischer	
1958	The Gambler	Polina	Claude Autant-Lara	Gérard Philipe	French film
1959	The Beautiful Adventure	Dorothée Durand	Kurt Hoffmann	Robert Graf	
1959	The Buddenbrooks	Antonie Buddenbrook	Alfred Weidenmann	Hansjörg Felmy, Nadja Tiller, Hanns Lothar, Lil Dagover	
1960	A Glass of Water	Queen Anne	Helmut Käutner	Gustaf Gründgens	
1960	The Haunted Castle	Charlotte von Sandau	Kurt Hoffmann	Georg Thomalla	
1960	Gustav Adolf's Page	Gustl Leubelfing	Rolf Hansen	Curd Jürgens	
1961	La Fayette	Marie Antoinette	Jean Dréville	Michel Le Royer, Orson Welles, Jack Hawkins, Vittorio De Sica	French film
1961	One, Two, Three	Fräulein Ingeborg	Billy Wilder	James Cagney, Horst Buchholz, Pamela Tiffin, Hanns Lothar	American film
1962	Where the Truth Lies	Catherine	Henri Decoin	Juliette Gréco	French film
1962	Kohlhiesel's Daughters	Liesel Kohlhiesel / Susi Kohlhiesel	Axel von Ambesser	Dietmar Schönherr	
1963	Breakfast in Bed	Liane Clausen	Axel von Ambesser	O.W. Fischer, Lex Barker	
1963	A Nearly Decent Girl	Lili Steiner	Ladislao Vajda	Martin Held, Alberto de Mendoza	
1964	A Global Affair	Sonya	Jack Arnold	Bob Hope, Michèle Mercier	American film
1964	Monsieur	Elizabeth Bernadac	Jean-Paul Le Chanois	Jean Gabin, Philippe Noiret, Mireille Darc	French film
1965	Praetorius	Violetta Höllriegel	Kurt Hoffmann	Heinz Rühmann	
1965	The Man from Cocody	Baby	Christian-Jaque	Jean Marais	French film
1966	Hocuspocus	Agda Kjerulf	Kurt Hoffmann	Heinz Rühmann	
1966	The Nun	Mother de Chelles	Jacques Rivette	Anna Karina	French film
1966	The Rainmaker	Lizzie Curry	Franz Peter Wirth		TV film
1966	The Gardener of Argenteuil	Hilda	Jean-Paul Le Chanois	Jean Gabin, Curd Jürgens	French film
1967	Glorious Times at the Spessart Inn	Anneliese von Sandau	Kurt Hoffmann	Harald Leipnitz, Vivi Bach, Hannelore Elsner	
1969	Pistolen-Jenny	Jenny	Alfred Weidenmann		TV film
1969	The Wedding Trip	Hannelore Schmidt	Ralf Gregan	Dieter Hallervorden	
1970	The Cotton Pickers	Mrs. Pratt	Jürgen Goslar		TV miniseries
1971	Timo	Erika Gerber	Rolf Hädrich		TV series, 13 episodes
1972	Hoopers letzte Jagd	Jenny Richardson	Claus Peter Witt	Horst Tappert	TV film
1972	Five Leaf Clover	Daisy	Edmond Freess	Philippe Noiret	French film
1975	Monika and the Sixteen Year Olds	Mrs. Annelie	Charly Steinberger	Maria Zürer, Oliver Collignon, Klausjürgen Wussow, Teri Tordai	
1979	Bread and Stones	Mrs. Bodenbauer	Mark Rissi	Sigfrit Steiner, Walo Lüönd, Beatrice Kessler	
1986	Le Tiroir secret	Maryse		Michèle Morgan, Jeanne Moreau, Michael Lonsdale	French TV miniseries
1996	The Superwife	Alma Winkel	Sönke Wortmann	Veronica Ferres, Heiner Lauterbach, Til Schweiger	
2004	René Deltgen – Der sanfte Rebell		Michael Wenk	Götz George, Nadja Tiller, Artur Brauner, Michael Verhoeven	Luxembourgish documentary
2007	The Zürich Engagement	herself	Stephan Meyer	Lisa Martinek, Christoph Waltz, Tim Bergmann, Hannelore Hoger, Jan Fedder, Sonja Kirchberger	TV film
