= Doctor Without Scruples =

- Directed by: Falk Harnack
- Screenplay by: Werner P. Zibaso
- Story by: F. D. Andam
- Produced by: Ilse Kubaschewski
- Starring: Ewald Balser; Barbara Rütting; Wolfgang Preiss; Cornell Borchers
- Cinematography: Helmut Ashley
- Edited by: Walter Boos
- Music by: Siegfried Franz
- Production company: KG Divina-Film
- Distributed by: Gloria-Filmverleih
- Release dates: September 4, 1959 (Ufa-Palast, Cologne)
- Running time: 95 minutes
- Country: West Germany
- Language: German

Doctor Without Scruples (German: Arzt ohne Gewissen, lit. 'Doctor without Conscience') is a 1959 West German horror film directed by Falk Harnack. The film revolves around a mad doctor searching for the last secret to heart transplantation.

It premiered on September 4, 1959 at the Ufa-Palast in Cologne. It received its North American premiere in Toronto, Canada on January 10, 1963. Two reviews at the North American premiere were lukewarm towards the film on a whole, but found the acting far above average.

== Cast ==
- Ewald Balser as Professor Lund
- Wolfgang Preiss as Dr. Westorp
- Barbara Rütting as Dr. Marianne Cordt
- Cornell Borchers as Harriet Owen
- Wolfgang Kieling as Dr. Stein
- Erica Beer as Sabine
- Karin Baal as Birke Sawatzki
- Walter Jacob as Detective Inspector Nobis
- Emmerich Schrenk as Detective Constable Pastor
- Giorgio Listuzzi as Paolo Terruzzi

== Development ==
The film was in development under the title Das letzte Geheimnis (lit. The Last Secret).

== Release ==
Doctors Without Scruples was released in West Germany on September 4, 1959 at the Ufa-Palast in Cologne, Germany. It was distributed by Gloria Film.

Doctor Without Scruples had its North American premiere on January 10, 1963, at the Fine Arts Theatre in Toronto, Canada. The film was shown with a 96-minute runtime with English subtitles. It was the first new film show at the Fine Art Theatre, which was formerly the Bayview in Toronto, until it was acquired by new ownership.

== Reception ==
Following its premiere in North America in Toronto, a critic in The Globe and Mail said it was a "run-of-the mill product" while the reviewer in The Toronto Star slow-paced and clumsily made. Both reviewers complimented the acting as being what they expected from the film, with the first newspaper saying it was "uncommonly good" and the latter publication describing Wolfgang Kieling's performance as a highlight.

In Phil Hardy's book Science Fiction (1984), a reviewer found the film similar to in themes another 1959 West German production: The Head (1959) and found the latter film to be the highlight of films involving mad scientists performing experimental surgery from Germany.

== See also ==
- List of German films of 1959
- List of horror films of the 1950s
