= The Haunted Castle (1960 film) =

1960 film

- Film poster
- Directed by: Kurt Hoffmann
- Written by: Günter Neumann; Heinz Pauck
- Produced by: Georg Witt
- Starring: Liselotte Pulver; Heinz Baumann; Georg Thomalla
- Cinematography: Günther Anders
- Edited by: Hilwa von Boro
- Music by: Friedrich Hollaender
- Production company: Georg Witt-Film GmbH
- Distributed by: Constantin Film
- Release date: 15 December 1960
- Running time: 101 minutes
- Country: West Germany
- Language: German

The Haunted Castle (German: Das Spukschloß im Spessart) is a 1960 West German comedy horror film directed by Kurt Hoffmann. It was entered into the 2nd Moscow International Film Festival where it won the Silver Prize. The film is a sequel to The Spessart Inn (1958) and was followed by Glorious Times at the Spessart Inn (1967). It was shot at the Bavaria Studios in Munich. The film's sets were designed by the art directors Hein Heckroth and Willy Schatz.

== Cast ==
- Liselotte Pulver as Charlotte
- Heinz Baumann as Martin Hartog
- Georg Thomalla as Ghost uncle Max
- Hubert von Meyerinck as von Teckel
- Hans Clarin as Prince Kalaka
- Curt Bois as Hugo, a ghost
- Hans Richter as Jockel, a ghost
- Hanne Wieder as Katrin, a ghost
- Paul Esser as Toni, a ghost
- Elsa Wagner as Aunt Yvonne
- Ernst Waldow as Uncle Ernst August
- Herbert Hübner as Hartog
- Veronika Fitz as Sophie
