= Otto Normalverbraucher =

German term for an average person

In the culture of Germany, Otto Normalverbraucher (also Otto Normalbürger, often abbreviated to Otto Normal) is a fictional person with the average needs or characteristics of the general population, i.e., an equivalent of the English term Average Joe. In market research, the name describes the average consumer.

== History ==
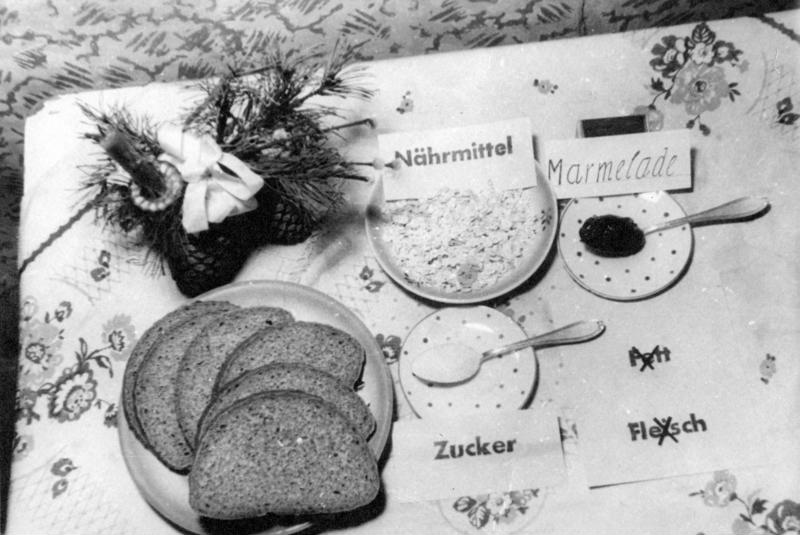
Daily rations for a Normalverbraucher in the British zone, 1948: black bread, Nährmittel (grains, pulses, starches), sugar and marmelade; no fats or meat.

The name was popularized via the 1948 film Berliner Ballade, with the protagonist named Otto Normalverbraucher. The surname comes from a type of ration stamps, "Nur für Normalverbraucher" ("only for normal consumers"), that were issued to people who were not deemed to have special dietary needs—unlike, for example, heavy workers, pregnant women, or the disabled.

Over time it fell out of use in market research and in late 1970s it was replaced with other categories of consumers, standardized by the Sinus-Milieus typology. Still, the term remains in the colloquial use.

== See also ==
- List of terms referring to an average person
- Placeholder name
