= Abschied von den Wolken =

1959 film

- Theatrical release poster
- Directed by: Gottfried Reinhardt
- Written by: Georg Hurdalek
- Produced by: Artur Brauner
- Starring: O. W. Fischer; Peter van Eyck; Sonja Ziemann; Linda Christian
- Cinematography: Klaus von Rautenfeld
- Edited by: Kurt Zeunert
- Music by: Werner Eisbrenner
- Production company: CCC Film
- Distributed by: Omnia Deutsche Film Export
- Release date: 5 November 1959
- Running time: 99 minutes
- Country: West Germany
- Language: German

Abschied von den Wolken (English: Farewell to the Clouds) is a 1959 German aviation adventure film directed by Gottfried Reinhardt, written by Georg Hurdalek, based on a story by Ladislas Fodor. The film stars O. W. Fischer, Peter van Eyck, Sonja Ziemann, Horst Frank, Linda Christian and Paul Dahlke.

Abschied von den Wolken was an example of the disaster film, coming soon after the international success of William Wellman's The High and Mighty (1954) where individual stories of passengers and crew were central to the dilemma of an aircraft in trouble. In the film, film historian Bertil Skogsberg described the scenario aboard an airliner: "The passengers are of various nationalities and dispositions: a revolutionary general fleeing his country with most of its cash, an old Nazi, and a Dutch adventurer, to name only a few. There is also a beautiful stewardess (Sonja Ziemann)".

When marketed in the United States, the film was renamed Rebel Flight to Cuba.

== Plot ==
Leaving the island of San Quinto (Note: San Quinto was a fictional locale.), marked by revolutionary struggles, soldier-of-fortune Peter von Houten barely escapes a firing squad. He is pardoned and is to be deported on a scheduled flight en route from Mexico City to Bermuda. The San Quinto military government, however, forces the airliner down in an unscheduled stop.

Inside the aircraft, Captain Pink Roberti and his copilot Richard Marschall are both in love with the stewardess Carla. In a hijacking attempt of the airliner to Caracas, Roberti is shot and van Houten manages to disarm the attackers but the aircraft landing gear is damaged.

Ultimately, with the copilot unable to successfully master the approach to Bermuda, van Houten, a former pilot, takes charge. He lands safely after a breakneck approach, bringing in the airliner down in a belly landing, saving the lives of passengers, although the aircraft is seriously damaged. The co-pilot dies in the exploding aircraft.

== Cast ==
- O. W. Fischer as Peter van Houten
- Sonja Ziemann as Carla
- Peter van Eyck as Pink Roberti
- Horst Frank as Richard Marshall
- Christian Wolff as Mischa Gomperz
- Paul Dahlke as Dr. Quartz
- Chariklia Baxevanos as Stella Valencias
- Günter Pfitzmann as Howard Sims
- Leon Askin as General Cordobas
- Linda Christian as Countess Colmar
- Erica Beer as Cecily Sims
- Cora Roberts as Doris
- Olga Plüss as François Leclerc
- Silvia Reinhardt as Eva Roberti
- Paul Esser as Monsignor Scarpi
- Martin Berliner as Rabbi Birnbaum
- Friedrich Schoenfelder as Reverend Wilson
- Hans W. Hamacher as Joe
- Werner Stock as 1st chess player
- Hugo Lindinger as 2nd chess player
- Jochen Blume as radio operator Emilio
- Heinz Spitzner as Prof. Thomas
- Bruno W. Pantel as Businessman
- Wolfgang Völz as Engineer Albert
- Gerd Martienzen as Man in the Tower

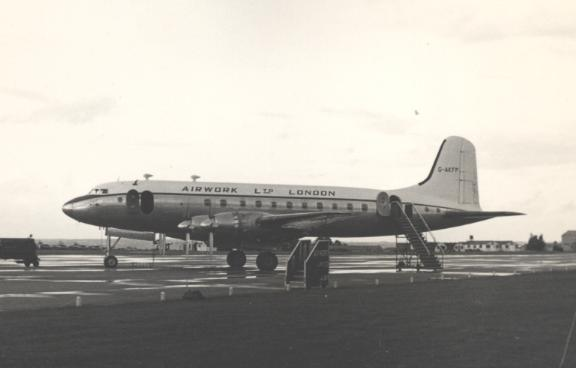
As seen in Abschied von den Wolken, a Handley Page Hermes IV.

== Production ==
Despite being a low-budget film, Abschied von den Wolken used at least one real aircraft, seen in stock footage. Flying for the fictional "Aerovias Internationales", a Handley Page HP. 81 Hermes had the registration "DN-947". The Hermes IV was filmed at Berlin Tempelhof Airport, where the British Skyways of London operated.

A scale model of the Hermes was used for aerial views. Other scenes included a Vickers Viscount take-off and the engines and the landing gear of a Douglas DC-4, a type that resembled the Hermes. A scale model of a Fouga Magister was used to depict a San Quinto military aircraft. Interiors were shot at the Spandau Studios with sets designed by the art directors Paul Markwitz and Heinrich Weidemann.

Using his connections to Hollywood, director Gottfried Reinhardt managed to have Abschied von den Wolken released in the United States. The English-language version was re-titled Rebel Flight to Cuba.

== Reception ==
Film historian and critic Ephraim Katz wrote in the International Film Encyclopedia (1990), "O.W. Fischer as a jack-of-all-trades and unshaven friend of humanity aboard an airliner threatened by storms, criminals and technical catastrophes. Staged according to common patterns, the bundling of adventurous moments of danger does not contribute to the credibility of the story."

== See also ==
- Zero Hour! (1957)
