= Leichte Kavallerie =

1866 operetta by Franz von Suppé

- Operetta by Franz von Suppé
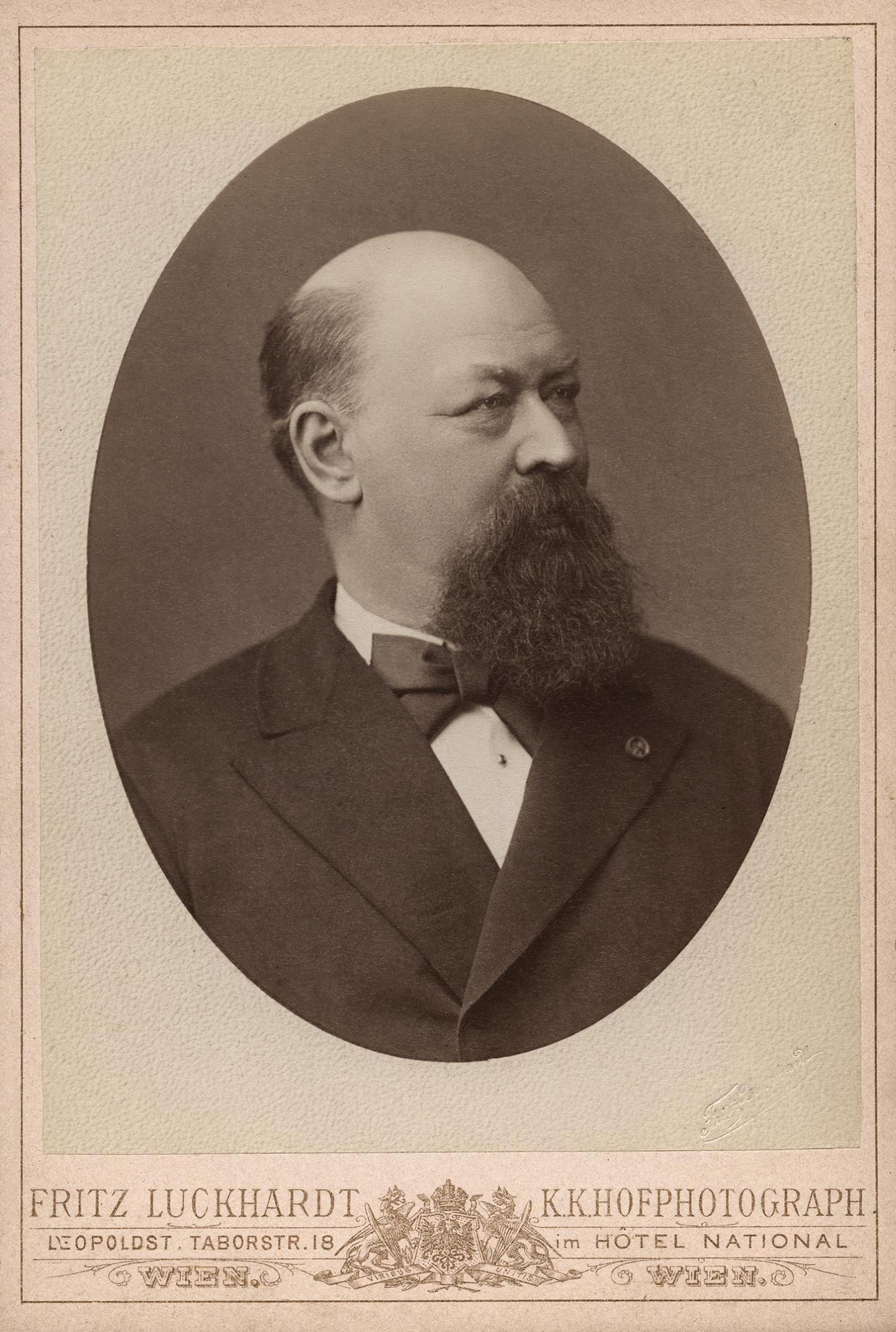
- The composer of the operetta, c. 1885
- Translation: Light Cavalry
- Librettist: Karl Costa
- Language: German
- Premiere: 21 March 1866; Carltheater, Vienna

Leichte Kavallerie (Light Cavalry) is an operetta in two acts by Franz von Suppé, with a libretto by Karl Costa. It was first performed in the Carltheater, Vienna, on 21 March 1866.

The original work is set in a 19th-century Austrian village where several love intrigues and the discovery of a father-daughter relationship are accompanied by the arrival of a regiment of hussars. In 1934, Hans Bodenstedt completely rewrote the operetta. It was set in the 18th century amid the court intrigues of a Baron and his Hungarian Countess lover, whose ballet company is referred to as the "light cavalry".

While much of the operetta remains in relative obscurity, the Light Cavalry Overture is one of Suppé's best known works. The music from the operetta was used as the soundtrack of a film of the same name in 1935.

== Roles ==
Overture
The overture to Leichte Kavallerie, played by the United States Marine Band

Role	Voice type	Premiere cast, 21 March 1866 (Conductor: –)
Bums, the mayor	bass	Louis Grois
Apollonia, his wife	contralto	Minna Walter
Jimber Pankraz, a grocer	spoken	Josef Matras
Eulalia, his wife	mezzo-soprano	Bachmann
Weissling, the baker	spoken	
Dorothea, his daughter	soprano	
Kitt, a glazier	spoken	
Regina, his daughter	soprano	
Vilma, an orphan	soprano	Karoline Mayer
Hermann, Vilma's lover	tenor	Albert Telek
Janos, a hussar	bass	Karl Treumann
Stefan, a hussar	tenor	Franz Eppich
Carol, a hussar	Voll	

== Plot ==
=== Act 1 - The Marketplace ===
Vilma is an orphan who was educated by the community. Now she has become a pretty young woman and draws the attention of all men, including those who are already married. In response, the men's wives complain to the mayor, Bums, and the council begins to investigate Vilma's behavior. Bums and Pankraz are secretly in love with Vilma, but at the urging of their jealous wives, they have to convene a council to end the banishment of Vilma. The councilors come to no result (song "How clever, how clever, we from the G'meind").

Vilma does not care about the men's talk, because she is in love with Hermann. This idyll is interrupted by the entry of Hungarian Hussars. Under the leadership of their sergeant Janos, the men at the council move into quarters with the citizens, while the female population welcomes the soldiers with cheers.

=== Act 2 - The Marketplace ===
Hermann tries to marry Vilma, but to no avail. His guardian, Mayor Bums, refuses his approval, but he still hopes for the young pretty woman. Disappointed, Hermann attempts to join the Hussars and talks to Janos. Janos wants to help Hermann, because he has since noticed for himself the way the decency in this village is ordered. Therefore, he decides to play a trick on the women and men of the village to teach them a lesson.

Janos secretly promises to arrange a tête-à-tête for Bums and Pankraz with Vilma. Instead of Vilma, though, he lures Eulalia, the wife of Pankraz, to this rendezvous. Eulalia, who is not averse to an affair with Janos, decides to meet Janos at this meeting place. This arranges it so that Apollonia, the wife of Bums, is nearby and can eavesdrop the whole affair. Coincidentally, Carol and Stefan meet at this meeting point in the dark with the civic daughters Dorothea and Regina.

Janos takes pity on the unfortunate lovers, Hermann and Vilma, as he had experienced a similar situation in his youth. When he was young, he loved Zinka, whom he was not allowed to marry because of his poverty. He was forced to leave her and never saw her again. Remembering his old love, he recalls a song he always sang with Zinka, which he claims is a song that only he knows. Suddenly, he hears the same song. But it is not Zinka, but Vilma, who sings this sad song. She learned it from her mother in her childhood.

Janos searches for the singer in the darkness and finds Vilma. His questions indicate that, much to his surprise, Vilma is his daughter. As great as the joy is over finding his daughter, so is his anger at the treatment of Vilma in this city. The scheme he devised is completed, and after all involved in Vilma's mistreatment have been made to look as ridiculous as possible, Janos forces the mayor to agree to the wedding between Vilma and Hermann.

When Bums is forced to give his blessing, the signal sounds to march off. The Hussars gather in the marketplace and ride happily back, just as they came. The Light Cavalry has done its duty.

== See also ==
- Light Cavalry
