= Invitation (1952 film) =

1952 film directed by Gottfried Reinhardt

- Directed by: Gottfried Reinhardt
- Written by: Paul Osborn
- Based on: R.S.V.P. by Jerome Weidman
- Produced by: Lawrence Weingarten
- Starring: Van Johnson; Dorothy McGuire; Ruth Roman
- Cinematography: Ray June
- Edited by: George Boemler
- Music by: Bronislau Kaper
- Production company: Metro-Goldwyn-Mayer
- Distributed by: Metro-Goldwyn-Mayer
- Release dates: January 29, 1952 (New York); February 27, 1952 (Los Angeles)
- Running time: 84 minutes
- Country: United States
- Language: English
- Budget: $1,020,000
- Box office: $1,455,000

Invitation is a 1952 American melodrama film directed by Gottfried Reinhardt and starring Van Johnson, Dorothy McGuire and Ruth Roman. The screenplay is based on the short story "R.S.V.P." by Jerome Weidman. The film's theme song "Invitation" has become a jazz standard.

== Plot ==
Architect Dan Pierce and his wife Ellen are happily married. However, Ellen's heart is weak because of a childhood bout of rheumatic fever, and she must be careful to avoid overexertion. Her wealthy father and family doctor know that she has only a few more months to live, but they have not informed her.

When Ellen visits acquaintance Maud Redwick, Dan's embittered former girlfriend, Maud reminds Ellen about a vicious remark that Maud had spoken at Ellen and Dan's wedding, saying that Dan was only a "loan" to Ellen for about a year. Ellen gathers other clues, such as an invitation for Dan to attend a medical conference, that lead her to the truth about her prognosis and another devastating secret: her father had arranged the marriage to make her happy, and Dan did not love her.

When Dan learns that Ellen knows the truth, he confesses through flashbacks that he had initially rejected her father's offer, but without success in his career, he had married her at her father's behest. However, he has since fallen deeply in love with her.

Dan tells Ellen about a doctor who has devised a new technique that has a promising chance of curing her. He begs her to undergo the operation that he has arranged for her. If it is a success, they will know by spring. She agrees to submit to the medical procedure. In the spring, she is healthy and still happily married to Dan.

== Cast ==
- Van Johnson as Daniel I. Pierce
- Dorothy McGuire as Ellen Bowker Pierce
- Ruth Roman as Maud Redwick
- Louis Calhern as Simon Bowker
- Ray Collins as Dr. Warren Pritchard
- Michael Chekhov as Dr. Fromm
- Lisa Golm as Agnes
- Barbara Ruick as Sarah
- Norman Field as Arthur
- Matt Moore as Paul
- Pat Conway as Bill
- Alex Gerry as Professor Redwick
- Lucille Curtis as Mrs. Redwick
- Lisa Gohm as Agnes

== Music ==
The theme music by Bronislau Kaper was originally used in A Life of Her Own (1950), but it became a jazz standard after its use in Invitation and was given the same title.

== Reception ==
In a contemporary review for the Los Angeles Times, critic Edwin Schallert wrote: "The picture suffers from plot strain and a mechanical sort of premise. But it is deftly dealt with by the cast ... Miss McGuire carries this role with marked sensitiveness, and while some scenes lack the ingredient to make them ring absolutely, she conveys the theme and thought of the picture admirably. There will unquestionably be tears as a token of the worth of the work done by the primary actors. ... There is a minor threat of the seriousness being too patent for certain audiences. But the elusive way in which the idea for the picture is made known, and the quality effort by all concerned dignifies 'Invitation' above the ordinary run of pictures."

According to MGM records, the film earned $855,000 in the U.S. and Canada and $600,000 elsewhere, resulting in a loss of $178,000.
