= The Spendthrift (1964 film) =

1964 film

- Directed by: Kurt Meisel
- Written by: Ferdinand Raimund (play)
- Starring: Christiane Hörbiger; Wolfgang Gasser; Walther Reyer
- Cinematography: Elio Carniel
- Edited by: Paula Dvorak
- Music by: Konradin Kreutzer
- Production companies: Burgtheater Wien; Neue Thalia-Film
- Distributed by: Union-Film
- Release date: January 1964
- Running time: 110 minutes
- Country: Austria
- Language: German

The Spendthrift (German: Der Verschwender) is a 1964 Austrian historical film directed by Kurt Meisel and starring Christiane Hörbiger, Wolfgang Gasser and Walther Reyer. It is an adaptation of Ferdinand Raimund's play of the same name.

== Cast ==
- Christiane Hörbiger as Fairy Cheristane
- Wolfgang Gasser as Azur, ihr dienstbarer Geist
- Walther Reyer as Julius von Flottwell
- Heinz Moog as Wolf, sein Kammerdienter
- Josef Meinrad as Valentin, sein Bedienter
- Inge Konradi as Rosa, Kammermädchen
- Wolfgang Hebenstreit as Gründling, Baumeister
- Hanns Obonya as Sockel, Baumeister
- Boy Gobert as Chevalier Dumont
- Karl Blühm as Herr von Pralling
- Hannes Schiel as Herr von Helm
- Tonio Riedl as Herr von Walter
- Fred Hennings as Präsident von Klugheim
- Loni von Friedl as Amalie, seine Tochter
- Andreas Wolf as Baron Flitterstein
- Adrienne Gessner as Ein altes Weib
- Viktor Braun as Ein Haushofmeister
- Fritz Hinz-Fabricius as Ein Juwelier
- Walter Stummvoll as Ein Kellermeister
- Ulli Fessl as Betti, Kammermädchen
- Hans Brand as Ein Arzt
- Richard Eybner as Johann, Bedienter
- Tom Krinzinger as Fritz, Bedienter
- Johannes Neuhauser as Diener bei Wolf
- Georg Filser as Diener bei Flottwell
- Josef Krastel as Ein Gärtner
- Klein-Frodel as Hiesel
- Klein-Galotzky as Michel
- Klein-Habermann as Liese
- Klein-Prägler as Hansel
- Klein-Schweiger as Pepi

== Bibliography ==
- Goble, Alan. The Complete Index to Literary Sources in Film. Walter de Gruyter, 1999.
