= Axel von Ambesser =

German playwright and film director

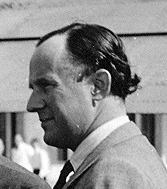
- Axel von Ambesser in 1950
- Born: 22 June 1910; Hamburg, German Empire
- Died: 16 September 1988 (aged 78); Munich, West Germany
- Other name: Axel Eugen Alexander von Österreich
- Occupations: Film actor and film director
- Years active: 1935–1988

Axel Eugen Alexander von Oesterreich (22 June 1910 – 16 September 1988), better known as Axel von Ambesser, was a German playwright, actor and film director.

Ambesser's father was Alexander Constantin von Oesterreich. Ambesser was born in Hamburg and attended Wilhelm-Gymnasium. He appeared as a stage actor in the Hamburg Kammerspiele, and went on to play in the Stadttheater Augsburg, the Münchner Kammerspiele, from 1937 the Deutsche Theater Berlin, from 1942 the Staatstheater Berlin, and the Theater in der Josefstadt in Vienna.

== Works ==
- Das Abgründige in Herrn Gerstenberg, play, 1946
- Begegnung im Herbst, play, 1967

== Selected filmography ==
Actor

- The King's Prisoner (1935) - Tanzmeister
- A Hopeless Case (1939) - Verehrer
- Salonwagen E 417 (1939) - Ursulas Bräutigam Werner
- Die unheimlichen Wünsche (1939) - Jouet, Luftschiffer
- Eine kleine Nachtmusik (1939) - Baron Egon
- Ritorno (1940)
- Traummusik (1940) - Maestro Hutten
- The Heart of a Queen (1940) - Prinz Henry Darnley
- Annelie (1941) - Georg
- Tanz mit dem Kaiser (1941) - Kaiser Joseph II.
- Women Are No Angels (1943) - Richard Anden
- Carnival of Love (1943) - Pianist Frank
- Die kluge Marianne (1943) - Baldi
- Der Mann, dem man den Namen stahl (1944) - Fridolin Beidermann
- Das Mädchen Juanita (1945) - Robert Henseling
- The Adventures of Fridolin (1948) - Fridolin Biedermann
- Verspieltes Leben (1949) - Stefan Marbach
- Verlobte Leute (1950) - Hans Schmidt, der Maler
- Three Girls Spinning (1950) - Professor Hartwig
- Dreaming Days (1951) - Herr Berger
- Kommen Sie am Ersten (1951) - Kommentator (voice)
- Der Mann in der Wanne (1952)
- Ich hab' mich so an Dich gewöhnt (1952) - Kommentator
- Dancing Stars (1952) - Sir Thomas Gregorian
- Drei, von denen man spricht (1953) - Direktor Brand
- Die Freundin meines Mannes (1957) - Mann im Flugzeug
- Adorable Arabella (1959) - Lord Fleetwood
- The Good Soldier Schweik (1960) - Narrator (voice, uncredited)
- Gustav Adolf's Page (1960) - Wallenstein
- It Can't Always Be Caviar (1961) - Narrator (voice)
- Breakfast in Bed (1963) - Narrator (voice, uncredited)
- Es war mir ein Vergnügen (1963) - Thomas Andermatt
- I Learned It from Father (1964) - Regisseur / Himself - Narrator (uncredited)
- Who Wants to Sleep? (1965) - Ronald
- Die fromme Helene (1965) - Wilhelm Busch

Director

- Drei, von denen man spricht (1953) — (based on Youth at the Helm)
- Bruder Martin (1954) — (based on a play by Karl Costa)
- Her First Date (1955) — (screenplay by Max Colpet, remake of Premier rendez-vous)
- Die Freundin meines Mannes (1957)
- The Crammer (1958)
- Frau im besten Mannesalter (1959)
- Die schöne Lügnerin (1959) — (based on a play by Ernst Nebhut and Just Scheu)
- Adorable Arabella (1959) — (based on Arabella by Georgette Heyer)
- The Good Soldier Schweik (1960) — (based on The Good Soldier Švejk)
- Crook and the Cross (1960)
- One Prettier Than the Other (1961)
- He Can't Stop Doing It (1962) — (Father Brown film)
- Kohlhiesel's Daughters (1962) — (remake of Kohlhiesels Töchter)
- Breakfast in Bed (1963) — (based on a novel by S. Fischer-Fabian)
- I Learned It from Father (1964)
- Marry Me, Cherie (1964) — (based on a novel by Gábor Vaszary)
- Who Wants to Sleep? (1965, anthology film)
- Die fromme Helene (1965) — (based on illustrated stories by Wilhelm Busch)
- Die schöne Helena (1975, TV film) — (based on the opera La belle Hélène)
