= Paul Esser =

German actor and voice actor (1913–1988)

- Born: 24 April 1913; Berlin, Germany
- Died: 20 January 1988 (aged 74); Tenerife, Canary Islands
- Occupation: Actor
- Years active: 1941–1988

Paul Esser (24 April 1913 – 20 January 1988) was a German stage and television actor and voice actor. He is remembered for playing the lead role in the Sender Freies Berlin version of the detective series Tatort. Esser was born in Geldern-Kapellen and died in Tenerife.

== Selected filmography ==
- The Gasman (1941)
- Liebesgeschichten (1943) - Oskar - 20 Jahre
- Rotation (1949) - Hans Behnke
- Der Kahn der fröhlichen Leute (1950) - Heinrich, Musiker
- The Merry Wives of Windsor (1950) - Sir John Falstaff (Johannes Spenser)
- Heart of Stone (1950) - Ezechiel
- Man of Straw (1951) - Regierungspräsident von Wulckow
- Homesick for You (1952) - Otto Klemke
- Christina (1953) - Fritz Ohlsen, Knecht
- The Immortal Vagabond (1953) - Florian
- A Life for Do (1954) - Onkel Karl
- Prisoners of Love (1954) - Max
- Hoheit lassen bitten (1954) - Bauunternehmer Kehlbach
- Island of the Dead (1955) - Fritz Kahlmayer
- Son Without a Home (1955) - Ludwig Steiner
- Your Life Guards (1955) - Oberst
- Urlaub auf Ehrenwort (1955) - Offc. Paul Hartmann
- Johannisnacht (1956) - Verwalter Lamm
- Das Hirtenlied vom Kaisertal (1956) - Der Pfarrer
- Different from You and Me (1957) - Kommissar
- The Spessart Inn (1957) - Friedrich Roeckel
- Precocious Youth (1957) - Herr Messmann
- The Spessart Inn (1958) - Corporal
- The Gambler (1958)
- Restless Night (1958) - Zahlmeister
- Der Schinderhannes (1958) - Schmied Schauwecker
- For Love and Others (1959) - Hauptwachtmeister Siegel (Episode Hamburg)
- The Beautiful Adventure (1959) - Olivon
- Two Times Adam, One Time Eve (1959) - Rat Granberg
- Abschied von den Wolken (1959) - Monsignore Scarpi
- Ein Herz braucht Liebe (1960)
- Yes, Women are Dangerous (1960) - Kapitän Friedrichsen
- Twenty Brave Men (1960) - Obergefreiter Karl
- The Haunted Castle (1960) - Toni, a ghost
- The Endless Night (1963) - J. M. Schreiber
- Wochentags immer (1963) - Onkel
- Das Haus auf dem Hügel (1964) - Inspektor Antoine Creux
- Not Reconciled (1965)
- Glorious Times at the Spessart Inn (1967) - Mönch
- La moglie giapponese (1968) - Ferrante
- If It's Tuesday, This Must Be Belgium (1969) - German Sergeant
- Pippi Longstocking (1969, TV Series) - Blom
- Pippi Longstocking (1969) - Bloom
- The Sweet Pussycats (1969) - Richter (uncredited)
- Herzblatt oder Wie sag ich’s meiner Tochter? (1969) - Max
- Pippi Goes on Board (1969) - Blom
- What Is the Matter with Willi? (1970) - Motzmann
- Daughters of Darkness (1971) - Hotel clerk
- Our Willi Is the Best (1971) - Herr Kaiser
- Emil i Lönneberga (1971) - Doktorn
- Nya hyss av Emil i Lönneberga (1972) - Doktorn
- The Sibyl Cipher (1973)
- Tatort (1971-1974, TV Series) - Gastkommissar Kasulke
- The Roaring Fifties (1983) - Senator Hilton
