= Adorable Arabella =

1959 film directed by Axel von Ambesser

- Directed by: Axel von Ambesser
- Written by: Peter Berneis; Fritz Eckhardt
- Based on: Arabella by Georgette Heyer
- Produced by: Georg M. Reuther
- Starring: Johanna von Koczian; Carlos Thompson; Hilde Hildebrand
- Cinematography: Günther Senftleben
- Edited by: Ingrid Wacker
- Music by: Hans-Martin Majewski
- Production company: Rhombus Film
- Distributed by: UFA
- Release date: 22 December 1959
- Running time: 87 minutes
- Country: West Germany
- Language: German

Adorable Arabella (German: Bezaubernde Arabella) is a 1959 West German comedy film directed by Axel von Ambesser and starring Johanna von Koczian, Carlos Thompson and Hilde Hildebrand. It is an adaptation of the 1949 novel Arabella by Georgette Heyer.

The film's sets were designed by the art directors Gottfried Will and Rolf Zehetbauer. It was shot using Agfacolor, with location shooting taking place around Coburg in Bavaria. It premiered just before Christmas 1959 in Cologne. The film was part of the production programme of the recently relaunched UFA company.

== Synopsis ==
The story is set in the early years of the 20th century. A young German woman whose father has recently died is sent to visit her relatives in Edwardian England in the hope of attracting a wealthy husband.

== Cast ==
- Johanna von Koczian as Arabella
- Carlos Thompson as Robert Beaumaris
- Hilde Hildebrand as Lady Bridlington
- Axel von Ambesser as Lord Fleetwood
- Peer Schmidt as Gordon Blair
- Hans Nielsen as Vater Hagemann
- Josef Meinrad as Sir Archibald Duncan
- Fritz Eckhardt as Hill, Bierbrauer
- Gregor von Rezzori as Sir Roderick Crawford
- Käthe Haack as Mutter Reger
- Christian Doermer as Helmut Hagemann
- Karin Himboldt as Harriet
- Ulla Moritz as Charlotte
- Michaela Heine as Elschen
- Alexander von Richthofen as Karl-Heinz
- Franz-Otto Krüger as Herr Schnering
- Emmy Burg as Frau Schnering
- Reinhold Pasch as Bill, Verwalter

== Bibliography ==
- Bock, Hans-Michael & Bergfelder, Tim. The Concise CineGraph. Encyclopedia of German Cinema. Berghahn Books, 2009.
- Goble, Alan. The Complete Index to Literary Sources in Film. Walter de Gruyter, 1999.
