= Gustav Adolf's Page =

1960 film

- Directed by: Rolf Hansen
- Written by: Conrad Ferdinand Meyer (novel); Peter Goldbaum; Juliane Kay; Tibor Yost
- Produced by: Peter Goldbaum; Heinz Pollak; Rudolf Stering
- Starring: Liselotte Pulver; Curd Jürgens; Ellen Schwiers
- Cinematography: Günther Anders
- Edited by: Anna Höllering
- Music by: Anton Profes
- Production company: Wiener Mundus-Film
- Distributed by: Neue Filmverleih
- Release date: 23 December 1960
- Running time: 93 minutes
- Countries: Austria; West Germany
- Language: German

Gustav Adolf's Page (German: Gustav Adolfs Page) is a 1960 West German-Austrian historical adventure film directed by Rolf Hansen and starring Liselotte Pulver, Curd Jürgens, and Ellen Schwiers. It is based on the 1882 novel of the same title by Conrad Ferdinand Meyer. It was shot at the Rosenhügel Studios in Vienna and on location in the Bavarian town of Rothenburg ob der Tauber. The film's sets were designed by the art directors Robert Herlth, Leo Metzenbauer and Arno Richter.

== Cast ==
- Liselotte Pulver as Page Gustl Leublfing
- Curd Jürgens as König Gustav Adolf
- Ellen Schwiers as Korinna
- Walther Reyer as Hauptmann Roland
- Helmut Schmid as Herzog von Lauenburg
- Hans Nielsen as Bürgermeister Leublfing
- Eddi Arent as Anton Leublfing
- Lina Carstens as Haushälterin Therese
- Vera Comployer as Wirtin
- Richard Eybner as Seni
- Gabriele Reismüller as Königin Maria Eleonora
- Fred Liewehr as Ottavio Piccolomini
- Axel von Ambesser as Wallenstein

== Bibliography ==
- Bock, Hans-Michael; Bergfelder, Tim, eds. (2009). The Concise Cinegraph: Encyclopaedia of German Cinema. New York: Berghahn Books. ISBN 978-1-57181-655-9.
