= Hannes Schiel =

Austrian actor

Hannes Schiel (31 May 1914 – 2 December 2017) was an Austrian actor.

Schiel was born in Vienna in 1914, and studied law at the University of Graz before becoming an actor. He began acting at a theatre in Innsbruck, then moved to Volkstheater in Vienna. From 1959 to 1979, Schiel was active in Burgtheater productions. He died in December 2017, at the age of 103.

== Filmography ==
Year	Title	Role	Notes
1949	Duel with Death	Rainer, Standartenführer der SS	
1951	Asphalt		
1955	The Last Ten Days	SS-Obersturmbannführer Otto Günsche	
1955	Dunja		
1955	08/15 - In der Heimat	Oberst Gerorg Hauk	
1956	Weil du arm bist, mußt du früher sterben	Direktor Franzen	
1956	Fidelio	Don Pizarro	
1956	Fruit in the Neighbour's Garden	Versicherungsdirektor Usedom	
1957	Flucht in die Tropennacht	Murphy	
1957	Wetterleuchten um Maria	Anton Sägmüller	
1957	Vienna, City of My Dreams	Oberstleutnant Morosos	
1960	Frauen in Teufels Hand	Sturmbannführer des SD Redwitz	
1960	Twenty Brave Men	German Captain	
1961	Der Orgelbauer von St. Marien		Uncredited
1964	The Spendthrift	Herr von Helm	
1965	Der Alpenkönig und der Menschenfeind	Linarius	
1966	Congress of Love	Emperor Franz Josef	
