= Five Leaf Clover =

1972 film

- Directed by: Edmond Freess
- Written by: Pierre Fabre; Edmond Freess
- Produced by: Simone Allouche; François de Lannurien
- Starring: Philippe Noiret; Liselotte Pulver; Micha Bayard
- Cinematography: Raoul Coutard
- Edited by: Nicole Allouche; Aline Asséo; Claire Giniewski; Raymonde Guyot
- Music by: Georges Moustaki; Hubert Rostaing
- Production company: Productions FDI
- Release date: 23 August 1972
- Running time: 90 minutes
- Country: France
- Language: French

Five Leaf Clover (French: Le trèfle à cinq feuilles) is a 1972 French comedy film directed by Edmond Freess and starring Philippe Noiret, Liselotte Pulver and Micha Bayard.

== Cast ==
- Philippe Noiret as Alfred
- Liselotte Pulver as Daisy
- Micha Bayard as Germaine Constant
- Maurice Biraud as Georges-André Constant
- Jean Carmet as Lord Picratt
- Jean-Roger Caussimon as Vampirus
- Barbara Cederlung as Isabelle
- Monique Chaumette as Marie-Berthe
- Pierre Fabre as Ferdinand
- Thalie Frugès as Chloë
- Corinne Koeningswarter as Isalaide
- Bernard La Jarrige
- Ginette Leclerc as L'épicière
- Paul Préboist as Léon Constant

== Bibliography ==
- Hans-Michael Bock and Tim Bergfelder. The Concise Cinegraph: An Encyclopedia of German Cinema. Berghahn Books.
