= Kohlhiesel's Daughters (1962 film) =

1962 film

- Directed by: Axel von Ambesser
- Starring: Helmut Schmid; Liselotte Pulver; Peter Vogel
- Release date: 1962
- Running time: 64 minutes
- Country: Germany
- Language: German

Kohlhiesel's Daughters (German: Kohlhiesels Töchter) is a 1962 German comedy film directed by Axel von Ambesser and starring Liselotte Pulver, Helmut Schmid and Dietmar Schönherr. One of Kohlhiesel's daughters falls in love, but he refuses to allow her to marry until her sister has found a husband.

== Plot ==
Liesel has studied hotel management at Munich and returns to her hometown of Hinterflüh, where her father and twin sister Susi run the family's inn. Former boyfriend Toni is seeking to rekindle the relationship, but the time apart has estranged them. Günter, an acquaintance from Munich, follows Liesel, takes on a job at the inn and also courts her. Liesel feels drawn to Günter, who is educated and well-mannered, whereas Susi favors Toni, a wealthy and successful hands-on farmer. Toni however is not interested in Susi because of her ghastly appearance and rude behavior.

Both men learn that the twins' mother's dying wish was Susi to be married off first, a request the whole family takes serious. Günter talks Toni into marrying Susi, with the goal in mind to cause the marriage to fail and divorce her. Thus the late mother's condition would have been met and Toni eventually could marry Liesel. At his wedding Toni gets drunk and misses the wedding night. The next morning he deliberately starts a fight with Susi, who turns to her sister for help. Liesel changes Susi's attire and hairdo in order to resemble her own appearance and gives her advice on good housekeeping. Toni is genuinely taken by surprise and actually falls in love with Susi. As he still feels obligated to Liesel, he pleads Günter to marry her, who agrees willingly.

== Cast ==
- Liselotte Pulver as Liesel Kohlhiesel / Susi Kohlhiesel
- Helmut Schmid as Toni
- Dietmar Schönherr as Günter Krüger
- Peter Vogel as Rolf
- Heinrich Gretler as Vater Kohlhiesel
- Adeline Wagner as Evelyn
- Franz-Otto Krüger as Portier Müller
- Renate Kasché as Gritli

== Background ==
The 1962 film was already the fifth dramatization for the screen. Originally created as a droll story for the stage by Hanns Kräly, it was first adapted as a movie in 1920 by Ernst Lubitsch and had seen remakes in 1930, 1943 and 1955. This version changed the location from Bavaria, Germany to the Bernese Oberland, Switzerland, due to the female lead who made use of her native tongue in portraying Susi. A rather confusing alteration was the renaming of the female characters, in the stage play the amiable daughter is called Gretel and her obnoxious twin is called Liesel. The reason for the change is a musical number whose lyrics only rhyme with Susi but none of the other names.
