= Nine Boys, One Heart =

- Édith Piaf in a scene from the film
- Directed by: Georges Friedland
- Written by: Norbert Carbonnaux; Georges Friedland
- Produced by: Robert Tarcali
- Starring: Édith Piaf; Lucien Baroux; Marcel Vallée
- Cinematography: Charles Bauer
- Edited by: Léonid Elkind
- Music by: Robert Chauvigny; Norbert Glanzberg; Curt Lewinnek; Louiguy; Mireille; Marguerite Monnot; Charles Trenet; Jean Villard
- Production company: Vox Films
- Distributed by: Astra Paris Films
- Release date: 15 February 1948
- Running time: 85 minutes
- Country: France
- Language: French

Nine Boys, One Heart (French: Neuf garçons, un coeur) is a 1948 French musical film directed by Georges Friedland and starring Édith Piaf, Lucien Baroux and Marcel Vallée.

It was shot at the Billancourt Studios in Paris. The film's sets were designed by the art director Lucien Aguettand.

== Cast ==
- Édith Piaf as Christine
- Les Compagnons de la Chanson as Eux-mêmes / Themselves
- Lucien Baroux as Victor
- Marcel Vallée as Le patron du Paradise
- Elisabeth Wells as Lisa
- Lucien Nat as Le monsieur

== Bibliography ==
- Rège, Philippe. Encyclopedia of French Film Directors, Volume 1. Scarecrow Press, 2009.
