= Romance in Venice =

- Directed by: Eduard von Borsody
- Written by: Theodor Ottawa; Eduard von Borsody
- Produced by: Eduard Hoesch; Herta Hoesch
- Starring: Ann Smyrner; Walther Reyer; Willy Birgel
- Cinematography: Václav Vích
- Edited by: Renate Jelinek
- Music by: Heinz Neubrand
- Production companies: Bavaria Film; Donau-Filmproduktion
- Distributed by: Bavaria Film
- Release date: 28 September 1962
- Running time: 90 minutes
- Country: Austria
- Language: German

Romance in Venice (German: Romanze in Venedig) is a 1962 Austrian romance film directed by Eduard von Borsody and starring Ann Smyrner, Walther Reyer and Willy Birgel.

It was shot at the Bavaria Studios in Munich and the Rosenhügel Studios in Vienna. The film's sets were designed by the art director Hans Zehetner.

== Cast ==
- Ann Smyrner as Andrea von Bruggern
- Walther Reyer as Stefan
- Willy Birgel as Theodor von Bruggern
- Annie Rosar as Barbara
- Jane Tilden as Bettina
- Erwin Strahl as Nikolaus
- Olga von Togni
- Sylvia Holzmayer
- Johannes Bonaventura
- Egon von Jordan
- Josef Krastel
- Fritz Hinz-Fabricius
- Wolfgang Hebenstreit
- Oskar Wegrostek
- Herbert Fux as Servant at Villa in Venice
- Hermann Thimig as Pfarrer

== Bibliography ==
- Bergfelder, Tim & Bock, Hans-Michael. The Concise Cinegraph: Encyclopedia of German. Berghahn Books, 2009.
