= La Fayette (film) =

- Directed by: Jean Dréville
- Written by: Jean Bernard-Luc; Jean Dréville; François Ponthier; Suzy Prim; Jacques Sigurd
- Produced by: Jean Dréville
- Starring: Pascale Audret; Jack Hawkins; Michel Le Royer; Orson Welles
- Cinematography: Roger Hubert; Claude Renoir
- Edited by: René Le Hénaff
- Music by: Pierre Duclos; Steve Laurent
- Production companies: Les Films Copernic; Cosmos
- Distributed by: Comacico (France)
- Release date: 8 February 1962 (France)
- Running time: 158 minutes
- Countries: France; Italy
- Languages: French; English
- Budget: $2 million
- Box office: $100,000 (US/Canada rentals)

La Fayette is a 1961 French-Italian epic biographical film directed by Jean Dréville and starring Michel Le Royer, Pascale Audret, Jack Hawkins and Orson Welles. The film depicts the life of Gilbert du Motier, Marquis de Lafayette, in particular his role in the American War of Independence.

== Cast ==
- Michel Le Royer - La Fayette
- Howard St. John - George Washington
- Orson Welles - Benjamin Franklin
- Pascale Audret - Adrienne de La Fayette
- Jack Hawkins - General Cornwallis
- Liselotte Pulver - Marie Antoinette
- Folco Lulli - Le Boursier
- Wolfgang Preiss - Baron Kalb
- Edmund Purdom - Silas Deane
- Georges Rivière - Vergennes
- Rosanna Schiaffino - Comtesse de Simiane
- Vittorio De Sica - Aaron Bancroft
- Jacques Castelot - Duc d'Ayen
- Jean-Roger Caussimon - Maurepas
- Jean-Jacques Delbo - L'exempt

== Critical reception ==
Allmovie wrote, "the story of a Frenchman who fought to liberate the American colonies from British rule is colorfully brought to the screen...Orson Welles gives a memorable performance as Benjamin Franklin"; while TV Guide found "the picture is weighed down by its need for spectacle, and displays little grace in its presentation. It boasts two of cinema's greatest directors as part of the cast--Welles, doing his best as Ben Franklin, and De Sica."

== See also ==
- List of films about the American Revolution
- List of television series and miniseries about the American Revolution
