= A Prize of Arms =

1962 British film by Cliff Owen

- Theatrical release poster
- Directed by: Cliff Owen
- Written by: Kevin Kavanagh; Nicolas Roeg
- Produced by: George Maynard
- Starring: Stanley Baker; Helmut Schmid; Tom Bell
- Cinematography: Gerald Gibbs; Gilbert Taylor
- Edited by: John Jympson
- Music by: Robert Sharples
- Distributed by: Bryanston Films (UK)
- Release date: 12 October 1962
- Running time: 105 minutes
- Country: United Kingdom
- Language: English
- Budget: £258,149
- Box office: £43,000

A Prize of Arms is a 1962 British crime film directed by Cliff Owen and starring Stanley Baker, Helmut Schmid, Patrick Magee and Tom Bell. It was written by Kevin Kavanagh and Nicolas Roeg.

Set in 1956, the film follows a criminal gang as it tries to rob an army pay convoy during the Suez Crisis.

== Plot ==
Three criminals have hatched a plan to rob an army barracks. The troops are about to be dispatched to take part in a war in the Middle East and there is believed to be a large amount of pay on the premises, to be shipped out with them.

The gang enters an army barracks, disguised as soldiers and proceeds to the pay corps headquarters where, under the guise of maintenance work, they make sure that the alarms are disabled – which will give them time to make their escape once the robbery takes place.

For the rest of the day they try to integrate themselves into the workings of the base, including being vaccinated for Overseas service, to avoid attracting attention. As night falls, they change into military police uniforms and head for the pay headquarters again, announcing on arrival that they have had reports of a fire. They begin searching the rooms.

Starting a small blaze, they then order the premises to be evacuated. With the building empty, they break into the safe and steal over £100,000. Starting several fires to cover their activities, they then withdraw, carrying a fake casualty in a stretcher. As troops rush in from across the base to put out the fire, the men drive off to a secluded spot on the base where they had left an army truck.

When an officer rings up the medics to check on the progress of the casualty, he is told nobody has arrived. Suspicious, he raises the alarm, and the whole camp is put on standby while the police are sent for. They are initially fooled into thinking the criminals have already left the camp. Meanwhile, the crooks successfully manage to escape from the camp by tailing onto the end of a convoy.

As the authorities slowly awaken to what has happened, military police are dispatched after the convoy. After the truck leaves the convoy, it is tracked down by the army, with the criminals seemingly cornered in a disused country barn. They try to make a break for it, using a flamethrower to clear their path. Initially successful, they manage to outrun the troops, before their truck explodes.

== Cast ==
- Stanley Baker as Turpin
- Helmut Schmid as Swavek
- Tom Bell as Fenner
- John Phillips as Colonel Fowler
- Patrick Magee as Regimental Sergeant Major Hicks
- John Westbrook as Captain Stafford
- Jack May as Medical Officer
- Frank Gatliff as Major Palmer
- Michael Ripper as Corporal Freeman
- John Rees as Sergeant Jones
- Tom Adams as Corporal Glenn
- Anthony Bate as Sergeant Reeves
- Rodney Bewes as Private Maynard
- Douglas Blackwell as Day
- Roddy McMillan as Sgt McVie
- Glynn Edwards as breakdown truck crewman
- Stephen Lewis as Military Police Corporal (cashier's office)
- Fulton Mackay as Corporal Henderson
- Stanley Meadows as Sergeant White
- Kenneth Mackintosh as Captain Nicholson
- Garfield Morgan as Military Policeman
- Geoffrey Palmer as Military Policeman
- Michael Robbins as Orford
- Peter Welch as W. O. Elsey

== Production ==
The film was one of several crime movies made in the late 1950s and early 1960s starring Stanley Baker.

== Reception ==
=== Box office ===
Despite a positive reception by critics, the film failed at the box office.

=== Critical ===
The Monthly Film Bulletin wrote: "Yet another military-operation-type thriller about a robbery. Natural locations have been used throughout, with excellent camerawork and lighting. The technical detail and the feeling of camp life are obviously authentic and always fascinating. The acting is fine, with a formidable array of small-part players bringing each and every character to individual fife. One or two clichés of suspense and dialogue fail to mar a generally well-constructed script which builds and sustains from an overlong opening. Cliff Owen's direction is crisp and assured. A very good film indeed of its formulary type."

Variety wrote: "Baker, Schmid and Bell play the three leads confidently, with Baker particularly on the ball in the type of harsh tough part that he plays so often and so well. But the thesping of the three stars is given greater impact by the strength of a long list of character and feature actors as officers, other ranks, detectives, etc. ... Camera and artwork are okay and Cliff Owen's direction punchy and sure. Holes could be picked in the screenplay and credulity is strained by the intricacies of the plot. But, overall, Prize adds up to a deft, commercial thriller."

In The Radio Times Guide to Films Tony Sloman gave the film 3/5 stars, writing: "This clever and exciting caper about the heist of army loot stars Stanley Baker, who was never quite as effective in leading roles as he was playing the supporting villain. Master cameraman and later cult director Nicolas Roeg co-wrote the original story while underrated Cliff Owen took on the directorial duties. The nail-biting climax is very well handled and there's a terrific co-starring performance from Tom Bell. Good reviews at the time didn't help this film's box office takings."

Leslie Halliwell wrote "Standard, pacy caper melodrama offering nothing at all new."

In Offbeat: British Cinema's Curiosities, Obscurities and Forgotten Items, Julian Upton wrote: "It's the filmmaking equivalent of a plate of bread and dripping and a mug of hot tea on a cold night on guard duty: it's satisfying, diverting and not un-tasty, but you won't need any fancy French words to describe it. ... A Prize of Arms thrives on pacing attention ...but there is also a striking visual flourish at the end."

== Home media ==
The film was released on Region One DVD in May 2007.
