= The Spessart Inn =

1958 film

Das Wirtshaus im Spessart The Spessart Inn
- Film poster showing Liselotte Pulver and Carlos Thompson.
- Directed by: Kurt Hoffmann
- Written by: Luiselotte Enderle; Curt Hanno Gutbrod; Heinz Pauck based on a novella by Wilhelm Hauff
- Produced by: Georg Witt
- Starring: Liselotte Pulver
- Cinematography: Richard Angst
- Edited by: Claus von Boro
- Music by: Franz Grothe
- Production company: Georg Witt-Film GmbH
- Distributed by: Constantin Film
- Release date: 15 January 1958
- Running time: 99 minutes
- Country: West Germany
- Language: German

The Spessart Inn (German: Das Wirtshaus im Spessart) is a 1958 West German musical comedy film directed by Kurt Hoffmann. It starred Liselotte Pulver and Carlos Thompson.

== Plot ==
In the late years of the 18th century, Felix and Peter, two journeymen, are travelling across the Spessart hills to Würzburg. Scared of the bandits that plague these parts, especially after a brief encounter with them, the two are glad to find an inn in the middle of the forest. However, it turns out that they have wandered into a den of thieves. The owners are in league with the bandits, who this very night plan to abduct Franziska, the Comtesse von Sandau, who is travelling through the forest with a group including her fiancé, Baron Sperling. Their coach is waylaid by a trap and the bandits direct them to the nearby inn. The waitress warns the journeymen of impending danger and they pass on the warning to the nobles. During the night, the brigands arrive. To escape, the Comtesse switches places with Felix and, in a man's clothes, escapes with Peter. Felix (as Comtesse), Franziska's maid and the pastor are taken to the bandits' lair. The bandits send Baron Sperling on his way to convey their ransom demand for 20,000 guilders to Graf Sandau, Franziska's father.

When Franziska arrives at her father's castle, he refuses to pay the ransom for the commoner who has taken his daughter's place. Instead, Graf Sandau decides to send the military against the bandits. Franziska thus rides to the bandits' lair and pretends to be a highwayman herself. The bandit leader accepts her as a henchman, but makes her sleep in his hut. In the morning he discovers her true identity but keeps this information from his men.

When Graf Sandau finds out that the Comtesse has gone to the bandits he sends Baron Sperling to the inn with the ransom money. The soldiers shadow him but the plan to follow the bandits back to their lair fails. Meanwhile, at the bandits' lair, their corporal finds out that the "Comtesse" they have imprisoned is a man. Franziska, on the pretense that she wants to find out the truth about the prisoner, switches back places with Felix, which saves his life but makes her a prisoner. The corporal wants to kill her and a confrontation ensues. The leader sides with the prisoners and during the fight, the parson escapes. The soldiers find the bandits' lair, but the leader snatches the Comtesse and rides off.

Franziska conceals the bandit leader in her father's castle. He reveals to her that he is in fact the son of an Italian Count from whom Graf Sandau borrowed money in the past, which he never repaid. After his father's death he came to Germany to recover his money from Graf Sandau, but before he could do so he was taken prisoner by the bandits. They forced him to join their band and eventually he became their leader. The planned abduction of the Comtesse was intended to make Graf Sandau finally pay the money he owed.

The soldiers search the castle and the bandit leader flees. However, he returns and elopes with Franziska who was about to marry Baron Sperling—a purely financial match set up by her father. The bandit leader/count takes Franziska in lieu of the money he is owed and they drive off in a wagon.

== Cast ==
- Liselotte Pulver as Comtesse Franziska von Sandau
- Carlos Thompson as Bandit Captain
- Günther Lüders as Baron Eberhard Sperling
- Rudolf Vogel as Parucchio
- Wolfgang Neuss as Knoll
- Wolfgang Müller as Funzel
- Ina Peters as Maid Barbara
- Kai Fischer as Bettina
- Veronika Fitz as Louise
- Herbert Hübner as Graf Sandau
- Hubert von Meyerinck as Obrist von Teckel
- Helmuth Lohner as Felix
- Hans Clarin as Peter
- Paul Esser as Bandit Corporal
- Otto Storr as Parson
- Karl Hanft as Jacob
- Heini Göbel as Coachman Gottlieb
- Ernst Brasch as Servant Anton
- Vera Complojer as Landlady
- Anette Karmann as Kitchen Maid Adele
- Georg Lehn as Stadtbote
- Ralf Wolter as Bandit

== Production ==
The script was based on an 1826 novella by Wilhelm Hauff and written by Heinz Pauck and Luiselotte Enderle. Curt Hanno Gutbrod also worked on the script. An earlier film version of Hauff's story had been released in 1923, directed by Adolf Wenter and starring Friedrich Berger and Ellen Kürty.

The film was shot at the Bavaria Studios in Munich with sets designed by the art directors Robert Herlth and Kurt Herlth. Schloss Mespelbrunn, actually located within the Spessart hills, was used as the castle of Graf Sandau. Another location was the market square of Miltenberg, a town between the Spessart and the Odenwald.

== Release ==
The Spessart Inn premiered on 15 January 1958 at the Gloria-Palast in Berlin.

The film was entered into the 1958 Cannes Film Festival and nominated for the Palme d'Or.

Kurt Hoffmann's The Haunted Castle and Glorious Times at the Spessart Inn were sequels of a sort to this film.

== Reception ==
The Filmbewertungsstelle awarded the film Prädikat: Wertvoll. It also received the Ernst-Lubitsch-Award in 1958. In 1960 it was awarded a "Bambi" for "Artistically Best Film of the Year" and in 1961 the Preis der deutschen Filmkritik for "Best Film".

Liselotte Pulver received the Filmband in Silber for "Best Actress" at the Deutscher Filmpreis in 1958 for her role as Franziska.

The Lexikon des internationalen Films calls the film "a colourful, delightfully spooky and cheerful film with a parodistic touch".

More recently, theatres in several towns in Germany, including Mespelbrunn, Fulda or Donauwörth have staged plays/musicals based on the film or at least including some of the elements added to Hauff's original story.
