= Moonwolf =

- US release film poster
- German: Zurück aus dem Weltall
- Directed by: Georges Friedland; Martin Nosseck
- Written by: Georges Friedland; Johannes Hendrich
- Based on: White Fang by Jack London
- Produced by: Wolfgang Brauner; T. J. Särkkä
- Starring: Carl Möhner; Anneli Sauli; Helmut Schmid
- Cinematography: Esko Töyri; Herbert Körner; Pentti Auer
- Edited by: Jutta Hering
- Music by: Peter Thomas
- Production companies: Alfa Film; Central Cinema Company Film; Suomen Filmiteollisuus
- Distributed by: Deutscher Filmring (Germany); Suomen Filmiteollisuus (Finland); Allied Artists Pictures (United States)
- Release dates: 6 May 1959 (West Germany); 16 January 1960 (Finland); 11 May 1966 (United States)
- Running time: 90 min
- Countries: West Germany; Finland
- Language: German

Moonwolf (German: Zurück aus dem Weltall; Finnish: Avaruusraketilla rakkauteen) is a 1959 West German-Finnish science fiction film directed by Georges Friedland and Martin Nosseck. The film is loosely based on the 1906 novel White Fang by Jack London.

== Plot ==
The Federal Republic of Germany decides to send a wolf dog named Wolff into space aboard a rocket, but there are problems with Wolff's feeding, so it is decided to bring the dog back to the earth's surface, resulting in the rocket carrying Wolff landing in Finnish Lapland. Dr. Holm (Carl Möhner) and Professor Robert (Richard Häussler) go to Finland to find out where the rocket landed. During the trip, Holm tells Robert about his previous research trip to Finland, when he met Ara (Anneli Sauli), the daughter of the owner of the weather station, and from where he initially brought Wolff with him to Germany.

== Cast ==
- Carl Möhner as Dr. Peter Holm
- Anneli Sauli as Ara
- Helmut Schmid as Johann
- Paul Dahlke as Ara's father
- Richard Häussler as Professor Robert
- Ingrid Lutz as Ilona
- Horst Gentzen as Prof. Robert's assistant
- Åke Lindman as a lumberjack

== Production ==
Most of the exterior shots of the film were shot in Finnish Lapland, and some of the interior shots were shot in the halls of Suomen Filmiteollisuus (SF) in Helsinki during April–May 1958. The rest of the interior shots were shot in the studios of CCC Film in West Berlin. According to cinematographer Esko Töyri, SF's share of the financing of the co-production film was about 80%, and Töyri's share of filming was about 70-75%.

== Release ==
In the United States, the English-dubbed version of the film was distributed by Allied Artists Pictures and released in 1966. On video, the film was distributed by Sinister Cinema.
