= The Head (1959 film) =

1959 horror film by Victor Trivas

- Directed by: Victor Trivas
- Screenplay by: Victor Trivas
- Produced by: Wolf C. Hartwig
- Starring: Horst Frank; Michel Simon; Dieter Eppler; Paul Dahlke; Karin Kernke
- Cinematography: Georg Krause
- Edited by: Friedel Buckow
- Music by: Willi Mattes
- Production company: Rapid-Film GmbH
- Release date: 24 July 1959
- Running time: 97 minutes
- Country: West Germany
- Language: German

The Head (German: Die Nackte und der Satan, lit. 'The Naked Woman and Satan') is a 1959 West German horror film written and directed by Victor Trivas, and produced by Wolf C. Hartwig. It starred Horst Frank, Dieter Eppler and Michel Simon.

The film was a low-budget production for Trivas and was among the first few horror films made in Germany following World War II along with Alraune (1952) and Horrors of Spider Island (1960). It was first released on July 24, 1959 and was one of the few German horror films released to the American film market in the 1960s. It was banned in Finland and received protests and police and government intervention on various early screenings in Austria.

The film received generally poor reviews from Austrian critics on its release in the country and some complimentary comments from English-language critics regarding its score and cinematography while reviews from various trade publications were generally lukewarm or negative.

== Plot ==
A scientist, Dr. Abel, is successful in creating a serum capable of keeping a dog's head alive after the body dies. Before the scientist can take advantage of his new discovery, he suffers a fatal heart attack. His assistant uses the formula to keep the scientist's severed head alive long enough to assist him in an attempt to transplant the head of the beautiful, but hunchbacked, nurse onto the body of an exotic dancer.

== Cast ==
Cast adapted from Filmportal.de and Der Spiegel.

- Horst Frank as Dr. Ood
- Michel Simon as Professor Abel
- Paul Dahlke as the detective
- Karin Kernke as Sister Irene
- Helmut Schmid as Laboratory assistant Bert
- Christiane Maybach as Dancer Lilly
- Dieter Eppler as Sculptor Paul
- Kurt Müller-Graf as Dr. Burke
- Maria Stadler as Frau Schneider
- Otto Storr as Bartender

== Production ==
The Head was one of the 15 films from producer Wolf C. Hartwig and Rapid-Film GmbH produced between 1957 and 1962. Academic Tim Bergfelder described Hartwig's productions as "difficult to define" with the only common denominator being gratuitous amounts of female nudity, often provided by Barbara Valentin. Hartwig's films from the late 1950s and early 1960s were described as exploitation films by Bergfelder, specifically as being films with minimal narrative, stereotypical characters, poor acting and plots involving themselves around brief film cycles of their respective periods. He said that his productions borrowed from earlier German genres but also Hollywood b-films and film serials.

Prior to 1962, Hartwig would produce films with the financial backing of a major distributor, leading him to take cost-cutting measures in terms of production values involving film sets, costumes and shooting schedules. All 15 films Rapid films produced between 1957 and 1962 were based on original scripts, which Bergfelder described as "clearly derivative" to avoid expensive copyright acquisitions. He often hired teams of inexperienced newcomers or exiles from Hollywood or for the case of The Head, veteran filmmakers from the Weimar Germany period such as cinematographer Georg Krause who had previously shot Stanley Kubrick's Paths of Glory in 1957. In her book Der "Kampf gegen Schmutz und Schund" (2014), academic Edith Blaschitz described the film as evoking early German horror films such as The Cabinet of Dr. Caligari (1920) through its use of shadow and light, which she said was not surprising as it had set design from Bruno Monden and Hermann Warm, the latter contributor who had also worked on Caligari. She continued that the combination of low budget and goal of maximum commercial success led to an unusual results with a film where characters defy all social conventions and containing a psychedelic and suspenseful soundtrack.

Hartwig had offered director Veit Harlan to direct The Head, which he turned down. The film was ultimately directed by Victor Trivas. Blaschitz wrote that the film was a low-budget production and was likely a economic necessity for director and screenwriter Victor Trivas than an artistic ambition. Kai Fischer was originally cast as the night club dancer Lilli in The Head. She raised objections on hearing the role involving her removing substantial portions of her clothes on screen. This led to her manager, Irmgard Palz, extracting an assurance from Hartwig on February 23 that the actress would appear neither nude nor topless in the film. Fischer left the production to be replaced with Christiane Maybach. Hartwig later said in a statement published in May 1959 that it was clear Fischer was not hired for her acting abilities.

== Release ==
The Head was first released on July 24, 1959. Along with Alraune (1952) and Horrors of Spider Island (1960), The Head was one of the first German post-World War II horror films. The Head was banned from theatrical release in Finland.

After screening in Austria in August 1959, it became what Blaschitz described as a key film in the attempted censorship of adult content in cinema in the country. The Österreichische Film und Kino Zeitung said that public protests against the film began in Salzburg, Austria. This led to a police investigation against a cinema owner who screened the film in November 1959, but the investigations were dropped shortly after. The Österreichische Film und Kino Zeitung later reported that the cinema owner with the film after its premiere which had the newspaper declare the event as "police censorship by covert means." A planned screening in Lienz was banned by the Tyrolean state government in 1960 based on the State Cinema Act, which prohibited screenings of films that would offend moral or religious sensibilities or had a "brutalizing" effect. The cinema owner filed lawsuit with the Constitutional Court which they ultimately won. The ban had been lifted in 1961 as it was found unconstitutional.

The film was released in the United States on October 11, 1961 with a 92 minute running time as The Head. It was later released on the East Coast in 1963 on a double bill with the British film The City of the Dead (1960). It was one of the few German horror film productions on the American market in the 1960s.

By 1986, Bill Warren wrote in his book Keep Watching the Skies! that the film had "seemingly vanished" on the English-language market, as it was not available for television screenings. It was released on Blu-ray in Germany in 2022.

== Reception ==
In the German-language magazine Film Revue, critic Wilhelm N. Weingarten summarized that everything in the film was so poor that it could not possibly get worse and that at the screening he attended, the audience was amused at the expense of the film. He concluded that felt sorry for actors Horst Frank and Michel Simon for having to lend their talents to the film. In Austria, critics in Austrian newspaper Arbeiter-Zeitung described it as a "pseudo-medical super-kitsch, exacerbated by boredom" while a Das Kleine Blatt reviewer called it a "thriller of the lowest quality." Blaschitz said that only Austrian critic that gave it a positive review was from Paimann's Filmlisten, where the review complimented the films direction, serious acting and summarizing it as an "arty thrill and sex-effects-based film."

From contemporary American reviews, Allen M. Widem of Motion Picture Herald found it good and that it "accomplishes its objectives with a flare [sic] that spells out dramatic dash of unprecedented lure." "Tube" in Variety said it was a "tedious and tasteless horror film," finding the direction "heavy, choppy and disjointed, but there are one or two passages endowed with a desirably eerie quality via the art music and photography department contributions." A reviewer in Film Daily called the film's music "unusual and effective." Lowell E. Redelings in the Hollywood Citizen News said that it was doubtful that audience will watch a foreign film that was "this tedious and monotonous" while finding the photography was not "half bad" and that the score "suggests the proper mood for a horror thriller - except this one doesn't thrill."

From retrospective reviews, Joe Dante wrote in Castle of Frankenstein magazine that the film was a "Grotesque German horror film" with an "uncomfortably strange atmosphere" and with "Terrible English dubbing."

== Legacy ==
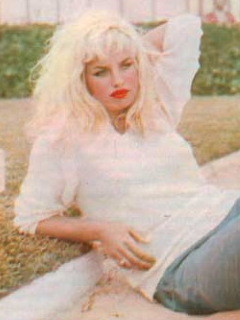
Barbara Valentin in 1959. Valentin had a small role in The Head and would appear in Hartwig's next film Horrors of Spider Island.

The German-language Film Revue magazine referred to The Head as an "unusually large success" for Hartwig and had the producer interested in producing another horror film. The producer would soon after develop the horror film Horrors of Spider Island (1960).

Barbara Valentin had a small role in The Head as a dancer. She said it was only her second role in a film, with her previously appearing a short film about road safety as a child and in the romance film Du gehörst mir (1959). She would work with Hartwig again on his production Horrors of Spider Island. Valentin's statuesque figure which was in vogue at the with popular actresses such as Marilyn Monroe and Brigitte Bardot. She continued in similar roles in the 1960s in films like In der Hölle ist noch Platz (1961), The Festival Girls (1962) and In Frankfurt sind die Nächte heiß (1966).

By the 1970s, she would become of the many reoccurring actors in the films of Rainer Werner Fassbinder.

== See also ==
- Horror films of Europe
- List of West German films of 1959
