= Georges Friedland =

- Born: 13 October 1910; Paris, France
- Died: 23 December 1993 (aged 83); Paris, France
- Occupations: Director, Editor, Writer
- Years active: 1931-1989 (film)

Georges Friedland (1910–1993) was a French screenwriter, film director and editor.

== Selected filmography ==
- Bourrasque (1935)
- The Brighton Twins (1936)
- In the Service of the Tsar (1936)
- Princess Tarakanova (1938)
- Gibraltar (1938)
- Murder with Music (1948)
- Nine Boys, One Heart (1948)
- The Smugglers' Banquet (1952)
- Moonwolf (1959)

== Bibliography ==
- Capua, Michelangelo. Anatole Litvak: The Life and Films. McFarland, 2015.
