= Ephraim Katz =

American journalist (1932–1992)

- Born: 11 March 1932; Tel Aviv, Mandatory Palestine
- Died: 2 August 1992 (aged 60); New York City, New York, United States
- Education: Hebrew University, New York University
- Occupations: Writer; journalist; filmmaker; film reporter and critic
- Known for: The Film Encyclopedia

Ephraim Katz (11 March 1932 – 2 August 1992) was a writer, journalist and filmmaker who devoted his life to gathering the information in his book, The Film Encyclopedia, first published in 1979.

== Biography ==
Katz, born in Tel Aviv, studied law and economics at the Hebrew University, Jerusalem. He later studied political science at Hunter College, New York and cinema at New York University.

Ephraim was a film reporter and critic in Israel, before moving to the United States in 1959. Residing in New York City, he made television documentaries for CBS, including The Taste of Sunday, one of its first in color, and later for NBC. Katz, Quentin Reynolds, and Zwy Aldouby co-wrote the book Minister of Death: The Adolf Eichmann Story (1960), about Israel's capture of Eichmann.

Ephraim Katz directed many documentaries, educational and industrial films, but his greatest contribution to cinema was his single-volume work, The Film Encyclopedia (1st hardcover edition, 1979). One of the most comprehensive critical and historical works on film in print, he single-handedly wrote the entire first edition. The Encyclopedia contains biographical and critical information about many major and minor figures in films including actors, directors, producers, and production people. It also chronicles the history of cinema around the world and contains definitions and descriptions of technical processes and film terminology. A softcover version of the first edition was released by Harper & Row in 1990.

Katz and his wife Helen had two daughters, Alyssa and Laura. He died in New York City of emphysema on August 2, 1992.

At the time of his death, Katz was in the process of updating The Film Encyclopedia. The second edition was eventually completed by two colleagues, Fred Klein and Ronald Dean Nolen, and released in 1994. Klein and Nolen continued to revise and update Katz's work as needed, with a 3rd edition released in 1998; a 4th edition in 2001, and a 5th edition in 2005. Nolen alone revised and issued a 6th edition of Katz's work, published in 2008. A 7th edition (ISBN 0062026151) was released in 2012.
