= Gottfried Reinhardt =

Austrian-American film director

- Born: 20 March 1913; Berlin, German Empire
- Died: 19 July 1994 (aged 81); Los Angeles, California, US
- Occupation: Film director
- Years active: 1952 – 1965

Gottfried Reinhardt (20 March 1913 – 19 July 1994) was an Austrian-born American film director and producer.

== Biography ==
Reinhardt was born in Berlin, the son of the Austrian theater director Max Reinhardt (until 1904: Max Goldmann), manager of the Deutsches Theater, and his first wife Else Heims. Gottfried attended the Französisches Gymnasium Berlin and began his career as an actor and director at his father's theater.

In 1932, he went on a study visit to the US, where he remained after the Nazi Machtergreifung in Germany on 30 January 1933. In Hollywood, he became assistant director of Ernst Lubitsch, and later a production assistant at the Metro-Goldwyn-Mayer studios, contributing to the making of the 1938 film The Great Waltz. In 1941, he produced Two-Faced Woman, starring Greta Garbo in her final film role. A naturalized American, he served in the United States Army in World War II.

Reinhardt made his debut as a director with Invitation in 1952. Two years later, he worked in West Germany and Before Sundown, his film version of Gerhart Hauptmann's drama Vor Sonnenuntergang, starring Hans Albers, won the Golden Bear (Audience award) at the 6th Berlin International Film Festival.

Gottfried Reinhardt was the stepfather of U.S. federal judge Stephen Reinhardt. He died of pancreatic cancer.

== Selected filmography ==
- The Great Waltz (1938, writer)
- Bridal Suite (1939, writer)
- Two-Faced Woman (1941, producer)
- Rage in Heaven (1941, producer)
- The Red Badge of Courage (1951, producer)
- Invitation (1952)
- Young Man with Ideas (1952, producer)
- The Story of Three Loves (1953)
- Betrayed (1954)
- Before Sundown (1956)
- Menschen im Hotel (1959)
- Abschied von den Wolken (1959)
- Sweetheart of the Gods (1960)
- Town Without Pity (1961)
- Jedermann (1961)
- Eleven Years and One Day (1963)
- Situation Hopeless ... But Not Serious (1965)
- Der Kommissar: Im Jagdhaus (1974, TV series episode)
