= Walther Reyer =

Austrian actor (1922–1999)

- Born: 4 September 1922; Tyrol, Austria
- Died: 5 September 1999 (aged 77); Innsbruck, Austria
- Occupation: Actor
- Years active: 1954–1997

Walther Reyer (4 September 1922 – 5 September 1999) was an Austrian actor. He appeared in more than 50 films and television shows between 1954 and 1997.

== Filmography ==
| Year | Title | Role | Notes |
|---|---|---|---|
| 1954 | The Red Prince | | |
| 1954 | The Sinful Village | Sepp Stangassinger | |
| 1956 | Crown Prince Rudolph's Last Love | Erzherzog Johann Salvator | |
| 1957 | Sissi – The Young Empress | Count Graf Andrassy | |
| 1957 | Sissi – Fateful Years of an Empress | Count Graf Andrassy | |
| 1958 | The Doctor of Stalingrad | Dr. Sellnow | |
| 1958 | Hoch klingt der Radetzkymarsch | Stephan Fischbacher, Oberleutnant im Regiment 'Prinz Eugen' | |
| 1959 | The Tiger of Eschnapur | Maharadjaj Chandra | |
| 1959 | The Indian Tomb | Maharadjaj Chandra | |
| 1959 | Maria Stuart | | |
| 1959 | Jacqueline | Paul Büttner | |
| 1960 | Don Carlos | Don Carlos | |
| 1960 | Gustav Adolf's Page | Hauptmann Roland | |
| 1961 | Jedermann | Jedermann | |
| 1962 | The Eye of Evil | Andreas Hartman | |
| 1962 | Romance in Venice | Stefan | |
| 1963 | Ferien vom Ich | Frank A. Stevenson | |
| 1964 | The Spendthrift | Julius von Flottwell | |
| 1981 | The Amateur | Chancellor | |
| 1984 | Woman Doctors | Dr. Riemenschild | |
| 1997 | Die Schuld der Liebe | Prälat Sippel | |
