= Glorious Times at the Spessart Inn =

1967 film

- Liselotte Pulver and Hannelore Elsner
- Directed by: Kurt Hoffmann
- Written by: Günter Neumann
- Produced by: Kurt Hoffmann; Heinz Angermeyer; Artur Brauner
- Starring: Liselotte Pulver; Harald Leipnitz; Vivi Bach
- Cinematography: Richard Angst
- Edited by: Gisela Haller
- Music by: Franz Grothe
- Production company: CCC Film
- Distributed by: Constantin Film
- Release date: 21 September 1967
- Running time: 105 minutes
- Country: West Germany
- Language: German

Glorious Times at the Spessart Inn (German: Herrliche Zeiten im Spessart) is a 1967 West German comedy film directed by Kurt Hoffmann and starring Liselotte Pulver, Harald Leipnitz, and Vivi Bach.

It is the last in a trilogy of films spawned by The Spessart Inn in 1958. The plot this time revolves around time travelling.

The film's sets were designed by the art directors Isabella and Werner Schlichting. It was shot at the Spandau Studios in Berlin and on location in Bavaria, Hesse and Vienna.

== Plot ==
Anneliese, a descendant of Countess Franziska and Countess Charlotte, is the daughter of a hotel owner in the Spessart mountains. The young woman is currently planning her wedding with her fiancé Frank, an American officer of German origin, when he is surprisingly ordered back to the USA in the middle of the wedding preparations because of an espionage matter. The celebration threatens to collapse.

The robbers of Spessart inn, who have mutated into ghosts and have been traveling in space in a landing capsule for over five years because a nozzle is jammed, find out that they can repair it. They then end up on the roof of the Spessart, where they meet Anneliese. They are helpful and want to fly the young woman with the landing capsule to her fiancé in America. However, they cannot operate the controls properly and are thrown through time, meaning they go through different eras of the past and the future. First they end up in the past with the Germanic peoples, the minstrels and also in the Thirty Years' War. In each of these times Anni meets the type of her fiancé, but each time she loses him to the military.

Later in the future, when the traveling companions are looking for a rocket technician to help with the jammed nozzle, they meet the couple Anni and Frank, who have now aged many years and who, against all odds, were able to carry out their planned wedding and now have three sons. During a test trip in the space capsule, time turns back again, Frank, who is traveling with him, gets younger and younger until, after a short detour through childhood, he lands on time. Frank's memories have also run back, so that he can no longer remember his long life after the wedding: This is what he says dryly when Anni, whose memory endures, happily tells him about their three sons, that she is a nice girl, but unfortunately a bit crazy. But the ghosts have accomplished the good work required of them and are now redeemed.

== Cast ==
- Liselotte Pulver as Anneliese
- Harald Leipnitz as Frank Green
- Vivi Bach as Rosalinde
- Hannelore Elsner as Johanna
- Tatjana Sais as Frau Mümmelmann
- Joachim Teege as Hugo
- Rudolf Rhomberg as Onkel Max
- Hans Richter as Toni
- Kathrin Ackermann as Katrin
- Klaus Schwarzkopf as Roland
- Peter Capell as Bürgermeister
- Paul Esser as Mönch
- Sibille Gilles
- Ewald Wenck
- Erich Fiedler
- Willy Millowitsch as Konsul Mümmelmann
- Hubert von Meyerinck as General Teckel
- Gila von Weitershausen as Gundel
- Monika Zinnenberg as Sigrun

== Bibliography ==
- Bock, Hans-Michael; Bergfelder, Tim, eds. (2009). The Concise Cinegraph: Encyclopaedia of German Cinema. New York: Berghahn Books. ISBN 978-1-57181-655-9.
- Sherman, Fraser A. (2017). Now and Then We Time Travel: Visiting Pasts and Futures in Film and Television. Jefferson, NC: McFarland. ISBN 978-1-4766-2643-7.
