= Sinus-Milieus =

German social-segmentation model

The Sinus-Milieus are a model of social stratification and lifestyle-based target-group segmentation developed and marketed by the Heidelberg-based Sinus-Institut. The model places a population in a two-dimensional space along social position (vertical) and basic value orientation (horizontal), then clusters people of similar values and ways of life into "milieus". The approach was first published in 1981. It is used today in market and media research, brand and product development, political campaigning, public-policy planning and academic sociology in Germany, Austria and Switzerland, with adapted Sinus Meta-Milieus versions for more than 40 other countries.

The German model currently contains ten milieus. Its standard visualisation, coloured ovals overlapping on the social-position-by-values plane, is widely known in German as the Kartoffelgrafik ("potato graph") after a 2009 feature in Stern.

The Sinus-Milieus have shaped German empirical social science, especially the milieu-based work of Stefan Hradil, Gerhard Schulze and Michael Vester, and they are built into the main German-language market-media studies and audience-measurement panels. They have also drawn academic criticism on grounds of proprietary methodology, opacity and a focus on subjective lifestyle indicators at the expense of structural inequality.

== History ==
=== Origins ===
The Sinus-Institut was founded in Heidelberg in 1978 as a market- and social-research consultancy. Its milieu approach was developed in the late 1970s as an alternative to the then-dominant German socio-demographic and class-based Schicht (stratum) categories. The first public statement of the approach, "The Everyday Life Approach as a New Perspective in Opinion and Market Research" by Horst Nowak and Dorothea Becker, won the Best Paper award at the ESOMAR congress in Vienna in 1981.

Through the 1980s the model was picked up by major German consumer-goods brands and advertising agencies. It was published commercially as the Sinus-Milieus and registered as a protected trademark. From the late 1980s it was built into the main German market-media studies and into the television and consumer panels, and was increasingly cited in German-language academic sociology.

=== Versions ===
The Sinus-Institut updates its national models periodically to reflect structural and cultural change. The original 1980s model described a Cold War-era West German class society. After reunification the model was redrawn for the country as a whole. A 2.0 model appeared in the early 2000s, and the current Sinus-Milieus 3.0 system was introduced in 2010 and has been adjusted at intervals of roughly two years since. Parallel models for Austria and Switzerland are maintained jointly with the Vienna-based INTEGRAL Markt- und Meinungsforschung and a Sinus partner in Zürich.

== Methodology ==
The Sinus model is built from recurring large-sample mixed-methods studies. Respondents take part in qualitative depth interviews and complete standardised questionnaires covering values, attitudes to work, family, leisure, consumption and the media, and socio-demographic characteristics. The resulting clusters are placed on a two-dimensional plane:

- the vertical axis records social position (lower, middle, upper), measured by income, education and occupation
- the horizontal axis records basic value orientation, divided into three bands: tradition, modernisation/individualisation and reorientation (the most recent values, including post-material, expressive and digital orientations)

Milieus are then drawn as overlapping ovals. The overlap is itself a claim: it says that the borders between milieus are blurred. Socio-demographic variables are used to describe milieus rather than to define them, an explicit reversal of the 1970s German class-based segmentation.

== German model ==
The current Sinus-Milieus model for Germany (status 2025) contains ten milieus in four broader families: leading milieus (Leitmilieus), future milieus (Zukunftsmilieus), modern mainstream, and traditional mainstream.

Sinus-Milieus, Germany (2025)
Group	Milieu	Brief description	Population share
Leading milieus	Conservative-Established	Established, responsibility-oriented core of the upper middle. Defenders of bourgeois values	11%
Leading milieus	Post-Materialist	Engaged, well-educated milieu, critical of growth-oriented capitalism, oriented to social and ecological justice	12%
Leading milieus	Performers	Efficiency-driven, achievement-oriented optimists of the globalised economy	10%
Future milieus	Expeditive	Ambitious, creative cosmopolitans, future-optimistic and experiment-prone	10%
Future milieus	Neo-Ecological	Pragmatic progressives committed to social and ecological transformation	8%
Modern mainstream	Adaptive-Pragmatic Centre	Flexible, utility-oriented modern centre. Values security and belonging	12%
Modern mainstream	Consumer-Hedonist	Experience- and pleasure-oriented, oscillates between conformity and rebellion	8%
Modern mainstream	Precarious	Working population that feels left behind. Strong desire for recognition and belonging	9%
Traditional mainstream	Nostalgic-Bourgeois	Stability-seeking middle, anxious about social change and downward mobility	11%
Traditional mainstream	Traditional	Older generation rooted in a petit-bourgeois or traditional working-class outlook	9%

== Variants ==
Several specialised models extend the basic framework:

- Sinus Meta-Milieus aggregate national milieu structures into a cross-national framework used in over 40 countries, including emerging markets.
- Sinus Migrant-Milieus (Sinus-Migrantenmilieus) describe the milieu structure of the population of migrant background in Germany. The first study was published in 2008 in cooperation with the Federal Agency for Civic Education.
- Sinus Youth-Milieus (Sinus-Jugendmilieus) segment under-18s. Results appear in the recurring Wie ticken Jugendliche? studies (2008, 2012, 2016, 2020 and 2024), commissioned in part by the Federal Agency for Civic Education.
- Digital Sinus-Milieus classify Internet users by milieu for online targeting.
- Micro-geographic Sinus-Milieus map milieus to small geographic units for direct marketing and urban planning.

== Applications ==
=== Market and media research ===
The Sinus-Milieus have been built into the main German-language market-media studies since the late 1980s, and into the audience-measurement panels of the public broadcasters ARD and ZDF and of major commercial broadcasters in Germany, Austria and Switzerland. The trade publication media & marketing listed the model as one of the most important target-group approaches in Germany in 2007.

=== Political research ===
The Bertelsmann Stiftung has used the Sinus-Milieus to analyse voter mobilisation in German federal elections. Its 2017 study Populäre Wahlen broke down mobilisation and counter-mobilisation across milieus in that year's Bundestag election. Sinus-Institut also publishes its own milieu-by-milieu vote breakdowns after each federal election. Following the 2025 federal election, the institute reported that CDU/CSU led in seven of the ten milieus.

=== Other fields ===
Sinus has published specialised milieu handbooks for religious-affiliation research with the Catholic Media-Dienstleistungs-Gesellschaft (the recurring MDG-Milieuhandbuch), for civic education through the Federal Agency for Civic Education, and for urban planning through the micro-geographic variant.

== Reception and influence on sociology ==
Rainer Diaz-Bone, writing in Sozialwissenschaften und Berufspraxis, has described a "reciprocal influence" between the Sinus-Milieus and German empirical sociology, especially the milieu-based work of Stefan Hradil, Gerhard Schulze and Michael Vester. Schulze's 1992 Die Erlebnisgesellschaft ("The Experience Society") drew on Sinus data in mapping value-based "everyday-aesthetic" milieus. Michael Vester's Hannover research group developed an alternative Bourdieusian milieu typology in dialogue with the Sinus material.

== Criticism ==
Academic critics have raised three lines of objection to the Sinus-Milieus.

The first is methodological transparency. The criteria used to assign respondents to milieus are not fully disclosed by Sinus-Institut, and the Tübingen researcher Wolfgang Ilg has argued that this lack of transparency makes the results difficult to reproduce or to evaluate against standard scientific norms.

The second is the suspicion that the model is a marketing instrument with a sociological surface. In a 2009 Telepolis analysis, the journalist Jan Pehrke argued that the milieu logic contains an element of circular reasoning (lifestyles defined by attitudes, attitudes explained by lifestyles), and that as economic conditions worsened in the late 2000s, classical class indicators such as income and employment status reasserted their explanatory weight.

The third is theoretical. Bourdieusian sociologists in the Hannover group around Michael Vester have reconstructed German social space using division of labour and patterns of domination instead of values, on the argument that the Sinus axes obscure relations of class. In a peer-reviewed critique of the Sinus Migrant-Milieus in German Politics and Society, Esra Erdem argued that the migrant-milieus framework essentialises ethnicity and culture as a category of analysis and reproduces a methodological-nationalist framing of belonging.

== See also ==
- Social stratification
- Lifestyle (sociology)
- Habitus (sociology)
- Market segmentation
- VALS
- Pierre Bourdieu
