= Michel Le Royer =

French actor (1932–2022)

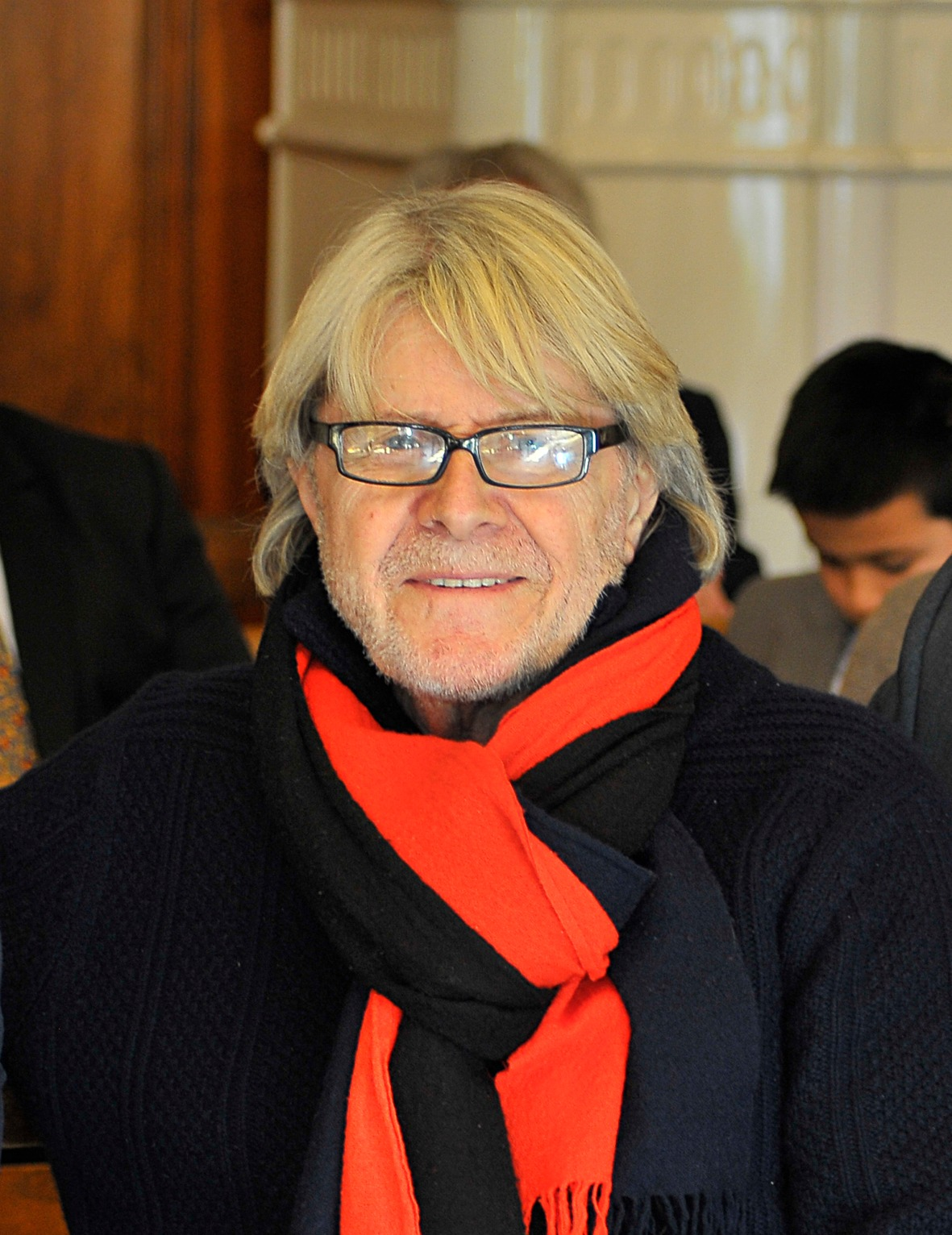
- Michel Le Royer Lausanne in 2014
- Born: 31 August 1932; Carrouges, France
- Died: 25 February 2022 (aged 89); Paris, France
- Occupation: Actor
- Years active: 1952–2018

Michel Le Royer (31 August 1932 – 25 February 2022) was a French actor, known for his roles in La Fayette, Nutty, Naughty Chateau, and Her Harem. He died on 25 February 2022, at the age of 89.

== Selected filmography ==
- Good Lord Without Confession (1953)
