= Helmut Schmid =

German actor (1925–1992)

- Born: 8 April 1925; Neu-Ulm, Germany
- Died: 18 July 1992 (aged 67); Heiligenschwendi, Switzerland
- Occupation: Film actor
- Years active: 1954–1983

Helmut Schmid (1925–1992) was a German actor. He was the husband of actress Liselotte Pulver from 1961 until his death.

== Filmography ==
Year	Title	Role	Notes
1954	Dear Miss Doctor	Dr. Hans Klinger	
1956	Das Erbe vom Pruggerhof	Florian Türck, Architekt	
1956	Heiße Ernte	Stanislaus Sadowski	
1957	The King of Bernina	Seni	
1957	All Roads Lead Home	Autohändler Busch	
1958	Escape from Sahara	Pat Kilby	
1958	Bimbo the Great	Kovacs	
1958	Liebe kann wie Gift sein	Robert Ferber	
1958	Man in the River	Manfred Thelen	
1958	Schwarze Nylons – Heiße Nächte	Heinz Woehler	
1959	Your Body Belongs to Me	Dieter	
1959	Moonwolf	Johann	
1959	Lockvogel der Nacht	Heinz Zimmermann	
1959	The Head	Bert Jaeger	
1959	The Death Ship	Martin, Heizer auf der Yorikke	
1959	Melodie und Rhythmus	Himself	Uncredited
1960	Frauen in Teufels Hand	Major Berg	
1960	Under Ten Flags		
1960	Headquarters State Secret	Rudi Castrop	
1960	Gustav Adolf's Page	Herzog von Lauenburg	
1961	Daniella by Night	Karl Bauer	
1961	… denn das Weib ist schwach	Jolly Gebhardt	
1961	One, Two, Three	East German Policeman	Uncredited
1962	The Bashful Elephant	Kurt	
1962	Journey Into Nowhere	Joe	
1962	Das Testament des Dr. Mabuse	Jonny Briggs	
1962	A Prize of Arms	Swavek	
1962	Kohlhiesel's Daughters	Toni	
1964	Der Satan mit den roten Haaren		
1965	The House in Karp Lane	Leutnant Slezak	
1965	Man Called Gringo	Ken Denton	
1965	Five Thousand Dollars on One Ace	Jimmy el Negro	
1968	Commandos	Sgt. Miller	
1972	The Salzburg Connection	Grell	
