= Karl Costa =

Austrian public official, writer, and librettist (1832–1907)

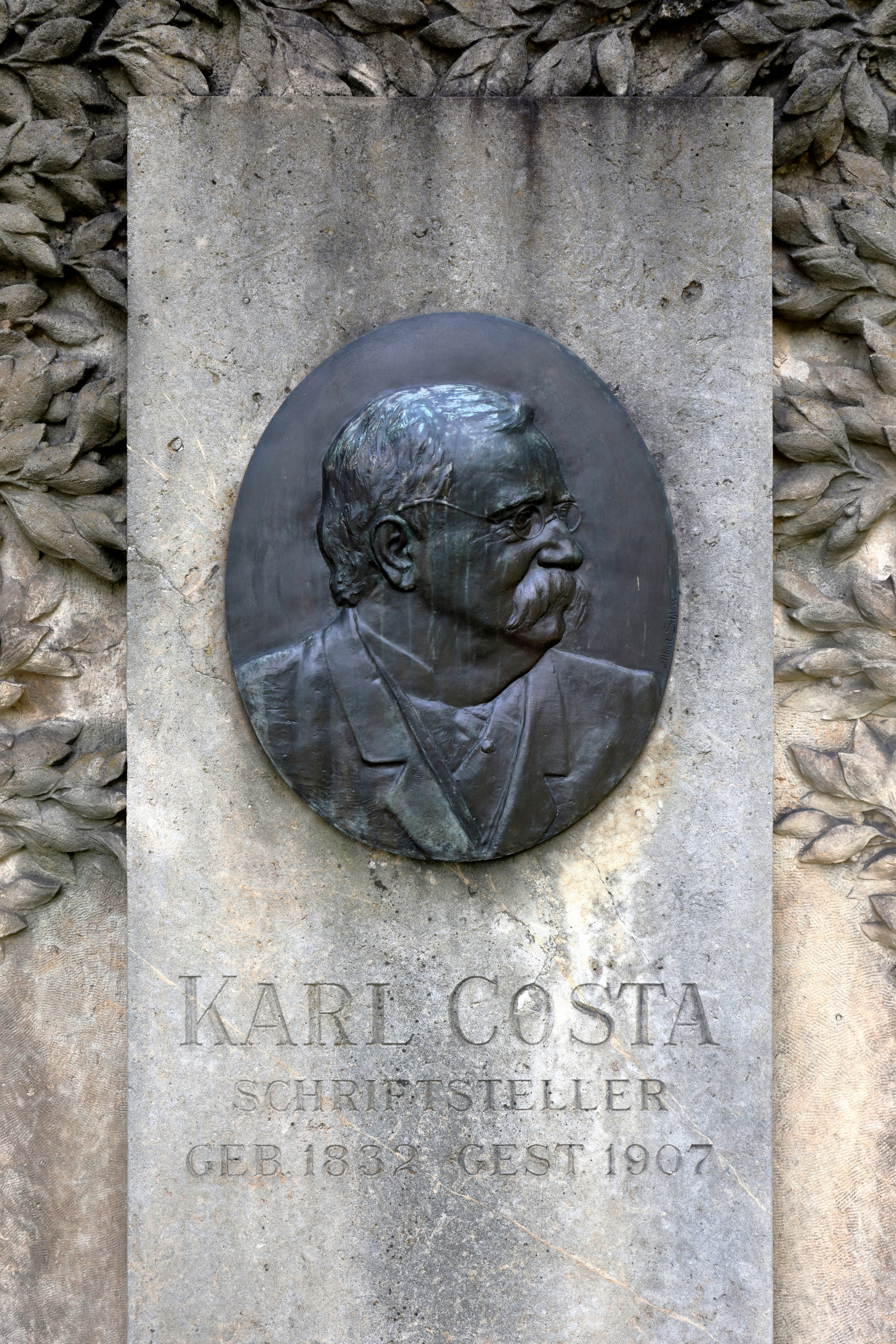
Gravestone

Karl Costa (2 February 1832 — 11 October 1907) was an Austrian public official, writer and librettist. He is known as a folk poet and for his librettos. He was photographed by Rudolf Krziwanek (1843—1905). His work was part of several Carl Millöcker operettas.

He was born in Vienna. His second marriage was to Rosa Goldstern (1862–1916). She was Jewish. Felix Costa was their son.

Costa died in Vienna.

== Works ==
- Leichte Kavallerie,
- The Lightning Girl, Ein Blitzmädel, (1877) wrote the libretto
- Ein Kassastück (1877)
- Ihr Korporal (1878)
- Himmelschlüssel (1878)
- Der Mann im Monde (1882)
