= Wolfgang Preiss =

German actor (1910–2002)

- Born: 27 February 1910; Nuremberg, Bavaria, Germany
- Died: 27 November 2002 (aged 92); Bühl, Baden-Württemberg, Germany
- Resting place: Baden-Baden
- Years active: 1932–1996
- Spouse: Ruth Preiss (1955–2002) (her death)

Wolfgang Preiss (27 February 1910 – 27 November 2002) was a German theatre, film and television actor.

== Biography ==
The son of a teacher, Preiss studied philosophy, German, and drama in the early 1930s. He also took private acting classes with Hans Schlenck, making his stage début in Munich in 1932. He appeared in various theatre productions in Heidelberg, Königsberg, Bonn, Bremen, Stuttgart and Berlin.

In 1942, he made his film début – he was specifically exempted from military service – in the Universum Film AG production Die große Liebe with Zarah Leander. After the end of the Second World War, Preiss returned to the theatre, and from 1949 worked extensively dubbing films into German.

In 1954, he returned to film acting, appearing in Alfred Weidenmann's Canaris. The following year, Preiss played the lead role of Claus von Stauffenberg in Falk Harnack's film The Plot to Assassinate Hitler, which dramatised the 20 July plot. This role brought Preiss to popular attention and also the 1956 Federal Film Award.

From then on, Preiss was largely typecast in the role of the upright and conscientious German officer against the other actor playing the fanatic (i.e. Paul Scofield in The Train), a part he played in many films, later reprising it in numerous international productions, predominantly in Italy and the USA, while occasionally playing a more typically cynical or brutal Nazi officer.

Preiss appeared in such productions as The Longest Day (1962), Otto Preminger's The Cardinal (1963), and with Jean-Paul Belmondo in Is Paris Burning? (1966). He starred alongside Burt Lancaster in John Frankenheimer's The Train (1964), Frank Sinatra in Von Ryan's Express (1965), Robert Mitchum in Anzio (1968), with Richard Burton, in the title role of Erwin Rommel in Raid on Rommel (1971), and The Boys From Brazil (1978) with Gregory Peck. Preiss played Field Marshal von Rundstedt in Richard Attenborough's all-star war epic A Bridge Too Far (1977). From 1968–1988 he played in American film and television productions five different German field marshals, having already played a fictional Afrika Korps general in an episode of The Rat Patrol (1966).

In addition, for the cinema-going public of West Germany, he became the epitome of the evil genius in his role as Doctor Mabuse, a role he first played in 1960 (following Rudolf Klein-Rogge) in Fritz Lang's The Thousand Eyes of Dr. Mabuse. He went on to play the role four more times.

In the 1980s, Preiss turned to television, notably playing General Walther von Brauchitsch in the American TV miniseries Winds of War and War and Remembrance, based on the books of Herman Wouk.

In 1987, Preiss received a second Federal Film Award for his outstanding work in film.

In film dubbing, Preiss provided the voice for such actors as Lex Barker, Christopher Lee, Anthony Quinn, Claude Rains, Richard Widmark and Conrad Veidt as "Major Strasser" in the 1975 remastered version of Casablanca.

== Selected filmography ==
- The Great Love (1942) as Oberleutnant Von Etzdorf
- The Crew of the Dora (1943) as Staffelarzt Dr. Wagner
- Der Fall 7 A 9 (Falschmünzer am Werk) (1951)
- Canaris (1954) as Col. Holl
- Doctor Solm (1955) as Dr. Hartung
- The Plot to Assassinate Hitler (1955) as Oberst Claus Schenk Graf von Stauffenberg
- The Cornet (1955) as Freiherr von Pirovano
- Before Sundown (1956) as Dr. Hahnefeld, Syndikus der Clausen-Werke
- Like Once Lili Marleen (1956) as Alfred Linder
- The Story of Anastasia (1956)
- Johannisnacht (1956) as Mac Fadden
- Von der Liebe besiegt (1957) as Mario Clar, Konstrukteur
- Stresemann (1957) as Heinz Becker
- Haie und kleine Fische (1957) as U-Bootkommandant Lüttke
- I Was All His (1958) as Dr. Leipold
- The Italians They Are Crazy (1958) as Hans
- The Green Devils of Monte Cassino (1958) as Munkler
- Grabenplatz 17 (1958) as Kriminalkommissar Dr. Jäger
- The Girl with the Cat's Eyes (1958) as Carlo Gormann
- Prisoner of the Volga (1959) as General Gorew
- Stalingrad: Dogs, Do You Want to Live Forever? (1959) as Major Linkmann
- La Valse du Gorille (1959) as Otto Lohn
- Arzt ohne Gewissen (1959) as Dr. Westorp
- Roses for the Prosecutor (1959) as Prosecutor General
- Darkness Fell on Gotenhafen (1960) as Dr. Beck
- Mistress of the World (1960) as Brandes
- The Thousand Eyes of Dr. Mabuse (1960) as Prof. Dr. S. Jordan / Peter Cornelius / Dr. Mabuse
- Mill of the Stone Women (1960) as Dr. Loren Bohlem
- Geständnis einer Sechzehnjährigen (1961) as Günther Brandt
- La Fayette (1961) as Baron Kalb
- The Return of Doctor Mabuse (1961) as Dr. Mabuse
- Riviera Story (1961) as Arthur Dahlberg
- Das Mädchen und der Staatsanwalt (1962) as Prosecutor Soldan
- The Invisible Dr. Mabuse (1962) as Dr. Primarius Krone / Dr. Mabuse
- The Counterfeit Traitor (1962) as Colonel Nordoff
- Das Testament des Dr. Mabuse (1962) as Dr. Mabuse
- The Longest Day (1962) as Maj. Gen. Max Pemsel
- The Black Cobra (1963) as Stanislas Raskin
- Scotland Yard Hunts Dr. Mabuse (1963) as Dr. Mabuse's Ghost
- The Hangman of London (1963) as Inspector Morel Smith
- The Cardinal (1963) as S.S. Major
- The Secret of Dr. Mabuse (1964) as Dr. Mabuse (archive footage)
- Cave of the Living Dead (1964) as Prof. von Adelsberg
- Frühstück mit dem Tod (1964) as Prosecutor Ted Talbot
- Backfire (1964) as Grenner
- The Train (1964) as Major Herren
- 100 Horsemen (1964) as Sheik abengalbon
- Von Ryan's Express (1965) as Major Von Klemment
- Code Name: Jaguar (1965) as Captain Parker
- To Skin a Spy (1966) as Chalieff
- Is Paris Burning? (1966) as Capitaine Ebernach
- Jungfrau aus zweiter Hand (1967) as Leiter der Mordkommission
- Spy Today, Die Tomorrow (1967) as Sebastian (BND Chief)
- Dead Run (1967) as Inspector Noland
- Death on a Rainy Day (1967) as Dr. Angus Cromwell
- Jack of Diamonds (1967) as Von Schenk
- Tamara (1968) as Vater Bricks
- Anzio (1968) as Field Marshal Albert Kesselring
- Hannibal Brooks (1969) as Col. von Haller
- Battle of the Commandos (1969) as Col. Ackerman
- Playgirl 70 (1969)
- Raid on Rommel (1971) as Erwin Rommel
- The Fifth Cord (1971) as Police Inspector
- Una farfalla con le ali insanguinate (1971) as Prosecutor
- The Salzburg Connection (1972) as Felix Zauner
- A Man to Respect (1972) as Miller (credited as Wolfgang Miller Preiss)
- The Big Delirium (1975) as Artmann
- Die Dubarry (1975) as Graf Dubarry
- The Standard (1977) as Oberst
- A Bridge Too Far (1977) as Field Marshal Gerd von Rundstedt
- The Boys from Brazil (1978) as Lofquist
- Die Anstalt (1978) as Dr. Reinecke
- Bloodline (1979) as Julius Prager
- The Formula (1980) as Franz Tauber, Swiss businessman
- Fantasma d'amore (1981) as Conte Zighi
- Forget Mozart (1985) as Baron Gottfried van Swieten
- The Summer of the Samurai (1986) (scenes deleted)
- The Second Victory (1987) as Father Albertus
- Land der Väter, Land der Söhne (1988) as Bernauer (old)
- Dr. M (1990) as Kessler
- Aire Libre (1996) as Alexander von Humboldt (old) (final film role)

== Selected television appearances ==
- The Rat Patrol (1966) as Gen. Ernest von Helmreich
- Ein Mann namens Harry Brent (1968, TV miniseries) as George Conway
- Wallenstein (1978) as Thurn
- Ike (1979) as Field Marshal Alfred Jodl
- The Winds of War (1983) as Field Marshal von Brauchitsch
- Albert Schweitzer (1987) as Albert Schweitzer (90 years old)
- War and Remembrance (1988) as Field Marshal Walther von Brauchitsch
