= Arabella (novel) =

1949 novel by Georgette Heyer

- First edition
- Author: Georgette Heyer
- Cover artist: Philip Gough
- Language: English
- Genre: Regency, Romance
- Publisher: William Heinemann
- Publication date: 1949
- Publication place: United Kingdom
- Media type: Print (Hardback & Paperback)
- Pages: 288 pp

Arabella is a Regency romance novel written by Georgette Heyer. It records the plight of a relatively poor girl from the English gentry who captures the attention of a very wealthy man by claiming to be an heiress; although he disbelieves her, he is amused by her presumption and character. The story is set in the spring of 1817.

== Plot summary ==
Arabella, the beautiful daughter of a country vicar, sets out to London to have a season and make an advantageous marriage. On her way there, her carriage has an accident and she has to stop over at the hunting box of Robert Beaumaris, the Nonpareil of the town and one of the wealthiest men in England.

Mr Beaumaris suspects the 'accident' to be a ruse on the part of someone chasing him for his fortune. Overhearing him make a remark to this effect, Arabella impulsively pretends to be an heiress. Mr. Beaumaris, knowing this to be untrue is amused by her daring to put him in his place, and decides to encourage his friend's belief in this falsehood. He is bored with Society and views the town cynically. He is also amused by the fact that society will follow whoever leads, irrespective of the wisdom of the person's behaviour.

Arabella requests that Mr Beaumaris and his friend Lord Fleetwood not reveal her "fortune". She continues on her journey to London to stay with her godmother, Lady Bridlington, blithely believing that nothing will come of this interlude. However, Lord Fleetwood is not very discreet, and the town soon believes Arabella to be an heiress. To amuse himself, Mr Beaumaris decides to make Arabella the rage of the town by flirting with her and driving her out in his carriage. Arabella is aware that his intentions are not serious, but plays along because to be admired by him makes her a social success.

Arabella feels that she cannot make a good match when all the town mistakenly believe her to be wealthy. Knowing that Mr Beaumaris can have no designs on her supposed fortune and is only amusing himself with her, she is most comfortable in his company. She enchants him with her unusual behaviour (which includes foisting a climbing boy and a mongrel on him) and the fact that she does not appear to fancy him.

Mr Beaumaris eventually falls in love with Arabella and proposes. Arabella, not knowing him to be aware of her deception from the start, tearfully refuses, realising that she is indeed in love with him, but cannot reveal her deception without risking his love. Meanwhile, Arabella's brother Bertram has come to town on 100 pounds that he won. The wealthy friends he makes soon lead him into debt and Arabella decides she must accept Mr Beaumaris's proposal in order to pay off Bertram's debts. Mr Beaumaris guesses the cause of her sudden reversal and is amused, knowing her to be in love with him, despite the appearance of the situation. She insists they elope together since she's desperate and he agrees, but instead takes her to visit his grandmother's house. Once they arrive, she reveals that she is not a wealthy woman, he reveals that he knew all along and that he went to visit her family. All is resolved by the fact that his fortune is so massive, the lack of hers will never be noticed, and the lack of fortune for her brothers and sisters will be explained away by an eccentric uncle who left the money to Arabella.

== Arabella’s Character ==
The titular character Arabella is described as impetuous and impulsive. “…her besetting sin, as her Mama had frequently told her, was the impetuosity which led her into so many scrapes.” She is also compassionate, courageous, and warm hearted. Following her beloved papa’s teachings, she impetuously defends those in need: a horse mercilessly beaten on the streets of London, a housemaid whose jaw is swollen with toothache, a climbing boy whose feet are scorched to force him up the chimney, a small mongrel dog tortured by a gang of louts. Her impetuous decisions lead her into her final “scrape” — seeking to hastily elope to save her brother from debtors prison. The books ends with her encouraging dear Robert (Mr. Beaumaris) to offer a job to Leaky Peg, a “doxy” she met near “the corner of Duck Lane, Tothill Fields.”

Robert Beaumaris describes her character to his grandmother:

‘She is the most enchanting little wretch I ever encountered,’ he said. ‘When she is trying to convince me that she is up to every move in the social game, she contrives to appear much like any other female, but when, as happens all too often for my comfort, her compassion is stirred, she is ready to go to any lengths to succour the object of her pity. If I marry her, she will undoubtedly expect me to launch a campaign for the alleviation of the lot of climbing-boys, and will very likely turn my house into an asylum for stray curs.’

== Analysis ==
Mukul Kesavan of The Telegraph observed similarities between the character of Arabella and many of Heyer's other Regency heroines: while they all travel to London to find wealthy husbands, they do so on their own terms. Kesavan said,

"The remarkable thing about Heyer’s Regency novels is the way in which her heroines manage not to dance the marriage minuet, their awkward refusal to 'fit' the model of the eager, conforming debutante. Her heroines aren’t revolutionaries or even proto-feminists: they accept the mannered marriage market as the way of the world, but they work to make room for themselves and their natures within its constraints."

Writing for Tor.com, Mari Ness stated that Arabella was notable for being one of the few of Heyer's novels to depict real signs of poverty. Ness wrote that Heyer

"decided to introduce a touch—a mere touch—of poverty, as if to acknowledge that even in the idealistic Regency world of her creation, genuine, real poverty could appear. And as if to immediately soften this, she surrounded this poverty with witty dialogue, romantic banter, and what by all appearances is the expected romantic ending."

In a 1949 review, The New York Times critiqued the novel for showing "no sign of the rough and sordid London of Swift and Defoe... Nor is there the least sign of the robustness and vitality that made those masters' creations come to life... Arabella and the Nonesuch are stereotypes from The Ladies Monthly Museum."

Ness considers Arabella to be a fan favourite, "with passages that are among [Heyer's] very best, and some of her most ironic writing. And up until those last pages, it is one of Heyer’s most delightful, comforting novels, filled with laugh out loud moments and sharp comments on human behavior." Ness disliked the ending, especially as it seems that Beaumaris' will and superior social standing will be employed to overrule his new wife's criticism of London Society and willingness to aid the downridden.
