= Tatjana Sais =

German actress

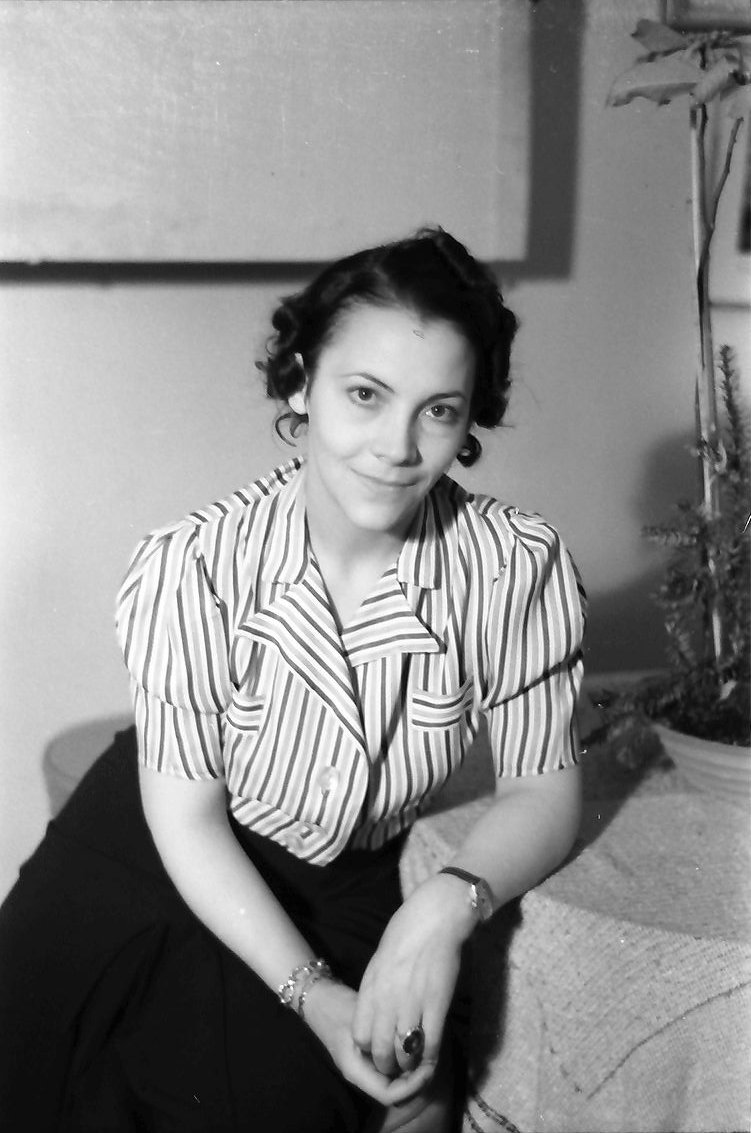
- Born: 28 January 1910; Frankfurt, German Empire
- Died: 26 February 1981 (aged 71); West Berlin, West Germany
- Resting place: Luisenfriedhof III
- Occupation: Actress
- Years active: 1937–1967
- Spouse(s): Günter Neumann (?–?) Sir Hugh Greene (m. 1970)

Tatjana Sais, Lady Greene (28 January 1910 – 26 February 1981) was a German film actress. She appeared in 20 films between 1937 and 1967 and was a member of the jury at the 1st Berlin International Film Festival. She was married to Günter Neumann and later to Sir Hugh Greene.

== Selected filmography ==
- Robert and Bertram (1939)
- Fireworks (1954)
- I Was an Ugly Girl (1955)
- The Angel Who Pawned Her Harp (1959)
- Praetorius (1965)
- Hocuspocus (1966)
- Glorious Times at the Spessart Inn (1967)
