= Manfred Rommel =

German politician (1928–2013)

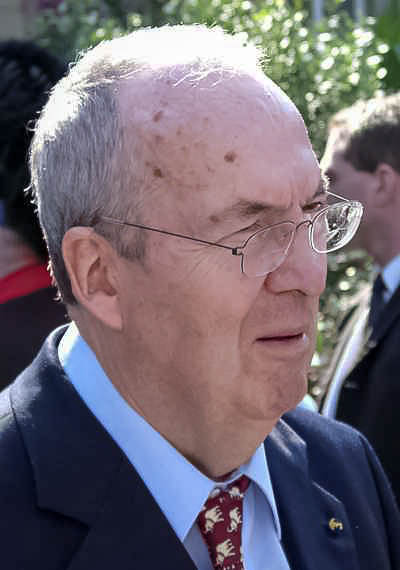
- Rommel in 2004

Mayor of Stuttgart
- In office 1974–1996
- Preceded by: Arnulf Klett
- Succeeded by: Wolfgang Schuster

Personal details
- Born: 24 December 1928 Stuttgart, Germany
- Died: 7 November 2013 (aged 84) Stuttgart, Germany
- Party: Christian Democratic Union
- Spouse: Liselotte Daiber (m. 1954)
- Children: 1
- Occupation: Lawyer, politician

Manfred Rommel (24 December 1928 – 7 November 2013) was a German politician belonging to the Christian Democratic Union (CDU), who served as mayor of Stuttgart from 1974 until 1996. Rommel's policies were described as tolerant and liberal, and he was one of the most popular municipal politicians in Germany. He was the recipient of numerous foreign honours. He was the only son of Wehrmacht Field Marshal Erwin Rommel and his wife, Lucia Maria Mollin (1894–1971), and contributed to the establishment of museums in his father's honour. He was also known for his friendship with George Patton IV and David Montgomery, the sons of his father's two principal military adversaries.

== Early life ==
Rommel was born in Stuttgart and entered service as a Luftwaffenhelfer (air force assistant) in 1943 at age 14, serving in an anti-aircraft battery. He considered joining the Waffen SS, but his father opposed it. On 14 October 1944, he was present at his parents' house when his father was led off to be forced to commit suicide for his alleged complicity in the 20 July plot to assassinate Adolf Hitler, which was publicly portrayed by the Nazi leadership as a death resulting from a war injury. In February 1945, Rommel was dismissed from air force service and in March was conscripted into the paramilitary Reichsarbeitsdienst service. Stationed in Riedlingen at the end of April, he deserted just before the French First Army entered the town. He was taken prisoner of war, was interrogated by (among others) General Jean de Lattre de Tassigny, and disclosed the truth about his father's death.

== Post-war life and career ==
In 1947, he took his Abitur while studying in Biberach an der Riß and went on to study law at the University of Tübingen. He married Liselotte in 1954 and had a daughter named Catherine. After a stint working as a lawyer, in 1956 Rommel entered the civil service and later became state secretary in the state government of Baden-Württemberg.

In 1974, Rommel succeeded Arnulf Klett as Oberbürgermeister (equivalent to Mayor) of Stuttgart by winning 58.5% of the votes in the second round of elections, defeating Peter Conradi of the Social Democratic Party (SPD). He was re-elected after the first round of elections in 1982 with 69.8% and in 1990 with 71.7% of the votes. As the mayor of Stuttgart, he was also known for his effort to give the Red Army Faction terrorists who had committed suicide at the Stuttgart-Stammheim prison a proper burial, despite the concern that the graves would become a pilgrimage point for radical leftists. In defending his decision against criticism from within his own party, Rommel said: "All enmity must end at some point and I think in this case it ends with [their] death."

While Oberbürgermeister of Stuttgart, Rommel began a much-publicised friendship with U.S. Army Major General George Patton IV, the son of his father's World War II adversary, General George S. Patton, who was assigned to the VII Corps headquarters near the city. Additionally, he was also friends with David Montgomery, 2nd Viscount Montgomery of Alamein, the son of his father's other great adversary, Field Marshal Bernard Law Montgomery, a friendship viewed by some as a symbol of Anglo-German reconciliation following the War and West Germany's admission into NATO.

In a 1996 celebration at the Württemberg State Theatre, Manfred Rommel received the highest German civil distinction, the Bundesverdienstkreuz. In his speech, Helmut Kohl put particular emphasis on the good relations that were kept and built upon between France and Germany during Rommel's tenure as Oberbürgermeister of Stuttgart. A few days after this distinction was given to Rommel, the city of Stuttgart offered him the Honorary Citizen Award. He risked his popularity when he stood out for the fair treatment of foreign immigrants, who were being drawn to Stuttgart by its booming economy. As mayor, Rommel also exerted "tight control over the city's finances, reducing its debt and enabling a radical makeover of the local infrastructure, especially roads and public transport [while working]...to foster Franco-German relations."

Rommel's political position was described as tolerant and liberal.

== Outside politics ==
Having retired from politics in 1996, Rommel was still in demand as an author and stirring speaker, despite suffering from Parkinson's disease. He wrote various political and humorous books. He was known for his down-to-earth and often funny sayings and quotations. Occasionally, he wrote articles for the Stuttgarter Zeitung.

Rommel collaborated with Basil Liddell-Hart in the publication of The Rommel Papers, a collection of diaries, letters and notes that his father wrote during and after his military campaigns. He was awarded several foreign awards, including the Commander of the Order of the British Empire (CBE), the French Légion d'honneur, the US Medal of Freedom and the highest grade of the German federal order of merit. He died on 7 November 2013, survived by his wife Lieselotte and his daughter Catherine.

== Movies ==
In the following movies about his father during the Second World War, Manfred Rommel was played by the following actors:

- 1951: The Desert Fox: The Story of Rommel (German: Rommel, der Wüstenfuchs) (Director: Henry Hathaway), William Reynolds as Manfred Rommel
- 1962: The Longest Day (German: der längste Tag) (Director(s): Annakin/Marton/Wicki/Oswald/Zanuck), Michael Hinz as Manfred Rommel. Hinz's father Werner Hinz played Field Marshal Rommel in the film
- 1989: War and Remembrance (TV-Series), Matthias Hinze as Manfred Rommel
- 2012: Rommel (Director: Niki Stein), Patrick Mölleken as Manfred Rommel

Additionally, interviews with Manfred concerning his father are featured in the 2021 documentary Rommel: The Soldier, The Son, and Hitler, narrated by Greg Kinnear.

== Honours ==
Manfred Rommel once wrote about his many honours: "Die Zahl der Titel will nicht enden. Am Grabstein stehet: bitte wenden!" which translates as: "The number of honours seems to be endless. The inscription on my gravestone will read: Please turn over!"

- 1979: Honorary citizen of Cairo
- 1982: Orden wider den tierischen Ernst, for his sense of humor
- 1982: Grand Officer in the Order of Orange-Nassau of the Netherlands
- 1982: Honorary Senator of the University of Applied Sciences Stuttgart
- 1984: General-Clay Medal
- 1985: Knight of the Legion of Honour of the French Republic
- 1987: Guardian of Jerusalem
- 1987: Grand Officer Cross of Merit of the Italian Republic
- 1990: Commander of the Order of the British Empire
- 1990: Medal of Merit of the State of Baden-Württemberg
- 1990: Dr. Friedrich Lehner Medal for the development of public transport
- 1990: Bonding medal for German-American friendship
- 1992: Honorary doctorate from the University of Maryland
- 1993: Golden Order of Merit of the IAAF
- 1995: Otto Hirsch Medal
- 1996: Honorary Citizen of the City of Stuttgart
- 1996: Chairman of the joint chiefs of staff award for distinguished public service
- 1996: Friedrich E. Vogt Medal for Services to the Swabian dialect
- 1996: Honorary doctorate of the University of Wales
- 1996: Great Cross of Merit (1978) with star (1989) and sash (1996) *Order of Merit of the Federal Republic of Germany
- 1996: Appointed Professor
- 1997: Price of the Entente Franco-Allemande for the German-French friendship
- 1997: Honorary member of the German Association of Cities
- 1997: Heinz Herbert Karry Prize
- 1998: Dolf Sternberger Award for
- 2008: Hans-Peter-Stihl Preis

=== Things named after him ===
- After his death, Stuttgart Airport added "Manfred Rommel" to its official long form name.
- A central square in Stuttgart which will be created in the course of Stuttgart 21 is to be named after him.

== Works ==
- Abschied vom Schlaraffenland. Gedanken über Politik und Kultur. Deutsche Verlags-Anstalt, Stuttgart, München 1987, ISBN 3-421-06081-9.
- Manfred Rommels gesammelte Sprüche, Gefunden und herausgegeben von Ulrich Frank-Planitz, Engelhorn Verlag, Stuttgart 1988, ISBN 3-87203-050-7
- Wir verwirrten Deutschen. Ullstein, Frankfurt am Main 1989, ISBN 3-548-34614-6.
- Manfred Rommels gesammelte Gedichte. Engelhorn-Verlag, Stuttgart 1993
- Die Grenzen des Möglichen. Ansichten und Einsichten. Deutsche Verlags-Anstalt, Stuttgart, München 1995, ISBN 3-421-05001-5.
- Trotz allem heiter. Erinnerungen. Deutsche Verlags-Anstalt, Stuttgart, München 1998, ISBN 3-421-05151-8.
- Neue Sprüche und Gedichte. Gesammelt und herausgegeben von Ulrich Frank-Planitz, Hohenheim-Verlag, Stuttgart 2000, ISBN 978-3-89850-002-9
- Manfred Rommels gesammelte Sprüche, dva, Stuttgart 2001, ISBN 978-3-421-05573-6.
- Holzwege zur Wirklichkeit. Hohenheim-Verlag, Stuttgart 2001, ISBN 3-89850-026-8.
- Soll und Haben. Deutsche Verlags-Anstalt, Stuttgart, München 2001, ISBN 3-421-05579-3.
- Das Land und die Welt. Hohenheim-Verlag, Stuttgart 2003, ISBN 3-89850-099-3.
- Ganz neue Sprüche & Gedichte und andere Einfälle. Hohenheim-Verlag, Stuttgart 2004, ISBN 3-89850-123-X
- Vom Schlaraffenland ins Jammertal?. Hohenheim-Verlag, Stuttgart 2006, ISBN 3-89850-137-X.
- Gedichte und Parodien. Hohenheim-Verlag, Stuttgart 2006, ISBN 3-89850-151-5.
- Manfred Rommels schwäbisches Allerlei. Eine bunte Sammlung pfiffiger Sprüche, witziger Gedichte und zumeist amüsanter Geschichten. Hohenheim-Verlag, Stuttgart 2008, ISBN 978-3-89850-170-5.
- Auf der Suche nach der Zukunft. Zeitzeichen unter dem Motto: Ohne Nein kein Ja. Hohenheim-Verlag, Stuttgart 2008, ISBN 978-3-89850-173-6.
- 1944 – das Jahr der Entscheidung. Erwin Rommel in Frankreich (1944: The year of decision: Erwin Rommel in France), Hohenheim-Verlag, Stuttgart 2010, ISBN 978-3-89850-196-5.
- Die amüsantesten Texte. Hohenheim-Verlag, Stuttgart 2010, ISBN 978-3-89850-203-0.

== Bibliography ==
- Puhl, Widmar: Manfred Rommel: Der Oberbürgermeister. (in German). Zürich/Wiesbaden: Orell Füssli 1990, ISBN 3-280-01997-4.
