= Johanna von Koczian =

German actress (1933–2024)

- Von Koczian, c. 1960
- Born: 30 October 1933; Berlin, Brandenburg, Prussia, Germany
- Died: 10 February 2024 (aged 90); Berlin, Germany
- Occupations: Actress, singer
- Years active: 1955–2017
- Spouse: Dietrich Haugk (div. 1961) Wolf Kabitzky (m. 1966; died 2004)

Johanna von Koczian (pronounced [ˌjoˈha.na fɔn ˈkɔ.t͡ʃi.aːn], née von Kóczián-Miskolczy, 30 October 1933 – 10 February 2024) was an Austrian-German actress. She grew up in Salzburg where Gustaf Gründgens offered her a role at the 1951 Salzburg Festival, and she played at several German theatres. She had her first film role in the 1957 film Victor and Victoria, and her breakthrough a year later in Wir Wunderkinder which earned her a German Film Award. She was named "the German Audrey Hepburn" then. She appeared in many films, also on television, became popular again as a singer with the 1977 hit "Das bißchen Haushalt", presented television series and authored books for children and youths. She returned to the stage for comedies such as Glorious!, performed with great success in Berlin in 2010.

== Life and career ==
Johanna von Koczian-Miskolczy was born in Berlin on 30 October 1933, the daughter of Gustav von Koczian-Miskolczy (1877–1958), and his third wife, Lydia Alexandra. She grew up in Salzburg, where she was trained at the Mozarteum as an actress with singing instructions, from 1950 to 1952. Gustaf Gründgens offered her a role at the 1951 Salzburg Festival. She played on stage at the Landestheater Tübingen, the Wuppertaler Bühnen, Schillertheater and Schlosspark Theater in Berlin, the Residenztheater in Munich and the Theater in der Josefstadt in Vienna; her stage roles included characters by Shakespeare, Lessing and Kleist. She portrayed Anne Frank in Berlin. Due to her singing abilities, she often played in musicals, such as the title role of My Fair Lady.

She starred in the 1957 remake of Victor and Victoria, alongside Georg Thomalla and Johannes Heesters. Her breakthrough in film was in 1958 her role in Kurt Hoffmann's Wir Wunderkinder alongside Hansjörg Felmy, which earned her a German Film Award and the Preis der Deutschen Filmkritik. She appeared in dozens of films and television shows, including a starring role in the 1961 film Die Ehe des Herrn Mississippi, after Friedrich Dürrenmatt's play by the same name; Hoffmann's film, starring also Felmy, O. E. Hasse and Martin Held, was entered into the 11th Berlin International Film Festival. As a dubbing actor, she was the German voice of Elizabeth Taylor and Bibi Andersson, among others.

She became popular again for a 1977 satirical schlager, "Das bißchen Haushalt ... sagt mein Mann" (The little bit of housework ... says my husband), after singing it in Dieter Thomas Heck's Hitparade show. She was a television presenter, for example for the series Erkennen Sie die Melodie?, and wrote books. In 2010, at age 77, she portrayed Florence Foster Jenkins, "the worst opera singer in the world", in the comedy Glorious! at the Theater am Kurfürstendamm in Berlin to great success.

=== Personal life ===
After a brief marriage with film director Dietrich Haugk which ended in divorce in 1961, Johanna von Koczian was married from 1966 to music producer Wolf Kabitzky, who died in July 2004. The couple had a daughter, Alexandra von Koczian, who also became an actress. The family lived in Berlin.

Von Koczian moved to a nursing home in the Grunewald district in 2017, withdrawing from public life. She died on 10 February 2024, at the age of 90.

== Films ==
Von Koczian appeared in films and television including:

- Victor and Victoria (1957)
- Petersburger Nächte (1958)
- Wir Wunderkinder (Aren't We Wonderful? 1958)
- Menschen im Netz (People in the Net 1959)
- For the First Time (1959)
- Jacqueline (1959)
- Bezaubernde Arabella (Adorable Arabella 1959)
- Heldinnen (1960)
- Lampenfieber (Stage Fright 1960)
- Agatha, laß das Morden sein! (Agatha, Stop That Murdering! 1960)
- Die Ehe des Herrn Mississippi (The Marriage of Mr. Mississippi 1961)
- Unser Haus in Kamerun (Our House in Cameroon 1961)
- Straße der Verheißung (Street of Temptation 1962)
- Das Liebeskarussell (Who Wants to Sleep 1965)
- Stewardessen (1969, TV series, 6 episodes)
- Hoftheater (1975, TV series, 13 episodes)
- Derrick – Season 2, Episode 08: "Pfandhaus" (1975)
- Derrick – Season 3, Episode 05: "Schock" (1976)
- Single Bells (1997)

== Books ==
Koczian wrote books for children and youths, including:

- Abenteuer in der Vollmondnacht
- Der geheimnisvolle Graf (sequel)
- Sommerschatten
- Das Narrenspiel.
