= Lina Carstens =

German actress (1892–1978)

Lina Carstens (6 December 1892 – 22 September 1978) was a German film and theatre actress. On stage she appeared in plays by Gerhart Hauptmann, Arthur Schnitzler, and August Strindberg, and also starred in many films.

== Early life ==
Lina Carstens was born on 6 December 1892 in Wiesbaden.

== Career ==
Carstens began her career as an actress before the First World War at the Court Theatre in Karlsruhe. It belonged to during the First World War and shortly thereafter the cabaret retort to the writer Ringelnatz to. She was married to the author Otto Ernst Sutter until his death in 1970.

In Konstanz she played the first Mother Courage in the eponymous play by Bertolt Brecht on a German stage.

She began her film career 1922. The director Douglas Sirk gave her various leading roles.

After the Second World War she continued her career as a character actress. She also managed to get roles in the New German Cinema.

In the ZDF television series Der Bastian (1973) she had a role alongside Horst Janson and Karin Anselm.

In 1975 Carstens starred in the film Lina Braake, directed by Bernhard Sinkel.

She also worked extensively as a voice actor and was dubbed over Margaret Rutherford (Passport to Pimlico), Françoise Rosay (Le Joueur) and Helene Thimig (Decision Before Dawn).

== Awards and honours ==
In 1939 Carstens was named a state actor by Joseph Goebbels.

In 1972 she won the Film Award for her many years of service, in 1975 she was honoured with the same award for her performance in Lina Braake.

== Death ==
Carstens died on 22 September 1978 in Munich. She received a burial at sea in the North Sea.

== Selected filmography ==
- Leidendes Land (1921)
- Verkrachte Existenzen (1924)
- April, April! (1935) - Mathilde Lampe
- The Girl from the Marsh Croft (1935) - Mutter Christmann
- To New Shores (1937) - Bänkelsängerin
- The Broken Jug (1937) - Marthe Rull
- Tango Notturno (1937) - Frau Wattson
- Grossalarm (1938) - Frau Timmler
- Heimat (1938) - Fränze von Klebs
- The Curtain Falls (1939) - Frau Florian
- Man for Man (1939) - Mutter Handrup
- The Eternal Spring (1940) - Lohhofbäuerin
- Passion (1940)
- Commissioner Eyck (1940) - Mrs. Filter
- Bal paré (1940) - Gemischtwarenhändlerin Lina Brunnhuber
- My Daughter Doesn't Do That (1940) - Baronin Liebrenz
- Wie konntest Du, Veronika! (1940) - Fräulein Schwertfeger
- Für die Katz (1940) - Wirtin Katrin Geerken
- Der dunkle Punkt (1940) - Frau des Hauswirts
- Das leichte Mädchen (1940) - Großtante Emma
- A Gust of Wind (1942) - Frau Galassi
- Wedding in Barenhof (1942) - Fränze von Hanckel
- Die Jungfern vom Bischofsberg (1943)
- ...und die Musik spielt dazu (1943) - Therese Staudinger
- Der Engel mit dem Saitenspiel (1944) - Maria Theresia, seine Schwester
- The Green Salon (1944) - Klara, 'das Pferd', Haushälterin bei Anna Bütow
- The Last Illusion (1949) - Emma
- Dr. Holl (1951) - Frau von Bergmann
- Bluebeard (1951) - Amme
- My Name is Niki (1952) - Frau Altmann
- The Great Temptation (1952) - Frau Dr. Eibichler
- Illusion in a Minor Key (1952) - Bertha
- A Heart Plays False (1953) - Mutter Pratsch
- Arlette Conquers Paris (1953) - Concierge Frau Pézat
- Fanfare of Marriage (1953) - Mrs. Yell
- Secretly Still and Quiet (1953) - Tante Titania
- The Life of Surgeon Sauerbruch (1954) - Oberschwester
- Fireworks (1954) - Tante Paula
- Dear Miss Doctor (1954) - Oberin des Klosters
- The Missing Miniature (1954) - Frau Külz
- Hello, My Name Is Cox (1955)
- Beloved Enemy (1955) - Mrs. Durham
- Jackboot Mutiny (1955) - Frau des Küsters (uncredited)
- Sky Without Stars (1955)
- Holiday in Tyrol (1956) - Frau Kramer
- My Husband's Getting Married Today (1956) - Tante Erna
- Kleines Zelt und große Liebe (1956) - Fraeulein Saint-Cyr
- The Spessart Inn (1958) - Cook (uncredited)
- I Was All His (1958) - Frau Mertens
- Zum goldenen Ochsen (1958) - Frau Mäglin
- Resurrection (1958) - Matrjona
- Wir Wunderkinder (1958) - Vette
- The Angel Who Pawned Her Harp (1959) - Frau Feuerhake
- Arzt ohne Gewissen (1959) - Frau Kleinhans
- The Man Who Walked Through the Wall (1959) - Frau Höppke - eine alte Frau
- Love Now, Pay Later (1959) - Frau Huber, Vermieterin
- Das schwarze Schaf (1960) - Mrs. Smith
- Gustav Adolf's Page (1960) - Haushälterin Therese
- Liebling - Ich muß Dich erschießen (1962) - Frau Terraz
- He Can't Stop Doing It (1962) - Mrs. Smith
- Moartea lui Joe Indianul (1968) - Aunt Polly
- Tom Sawyers und Huckleberry Finns Abenteuer (1968, TV Mini-Series) - Tante Polly Jones
- Der Bastian (1973, TV Series, 13 episodes) - Oma Martha Guthmann
- The Robber Hotzenplotz (1974) - Großmutter
- Three Men in the Snow (1974) - Frau Tobler
- The Unguarded House (1975, TV Movie) - Filme para televisão
- Lina Braake (1975) - Lina Braake
- Berlinger (1975)
- Die Ilse ist weg (1976, TV Movie) - Oma Janda
- Heinrich (1977) - Dienerin Riebisch
- Haus der Frauen (1978, TV Movie) - Großmutter Celina
- The Rider on the White Horse (1978) - Trin Jans
