= Ullrich Haupt =

Ullrich Haupt may refer to:

- Ullrich Haupt (actor, born 1887) (1887–1931), German-American actor
- Ullrich Haupt (actor, born 1915) (1915–1991), American-born German actor, son of above
