= 1984 Baden-Württemberg state election =

State election in Germany

- 25 March 1984

All 126 seats in the Landtag of Baden-Württemberg 64 seats needed for a majority
- Turnout: 4,706,241 (71.21%) ▼0.78%
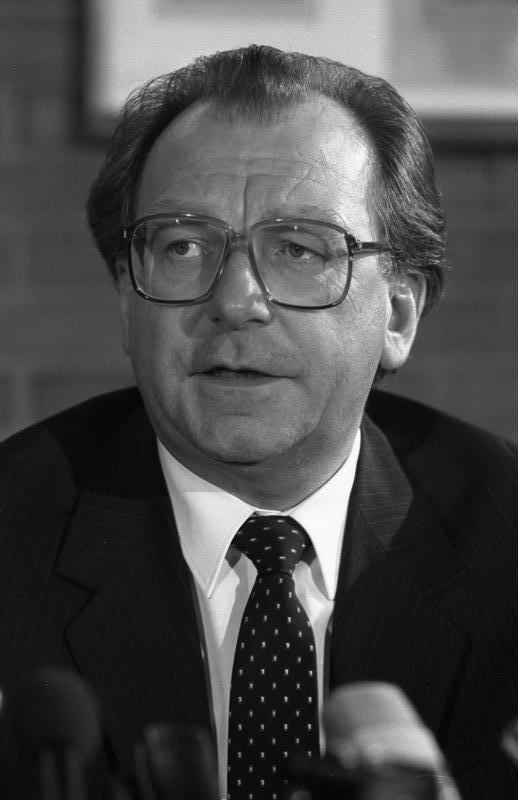

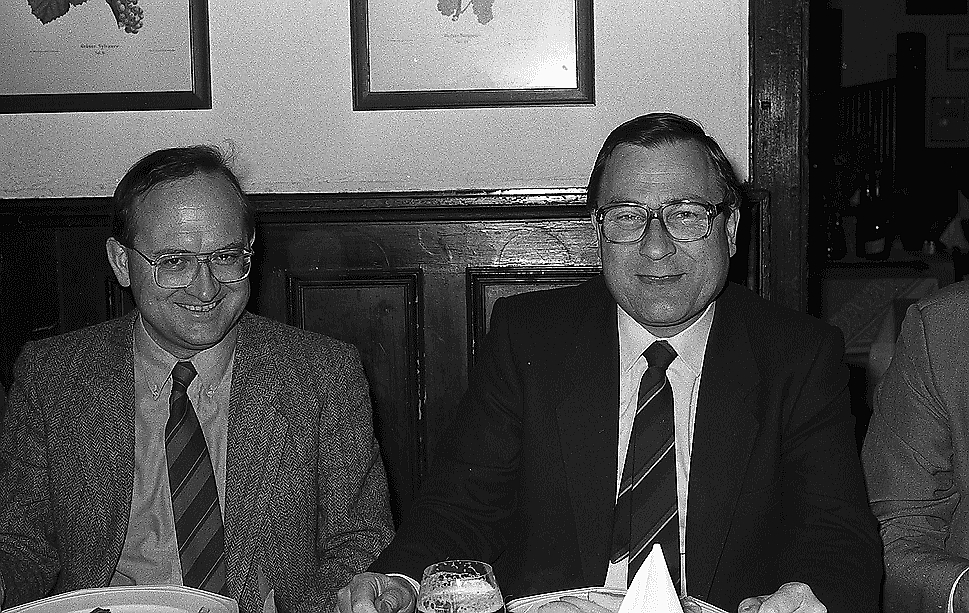

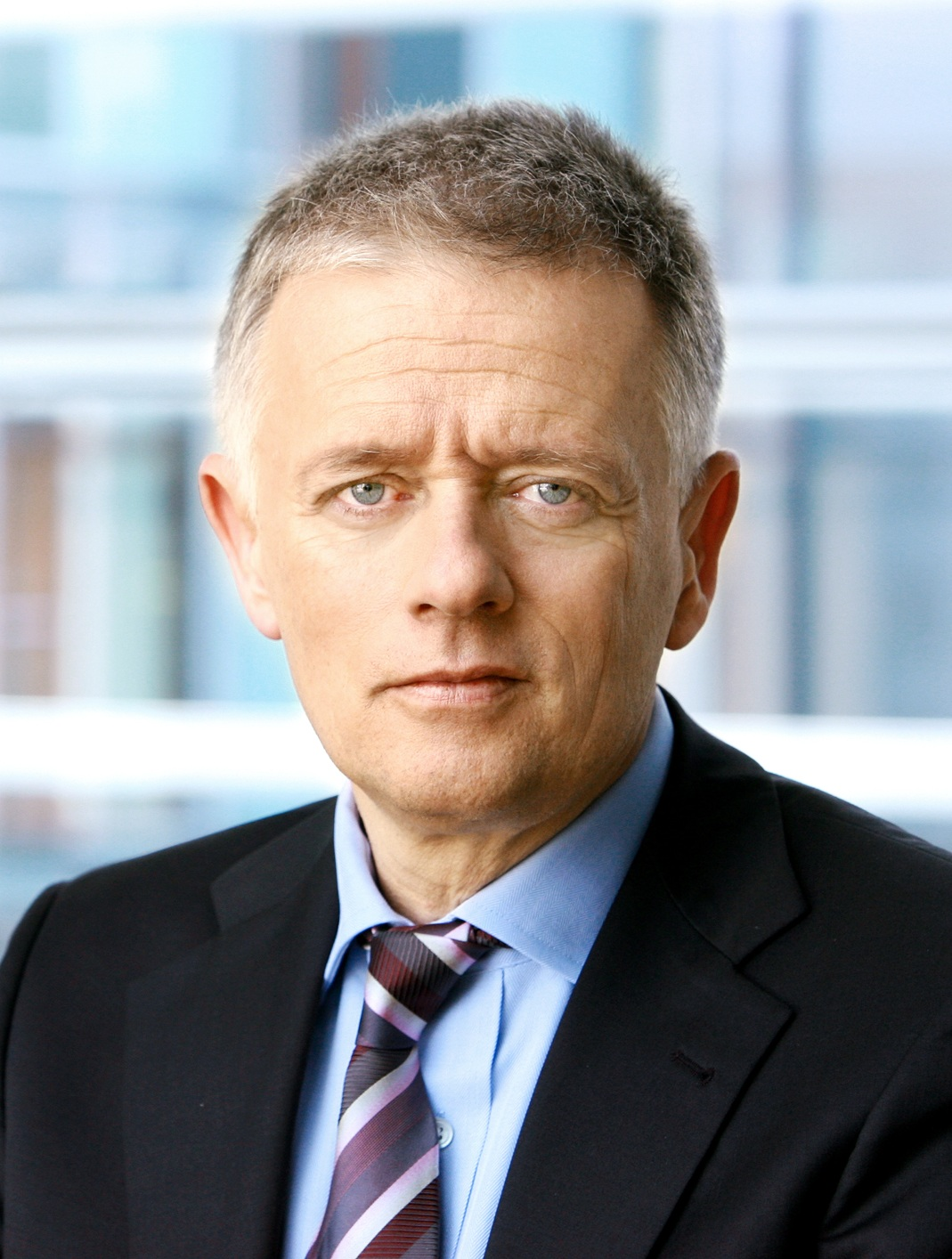

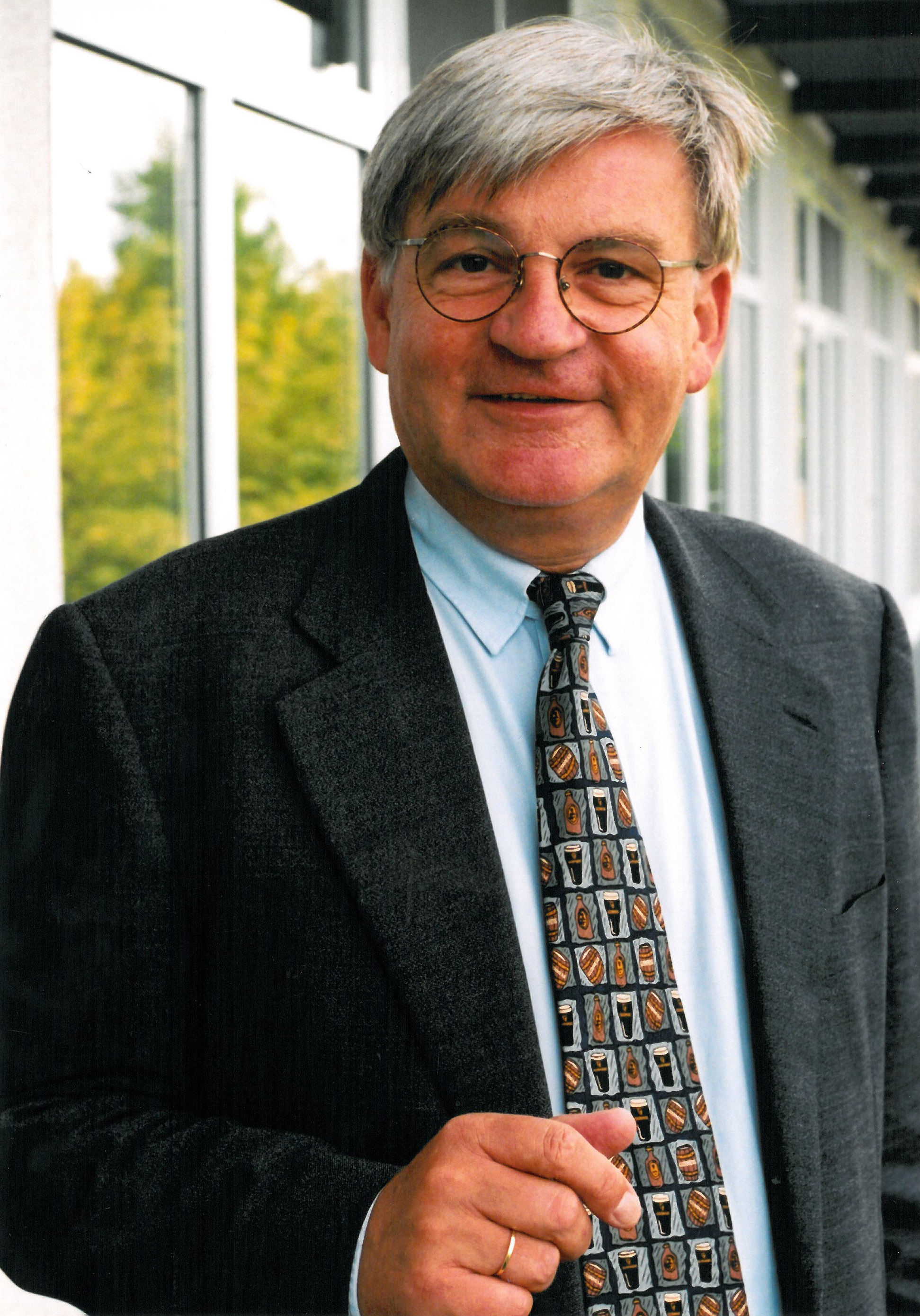
	First party	Second party	Third party
Leader	Lothar Späth	Ulrich Lang	Fritz Kuhn
Party	CDU	SPD	Greens
Last election	68 seats, 53.35%	40 seats, 32.55%	6 seats, 5.35%
Seats won	68	41	9
Seat change	Steady	▲1	▲3
Popular vote	2,412,085	1,507,088	372,374
Percentage	51.87%	32.41%	8.01%
Swing	▼1.48%	▼0.14%	▲2.66%
	Fourth party
Leader	Jürgen Morlok
Party	FDP
Last election	10 seats, 8.30%
Seats won	8
Seat change	▼2
Popular vote	333,386
Percentage	7.17%
Swing	▼1.13%
- Results for the single-member constituencies
Minister-President before election
Lothar Späth
CDU
Elected Minister-President
Lothar Späth
CDU

The 1984 Baden-Württemberg state election was held on 25 March 1984 to elect the members of the 8th Landtag of Baden-Württemberg. The incumbent Christian Democratic Union (CDU) government under Minister-President Lothar Späth was re-elected, retaining its majority.

== Parties ==
The table below lists parties represented in the previous Landtag of Baden-Württemberg.

Name		Ideology	Leader(s)	1980 result	
Name		Ideology	Leader(s)	Votes (%)	Seats
CDU	Christian Democratic Union of Germany; Christlich Demokratische Union Deutschlands	Christian democracy	Lothar Späth	53.35%	68 / 124
SPD	Social Democratic Party of Germany; Sozialdemokratische Partei Deutschlands	Social democracy	Ulrich Lang	32.55%	40 / 124
FDP	Free Democratic Party; Freie Demokratische Partei	Classical liberalism	Jürgen Morlok	8.30%	10 / 124
Grüne	The Greens; Die Grünen	Green politics	Fritz Kuhn	5.35%	6 / 124

== Results ==
Summary of the 25 March 1984 election results for the Landtag of Baden-Württemberg
Party	Votes	%	+/-	Seats	+/-	Seats %
Christian Democratic Union (CDU)	2,412,085	51.87	▼1.48	68	Steady	53.97
Social Democratic Party (SPD)	1,507,088	32.41	▼0.14	41	▲1	32.54
The Greens (Grüne)	372,374	8.01	▲2.66	9	▲3	7.14
Free Democratic Party (FDP)	333,386	7.17	▼1.31	8	▼2	6.35
German Communist Party (DKP)	13,620	0.29	▲0.03	0	±0	0
European Workers' Party	1,632	0.04	▲0.04	0	±0	0
Free German Workers' Party	383	0.00	0.00	0	±0	0
Total	4,650,186	98.79		126	▲2	
Invalid votes	56,055	1.21				
Voter turnout	4,706,241	71.21	▼0.78			
