= Henry Vahl =

German actor

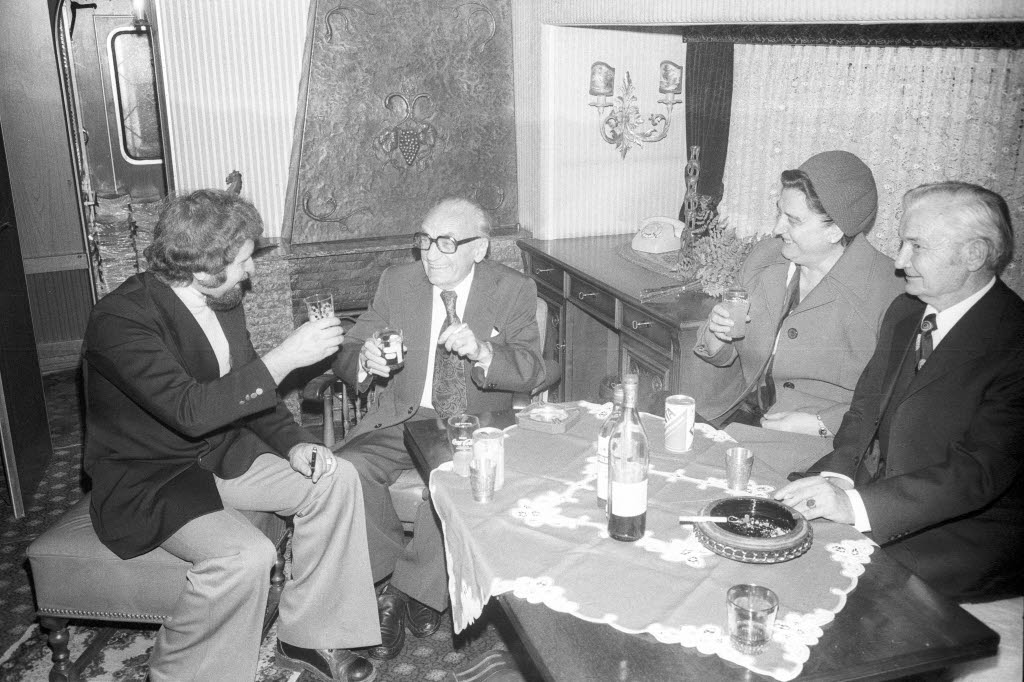
- The actor Henry Vahl (2nd from left) in 1976.
- Born: 26 October 1897; Stralsund, German Empire
- Died: 21 July 1977 (aged 79); Hamburg, West Germany
- Occupation: Actor
- Years active: 1935-1976 (film & TV)

Signature
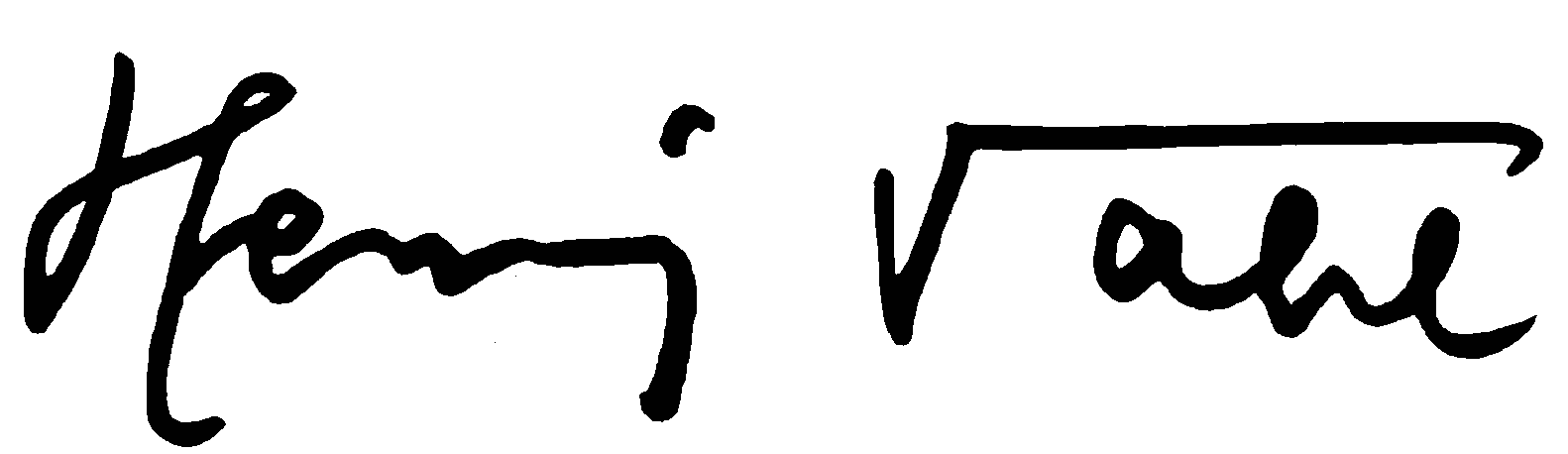

Henry Vahl (26 October 1897 – 21 July 1977) was a German stage, film and television actor. From 1958 he was a star of the Ohnsorg-Theater in Hamburg. His younger brother Bruno Vahl-Berg (1903 – 1984) as well as his nephew Edgar Bessen (1933 – 2012) were also actors.

== Selected filmography ==
- The Muzzle (1958)
- Heart Without Mercy (1958)
- The Angel Who Pawned Her Harp (1959)
- Pension Schöller (1960)
- Stage Fright (1960)
- Our House in Cameroon (1961)
- Opa wird verkauft (1961, TV film)
- Snow White and the Seven Jugglers (1962)
- Meister Anecker (1965, TV film)
- Kein Auskommen mit dem Einkommen (1966, TV film)
- Tratsch im Treppenhaus (1966, TV film)
- Schneider Nörig (1969, TV film)
- Der Bürgermeisterstuhl (1969, TV film)
- Our Willi Is the Best (1971)
- Wir hau'n den Hauswirt in die Pfanne (1971)
- The Heath Is Green (1972)
- The Merry Quartet from the Filling Station (1972)
- Tears of Blood (1972)
- Spring in Immenhof (1974)

== Bibliography ==
- Gregor Ball & Eberhard Spiess. Heinz Rühmann und seine Filme. Goldmann, 1982.
