= Wolfgang Schuster =

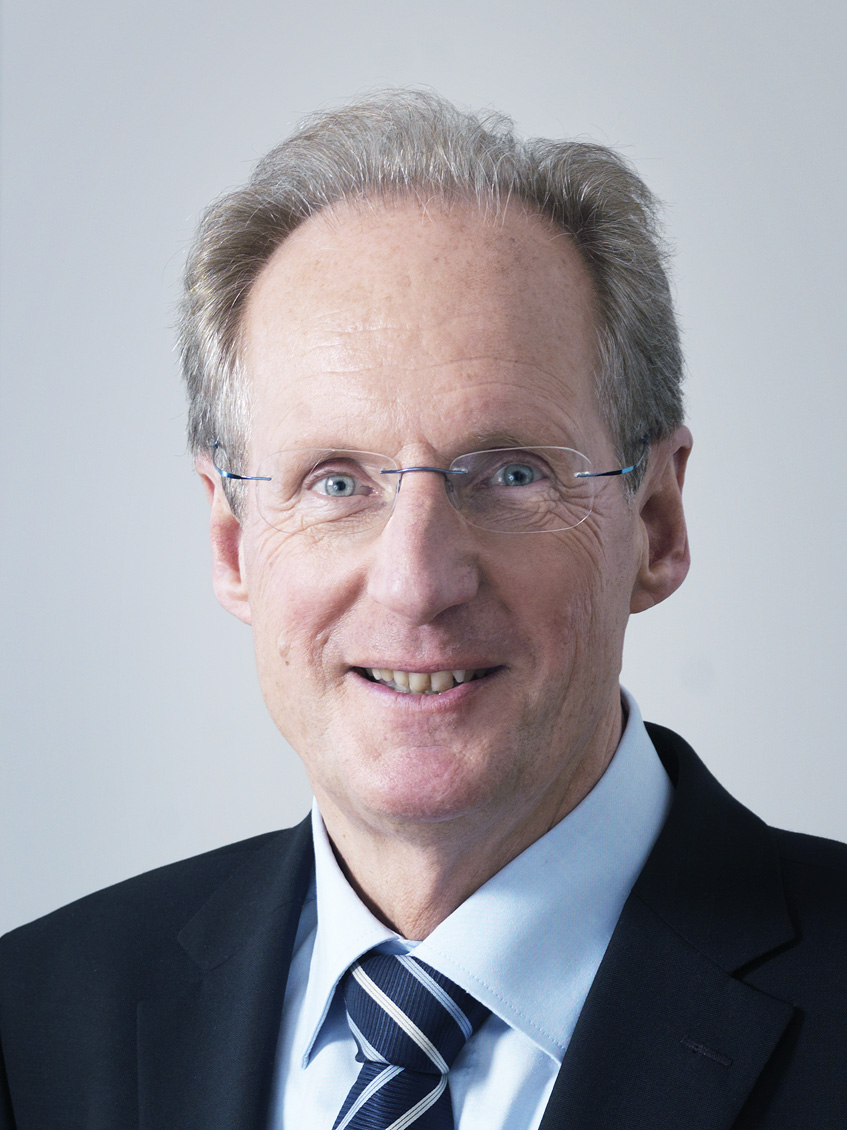
- Schuster in 2012

Mayor of Stuttgart
- In office January 1997 – 6 January 2013
- Preceded by: Manfred Rommel
- Succeeded by: Fritz Kuhn

Personal details
- Born: 5 September 1949 (age 77) Ulm, Germany
- Party: Christian Democratic Union
- Children: 3

Wolfgang Schuster (born 5 September 1949) is the former Lord Mayor of Stuttgart, Germany from 1997 to 2013. He was the successor to Manfred Rommel and is a member of the Christian Democratic Union (CDU).

== Career ==
=== Studies and early positions ===
Schuster studied law and political science in Tübingen, Geneva and Freiburg from 1969 to 1973. During his studies, he joined Guestfalia Tübingen, one of Germany's largest Catholic student associations. From 1974 to 1976, he trained in Ulm before completing his doctorate in civil law.

From 1976 to 1977, Schuster studied at the Paris École nationale d'administration (ENA).

=== Political career ===
In 1975, he represented the CDU on Ulm city council before acting as personal assistant to Manfred Rommel from 1985 onwards. In 1986, he was elected mayor of Schwäbisch Gmünd, where he was in office until 1993 before becoming burgomaster for the arts, education and sport in the Baden-Württemberg capital of Stuttgart in 1996.

In elections for the post of Lord Mayor of Stuttgart, he won the office in the second ballot on 10 November 1996, defeating Rezzo Schlauch, the candidate for the Alliance '90/The Greens on a relatively narrow margin of 43.1% versus 39.3%.

On 24 October 2004, Schuster was re-elected to the post in the second ballot with 53.3% of votes. His opponents were Ute Kumpf (SPD), who gained 45.2% of votes in the 2nd ballot, and Boris Palmer (Alliance '90/The Greens) – who withdrew his candidacy after the first ballot, indirectly recommending that his supporters should back Schuster instead.

On 6 December 2010, Schuster was elected president of the Council of European Municipalities and Regions.

When completing his term as Lord Mayor on 6 January 2013, he was made "honoured citizen" (Ehrenbürger). His successor Fritz Kuhn is a member of the German Green party, thus being the first post-war Mayor of Stuttgart not a member of CDU.

=== Political priorities ===
Schuster's political agenda includes the furthering of economic development and construction, intercultural dialogue and the promotion of child-friendly policies, among others.

He promotes the interests of intercultural dialogue and the sharing of religious ideas and is the founder of the Stuttgart Religious Round Table. As a representative of the Deutsche Städtetag, a voluntary coalition of county boroughs and district-affiliated towns in Germany, Schuster is a member of the broadcasting council of SWR radio.

Schuster has a declared aim to turn Stuttgart into Germany's most child-friendly city.

=== Achievements in office ===
In 2004, Schuster's re-election to office was attributed to Stuttgart's favourable economic development during his first term.

The biggest and most high-profile project during his office has been Stuttgart 21 – a major rail project to build a new underground through station for Stuttgart, also encompassing connections to existing surface and underground lines. The project was officially approved on 19 July 2007.

Schuster is longlisted for the 2008 World Mayor award and was voted second most successful Mayor in Germany in a survey by Wirtschaftswoche magazine. In 2004, he was the only (active) local politician nominated for the Frankfurter Allgemeine Zeitung "Reformer of the Year" award.

He was awarded a UNESCO Cities for Peace Prize for his work advancing integration of immigrant communities, and has established the EU Cities for Children network in cooperation with the Robert Bosch Foundation and Stuttgart-based carmaker Daimler.

In October 2008, the German Chancellor Angela Merkel named Schuster the German member of a 12-strong reflection group called the "Council of Wise Men to Rethink Europe" which is headed by former Spanish Prime Minister Felipe Gonzalez.

=== Criticism, controversy and setbacks ===
Shortly after funding was finalised for Stuttgart 21, the political opponents of Wolfgang Schuster were quick to condemn him for backtracking on a promise made during the mayor elections of 2004 – namely that he would allow the population of Stuttgart to decide the fate of Stuttgart 21 if the additional costs of the project for the city of Stuttgart amounted to more than €200 million. The agreement contained a provision that the local government would have to participate in covering cost increases, possibly up to an amount above €200 million, should the actual project costs significantly exceed planned costs. The Greens subsequently accused Schuster publicly of breaking his word. Schuster responded that the projected cost increase for the city of Stuttgart amounted to €84 million and thus significantly less than the amount for which he had promised a referendum.

In November 2007, a citizens' petition against the Stuttgart 21 project gained 67,000 signatures. After further legal wrangling appeals were submitted for a local referendum which experts subsequently deemed unlawful as contracts had already been signed and Stuttgart was not the main source (other backers include Deutsche Bahn, the state of Baden-Wuerttemberg and the EU).

Failed projects pointed to by opponents during the office of Schuster include Stuttgart's last place as German candidate for the 2012 Olympic Games and the stopping of a project to build a German Trump Tower in the north of Stuttgart.

== Personal life ==
Schuster has been married to a physician since 1979 and has three children and four grandchildren.
