= Peter Pasetti =

German actor (1916–1996)

- Born: 8 July 1916; Munich, Bavaria; German Empire
- Died: 23 May 1996 (aged 79); Dießen am Ammersee, Bavaria; Germany
- Other name: Peter Viktor Rolf Pasetti
- Occupation: Actor
- Years active: 1940 - 1992

Peter Pasetti (1916–1996) was a German stage, television and film actor. He played a number of leading roles in post-Second World War productions such as the operetta film A Night in Venice (1953). From the late 1950s he appeared increasingly on television.

== Filmography ==
=== Film ===
- The Girl from Barnhelm (1940) - 2. Offizier
- Venus on Trial (1941) - Pg. Pasetti (uncredited)
- Der Herr vom andern Stern (1948) - Minister
- Die kupferne Hochzeit (1948) - Per
- Du bist nicht allein (1949) - Michael Dieffenbach
- 0 Uhr 15 Zimmer 9 (1950) - Hans Wiegler
- Sensation in San Remo (1951) - Valenta
- Homesick for You (1952) - Kurt Hellwig
- A Night in Venice (1953) - Coramello
- Open Your Window (1953)
- Jonny Saves Nebrador (1953) - Lt. Col. Dacano
- The Red Prince (1954) - Johann Orth
- Dein Mund verspricht mir Liebe (1954) - Dr. Peter Waldenegg
- Girl with a Future (1954) - Achmed Spiro
- Clivia (1954) - Juan
- Three from Variety (1954)
- Verliebte Leute (1954) - Manfred Böttcher, Ingenieur
- Der Frontgockel (1955) - Oberleutnant von Flitsch, Flieger
- Spielbank-Affäre (1957) - Dr. Busch
- Time of the Innocent (1964)
- The Pacifist (1970) - Commissario
- Und Jimmy ging zum Regenbogen (1971) - Fedor Santarin
- The Chinese Miracle (1977) - Gaspardi
- Smaragd (1987) - Siggi Ronca

=== Television ===
- The Time Has Come (1960, TV series) - Lwawrence Hudson
- Am grünen Strand der Spree (1960, TV miniseries) - Peter Koslowski / Ettore da Babiena
- Spätere Heirat erwünscht (1966) - Harald Baum
- Alexander Zwo (1973, TV miniseries) - Anthony Baxter
- Derrick (several episodes of the long running police detective TV series)
- Die Rückkehr der Zeitmaschine (1984, TV film) - Dr. Risolani
- Teufels Großmutter (1986, TV series) - F. H. Heindl

== Bibliography ==
- Goble, Alan. The Complete Index to Literary Sources in Film. Walter de Gruyter, 1999.
