= Hansjörg Felmy =

German actor (1931–2007)

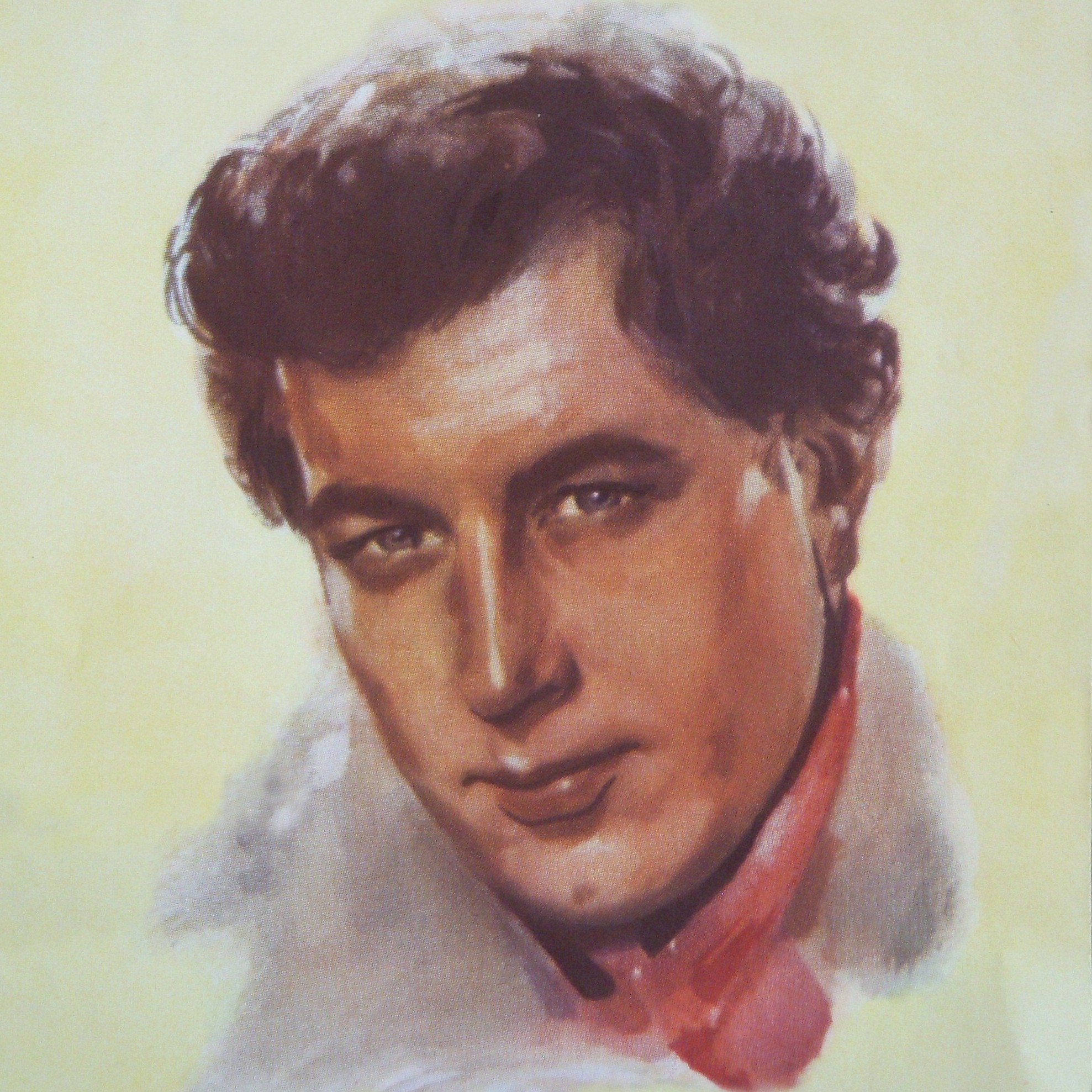
- Born: Hans-Jörg Hellmuth Felmy; 31 January 1931; Berlin, Germany
- Died: 24 August 2007 (aged 76); Eching, Germany
- Occupation: Actor
- Years active: 1957–1995
- Family: Hellmuth Felmy (father)

Hans-Jörg Hellmuth Felmy (31 January 1931 – 24 August 2007), known as Hansjörg Felmy, was a German actor. He was best known for his role as investigator Heinz Haferkamp on the long-running television police drama Tatort (1974–80).

== Early life ==
The son of Luftwaffe general and convicted war criminal Hellmuth Felmy (1885-1965), he was born in Berlin in 1931 and raised in Braunschweig with his two older brothers. His family was of French Huguenot descent.

After an argument with a teacher, Felmy left gymnasium without graduating and worked as a tradesman while taking acting lessons. After a stint with a touring theatre company, he joined the Staatstheater Braunschweig in 1949.

== Career ==
Felmy appeared in 50 films and television shows between 1957 and 1995. Films like Der Stern von Afrika and Wir Wunderkinder made him a well-known actor in the late 1950s. He starred in the film The Marriage of Mr. Mississippi (1961), which was entered into the 11th Berlin International Film Festival. In an international film appearance, he played the Stasi officer Heinrich Gerhard in Alfred Hitchcock's Torn Curtain (1966) who hunts the leading characters played by Julie Andrews and Paul Newman.

Felmy portrayed Essen police investigator Heinz Haferkamp on the popular long-running police procedural Tatort, from 1974 to 1980.

Felmy also did German-language dubbing, including for Jack Nicholson, Steve McQueen, Roy Scheider, Franco Nero, Jean Gabin, and Michael Caine.

== Death ==
In his last years he suffered from osteoporosis. He died in Eching near Munich in 2007.

== Selected filmography ==
- Der Stern von Afrika (1957) - Robert Franke
- Haie und kleine Fische (1957) - Teichmann
- The Heart of St. Pauli (1957) - Hein Jensen
- The Copper (1958) - Harry Dennert
- Heart Without Mercy (1958) - Ulrich Rombach
- The Muzzle (1958) - Georg Rabanus
- Wir Wunderkinder (1958) - Hans Boeckel
- Restless Night (1958) - Fedor Baranowski
- The Man Who Sold Himself (1959) - Niko Jost
- People in the Net (1959) - Klaus Martens
- The Forests Sing Forever (1959) - Tore Björndal
- The Buddenbrooks (1959) - Thomas Buddenbrook
- Ein Tag, der nie zu Ende geht (1959) - Robert Wissmann
- Die zornigen jungen Männer (1960) - Fred Ploetz
- Brainwashed (1960) - Hans Berger
- The Ambassador (1960) - Jan Möller
- Sacred Waters (1960) - Roman Blatter
- The Marriage of Mr. Mississippi (1961) - Graf Bodo von Überlohe-Zabernsee
- The Shadows Grow Longer (1961) - Max
- The Last Chapter (1961) - Daniel Utby
- Genosse Münchhausen (1962) - Mann mit Feuer (uncredited)
- The Happy Years of the Thorwalds (1962) - Peter Thorwald
- Station Six-Sahara (1963) - Martin
- The Pirates of the Mississippi (1963) - Sheriff James Lively
- The Hangman of London (1963) - John Hillier
- Murderer in the Fog (1964) - Kommissar Hauser
- The Monster of London City (1964) - Richard Sand
- The Seventh Victim (1964) - Peter Brooks
- When the Grapevines Bloom on the Danube (1965) - Frank Richter
- Torn Curtain (1966) - Heinrich Gerhard
- Flucht ohne Ausweg (1967, TV miniseries) - Bert Gregor
- The Body in the Thames (1971) - Inspector Craig
- Alexander Zwo (1972–1973, TV miniseries) - Klaus Müller
- Attempted Flight (1976) - Truck driver
- Tatort (1974–1980, TV series) - Heinz Haferkamp
- Overheard (1984, TV film) - Christopher Caulker
- Die Wilsheimer (1987, TV series) - Jean Ziegler
- Affäre Nachtfrost (1989, TV film) - Friedrich Seyfried
- Abenteuer Airport (1990, TV series) - Charly Kapitzki
- Hagedorns Tochter (1994, TV series) - Paul Hagedorn
