= Teufels Großmutter =

German television series

- DVD cover
- Directed by: Rob Herzet
- Starring: Brigitte Horney, Peter Pasetti, Loni von Friedl and Gerd Baltus
- Country of origin: Germany / Switzerland
- No. of seasons: 1
- No. of episodes: 12

Production
- Running time: c. 30 minutes

Original release
- Network: SF DRS, ORF, ZDF
- Release: 31 August 1985

Teufels Großmutter (Devil's Grandmother) is a twelve-part German/Swiss comedy television series which ran for one season in 1985 and 1986. Co-produced by SF DRS in Switzerland and ZDF in Germany, it was scripted by Justus Pfaue and directed by Rob Herzet, premiered in August 1985 on DRS and was subsequently broadcast on ORF and in 1986 on ZDF.

The series, particularly the performance of Horney as the grandmother, was acclaimed in newspapers such as the Frankfurter Allgemeine Zeitung, Bild am Sonntag and Hannoversche Allgemeine. Teufels Großmutter was issued on DVD in July 2007.

== Setting and cast ==
The series is about the worries and joys of the three-generation Teufel family in Berlin, who run a boatyard. The head of the family is grandmother Dorothea Teufel, played by Brigitte Horney. The male lead, Dorothea's ex-husband Friedrich-Heinrich, was played by Peter Pasetti. Loni von Friedl and Gerd Baltus also starred.

- Brigitte Horney as Dorothea Teufel
- Peter Pasetti as F.H.
- Matthias Hinze as Friedrich
- Natascha Rybakowski as Doris
- Gerd Baltus as Frank
- Loni von Friedl as Hetty
- Rijk de Gooyer as Hans Binnenbruck
- Horst Pinnow as Christian
- Hans-Jürgen Dittberner as Thomas Heindl
- Stefan Gossler as Stefan
- Manfred Lehmann as shipyard worker
- Andreas Mannkopff as Gisbert Schulz
- Maria Krasna as Anna Sitic
- Roswitha Schreiner as Nicole
- Gerhard Bös as Rüdiger
- Peter Döring as teacher Böhmler
- Nana Spier as Brigitte

== Broadcast history ==
Teufels Großmutter was broadcast on the German-language Swiss station DRS 1 starting on 31 August 1985, on ORF 1 in Austria starting on 22 November 1985, and on ZDF's early evening programme from 2 January until 20 March 1986. It was re-broadcast on ZDF in 1990 and on KiKa and ZDF in 1997.

== Episodes ==
12 episodes of the series were produced.

Nr.	Title	First broadcast	Summary
1	Die Sonntags-Oma	2 January 1986	Grandmother Dorothea Teufel lives with daughter Hetty, son-in-law Friedrich and Doris in an old villa. Though there have been family arguments since her divorce, things get heated when she drives a fast sports car and gives the family notice that they are to leave the premises.
2	Neue Mieter braucht das Haus	9 January 1986	Dorothea Teufel starts to feel lonely after evicting her family from the villa. She invites one of the workers, Stefan and his friends to move in. Problems eventually start to creep in.
3	Auf den Hund gekommen	16 January 1986	Dorothea's old accountant dies. A St. Bernard dog develops an attachment to Doris after encountering her at the cemetery. Doris sees to it that the dog goes back to the villa with them.
4	Spiel, Satz und Sieg	23 January 1986	A case of unrequited love for Friedrich who has fallen in love with a pretty girl named Nicole at the tennis club. Despite his attempts to woo her with flowers, she shows little interest in him until Dorothea intervenes.
5	Der Tanz ums Moped	30 January 1986	Dorothea insists that her grandson Friedrich learns how to tango dance. She enters him into a dancing contest which has prizes such as a moped. Unfortunately one of her own employees is a much superior dancer and shows up Friedrich
6	Schattenboxen	6 February 1986	Dorothea develops a fascination with Chinese culture, and starts learning Mandarin, eating and dressing like the Chinese. A letter confuses her and she becomes convinced that her grandson has been wronged.
7	In gewissen Krankheiten topfit	13 February 1986	Dorothea's ex-husband experiences back strain after winning a tennis match and tries to reconcile with Dorothea. Dorothea admits herself to hospital on the day when Thomas is due to take his clinical state examination.
8	Mast- und Schotbruch	20 February 1986	The 500th boat to be built at the Teufel shipyard turns out to be the fastest and most successful in the company's history. Grandson Friedrich capsizes the boat of a competitor by accident, and gets to know the other sailor. At the Kiel regatta, Friedrich finishes in second place.
9	Der hundertste Geburtstag	27 February 1986	Dorothea celebrates her birthday. An old friend, professor Ewald, visits and makes her ex-husband jealous, The celebrations don't end well.
10	Die Hamburger Krankheit	6 March 1986	Dorothea attempts to prevent her employees from developing the flu by giving them lemons, but unfortunately gets sick herself. Her ex-husband tries to take advantage of this and move back into the villa. He organizes a company outing to Hamburg, yet on the day of the excursion Dorothea is well again and he is in bed with the flu.
11	Wie soll das Kind heißen?	13 March 1986	The new boat at the family shipyard is nameless. Dorothea announces her retirement, which is met with resistance from the family. She interferes in the naming of the yacht and is active one foggy night in influencing its fate.
12	Glücklich restauriert	20 March 1986	The children and grandchildren insist that grandma and grandpa Teufel remarry. Preparing for the wedding turns out to be a cumbersome affair, and the wedding in Rio de Janeiro is postponed. Meanwhile, Dorothea and her ex-husband have some babysitting to do.

== Reception ==
The first episode of the series was watched by 8 million viewers on ZDF. The series, particularly Horney'sperformance, was well-received by the critics. Frankfurter Allgemeine Zeitung wrote that "Author and director took exact measure with their leading actress and gave her a role in which she can bring all her compassionate and whimsical abilities to full fruition." Bild am Sonntag described Horney's performance of Dorothea as "resolute". The Hannoversche Allgemeine wrote that it was "unconventional and endearing as one could wish for in a grandmother."

== See also ==
- List of German television series
