= The Moment to Kill =

1968 Spaghetti Western film

- Directed by: Giuliano Carmineo
- Screenplay by: Francesco Scardamaglia; Tito Carpi; Fabio Piccioni; Bruno Leder
- Produced by: Pier Ludovico Pavoni
- Starring: George Hilton; Walter Barnes; Horst Frank; Loni von Friedl
- Cinematography: Stelvio Massi
- Edited by: Ornella Micheli; Renato Cinquini
- Music by: Francesco de Masi
- Production companies: Terra-Filmkunst GmbH; Produzione Cinematografiche Europe
- Release date: 28 November 1968 (West Germany)
- Running time: 95 minutes
- Countries: West Germany; Italy

The Moment to Kill (Italian: Il momento di uccidere) is a 1968 Spaghetti Western film.

It was the first film entirely directed by Giuliano Carnimeo.

== Cast ==
- George Hilton: Lord
- Walt Barnes: Bull
- Loni von Friedl: Regina Forrester
- Horst Frank: Jason Forrester
- Rudolf Schündler: Thomas B. Warren
- Arturo Dominici: Innkeeper

== Release ==
The film was released in West Germany on 28 November 1968 as Django: Ein Sarg voll Blut ("Django: A Coffin Full of Blood").
