= Der Bastian =

1973 West German television series

- Directed by: Rudolf Jugert
- Starring: Horst Janson; Karin Anselm; Lina Carstens
- Country of origin: West Germany
- Original language: German
- No. of episodes: 13

Original release
- Release: 2 July – 24 September 1973

Der Bastian is a West German television series written by Barbara Noack, broadcast in 13 episodes in 1973 on ZDF.

== See also ==
- List of German television series
