= The Marriage of Mr. Mississippi =

1961 film

- Film poster
- Directed by: Kurt Hoffmann
- Written by: Kurt Hoffmann; Hans Schweikart
- Based on: The Marriage of Mr. Mississippi by Friedrich Dürrenmatt
- Produced by: Artur Brauner; Lazar Wechsler
- Starring: O.E. Hasse; Johanna von Koczian; Martin Held
- Cinematography: Sven Nykvist
- Edited by: Hermann Haller
- Music by: Hans-Martin Majewski
- Production companies: CCC Film; Praesens-Film
- Distributed by: UFA Film Hansa
- Release date: 24 June 1961
- Running time: 95 minutes
- Countries: West Germany; Switzerland
- Language: German

The Marriage of Mr. Mississippi (German: Die Ehe des Herrn Mississippi) is a 1961 Swiss-West German comedy film directed and co-written by Kurt Hoffmann and starring O.E. Hasse, Johanna von Koczian and Martin Held. It is based on the 1952 play of the same name by Friedrich Dürrenmatt. It was entered into the 11th Berlin International Film Festival. The film was shot at the Spandau Studios in Berlin, and on location in Zurich. The sets were designed by the art directors Hertha Hareiter and Otto Pischinger.

== Cast ==
- O.E. Hasse as Florestan Mississippi
- Johanna von Koczian as Anastasia
- Hansjörg Felmy as Graf Bodo von Überlohe-Zabernsee
- Martin Held as Frédéric René Saint-Claude
- Charles Régnier as Sir Thomas Jones - Justizminister
- Max Haufler as Van Bosch
- Ruedi Walter as McGoy
- Karl Lieffen as Santamaria
- Hanns Ernst Jäger as Schlender
- Edith Hancke as Lukretia
- Otto Graf as Ministerpräsident
- Tilo von Berlepsch as Außenminister
- Kunibert Gensichen as Informationsminister
- Herbert Weissbach as Finanzminister

== Bibliography ==
- Bock, Hans-Michael; Bergfelder, Tim, eds. (2009). The Concise Cinegraph: Encyclopaedia of German Cinema. Berghahn Books. ISBN 978-1-57181-655-9.
