= The Buddenbrooks (1959 film) =

1959 film

- Directed by: Alfred Weidenmann
- Written by: Thomas Mann (novel); Harald Braun; Jacob Geis; Erika Mann
- Produced by: Hans Abich; Eberhard Krause
- Starring: Liselotte Pulver; Hansjörg Felmy; Nadja Tiller
- Cinematography: Friedl Behn-Grund
- Edited by: Caspar van den Berg
- Music by: Werner Eisbrenner
- Production company: Filmaufbau
- Distributed by: Europa-Filmverleih
- Release dates: 11 November 1959 (Part I); 20 November 1959 (Part II)
- Running time: 99 minutes (Part I); 107 minutes (Part II)
- Country: West Germany
- Language: German

The Buddenbrooks (German: Buddenbrooks) is a 1959 West German drama film directed by Alfred Weidenmann and starring Liselotte Pulver, Hansjörg Felmy, Nadja Tiller. It was released in two parts. It is an adaptation of the 1901 novel of the same name by Thomas Mann.

The art director Robert Herlth designed the film's sets. It was filmed at the Wandsbek Studios. Location shooting took place in Hamburg and Lübeck.

== Main cast ==
- Hansjörg Felmy as Thomas Buddenbrook
- Liselotte Pulver as Antonia "Tony" Buddenbrook / Grünlich
- Nadja Tiller as Gerda Arnoldsen / Buddenbrook
- Hanns Lothar as Christian Buddenbrook
- Lil Dagover as Elisabeth Buddenbrook
- Werner Hinz as Jean Buddenbrook
- Rudolf Platte as Herr Wenzel
- Günther Lüders as Corle Smolt
- Robert Graf as Bendix Grünlich
- Wolfgang Wahl as Hermann Hagenström
- Gustav Knuth as Diederich Schwarzkopf
- Joseph Offenbach as Bankier Kesselmeyer
- Paul Hartmann as Pastor Kölling
- Hans Leibelt as Dr. Friedrich Grabow
- Carsta Löck as Ida Jungmann
- Ellen Roedler as Anna
- Hela Gruel as Sesemi Weichbrodt
- Hans Paetsch as Arnoldsen
- Horst Janson as Morten Schwarzkopf
- Fritz Schmiedel as Sigismund Gosch
- Karl Ludwig Lindt as Friedrich Wilhelm Marcus
- Frank Freytag as Sievert Tiburtius
- Gustl Halenke as Clara Buddenbrook
- Helga Feddersen as Clothilde Buddenbrook

== Bibliography ==
- Geoffrey Nowell-Smith. The Oxford History of World Cinema. Oxford University Press, 1997.
