= Jonny Saves Nebrador =

1953 film directed by Rudolf Jugert

- Directed by: Rudolf Jugert
- Written by: Karl Lerbs (novel); Werner Jörg Lüddecke; Heinz Pauck; Per Schwenzen; Hans Tannert
- Produced by: Heinrich Jonen
- Starring: Hans Albers; Margot Hielscher; Peter Pasetti; Ferdinand Anton
- Cinematography: Hans Schneeberger
- Edited by: Friedel Buckow
- Music by: Willy Dehmel; Werner Eisbrenner
- Production companies: Bavaria Film; Meteor-Film
- Distributed by: Allianz Filmverleih
- Release date: 24 November 1953
- Running time: 96 minutes
- Country: West Germany
- Language: German

Jonny Saves Nebrador (German: Jonny rettet Nebrador) is a 1953 West German adventure film directed by Rudolf Jugert and starring Hans Albers, Margot Hielscher and Peter Pasetti. The film is set in South America, but was shot in Ancona and Rimini, Italy. It was made by Bavaria Film at the company's Munich Studios. The film's sets were designed by the art directors Paul Markwitz and Fritz Maurischat.

== Cast ==
- Hans Albers as Jonny / General Oronta
- Margot Hielscher as Marina
- Peter Pasetti as Lt. Col. Dacano
- Ferdinand Anton as Lt. Articos
- Trude Hesterberg as Madame Dubouche
- Linda Hardt as Rosita
- Al Hoosmann as Totti
- Franz Muxeneder as Paco
- Kurt E. Ludwig as Carlo
- Fritz Benscher as Rubino
- Rudolf Vogel as Major Souza
- Horst Loska as Maracas
- Hans Bergmann as Rastano
- Wolfgang Molander as Captain Tolly
- Karl-Heinz Peters as Major Vinaigle
- Ernst Rotmund as President Dacapo
- Meloani
- Walter Wehner
- Viktor Afritsch
- Johannes Buzalski
- Otto Friebel
- Oliver Hassencamp
- Franz Koch
- Hans Schulz
- Jürgen Krumwiede
- Bum Krüger
- Fritz Lafontaine
- Kurt Lang
- Ernst Legal
- F. Neubert
- Panos Papadopulos
- Abdullah Schächly
- Alfons Teuber
- Bobby Todd
- Karl von Malachowsky

== See also ==
- The President (1928)
- The Magnificent Fraud (1939)
- I'm the Capataz (1951)
- Moon over Parador (1988)

== Bibliography ==
- Bock, Hans-Michael; Bergfelder, Tim, eds. (2009). The Concise Cinegraph: Encyclopaedia of German Cinema. New York: Berghahn Books. ISBN 978-1-57181-655-9.
- Fenner, Angelica (2011). Race Under Reconstruction in German Cinema: Robert Stemmle's Toxi. Toronto: University of Toronto Press. ISBN 978-1-4426-4008-5.
