= The Shadows Grow Longer =

1961 film

- Film poster
- Directed by: Ladislao Vajda
- Written by: István Békeffy; Heinz Pauck; Ladislao Vajda
- Produced by: Artur Brauner; Lazar Wechsler
- Starring: Barbara Rütting; Luise Ullrich; Hansjörg Felmy; Fred Tanner; Loni von Friedl
- Cinematography: Heinrich Gartner
- Edited by: Hermann Haller
- Music by: Robert Blum
- Production companies: Praesens-Film; CCC Film
- Distributed by: Columbia Film
- Release date: 1961
- Running time: 91 minutes
- Countries: Switzerland; West Germany
- Language: German

The Shadows Grow Longer (German: Die Schatten werden länger) is a 1961 Swiss-West German drama film directed by Ladislao Vajda. The film follows a former prostitute working at a home for girls who kills her former pimp after he tries to blackmail her. Loni von Friedl won the Preis der Deutschen Filmkritik and a Filmband in Gold for her performance, and the film was later shown at the Little Carnegie Playhouse in New York and at the 59th Solothurner Filmtage in 2024.

== Synopsis ==
The film follows a former prostitute who works at a home for girls. When her former pimp reappears and tries to blackmail her, she kills him.

== Main cast ==
The cast includes:

- Barbara Rütting as Christa Andres
- Luise Ullrich as Frau Diethelm
- Hansjörg Felmy as Max
- Fred Tanner as Dr. Borner
- Loni von Friedl as Erika Schöner

== Production ==
The film was shot in Zurich and at the CCC-Studios in Berlin-Spandau. Its sets were designed by Max Röthlisberger and Wilhelm Vorwerg.

== Reception ==
=== Awards ===
Loni von Friedl won the Preis der Deutschen Filmkritik in 1961 and received a Filmband in Gold at the Bundesfilmpreis in 1962.

=== Critical response ===
Filmdienst wrote that the film’s overly contrived story prevented it from convincingly conveying its sympathetic intentions toward vulnerable young people.

Solothurner Filmtage described the film as combining elements of an educational film with crime motifs and noted that it dealt with the prostitution and blackmail of young women at a time when prostitution was rarely discussed publicly.

The New York Times described the film as a respectable but plodding drama and concluded that it remained “pensive rather than penetrating.” The review also singled out Barbara Rütting’s performance and said the film was strongest in scenes showing the young inmates in rebellion.

== Later screenings ==
The film was shown at the Little Carnegie Playhouse in New York in June 1962 and was later screened at the 59th Solothurner Filmtage in 2024.

== See also ==
- List of submissions to the 34th Academy Awards for Best Foreign Language Film
- List of Swiss submissions for the Academy Award for Best Foreign Language Film
