= The Beautiful Adventure (1959 film) =

1959 film

- Directed by: Kurt Hoffmann
- Written by: Günter Neumann; Heinz Pauck
- Based on: Family Album by Antonia Ridge
- Produced by: Georg Witt
- Starring: Liselotte Pulver; Robert Graf; Bruni Löbel
- Cinematography: Günther Anders
- Edited by: Hilwa von Boro
- Music by: Franz Grothe
- Production company: Georg Witt-Film
- Distributed by: Constantin Film
- Release date: 29 September 1959
- Running time: 102 minutes
- Country: West Germany
- Language: German

The Beautiful Adventure (German: Das schöne Abenteuer) is a 1959 West German comedy film directed by Kurt Hoffmann and starring Liselotte Pulver, Robert Graf and Bruni Löbel. It was shot at the Bavaria Studios in Munich with location shooting in Dover, Nîmes, Saint-Étienne. The film's sets were designed by the art director Robert Herlth. It is adapted from the 1953 novel Family Album by the British writer Antonia Ridge.

== Synopsis ==
Dorothee Durand, an English schoolteacher, travels to Nîmes in Southern France to learn more about her French roots. While searching for her remaining relatives she meets and falls in love Marius, who runs a small boarding house.

== Cast ==
- Liselotte Pulver as Dorothee Durand
- Robert Graf as Marius Bridot
- Bruni Löbel as Françoise
- Eva Maria Meineke as Cathérine
- Oliver Grimm as Pierre Bridot
- Heinrich Schweiger as César
- Horst Tappert as Frécon
- Edith Teichmann as Angelique
- Paul Esser as Olivon
- Alexander Hunzinger as Labise
- Karl Lieffen as Fotograf Fortuné Tallon
- Heinz-Leo Fischer as Pinatel
- Ernst Brasch as Esperandier
- Ralf Wolter as Taschendieb
- Karl Hanft as Gendarm Bombeau
- Max Wittmann
- Rudolf Rhomberg as Jules Tardy
- Otto Storr as Pfarrer
- Marie Ferron as Haushälterin des Pfarrers
- Edith Schollwer as Mutter von César
- Hans Clarin as Busfahrer Polyte
- Klaus Havenstein as Busfahrer Mapeaux
- Hans Baur as Schaffner
- Walter Karl Gussmann as Auskunftsbeamter #2
- Lisa Helwig as Nonne im Zug
- Klaus W. Krause as Auskunftsbeamter #1
- Henry Lorenzen as Feuerwerker
- Helmut Oeser as Vincent

== Bibliography ==
- Hans-Michael Bock and Tim Bergfelder. The Concise Cinegraph: An Encyclopedia of German Cinema. Berghahn Books, 2009.
