= Two Among Millions =

- Directed by: Victor Vicas; Wieland Liebske
- Written by: Gerd Oelschlegel
- Produced by: Hardy Krüger; Georg Richter
- Starring: Hardy Krüger; Loni von Friedl; Walter Giller
- Cinematography: Heinz Hölscher
- Edited by: Klaus Dudenhöfer
- Music by: Franz Grothe
- Production company: UFA Film Hansa
- Distributed by: UFA Film Hansa
- Release date: 12 October 1961
- Running time: 96 minutes
- Country: West Germany
- Language: German
- Budget: $500,000

Two Among Millions (German: Zwei unter Millionen) is a 1961 West German drama film directed by Victor Vicas and starring Hardy Krüger, Loni von Friedl and Joseph Offenbach.

The film's sets were designed by the art directors Hans Auffenberg and Albrecht Hennings.

== Cast ==
- Hardy Krüger as Karl
- Loni von Friedl as Christine
- Walter Giller as Paulchen
- Joseph Offenbach as Lohmann
- Ilse Fürstenberg as Frau Lohmann
- Fritz Tillmann as Petersen
- Ludwig Linkmann as Bienert
- Harry Gillmann as Wilhelm
- Reinhold Bernt as Schliemke
- Lore Hartling as Helga
- Maly Delschaft
- Claus Tinney
- Traute Bengen
- Henriette Gonnermann
- Oscar Sabo
- Manfred Meurer
- Siegfried Dornbusch
- Heinz G. Diesing
- Tobias Pegel
- Hellmut Grube
- Fred Woywode

== Bibliography ==
- Bock, Hans-Michael & Bergfelder, Tim. The Concise Cinegraph: Encyclopaedia of German Cinema. Berghahn Books, 2009.
