= The Angel Who Pawned Her Harp (1959 film) =

1959 film

- Directed by: Kurt Hoffmann
- Written by: Charles Terrot (novel); Günter Neumann; Heinz Pauck
- Produced by: Georg Witt
- Starring: Nana Osten; Henry Vahl; Ullrich Haupt
- Cinematography: Sven Nykvist
- Edited by: Hilwa von Boro
- Music by: Franz Grothe
- Production company: Georg Witt-Film
- Distributed by: Constantin Film
- Release date: 12 February 1959
- Running time: 97 minutes
- Country: West Germany
- Language: German

The Angel Who Pawned Her Harp (German: Der Engel, der seine Harfe versetzte) is a 1959 West German fantasy comedy film directed by Kurt Hoffmann and starring Nana Osten, Henry Vahl and Ullrich Haupt. It was shot at the Bavaria Studios in Munich. The film is based on the novel of the same title by Charles Terrot which had previously been made into a British film in 1954.

== Plot ==
An angel arrives on Earth tasked with improving the world.

The main task involves conning a pawnbroker (who specialises in old musical instruments) into believing her harp is valuable. This is set up by organising a "chance meeting" in a pub and convincing him, through a man talking, that he could obtain a valuable harp.

== Cast ==
- Nana Osten as Der Engel ("the angel")
- Henry Vahl as Joshua Webmann
- Ullrich Haupt as Hinrich Prigge
- Matthias Fuchs as Klaas Henning
- Tatjana Sais as Frau Henning
- Dunja Movar as Lissy Haverkamp
- Eva Vaitl as Frau Haverkamp
- Hans Cossy as Herr Haverkamp
- Gisela Peltzer as Frau Petersen
- Lina Carstens as Frau Feuerhake
- Monika John as Elise
- Horst Tappert as Herr Parker
- Alexander Hunzinger as Schätzer
- Marie Ferron
- Carl Simon
- Wolfgang Dohnberg
- Peter Tost
- Michael Paryla
- Gabriele Adam
- Henry Lorenzen
- Lisa Helwig
- Fritz Wepper

== See also ==
- List of films about angels

== Bibliography ==
- Bock, Hans-Michael & Bergfelder, Tim. The Concise CineGraph. Encyclopedia of German Cinema. Berghahn Books, 2009.
