= Loni von Friedl =

Austrian actress (born 1943)

- Born: 24 July 1943 (age 82); Vienna, Nazi Germany (now Austria)
- Occupation: Actress
- Years active: 1951–present
- Spouse(s): Götz George (1966-1976); Jürgen Schmidt (1995-2004) (his death)

Loni von Friedl (born 24 July 1943) is an Austrian film and television actress. She began as a child actress in the early 1950s, before graduating to mature roles during the following decade. The daughter of cinematographer Fritz von Friedl, she also had an actor brother. Her nephew is actor Christoph von Friedl.

She was married to actor Götz George from 1966 to 1976. She later married Jürgen Schmidt.

== Selected filmography ==
- The Merry Farmer (1951), as Annamirl (child)
- Maria Theresa (1951), as Marie Antoinette (child)
- When the Bells Sound Clearly (1959), as Hanna
- My Schoolfriend (1960), as Rosi
- Zu jung für die Liebe? (1961), as Katja
- The Shadows Grow Longer (1961), as Erika Schöner
- Two Among Millions (1961), as Christine
- The Happy Years of the Thorwalds (1962), as Brigitte von Tienitz
- Love Has to Be Learned (1963), as Margot Zimmermann
- The Spendthrift (1964), as Amalie
- Frühstück mit dem Tod (1964), as Vickie Paul
- The Blue Max (1966), as Elfi Heidemann
- The Blood of Fu Manchu (1968), as Celeste
- The Moment to Kill (1968), as Regina Forrester
- Doppelgänger (1969), as Lise Hartman
- Diamantendetektiv Dick Donald (1971, TV series, 13 episodes), as Daisy Johnson
- Cats' Play (1983, TV film), as Ilona
- Bali (1984, TV film), as Martina Hillenbrink
- Ein Heim für Tiere (1985–1987, TV series, 19 episodes), as Dr. Ingrid Probst
- Teufels Großmutter (1986, TV series, 12 episodes), as Hetty Engelhardt
- Waldhaus (1987–1988, TV series, 18 episodes), as Ilse Kurawski
- Peter und Paul (1994–1998, TV series, 7 episodes), as Baroness von Rabenberg
- Gegen den Strom (1997, TV film), as Angelika
- Valley of the Shadows (1999, TV film), as Karin Heller
- Monsoon Baby (2014, TV film), as Greta

== Bibliography ==
- Bock, Hans-Michael & Bergfelder, Tim. The Concise CineGraph. Encyclopedia of German Cinema. Berghahn Books, 2009.
