= Selma Urfer =

Swiss author, translator and actress

- Born: 30 March 1928; Bern, Switzerland
- Died: 2 May 2013 (aged 85); Munich, Germany

Selma Urfer (born 30 March 1928 in Bern, Switzerland; died 2 May 2013 in Munich) was a Swiss author, translator and actress. She graduated from the Zurich School of Drama in 1948. In addition to acting and studio recordings, she published numerous short stories, radio and TV plays, translations from French/English and two novels. She joined the Gruppe Olten in 1970. She was married to the German actor Robert Graf, had three children, including German film director Dominik Graf, and lived in Munich.

== Awards ==
- 1984 - Preis des Kurzgeschichtenwettbewerbs des Schweizerischen Beobachters
- 1985 - Literaturpreis des C. Bertelsmann Verlags
- 1987 - Literaturpreis des Kantons Bern

== Works ==
- Damals. Dort., C. Bertelsmann Verlag, Munich 1986 ISBN 3-570-07874-4
- Skizzen aus Grandson, Les Editions d'Autrefois, Grandson 1988
- Liebe in Coppet. Eine Erinnerung an Madame de Staël, Nymphenburger Verlagsanstalt, 1992 ISBN 3-485-00646-7
- Der braune Eisbär, Schweiz. Jugendschriftenwerk, 2005
- Peter Pan in Kensington Gardens, translation into German from the novel The Little White Bird (1902) by James Matthew Barrie, English and German parallel texts, with notes and afterword, Scaneg Verlag, Munich 2008 ISBN 978-3-89235-120-7
