= Victor and Victoria (1957 film) =

1957 film directed by Karl Anton

- German film poster
- German: Viktor und Viktoria
- Directed by: Karl Anton
- Written by: Reinhold Schünzel (1933 screenplay); Curt J. Braun
- Produced by: Waldemar Frank
- Starring: Johanna von Koczian; Georg Thomalla; Johannes Heesters
- Cinematography: Willy Winterstein
- Edited by: Annemarie Rokoss
- Music by: Heino Gaze
- Production company: Central-Europa Film
- Distributed by: Prisma Film
- Release date: 16 April 1957
- Running time: 107 minutes
- Country: West Germany
- Language: German

Victor and Victoria (German: Viktor und Viktoria) is a 1957 German musical comedy film directed by Karl Anton and starring Johanna von Koczian, Georg Thomalla and Johannes Heesters. A woman gains success on the stage by pretending to be a female impersonator. It is a remake of the 1933 film Victor and Victoria, which had starred Renate Müller. The film's sets were designed by Emil Hasler and Walter Kutz. In 1982, Metro-Goldwyn-Mayer released Victor/Victoria, an English-language remake by Blake Edwards of the 1933 film.

== Cast ==
- Johanna von Koczian as Erika Lohr
- Georg Thomalla as Viktor Hempel
- Johannes Heesters as Jean Perrot
- Annie Cordy as Titine
- Boy Gobert as Lacoste
- Carola Höhn as Marquise de Sevigné
- Werner Finck as Hinz
- Franz-Otto Krüger as detective commissioner
- Kurt Pratsch-Kaufmann as Wurstmaxe
- Gerd Frickhöffer as hotel doorman
- Stanislav Ledinek as host in the beer bar
- Waltraut Runze as Pressedame
- Kurt Vespermann as Intendant
- Henry Lorenzen as Tier-Dresseur
- Erich Poremski
- Valérie Camille as dancer
- Alicia Márquez as dancer
- Jack del Rio as dancer
- Les Romano's Brothers as dancer
- Die Vier Sunnies as singer
- Das Cornell-Trio as singer
- Ernie Bieler as singer
- Wolfgang Gruner as hairdresser
- Hilla Höfer as waitress
- Edhilt Rochell as secretary
- Ralf Wolter as hairdresser
