= Wir Wunderkinder =

1958 film

- Cover of the Illustrierte Filmbühne showing Hansjörg Felmy and Robert Graf.
- Directed by: Kurt Hoffmann
- Written by: Günter Neumann; Heinz Pauck based on a novel by Hugo Hartung
- Produced by: Hans Abich; Rolf Thiele
- Starring: Hansjörg Felmy; Robert Graf
- Cinematography: Richard Angst
- Edited by: Hilwa von Boro
- Music by: Franz Grothe
- Production company: Filmaufbau GmbH
- Distributed by: Constantin Film Verleih
- Release date: 1958
- Running time: 107 minutes
- Country: West Germany
- Language: German

Wir Wunderkinder is a 1958 West German comedy film directed by Kurt Hoffmann and starring Hansjörg Felmy and Robert Graf. The black-and-white film is also known in English as Aren't We Wonderful?.

== Plot ==
The film recounts the lives of two schoolmates, Hans Boeckel and Bruno Tiches from the fictional town of Neustadt an der Nitze, against the backdrop of German history in the first half of the 20th century. It is told by a narrator (Wolfgang Neuss) who is supported by Wolfgang Müller with music. Through their presentation and discussion of events in the film these two provide a running commentary on political and social issues between the acts of the movie and link them together with explanations and songs.

On the anniversary of the Völkerschlacht in 1913, the two boys, Hans and Bruno, rush a balloon that is supposed to travel to Leipzig and carry a laurel wreath to Emperor William II. Hans is caught and punished, but Bruno stows away, causing the balloon to crash far from its intended goal. However, he tells a tall tale of his trip to Leipzig and his meeting with the Kaiser, for which he is congratulated and awarded a gift. This marks a trend for the future: While hard-working Hans has to work struggle for everything in life, carefree Bruno is lucky and seems to succeed without even trying.

The action fast-forwards to the post-World War I period when Bruno works at the 'Bankhaus Stein & Co.', having befriended his schoolmate, the son and heir of the bank, Siegfried Stein. He also deals on the black market. Some years later, during the inflation of 1923, Hans has to sell newspapers to pay his way through university in Munich. Bruno calls on him and asks for some food and money, having quit his job as a "slave of the Jewish capital" to join up with the Bewegung of Adolf Hitler. Hans falls in love with fellow student Vera von Lieven. However, she becomes ill and has to go to Switzerland for her health. Hans finishes his PhD and becomes a journalist with a Munich newspaper. Bruno joins the NSDAP and makes a career as a Nazi.

During a Fastnacht party in 1932, Hans meets Kirsten, a student from Denmark. After the Nazis seize power, Siegfried Stein visits Hans and asks him for help. Stein wants to know whether he should flee across the border immediately or wait for a passport. Hans promises to talk to Bruno, who is now in a position of authority in the party and lives in a large house confiscated from a Jewish doctor. However, he finds that Bruno is quite unwilling to help a Jew.

Vera contacts Hans and asks him to meet her in Verona. He travels there but before they can talk, she learns that her father, an academic, had to flee Nazi Germany, leaving behind all his possessions. She decides to join her father in France and she and Hans part for good. When Hans returns to Munich, Kirsten has gone back to Denmark. The Nazis have taken over the newspaper and he loses his job when he fails to greet the visiting Bruno in the proper fashion. Asked for help, Bruno is willing to oblige, but only on condition that Hans joins the party. Hans refuses.

In 1939, Kirsten returns to Munich where Hans works as an assistant at a bookstore. They go to Denmark together and get married, but when war starts, Hans has to return to Germany and she accompanies him. The final scene from the Nazi years shows Bruno in 1944 giving a "holdout" speech.

With the war over and released from POW detention, Hans returns to Neustadt. He, Kirsten and their two children live in quite poor conditions while Bruno, who has changed his surname to "Anders", makes a comfortable living from his black market activities. The lot of the Boeckel family only improves when Siegfried Stein, now a member of the occupation forces, gets Hans a job at a newspaper in Munich.

Finally, in the period known as the Wirtschaftswunder, Bruno has risen to the rank of Generaldirektor (head of company) while Hans works as a journalist. When he writes a critical article, referencing Bruno's Nazi past, Bruno visits Boeckel's boss and threatens to organise an advertising boycott of the paper unless Hans retracts the story. Hans refuses and Bruno storms out. Finally abandoned by his luck, he falls into an empty elevator shaft.

At Bruno's funeral, the attending political and economic leaders are shown to have previously been involved with the Nazi party as well, and while they vow to "continue onwards in his spirit", the film closes with a zoom on the letters ENDE of graveyard inscription, "Wir mahnen die Lebenden" ("We admonish the living/the survivors").

== Cast ==
- Hansjörg Felmy as Hans Boeckel
- Robert Graf as Bruno Tiches
- Johanna von Koczian as Kirsten Hansen
- Wera Frydtberg as Vera von Lieven
- Elisabeth Flickenschildt as Mary Meisegeier
- Ingrid Pan as Doddy Meisegeier
- Ingrid van Bergen as Evelyne Meisegeier
- Jürgen Goslar as Schally Meisegeier
- Tatjana Sais as Mrs. Häflingen
- Liesl Karlstadt as Mrs. Roselieb
- Michl Lang as Anton Roselieb
- Wolfgang Neuss as Narrator
- Wolfgang Müller as Hugo
- Peter Lühr as Chief editor Vogel
- Hans Leibelt as Mr. Lüttenjense
- Lina Carstens as Mrs. Vette
- Pinkas Braun as Siegfried Stein
- Ernst Schlott as Dr. Sinsberg
- Ralf Wolter as Bathroom waiter
- Horst Tappert as Teacher Schindler
- Franz Fröhlich as Fruit salesman
- Ludwig Schmid-Wildy as Old man
- Karl Lieffen as Obmann Wehackel
- Otto Brüggemann as Dr. Engler
- Helmuth Rudolph as Baron von Lieven
- Karen Marie Løwert as Mrs. Hansen
- Emil Hass Christensen as Mr. Hansen
- Michael Burk as Cabaret artist
- Rainer Penkert as Cabaret artist
- Fritz Korn as Cabaret artist
- Lisa Helwig

== Production ==
This satire is based on the novel Wir Wunderkinder by Hugo Hartung, first published in 1957. Günter Neumann and Heinz Pauck wrote the script. Kurt Hoffmann directed it and it was produced by Hans Abich and Rolf Thiele.

Principal cinematography took place from 13 May 1958 through June 1958. Interiors were shot at the Bavaria Studios. On location filming was in Munich, Denmark, Verona (Piazza dei Signori, Roman Theatre) and Sicily.

== Release ==
The film premiered on 28 October 1958 at the Sendlinger Tor-Lichtspiele in Munich.

== Reception ==
The film received numerous awards. Most notably, it won the Golden Globe for Best International Picture in 1960. It also received the "Prädikat: Wertvoll" from the Filmbewertungsstelle in 1958 and won both the Great Price at the International Film Festival at Acapulco and a Golden Medal at the 1st Moscow International Film Festival in 1959.

Robert Graf won the Filmband in Silber as Best Newcomer at the Deutscher Filmpreis in 1959 for his role as Bruno. The Verband der Deutschen Filmkritik (Association of German Film Critics) awarded its prize for Best Actress to Johanna von Koczian for her role in this movie.

More recently, Wir Wunderkinder was selected by academics and critics as one of the "Most Important German Movies", for which a total of 132 films from the period 1895 to 2008 have been chosen.

The Lexikon des internationalen Films calls the film "an imaginative, cabaret-critical-satirical cross-section of four decades of German history", but "a typical movie of the Adenauer era with a basically positive attitude despite all the criticism".
