= Heinz Pauck =

German screenwriter

- Born: 18 March 1904; Bielefeld, North Rhine-Westphalia, German Empire
- Died: 26 July 1986 (aged 88); Reinbek, Schleswig-Holstein, West Germany
- Occupation: Writer
- Years active: 1938-1985 (film & TV)

Heinz Pauck (1904–1986) was a German screenwriter.

== Selected filmography ==
- The Man Who Wanted to Live Twice (1950)
- Fanfares of Love (1951)
- Captain Bay-Bay (1953)
- Jonny Saves Nebrador (1953)
- My Children and I (1955)
- The Girl from Flanders (1956)
- The Zurich Engagement (1957)
- Lemke's Widow (1957)
- The Spessart Inn (1958)
- Wir Wunderkinder (1958)
- The Beautiful Adventure (1959)
- The Angel Who Pawned Her Harp (1959)
- The Haunted Castle (1960)
- Stage Fright (1960)
- The Shadows Grow Longer (1961)
- Schweik's Awkward Years (1964)
- Praetorius (1965)

== Bibliography ==
- Gerd Gemünden. A Foreign Affair: Billy Wilder's American Films. Berghahn Books, 2008.
