= Abenteuer Airport =

- Starring: Hansjörg Felmy
- Country of origin: Germany

Original release
- Release: September 9 – November 19, 1990

Abenteuer Airport is a German television series broadcast in 1990. It was an airport adventure series; 12 episodes were produced.
