= Unter weißen Segeln =

German television series

- Written by: Knut Boeser, Thomas Hernadi, Gabriele Herzog, Wolfgang Limmer, Hartmann Schmige, Alexander Schuller, Stefan Kruppa
- Starring: Peter Weck, Helmut Zierl, Fritz Wepper, Christine Neubauer, Horst Janson
- Country of origin: Germany
- No. of episodes: 6

Production
- Running time: 90 minutes

Original release
- Network: Das Erste
- Release: 5 March 2004 – 2006

Unter weißen Segeln (Under White Sails) is a German six-part television film drama series which was broadcast on ARD's Das Erste in 2004-2006. The series takes place on the sailing cruise ships of the shipping company Star Clippers.

== Plot ==
The films tell travel stories, with the main setting of the action being the three sailing cruise ships Star Flyer, Star Clipper and Royal Clipper, but also includes their escapades stopping ashore in the Caribbean, the Mediterranean and Asia during their cruises. The plots revolve around love, suffering, happiness and the longings of the passengers. The captain and the cruise manager are significantly involved in the plot.

The regular cast includes Peter Weck, Helmut Zierl and Fritz Wepper in the supporting roles and Christine Neubauer in a main role as cruise manager Marlene, who stops working on the Royal Clipper for the farewell performance and hands over the position of cruise manager to Gerit Kling, alias Saskia. From episode three onwards, the role of captain Bernd Jensen is played by Horst Janson.

== See also ==
- List of German television series
