= Robert Graf (actor) =

German actor (1923–1966)

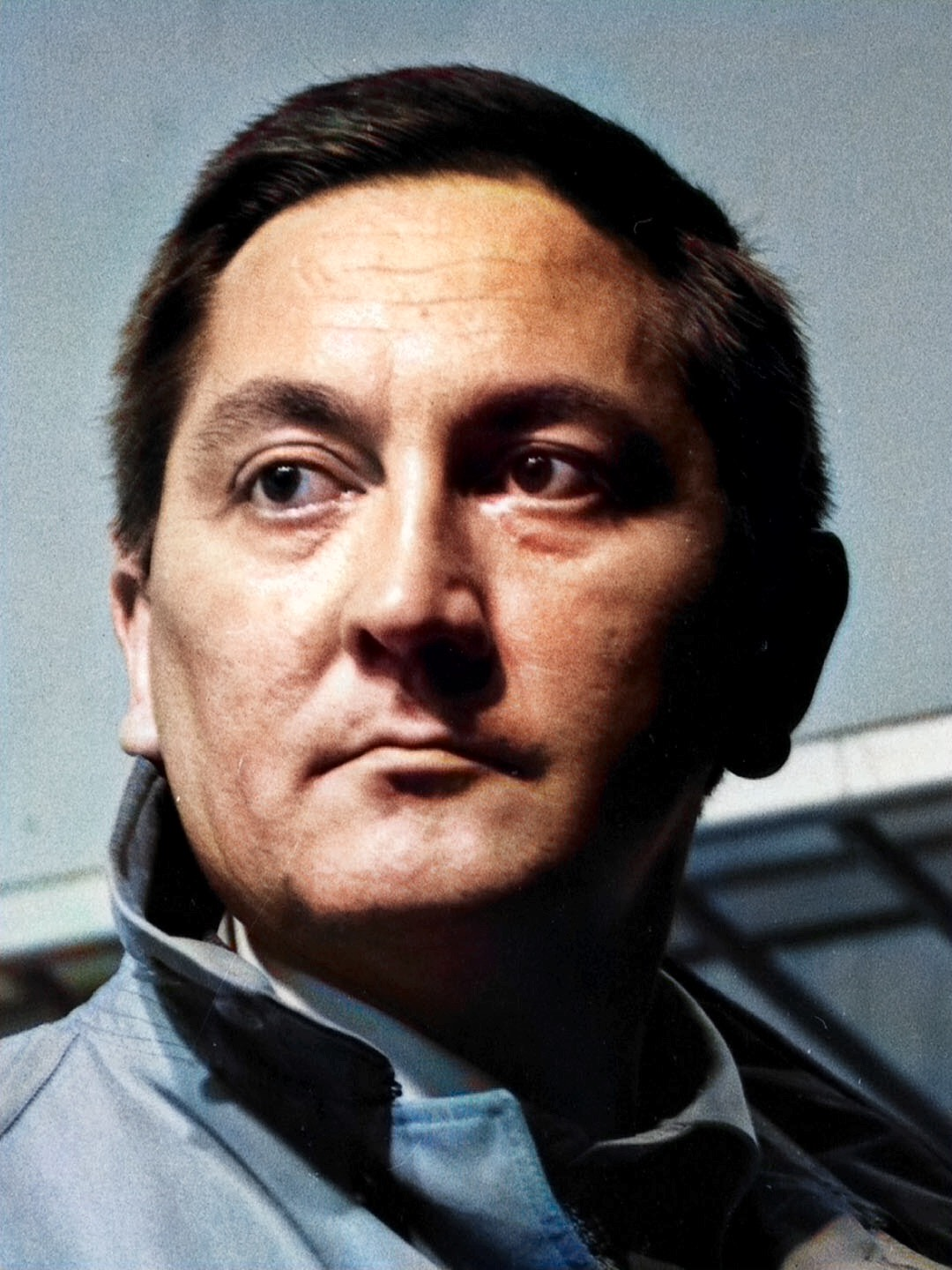
- Robert Graf
- Born: 18 November 1923; Witten, Germany
- Died: 4 February 1966 (aged 42); Munich, Bavaria, West Germany
- Occupation: Actor
- Years active: 1952–1966

Robert Graf (November 18, 1923 – February 4, 1966) was a German actor who played the role of Werner, "The Ferret" in the 1963 movie The Great Escape. Graf was born in Witten, Germany in 1923.

In 1942, after completing his Abitur, he was conscripted into the Wehrmacht and sent to the Eastern Front. He was wounded in 1944, and assigned to war production duties in Munich, where he began his study of theatre. In 1952, Graf married the actress Selma Urfer and had three children. He was the father of the director Dominik Graf. Robert Graf died of cancer in Munich in 1966 at age 42.

== Filmography ==
Year	Title	Role	Notes
1952	Illusion in a Minor Key	Franz	
1957	Jonas	Jonas	
1957	El Hakim	Abubakr	
1958	Wir Wunderkinder	Bruno Tiches	
1959	And That on Monday Morning	Herbert Acker	
1959	The Beautiful Adventure	Marius Bridot	
1959	The Buddenbrooks	Bendix Grünlich	
1960	The Woman by the Dark Window	Thomas Melchior	
1960	Sweetheart of the Gods	Dr. Hertel	
1960	My Schoolfriend	Dr. Lerch	
1960	Hauptmann, deine Sterne	Emil Kowalek	
1961	The Forger of London	Basil Hale	
1961	Murder Party	Dr. Horn	
1962	Wenn beide schuldig werden	Dr. Hassfeld	
1962	The Happy Years of the Thorwalds	Ernst Bieber	
1963	The Great Escape	Werner "The Ferret"	
1963	12 Angry Men	Juror 8	TV movie
1963	Zwei Whisky und ein Sofa	Dr. Wiesmer / Ping	
1964	A Mission for Mr. Dodd	Toni	
1964	Frühstück mit dem Tod	Hal Young, Second Prosecutor	
1964	Condemned to Sin	Der Vertreter	
1965	Klaus Fuchs – Geschichte eines Atomverrats	Klaus Fuchs	TV movie
1965	Halløj i himmelsengen	Mr. Noël, teacher	
1966	Face of a Hero	David Poole	TV movie
