= Heart Without Mercy =

1958 film directed by Viktor Tourjansky

- Directed by: Viktor Tourjansky
- Written by: Hans-Ulrich Horster (novel); Hans Jacoby
- Produced by: Gyula Trebitsch
- Starring: Barbara Rütting; Hansjörg Felmy; Werner Hinz
- Cinematography: Günther Anders
- Edited by: Alice Ludwig
- Music by: Herbert Windt
- Production company: Real Film
- Distributed by: Neue Filmverleih
- Release date: 24 April 1958
- Running time: 95 minutes
- Country: West Germany
- Language: German

Heart Without Mercy (German: Herz ohne Gnade) is a 1958 West German crime film directed by Viktor Tourjansky and starring Barbara Rütting, Hansjörg Felmy and Werner Hinz.

It was made at the Wandsbek Studios in Hamburg. The film's sets were designed by the art director Albrecht Becker and Herbert Kirchhoff.

== Cast ==
- Barbara Rütting as Anja Wegener
- Hansjörg Felmy as Ulrich Rombach
- Werner Hinz as Friedrich Rombach
- Hans Nielsen as Dr. Waagemann
- Margarete Haagen as Mimi Busse
- Corny Collins as Hilde Wegener
- Günter Pfitzmann as Dr. Knoll
- Josef Dahmen as Kriminalrat Dorn
- Lotte Brackebusch as Frau Wegener
- Elly Burgmer
- Wilhelm Walter
- Manfred Kunst
- Kai Fischer as Christa
- Henry Vahl as Gärtner Volmer

== Bibliography ==
- Hake, Sabine. German National Cinema. Routledge, 2002.
