= The Happy Years of the Thorwalds =

- Directed by: Wolfgang Staudte; John Olden
- Written by: J.B. Priestley (play); Answald Krüger; Maria Matray; Christian Schürhoff
- Produced by: Werner Ludwig; Alexander Rakosi
- Starring: Elisabeth Bergner; Hansjörg Felmy; Dietmar Schönherr
- Cinematography: Siegfried Hold
- Edited by: Alice Ludwig
- Music by: Siegfried Franz
- Production company: Allgemeine Film
- Distributed by: Europa-Filmverleih
- Release date: 16 November 1962
- Running time: 88 minutes
- Country: West Germany
- Language: German

The Happy Years of the Thorwalds (German: Die glücklichen Jahre der Thorwalds) is a 1962 West German drama film directed by Wolfgang Staudte and John Olden, starring Elisabeth Bergner, Hansjörg Felmy and Dietmar Schönherr. It is based on J.B. Priestley's 1937 play Time and the Conways, with the setting shifted from Britain to Germany. It portrays two family gatherings - the first in 1913 during the German Empire before the First World War and the second in 1932 in the dying days of the Weimar Republic before the Nazi takeover.

It was shot at the Wandsbek Studios in Hamburg and on location in the city. The film's sets were designed by the art directors Mathias Matthies and Ellen Schmidt.

== Cast ==
- Elisabeth Bergner as Frau Thorwald
- Hansjörg Felmy as Peter Thorwald
- Dietmar Schönherr as Martin Thorwald
- Brigitte Grothum as Helga Thorwald
- Elfriede Irrall as Erika Thorwald
- Johanna Matz as Maria Thorwald
- Wega Jahnke as Kathrin Thorwald
- Loni von Friedl as Brigitte von Tienitz
- Robert Graf as Ernst Bieber
- Dieter Borsche as Dr. Schaub
- Walter Grüters
- Walter Klam
- Günther Schramm
- Liselotte Willführ

== Bibliography ==
- Bock, Hans-Michael & Bergfelder, Tim. The Concise CineGraph. Encyclopedia of German Cinema. Berghahn Books, 2009.
