= Matthias Hinze =

German actor (1969–2007)

Matthias Hinze (7 February 1969 in Berlin – 13 April 2007 in Berlin) was a German actor who specialized in dubbing.

== Filmography ==
- 1984: Eine Klasse für sich
- 1985: Teufels Großmutter as Friedrich
- 1988: Nordlichter
- 1988: War and Remembrance
- 1992: Gute Zeiten, schlechte Zeiten as Peter Becker

== Notable voice roles ==
- 15 productions as Matt Damon
- 4 productions as James Marsden
- Dragon Ball Z: Wrath of the Dragon as Tapion
- Meine Liebe as Orpherus
- Phantom Quest Corp. as Higashi Narita (Ep. 3)
- Spirit of Wonder as Jim Floyd
- Spirit of Wonder Scientific Boys Club as Jim Floyd
- Tenjho Tenge as Shin Natsume
- X as Seishirou Sakurazuka
