= Horst Janson (actor) =

German actor (1935–2025)

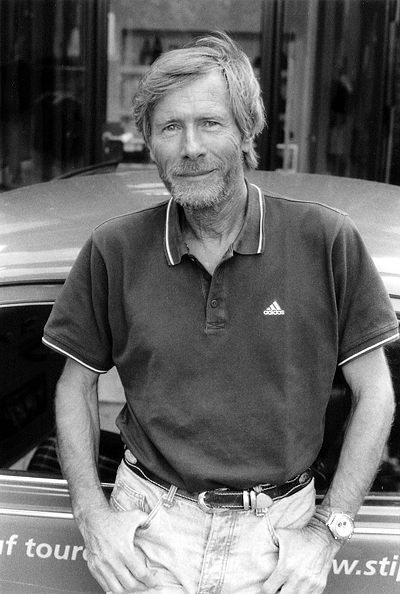
- Janson in 2003
- Born: 4 October 1935; Mainz-Kastel, Hesse, Germany
- Died: 28 January 2025 (aged 89); Munich, Bavaria, Germany
- Occupation: Actor
- Spouse(s): Monika Lundi (m. 1973; div. 1976) Hella Ruthardt (m. 1982)
- Children: 2
- Awards: Bravo Otto; Bambi Award

Horst Janson (German pronunciation: [hɔʁst ˈjɑn.zoːn]; 4 October 1935 – 28 January 2025) was a German actor. To English-speaking audiences, he is best remembered for roles as captains in the films Escape from East Berlin (1962), a German submarine captain in Murphy's War (1971), the lead role of Captain Kronos in the swash-buckling Hammer Film production Captain Kronos – Vampire Hunter (1974), the German ship captain-lieutenant in the German West African-set war adventure film Shout at the Devil (1976), and a German captain in the war film Breakthrough (1979). On German television he appeared in many films and series, including as the title character in 13 episodes of Der Bastian (1973), and more than 200 episodes of Sesamstraße (Sesame Street) between 1980 and 1985.

== Life and career ==
Janson was born in Mainz-Kastel on 4 October 1935, the son of a civil servant. He grew up mostly in Wiesbaden, but temporarily in Bad Soden during World War II. He was already interested in acting at school. He took acting lessons and made his stage debut at the Staatstheater Wiesbaden.

Janson made his cinematic debut in 1959 in The Buddenbrooks, and appeared in Helmut Käutner's film Das Glas Wasser (A Glass of Water) in 1960, alongside Gustaf Gründgens and Liselotte Pulver. He also appeared in films such as Ruf der Wildgänse (The Cry of the Wild Geese, 1961), Das Riesenrad (1961), and Robert Siodmak's Escape from East Berlin (1962), opposite Don Murray, Christine Kaufmann and Werner Klemperer.

In 1971, Janson starred in Murphy's War opposite Peter O'Toole and Philippe Noiret. In 1974 he portrayed the title character in the Hammer Film production Captain Kronos – Vampire Hunter. In 1976, he starred as the German ship captain-lieutenant Ernst Kyller of the SMS Blücher in the German West African-set British war adventure film Shout at the Devil, opposite Lee Marvin and Roger Moore. In 1979, he starred as a German captain in the war film Breakthrough, opposite Richard Burton, Robert Mitchum and Rod Steiger. He appeared in many other feature films, including spaghetti westerns with Franco Nero, Eli Wallach and other international productions with Tony Curtis, Anthony Perkins, Charles Bronson, and Robert Wagner.

On television, he had a breakthrough in the series Salto Mortale, from 1969 to 1971. He appeared in the title role of the series Der Bastian from 1973, becoming popular in the role of a young student, despite filming at age 37. Janson appeared in numerous other works for both film and television, including more than 200 episodes of Sesamstraße (the German version of Sesame Street (1980–1985)), and Zwei Schlitzohren in Antalya (1991–1994).

Janson also appeared in many German, French, Spanish, Italian, and English-language TV films including Der Bunker (1992), Il segno della scimmia (The Sign of the Ape, 1997), and Freundinnen fűr Immer (2003). He played Captain Bernd Jensen in the ARD series Unter weißen Segeln (In White Sails).

=== Personal life ===
Janson was married to the actress Monika Lundi, with whom he worked, from 1973 to 1976. He was married to his second wife, Hella, from 1982 for over 40 years; they lived in Grünwald near Munich and had two daughters.

Janson suffered a stroke in June 2024. A second stroke in August led to a fall and was diagnosed only in hospital. Janson died from related complications in Munich on 19 January 2025, at the age of 89.

== Filmography ==
=== Film ===
Janson's film appearances include:

- The Buddenbrooks (1959, part 1), as Morten Schwarzkopf
- …und noch frech dazu! (1959), as Fred
- A Glass of Water (1960), as Arthur Masham
- Der Teufel hat gut lachen (1960), as Jürgen Lüdecke
- Das Riesenrad (1961), as Harry
- Ruf der Wildgänse (The Cry of the Wild Geese, 1961), as Sven Sandbo
- Das Mädchen und der Staatsanwalt (1962), as Thomas Ungermann
- Escape from East Berlin (1962), as Günther Jurgens
- Die Liebenden von Florenz (1966, TV film), as Martin
- A Woman Needs Loving (1969), as George
- Spielst du mit schrägen Vögeln (If You Play with Crazy Birds, 1969), as Alfred
- Der Kerl liebt mich – und das soll ich glauben? (That Guy Loves Me, Am I Supposed to Believe That?, 1969), as Rainer Forst
- You Can't Win 'Em All (1970), as Wollen
- The McKenzie Break (1970), as Lt. Neuchl
- Murphy's War (1971), as Lauchs
- Hilfe, die Verwandten kommen (1971), as Helmut
- Der Kapitän (The Captain, 1971), as Jörg Neher
- Long Live Your Death (1971), as Sheriff Randall
- Life Is Tough, Eh Providence? (1972), as Sheriff
- Zinksärge für die Goldjungen (Battle of the Godfathers, 1973), as Erik
- Ein toter Taucher nimmt kein Gold (No Gold for a Dead Diver, 1974), as Hans Faerber
- Captain Kronos – Vampire Hunter (1974), as Captain Kronos
- Die Zwillinge vom Immenhof (The Twins from Immenhof, 1973), as Alexander Arkens
- Frühling auf dem Immenhof (Spring in Immenhof, 1974), as Alexander Arkens
- Shout at the Devil (1976), as Kyller
- Taxi 4012 (1976, TV film), as Stefan Kamensky
- Breakthrough (1979), as Capt. Berger
- Wie hätten Sie's denn gern? (How Would You Like to Have It?, 1983), as Jack
- To Catch a King (1984, TV film), as General Schellenberg
- Danger – Keine Zeit zum Sterben (No Time to Die, 1984), as Martin Forster
- The Last Days of Patton (1986, TV film), as Baron von Wangenheim
- Tierärztin Christine (Veterinarian Christine, 1993, TV film), as Thomas Nemes
- Il segno della scimmia (1997, TV film), as Professor Simak
- Der Bunker – Eine todsichere Falle (The Last Bomb, 1999, TV film), as General Kilian
- Liebe, Tod und viele Kalorien (2001, TV film), as Kurt Markmann
- Freundinnen für immer (2003, TV film), as Fred Jakob
- Momella – Eine Farm in Afrika (2007, TV film), as Graf Rantzau
- Dunkelrot (2008, Short), as Erich Krahl
- Schlaflos (2009, TV film), as Herr Sagmeister
- Böseckendorf – Die Nacht, in der ein Dorf verschwand (The Night a Village Vanished, 2009, TV film), as Pfarrer
- Eines Tages... (2010), as Jakob Filzmeyer
- Flaschendrehen (2011, TV film), as Hansen Senior
- Fliegen lernen (2012, TV film)
- Destruction of Silence (2013, Short), as Philipp Schmidt
- Das Privileg / Die Auserwählten (2021), as Opa

=== Television ===
Janson's appearances in TV series, miniseries & shorts include:

- Das Kriminalmuseum (1 episode, 1967), as Peter Schmelz
- ITV Play of the Week (1 episode, 1967), as Franz Muller
- The Root of All Evil? (1 episode, 1968), as Max Huber
- Salto mortale (18 episodes, 1969–1971), as Sascha Doria
- Upstairs, Downstairs (1 episode, A Suitable Marriage, 1971), as Baron Klaus von Rimmer
- George (1 episode, 1972), as Max Steiger Jr.
- Der Bastian (13 episodes, 1973), as Bastian Guthmann
- Härte 10 (5 episodes, 1974–1975), as Piet van Straaten
- Sesamstraße (more than 200 episodes, 1980–1983 + 1000th episode 1984)
- Zwei Schlitzohren in Antalya (20 episodes, 1991–1994), as Thomas Parler
- Unter weißen Segeln (4 episodes, 2005–2006), as Bernd Jensen

== Awards ==
- 1973: Prize of the paper Sunday Mail in the category best actor for his role in Christopher Fry's English television play The Best of Enemies
- 1973: Bravo Otto
- 1974: Bambi Award 1974
