= Ullrich Haupt (actor, born 1915) =

German actor (1915–1991)

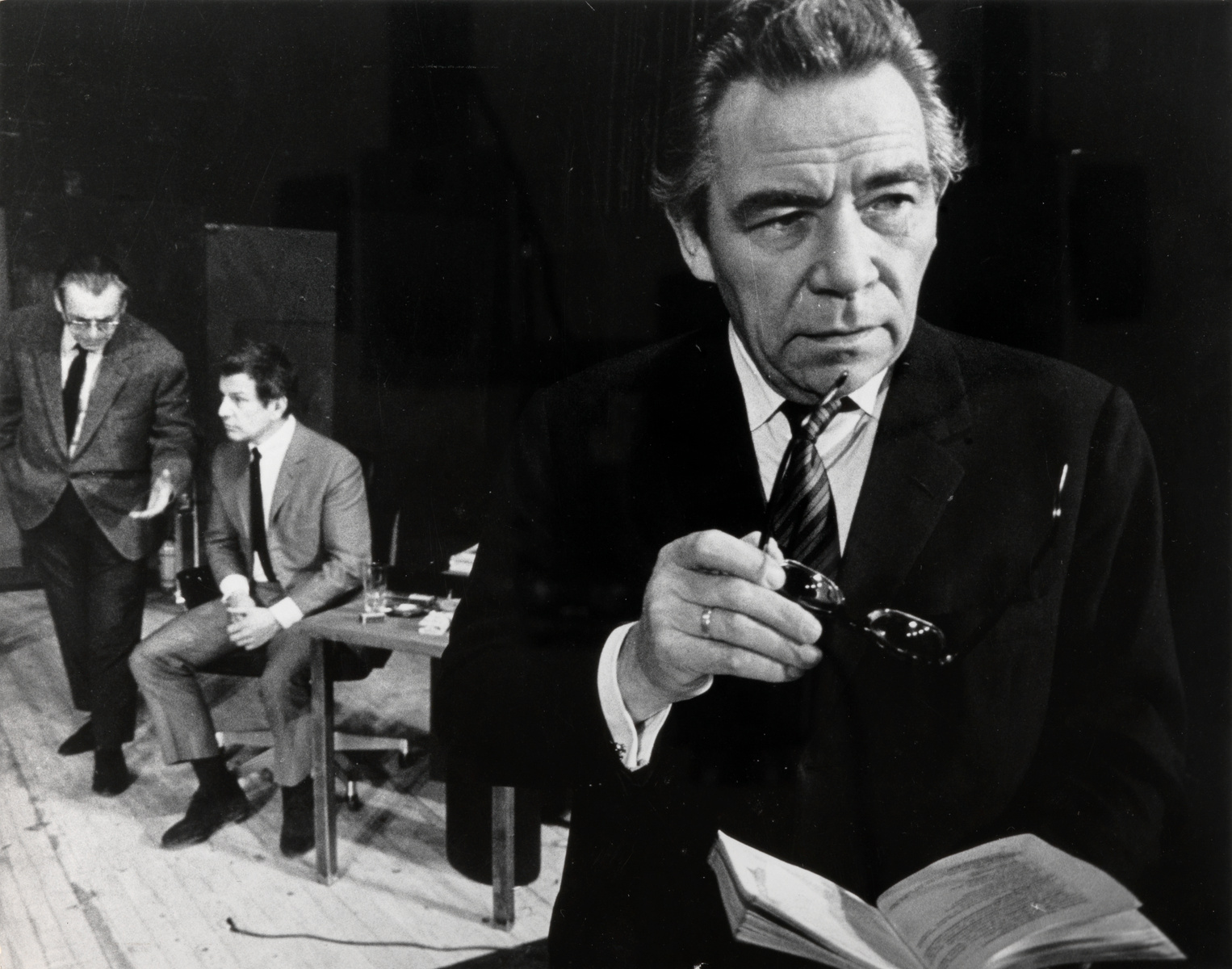
- Haupt (in background, middle) in 1968
- Born: 10 October 1915; Chicago, Illinois, United States
- Died: 22 November 1991 (aged 76); Munich, Bavaria, Germany
- Occupation: Film actor
- Years active: 1941–1991
- Spouse: Beatrice Norden (m. 1962)
- Parents: Ullrich Haupt (1887–1931) (father); Anna Maria Beaumes (maiden) (mother)

Ullrich Carl Haupt (October 15, 1915 – November 22, 1991) was an American-born German actor. His father, also named Ullrich Haupt, was a German actor who worked in Hollywood films, but he returned to Germany following his father's death in 1931.

== Career ==
=== United States ===
Ulrich Carl Haupt was born in Chicago to Ullrich Haupt (1887–1931) and Anna Maria Beaumes (maiden), both actors. He spent his early childhood in the United States. Although he grew up speaking English and his German later required some reacquisition, he became a notable actor within German-language theatre. Before turning to acting, Haupt worked in Los Angeles as a painter's assistant and initially intended to become a visual artist.

==== Father's fatal accident ====
When Ullrich, Jr., was 15, his father, Ullrich Haupt, Sr. – after completing a role as Colonel von Axt in Ronald Colman's 1931 film, The Unholy Garden, with seven other people, including himself (Ullrich Carl Haupt, Jr.) and his 8-year-old brother, Hans Haupt – went on a deer hunting trip in the San Rafael Mountains. His father died of an accidental gunshot wound August 5, 1931, at 8:50 pm in a remote area, at Davy Brown's cabin – about six miles from Figueroa Mountain, and approximately 50 miles north of Santa Barbara.

According to reports, Haupt's chauffeur, Carl Anderson, was unloading his 32.20 rifle when his glove caught the trigger, causing the firearm to discharge. The round struck Haupt in the elbow and severed an artery. Ullrich, Jr., with a guide from another hunting party, rode on horseback roughly fifteen miles to Santa Ynez to summon help. He returned at midnight to Davy Brown's cabin with a physician, Henry Gustaf Hanze, M.D. (né Henry Gustaf Hanze; 1901–1952), of Solvang, but Ullrich, Sr., had died at 8:50 pm of internal hemorrhage. Hanze himself had been injured en route when his horse fell, breaking two ribs. The horse was not injured.

Their home had been in Inglewood at 221 North Cedar Avenue.

=== Germany ===
In 1932, Ullrich, Jr., traveled to Berlin to study painting at the United State Schools for Fine and Applied Arts (Vereinigte Staatsschulen für freie und angewandte Kunst). His career direction shifted after attending a performance of Goethe's Faust, which inspired him to pursue acting instead.

In 1936, Haupt was accepted to the State Drama School in Danzig (Staatliche Schauspielschule Danzig), where he began his formal theatrical training in the final years before World War II. He made early stage appearances in Munich at the Bavarian State Theatre (Bayerisches Staatsschauspiel, including the Residence Theatre) around 1940, and soon afterward joined the company directed by Gustaf Gründgens in Berlin.

Haupt’s early stage roles included youthful heroic characters such as Karl Moor in Friedrich Schiller's The Robbers, Leander in Franz Grillparzer's Des Meeres und der Liebe Wellen (The Waves of Love), and Leopold in Geschwister ("Brother and Sister"). Over time, his repertoire expanded to include comedy, and during the war years he also worked in film. By the end of World War II he was already well established and continued appearing in films into the mid-1950s.

Haupt's stage career extended over several decades, during which he was noted for his unaffected style and seemingly ageless stage presence. He became associated with the Neue Theater, where he was regarded as one of its formative ensemble members. In 1951 he returned to Düsseldorf, and in 1954 he joined the founding ensemble of a new stage in Hamburg.

Beginning in 1959, Haupt also worked as a director. His productions included Marcel Pagnol's Der goldene Anker (Fanny, the second play of the Marseille Trilogy, Marseille being a city in Southern France) (Note: In French, the play is titled Fanny after its protagonist, and much of the action takes place in the Bar de la Marine on the Marseille waterfront. In German-speaking theatre, however, the title "Fanny" did not carry the same neutral tone and could sound unintentionally informal or humorous as a stand-alone play title. Likewise, the original bar name "Bar de la Marine" was not retained in translation, as it did not read idiomatically in German and lacked the familiar cultural resonance of a German tavern name. For these reasons, German productions renamed the setting as Zum Goldenen Anker (The Golden Anchor), and adopted this as the play's title — a choice in keeping with mid-20th-century German theatrical practice, which favored locale-based titles with recognizable symbolic imagery over personal names alone.) and Monsieur Topaze. At the Schauspielhaus Zürich in 1968, he appeared as Klummann in Max Frisch's Biography, staged by Leopold Lindtberg. He later returned to Hamburg's Thalia Theater, where he both acted and directed, including in Harold Pinter's The Caretaker, a role demanding considerable psychological nuance.

Haupt continued to work in theatre into his later years, maintaining his reputation for clarity of performance and versatility of stage presence.

== Selected filmography ==
- The Comedians (1941) – Komödiant bei der Neuberin
- Alarmstufe V (1941) – Leutnant der Feuerschutzpolizei
- Dreaming (1944) – Johannes Brahms
- Kamerad Hedwig (1945) – Erich König
- Der Scheiterhaufen (1945)
- Die Kreuzlschreiber (1950) – Bauernbursche (uncredited)
- The Angel Who Pawned Her Harp (1959) – Hinrich Prigge
- Homesick for St. Pauli (1963) – Bob Hartau
- Die Rechnung – eiskalt serviert (1966) – George Davis
- Spy Today, Die Tomorrow (1967) – General Forman
- Wegen Reichtum geschlossen (1968)
- Madam Kitty (1976) – Professor
- Derrick (Kein schöner Sonntag, 1976; Lissas Vater, 1978) – Herr Schirmer / Georg Hassler
- Target (1985) – Older Agent
- Escape from Sobibor (1987) – Sgt. Wolf
- Spider's Web (1989) – Baron von Köckwitz

== Involvement in the 1949 Axis Sally trial ==
In 1949, Haupt appeared as a witness for the United States government in the treason trial at U.S. District Court in Washington, D.C. against Mildred Gillars (1900–1988), widely known as "Axis Sally." Gillars, an American broadcaster employed by German radio during World War II, was charged with making propaganda broadcasts intended to undermine the morale of Allied troops, aimed at discouraging the Normandy invasion, which was launched on June 6, 1944.

Haupt testified that he and Gillars had both performed in a 1944 radio drama produced in Berlin and broadcast to American service members. The program, sometimes referred to in later accounts as the “Vision of Invasion” broadcast, depicted an American mother learning of her son’s death during a hypothetical Allied landing in Western Europe. According to Haupt’s testimony, Gillars voiced the role of the mother, while he played the son.

Haupt told the court that he had been living and working as an actor in Germany during the war, and that he had been compelled to perform in state-produced broadcasts and theatrical productions. He stated that refusal to participate could have resulted in reprisals against himself and his family. Haupt also testified that although his mother was Jewish, he did not identify publicly as Jewish during the war and denied association with the Nazi Party.

Ullrich, living in New York City at the time of the trial, provided testimony primarily to establish corroboration of Gillars' participation in broadcasts cited by the prosecution.

At the time of the trial, Haupt was performing a role supporting Elisabeth Bergner in Goethe's play, Iphigenie auf Tauris at the Barbizon Plaza Theater at 58th and 6th Avenue.

Note: Neither Ullrich nor his brother, Hans, were related to Herbert Hans Haupt.

== Bibliography ==
=== References ===
- Die Welt. Berlin.
1. Bergmann, Kathrin (30 October 1985). "Kultur" – "Mit Shakespeares Romeo fing alles an" ["It All Began with Shakespeare's Romeo"]. Vol. 44, no. 253. p. 23 (bottom right).
  1. Via Internet Archive (in German).
- Kansas City Star (The).
1. "Bullet Ends Career of Actor Schooled in Hardship – Ullrich, German Player Who Died of an Accidental Shooting in Hollywood, Began His American Life on the Stage Under Charles F. Horner". Vol. 51, no. 326. 9 August 1931. p. 10 (section A).
  1. Via Newspaper.com.
- Morning Press, (The). Santa Barbara.
1. "Glove Catches Trigger, Kills Actor – Corner's Jury to Hear Tale of Deer Hunt, Fatal for Ullrich Haupt, Today – Doctor Injured on Way – Solvang Physician Presses on to Aid After Falling Into Canyon, Breaking Ribs". Vol. 68, no. 310. 7 August 1931. p. 2 (section A).
  1. Via Newspaper.com.
- New York Times (The). ISSN 0362-4331.
1. "Ex-Actor Outlines 'Axis Sally' Role – Tell's Capital Jury He and She Took Part in Nazi Broadcast to Discourage Invasion". Vol. 98, no. 33247 (Late City ed.). February 2, 1949. p. 7.
  1. Pdf via TimesMachine (PDF).
  2. Permalink via TimesMachine.
- TheMasterKey (1 October 2009). "Ullrich Haupt". Scott Michael's Findadeath Forum. Archived from the original on 7 November 2025.
