= Arnulf Klett =

German mayor (1905–1974)

Arnulf Klett (8 April 1905 in Stuttgart, Kingdom of Württemberg, German Empire – 14 August 1974 on the Bühlerhöhe/Black Forest, Baden-Württemberg) was a German lawyer and politician. He was the first Lord Mayor of Stuttgart after the Second World War (from 1945 until his death in 1974) and has been the Lord mayor with the longest period in office of that city.

== Early life ==
After completing high school with an Abitur in 1923, he studied jurisprudence at the University of Tübingen, earning a Doctor of Law in 1928. From 1930, he worked as a lawyer in Stuttgart.

== Lord Mayor of Stuttgart ==
Having been at the least critical towards the Nazi regime and not belonging to any party, he was installed as Lord Mayor of Stuttgart by the French military administration after the war. In 1948, in the first free mayoral elections, he was confirmed in that office by a significant majority of the Stuttgart electorate. He won re-election into eight-year terms three times in 1956, 1964 and 1972 so that he stayed in office until his death in 1974, for a total of almost 30 years.

In 1948, he was the initiator of a city partnership between Stuttgart and St Helens, the first post-war twinning to take place between Britain and Germany.

In 1961, he was the initiator of a city partnership between Stuttgart and Strasbourg, as part of the improvement of the post-war Franco-German friendship.

Klett also initiated the re-building and major extension of public transport in post-war Stuttgart, most of the Stuttgart Stadtbahn system – one of the most extensive of such networks in Europe – was built up during his term.

== Role in reconstruction ==
His role in dealing with the reconstruction of the large portions of the city destroyed by the Allied bombing of Stuttgart in World War II was controversial, as in most cases he preferred and succeeded to completely demolish buildings that weren't completely damaged and to not rebuild them in the original style, so that not much of pre-war Stuttgart is left in the city's current architecture. The most prominent example of this was the demolition of the old Gothic Revival style town hall, that was replaced by a modern building, built 1953–1956.

== Honors ==
A subway passage, opened in 1976, leading from Königstraße to Stuttgart's main train station building (Stuttgart Hauptbahnhof) is named after Arnulf Klett as well as the square directly adjacent to the west of that train station.

== Bibliography ==
- Boehling, Rebecca L. (1996). A Question of Priorities: Democratic Reforms and Economic Recovery in Postwar Germany, Frankfurt, Munich and Stuttgart under US Occupation, 1945-1949. Berghahn Books. pp. 94–104.
