= Fritz Kuhn =

German politician (born 1955)

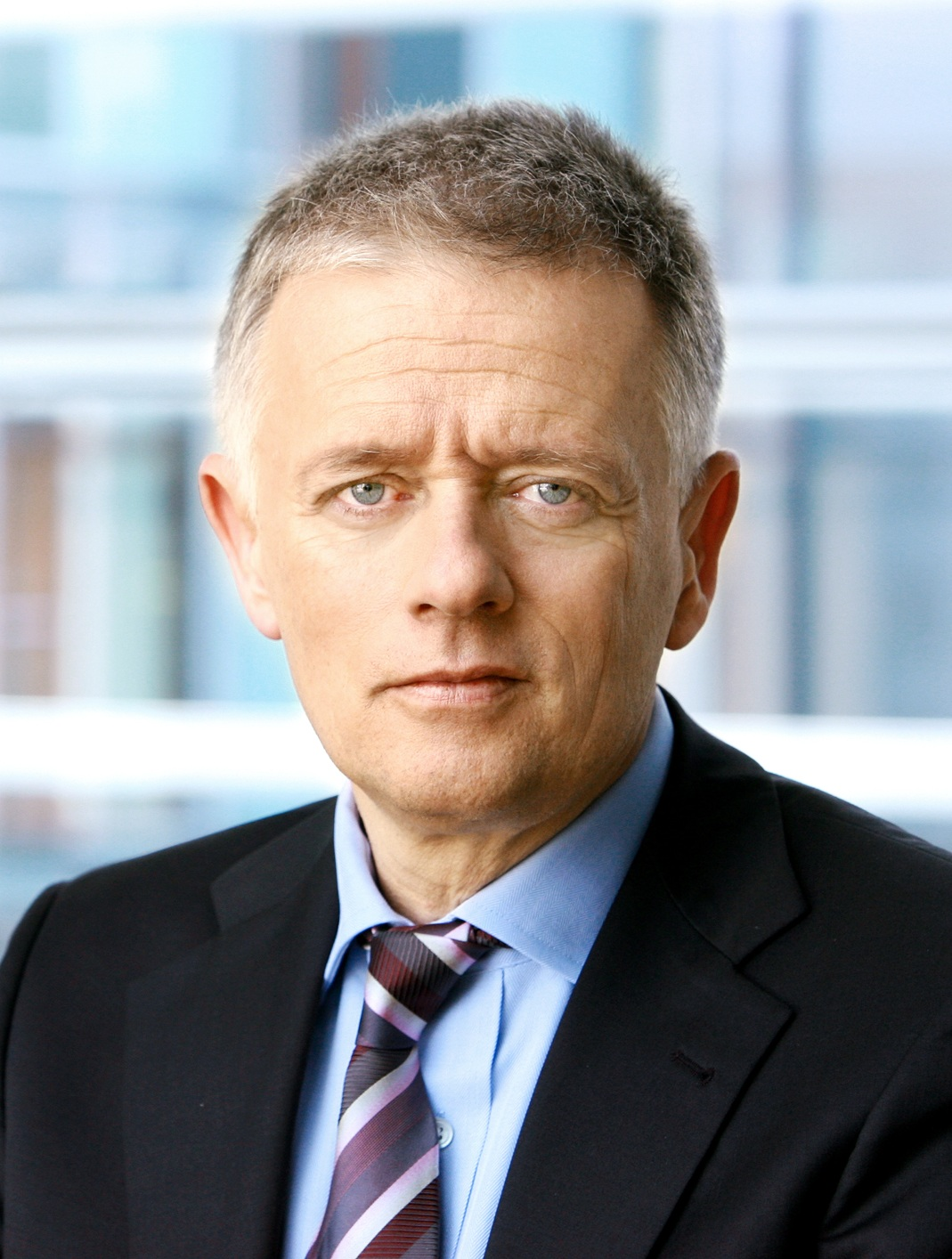
- Kuhn in 2006

Mayor of Stuttgart
- In office 7 January 2013 – 4 February 2021
- Preceded by: Wolfgang Schuster
- Succeeded by: Frank Nopper

Leader of the Alliance 90/The Greens in the Bundestag
- In office 18 October 2005 – 6 October 2009 Serving with Renate Künast
- Preceded by: Katrin Göring-Eckardt
- Succeeded by: Jürgen Trittin

Leader of the Alliance 90/The Greens
- In office 22 June 2002 – 7 December 2002 Serving with Renate Künast and Claudia Roth
- Preceded by: Gunda Röstel
- Succeeded by: Reinhard Bütikofer

Member of the Bundestag; from Baden-Württemberg
- In office 22 September 2002 – 7 January 2013
- Preceded by: Multi-member district
- Succeeded by: Susanne Kieckbusch
- Constituency: State list

Personal details
- Born: 29 June 1955 (age 71) Bad Mergentheim, West Germany
- Party: Alliance 90/The Greens
- Children: 2
- Education: LMU Munich; University of Tübingen

Fritz Kuhn (born 29 June 1955) is a German politician who served as Mayor of Stuttgart from 2012 until 2021. He was co-chairman of Alliance 90/The Greens, the German green party, in 2002 and its parliamentary group from 2002 to 2013.

== Early life and education ==
Fritz Kuhn was born in Bad Mergentheim (Baden-Württemberg) and grew up in Memmingen (Bayern), where he attended Bernhard Strigel grammar school. After his A-levels he studied German and philosophy at LMU Munich and the University of Tübingen, with a master's thesis in the field of linguistics.

== Political career ==
Kuhn was one of the founding members of the Green Party in the Federal Republic of Germany in 1980.

From 1981 to 1984 he worked as a research assistant at Augsburg university and as a consultant to the parliamentary party of the Greens in the state parliament (Landtag) of Baden-Württemberg (South-West Germany).

=== Member of the State Parliament in Baden-Württemberg ===
Kuhn became an MP and the leader of the parliamentary party of the Greens (Alliance 90/The Greens from 1993) in the Landtag of Baden-Württemberg, the state's legislature, in 1984, a position he held until 1988, and then later again from 1992 to 2000, having worked as a Professor of Linguistic Communication in the years in between.

Kuhn was one of the two federal chairpersons of Alliance 90/The Greens from 2000 to 2002, first together with Renate Künast, then with Claudia Roth. He resigned from that office in October 2002 after having been elected as a member of the Bundestag, the parliament of the Federal Republic of Germany; at the time, there was a rule in the Green Party that you could not be an MP and hold a party office at the same time.

=== Member of the German Parliament, 2002–2012 ===
Fritz Kuhn first became a member of the Bundestag in the 2002 federal elections. In the immediate aftermath of the elections, he was part of the Green Party's team in the negotiations with the Social Democrats on a coalition agreement for the second government under the leadership of Chancellor Gerhard Schröder.

In the Bundestag, Kuhn specialized in the fields of the economy (fighting for "a green market economy") and employment, and foreign policy. From 2002 until 2005, he served on the Committee on Foreign Affairs. Between 2005 and 2009, Kuhn was one of the two leaders of the Green parliamentary party (together with Renate Künast), from 2009 he served as deputy leader.

For the 2005 federal elections, Kuhn was the campaign manager of Alliance 90/The Greens. At the 2009 election, he unsuccessfully contested the single member constituency of Heidelberg.

Between 2007 and 2009, Kuhn was one of 32 members of the Second Commission on the modernization of the federal state (Föderalismuskommission II), which had been established to reform the division of powers between federal and state authorities in Germany.

=== Mayor of Stuttgart, 2012–2021 ===
On 21 October 2012 Kuhn was elected Lord Mayor of Stuttgart in Baden-Württemberg with 52.9% of the votes. His 8-year-term as Mayor (Oberbürgermeister) began in January 2013. Stuttgart has a population of about 600,000 and is capital city of the Federal State of Baden-Württemberg. Kuhn was the first candidate of the German Green party to win in a city of such importance.

Kuhn took over from Wolfgang Schuster, his predecessor, on 7 January 2013. In early 2020, he announced that he would not stand in the next elections but instead resign from active politics by the end of his second term later that year.

== Other activities ==
=== Corporate boards ===
- Landesbank Baden-Württemberg (LBBW), Ex-Officio Member of the Supervisory Board
- Stuttgart Airport, Deputy Chairman of the Supervisory Board
- Verkehrs- und Tarifverbund Stuttgart (VVS), Ex-Officio Chairman of the Supervisory Board
- Stadtwerke Stuttgart, Ex-Officio Chairman of the Supervisory Board

=== Non-profit organizations ===
- Heinrich Böll Foundation, Member of the Board
- Max Planck Institute for Medical Research, Member of the Board of Trustees
- Theaterhaus Stuttgart, Member of the Board of Trustees

== Personal life ==
Kuhn is married and has two sons.

Kuhn also supports the football club FC Bayern Munich.

== See also ==
- Dieter Salomon, the first Green party mayor of a German Großstadt (a large city)
