= The Marriage of Mr. Mississippi (play) =

- Original language: German
- Written by: Friedrich Dürrenmatt

Premiere
- Date: 26 March 1952
- Place: Munich, Germany

The Marriage of Mr. Mississippi (German: Die Ehe des Herrn Mississippi) is a play by the Swiss writer Friedrich Dürrenmatt. The play was written in 1950, but Dürrenmatt continued to revise it until 1980. It premiered on 26 March 1952 at the Munich Kammerspiele, directed by Hans Schweikart. It was then performed in Chile, Israel, and New York. The play was adapted into a 1961 film with the same title. The Iranian director and playwright Homayoun Ghanizadeh adapted the play in 2016 and staged the new production, Mississippi Dies Seated, at the Vahdat Hall in Tehran.

== See also ==
- Swiss literature
- 1952 in literature
