= Eching, Landshut =

Eching
- Municipality
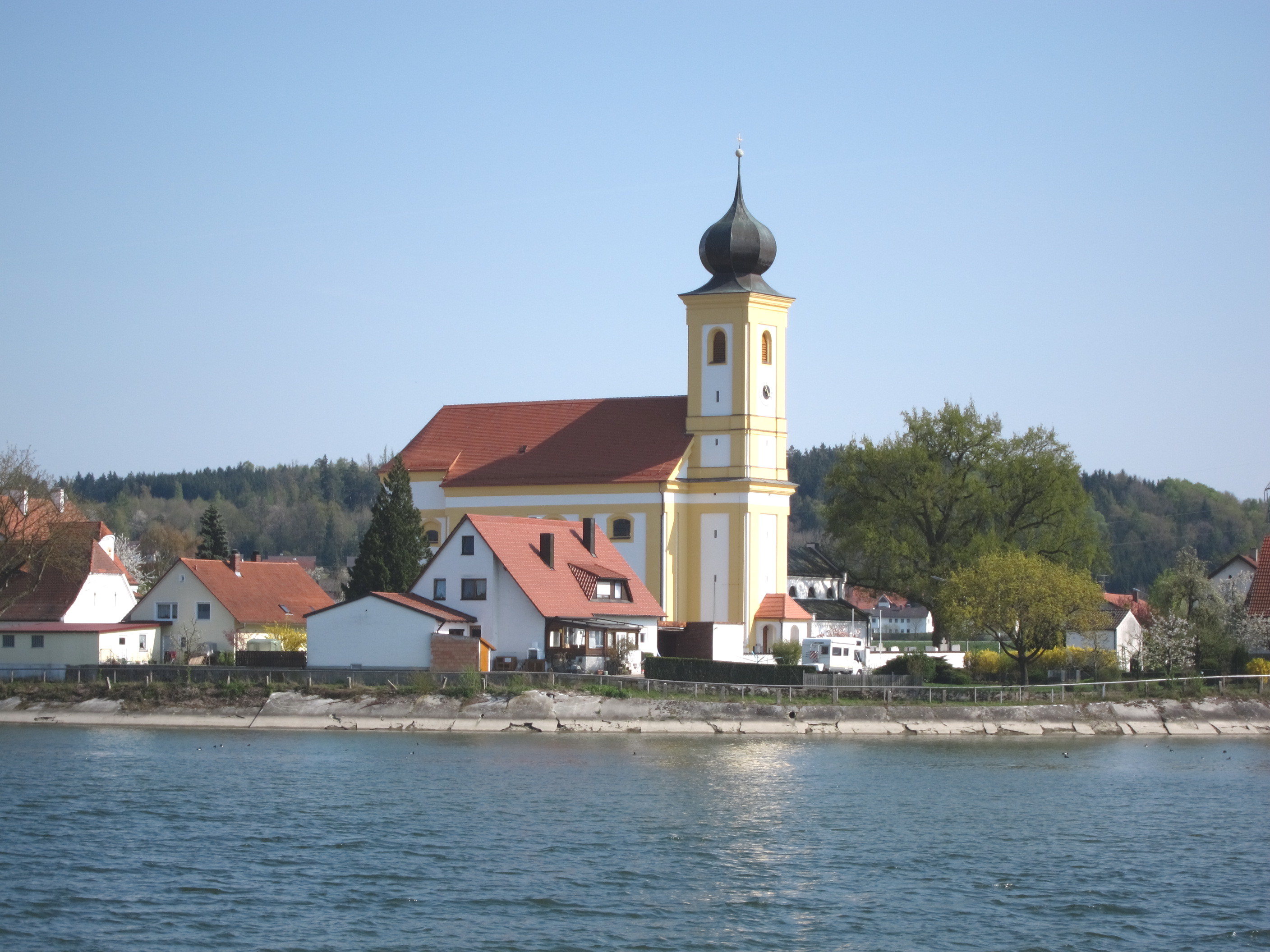
- Church of Saint John the Baptist

- Coat of arms

- Location of Eching within Landshut district
- Interactive map of Eching
- Location within Germany Location within Bavaria
- Coordinates: 48°30′N 12°4′E
- Country: Germany
- State: Bavaria
- Admin. region: Niederbayern
- District: Landshut
- Subdivisions: 5 Ortsteile

Government
  - Mayor (2020–26): Max Kofler (FW)

Area
  - Total: 30.14 km^{2} (11.64 sq mi)
- Elevation: 405 m (1,329 ft)

Population (2025-12-31)
  - Total: 4,254
  - Density: 141.1/km^{2} (365.6/sq mi)
- Time zone: UTC+01:00 (CET)
  - Summer (DST): UTC+02:00 (CEST)
- Postal codes: 84174
- Dialling codes: 08709
- Vehicle registration: LA
- Website: www.eching-ndb.de

Eching (German pronunciation: [ˈɛçɪŋ]) is a municipality in the district of Landshut in Bavaria in Germany. It lies on the Isar River.
