= Anne Day-Helveg =

Anne Day-Helveg (12 November 1898 – 14 September 1975) was an Austrian dancer, dance teacher, and romance writer. One of her novels was made into a film titled Liane, das Mädchen aus dem Urwald (Liane, Jungle Goddess). Her younger brother was the philosopher Karl Raimund Popper.

== Early life ==
Anne Day-Helveg was born in Vienna as Anna Lydia Popper. Her Jewish parents, the lawyer Dr. Simon S. C. Popper (1856–1932) and his wife Jenny Popper (née Schiff, 1864–1936), converted to Lutheranism two years after she was born. Thus, she became a Lutheran too. She grew up with her older sister Dora (1893–1930) and her younger brother Karl (1902–1994).

== Marriage and writing ==
Day-Helveg married three times. She changed her name several times by marriage (Gruner, Helveg, Lothringer) or by taking pen-names. As a dancer and dance teacher she was known as Annie Helveg during her time in Vienna. As a writer of romantic stories she called herself Anne Day-Helveg or Anne Day.

In 1938, shortly after her mother's death, she left Austria escaping from the Nazis to France without any money or passport. In 1941, under the name Anna Gruner-Helveg, she was accepted as stateless refugee in Geneva. Her brother Karl Popper supported her during war time by sending money through the Red Cross. She became a Swiss citizen after marrying the Swiss writer Fred Lothringer. They lived and worked together in Ascona, the place where she died in 1975.

Day-Helveg's only remarkable success was the romance in German language Liane, das Mädchen aus dem Urwald (Liane: The Girl from the Jungle), after having been made a German film in 1956 (Liane, Jungle Goddess). It is about a female Tarzan starring the four star-actors Marion Michael, Hardy Krüger, Irène Galter, and Reggie Nalder. In those years the topless young beauty Marion Michael was a sensation. Soon youth protection organizations discussed the case.

== Works ==
- Anne Day, Jacqueline oder Schuhe mit hohen Absätzen, Strasbourg-Schiltheim: Editions Du Rhin 1948.
- Anne Day-Helveg, Liane, das Mädchen aus dem Urwald, Bayreuth: Heros 1956.
- Anne Day-Helveg, Liane zwischen den Welten, Bayreuth: Heros 1958.
- Anne Day, Liebe brennt wie Feuer, Köln: Marken 1965.
- Anne Day, Getrennt und doch vereint, Juwelen-Roman Nr. 879, Rastatt (Baden): Pabel 1967.
- Anne Day, Fünf gläserne Särge, München: Lenz 1974.

== List of sources ==
- Hacohen, M. H. (2000), Karl R. Popper. The Formative Years 1902–1945, Cambridge University Press 2000.
- Miller, D. (1997), 'Sir Karl Raimund Popper', Biogr. Mem. Fellows R. Soc. 43 (1997), 367-409.
- Karl Popper-Sammlung (Karl Popper archive), University Library Klagenfurt/Austria, Supplement Box 6, Nr. 27.
- Archives d'État de Genève, CH 1211 Genève(Swiss), Rue de Hôtel-de-Ville 1, Personnes entegistrées à la frontière genevoise durant la Deuxième Guerre mondial.
