= Kitty and the Great Big World =

1956 film

- Directed by: Alfred Weidenmann
- Written by: Stefan Donat (play); Emil Burri; Herbert Reinecker; Johannes Mario Simmel
- Produced by: Wilhelm Sperber
- Starring: Romy Schneider; Karlheinz Böhm; O.E. Hasse
- Cinematography: Helmut Ashley; Robert Hofer
- Edited by: Carl Otto Bartning
- Music by: Hans-Martin Majewski
- Production company: Rhombus Film
- Distributed by: Herzog Filmverleih
- Release date: 13 September 1956
- Running time: 94 minutes
- Country: West Germany
- Language: German

Kitty and the Great Big World (German: Kitty und die große Welt) is a 1956 West German comedy film directed by Alfred Weidenmann and starring Romy Schneider, Karlheinz Böhm, and O.E. Hasse. It is a remake of the 1939 film Kitty and the World Conference.

== Plot ==
An international conference is being held in Geneva, with numerous foreign ministers scheduled to attend. The day is hectic, even in Jeannot's prestigious hair salon, where the two girls Kitty and Jeannette work as manicurists. Today they have their hands full, as many conference attendees have come to the salon to have their hair done. Even after work, Kitty's head is still buzzing with news about the event. Suddenly, she is approached by a distinguished gentleman who asks her for the location of the restaurant "Paradiso."

Kitty explains the way to him, but because the stranger seems to be unfamiliar with Geneva, she accompanies him there. The gentleman politely invites her, and she gladly accepts his invitation to dinner. After both have eaten, Kitty wants something else to eat, but not at the Paradiso, as it is too expensive. So she leads the gentleman to an unnamed restaurant. There, they are photographed by a reporter who had already observed them at the "Paradiso." While paying, she learns who her dining partner is: British Foreign Secretary, Sir William Ashlin.

The next morning, a photo appears in all the major newspapers showing the politician and Kitty at a table in the second restaurant. Crawford, the secretary of the British delegation, accuses his superior of leaving the restaurant unescorted the previous evening and causing an unpleasant situation with the girl. Now, he believes, a scandal is looming that must be covered up. He comes up with the idea of giving Sir William's nephew, Robert, who is also in Geneva as a diplomat, a special assignment to help him out of his predicament.

Robert Ashlin's first task is to arrange for Kitty to be granted a few days' leave from her employer to keep her away from the crowd of journalists. He and Kitty leave the hair salon through the back door and head into the mountains near Lake Geneva with his protégé. The two become close. As they part that evening, they arrange to take a boat trip to Malraux the next morning.

The British Foreign Secretary has finished his preparations for the main session. As he sits down for a shave in Jeannot's salon, the hairdresser notices his nervousness. He recommends a long walk in the fresh air. Such a walk had always worked wonders for his predecessor, Briand. Suddenly, Sir William feels a great urge to drive his car along the lake to Malraux. But after just a few kilometers, the road is closed. He asks a fisherman's boy to take him to Malraux in his boat. Once there, the boy demands two francs. Only then does the passenger realize he has forgotten his wallet. But because the boy insists on his request being met, he refuses to let his passenger disembark. Therefore, the World Conference takes place without the British Foreign Secretary.

Sir William believes his political career is about to end. However, when he returns to the English villa, he is not only warmly welcomed but also congratulated: Thanks to his absence, the conference has been a complete success for the United Kingdom. His absence alone has prompted the other foreign ministers to agree to further concessions.

Robert is relieved that after the conference, he won't have to fly back to London with his uncle, but can instead stay in Geneva for two more weeks to complete some diplomatic tasks. This gives him enough time to bring his relationship with Kitty to a happy conclusion.

== Cast ==
- Romy Schneider as Kitty Dupont
- Karlheinz Böhm as Robert Ashlin
- O.E. Hasse as Sir William Ashlin
- Ernst Schröder as Mr. Crawford - Sekretär
- Paul Dahlke as Herr Dupont
- Alice Treff as Frau Dupont
- Peer Schmidt as Boris Malewsky - Reporter
- Ina Peters as Jeanette
- Charles Regnier as Monsieur Jeannot
- Martin Andreas as Ein Fischerjunge
- Ernst Waldow as Herr Franz
- Hans Hermann Schaufuß as Armand
- Sammy Drechsel as Rundfunkreporter
- Heini Göbel as Fotoreporter
- Fritz Lafontaine as Geschäftsführer
- Eduard Linkers as Gastjaiswort
- Rainer Penkert as Hopkins
- Rudolf Rhomberg as Bistrowirt
- Willy Rösner
- Wolfgang Völz as Steel
- Sigfrit Steiner

== Bibliography ==
- Williams, Alan (2002). Film and Nationalism. New Brunswick, NJ: Rutgers University Press. ISBN 978-0-8135-3040-6.
