= You Can No Longer Remain Silent =

1955 West German romantic drama film

- Directed by: Robert A. Stemmle
- Written by: Kristmann Gudmundsson (novel); Robert A. Stemmle
- Produced by: Alfred Greven
- Starring: Heidemarie Hatheyer; Wilhelm Borchert; Werner Hinz
- Cinematography: Helmut Ashley
- Edited by: Ira Oberberg
- Music by: Wolfgang Zeller
- Production company: Alfred Greven Film
- Distributed by: Schorcht Filmverleih
- Release date: 28 October 1955
- Running time: 96 minutes
- Country: West Germany
- Language: German

You Can No Longer Remain Silent (German: Du darfst nicht länger schweigen) is a 1955 West German romantic drama film directed by Robert A. Stemmle and starring Heidemarie Hatheyer, Wilhelm Borchert and Werner Hinz. It is based on the 1929 novel Morning of Life by Kristmann Gudmundsson. It is set amongst feuding Scandinavian fishing families.

It was shot at the Tempelhof Studios in Berlin with location shooting around in Sweden around Gothenburg. The film's sets were designed by the art directors Helmut Nentwig and Karl Weber.

== Cast ==
- Heidemarie Hatheyer as Salvör
- Wilhelm Borchert as Haldor Bessanson
- Werner Hinz as Samuelsen
- Ingrid Andree as Maria und Gunna - deren Tochter
- Lucie Mannheim as Lobba, die Magd
- Paul Henckels as Knut, Allerhandmann
- Piet Clausen as Ragnar, Salvörs Sohn
- Adolf Dell as Jon Dyjawaka
- Hermann Erhardt as Bauer auf Hraun
- Armin Dahlen as Bjarne Lon
- Clemens Hasse as Haakon
- Heinz Lausch as Hannes Sidbrok
- Walter Bluhm as Einar
- Solveig Thomas as Bjagga - Sidbroks Frau
- Maria Schanda as Arnina - Dyjawakas Frau
- Margit Ensinger as Jona - Lons Frau
- Nuscha Richter as Guja - Haakons Frau
- Hellmut Grube as Geyerstam
- Heidi Becker as Kamilla, Salvörs Tochter
- Peter Finkbeiner as Svavar - Sohn des Bauern auf Hraun

== Bibliography ==
- Bock, Hans-Michael & Bergfelder, Tim. The Concise CineGraph. Encyclopedia of German Cinema. Berghahn Books, 2009.
