= Rudolph Schindler =

Rudolph or Rudolf Schindler may refer to:

- Rudolf Schindler (doctor) (1888–1968), German physician and gastroenterologist
- Rudolph Schindler (architect) (1887–1953), Austrian-born American architect
