= Der Stern von Afrika =

1957 film

Der Stern von Afrika The Star of Africa
- Directed by: Alfred Weidenmann
- Written by: Herbert Reinecker and Udo Wolter
- Produced by: Rüdgier von Hirschberg
- Starring: Joachim Hansen; Marianne Koch
- Cinematography: Helmut Ashley
- Music by: Hans-Martin Majewski
- Production company: Bavaria Film
- Release date: 13 August 1957
- Running time: 99 min.
- Country: West Germany
- Language: German

Der Stern von Afrika (English: The Star of Africa) is a 1957 black-and-white German war film portraying the combat career of a World War II Luftwaffe fighter pilot Hans-Joachim Marseille. The film stars Joachim Hansen and Marianne Koch and was directed by Alfred Weidenmann, whose film career began in the Nazi era.

Der Stern von Afrika was premièred on 13 August 1957 in Berlin and was popular at the German box office. The film was criticised for hewing closely to wartime propaganda in its portrayal of the German war effort and for avoiding an honest confrontation with the past.

== Plot ==
The film begins shortly before the outbreak of World War II with Jochen Marseille (Joachim Hansen) attending a Luftwaffe school in Berlin. His performance gains high recognition for his outstanding skill as a fighter pilot. His squadron starts off in France during the Battle of Britain, but is transferred to the Afrika Korps in North Africa. Marseille quickly becomes the most successful fighter pilot.

His unit loses more and more pilots to the Desert Air Force, and Marseille begins to doubt the usefulness of his operations. He travels to Berlin to receive a high military decoration where he falls in love with a teacher, Brigitte (Marianne Koch).

The couple go to Rome where Marseille is to receive a decoration. The distraught Brigitte tries to persuade him to defect, but he returns to North Africa. During a flight over Egypt, his aircraft suffers an engine failure and crashes. Marseille attempts to take to his parachute, but his body is later found in the desert. Brigitte receives the news of his death.

== Cast ==
- Joachim Hansen as Jochen Marseille
- Marianne Koch as Brigitte
- Hansjörg Felmy as Robert Franke
- Horst Frank as Albin Droste
- Peer Schmidt as Answald Sommer
- Alexander Kerst as Major Niemeyer
- Gisela von Collande as Marseille's mother
- Arno Paulsen as Marseille's father
- Siegfried Schürenberg as the director of the school
- Christian Doermer as Unteroffizier Klein
- Hans Hermann Schaufuß
- Albert Hehn as Major Schliemann
- Erich Ponto as the French billiard player
- Carl Lange as Hauptmann Krusenberg
- Roberto Blanco (as Roberto Zerquera) as Mathias
- Fernando Sancho as Unteroffizier Strauch

== Production ==
Writer Herbert Reinecker and director Alfred Weidenmann had started a productive streak of collaborations in 1941, when Reinecker had published a historical novel in a series of children's books edited by Weidenmann. Weidenmann had directed his first feature film for the Reichspropagandaleitung of the NSDAP, Hauptamt Film in 1942.

As specialists for propaganda specifically targeting the German youth the two teamed up as writer and director in 1944 to make Junge Adler (Young Eagles), one of the most successful and renowned Nazi propaganda movies. After the war Weidenmann helped Reinecker to reenter the film business. During the 1950s they did several movies of various genres together, among them documentaries, comedies and crime films, but also the spy movie Canaris (1954).

Reinecker based his script of Der Stern von Afrika upon a "factual report" by journalist Udo Wolter in the magazine Revue.

Several actors, who would later become well known stars of German cinema and television such as Hansjörg Felmy and Horst Frank, made their screen debut with Der Stern von Afrika. The Cuban Roberto Zerquera, who was cast by Weidenmann on the spot when they accidentally met on an aircraft, would later make a decades-long career in Germany as a singer under the stage name Roberto Blanco.

The movie was edited by Carl Otto Bartning, who had worked on the Nazi aviation propaganda movies Feuertaufe and Kampfgeschwader Lützow with director Hans Bertram. In 1941, Bartning had also collaborated with effects cameraman Karl Ludwig Ruppel to make the semidocumentary Front am Himmel (Front in the Sky). Ruppel worked on Der Stern von Afrika. Here he used British traveling matte techniques to incorporate model airplanes. Mechanical effects and explosives were designed by Erwin Lange, who had also worked on Pour le Mérite (1938), Stukas (1941), Quax the Crash Pilot (1941) and Kolberg (1943-44) and would continue to be involved in war movies like Paths of Glory (1957), Stalingrad: Dogs, Do You Want to Live Forever? (1958), Die Brücke (1959) as well as The Vikings (1957) and Cleopatra (1960-1962). Eduard Neumann, the former Geschwaderkommodore (wing commander) of Jagdgeschwader 27 (27th fighter wing) and Marseille's commanding officer, served as a technical advisor on the film.

Der Stern von Afrika was produced by Neue Münchner Lichtspielkunst GmbH - Neue Emelka. To finance the picture, Neue Emelka applied to Berliner Revisions- und Treuhand Aktiengesellschaft through which the Federal Republic of Germany granted loans for movie projects. In their submission to Treuhand, Neue Emelka touted their project as a kind of counterweight to Des Teufels General. Their film, they claimed, would be indispensable to foster military preparedness in West Germany's war-weary population.

The application was turned down, however, because the German Ministry of the Interior and the Ministry of Defence found fault with the script. The producers managed to raise the production cost of DM 1,3 million by themselves, not at least because they received support from Francoist Spain. The Spanish Air Force provided aircraft, pilots, personnel and any military material needed.

== Release ==
A first version of Der Stern von Afrika was screened to representatives of the German Ministries of Defence and the Interior on 20 February 1957. The Ministry of Defence asked for several cuts, because it feared the film might be seen as romanticizing wartime events and could provoke the impression that it followed Nazi German propaganda suggesting the invasion of Poland was somehow provoked by Polish attacks.

The ministry further asked that any reference to Hitler would be left out and that the film would not end with a scene in which Marseille's fiancé receives the message of his death while teaching a school class. It was perceived that this would lead the audience to conclude that the children of the 1940s were to become soldiers again in the present. In general, however, both ministries now supported the film, which they considered to be an authentic portrayal of the spirit of German fighter pilots in 1942. They saw and acknowledged in it a general tendency to depict the hardships and problems of the war, while positively honoring the human value of soldierly achievements and comradeship.

With that endorsement, Emelka applied for a final grant from Treuhand. It was once again turned down, most likely because Treuhand feared that the film would be banned out of political concerns. In fact, in May 1957 the Freiwillige Selbstkontrolle der Filmwirtschaft (FSK) initially did not approve the film, because it perceived "national socialist tendencies" and, in particular, because it thought that the historical situation was inappropriately distorted. It is neither clear, how the FSK came to that conclusion, nor what made it change its mind, but the film was approved soon after.

In June 1957, the Press and Information Agency of the Federal Government (Bundespresseamt) provided for the last DM 300,000 needed for post-production, but ensured that it would not be publicly involved by channeling the money through a private bank and another company.

The film distributor advertised Der Stern von Afrika by claiming that "it was about time that a German production showed how splendid the German fighter pilots actually were, the more so, as we can present the absolute world record holder in this field, the Captain Hans-Joachim Marseille". The movie premiered on 13 August 1957 in Hannover with Marseille's mother attending.

== Reception ==
Der Stern von Afrika was a box office success. Newspapers reported that the audiences were "most pleasantly shaken", while younger viewers were enthused.

Der Stern von Afrika was criticised by reviewers, however, who had hoped for a critical confrontation with the past. Critics pointed to the past collaborations of director Alfred Weidenmann and writer Herbert Reinecker and noted the similarities between Stern von Afrika and Young Eagles (Junge Adler). They spoke of the "teutonic glorification" in the film, likened it to the propaganda style under Goebbels and speculated that the Der Stern von Afrika would not have looked much different if the Nazis had won the war.

The Süddeutsche Zeitung commented that "now they're flying again, and they're falling again, they do it most discreetly and no blood flows". In the Berlin Tagesspiegel Karena Niehoff concluded, that the movie might not endorse the Nazis on war, but that it did not explicitly oppose neither. Weidenmann himself claimed in an interview that he was attempting an act of "spiritual cleansing", because "in history there are no completely new beginnings, only continuations." The Frankfurter Rundschau commented: "One leaves the movie theatre thinking, that it has been Marseille today, in two years it could be - if one is simply continuing - Sepp Dietrich."

Critics unanimously agreed that Weidenmann's portrayal of history in Der Stern von Afrika evoked dangerous continuities and was designed to clean up the past from National Socialism. The media historian James Chapman described the film as a "whitewash" that presented an "acceptable face of wartime heroics" in West German films of that period. The film did not portray Marseille's Nazi convictions, instead presenting his a rebel in trouble with his superiors.

The FSK was criticized for not restricting the movie to audiences under 18.
