= Walter Bluhm =

German actor (1907–1976)

- Born: 5 August 1907; Berlin, German Empire
- Died: 2 December 1976 (aged 69); Munich, West Germany
- Occupation: Actor

Walter Bluhm (5 August 1904 – 2 December 1976) was a German film and television actor. He was married to Charlotte Hepprich. From 1937 to 1940 and in 1951, he dubbed Stan Laurel's voice in German-language releases of Laurel and Hardy films.

== Partial filmography ==
- Glückspilze (1935) - Georg Lewaldt
- Hermine und die sieben Aufrechten (1935)
- The Beaver Coat (1937) - Schreiber Glasenapp
- The Muzzle (1938) - Schwefelhölzchen
- Pour le Mérite (1938) - Husar
- Brand im Ozean (1939) - Sekretär Parker
- Seinerzeit zu meiner Zeit (1944) - Theobald
- The Green Salon (1944) - Oswin, Handlanger
- Der Mann, dem man den Namen stahl (1944) - Ganove & Sänger
- Somewhere in Berlin (1946) - Onkel Kalle
- The Berliner (1948) - West U-Bahn Fahrgast (uncredited)
- The Beaverskin (1949) - Levin
- Master of Life and Death (1955) - Werner Hansen
- Die Ratten (1955)
- Hotel Adlon (1955) - Sekretär Lindström
- Love, Dance and a Thousand Songs (1955) - Fernsehreporter (uncredited)
- You Can No Longer Remain Silent (1955) - Einar
- Das Sandmännchen (1955)
- Dornröschen (1955)
- Alibi (1955) - Justizbeamter (uncredited)
- Studentin Helene Willfüer (1956) - Herr Hörselmann
- Du bist Musik (1956) - Diener Johann
- Liane, Jungle Goddess (1956) - Port Said Rep
- Ein Mann muß nicht immer schön sein (1956) - Theaterregisseur
- Petersburg Nights (1958) - Arzt
- Aus dem Tagebuch eines Frauenarztes (1959) - Karl Mägerlein
- Old Heidelberg (1959) - Diener Schölermann
- Sabine und die 100 Männer (1960) - Wolke
- The Invisible Dr. Mabuse (1962) - Portier
- Manhattan Night of Murder (1965) - Billy's Grandpa
- Asterix and Cleopatra (1968) - Numerobis (German version, voice)
- Under the Roofs of St. Pauli (1970) - Schnapsbruder
- Arsène Lupin: Les Tableaux de Tornbüll (1971) - Graf von Tornbüll
- Die Stadt im Tal (1975, TV film) - Heimatpfleger Alten

== Bibliography ==
- Shandley, Robert R. Rubble Films: German Cinema in the Shadow of the Third Reich. Temple University Press, 2001.
