= And So to Bed =

1963 film

- Directed by: Alfred Weidenmann
- Written by: Herbert Reinecker
- Based on: Reigen 51 by Michael Kehl; Carl Merz; Helmut Qualtinger
- Produced by: Adolf Eder; Karl Spiehs
- Starring: Lilli Palmer; Hildegard Knef; Daliah Lavi
- Cinematography: Georg Bruckbauer
- Edited by: Gretl Girinec; Alfred Srp
- Music by: Charly Niessen
- Production companies: Team-Film; Wiener Stadthalle-Station Betriebs-und Produktionsgesellschaft
- Distributed by: Nora Film
- Release date: 12 November 1963
- Running time: 112 minutes
- Countries: West Germany; Austria; France
- Language: German

And So to Bed (German: Das große Liebesspiel) is a 1963 West German-Austrian-French comedy film directed by Alfred Weidenmann and starring Lilli Palmer, Hildegard Knef and Daliah Lavi. The film' sets were designed by the art directors Hertha Hareiter and Otto Pischinger.

== Synopsis ==
A number of couples engage in complex encounters.

== Cast ==
- Lilli Palmer as Schauspielerin
- Hildegard Knef as Callgirl
- Daliah Lavi as Sekretärin
- Alexandra Stewart as Rektorengattin
- Thomas Fritsch as Schüler
- Danièle Gaubert as Französin
- Peter van Eyck as Chef
- Paul Hubschmid as Diplomat
- Elisabeth Flickenschildt as Ältere Dame
- Walter Giller as Polizist
- Charles Regnier as Regisseur
- Angelo Santi as Gastarbeiter
- Peter Parten as Student
- Nadja Tiller as Geschiedene Frau
- Martin Held as Rektor
- Ulli Lommel as Schulkamerad
- Gisela Trowe as Fräulein Bienert
- Fritz Tillmann as Gerhard Themann

== Bibliography ==
- Campbell, Russell. Marked Women: Prostitutes and Prostitution in the Cinema. University of Wisconsin Press, 2006.
- Preece, Julian. Adapting Sex on Screen: The Cinematic Biographies of Lulu, La Ronde and Venus in Furs. Bloomsbury Academic, 2026.
