= O. E. Hasse =

German actor (1903–1978)

Otto Eduard Hasse
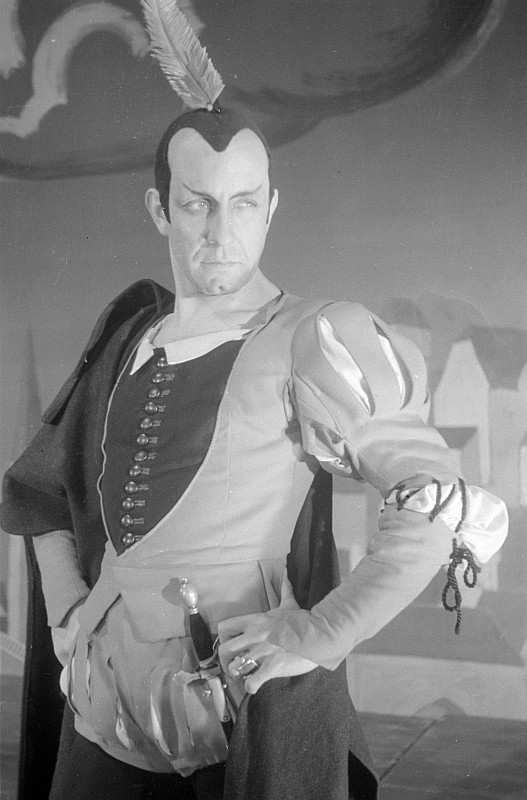
- O. E. Hasse as Mephistopheles
- Born: 11 July 1903; Obersitzko, Province of Posen, German Empire
- Died: 12 September 1978 (aged 75); West Berlin, West Germany
- Other name: O. E. Hasse
- Occupation: Actor
- Years active: 1931–1977

Otto Eduard Hasse (11 July 1903 – 12 September 1978) was a German film actor and director.

== Biography ==
Hasse was born to Wilhelm Gustav Eduard Hasse, a blacksmith, and Valeria Hasse in the village of Obersitzko, Province of Posen, German Empire and gained his first stage experiences in high school at Kolmar, together with his classmate Berta Drews. Hasse began to study law at the University of Berlin but abandoned this study after three semesters and changed over to Max Reinhardt's acting school at the Deutsches Theater in Berlin, to receive an actor's education.

He first appeared at theatres in Thale, Breslau, and from 1930 till 1939 at the Kammerspiele in Munich, where he also worked as a stage director for the first time. In 1939, he moved to the German Theatre in Prague and shortened his name to O.E. instead of Otto Eduard.

In 1944, he was conscripted to the Luftwaffe and slightly wounded. After World War II Hasse became a famous German film actor, also internationally appearing in the Alfred Hitchcock film I Confess (1953) with Montgomery Clift and Anne Baxter, and starring with Clark Gable and Lana Turner in Betrayed (1954).

In 1959, he was a member of the jury at the 9th Berlin International Film Festival.

Hasse was the German dubbing voice of Charles Laughton, Humphrey Bogart, Spencer Tracy and Clark Gable. Hasse died in West Berlin and is buried at the Waldfriedhof Dahlem.

== Personal life ==
Hasse was gay. His life partner for 30 years was entrepreneur Max Wiener, who worked as a manager at the Swiss media corporation Ringier and was an early gay rights and AIDS advocate.

In the spring of 1939, Hasse was sentenced to two months in prison in Munich for homosexuality in accordance with Section 175 of the German Criminal Code, which was considered a relatively lenient sentence during Nazi Germany. His integrity, his confession and his artistic achievements were seen as mitigating factors. After his two months in prison, he was able to continue his career in Prague. It is said that this was perhaps helped by the fact that Adolf Hitler and Joseph Goebbels enjoyed his performances.

== Award ==
Since 1981, the Academy of Arts, Berlin, has awarded an O.E. Hasse Prize to benefit young actors.

== Filmography ==
- The Last Laugh (1924) as Small Role (uncredited)
- Peter Voss, Thief of Millions (1932) as 2. Realtor
- Cruiser Emden (1932) as English Officer
- Must We Get Divorced? (1933) as A hairdresser
- Fräulein Hoffmans Erzählungen (1933)
- The Switched Bride (1934)
- Little Dorrit (1934)
- Peer Gynt (1934) as helmsman
- Knockout (1935)
- Ein ganzer Kerl (1935) as Manfred Bolle, Son
- The King's Prisoner (1935) as Von Zilchow
- The Unsuspecting Angel (1936) as Kornitzki
- The Bashful Casanova (1936) as Schnellhase, chief advertiser
- Die große und die kleine Welt (1936)
- Dinner Is Served (1936) as Francis, chauffeur
- So weit geht die Liebe nicht (1937) as hairdresser Hübner
- Three Wonderful Days (1939)
- Stukas (1941) as Senior doctor Dr. Gregorius
- Everything for Gloria (1941) as Dr. Heinz
- Illusion (1941) as Peter Wallbrecht
- Rembrandt (1942)
- Die Entlassung (1942) as Baron von Heyden
- Doctor Crippen (1942) as Prof. Morrison
- My Summer Companion (1943) as Gerhard Morton, Angelika's betrothed
- The Eternal Tone (1943) as Impresario Grundmann
- Beloved Darling (1943) as Lawyer
- Der große Preis (1944) as inspector Wegener
- Der Täter ist unter uns (1944) as Dr. Kauper
- Come Back to Me (1944)
- Aufruhr der Herzen (1944) as Thomas Volderauer
- Philharmonic (1944) as Urdol, concert agent
- The Berliner (1948) as the reactionary
- Anonymous Letters (1949) as Alexander Petershagen
- The Big Lift (1950) as Stieber
- The Orplid Mystery (1950) as editor in chief Dr. Mannheim
- Decision Before Dawn (1951) as Col. Oberst von Ecker
- The Sergeant's Daughter (1952) as cavalry captain Graf Ledenburg
- I Confess (1953) as Otto Keller
- The Last Waltz (1953) as Prince Paul
- When The Village Music Plays on Sunday Nights (1953) as Bruckner
- Lachkabinett (1953)
- Betrayed (1954) as Col. Helmuth Dietrich
- Canaris (1954) as Adm. Canaris
- Above Us the Waves (1955) as Captain of the Tirpitz
- 08/15 – Part 2 (1955) as Colonel von Plönnies
- 08/15 at Home (1955) as General von Plönnies
- Alibi (1955) as Peter Hansen
- Kitty and the Great Big World (1956) as Sir William Ashlin
- The Adventures of Arsène Lupin (1957) as emperor Wilhelm II
- No Sun in Venice (1957) as Eric von Bergen
- The Last Ones Shall Be First (1957) as Ludwig Darrandt
- The Spies (1957) as Hugo Vogel
- The Glass Tower (1957) as Robert Fleming
- The Doctor of Stalingrad (1958) as Dr. Fritz Böhler, Staff surgeon
- The Muzzle (1958) as prosecutor Herbert von Treskow
- As Long as the Heart Still Beats (1958) as Dr. Hans Römer
- Mrs. Warren's Profession (1960) as Sir George Crofts
- The Nabob Affair (1960) as Le Nabab
- The Marriage of Mr. Mississippi (1961) as Florestan Mississippi
- Life Begins at Eight (1962) as Mac Thomas
- The Elusive Corporal (1962) as drunk passenger on the train
- Lulu (1962) as Dr. Schön
- Vice and Virtue (1963) as General von Bamberg
- The Secret of Dr. Mabuse (1964) as Prof. Larsen
- Three Rooms in Manhattan (1965) as Hourvitch
- State of Siege (1972) as Carlos Ducas
- The Peaceful Age (1975) as Simone
- Ice Age (1975) as Old Man
- Konkurs (TV-series The Old Fox) (1977) as consul Karst

== Awards ==
- 1951: Berliner Kunstpreis
- 1955: Berliner Senatspreis
- 1961: member of Berlin Akademy of Arts
- 1964: Staatsschauspieler
- 1973: Ernst-Reuter-Plakette
- 1973: Großes Verdienstkreuz der Bundesrepublik Deutschland
