= Terror After Midnight =

1962 film

- Directed by: Jürgen Goslar
- Written by: Joseph Hayes (novel); Wolfgang Schnitzler
- Produced by: Luggi Waldleitner
- Starring: Christine Kaufmann; Martin Held; Hilde Krahl
- Cinematography: Klaus von Rautenfeld
- Edited by: Wolfgang Wehrum
- Music by: Bert Kaempfert
- Production company: Roxy Film
- Distributed by: Constantin Film
- Release date: 26 October 1962
- Running time: 82 minutes
- Country: West Germany
- Language: German

Terror After Midnight (German: Neunzig Minuten nach Mitternacht) is a 1962 German drama film directed by Jürgen Goslar and starring Christine Kaufmann, Martin Held, and Hilde Krahl. It is based on the novel The Hours After Midnight by Joseph Hayes.

The film's sets were designed by the art director Wolf Englert.

== Plot ==
A social outcast kidnaps a teenage girl and holds her to ransom.

== Cast ==
- Christine Kaufmann as Julie Elgin
- Martin Held as Charles Elgin
- Hilde Krahl as Helen Elgin
- Christian Doermer as Nolan Stoddard
- Karel Stepanek as Vater Stoddard
- Bruno Dietrich as Phil Reynolds
- Wolfgang Zilzer as Vater Reynolds
- Heinz Schimmelpfennig as Inspektor Hopkins
- Max Buchsbaum as Assistant
- Thomas Braut as Mr. Gibson
- Ursula Herwig as Mrs. Ann
- Hans Bernhardt as Mr. Easton
- Gerda Maria Klein as Mrs. Easton
