= Johanna Matz =

Austrian actress (1932–2025)

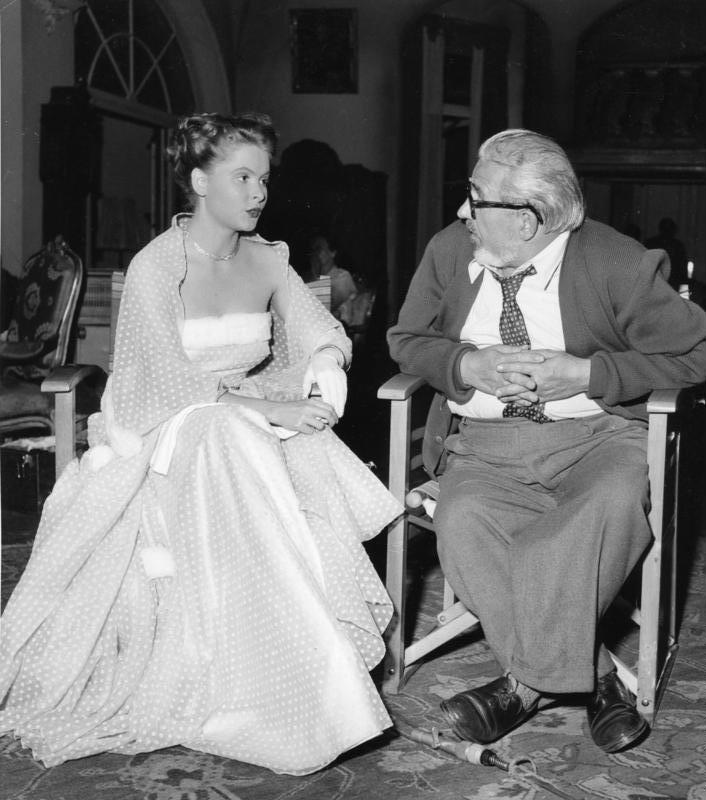
- Matz with the film director Karl Hartl in 1953
- Born: 5 October 1932; Vienna, Austria
- Died: 21 April 2025 (aged 92)
- Occupation: Actress
- Years active: 1951–2004

Johanna Matz (5 October 1932 – 21 April 2025) was an Austrian actress.

Matz was born in Vienna, Austria on 5 October 1932. She began as a dancer and from 1950 to 1993 acted at the Burgtheater. Matz died on 21 April 2025, at the age of 92.

== Selected filmography ==
- Maria Theresa (1951)
- Hannerl (1952)
- Season in Salzburg (1952)
- The White Horse Inn (1952)
- The Sergeant's Daughter (1952)
- The Forester's Daughter (1952)
- Everything for Father (1953)
- Die Jungfrau auf dem Dach (1953), the German version of The Moon Is Blue (1953), which was filmed at the same time, on the same sets and days, filmed by the same director Otto Preminger, and in which she had a cameo
- Arlette Conquers Paris (1953)
- They Were So Young (1954)
- Ingrid - Die Geschichte eines Fotomodells (1955)
- The Life and Loves of Mozart (1955)
- The Congress Dances (1955)
- Regine (1956)
- And Lead Us Not Into Temptation (1957)
- One Should Be Twenty Again (1958)
- Trees Are Blooming in Vienna (1958)
- Die unvollkommene Ehe (1959)
- Mrs. Warren's Profession (1960)
- The Happy Years of the Thorwalds (1962)
- Life Begins at Eight (1962)
- Call of the Forest (1965)
- The Tale of the 1002nd Night (1969, TV film)
- The Captain (1971)
- When Mother Went on Strike (1974)

== Decorations and awards ==
- 1967: Appointed chamber actress (Kammerschauspielerin)
- 2002: Austrian Cross of Honour for Science and Art, 1st class
