= Liane, Jungle Goddess =

- Theatrical release poster
- Directed by: Eduard von Borsody
- Written by: Anne Day-Helveg (novel Liane, das Mädchen aus dem Urwald), Thomas Fough (idea) and Ernst von Salomon (script)
- Produced by: Helmuth Volmer (producer)
- Starring: Marion Michael; Hardy Krüger
- Cinematography: Bruno Timm
- Edited by: Walter von Bonhorst
- Music by: Erwin Halletz
- Distributed by: Arca-Filmgesellschaft mbH
- Release date: 4 October 1956
- Running time: 88 minutes
- Country: West Germany
- Language: German

Liane, Jungle Goddess (German Liane, das Mädchen aus dem Urwald) is a 1956 West German film directed by Eduard von Borsody. It was based on the 1956 novel Liane, das Mädchen aus dem Urwald by Anne Day-Helveg. The film attracted considerable attention due to Marion Michael appearing topless.

== Plot ==
During a German expedition in Africa, Thoren is attacked and captured by the native Botos. Before they can kill him, a long-haired, topless wild woman convinces the Botos to let him go. Thoren becomes fascinated with the woman and enlists Kersten and Keller to capture her.

Meanwhile, in Germany, shipping tycoon Theo Amelongen and his nephew Viktor see an article about the wild woman that was found and Theo suspects that it might be his long-lost granddaughter Liane, who went missing 18 years ago when the ship she and her parents were on went down. Theo sails to Africa and Thoren takes Liane with him and Jacqueline. Liane's tribesman friend Tanga sneaks onto the ship with Liane's pet lion, Simba.

When the group ends up at Theo's house, Viktor discovers that Liane will be inheriting the fortune. Viktor hires one of the few surviving crew members of the ship's sinking and bribes him to testify that there were no passengers among the survivors.

When the attorney arrives with Viktor, they find Theo dead in his study. The police are called in and it is revealed that Viktor was responsible for his uncle's death. Viktor then gets into his car as Thoren and the police pursue him. The car chase goes down the street until Viktor ends up driving off the bridge to his death.

Liane inherits the Amelongen fortune and heads back to Africa to visit the Danner expedition.

== Cast ==
- Marion Michael - Liane
- Hardy Krüger - Thoren
- Irène Galter - Dr. Jacqueline Goddard
- Peter Mosbacher - Tibor Teleky
- Rudolf Forster - Theo Amelongen
- Reggie Nalder - Viktor
- Rolf von Nauckhoff - Professor Danner
- Edward Tierney - Kersten
- Reinhard Kolldehoff - Keller
- Herbert Hübner - Justizrat Warmuth
- Olga von Togni - Alma
- Jean Pierre Faye - Tanga
- Arno Paulsen - Kriminalkommissar
- Anneliese Würtz - Frieda the Maid
- Editha Horn - Miss Helumund
- Waltraut Runze - Ellen the Upstairs Maid
- Walter Bluhm - Port Said Rep
- Curt Lucas - Ship's Captain
- Hans Emons - Nedrick
- Erik Radolf - Jensen

== Sequel ==
There was a sequel called Nature Girl and the Slaver, a.k.a. Jungle Girl and the Slaver (1957) where Marion Michael reprises her role of Liane. Set in North Africa, this story concerns Arab slave traders who abduct Liane and members of her tribe.

A third film Liane, die Tochter des Dschungels was released in 1961 but it was only a compilation of the first two films.

== Reception ==
The film was a big commercial success, mostly based on the presence of Marion Michael as "female Tarzan".

The film was distributed in France as Liane, la sauvageonne and at the time of the release of the sequel Jeanne l'esclave blanche, Jean-Luc Godard praised the films' (and the actress's) beauty.

In a retrospective critical assessment, Film Dienst described the film as "Simple nonsense, which, however, became one of the great financial successes of the post-war period due to its flirtation with nudity, which from today's perspective is ridiculous." Another commentator found it "extremely childish".
