= Boomerang (1960 film) =

1960 film

- Directed by: Alfred Weidenmann
- Written by: Herbert Reinecker
- Based on: Boomerang by Igor Sentjurc
- Produced by: Luggi Waldleitner
- Starring: Hardy Krüger; Martin Held; Mario Adorf
- Cinematography: Kurt Hasse
- Edited by: Lilian Seng
- Music by: Hans-Martin Majewski
- Production company: Roxy Film
- Distributed by: UFA
- Release date: 14 January 1960
- Running time: 92 minutes
- Country: West Germany
- Language: German

Boomerang (German: Bumerang) is a 1960 West German crime thriller film directed by Alfred Weidenmann and starring Hardy Krüger, Martin Held and Mario Adorf. It was shot at the Tempelhof Studios in West Berlin and on location around the city. The film's sets were designed by the art directors Wolf Englert and Ernst Richter.

== Synopsis ==
Three down-on-their-luck men come together to plot a heist. Things get complicated when Else, the former girlfriend of Robert, arrives on the scene. She is now living with Willy, but still has feelings for Robert. Willy's jealousy leads him to give an anonymous tip-off to the authorities. While Robert and George go ahead with their attempt to break into a safe, they are surrounded by police officers led by Commissioner Stern. He recognises Robert as the man who had saved his life in the war years before.

== Cast ==
- Hardy Krüger as Robert Wegner
- Martin Held as Hauptkommissar Stern
- Mario Adorf as Georg Kugler
- Horst Frank as Willy Schneider
- Ingrid van Bergen as Else
- Peer Schmidt as Wachtmeister Meyer
- Ernst Waldow as Bremer
- Cordula Trantow as Helga, genannt 'Schmetterling'
- Lu Säuberlich as Frau Stern
- Wega Jahnke as Ulla Stern
- Marielouise Nagel as Frau Meyer
- Edith Hancke as Woman on train

== Bibliography ==
- Bock, Hans-Michael & Bergfelder, Tim. The Concise CineGraph. Encyclopedia of German Cinema. Berghahn Books, 2009.
- Goble, Alan. The Complete Index to Literary Sources in Film. Walter de Gruyter, 1999.
