= I and You =

1953 film by Alfred Weidenmann

- Directed by: Alfred Weidenmann
- Written by: Herbert Reinecker; Alfred Weidenmann
- Produced by: Erwin Gitt; Friedrich A. Mainz; Willy Zeyn
- Starring: Hardy Krüger; Liselotte Pulver; Claus Biederstaedt
- Cinematography: Franz Weihmayr
- Edited by: Erhard Hans Albrecht
- Music by: Lothar Brühne
- Production companies: Neue Emelka; Willy Zeyn-Film
- Distributed by: Europa-Filmverleih
- Release date: 27 November 1953
- Running time: 94 minutes
- Country: West Germany
- Language: German

I and You (German: Ich und Du) is a 1953 West German comedy film directed by Alfred Weidenmann and starring Hardy Krüger, Liselotte Pulver and Claus Biederstaedt. It was shot at the Bavaria Studios in Munich and on location in Italy. The film's sets were designed by the art directors Franz Bi and Bruno Monden.

== Synopsis ==
Peter Erdmann falls in love with Brigitte after buying a record from her in the music shop where she works. They swiftly marry and go on honeymoon to Italy, but before long they discover more about each other and feel increasingly incompatible as a couple. As their money runs out things come to a head, and they separate. However, they continue using the same apartment due to their financial situation. Both spend time with other people, with the attractive Marianne falling for Peter. However, when Peter's mother comes to stay, they act the part of the happy couple for her. Gradually they fall in love with each other again, ending all thoughts of divorce.

== Cast ==
- Hardy Krüger as Peter Erdmann
- Liselotte Pulver as Brigitte
- Claus Biederstaedt as Paul
- Doris Kirchner as Marianne
- Peer Schmidt as Charly
- Arno Paulsen as Vater Erdmann
- Edith Schultze-Westrum as Mutter Erdmann
- Lucie Mannheim as Tante Gruber
- Otto Brüggemann as Der Nervöse
- Hans Hermann Schaufuß as Der Forsche
- Ursula Herking as Die Nachbarin
- Kurt Waitzmann as Herr Roland

== Bibliography ==
- Parish, James Robert. Film Actors Guide. Scarecrow Press, 1977.
