= Angels of the Street (1969 film) =

1969 film

- Film poster
- Directed by: Jürgen Roland
- Written by: Werner Jörg Lüddecke; Karl Heinz Zeitler
- Starring: Horst Frank; Herbert Fux; Werner Pochath
- Cinematography: Petrus R. Schlömp
- Edited by: Herbert Taschner
- Music by: Siegfried Franz
- Production company: Studio Hamburg Filmproduktion
- Distributed by: Inter-Verleih Film
- Release date: 24 October 1969
- Running time: 102 minutes
- Country: West Germany
- Language: German

Angels of the Street or The Angel of St. Pauli (German: Die Engel von St. Pauli) is a 1969 West German crime film directed by Jürgen Roland and starring Horst Frank, Herbert Fux and Werner Pochath. It is set in the St. Pauli red light district of the port of Hamburg.

The film's sets were designed by the art director Dieter Bartels.

== Cast ==
- Horst Frank as Jule Nickels
- Herbert Fux as Holleck
- Werner Pochath as Herbert Priel
- Karl Lieffen as Radensky
- Rainer Basedow as Clock-Five
- Gernot Endemann as Blinky
- Irmgard Riessen as Lisa Naumann
- Margot Mahler as Elli
- Christa Siems as Frieda
- Horst Hesslein as Mohr
- Uwe Carstens as Uwe
- Reinhold Timm
- Hans Waldherr
- Will Danin
- Denes Törzs as Rudi
- Jürgen Lier
- Mike Henning
- Jochen Sehrndt
- Günter Lüdke
- Jürgen Janza
- Will van Deeg as Quassel, Anwalt
- Karl-Ulrich Meves as Hansen
- Gabriele Scharon
- Esther Daniels
- Günther Neutze as Kommissar Beringer

== Bibliography ==
- Bock, Hans-Michael & Bergfelder, Tim. The Concise CineGraph. Encyclopedia of German Cinema. Berghahn Books, 2009.
