= Christa Siems =

German actress

- Born: 28 May 1916; German Empire
- Died: 27 May 1990 (aged 73); Hamburg, West Germany
- Occupation: Actress
- Years active: 1940-1990

Christa Siems (1916–1990) was a German film and television actress.

== Selected filmography ==
- Pension Schöller (1960)
- Pichler's Books Are Not in Order (1961)
- Angels of the Street (1969)
- Under the Roofs of St. Pauli (1970)
- Moritz, Dear Moritz (1978)

== Bibliography ==
- Kaplan, Mike. Variety international showbusiness reference. Garland, 1981.
