= Under the Roofs of St. Pauli =

1970 film

- Directed by: Alfred Weidenmann
- Written by: Herbert Reinecker
- Produced by: Reginald Puhl
- Starring: Jean-Claude Pascal; Joseph Offenbach; Werner Peters
- Cinematography: Karl Löb
- Edited by: Walter von Bonhorst
- Music by: Peter Thomas
- Production company: Reginald Puhl Filmproduktion
- Distributed by: Inter-Verleih Film-Gesellschaft
- Release date: 20 March 1970
- Running time: 98 minutes
- Country: West Germany
- Language: German

Under the Roofs of St. Pauli (German: Unter den Dächern von St. Pauli) is a 1970 West German crime drama film directed by Alfred Weidenmann and starring Jean-Claude Pascal, Joseph Offenbach and Werner Peters.

== Cast ==
- Jean-Claude Pascal as Dr. Pasucha
- Janie Murray as Binnie
- Joseph Offenbach as Dr. Himboldt - Studienrat
- Werner Peters as Hausach, 'König von St. Pauli'
- Charles Regnier as Nachtclub-Besitzer
- Alfred Schieske as Egon Mills
- Walter Bluhm as Schnapsbruder
- Ralf Schermuly as Harry
- Gernot Endemann as Herzberg, ein Primaner
- Kathrin Ackermann as Verena, Prostituierte
- Manfred Seipold as Willi, Harrys Bruder
- Inger Zielke as Inge Wolf
- Bernd Redecker as Robert, Inge Wolfs Freund
- Christa Siems as Binnies Mutter
- Rene Durand as Striptease-Lehrer
- Horst Hesslein as Leo, Clubbesitzer
- Helge Grau as Theo, ein Gangster
- Hans Waldherr as Bernie, ein Gangster
- Lova Moor as Self

== Bibliography ==
- James Robert Parish & Kingsley Canham. Film Directors Guide: Western Europe. Scarecrow Press, 1976.
