= Peer Schmidt =

German actor (1926–2010)

Peer Eugen Georg Schmidt (11 March 1926; Erfurt, Weimar Germany – 8 May 2010; Berlin) was a German actor who specialized in films, television and dubbing. He is best known as the German voice of Gérard Philipe, Marlon Brando and Jean-Paul Belmondo.

== Selected filmography ==
- 1953: The Venus of Tivoli - Erich Kube
- 1953: A Musical War of Love - Carlo Linetti
- 1953: Arlette Conquers Paris - Luc Lamballe
- 1953: Must We Get Divorced? - Theobald
- 1953: I and You - Charly
- 1953: Everything for Father - Ferry Stuck
- 1954: Der treue Husar
- 1954: The Gypsy Baron - Ottokar, Sekretär
- 1954: A House Full of Love - Billy
- 1954: Bon Voyage - Lutz Steffens
- 1955: The Double Husband - Heinz Krämer
- 1955: Heaven Is Never Booked Up - Robert
- 1955: Request Concert
- 1955: My Leopold - Leopold, sein Sohn
- 1955: Alibi - Benjamin Roland
- 1956: Die wilde Auguste - Erwin Knall
- 1956: Santa Lucia - Aristide
- 1956: Kitty and the Great Big World - Boris Malewsky - Reporter
- 1956: Die Rosel vom Schwarzwald - Oskar
- 1956: Uns gefällt die Welt - Charly
- 1957: The Winemaker of Langenlois - Richard Köster, ihr Neffe
- 1957: Confessions of Felix Krull - Marquis de Venosta
- 1957: The Schimeck Family - Dr. Kiesling, Advokat
- 1957: Lemke's Widow - Baron Nassen
- 1957: Der Stern von Afrika - Answald Sommer
- 1957: Wie schön, daß es dich gibt - Harry
- 1957: Junger Mann, der alles kann - Eugen, Musiker
- 1957: The Heart of St. Pauli - Harry Pingel
- 1957: Europas neue Musikparade 1958 - Paust
- 1958: Sehnsucht hat mich verführt - Paul Grigoleit
- 1959: Rendezvous in Vienna - Sascha
- 1959: The Night Before the Premiere - Heinz Schmitt
- 1959: Adorable Arabella - Gordon Blair
- 1960: Boomerang - Wachtmeister Meyer
- 1960: Ich schwöre und gelobe - Anton Roth
- 1960: Schlager-Raketen - Paul
- 1960: When the Heath Is in Bloom - Hein
- 1960: You Don't Shoot at Angels - Kommissar
- 1961: Frau Irene Besser
- 1961: Wie einst im Mai (TV Movie) - Fritz Jüterbog
- 1961: Bankraub in der Rue Latour - Alex
- 1961: Die Hazy Osterwald-Story - Jupp, Klarinettist
- 1961: Golden Boy (TV Movie) - Siggie
- 1962: Genosse Münchhausen - Boris
- 1962: So toll wie anno dazumal - Rolf Wilden
- 1962: The Gypsy Baron - Ernö
- 1962: His Best Friend - Pat Nicot
- 1964: The Monster of London City - Teddy Flynn
- 1966: Operation Yellow Viper
- 1968: Von Mäusen und Menschen (TV Movie) - George
- 1969: Monte Carlo or Bust! - Otto
- 1971: Hurray We Are Bachelors Again - Willi Kusche
- 1971: X312 - Flight to Hell - Tom Nilson - Reporter (German voice, uncredited)
- 1972: Hofball bei Zille (TV Movie) - Emil
- 1974: Der kleine Doktor (TV Series, 13 episodes) - Dr. Jean Dollent
- 1977: Sanfter Schrecken (TV Movie) - Braumüller
- 1980–1981: Café Wernicke (TV series, 20 episodes) - Franz Lampe
- 1981: Das waren noch Zeiten (TV Movie) - Johann Kalke
- 1983: Schwarzfahrer
- 1985: Schwarzer Lohn und weiße Weste - König
- 1987: Love Jogging (TV Movie) - George
