= Heinz Schimmelpfennig =

German actor

- Born: 6 April 1919; Berlin, Germany
- Died: 31 December 2010 (aged 91); Gernsbach, Germany
- Years active: 1951-1996

Heinz Schimmelpfennig (6 April 1919 – 31 December 2010) was a German actor and director.

After leaving school, Schimmelpfennig trained as a designer until 1939. He then joined as a soldier in World War II, before being wounded in 1942 and leaving the forces.

After his recovery, he found a job as a camera assistant at the UFA in Babelsberg. He then realised that he wanted to become an actor himself, so in 1943, he studied two years of studying acting at the Max Reinhardt Seminar in Vienna.

== Films ==
- The Blacksmith of St. Bartholomae, Hans, smuggler, 1955
- Terror After Midnight, Inspector Hopkins, 1962
