= Everything for Father =

1953 film

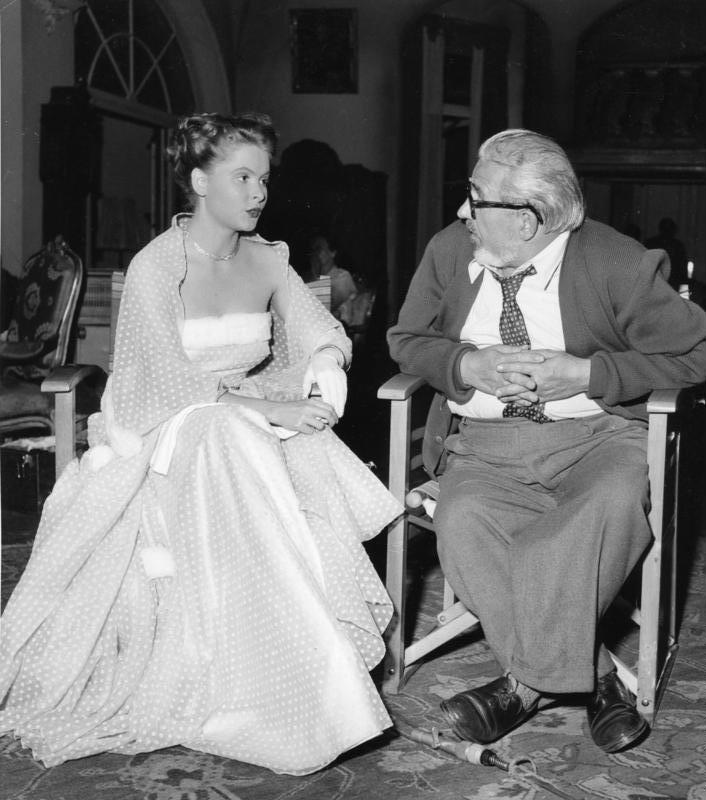
- Actress Johanna Matz and director Karl Hartl
- Directed by: Karl Hartl
- Written by: Karl Hartl; Hugo Maria Kritz
- Produced by: Luggi Waldleitner
- Starring: Johanna Matz; Curd Jürgens; Peer Schmidt
- Cinematography: Oskar Schnirch
- Edited by: Walter Fredersdorf
- Music by: Lotar Olias
- Production company: Vita-Film
- Distributed by: Deutsche London-Film
- Release date: 22 December 1953
- Running time: 92 minutes
- Country: West Germany
- Language: German

Everything for Father (German: Alles für Papa) is a 1953 West German comedy film directed by Karl Hartl and starring Johanna Matz, Curd Jürgens, and Peer Schmidt. It was shot at the Göttingen Studios. The film's sets were designed by the art director Gabriel Pellon.

== Cast ==
- Johanna Matz as Charlott Haberland
- Curd Jürgens as Clemens Haberland
- Peer Schmidt as Ferry Stuck
- Olga Chekhova as Frau von Pleskow
- Ina Malfatti as Olga von Pleskow
- Walter Janssen as Severin
- Hedwig Wangel as Klara
- Käthe Haack
- Edelweiß Malchin as Fifi
- Franz Schafheitlin as Betriebsdirektor
- Werner Stock as Chefredakteur
- Viktor Afritsch as Herr von Stubbenbergh
- Harry Hardt as Mucky
- Madelon Truß as Direktionssekretärin

== Bibliography ==
- Bock, Hans-Michael; Bergfelder, Tim, eds. (2009). The Concise Cinegraph: Encyclopaedia of German Cinema. New York: Berghahn Books. ISBN 978-1-57181-655-9.
