= Rolf Zehetbauer =

German production designer (1929–2022)

- Born: 13 February 1929; Munich, Bavaria, Germany
- Died: 23 January 2022 (aged 92)
- Occupations: Production designer; Art director; Set decorator
- Years active: 1948–2003

Rolf Zehetbauer (13 February 1929 – 23 January 2022) was a German production designer, art director and set decorator. Zehetbauer won an Academy Award in the category Best Art Direction for the film Cabaret. He died on 23 January 2022, at the age of 92.

== Selected filmography ==
- I'll Make You Happy (1949)
- Love and Blood (1951)
- The Imaginary Invalid (1952)
- Knall and Fall as Detectives (1953)
- The Charming Young Lady (1953)
- The Telephone Operator (1954)
- The Mosquito (1954)
- Love Without Illusions (1955)
- Alibi (1955)
- Love (1956)
- As Long as the Heart Still Beats (1958)
- Adorable Arabella (1959)
- My Schoolfriend (1960)
- Murder Party (1961)
- The Bird Seller (1962)
- My Daughter and I (1963)
- I Learned It from Father (1964)
- A Man in His Prime (1964)
- Raumpatrouille - Die phantastischen Abenteuer des Raumschiffes Orion (1965)
- The Last Escape (1970)
- Cabaret (1972)
- Cry of the Black Wolves (1972)
- Twilight's Last Gleaming (1977)
- The Serpent's Egg (1977)
- Das Boot (1981)
- Querelle (1982)
- The NeverEnding Story (1984)
- Enemy Mine (1985)

== See also ==
- List of German-speaking Academy Award winners and nominees

== Notes ==
- Bock, Hans-Michael; Bergfelder, Tim, eds. (2009). The Concise Cinegraph: Encyclopaedia of German Cinema. New York: Berghahn Books. ISBN 978-1-57181-655-9.
