= Ingrid – Die Geschichte eines Fotomodells =

1955 film

- Directed by: Géza von Radványi
- Written by: Gerda Corbett; Joachim Wedekind
- Produced by: Filmaufbau
- Starring: Johanna Matz; Paul Hubschmid; Louis de Funès
- Music by: Hans-Martin Majewski
- Release date: 21 January 1955 (France)
- Running time: 110 minutes
- Country: West Germany
- Language: German

Ingrid – Die Geschichte eines Fotomodells (English: Ingrid – The Story of a Fashion Model) is a German comedy film from 1955, directed by Géza von Radványi, written by Gerda Corbett, starring Johanna Matz, Paul Hubschmid and Louis de Funès.

== Cast ==
- Johanna Matz as Ingrid
- Paul Hubschmid as Robert, journalist
- Louis de Funès as D'Arrigio, fashion designer
- Erni Mangold as Ingrid's sister "Hanne"
- Joseph Offenbach as Mr Moga
- Paul Edwin Roth as Walter, press photographer
- Franz Schafheithin as headmistress of a school for models
- Alice Treff as the female director
- Jens Andersen
- Horst Beck
- Isolde Bräuner as a model
- Elly Brugmer as Ingrid's aunt
- Mickael Burk
- Marion Carr
- Gerda Corbett
- Georg Edert
- Hans Friedrich
- Harry Gondi
- Linda Geiser
