= Arlette Conquers Paris =

1953 film by Victor Tourjansky

- Directed by: Viktor Tourjansky
- Written by: Hans Fritz Beckmann; Frank F. Braun (novel); Heinz Coubier; Werner Jacobs
- Produced by: Carl Wilhelm Tetting
- Starring: Johanna Matz; Karlheinz Böhm; Claus Biederstaedt
- Music by: Peter Kreuder
- Production company: Rotary-Film
- Distributed by: Deutsche London-Film
- Release date: 1 September 1953
- Running time: 99 minutes
- Country: West Germany
- Language: German

Arlette Conquers Paris (German: Arlette erobert Paris) is a 1953 West German comedy film directed by Viktor Tourjansky and starring Johanna Matz, Karlheinz Böhm and Claus Biederstaedt. It was shot at the Babelsberg Studios and on location in Paris. The film's sets were designed by the art directors Franz Bi and Bruno Monden.

== Synopsis ==
Arlette, a country girl and illegitimate daughter of the minister of justice, travels to Paris for the first time. An accordion player, she hopes to make a career in music. She unwittingly escapes Gérard Laurent, the civil service minder her father has secretly sent to watch her, and falls in with some bohemians from Montmartre. After Arlette and her friends get arrested for busking, she meets and falls in love with Gérard. Her father's resignation from his position at last allows him to acknowledge her.

== Cast ==
- Johanna Matz as Arlette
  - Renée Franke as Arlette's singing voice
- Paul Dahlke as Justizminister
- Karlheinz Böhm as Gérard Laurent
- Peer Schmidt as Luc Lamballe
- Claus Biederstaedt as Student Marc Tissier
- Werner Lieven as M. Boiret
- Erni Mangold as Mariilou Bergeret
- Gert Fröbe as Manager Edmond Duval
- Rudolf Vogel as Kunsthändler Jean Maurot
- Kurt Großkurth as Kommissar
- Lina Carstens as Concierge Frau Pézat
- Paula Menari as La Putzfrau
- Alfred Menhardt as Kunsthändler Jean Pommart
- Ulrich Bettac
- Doris Kirchner
- Arnulf Schröder

== Bibliography ==
- Bock, Hans-Michael & Bergfelder, Tim. The Concise CineGraph. Encyclopedia of German Cinema. Berghahn Books, 2009.
