= The Man Who Wanted to Live Twice =

1950 film directed by Viktor Tourjansky

- Directed by: Viktor Tourjansky
- Written by: Harald Braun; Heinz Pauck
- Starring: Rudolf Forster; Olga Chekhova; Heidemarie Hatheyer
- Cinematography: Konstantin Irmen-Tschet
- Music by: Lothar Brühne
- Production company: Neue Deutsche Filmgesellschaft
- Distributed by: Bavaria Film
- Release date: 15 September 1950
- Running time: 90 minutes
- Country: West Germany
- Language: German

The Man Who Wanted to Live Twice (German: Der Mann, der zweimal leben wollte) is a 1950 West German drama film directed by Viktor Tourjansky and starring Rudolf Forster, Olga Chekhova and Heidemarie Hatheyer. The future star Marianne Koch made her debut in this film, having been discovered by the director while working at the Bavaria Studios in Munich. The film's sets were designed by the art directors Franz Bi and Botho Hoefer. It was shot at the Bavaria Studios in Munich.

== Synopsis ==
Professor Hesse, the chief physician at a clinic, has a very comfortable existence with his loving wife Irene and two children. Yet he is dissatisfied with his life, and believes he has a right to achieve more. He fakes his death in a car accident with the knowledge only of his attractive secretary and mistress Maria.

His plans to escape abroad are thwarted and he finds himself in a moral dilemma when he hears his son is ill needing medical treatment. He returns to the clinic, but now finds he has been replaced completely in professional and private terms.

== Cast ==
- Rudolf Forster as Professor Hesse
- Olga Chekhova as Irene Hesse
- Heidemarie Hatheyer as Maria Monnard
- Ilse Steppat as Oberschwester Hilde
- Rolf von Nauckhoff as Dr. Ihlenfeld
- Helmuth Rudolph as Lorheden
- Dieter Suchsland as Kai Hesse
- Marianne Koch as Katja Hesse
- Joseph Offenbach
- Peter Lühr
- Gunnar Möller
- Wastl Witt
- Helga Lehn
- Dieter von der Recke

== Bibliography ==
- Hans-Michael Bock and Tim Bergfelder. The Concise Cinegraph: An Encyclopedia of German Cinema. Berghahn Books, 2009.
