= Mrs. Warren's Profession (film) =

1960 film

Mrs. Warren's Profession/Frau Warrens Gewerbe
- Directed by: Ákos Ráthonyi
- Written by: Eberhard Keindorff; Johanna Sibelius; Anatole de Grunwald
- Based on: Mrs. Warren's Profession by George Bernard Shaw
- Produced by: Walter Koppel
- Starring: Lilli Palmer; O. E. Hasse; Johanna Matz
- Cinematography: Albert Benitz
- Edited by: Alice Ludwig
- Music by: Siegfried Franz
- Production companies: Real-Film; Cinecustodia AG
- Release date: 12 January 1960 (Hannover)
- Running time: 103 minutes
- Countries: West Germany; Switzerland

Mrs. Warren's Profession (German: Frau Warrens Gewerbe) is a 1960 West German drama film directed by Ákos Ráthonyi and starring Lilli Palmer, O. E. Hasse and Johanna Matz. It is an adaptation of George Bernard Shaw's 1894 play Mrs. Warren's Profession.

== Cast ==
- Lilli Palmer – Mrs. Kitty Warren
- O.E. Hasse – Sir George Crofts
- Johanna Matz – Vivie Warren
- Helmuth Lohner – Frank Gardner
- Rudolf Vogel – Rev. Samuel Gardner
- Ernst Fritz Fürbringer – Praed
- Elisabeth Flickenschildt – Mother Warren
- Erni Mangold – Liz
- Christiane Nielsen – Manon
- Anneli Sauli – Mary

== Notes ==
=== Bibliography ===
- Bergfelder, Tim & Bock, Hans-Michael. The Concise Cinegraph: Encyclopedia of German Cinema. Berghahn Books, 2009.
