= The Fox of Paris =

- Directed by: Paul May
- Written by: Herbert B. Fredersdorf; Herbert Reinecker
- Produced by: Kurt Ulrich
- Starring: Martin Held; Marianne Koch; Hardy Krüger
- Cinematography: Georg Bruckbauer
- Edited by: Klaus Eckstein
- Music by: Hans-Martin Majewski
- Production companies: Kurt Ulrich Filmproduktion; Comptoir d'Expansion Cinématographique
- Distributed by: Constantin Film
- Release date: 14 November 1957
- Running time: 98 minutes
- Countries: France; West Germany
- Language: German

The Fox of Paris (German: Der Fuchs von Paris) is a 1957 war thriller film directed by Paul May and starring Martin Held, Marianne Koch and Hardy Krüger. It was a co-production between France and West Germany.

It was shot at the Tempelhof Studios in Berlin and on location in Paris. The film's sets were designed by the art directors Hans Kuhnert and Wilhelm Vorwerg.

== Cast ==
- Martin Held as Gen. Quade
- Marianne Koch as Yvonne
- Hardy Krüger as Capt. Fürstenwerth
- Michel Auclair as André
- Paul Hartmann as Col. Gen. von der Heinitz
- Viktor Staal as Col. Toller
- Peter Mosbacher as Maj. Wedekind
- Jean Murat as Yvonne's Father
- Jean-Paul Roussillon as Francois, Yvonne's Brother
- Jean Vinci as Col. Robbins
- Walter Gross as Kleinschmidt
- Hans Waldemar Anders as Gen. Dörffler
- Reinhard Kolldehoff as Werner Biener, SD-Beamter
- Erik von Loewis as Gen. Eisner
- Wolfgang Völz as Manfred Däubele, SD-Beamter
- Gerd Martienzen as Militär-Geistlicher
- Joachim Boldt as Capt. Salter

== Bibliography ==
- Bock, Hans-Michael & Bergfelder, Tim. The Concise CineGraph. Encyclopedia of German Cinema. Berghahn Books, 2009.
