= As Long as the Heart Still Beats =

1958 film

- Directed by: Alfred Weidenmann
- Written by: Herbert Reinecker
- Produced by: Walter Ulbrich
- Starring: O.E. Hasse; Heidemarie Hatheyer; Hans Christian Blech
- Cinematography: Igor Oberberg
- Edited by: Lilian Seng
- Music by: Hans-Martin Majewski
- Production company: UFA
- Distributed by: UFA
- Release date: 27 December 1958
- Running time: 93 minutes
- Country: West Germany
- Language: German

As Long as the Heart Still Beats (German: Solange das Herz schlägt) is a 1958 West German drama film directed by Alfred Weidenmann and starring O.E. Hasse, Heidemarie Hatheyer and Hans Christian Blech. It was shot at the Tempelhof Studios in Berlin while Location shooting took place around Stuttgart. The film's sets were designed by the art director Rolf Zehetbauer. It premiered at the Gloria-Palast in West Berlin.

== Cast ==
- O.E. Hasse as Dr. Hans Römer
- Heidemarie Hatheyer as Frau Römer
- Hans Christian Blech as Dr. Laue
- Grit Boettcher as Renate Römer
- Götz George as Eberhard Römer
- Eva Katharina Schultz as Frau Laue
- Charles Regnier as Mr. Kenneweg, the chemist teacher
- Friedrich Maurer as Mr. Stubenrauch, The maths teacher
- Anneliese Book as Fraülein Anna Sailer
- Ernst Schröder as Franke
- Folker Bohnet as Werner Franke
- Ludwig Linkmann as Dr. Bernburg
- Siegfried Schürenberg as Dr. Wieler
- Ruth Scheerbarth as Dr. Wessum
- Ursula Herking as Fraülein Hirschfeld
- Ruth Jacobi as Fraülein Müninger

== Bibliography ==
- Davidson, John & Hake, Sabine. Framing the Fifties: Cinema in a Divided Germany. Berghahn Books, 2007.
- Rother, Rainer (ed.) German Film: From the Archives of the Deutsche Kinemathek. Hatje Cantz Verlag, 2024.
