= Heidemarie Hatheyer =

Austrian actress (1918–1990)

- Born: 8 April 1918; Villach, Carinthia, Austria-Hungary
- Died: 11 May 1990 (aged 72); Zürich, Switzerland
- Occupation: Actress
- Years active: 1938–1988

Heidemarie Hatheyer (8 April 1918 – 11 May 1990) was an Austrian film actress. She appeared in 43 films between 1938 and 1988.

== Filmography ==
- The Mountain Calls (1938) - Felicitas
- Frau Sixta (1938) - Anna, Kellnerin
- Between River and Steppe (1939) - Maria
- Ein ganzer Kerl [A Real Man] (1939) - Jule
- The Vulture Wally (1940) - Wally Fender, die "Geierwally"
- Ich klage an [I Accuse] (1941) - Hanna Heyt
- The Night in Venice (1942) - Annemarie Pleß, Stenotypistin
- Der große Schatten (1942) - Gisela Ahrens
- Don't Talk to Me About Love (1943) - Pamela Keith
- Axel an der Himmelstür (1944)
- The Years Pass (1945) - Frau Irene Behrendsen
- Where the Trains Go (1949) - Fanny Förster
- Encounter with Werther (1949) - Lotte
- This Man Belongs to Me (1950) - Fita Busse
- Mathilde Möhring (1950) - Mathilde Möhring
- Regimental Music (1950) - Gabriele von Wahl
- The Man Who Wanted to Live Twice (1950) - Maria Monnard
- Chased by the Devil (1950) - Maria Hendrix
- Dr. Holl (1951) - Helga Roemer
- Desires (1952) - Anna Falkner
- Don't Ask My Heart (1952) - Anna Lohmann
- Anna Louise and Anton (1953) - Frau Gast - Antons Mutter
- Sauerbruch – Das war mein Leben (1954) - Olga Ahrends
- Love Without Illusions (1955) - Christa
- Die Ratten (1955) - Anna John
- You Can No Longer Remain Silent (1955) - Salvör
- The Marriage of Doctor Danwitz (1956) - Christa Hambach
- Skandal um Dr. Vlimmen (1956) - Truus Dautzenberg
- Der Meineidbauer (1956) - Paula Roth
- Rütting in Glücksritter (1957) - Renate Bergmann
- And Lead Us Not Into Temptation (1957) - Frau Hudetz
- As Long as the Heart Still Beats (1958) - Frau Römer
- The Cry of the Wild Geese (1961) - Amelia Gare
- Legend of a Gunfighter (1964) - Ann Bradley
- Die Herausforderung (1975, TV Movie) - Lisa Sander
- On Mount Chimborazo (1977, TV Movie) - Dorothea
- Martha Jellneck (1988) - Martha Jellneck
