= Hände hoch! =

- Directed by: Alfred Weidenmann
- Written by: Alfred Weidenmann
- Starring: Erich Dunskus; Willy Witte; Johannes Schütz
- Cinematography: Emil Schünemann
- Music by: Horst Hanns Sieber
- Production company: Deutsche Filmherstellungs- und Verwertungs-GmbH (DFG)
- Release date: 22 October 1942; (Berlin)
- Running time: 67 minutes
- Country: Germany

Hände hoch! (German for "Hands up!") is a 1942 German Nazi propaganda film directed and written by Alfred Weidenmann. The film portrays life in a Kinderlandverschickung (KLV) camp for evacuated German children in Slovakia during World War II. A scholarly study of cinematographer Emil Schünemann describes the film as a Hitler Youth drama shot in occupied Slovakia and commissioned for the DFG and the NSDAP’s film propaganda apparatus.

== Plot ==
Set around a KLV camp in Slovakia, the film focuses on a group of German boys and presents the camp as a safe, orderly environment removed from the war.

== Cast ==
- Erich Dunskus
- Willy Witte
- Johannes Schütz

== Production ==
Hände hoch! was produced by the DFG, and filmed in occupied Slovakia, with cinematography by Emil Schünemann.

== Release and classification ==
The film premiered in Berlin on 22 October 1942.

In Nazi-era classification systems, it received state predicates including staatspolitisch und künstlerisch wertvoll (politically and artistically valuable), jugendwert (youth-approved), and Lehrfilm (instructional film).

== Reception ==
A contemporary press note reproduced on filmportal.de framed the film as showing parents "a peaceful, carefree life" for their children at a Hitler Youth camp in the Carpathians.

A 1943 parent newsletter for the expanded KLV program (Sachsengruß) discussed the film’s circulation through party and Hitler Youth screenings, and claimed it had won the "Doktor-Goebbels-Preis" at the 1942 European youth film competition in Florence.

== See also ==
- Kinderlandverschickung
- Hitler Youth
- Nazi propaganda
