= Martin Held =

German actor (1908–1992)

- Born: 11 November 1908; Berlin-Wedding; Germany
- Died: 31 January 1992 (aged 83); Berlin; Germany
- Occupation: Film actor
- Years active: 1951–1987

Martin Held (1908–1992) was a German television and film actor.

== Partial filmography ==
- Dark Eyes (1951) - Alexander Grabner
- Homesick for You (1952) - Direktor Petermann
- Canaris Master Spy (1954) - Obergruppenfuehrer Heydrich
- Alibi (1955) - Dr. Kurt Overbeck
- Before Sundown (1956) - Erich Klamroth
- The Captain from Köpenick (1956) - Dr. Obermüller
- Friederike von Barring (1956) - Falkenstein
- Spy for Germany (1956) - Erich Gimpel
- Banktresor 713 (1957) - Herbert Burkhardt
- The Fox of Paris (1957) - Gen. Quade
- Nasser Asphalt (Wet Asphalt) (1958) - Cesar Boyd
- My Daughter Patricia (1959) - Heinz Roland, Apotheker
- Roses for the Prosecutor (1959) - Oberstaatsanwalt Dr. Wilhelm Schramm
- Boomerang (1960) - Hauptkommissar Stern
- The Last Witness (1960) - Direktor Werner Rameil
- The Marriage of Mr. Mississippi (1961) - Frédéric René Saint-Claude
- The Last of Mrs. Cheyney (1961) - Charles
- The Dream of Lieschen Mueller (1961) - Dr. Schmidt
- Terror After Midnight (1962) - Charles Elgin
- Black-White-Red Four Poster (1962) - Friedrich de Wehrt
- Love Has to Be Learned (1963) - Christoph Mylius
- A Nearly Decent Girl (1963) - Robert Steckler
- And So to Bed (1963) - Rektor
- Condemned to Sin (1964) - Hugo Starosta
- Long Legs, Long Fingers (1966) - Baron Holberg
- The Oldest Profession (1967) - Edouard (segment "Belle époque, La")
- Fast ein Held (1967) - Karl Küppes
- Dr. Fabian: Laughing Is the Best Medicine (1969) - Professor Dr. Dr. Felix Spalke
- Gentlemen in White Vests (1970) - Oberlandesgerichtsrat a. D. Herbert Zänker
- Hauptsache Ferien (1972) - Professor Hebbel
- Night Flight from Moscow (1973) - Lepke
- Disorder and Early Torment (1977) - Prof. Abel Cornelius
- The Pentecost Outing (1978) - Heinrich Johannsen
- The Abduction of the Sabine Women (1983, TV film) - Prof. Martin Gollwitz
- Was zu beweisen war (1986, TV film) - Wilhelm Kaiser
