= Marianne Koch =

German actress (born 1931)

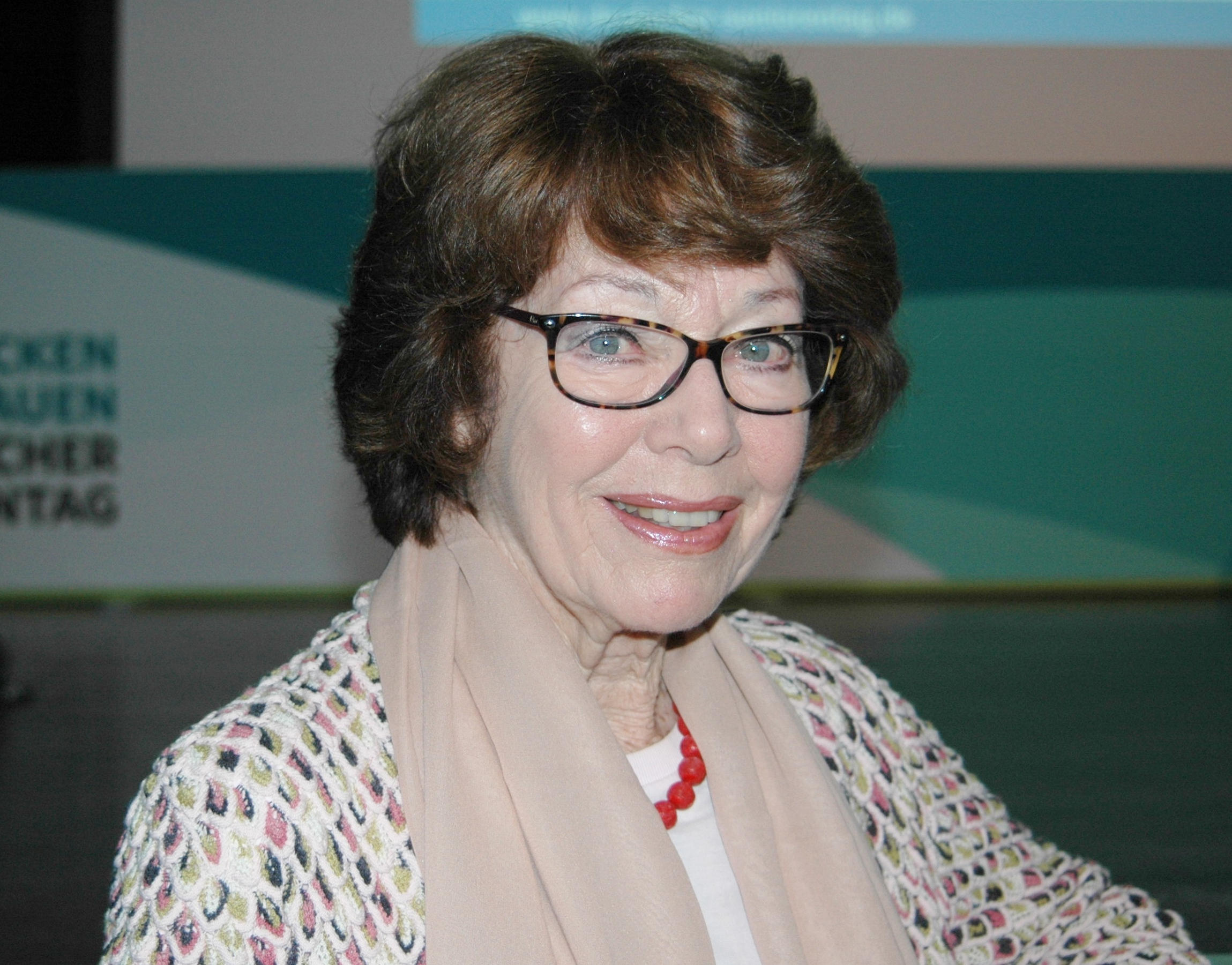
- Koch in 2018
- Born: 19 August 1931 (age 95); Munich, Germany
- Years active: 1950–1971
- Spouse: Gerhard Freund (m. 1953; div. 1973)
- Partner(s): Peter Hamm (c. 1970s; d. 2019)
- Children: 2 (with Freund)

Marianne Koch (German: [maˈʁi̯anə ˈkɔx]; born 19 August 1931) is a German retired actress, best known for her appearances in Spaghetti Westerns and adventure films of the 1960s. She later worked as a television host and as a physician.

== Career ==
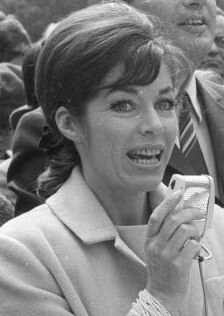
Koch in 1968

Between 1950 and 1971, Koch appeared in more than 65 films. She had numerous leading roles in the German cinema of the 1950s and 1960s. In the 1954 American thriller Night People, she appeared in a supporting role alongside Gregory Peck. Koch also had major roles in the Hollywood films Four Girls in Town and Interlude, both released in 1957. She remains perhaps best known internationally for Sergio Leone's 1964 production A Fistful of Dollars, which showcased her with Clint Eastwood as a civilian tormented by ruthless local gangsters, torn between her husband and child and the villains.

In Germany, she was probably best known for her many years of participation as one of the regular panelists in the highly popular TV game show Was bin ich?, the German adaption of the American TV show What's My Line?, which ran from the 1950s until 1988 and achieved ratings of up to 75% at its peak.

In 1971, she resumed the medical studies she had broken off in the early 1950s to become an actress. In 1974, she earned her degree and practiced medicine until 1997 as a specialist for internal medicine in Munich. Also in 1974, she was one of the initial hosts of Germany's pioneering talk show 3 nach 9 (Three After Nine), for which she was awarded the Grimme-Preis, one of the most prestigious awards of the German television industry. She also hosted other television shows and had a medical advice program on Bayern 2 radio from 2000 to September 2025.

== Personal life ==
Koch is the daughter of Marie Aumüller and Rudolf Schindler.

In 1953, Koch married the physician Gerhard Freund (1922–2008), with whom she has two sons and later four grandchildren. The marriage ended in 1973 after Freund began an affair with Miss World 1956, Petra Schürmann, whom he later wed. Koch later began a relationship with the writer Peter Hamm, which lasted from the mid-1970s until his death in 2019.

== Films ==
- The Man Who Wanted to Live Twice (1950) – Katja Hesse
- Czardas of Hearts (1951) – Reporterin
- Dr. Holl (1951) – Anna
- The Secret of a Marriage (1951) – Musi Camphausen
- My Friend the Thief (1951) – Resl
- The Chaste Libertine (1952) – Gerty Seibold
- Dark Clouds Over the Dachstein (1953) – Christl, die junge Magd
- Scandal at the Girls' School (1953) – Marina von Leithen
- The Monastery's Hunter (1953) – Gittli
- The Poacher (1953) – Ursula
- Love and Trumpets (1954) – Bettina von Brixen
- Night People (1954) – Kathy Gerhardt
- Hubertus Castle (1954) – Geislein
- Bruder Martin (1954) – Rosl
- Ludwig II (1955) – Prinzessin Sophie
- Des Teufels General (1955) – Dorothea 'Diddo' Geiss
- The Blacksmith of St. Bartholomae (1955) – Marianne
- The Royal Waltz (1955) – Therese
- As Long as You Live (1955) – Teresa
- Zwei blaue Augen (1955) – Christiane Neubert
- The Marriage of Doctor Danwitz (1956) – Edith Danwitz – Mannequin
- If We All Were Angels (1956) – Elisabeth Kempenich
- Four Girls in Town (1957) – Ina Schiller
- Salzburg Stories (1957) – Konstanze
- Der Stern von Afrika (1957) – Brigitte
- Vater sein dagegen sehr (1957) – Margot Ventura geb. Sonnemann
- Interlude (1957) – Reni Fischer
- The Fox of Paris (1957) – Yvonne
- The Italians They Are Crazy (1958) – Cristina
- … und nichts als die Wahrheit (1958) – Mingo Fabian
- Die Landärztin (1958) – Dr. Petra Jensen
- Frau im besten Mannesalter (1959) – Carola Hauff
- The Woman by the Dark Window (1960) – Luise Konradin
- Heldinnen (1960) – Minna von Barnhelm
- Mit Himbeergeist geht alles besser (1960) – Hilde von Hessenlohe
- Spotlight on a Murderer (1961) – Edwige
- Blind Justice (1961) – Ingrid Hansen
- Napoleon II, the Eagle (1961) – Kaiserin Marie Louise
- Die Fledermaus (1962) – Rosalinde
- The Hot Port of Hong Kong (1962) – Joan Kent
- Liebling, ich muß dich erschießen (1962) – Jeannine Messmer
- The Devil's Agent (1962) – Nora Gulden
- Tim Frazer (1963, TV miniseries) – Helen Baker
- The Black Panther of Ratana (1963) – Dr. Marina Keller
- Death Drums Along the River (1963) – Dr. Inge Jung
- The Last Ride to Santa Cruz (1964) – Elizabeth Kelly
- The Monster of London City (1964) – Ann Morlay
- A Fistful of Dollars (1964) – Marisol
- Frozen Alive (1964) – Dr. Helen Wieland
- Trunk to Cairo (1965) – Helga Schlieben
- Coast of Skeletons (1965) – Helga
- The Hell of Manitoba (1965) – Jade Grande
- Sunscorched (1965) – Anna-Lisa
- Sandy the Seal (1965) – Karen Van Heerden (released in 1969)
- Who Killed Johnny R.? (1966) – Bea Bordet
- Clint the Stranger (1967) – Julie Harrison
- Der Tod läuft hinterher (1967, TV miniseries) – Mary Hotkins
- The Unnaturals (1969) – Mrs. Vivian Taylor
- Die Journalistin (1970–1971, TV series, 13 episodes) – Renate Albrecht
- Reserl am Hofe (1984) – Narrator

== External links and sources ==
- Marianne Koch at IMDb
- Marianne Koch at the TCM Movie Database (archived)
- Literature by and about Marianne Koch in the German National Library catalogue
- Photos of the shooting of the film 'Solange du lebst'
