= Erni Mangold =

Austrian actress (1927–2026)

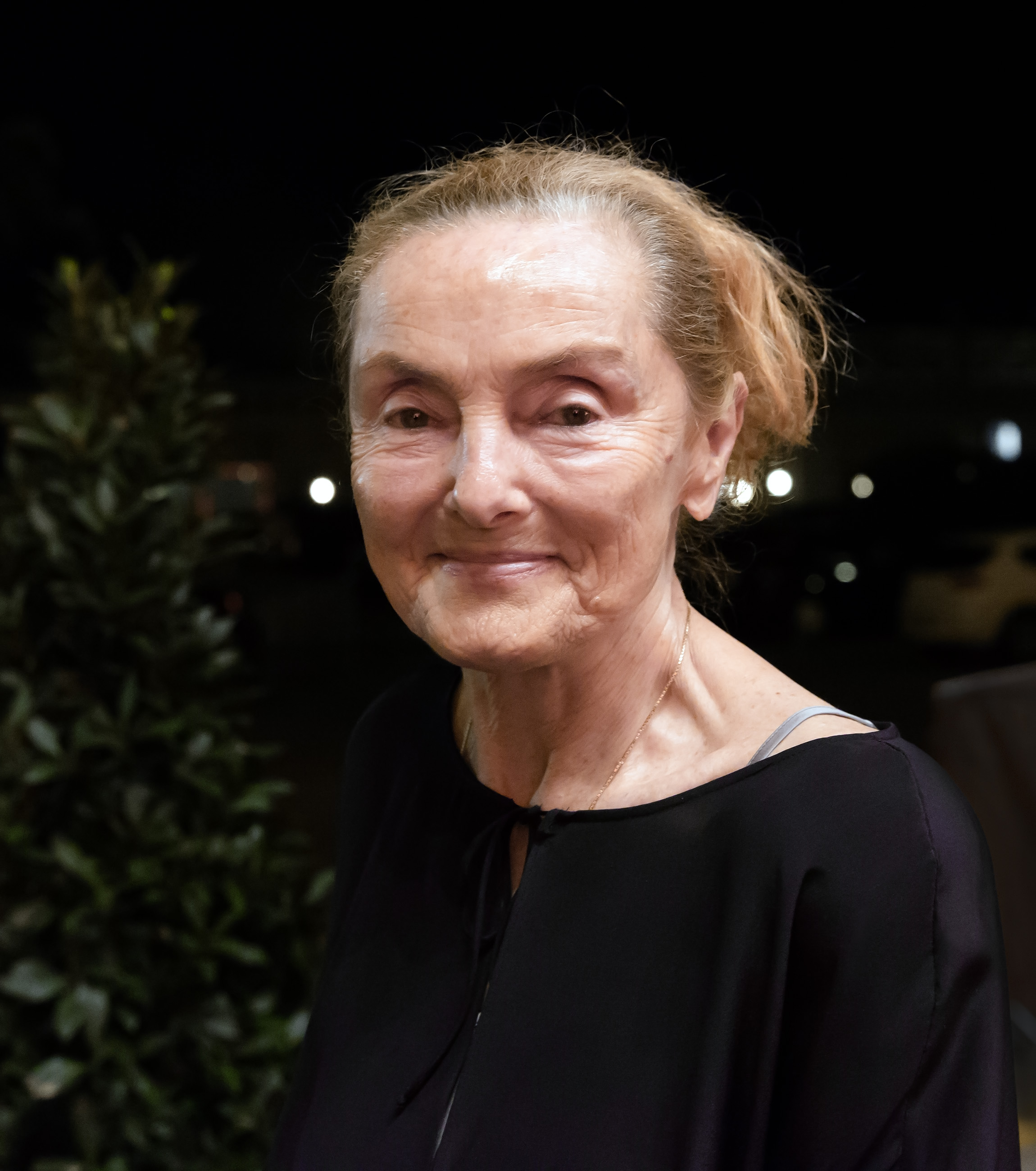
- Mangold in 2015
- Born: Erna Goldmann; 26 January 1927; Großweikersdorf, Lower Austria, Austria
- Died: 5 September 2026 (aged 99); Vienna, Austria
- Occupation: Actress
- Years active: 1946–2023

Ernestine Mangold (born Erna Goldmann; 26 January 1927 – 5 September 2026) was an Austrian actress and stage director. She appeared in more than 140 films and television productions. She was awarded the title Kammerschauspielerin.

== Life and career ==
Mangold was born Erna Goldmann in Großweikersdorf, Austria, on 26 January 1927 into a family of artists. Her father was a painter while her mother was slated to become a successful concert pianist but chose to give up her career in favour of taking care of her family. Mangold had piano lessons from age 4 to 14.

After being trained at Helmut Kraus's drama school, Mangold performed at Vienna's Theater in der Josefstadt from 1946 to 1956. Between 1955 and 1963, Gustaf Gründgens engaged her for Deutsches Schauspielhaus in Hamburg, and afterwards, she appeared at the Düsseldorfer Schauspielhaus under Karl Heinz Stroux. From 1972, she worked at Salzburg Mozarteum, and later, she taught at the Helmut Kraus's Drama School and at the Max Reinhardt Seminar. From 1984 to 1995, she was a professor at the University of Music and Performing Arts, Vienna. She retired from the stage in December 2017, aged 90, having performed the role of Maude in a production of Harold and Maude one last time.

Her career as a film and television actress spanned across 70 years and included more than 140 film and television productions. One of her better-known roles was the mistress of Hanussen in the 1955 film of the same title. Her most memorable performance in international film productions was the role of a palm reader in Richard Linklater's Before Sunrise (1995).

Mangold worked with Romy Schneider, O. W. Fischer, Helmut Qualtinger oder Rainer Werner Fassbinder.

From 1958 to 1978, Mangold was married to German actor Heinz Reincke. She lived in Sankt Leonhard am Hornerwald, Lower Austria. In 2011, she published her memoirs, titled Lassen Sie mich in Ruhe, which is translated colloquially as "Get Off My Back!". In 2012, a dead-end street in Sankt Leonhard am Hornerwald was named "Prof.-Erni-Mangold-Weg" after her.

Mangold died in Vienna on 5 September 2026 at the age of 99.

== Selected filmography ==
Sources:

- 1948: The Other Life – Mizzi
- 1948: The Angel with the Trumpet – Martha Monica Alt
- 1949: Lambert Feels Threatened
- 1949: Dear Friend – Doris Thaller
- 1950: Großstadtnacht – Susi
- 1952: Abenteuer im Schloss – Mizzi
- 1953: Die Fiakermilli – Antonie Mannsfeld
- 1953: Lavender – Susanne
- 1953: The Bird Seller – Ernestine
- 1953: Arlette Conquers Paris – Mariilou Bergeret
- 1953: The Last Waltz
- 1954: Ein Haus voll Liebe
- 1954: The Forester of the Silver Wood – Karin
- 1955: Ingrid – Die Geschichte eines Fotomodells – Hanne, Ingrid's Sister
- 1955: Der falsche Adam – Dolly Dobbs
- 1955: Hanussen – Priscilla Pletzak
- 1956: And Who Is Kissing Me? – Liane Neubert
- 1956: The Marriage of Doctor Danwitz – Jutta, Mannequin
- 1956: Lügen haben hübsche Beine
- 1956: Skandal um Dr. Vlimmen – Mientje
- 1956: A Heart Returns Home – Maxie Mell
- 1956: Uns gefällt die Welt – Lisa
- 1957: Tolle Nacht – Mannequin Ingrid Mai
- 1958: The Muzzle – Gutsituierte Dame
- 1959: Eva – Mizzi Schranz
- 1960: Storm in a Water Glass – Lisa
- 1960: Aufruhr (TV film) – Josie Flint
- 1960: Mrs. Warren's Profession – Liz
- 1966: Hafenpolizei: Der Nerz (TV series episode) – Tilda Faller
- 1966: Die Hinrichtung (TV film) – Frau Reindl
- 1967: When Night Falls on the Reeperbahn – Wanda
- 1970: Der Kommissar: Die kleine Schubelik (TV series episode) – Martha Schubelik
- 1970: Das Geld liegt auf der Bank (TV film) – Anna Dietrich / Erna Dietrich
- 1972: Sie nannten ihn Krambambuli – Emma Jellinek
- 1972: Der letzte Werkelmann – Franzi
- 1972: Kinderarzt Dr. Fröhlich – Thussy Zwiesel
- 1974: Tatort: Mord im Ministerium (TV series episode) – Kora Wiesiewicz
- 1976: Tea for Three
- 1979: Kassbach – Seine Bekanntschaften
- 1981: Der Bockerer – Besitzerin des Café Tosca
- 1981: Den Tüchtigen gehört die Welt – Wirtin
- 1982: Zeitgenossen
- 1983: Tramps – Willies Bekanntschaft
- 1986: Mit meinen heißen Tränen (TV miniseries)
- 1993: Das Geheimnis – Anna Bäumer
- 1994: Kommissar Rex: Der Tod der alten Damen (TV series episode)
- 1995: Before Sunrise – Palm Reader
- 1995: Kommissar Rex: Gefährliche Jagd (TV series episode) – Frau Groh
- 1997: Qualtingers Wien – Praterfee
- 1998: Kommissar Rex: Mosers Tod (TV series episode) – Frau Schuster
- 1998: Drei Herren – Alte Frau
- 1998: Die 3 Posträuber
- 2001: Edelweiss (TV film) – Vera Dorfmeister
- 2002: Ein Hund kam in die Küche (TV film) – Mutter Blum
- 2003: Annas Heimkehr (TV film) – Josefa Schweighofer
- 2004: Bauernprinzessin (TV film) – Burgi
- 2004: Kommissar Rex: Das Donaukrokodil (TV series episode) – Frau Gruber
- 2007: Heile Welt – Karin's mother
- 2007: Silent Resident – Frau Danneberg
- 2007: Zodiak – Der Horoskop-Mörder (TV miniseries) – Gertrud Orlak
- 2007: Copacabana (TV film) – Rita
- 2008: Nordwand – Grossmutter Kurz
- 2008: Anonyma – Eine Frau in Berlin – Achtzigjährige Frau
- 2009: Kaifeck Murder – Alma Lukas
- 2010: Tod in Istanbul (TV film) – Mutter von Kurt Herder
- 2010: Kottan ermittelt: Rien ne va plus – Mutter Ziwoda
- 2010: Echte Wiener 2 – Die Deppat'n und die Gspritzt'n – Morak
- 2011: Anfang 80 – Herta
- 2014: Und Äktschn! – Frau Lupo
- 2014: Der letzte Tanz – Frau Ecker
- 2014: Therapy for a Vampire – Fräulein Sedlacek
- 2016: Hundraettåringen som smet från notan och försvann – Amanda Einstein
- 2017: La Pasada: Die Überfahrt – Flora
- 2018: Murer: Anatomie eines Prozesses – Oma Julius
- 2018: The Tobacconist – Frau im Pelzmantel im Bahnhof
- 2018: Landkrimi: Der Tote im See – Maria Ahoner
- 2019: Der Gast – Die Mutter des Hausherrn
- 2023: Wie der Soldat das Grammofon repariert – Urgrossmutter Mileva

== Publications ==
- Mangold, Ernie; Priesching, Doris (2011). Lassen Sie mich in Ruhe: Erinnerungen [Leave Me Alone: Memories] (in German). Wien: Amalthea. ISBN 978-3-85002-766-3. OCLC 813551016.
- Dobretsberger, Christine; Wahl, Eva (2015). "Erni Mangold: Einsam fühle ich mich nie". "Was ich liebe, gibt mir Kraft": Bühnenstars aus Oper und Theater erzählen ["What I Love Gives Me Strength": Stage Stars from Opera and Theater Share Their Stories.] (in German). Wien, Graz, Klagenfurt: Styria Premium. ISBN 978-3-222-13517-0. OCLC 910327739.

== Decorations and awards ==
- 1971: Kainz Medal
- 2000: Kammerschauspielerin
- 2004/2005: Karl-Skraup Prize
- 2005: Nestroy Theatre Prize in the category of Best Supporting Actor
- 2006: Golden Medal of Honour for Services to the City of Vienna
- 2009: Grand Gold Decoration for Services to the province of Lower Austria
- 2012: Austrian Cross of Honour for Science and Art
