= Arno Paulsen =

German actor

- Born: 3 January 1900; Stettin, Pomerania; German Empire
- Died: 17 September 1969 (aged 69); Baden-Baden, Baden-Württemberg; West Germany
- Occupation: Actor
- Years active: 1946-1965 (film)

Arno Paulsen (1900–1969) was a German actor who appeared in around sixty films in the post-Second World War years. He also appeared frequently on stage and was also a voice actor dubbing foreign films for release in Germany. He appeared in a mixture of West German and East German films. He made his film debut in the 1946 rubble film Murderers Among Us.

== Filmography ==
Year	Title	Role	Notes
1946	Murderers Among Us	Ferdinand Brueckner	
1947	Raid	Franz Mierisch, Spediteur	
1947	Wozzeck	Hauptmann	
1948	The Adventures of Fridolin	Der Gefängnisdirektor	
1948	Street Acquaintances	Elses Freund	
1948	Chemistry and Love	C.D. Miller	
1948	The Morgenrot Mine	Gomolla	
1948	Blum Affair	Wilhelm Platzer	
1949	The Bridge	Herr Reinhardt	
1949	Girls in Gingham		
1949	Martina	Kuchenreuther	
1949	Girls Behind Bars	Helmcke	
1950	Hoegler's Mission	Wiesner	
1950	Thirteen Under One Hat	Oskar Tielebein, Gerichtsvollzieher	
1950	Five Suspects	Vater Gustav Klimm	Uncredited
1950	Bürgermeister Anna	Bauer Lehmkuhl	
1950	The Orplid Mystery	Mr. Hill	
1950	Third from the Right	Herwitz	
1951	Heart's Desire	Manager Winternitz	
1951	Hilfe, ich bin unsichtbar		
1951	Johannes und die 13 Schönheitsköniginnen	Maharadscha	
1951	Bluebeard	Matthes	
1951	Torreani	Bichler	
1952	You Only Live Once	Braun	
1952	When the Heath Dreams at Night		
1953	The Uncle from America	Hermann Hartung	
1953	Anna Susanna	Jan Brödel	
1953	We'll Talk About Love Later		
1953	Die Unbesiegbaren	Hauptmann Bullerjahn	
1953	Red Roses, Red Lips, Red Wine		
1953	Christina	Bankier Frank	
1953	I and You	Vater Erdmann	
1954	Regina Amstetten	Herr Schirrwind	
1954	Roman eines Frauenarztes	Direktor Bertens	
1954	The Great Test	Stadtrat Ermer	
1954	Canaris	Taxifahrer - Berlin	
1955	Ein Mann vergißt die Liebe		
1955	The Plot to Assassinate Hitler	Luftschutzwart Nessel	
1955	Hotel Adlon	Portier Wititscheck	
1955	Alibi	Taxifahrer	
1956	Ein Herz schlägt für Erika		
1956	My Father, the Actor	Herr Behmer	
1956	Liane, Jungle Goddess	Kriminalkommissar	
1956	Uns gefällt die Welt	Redakteur	
1957	Der Stern von Afrika	Vater Marseille	
1957	Banktresor 713	Margots Vater	
1958	Scampolo	Senator	
1958	Hoppla, jetzt kommt Eddie	Leiter Reisebüro	
1958	Rosemary	Schmidt	
1958	Munchhausen in Africa	Tropenarzt	Uncredited
1959	Dream Revue	Hugo Liebling, Direktor	
1959	The Day the Rains Came	Textilkaufmann Grossmann	
1961	Robert and Bertram	Direktor Malina	
1961	Liane, die Tochter des Dschungels		
1965	Hands Up or I'll Shoot		

== Bibliography ==
- Brockmann, Stephen. A Critical History of German Film. Camden House, 2010.
