= Hardy Krüger =

German actor and author (1928–2022)

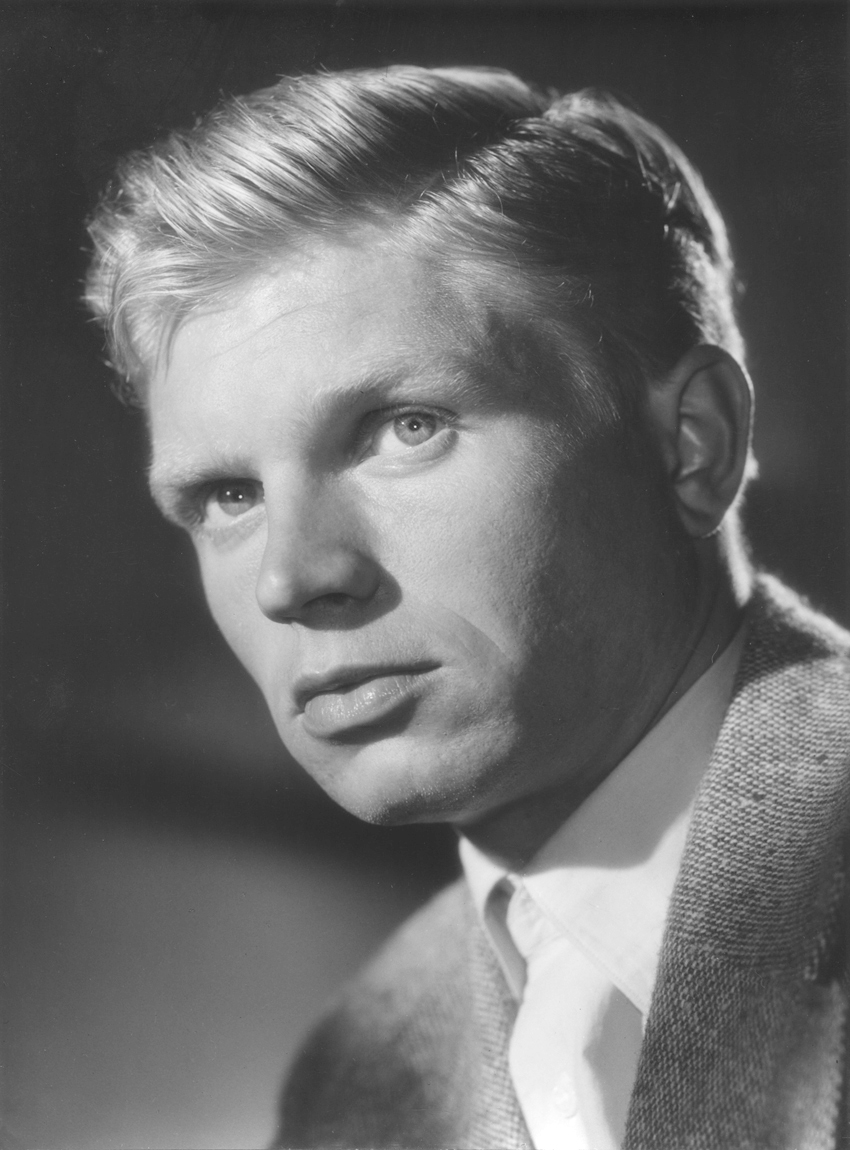
- Krüger in 1955
- Born: Eberhard August Franz Ewald Krüger; 12 April 1928; Berlin, Brandenburg, Prussia, Germany
- Died: 19 January 2022 (aged 93); Palm Springs, California, U.S.
- Years active: 1944–2011
- Spouses: Renate Densow (m. 1950; div. 1964); Francesca Marazzi (m. 1965; div. 1977); Anita Park (m. 1978)
- Children: 3, including Hardy Krüger Jr.

Hardy Krüger (German: [haːɐ̯.di ˈkʁyː.ɡɐ]; born Eberhard August Franz Ewald Krüger; 12 April 1928 – 19 January 2022) was a German actor and author who appeared in more than 60 films from 1944 onwards. After becoming a film star in Germany in the 1950s, Krüger increasingly turned to roles in international films such as The One That Got Away (1957), Hatari!, Sundays and Cybèle (both 1962), The Flight of the Phoenix (1965), Battle of Neretva, The Secret of Santa Vittoria, The Red Tent (all 1969), Barry Lyndon (1975), A Bridge Too Far (1977), and The Wild Geese (1978).

== Early life ==
Hardy Krüger was born in Wedding, Berlin, in 1928, the son of Max and Auguste (Meier) Krüger. Krüger's parents were ardent Nazis and he stated in a 2016 interview that he was "raised to love Hitler." From 1941, he attended an elite Adolf Hitler School at the Ordensburg Sonthofen. At the age of 15, Hardy made his film debut in Alfred Weidenmann's The Young Eagles. According to Krüger, it was here that he met the eminent actor Hans Söhnker. Söhnker was a covert anti-Nazi, who gave refuge to those fleeing the regime. Krüger claimed that Söhnke made a point of educating him and that he assisted his friend with delivering messages to fugitives.

In March 1945, Krüger was assigned to the 38th SS Grenadier Division Nibelungen and was drawn into heavy combat. Krüger stated that he, at that time 17 years old, was ordered to shoot at an American squad. Krüger refused and was sentenced to death for cowardice, but another SS officer apparently countermanded the order. Krüger described this experience as his break with Nazism. He afterwards served as a messenger for the SS, but stated that he later escaped and hid out in Tyrol until the end of the war. Hardy was captured and taken prisoner by U.S. forces but attempted to escape three times, the third time successfully. He was a member of the Amadeu Antonio Foundation and frequently spoke publicly against extremism and for democracy, citing his own experiences.

== Life and work ==
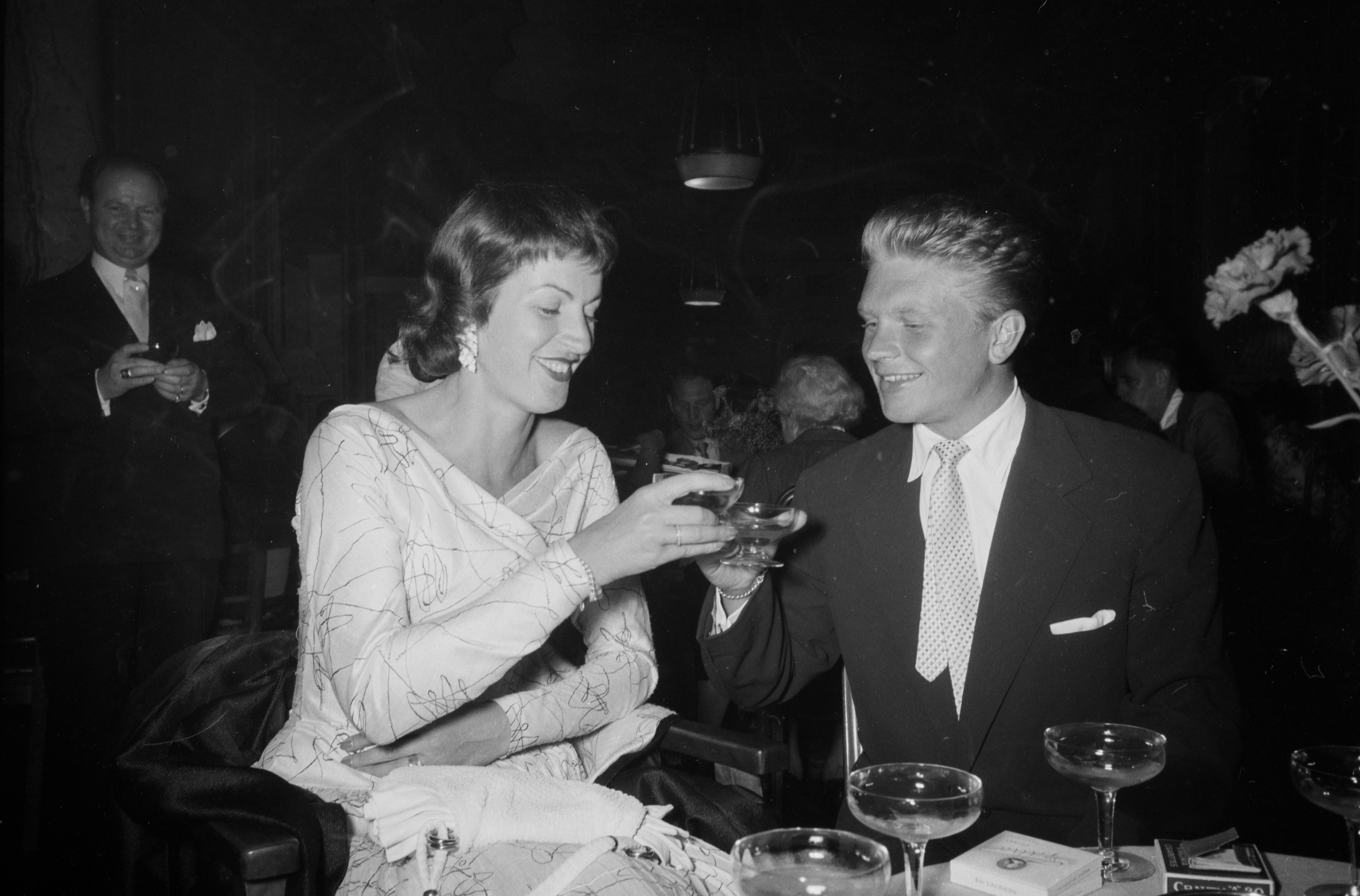
Hardy Krüger at the Locarno film festival in 1955

Krüger continued his acting career after the Second World War with small stage roles. He could not afford to attend an acting school. He established himself as a German film star during the 1950s, appearing in Die Jungfrau auf dem Dach (1953), the German version of The Moon is Blue, directed by Otto Preminger. Krüger sought international roles because he found the German Heimatfilm cinema of the 1950s rather shallow. He first came to the attention of English language audiences in the 1957 British war film The One That Got Away, the story of Franz von Werra, the only German prisoner of war to escape from Allied custody and return to Germany. This prompted a boom in the use of German stars in British films although none matched the success of Kruger.

In 1960, Krüger bought Ngorongoro, a farm in the Tanganyika Territory (now part of Tanzania), which he owned for 13 years. Ngorongoro and the area around it served as the setting for the film Hatari! (1962), directed by Howard Hawks, in which Krüger appeared with John Wayne. He fell in love with the area so much during filming that he decided he wanted to live there.

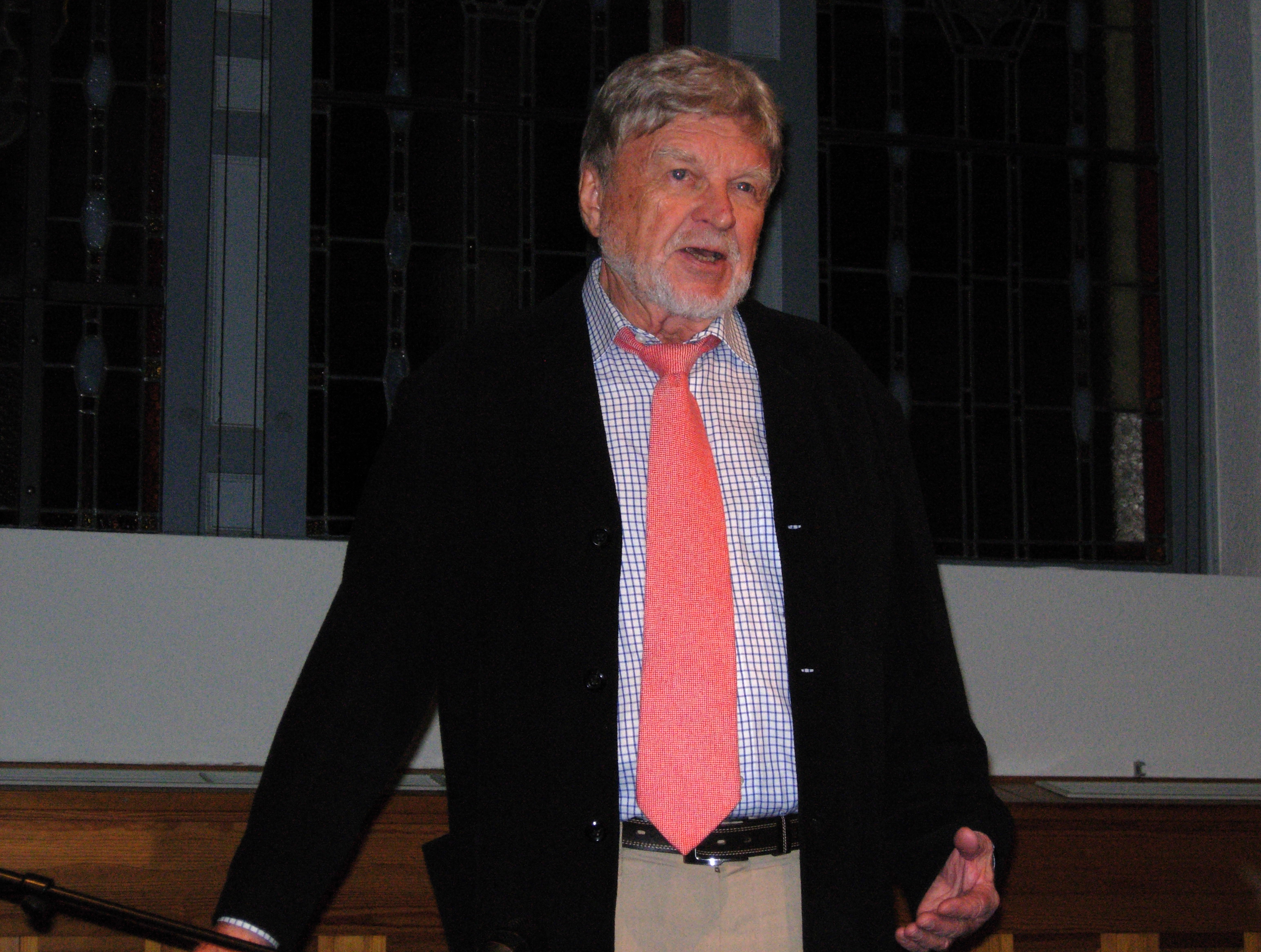
Hardy Krüger in 2009

Fluent in German, English and French, Kruger appeared in numerous European and American films. He had the leading role in the Oscar-winning Sundays and Cybele (1962), and a key role as the German model aircraft designer in the original version of The Flight of the Phoenix (1965). Other films he acted in include the comedy-drama The Secret of Santa Vittoria (1969), in which he played a German officer during the Second World War trying to find hidden wine in a small Italian town; Stanley Kubrick's Barry Lyndon with Ryan O'Neal (1975); Richard Attenborough's A Bridge Too Far, sharing a scene with Laurence Olivier, 1977; and The Wild Geese with Richard Burton (1978). Because of his stereotypical "Teutonic" look (blond hair and blue eyes), Krüger often played German soldiers; however he thought that "war films were boring and should not be made". Indeed, his own experiences with the war provided enough trauma for him to be against the glorification of it.

In the late 1980s, Krüger largely retired from acting and became a writer, including novels, travel books and memoirs. He published 16 books starting in 1970. Four of them have been translated into English. He also directed a number of European television documentaries showing his travels around the world.

== Personal life and death ==
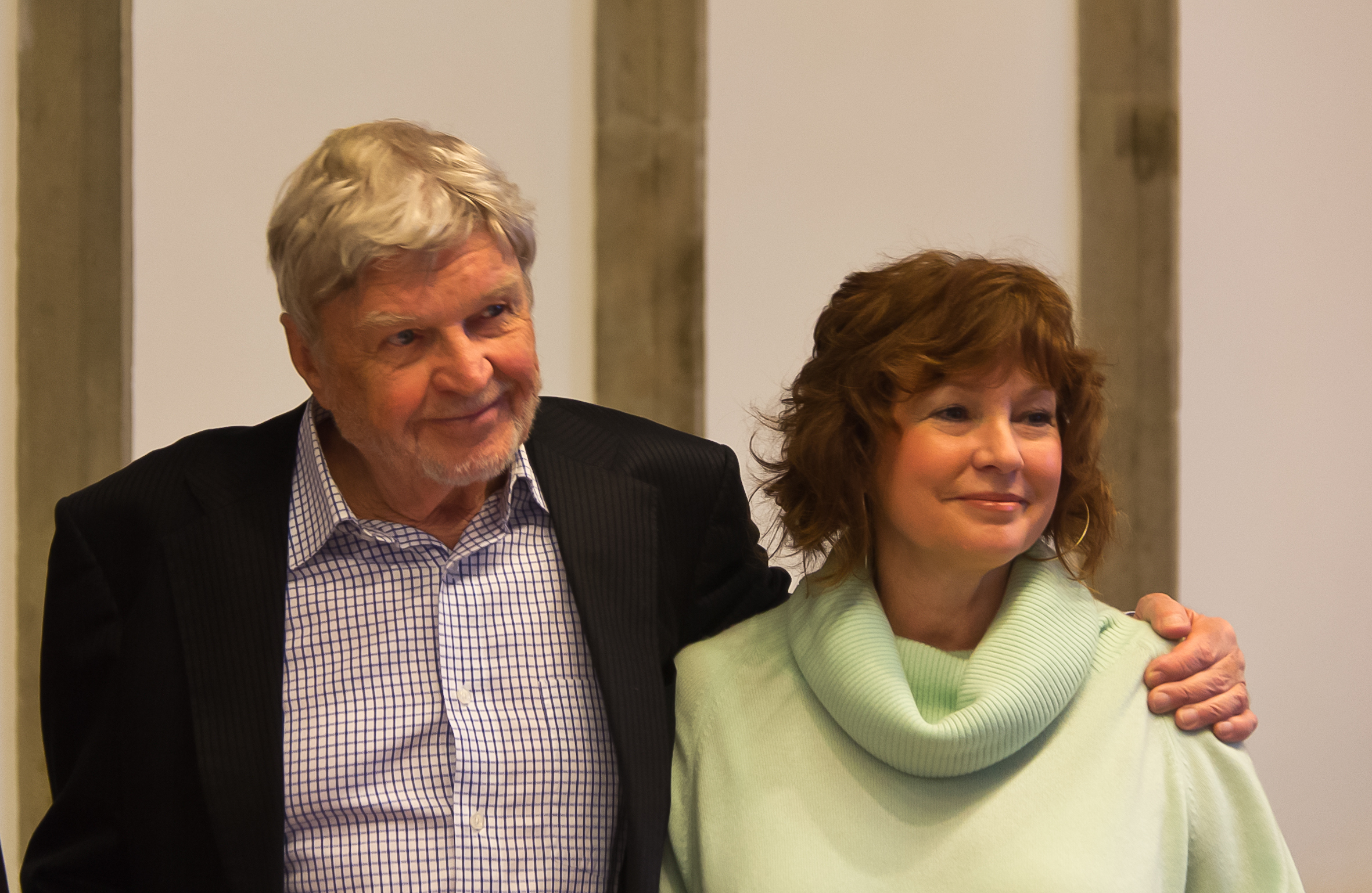
Krüger and his wife Anita in 2013

Krüger met his first wife, Renate Densow (1918–2006), in a hotel lobby when he was 16 years old. He had been billeted there with the army, while she was celebrating an acting success. They spent the night together and talked about the future together, though the war pulled them apart. He tracked her down again after the war had ended, and found that he had fathered a child Christiane Krüger. They married afterwards, although the marriage broke down in 1964.

His second marriage, to the Italian painter Francesca Marazzi, lasted from 1964 to 1977. He and Marazzi had two children, including Hardy Krüger Jr.. In the 1960s and 1970s, Krüger lived at the ranch "Hatari Lodge" (where the film Hatari! was filmed) at the foot of Mount Meru, Tanzania.

Krüger married his third wife, Anita Park, in 1978. They lived in California and Hamburg. Around this time that he also retired from acting and was able to spend more time at home.

Krüger died at his home in Palm Springs, California, US on 19 January 2022, at the age of 93.

== Selected filmography ==
- Junge Adler (Young Eagles) (1944) as Heinz Baum, called "Bäumchen" (little tree)
- I'll Never Forget That Night (1949) as Eugen Schröter
- Kätchen für alles (1949) as acting student
- Das Fräulein und der Vagabund (1949) as Karl
- The Girl from the South Seas (1950) as Richard Kirbach
- Insel ohne Moral (1950) as Manfred
- You Have to Be Beautiful (1951) as Juppi Holunder Jr.
- My Friend the Thief (1951) as Bimbo
- My Name is Niki (1952) as Paul
- I Can't Marry Them All (1952) as Edi
- Illusion in a Minor Key (1952) as Paul Alsbacher
- The Moon Is Blue (1953) as Tourist (uncredited)
- Die Jungfrau auf dem Dach (1953) as Donald Gresham
- As Long as You're Near Me (1953) as Stefan Berger
- Must We Get Divorced? (1953) as Andreas von Doerr
- I and You (1953) as Peter Erdmann
- The Last Summer (1954) as Rikola Valbo
- The Blue Danube (1955) as König Richard
- Heaven Is Never Booked Up (1955) as Michael
- Alibi (1955) as Harald Meinhardt
- Liane, Jungle Goddess (1956) as Thoren
- Die Christel von der Post (1956) as Horst Arndt, assistant police detective
- Banktresor 713 (1957) as Klaus Burkhardt
- The Fox of Paris (1957) as Capt. Fürstenwerth
- The One That Got Away (1957) as Franz Von Werra
- Confess, Doctor Corda (1958) as Dr. Fred Corda
- Bachelor of Hearts (1958) as Wolf Hauser
- The Rest Is Silence (1959) as John H. Claudius
- Blind Date (1959) as Jan-Van Rooyer
- The Goose of Sedan (1959) as Fritz Brösicke
- Boomerang (1960) as Robert Wegner
- Taxi for Tobruk (1961) as le capitaine Ludwig von Stegel
- Two Among Millions (1961) as Karl
- The Dream of Lieschen Mueller (1961, cameo) as Autograph hunter
- Hatari! (1962) as Kurt Muller
- Sundays and Cybele (Les dimanches de ville d'Avray) (1962) as Pierre
- Three Fables of Love (1962) as El rubio (segment "La mort et le bûcheron")
- Le Gros Coup (1964) as Frank Willes
- The Uninhibited (1965) as Vincent
- Le Chant du monde (1965) as Antonio
- The Flight of the Phoenix (1965) as Heinrich Dorfmann
- The Defector (1966) as Counselor Peter Heinzmann
- La Grande Sauterelle (1967) as Carl
- Franciscain of Bourges (1968) as Alfred Stanke
- The Lady of Monza (1969) as Father Paolo Arrigone
- The Battle of Neretva (1969) as Kranzer
- The Secret of Santa Vittoria (1969) as Captain von Prum
- The Red Tent (1969) as Aviator Lundborg
- Das Messer (1971, TV miniseries) as Jim Ellis
- What the Peeper Saw (1972) as Paul
- Le Solitaire (1973) as Eric Lambrecht
- Paper Tiger (1975) as Müller
- Barry Lyndon (1975) as Captain Potzdorf
- Potato Fritz (1976) as Potato Fritz
- The Spy Who Never Was (Tod eines Fremden) (1976) as Arthur Hersfeld
- À chacun son enfer (1977) as Commissare Bolar
- A Bridge Too Far (1977) as Generalmajor der Waffen-SS Karl Ludwig
- The Wild Geese (1978) as Lt. Pieter Coetzee
- Blue Fin (1978) as Bill Pascoe
- High Society Limited (1982) as Harms
- Wrong Is Right (1982) as Helmut Unger
- The Inside Man (1984) as Mandell
- War and Remembrance (1988–1989, TV miniseries) as Field Marshal Erwin Rommel
- The Family (2011, TV Movie) as Victor Frey (final film role)

== Writings ==
- Krüger, Hardy (2003). Eine Farm in Afrika (in German). Bergisch Gladbach: Bastei Lübbe. ISBN 978-3-404-15071-7. OCLC 723000967.
- Krüger, Hardy (2000). Wanderjahre Begegnungen eines jungen Schauspielers (in German). Bergisch Gladbach: Bastei Lübbe. ISBN 978-3-404-14434-1. OCLC 76200998.

== Awards ==
- 1959 Bravo Otto (bronze)
- 1960 Bravo Otto (silver)
- 1983 Deutscher Filmpreis
- 1986 Goldene Kamera
- 2001 Bavarian Film Awards Honorary Award
- 2001 Officier de la Légion d’Honneur
- 2008 Bambi: Lifetime Achievement Award
- 2009 Commander's Cross of the Order of Merit of the Federal Republic of Germany
- 2011 Jupiter Award, Lifetime Achievement
- 2014 Star on the Boulevard der Stars in Berlin

== See also ==
- List of people from Berlin
