= The Marriage of Doctor Danwitz =

1956 film directed by Arthur Maria Rabenalt

- German: Die Ehe des Dr. med. Danwitz
- Directed by: Arthur Maria Rabenalt
- Written by: Michael Mansfeld
- Produced by: Walter Koppel; Gyula Trebitsch
- Starring: Marianne Koch; Karlheinz Böhm; Heidemarie Hatheyer; Maximilian Schell
- Cinematography: Albert Benitz
- Edited by: Alice Ludwig
- Music by: Bert Grund
- Production companies: Gyula-Trebitsch-Film; Real Film
- Distributed by: Europa-Filmverleih
- Release date: 29 March 1956
- Running time: 96 minutes
- Country: West Germany
- Language: German

The Marriage of Doctor Danwitz (German: Die Ehe des Dr. med. Danwitz) is a 1956 West German drama film directed by Arthur Maria Rabenalt and starring Marianne Koch, Karlheinz Böhm and Heidemarie Hatheyer.

It was made at the Wandsbek Studios of the Hamburg-based Real Film. The film's art direction was by Dieter Bartels and Herbert Kirchhoff.

== Cast ==
- Marianne Koch as Edith Danwitz - Mannequin
- Karlheinz Böhm as Dr. med. Danwitz
- Heidemarie Hatheyer as Christa Hambach
- Paul Dahlke as Fritz Hambach - Fabrikant
- Maximilian Schell as Dr. Oswald Hauser
- Renate Mannhardt as Hilde
- Mathias Wieman as Professor Schüddekopf
- Erni Mangold as Jutta, Mannequin
- Kai Fischer as Hanna, Mannequin
- Willy Maertens as Ein Verunglückter
- Carlos Werner as Dr. Mierendorff
- Josef Dahmen as governing council
- Carl Voscherau
- Erwin Linder as Füglistaler
- Heinz Klingenberg as Dr. Frank
- Gert Niemitz
- Joachim Wolff
- Katharina Treller
- Jo Wegener
- Sonja Wilken
