= Rudolf Schindler (medical doctor) =

- Born: May 10, 1888; Berlin, Germany
- Died: September 6, 1968 (aged 80); Munich, Germany
- Occupation: Gastroenterologist
- Known for: Gastroscopy
- Notable work: Lehrbuch und Atlas der Gastroskopie
- Spouses: Gabriele Winkler; Marie Aumüller Koch

Rudolf Schindler (1888–1968) was a German physician, who practiced medicine as a gastroenterologist. He is regarded widely as the "father of gastroscopy."

He was born in Berlin. During the First World War he described numerous diseases involving the human digestive system. He wrote the illustrated textbook, Lehrbuch und Atlas der Gastroskopie (Textbook and Atlas of Gastroscopy).

Between 1928 and 1932 Schindler worked with the Berlin-based instrument-maker and technician, Georg Wolf, on the development of the first semi-flexible gastroscope, which allowed a greater range for examination, facilitating diagnosis and some treatments without abdominal surgery.

With the rise of the Nazi party he was arrested. Upon his release in 1934, he made his way to the United States of America. He settled in Chicago, Illinois, and practiced medicine there until 1943. He then relocated to Los Angeles, California, where he continued his work in gastroenterology until his retirement. His work included writing two more books in the field of gastroenterology, teaching students, and saving lives.

Schindler was married to Gabriele Winkler, who was an important contributor to his work and they had two children. After her death in 1964, he married Marie Aumiller Koch (*1901), a pianist by whom he was the natural father of two children, including actress and later doctor Marianne Koch, before he fled Germany in 1934. They moved to Munich, Germany where he died in 1968.
