= Marion Michael =

German actress

Marion Michael (17 October 1940 – 13 October 2007) was a German film actress and singer. She was best known for her role in the 1956 film Liane, Jungle Goddess. She was also the second German actress to appear nude on film, after Hildegard Knef who starred in the German film The Sinner in the 1950s.

Michael was born Marion Ilonka Michaela Delonge in Königsberg (now Kaliningrad). She was selected for the role of Liane in Liane, Jungle Goddess out of 12,000 prospective actresses. She was only 15 at the time of the filming, which took place on location in Africa, and she controversially appeared topless during the first half of the movie. The movie was a box office success. However, none of her following 10 films over the next six years were as successful.

Michael suffered injuries in a car accident during this time period. She returned to acting, but stopped again in 1965. She suffered a bout of depression and, unusually, moved from West Germany to Communist East Germany.

Michael occasionally returned to film and television acting later in her life, but only rarely. However, despite her lack of screen time after the 1960s, she remained a well known German film icon. Her last onscreen appearance was in a 1996 German television musical about her life, entitled Liane.

Michael died of heart failure in Gartz, Brandenburg, four days shy of her 67th birthday.

== Selected filmography ==
- Liane, Jungle Goddess (1956)
- Nature Girl and the Slaver (1957)
- The Mad Bomberg (1957)
- Bombs on Monte Carlo (1960)
- Final Accord (1960)
- Davon träumen alle Mädchen (1961)
- Jack and Jenny (1963)
