= Kristmann Guðmundsson =

Kristmann Guðmundsson (October 23, 1901, Thverfell, Borgarfjörður – November 20, 1983, Reykjavík) was an Icelandic novelist notable for his works of romantic fiction.

Kristmann was born out of wedlock to a country girl who left him in the care of her impoverished family. He ran away from home at the age of thirteen. From 1924 to 1937 he lived in Norway, and returned to Reykjavík in 1938.

Kristmann worked first as a journalist, then as a writer. He wrote more than thirty books, several of them in Norwegian, of romantic fiction.

== Works ==
- The Bridal Gown (1927)
- Morning of Life (1929)
- Winged Citadel (1937)
- Playthings (1961)
- The Square (1969)
