= Herbert Reinecker =

German novelist

- Born: 24 December 1914; Hagen, Westphalia, Prussia, German Empire
- Died: 27 January 2007 (aged 92); Kempfenhausen near Starnberg, Bavaria, Germany
- Occupations: Novelist, television writer

Herbert Reinecker (24 December 1914 – 27 January 2007) was a German novelist, dramatist and screenwriter.

== Career ==
Born in Hagen, Westphalia, Reinecker began to write short stories already as a high school student. In 1936, he moved to Berlin, where he became editor-in-chief of a youth magazine, Jungvolk. In the same year, he also co-authored a book, Jugend in Waffen (Armed Youth). This was a time when the Nazis had already been in power for three years and when the media had long been nazified. In 1943, he joined the Nazi Party and worked as the editor-in-chief of a book entitled Der Pimpf about the training system of the Hitler Youth. Reinecker served in a propaganda company of the Waffen-SS during World War II.

In the early 1940s, Reinecker also wrote a number of plays, among them Das Dorf bei Odessa, and the novel Der Mann mit der Geige. In 1944, he wrote an award-winning screenplay, Junge Adler (Young Eagles).

After the war, he started working for radio and television. At the same time, he wrote screenplays for the series of German feature films of the 1960s that were loosely based on Edgar Wallace's novels as well as TV adaptations of Francis Durbridge novels and plays.

In the late 1960s, Reinecker and producer Helmut Ringelmann wanted to create a truly German police detective. At first tentatively conceived as a "German Maigret", Reinecker's Kommissar Keller soon metamorphosed into a full-fledged character. Erik Ode was chosen to play Keller in the TV series, Der Kommissar, which was finally launched in 1969 and which became a huge success. In 1974, Reinecker and Ringelmann started a new, similar series, Derrick which was in production until 1998 with major international success.

== Personal life ==
In 1938 Herbert Reinecker married Angela Schmikowski, with whom he had two children – daughter Rita (also a writer/author), 1941, and Hilmar (1944–2001). Divorced in 1954, he married Brunhilde (Holly) Schubert in 1959.

Reinecker is reported to have stopped writing due to macular degeneration. He was nearly blind when he died on 27 January 2007, aged 92.

== Selected filmography ==
- The Rainer Case (1942, based on his novel Der Mann mit der Geige)
- Father Needs a Wife (1952)
- I and You (1953)
- Canaris (1954)
- Heaven Is Never Booked Up (1955)
- Children, Mother, and the General (1955)
- Alibi (1955)
- Der Stern von Afrika (1957)
- El Hakim (1957)
- The Fox of Paris (1957)
- Taiga (1958)
- The Trapp Family in America (1958)
- As Long as the Heart Still Beats (1958)
- People in the Net (1959)
- Dorothea Angermann (1959)
- Boomerang (1960)
- And So to Bed (1963)
- An Alibi for Death (1963)
- The River Line (1964)
- Nachtzug D 106 (1964, TV film)
- Der Hexer (1964)
- DM-Killer (1965)
- Man Called Gringo (1965)
- I Am Looking for a Man (1966)
- Maigret and His Greatest Case (1966)
- The Hunchback of Soho (1966)
- Murderers Club of Brooklyn (1967)
- The College Girl Murders (1967)
- Der Tod läuft hinterher (1967, TV miniseries)
- The Valley of Death (1968)
- The Hound of Blackwood Castle (1968)
- Babeck (1968, TV miniseries)
- Der Kommissar (1969–1976, TV series, 96 episodes)
- 11 Uhr 20 (1970, TV miniseries)
- Under the Roofs of St. Pauli (1970)
- Angels with Burnt Wings (1970)
- The Girl from Hong Kong (1973)
- Crime After School (1975)
- Derrick (1974–1998, TV series; 281 episodes)
