= Canaris (film) =

1954 film

- Directed by: Alfred Weidenmann
- Written by: Erich Ebermayer; Herbert Reinecker
- Produced by: Emile J. Lustig
- Starring: O. E. Hasse; Barbara Rütting; Adrian Hoven; Martin Held
- Cinematography: Franz Weihmayr
- Edited by: Ilse Voigt
- Music by: Siegfried Franz
- Production company: Fama-Film
- Distributed by: Europa-Filmverleih
- Release dates: 30 December 1954 (West Germany); 28 April 1958 (New York City)
- Running time: 112 minutes
- Country: West Germany
- Language: German
- Budget: $320,000

Canaris is a 1954 West German drama film directed by Alfred Weidenmann and starring O. E. Hasse, Barbara Rütting and Adrian Hoven. It portrays real events during the Second World War when Wilhelm Canaris, the head of German military intelligence, was arrested and executed for his involvement with the 20 July Plot to overthrow Adolf Hitler. The film was a major success at the German box office, possibly because it allowed audiences to identify with a heroic German figure disassociated from Nazism. Released in the UK as Canaris Master Spy, and in the US as Deadly Decision—it is also known by the alternative title Canaris: Master Spy.

It was shot at the Tempelhof Studios in Berlin.

== Main cast ==
- O. E. Hasse as Admiral Canaris
- Barbara Rütting as Irene von Harbeck
- Adrian Hoven as Captain Althoff
- Martin Held as Obergruppenfuehrer Heydrich
- Wolfgang Preiss as Colonel Holl
- Peter Mosbacher as Fernandez
- Charles Regnier as Baron Trenti
- Franz Essel as Beckmann
- Alice Treff as Fräulein Winter
- Herbert Wilk as Hauptmann Degenhard
- Klaus Miedel as André, Franz. Offizier
- Arthur Schröder as Herr von Harbeck
- Ilse Fürstenberg as Anna Lüdtke
- Arno Paulsen as Taxifahrer
- Nora Hagist as Luftwaffenhelferin

== Music ==
The soundtrack features music from Lohengrin, composed by Richard Wagner.

== Release ==
Canaris opened in Hanover on 30 December 1954. The distributor played down any political significance to the film, and marketed it as the story of a good German Christian "whose human tragedy reflects the experience of millions of Germans."

== Reception ==
The film was generally well received by critics, the press, and the public. Rated "worthwhile" by FBW, it was awarded a Bambi for being the most financially successful film of 1955.

The film's portrayal of a "tragic hero" of the Nazi period has been described as part of the beginning of a wave of films "interrogating the National Socialist past" in West German cinemas.
