= Alibi (1955 film) =

1955 film

- Directed by: Alfred Weidenmann
- Written by: Herbert Reinecker; Alfred Weidenmann; Herbert Reinecker
- Produced by: Friedrich A. Mainz; Helmut Ungerland
- Starring: O.E. Hasse; Martin Held; Hardy Krüger
- Cinematography: Helmut Ashley
- Edited by: Carl Otto Bartning
- Music by: Hans-Martin Majewski
- Production company: Fama-Film
- Distributed by: Europa-Filmverleih
- Release date: 30 December 1955
- Running time: 103 minutes
- Country: West Germany
- Language: German

Alibi is a 1955 West German crime drama film directed by Alfred Weidenmann and starring O.E. Hasse, Martin Held and Hardy Krüger. It was shot at the Tempelhof Studios in West Berlin and on location in Hamburg. The film's sets were designed by the art director Rolf Zehetbauer.

== Synopsis ==
A hotshot newspaper reporter is summoned for jury service. Young Harald Meinhardt is charged with killing Frau Overbeck, the wife of a very successful scientist, with whom he was having an affair. The journalist Peter Hansen is the only member of the jury to vote against Meinhardt's conviction. He launches a newspaper campaign to demonstrate his innocence, and sets out to identify the real killer.

== Cast ==
- O.E. Hasse as Peter Hansen
- Martin Held as Dr. Kurt Overbeck
- Hardy Krüger as Harald Meinhardt
- Eva Ingeborg Scholz as Inge Römer
- Gisela von Collande as Frau Hansen
- Charles Regnier as Dietmar, Chef vom Dienst
- Peer Schmidt as Benjamin Roland
- Ernst Waldow a sKriminalkommissar Lukkas
- Siegfried Schürenberg as Vorsitzender des Gerichts
- Helga Roloff as Fräulein Dr. Klausen
- Jan Hendriks as Berthold
- Almut Rothweiler as Frau Overbeck
- Franz Essel as Staatsanwalt
- Hermann Holve as Verteidiger
- Hans-Albert Martens as Strafverteidiger
- Helmuth Rudolph as Chefredakteur von Pleskau
- Walter Werner as Vater Meinhardt
- Maria Sebaldt as Fräulein Krüger, Moderedakteurin
- Maly Delschaft as Frau Wilke
- Alexa von Porembsky as Hausangestellte Maria
- Arno Paulsen as Taxifahrer
- Walter Tarrach as Dr. Fischer
- Alexander Hunzinger as Ausrufer
- Fany Spornitz as Frau Dr. Brandt
- Alfred Maack as Kaufmann Beermann
- Ludwig Linkmann as Lokalredakteur Becker

== Bibliography ==
- Julia Bernhard & Sylvia Rebbelmund. O.E. Hasse. Stiftung Archiv der Akademie der Künste, 2003.
