= Alfred Weidenmann =

German film director

- Born: 10 May 1916; Stuttgart, German Empire
- Died: 9 June 2000 (aged 84); Zürich, Switzerland
- Occupations: Film director, screenwriter
- Years active: 1942–1984

Alfred Weidenmann (10 May 1916 – 9 June 2000) was a German film director, screenwriter, and author of children's books. He directed more than 30 films between 1942 and 1984.

== Selected filmography ==
- Hände hoch! (1942) (1942)
- Junge Adler (1944)
- I and You (1953)
- Canaris (1954)
- Der Himmel ist nie ausverkauft (1955)
- Alibi (1955)
- Heaven Is Never Booked Up (1955)
- Kitty and the Great Big World (1956)
- Der Stern von Afrika (1957)
- Scampolo (1958)
- As Long as the Heart Still Beats (1958)
- The Buddenbrooks (1959)
- Boomerang (1960)
- Sacred Waters (1960)
- Adorable Julia (1962)
- Only a Woman (1962)
- And So to Bed (1963)
- Condemned to Sin (1964)
- Shots in Threequarter Time (1965)
- The Gentlemen (1965)
- Who Wants to Sleep? (1965)
- I Am Looking for a Man (1966)
- Maigret and His Greatest Case (1966)
- Pistolen-Jenny (1969, TV film)
- Under the Roofs of St. Pauli (1970)
- The Bordello (1971)
- Sonderdezernat K1 (1972–1981, TV series, 7 episodes)
- ...aber Jonny! (1973)
- Derrick (1975–1998, TV series, 30 episodes)
- The Old Fox (1977–1999, TV series, 14 episodes)
- The Rider on the White Horse (1978)
- Der keusche Lebemann (1978, TV film)
- Mensch ohne Fahrschein (1984, TV film)
