= Films based on works by Edgar Wallace =

List of films based on Edgar Wallace works

Edgar Wallace (1875–1932) was a British novelist, playwright and screenwriter whose works have been adapted for the screen on many occasions. His films fall into two categories, British adaptations and the German "Krimi" films.

== British adaptations ==
His works were adapted for the silent screen as early as 1916, and continued to be adapted by British filmmakers into the 1940s. Anglo-Amalgamated later released a separate series of 47 features entitled the Edgar Wallace Mysteries, which ran from 1960 to 1965.

=== British silent films ===
- The Man Who Bought London (1916)
- The Green Terror (1919) based on the novel The Green Rust
- Pallard the Punter (1919) based on the novel Grey Timothy
- Angel Esquire (1919)
- The River of Stars (1921)
- The Four Just Men (1921)
- Melody of Death (1922)
- The Crimson Circle (1922)
- Down Under Donovan (1922)
- The Diamond Man (1924)
- The Flying Fifty-Five (1924)
- The Green Archer (1925)
- Mark of the Frog (1928) serial
- The Terrible People (1928) serial, made in the U.S.
- Valley of Ghosts (1928)
- The Forger (1928)
- The Ringer (1928)
- The Man Who Changed his Name (1928)
- The Flying Squad (1929)
- Prince Gabby (1929)
- The Clue of the New Pin (1929)

=== British sound films ===
- The Terror (1928)
- The Crimson Circle (1929) a German film dubbed in English for British release
- The Squeaker (1930)
- The Yellow Mask (1930)
- The Calendar (1931)
- The Old Man (1931)
- Hound of the Baskervilles (1932) based on the Arthur Conan Doyle novel, but the screenplay was written by Edgar Wallace
- The Frightened Lady (1932) a.k.a. The Indian Scarf
- The Jewel (1933)
- Before Dawn (1933) Hollywood film based on the Edgar Wallace story Death Watch
- Giallo (1933 film) - technically an Italian film, based on the Wallace novel The Man Who Changed His Mind
- Mystery Liner (1934)
- The Man Who Changed His Name (1934)
- Sanders of the River (1935)
- The Crimson Circle (1936)
- Strangers on Honeymoon (1936) adapted from the novel The Northing Tramp
- The Squeaker (1937) a.k.a. Murder on Diamond Row
- The Frog (1937)
- Return of the Frog (1938)
- The Gaunt Stranger (1938) a.k.a. The Ringer
- The Terror (1938)
- Dangerous to Know (1938) made in U.S.
- Mr. Reeder in Room 13 (1938) a.k.a. The Mystery of Room 13
- The Mind of Mr. Reeder (1939) a.k.a. The Mysterious Mr. Reeder in U.S.
- The Flying Fifty-Five (1939)
- The Four Just Men (1939) a.k.a. The Secret Four
- The Dark Eyes of London (1939) a.k.a.The Human Monster; starred Bela Lugosi
- The Case of the Frightened Lady (1940) a.k.a. The Indian Scarf
- The Green Archer (1940) serial
- The Missing People (1940)
- The Door with Seven Locks (1940) a.k.a. Chamber of Horrors
- The Missing Million (1942)
- The Calendar (1948)
- The Squeaker (1949) made for BBC-TV
- The Ringer (1952) Working title was The Gaunt Stranger

=== Edgar Wallace Mysteries (1960–1965) ===
This was a series of British B-Pictures, produced at Merton Park Studios for the Anglo-Amalgamated production company. There were 47 films in the series, all released theatrically between 1960 and 1965.

=== Harry Alan Towers films ===
Harry Alan Towers produced four Edgar Wallace films in the early 1960s that were international co-productions with Germany:

- Death Drums Along the River (1963) released in USA as Sanders
- Coast of Skeletons (1965) a.k.a. Sanders and the Ship of Death
- Circus of Fear (1966) (aka Psycho-Circus) based on the novel Again the Three Just Men
- Five Golden Dragons (1967) this film was only periphally connected to Edgar Wallace, in that one of Wallace's characters (Commissioner Sanders) was inserted into the film's storyline

=== British television series ===
- The Four Just Men was a series of 39 25-minute films/episodes produced by Sapphire Films for ITV in 1959.
- The Mind of Mr. J.G. Reeder was a British television series (1968-1971) with 16 episodes, based on Edgar Wallace's stories.

== German Krimi adaptations ==
The crime films produced by the West German company Rialto Film between 1959 and 1972 form their own subgenre known as Krimis (abbreviation for the German term Kriminalfilm or Kriminalroman). Aside from the Rialto productions, other Edgar Wallace adaptations in a similar style were made by the West Germans Artur Brauner and Kurt Ulrich as well as the British producer Harry Alan Towers.

=== Early history of the German Edgar Wallace movies ===
As early as the silent movie era, German film producers discovered that the novels of Edgar Wallace were easily adapted to the screen. The first German production of an Edgar Wallace story, Der große Unbekannte (The Unknown), was filmed in 1927. Wallace personally visited the production of the next movie Der rote Kreis (The Crimson Circle, 1929) in Berlin. The Crimson Circle was trade-shown in London in March 1929 in the Phonofilm sound-on-film system.

In 1931, Karel Lamač adapted The Squeaker, one of Wallace's best known works, as the sound film Der Zinker. Adaptations of The Ringer (Der Hexer, 1932) by Lamarc and The Double (Der Doppelgänger, 1934) by E. W. Emo followed. From 1934 to the mid-1950s, no German-language films based on works by Edgar Wallace were produced. Then, in the mid-1950s, the West German film distributor Constantin Film began plans for a series of films. Due to the perceived unpopularity of the crime genre in West Germany at that time, however, no film producer willing to take such a risk could be found, delaying the project until 1959.

=== The 1960s German "Krimi" film movement ===
In 1959, the Danish company Rialto Film, with its producer Preben Philipsen produced Der Frosch mit der Maske (based on The Fellowship of the Frog), targeting the West German film market. The film (a.k.a. The Face of the Frog) turned out to be surprisingly successful and started a veritable fad of crime movies, known as Krimis (abbreviation for the German term "Kriminalfilm" or "Kriminalroman") which lasted until significant changes in the direction of the West German film industry in the early 1970s occurred. Rialto soon acquired the exclusive rights to nearly all the Wallace novels, founded a West German subsidiary company and, unconcerned by the many copycat productions by others, moved towards the artistic and commercial peak of the series in the early 1960s.

There were a total of 39 West German movies based on works by Edgar Wallace from 1959 to 1972. Beginning with Der grüne Bogenschütze (The Green Archer, 1960/61), the leading examples of the genre were produced by Horst Wendlandt and directed by Alfred Vohrer or Harald Reinl. Following Der Bucklige von Soho (1966), all of Rialto's Krimi movies were shot in color. Additionally, the original novels were increasingly disregarded in favour of original stories. From 1969 onwards, Rialto Film started four co-productions with Italian producers to minimize costs. Audiences began to lose interest in the genre, which ended with Das Rätsel des silbernen Halbmonds in 1972.

=== The German Edgar Wallace "Krimi" filmography (1959–72) ===
These films were all produced (or co-produced) by Rialto Film of West Germany (Horst Wendlandt) unless noted otherwise. (Rialto co-produced 32 of the following 39 West German films.) Where the German title is different from the English release print, a translation of the German title is also provided.

Year	German Film Title	English Release Title(s)	Produced by	Director
1959	Der Frosch mit der Maske (The Frog With the Mask)	Face of the Frog (based on the novel Fellowship of the Frog)		Harald Reinl
1960	Der rote Kreis (The Red Circle)	The Crimson Circle		Jürgen Roland
1960	Der Rächer	The Avenger	Kurt Ulrich-Film	Karl Anton
1960	Die Bande des Schreckens (The Gang of Terror)	The Terrible People (a.k.a. Hand of the Gallows)		Harald Reinl
1961	Der grüne Bogenschütze	The Green Archer		Jürgen Roland
1961	Die toten Augen von London	Dead Eyes of London (based on the novel Dark Eyes of London)		Alfred Vohrer
1961	Das Geheimnis der gelben Narzissen (Mystery of the Yellow Daffodil)	The Devil's Daffodil (based on the novel The Daffodil Mystery)		Ákos Ráthonyi
1961	Der Fälscher von London	The Forger of London (based on the novel The Forger)		Harald Reinl
1961	Die seltsame Gräfin	The Strange Countess		Josef von Báky
1962	Das Rätsel der roten Orchidee	The Puzzle of the Red Orchid (aka Secret of the Red Orchid)		Helmut Ashley
1962	Die Tür mit den sieben Schlössern	The Door with Seven Locks		Alfred Vohrer
1962	Das Gasthaus an der Themse (The Inn on the Thames)	The Inn on the River (based on the novel The Indian Rubber Man)		Alfred Vohrer
1963	Der Fluch der gelben Schlange	The Curse of the Yellow Snake (based on the novel The Yellow Snake)	CCC-Film/ Artur Brauner	Franz Josef Gottlieb
1963	Der Zinker	The Squeaker		Alfred Vohrer
1963	Der schwarze Abt	The Black Abbot		Franz Josef Gottlieb
1963	Das indische Tuch	The Indian Scarf		Alfred Vohrer
1963	Zimmer 13	Room 13		Harald Reinl
1963	Todestrommeln am großen Fluß	Death Drums Along the River (a.k.a. Sanders)	Harry Alan Towers	Lawrence Huntington
1964	Die Gruft mit dem Rätselschloß	The Curse of the Hidden Vault (based on the novel Angel Esquire)		Franz Josef Gottlieb
1964	Der Hexer	The Ringer (a.k.a. The Mysterious Magician)		Alfred Vohrer
1964	Das Verrätertor	Traitor's Gate		Freddie Francis
1964	Sanders und das Schiff des Todes (Sanders and the Ship of Death)	Coast of Skeletons	Harry Alan Towers	Robert Lynn
1965	Neues vom Hexer	Again the Ringer		Alfred Vohrer
1965	Der unheimliche Mönch	The Sinister Monk (adapted from the play The Terror)		Harald Reinl
1966	Der Bucklige von Soho	The Hunchback of Soho		Alfred Vohrer
1966	Das Geheimnis der weißen Nonne (Mystery of the White Nun)	The Trygon Factor (based on the novel Kate Plus Ten)		Cyril Frankel
1966	Das Rätsel des silbernen Dreieck (Puzzle of the Silver Triangle)	Circus of Fear (a.k.a. Circus of Terror and Psycho-Circus); based on the novel Again the Three Just Men	Harry Alan Towers	John Llewellyn Moxey
1967	Die Blaue Hand (The Blue Hand)	Creature with the Blue Hand; re-edited in 1987 as The Bloody Dead with added gore by producer Sam Sherman		Alfred Vohrer
1967	Der Mönch mit der Peitsche	The College Girl Murders		Alfred Vohrer
1967	Five Golden Dragons		Harry Alan Towers	Jeremy Summers
1968	Der Hund von Blackwood Castle	The Hound of Blackwood Castle (a.k.a. The Monster of Blackwood Castle)		Alfred Vohrer
1968	Im Banne des Unheimlichen (In the Spell of the Unknown)	The Hand of Power; a.k.a. The Zombie Walks (based on the novel The Hand of Power)		Alfred Vohrer
1968	Der Gorilla von Soho	The Gorilla of Soho (a.k.a. The Gorilla Gang)		Alfred Vohrer
1969	Der Mann mit dem Glasauge	The Man with the Glass Eye (a.k.a. Terror on Half Moon Street) (working title was The Cruel Doll)		Alfred Vohrer
1969	Das Gesicht im Dunkeln (The Face in the Dark)	Double Face (A doppia faccia) ; a.k.a. Puzzle of Horrors		Riccardo Freda
1971	Der Teufel kam aus Akasava	The Devil Came from Akasava (based on the story Keeper of the Stone)	CCC-Film/ Artur Brauner	Jesus Franco
1971	Die Tote aus der Themse (The Body in the Thames)	Angels of Terror (U.S.)		Harald Philipp
1972	Das Geheimnis der grünen Stecknadel (The Secret of the Green Pin)	What Have You Done to Solange?/ Cosa avete fatto a Solange?); a.k.a. The School That Couldn't Scream (falsely promoted as an Edgar Wallace film)		Massimo Dallamano
1972	Das Rätsel des silbernen Halbmonds (Puzzle of the Silver Half Moons)	Seven Blood-Stained Orchids/ Sette orchidee macchiate di rosso (falsely promoted as an Edgar Wallace film)		Umberto Lenzi

==== Style in 1960s "Krimis" films ====
The typical Krimi movie of the 60s contains a number of distinct stylistic traits, which not only makes the films a true series, but – seen in context with other, similar West German crime movies of that time – marks them as part of a true film subgenre as well.

In particular, two directors Harald Reinl (five movies) and Alfred Vohrer (14 movies) made their mark. While Reinl preferred long dolly shots /pans and exterior shots, Vohrer's films are known for their slight overacting and their distinct zoom and editing styles. Many of these Edgar Wallace krimis featured secretive, flamboyant, super villains whose faces were sometimes hidden from view, an archetype which would later become a staple of spy films in the mid-to-late 1960s.

The titles, which are usually the German language titles of the novels, were intended to evoke the typical image of an Edgar Wallace movie. Most titles mention the villain, like Der Frosch mit der Maske (literally "The Frog with the Mask"), Der Zinker ("The Squeaker") and Der Hexer ("The Ringer"). More abstract titles usually include the words Rätsel ("mystery") or Geheimnis ("secret"), for example Das Rätsel der roten Orchidee ("Secret of the Red Orchid") Das Rätsel des silbernen Dreiecks ("The Mystery of the Silver Triangle") and Das Geheimnis der grünen Stecknadel ("The Secret of the Green Pin"), while others hint at the location of the story, for example Der Fälscher von London ("The Forger of London"), Der Bucklige von Soho ("The Hunchback of Soho") and Die Tote aus der Themse ("The Dead Girl in the Thames").

The repeated casting of the same actors, generally for similar roles, is typical for the 1960s Wallace movies as well. Among the most popular lead protagonists are Joachim Fuchsberger, Heinz Drache and Siegfried Lowitz. Shady characters were mostly played by Fritz Rasp, Pinkas Braun, Harry Wüstenhagen and especially Klaus Kinski, while comic relief was offered by Eddi Arent, Siegfried Schürenberg and later Hubert von Meyerinck or Chris Howland. Additionally, well-known film and stage actors like Elisabeth Flickenschildt, Gert Fröbe, Dieter Borsche, Lil Dagover, Karin Dor and Rudolf Forster repeatedly appeared in important guest roles.

The location of the story is, like in the novels, mostly London and its proximity, with the characters mostly moving through old castles, mansions or country houses – even if the sets were actually in West Germany. Seedy night clubs, asylums, dark basements as well as, especially in later movies, girl's colleges and of course Scotland Yard, are popular main and side locations for Edgar Wallace movies.

The stories are very similar across the series as well. The plot is most often centered on one inventively masked main villain. The motivations for the crimes are mostly greed, revenge, legacy hunting, and, especially in later movies, things like white slavery and the drug trade. Not unlike the later Italian subgenre of Giallo, the Wallace Krimi movies heavily revolve around the work of the police or a private investigator. Another typical feature is the hapless heroine, and it is not uncommon for the two protagonists to be happily in love at the conclusion of the story. The title sequences of the films were all in color from 1961 onwards, even if the rest of the film was in black and white. Also, in 1962 the voice-over "Hallo, hier spricht Edgar Wallace" ("Hello, this is Edgar Wallace speaking") was added to the beginning of the title sequence in the German versions only. Usually a murder is committed before the film's pre-credit sequence.

A very distinct trait is the score by Martin Böttcher and especially by Peter Thomas. Three of the four late West German-Italian coproductions are even scored by Ennio Morricone. Little is known about the composer Keith Papworth, who scored Das Geheimnis der gelben Narzissen, except that he died in March 1992.

Hallo, hier spricht Edgar Wallace
The opening voiceover of the Rialto Edgar Wallace films from 1962 onwards – 23 KB

==== Other Edgar Wallace-type German films ====
In the wake of the Edgar Wallace movies, the Krimi genre became a staple of the West German filmmaking scene. In addition to those based on the works of Edgar Wallace, are the Artur Brauner-produced Doktor Mabuse film series and the stories of Bryan Edgar Wallace (Wallace's son, who was also a crime novelist) such as The Hangman of London and The Phantom of Soho. Also, the Jerry Cotton and Kommissar X movie series, and the Father Brown and Louis Weinert-Wilton series, are stylistically closely related to the Edgar Wallace movies and all fall within the German Krimi genre.

The movies are still popular in Germany, and are frequently rerun on television. There are numerous parodies and spoofs of these films, most recently the 2004 movie Der Wixxer (approximately "The Wanker", a parody of Der Hexer) and its 2007 sequel Neues vom Wixxer (a parody of Neues vom Hexer).

== Bryan Edgar Wallace films ==
Seeking to emulate the success of Rialto Film's Edgar Wallace movies, CCC Filmkunst bought the rights to the written works of Edgar's son, Bryan Edgar Wallace. The stories were re-written as they were adapted into movies, but they were still promoted as "Bryan Edgar Wallace Movies" in the hope that his name would attract a large audience. The following were all CCC Filmkunst productions.

- The Secret of the Black Trunk (Das Geheimnis der schwarzen Koffer) (1961) based on Bryan Wallace's novel Death Packs a Suitcase
- The Strangler of Blackmoor Castle (Der Würger von Schloss Blackmoor) (1963)
- The Hangman of London (Der Henker von London) (1963)
- Scotland Yard vs Dr. Mabuse (Scotland Yard jagt Dr. Mabuse) (1963)
- The Phantom of Soho (Das Phantom von Soho) (1964)
- The Seventh Victim (Das siebente Opfer) (1964) a.k.a. The Racetrack Murders
- The Monster of London City (Das Ungeheuer von London City) (1964)
- The Deadly Avenger of Soho (Der Todesrächer von Soho) (1972, co-produced with Telecine Filmproduktion, Fernsehproduktion, and Fenix Films of Madrid) released in Spain as El muerto hace las maletas/ The Corpse Packs His Bags (based on Death Packs a Suitcase)
- The Dead Are Alive (Das Geheimnis des gelben Grabes/ Secret of the Yellow Graves) (1972, co-produced with Mondial Tefi of Rome and Inex Film of Belgrade) released in Italy as L'etrusco uccide ancora/ The Etruscan Kills Again.

(Note* - The Bird with the Crystal Plumage (Das Geheimnis der schwarzen Handschuhe/ Secret of the Black Gloves) (1970), the last of the CCC Filmkunst productions, was falsely marketed in West Germany as being based on a story by Bryan Edgar Wallace, but was actually adapted from Fredric Brown's novel, The Screaming Mimi.)

== Discography ==
(CDs predominately featuring the musical scores of Wallace movies)

- Kriminalfilmmusik von Martin Böttcher – Rough Trade, BSC 307.6518.2
- Kriminalfilmmusik von Martin Böttcher Vol. 2 – Prudence, BSC 398.6534.2
- Peter Thomas Kriminalfilmmusik – Prudence, BSC 398.6533.2
- Kriminalfilmmusik No. 4 – Prudence, BSC 398.6560.2
- Peter Thomas Film Musik – Polydor, 517,096-2 (one CD)
- Peter Thomas Film Musik – Polydor, 845,872–2 (two CDs)
