= The Monster of London City =

1964 West German crime film

- Directed by: Edwin Zbonek
- Written by: Robert A. Stemmle; Bryan Edgar Wallace
- Produced by: Artur Brauner; Heinz Willeg
- Starring: Hansjörg Felmy; Marianne Koch; Dietmar Schönherr
- Cinematography: Siegfried Hold
- Edited by: Walter Wischniewsky
- Music by: Martin Böttcher
- Production company: CCC Film
- Distributed by: Gloria Film
- Release date: 2 July 1964
- Running time: 90 minutes
- Country: West Germany
- Language: German

The Monster of London City (German: Das Ungeheuer von London-City) is a 1964 West German krimi crime film directed by Edwin Zbonek and starring Hansjörg Felmy, Marianne Koch, and Dietmar Schönherr.

The film's sets were designed by the art directors Hans Jürgen Kiebach and Ernst Schomer. It was shot at the Spandau Studios in Berlin and on location around London.

== Synopsis ==
A series of Jack the Ripper-style murders takes place in contemporary London, leaving Scotland Yard baffled. Coincidentally, a new play about Jack the Ripper is opening in London at the same time, and the lead actor who plays Jack becomes a suspect in the real-life killings.

== Cast ==
- Hansjörg Felmy as Richard Sand
- Marianne Koch as Ann Morlay
- Dietmar Schönherr as Dr. Morely Greely / Michael
- Hans Nielsen as Dorne
- Chariklia Baxevanos as Betty Ball
- Fritz Tillmann as Sir George
- Walter Pfeil as Horrlick
- Peer Schmidt as Teddy Flynn
- Kurd Pieritz as Maylor
- Elsa Wagner as Housekeeper
- Adelheid Hinz as Maid
- Gerda Blisse as Assistant
- Manfred Grote as Detective
- Kai Fischer as Helen Capstick
- Gudrun Schmidt as Evelyn Nichols

== Bibliography ==
- Robert C. Reimer & Reinhard Zachau. German Culture through Film: An Introduction to German Cinema. Hackett Publishing, 2017.
