= Love, Dance and a Thousand Songs =

1955 film

- Directed by: Paul Martin
- Written by: Curth Flatow; Frederick Kohner; Paul Martin
- Produced by: Artur Brauner
- Starring: Caterina Valente; Peter Alexander; Rudolf Platte
- Cinematography: Karl Löb
- Edited by: Walter Wischniewsky
- Music by: Heinz Gietz
- Production company: CCC Film
- Distributed by: Gloria Film
- Release date: 14 October 1955
- Running time: 103 minutes
- Country: West Germany
- Language: German

Love, Dance and a Thousand Songs (German: Liebe, Tanz und 1000 Schlager) is a 1955 West German musical comedy film directed by Paul Martin and starring Caterina Valente, Peter Alexander and Rudolf Platte. It is a revue film, showcasing a number of different performers. It was filmed at the Spandau Studios in West Berlin and on location around Mittenwald in Bavaria. The film's sets were designed by the art directors Hans Jürgen Kiebach and Gabriel Pellon.

== Cast ==
- Caterina Valente as Caterina
- Peter Alexander as Peter Alexander
- Rudolf Platte as Hugo Sauer
- Ruth Stephan as Wicky Winkler
- John W. Bubbles as John
- Werner Fuetterer as Heidemann
- Silvio Francesco as Silvio
- Hubert von Meyerinck as Director Winkler
- Henry Lorenzen as Paul
- Joachim Rake]as Herr Osterhagen
- Erik van Aro as Aro
- Bruno W. Pantel as Herr Mallwitz
- Willy A. Kleinau as Luigi
- Sunshine Quartett as Themselves
- Das Comedian Quartett as Themselves
- James and Cornell Jackson as Themselves
- Kurt Edelhagen as Orchester Kurt Edelhagen
- Hazy Osterwald as Orchester Hazy Osterwald
- Wandy Tworek as Geiger Tworek
- Die 3 Hill Billys as Musiker
- Bill Ramsey as Singer
- Jonny Teupen as Musiker
- Albert Vossen as Musiker
- Walter Bluhm as Fernsehreporter
- Wolf Harnisch as Inspizient

== Bibliography ==
- Bock, Hans-Michael & Bergfelder, Tim. The Concise CineGraph. Encyclopedia of German Cinema. Berghahn Books, 2009.
- Kapczynski, Jennifer M. & Richardson, Michael D. A New History of German Cinema. Boydell & Brewer, 2014.
