= The Phantom of Soho =

1964 West German crime film

- Directed by: Franz Josef Gottlieb
- Written by: Bryan Edgar Wallace (novel); Ladislas Fodor
- Produced by: Artur Brauner; Heinz Willeg
- Starring: Dieter Borsche; Barbara Rütting; Hans Söhnker
- Cinematography: Richard Angst
- Edited by: Walter Wischniewsky
- Music by: Martin Böttcher
- Production company: CCC Film
- Distributed by: Gloria Film
- Release date: 14 February 1964
- Running time: 97 minutes
- Country: West Germany
- Language: German

The Phantom of Soho (German: Das Phantom von Soho) is a 1964 West German crime film directed by Franz Josef Gottlieb and starring Dieter Borsche, Barbara Rütting and Hans Söhnker. It was shot at the Spandau Studios and on location in West Berlin. The film's sets were designed by the art directors Hans Jürgen Kiebach and Ernst Schomer.

It is based on a novel by Bryan Edgar Wallace and was part of a large group of British-set thrillers made in West Germany at the time, many of them adapted from the works of Wallace's father Edgar Wallace. It is the fifth of ten "Bryan Edgar Wallace" films produced by Artur Brauner, who sought to capitalize on the success of the Edgar Wallace film series.

The black-and-white film, shot in Ultrascope, premiered in West German cinemas on 14 February 1964.

== Plot ==
A man is stabbed to death in London's Soho district. Sergeant Hallam reports to Scotland Yard chief Sir Philip that £100 and an African wooden figurine were found in the victim's pockets. Chief Inspector Patton, an expert on Africa, takes charge of the case. He determines that the figurine is an imitation of an African fetish. He learns that the deceased is Archibald Bessell, a man with whom he had once undertaken several expeditions.

At the "Zanzibar", a nightclub of dubious reputation, Patton and Hallam encounter various unsavoury characters, including the manager Gilard, who has a criminal record, and the knife-thrower Jussuf. As the Yard officers are about to question him, he falls victim to the "Phantom". Money is again found on the body. Joanna Filiati, the wheelchair-bound bar owner, and her naturopath, Dr. Dalmer, secretly observe the goings-on through a one-way mirror. Both claim to know nothing specific about the murder victims. Suspicion also falls on a man with a distinctive birthmark who seems to be present whenever an incident occurs. Clarinda Smith, a crime novelist and acquaintance of Sir Philip, develops an interest in the murders and conducts her own investigations.

Meanwhile, Lord Harold Malhouse arrives at the "Zanzibar". Joanna Filiati and Dr. Dalmer are not pleased by his arrival. They instruct the club's photographer, Corinne Smith, to lure the lord to a nearby hotel that rents rooms by the hour. There, the Phantom kills Lord Harold. All trace of Corinne, who nearly witnessed the murder, is lost. In her apartment, investigators find photographs proving that the Phantom's victims were connected to one another. Meanwhile, Dr. Dalmer receives a visit from Captain Muggins, who tries to blackmail him. Shortly before the handover of money the Captain is stabbed to death by the Phantom in a dark side street. During a subsequent police sweep, Patton encounters Clarinda Smith, who is now engaged to Sir Philip, who Patton suspects is involved in Corinne's disappearance. When Patton sets out to follow his superior, he finds himself in a physical confrontation with the "Birthmark". The man had formerly worked as a ship's engineer. Sergeant Hallam has also learned that Captain Muggins was supposedly lost at sea years ago aboard a luxury yacht named the Yolanda.

Investigators discover the passenger list from the ship's final voyage. On board were the yacht's owner, Lord Harold Malhouse; Archibald Bessell; the man who would later become the knife-thrower Jussuf; and Dr. Dalmer. Meanwhile, the "Birthmark", a man from whom Scotland Yard had hoped to gain information, has taken his own life while in custody. Hoping to claim a reward offered by the insurance company, club manager Gilard reveals Corinne's whereabouts. However, at a motel just outside London, Patton does not find the Corinne, but instead Clarinda Smith. Upon learning of Gilard's murder, the two immediately return to London. After visiting the morgue, Sergeant Hallam shares his latest discovery: the passengers of the Yolanda were ruthless traffickers of narcotics and young women. Their ringleader, Joanna Filiati, had a clientele that included figures from high finance as well as members of the aristocracy.

Patton and Hallam wait at the airport for the fugitives Joanna Filiati and Dr. Dalmer, only to find the latter stabbed to death on the baggage carousel. The investigators spot Sir Philip escorting the missing Corinne Smith toward a plane. In the meantime, the Phantom has tracked down Joanna Filiati. At the last moment, Chief Inspector Patton wrests away the weapon and mask, revealing Clarinda Smith. She had once worked as a stewardess on the Yolanda. After the ship set sail, she was sexually assaulted by Lord Harold and other passengers. To silence her, she was bound and left to go down with the heavily insured yacht. However, she was rescued by the ship's engineer, the Birthmark. Instead of reporting her abusers to the police, Clarinda Smith lived only for revenge. During the interrogation, she bites into a poison capsule and dies in front of Patton and her fiancé, Sir Philip. Meanwhile, Sergeant Hallam has tracked down Corinne Smith, Clarinda's sister. To prevent Corinne from learning the Phantom's identity, Clarinda had asked Sir Philip to take Corinne to safety.

== Cast ==
- Dieter Borsche as Chief Inspector Hugh Patton
- Barbara Rütting as Clarinda Smith
- Hans Söhnker as Sir Philip
- Peter Vogel as Sergeant Hallam
- Helga Sommerfeld as Corinne Smith
- Werner Peters as Dr. Dalmer
- Hans Nielsen as Lord Harold Malhouse
- Stanislav Ledinek as Gilard, club manager
- Otto Waldis as William B. Clover, man with birthmark
- Hans W. Hamacher as Capt. Muggins
- Emil Feldmar as Papa Red
- Harald Sawade as Charlie
- Kurt Jaggberg as Jussuf
- Elisabeth Flickenschildt as Joanna Filiati

== Production history ==
=== Background and screenplay ===
Following the success of the Rialto Film Edgar Wallace series, distributed by Constantin Film starting in 1959, numerous other crime films following a similar formula were produced in the 1960s. In 1960, film producer Artur Brauner launched his own crime film series featuring the character Dr. Mabuse. Starting in 1962, his company, CCC Film, also released films based on material by Bryan Edgar Wallace, the son of the famous author.

In 1963, Brauner announced the Bryan Edgar Wallace film The Man with the Glass Eye (German: Der Mann mit dem Glasauge) in the trade publication Filmecho/Filmwoche. It is highly likely that The Phantom of Soho evolved from this initial project. Its screenplay was written by Ladislas Fodor. According to promotional materials and the opening credits, the film was based "on a novel by Bryan Edgar Wallace". Some sources, including the film poster, cite the novel Murder by Proxy as the source material, though no publication of such a book is known to exist. It can be assumed that Artur Brauner was exercising his right to use the name Bryan Edgar Wallace even for entirely original storylines.

It is possible that the treatment or original screenplay by Ladislas Fodor was later sold to Rialto Film, where it bore the working title The Cruel Doll (Die grausame Puppe). There, it may have been revised by Paul Hengge to serve as the basis for the 1969 Edgar Wallace film The Man with the Glass Eye. The fact that The Phantom of Soho and The Man with the Glass Eye share several plot parallels aligns with this practice, which was quite common in the film industry at the time. These parallels include, among other things, a revenge motive involving a woman forced into prostitution, her abduction by ship, and a female leader at the head of the criminal organisation.

=== Production ===
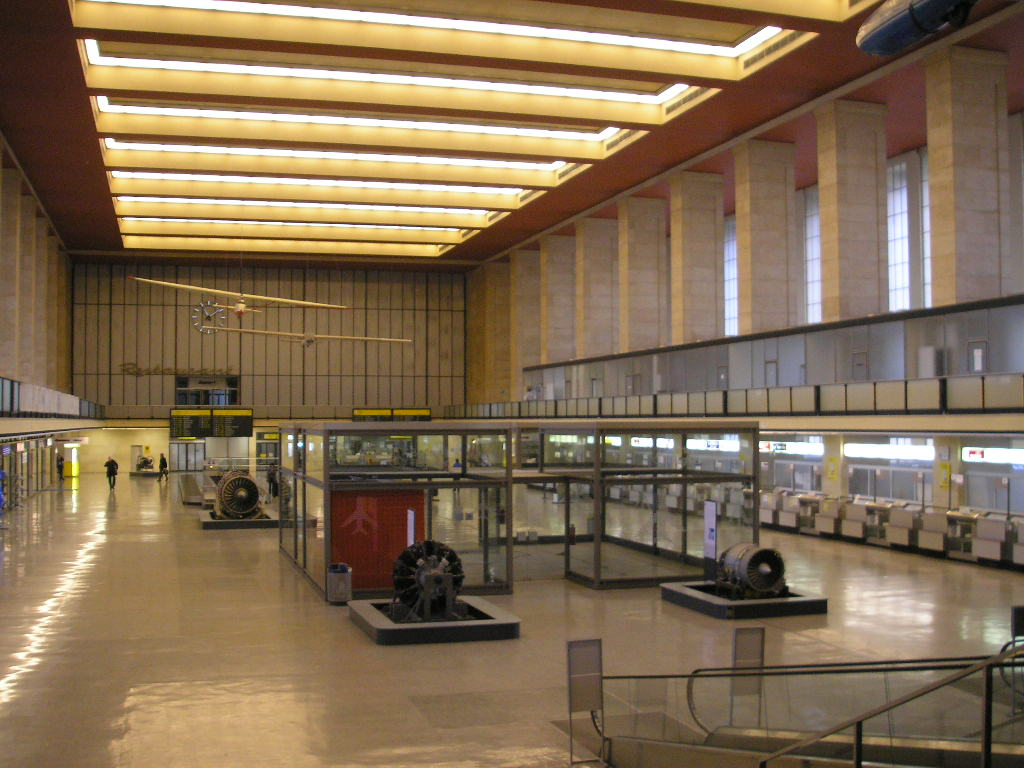
The film features, among other locations, the terminal hall at Berlin Tempelhof Airport.

Filming for the black-and-white movie, produced in Ultrascope and featuring a colour title sequence, took place in West Berlin between 18 November 1963 and 6 January 1964. The airport scenes were shot at Berlin Tempelhof Airport, while the studio sequences were filmed at the CCC Film Studios in Haselhorst, Spandau. Hans Jürgen Kiebach and Ernst Schomer were the production designers. Trude Ulrich was responsible for the costumes, and Heinz Willeg was the production manager.

=== Film score ===
The film score was composed by Martin Böttcher. The song "Soho" (lyrics by Doris Kirchner), featuring off-screen vocals by Tanja Berg, was originally released as a single on the Telefunken label. This version, which plays at the end of the film, was reissued on CD in 2006. Eight additional tracks, including the version of "Soho" used in the opening credits, are included on the 1996 CD Kriminalfilmmusik von Martin Böttcher:

1. Soho (Instrumental) 1:31
2. Striptease-Blues 3:08
3. "Zanzibar" Medley 5:27
  Midnight Bossa Nova
  Locomotion
  Puppentanz
  Holiday for Trombones
4. Phantom-Blues 2:57
5. Soho (Vocals: Tanja Berg) 2:04

== Release ==
The FSK approved The Phantom of Soho for audiences aged 18 and older on 6 February1964. Distributed by Gloria Film, the film premiered in West German cinemas on 14 February 1964. On 3 February 2006, the age rating was lowered from 16 to 12. The film was broadcast multiple times on German television and released on DVD in 2006.

The film was also distributed internationally, appearing under titles such as:

UK: The Phantom of Soho, also known as Murder by Proxy
United States: The Phantom of Soho
Denmark: Fantomet fra Soho (The Phantom of Soho)
Finland: Sohon aavemurhaaja (The Soho Ghost Killer)
Greece: O fantomas tou Londinou (The Phantom of London)
Italy: Il fantasma di Soho (The Ghost of Soho)
Mexico: Crímenes siniestros (Sinister crimes)
Netherlands: Sex en moord in Soho (Sex and Murder in Soho)

== Critical reception ==
"Unfortunately, one of the Phantom's victims is something that would have fitted right in among the many horror props: humour. Had the film taken itself a little less seriously, it would surely have turned out even better." – Hamburger Abendblatt, 11 March 1964

"Offering—within a narrative of murky logic—a blend of thrills (stemming from the setting: Soho, though convincingly recreated in Spandau) and humour […]; featuring fluid direction […] and carefully composed, well-lit visuals." – Paimann's Filmlisten, 22 April 1964

"A trivial crime film based on an idea by Bryan Edgar Wallace, son of the popular crime novelist." – Lexikon des Internationalen Films
