= The Testament of Dr. Mabuse (1962 film) =

- Directed by: Werner Klingler
- Screenplay by: Ladislas Fodor; Robert A. Stemmle
- Produced by: Artur Brauner
- Starring: Wolfgang Preiss; Gert Fröbe; Senta Berger; Helmut Schmid
- Cinematography: Albert Benitz
- Edited by: Walter Wischniewsky
- Music by: Raimund Rosenberger
- Production company: CCC Filmkunst GmbH
- Distributed by: Constantin Film Verleih GmbH (München)
- Release date: 2 September 1962 (Germany)
- Running time: 88 minutes
- Country: West Germany
- Language: German

The Testament of Dr. Mabuse (German: Das Testament des Dr. Mabuse) is a 1962 German film directed by Werner Klingler. It was the fourth part of the Dr. Mabuse series from the 1960s and was a remake of the 1933 Fritz Lang film The Testament of Dr. Mabuse.

== Cast ==
Cast adapted from Filmportal.de:

- Wolfgang Preiss as Dr. Mabuse
- Gert Fröbe as Kriminalkommissar Lohmann
- Senta Berger as Nelly
- Helmut Schmid as Johnny Brigge
- Charles Régnier as Mortimer
- Walter Rilla as Prof. Pohland
- Harald Juhnke as Kriminalassistent Krüger
- Leon Askin as Flocke
- Anneli Sauli as Wackel-Heidi
- Claus Tinney as Jack

== Production ==
In 1962, producer Artur Brauner set-up a new mini-studio of CCC Film called CCC Filmkunst (transl. CCC Art film). This production outfit was set to make three films a year on lower budgets with more freedom to develop a film, which included The Testament of Dr. Mabuse. The Testament of Dr. Mabuse was shot on location in Berlin and at the Spandau Studios between May 16 and May 23, 1962.

== Release ==
The Testament of Dr. Mabuse was distributed theatrically in West Germany by Constantin Film on September 2, 1962. The film was released in 1965 in the United States and was the last of the Dr. Mabuse films to be released theatrically there.

== Reception ==
From contemporary reviews, an anonymous reviewer in the Monthly Film Bulletin reviewed an 88 minute English-dubbed version of the film. The reviewer declared the film "another black mark on the West Germany industry" and "one of the worst of the recent batch of Dr. Mabuse fabrications". He also wrote that despite borrowing elements from Fritz Lang's original film, "lacks even a glimpse of Lang's dramatic flair [...] Things are made worse by an extremely tatty production—somewhat reminiscent of British films of the '30s" and poor quality dubbing.
