= The Sinful Border =

1951 film directed by Robert A. Stemmle

- Directed by: Robert A. Stemmle
- Written by: Artur Brauner; Gerda Corbett; Marta Moyland; Robert A. Stemmle
- Produced by: Artur Brauner
- Starring: Dieter Borsche; Inge Egger; Peter Mosbacher; Jan Hendriks
- Cinematography: Igor Oberberg
- Edited by: Walter Wischniewsky
- Music by: Herbert Trantow
- Production company: CCC Films
- Distributed by: Prisma-Filmverleih
- Release date: 8 November 1951
- Running time: 87 minutes
- Country: West Germany
- Language: German

The Sinful Border (German: Sündige Grenze) is a 1951 West German crime film directed by Robert A. Stemmle and starring Dieter Borsche, Inge Egger and Peter Mosbacher. Jan Hendriks won the German Film Award as Best Newcomer. It focuses on the smuggling of coffee, at the time an expensive luxury, into Germany. It is also known by the alternative title of Illegal Border.

It was shot at the Spandau Studios in Berlin and on location in the Harz Mountains. The film's sets were designed by the art directors Mathias Matthies and Ellen Schmidt.

== Cast ==
- Dieter Borsche as Hans Fischer
- Inge Egger as Marianne Mertens
- Peter Mosbacher as Zollkommissar Dietrich
- Jan Hendriks as Jan Krapp
- Julia Fjorsen as Cilly
- Gisela von Collande as Mutter Mertens
- Alice Treff as Mutter Walters
- Ilse Furstenberg
- Eva Bubat
- Maria Secher
- Hendrikje Simonis
- Ernst Schroder as Hugo Mielke
- Adolf Dell as Vater Mertens
- Adalbert Koffler
- Hans Dieter Zeidler
- Arthur Mainzer
- Hans Halden
- Erich Dunskus
- Cornelia Froboess as Bertha
- Wolfgang Jansen as Heinz Mertens

== Bibliography ==
- Baer, Hester. Dismantling the Dream Factory: Gender, German Cinema, and the Postwar Quest for a New Film Language. Berghahn Books, 2012.
