= The Strangler of Blackmoor Castle =

1963 film

- German: Der Würger von Schloß Blackmoor
- Directed by: Harald Reinl
- Screenplay by: Ladislas Fodor; Gustav Kampendonk
- Story by: Bryan Edgar Wallace
- Produced by: Artur Brauner
- Starring: Karin Dor; Harry Riebauer; Rudolf Fernau
- Cinematography: Ernst W. Kalinke
- Edited by: Walter Wischniewsky
- Music by: Oskar Sala
- Production companies: CCC Film; Mosaik Film
- Distributed by: Gloria Film
- Release date: 21 June 1963
- Running time: 89 minutes
- Country: West Germany
- Language: German

The Strangler of Blackmoor Castle (German: Der Würger von Schloß Blackmoor) is a 1963 West German thriller film directed by Harald Reinl and starring Karin Dor, Harry Riebauer and Rudolf Fernau. It was based on a story by Bryan Edgar Wallace and was part of a trend of British-set thrillers inspired by Rialto Film's series of adaptations of his father Edgar Wallace's work.

== Plot ==
A series of murders are committed by a masked assailant take place near Blackmoor Castle, whose gruesome calling card is to carve the letter 'M' into the decapitated heads of their victims. The assassin demands that the tenant, the soon-to-be-ennobled Lucius Clark, claims to be the rightful owner of stolen rough diamonds that Clark has hidden on the property. Clark initially suspects the phantom of being the actual owner of the castle, the impoverished Lord Blackmoor. But soon, more suspects emerge.

== Cast ==
- Karin Dor as Claridge Dorsett
- Harry Riebauer as Inspector Jeff Mitchell
- Rudolf Fernau as Lucius Clark
- Hans Nielsen as Tavish
- Dieter Eppler as Anthony
- Hans Reiser as Mike Pierce
- Richard Häussler as Dr. Tromby
- Walter Giller as Lord Edgar Blackmoor
- Ingmar Zeisberg as Judy/"Lady L'Amour"
- Peter Nestler as Tom
- Gerhard Hartig as Sergeant Watson
- Albert Bessler as Sebastian
- Carl de Vogt as Doctor
- Stephan Schwartz as Philip "Phips"

== Production ==
The film was shot at Spandau Studios and on-location in Berlin, while a second unit traveled to London to shoot some location exteriors. The exteriors of "Blackmoor Castle" were shot at Mendelssohn Palace and at Park Glienicke. The film's sets were designed by the art director Werner Achmann.

== Release ==
The film premiered in Cologne in 21 June 1963.

=== Home media ===
A remastered Blu-Ray was released by Eureka Entertainment as part of their Terror in Fog: Wallace Krimi at CCC boxset, in May 2025.

== Bibliography ==
- Bergfelder, Tim (2005) [2004]. International Adventures: German Popular Cinema and European Co-Productions in the 1960s. New York: Berghahn Books. ISBN 978-1-57181-539-2.
- Goble, Alan (1999). The Complete Index to Literary Sources in Film. Walter de Gruyter. ISBN 978-3-11-095194-3.
