= The Passerby (1982 film) =

- Directed by: Jacques Rouffio
- Written by: Joseph Kessel (novel); Jacques Kirsner; Jacques Rouffio
- Produced by: Artur Brauner; Raymond Danon; Jean Kerchner
- Starring: Romy Schneider; Michel Piccoli; Helmut Griem
- Cinematography: Jean Penzer
- Edited by: Anna Ruiz
- Music by: Georges Delerue
- Production companies: CCC Film; Films A2
- Distributed by: Parafrance Films; Scotia International Filmverleih
- Release date: 14 April 1982
- Running time: 110 minutes
- Countries: France; West Germany
- Language: French

The Passerby (original French title: La passante du Sans-Souci, "The Passerby of Sans-Souci") is a 1982 French-West German drama film directed by Jacques Rouffio, based on the 1936 novel on the same name by Joseph Kessel, and starring Romy Schneider and Michel Piccoli. It was Schneider's last film.

It was shot at the Spandau Studios in Berlin and on location in Berlin and Paris. The film's sets were designed by the art director Hans Jürgen Kiebach.

== Plot ==
At the Paraguayan embassy in Paris, Max Baumstein, respected chairman of an international human rights organisation, shoots the ambassador dead in cold blood. Arrested and charged with murder, he tries to explains to his agonised wife Lina what led him to this act.

As a child in Berlin in 1933, his father was shot dead in front of him by Nazi thugs and he was beaten, leaving him lame for life. Michel and Elsa, a couple in a neighbouring apartment, took care of the traumatised boy. When Michel's business was vandalised by Nazis, he put Elsa and Max on a train to Paris and later sent them money via a friendly French salesman, Maurice. Michel was sentenced to five years in a concentration camp for anti-Nazi activity, leaving Elsa and the boy free but stranded. Elsa tried to get work singing in a club but ended up as a “hostess”. Fond of both her and Max, Maurice took care of the boy. At the club Elsa caught the eye of von Legaart, a diplomat at the German embassy in Paris, who agreed to get Michel released in return for a night with her. When Elsa met Michel at the railway station, von Legaart had both murdered.

At his trial, Max relates how Maurice took him to safety in Switzerland, from where he has devoted the rest of his life to fighting the evils that led to the death of everybody he loved. When his organisation discovered that the Paraguayan ambassador was von Legaart under an assumed name, he only saw one way to achieve justice. The court sentences him to five years suspended and he walks free with Lina, to abuse and threats from neo-Nazis. An end title notes that six months later he and Lina were murdered by unknown assassins.

== Cast and roles ==
- Romy Schneider as Elsa Wiener / Lina Baumstein
- Michel Piccoli as Max Baumstein
- Helmut Griem as Michel Wiener
- Dominique Labourier as Charlotte Maupas
- Gérard Klein as Maurice Bouillard
- Mathieu Carrière as Ruppert von Legaart / Federico Lego
- Jacques Martin as Marcel, a cabaret artist
- Wendelin Werner as young Max
- Marcel Bozonnet as Mercier
- Christiane Cohendy as Hélène Nolin
- Pierre Michaël as M^{e} Jouffroy
- Véronique Silver as presiding judge
- Maria Schell as Anna Hellwig
- Raymond Aquilon
- Béatrice Avoine
- Martine de Breteuil
- Arnaud Carbonnier
- Patricia Cartier
- André Chaumeau
- Alain MacMoy
- Stephan Meldegg
- Jacques Nolot
- Pierre Pernet
- Jean Reno as neo-Nazi
- Isabelle Sadoyan

== Bibliography ==
- Annette Insdorf. Indelible Shadows: Film and the Holocaust. Cambridge University Press, 2003.
