= The Return of Doctor Mabuse =

1961 film directed by Harald Reinl

- German film poster
- Directed by: Harald Reinl
- Screenplay by: Ladislas Fodor; Marc Behm
- Produced by: Artur Brauner
- Starring: Gert Fröbe; Lex Barker; Daliah Lavi; Fausto Tozzi
- Cinematography: Karl Löb
- Edited by: Hermann Haller
- Music by: Peter Sandloff
- Production companies: CCC Film; Critérion Film S.A.; SPA Cinematografica
- Distributed by: Variety Distribution
- Release dates: 13 October 1961 (West Germany); 3 May 1962 (Italy); 10 June 1962 (France)
- Running time: 89 minutes
- Countries: West Germany; France; Italy

The Return of Doctor Mabuse (German: Im Stahlnetz des Dr. Mabuse) is a 1961 black-and-white crime film/thriller made in West Berlin. It was a West German/French/Italian international co-production directed by Harald Reinl that was the second of the 1960s CCC Films Dr. Mabuse film series, being the sequel to Fritz Lang's The Thousand Eyes of Dr. Mabuse (1960). It starred Gert Fröbe, Daliah Lavi and in his first German film, Lex Barker. The film was co-written by Ladislas Fodor and, in his first screenplay, Marc Behm. They created a science fictional plot that would be followed in the other films in the series.

It was shot at the Spandau Studios and on location around Berlin. The film's sets were designed by the art directors Otto Erdmann and Hans Jürgen Kiebach.

The German title Im Stahlnetz des Dr. Mabuse was a reference to the popular German police procedural television show of the time, Stahlnetz. In 1966, the 1960s Dr. Mabuse films were released in the United States to tie in with Gert Fröbe's fame in the role of Auric Goldfinger with this film being renamed The Phantom Fiend.

== Plot ==
Inspector Lohmann's eagerly awaited fishing holiday is put on hold when he is called to investigate the murder of a man found in a railway tunnel. He was an Interpol courier carrying proof of the Chicago Syndicate's planned cooperation with a European criminal organisation in an attache case chained to, but now missing from, his body. The Inspector gets word from Washington D.C. that a female representative of the Syndicate, Mrs. Pizarro, is currently in Europe to meet up with the European criminals, and that the Federal Bureau of Investigation is sending Special Agent Joe Como to liaise with the German authorities. In an unsuccessful bid to learn more about the upcoming events, Lohmann meets with Alberto Sandro, an imprisoned member of the European criminal organisation.

Mrs. Pizarro is murdered by a flame thrower with Inspector Lohmann dodging questions from female reporter Maria Sabrehm who happens to be near the location of the murder, as is Joe Como. The only witness is a blind man who recalls the distinctive sound of a man with a wooden leg before he felt the heat of the flamethrower. Lohmann discovers a book on the charred body of Mrs. Pizarro called The Devil's Anatomy written by Reverend Briefenstein of St. Thomas Church. Lohmann looks through the book whose thesis is that though the Devil is a spirit, he can manifest himself into doing evil by taking the form of a werewolf, vampire or Dr. Mabuse. Lohmann, followed by Como and Maria, meets the Pastor in his church to ask about Dr. Mabuse who everyone believes is dead. The Pastor says that though a man's body can die, his soul can infest the bodies of other men. The voice of Dr. Mabuse comes over the speaker system of the church warning Lohmann to stop his investigation. As Lohmann wanders through the church, Joe Como engages in a conversation with Mabuse saying he is really Nick Scappio, the representative of the Chicago Syndicate who is there to negotiate a shipment of a new drug into the United States. However, before the Chicago Syndicate will cooperate they demand to see proof of the power of the drug.

Following his only lead, Lohmann goes to obtain further information from the blind witness who is run over and killed. Como and Lohmann pursue the murderer that turns out to be Alberto Sandro who has apparently escaped from the prison. Recapturing him, the prison authorities, who maintain an industrial laundry allowing trusted prisoners to deliver and pick up cleaning in the community, deny Sandro has left the prison. The warden insists Sandro is sedated in his cell. They discover that the person in Sandro's cell is the dead man with a wooden leg who the blind man had identified.

Dr. Mabuse's drug, invented by Maria's scientist father who is a prisoner in the same prison as Sandro, is a mind control device capable of turning a person into a zombie whose actions can be controlled by radio transmissions. Mabuse not only has an army of criminals who can come and go from the prison but can be commanded to do criminal acts that they will have no recollection of later on. In the meantime Lohmann's assistant gets the fingerprints of Como and transmits them to FBI headquarters who declare that the fingerprints of the man calling himself Como is not the real Agent Como. Como/Scappio is sent to the prison. He discovers Dr. Mabuse's display of the power of his drug to the Chicago Syndicate will come on Friday the 13th (the date of the film's premiere); when every prisoner will be injected with the mind control drug, armed with weapons and released in order to launch an armed assault to destroy a nearby nuclear power plant.

== Cast ==
- Gert Fröbe as Inspector Lohmann
- Lex Barker as Joe Como/Nick Scappio
- Daliah Lavi as Maria Sabrehm
- Fausto Tozzi as Warden Wolf
- Werner Peters as Böhmler
- Wolfgang Preiss as Dr. Mabuse
- Rudolf Forster as Professor Julius Sabrehm
- Rudolf Fernau as Pastor Briefenstein
- Joachim Mock as Detective Voss
- Laura Solari as Mrs. Pizarro
- Ady Berber as Alberto Sandro
- Henry Coubet as Blinder
- Jean-Roger Caussimon as Küster
- Albert Bessler as Trödler
- Lou Seitz as Mrs. Lohmann

== Release ==
The Return of Dr. Mabuse was distributed in West Germany by Constantin Film 13 October 1961. In 1962, it was released in Italy as F.B.I. contro Dr. Mabuse on 3 May and France on 10 June as Le retour du Docteur Mabuse.

== Reception ==
From contemporary reviews, an anonymous reviewer in the Monthly Film Bulletin was excited to welcome "just about any comeback by the greatest metaphysical villain of them all", but the reviewer wrote that the film was a "boringly photographed and atrociously dubbed low budget vehicle [...] is a sad showcase for the Doctor's talents."
