= The Seventh Victim (1964 film) =

- Directed by: Franz Josef Gottlieb
- Written by: Franz Josef Gottlieb
- Based on: Murder Is Not Enough; 1964 novel by Bryan Edgar Wallace
- Produced by: Artur Brauner; Götz Dieter Wulf
- Starring: Hansjörg Felmy; Ann Smyrner; Hans Nielsen
- Cinematography: Richard Angst
- Edited by: Walter Wischniewsky
- Music by: Raimund Rosenberger
- Production companies: CCC Film; Mosaik Film
- Distributed by: Nora-Film
- Release date: 27 November 1964
- Running time: 93 minutes
- Country: West Germany
- Language: German

The Seventh Victim (German: Das siebente Opfer) is a 1964 West German thriller film directed by Franz Josef Gottlieb and starring Hansjörg Felmy, Ann Smyrner and Hans Nielsen.

The film is based on a novel by Bryan Edgar Wallace, one of several films made in an attempt to capitalize on Rialto Film's successful series of adaptions of the novels of his father, Edgar Wallace. It was shot at Spandau Studios in West Berlin with sets designed by art director Hans Jürgen Kiebach and Ernst Schomer.

The film is also known by the alternative title The Racetrack Murders.

== Plot summary ==
Lord John Mant (Walter Rilla) owns a prized thoroughbred horse favored to win the prestigious Royal Ascot race. But not everyone wants to see it cross the finish line. Someone is willing to kill to stop it, and the body count keeps rising.

Peter Brooks (Hansjörg Felmy), a cartoonist drawn into the chaos surrounding the Mant estate, finds himself untangling a web of betting fraud, shady inheritance schemes, and cold-blooded revenge. The murders grow more brazen with each victim: a snake thrown into a horse's path, a trumpet player shot mid-solo, others dispatched by pitchfork, harpoon, and hangman's noose. Inspector Bradley (Heinz Engelmann) works the case as the killings stack up around Lord Mant's inner circle.

At the center of it all lurks the menacing Ed Ranova (Wolfgang Lukschy), a ruthless loan shark squeezing Gerald Mant (Helmuth Lohner) dry, and the enigmatic Reverend Turner (Hans Nielsen), whose pious front masks something far darker. Avril Mant (Ann Smyrner), Lord John's daughter, gets pulled deeper into danger as Brooks races to expose a conspiracy rooted in a death that may not have been as final as it seemed, a man executed years earlier whose shadow appears to fall over every new crime.

As Brooks and Inspector Bradley close in, the film builds to a tense, gun-filled standoff that finally rips the mask off the killers — and reveals who has been orchestrating the murders all along.

== Cast ==
- Hansjörg Felmy as Peter Brooks
- Ann Smyrner as Avril Mant
- Hans Nielsen as Reverend Turner
- Wolfgang Lukschy as Ed Ranova
- Heinz Engelmann as Inspector Bradley
- Helmuth Lohner as Gerald Mant
- Walter Rilla as Lord John Mant
- Harry Riebauer as Dr. Howard Trent
- Trude Herr as Molly Dobson
- Alice Treff as Jenny Stratford
- Anneli Sauli as Yo Ma
- Friedrich G. Beckhaus as Edward Palmer
- Edgar Wenzel as Giuseppe Ranova
- Rolf Eden as Ed Ranova's Bodyguard
- Peter Vogel as Butler Irving
- Dieter Borsche as Mysterious Man at Club
- Werner Peters as Mysterious Man at Party
- Rolf Zacher as Waiter at Club

== Bibliography ==
- Bergfelder, Tim. International Adventures: German Popular Cinema and European Co-Productions in the 1960s. Berghahn Books, 2005.
- Goble, Alan. The Complete Index to Literary Sources in Film. Walter de Gruyter, 1999.
