= The Secret of the Black Trunk =

1962 film

- Directed by: Werner Klingler
- Written by: Gustav Kampendonk
- Based on: Death Packs a Suitcase by Bryan Edgar Wallace
- Produced by: Artur Brauner
- Starring: Joachim Hansen; Senta Berger; Hans Reiser
- Cinematography: Richard Angst
- Edited by: Walter Wischniewsky
- Music by: Gert Wilden
- Production company: CCC Film
- Distributed by: Gloria Film
- Release date: 23 February 1962
- Running time: 85 minutes
- Country: West Germany
- Language: German

The Secret of the Black Trunk (German: Das Geheimnis der schwarzen Koffer) is a 1962 West German crime thriller film directed by Werner Klingler and starring Joachim Hansen, Senta Berger and Hans Reiser. It is based on the novel Death Packs a Suitcase by British writer Bryan Edgar Wallace. The film's sets were designed by the art directors Paul Markwitz and Wilhelm Vorwerg. It was shot at the Spandau Studios in West Berlin. It was produced at the time a successful series of films were produced based on the novels of Byran's father Edgar Wallace.

== Cast ==
- Joachim Hansen as Inspector Robert Finch
- Senta Berger as Susan Brown
- Hans Reiser as Humphrey Curtis, Schriftsteller
- Leonard Steckel as Doctor Daniel Bransby
- Chris Howland as Arnold Wickerley
- Helga Sommerfeld as Lissy, Tänzerin
- Stanislav Ledinek as Kudernacz
- Elfriede Irrall as Diana
- Zeev Berlinsky as Garnett
- Kurt Waitzmann as Geschäftsführer der Soho-Bar
- Hans W. Hamacher as Sergeant Cannings
- Heinrich Gies as Ellison, Chefinspektor
- Gerhard Hartig as Mr. Forester
- Peter Carsten as Ponko, ein Bettler
- Albert Bessler as FBI-Mann Harris
- Carl de Vogt as Patient

== Bibliography ==
- Bergfelder, Tim. International Adventures: German Popular Cinema and European Co-Productions in the 1960s. Berghahn Books, 2005.
- Kramp, Joachim· Hallo! Hier spricht Edgar Wallace: die Geschichte der deutschen Kriminalfilmserie 1959-1972. Schwarzkopf & Schwarzkopf, 2001.
- Kujacinski Dona. Horst Wendlandt. Schwarzkopf & Schwarzkopf, 2016.
