= Confess, Doctor Corda =

1958 film directed by Josef von Báky

- Directed by: Josef von Báky
- Written by: Robert A. Stemmle
- Produced by: Artur Brauner; Horst Wendlandt
- Starring: Hardy Krüger; Elisabeth Müller; Lucie Mannheim; Hans Nielsen
- Cinematography: Göran Strindberg
- Edited by: Walter Wischniewsky
- Music by: Georg Haentzschel
- Production company: CCC Film
- Distributed by: Europa Film
- Release date: 22 May 1958
- Running time: 93 minutes
- Country: West Germany
- Language: German

Confess, Doctor Corda (German: Gestehen Sie, Dr. Corda) is a 1958 West German crime film directed by Josef von Báky and starring Hardy Krüger, Elisabeth Müller and Lucie Mannheim. It is considered to be a film noir, one of a number made in Germany during the decade. It was shot at the Spandau Studios. The film's sets were designed by the art directors Erich Kettelhut and Helmut Nentwig.

== Plot ==
A doctor goes to a meet a young woman in a park at night, only to find that she has been murdered before he got there. The police consider him the prime suspect, and put him under considerable pressure to confess.

== Cast ==
- Hardy Krüger as Dr. Fred Corda
- Elisabeth Müller as Beate Corda
- Lucie Mannheim as Mrs. Bieringer
- Hans Nielsen as Dr. Nagel
- Fritz Tillmann as Dr. Pohlhammer
- Eva Pflug as Gabriele Montag
- Rudolf Fernau as Professor Schliessmann
- Siegfried Lowitz as Inspektor Guggitz
- Emmy Burg as Oberin
- Lore Hartling as Schwester Antonia
- Paul Edwin Roth as Dr. Schimmer
- Ernst Sattler as Vater von Corda
- Albert Bessler as Dr. Dollheubel
- Jochen Blume as Untersuchungsrichter
- Alfred Balthoff as Detektiv Juch
- Roma Bahn as Ehemalige Krankenschwester
- Werner Buttler as Dr. Feldmacher
- Reinhard Kolldehoff as Kriminalbeamter Kerndl
- Georg Gütlich as Polizeiarzt Dr. Gruber
- Hans Binner as Mörder
- Sigrid Hackenberg as Schwester Emerentia
- Ursula Hoeflich as Schwester Veronika
- Maria Krasna as Frau im Carmen-Kostüm
- Barbara Wieczik as Susi Corda

== Bibliography ==
- Spicer, Andrew. Historical Dictionary of Film Noir. Scarecrow Press, 2010.
