= Grounds for Divorce (1960 film) =

- German film poster
- German: Scheidungsgrund: Liebe
- Directed by: Cyril Frankel
- Written by: Ellinor Hartung (novel); Ladislas Fodor
- Produced by: Artur Brauner; Horst Wendlandt
- Starring: O. W. Fischer; Dany Robin; Violetta Ferrari
- Cinematography: Klaus von Rautenfeld
- Edited by: Hermann Haller; Gisela Neumann
- Music by: Helmut Zacharias
- Production company: CCC Film
- Distributed by: Bavaria Film
- Release date: 26 August 1960
- Running time: 85 minutes
- Country: West Germany
- Language: German

Grounds for Divorce or Grounds for Divorce: Love (German: Scheidungsgrund: Liebe) is a 1960 West German romantic comedy film directed by Cyril Frankel and starring O. W. Fischer, Dany Robin and Violetta Ferrari.

The film's sets were designed by the art directors Hans Jürgen Kiebach and Helmut Nentwig. It was made at the Spandau Studios in West Berlin.

== Cast ==
- O. W. Fischer as Dr. Thomas Werther
- Dany Robin as Marylin
- Violetta Ferrari as Lorelei Kindl
- Alice Treff as Marylins Mutter Evelyn
- Ernst Stankovski as Tullio
- Heinrich Gretler as Richter
- Ralf Wolter as Dr. Waldgeist
- Peter W. Staub
- Bruno W. Pantel
- Erich Poremski
- Heinz Peter Scholz
- Hugo Lindinger
