= The Hangman of London =

1963 film directed by Edwin Zbonek

- Directed by: Edwin Zbonek
- Written by: Robert A. Stemmle
- Based on: The White Carpet by Bryan Edgar Wallace
- Produced by: Artur Brauner
- Starring: Hansjörg Felmy; Maria Perschy; Dieter Borsche
- Cinematography: Richard Angst
- Edited by: Walter Wischniewsky
- Music by: Raimund Rosenberger
- Production company: CCC Film
- Distributed by: Columbia-Bavaria Filmgesellschaft
- Release date: 22 November 1963
- Running time: 94 minutes
- Country: West Germany
- Language: German

The Hangman of London (German: Der Henker von London) is a 1963 West German mystery crime film directed by Edwin Zbonek and starring Hansjörg Felmy, Maria Perschy and Dieter Borsche. It is based on the novel The White Carpet by Bryan Edgar Wallace. The film was shot at the Spandau Studios in West Berlin and on location in London. The film's sets were designed by the art directors Hans Jürgen Kiebach and Ernst Schomer. It was produced at the same time as Rialto Film were enjoying great success with their series of films based on the works of Edgar Wallace, Bryan's father. It is also known by the alternative title The Mad Executioners, by which it was released by Paramount Pictures in the United States in 1965.

== Synopsis ==
In London, police face two separate series of crimes. An underground "court" is trying and executing heinous criminals, while a deranged physician is murdering woman to assist his scientific experiments. Inspector Smith of Scotland Yard conducts the investigation into both killing sprees.

== Cast ==
- Hansjörg Felmy as John Hillier
- Maria Perschy as Ann Barry
- Dieter Borsche as Dr. Mac Ferguson
- Wolfgang Preiss as Inspector Morel Smith
- Harry Riebauer as Dr. Philip Trooper
- Rudolf Fernau as Jerome
- Rudolf Forster as Sir Francis Elliott - Ann's Father
- Chris Howland as Tom Jenkins - alias Gabby Pennypacker
- Alexander Engel as Bodenspekulant
- Narziss Sokatscheff as Messerjoe
  - Michael Chevalier as Messerjoe (German voice)
- Harald Sawade as Familienmörder
- Albert Bessler as Francois Bréant
- Stanislav Ledinek as Jimmy Brown
- Günter Glaser as Museumschef
- Bruno W. Pantel as Schausteller
- Heinz Petruo as Stimme des Henkers
- Edwin Zbonek as Zettelfinder

== Bibliography ==
- Bergfelder, Tim. International Adventures: German Popular Cinema and European Co-Productions in the 1960s. Berghahn Books, 2005.
- Kramp, Joachim· Hallo! Hier spricht Edgar Wallace: die Geschichte der deutschen Kriminalfilmserie 1959–1972. Schwarzkopf & Schwarzkopf, 2001.
