= The Peking Medallion =

1967 film by James Hill

- Original film poster by Frank McCarthy
- Directed by: James Hill; Frank Winterstein (assistant director)
- Written by: Harold Bloom; Brian Clemens
- Produced by: Artur Brauner
- Starring: Elke Sommer; Robert Stack; Nancy Kwan; Werner Peters
- Cinematography: Heinz Pehlke
- Edited by: Alfred Srp
- Music by: Georges Garvarentz
- Production company: CCC Film
- Distributed by: Constantin Film (West Germany); Warner Bros. Pictures (UK & US)
- Release date: 20 January 1967
- Running time: 93 minutes (Germany)
- Countries: West Germany; France; Italy
- Language: English

The Peking Medallion (also known as The Corrupt Ones and Hell to Macao; Germany: Die Hölle von Macao) is a 1967 crime film directed by James Hill, starring Elke Sommer, Robert Stack, Nancy Kwan and Werner Peters. The film was a co-production between France, Italy and West Germany although it was shot in English.

Stack called it "a derring-do, hidden treasure stinker" which he did for the money and because he admired Hill's Born Free (1966).

== Synopsis ==
A freelance photographer discovers an ancient treasure, the Peking Medallion, which also attracts the attention of a number of criminal gangs.

== Cast ==
- Elke Sommer as Lilly Mancini
- Robert Stack as Cliff Wilder
- Nancy Kwan as Tina
- Werner Peters as Pinto
- Christian Marquand as Jay Brandon
- Maurizio Arena as Mancini
- Richard Haller as Kua-Song
- Hans Heyde as Hugo
- Marisa Merlini as Madame Vulcano

== Production ==
It was made at the Spandau Studios in Berlin with location shooting in Hong Kong. The film's sets were designed by the art directors Hans Jürgen Kiebach and Ernst Schomer.

== Music ==
The title song "The Corrupt Ones", was performed by Dusty Springfield. It appeared as the B-side of her US Top 40 single "I'll Try Anything" in early 1967.

== Reception ==
The Monthly Film Bulletin wrote: "The machinations of two criminal rings to uncover long-lost treasure appears somewhat quaint and old-fashioned after the intricacies of the spy formula, although attempts have been made to up-date the theme with an excessive emphasis on exposed flesh and some particularly sadistic torture scenes. James Hill's direction gives the film some kind of style and pace, in spite of a thoroughly portentous script. Performances are generally rather wooden apart from Werner Peters' police chief."

Variety wrote: "Pic is an old-fashioned meller, updated with overdone sadistic bits and a little sex. ... There is no tongue in cheek, and the action is straightforward robbers-and-robbers material, but routine. Stack, for example, is necking with every dame he meets within 60 seconds; the plotting also is cliche in various menacing expressions. ... James Hill, who also directed Born Free, has less interesting material with which to work, although his use of Stack and minor players is okay. Miss Sommer has one fixed expression, except when she is being tortured by Miss Kwan, herself changing from dead pan in these brief moments."

Tony Mastroianni's review for the Cleveland Press stated the film was "handsomely photographed" and merited recognition for its pace but he also criticized "unnecessarily sadistic torture sequences".
