= Bryan Edgar Wallace =

British writer (1904–1971)

- Born: 28 April 1904; London, England; United Kingdom
- Died: 1971 (aged 67)
- Occupation: Writer

Bryan Edgar Wallace (28 April 1904 – 1971) was an English author and screenwriter. The son of the writer Edgar Wallace, Bryan was also a writer of crime and mystery novels which were very similar in style to those of his father. He was named after the American politician William Jennings Bryan whom his father encountered during a trip to North America.

Some of his better known novels are Death Packs a Suitcase, The Strangler of Blackmoor Castle, Murder is Not Enough, The Device, The Man Who Would Not Swim, Murder in Touraine, The White Carpet, The Phantom of Soho and The World is at Stake, among others. During the 1930s, he worked as a screenwriter in the British film industry, mostly co-writing film scripts with other writers (approximately from 1930 to 1939).

From 1961 until 1971, several of his works were made into films during the 1960s boom in German film adaptations of his father's novels. Sometimes Bryan's films are mistaken for Edgar Wallace adaptations, since they are so similar in plot and style. In 1963, he appeared in a 50-minute German documentary about his father called The Edgar Wallace Story.

He died in 1971, at age 67.

== Bryan Edgar Wallace's filmography ==
=== 1930s ===
- The Squeaker (1930) Bryan only worked on the editing with this film based on his father's novel
- Bachelor's Folly (1931) Bryan only worked on the editing with this film
- The Frightened Lady (1932) released in U.S. as Criminal At Large; Bryan wrote the screenplay based on his father's novel
- The Flying Squad (1932) Bryan wrote the screenplay based on his father's novel
- White Face, the Fiend (1932) Bryan wrote the screenplay based on his father's play
- My Old Dutch (1934) Bryan co-wrote the screenplay based on the Arthur Shirley play
- The Clairvoyant (1935) released in U.S. as The Evil Mind; Bryan co-wrote the screenplay based on Ernst Lothar's novel The Clairvoyant
- Strangers on a Honeymoon (1936) Bryan co-wrote this screenplay based on his father's novel
- The Squeaker (1937) released in U.S. as Murder on Diamond Row; Bryan co-wrote the screenplay based on his father's novel
- You're in the Army Now (1937) Bryan co-wrote this screenplay with three other writers
- Inspector Hornleigh (1939) Bryan co-wrote this screenplay with two other writers, based on a BBC radio series
- The Mysterious Mr. Reeder (1939) Bryan co-wrote this screenplay based on his father's novel, The Mind of Mr. Reeder

=== 1960s ===
- The Secret of the Black Trunk (Das Geheimnis der schwarzen Koffer) (1961) made in Germany, based on Bryan Edgar Wallace's novel, Death Packs a Suitcase
- The Strangler of Blackmoor Castle (Der Würger von Schloss Blackmoor) (1963) made in Germany; based on the Bryan Edgar Wallace novel Strangler of Blackmoor Castle.
- The Hangman of London (Der Henker von London) (1963) made in Germany; based on Bryan Edgar Wallace's novel The White Carpet
- Scotland Yard vs Dr. Mabuse (Scotland Yard jagt Dr. Mabuse) (1963) made in Germany; based on Bryan Edgar Wallace's 1962 sci-fi novel The Device
- The Phantom of Soho (Das Phantom von Soho) (1964) made in Germany; based on an unpublished Bryan Edgar Wallace novel Murder by Proxy
- The Monster of London City (Das Ungeheuer von London City) (1964) made in Germany; Wallace just revised this screenplay (not based on one of his novels)
- The Seventh Victim (Das siebente Opfer) (1964) made in Germany; released in U.S. as The Racetrack Murders; based on the Bryan Edgar Wallace novel Murder is Not Enough
- The Deadly Avenger of Soho (Der Todesrächer von Soho / El muerto hace las maletas) (1971) a Spanish/German film directed by Jesus Franco, based on Bryan Edgar Wallace's novel Death Packs a Suitcase
- The Dead Are Alive (Das Geheimnis des gelben Grabes / Secret of the Yellow Graves) (1972) an Italian/German co-production directed by Armando Crispino; (Italian: L'etrusco uccide ancora / The Etruscan Kills Again) based on a short story by Bryan Edgar Wallace. This film was released posthumously in 1972.
- Bryan Edgar Wallace reputedly contributed with other writers to the screenplay for Dario Argento's The Bird with the Crystal Plumage (1969) and The Cat o' Nine Tails (1971). Although highly disputed amongst film historians, the movies were marketed as "Bryan Edgar Wallace" -Krimis in Germany and other markets. The official production documents show his signature amongst others on the screenplays.

== Bibliography ==
- Bergfelder, Tim. International Adventures: German Popular Cinema and European Co-Productions in the 1960s. Berghahn Books, 2005.
- Clark, Neil. Stranger than Fiction: The Life of Edgar Wallace, the Man Who Created King Kong. Stroud, UK: The History Press, 2015.
