= Before Sundown =

1956 film

- Film poster
- Directed by: Gottfried Reinhardt
- Written by: Gerhart Hauptmann (play); Jochen Huth
- Produced by: Artur Brauner
- Starring: Hans Albers; Annemarie Düringer; Martin Held
- Cinematography: Kurt Hasse
- Edited by: Kurt Zeunert
- Music by: Werner Eisbrenner
- Production company: CCC Film
- Distributed by: Schorcht Filmverleih; Sascha Film (Austria)
- Release date: 6 July 1956
- Running time: 103 minutes
- Country: West Germany
- Language: German

Before Sundown (German: Vor Sonnenuntergang) is a 1956 West German drama film directed by Gottfried Reinhardt and starring Hans Albers, Annemarie Düringer and Martin Held. At the 6th Berlin International Film Festival, it won the Golden Bear (Audience award). The film was adapted from the play Before Sunset by Gerhart Hauptmann.

The film was shot at the Spandau Studios in Berlin and on location in Vienna and the Swiss resort town of St. Moritz. The sets were designed by art directors Peter Röhrig and Rolf Zehetbauer.

== Cast ==
- Hans Albers as Generaldirektor Mathias Clausen
- Annemarie Düringer as Inken Peters
- Martin Held as Erich Klamroth
- Claus Biederstaedt as Egbert Clausen
- Hannelore Schroth as Ottilie Klamroth, geb. Clausen
- Erich Schellow as Wolfgang Clausen
- Maria Becker as Bettina Clausen
- Johanna Hofer as Frau Peters, Inkens Mutter
- Inge Langen as Paula Clausen, geb. Rübsamen
- Hans Nielsen as Dr. Steynitz, Sanitätsrat
- Reginald Pasch as Diener
- Wolfgang Preiss as Dr. Hahnefeld, Syndikus der Clausen-Werke
- Kurt Vespermann as Wuttke, Fahrer bei Clausen
- Franz Weber as Gärtner

== Bibliography ==
- Goble, Alan. The Complete Index to Literary Sources in Film. Walter de Gruyter, 1999.
