= The Deadly Avenger of Soho =

1972 film

- Directed by: Jesús Franco
- Written by: Artur Brauner; Jesús Franco
- Based on: The Corpse Packs His Bags by Bryan Edgar Wallace
- Produced by: Artur Brauner; Arturo Marcos
- Starring: Horst Tappert; Fred Williams; Barbara Rütting
- Cinematography: Manuel Merino
- Edited by: Renate Engelmann; María Luisa Soriano
- Music by: Rolf Kühn
- Production companies: CCC Film; Fénix Cooperativa Cinematográfica
- Distributed by: Constantin Film
- Release date: 9 November 1972
- Running time: 81 minutes
- Countries: Spain; West Germany
- Language: German

The Deadly Avenger of Soho (German: Der Todesrächer von Soho) is a 1972 Spanish-West German mystery crime thriller film directed by Jesús Franco and starring Horst Tappert, Fred Williams and Barbara Rütting. The film's sets were designed by the art director Hans Jürgen Kiebach. Based on a novel by Bryan Edgar Wallace, it was in the tradition of the German series of Krimi, based on the works of his father Edgar Wallace, while also reflecting the popularity of Giallo. The film was shot in the spring of 1971 with location shooting in Alicante, Barcelona and London. It premiered at the Sitges Film Festival.

== Synopsis ==
A series of murders have been taking place in London hotels, in which the killer first packs the luggage of the victim before murdering them. Inspector Redford of Scotland Yard is assigned to the case and enlists the assistance of his friend the crime novelist Charles Barton. Their investigations take them to a strange institution run by Doctor Bladmore and his assistant Helen.

== Cast ==
- Horst Tappert as Charles Barton
- Fred Williams as Inspector Ruppert Redford
- Barbara Rütting as Celia
- Elisa Montés as Helen Bennett
- Luis Morris as Andy Pickwick
- Siegfried Schürenberg as Dr. Bladmore
- Mara Laso as Lizi
- Eva Garden as Linda
- Rainer Basedow as McDowell
- Ángel Menéndez as Scotland Yard Chef
- Wolfgang Kieling as Ferencz
- Dan van Husen as Kronstel
- Guillermo Méndez as Wood
- Jesús Franco as Gonzales
- Andrea Montchal as Patakes
- Beni Cardoso as Diana

== Bibliography ==
- Bergfelder, Tim. International Adventures: German Popular Cinema and European Co-Productions in the 1960s. Berghahn Books, 2005.
- Edwards, Matthew & Berns, Fernando Gabriel Pagnoni (ed.) Bloodstained Narratives: The Giallo Film in Italy and Abroad. University Press of Mississippi, 2023.
- Kramp, Joachim· Hallo! Hier spricht Edgar Wallace: die Geschichte der deutschen Kriminalfilmserie 1959–1972. Schwarzkopf & Schwarzkopf, 2001.
