= Scotland Yard Hunts Dr. Mabuse =

1963 film

- Film poster
- Directed by: Paul May
- Screenplay by: Ladislas Fodor
- Based on: A story by Bryan Edgar Wallace
- Produced by: Artur Brauner
- Starring: Peter van Eyck; Sabine Bethmann; Dieter Borsche; Klaus Kinski; Wolfgang Preiss
- Cinematography: Nenad Jovicić
- Edited by: Walter Wischniewsky
- Music by: Rolf A. Wilhelm
- Production company: CCC Film
- Distributed by: Gloria Film
- Release date: 20 September 1963 (West Germany)
- Running time: 90 minutes
- Country: West Germany

Scotland Yard Hunts Dr. Mabuse or Scotland Yard vs. Dr Mabuse (German: Scotland Yard jagt Dr. Mabuse) is a 1963 German crime film directed by Paul May and starring Peter van Eyck. Scotland Yard vs. Dr. Mabuse was distributed in West Germany by Gloria Film, premiering on 20 September 1963. The film was written by Ladislas Fodor, based on a story idea written by Bryan Edgar Wallace. It was shot at the Spandau Studios in Berlin. The film's sets were designed by the art directors Albrecht Hennings and Hans Kuhnert.

== Cast ==
- Peter van Eyck as Major Bill Tern
- Sabine Bethmann as Nancy Masterson
- Dieter Borsche as George Cockstone
- Werner Peters as Inspektor Vulpius
- Klaus Kinski as Inspector Joe Wright
- Wolfgang Preiss as Dr. Mabuse's ghost
- Agnes Windeck as Gwendolyn Tern
- Ruth Wilbert as Prinzessin Diana
- Hans Nielsen as Chef von Scotland Yard
- Albrecht Schoenhals as Sir Robert General Allingham
- Wolfgang Lukschy as Ernest Hyliard
- Walter Rilla as Prof. Pohland alias "Dr. Mabuse"
- Ady Berber as Hangman
- Albert Bessler as Konservator
- Alfred Braun

== Bibliography ==
- Bergfelder, Tim (2005) [2004]. International Adventures: German Popular Cinema and European Co-Productions in the 1960s. New York: Berghahn Books. ISBN 978-1-57181-539-2.
- Haase, Holger: The Many Masks of Dr. Mabuse: Mabuse in the 1960s. (Kindle 2020)
- Kalat, David (2005). The Strange Case of Dr. Mabuse: A Study of the Twelve Films and Five Novels. Jefferson, NC: McFarland. ISBN 978-1-4766-0107-6.
- Rabkin, Leslie Y. (1998). The Celluloid Couch: An Annotated International Filmography of the Mental Health Professional in the Movies and Television, from the Beginning to 1990. Lanham, MD: Scarecrow Press. ISBN 978-0-8108-3462-0.
- Reimer, Robert C.; Reimer, Carol J. (2010). The A to Z of German Cinema. Lanham, MD: Scarecrow Press. ISBN 978-0-8108-7611-8.
