= Stanislav Ledinek =

German actor

- Born: 26 June 1920
- Died: 30 March 1969 (aged 48); Istanbul, Turkey
- Occupation: Actor
- Years active: 1953-1968

Stanislav Ledinek (26 June 1920 – 30 March 1969) was a German film actor. He appeared in more than 90 films between 1953 and 1968. He died in Istanbul, Turkey.

== Selected filmography ==
- Such a Charade (1953)
- Red Roses, Red Lips, Red Wine (1953)
- Life Begins at Seventeen (1953)
- Confession Under Four Eyes (1954)
- My Sister and I (1954)
- The Spanish Fly (1955)
- One Woman Is Not Enough? (1955)
- The Tour Guide of Lisbon (1956)
- The Girl from Flanders (1956)
- Victor and Victoria (1957)
- Stresemann (1957)
- It Happened Only Once (1958)
- The Girl with the Cat's Eyes (1958)
- Lilli (1958)
- Peter Voss, Hero of the Day (1959)
- The Blue Sea and You (1959)
- Nick Knatterton's Adventure (1959)
- A Thousand Stars Aglitter (1959)
- Every Day Isn't Sunday (1959)
- We Will Never Part (1960)
- Auf Wiedersehen (1961)
- Beloved Impostor (1961)
- The Last of Mrs. Cheyney (1961)
- The Gypsy Baron (1962)
- The Bandit and the Princess (1962)
- The Secret of the Black Trunk (1962)
- The Threepenny Opera (1963)
- Piccadilly Zero Hour 12 (1963)
- The Hangman of London (1963)
- The Squeaker (1963)
- The Inn on Dartmoor (1964)
- The Phantom of Soho (1964)
- DM-Killer (1965)
- Two Girls from the Red Star (1966)
- The Investigation (1966, TV film)
- Love Nights in the Taiga (1967)
- Der Tod läuft hinterher (1967, TV miniseries)
