= Hans Jürgen Kiebach =

German production designer (1930–1995)

- Born: 28 August 1930
- Died: 19 May 1995 (aged 64)
- Occupations: Production designer Art director Set decorator
- Years active: 1951-1987

Hans Jürgen Kiebach (28 August 1930 – 19 May 1995) was a German production designer, art director and set decorator. He won an Academy Award in the category Best Art Direction for the film Cabaret.

== Selected filmography ==
- Three Days of Fear (1952)
- We'll Talk About Love Later (1953)
- Diary of a Married Woman (1953)
- The Big Star Parade (1954)
- Love, Dance and a Thousand Songs (1955)
- Fruit in the Neighbour's Garden (1956)
- The Night of the Storm (1957)
- The Ideal Woman (1959)
- Brandenburg Division (1960)
- Grounds for Divorce (1960)
- Blind Justice (1961)
- The Return of Doctor Mabuse (1961)
- The Curse of the Yellow Snake (1963)
- The Hangman of London (1963)
- Love Has to Be Learned (1963)
- Breakfast in Bed (1963)
- The Phantom of Soho (1964)
- The Seventh Victim (1964)
- Wild Kurdistan (1965)
- Kingdom of the Silver Lion (1965)
- The Last Tomahawk (1965)
- The Defector (1966)
- The Peking Medallion (1967)
- Dead Run (1967)
- Hannibal Brooks (1969)
- De Sade (1969)
- Cabaret (1972)
- The Deadly Avenger of Soho (1972)
- The Dead Are Alive (1972)
- Night Flight from Moscow (1973)
- Coup de Grâce (1976)
- Grete Minde (1977)
- Winterspelt (1979)
- The Magician of Lublin (1979)
- S*H*E (1980)
- The Formula (1980)
- The Apple (1980)
- The Passerby (1982)
- Otto – Der Film (1985)
- Das Rätsel der Sandbank (1985, TV miniseries)

== See also ==
- List of German-speaking Academy Award winners and nominees
