= Robert A. Stemmle =

German screenwriter and film director (1903–1974)

- Born: 10 June 1903; Magdeburg, German Empire
- Died: 24 February 1974 (aged 70); Baden-Baden, West Germany
- Occupations: Screenwriter, film director
- Years active: 1932–1970

Robert Adolf Stemmle (10 June 1903 – 24 February 1974) was a German screenwriter and film director. He wrote for more than 80 films between 1932 and 1967. He also directed 46 films between 1934 and 1970. His 1959 film Die unvollkommene Ehe was entered into the 1st Moscow International Film Festival. He was born in Magdeburg, Germany, and died in Baden-Baden, West Germany.

== Selected filmography ==
- The Rebel, German-language version (dir. Luis Trenker, Curtis Bernhardt, 1932)
  - The Rebel, English-language version (dir. Luis Trenker, Curtis Bernhardt, Edwin H. Knopf, 1932)
- The Invisible Front (dir. Richard Eichberg, 1932)
- Ripening Youth (dir. Carl Froelich, 1933)
- Happy Days in Aranjuez, German-language version (dir. Johannes Meyer, 1933)
  - Goodbye, Beautiful Days, French-language version (dir. Johannes Meyer, André Beucler, 1933)
- Girls of Today (dir. Herbert Selpin, 1933)
- The Lucky Diamond, Italian-language version (dir. Carl Boese, 1933)
  - The Flower Girl from the Grand Hotel, German-language version (dir. Carl Boese, 1934)
- Mother and Child (dir. Hans Steinhoff, 1934)
- Such a Rascal (dir. R. A. Stemmle, 1934)
- Es tut sich was um Mitternacht (dir. R. A. Stemmle, 1934)
- Charley's Aunt (dir. R. A. Stemmle, 1934)
- Trouble with Jolanthe (dir. Carl Froelich, 1934)
- Heinz in the Moon (dir. R. A. Stemmle, 1934)
- Ein Kind, ein Hund, ein Vagabund (dir. Arthur Maria Rabenalt, 1934)
- Glückspilze (dir. R. A. Stemmle, 1935)
- Sergeant Schwenke (dir. Carl Froelich, 1935)
- I Was Jack Mortimer (dir. Carl Froelich, 1935)
- Victoria (dir. Carl Hoffmann, 1935)
- Carnival in Flanders, French-language version (dir. Jacques Feyder, 1935)
  - Die klugen Frauen, German-language version (dir. Jacques Feyder, 1936)
- The Dreamer (dir. Carl Froelich, 1936)
- The Abduction of the Sabine Women (dir. R. A. Stemmle, 1936)
- Desire (dir. Frank Borzage, 1936) — (remake of Happy Days in Aranjuez)
- Lucky Kids, German-language version (dir. Paul Martin, 1936)
  - Les Gais Lurons, French-language version (dir. Paul Martin, Jacques Natanson, 1936)
- Dangerous Crossing (dir. R. A. Stemmle, 1937)
- The Man Who Was Sherlock Holmes (dir. Karl Hartl, 1937)
- Daphne and the Diplomat (dir. R. A. Stemmle, 1937)
- The Mystery of Betty Bonn (dir. R. A. Stemmle, 1938)
- Kleiner Mann – ganz groß! (dir. R. A. Stemmle, 1938)
- By a Silken Thread (dir. R. A. Stemmle, 1938)
- Man for Man (dir. R. A. Stemmle, 1939)
- Donauschiffer (dir. R. A. Stemmle, 1940)
- Golowin geht durch die Stadt (dir. R. A. Stemmle, 1940)
- Jungens (dir. R. A. Stemmle, 1941)
- Quax the Crash Pilot (dir. Kurt Hoffmann, 1941)
- The Big Game (dir. R. A. Stemmle, 1942)
- Johann (dir. R. A. Stemmle, 1943)
- Herr Sanders lebt gefährlich (dir. R. A. Stemmle, 1944)
- Meine Herren Söhne (dir. R. A. Stemmle, 1945)
- The Millionaire (dir. R. A. Stemmle, 1947)
- Paths in Twilight (dir. Gustav Fröhlich, 1948)
- Blum Affair (dir. Erich Engel, 1948)
- The Berliner (dir. R. A. Stemmle, 1948)
- The Cuckoos (dir. Hans Deppe, 1949)
- The Beaver Coat (dir. Erich Engel, 1949)
- The Orplid Mystery (dir. Helmut Käutner, 1950)
- Abbiamo vinto! (dir. R. A. Stemmle, 1951)
- The Sinful Border (dir. R. A. Stemmle, 1951)
- Under the Thousand Lanterns (dir. Erich Engel, 1952)
- Toxi (dir. R. A. Stemmle, 1952)
- Homesick for You (dir. R. A. Stemmle, 1952)
- Southern Nights (dir. R. A. Stemmle, 1953)
- The Perfect Couple (dir. R. A. Stemmle, 1954)
- Das Licht der Liebe (dir. R. A. Stemmle, 1954)
- Emil and the Detectives (dir. R. A. Stemmle, 1954)
- A Heart Full of Music (dir. R. A. Stemmle, 1955)
- You Can No Longer Remain Silent (dir. R. A. Stemmle, 1955)
- Die Försterbuben (dir. R. A. Stemmle, 1955)
- Die ganze Welt singt nur Amore (dir. R. A. Stemmle, 1956)
- Uns gefällt die Welt (dir. R. A. Stemmle, 1956)
- … und die Liebe lacht dazu (dir. R. A. Stemmle, 1957)
- Es wird alles wieder gut (dir. Géza von Bolváry, 1957)
- Und abends in die Scala (dir. Erik Ode, 1958)
- Confess, Doctor Corda (dir. Josef von Báky, 1958)
- Majestät auf Abwegen (dir. R. A. Stemmle, 1958)
- Die unvollkommene Ehe (dir. R. A. Stemmle, 1959)
- Jons und Erdme (dir. Victor Vicas, 1959)
- The High Life (dir. Julien Duvivier, 1960)
- My Schoolfriend (dir. Robert Siodmak, 1960)
- The Last Witness (dir. Wolfgang Staudte, 1960)
- The Strange Countess (dir. Josef von Báky, 1961)
- Blum Affair (dir. R. A. Stemmle, 1962, TV film)
- Jeder stirbt für sich allein (dir. Falk Harnack, 1962, TV film)
- Das Testament des Dr. Mabuse (dir. Werner Klingler, 1962)
- Almost Angels (dir. Steve Previn, 1962)
- Der Fall Rohrbach (dir. R. A. Stemmle, 1963, TV miniseries)
- The Hangman of London (1963) (dir. Edwin Zbonek, 1963)
- The Curse of the Hidden Vault (dir. Franz Josef Gottlieb, 1964)
- Old Shatterhand (dir. Hugo Fregonese, 1964)
- The Monster of London City (dir. Edwin Zbonek, 1964)
- Der Fall Jakubowski – Rekonstruktion eines Justizirrtums (dir. R. A. Stemmle, 1964, TV film)
- The Treasure of the Aztecs (dir. Robert Siodmak, 1965)
- The Pyramid of the Sun God (dir. Robert Siodmak, 1965)
- Kubinke (dir. R. A. Stemmle, 1966, TV film)
- Der Fall Kaspar Hauser (dir. R. A. Stemmle, 1966, TV miniseries)
- Rasputin (dir. R. A. Stemmle, 1966, TV film)
- Der Zündholzkönig – Der Fall Ivar Kreuger (dir. R. A. Stemmle, 1967, TV film)
- Der rasende Reporter – Egon Erwin Kisch (dir. R. A. Stemmle, 1967, TV film)
- Anastasia (dir. R. A. Stemmle, 1967, TV film)
- Postlagernd Opernball – Die Affäre Redl (dir. R. A. Stemmle, 1967, TV film)
- Frühling in Baden-Baden (dir. R. A. Stemmle, 1967, TV film)
- Anna Böckler (dir. R. A. Stemmle, 1968, TV film)
- Neu-Böseckendorf (dir. R. A. Stemmle, 1969, TV film)
- Recht oder Unrecht (1970–1971, TV series)
- Brautwerbung (dir. R. A. Stemmle, 1971, TV film)
- Unter Ausschluß der Öffentlichkeit (1974, TV series)

== Publications ==
As author

- Affäre Blum. Herbig, München 1979, ISBN 3-7766-0968-0.
- Aus heiterm Himmel. Theater- und Filmanektoden. Herbig, Berlin 1942.
- Herzeleid auf Leinewand. 7 Moritaten. Bruckmann, München 1962.
- Hier hat der Spass ein Ende. Verlag der Sternbücher, Hamburg 1957.
- Ich war ein kleiner PG. Ein Roman. Goverts, Stuttgart 1958.
- Ja, ja, ja, ach ja, s'ist traurig, aber wahr. Ergreifende Balladen und tragische Moritaten. Verlag Weiß, Berlin 1964.
- Der Mann, der Sherlock Holmes war. Ein heiterer Kriminalroman. Eulenspiegel-Verlag, Berlin 1996, ISBN 3-359-00856-1.
- Onkel Jodokus und seine Erben. Ein heiterer Roman. Herbig, Berlin 1953.
- Reise ohne Wiederkehr. Der Fall Petiot. Verlag das neue Berlin, Berlin 1968.
- Die Geburt der Komödie. 7 Bilder nach Franz Pocci. Deutscher Laienspiel-Verlag, Rotenburg/Fulda 1950.

As editor

- Marta Adler: Mein Schicksal waren die Zigeuner. Schünemann, Bremen 1957.
- Paul Johann Anselm von Feuerbach: Merkwürdige Verbrechen in aktenmässiger Darstellung. Bruckmann, München 1963.
- Herrmann Mostar: Der neue Pitaval. Sammlung berühmter und merkwürdiger Kriminalfälle. 15 vols. Desch, München 1963-69
