= Albert Bessler =

German actor (1905–1975)

- Born: 15 February 1905; Hamburg, German Empire
- Died: 4 December 1975 (aged 70); West Berlin, West Germany
- Occupation: Actor
- Years active: 1942–1975

Albert Bessler (15 February 1905 – 4 December 1975) was a German film actor. He appeared in 40 films between 1942 and 1975. He was born in Hamburg, Germany and died in West Berlin, West Germany.

== Partial filmography ==
- Front Theatre (1942) - Ein Offizier (uncredited)
- Berliner Ballade (1948) - (uncredited)
- The Blue Swords (1949) - Finanzminister
- The Perfect Couple (1954)
- Confess, Doctor Corda (1958) - Dr. Dollheubel
- Restless Night (1958)
- Majestät auf Abwegen (1958) - Filmdirektor
- Aus dem Tagebuch eines Frauenarztes (1959) - Landgerichtsdirektor
- Menschen im Hotel (1959) - Dr. Altendorfer (uncredited)
- The Death Ship (1959) - US-Konsul
- The High Life (1960) - Monsieur Onyx
- Sweetheart of the Gods (1960) - Ministerialrat
- The Avenger (1960) - Zeitungsmann
- Brainwashed (1960) - Scientist
- The Thousand Eyes of Dr. Mabuse (1960) - Hotel-Ingenieur
- Carnival Confession (1960) - Dr. Classen
- The Young Sinner (1960) - Scharwitz
- The Last Witness (1960) - Dr. Hollberg
- Blind Justice (1961) - Empfangschef
- The Return of Dr. Mabuse (1961) - Trödler
- The Strange Countess (1961) - Gefängnisdirektor Duffon (uncredited)
- Ich kann nicht länger schweigen (1962) - Sachverständiger
- Aurora Marriage Bureau (1962) - Charles, Diener
- The Secret of the Black Trunk (1962) - Harris (uncredited)
- The Testament of Dr. Mabuse (1962) - Joe - Paragraphen
- The Squeaker (1963) - Butler James
- The Strangler of Blackmoor Castle (1963) - Sebastian - the Gardener
- Scotland Yard Hunts Dr. Mabuse (1963) - Konservator
- The Hangman of London (1963) - Francois Bréant
- Piccadilly Zero Hour 12 (1963) - Skinny
- Frozen Alive (1964) - Martin, lab tech.
- Neues vom Hexer (1965) - Vorsitzender bei Gericht (uncredited)
- Sunscorched (1965) - Reverendo Dean
- Melissa (1966, TV Mini-Series) - Dr. Swanson
- Long Legs, Long Fingers (1966) - Richter
- The Hunchback of Soho (1966) - Butler Anthony
- Creature with the Blue Hand (1967) - Butler Anthony
- Death and Diamonds (1968) - Butler
- The Martyr (1974) - Stanislav
- Derrick (1975, Episode 10: "Kamillas junger Freund") - Marczek
