= Die unvollkommene Ehe =

1959 film directed by Robert A. Stemmle

- Directed by: Robert A. Stemmle
- Written by: Juliane Kay; Robert A. Stemmle
- Produced by: Otto Dürer; Paula Wessely
- Starring: Paula Wessely
- Cinematography: Friedl Behn-Grund
- Release date: 5 August 1959 (Moscow)
- Running time: 91 minutes
- Country: Austria
- Language: German

Die unvollkommene Ehe is a 1959 Austrian comedy film directed by Robert A. Stemmle. It was entered into the 1st Moscow International Film Festival.

== Cast ==
- Paula Wessely as Frau Dr. Winifred Lert
- Johanna Matz as Susi - ihre Tochter
- Johannes Heesters as Professor Paul Lert
- Dietmar Schönherr as Rolf Beckmayer - Schriftsteller
- Fritz Schulz as Ernst Fiala - Bürovorsteher
- Gudrun Schmidt as Yelli Ball - Schauspielerin
- Friedl Czepa as Hanni - Wirtschafterin
- Karl Hackenberg as Max Schnack - Textdichter
- Raoul Retzer as Karl Linnegger - Straßenbahnschaffner
