= Hans Reiser (actor) =

German actor (1919–1992)

- Born: 3 June 1919; Munich, Bavaria, Germany
- Died: 14 June 1992 (aged 73); Munich, Bavaria, Germany
- Resting place: Westfriedhof München
- Occupation: Actor
- Years active: 1939–1991 (film & TV)

Hans Reiser (3 June 1919 – 10 June 1992) was a German film and television actor. He starred as Joseph Schmidt in the 1958 biopic A Song Goes Round the World, and The Great Escape (film) as Herr Kuhn. Reiser was born and died in Munich.

== Filmography ==
| Year | Title | Role | Notes |
|---|---|---|---|
| 1949 | Encounter with Werther | | |
| 1950 | Beloved Liar | Erich | |
| 1951 | Immortal Light | Marcel | |
| 1951 | A Heidelberg Romance | Erwin Turner | |
| 1952 | Nights on the Road | Franz | |
| 1952 | Die schöne Tölzerin | Claudius | |
| 1952 | Monks, Girls and Hungarian Soldiers | Johannes, Laienbruder-Novize | |
| 1952 | Oh, You Dear Fridolin | Fridolin, ein junger Dichter | |
| 1953 | Music by Night | Teddy Taylor | |
| 1953 | The Bogeyman | Conny Cooper | |
| 1953 | Street Serenade | Luigi | |
| 1954 | The Perfect Couple | Harald Wandel, Gebrauchtwagenhändler | |
| 1955 | The Priest from Kirchfeld | Friedrich Ademeit, Pianist | |
| 1955 | One Woman Is Not Enough? | Dr. Stefan Mertens | |
| 1956 | Hilfe - sie liebt mich | Meyer, Angestellter bei "Tourist" | |
| 1957 | Sand, Love and Salt | Nico | |
| 1957 | Immer wenn der Tag beginnt | Dr. Walter Lohmann | |
| 1957 | Heute blau und morgen blau | Assessor Werner Ott | |
| 1958 | A Song Goes Round the World | Joseph Schmidt | |
| 1960 | Der Schleier fiel | Kaplan Rieder | |
| 1960 | Headquarters State Secret | Werner Malden | |
| 1960 | Final Accord | Vladya Dupont | |
| 1962 | The Secret of the Black Trunk | Humphrey Curtis, Schriftsteller | |
| 1963 | Bekenntnisse eines möblierten Herrn | Pauli | |
| 1963 | The Threepenny Opera | A Guide | |
| 1963 | The Great Escape | Herr Kuhn | |
| 1963 | The Strangler of Blackmoor Castle | Mike Pierce | |
| 1964 | Time of the Innocent | Doctor | |
| 1966 | Die Gentlemen bitten zur Kasse | Thomas Webster | 3 episodes |
| 1966 | The Strangler of the Tower | Inspektor Harvey | |
| 1966 | I Deal in Danger | Richter | |
| 1968 | Peter und Sabine | Dr. Wollfen | |
| 1978 | The Unicorn | Physician | |

== Bibliography ==
- Cowie, Peter. World Filmography 1968. Tantivy Press, 1968.
