= Werner Peters =

German actor (1918–1971)

- Born: 7 July 1918; Werlitzsch, Kreis Delitzsch, Prussian Saxony, German Empire
- Died: 30 March 1971 (aged 52); Wiesbaden, West Germany
- Occupation: Actor
- Years active: 1947–1971
- Spouse(s): Ursula Burow (1966–30 March 1971), 1 child (son)

Werner Peters (7 July 1918 – 30 March 1971) was a German film actor. He appeared in 102 films between 1947 and 1971.

== Biography ==
Peters was born in Werlitzsch, Kreis Delitzsch, Prussian Saxony.

His film career started with the lead in Wolfgang Staudte's Der Untertan, produced in the young German Democratic Republic. Peters then worked in West Germany, appearing mostly in supporting roles in popular movies. He also established himself in the European and international film industry by frequently playing sinister German or Nazi characters.

Peters appeared in two episodes of the 1966 American television espionage drama Blue Light. These were edited together with two other episodes to create the theatrical film I Deal in Danger, released in December 1966, which included his role.

He died of a heart attack on a promotion tour for his latest film in Wiesbaden, Germany.

== Selected filmography ==
- The Beaver Coat (1949), as Eberhard Schulz
- Der Kahn der fröhlichen Leute (1950), as Hugo
- Der Untertan (1951), as Diederich Hessling
- Anna Susanna (1953), as Kuddel
- Ernst Thälmann (1954), as Gottlieb Quadde
- Before God and Man (1955), as Anton Mechala
- The Devil Strikes at Night (1957), as Willi Keun
- The Heart of St. Pauli (1957), as Tanne
- Escape from Sahara (1958), as Brouillard
- Besuch aus der Zone (1958, TV film), as Kleinschmidt
- The Copper (1958), as Mücke
- Rosemary (1958), as Franz Josef Nagonski
- Grabenplatz 17 (1958), as Eugen Machon
- Lilli (1958), Referent Kinker
- Restless Night (1958), as Maj. Kartuschke
- Thirteen Old Donkeys (1958), as Oberlehrer Kasten
- Court Martial (1959), as Kriegsgerichtsrat Brenner
- The Black Chapel (1959), as Heinrich Himmler
- Der Schatz vom Toplitzsee (1959), as Alfred Kopetzsky
- Strafbataillon 999 (1960), as Hauptfeldwebel Krüll
- The Cat Shows Her Claws (1960), as German General
- Roses for the Prosecutor (1960), as Otto Kugler
- The Thousand Eyes of Dr. Mabuse (1960), as Hieronymus B. Mistelzweig
- Auf Wiedersehen (1961), as Paul Blümel
- The Return of Doctor Mabuse (1961), as Böhmler
- Blind Justice (1961), as François Lacroix
- It Can't Always Be Caviar (1961), as Zumbusch
- The Invisible Dr. Mabuse (1962), as Martin Droste / Bobo the Clown
- The Counterfeit Traitor (1962), as Bruno Ulrich
- The Door with Seven Locks (1962), as Bertram Cody
- Jeder stirbt für sich allein (1962, TV film), as Kriminalkommissar Escherich
- The Endless Night (1963), as Herbert
- The Black Abbot (1963), as Fabian Gilder
- Scotland Yard Hunts Dr. Mabuse (1963), as Inspektor Vulpius
- The Lightship (1963), as Trittel
- The White Spider (1963), as Sergeant Meals
- The Secret of the Black Widow (1963), as Mr. Shor
- The Curse of the Yellow Snake (1963), as Stephan Narth
- The Curse of the Hidden Vault (1964), as Spedding
- The Seventh Victim (1964), as Mysterious man
- Dog Eat Dog (1964), as Jannis, the butler
- The Phantom of Soho (1964), as Dr. Dalmer
- Three for a Robbery (1964), as Peter Weimer
- 36 Hours (1965), as SS-Standartenführer Otto Schack
- Black Eagle of Santa Fe (1965), as Morton
- Wild Kurdistan (1965), as Mütesselin
- Battle of the Bulge (1965), as Gen. Kohler
- Witness Out of Hell (1966), as von Walden
- A Fine Madness (1966), as Dr. Vorbeck
- I Deal in Danger (1966), as Gestapo Captain Elm
- The Peking Medallion (1967), as Inspector Pinto
- Dead Run (1967), as Bardieff
- Lotus Flowers for Miss Quon (1967), as Charlie Lee
- Assignment K (1968), as Kramer
- The Secret War of Harry Frigg (1968), as Maj. von Steignitz
- Istanbul Express (1968), as Dr. Lenz
- The Killer Likes Candy (1968), as Guardino
- Death Knocks Twice (1969), as Charly Hollmann
- The Bird with the Crystal Plumage (1970), as Antique Dealer
- Under the Roofs of St. Pauli (1970), as Hausach, "King of St. Pauli"
- Perrak (1970), as Heinz-Fritz Bottke
- The Body in the Thames (1971), as William Baxter
