= A Love in Germany =

- German theatrical release poster
- Directed by: Andrzej Wajda
- Written by: Rolf Hochhuth; Agnieszka Holland
- Based on: A Love in Germany by Rolf Hochhuth
- Produced by: Artur Brauner; ZDF
- Starring: Hanna Schygulla; Piotr Łysak; Armin Mueller-Stahl; Ralf Wolter
- Cinematography: Igor Luther
- Edited by: Halina Prugar-Ketling
- Music by: Michel Legrand
- Distributed by: Scotia; Triumph Films
- Release date: 27 October 1983 (West Germany)
- Running time: 132 minutes
- Countries: West Germany; France
- Languages: German; Polish

Eine Liebe in Deutschland (A Love in Germany) is a 1983 feature film directed by Andrzej Wajda.

The film is based on the novel by Rolf Hochhuth about a woman who commits adultery with a prisoner of war while her husband serves as a soldier during World War II. A Love in Germany, featuring many popular German actors, was produced by German film producer Artur Brauner and German broadcaster ZDF.

== Synopsis ==
The story takes place in the German village of Brombach, at the border to Switzerland. A man and his son visit the village to find out about an incident in the life of the man's mother, Pauline Kropp, in 1941 in this village. However, they are met with mistrust by the local population.

In 1941, the owner of the local fruit-and-vegetables shop has been called up. His shop has a key function for the town's supply situation. His customers know from World War I how rationing can make the owner of such a shop very rich if only he's egoistic enough to get corrupted by well-heeled customers who don't care whether their poorer country fellowmen's families starve. So when his wife Pauline starts to run the shop alone, her character is subsequently of public interest for all citizens who are concerned about the well-being of their families during the ongoing war. Pauline, still young and attractive, shares the fate of other soldiers' wives who constantly face the fear her husband might return crippled, maimed or not at all.

But because her husband's shop is highly important for the town's community, she gets somebody who can ease her working load, and so a Polish prisoner of war named Stanisław must serve her. She obviously finds him handsome and relishes that he has to obey all her commands. Eventually she seduces him; the unlikely couple sometimes celebrate their love even literally in the open. Even when a town's official informs her that her evident bliss leads other women to doubt her integrity she still doesn't let go of her love affair. The town official keeps on warning her that under the prevailing Nazi laws her adultery is punishable as "Rassenschande". Pauline keeps on putting the Polish POW in lethal danger until he is finally taken to court and sentenced to death. Pauline is imprisoned for two years.

Her son and her grandson are appalled when they realise that the official, who initially had warned Pauline but in the end had abandoned her, still lives in this very village.

== Background ==
The film was shot in the villages of Efringen, Eimeldingen and Tumringen. Some scenes were shot at the Spandau Studios in West Berlin. The production set was designed by Allan Starski and Götz Heymann, costumes were designed by Krystyna Zachwatowicz and Ingrid Zoré.

== Reception ==
The film was not received too well by the German public, Der Spiegel, 45/1983 calling it a "cinema mishap", the Lexikon des Internationalen Films calling it "full of clichés". Andrzej Wajda later reflected on the circumstances of making the film:

Unfortunately, the story barely indicated the plot and described it generally and briefly, using only selected details. I, meanwhile, was unable to reconstruct real life in a small German town during the war. I didn't know the realities, and had to resort to fiction.The German audience sensed this unreality at once, which afforded them the opportunity to reject, with relief, the problems touched upon in the film.

On Rotten Tomatoes, A Love in Germany holds a rating of 55% based on 22 reviews. The consensus states: "Hanna Schygulla's thoroughly compelling performance isn't quite enough to outweigh A Love in Germany's leaden execution -- but it comes close."

== Accolades ==
The film was nominated for Best Foreign Language Film of 1984 by the U.S. National Board of Review of Motion Pictures.
