= Rudolf Fernau =

German actor (1898–1985)

- Born: 7 January 1898; Munich, German Empire
- Died: 4 November 1985 (aged 87); Munich, West Germany
- Occupation: Actor
- Years active: 1936–1982

Rudolf Fernau (7 January 1898 – 4 November 1985) was a German actor who appeared in 53 films between 1936 and 1982.

== Biography ==
Fernau was born and died in Munich, Germany.

A Nazi Party member, he was sentenced to nine months in prison and a lifelong ban from working by a denazification tribunal after the World War II, but his sentence was reduced to a small fine on appeal.

== Selected filmography ==
- The Traitor (1936) - Fritz Brockau
- In the Name of the People (1939) - Alfred Hübner
- The Curtain Falls (1939) - Rodegger
- Brand im Ozean (1939) - Pedro de Alvarado
- Der Weg zu Isabel (1940) - Vicomte Victor
- Counterfeiters (1940) - Gaston de Frossard, Kopf der Fälscherbande
- Goodbye, Franziska (1941) - Dr. Christoph Leitner
- Comrades (1941) - Graf Kerski
- Giungla (1942) - Il dottor Jack Bennett
- Vom Schicksal verweht (1942) - Dr. Jack Bennett
- Doctor Crippen (1942) - Dr. Crippen
- Der Verteidiger hat das Wort (1944) - Günther Fabian
- The Roedern Affair (1944) - Graf Wengen
- The Silent Guest (1945) - Oskar Kampmann
- Night of the Twelve (1949) - Rohrbach, Kriminalrat
- The Murder Trial of Doctor Jordan (1949) - Tropenarzt Dr. Jordan
- Friday the Thirteenth (1949) - Robert - Diener
- Maria Theresa (1951) - Graf Kaunitz
- Monks, Girls and Hungarian Soldiers (1952) - Megerle, kurfürstlicher Geheimsekretarius
- The Sergeant's Daughter (1952) - Baron Hügener, Rittergutsbesitzer
- Captain Bay-Bay (1953) - Dr. Mendez
- Königliche Hoheit (1953) - Großherzog Albrecht
- The Witch (1954)
- Marriage Impostor (1954) - Adrian van Zanten
- Walking Back into the Past (1954) - Stefan Berg
- Ludwig II (1955) - Prinz Luitpold von Bayern
- Children, Mother, and the General (1955) - Stabsarzt
- Sergeant Borck (1955) - Großhändler Willy Staade
- San Salvatore (1956) - Dr. Stormer, Oberarzt
- Skandal um Dr. Vlimmen (1956)
- The Story of Anastasia (1956) - Russischer Emigrantenführer Serge Botkin
- Confess, Doctor Corda (1958) - Chefarzt Professor Schliessmann
- Im Namen einer Mutter (1961) - Staatsanwalt
- Blind Justice (1961) - Generaldirektor Delgasso
- The Return of Doctor Mabuse (1961) - Pfarrer Briefenstein
- The Strange Countess (1961) - Dr. Tappatt
- The Invisible Dr. Mabuse (1962) - Professor Erasmus
- The Strangler of Blackmoor Castle (1963) - Lucius Clark
- The Hangman of London (1963) - Jerome
- Piccadilly Zero Hour 12 (1963) - Inspector Jim Craddock
- The Foundling (1967, TV Movie) - Antonio Piachi
- Dead Body on Broadway (1969) - Nasen-Charly
- Karl May (1974) - Bredereck
- To the Bitter End (1975) - Schauberg
- Everyone Dies Alone (1976) - Kammergerichtsrat Fromm
- Romeo und Julia (1976, TV Movie)
- The Elixirs of the Devil (1976) - Prior Leonardus
- Die Fastnachtsbeichte (1976, TV Movie) - Henrici
- Derrick (1977–1981, TV Series) - Herr Godell / Alfred Engel
- Seehundskomödie (1978, TV Movie)
- Goldene Zeiten (1981, TV Series) - Vater Bombach
- Qualverwandtschaften (1982, TV Movie)
