= Alice Treff =

German actress

- Born: 4 June 1906; Berlin, Germany
- Died: 8 February 2003 (aged 96); Berlin, Germany
- Occupation: Actress
- Years active: 1932–2001

Alice Martha Treff (4 June 1906 – 8 February 2003) was a German film actress. She appeared in more than 120 films between 1932 and 2001. She was born and died in Berlin, Germany.

== Selected filmography ==
- Peter Voss, Thief of Millions (1932)
- Melody of Love (1932)
- Young Dessau's Great Love (1933)
- The Green Domino (1935)
- The Girl Irene (1936)
- The Irresistible Man (1937)
- The Night of Decision (1938)
- Mistake of the Heart (1939)
- The Sensational Casilla Trial (1939)
- Wedding in Barenhof (1942)
- Two in a Big City (1942)
- Front Theatre (1942)
- The Endless Road (1943)
- Circus Renz (1943)
- In Those Days (1947)
- Ghost in the Castle (1947)
- Street Acquaintances (1948)
- Dangerous Guests (1949)
- Girls Behind Bars (1949)
- Night of the Twelve (1949)
- Der Auftrag Höglers (1950)
- My Niece Susanne (1950)
- The Sinful Border (1951)
- That Can Happen to Anyone (1952)
- The Flower of Hawaii (1953)
- Canaris (1954)
- The Silent Angel (1954)
- Ball of Nations (1954)
- The Faithful Hussar (1954)
- Ingrid – Die Geschichte eines Fotomodells (1955)
- The Ambassador's Wife (1955)
- Children, Mother, and the General (1955)
- One Woman Is Not Enough? (1955)
- Kitty and the Great Big World (1956)
- The Tour Guide of Lisbon (1956)
- The Girl Without Pyjamas (1957)
- The Unexcused Hour (1957)
- Confessions of Felix Krull (1957)
- A Time to Love and a Time to Die (1958)
- The Csardas King (1958)
- The Girl from the Marsh Croft (1958)
- Crime After School (1959)
- The Woman by the Dark Window (1960)
- Grounds for Divorce (1960)
- You Must Be Blonde on Capri (1961)
- The Black Abbot (1963)
- Holiday in St. Tropez (1964)
- Condemned to Sin (1964)
- The Seventh Victim (1964)
- Don't Tell Me Any Stories (1964)
- Witness Out of Hell (1966)
- Rhinegold (1978)
- Doctor Faustus (1982)
- Derrick:
  - "Abendfrieden" (1978) as Margarete Schübel
  - "Eine Rechnung geht nicht auf" (1980) as Frau Riebeck
  - "Das Mädchen in Jeans" (1984) as Eliane von Haidersfeld
  - "Familie im Feuer" (1985) as Frau Weiler
  - "Mord inklusive" (1988) as Frau von Wedel
