= Man and Beast (1963 film) =

1963 film

- Directed by: Edwin Zbonek
- Written by: Sigmund Bendkover; Sveta Lukic
- Produced by: Artur Brauner
- Starring: Götz George
- Cinematography: Nenad Jovicic
- Edited by: Mirjana Mitic
- Release date: 29 June 1963
- Running time: 88 minutes
- Countries: West Germany; Yugoslavia
- Language: German

Man and Beast (German: Mensch und Bestie, Serbian: Čovek i zver) is a 1963 CCC Film West German-Yugoslavian war film directed by Edwin Zbonek. It was entered into the 13th Berlin International Film Festival.

== Cast ==
- Götz George as Franz Köhler, concentration camp prisoner
- Günther Ungeheuer as Hauptsturmfuhrer Willi Köhler, camp commandant and Franz's Brother
- Katinka Hoffmann as Vera
- Helmut Oeser as Deserter
- Herbert Kersten as Lederer
- Kurt Sobotka as SS-Man Kasche
- Alexander Allerson as SS-Man Goldap
- Petar Banićević as Stani
- Stanko Buhanac as Blanchi
- Nada Kasapić as Mother
- Marijan Lovrić as Rademacher
- Nikola Popović as Albert
