= Dieter Borsche =

German actor (1909–1982)

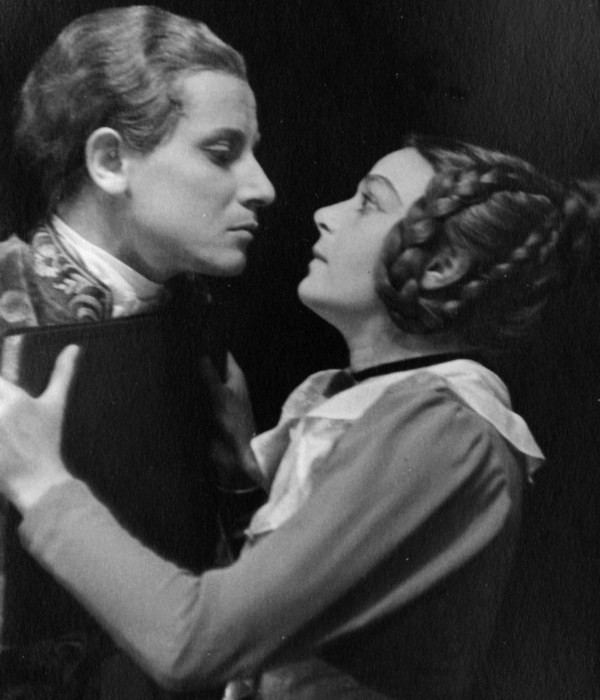
- Dieter Borsche and Lotte Berger in Die Mitschuldigen, 1937
- Born: 25 October 1909; Hanover, German Empire
- Died: 5 August 1982 (aged 72); Nuremberg, West Germany
- Occupation: Actor
- Years active: 1935–1981

Albert Eugen Rollomann (25 October 1909 – 5 August 1982), better known as Dieter Borsche, was a German actor. He appeared in more than 90 films between 1935 and 1981. Since 1944, he suffered from muscle atrophy and had to use a wheelchair since the late 1970s. He was born in Hanover, Germany and died in Nuremberg, Germany. Borsche became a film star in the post-World War II era, following his performance in Keepers of the Night (1949).

== Selected filmography ==
- All Because of the Dog (1935)
- A Prussian Love Story (1938)
- Keepers of the Night (1949)
- A Day Will Come (1950)
- The Falling Star (1950)
- Dr. Holl (1951)
- The Sinful Border (1951)
- Fanfares of Love (1951)
- No Greater Love (1952)
- Father Needs a Wife (1952)
- The Great Temptation (1952)
- Le Guérisseur (1953)
- Fanfare of Marriage (1953)
- The Chaplain of San Lorenzo (1953)
- His Royal Highness (His Royal Highness) (1953)
- Must We Get Divorced? (1953)
- Ali Baba and the Forty Thieves (1954)
- The Barrings (1955)
- I Was an Ugly Girl (1955)
- Stopover in Orly (1955)
- San Salvatore (1956)
- If We All Were Angels (1956)
- Queen Louise (1957)
- At the Green Cockatoo by Night (1957)
- A Time to Love and a Time to Die (1958)
- U 47 – Kapitänleutnant Prien (1958)
- Two Hearts in May (1958)
- I Learned That in Paris (1960)
- The Dead Eyes of London (1961)
- Das Halstuch (1962, TV miniseries)
- The Red Frenzy (1962)
- I Must Go to the City (1962)
- The Happy Years of the Thorwalds (1962)
- The Brain (1962)
- Fanfare of Marriage (1963)
- The Lightship (1963)
- The Hangman of London (1963)
- The Black Abbot (1963)
- Scotland Yard Hunts Dr. Mabuse (1963)
- The Shoot (1964)
- The Seventh Victim (1964)
- The Phantom of Soho (1964)
- The Swedish Girl (1965)
- Wild Kurdistan (1965)
- Kingdom of the Silver Lion (1965)
- The Doctor Speaks Out (1966)
- When Ludwig Goes on Manoeuvres (1967)
- The Doctor of St. Pauli (1968)
- The Priest of St. Pauli (1970)
- The Last Days of Gomorrah (1974, TV film)
- Der Strick um den Hals (1975, TV miniseries)
