= Walter Wischniewsky =

German film editor (1912–1995)

- Born: 16 September 1912; Spandau, Brandenburg; German Empire
- Died: 1 February 1995 (aged 82); Berlin, Germany
- Occupation: Editor
- Years active: 1936–1966

Walter Wischniewsky (16 September 1912 – 1 February 1995) was a German film editor who worked on over a hundred productions during his career. Wischniewsky also sometimes worked as an assistant director. Wischniewsky began his career during the Nazi era, but most productions he worked on were post-Second World War. He edited several rubble films, including The Berliner (1948). During the 1950s and 1960s he became one of the mainstays of German commercial cinema, working on the long-running Edgar Wallace and Karl May series. Wischniewsky edited Fritz Lang's Indian-shot The Indian Tomb and The Tiger of Eschnapur (both 1959).

== Selected filmography ==
- The Empress's Favourite (1936)
- Talking About Jacqueline (1937)
- The Holm Murder Case (1938)
- Between Hamburg and Haiti (1940)
- The Rothschilds (1940)
- Annelie (1941)
- 5 June (1942)
- Young Hearts (1944)
- Nora (1944)
- Das Mädchen Juanita (1945)
- King of Hearts (1947)
- Morituri (1948)
- The Berliner (1948)
- Anonymous Letters (1949)
- Martina (1949)
- Girls Behind Bars (1949)
- Nights on the Nile (1949)
- A Rare Lover (1950)
- Not Without Gisela (1951)
- The Sinful Border (1951)
- Cuba Cabana (1952)
- Holiday From Myself (1952)
- Homesick for You (1952)
- My Wife Is Being Stupid (1952)
- The Prince of Pappenheim (1952)
- Big City Secret (1952)
- Secretly Still and Quiet (1953)
- When the White Lilacs Bloom Again (1953)
- The Great Lola (1954)
- Clivia (1954)
- The Telephone Operator (1954)
- The Perfect Couple (1954)
- Ten on Every Finger (1954)
- Hotel Adlon (1955)
- Love, Dance and a Thousand Songs (1955)
- One Woman Is Not Enough? (1955)
- The Star of Rio (1955)
- The Bath in the Barn (1956)
- The Count of Luxemburg (1957)
- Different from You and Me (1957)
- Precocious Youth (1957)
- Confess, Doctor Corda (1958)
- Munchhausen in Africa (1958)
- Voyage to Italy, Complete with Love (1958)
- Marili (1959)
- The Tiger of Eschnapur (1959)
- The Indian Tomb (1959)
- And That on Monday Morning (1959)
- Sweetheart of the Gods (1960)
- The Thousand Eyes of Dr. Mabuse (1960)
- It Can't Always Be Caviar (1961)
- This Time It Must Be Caviar (1961)
- Via Mala (1961)
- Doctor Sibelius (1962)
- The Terror of Doctor Mabuse (1962)
- The Secret of the Black Trunk (1962)
- Breakfast in Bed (1963)
- Scotland Yard Hunts Dr. Mabuse (1963)
- The Curse of the Yellow Snake (1963)
- The Hangman of London (1963)
- Breakfast in Bed (1963)
- The Strangler of Blackmoor Castle (1963)
- Freddy in the Wild West (1964)
- The Phantom of Soho (1964)
- The Seventh Victim (1964)
- The Treasure of the Aztecs (1965)
- The Pyramid of the Sun God (1965)
- Wild Kurdistan (1965)
- Kingdom of the Silver Lion (1965)
- Who Killed Johnny R.? (1966)

== Bibliography ==
- Langford, Michelle (ed.) Directory of World Cinema: Germany. Intellect Books, 2012.
- Shandley, Robert. Rubble Films: German Cinema in the Shadow of the Third Reich. Temple University Press, 2010.
