= Babiy Yar (film) =

2003 film

- Directed by: Jeff Kanew
- Written by: Stephen Glantz
- Starring: Michael Degen, Katrin Sass, Barbara De Rossi, Axel Milberg, Euclid Kyurdzidis
- Music by: Walter Werzowa
- Release date: July 3, 2003
- Running time: 112 minutes
- Countries: United States; Belarus; Germany
- Languages: German, English subtitles

Babiy Yar (also known as Babij Jar) is a 2003 film directed by Jeff Kanew and starring Michael Degen.

Filmed in Europe and given a limited theatrical release, the film recounts the mass murders in September 1941 of thousands of Jews, Soviet POWs, communists, Romani people and civilian hostages by German Einsatzgruppen, and Ukrainian nationalist collaborators in the title location, a ravine in Kyiv (the capital of Ukraine).

== See also ==
- Babi Yar
