= Armando Crispino =

Italian film director

- Born: 18 October 1924; Biella, Italy
- Died: 6 October 2003 (aged 78); Rome, Italy
- Occupations: Film director, screenwriter
- Years active: 1965-1975
- Spouse: Franca Lumachi (m. 1963)
- Children: 2, including Gilberta Crispino

Armando Crispino (18 October 1924 – 6 October 2003) was an Italian film director and screenwriter. He was born in Biella, Piedmont. He directed nine films between 1966 and 1975. He also wrote for nine films between 1965 and 1975. He also directed two Italian horror films, Autopsy and The Dead Are Alive.

== Selected filmography ==
- Pleasant Nights (1966 - director)
- Commandos (1968 - director)
- The Dead Are Alive (1972 - director) (a.k.a. "The Etruscan Kills Again")
- Autopsy (1975 - director) (a.k.a. "Macchie Solari"/ "Sunspots")
