= The Dead Are Alive =

- Directed by: Armando Crispino
- Written by: Bryan Edgar Wallace; Lucio Battistrada; Armando Crispino; Lutz Eisholz
- Produced by: Artur Brauner
- Starring: Alex Cord; Samantha Eggar
- Cinematography: Erico Menczer
- Music by: Riz Ortolani
- Production companies: Inex Film; Mondial Televisione Film; Central Cinema Company
- Distributed by: National General Pictures
- Release date: 1972
- Running time: 105 minutes
- Countries: Italy; West Germany; Yugoslavia
- Languages: Italian; English

The Dead Are Alive (Italian: L'etrusco uccide ancora / The Etruscan Kills Again) is a 1972 giallo film by Italian director Armando Crispino, with music by Riz Ortolani, and starring Alex Cord, Samantha Eggar and John Marley. It was released in Germany as Das Geheimnis des gelben Grabes (Mystery of the Yellow Grave), in France as Overtime, and in Spain as El dios de la muerte asesina otra vez (The Death God Kills Again). The film was produced by Artur Brauner and the story was based on a giallo novel written by Bryan Edgar Wallace.

== Cast ==
- Alex Cord as Professor Jason Porter
- Samantha Eggar as Myra Shelton
- John Marley as Nikos Samarakis
- Enzo Tarascio as Inspector Giuranna
- Carlo De Mejo as Igor Samarakis
- Horst Frank as Stephen
- Enzo Cerusico as Alberto
- Daniela Surina as Irene
- Vladan Milasinovic as Otello
- Christiane Von Blank as Velia
- Mario Maranzana as Vitanza
- Pier Luigi D'Orazio as Minelli
- Wendy D'Olive as Giselle
- Ivan Pavicevac as Policeman
- Nadja Tiller as Leni Schongauer Samarakis

== Plot ==
Two young people looking for a place to make love are brutally murdered in an Etruscan tomb which had recently been violated by a group of archaeologists, led by Prof. Porter (Alex Cord). The corpses are positioned so as to indicate they were murdered as sacrifices to the Etruscan Death-god Tuchucha. Several other murders occur, focusing on members of the archeology team and friends of Prof. Porter's. The victims have their heads bashed.
