= Edwin Zbonek =

Austrian film director

- Born: 28 March 1928; Linz, Austria
- Died: 29 May 2006 (aged 78); Sankt Pölten, Austria
- Occupations: Film director Screenwriter
- Years active: 1960-1982

Edwin Zbonek (28 March 1928 – 29 May 2006) was an Austrian film director and screenwriter. He directed 14 films between 1960 and 1982. His film Man and Beast was entered into the 13th Berlin International Film Festival.

== Selected filmography ==
- Twenty Brave Men (1960)
- Deutschland – deine Sternchen (1962)
- Man and Beast (1963)
- The Hangman of London (1963)
- The Monster of London City (1964)
- 3. November 1918 (1965)
- Lumpaci the Vagabond (1965)
