= Artur Brauner =

German film producer (1918–2019)

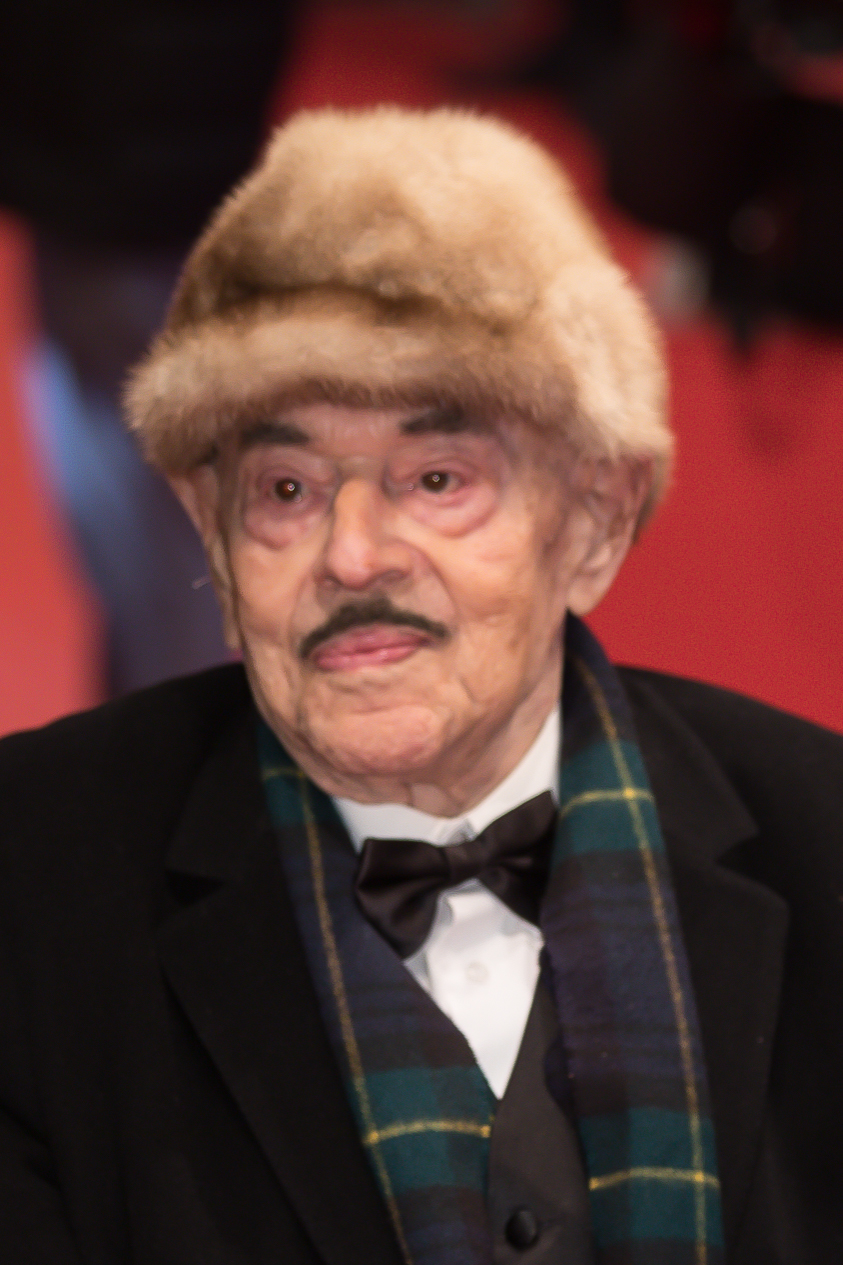
- Brauner attending the Berlinale 2018
- Born: Abraham Brauner; 1 August 1918; Łódź, State Poland
- Died: 7 July 2019 (aged 100); Berlin, Germany
- Occupation: Film producer
- Years active: 1946–2019

Artur "Atze" Brauner (born Abraham Brauner; 1 August 1918 – 7 July 2019) was a German film producer and entrepreneur of Polish origin. He produced more than 300 films from 1946.

== Life and career ==
He was born the oldest son of a Jewish family in Łódź, Poland. His father was a timber wholesaler. Brauner attended a general education liceum in Łódź, where he took the matura final exam, and then studied at a local polytechnic technical school until the German attack on Poland in September 1939. With his parents and four siblings, he fled to the Soviet Union and survived the Holocaust. Following the war, he and his brother, Wolf Brauner emigrated to Berlin; his parents and three of his siblings emigrated to Israel. Twelve of his relatives were killed at Babi Yar, among forty-nine who died at the hands of the Nazis.

Brauner married Theresa Albert, called Maria, in 1947. They had four children.

As a young man, he saw Fritz Lang's film The Testament of Dr. Mabuse, which affected him greatly, making him interested in film. In September 1946, he founded the Central Cinema Company or CCC Films in the American sector of Berlin. He produced Sag' die Wahrheit, one of the first films produced in Germany after the war, followed by Morituri, which was a commercial failure and threw him into debt. Brauner realised that to produce critically successful films he had to make up their losses by producing critically derided films that were appreciated by the public. He lured back many Germans who had experience in Hollywood such as Robert Siodmak and later Fritz Lang who started a revival of Dr. Mabuse.

In 2009, Yad Vashem received a donation of 21 of Brauner's productions having to do with the Holocaust, including Die Weiße Rose, The Plot to Assassinate Hitler (Der 20. Juli) and Man and Beast (Mensch und Bestie). In 2010, Yad Vashem opened a media center in Brauner's name. Brauner called it the "crowning achievement of my film career".

Brauner was a prominent member of the Jewish community of Berlin and a recipient of the Bundesverdienstkreuz. At the 2003 Berlinale, he was awarded the Berlinale Kamera honouring his lifetime achievement. His many other awards included two Golden Globe Awards and an Academy Award for his co-production of the film The Garden of the Finzi-Continis by Vittorio De Sica. Brauner lived and worked in Berlin. He turned 100 in August 2018.

Brauner died on 7 July 2019 in Berlin.

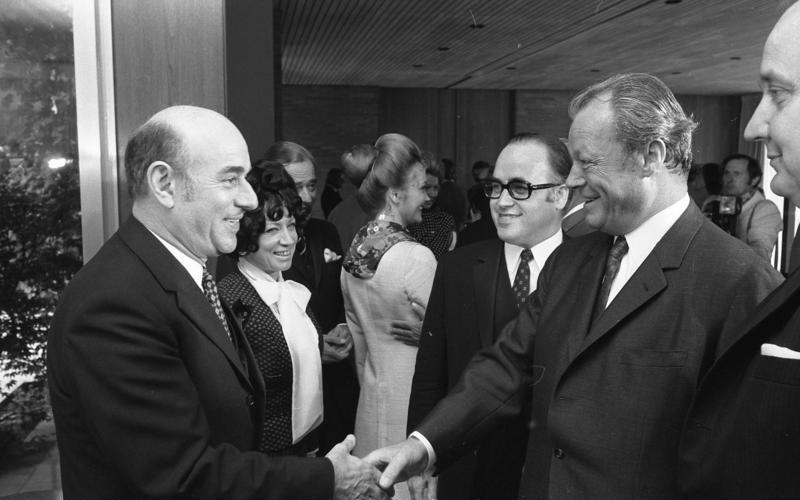
Artur Brauner (left) shaking hands with Willy Brandt (1971).

== Selected filmography ==
Brauner produced over 250 movies. Here a list of selected films produced by him:

Year	Title	Director	Notes
1946	Tell the Truth	Helmut Weiss	
1947	King of Hearts	Helmut Weiss	
1948	Morituri	Eugen York	
1949	Don't Play with Love	Hans Deppe	
1949	Girls Behind Bars	Alfred Braun	
1950	Five Suspects	Kurt Hoffmann	
1950	The Orplid Mystery	Helmut Käutner	
1950	The Reluctant Maharaja	Ákos Ráthonyi	
1952	All Clues Lead to Berlin	František Čáp	
1953	The Empress of China	Steve Sekely	
1955	The Star of Rio	Kurt Neumann	
1955	The Plot to Assassinate Hitler	Falk Harnack	German Federal Film Award
1955	Die Ratten	Robert Siodmak	Golden Bear
1955	The Captain and His Hero	Max Nosseck	
1956	Before Sundown	Gottfried Reinhardt	Golden Bear (Audience award)
1957	The Last Ones Shall Be First	Rolf Hansen	
1957	Kindermädchen für Papa gesucht	Hans Quest	
1957	Just Once a Great Lady	Erik Ode	
1958	Confess, Doctor Corda	Josef von Báky	
1958	It Happened in Broad Daylight	Ladislao Vajda	
1958	Münchhausen in Afrika	Werner Jacobs	
1958	Mädchen in Uniform	Géza von Radványi	
1958	Der Stern von Santa Clara	Werner Jacobs	
1959	Here I Am, Here I Stay	Werner Jacobs	
1959	Der Tiger von Eschnapur	Fritz Lang	
1959	Das indische Grabmal	Fritz Lang	
1959	And That on Monday Morning	Luigi Comencini	
1959	Menschen im Hotel	Gottfried Reinhardt	
1959	The Black Chapel	Ralph Habib	
1959	Abschied von den Wolken	Gottfried Reinhardt	
1959	The Day the Rains Came	Gerd Oswald	
1959	Old Heidelberg	Ernst Marischka	
1960	Sweetheart of the Gods	Gottfried Reinhardt	
1960	Mistress of the World	William Dieterle	2 films
1960	The Thousand Eyes of Dr. Mabuse	Fritz Lang	
1960	Stefanie in Rio	Curtis Bernhardt	
1960	Grounds for Divorce	Cyril Frankel	
1960	The Good Soldier Schweik	Axel von Ambesser	Nominated for a Golden Globe
1960	Sabine und die 100 Männer	Wilhelm Thiele	
1961	World in My Pocket	Alvin Rakoff	
1961	The Marriage of Mr. Mississippi	Kurt Hoffmann	
1961	Via Mala	Paul May	
1961	The Shadows Grow Longer	Ladislao Vajda	
1961	Das Riesenrad	Géza von Radványi	
1961	Robert and Bertram	Hans Deppe	
1961	The Return of Doctor Mabuse	Harald Reinl	
1961	It Can't Always Be Caviar	Géza von Radványi	
1961	This Time It Must Be Caviar	Géza von Radványi	
1962	The Brain	Freddie Francis	
1962	The Devil's Agent	John Paddy Carstairs	
1962	The Secret of the Black Trunk	Werner Klingler	
1962	Sherlock Holmes and the Deadly Necklace	Terence Fisher	
1962	Doctor Sibelius	Rudolf Jugert	
1962	The Invisible Dr. Mabuse	Harald Reinl	
1963	Station Six-Sahara	Seth Holt	
1963	The Hangman of London	Edwin Zbonek	
1963	Man and Beast	Edwin Zbonek	
1963	Scotland Yard Hunts Dr. Mabuse	Paul May	
1964	Old Shatterhand	Hugo Fregonese	
1964	Der Schut	Robert Siodmak	
1964	Fanny Hill	Russ Meyer	
1965	The Treasure of the Aztecs	Robert Siodmak	
1965	The Pyramid of the Sun God	Robert Siodmak	
1965	Wild Kurdistan	Franz Josef Gottlieb	
1965	Kingdom of the Silver Lion	Franz Josef Gottlieb	
1966	Long Legs, Long Fingers	Alfred Vohrer	
1966	Lucky the Inscrutable	Jesús Franco	
1966	Who Killed Johnny R.?	José Luis Madrid	
1966	Witness Out of Hell	Zika Mitrovic	
1966/67	Die Nibelungen	Harald Reinl	2 films
1967	The Peking Medallion	James Hill	
1968	Tevye and His Seven Daughters	Menahem Golan	
1968/69	The Last Roman	Robert Siodmak	2 films
1970	The Bird with the Crystal Plumage	Dario Argento	
1970	Vampyros Lesbos	Jesús Franco	
1970	She Killed in Ecstasy	Jesús Franco	
1970	The Devil Came from Akasava	Jesús Franco	
1970	X312 - Flight to Hell	Jesús Franco	
1970	The Garden of the Finzi-Continis	Vittorio De Sica	Academy Award
1971	The Deadly Avenger of Soho	Jesús Franco	
1971	Jungfrauen Report	Jesús Franco	
1971	Robinson and his Wild Slaves (Sexy Darlings)	Jesús Franco	
1971	Black Beauty	James Hill	
1972	The Dead Are Alive	Armando Crispino	
1972	The Vengeance of Dr. Mabuse	Jesús Franco	
1974	The Martyr	Aleksander Ford	
1977	Es muss nicht immer Kaviar sein	Thomas Engel	TV miniseries
1981	Charlotte	Frans Weisz	
1981	After Midnight	Wolf Gremm	
1982	The Passerby	Jacques Rouffio	
1982	Die Weiße Rose	Michael Verhoeven	
1983	S.A.S. à San Salvador	Raoul Coutard	
1983	A Love in Germany	Andrzej Wajda	
1984	After Your Decrees	Jerzy Hoffman	
1985	Angry Harvest	Agnieszka Holland	Nominated Academy Award
1987	Der Stein des Todes	Franz Josef Gottlieb	
1988	Hanussen	István Szabó	Nominated Academy Award
1989	The Rose Garden	Fons Rademakers	
1990	Europa Europa	Agnieszka Holland	Golden Globe
1992	Warsaw – Year 5703	Janusz Kijowski	
1996	From Hell to Hell	Dmitri Astrakhan	
2003	Babiy Yar	Jeff Kanew	
2006	The Last Train	Joseph Vilsmaier and Dana Vávrová	
2011	Wunderkinder	Marcus O. Rosenmüller	

== Publications ==
- Mich gibt's nur einmal (autobiography). Munich, Berlin: Herbig (1976) ISBN 978-3-7766-0775-8

== Awards ==
- 1965: Goldene Leinwand for Old Shatterhand
- 1965: Goldene Leinwand for Der Schut
- 1967: Goldene Leinwand for Die Nibelungen
- 1970: Golden Bear for The Garden of the Finzi-Continis
- 1972: Academy Award for The Garden of the Finzi-Continis
- 1983: Deutscher Filmpreis: Filmband in Silber for Die Weiße Rose
- 1990: Deutscher Filmpreis: Filmband in Gold for "long and outstanding work in German cinema"
- 1992: Golden Globe for Europa Europa
- 1993: Bundesverdienstkreuz I. Klasse
- 2000: Goldene Kamera
