= CCC Film =

German film company

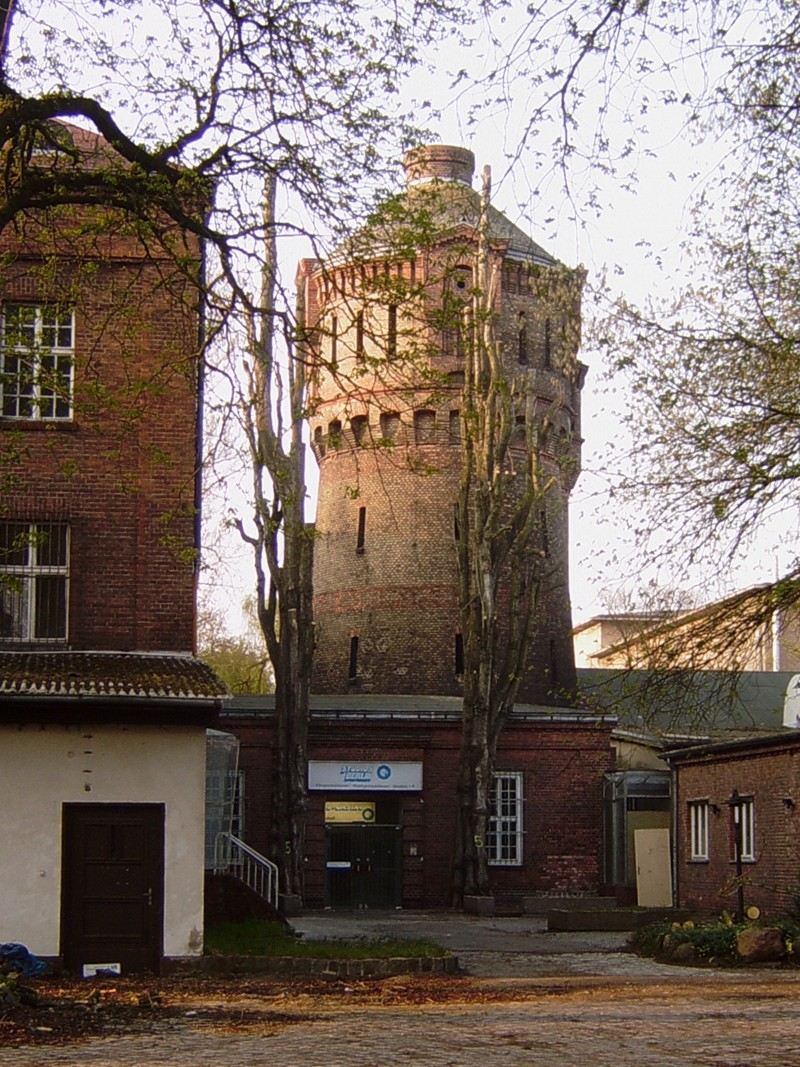
CCC Film buildings in Spandau, at the former Königliche Pulverfabrik (Royal gunpowder production founded 1717))

CCC Film (German: Central Cinema Compagnie-Film GmbH) is a German film production company founded in 1946 by Artur Brauner. A Polish Jew who survived the Nazi era by fleeing to the Soviet Union, he lost dozens of relatives to the Nazis. His primary interest was making films about the Nazi era, but after his first such film failed at the box office, throwing him into debt, he began producing entertainment films, the commercial success of which then financed his Holocaust-related films, some of which also became successful. In 2009, Brauner donated 21 Holocaust-related films to Yad Vashem.

== 1946–1950s ==
On September 16, 1946, Brauner founded CCC Film with Joseph Einstein, his brother-in-law, a black marketeer in Berlin, with a capital investment of 21,000 Reichsmarks in the American sector of postwar Germany. They had money, but no license from the American authorities, without which, it was impossible to produce anything. Two months later, Einstein quit the enterprise, leaving Brauner as sole owner.

The first CCC-produced film was the 1947 King of Hearts, followed in 1948 by partially self-autobiographical Morituri, directed by Eugen York. Morituri tells the story of a Polish refugee from a Nazi concentration camp. After a few theaters were damaged, the film was boycotted by other theaters and became a box office disaster, nearly ruining CCC Film and Brauner, and causing him to begin producing "normal films" in order to pay off his debt, as he told Time magazine in 2003. Postwar German audiences, struggling with devastated cities, homelessness and hunger, wanted escapist movies in the aftermath of World War II and Brauner filled that desire with a mixture of comedies, westerns, crime stories and the occasional drama. In 1949, Brauner finally received his license from the American authorities and CCC Film produced three successful films and moved to a former Nazi munitions and poison gas factory in Haselhorst, a locality in the Spandau district of Berlin. Brauner later said, "Out of the poison-gas factory I wanted to make a dream factory."

In the 1950s, CCC continued producing its proven mix of light-hearted fare and hired directors such as Carl Boese, Helmut Käutner, Robert Adolf Stemmle, Géza von Bolváry, Akos von Ratony, Kurt Neumann, Paul Martin and Erich Engel. Actors and actresses such as Heinz Rühmann, Maria Schell, Gert Fröbe, Klaus Kinski, Curd Jürgens and Romy Schneider were featured, some, like Kinski, making his film debut. It became one of the largest producers of postwar German-language films and helped to establish Berlin as a center of German film and television production.

CCC produced International Counterfeiters directed by Franz Cap in 1952. In 1955, the company produced The Plot to Assassinate Hitler, directed by Falk Harnack and co-written by Günther Weisenborn, about the failed July 20, 1944 attempt on Adolf Hitler's life. (Note: Both director Falk Harnack and screenwriter Günther Weisenborn were former members of the German Resistance and Weisenborn was imprisoned by the Nazis for several years. In addition, Harnack's brother, sister-in-law and cousins were all executed by the Third Reich.) Other more challenging films from the 1950s were Die Ratten (directed by Robert Siodmak) adapted from a play by Nobel Prize winner Gerhart Hauptmann; Studentin Helene Willfüer (1956, directed by Rudolf Jugert) adapted from a book by Vicki Baum; and Vor Sonnenuntergang (1956, directed by Gottfried Reinhardt), also adapted from Hauptmann.

CCC produced 19 films in 1958 and began working on large productions. By the end of the 1950s, the company had built five additional film studios on its Haselhorst property, outfitting them with equipment for film and television production.

== The 1960s ==
At the end of the 1950s, CCC began a string of Karl May films and historical dramas and Brauner brought important directors back from exile, such as Fritz Lang, Robert Siodmak, William Dieterle and Gerd Oswald. In 1959, the company produced The Tiger of Eschnapur and The Indian Tomb, directed by Lang; in 1960, Mistress of the World directed by Dieterle; and Genghis Khan directed by Henry Levin in 1964. The company also began co-producing low-budget films by American B movie directors like Hugo Fregonese and Russ Meyer. Brauner tried to establish a London production base, but abandoned this after making two films, one of which was Station Six-Sahara (1962) by Seth Holt.

In the mid-1960s, the French New Wave introduced a new, more realistic and contemporary way of filmmaking. Brauner pursued just one such project, called Man and Beast and directed by Edwin Zbonek. The effort was neither a commercial nor an artistic success. CCC then returned to its safe formula of entertainment ventures, such as Karl May films, a series of Doctor Mabuse films and movies with sequels, such as The Treasure of the Aztecs and its sequel, The Pyramid of the Sun God. Nonetheless, when German television station ZDF moved to Mainz and no longer used CCC facilities to produce their programs, Brauner was forced to reverse his company's expansion of just a few years earlier.

== The 1970s and beyond ==
In 1970, CCC Film co-produced The Garden of the Finzi Continis (Il Giardino dei Finzi-Contini) directed by Vittorio De Sica, which won the Academy Award for Best Foreign Language Film.

With his large studio space less in demand and his staff already reduced from over 200 in the 1950s to 85, Brauner closed the studios and laid off his remaining employees in September 1970, afterwards working instead on occasional projects, such as The Martyr in 1974, directed by Aleksander Ford; Eine Liebe in Deutschland in 1983, directed by Andrzej Wajda; and Hanussen in 1988, directed by István Szabó. He also continued to produce projects related to Nazi war crimes, such as Die Weiße Rose in 1983, directed by Michael Verhoeven; Europa Europa in 1990, directed by Agnieszka Holland and nominated for an Oscar. In 2003, he produced Babi Yar, directed by the American director Jeff Kanew, about the mass executions at Babi Yar, which included 12 members of Brauner's family. In 2006, Brauner produced The Last Train, directed by Joseph Vilsmaier and Dana Vávrová, about the last transport of Jews from Berlin to Auschwitz.

In 2009, Brauner donated 21 of his Holocaust-related films to Yad Vashem, and in his honor, Yad Vashem named its media research center after him.

== Sources ==
- Artur Brauner, Mich gibt's nur einmal – Rückblende eines Lebens. Munich (1978) (in German)
- Claudia Dillmann, Artur Brauner und die CCC – Filmgeschäft, Produktionsalltag, Studiogeschichte 1946–1990. Frankfurt am Main (1990) (in German)
