= Spandau Studios =

Film studios in Berlin

The Spandau Studios or CCC Studios were film and television studios located in Spandau, a suburb of Berlin. They were established in 1949 following the Second World War by the producer Artur Brauner controller of CCC Films, on the site of a former factory. Following the Soviet occupation of East Germany, most of the major film studios in the capital were, with the exception of the Tempelhof Studios, located in East Berlin until Brauner opened his own studios.

Brauner produced a number of popular genre films over the following decades, including several remakes of Weimar era hits. Space was also rented out to other firms, and the 1960s saw the series of Edgar Wallace films made at Spandau by Rialto Film.

== Bibliography ==
- Baer, Hester. Dismantling the Dream Factory: Gender, German Cinema, and the Postwar Quest for a New Film Language. Berghahn Books, 2012.
- Bergfelder, Tim. International Adventures: German Popular Cinema and European Co-Productions in the 1960s. Berghahn Books, 2005.
