= Walter Schulze-Mittendorff =

German costume and production designer (1893–1976)

- Born: Walter Georg Hermann Schulze; 31 January 1893; Berlin, German Empire
- Died: 14 August 1976 (aged 83); West Berlin, West Germany
- Occupations: Sculptor, film special effects artist and costume designer
- Years active: 1920–1968
- Notable work: The Maschinenmensch in the film Metropolis (1927)
- Spouse: Elisabeth Liewen (m. 1919; died 1949)
- Children: Bertina Schulze-Mittendorff

Walter Schulze-Mittendorff (31 January 1893 – 14 August 1976) was a German costume designer, production designer, special effects artist, and sculptor. He began his career making sculptures for silent films, moved in the late 1930s to costume design, and after the Second World War became the chief costume designer for East German film production company DEFA. Later, he designed costumes for West German TV productions.

He is probably best known for his design for the Maschinenmensch robot in Fritz Lang's 1927 film Metropolis.

== Biography ==
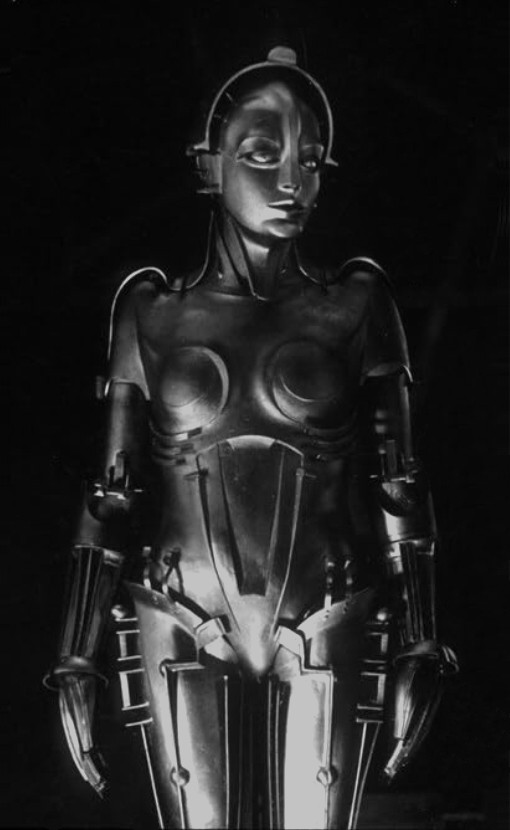
Set photograph of the Maschinenmensch from Metropolis (1927)

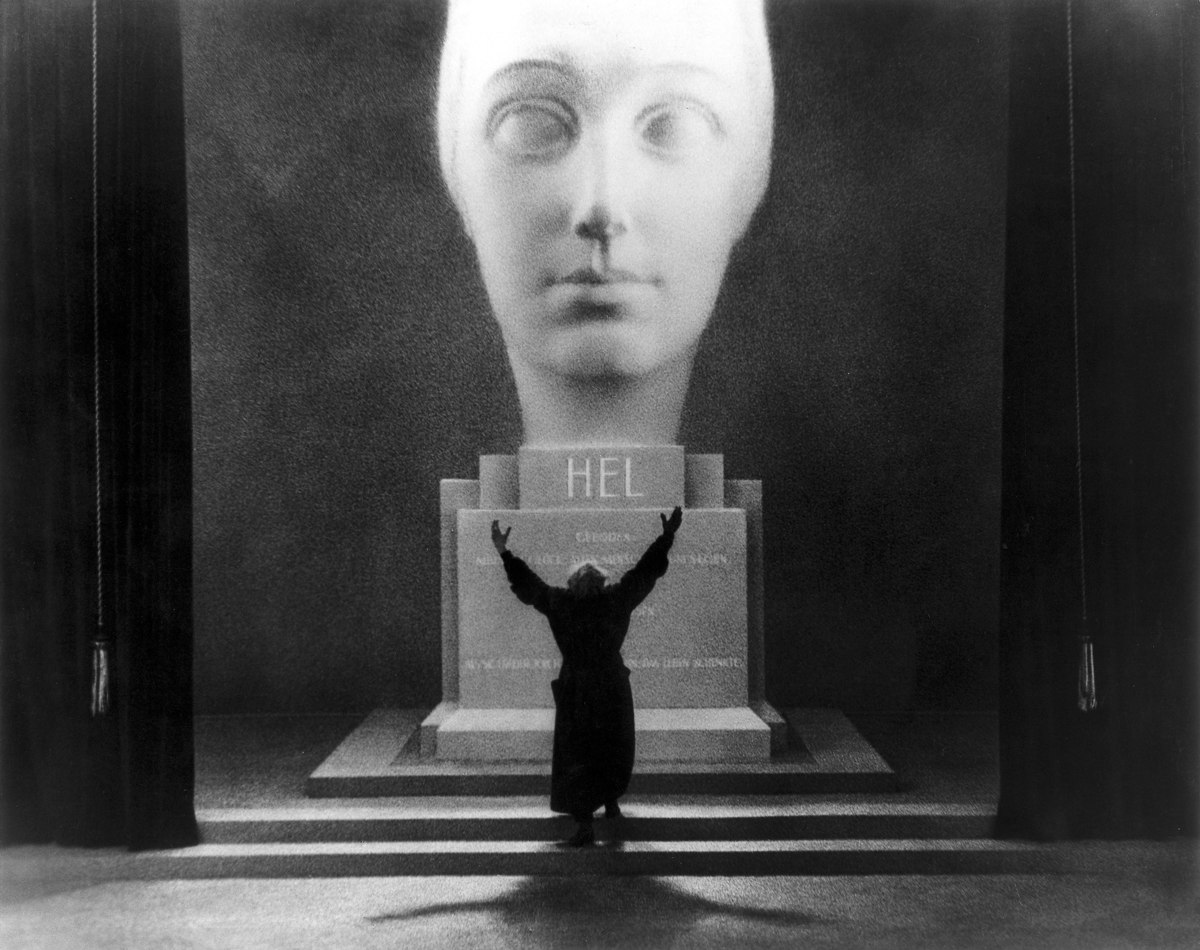
Metropolis: Rotwang (Rudolf Klein-Rogge) stands below a large head statue of Hel, an effect achieved using the Schüfftan process.

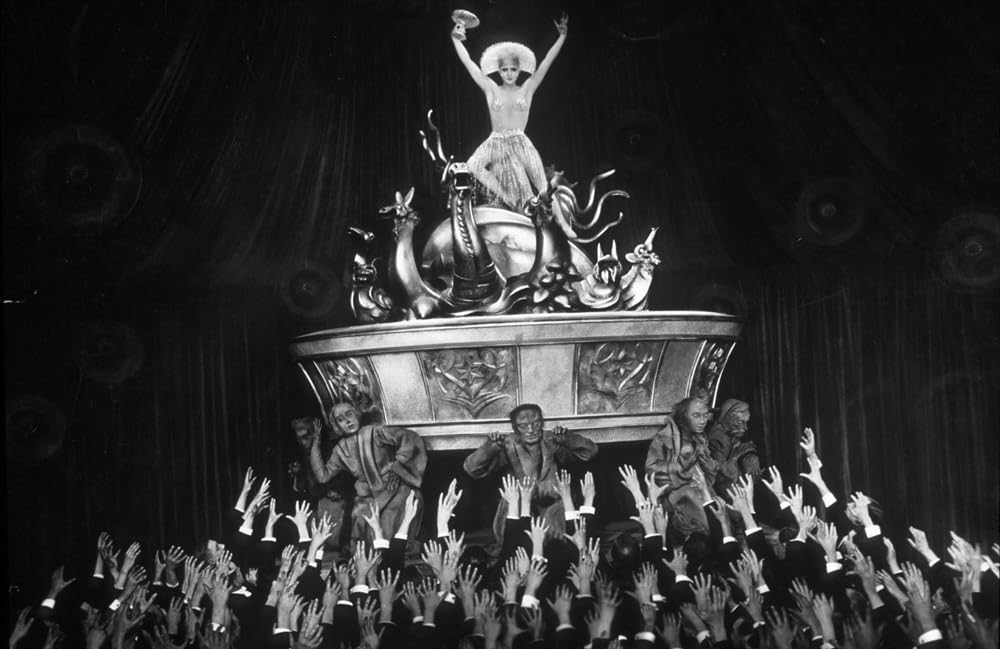
Metropolis: Brigitte Helm as the false Maria, with the Seven-Headed Beast, supported by the Seven Deadly Sins.

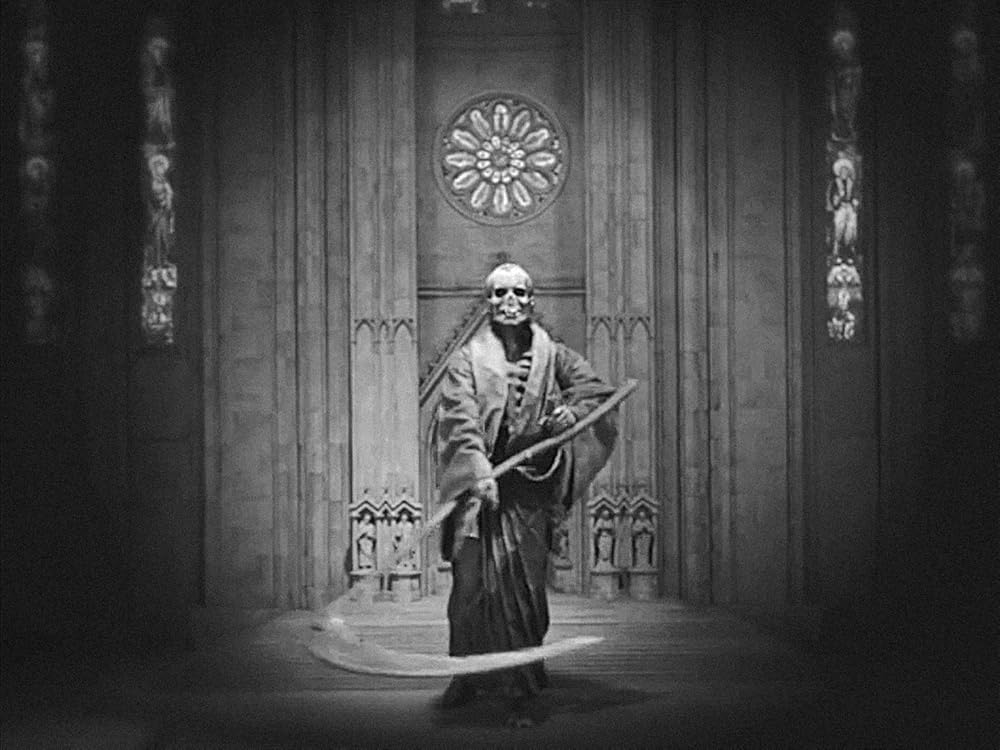
Metropolis: the moving statue of Death

=== Early years ===
Walter Schulze-Mittendorff was born Walter Georg Hermann Schulze on 31 January 1893 in Berlin. He was the son of watchmaker Georg Schulze and Agnes, née Mittendorf, both originally from Lower Silesia. He officially adopted the double surname derived from his parents' birth names in 1932. Having begun an apprenticeship as a sculptor with Otto Rossius (1877–1918) at the age of 14, he received his artistic training at the School of Applied Arts and the School of Crafts in Berlin.

After his military service from 1915 to 1919 (he was awarded the Order of Merit for Bravery, and the Iron Cross 1st and 2nd Class), he continued his studies at Prussian Academy of Arts in Berlin, and in 1920 he was accepted into the Meisteratelier (English: Masterclass) of the academy. That year, he was awarded the academy's Dr. Paul Schultze- Preis für Bildhauerei ("Prize for Sculpture") and in 1923 he was awarded the "Rome-Prize".

=== Career ===
After the First World War, Schulze-Mittendorff began to make a name for himself as a sculptor before entering the film industry in 1920 through his fellow student and friend, the film art director Robert Herlth. He was introduced to the director Fritz Lang.

==== Work with Fritz Lang ====
Some of Schulze-Mittendorff's initial contributions to cinema were for "sculptures" in several of Lang's productions, including the "Asian Deity" in Destiny, and Die Nibelungen (1924).

In 1925, Lang engaged Schulze-Mittendorff's sculptural skills for the film Metropolis (1927), and he is probably best known for his design for the "Maschinenmensch" robot portrayed by Brigitte Helm. He also designed the moving statues of "Death" and the "Seven Deadly Sins" (all are mentioned in the opening credits), the "Seven-Headed Beast", and the head of "Hel".

Later, he worked on Lang's film Spies (German: Spione) (1928). He worked on a Lang film for the last time with The Testament of Dr. Mabuse (German: Das Testament des Dr. Mabuse) (1933), where he created Dr. Mabuse's masks.

==== Work with other directors 1922–1945 ====
In 1922, Schulze-Mittendorff created the sculptures for Carl Froelich's adaptation of Intrigue and Love titled Luise Millerin, and the following year, those for Arthur von Gerlach's Chronicles of the Gray House.

In 1935, he created sculptures for Reinhold Schünzel's comedy Amphitryon, and also worked on the costume design team with the experienced stage and film art director Rochus Gliese and Manon Hahn, another costume designer making her debut. In 1937, he designed several sculptures for the film adaptation of Kleist's The Broken Jug.

In March 1940 he signed a contract as costume designer with Terra-Filmkunst GmbH. His first film as a costume designer was Clothes Make the Man (1940), an elaborate costume film set in the 19th century. Because the company was controlled by the Nazi Ministry for Propaganda, he was excused from military service and was able to protect his half-Jewish wife from persecution. His designs during the final years of the Third Reich primarily enhanced high-end to top-tier entertainment productions, including The Swedish Nightingale (1941), Andreas Schlüter (1942), and The Enchanted Day (1944); he primarily designed costumes for poetic, historical, or fairytale-operetta-like stories. In 1943, he also contributed to Heinz Rühmann's Die Feuerzangenbowle.

==== After 1945 ====
After the Second World War had ended, Schulze-Mittendorff showed three sculptures in 1945–1946 at the Berlin exhibition of visual artists organised by the Cultural Association for the Democratic Renewal of Germany.

While a resident of West Berlin, in 1947 he continued his film work with the East German film production company DEFA, which later became the state film monopoly of the German Democratic Republic, and where he later became the chief costume designer. DEFA produced socially and politically engaged films with a contemporary historical and critical background, such as Girls in Gingham (1949), The Axe of Wandsbek (1951), and Der Untertan (1951). In the early days of East German cinema, Schulze-Mittendorff was the country's leading costume designer.

However, his career with DEFA was abruptly ended by the construction of the Berlin Wall: his contract ended in 1962 and was not renewed. His designs, created up to August 1961, were used in three DEFA productions that were still in production during the winter of 1961–1962. From then on, he worked as a free-lance costume designer in West Germany, creating designs for television productions by directors including Helmut Käutner, Rudolf Noelte, and Robert A. Stemmle.

In 1964, Lotte Eisner visited him and requested that he rebuild the Maschinenmensch for the Cinémathèque Française. This second figure that he created is now in the film museum of the Cinémathèque Française in Paris.

Following his work on Noelte's film adaptation of Franz Kafka's The Castle in 1968, he retired from public life at the age of 75. He died in Wilmersdorf, West Berlin on 14 August 1976.

== The Maschinenmansch in popular culture ==
Schulze-Mittendorff's design for the Maschinenmensch robot has influenced many artists. Notable recent examples include:

- C-3PO, the humanoid robot which first appeared in Star Wars (1977)
- Fashion designer Thierry Mugler’s Maschinenmensch suit, worn by Zendaya at the London premiere of Dune: Part Two in 2024.

== Filmography ==
=== As sculptor or production designer ===
- Destiny (Der müde Tod) (1921)
- The Earl of Essex (1922)
- Luise Millerin (1922)
- Peter the Great (1922)
- The Treasure (1923)
- Die Nibelungen (2 parts) (1924)
- Chronicles of the Gray House (1925)
- Metropolis (1927)
- Spione (1928)
- The Testament of Dr. Mabuse (1933)
- Amphitryon (1935) (also as costume designer)
- The Ruler (1937)
- The Muzzle (1938)

=== As costume designer ===
- Amphitryon (1935) (also as sculptor)
- Les dieux s'amusent (1935)
- Clothes Make the Man (1940)
- Roses in Tyrol (1940)
- The Swedish Nightingale (1941)
- Rembrandt (1942)
- Andreas Schlüter (1942)
- A Man with Principles? (1943)
- Wenn die Sonne wieder scheint (1943)
- Quax in Africa (1943/47)
- Die Feuerzangenbowle (1944)
- The Enchanted Day (1944)
- Der Engel mit dem Saitenspiel (1944)
- Die tolle Susanne (1945)
- Die Fledermaus (1946)
- Wozzeck (1947)
- Und wieder 48 (1948)
- The Marriage of Figaro (1949)
- Girls in Gingham (1949)
- The Beaver Coat (1949)
- The Blue Swords (1949)
- Der Kahn der fröhlichen Leute (1950)
- The Council of the Gods (1950)
- Dr. Semmelweis (1950)
- Heart of Stone (1950)
- The Axe of Wandsbek (1951)
- Der Untertan (1951)
- Karriere in Paris (1952)
- Anna Susanna (1953)
- The Bird Seller (1953)
- Jonny Saves Nebrador (1953)
- Die Geschichte vom kleinen Muck (1953)
- Ernst Thälmann (2 parts) (1954/1955)
- Leuchtfeuer (1954)
- Mutter Courage und ihre Kinder (1955, unfinished)
- Ein Polterabend (1955)
- Der Teufel vom Mühlenberg (1955)
- Das Fräulein von Scuderi (1955)
- Thomas Muentzer (1956)
- Das tapfere Schneiderlein (1956)
- Old Barge, Young Love (1957)
- Mazurka der Liebe (1957)
- Geschwader Fledermaus (1958)
- Emilia Galotti (1958)
- Der Prozeß wird vertagt (1958)
- Kabale und Liebe (1959)
- The Goodies (1959)
- Drei Kapitel Glück (1960)
- The Strange Countess (1961)
- Five Days, Five Nights (1961)
- Der Traum des Hauptmann Loy (1961)
- Tanz am Sonnabend – Mord? (1962)
- Die schwarze Galeere (1962)
- Rotkäppchen (1962)
- Jeder stirbt für sich allein (1962)
- Die Rebellion (1962)
- A Lively Christmas Eve (1962)
- Annoncentheater. Ein Abendprogramm des Deutschen Fernsehens im Jahre 1776 (TV film, 1962)
- Die Wölfe (TV film, 1963)
- Die Kammerjungfer (TV film, 1964)
- Romulus der Große (TV film, 1965)
- Kubinke (TV film, 1965)
- Irrungen - Wirrungen (TV anthology film, 1965)
- Große Liebe (TV film, 1965)
- Rasputin (TV miniseries, 1966)
- Heinrich IV (TV film, 1966)
- Slatin Pascha (TV film, 1967)
- Anastasia (TV miniseries, 1967)
- Ein Schloß in Schweden (TV film, 1967)
- Der Eismann kommt (TV film, 1968)
- The Castle (1968)
