= The Secret of Dr. Mabuse =

- Directed by: Hugo Fregonese
- Screenplay by: Ladislas Fodor
- Produced by: Artur Brauner
- Starring: Peter van Eyck; O. E. Hasse; Yvonne Furneaux; Rika Dialina
- Cinematography: Riccardo Pallottini
- Edited by: Alfred Srp
- Music by: Carlos Diernhammer; Oskar Sala
- Production companies: CCC Filmkunst GmbH; Franco-London-Films S.A.; Serena Film S.a.r.l.
- Release date: 18 September 1964 (West Germany)
- Running time: 91 minutes
- Countries: West Germany; France; Italy

The Secret of Dr. Mabuse or The Death Ray of Dr. Mabuse (German: Die Todesstrahlen des Dr. Mabuse) is a 1964 Franco-German-Italian international co-production science fiction Eurospy crime film directed by Hugo Fregonese and Victor De Santis and starring Peter van Eyck, O.E. Hasse and Yvonne Furneaux. It was a co-production between France, Italy and West Germany. The film was the last in a series of films which had revived the Weimar era character Doctor Mabuse.

The film's sets were designed by the art directors Ernst H. Albrecht and Wilhelm Vorwerg. It was shot at the Spandau Studios in Berlin.

== Plot ==
British Secret Service agent Major Anders investigates Professor Larsen who has invented a death ray on his island. Arch criminal Dr. Mabuse is among the parties anxious to get their hands on this new technology. Anders leads an army of frogmen to stop Larsen and Mabuse.

== Cast ==
- Peter van Eyck as Maj. Bob Anders
- O.E. Hasse as Prof. Larsen
- Yvonne Furneaux as Gilda Larsen (dubbed by Edith Elsholtzt)
- Rika Dialina as Judy
- Wolfgang Preiss as Dr. Mabuse's ghost
- Walter Rilla as Prof. Pohland
- Ernst Schroder as Chefarzt
- Robert Beatty as Col. Matson (dubbed by Heinz Giese)
- Valéry Inkijinoff as Dr. Krishna (dubbed by Fritz Tillmann)
- Dieter Eppler as Kaspar (dubbed by Alexander Welbat)
- Claudio Gora as Direktor Botani alias "Dr. Mabuse" (dubbed by Erich Fiedler)
- Gustavo Rojo as Mario Monta (dubbed by Gerd Martienzen)
- Massimo Pietrobon as Jason Monta (dubbed by Friedrich Schoenfelder)
- Charles Fawcett as Cmdr. Adams (dubbed by Siegfried Schürenberg)
- Leo Genn as Adm. Quency (dubbed by Arnold Marquis)
- Yoko Tani as Mercedes (dubbed by Renate Danz)

== Release ==
The Secret of Dr. Mabuse was released in West Germany on 18 September 1964.

== Reception ==
Creature Feature gave the movie two stars, calling it dreary.

== Bibliography ==
- Haase, Holger: The Many Masks of Dr. Mabuse: Mabuse in the 1960s. (Kindle 2020)
- Reimer, Robert C. & Reimer, Carol J. The A to Z of German Cinema. Scarecrow Press, 2010.
