= Ernst Schröder =

Ernst Schröder may refer to:

- Ernst Schröder (actor) (1915–1994), German actor
- Ernst Schröder (mathematician) (1841–1902), German mathematician
