= The Captain and His Hero =

1955 film

- Directed by: Max Nosseck
- Written by: Claus Hubalek (play); Karl-Wilhelm Vivier
- Produced by: Artur Brauner; Wolf Brauner
- Starring: Ernst Schröder; Jo Herbst; Fita Benkhoff
- Cinematography: Georg Bruckbauer; Karl Löb; Igor Oberberg
- Edited by: Annemarie Rokoss
- Music by: Martin Böttcher
- Production company: CCC Film
- Distributed by: Eden-Film
- Release date: 8 July 1955
- Running time: 87 minutes
- Country: West Germany
- Language: German

The Captain and His Hero (German: Der Hauptmann und sein Held) is a 1955 West German drama film directed by Max Nosseck and starring Ernst Schröder, Jo Herbst and Fita Benkhoff. It was shot at the Spandau Studios in West Berlin. The film's sets were designed by the art director Hans Luigi.

== Cast ==
- Ernst Schröder as Hauptmann Eisenhecker
- Jo Herbst as Paul Kellermann / Franz Kellermann
- Fita Benkhoff as Frau Kellermann
- Ilse Steppat as Yvonne
- Ingeborg Schöner as Ilse
- Fritz Wagner as Hauptmann Peppmöller
- Bruno Fritz as Hauptfeldwebel Krenke
- Günter Pfitzmann as Hauptmann Roeder
- Wolfgang Müller as Schreiber Kunze
- Ernst Stahl-Nachbaur as General
- Clemens Hasse as Unteroffizier Nebelzahn
- Wolfgang Gruner as Rekrut Ladiges
- Else Reval
- Joseph Noerden
- Ralf Wolter as Ängstlicher Rekrut
- Rolf Moebius
- Heinz Giese as Rekrutierungsoffizier
- Wolfgang Völz as Oberleutnant
- Curt Ackermann as General
- Werner Peters as Hauptmann Roeder
- Heinz Petruo as Stabsarzt bei Musterung
- Friedrich Schütter as Soldat

== Bibliography ==
- Frodon, Jean-Michel, ed. (2010). Cinema and the Shoah. Translated by Harrison, Anna; Mes, Tom. SUNY Press. ISBN 978-1-4384-3028-7.
