= Maschinenmensch =

Fictional character in Metropolis

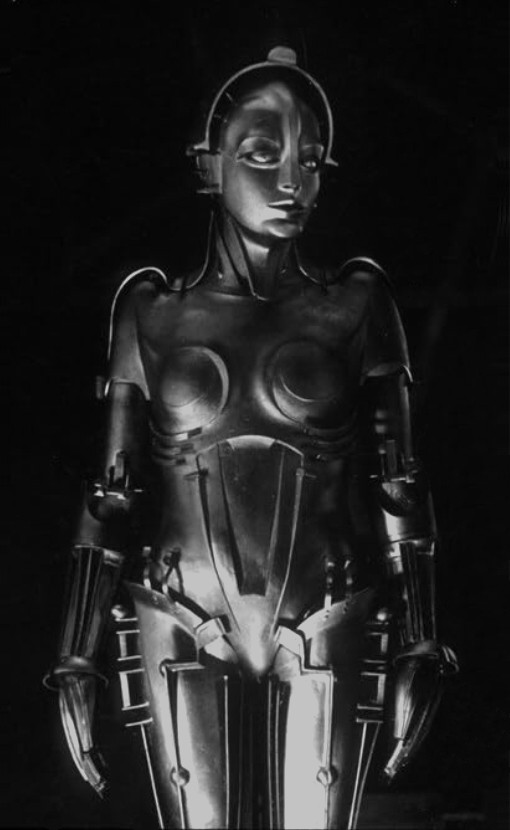
- The Maschinenmensch (Machine-Human) in Fritz Lang's film Metropolis
- First appearance: Metropolis
- Created by: Thea von Harbou; Fritz Lang
- Designed by: Walter Schulze-Mittendorff
- Portrayed by: Brigitte Helm

In-universe information
- Species: Robot
- Gender: Female
- Family: Rotwang (creator)

The Maschinenmensch (lit. 'machine-human' in German) is a fictional humanoid robot featured in Thea von Harbou's novel Metropolis and Fritz Lang's film adaptation of the novel. In the film, she is played by German actress Brigitte Helm both as a robot and in human guise. She was created by the scientist Rotwang in dedication to his deceased lover, Hel, though in the novel they have no correlation. The Maschinenmensch was one of the first fictional robots ever depicted in cinema, and as a result popularized the concept worldwide.

== Variant names ==
The robot was never named in the film or the novel. In the novel, Rotwang, the gynoid's creator, explains it is "whatever you like to call it", and offers "Futura" or "Parody" as possibilities. The intertitles of the 2010 restoration of Metropolis quote Rotwang as referring to his "Maschinenmensch", literally translated as "machine-human". Maschinenmensch is also shown in the opening titles.

== Versions ==
=== Novel ===
In the novel, the rioting workers destroy the Maschinenmensch by burning it at the stake. Though mention is made of Rotwang's former lover, Hel, they are never directly associated with each other.

=== Film ===
Scene of the Maschinenmensch from the 1927 film

The film version is different due to limitations of the practical special effects available at the time. The Maschinenmensch is a metallic automaton shaped like a woman. In the film version Rotwang proclaims that Hel, his former lover, will come alive again in the form of the automaton. Hel had chosen Fredersen over Rotwang, who never forgave his rival. As in the novel, the workers destroy the Maschinenmensch by burning it at the stake.

Walter Schulze-Mittendorff, who designed the robot costume, described how it was made. He had considered making the robot from beaten copper, but it would be too heavy to wear and difficult to achieve. He then discovered a sample of "plastic wood", a new material which was easy to sculpt into the required shape. Using a plaster body cast of actress Brigitte Helm, Mittendorff cut large chunks of plastic wood, rolled them flat, and molded them onto the cast like pieces in a suit of armour. Once the material had dried, a layer of spray-on cellon varnish mixed with silvery bronze powder was applied, giving the appearance of polished metal to the costume. The description in the original film script makes an analogy to an Egyptian statue.

The 2010 restoration of Metropolis revealed a previously unseen scene where Rotwang confides his plans to the robot. The shot is unusual because it reveals part of the back of the robot, namely the back of her head and shoulders.

The cast was made while Helm was standing up, making movements such as sitting down difficult and uncomfortable. According to actor Rudolf Klein-Rogge, it was tight and confining, pinching and scratching Helm despite many attempts by the stagehands to file away all sharp edges. People took pity on Helm and slipped coins into slots in the armour, which she collected to buy chocolate in the canteen. The scene where Rotwang presents his creation to Fredersen took nine days to film in January 1926. Director Fritz Lang shot the scene so many times that an exhausted Helm asked him why she should play the role, when no one would possibly know she was inside the costume. Lang answered, "I'd know." Helm's son believes that Lang was trying to teach the 17-year-old girl some discipline and mold her in his image, almost like the characters she played. The costume allowed little freedom of movement. To help Helm get up from the throne made of sheet metal, a wooden rig was constructed, so that a stage hand could give her a push. Behind the scenes stills show the rig and the hinged plate on the seat.

The transformation scene was considered a ground-breaking special effect of the time, using a series of matte cutouts of the robot's silhouette and a number of circular neon lights. All effects were filmed directly into the camera rather than edited separately. As a result, the film had to be rewound and exposed many tens of times over to include the plates showing the heart and circulatory systems as well as cuts between the robot form and Maria showing her gradual transformation.

For years, people have speculated how the light circle animation was made. The magazine Science and Invention suggested at the time that fluorescent lights were used as a purely practical effect, moved up and down manually on invisible wires by stage hands. In later years Lang said in interviews that a brightly lit steel ball used as a pendulum was filmed or photographed with a long exposure time in front of a black screen and was then composited onto the image, though this is not consistent with the multiple exposure method used.

According to the film's set designer, Erich Kettelhut, a glass plate was positioned halfway between the robot and the camera. The silhouette of the robot and throne were carefully drawn onto a piece of plywood to be used as a matte, and using a pair of circular neon lights of a diameter corresponding with the matte's silhouette. By covering the glass plate with grease and filming the moving lights through it the illusion of a light circle moving up and down was created.

When playing human Maria's evil twin — the gynoid in human form — Brigitte Helm wore heavy makeup and her expressions, gestures, and poses were exaggerated and jerky compared to Maria's composed and demure demeanor.

The Maschinenmensch is an archetypal example of the Frankenstein creation. Artificial beings with a malevolent nature were popular at the time, as seen in films such as Der Golem or Marcel L'Herbier's L'Inhumaine. In a formerly lost portion of the film, Rotwang explicitly instructs the robot to bring down Fredersen and Metropolis, which helps explain her destructive behaviour. Different incomplete restorations of the film made since the original offered different explanations of the robot's behavior. One, for example, says that Rotwang has in fact lost control of the robot and it is not under anyone's control. Others offer no explanation. The 2010 restoration, complete for all practical purposes, depicts Rotwang deliberately instructing the robot Maria, thus finally clarifying the gynoid Maria's motivation.

== Popular culture ==
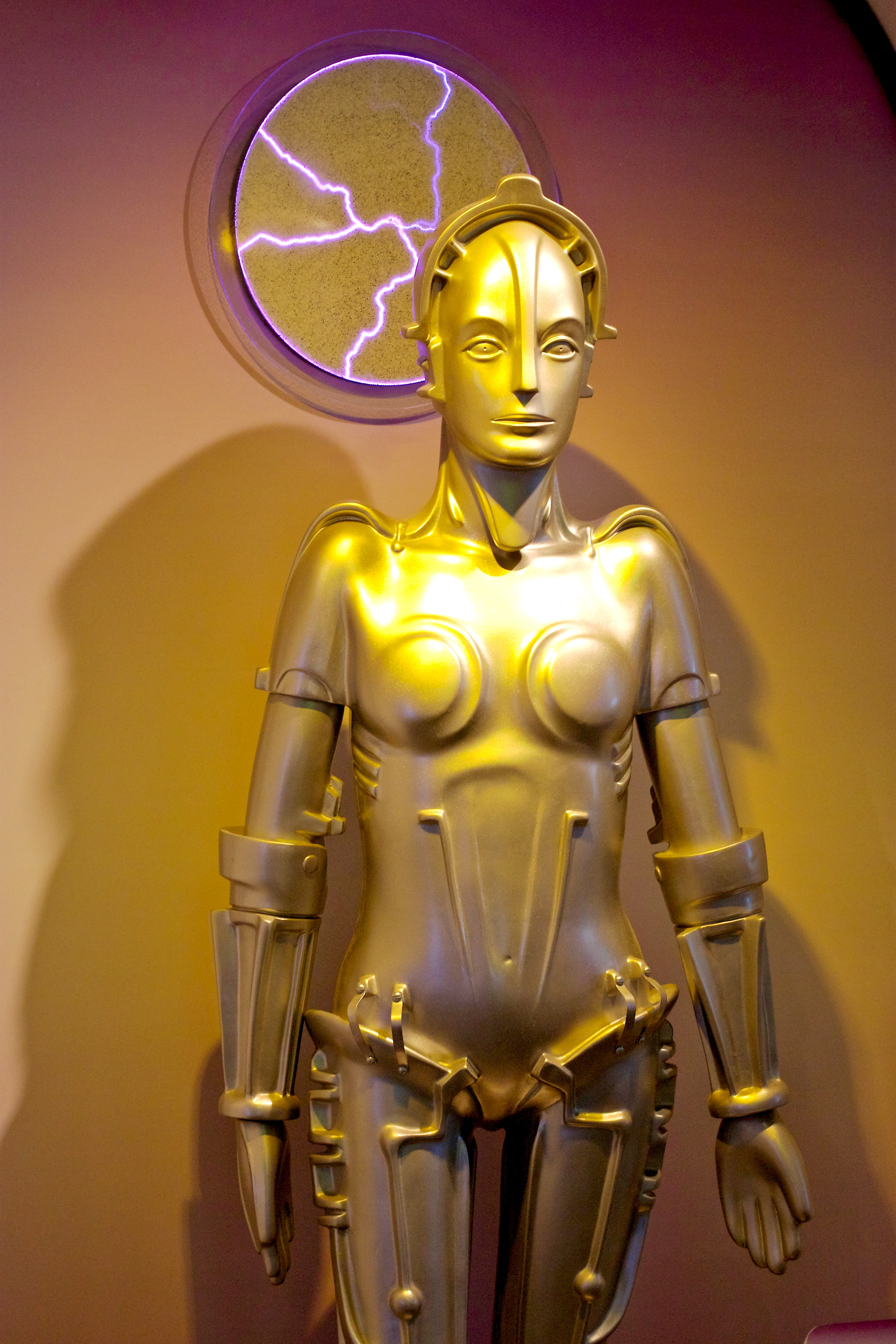
A replica of the Maschinenmensch (or machine-human) from Metropolis (1927) on display at the Robot Hall of Fame

The Maschinenmensch's appearance and concept has influenced many artists over the years. It was depicted on the 1977 album Live! In The Air Age by Be-Bop Deluxe. The still displayed on the album is of the climactic scene, in which the appearance of Maria is being installed onto the robot and rings of light are circling around the robot's body. Heavy metal band Y&T's 1985 album Down for the Count cover art shows the robot being held by Count Dracula as he prepares to sink his fangs into her neck. German band Kraftwerk's 1978 album Die Mensch-Maschine is a clear reference to the film and has a track titled "Metropolis". Original designs by Ralph McQuarrie for C-3PO in Star Wars were largely based on the Maschinenmensch, albeit in a male version. The design was later refined, but retains clear Art Deco influences. Japan's Ultraman design may have been influenced by this also. It featured in the video clip of Queen's song "Radio Ga Ga", in which Freddie Mercury's face was superimposed on the robot's face.

Fashion designer Thierry Mugler created several outfits in silver metal and transparent plastic for one of his collections in the 1990s. Pop singers Beyoncé, Madonna, Kylie Minogue and Lady Gaga have used outfits inspired by the Maschinenmensch and Janelle Monáe was directly influenced by the concept of the Maschinenmensch in the creation of her Metropolis suite album. Whitney Houston's music video for "Queen of the Night" makes frequent use of shots of the Maschinenmensch, particularly where Maria's body is transferred onto the robot and a replica can be seen in the dance rehearsal room of Rachel Marron (Whitney Houston) in the film The Bodyguard (1992). In the BBC series Torchwood series 1 episode 4 ("Cyberwoman"), the CGI sequence of the Cyberwoman's resurrection is reminiscent of that of the Maschinenmensch, featuring similar glowing rings of light around a static female robotic figure. The Doctor Who audio story "Monsters in Metropolis" produced by Big Finish tells an alternative version of Metropolis' production, in which the Maschinenmensch is played by a damaged Cyberman, which eventually starts murdering film crew.

== Replicas ==
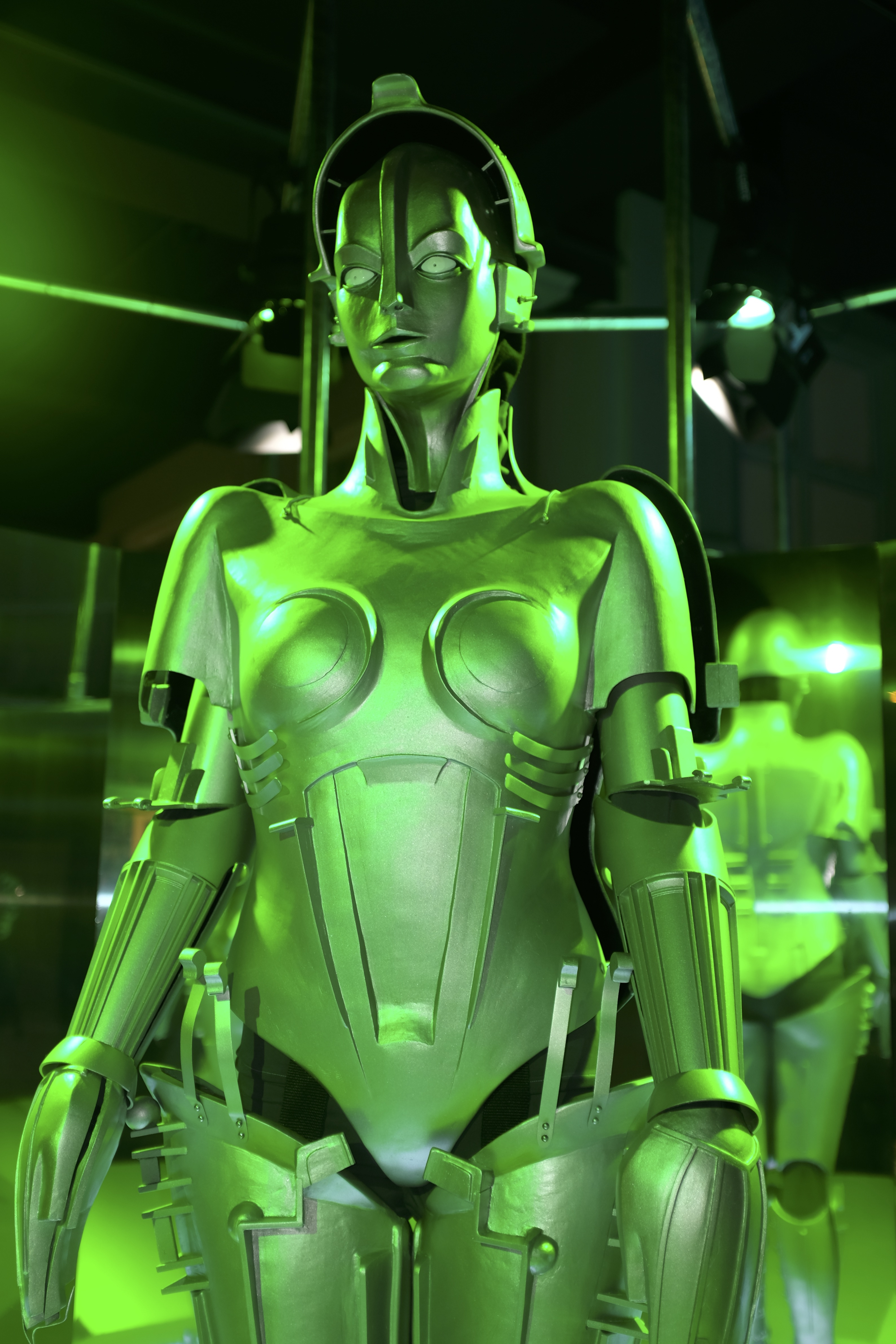
A 2016 replica of Walter Schulze-Mittendorff's Maschinenmensch in the Science Museum, London

Though some props and costumes from Metropolis did survive, the iconic Maschinenmensch was probably destroyed during filming; its actual fate is unknown.

Replicas of the robot are found in many museums, notably in the Deutsche Kinemathek in Berlin, the Cinémathèque française in Paris, and the Science Museum in London. Oddly enough, almost all versions are silver rather than the original golden-bronze colour.

- One made by Walter Schulze-Mittendorff for Henri Langlois in the 1970s is on permanent display in the Cinématheque in Paris-Bercy. The Bibliothèque du Film attached to the Cinématheque set up a very detailed website about its replica.
- In 2006, the Maschinenmensch was inducted into the Robot Hall of Fame in Pittsburgh, Pennsylvania. A replica can be seen at the Carnegie Science Center in Pittsburgh.
- Forrest J. Ackerman had a replica made by sculptor Bill Malone.
- An official replica made by Strausstoys/Germany can be seen at the Science Fiction Museum and Hall of Fame in Seattle, Washington.
- The 1996 Deutscher Filmpreis ceremony had the Maschinenmensch (played by actress Elke Berges) distribute the awards.
- An official replica of the costume by Kropserkel Inc. and WSM Art Management (the family of Walter Schulze-Mittendorff) is being constructed at a dedicated web page.
- The Science Museum in London acquired a state-of-the-art Kropserkel replica in 2016 for their major "Robots" exhibition.

== See also ==
- List of fictional gynoids
- The Man-Machine

== Works cited ==
- Metropolis, Thea von Harbou, New York, Ace Books
- Piccadilly Theatre Program "Metropolis" 1989
- Science and Invention June 1927 issue
- Fritz Langs Metropolis, Belleville, 2010, ISBN 9783923646210
- Metropolis, un film de Fritz Lang, Images d'un tournage, France, La Cinematheque Francaise, 1985, ISBN 2867540240
- Metropolis, Ein Filmisches Laboratorium der modernen Architektur, Wolfgang Jacobsen and Werner Sudendorf, Edition Axel Menges, 2000, ISBN 3930698854
- "Metropolis", DVD-Studienfassung, Universität der Künste Berlin, 2005
