= Love Without Illusions =

1955 film

- Directed by: Erich Engel
- Written by: Ladislas Fodor (play); Paul Helwig; Max Kolpé; Dinah Nelken
- Produced by: Artur Brauner
- Starring: Sonja Ziemann; Curd Jürgens; Heidemarie Hatheyer
- Cinematography: Georg Bruckbauer
- Edited by: Ira Oberberg
- Music by: Herbert Trantow
- Production company: CCC Film
- Distributed by: Prisma Film; Constantin Film
- Release date: 7 April 1955
- Running time: 88 minutes
- Country: West Germany
- Language: German

Love Without Illusions (German: Liebe ohne Illusion) is a 1955 West German drama film directed by Erich Engel and starring Sonja Ziemann, Curd Jürgens and Heidemarie Hatheyer. It was shot at the Spandau Studios in Berlin with location shooting around the city including at Tempelhof Airport. The film's sets were designed by the art director Rolf Zehetbauer.

== Synopsis ==
While her badly wounded husband is held as a prisoner of war, a woman has become a doctor. When he is finally released he is unable to resume his former career as an actor, putting a strain on their marriage.

== Cast ==
- Sonja Ziemann as Ursula
- Curd Jürgens as Walter
- Heidemarie Hatheyer as Christa
- Ernst Schröder as Jellinek
- Leonard Steckel as Professor Dürkheim
- Maria Sebaldt as Nelli
- Gert Günther Hoffmann as Fritz
- Hans Emons
- Karin Evans
- Lou Seitz
- Edelweiß Malchin
- Erich Fiedler as Modeschau-Conferancier
- Heinz Giese
- Gert Kollat

== Bibliography ==
- Hake, Sabine. German National Cinema. Routledge, 2013.
