= What Belongs to Darkness =

1922 film directed by Martin Hartwig

- Directed by: Martin Hartwig
- Written by: Arthur Robison
- Starring: Karl Etlinger; Erra Bognar; Fritz Kortner
- Production company: Deutsche Mutoskop und Biograph
- Release date: 8 December 1922
- Country: Germany
- Languages: Silent; German intertitles

What Belongs to Darkness (German: Die Finsternis und ihr Eigentum) is a 1922 German silent drama film directed by Martin Hartwig and starring Karl Etlinger, Erra Bognar, and Fritz Kortner.

The film's sets were designed by the art director Alfred Columbus.

== Cast ==
- Karl Etlinger as Professor
- Erra Bognar as Daughter of the professor
- Fritz Kortner as Gangster
- Walter Janssen as Young man
- Hans Adalbert Schlettow as Prisoner
- Waldemar Potier
- Daisy Torrens

== Bibliography ==
- Grange, William (2008). Cultural Chronicle of the Weimar Republic. Lanham, MD: Scarecrow Press. ISBN 978-0-8108-5967-8.
