= Metropolis (1927 film) =

German silent science-fiction film

- Theatrical release poster by Heinz Schulz-Neudamm
- Directed by: Fritz Lang
- Screenplay by: Thea von Harbou
- Based on: Metropolis by Thea von Harbou
- Produced by: Erich Pommer
- Starring: Brigitte Helm; Gustav Fröhlich; Alfred Abel; Rudolf Klein-Rogge
- Cinematography: Karl Freund; Günther Rittau
- Music by: Gottfried Huppertz
- Production company: UFA
- Distributed by: Parufamet
- Release date: 10 January 1927
- Running time: 153 minutes (original German release)
- Country: Germany
- Languages: Silent film; German intertitles
- Budget: 5.3 million ℛ︁ℳ︁ (estimated) (equivalent to €21 million 2021)
- Box office: 75,000 ℛ︁ℳ︁ (estimated), $1 million (U.S. and Canada rentals)

Metropolis is a 1927 German expressionist science-fiction, silent film directed by Fritz Lang and written by Thea von Harbou in collaboration with Lang, based on von Harbou's 1925 novel of the same name (which was written as a treatment). It stars Brigitte Helm, Gustav Fröhlich, Alfred Abel, and Rudolf Klein-Rogge. Erich Pommer produced it in the Babelsberg Studio for Universum Film A.G. (UFA). Metropolis is regarded as a pioneering science-fiction film, being among the first feature-length ones of that genre. Filming took place over 17 months in 1925–1926 at a cost of more than five million Reichsmarks, or the equivalent of about €21 million.

Made in Germany during the Weimar period, Metropolis is set in a futuristic urban dystopia and follows the attempts of Freder, the wealthy son of the city master, and Maria, a saintly figure to the workers, to overcome the vast gulf separating the classes in their city and bring the workers together with Joh Fredersen, the city master. The film's message is encompassed in the final intertitle: "The Mediator Between the Head and the Hands Must Be the Heart".

Metropolis met a mixed reception upon release. Critics found it visually beautiful and powerful – the film's art direction by Otto Hunte, Erich Kettelhut, and Karl Vollbrecht draws influence from opera, Bauhaus, Cubist, and Futurist design, along with touches of the Gothic in the scenes in the catacombs, the cathedral and Rotwang's house – and lauded its complex special effects, but accused its story of being naïve. H. G. Wells described the film as "silly", and The Encyclopedia of Science Fiction calls the story "trite" and its politics "ludicrously simplistic". Its alleged communist message was also criticized.

The film's long running time also came in for criticism. It was cut substantially after its German premiere. Many attempts have been made since the 1970s to restore the film. In 1984, Italian music producer Giorgio Moroder released a truncated version with a soundtrack by rock artists including Freddie Mercury, Loverboy, Bonnie Tyler, and Adam Ant. In 2001, a new reconstruction of Metropolis was shown at the Berlin Film Festival. In 2008, a damaged print of Lang's original cut of the film was found in a museum in Argentina. Footage from this print and a second one archived in New Zealand was restored and re-integrated into the film, bringing it to within five minutes of its original running time. This version was shown on large screens in Berlin and Frankfurt simultaneously on 12 February 2010.

Metropolis is now widely regarded as being one of the greatest and most influential films ever made, ranking 67th in Sight and Sound's 2022 critics' poll, and receiving general critical acclaim. In 2001, the film was inscribed on UNESCO's Memory of the World International Register, the first film thus distinguished. On 1 January 2023, the film's American reserved copyright expired, and the film entered the public domain in the U.S.

== Plot ==
Metropolis, as reconstructed in 2010

In a dystopian world, wealthy industrialists and business magnates and their top employees reign over the city of Metropolis from colossal skyscrapers, while underground-dwelling workers toil to operate the great machines that power it. Joh Fredersen is the city's master. His son, Freder, idles away his time at sports and in a pleasure garden, but is interrupted by the arrival of a young woman named Maria, who has brought a group of workers' children to witness the lifestyle of their rich "brothers".

Maria and the children are ushered away, but Freder becomes fascinated by her. Against the strict rules of the city, he enters the lower levels to search for her. In the machine halls, he witnesses the explosion of a huge machine that kills and injures numerous workers. Freder has a hallucination that the machine is a temple of Moloch and the workers are being fed to it. When the hallucination ends, and he sees the dead workers being carried away on stretchers, he rushes to tell his father about the accident.

Grot, foreman of the Heart Machine, brings Fredersen two maps found in the dead workers' pockets. Fredersen fires his assistant Josaphat for not being the first to bring him details about the explosion or the maps. After seeing his father's cold indifference towards the harsh conditions faced by the workers, Freder secretly rebels by deciding to help them. He enlists Josaphat's assistance and returns to the machine halls, taking the place of a worker who has collapsed from exhaustion.

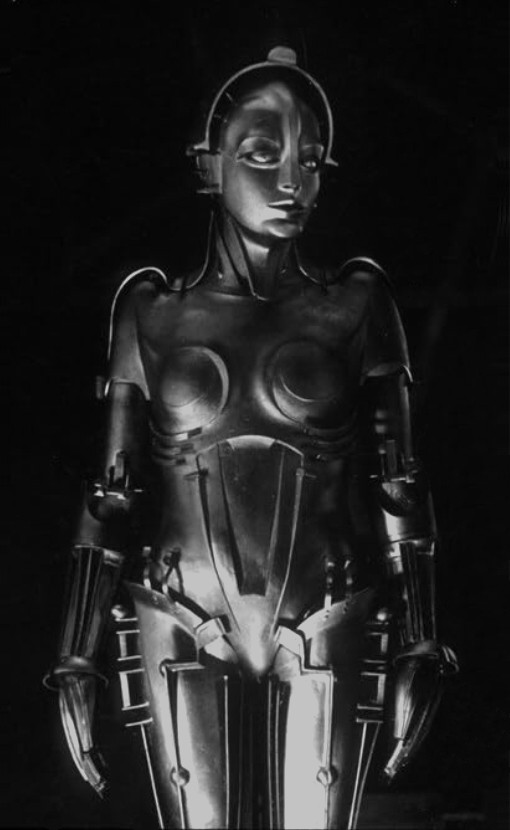
Set photograph of the Maschinenmensch from Metropolis

Fredersen takes the maps to the city's greatest inventor, Rotwang, to learn their meaning. Rotwang had been in love with a woman named Hel, who left him to marry Fredersen and later died giving birth to Freder. Rotwang shows Fredersen a robot he has built to "resurrect" Hel. The maps show a network of catacombs beneath Metropolis, and the two men go to investigate. They eavesdrop on a gathering of workers, including Freder. Maria addresses them, prophesying the arrival of a mediator who can bring the working and ruling classes together. Freder believes he can fill the role and declares his love for Maria.

Fredersen orders Rotwang to give Maria's likeness to the robot so that it can discredit her among the workers, but is unaware of Rotwang's true plan to destroy Metropolis and kill Freder in revenge. Rotwang kidnaps Maria, fashions the robot in her image, and presents her to Fredersen. Freder finds the two embracing and, believing his father to have betrayed him, falls into a prolonged delirium. The false Maria dances sensuously at Rotwang's house and the Yoshiwara club, causing mayhem—the wealthy men do not recognize she is a machine. Intercut with Freder's hallucinations, the false Maria preaches to the workers that they must rise up against the surface world, resulting in chaos and dissent.

Freder recovers and returns to the catacombs, accompanied by Josaphat. Finding the false Maria urging the workers to destroy the machines, he accuses her of not being the real Maria. The workers ignore him and carry out her wishes, smashing the machines and triggering a great flood in their underground city that threatens to drown their children. Fredersen and Rotwang struggle, and the real Maria, having escaped from Rotwang's house, rescues the children with help from Freder and Josaphat. Grot berates the celebrating workers for abandoning their children in the flood. The workers become hysterical and condemn the false Maria, burning her at the stake. A horrified Freder watches until the fire reveals her to be a robot. Rotwang, now suffering from a delusion that Maria is Hel, chases her to the roof of the cathedral, pursued by Freder. The two men fight as Fredersen and the workers watch from the street, and Rotwang falls to his death. Freder fulfills his destiny to unite the two halves of Metropolis' society by linking the hands of Fredersen and Grot to bring them together.

== Cast ==
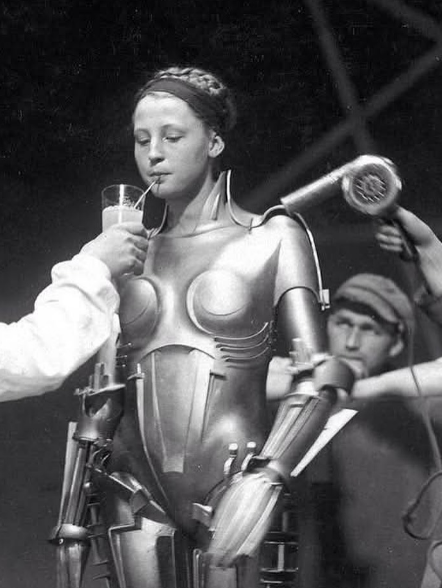
Brigitte Helm on set as the Maschinenmensch.

- Brigitte Helm as Maria / the Machine Human (Note: In the film's opening credits, several characters appear in the cast list without the names of the actors who play them: The Creative Man, the Machine Man, Death, and the Seven Deadly Sins. These roles are sometimes incorrectly attributed to Brigitte Helm, since they appear just above her credit line. Brigitte Helm actually did perform the role of the Maschinenmensch, as shown by production stills which show her inside the robot costume.)
- Gustav Fröhlich as Freder, Joh Fredersen's son
- Alfred Abel as Joh Fredersen, the master of Metropolis
- Rudolf Klein-Rogge as Rotwang, the inventor
- Fritz Rasp as the Thin Man, Fredersen's spy
- Theodor Loos as Josaphat, Fredersen's assistant and Freder's friend
- Erwin Biswanger as 11811, a worker, also known as Georgy
- Heinrich George as Grot, guardian of the Heart Machine
- Heinrich Gotho as Master of Ceremonies in Pleasure Gardens (uncredited)

=== Cast notes ===
- Four roles (The Creative Man, the Machine Man, Death, the Seven Deadly Sins) are included in the opening credits but do not list any actors' names.
- Among the uncredited actors are Margarete Lanner, Helen von Münchofen, Olaf Storm, Georg John, Helene Weigel and Fritz Alberti.
- One scene in which Freder listens to a monk preaching in the city cathedral has been lost. However, the 2010 restoration includes a call-back to the scene, with Freder hallucinating that the Thin Man is the monk.

== Influences ==
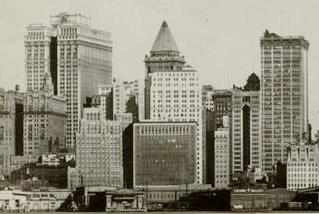
Manhattan skyline in 1912

The New Tower of Babel, Fredersen's headquarters in Metropolis

The Tower of Babel in Maria's recounting of the biblical story was modeled after this 1563 painting by Pieter Brueghel.

Metropolis features a range of elaborate special effects and set designs, ranging from a huge gothic cathedral to a futuristic cityscape. In an interview, Fritz Lang reported that "the film was born from my first sight of the skyscrapers in New York in October 1924". He had visited New York City for the first time and remarked "I looked into the streets—the glaring lights and the tall buildings—and there I conceived Metropolis," although in actuality Lang and von Harbou had been at work on the idea for over a year. Describing his first impressions of the city, Lang said that "the buildings seemed to be a vertical sail, scintillating and very light, a luxurious backdrop, suspended in the dark sky to dazzle, distract and hypnotize". He added "The sight of Neuyork [sic] alone should be enough to turn this beacon of beauty into the center of a film..."

The appearance of the city in Metropolis is strongly informed by the Art Deco movement; however, it also incorporates elements from other traditions. Ingeborg Hoesterey described the architecture featured in Metropolis as eclectic, writing how its locales represent both "functionalist modernism [and] art deco" whilst also featuring "the scientist's archaic little house with its high-powered laboratory, the catacombs [and] the Gothic cathedral". The film's use of art deco architecture was highly influential, and has been reported to have contributed to the style's subsequent popularity in Europe and America. The New Babel Tower, for instance, has been inspired by Upper Silesian Tower in Poznań fairgrounds, which was recognized in Germany as a masterpiece of architecture.

Lang's visit to several Hollywood studios in the same 1924 trip also influenced the film in another way: Lang and producer Erich Pommer realized that to compete with the vertical integration of Hollywood, their next film would have to be bigger, broader, and better made than anything they had made before. Despite UFA's growing debt, Lang announced that Metropolis would be "the costliest and most ambitious picture ever."

The film drew heavily on biblical sources for several of its key set-pieces. During her first talk to the workers, Maria uses the story of the Tower of Babel to highlight the discord between the intellectuals and the workers. Additionally, a delusional Freder imagines the false-Maria as the Whore of Babylon, riding on the back of a many-headed dragon.

The name of the Yoshiwara club alludes to the famous red-light district of Tokyo.

Much of the plot line of Metropolis stems from the First World War and the culture of the Weimar Republic in Germany. Lang explores the themes of industrialization and mass production in his film; two developments that played a large role in the war. Other post-World War I themes that Lang includes in Metropolis include the Weimar view of American modernity, fascism, and communism.

== Production ==
=== Pre-production ===
Metropolis's screenplay was written by Thea von Harbou, a popular writer in Weimar Germany, jointly with Lang, her then-husband. The film's plot originated from a novel of the same title written by von Harbou for the sole purpose of being made into a film. The novel in turn drew inspiration from H.G. Wells, Mary Shelley and Villiers de l'Isle-Adam's works and other German dramas. The novel featured strongly in the film's marketing campaign, and was serialized in the journal Illustriertes Blatt in the run-up to its release. Von Harbou and Lang collaborated on the screenplay derived from the novel, and several plot points and thematic elements—including most of the references to magic and occultism present in the novel—were dropped.

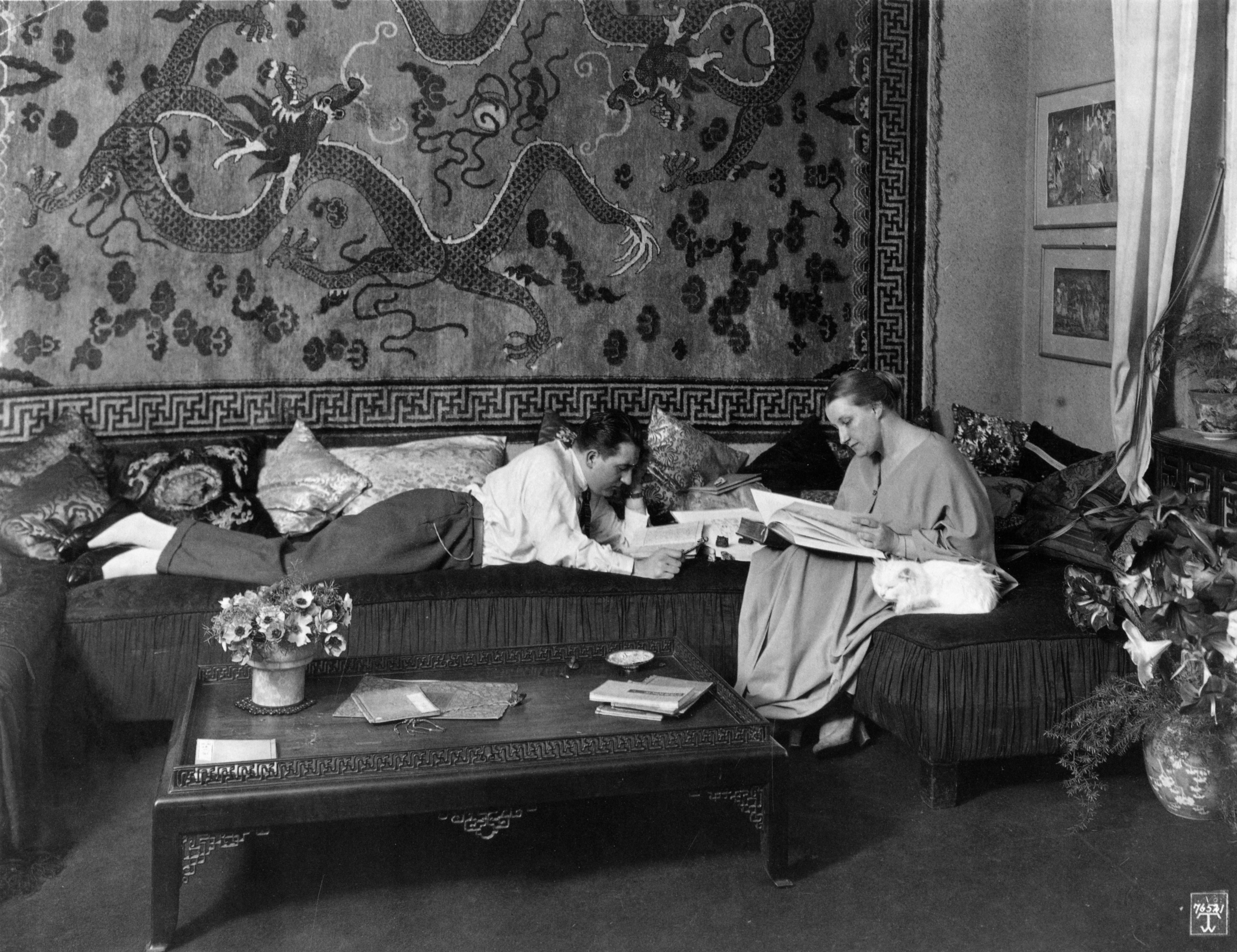
Lang and von Harbou in their Berlin apartment, about the time they were working on the scenario for Metropolis (ca 1923 or 1924)

The screenplay itself went through many rewrites, and at one point featured an ending where Freder flew to the stars; this plot element later became the basis for Lang's Woman in the Moon.

The period in which Metropolis is set has been interpreted in various ways. In the preface to the 1925 novel, Thea von Harbou states that the story takes place "at no particular place or time, neither in the present nor in the future." The 1963 American edition published by Ace Books, with a foreword by Forrest J Ackerman, placed the action in "The World of 2026 A.D.", roughly a century after the film was made. This date was subsequently repeated in later sources on the film. Giorgio Moroder's 1984 re-scored version likewise included a title card giving the year as 2026. Film historians Lotte Eisner and Paul M. Jensen instead placed the events around the year 2000. However, the film itself does not specify any year.

=== Filming ===
On 22 May 1925, Metropolis began principal photography with an initial budget of 1.5 million ℛ︁ℳ︁. Lang cast two unknowns with little film experience in the lead roles. Gustav Fröhlich (Freder) had worked in vaudeville and was originally employed as an extra on Metropolis before Thea von Harbou recommended him to Lang. Brigitte Helm (Maria) had been given a screen test by Lang after he met her on the set of Die Nibelungen, but would make her feature film debut with Metropolis. In the role of Joh Fredersen, Lang cast Alfred Abel, a noted stage and screen actor whom he had worked with on Dr. Mabuse the Gambler. Lang also cast his frequent collaborator Rudolph Klein-Rogge in the role of Rotwang. This was Klein-Rogge's fourth film with Lang, after Destiny, Dr. Mabuse the Gambler, and Die Nibelungen.

Shooting of the film was a draining experience for the actors involved due to the demands that Lang placed on them. For the scene where the workers' city was flooded, Helm and 500 children from the poorest districts of Berlin had to work for 14 days in a pool of water that Lang intentionally kept at a low temperature. Lang would frequently demand numerous re-takes, and took two days to shoot a simple scene where Freder collapses at Maria's feet; by the time Lang was satisfied with the footage he had shot, actor Gustav Fröhlich found he could barely stand. Other anecdotes involve Lang's insistence on using real fire for the climactic scene where the false Maria is burnt at the stake (which resulted in Helm's dress catching fire), and his ordering extras to throw themselves towards powerful jets of water when filming the flooding of the workers' city.

Helm recalled her experiences of shooting the film in a contemporary interview, saying that "the night shots lasted three weeks, and even if they did lead to the greatest dramatic moments—even if we did follow Fritz Lang's directions as though in a trance, enthusiastic and enraptured at the same time—I can't forget the incredible strain that they put us under. The work wasn't easy, and the authenticity in the portrayal ended up testing our nerves now and then. For instance, it wasn't fun at all when Grot drags me by the hair, to have me burned at the stake. Once I even fainted: during the transformation scene, Maria, as the android, is clamped in a kind of wooden armament, and because the shot took so long, I didn't get enough air."

Despite the hardships, Thea von Harbou recounted how the film set was paradise for the hundreds of poor, malnourished children used as extras. In 1927 in Metropolis Magazine, von Harbou describes their warm and clean rooms, time for play, and ample toys and hot meals four times a day. "No film ever had more enthusiastic and willing collaborators than these little children," she recalled, "always willing to dash into the chilly water [...] like perfect actors".

UFA invited several trade journal representatives and several film critics to see the film's shooting as parts of its promotion campaign.

Shooting lasted 17 months, with 310 shooting days and 60 shooting nights, and was finally completed on 30 October 1926. By the time shooting finished, the film's budget leapt to 5.3 million Reichsmarks, over three and a half times the original budget. Producer Erich Pommer had been fired during production.

=== Special effects ===
The effects expert Eugen Schüfftan created pioneering visual effects for Metropolis. Among the effects used are miniatures of the city, a camera on a swing, and most notably, the Schüfftan process, in which mirrors are used to create the illusion that actors are occupying miniature sets. This new technique was seen again just two years later in Alfred Hitchcock's film Blackmail (1929).

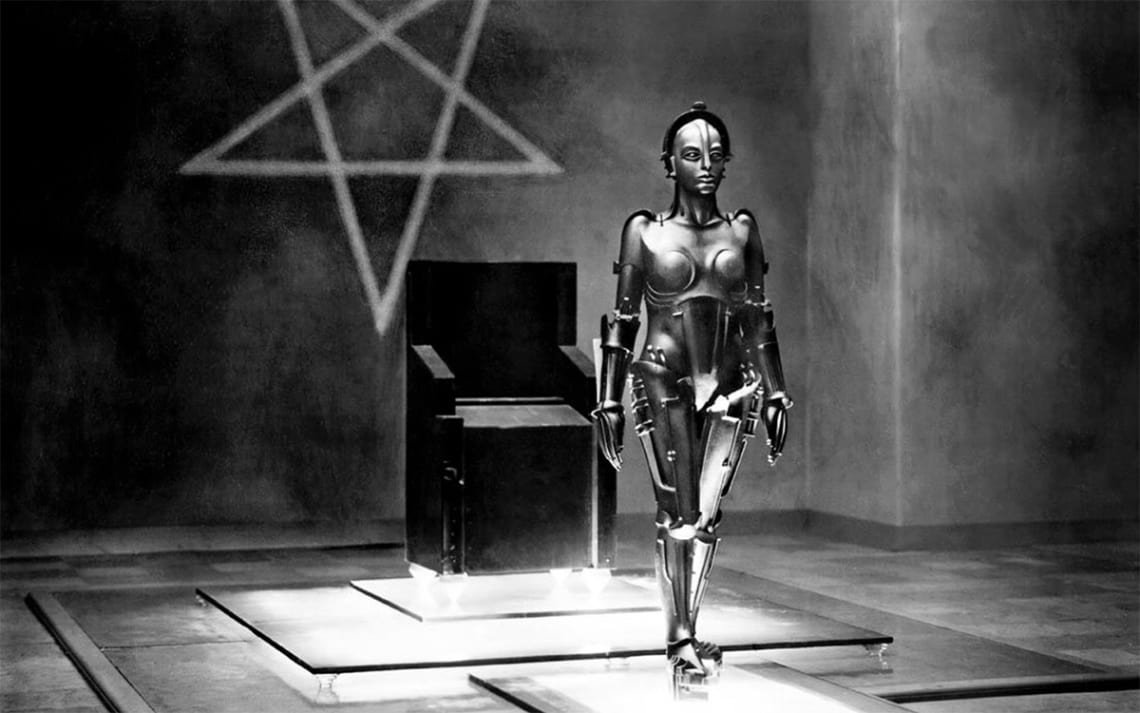
A film scene with the Maschinenmensch

The Maschinenmensch – the robot built by Rotwang to resurrect his lost love Hel – was created by sculptor Walter Schulze-Mittendorff. A whole-body plaster cast was taken of actress Brigitte Helm, and the costume was then constructed around it. A chance discovery of a sample of "plastic wood" (a pliable substance designed as wood-filler) allowed Schulze-Mittendorff to build a costume that would both appear metallic and allow a small amount of free movement. Helm sustained cuts and bruises while in character as the robot, as the costume was rigid and uncomfortable.

== Music ==
=== Original score ===
Gottfried Huppertz composed the film's score for a large orchestra. He drew inspiration from Richard Wagner and Richard Strauss, and combined a classical orchestral style with mild modernist touches to portray the film's massive industrial city of workers. Nestled within the original score were quotations of Claude Joseph Rouget de Lisle's "La Marseillaise" and the traditional "Dies Irae", the latter of which was matched to the film's apocalyptic imagery. Huppertz's music played a prominent role during the film's production; the composer often played piano on Lang's set to inform the actors' performances. The full orchestral version of Huppertz's score only accompanied the film once, at its original premiere. Sections of the score were recorded and released by the record label Vox.

The full score was not recorded until 2001, for the film's first comprehensive restoration, with Berndt Heller conducting the Rundfunksinfonieorchester Saarbrücken. It was released internationally on various DVD editions beginning in 2003.

In 2007, Huppertz's score was also played live by the VCS Radio Symphony, which accompanied the restored version of the film at Brenden Theatres in Vacaville, California. The score was also produced in a salon orchestration, which was performed for the first time in the United States in August 2007 by the Bijou Orchestra under the direction of Leo Najar as part of a German Expressionist film festival in Bay City, Michigan. The same forces also performed the work at the Traverse City Film Festival in Traverse City, Michigan in August 2009.

For the film's 2010 "complete" restoration premiere, Huppertz's score was performed live and subsequently re-recorded by the Berlin Radio Symphony Orchestra, conducted by Frank Strobel. This version was released internationally on various DVD and Blu-ray editions beginning in 2010.

=== Other scores ===
Various artists have created other scores for Metropolis:

- In 1975, the BBC provided an electronic score composed by William Fitzwater and Hugh Davies.
- In 1978, Australian composer Chris Neal created an experimental score for the film. It was performed live around Sydney throughout 1979.
- In 1984, Giorgio Moroder restored and produced the 80-minute 1984 re-release, which had a pop soundtrack written by Moroder and performed by Moroder, Pat Benatar, Bonnie Tyler, Jon Anderson, Adam Ant, Cycle V, Loverboy, Billy Squier, and Freddie Mercury.
- The same year, Belgian trio Autumn recorded an entire soundtrack for the film in a single day, titled Metropolis Soundtrack, and containing 18 instrumental synth tracks. However, Giorgio Moroder's version came first with its own soundtrack and acquisition of the rights for the film. Autumn's soundtrack was discarded and the band was forbidden to perform it again. The album was officially released in CD format on 2003.
- In 1991, the Club Foot Orchestra created an original score that was performed live with the film. It was also recorded for CD.
- In 1994, Montenegrin experimental rock musician Rambo Amadeus wrote his version of the musical score for Metropolis. At the screening of the film in Belgrade, the score was played by the Belgrade Philharmonic Orchestra.
- In 1998, the material was recorded and released on the album Metropolis B (tour-de-force).
- In 1996, the Degenerate Art Ensemble (then the Young Composers Collective) scored the film for chamber orchestra, performing it in various venues including a free outdoor concert and screening in 1997 in Seattle's Gasworks Park. The soundtrack was subsequently released on Un-Labeled Records.
- In 2000, Jeff Mills created a techno score for Metropolis which was released as an album. He also performed the score live at public screenings of the film.
- In 2004, Abel Korzeniowski created a score for Metropolis played live by a 90-piece orchestra and a choir of 60 voices and two soloists. The first performance took place at the Era Nowe Horyzonty Film Festival in Poland.
- In 2004, Ronnie Cramer produced a score and effects soundtrack for Metropolis that won two Aurora awards.
- The New Pollutants (Mister Speed and DJ Tr!p) has performed Metropolis Rescore live for festivals since 2005 and rescored to the 2010 version of the film for premiere at the 2011 Adelaide Film Festival.
- By 2010, the Alloy Orchestra had scored four different versions of the film, including Moroder's, and most recently for the American premiere of the 2010 restoration. A recording of Alloy's full score was commissioned by Kino Lorber, with the intention of it being issued on their remastered Blu-ray and DVD as an alternative soundtrack, but this was vetoed by Friedrich-Wilhelm-Murnau-Stiftung, which owns the copyright to the restoration and mandates that only their own score can accompany it. Alloy's score is available on its website and can be synchronised to the film independently.
- In 2012, Dieter Moebius was invited to perform music to the film. For that purpose, he produced pre-arranged tracks and samples, combined with live improvisation. He died in 2015, but the project was completed and released in 2016, as Musik für Metropolis.
- In 2014, the pianist/composer Dmytro Morykit created a new live piano score, which received a standing ovation from a sell-out audience at Wilton's Music Hall in London.
- Also in 2014, Spanish band Caspervek Trio premiered a new score at "La Galería Jazz" Vigo, with further performances in Budapest, Riga and Groningen. Metavari rescored Metropolis as a commission from Fort Wayne, Indiana's Cinema Center for Art House Theater Day 2016. The score was released worldwide on One Way Static Records for Record Store Day 2017 and distributed in the United States by Light in the Attic Records.
- In 2015, the Dallas Chamber Symphony commissioned an original film score from composer Brian Satterwhite for the Giorgio Moroder version of Metropolis. It premiered during a concert screening at Moody Performance Hall on October 13, 2015 with Richard McKay conducting.
- In 2017, the British electronic music duo Factory Floor were commissioned by London’s Science Museum to create and perform a new 150-minute live score for a screening of ‘‘Metropolis’’ at the museum’s IMAX cinema as part of its ‘‘Robots’’ exhibition programme, coinciding with the 90th anniversary of the film’s release. The score was subsequently developed into the studio album ‘‘A Soundtrack For A Film’’, released in 2018 on the duo’s own H/O/D Records imprint.Eede, Christian (9 February 2018). "LISTEN: New Factory Floor". The Quietus.Eede, Christian (14 August 2018). "Factory Floor To Release Film Score". The Quietus. The project generated the singles “Heart of Data” / “Babel” and “Transform” / “Wonder”, and was released as a four-LP box set to coincide with the anniversary of the film."Factory Floor announce A Soundtrack For A Film, their score to Fritz Lang's Metropolis". Fact. 13 August 2018.
- In February 2018, organist Brett Miller transcribed Gottfried Huppertz' original score as a benefit for JDRF live at the Trenton War Memorial. His performance was featured in March of that year in PBS's State of the Arts.
- In 2018, flautist Yael Acher "Kat" Modiano composed and performed a new score for a showing of the 2010 restoration at the United Palace in Upper Manhattan.
- In 2019, organist Nils Henrik Asheim composed and performed live an experimental "extended organ" score for a showing of the 2010 restoration at Stavanger Konserthus. Heavy modification of the organ was used to create a futuristic soundscape for the film.
- Also in 2019, the Bach Elgar Choir, under director Alexander Cann, presented a live soundtrack to the film, which included prepared improvised music as well as compositions by Ravel, Ives, Honegger, Canadian composer Harry Freedman, and excerpts from Huppertz's original soundtrack. The choir was joined by four instrumentalists (Chris Palmer, electric guitar, Evelyn Charlotte Joe, double bass, Connor Bennett, tenor saxophone, Krista Rhodes, keyboard).

== Release and reception ==
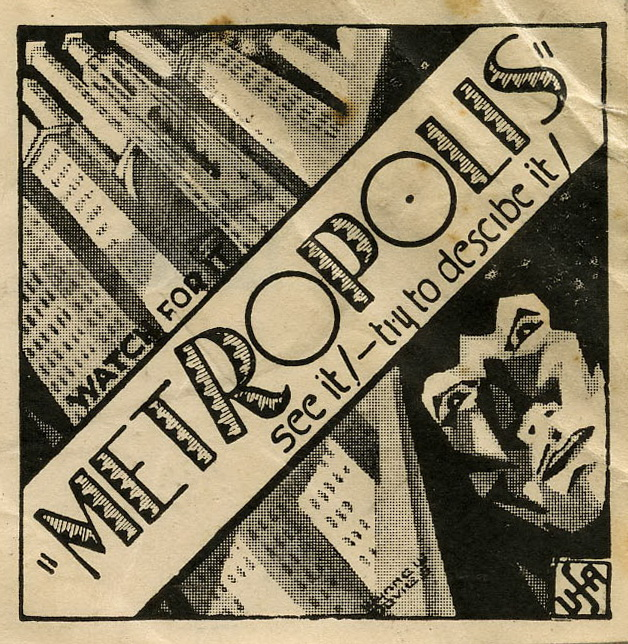
Advertisement for the film from New Zealand with misprint: (Try to descibe [sic] it)

Metropolis was distributed by Parufamet, a company formed in December 1925 by the American film studios Paramount Pictures and Metro Goldwyn Mayer to loan US $4 million to UFA. The film had its world premiere at the UFA-Palast am Zoo in Berlin on 10 January 1927, where the audience, including a critic from the Berliner Morgenpost, reacted to several of the film's most spectacular scenes with "spontaneous applause". However, others have suggested the premiere was met with muted applause interspersed with boos and hisses.

At the time of its German premiere, Metropolis had a length of 4,189 metres, which is approximately 153 minutes at 24 frames per second (fps). UFA's distribution deal with Paramount and MGM "entitled [them] to make any change [to films produced by UFA] they found appropriate to ensure profitability". Considering that Metropolis was too long and unwieldy, Parufamet commissioned American playwright Channing Pollock to write a simpler version of the film that could be assembled using the existing material. Pollock shortened the film dramatically, altered its intertitles and removed all references to the character of Hel, because the name sounded too similar to the English word Hell, thereby removing Rotwang's original motivation for creating his robot. Pollock said about the original film that it was "symbolism run such riot that people who saw it couldn't tell what the picture was about. ... I have given it my meaning." Lang's response to the re-editing of the film was to say "I love films, so I shall never go to America. Their experts have slashed my best film, Metropolis, so cruelly that I dare not see it while I am in England." The Hel storyline would be partially restored in Giorgio Moroder's 1984 version, and subsequent versions completely restored it.

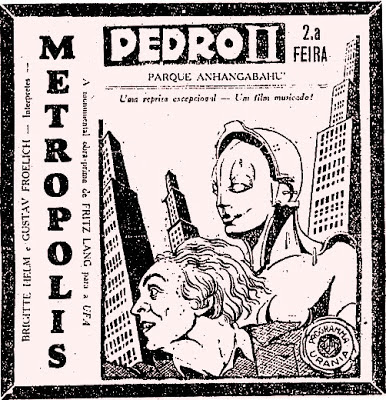
Reprise announcement of Fritz Lang's 'Metropolis' at Cine Pedro II, in Parque do Anhangabaú (São Paulo, Brazil, 18 July 1930)

In Pollock's cut, the film ran for 3,170 metres, or approximately 116 minutes—although a contemporary review in Variety of a showing in New York gave the running time as 107 minutes, and another source lists it at 105 minutes. This version of Metropolis premiered in the United States in March 1927, and was released, in a slightly different and longer version (128 minutes) in the United Kingdom around the same time with different title cards.

Alfred Hugenberg, a German nationalist businessman, cancelled UFA's debt to Paramount and Metro-Goldwyn-Mayer after taking charge of the company in April 1927, and chose to halt distribution in German cinemas of Metropolis in its original form. Hugenberg had the film cut down to a length of 3,241 metres (about 118 minutes), broadly along the lines of Pollock's edit, removing the film's perceived "inappropriate" communist subtext and religious imagery. Hugenberg's cut of the film was released in German cinemas in August 1927. Later, after demands for more cuts by Nazi censors, UFA distributed a still shorter version of the film (2,530 metres, 91 minutes) in 1936, and an English version of this cut was archived in the Museum of Modern Art (MoMA) film library in the 1930s. It was this version which was the basis of all versions of Metropolis until the later restorations. In 1986 it was recopied and returned to Germany to be the basis of the 1987 Munich Archive restoration.

=== Original reception ===
Despite the film's later reputation, some contemporary critics panned it. Variety's first review of the film in Berlin considered the scenario to be weak and felt that the artistic work had been wasted on the manufactured story although did acknowledge that nothing had been filmed like it before and its effect was positively overwhelming and that there were some exceptional performances. Critic Mordaunt Hall of The New York Times called it a "technical marvel with feet of clay". A review by H.G. Wells dated 17 April 1927 accused it of "foolishness, cliché, platitude, and muddlement about mechanical progress and progress in general". He faulted Metropolis for its premise that automation created drudgery rather than relieving it, wondered who was buying the machines' output if not the workers, and found parts of the story derivative of Shelley's Frankenstein, Karel Čapek's R.U.R., and his own The Sleeper Awakes. Wells called Metropolis "quite the silliest film", but the New York Herald Tribune called it "a weird and fascinating picture".

In The New Yorker Oliver Claxton called Metropolis "unconvincing and overlong", faulting much of the plot as "laid on with a terrible Teutonic heaviness, and an unnecessary amount of philosophizing in the beginning" that made the film "as soulless as the city of its tale". He also called the acting "uninspired with the exception of Brigitte Helm". Nevertheless, Claxton wrote that "the setting, the use of people and their movement, and various bits of action stand out as extraordinary and make it nearly an obligatory picture." Other critics considered the film a remarkable achievement that surpassed even its high expectations, praising its visual splendour and ambitious production values.

A month after their first review, Variety founder Sime Silverman reviewed the film in New York and considered the film to have mass appeal but called it "a weird story, visionary all of the time, without any degree of unusual imagination and offtimes monotonous".

Nazi propagandist Joseph Goebbels was impressed with the film's message of social justice. In a 1928 speech, he said, "the political bourgeoisie is about to leave the stage of history. In its place advance the oppressed producers of the head and hand, the forces of Labor, to begin their historical mission". Shortly after the Nazis came to power, Goebbels told Lang that, on the basis of their seeing Metropolis together years before, Hitler had said that he wanted Lang to make Nazi films.

German cultural critic Siegfried Kracauer later wrote of Metropolis, "The Americans relished its technical excellence; the English remained aloof; the French were stirred by a film which seemed to them a blend of [composer] Wagner and [armaments manufacturer] Krupp, and on the whole an alarming sign of Germany's vitality."

Lang later expressed dissatisfaction with the film. In an interview with Peter Bogdanovich in Who the Devil Made It: Conversations with Legendary Film Directors, published in 1998, he expressed his reservations:

The main thesis was Mrs. Von Harbou's, but I am at least 50 percent responsible because I did it. I was not so politically minded in those days as I am now. You cannot make a social-conscious picture in which you say that the intermediary between the hand and the brain is the heart. I mean, that's a fairy tale—definitely. But I was very interested in machines. Anyway, I didn't like the picture—thought it was silly and stupid—then, when I saw the astronauts: what else are they but part of a machine? It's very hard to talk about pictures—should I say now that I like Metropolis because something I have seen in my imagination comes true, when I detested it after it was finished?

In his profile of Lang, which introduced the interview, Bogdanovich suggested that Lang's distaste for his film also stemmed from the Nazi Party's fascination with it. Von Harbou became a member of the Party in 1933. She and Lang divorced the following year. Lang later moved to the United States to escape the Nazis, while von Harbou stayed in Germany and continued to write state-approved films.

=== Later acclaim ===
According to Roger Ebert, "Metropolis is one of the great achievements of the silent era, a work so audacious in its vision and so angry in its message that it is, if anything, more powerful today than when it was made." Leonard Maltin's Movie Guide's entry on the film reads, "Heavy going at times but startling set design and special effects command attention throughout."

Colin Greenland reviewed Metropolis for Imagine magazine, and stated that "It's a measure of the sheer power of Lang's vision that it survives this heavy-handed cosmetic modernizing quite intact. Inspired by his first sight of Manhattan, Metropolis is a dark dream of the city of 2026, where the idle rich live in penthouses and play in rooftop pleasure gardens while the faceless workers toil in the machine caverns far, far below."

The film has an approval rating of 97% on Rotten Tomatoes based on 126 reviews, with an average rating of 9.1/10. The website's critical consensus reads, "A visually awe-inspiring science fiction classic from the silent era." In Metacritic, which uses a weighted average, assigned the film a score of 98 out of 100 based on 14 critics, indicating "universal acclaim". It also ranked 12th in Empire magazine's "The 100 Best Films Of World Cinema" in 2010. The 2002 version was awarded the New York Film Critics Circle Awards "Special Award" for the restoration. In 2012, in correspondence with the Sight & Sound Poll, the British Film Institute called Metropolis the 35th-greatest film of all time. In the 2022 version of the poll, Metropolis fell slightly to 67th place.

Lane Roth in Film Quarterly called it a "seminal film" because of its concerns with the "profound impact technological progress has on man's social and spiritual progress" and concluded that "ascendancy of artifact over nature is depicted not as liberating man, but as subjugating and corrupting him". Martin Scorsese included it on a list of "39 Essential Foreign Films for a Young Filmmaker." In 2013, The Guardian ranked Metropolis as the 6th best silent film of all time.

Exploring the dramatic production background and historical importance of the film's complex political context in The American Conservative, film historian Cristobal Catalan suggests "Metropolis is a passionate call, and equally a passionate caution, for social change". Peter Bradshaw noted that the Maschinenmensch based on Maria is "a brilliant eroticisation and fetishisation of modern technology".

In a list of the 100 most important German films, compiled in 1994 by the Association of German Cinémathèques, Metropolis was placed at #8. The film was included by the Vatican in a list of important films compiled in 1995, under the category of "Art".

== Restorations ==
Poster for the 2002 restored version, featuring the Maschinenmensch

The original premiere cut of Metropolis has been lost, and for decades the film could be seen only in heavily truncated edits that lacked nearly a quarter of the original length. This was the case even though cinematographer Karl Freund followed the usual practice of the time of securing three printable takes of each shot in order to create three camera negatives which could be edited for striking prints. Two of these negatives were destroyed when Paramount reedited the film for the US market and the UK market. UFA itself cut the third negative for the August 1927 release. But over the years, various elements of footage have been rediscovered.

=== East German version (1972) ===
Between 1968 and 1972, the Staatliches Filmarchiv der DDR, with the help of film archives from around the world, put together a version of Metropolis which restored some scenes and footage, but the effort was hobbled by a lack of a guide, such as an original script, to determine what, exactly, was in the original version.

=== Giorgio Moroder version (1984) ===
In 1984, a new restoration and edit of the film, running 83 minutes, was made by Italian music producer Giorgio Moroder, who paid $200,000 for the rights, outbidding his Cat People collaborator David Bowie. Although Moroder initially intended only to create a new soundtrack, he was surprised by the lack of a definitive print, and expanded his project to a major reconstruction. Moroder's version, which was made in consultation with the Munich Film Archive and its archivist, Enno Patalas, was tinted to emphasise the different moods and locations in the film. It also featured additional special effects, replaced intertitles of character dialogue with subtitles and incorporated a soundtrack featuring songs Moroder composed, produced and recorded with popular artists such as Freddie Mercury, Bonnie Tyler, Pat Benatar, Adam Ant and Jon Anderson. It was the first serious attempt made at restoring Metropolis to Lang's original vision, and until the restorations in 2001 and 2010, it was the most complete version of the film commercially available. The shorter run time was due to the extensive use of subtitles for spoken lines instead of title cards, a faster frame rate than the original, and the fact that large amounts of footage were still missing at the time.

Moroder's version of Metropolis generally received poor reviews. Moroder responded to the critics who lambasted his production for not being faithful to the original in The New York Times: "I didn't touch the original because there is no original." The film was nominated for two Raspberry Awards, Worst Original Song for Mercury's "Love Kills" and Worst Musical Score for Moroder. However, Bonnie Tyler was nominated for Grammy Award for Best Female Rock Vocal Performance at the 27th Grammy Awards for "Here She Comes".

In August 2011, after years of the Moroder version being unavailable on video in any format due to music licensing problems, it was announced that Kino International had managed to resolve the situation, and the film was to be released on Blu-ray and DVD in November. In addition, the film enjoyed a limited theatrical re-release.

In 2012, the Academy of Science Fiction, Fantasy and Horror Films gave Giorgio Moroder Presents Metropolis a Saturn Award for Best DVD/Blu-Ray Special Edition Release.

==== Soundtrack ====
1984 soundtrack track listing
No.	Title	Writer(s)	Producer(s)	Length
1.	"Love Kills" (Freddie Mercury)	Giorgio Moroder; Freddie Mercury	Moroder; Mercury; Reinhold Mack	4:29
2.	"Here's My Heart" (Pat Benatar)	Moroder; Pete Bellotte	Moroder; Neil Giraldo	4:54
3.	"Cage of Freedom" (Jon Anderson)	Moroder; Bellotte	Moroder	4:40
4.	"Blood from a Stone" (Cycle V – a.k.a. Frank Dimino)	Moroder; Bellotte	Moroder	3:37
5.	"The Legend of Babel" (Giorgio Moroder)	Moroder	Moroder	3:55
6.	"Here She Comes" (Bonnie Tyler)	Moroder; Bellotte	Moroder	3:48
7.	"Destruction" (Loverboy)	Moroder; Bellotte	Moroder; Paul Dean	4:09
8.	"On Your Own" (Billy Squier)	Moroder; Squier	Moroder	4:09
9.	"What's Going On" (Adam Ant)	Moroder; Bellotte	Moroder	3:49
10.	"Machines" (Giorgio Moroder)	Moroder	Moroder	4:11

==== Charts ====
Chart (1984)	Peak position	Ref.
AUS Australia Kent Music Report	69	
Eurocharts Top 100 European Top 100 Albums	31	
Germany GfK Entertainment charts	50	
Italy Billboard Hits of the World	13	
Swiss Charts Swiss Hitparade	30	
US Billboard Album Charts	110	
US Billboard Rock Albums	21	
US Cash Box Top 200	112	

=== Munich Archive version (1987) ===
The moderate commercial success of the Moroder version inspired Enno Patalas, the archivist of the Munich Film Archive, to make an exhaustive attempt to restore the movie in 1986. Starting from the version in the Museum of Modern Art collection, this version took advantage of new acquisitions and newly discovered German censorship records of the original intertitles, as well as the musical score and other materials from the estate of composer Gottfried Huppertz. The Munich restoration also used newly rediscovered still photographs to represent scenes that were still missing from the film. The Munich version was 9,840 feet, or 109 minutes long.

=== Restored Authorized Edition (2001) ===
In 1998, Friedrich-Wilhelm-Murnau-Stiftung commissioned film preservationist Martin Koerber to create a "definitive" restoration of Metropolis by expanding on the Munich version. Previously unknown sections of the film were discovered in film museums and archives around the world, including a nitrate original camera negative from the Bundesarchiv-Filmarchiv, as well as nitrate prints from the George Eastman House, the British Film Institute and the Cineteca Italiana. These original film elements, digitally cleaned and repaired to remove defects, were used to assemble the film. Newly written intertitles were used to explain missing scenes.

The new restoration premiered on 15 February 2001 at the Berlin Film Festival, with a new score by Bernd Schultheis, performed live by the Rundfunk-Sinfonieorchester Berlin. For theatrical and DVD release, it featured a new recording of Huppertz's original score performed by a 65-piece orchestra. The running time is 124 minutes at 24 fps, and it was released internationally on various DVD editions beginning in 2003. This version of Metropolis was added to UNESCO's Memory of the World International Register in 2001, recognising it as a cultural work of global importance. It was the first film to achieve this status.

=== The Complete Metropolis (2010) ===
On 1 July 2008, film experts in Berlin announced that a 16 mm reduction negative of the original cut had been discovered in the archives of the Museo del Cine in Buenos Aires, Argentina. The negative was a safety reduction made in the 1960s or 1970s from a 35 mm positive of Lang's original version, which an Argentinian film distributor had obtained in advance of arranging theatrical engagements in South America. The safety reduction was intended to safeguard the contents in case the original's flammable nitrate film stock was destroyed. The negative was passed to a private collector, an art foundation and finally the Museo del Cine.

The print was investigated by the Argentinian film collector/historian and TV presenter Fernando Martín Peña, along with Paula Felix-Didier, the head of the museum, after Peña heard an anecdote from a cinema club manager expressing surprise at the length of a print of Metropolis he had viewed. The print was indeed Lang's full original, with about 25 minutes of footage, around one-fifth of the film, that had not been seen since 1927.

Under the auspices of the Friedrich-Wilhelm-Murnau-Stiftung, Berlin's Deutsche Kinemathek and Museo del Cine, a group of experts, including Anke Wilkening, Martin Koerber, and Frank Strobel began combining the discovered footage with the existing footage from the 2001 restoration. A problem was that the Argentinian footage was in poor condition and had many scratches, streaks and changes in brightness. The group was able to repair some of this damage using digital technology that had not yet been developed in 2001. The reconstruction of the film with the new footage was once again accompanied by the original music score, including Huppertz's handwritten notes, which acted as the key resource in determining the places in which the restored footage would go. Since the Argentinian print was a complete version of the original, some scenes from the 2001 restoration were put in different places and the tempo of the original editing was restored.

In 2005, Australian historian and politician Michael Organ had examined a print of the film in the National Film Archive of New Zealand. Organ discovered that the print contained scenes missing from other copies of the film. After hearing of the discovery of the Argentine print of the film and the restoration project, Organ contacted the German restorers; the New Zealand print contained 11 missing scenes and featured some brief pieces of footage that were used to restore damaged sections of the Argentine print. It is believed that the New Zealand and Argentine prints were from the same master. The discovered footage was used in the restoration project. The Argentine print was in poor condition and required considerable restoration before it was re-premiered in February 2010. Two short sequences, depicting a monk preaching and a fight between Rotwang and Fredersen, were damaged beyond repair. Title cards describing the action were inserted by the restorers to compensate. The Argentine print revealed new scenes that enriched the film's narrative complexity. The characters of Josaphat, the Thin Man, and 11811 appear throughout the film and the character Hel is reintroduced.

The new restoration premiered 12 February 2010 at the Berlin Friedrichstadtpalast. Huppertz's score was performed by the Berlin Radio Symphony Orchestra, conducted by Frank Strobel, who also re-recorded it for theatrical and home video release. The performance was a gala screening as part of the 60th Berlinale and had several simultaneous screenings. It was also shown on an outdoor screen at Berlin's Brandenburg Gate, as well as at the Alte Oper in Frankfurt am Main. The Brandenburg Gate screening was also telecast live by the Arte network. The North American premiere took place at the TCM Classic Film Festival at Mann's Chinese Theatre in Los Angeles on 25 April 2010. The restoration has a running time of 148 minutes (nearly 2.5 hours) and was released internationally in various DVD and Blu-ray editions.

== Copyright status ==
The American copyright for Metropolis lapsed in 1953, which later led to a proliferation of versions being released on video. Along with other foreign-made works, the film's U.S. copyright was restored in 1996 by the Uruguay Round Agreements Act; the constitutionality of this copyright extension was challenged, but was upheld by the U.S. Supreme Court in 2012's Golan v. Holder. This had the effect of restoring the copyright in the work as of 1 January 1996.

Under current U.S. copyright law, Metropolis entered the public domain on 1 January 2023; the U.S. copyright limit for films of its age is 95 years from publication per the Copyright Term Extension Act.

Under current EU copyright law, the film will remain under copyright in Germany and the rest of the European Union until the end of 2046, 70 years after Fritz Lang's death. (Note: § 65 co-authors, cinematographic works, musical composition with words (2) In the case of film works and works similar to cinematographic works, copyright expires seventy years after the death of the last survivor of the following persons: the principal director, author of the screenplay, author of the dialogue, the composer of music for the cinematographic music. The people considered under this German law are director Fritz Lang (died 1976), writer Thea von Harbou (died 1954), and possibly score composer Gottfried Huppertz (died 1937).) Note this only applies to the film itself: the separate, newly-recorded scores for the restored versions have their own copyrights from the date of publication on home video in 2003 and 2010. In addition, portions of both scores were supplemented with music by several living composers, so copyright in the whole subsists until 70 years after their deaths.

== Adaptations ==
- A 1989 musical theatre adaptation, Metropolis, was performed on the West End in London and in Chicago. The play's music was written by Joe Brooks and the lyrics by Dusty Hughes.
- In December 2016, it was announced that Sam Esmail would adapt the film into a television miniseries. In March 2022, Apple TV+ gave the production a series order, with Esmail writing and directing the series and also serving as showrunner. In February 2023, it was reported that Briana Middleton was cast in the lead role. In June 2023, the producers Universal Content Productions stated that the series would not be moving forward due to the WGA strike and rising development costs.
- The Metropolis manga, sometimes referred to as Osamu Tezuka's Metropolis or Robotic Angel, has parallels with the film. Mangaka Osamu Tezuka has said that he saw a single still image of the movie in a magazine at the time of creating his manga. The manga has been adapted into a 2001 anime feature film of the same name. The adaptation incorporated more elements of the 1927 film.

== In popular culture ==
Following are mentions of the film in popular culture:

- David Bowie's 1974 album Diamond Dogs and its following tour were inspired by the film, with Amanda Lear recalling "He rented the film and ran it over and over again in his house. And that's where Diamond Dogs came from – the whole staging and album and everything, Bowie got from Metropolis".
- The cover of 1970s British rock band Be Bop Deluxe's 1977 album Live! In the Air Age is a still from the film.
- The rock band Motörhead's album Overkill contains the song "Metropolis", which was written by Lemmy, the band's lead singer and bassist, after he saw the film in 1979. It was written to fill space on the album which was short.
- When designing the character of C-3PO for Star Wars, Ralph McQuarrie was inspired by the aesthetic of the Maschinenmensch, the two bearing a striking resemblance to one another.
- Queen's 1984 music video for song "Radio Ga Ga" uses imagery and clips from the movie. The four members of the band are inserted into clips, for example the face of Freddie Mercury is briefly superimposed over the robot's face. The video ends with the caption "Thanks to Metropolis". Mercury also contributed the song "Love Kills" to the soundtrack of the Moroder version of the film.
- Madonna's 1989 music video "Express Yourself" pays homage to the film.
- Haddaway's 1993 music video "Life" was inspired by the film. In a May 2021 online interview in The Weekly Show with David J. Maloney, Haddaway said the idea for the video came from himself after watching Queen's video for song "Radio Ga Ga", which contained some clips from the film.
- Whitney Houston's 1994 music video "Queen of the Night" also pays homage to Lang's film, with Houston wearing a metallic costume inspired by the Maschinenmensch. Likewise, the 1992 blockbuster The Bodyguard also uses clips from the movie, when Houston was singing this song at a night club and they appear on a multi-screen in the background.
- The 1996 DC Comics graphic novel Superman's Metropolis is an Elseworlds story that places Superman in the world of Fritz Lang's Metropolis.
- In 1998, American nu metal band System of a Down released a music video called "Sugar", which features footage from Metropolis.
- Janelle Monáe based both her concept albums on the original film, including her EP, Metropolis: Suite I (The Chase), released in mid-2007, and The ArchAndroid, released in 2009. The latter also included an homage to Metropolis on its cover, with the film version of the Tower of Babel among the remainder of the city. The albums follow the adventures of Monáe's alter-ego and robot, Cindi Mayweather, as a messianic figure to the android community of Metropolis.
- Lady Gaga has made a series of references to Lang's film in some videos for her songs. Visual allusions to the film are noted most predominantly in the music videos for "Alejandro" (2010), "Born This Way" (2011), and "Applause" (2013).
- Beyoncé has also made a series of references to Lang's film, wearing costumes inspired by Maschinenmensch. Firstly, during her performance at the 2007 BET Awards and later at the 2023 Renaissance World Tour and the tour's documentary concert film Renaissance: A Film by Beyoncé.
- The 2012 EP Metropolis Part I by the electronic music trio The M Machine is a conceptual work inspired by the film.
- The Brazilian metal band Sepultura named their 2013 album The Mediator Between Head and Hands Must Be the Heart after a quote from the film.
- The League of Extraordinary Gentlemen graphic novel Nemo: The Roses of Berlin is set in Metropolis in 1941, in the midst of Adenoid Hynkel (from The Great Dictator)'s Nazi-like regime.
- The 2014 music video "Digital Witness" by St. Vincent in collaboration with Chino Moya presents "a surreal, pastel-hued future" in which she is a stand-in for Maria.
- In the video game Layers of Fear 2, parts of the chapter "Living Mannequins" take direct inspiration from the movie.
- "Monsters in Metropolis," a 2021 Doctor Who audio play released by Big Finish Productions, features the Ninth Doctor battling a Cyberman on the set of the film and includes many references both to the film itself and its legacy.

== See also ==
- List of cult films
- List of dystopian films
- List of films considered the best
- List of films featuring surveillance
- List of German films of 1919–1932
- List of incomplete or partially lost films
- List of rediscovered films
- 1927 in science fiction
- C-3PO, the humanoid robot character in the franchise Star Wars.

== Bibliography ==
- Bukatman, Scott (1997). Blade Runner. London: BFI modern classics, British Film Institute. ISBN 0-85170-623-1.
- Ebert, Roger (1985). Roger Ebert's Movie Home Companion: 400 Films on Cassette, 1980-85. Andrews, McMeel & Parker. ISBN 978-0-8362-6209-4.
- Eisner, Lotte (1986). Fritz Lang. Massachusetts: Da Capo Press. ISBN 978-0-306-80271-3.
- Grant, Barry Keith, ed. (2003). Fritz Lang: Interviews. Conversations with Filmmakers Series. Jackson, Mississippi: University Press of Mississippi. ISBN 9781578065776.
- Jensen, Paul M. (1969). The cinema of Fritz Lang. New York: A. S. Barnes. ISBN 0302020020.
- Kaplan, E. Ann (1981). Fritz Lang: A Guide to References and Resources. Boston: G.K. Hall & Co. ISBN 978-0-8161-8035-6.
- Kreimeier, Klaus (1999). The UFA Story: A History of Germany's Greatest Film Company, 1918–1945. Berkeley: University of California Press. ISBN 0-520-22069-2.
- Kracauer, Siegfried (1947). From Caligari to Hitler: A Psychological History of German Film. Princeton, New Jersey: Princeton University Press. ISBN 0-691-02505-3.
- Magid, Annette M. (Summer 2006). "Better than the Book: Fritz Lang's Interpretation of Thea von Harbou's Metropolis" (PDF). Spaces of Utopia. No. 2. Universidade do Porto. pp. 129–149. ISSN 1646-4729.
- McGilligan, Patrick (1997). Fritz Lang: The Nature of the Beast. New York: St. Martin's Press. ISBN 978-0-312-19454-3.
- Michael, Mick St. (2004). Madonna 'Talking': Madonna in Her Own Words. Omnibus Press. ISBN 1-84449-418-7.
- Minden, Michael; Bachmann, Holger (2002). Fritz Lang's Metropolis: Cinematic Visions of Technology and Fear. New York: Camden House. ISBN 978-1-57113-146-1.
- Mok, Michel (May 1930). "New Ideas Sweep Movie Studios". Popular Science. 116 (5). Popular Science Publishing. ISSN 0161-7370.
- Roth, Lane (1978). ""Metropolis", The Lights Fantastic: Semiotic Analysis of Lighting Codes in Relation to Character and Theme". Film Quarterly. 6 (4): 342–346. JSTOR 43795693.
- Russell, Tim (2007). Fill 'er Up!: The Great American Gas Station. Minneapolis: Voyageur Press. ISBN 978-0-7603-2871-2.
- Schoenbaum, David (1997). Hitler's Social Revolution: Class and Status in Nazi Germany 1933–1939. London: WW Norton and Company. ISBN 0-393-31554-1.
- Stoicea, Gabriela (2006). "Re-Producing the Class and Gender Divide: Fritz Lang's Metropolis". Women in German Yearbook. 22: 21–42. doi:10.1353/wgy.2006.0012. JSTOR 20688260. S2CID 143458810.
- White, Susan M. (1995). The Cinema of Max Ophuls: Magisterial Vision and the Figure of Woman. Columbia University Press. ISBN 978-0-231-10113-4.
- Wilson, John (2005). The Official Razzie Movie Guide: Enjoying the Best of Hollywood's Worst. Grand Central Publishing. ISBN 0-446-69334-0.
- Hoesterey, Ingeborg (2001). Pastiche: Cultural Memory in Art, Film, Literature. Bloomington, Indiana: Indiana University Press. ISBN 978-0-253-21445-4.
