= A Man with Principles? =

1943 film directed by Géza von Bolváry

A Man With Principles?
- German DVD cover
- German: Ein Mann mit Grundsätzen?
- Directed by: Géza von Bolváry
- Written by: Maria von der Osten-Sacken
- Produced by: Viktor von Struwe
- Starring: Hans Söhnker; Elfie Mayerhofer; Sigrid Becker; Ursula Herking
- Cinematography: Reimar Kuntze
- Edited by: Alice Ludwig
- Music by: Michael Jary
- Production company: Terra Film
- Distributed by: Deutsche Filmvertriebs
- Release date: 11 November 1943
- Running time: 93 minutes
- Country: Germany
- Language: German

A Man With Principles? (German: Ein Mann mit Grundsätzen?) is a 1943 German comedy film directed by Géza von Bolváry and starring Hans Söhnker, Elfie Mayerhofer, and Sigrid Becker.

== Synopsis ==
A young female chemist moves to Hamburg for research where she encounters a handsome, but extremely sexist male colleague. Eventually she manages to change his attitude towards women.

== Cast ==
- Hans Söhnker as Dr. Hans Winhold
- Elfie Mayerhofer as Christa Weiden
- Sigrid Becker as Karoline Paul
- Ursula Herking as Frl. Budensieck
- Maria Koppenhöfer as Mrs.Senator Petersen
- Lola Müthel as Isabella Brandt
- Gerda Maria Terno as Dr.Lisa v. Jennisch
- Curt Ackermann as Dr. Schumann, Chemiker
- Karl Günther as Prof. Sprenger, Hans' Chef
- Fritz Odemar as Friedrich Weiden, Christls Vater
- Rudolf Schündler as Peter Ordner, der "Verlobte" Christls
- Ernst Waldow as Dr. Kurt Drews, Lawyer
- Wolfgang Dohnberg as Ein Zuhörer der Konferenz
- Karl Etlinger as Ein Professor, ehemaliger Lehrer Christls
- Charles Francois as Ein Kellner im "Yokohama"
- Bernhard Goetzke as Ein Zuhörer der Konferenz
- Käthe Jöken-König as Das Mädchen bei Frau Senator Petersen
- Lisa Lesco as Die Sängerin im "Yokohama"
- Alfred Maack as Der Nachtwächter im Institut
- Edith Meinhard as Das Mädchen bei Christl im Hotel Columbus
- Justus Ott as Palli, der Kapitän, der die Trauung vornimmt
- Hellmuth Passarge as Ein Reisender auf dem Bahnhof und ein Schiffssteward
- Paul Rehkopf as Ein Zuhörer der Konferenz
- Annemarie Schäfer as Eine Laborantin
- Michael von Newlinsky as Ein Reisender im Zugabteil
