= Ernst Schröder (actor) =

German actor

- Born: 27 January 1915; Herne, Prussia, Germany
- Died: 26 July 1994 (aged 79); Berlin, Germany
- Years active: 1934–1992
- Spouse(s): Inge Thiesfeld (1937-1945) (divorced) (2 children); Gesa Ferck (1946-?) (1 child)

Ernst Schröder (27 January 1915 – 26 July 1994) was a popular German theatre, film and TV actor.

== Life ==
Born in Herne, Schröder began his acting career at the nearby Bochum Theatre in 1934, under the director Saladin Schmitt. He worked there until 1936, also working as assistant director and Stage Designer. After working at Bielefeld and Wuppertal, he moved to the Schiller Theatre in Berlin in 1938, which became his artistic home and the location of his greatest triumphs, particularly after the Second World War.

During the war he served briefly in the army, was wounded, and returned to the Schiller Theatre in 1942. When in 1944 the theatre was closed, he returned to serve in the army, and ended the war in Italy as a prisoner. He returned to the theatre in 1946 and rapidly re-established his reputation.

He was a member of the jury at the 7th Berlin International Film Festival in 1957.

He was considered one of the greatest character actors of the German theatre, enjoying larger than life roles. He was frequently compared with the pre-war star Heinrich George. In addition, he frequently acted in Zurich and Munich. Although he concentrated on stage work, both as actor and director, he occasionally appeared in film roles, most notably as German General Hans von Salmuth in the 1962 film The Longest Day.

He achieved broader popularity in the 1970s, appearing more frequently on television, particularly in crime shows like Derrick and Der Alte.

In 1981, he staged a production of Shakespeare's King Lear at the Bad Hersfeld Festival. At the end of the 1980s he returned to television in the role of 'Lauritz Lorentz' in the series of Lorentz & Söhne (Lorentz and Sons).

In 1991–92, he appeared as the narrator in a dramatised radio version of The Lord of the Rings.

Throughout his career, Schröder also dubbed the voices of popular English-speaking actors into German. Amongst others, he provided the voices for Charles Boyer, James Cagney, William Conrad, Rex Harrison, Herbert Lom, Spencer Tracy and Peter Ustinov.

== Personal life ==
In 1980, his daughter, the actress Christiane Schröder (18 January 1942 – 17 September 1980), killed herself at Golden Gate Bridge in San Francisco.

Schröder killed himself on 26 July 1994, at the age of 79. He had cancer at the time of his death.

== Theatre ==
Year	Title	Role	Author	Director	Notes
1937–1938	Clavigo	Clavigo	Johann Wolfgang von Goethe		
1938–1939	Konig Heinrich IV	Prinz Heinrich	William Shakespeare	Ernst Legal	
1946	Die Räuber	Karl Moor	Friedrich Schiller	Walter Felsenstein	
1946	Fraulein Julie		August Strindberg	Ernst Schröder	
1946	Boubouroche		Georges Courteline	Ernst Schröder	
1948	Caligula	Title role	Albert Camus		
1950	Don Carlos	Domingo	Friedrich Schiller	Fritz Kortner	
1952	Urfaust	Mephisto	Goethe	Willi Schmidt	
1953	Die Räuber	Karl Moor	Friedrich Schiller	Hans Lietzau	
1953	Tartuffe	Title role	Molière	O.F. Schuh	
1954	Der zerbrochene Krug	Dorfrichter Adam	Heinrich von Kleist	O.F. Schuh	
1954	Warten auf Godot	Wladimir	Samuel Beckett	Fritz Kortner	with Heinz Rühmann
1958	Richard III	Title role	Shakespeare	Leopold Lindtberg	
1958	Biedermann und die Brandstifter	Schmitzi	Max Frisch	Oskar Wälterlin	
1961	Die Echten Sedemunds	Der alte Sedemund	Ernst Barlach	Hans Lietzau	
1961	Andorra	Lehrer	Max Frisch	Kurt Hirschfeld	World premiere
1962	Graf Öderland	Prosecutor	Max Frisch	Hans Lietzau	
1963	Herkules und der Stall des Augias		Friedrich Dürrenmatt		World premiere
1964	Christian Maske, 1913		Carl Sternheim		
1964	Marat/Sade	Marquis de Sade	Peter Weiss	Konrad Swinarski	World premiere
1965	Die Wanze	Prisipkin	Wladimir Majakowski	Konrad Swinarski	
1966	Faust II	Mephisto	Goethe	Ernst Schröder	
1967	Endspiel	Hamm	Samuel Beckett	Samuel Beckett	
1967	Die Wiedertaufer	Bockelson	Friedrich Dürrenmatt	Werner Düggelin	World premiere
1968	Die Trauung	Vater	Witold Gombrowicz	Ernst Schröder	
1973	Lear	Title role	Edward Bond	Hans Lietzau	
1983	Über allen Gipfeln ist Ruh	Moritz Meister	Thomas Bernhard	Kurt Hübner	Volksbühne production

== Filmography ==
Year	Title	Role	Director	Also Starring	Notes
1940	Friedrich Schiller – The Triumph of a Genius	Student Zumsteg	Herbert Maisch	Horst Caspar and Heinrich George	
1940	Fahrt ins Leben	Seekadett Christian Wagner	Bernd Hofmann	Hedwig Bleibtreu	
1941	Ohm Krüger	Adrian Krüger	Hans Steinhoff	Emil Jannings	
1942	Der große Schatten	Dr. Martin Scholz	Paul Verhoeven	Heinrich George and Heidemarie Hatheyer	
1944	The Degenhardts	Jochem Degenhardt	Werner Klingler	Heinrich George	
1949	The Last Illusion	Walter	Josef von Báky	Fritz Kortner	
1951	The Sinful Border	Hugo Mielke	Robert A. Stemmle	Dieter Borsche, Inge Egger and Peter Mosbacher	
1952	Poison in the Zoo	Oskar Beck	Hans Müller	Irene von Meyendorff	
1952	Under the Thousand Lanterns	Braun	Erich Engel	Michel Auclair	
1952	The Great Temptation	Prosecutor	Rolf Hansen	Dieter Borsche, Ruth Leuwerik and Renate Mannhardt	
1953	Diary of a Married Woman	Dr. Hugendübel	Josef von Báky	Maria Schell and O. W. Fischer	
1953	The Man Between	Olaf Kastner	Carol Reed	James Mason, Claire Bloom and Hildegard Knef	
1954	The Perfect Couple	Dr. Martini	Robert A. Stemmle	Ingeborg Körner and Hans Reiser	
1954	Captain Wronski	Stepan	Ulrich Erfurth	Willy Birgel, Elisabeth Flickenschildt	
1954	The Great Test	Dr. Rottach	Rudolf Jugert	Luise Ullrich and Hans Söhnker	
1955	Love Without Illusions	Jellinek	Erich Engel	Sonja Ziemann and Curd Jürgens	
1955	The Plot to Assassinate Hitler	SS-Obergruppenführer	Falk Harnack	Wolfgang Preiss	
1955	The Captain and His Hero	Hauptmann Eisenhecker	Max Nosseck	Jo Herbst	
1955	Du mein stilles Tal	Dr. Zöller	Leonard Steckel	Curd Jürgens and Winnie Markus	
1956	Night of Decision	Jacques Ardent	Falk Harnack	Carl Raddatz, Hilde Krahl and Albert Lieven	
1956	Without You All Is Darkness	Arthur Wehrmann	Curd Jürgens	Eva Bartok and Curd Jürgens	
1956	Kitty and the Great Big World	Mr. Crawford - Sekretär	Alfred Weidenmann	Romy Schneider, Karlheinz Böhm and O.E. Hasse	
1956	The Story of Anastasia		Falk Harnack	Lilli Palmer and Ivan Desny	
1957	Stresemann	Dr. Gustav Stresemann	Alfred Braun	Anouk Aimée and Wolfgang Preiss	
1958	Man müßte nochmal zwanzig sein		Hans Quest	Karlheinz Böhm	
1958	Resurrection	Der Gouverneur	Rolf Hansen	Horst Buchholz	
1958	Iron Gustav	Friedrich Karl Möbius	George Hurdalek	Heinz Rühmann and Lucie Mannheim	
1958	As Long as the Heart Still Beats	Franke	Alfred Weidenmann	O.E. Hasse	
1959	The Man Who Sold Himself	Münchmann	Josef von Báky	Hildegard Knef and Hansjörg Felmy	
1959	The Black Chapel	Julian Hoffmann	Ralph Habib	Peter van Eyck	
1959	Marili	Waldemar Heller	Josef von Báky	Sabine Sinjen and Paul Hubschmid	
1960	Strafbataillon 999	Dr. Kukill	Harald Philipp	Sonja Ziemann	
1960	The High Life	Monsieur Alexander	Julien Duvivier	Giulietta Masina, Gustav Knuth and Gert Fröbe	
1960	My Schoolfriend	Hauptmann Kühn	Robert Siodmak	Heinz Rühmann	
1962	The Counterfeit Traitor	Baron Gerhard von Oldenburg	George Seaton	William Holden and Lilli Palmer	
1962	The Longest Day	Gen. Hans von Salmuth	Ken Annakin, Andrew Marton, Bernhard Wicki and Darryl F. Zanuck	John Wayne and Robert Mitchum	Uncredited
1963	The Nylon Noose	G.B. Harrison	Rudolf Zehetgruber	Dietmar Schönherr	
1964	The Secret of Dr. Mabuse	Chefarzt	Hugo Fregonese	Peter van Eyck and O. E. Hasse	
1964	The Visit	Mayor	Bernhard Wicki	Ingrid Bergman and Anthony Quinn	
1965	Marvelous Angelique	Le capitaine du Châtelet	Bernard Borderie	Michèle Mercier, Giuliano Gemma and Jean-Louis Trintignant	
1965	Heidi	Konsul Alfred Sesemann	Werner Jacobs	Gustav Knuth and Margot Trooger	
1974	The Odessa File	Werner Deilman	Ronald Neame	Jon Voight, Maximilian Schell and Maria Schell	

== Television ==
Year	Title	Role	Author	Director	Also Starring	Notes
1960	Abendstunde im Spätherbst	Maximilian Friedrich Korbes	Friedrich Dürrenmatt	Rudolf Noelte		
1962	Life of Galileo	Galileo Galilei	Bertolt Brecht	Egon Monk		
1962	The Beaver Coat	Von Wehrhahn	Gerhart Hauptmann	John Olden	Inge Meysel	
1976	Derrick	Werner Solms	Herbert Reinecker	Alfred Weidenmann	Mathieu Carrière	
1976	Derrick	Dr. Scheibnitz	Herbert Reinecker	Dietrich Haugk	Hans Stetter	
1978	Die Eingesschlossenen		Jean-Paul Sartre	Pinkas Braun	Judy Winter and Uwe Friedrichsen	
1983	Derrick	Professor Rotheim	Herbert Reinecker	Theodor Grädler	Gisela Stein	
1984	Mrs. Harris - Freund mit Rolls Royce	Sir Wilmot	Paul Gallico	Georg Tressler	Inge Meysel, Edith Volkmann and Eberhard Feik	
1985	A Crime of Honour a.k.a. A Song for Europe	Herr Direktor	Peter Prince	John Goldschmidt	David Suchet and Maria Schneider	
1988	Lorentz & Söhne	Lauritz Lorentz		Claus Peter Witt	Heli Finkenzeller, Hans Korte and Gerd Baltus	
1992	Derrick - Die Festmenüs des Herrn Borgelt		Herbert Reinecker			
1992	Rochade	Melkovic	Ladislav Mňačko	Peter Patzak	Michael York and Iris Berben	(final film role)
