= Eva Maria Meineke =

German actress (1923–2018)

- Born: 8 October 1923; Berlin, Germany
- Died: 7 May 2018 (aged 94); Mallorca, Spain
- Occupation: Actress
- Years active: 1942-2008

Eva Maria Meineke (8 October 1923 - 7 May 2018) was a German actress. She appeared in more than one hundred films from 1942 to 2008, including Yesterday Girl and Something for Everyone.

== Selected filmography ==
Year	Title	Role	Notes
1944	The Enchanted Day	Anni Berger	
1946	Tell the Truth		
1948	The Trial		
1955	Three Men in the Snow	Thea Casparius	
1956	Forest Liesel	Carola	
1958	Scampolo	Sabina	
1959	Jacqueline	Charlotte Christens	
1959	The Beautiful Adventure	Cathérine	
1965	The House in Karp Lane	Lilly Mautner	
1966	Yesterday Girl	Mrs. Pichota	
1970	Something for Everyone	Mrs. Pleschke	
1971	Twenty Girls and the Teachers	Miss Brösel	
1971	Morgen fällt die Schule aus	Mrs. Knörz	
1972	César and Rosalie	Lucie Artigues	
1973	Dream City	Mrs. Lampenbogen	
1973	Night Flight from Moscow	Mrs. von Streilitz	
1976	The Clown	Mrs. Schnier	
1976	To the Devil a Daughter	Eveline de Grass	
1979	Der Sturz	Rosa Blomich	
1980	Death Watch	Dr. Klausen	
1980	The American Success Company	Mrs. Heinemann	
1981	Fantasma d'amore	Teresa Monti	
1981	The Temptation	Joanna	TV film
