= Philharmonic (film) =

1944 film

- Directed by: Paul Verhoeven
- Written by: Erich Ebermayer; Friedrich Herzfeld; Paul Verhoeven
- Produced by: Herbert Engelsing
- Starring: Eugen Klöpfer; Will Quadflieg; Irene von Meyendorff
- Cinematography: Friedl Behn-Grund
- Edited by: Hans Heinrich
- Music by: Heinz-Friedel Heddenhausen
- Production company: Tobis Film
- Distributed by: Deutsche Filmvertriebs
- Release date: 4 December 1944
- Running time: 80 minutes
- Country: Germany
- Language: German

Philharmonic (German: Philharmoniker) is a 1944 German romantic musical drama film directed by Paul Verhoeven and starring Eugen Klöpfer, Will Quadflieg and Irene von Meyendorff. It was shot at the Babelsberg Studios in Berlin. The film's sets were designed by the art directors Otto Erdmann and Franz F. Fürst. Produced at the height of the Second World War, it incorporated footage of the Berlin Philharmonic's tour of neutral Portugal and Spain.

== Synopsis ==
In the early 1930s during the Weimar Republic the Berlin Philharmonic is struggling for funds due to the Great Depression. Violinist Alexander Schonath disappoints his father, one of the longest-serving members of the Philharmonic, by leaving to join a light music orchestra. On the way to his eventual reconciliation with his father, he begins a romance with Maria.

== Cast ==
- Eugen Klöpfer as Vater Schonarth
- Will Quadflieg as Alexander Schonath
- Malte Jaeger as Hans Schonath
- Theodor Loos as Herbert Hartwig
- Irene von Meyendorff as Maria Hartwig
- Erich Ponto as Straehle
- Kirsten Heiberg as Heddy Lindt
- Elisabeth Flickenschildt as Fuchs, Konzertagentin
- O.E. Hasse as Urdol, Konzertagent
- Franz Schafheitlin as Ministerialrat
- Eduard von Winterstein as Arzt
- Erika von Thellmann as Frau Brettschneider
- Erich Fiedler as Schneemann
- Paul Verhoeven as Grode
- Curt Ackermann as Direktor der Rio-Bar
- Jeanette Bethge as Bertha, Dienstmädchen
- Oscar Sabo as Schulz
- Karl Etlinger as Weidner
- Herbert Gernot as Ullmann
- Paul Rehkopf as Mack

== Bibliography ==
- Klaus, Ulrich J. Deutsche Tonfilme. Klaus-Archiv, 1988.
- Morris, John. Culture and Propaganda in World War II: Music, Film and the Battle for National Identity. Bloomsbury Academic, 2020.
- Rentschler, Eric. The Ministry of Illusion: Nazi Cinema and Its Afterlife. Harvard University Press, 1996.
