= Heinz Schulz-Neudamm =

German graphic designer and illustrator

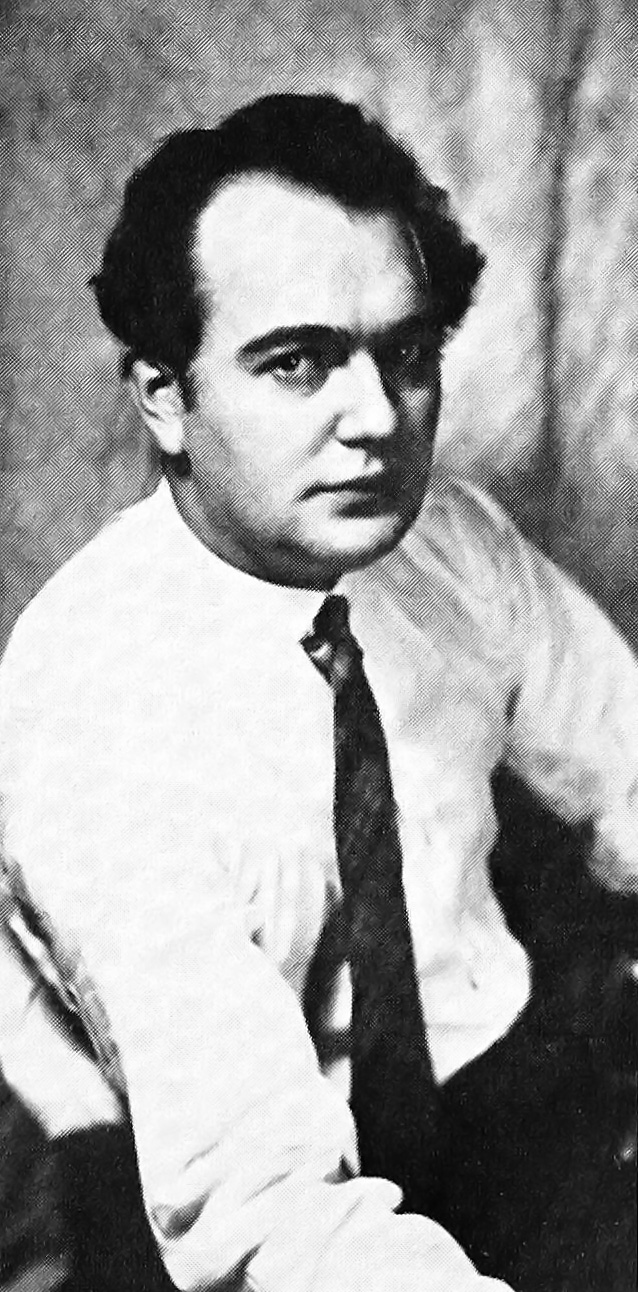
- Schulz-Neudamm c. 1929
- Born: Paul Heinz Otto Schulz; 7 July 1899; Neudamm, Germany
- Died: 13 May 1969 (aged 69); Wiesbaden, Hesse, West Germany
- Occupation(s): Graphic designer, illustrator

Heinz Schulz-Neudamm (born Paul Heinz Otto Schulz; 7 July 1899 – 13 May 1969) was a German graphic designer and illustrator. He is best known for designing posters for films. The poster for Metropolis is considered the world's highest-valued poster.
