= Tell the Truth (film) =

1946 film

- Film poster
- Directed by: Helmut Weiss
- Written by: Johann von Vásáry (play); Ernst Marischka
- Produced by: Artur Brauner; Viktor de Kowa; Winnie Markus; Heinz Rühmann
- Starring: Gustav Fröhlich; Mady Rahl; Ingeborg von Kusserow
- Cinematography: Hans Hauptmann; Walter Pindter
- Edited by: Anneliese Schönnenbeck
- Music by: Werner Bochmann; Werner Eisbrenner
- Production companies: Studio 45-Film; Terra Film
- Distributed by: Herzog-Filmverleih
- Release date: 20 December 1946
- Running time: 96 minutes
- Country: Germany
- Language: German

Tell the Truth (German: Sag' die Wahrheit) is a 1946 German comedy film directed by Helmut Weiss and starring Gustav Fröhlich, Mady Rahl, and Ingeborg von Kusserow. The film had a troubled production, and was originally filming in the final days of the Nazi era with Heinz Rühmann and his wife Hertha Feiler in the lead roles. Production was halted when Soviet forces took control of the Tempelhof Studios during the Battle of Berlin. The film was then remade in the British sector of Berlin with different leads but using substantial amounts of footage already shot during the previous production. The film's sets were designed by the art director Ernst H. Albrecht.

== Cast ==
- Gustav Fröhlich as Peter Hellmer
- Mady Rahl as Vera, seine Frau
- Ingeborg von Kusserow as Maria, seine Braut
- Sonja Ziemann as Lisa, seine Freundin
- Eva Maria Meineke
- Georg Thomalla as Dr. Klimm, Lawyer
- Hans Brausewetter
- Aribert Wäscher as Professor Kiekebusch, sein Nervenarzt
- Curt Ackermann as Robert Färber
- Hubert von Meyerinck
- Max Gülstorff as Bankdirektor Förster
- Erich Fiedler as Richard Krüger, Baumeister
- Kurt Vespermann
- Wolfgang Dohnberg as Klub-Präsident
- Else Reval as Frau des Klubpräsidenten
- Karl Etlinger
- Walter Gross as Versicherungsagent
- Richard Ludwig as Rudolf, Oberkellner
- Harald Sawade as Paul Bachmann
- Erika von Thellmann
- Paul Bildt
- Günther Güssefeldt
- Marlise Ludwig as Frau Holzer
- Lutz Götz
- Ingrid Lutz as Hedi Holzer
- Erwin Biegel as Dr. Kemmelbach
- Elsa Wagner as Schwester Ida
- Susi Deitz as Schwester Adelheid
- Kurt Weitkamp as Walter
- Wilhelm Bendow as Reporter Fridolin
- Helmut Weiss as Landesgerichtsrat
- Bernd Kaspar as Dr. Fabian
- Bully Buhlan as Singer
- Ilse Werner as Singer

== Bibliography ==
- Hardt, Ursula (1996). From Caligari to California: Erich Pommer's Life in the International Film Wars. Providence: Berghahn Books. ISBN 978-1-57181-930-7.
