= The Black Chapel =

1959 film

- Directed by: Ralph Habib
- Produced by: Artur Brauner; Wolf Brauner; Emanuele Cassuto; Paolo Giovanardi
- Starring: Dawn Addams; Peter van Eyck; Ernst Schröder
- Cinematography: Georg Krause
- Edited by: Emma Le Chanois; Martha Dübber
- Music by: Roman Vlad
- Production companies: Alfa Film; Nepi Film; Lux Compagnie Cinématographique de France
- Distributed by: Prisma Film
- Release date: 16 October 1959
- Countries: France; Italy; West Germany
- Language: German

The Black Chapel (German: Geheimaktion schwarze Kapelle) is a 1959 political thriller film directed by Ralph Habib and starring Dawn Addams, Peter van Eyck and Ernst Schröder. It is based on the novel Die schwarze Kapelle by Olav Herfeldt. It is a co-production between West Germany, Italy (where the film is known as I sicari di Hitler) and France (where it was released with the title R.P.Z. appelle Berlin).

It was shot at the Spandau Studios in Berlin with location shooting in Rome. The film's sets were designed by the art directors Otto Erdmann and Beni Montresor.

== Plot ==
Europe, in the spring of 1940. After the lightning victory over Poland, Hitler's Wehrmacht drew up plans of attack for the overthrow of Western and Northern Europe. Several high-ranking officers fear that Hitler's excessive policy of conquest will ultimately plunge Germany into the abyss and therefore intend to contact Great Britain through diplomatic channels. After careful consideration, these officers from the management level of the Wehrmacht selected the journalist Robert Golder, who was critical of the regime, in order to establish contacts with the enemy. But also the other side in the form of Reichsführer SS Heinrich Himmler has not remained inactive and tries to dig the nest of resistance. Due to a warning from the waiter in his favorite pub, Golder barely escaped being arrested by the Gestapo but was subsequently overwhelmed and kidnapped. But it is not Himmler's henchmen who kidnapped Golder. Rather, it is the resistance group behind it who want to use Golder as a messenger. He is supposed to convey Hitler's plans for the upcoming campaign in the West to a person of trust in the Vatican so that countermeasures can be initiated in the affected countries. This is to prevent a further escalation of the war.

The plan of the opposing Wehrmacht officers is to be able to hold talks with the British and French after a planned overthrow of Hitler in order to conclude a separate peace. Robert Golder is sent to Rome with the secret plans for the western campaign to a respected member of the Catholic Church. Himmler cannot prevent Golder from leaving the empire for Italy with a forged passport. But he notifies his most loyal representative on-site, the senior SS-Mann Hoffmann. This brawny guy has set up a regime of terror in the Italian capital that is disgusted by the ally in the form of the Roman police prefect Ferrari. While Golder intends to visit his contact, the other side is not idle, because Golder's opponents still have an ace up their sleeve: the equally pretty and dangerous top agent Tilla Turner, who is assigned to the journalist on a secret mission. But opponents eventually become confidants when Golder and Tilla fall in love. Now both are in mortal danger...

== Cast ==
- Dawn Addams as Tilla Turner
- Peter van Eyck as Robert Golder
- Ernst Schröder as Julian Hoffmann
- Werner Hinz as Generaloberst
- Franco Fabrizi as Graf Emanuele Rossi
- Werner Peters as Heinrich Himmler
- Rosy Mazzacurati as Gräfin Dodo Ventura
- Herbert Wilk as Oberst Horster
- Heinz Giese as Obergruppenführer Eichenberg
- Günter Meisner as 1. Killer
- Inken Deter as Elsa
- Rolf Moebius as Adjutant
- Marco Guglielmi as Pater Orlando
- Maurice Marsac as Britischer Botschafter
- Gino Cervi as Polizeipräfekt Ferrari

== See also ==
- Schwarze Kapelle
- Red Orchestra

== Bibliography ==
- Bergfelder, Tim & Bock, Hans-Michael. The Concise Cinegraph: Encyclopedia of German. Berghahn Books, 2009.
- Davidson, John & Hake, Sabine. Framing the Fifties: Cinema in a Divided Germany. Berghahn Books, 2007.
