= Curt Ackermann =

German actor and voice actor

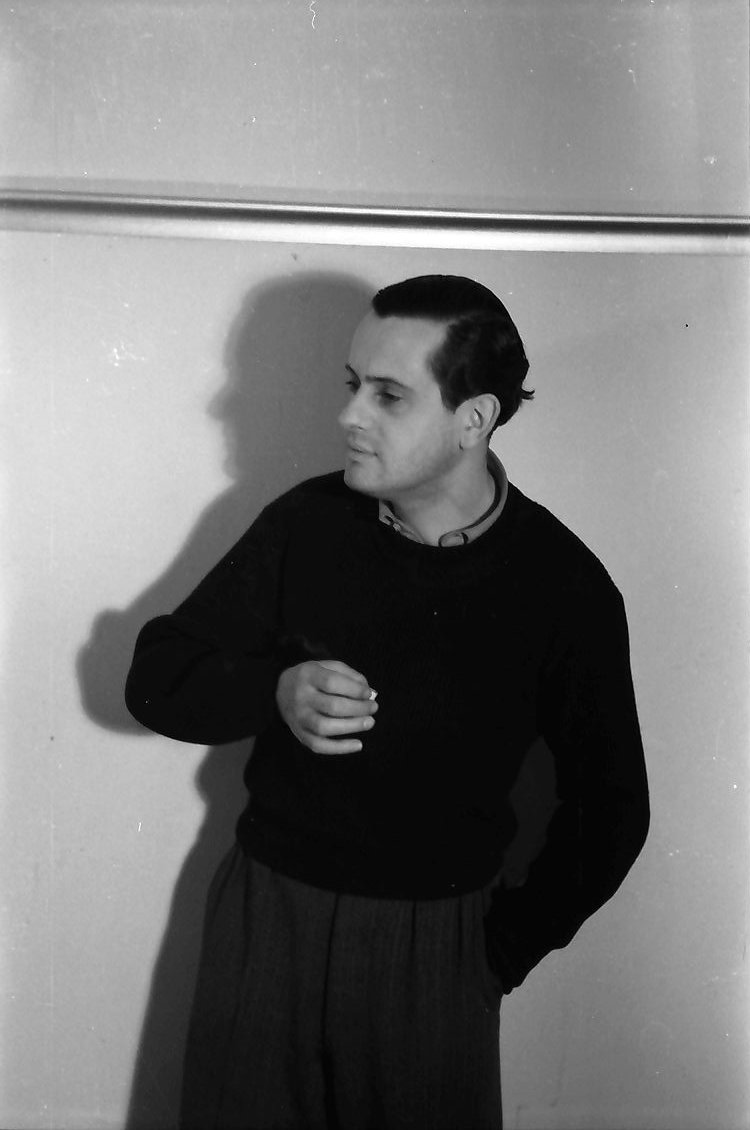
- Curt Ackermann in 1939.
- Born: Peter Cornelius; 8 April 1905; Dortmund, Province of Westphalia, German Empire
- Died: 1988 (aged 82–83); Munich, Bavaria, West Germany
- Occupation: Actor
- Years active: 1934–1970 (film)

Curt Ackermann (8 April 1905 – 1988) was a German stage and film actor. He also worked regularly as a voice actor, dubbing foreign films for release in Germany.

== Selected filmography ==
- The Mysterious Mister X (1936)
- The Merry Wives (1936)
- Signal in the Night (1937)
- Yvette (1938)
- Melody of a Great City (1943)
- A Man with Principles? (1943)
- Back Then (1943)
- The Enchanted Day (1944)
- Philharmonic (1944)
- Tell the Truth (1946)
- The Chaplain of San Lorenzo (1953)
- The Captain and His Hero (1955)
- Tattoo (1967)

== Bibliography ==
- Waldman, Harry. Nazi Films in America, 1933–1942. McFarland, 2008.
