= Jo Herbst =

German actor (1928–1980)

- Born: 11 August 1928; Berlin, Germany
- Died: September 18, 1980 (aged 52); West Berlin, West Germany
- Occupation: Actor
- Years active: 1948–1980 (film)

Jo Herbst (1928–1980) was a German film and television actor.

== Selected filmography ==
- The Big Star Parade (1954)
- The Captain and His Hero (1955)
- Heroism after Hours (1955)
- Teenage Wolfpack (1956)
- Confessions of Felix Krull (1957)
- Rosemary (1958)
- Peter Shoots Down the Bird (1959)
- We Cellar Children (1960)

== Bibliography ==
- Hardy, Phil. The BFI Companion to Crime. A&C Black, 1997.
