= Luise Millerin =

1922 film

- Directed by: Carl Froelich
- Written by: Friedrich Schiller (play); Georg Wilhelm Pabst; Walter Supper
- Produced by: Erich Pommer; Paul Ebner; Maxim Galitzenstein
- Starring: Lil Dagover; Paul Hartmann; Walter Janssen
- Cinematography: Vilmos Fenyes; Kurt Lande
- Production company: Carl Froelich-Film
- Distributed by: UFA
- Release date: 21 August 1922
- Country: Germany
- Languages: Silent; German intertitles

Luise Millerin is a 1922 German historical film directed by Carl Froelich and starring Lil Dagover, Paul Hartmann and Walter Janssen. It is based on the play Intrigue and Love by Friedrich Schiller.

== Cast ==
- Lil Dagover as Luise Millerin
- Paul Hartmann as Ferdinand
- Walter Janssen as Fürst von Anspach
- Gertrude Welcker as Lady Emilie Milford
- Friedrich Kühne as Präsident
- Fritz Kortner as Miller
- Werner Krauss as Sekretär Wurm
- Ilka Grüning as Millerin
- Reinhold Schünzel as Hofmarschall Kalb
