= Erich Fiedler =

German actor

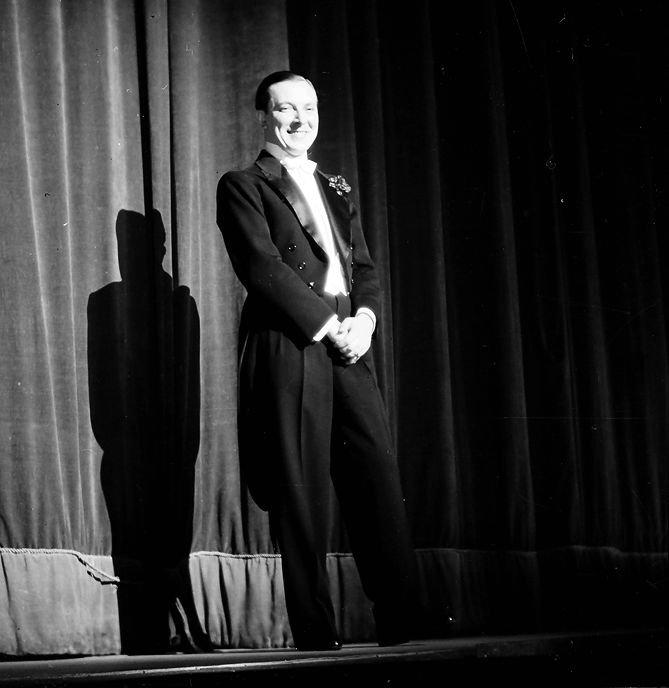
- Born: 15 March 1901; Berlin; German Empire
- Died: 19 May 1981 (aged 80); West Berlin, West Germany
- Occupation: Film actor
- Years active: 1932 - 1975

Erich Fiedler (15 March 1901 – 19 May 1981) was a German film actor. He was the German dubbing voice of Robert Morley.

== Selected filmography ==
- The Escape to Nice (1932)
- Overnight Sensation (1932)
- Marion, That's Not Nice (1933)
- The Gentleman from Maxim's (1933)
- The Page from the Dalmasse Hotel (1933)
- The Two Seals (1934)
- Black Fighter Johanna (1934)
- Love Conquers All (1934)
- The Flower Girl from the Grand Hotel (1934)
- The Sporck Battalion (1934)
- My Life for Maria Isabella (1935)
- The Man with the Paw (1935)
- The Cossack and the Nightingale (1935)
- The Green Domino (1935)
- Every Day Isn't Sunday (1935)
- I Was Jack Mortimer (1935)
- The Student of Prague (1935)
- Uncle Bräsig (1936)
- Escapade (1936)
- Paul and Pauline (1936)
- Susanne in the Bath (1936)
- Game on Board (1936)
- Savoy Hotel 217 (1936)
- The Girl Irene (1936)
- Intermezzo (1936)
- Woman's Love—Woman's Suffering (1937)
- Der Etappenhase (1937)
- Land of Love (1937)
- Seven Slaps (1937)
- Not a Word About Love (1937)
- Adventure in Love (1938)
- Secret Mission (1938)
- Little County Court (1938)
- Faded Melody (1938)
- Mystery About Beate (1938)
- The Deruga Case (1938)
- The Green Emperor (1939)
- The Sensational Casilla Trial (1939)
- Police Report (1939)
- Marriage in Small Doses (1939)
- Kora Terry (1940)
- My Daughter Doesn't Do That (1940)
- The Girl at the Reception (1940)
- Women Are Better Diplomats (1941)
- The Big Shadow (1942)
- I pagliacci (1943)
- Laugh Bajazzo (1943)
- A Salzburg Comedy (1943)
- Light of Heart (1943)
- The Buchholz Family (1944)
- Philharmonic (1944)
- Marriage of Affection (1944)
- The Enchanted Day (1944)
- A Cheerful House (1944)
- The Impostor (1944)
- The Years Pass (1945)
- Tell the Truth (1946)
- Journey to Happiness (1948)
- Queen of the Night (1951)
- You Only Live Once (1952)
- Three Days of Fear (1952)
- The Divorcée (1953)
- Love Without Illusions (1955)
- Your Life Guards (1955)
- A Thousand Melodies (1956)
- Black Forest Melody (1956)
- The Mad Bomberg (1957)
- Munchhausen in Africa (1958)
- My Ninety Nine Brides (1958)
- The Juvenile Judge (1960)
- The Red Hand (1960)
- Robert and Bertram (1961)
- Jack and Jenny (1963)
- Eine Nacht in Venedig (1974)

== Bibliography ==
- Kreimeier, Klaus. The UFA Story: A Story of Germany's Greatest Film Company 1918-1945. University of California Press, 1999.
