= The Enchanted Day =

1944 film

- Eva Maria Meineke and Winnie Markus in their station kiosk
- Directed by: Peter Pewas
- Written by: Peter Pewas; Renate Uhl
- Based on: Der verzauberte Tag by Franz Nabl
- Produced by: Viktor von Struwe
- Starring: Winnie Markus; Hans Stüwe; Ernst Waldow
- Cinematography: Georg Krause
- Edited by: Ira Oberberg
- Music by: Wolfgang Zeller
- Production company: Terra Film
- Distributed by: Deutsche Filmvertriebs
- Release dates: 6 July 1944; 17 May 1951 (general release)
- Running time: 76 minutes
- Country: Germany
- Language: German

The Enchanted Day (German: Der verzauberte Tag) is a 1944 German romantic drama film directed by Peter Pewas, and starring Winnie Markus, Hans Stüwe and Ernst Waldow. The film was produced at the Babelsberg Studios by Terra Film, one of Germany's four dominant production companies. The sets were designed by Erich Grave.

The film's release was considerably delayed by Joseph Goebbels' Propaganda ministry after an initial screening in 1944 led to numerous objections. Attempts to improve it meant it was not released before the end of the Second World War. It finally premiered in Sweden in 1947 before going on general release in West Germany in 1951.

== Synopsis ==
The plot explores the romantic ambitions of two women who work at a kiosk in a railway station.

== Cast ==
- Winnie Markus as Christine Schweiger
- Hans Stüwe as Professor Albrecht Götz
- Ernst Waldow as Rudolf Krummholz
- Eva Maria Meineke as Anni
- Hans Brausewetter as Wasner
- Carola Toelle as Frau Schweiger
- Karl Etlinger as Geschwander
- Curt Ackermann as Herr Maximilian
- Kate Kühl as Frau Pospischil
- Anneliese Würtz as Frau Hirblinger
- Karl Meixner as Kriminalbeamter
- Erich Fiedler as Dr. Steinacker
- Herbert Gernot as Augenarzt
- Karl Troxbömker as Diener
- Martha von Konssatzki as Blumenfrau

== Bibliography ==
- O'Brien, Mary-Elizabeth (2006) [2004]. Nazi Cinema as Enchantment: The Politics of Entertainment in the Third Reich. Boydell & Brewer. ISBN 978-1-57113-283-3.
