= Karl Etlinger =

German actor (1879–1946)

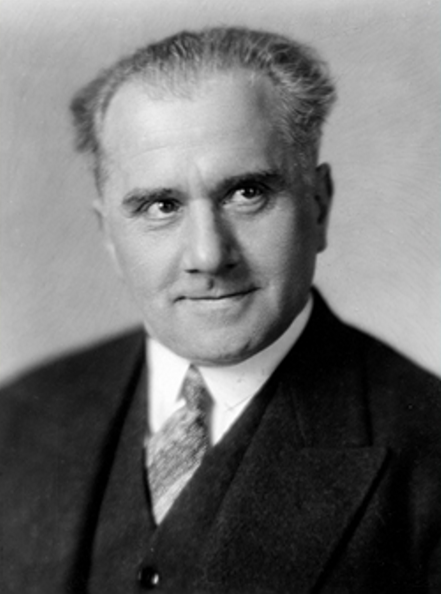
- Born: 16 October 1879; Vienna, Austria-Hungary
- Died: 8 May 1946 (aged 66); Berlin, Allied-occupied Germany
- Occupation: Actor
- Years active: 1914–1946

Karl Franz Etlinger (16 October 1879 – 8 May 1946) was a German film actor. He appeared in more than 110 films between 1914 and 1946.

== Selected filmography ==
- The Eternal Curse (1921)
- The Poisoned Stream (1921)
- The Films of Princess Fantoche (1921)
- Lumpaci the Vagabond (1922)
- Nosferatu (1922)
- What Belongs to Darkness (1922)
- The Lodging House for Gentleman (1922)
- Phantom (1922)
- Countess Donelli (1924)
- Debit and Credit (1924)
- The Man at Midnight (1924)
- Zigano (1925)
- The Girl with a Patron (1925)
- We'll Meet Again in the Heimat (1926)
- One Does Not Play with Love (1926)
- Fadette (1926)
- Young Blood (1926)
- Bigamie (1927)
- That Was Heidelberg on Summer Nights (1927)
- The Bordellos of Algiers (1927)
- Family Gathering in the House of Prellstein (1927)
- Katharina Knie (1929)
- Napoleon at Saint Helena (1929)
- The Woman One Longs For (1929)
- Waltz of Love (1930)
- Two Hearts in Waltz Time (1930)
- Scandalous Eva (1930)
- End of the Rainbow (1930)
- The King of Paris (1930)
- Men Behind Bars (1931)
- Bombs on Monte Carlo (1931)
- The Mask Falls (1931)
- Die Fledermaus (1931)
- Kismet (1931)
- The Concert (1931)
- A Night at the Grand Hotel (1931)
- The Ringer (1932)
- The Countess of Monte Cristo (1932)
- Madame Makes Her Exit (1932)
- Love at First Sight (1932)
- The Golden Anchor (1932)
- Melody of Love (1932)
- Variety (1935)
- The Dreamer (1936)
- Savoy Hotel 217 (1936)
- The Glass Ball (1937)
- An Enemy of the People (1937)
- Maria Ilona (1939)
- Mistake of the Heart (1939)
- My Aunt, Your Aunt (1939)
- Falstaff in Vienna (1940)
- Small Town Poet (1940)
- Passion (1940)
- Happiness is the Main Thing (1941)
- The Way to Freedom (1941)
- The Great Love (1942)
- Gabriele Dambrone (1943)
- A Man With Principles? (1943)
- Back Then (1943)
- Romance in a Minor Key (1943)
- The Eternal Tone (1943)
- The Enchanted Day (1944)
- Philharmonic (1944)
- Tell the Truth (1946)
- An Everyday Story (1948)
- The Court Concert (1948)
