= Heinz Giese =

German actor (1919–2010)

- Born: 5 June 1919; Stettin, Pomerania, Germany
- Died: October 19, 2010 (aged 91); Berlin, Germany
- Occupation: Actor
- Years active: 1952–2003

Heinz Giese (June 5, 1919 – October 19, 2010) was a German film and television actor. He was also a voice actor, dubbing foreign-language films for release in Germany.

== Selected filmography ==
- All Clues Lead to Berlin (1952)
- The Captain and His Hero (1955)
- Love Without Illusions (1955)
- Thomas Müntzer (1956)
- The Black Chapel (1959)
- The Investigation (1966, TV film)

== Bibliography ==
- Sigfrid Hoefert. Gerhart Hauptmann und der Film: Mit unveröffentlichten Filmentwürfen des Dichters. Erich Schmidt Verlag, 1996.
