= Northern Cemetery =

Northern Cemetery may refer to:

== Denmark ==
- Jewish Northern Cemetery (Copenhagen)

== Egypt ==
- Northern Cemetery (Cairo), a section of the City of the Dead
- Tombs of the Nobles (Amarna), sometimes referred to as the Northern Cemetery

== Germany ==
- Nordfriedhof (disambiguation) (German: Northern cemetery)
  - Nordfriedhof (Cologne)
  - Nordfriedhof (Dresden)
  - Nordfriedhof (Leipzig)
  - Nordfriedhof (Munich)
    - Nordfriedhof (Munich U-Bahn)
  - Alter Nordfriedhof (Munich)

== New Zealand ==
- Dunedin Northern Cemetery, Dunedin

== Sweden ==
- Norra begravningsplatsen (Swedish: Northern cemetery), Stockholm

== Russia ==
- Khovanskoye Northern Cemetery, Moscow
- Northern Cemetery, Rostov-on-Don

== United Kingdom ==
- New Southgate Cemetery, formerly the Great Northern Cemetery, Brunswick Park, London
- Salford Northern Cemetery, former name of Agecroft Cemetery, in Pendlebury, Greater Manchester
- Northern Cemetery, Kingston upon Hull, Newland

== United States ==
- Northern cemetery in Northern Township, Beltrami County, Minnesota
