= Marina (1960 film) =

1960 film

- Directed by: Paul Martin
- Written by: Artur Brauner; Eckart Hachfeld; Paul Martin
- Produced by: Artur Brauner
- Starring: Giorgia Moll; Rocco Granata; Bubi Scholz
- Cinematography: Ted Kornowicz
- Edited by: Jutta Hering
- Music by: Martin Böttcher
- Production company: CCC Film
- Distributed by: Gloria Film
- Release date: 19 August 1960
- Running time: 90 minutes
- Country: West Germany
- Language: German

Marina is a 1960 West German musical film directed by Paul Martin and starring Giorgia Moll, Rocco Granata and Bubi Scholz.

It was shot at the Spandau Studios in Berlin with sets designed by the art directors Paul Markwitz and Heinrich Weidemann.

== Cast ==
- Rocco Granata as Rocco
- Giorgia Moll as Mary Miller
- Bubi Scholz as Ralf Moebius
- Teddy Stauffer as Robert Miller
- Rudolf Platte as Mr. Herzlieb, nightwatch
- Trude Herr as Trude Pippes
- Renate Holm as Mrs. Renate Henkel
- Jan & Kjeld as Singer
- Silvio Francesco as Silvio
- Rex Gildo as Rex
- Gerold Wanke as Max
- Jonny Buchardt as Fratzke
- Gabriele Clonisch as Gabriele, Mr. Herzlieb's niece
- Zizi Rascas as Zizi
- Irene Mann as Irene
- Hannelore Elsner as Christa
- Kurt Waitzmann as 1. Inspektor
- Kurt Pratsch-Kaufmann as 2. Inspektor
- Bully Buhlan as Peter Hiller

== Bibliography ==
- Bjørn Rasmussen. Filmens hvem-vad-hvor: Udenlanske film 1950–1967. Politiken, 1968.
