= Robert and Bertram (1961 film) =

1961 film

- German film poster
- German: Robert und Bertram
- Directed by: Hans Deppe
- Written by: Gustav Raeder (play); Janne Furch; Gustav Kampendonk
- Produced by: Artur Brauner
- Starring: Willy Millowitsch; Vico Torriani; Trude Herr; Marlies Behrens
- Cinematography: Siegfried Hold
- Edited by: Ilse Voigt
- Music by: Gert Wilden
- Production company: CCC Film
- Distributed by: Europa-Filmverleih
- Release date: 29 September 1961
- Running time: 88 minutes
- Country: West Germany
- Language: German

Robert and Bertram (German: Robert und Bertram) is a 1961 West German comedy film directed by Hans Deppe and starring Willy Millowitsch, Vico Torriani and Trude Herr. It was inspired by the characters in Gustav Raeder's 1856 play Robert and Bertram, updated to the modern era.

It was shot at the Spandau Studios in Berlin and on location in the Bavarian town of Eichstätt. The film's sets were designed by the art directors Paul Markwitz and Wilhelm Vorwerg.

== Synopsis ==
Two vagabonds, Robert and Bertram, are hired by a shoe company to walk 500 kilometres to test their new product.

== Cast ==
- Willy Millowitsch as Robert Ziegel
- Vico Torriani as Bertram Weiler
- Trude Herr as Klara Ziegel
- Marlies Behrens as Yvonne Berger
- Helen Vita as Mieze Frühling
- Erwin Strahl as Franco
- Hubert von Meyerinck as Detective Commissioner Wolf
- Ralf Wolter as Toni Knauer
- Margarete Haagen as old lady in the car
- Arno Paulsen as Direktor Malina
- Kurt Pratsch-Kaufmann as policeman
- Erich Fiedler as Dr. Abendroth
- Kurt Waitzmann as Dr. Sommerfeld
- Johanna König as Fräulein Sellner
- Franz Schneider as Kegelbruder Franz
- Josef Tilgen as Kegelbruder Hans
- Egon Vogel as Kegelbruder Willi
- Lotti Krekel as Dagmar, hitchhiker
- Anja Brüning as Gisela, hitchhiker
