= Kurt Waitzmann =

German actor

- Born: 30 January 1905; Bitterfeld, German Empire
- Died: 21 May 1985 (aged 80); West Berlin, West Germany
- Occupation: Actor
- Years active: 1937–1969

Kurt Waitzmann (30 January 1905 – 21 May 1985) was a German film actor. He appeared in more than 50 films between 1937 and 1969.

== Selected filmography ==
- Unternehmen Michael (1937) - Oblt. Weber
- Urlaub auf Ehrenwort (1938) - Gefreiter Dr. Wegener
- The Marriage Swindler (1938) - Mathias Schröder
- The Holm Murder Case (1938) - Dr. Bernd Körner, Assessor
- Eine Frau kommt in die Tropen (1938) - Kurt v. Köllinghausen
- By a Silken Thread (1938) - Junger Rechtsanwalt
- Die Stimme aus dem Äther (1939) - Dr. Hannes Bolshausen
- Man for Man (1939) - Arzt
- My Daughter Doesn't Do That (1940) - Willy Dahlmann
- Between Hamburg and Haiti (1940) - Gustav Petersen
- Krach im Vorderhaus (1941) - Kuhlmann, Architekt
- Somewhere in Berlin (1946)
- The Time with You (1948) - Ein junger Mann
- Tragödie einer Leidenschaft (1949) - Sergey
- Verspieltes Leben (1949) - Friedrich von Siebenmühlen
- The Murder Trial of Doctor Jordan (1949)
- Five Suspects (1950) - Studienrat Dr. Claudius (uncredited)
- Love on Ice (1950) - Kurt Frischauf
- Fight of the Tertia (1952) - Schularzt
- Red Roses, Red Lips, Red Wine (1953)
- I and You (1953) - Herr Roland
- Hoheit lassen bitten (1954) - Herr von Röhne
- The Immenhof Girls (1955) - Karl-Heinz Kreienbaum (voice, uncredited)
- Roman einer Siebzehnjährigen (1955)
- Ein Mann muß nicht immer schön sein (1956) - Verteidiger
- Made in Germany (1957) - Dr. Mohr
- Endstation Liebe (1958) - Chef in der Fabrik
- Grabenplatz 17 (1958) - Jan Peters (uncredited)
- Bimbo the Great (1958) - Kripobeamter
- The Csardas King (1958) - Kriektor Karscak
- A Thousand Stars Aglitter (1959) - 2. Gläubiger (uncredited)
- Morgen wirst du um mich weinen (1959) - Kommissar
- Yes, Women are Dangerous (1960) - Erster Offizier Petzold
- Marina (1960) - 1. Inspektor
- Brandenburg Division (1960) - 1. Offizier
- The Red Hand (1960) - Inspektor Wolff
- The Time Has Come (1960, TV Mini-Series) - Kommissar Wilde
- Always Trouble with the Bed (1961)
- Robert and Bretram (1961) - Dr. Sommerfeld
- The Secret of the Black Trunk (1962) - Geschäftsführer der Soho-Bar
- Escape from East Berlin (1962) - Prof. Thomas Jurgens
- Tim Frazer (1963, TV Series) - Arthur Crombie
- The Curse of the Hidden Vault (1964) - Mr. Simpson
- Der Hexer (1964) - Reddingwood
- Neues vom Hexer (1965) - Lanny
- Wild Kurdistan (1965) - Ingdscha's brother (uncredited)
- The Sinister Monk (1965) - Cunning
- The Hunchback of Soho (1966) - Sergeant
- The College Girl Murders (1967) - Carrington
- The Hound of Blackwood Castle (1968) - Dr. Sheppard
- The Valley of Death (1968) - Col. Bergson
- Van de Velde: Das Leben zu zweit - Sexualität in der Ehe (1969) - Direktor (final film role)
