= Blandine Ebinger =

German actress (1899–1993)

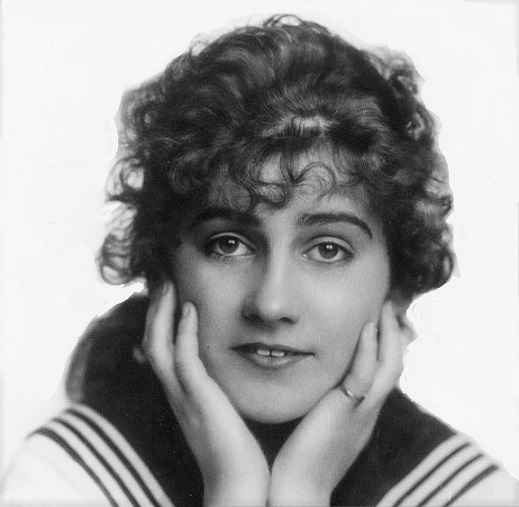
- Ebinger, ca. 1920
- Born: Blandine Loeser; 4 November 1899; Berlin, Germany
- Died: 25 December 1993 (aged 94); Berlin, Germany
- Occupations: actress and singer
- Years active: 1917–1986
- Spouse(s): Friedrich Hollaender (1919–1926) (divorced) (1 child); Helwig Hassenpflug (m. 1965)

Blandine Ebinger (née Blandine Loeser; born 4 November 1899 – 25 December 1993) was a German actress and chansonniere.

== Career ==
Ebinger became acquainted with Friedrich Hollaender in 1919, and with him she became heavily invested as a performer, writer, and composer in the Berlin cabaret scene in the 1920s, beginning in the cabaret Schall und Rauch and the Café des Westens. She recorded many of her husband's, Friedrich Hollaender, cabaret songs, including the set of songs entitled Lieder eines armen Mädchens. Ebinger emigrated to the United States in 1937, returning to Berlin in 1947. She moved to Munich, where she met her second husband, the publisher Helwig Hassenpflug, in 1961. They eventually settled back in Berlin, where she continued her career in the theater and as an actress on television productions.

== Family ==
Ebinger was born in Berlin. She was the daughter of the pianist Gustav Loeser and the actress Margarete Wezel. She married Friedrich Hollaender. Although Ebinger and Hollaender ended their marriage before Hollaender emigrated to the United States because of the increasingly hostile environment for Jewish citizens in the early 1930s, Ebinger nevertheless faced discrimination as a result of the marriage, much of which was directed at their half-Jewish daughter, Philine, who was briefly married to Georg Kreisler.

== Death ==
Ebinger died on 25 December 1993 in Berlin and is buried on the Waldfriedhof Dahlem. She was 94 years old.

== Selected filmography ==
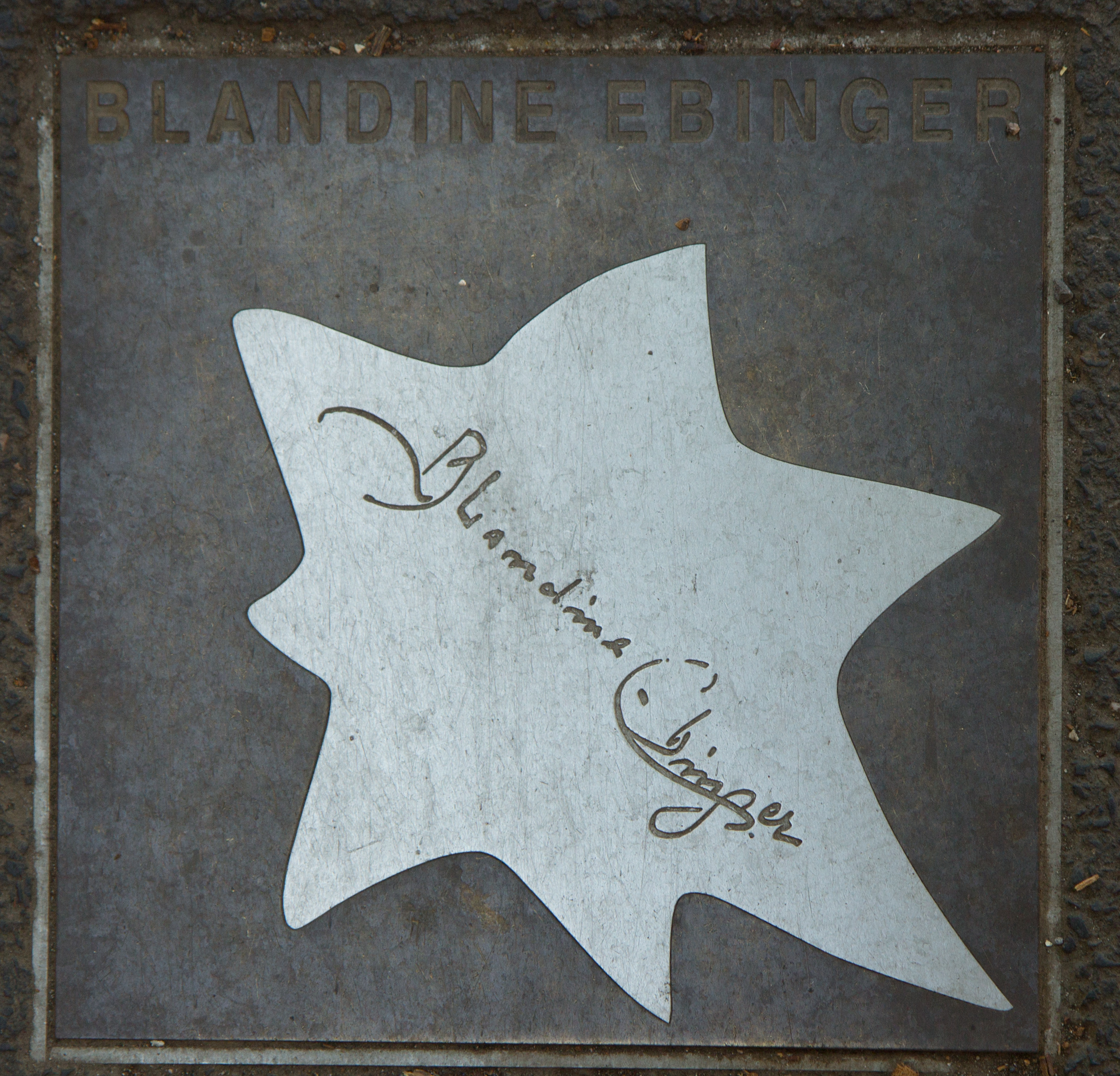
Walk of Fame of Cabaret

- Der zehnte Pavillon der Zitadelle (1917)
- Das Nachträtsel (1917) - Die Unbekannte
- Der Vetter aus Mexiko (1917) - Freundin des Kunstmalers
- Der Teilhaber (1918)
- The Boy in Blue (1919) - Schöne Zigeunerin - Fair gypsy
- Prince Cuckoo (1919)
- The Dagger of Malaya (1919) - Angelina
- Das Schicksal der Carola van Geldern (1919)
- Die Gelbe Fratze (1919) - Kitty
- Der gelbe Schatten (1919)
- Baccarat (1919)
- Peter Voss, Thief of Millions (1921, part 1,2, 4–7) - Aufwaschmädchen
- The Rats (1921) - Sidonie Knobbe
- She and the Three (1922) - Die Zofe
- Between Evening and Morning (1923)
- The Flower Girl of Potsdam Square (1925) - Erna Buschke
- The Woman without Money (1925)
- In der Heimat, da gibt's ein Wiedersehn (1926) - Paula
- Violantha (1927) - Bella - Kellnerin bei Zureich
- Heads Up, Charley (1927) - Näherin
- Cyankali (1930) - Hinterhofsängerin
- Sein Scheidungsgrund (1931) - Hilde Lüders
- Einer Frau muß man alles verzeih'n (1931) - Brunhilde Heidelberger, seine Tochter
- Gitta Discovers Her Heart (1932) - Ilona
- Kitty schwindelt sich ins Glück (1932) - Edith, Pauls Freundin
- The Beautiful Adventure (1932) - Frau Desmigneres
- Unheimliche Geschichten (1932) - Junge Dame im Selbstmörderklub
- Contest (1932) - Hilde, Steppkes Braut
- Das Lied der Schwarzen Berge (1933) - Madame Mériaux
- Song of the Black Mountains (1933) - Frau Winter
- Little Man, What Now? (1933) - Kleinholz' Tochter
- What Am I Without You (1934) - Fräulein Mengler
- Da stimmt was nicht (1934)
- Love Conquers All (1934) - Annie - seine Frau
- Fresh Wind from Canada (1935) - Lore Hartwig, Angestellte Modehaus Granitz
- Es flüstert die Liebe (1935) - Gaby
- Girls in White (1936) - Lydia Antonowana - Erzieherin
- Vor Liebe wird gewarnt (1937) - Mona - Annys Freundin
- Wenn du eine Schwiegermutter hast (1937) - Anita - seine Frau
- Der Lachdoktor (1937) - Madam Ardin, Kurgast
- The Beaver Coat (1937) - Frau Krüger
- The Mountain Calls (1938) - Miß Sweaton
- Prison Ship (1945) - Prisoner (uncredited)
- Blum Affair (1948) - Lucie Schmerschneider
- Five Suspects (1950) - Margarite Lassens
- The Axe of Wandsbek (1950) - Aga Lintze
- The Orplid Mystery (1950) - Sekretärin Auskunftsbüro
- The Staircase (1950) - Fräulein Zärting
- Saure Wochen - frohe Feste (1950) - Adele
- Der Untertan (1951) - Frau von Wulkow
- The Perfect Couple (1954) - Wally Engelschalk, Sekretärin
- Annie from Tharau (1954) - Frau Selke
- The Mosquito (1954) - Frau von Felde
- Verrat an Deutschland (1955) - Anna
- Father's Day (1955) - Hermine v. Streitwitz
- As Long as There Are Pretty Girls (1955) - Frau Otto
- My Children and I (1955) - Untermieterin
- The First Day of Spring (1956) - Elsi
- Die Stimme der Sehnsucht (1956)
- Fräulein (1958) - Frau Berta Graubach
- Mädchen in Uniform (1958) - Miss von Racket
- And That on Monday Morning (1959) - Frau Präfke
- Every Day Isn't Sunday (1959) - Frau Hertel
- The Last Pedestrian (1960) - Henriette
- The Last Witness (1960) - Gymnastiklehrerin ilse Rothe
- The Liar (1961) - Fräulein Kriese
- Bekenntnisse eines möblierten Herrn (1963) - Alma
- Love Has to Be Learned (1963) - Fräulein Lydia Bretschneider
- To Commit a Murder (1967) - (uncredited)
- We Two (1970) - Mutter Flemming
- The Devil Came from Akasava (1971) - Lady Abigail Kingsley
- Hauptsache Ferien (1972) - Fräulein Kröselmeier
- The Spy Who Never Was (1976)

== Portrayals ==
- Hitler: The Rise of Evil (2003), portrayed by Nicole Marischka
