= Nordfriedhof =

Nordfriedhof is the German for "North(ern) Cemetery" or "North(ern) Burial Ground" and may refer to the following:

- Nordfriedhof (Cologne)
- Nordfriedhof (Dresden)
- Nordfriedhof (Leipzig)
- Nordfriedhof (Munich)
  - Nordfriedhof (Munich U-Bahn) station is named from the cemetery
- Alter Nordfriedhof (Munich)
