= Unter Verdacht (TV series) =

- Starring: Senta Berger
- Country of origin: Germany
- No. of episodes: 30

Production
- Running time: 90 or 105 minutes

Original release
- Release: 2002 – 2020

Unter Verdacht is a German crime television series starring Senta Berger as crime council Dr. Eva-Maria Prohacek. Between 2002 and 2020, 30 feature-length episodes were produced. The series aired at Prime time in the channel ZDF.

== Guest ==
- Mehdi Nebbou as Hamid Sherzad

== See also ==
- List of German television series
