= Senta Berger =

Austrian actress (born 1941)

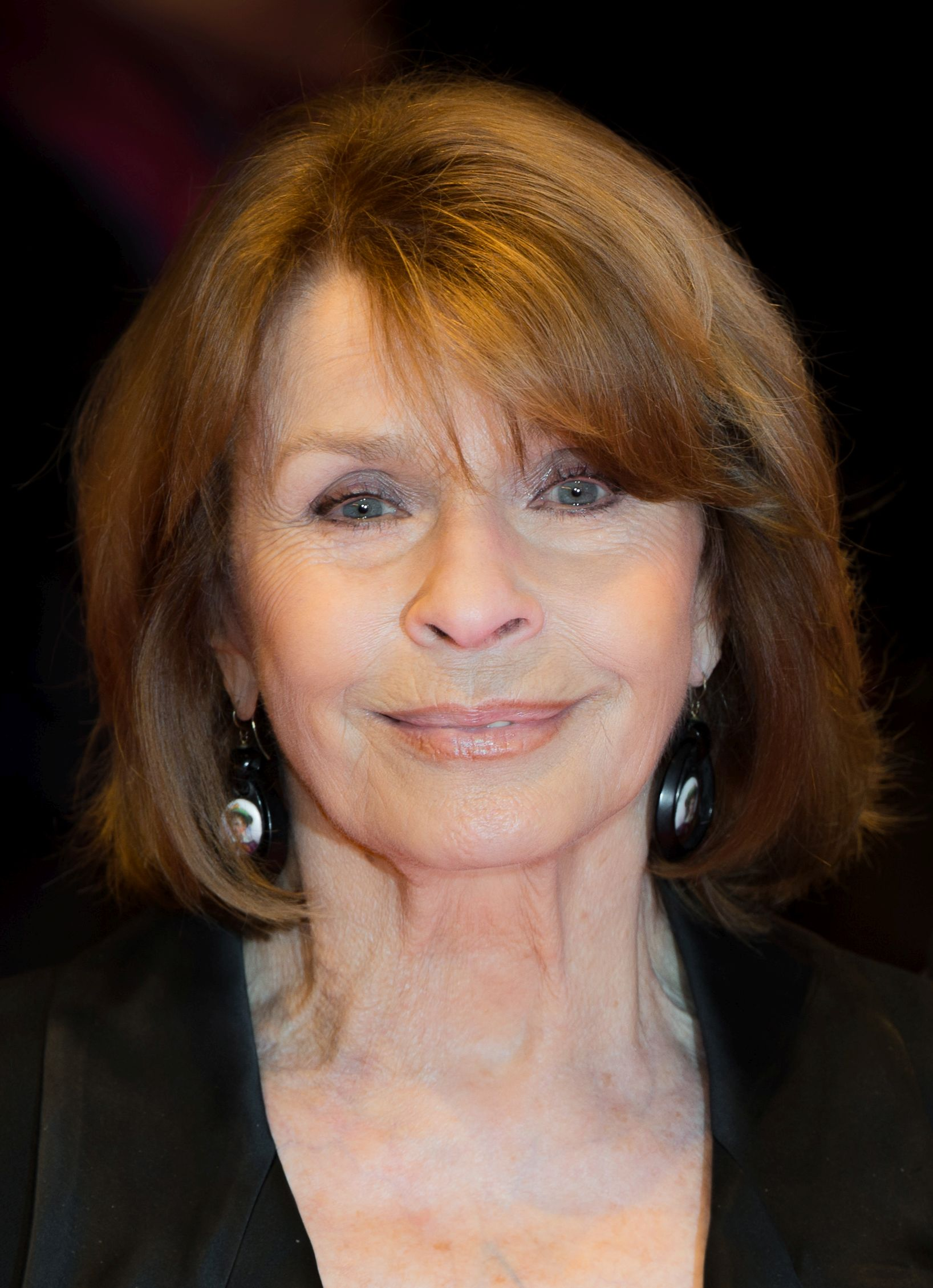
- Berger in 2017
- Born: 13 May 1941 (age 85); Vienna, Austria
- Other name: Senta Verhoeven
- Occupation: Actress
- Years active: 1955–present
- Spouse: Michael Verhoeven (m. 1966; died 2024)
- Children: 2, including Simon Verhoeven
- Relatives: Lis Verhoeven (sister-in-law); Paul Verhoeven (father-in-law)

Senta Verhoeven (née Berger, Austrian German: [ˈsɛnta ˈbɛrɡɐ], German: [ˈzɛnta ˈbɛʁɡɐ]; born 13 May 1941) is an Austrian actress. She received many award nominations for her acting in theatre, film, and television; her awards include three Bambi Awards, two Romys, an Adolf Grimme Award, both a Deutscher Fernsehpreis and a Bayerischer Fernsehpreis, and a Goldene Kamera.

== Early life ==
Berger was born in Vienna during the Second World War to musician Josef Berger (1902–1983) and teacher Therese Jany. She first appeared on stage at the age of four, when her father accompanied her singing on the piano. At the age of five, she started ballet lessons.

Berger also took private acting lessons. In 1957, she landed a small first role in The Unexcused Hour, one of the final films directed by Willi Forst. She was accepted to the Max Reinhardt Seminar, a Viennese acting school, but left shortly afterwards after accepting a film role without permission. In 1958, she became the youngest member of the Josefstadt Theatre in Vienna and appeared in productions of L'Œuf, Charley's Aunt, Much Ado About Nothing', and Cat on a Hot Tin Roof.

== Career ==
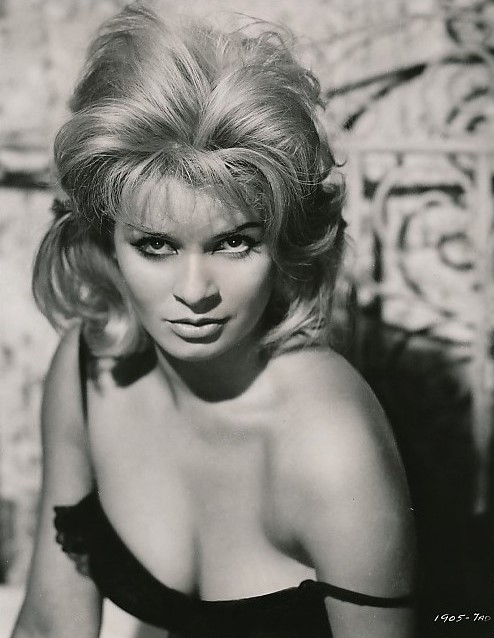
Berger, in The Secret Ways, 1961

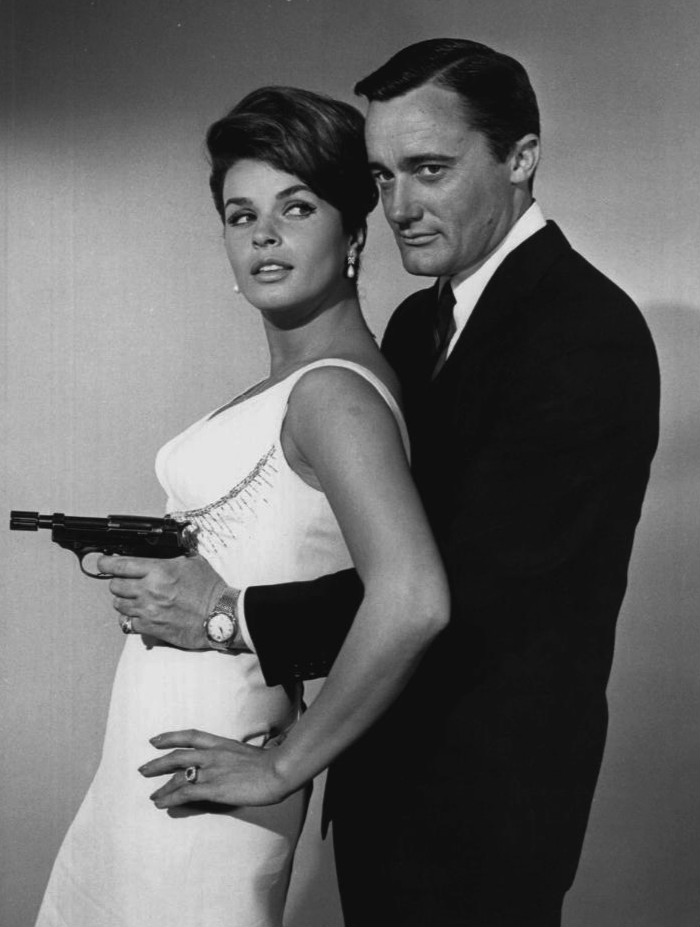
Berger with Robert Vaughn for The Man From U.N.C.L.E. (1964)

In 1960, Bernhard Wicki and Artur Brauner produced the comedy film The Good Soldier Schweik with Berger and German actor Heinz Rühmann. Brauner used Berger in several films, but she soon tired of musicals. In 1962, she went to Hollywood and worked with stars such as Charlton Heston, Dean Martin, Frank Sinatra, Richard Widmark, John Wayne, Kirk Douglas, and Yul Brynner. She returned to Germany to accept an offer for a role in a series, which would have included an obligation of several years. Early publicity material compared her to Brigitte Bardot and Sophia Loren.

In 1963, Berger met her future husband Michael Verhoeven, son of German film director Paul Verhoeven (not to be confused with the Dutch Paul Verhoeven). In November 1964, she guest-starred in an episode of the U.S. television show The Man from U.N.C.L.E, entitled "The Double Affair". It was later expanded and released in cinemas as the feature film The Spy with My Face (1965). Also in 1965, she appeared in two Westerns involving Sam Peckinpah; The Glory Guys (screenplay by Peckinpah), a dramatic representation of Custer's Little Big Horn disaster, based on the novel The Dice of God by Hoffman Birney. Filmed by Levy-Gardner-Laven and released by United Artists, it stars Tom Tryon, Harve Presnell, Senta Berger, James Caan, and Michael Anderson, Jr, and Major Dundee, directed by Peckinpah, with Charlton Heston in the lead role.

Berger and Verhoeven started their own film production company in 1965, and married in 1966. Berger continued to develop her European career in France and Italy.

In 1966, Berger co-starred with Kirk Douglas in the film Cast a Giant Shadow. Berger played the role of Magda, a soldier in the Israeli army during the 1948 Arab–Israeli War. Also in 1966, the British film Our Man in Marrakesh, called Bang, Bang, You're Dead in the U.S., was released, starring Senta Berger opposite Tony Randall. In The Quiller Memorandum, a third film of hers released in 1966, she played opposite Max von Sydow and George Segal in the role of a German schoolteacher involved in neo-Nazi activity. In 1967, Berger acted in the pilot film for the Robert Wagner television series It Takes a Thief, which aired on the U.S. television network ABC on 9 January 1968. She reprised her role in the series in October 1969, in an episode in which her character was killed.

In 1970, Berger starred for the first time in a film produced by her own company and directed by her husband. Other internationally successful films made by their joint production company included, Die weiße Rose (1982), The Nasty Girl (1990) and My Mother's Courage (1995). In 1971, Berger participated in the media campaign "We've had abortions!" launched by German feminist Alice Schwarzer with a cover story in the Stern political magazine. In 1972, she also campaigned for Willy Brandt's Social Democratic Party.

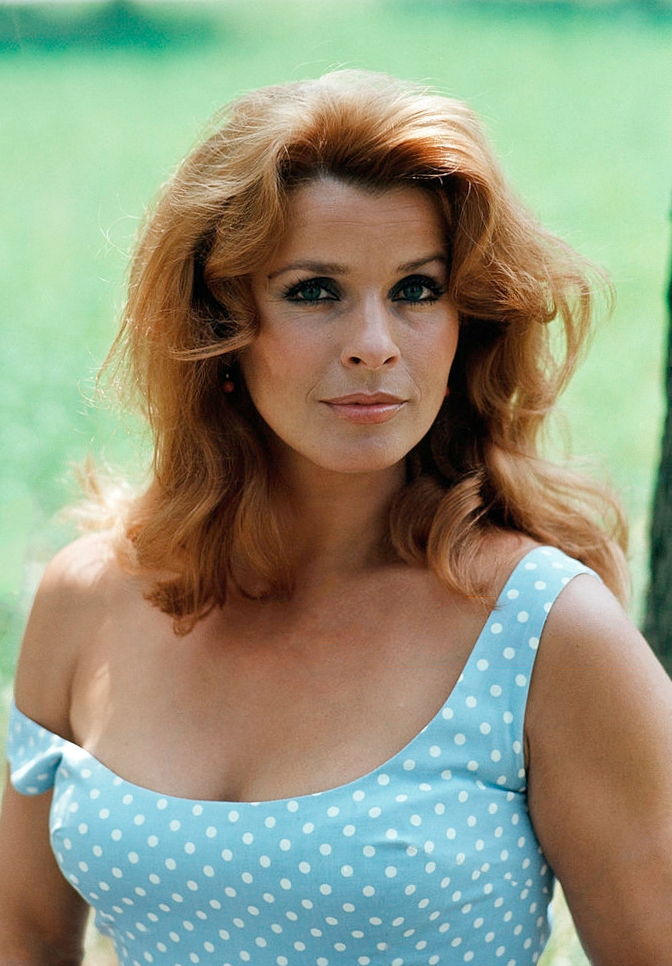
Berger in 1975

Following the birth of her first son, Berger soon returned to theatre work. She played at the Burgtheater in Vienna, at the Thalia Theater in Hamburg, and at the Schiller Theater in Berlin. Between 1974 and 1982, she played the Buhlschaft in the play Jedermann at the Salzburg Festival with Curd Jürgens and Maximilian Schell. She also acted alongside Schell and James Coburn in a supporting role in the acclaimed war film Cross of Iron (1977), reuniting her again with director Sam Peckinpah. In 1977, she was head of the jury at the 27th Berlin International Film Festival. Twenty-one years later, she was part of the jury at the 48th Berlin International Film Festival.

In 1985 and 1986, Berger started a comeback for German-speaking audiences in the TV serial Kir Royal. Further serial hits followed, including Die schnelle Gerdi (The Fast Gerdi, 1989–2002), in which she played a taxi driver. In the same year, she also began a singing career. From 2003 to 2010, Berger was president of the German Film Academy, which seeks to support the careers of actors and actresses in Germany and across Europe. Since 2005, the academy assigns the annual German Film Awards, or Lolas.

In 2005 she appeared in the film, Einmal so wie ich will (Once According to My Will), as a woman trapped in an unhappy marriage, who finds love on holiday, but turns her back on the relationship. In 2016, she played one of the leading roles in the film Welcome to Germany, written and directed by her son Simon Verhoeven. The film grossed more than US$20 million, making it the most successful German picture of the year. It also won numerous awards, among them the Deutscher Filmpreis, the peace award Friedenspreis des deutschen Films, and was nominated for a European Film Award for Best Comedy.

She played the role of Doctor Eva Maria Prohacek in the popular German crime television series Unter Verdacht (Under Suspicion) from 2002 till March 2020, when she retired from the role.

In June 2023, her romantic dramedy Remember Me (Weißt du noch; screenplay by Martin Rauhaus, directed by Rainer Kaufmann) premiered at the 40th Filmfest München.

For her second screen collaboration with her writer/director son Simon Verhoeven will be in the bestseller adaptation of Joachim Meyerhoff's Ach, diese Lücke, diese entsetzliche Lücke. Berger is playing the female lead in this film, which will be released by Warner Bros. in 2026. She won the German Film Award Lola for Best Female Lead Role on 29 May 2026.

== Memoirs ==
In the spring of 2006, Berger's autobiography was published in Germany: Ich habe ja gewußt, daß ich fliegen kann (I Knew that I Could Fly). Among her memories of Hollywood are a less-than-subtle attempt by Darryl Zanuck to get her on his casting couch, and of all the shallow people she met in Hollywood.

== Personal life ==
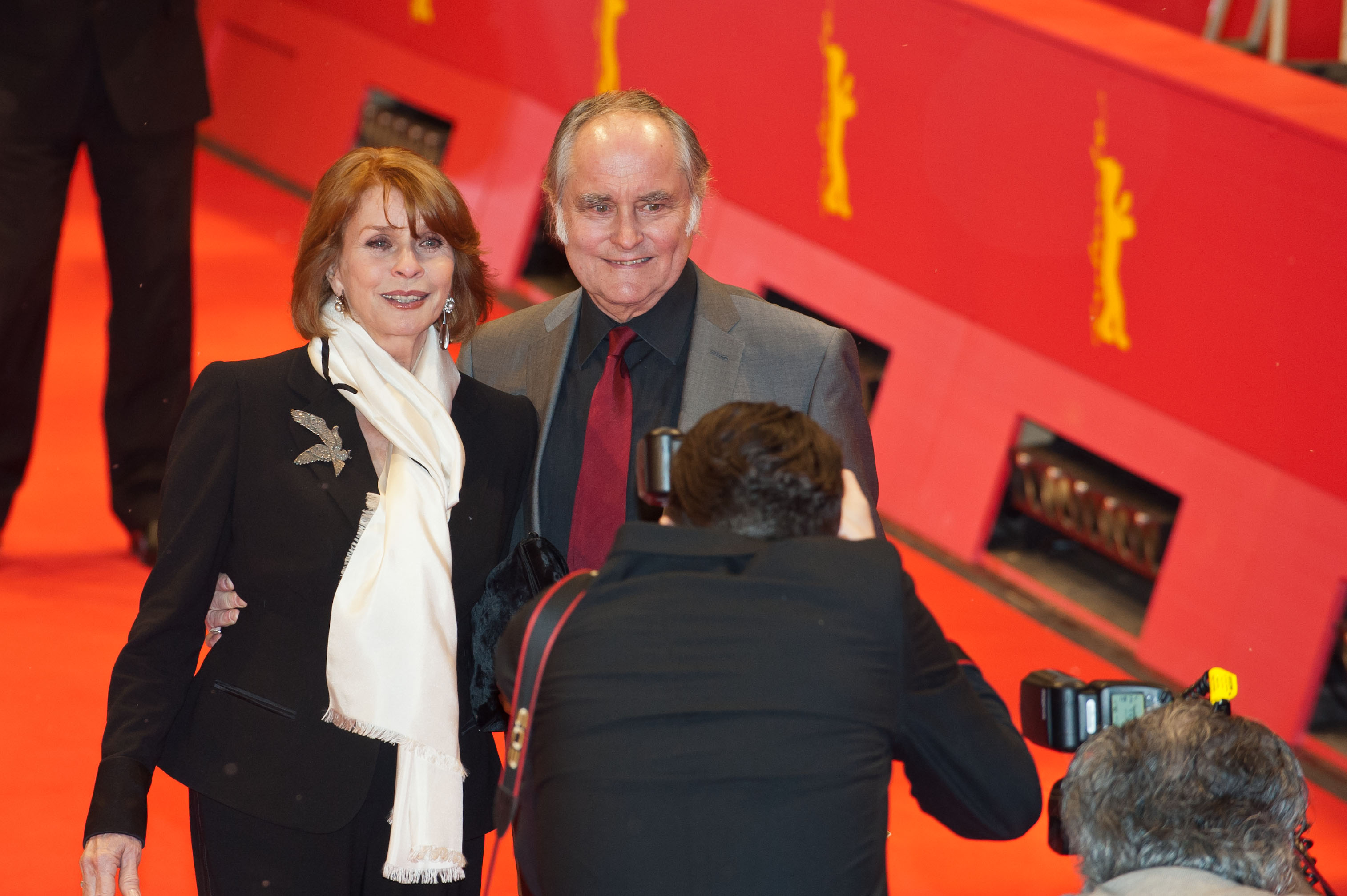
Berger with her husband, Michael Verhoeven, in 2013

Berger was married to German film director Michael Verhoeven from 1966 until his death in 2024; their sons are actor-director Simon Verhoeven (born 1972) and actor/producer Luca Verhoeven (born 1979). She lives in Germany.

== Selected filmography ==
=== Film ===
Year	Film	Role	Director	Notes
1957	The Unexcused Hour	Charge als Gymnasialschülerin	Willi Forst	
1959	The Journey	Serving Girl in Black Scarf	Anatole Litvak	
1960	The Good Soldier Schweik	Gretl	Axel von Ambesser	
1960	I'm Marrying the Director	Vera Bleichinger	Wolfgang Liebeneiner	
1960	O sole mio	Madeleine	Paul Martin	
1961	The Secret Ways	Elsa	Phil Karlson	
1961	The Miracle of Father Malachia	Yvonne Krüger	Bernhard Wicki	
1961	Adieu, Lebewohl, Goodbye	Gaby	Paul Martin	
1961	Always Trouble with the Bed	Rosemarie Schulze	Rudolf Schündler	
1961	It Can't Always Be Caviar	Chantal	Géza von Radványi	
1961	This Time It Must Be Caviar	Chantal	Géza von Radványi	
1961	One Prettier Than the Other	Lilly Haase	Axel von Ambesser	
1962	The Secret of the Black Trunk	Susan Brown	Werner Klingler	
1962	Doctor Sibelius	Elisabeth Sibelius	Rudolf Jugert	
1962	Das Testament des Dr. Mabuse	Nelly	Werner Klingler	
1962	Sherlock Holmes and the Deadly Necklace	Mrs. Ellen Blackburn	Terence Fisher	
1963	The Victors	Trudi	Carl Foreman	
1963	Kali Yug: Goddess of Vengeance	Catherine Talbot	Mario Camerini	
1963	The Mystery of the Indian Temple	Catherine Talbot	Mario Camerini	
1963	Jack and Jenny	Jenny	Victor Vicas	
1964	Full Hearts and Empty Pockets	Jane	Camillo Mastrocinque	
1964	The Spy with My Face	Serena	John Newland	The Man from U.N.C.L.E.
1965	Major Dundee	Teresa Santiago	Sam Peckinpah	
1965	Shots in Threequarter Time	Captain Jenny Bedford	Alfred Weidenmann	
1965	The Glory Guys	Lou Woddard	Arnold Laven	
1966	Cast a Giant Shadow	Magda Simon	Melville Shavelson	
1966	Our Man in Marrakesh	Kyra Stanovy	Don Sharp	
1966	The Poppy Is Also a Flower	Dancer	Terence Young	
1966	Long Legs, Long Fingers	Doris Holberg	Alfred Vohrer	
1966	The Quiller Memorandum	Inge Lindt	Michael Anderson	
1966	The Treasure of San Gennaro	Maggie	Dino Risi	
1967	To Commit a Murder	Gertraud Sphax	Édouard Molinaro	
1967	The Ambushers	Francesca Madeiros	Henry Levin	Matt Helm film series
1967	Diabolically Yours	Christiane	Julien Duvivier	
1969	If It's Tuesday, This Must Be Belgium	London Saleswoman	Mel Stuart	Cameo
1969	Les Étrangers	May	Jean-Pierre Desagnat	
1969	De Sade	Anne de Montreuil	Cy Endfield	
1969	Giacomo Casanova: Childhood and Adolescence	Giulietta Cavamacchia	Luigi Comencini	
1970	Lonely Hearts	Giovanna	Franco Giraldi	
1970	When Women Had Tails	Filli	Pasquale Festa Campanile	
1971	He Who Loves in a Glass House	Hanna	Michael Verhoeven	
1971	Le Saut de l'ange	Sylvaine Orsini	Yves Boisset	
1971	Roma Bene	Princess Dedé Marescalli	Carlo Lizzani	
1971	Lover of the Great Bear	Fela	Valentino Orsini	
1972	Cause of Divorce	Enrica Sebastiani	Marcello Fondato	
1972	Die Moral der Ruth Halbfass	Ruth Halbfass	Volker Schlöndorff	
1973	Merry-Go-Round	The wife	Otto Schenk	
1973	The Scarlet Letter	Hester Prynne	Wim Wenders	
1973	Hospitals: The White Mafia	Suor Maria	Luigi Zampa	
1973	Amore e ginnastica	Maria Pedani	Luigi Filippo D'Amico	
1974	Puzzle	Sara Grimaldi	Duccio Tessari	
1974	La bellissima estate	Manuela	Sergio Martino	
1976	MitGift	Alice Burgmann	Michael Verhoeven	
1976	The Swiss Conspiracy	Denise Abbott	Jack Arnold	
1976	Diary of a Passion	Roberta	Decio Silla	
1976	Goodnight, Ladies and Gentlemen	Signora Palese		Anthology film
1977	The Chinese Miracle	Detta Gaspardi	Wolfgang Liebeneiner	
1977	Cross of Iron	Eva	Sam Peckinpah	
1978	Nest of Vipers	Carla Richter	Tonino Cervi	
1985	Fatto su misura	Signora Schwartz	Francesco Laudadio	
1985	The Two Lives of Mattia Pascal	Clara	Mario Monicelli	
1986	Killing Cars	Marie Landauer	Michael Verhoeven	
1990	Tre colonne in cronaca	Countess Odessa Bonaveri	Carlo Vanzina	
1998	Am I Beautiful?	Unna	Doris Dörrie	
2009	Like It or Not	Dorothea	Ben Verbong	
2010	Colors in the Dark	Anita	Sophie Heldman	
2012	Zettl	Mona Mödlinger	Helmut Dietl	
2012	Glory: A Tale of Mistaken Identities	Rosalie	Isabel Kleefeld	
2016	Welcome to Germany	Angelika Hartmann	Simon Verhoeven	
2023	Remember Me	Marianne	Rainer Kaufmann	
2026	Ach, diese Lücke, diese entsetzliche Lücke	Inge	Simon Verhoeven	

=== Television ===
Year	Title	Role	Notes
1963	Walt Disney's Wonderful World of Color: The Waltz King	Henriette Treffz	
1964	The Man From U.N.C.L.E.: The Double Affair	Serena	(TV series, 1 episode)
1964	See How They Run	Orlando Miller	
1968	The Name of the Game	Mariette Bern	1x04 Collectors' Edition
1968	It Takes a Thief: A Thief Is a Thief	Claire Vickers	(TV series, 1 episode)
1968	Istanbul Express	Mila Darvos	
1968	Babeck	Susanne Stefan	(TV miniseries, 3 episodes)
1969	It Takes a Thief: Flowers from Alexander	Claire Vickers/Laurie James	(TV series, 1 episode)
1976	Perry Como's Christmas in Austria	Guest star as Herself	(TV Holiday special show)
1986	Kir Royal	Mona	(TV series, 6 episodes)
1989	Die schnelle Gerdi	Gerdi	(TV series, 6 episodes)
1990	La belle Anglaise		(TV series, 1 episode)
1992	Sie und Er	Charlotte	
1992	Lilli Lottofee	Lilli	(TV series, 6 episodes)
1994	Captive Love	Anneliese	
1994–1996	Ärzte: Dr. Schwarz und Dr. Martin	Dr. Margarethe Martin	(TV series, 8 episodes)
1995	Die Nacht der Nächte	Teresa	
1995	Kommissar Rex	Karla Wilke	(TV series, 1 episode)
1996	Mein Sohn ist kein Mörder!	Sarah Renzi	
1997	Kap der Rache	Lilian	
1997	Lamorte	Susa	
1997	Bella Ciao	Teresa	
1998	Mammamia	Clara	
1999	Liebe und weitere Katastrophen	Franziska Ackermann	(TV miniseries, 4 episodes)
1999	Nancherrow	Alex Gower	
1999	At Fifty Men Kiss Differently	Marie Mechlenburg	
2000	Zimmer mit Frühstück	Elisabeth	
2000	Trennungsfieber	Dr. Carla Severin-Bauer	
2000	Scharf aufs Leben	Solveigh Kronberg	
2000	Probieren Sie's mit einem Jüngeren	Anna	
2002–2019	Unter Verdacht	Dr. Eva-Maria Prohacek	(TV series, 30 episodes)
2002	Bis dass dein Tod uns scheidet	Edith Mosbach	
2004	Die schnelle Gerdi und die Hauptstadt	Gerdi	(TV series, 6 episodes)
2004	Die Konferenz	Cornelia Cordes	
2005	Einmal so wie ich will	Emma Bauer	
2005	Emilia – Die zweite Chance	Dr. Emilia Seiler	
2005	Emilia – Familienbande	Dr. Emilia Seiler	
2006	Nette Nachbarn küsst man nicht	Helga Forstmann	
2008	Rosamunde Pilcher: Four Seasons	Julia Combe	(TV miniseries, 4 episodes)
2009	Sleepless	Carla Sagmeister	
2009	Frau Böhm sagt Nein	Rita Böhm	
2009	Mama kommt!	Luise Fischer	
2010	Liebe am Fjord: Das Ende der Eiszeit	Pernille	(TV series, 1 episode)
2011	In the Prime of Life	Erika Welves	
2012	Operation Sugar	Dorothee Lessing	(TV thriller)
2012	Hochzeiten	Klara	
2013	Und alle haben geschwiegen	Luisa Hamilton	(TV drama)
2013	Welcome to the Countryside!	Rita	(TV drama)
2014	Autumn Tingles: Speed Dating for Silver Hairs	Maria Koppel	(TV film)
2020	Martha und Tommy	Martha	(TV drama)
2021	An seiner Seite	Charlotte Kler	(TV Drama)

== Honors and awards ==
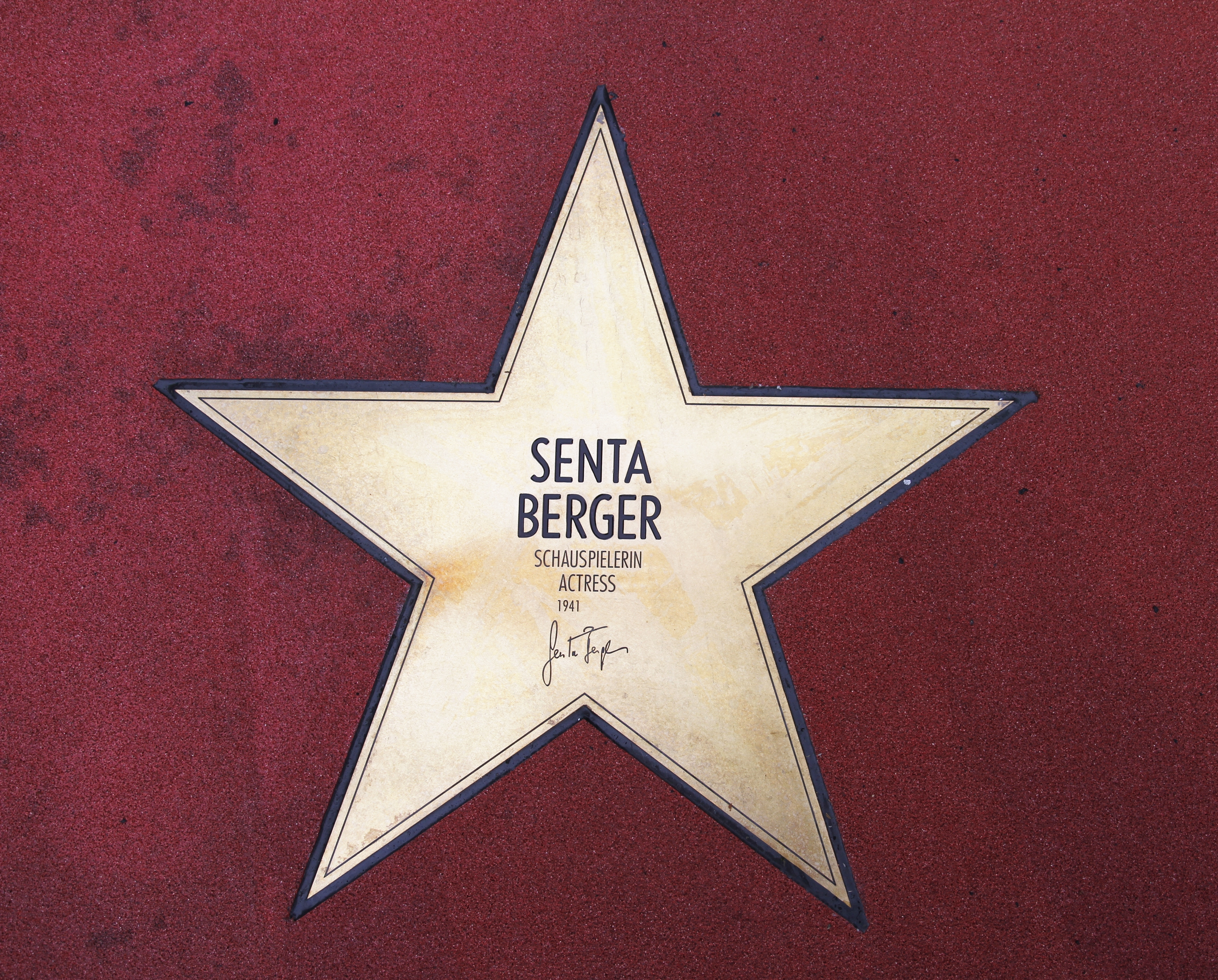
Berger's star on Berlin's Boulevard of Stars (2011)

- Bambi Prize (1968)
- Bravo Otto in Bronze (1969)
- Film Award in Silver (production) for Die Weiße Rose on behalf of the film company Sentana (1983)
- German Actor Award (Chaplin-shoe) for her role in Kir Royal (1987)
- Bambi Prize, Special Bambi "Unknockable Stars" (1990)
- Golden Gong (1996)
- Austrian Cross of Honour for Science and Art, 1st class (1999)
- Karl Valentin Order (1998)
- Golden Romy as the most popular actress (1998)
- Bambi Prize in the category for the ARD miniseries Love and Other Catastrophes (1999)
- Federal Cross of Merit (1999)
- Bavarian Order of Merit (2002)
- German Hörbuchpreis (2003)
- Medal Munich shines (for outstanding service to Munich) (2003)
- Hessian TV award as an ensemble member of the film The Conference (2005)
- Golden Ox – Honorary Award of the Film Arts Festival Mecklenburg-Vorpommern to the Sentana Film Production Senta Berger and Michael Verhoeven (2005)
- Billy Wilder Award (2006)
- Platinum Romy for lifetime achievement (2007)
- Special Prize of the German TV crime Award for her starring role in the WDR production Schlaflos ("Sleepless") (2009)
- Herbert-Strate Prize of the NRW Film Foundation and the Association HDF Kino Cinema (2009)
- German Television Award for Best Actress for her leading role in Schlaflos (2009)
- Special Prize at the Television Film Festival in Baden-Baden for outstanding dramatic performance in Frau Böhm sagt Nein (2009)
- Golden Camera Award in the category Best Actress in German Frau Böhm sagt Nein and Schlaflos (2010)
- Adolf Grimme Award for her performance in Frau Böhm sagt Nein (2010)
- Bavarian Television Award for best actress says in the "TV Movie" for her role in the film Frau Böhm sagt Nein (2010)
- Grand Diagonale drama prize for lifetime achievement (2010)
- Star on the Boulevard of Stars in Berlin (2010)
- Hans Abich Award for outstanding services in television and film (Television Film Festival, Baden-Baden, 2010)
- Cultural Honor Prize of the City of Munich (2011)
- Bear (B.Z. culture prize) (2012)
- German Film Award Golden Lola for Best Female Lead Role in Ach, diese Lücke, diese entsetzliche Lücke
