= It Can't Always Be Caviar =

1961 film

- Directed by: Géza von Radványi
- Written by: Henri Jeanson; Jean Ferry; Paul Andréota
- Based on: It Can't Always Be Caviar by Johannes Mario Simmel
- Produced by: Artur Brauner
- Starring: O.W. Fischer; Eva Bartok; Senta Berger
- Cinematography: Friedl Behn-Grund; Göran Strindberg
- Edited by: Walter Wischniewsky
- Music by: Rolf A. Wilhelm
- Production companies: CCC Film; Comptoir d'Expansion Cinématographique
- Distributed by: Europa-Filmverleih
- Release date: 18 October 1961
- Running time: 106 minutes
- Countries: France; West Germany
- Language: German

It Can't Always Be Caviar (German: Es muss nicht immer Kaviar sein) is a 1961 French-West German comedy thriller film directed by Géza von Radványi and starring O.W. Fischer, Eva Bartok and Senta Berger. It was shot at the Spandau Studios in West Berlin. The film's sets were designed by the art directors Hertha Hareiter and Otto Pischinger. It is based on the 1960 novel of the same title by the Austrian writer Johannes Mario Simmel. It was followed be a sequel film This Time It Must Be Caviar, released later the same year. In 1977 a television adaptation of the novel was produced.

== Synopsis ==
In 1939 before the outbreak of the Second World War, half-German London bank clerk Thomas Lieven travels to Berlin on a business trip. While there he is recruited by the Abwehr, who mistakenly believe he is already working for British intelligence and wish him to be a double agent.

Back in England he reveals what has taken place and joins their organisation. Sent to Paris he also finds himself recruited by the French secret service. Matters escalate further when war breaks out and in 1940 German forces advance on Paris.

== Cast ==
- O.W. Fischer as Thomas Lieven
- Eva Bartok as Vera
- Senta Berger as Chantal
- Geneviève Cluny as Mimi Chambert
- Jean Richard as Oberst Siméon
- Geneviève Kervine as Nancy
- Viktor de Kowa as Loos
- Werner Peters as Feldwebel Zumbusch
- Wolfgang Reichmann as Dr. Hofbauer
- Fritz Tillmann as General von Felseneck
- Karl Schönböck as Lovejoy
- Peter Carsten as Bastian
- Günter Meisner as Redner auf Platz
- Hans W. Hamacher as Kommissar Denis
- Werner Finck as Dr. Beck
- Axel von Ambesser as Narrator

== Bibliography ==
- Elsaesser, Thomas & Wedel, Michael . The BFI companion to German cinema. British Film Institute, 1999.
- Jacobsen, Wolfgang. Käutner. Spiess, 1992.
