= The Last Pedestrian =

1960 film

- Theatrical film poster
- Directed by: Wilhelm Thiele
- Written by: Wilhelm Thiele; Eckart Hachfeld
- Produced by: Otto Meissner
- Starring: Heinz Erhardt; Christine Kaufmann; Käthe Haack
- Cinematography: Kurt Grigoleit
- Edited by: Martha Dübber
- Music by: Franz Grothe
- Production company: Deutsche Film Hansa
- Distributed by: Deutsche Film Hansa
- Release date: 15 September 1960
- Running time: 87 minutes
- Country: West Germany
- Language: German

The Last Pedestrian (German: Der letzte Fussgänger) is a 1960 West German comedy film directed by Wilhelm Thiele and starring Heinz Erhardt, Christine Kaufmann and Käthe Haack. It was shot at the Göttingen Studios. The film's sets were designed by the art director Walter Haag.

== Cast ==
- Heinz Erhardt as Gottlieb Sänger
- Christine Kaufmann as Christine Cornelius
- Käthe Haack as Frau von Hartwig
- Ernst Waldow as Dr. Zollhöfer
- Hans Hessling as Editor-in-chief Kleinert
- Michael Lenz as Rudi
- Peter Wegen as Max
- Willy Reichert as Schützenwirt Weber
- Harry Tagore as Indian prince
- Lucie Englisch as Frau Huppert
- Blandine Ebinger as Henriette
- Trude Herr as woman on the train
- Günther Ungeheuer as photojournalist Pit
- Werner Finck as Redakteur Hiss
- Willy Heyer as Karl, Italian tourist
- Käte Jaenicke as Italian tourist
- Kurt Klopsch as Italian tourist
- Eduard Linkers as man in the Mercedes
- Josef Meinertzhagen as innkeeper
- Phoebe Monnard as Italian tourist
- Bruno W. Pantel as Spanish tourist
- Kurt Pratsch-Kaufmann as Jean-Jacques Martell, tour guide
- Egon Vogel as Spanish tourist
- Jörg von Liebenfelß as Kurt Eggert
