= The Perfect Couple (1954 film) =

1954 film directed by Robert A. Stemmle

- Directed by: Robert A. Stemmle
- Written by: Gerda Corbett; Jacques Königstein; Robert A. Stemmle
- Starring: Ingeborg Körner; Hans Reiser; Peter Mosbacher
- Cinematography: Igor Oberberg
- Edited by: Walter Wischniewsky
- Music by: Heinz Gietz
- Production company: Norddeutsche Filmproduktion
- Distributed by: Allianz Filmverleih
- Release date: 21 January 1954
- Running time: 95 minutes
- Country: West Germany
- Language: German

The Perfect Couple (German: Das ideale Brautpaar) is a 1954 West German romantic comedy film directed by Robert A. Stemmle and starring Ingeborg Körner, Hans Reiser, and Peter Mosbacher.

The film's sets were designed by the art directors Karl Vollbrecht and Wilhelm Vorwerg. It was shot on location in Berlin and Cologne.

== Cast ==
- Ingeborg Körner as Henny Schubert, Handelsschülerin
- Hans Reiser as Harald Wandel, Gebrauchtwagenhändler
- Peter Mosbacher as Alfred Tausendfreund, Finanzier
- Lucie Mannheim as Alwine Steingass
- Hilde Weissner as Ina Wandel, Haralds Mutter
- Günther Lüders as Walter Schlüter, Inhaber der Tierhandlung
- Blandine Ebinger as Wally Engelschalk, Sekretärin
- Elisabeth Flickenschildt as Baronin Windschildt, Heiratsvermittlerin
- Ernst Schröder as Dr. Martini
- Lonny Kellner as Uschi Marek, Kinokartenverküferin
- Hans Dieter Zeidler as Hans Krümmel, Mechaniker
- Liane Croon as Felicitas Martini
- Frans de Munck as Jürgen Busse, Torwart
- Karin Evans as Mutter Martini
- Michael Cramer as Peter Bach
- Gert Günther Hoffmann as Klaus Peter Hörrmann
- Jacques Königstein as Rundfunkmoderator
- Maria Sebaldt
- Ursula von Manescul
- Lilo Herbeth
- Giselle Vesco
- Maria Secher
- Heinz Welzel
- Walter Tarrach
- Otto Matthies
- Wolf Harnisch
- Albert Bessler
- Heike Balzer
- Reni Kamberg as Sängerin
- Gitta Lind as Sängerin
- Bruce Low as Sänger
- Adalbert Luczkowski as himself, conductor
- Willi Schneider as Sänger
- Das Sunshine-Quartet as Sänger

== Bibliography ==
- Bock, Hans-Michael; Bergfelder, Tim, eds. (2009). The Concise Cinegraph: Encyclopaedia of German Cinema. New York: Berghahn Books. ISBN 978-1-57181-655-9.
