= Maximilian von Laffert =

Saxon officer and General of Cavalry

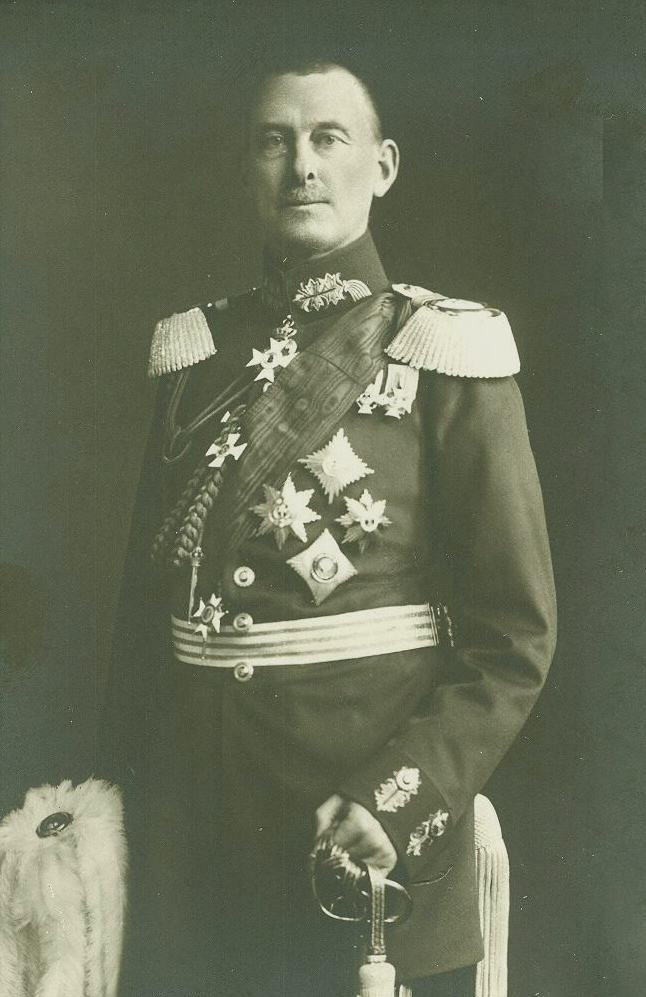
- Maximilian von Laffert during WWI
- Born: 10 May 1855; Lindau, Kingdom of Bavaria
- Died: 20 July 1917 (aged 62); Frankfurt am Main, Kingdom of Prussia
- Military career
- Allegiance: German Empire
- Branch: Heer
- Service years: 1871–1917
- Rank: General of Cavalry
- Commands: Karabinier-Regiment (2. Schweres Regiment); Königlich Sächsisches Garde-Reiter-Regiment (1. Schweres Regiment); 32. Kavallerie-Brigade (3. Königlich Sächsische); 23. Kavallerie-Brigade (1. Königlich Sächsische); 40. Infanterie-Division (4. Königlich Sächsische); XIX. (II. Königlich Sächsisches) Armeekorps
- Conflicts: World War I
- Awards: Pour le Mérite

Maximilian August Hermann Julius von Laffert (10 May 1855 in Lindau – 20 July 1917 in Frankfurt am Main) was a Saxon officer, later General of Cavalry during World War I. He was a recipient of the Pour le Mérite.

== World War One ==
von Laffert commanded XIX Corps, apart of the Third Army, during the opening campaign in 1914.

During the attacks on 30 August 1914 his XIX Corps attacked French positions around La Sabotterie (24th Infantry Division) and Tourteron (40th Infantry Division).

On 1 September 40th Division of XIX Corps crossed the Aisne at Givry becoming engaged in a "brief but sharp battle" before pushing onto Chardeny from the crossing and from Attigny.

== Died ==
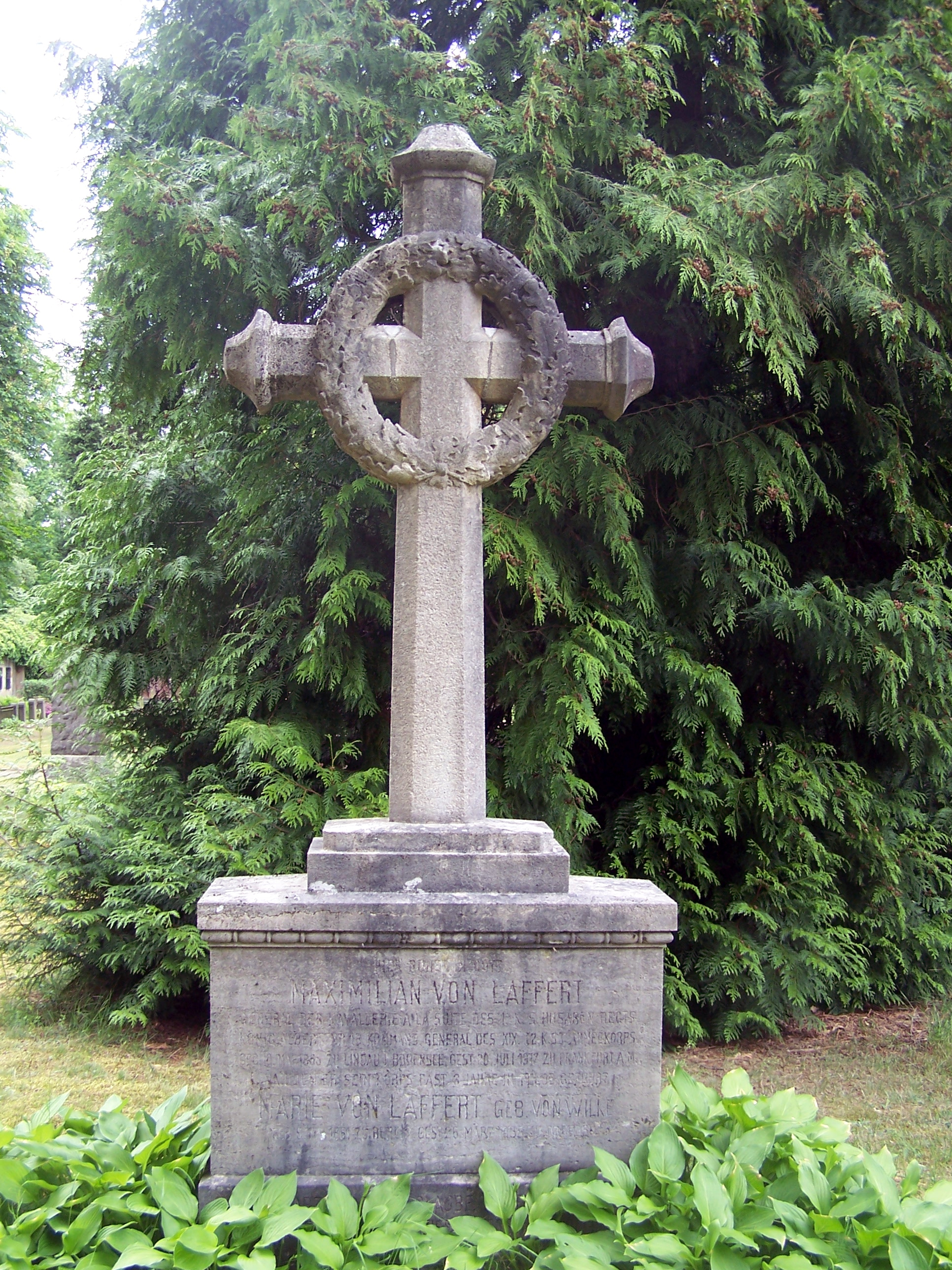
The tomb of Maximilian von Laffert in the Nordfriedhof of Dresden

Maximilian von Laffert suffered a heart attack while commanding his troops in France and died later in Frankfurt on 20 July 1917. He is interred at the Nordfriedhof in Dresden.

== Awards ==
- Iron Cross of 1914, 1st and 2nd class
- Pour le Mérite (1 September 1916)
- Order of the Crown, 4th class (Prussia)
- Commander 2nd class of the Military Order of St. Henry (31 July 1916); previously awarded the Knight's Cross on 9 September 1914
- Order of the Red Eagle, 4th class
- Commander of the House Order of the White Falcon
- Commander 1st class of the Albert Order
- Commander 2nd class of the Saxe-Ernestine House Order
- Commander, 1st Class of the Civil Order of Saxony
- Service Award (Saxony)
- Military Merit Order, 2nd class with star (Bavaria)
- Commander, 1st Class of the Order of Henry the Lion (Brunswick)
- Knight's Cross, 1st Class of the Friedrich Order (Württemberg)
