= Brandenburg Division =

1960 film

- Directed by: Harald Philipp
- Written by: Harald Philipp
- Produced by: Willy Zeyn
- Starring: Hanns Ernst Jäger; Wolfgang Reichmann; Heinz Weiss
- Cinematography: Heinz Hölscher
- Edited by: Elisabeth Kleinert-Neumann
- Music by: Hans-Martin Majewski
- Production company: Willy Zeyn-Film
- Distributed by: Schorcht Filmverleih
- Release date: 15 September 1960
- Running time: 104 minutes
- Country: West Germany
- Language: German

Brandenburg Division (German: Division Brandenburg) is a 1960 West German war film directed by Harald Philipp and starring Hanns Ernst Jäger, Wolfgang Reichmann and Heinz Weiss. It depicts members of the German commando unit Brandenburgers during the Second World War.

The film's sets were designed by the art directors Otto Erdmann and Hans Jürgen Kiebach.

== Cast ==
- Hanns Ernst Jäger as Jonas
- Wolfgang Reichmann as Ungerland
- Peter Neusser as Pflug
- Heinz Weiss as Dörner
- Klaus Kindler as Czerny
- Helmut Oeser as Kugelmann
- Gudrun Schmidt as Nina
- Monika Weydert as Magret
- Theo Tecklenburg as Derndorff
- Kurd Pieritz as Markwitz
- Bert Sotlar as Popoff
- Stanislav Ledinek as Mitropoulos
- Jean-Jacques Delbo as Secret Service Man
- Howard Vernon as Secret Service Man
- Kurt Waitzmann as 1. Offizier
- Georg Lehn as Polizeiführer
- Willy Schäfer as Russischer Offizier

== Bibliography ==
- Giesen, Rolf. Nazi Propaganda Films: A History and Filmography. McFarland, 2003.
