= Hanns Ernst Jäger =

German actor (1910–1973)

- Born: 1 January 1910
- Died: 15 August 1973 (aged 63)
- Occupation: Actor
- Years active: 1958–1972

Hanns Ernst Jäger (1 January 1910 – 15 August 1973) was a German actor. He appeared in more than 50 films and television shows between 1958 and 1972.

== Filmography ==
Year	Title	Role	Notes
1955	Dunja	Oseip	
1959	The Forests Sing Forever	Der Hoveländer	
1960	Brandenburg Division	Schwanecke	
1960	The Time Has Come	Dr. Robert Stevens	3 episodes
1961	The Marriage of Mr. Mississippi	Schlender	
1965	Der Kardinal von Spanien	Kaplan Ortega	
1968	The Castle	Landlord	
1969	Hotel Royal	René Blair	TV film
1971	The Eddie Chapman Story	Gefängnisdirektor	TV film
