= Every Day Isn't Sunday (1959 film) =

1959 film

- Directed by: Helmut Weiss
- Written by: Volodja Semitjov (novel); Kurt Heuser; Werner E. Hintz
- Produced by: Kurt Ulrich
- Starring: Elisabeth Müller; Paul Hubschmid; Dietmar Schönherr
- Cinematography: Georg Bruckbauer
- Edited by: Klaus Eckstein
- Music by: Raimund Rosenberger
- Production company: Kurt Ulrich Film
- Distributed by: Deutsche Film Hansa
- Release date: 12 August 1959
- Running time: 10 minutes
- Country: West Germany
- Language: German

Every Day Isn't Sunday (German: Alle Tage ist kein Sonntag) is a 1959 West German comedy film directed by Helmut Weiss and starring Elisabeth Müller, Paul Hubschmid and Dietmar Schönherr. The title refers to a traditional song by Carl Clewing which features in the film.

The film's sets were designed by the art directors Willi Herrmann and Karl Schneider. It was made at the Tempelhof Studios in West Berlin with location shooting also taking place around Freiburg im Breisgau in the Black Forest.

== Plot ==
While Eva is in the hospital after an accident, her son, Peter, goes in search of his long-missing father. Learning he has died, Peter then prepares himself for the new man in his mother's life.

== Cast ==
- Elisabeth Müller as Eva Kende
- Paul Hubschmid as Karl Brandtstetter
- Dietmar Schönherr as Mitja Burganoff
- Jochen Hanke as Peter
- Jürgen Hanke as Paul
- Trude Herr as Fanny Knöbel
- Ralf Wolter as Dienstmann Huber
- Walter Janssen as Franz, Diener bei Brandtstelter
- Christa Williams as Barsängerin
- Jur Arten as Wladimir
- Rolf Weih as Gregor
- Hans Leibelt as Dr. Börger
- Cora Roberts as Olga
- Kurt Pratsch-Kaufmann as Mann mit Waldhorn
- Stanislav Ledinek as Agent Pacher
- Blandine Ebinger as Frau Hertel
- Willy Millowitsch as Mann mit Bombardon

== Bibliography ==
- James L. Limbacher. Haven't I seen you somewhere before?: Remakes, sequels, and series in motion pictures and television, 1896-1978. Pierian Press, 1979.
