= Adieu, Lebewohl, Goodbye =

1961 film directed by Paul Martin

- Directed by: Paul Martin
- Written by: Gustav Kampendonk; Paul Martin
- Produced by: Artur Brauner
- Starring: Bibi Johns; Senta Berger; Trude Herr
- Cinematography: Ernst W. Kalinke; Hans Schneeberger
- Edited by: Jutta Hering
- Music by: Gert Wilden
- Production company: Alfa Film
- Distributed by: Gloria Film
- Release date: 29 August 1961
- Running time: 102 minutes
- Country: West Germany
- Language: German

Adieu, Lebewohl, Goodbye is a 1961 West German musical film directed by Paul Martin and starring Bibi Johns, Senta Berger and Trude Herr. It was shot using a mixture of Agfacolor and Eastmancolor at the Spandau Studios in West Berlin and on location in Naples. The film's sets were designed by the art directors Paul Markwitz and Wilhelm Vorwerg.

== Synopsis ==
Tilli Adler is the leader of a German troupe of dancers and singers who are about to depart for a Rome for a performance. Once there they get involves in a series of misunderstandings and adventures.

== Cast ==
- Bibi Johns as Singer Eva Moretti
- Senta Berger as Gaby
- Trude Herr as Tilli Adler
- Michael Cramer as Ralph Martell
- Rudolf Platte as Grandfather
- Georg Thomalla as Luciano Moretti
- Bill Ramsey as Fiorelli
- Jaime de Mora y Aragón as Police Captain Bertolli
- Gerhard Hartig as Gaby's Father Rossi
- Kurt Pratsch-Kaufmann as Polizist
- Ralf Wolter as Pietro
- Gerd Frickhöffer as Sänger
- Carlo Angeletti ("Marietto") as Carlo Moretti
- Gus Backus as Singer
- Ralf Bendix as Policeman

== Bibliography ==
- Elsaesser, Thomas & Wedel, Michael . The BFI companion to German cinema. British Film Institute, 1999.
- Hobsch, Manfred . Liebe, Tanz und 1000 Schlagerfilme. Schwarzkopf & Schwarzkopf, 1998.
