= This Time It Must Be Caviar =

1961 film

- Directed by: Géza von Radványi
- Written by: Henri Jeanson; Jean Ferry; Paul Andréota
- Based on: It Can't Always Be Caviar by Johannes Mario Simmel
- Produced by: Artur Brauner
- Starring: O.W. Fischer; Eva Bartok; Senta Berger
- Cinematography: Friedl Behn-Grund
- Edited by: Walter Wischniewsky
- Music by: Rolf A. Wilhelm
- Production companies: CCC Film; Comptoir d'Expansion Cinématographique
- Distributed by: Europa-Filmverleih
- Release date: 1 December 1961
- Running time: 98 minutes
- Countries: France; West Germany
- Language: German

This Time It Must Be Caviar (German: Diesmal muß es Kaviar sein) is a 1961 French-West German comedy thriller film directed by Géza von Radványi and starring O.W. Fischer, Eva Bartok and Senta Berger. It was shot at the Spandau Studios in West Berlin. The film's sets were designed by the art directors Hertha Hareiter and Otto Pischinger. It is a sequel to the 1961 film It Can't Always Be Caviar, adapted from the novel of the same title by Johannes Mario Simmel.

== Cast ==
- O.W. Fischer as Thomas Lieven
- Eva Bartok as Vera
- Senta Berger as Chantal
- Geneviève Cluny as Mimi Chambert
- Jean Richard as Oberst Siméon
- Geneviève Kervine as Nancy
- Viktor de Kowa as Loos
- Wolfgang Reichmann as Dr. Hofbauer
- Karl Schönböck as Lovejoy
- Karl John as Major Debras
- Peter Carsten as Bastian
- Kurt Pratsch-Kaufmann as Gefängnisdirektor
- Reinhard Kolldehoff as Schulz
- Bruno W. Pantel as Oberst

== Bibliography ==
- Dumont, Hervé. Robert Siodmak: le maître du film noir. LÁge dh́omme, 1990.
- Jacobsen, Wolfgang. Käutner. Spiess, 1992.
