= Egon Vogel =

German actor

- Born: 23 July 1908; Berlin, German Empire
- Died: 10 May 1993 (aged 84); Berlin, Germany
- Occupation: Actor
- Years active: 1936-1988 (film & TV)

Egon Vogel (1908–1993) was a German stage, television and film actor. A character actor he amassed over a hundred credits during his career, some of them in minor parts.

== Selected filmography ==
=== Film ===
- Boccaccio (1936)
- The Deruga Case (1938)
- Nanon (1938)
- Robert Koch (1939)
- Bachelor's Paradise (1939)
- D III 88 (1939)
- The Gasman (1941)
- Love Premiere (1943)
- Romance in a Minor Key (1943)
- Marriage of Affection (1944)
- The Woman of My Dreams (1944)
- Die Feuerzangenbowle (1944)
- The Millionaire (1947)
- The Guilt of Doctor Homma (1951)
- Three Days of Fear (1952)
- When The Village Music Plays on Sunday Nights (1953)
- Clivia (1954)
- The Great Test (1954)
- The Abduction of the Sabine Women (1954)
- Teenage Wolfpack (1956)
- The Singing Ringing Tree (1957)
- Taiga (1958)
- The Scarlet Baroness (1959)
- The Last Pedestrian (1960)
- Agatha, Stop That Murdering! (1960)
- Robert and Bertram (1961)
- Life Begins at Eight (1962)
- Stop Train 349 (1963)
- Zwei blaue Vergissmeinnicht (1963)

=== Television ===
- Jedermannstraße 11 (1962–65)
- Meine Schwiegersöhne und ich (1970)

== Bibliography ==
- Giesen, Rolf. Nazi Propaganda Films: A History and Filmography. McFarland, 2003.
