= Café Oriental =

1962 film

- Directed by: Rudolf Schündler
- Written by: Janne Furch
- Produced by: Artur Brauner; Hans Raspotnik
- Starring: Elke Sommer; Jerome Courtland; Trude Herr
- Cinematography: Siegfried Hold
- Edited by: Waltraut Wischniewsky
- Music by: Gert Wilden
- Production company: Alfa Film
- Distributed by: Deutsche Filmvertriebs-Gemeinschaft
- Release date: 16 February 1962
- Running time: 95 minutes
- Country: West Germany
- Language: German

Café Oriental is a 1962 German musical comedy film directed by Rudolf Schündler and starring Elke Sommer, Jerome Courtland, Trude Herr, and Bill Ramsey. It was shot at the Spandau Studios in West Berlin. The film's sets were designed by the art directors Paul Markwitz and Wilhelm Vorwerg.

== Plot ==
Several students at a music college, as well as a waiter and a housekeeper, have made an unusual inheritance, the Café Allotria. The inheritance has only one catch: the café is hopelessly over-indebted. The bailiff is the only permanent guest in the somewhat run-down and boring place.

The motley group of heirs come up with an idea: why not spice up and refurbish the café by offering a music combo that really stirs up the dancing audience? The café will be thoroughly renovated and changed, will be given a Middle Eastern touch and will be called "Café Oriental" from now on. The bailiff, an enthusiastic jazz trumpeter, is also involved. The store soon became a hot spot for music lovers and dance fans.

All the while, love blooms not only between Sylvia, a student of classical music, and Michael, a popular singer, but also between Sylvia's housekeeper Valentine and Bill, the manager.

== Cast ==
- Elke Sommer as Sylvia
- Jerome Courtland as Michael
- Trude Herr as Valentine
- Bill Ramsey as Bill
- Walter Gross as Prof. Marhold
- Kurt Pratsch-Kaufmann as Gerichtsvollzieher
- Barbara Saade as Lilo
- Jonny Buchardt as Albert
- Jean Thomé as Tommy
- Bruno Fritz as Papa Bröseke
- Claus Wilcke as Peter
- Klaus Dahlen as Gert
- Walo Lüönd as Ludwig
- Astrid Haik as Erika
- Peggy Brown as Sängerin, herself
- Gus Backus as Sänger, Himself
- Jimmy Makulis as Sänger, himself
- Rex Gildo as Sänger, himself
- Constanze Vernon as Solotänzerin
- Jürgen Feindt as Solotänzer

== Bibliography ==
- Segrave, Kerry; Martin, Linda (1990). The Continental Actress: European Film Stars of the Postwar Era—Biographies, Criticism, Filmographies, Bibliographies. Jefferson, NC: McFarland. ISBN 978-0-89950-510-7.
