= Doctor Sibelius =

1962 film directed by Rudolf Jugert

- Directed by: Rudolf Jugert
- Written by: Sigmund Bendkover; Artur Brauner; Janne Furch
- Produced by: Artur Brauner; Hans Raspotnik
- Starring: Lex Barker; Barbara Rütting; Senta Berger
- Cinematography: Karl Schröder
- Edited by: Walter Wischniewsky
- Music by: Raimund Rosenberger
- Production company: Alfa Film
- Distributed by: Gloria Film
- Release date: 22 June 1962
- Running time: 98 minutes
- Country: West Germany
- Language: German

Doctor Sibelius (German: Frauenarzt Dr. Sibelius) is a 1962 West German drama film directed by Rudolf Jugert and starring Lex Barker, Barbara Rütting and Senta Berger.

It was shot at the Spandau Studios in Berlin and on location in the city. The film's sets were designed by the art director Paul Markwitz.

== Cast ==
- Lex Barker as Dr. Georg Sibelius
- Barbara Rütting as Sabine Hellmann
- Senta Berger as Elisabeth Sibelius
- Anita Höfer as Susanne Helmann
- Loni Heuser as Mrs. Golling
- Berta Drews as Babette
- Sabine Bethmann as Sister Irene
- Harry Meyen as Dr. Möllendorf
- Rudolf Platte as Berger
- Hans Nielsen as Dr. Reinhardt
- Anneli Sauli as Gitta Hansen
- Elisabeth Flickenschildt as Helene Sebald

== Bibliography ==
- Bock, Hans-Michael; Bergfelder, Tim, eds. (2009). The Concise Cinegraph: Encyclopaedia of German Cinema. Berghahn Books. ISBN 978-1-57181-655-9.
