= Kurt Pratsch-Kaufmann =

German actor

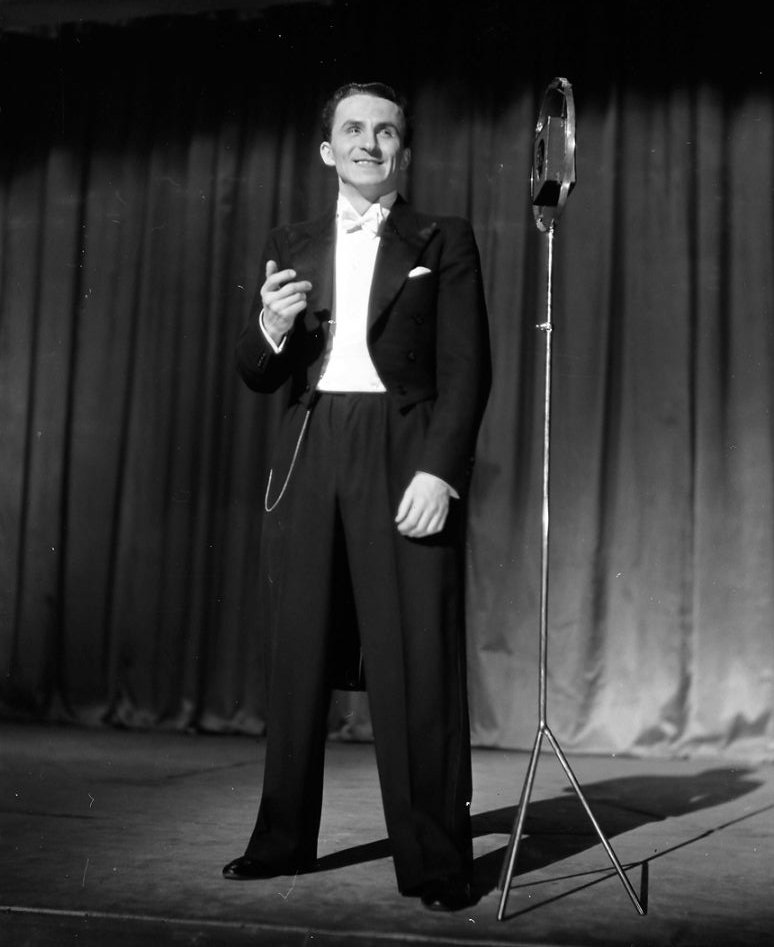
- Pratsch-Kaufmann in 1937
- Born: 1 September 1906; Dresden, Saxony, German Empire
- Died: 24 June 1988 (aged 81); Munich, Bavaria, West Germany
- Occupation: Actor
- Years active: 1950-1982 (film & TV)

Kurt Pratsch-Kaufmann (1906–1988) was a German stage, television and film actor. He was married to the actress Marianne Pohlenz.

== Selected filmography ==
- The Black Forest Girl (1950) - Staubig, Buchhalter
- Herzen im Sturm (1951) - Willy
- Durch dick und dünn (1951) - Tankwart Michel
- Johannes und die 13 Schönheitsköniginnen (1951) - Paul Paschke
- Queen of the Night (1951) - Hoteldetektiv Barak
- The Heath Is Green (1951) - Oberlehrer
- Mikosch Comes In (1952) - Feldwebel Janos
- We'll Talk About Love Later (1953)
- When The Village Music Plays on Sunday Nights (1953) - Dagobert
- The Cousin from Nowhere (1953) - Otto Bauke
- The Big Star Parade (1954) - Wachtmeister #2 (uncredited)
- Schützenliesel (1954)
- Ball at the Savoy (1955) - Johann
- One Woman Is Not Enough? (1955) - Reporter
- Du mein stilles Tal (1955) - Heinrich
- Der Frontgockel (1955) - Wiesböck
- Das Sonntagskind (1956) - Gefängnispförtner
- Die Rosel vom Schwarzwald (1956) - Herr Quast
- Victor and Victoria (1957) - Wurstmaxe
- Kindermädchen für Papa gesucht (1957) - Ansager
- The Big Chance (1957) - Conferencier
- Europas neue Musikparade 1958 (1957) - Kriminalkommissar
- Polikuschka (1958) - Wirt
- Lilli (1958) - Wachtmeister Brauer
- What a Woman Dreams of in Springtime (1959) - Fahrer Otto
- Every Day Isn't Sunday (1959) - Mann mit Waldhorn
- Melodie und Rhythmus (1959) - Filippo
- Das Totenschiff (1959) - (uncredited)
- The Blue Sea and You (1959)
- Boomerang (1960)
- The High Life (1960) - Le facteur
- Bombs on Monte Carlo (1960)
- Marina (1960) - 2. Inspektor
- The Last Pedestrian (1960) - Jean-Jacques Martell, Reiseleiter (uncredited)
- Flimmerparade (1961)
- The Transport (1961) - Wirbel
- Always Trouble with the Bed (1961) - Fleck
- Denn das Weib ist schwach (1961) - Betrunkener
- Adieu, Lebewohl, Goodbye (1961) - Polizist
- Robert and Bertram (1961) - Polizist
- This Time It Must Be Caviar (1961) - Gefängnisdirektor
- Auf Wiedersehen (1961) - Mario Malfi (uncredited)
- Café Oriental (1962) - Gerichtsvollzieher
- So toll wie anno dazumal (1962) - Mandlers Komplize
- Bekenntnisse eines möblierten Herrn (1963) - Vater Zierholt
- Erotik auf der Schulbank (1968)
- St. Pauli Nachrichten: Thema Nr. 1 (1971) - Richter
- Our Willi Is the Best (1971) - Portier beim Fernsehen
- Krawatten für Olympia (1976)

== Bibliography ==
- Peter Cowie & Derek Elley. World Filmography: 1968. Tantivy Press, 1968
