= Wolfgang Reichmann =

German actor

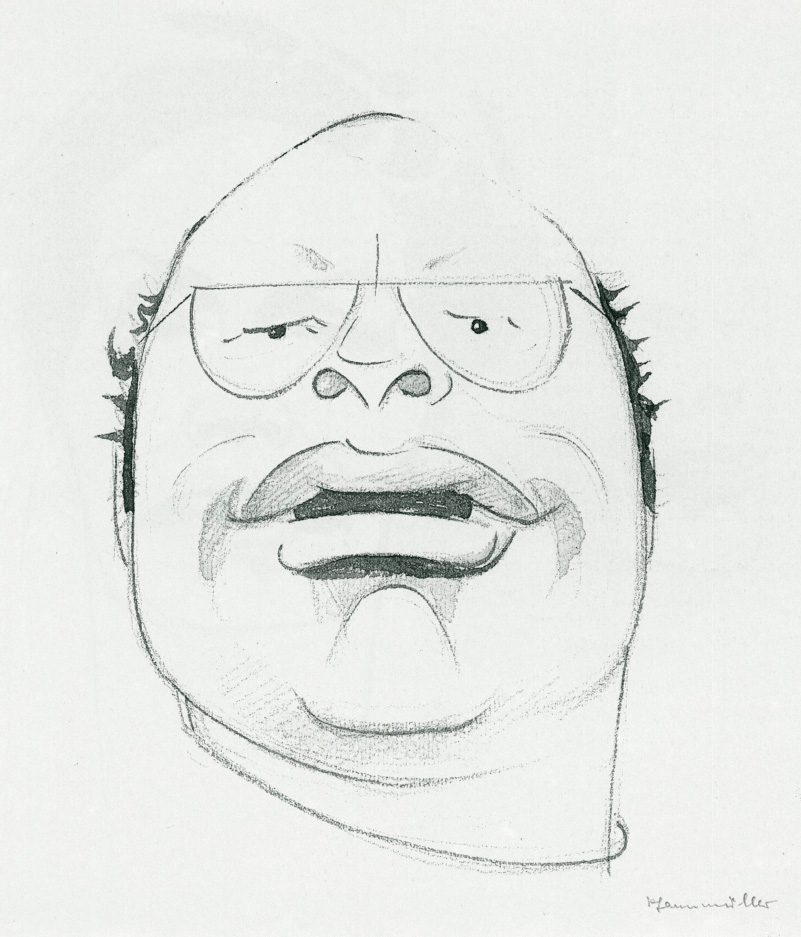
- Cartoon of Reichmann, 1975
- Born: 7 January 1932; Beuthen, Upper Silesia, Germany (now Bytom, Poland)
- Died: 7 May 1991 (aged 59); Zurich, Switzerland
- Occupation: Actor
- Years active: 1954-1991

Wolfgang Reichmann (7 January 1932 – 7 May 1991) was a German actor. He appeared in more than 60 films and television shows between 1954 and 1991. He starred in the film The Fair, which was entered into the 10th Berlin International Film Festival.

== Filmography ==
Year	Title	Role	Notes
1954	Rose-Girl Resli		
1958	Warum sind sie gegen uns?	Betrunkener	
1960	The Fair	Georg Höchert	
1960	My Schoolfriend	Dr. Dorn	
1960	Brandenburg Division	Ungerland	
1961	Zu jung für die Liebe?	Herr Rennert	
1961	Blind Justice	Alexander Lamas	
1961	It Can't Always Be Caviar	Hofbauer	
1961	Murder Party	Dr. Rosen	
1961	This Time It Must Be Caviar	Hofbauer	
1962	Seelenwanderung	Bum	TV film
1962	The Trial	Courtroom Guard	
1963	Danton's Death	Danton	TV film
1963	Der Sittlichkeitsverbrecher	Inspektor	
1966	The Nun	Le père Lemoine	
1968	Signs of Life	Meinhard	
1972	Tears of Blood	Luba	
1976	Derrick	Wilhelm Dettmers / Ernst Kettwig	2 episodes
1978	Good-for-Nothing	Portier	
1979	Woyzeck	Captain	
1980	A Guru Comes	Joachim Müller-Strehlitz	TV film
1985	Mary Ward	Pater Holtby	
1985	Beethoven's Nephew	Ludwig van Beethoven	
1987	The Second Victory	Max Holzinger	
1988-1989	War and Remembrance	Martin Bormann	2 episodes
1989	Besuch	Armin	
1990	Quiet Days in Clichy	Sebastien	Uncredited
