= Always Trouble with the Bed =

1961 film

- Directed by: Rudolf Schündler
- Written by: Janne Furch; Stefan Gommermann
- Produced by: Artur Brauner
- Starring: Senta Berger; Günter Pfitzmann; Trude Herr
- Cinematography: Siegfried Hold
- Edited by: Waltraut Wischniewsky
- Music by: Gerhard Becker
- Production company: Alfa Film
- Distributed by: Deutsche Filmvertriebs-Gemeinschaft
- Release date: 11 August 1961
- Running time: 88 minutes
- Country: West Germany
- Language: German

Always Trouble with the Bed (German: Immer Ärger mit dem Bett) is a 1961 West German comedy film directed by Rudolf Schündler and starring Senta Berger, Günter Pfitzmann and Trude Herr. It was shot at the Spandau Studios in West Berlin. The film's sets were designed by the art directors Paul Markwitz and Wilhelm Vorwerg.

== Synopsis ==
Rosemarie and her husband Peter have been married for six months. Although on the homicide squad, he is transferred by his superiors to investigate a ring producing pornographic photos.

== Cast ==
- Senta Berger as Rosemarie Schulze
- Günter Pfitzmann as Peter Schulze
- Trude Herr as Erna Meyer
- Rudolf Platte as Otto Schwarz
- Renate Ewert as Zsa Zsa
- Ida Boros as Madame Nimborg
- Edith Elmay as Baby
- Leon Askin as Luigi Papagallo
- Walter Gross as Windmacher, Abgeordneter
- Ralf Wolter as Meister
- Wolfgang Neuss as Gabriel Ernst, Bildhauer
- Kurt Pratsch-Kaufmann as Fleck
- Bruno W. Pantel as Berger
- Gerhard Hartig as Jonny
- Werner Stock as Erwin Krollmann
- Hans W. Hamacher as Lessing
- Klaus Dahlen as Gigolo

== Bibliography ==
- Bock, Hans-Michael & Bergfelder, Tim. The Concise CineGraph. Encyclopedia of German Cinema. Berghahn Books, 2009.
