= To Commit a Murder =

1967 film

- Directed by: Édouard Molinaro
- Written by: Édouard Molinaro
- Based on: novel by Jacques Robert
- Produced by: Alain Poiré
- Starring: Louis Jourdan; Senta Berger; Edmond O'Brien
- Cinematography: Raymond Lemoigne
- Edited by: Robert Isnardon
- Music by: José Berghmans
- Production companies: Eichberg-Film; Franca Film; Société Nouvelle des Établissements Gamount
- Distributed by: Gaumont Distribution
- Release date: 7 April 1967
- Running time: 91 minutes
- Country: France
- Language: French

To Commit a Murder (France: Peau d'espion) is a 1967 Franco-German neo-noir spy film starring Louis Jourdan. It was one of a series of thrillers directed by Edouard Molinaro in the 1960s. The film was based on the 1967 novel Peau d'espion by Jacques Robert.

== Plot ==
A playboy writer gets involved in a plot to kidnap a scientist and take him to Red China.

== Cast ==
- Louis Jourdan as Charles Beaulieu
- Senta Berger as Gertraud
- Bernard Blier as Maggiore Rhone
- Edmond O'Brien as Sphax
- Maurice Garrel as Black
- Fabrizio Capucci as Cecil
- Gamil Ratib as Belloum
- Giuseppe Addobbati as Moranez
