= Trude Herr =

German actress

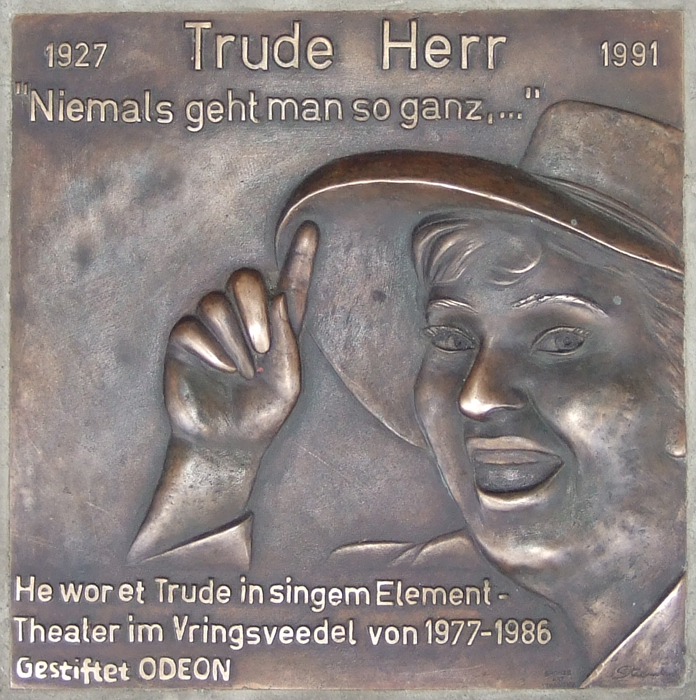
- memorial plaque to Trude Herr
- Born: 4 May 1927; Cologne, Germany
- Died: 16 March 1991 (aged 63); Lauris, Provence-Alpes-Côte d'Azur, France
- Occupations: Singer; actress
- Years active: 1955–1987

Trude Herr (German pronunciation: [ˈtʁuːdə hɛʁ]; 4 May 1927 – 16 March 1991) was a German film actress, singer and theatre owner. She was an entertainer in Germany from the early 1960s until her retirement.

== Early life ==
Trude Herr was born in the Cologne district of Kalk, grew up in the city's district of Mülheim and attended school there. Her father Robert Herr was a locomotive driver and was imprisoned for a long time because of his membership in the Communist Party; later he was sent to a concentration camp. For him she wrote the song "Papa", in which she thanked her father for her time; she sang it in 1961 at his funeral. She herself was a member of the Social Democratic Party of Germany. In 1933, she attended primary school in Cologne-Mülheim after which she worked in a bakery. Since the apartment of the Herrs was destroyed by bombs in 1943, they lived two years in the community of Ewersbach in Hesse.

There she worked as a typist in the Dillenburg city administration, where she was known by her nicknames of "Tutti" and jokingly also as "dat Pummel" because of her full figure. In 1946, she became an extra at the Aachener Wanderbühne, and from 1948 she received supporting roles at the Cologne Millowitsch Theater.

== Career ==
In the Millowitsch theater, she played her first major role in the recorded for television 1955 comedy The Sold Grandfather alongside Willy Millowitsch, Elsa Scholten, Franz Schneider and others. In 1949, she and her friend and mentor Gustav Schellhardt founded the "Cologne Lustspielbühne", whose existence, however, was not long lasting. Throughout her life, she was proud of this project and mentioned it repeatedly in press interviews. After its bankruptcy, Trude Herr worked between 1949 and 1954 as a barmaid in the gay bar Barberina (Hohes Tor).

From 1954 onwards, she performed at the carnival time again and again at the events of various clubs in Cologne as Büttenrednerin (carnival comedy speaker) and always earned great applause. In her performances, she followed the style of the well-known 1920s variety and revue singer Grete River. Trude Herr was discovered by Willi Schaeffers, the head of the cabaret Tingel-Tangel, who engaged her in Berlin in 1958. With the German version of Percolator under the title "Ich will keine Schokolade (ich will lieber einen Mann)" (English: I do not want chocolate (I'd prefer a man)) she reached No. 18 on the German hit charts. The song's German text was written by Carl-Ulrich Blecher. The song was performed by Herr in the German hit movie Marina (where she played "Trude Pippes"). The film premiered on 19 August 1960 and featured 15 hits, helping Herr to achieve her 1960 breakthrough.

Afterwards, she appeared in more than 30 films, made numerous appearances on television programs and was successful in the German schlager genre. In August 1964, she took a five-month journey through the Saharan States, where in 1969 she met the Tunesian Tuareg Ahmed M'Barek. He accompanied her back to Germany, where they were married; the marriage lasted until 1976. With her own ensemble, she performed successfully in the Millowitsch Theater; from 16 September 1970 she delighted audiences in The Pearl Anna, and from 21 September 1972 in The Pütz Family.

On 9 September 1977, she opened her folk theater Theater im Vringsveedel on Severinstraße. There she wanted to build a popular alternative to the established Millowitsch Theater. With plenty of Cologne humor and Kölsch sentimentality, garnished with a dose of vulgarity, she wrote and performed in pieces like Die Kölsche Geisha (1977), Der Hausmann and Massage Salon Denz (1979), Drei Glas Kölsch (1980), Scheidung Auf Kölsch (1981), Der Prophet (1985) and, as the last play, Der zweite Frühling (1986). Her stage partner at this time was Hans Künster. The schedule lasted only from September to the end of December, the rest of the time the theater was rented out or was dark. Without municipal subsidies, which she vainly applied for in 1977 and 1982, the theater was financially constantly on weak feet. The very high visitor use rate of 97 percent did not change this either – the fixed costs, including for 21 employees, were too high. Even though it was one of the best attended theaters in North Rhine-Westphalia, and also because of increasing health problems, she ended the theater experiment on 27 February 1986.

In between theatrical productions, she worked in the WDR Fernsehen television production of Schöne Bescherung, which was broadcast in December 1983. Between October 1986 and January 1987, she recorded in the Info Studios in Monheim am Rhein with producer Thomas Brück her album Ich sage was ich meine ("I say what I mean") with international hits featuring German lyrics. The melancholic song Niemals geht man so ganz ("You never leave completely"), which she interpreted with Wolfgang Niedecken (BAP) and Tommy Engel (Bläck Fööss) was her last great success; it reached in No. 20 in the German charts in August 1986.

== Last years ==
After six serious operations on her neck and legs, she moved to Fiji in 1987 for health reasons and settled near the capital of Suva. In 1988, she received the Cross of Merit of the Federal Republic of Germany. That same year, she appeared in her final TV interview with Günther Jauch.

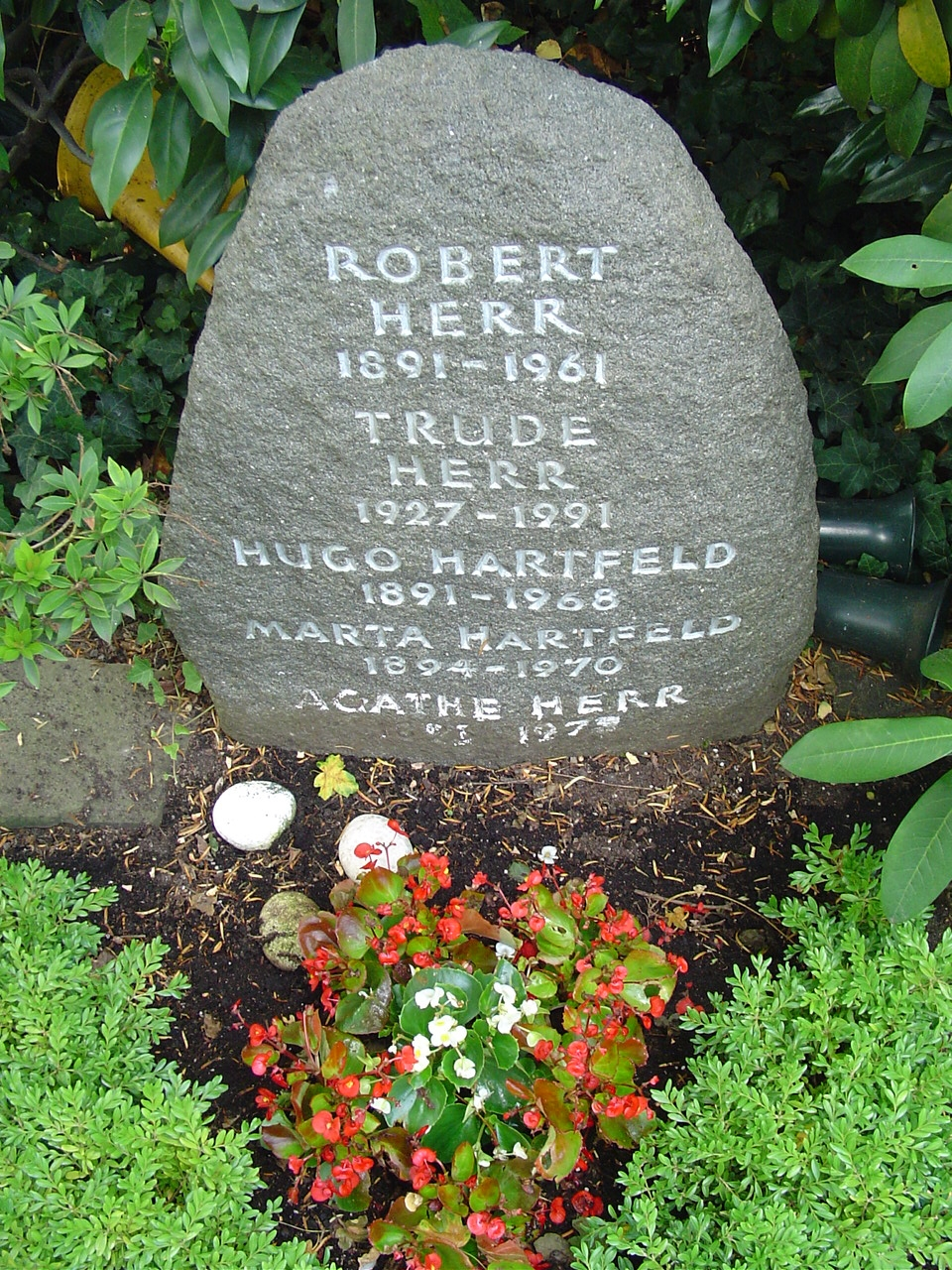
Herr's grave at the Kölner Nordfriedhof cemetery.

In January 1991, she returned with Samuel Bawesi, her partner, from Fiji to Cologne. In February 1991, she moved to Lauris, a small village in Vaucluse, Provence-Alpes-Côte d'Azur in southern France, where she died of heart failure on 16 March 1991. She was buried in the North Cemetery, Cologne.

== Selected filmography ==
- Triplets on Board (1959)
- Of Course, the Motorists (1959)
- Every Day Isn't Sunday (1959)
- The Last Pedestrian (1960)
- Conny and Peter Make Music (1960)
- Our Crazy Aunts (1961)
- Always Trouble with the Bed (1961)
- Adieu, Lebewohl, Goodbye (1961)
- Robert and Bertram (1961)
- Café Oriental (1962)
- Don't Fool with Me (1963)
- With Best Regards (1963)
- Our Crazy Aunts in the South Seas (1964)
- Freddy in the Wild West (1964)
- The Seventh Victim (1964)
- The Mad Aunts Strike Out (1971)

== Bibliography ==
- Thomas Weisser. Spaghetti Westerns—the Good, the Bad and the Violent: A Comprehensive, Illustrated Filmography of 558 Eurowesterns and Their Personnel, 1961–1977. McFarland, 2005.
