= Wilhelm Vorwerg =

German art director

- Born: 6 August 1899; Saarau, Lower Silesia, German Empire
- Died: 15 July 1990 (aged 90); Cologne, North Rhine-Westphalia, West Germany
- Occupation: Art director
- Years active: 1937-1973

Wilhelm Vorwerg (1899–1990) was a German art director who designed the sets for over fifty films including a number of Rialto Film's series of Edgar Wallace adaptations in the 1960s.

== Selected filmography ==
- In the Name of the People (1939)
- Target in the Clouds (1939)
- The Leghorn Hat (1939)
- Venus on Trial (1941)
- Love Letters (1944)
- Summer Nights (1944)
- 1-2-3 Corona (1948)
- The Cuckoos (1949)
- How Do We Tell Our Children? (1949)
- Life Begins at Seventeen (1953)
- Anna Susanna (1953)
- Annie from Tharau (1954)
- The Perfect Couple (1954)
- Heroism after Hours (1955)
- Urlaub auf Ehrenwort (1955)
- Island of the Dead (1955)
- My Father, the Actor (1956)
- Stresemann (1957)
- The Fox of Paris (1957)
- Two Hearts in May (1958)
- The Girl with the Cat's Eyes (1958)
- The Shadows Grow Longer (1961)
- World in My Pocket (1961)
- Always Trouble with the Bed (1961)
- Adieu, Lebewohl, Goodbye (1961)
- Café Oriental (1962)
- The Secret of the Black Trunk (1962)
- The Indian Scarf (1963)
- The Curse of the Hidden Vault (1964)
- The Secret of Dr. Mabuse (1964)
- Room 13 (1964)
- The College Girl Murders (1967)
- The Gorilla of Soho (1968)
- The Hound of Blackwood Castle (1968)
- The Man with the Glass Eye (1969)

== Bibliography ==
- Bergfelder, Tim. International Adventures: German Popular Cinema and European Co-Productions in the 1960s. Berghahn Books, 2005.
