= Nordfriedhof (Dresden) =

Cemetery in Dresden, Germany

Coordinates: 51.080°N 13.777°E

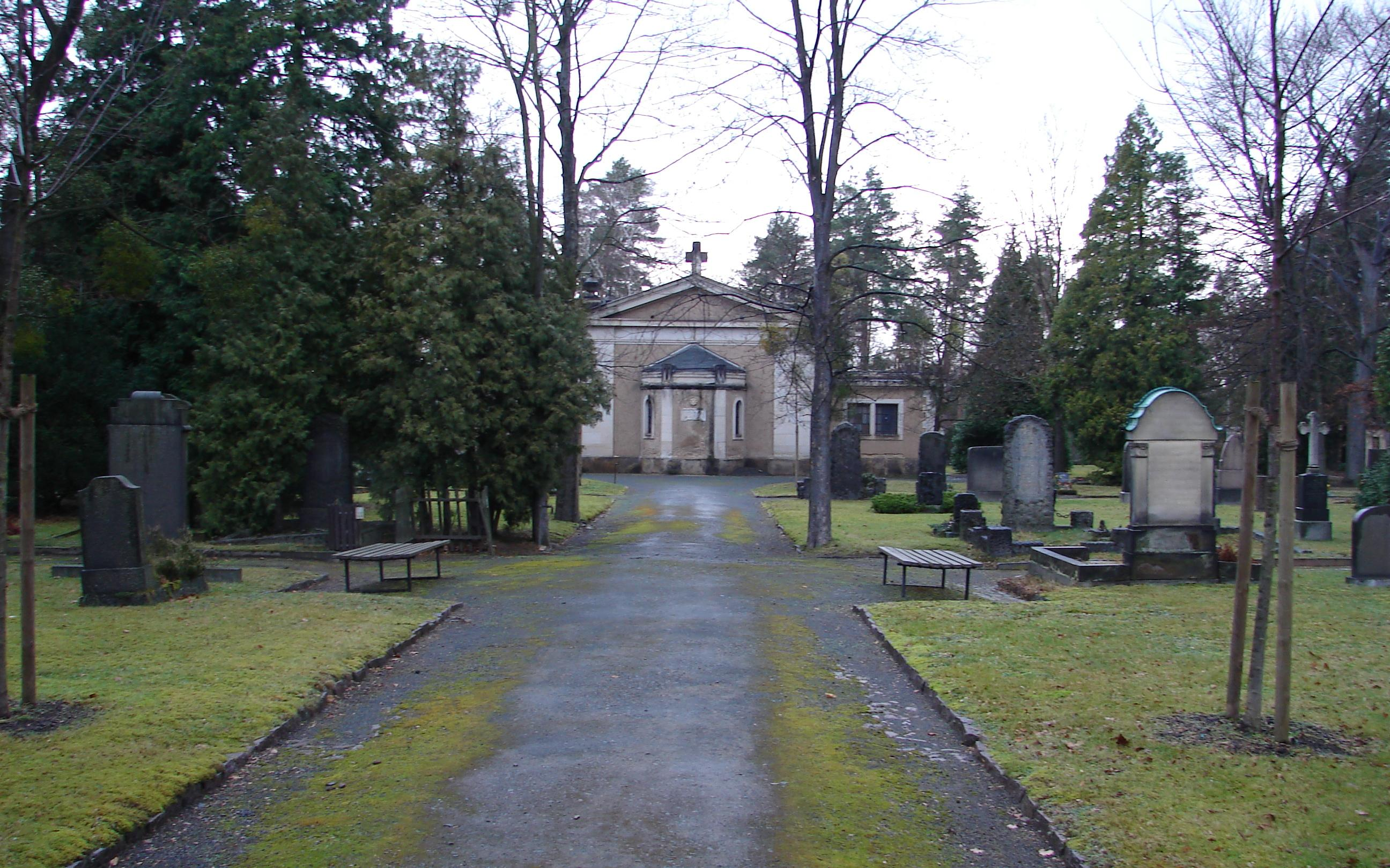
Oldest part of the Nordfriedhof with the chapel

The Nordfriedhof ("Northern Cemetery") in Dresden is the former military cemetery of the capital of Saxony, now used as a public cemetery.

The Nordfriedhof is in the district of Albertstadt and is situated to the north-east of the inner city, near the south-western edge of the Dresdner Heide. Near the cemetery grounds of about 4 hectares, accessible via the Marienallee as well as the Kannenhenkelweg, are the Army Officer School and the Cemetery of the Soviet Garrison of Dresden (Sowjetischer Garnisonfriedhof Dresden).

It was established in 1900 as the "Garrison Cemetery" (Garnisonfriedhof) to deal with the fatalities from the nearby military hospital and was subsequently enlarged. After the end of World War II it was turned into a civilian cemetery and renamed.

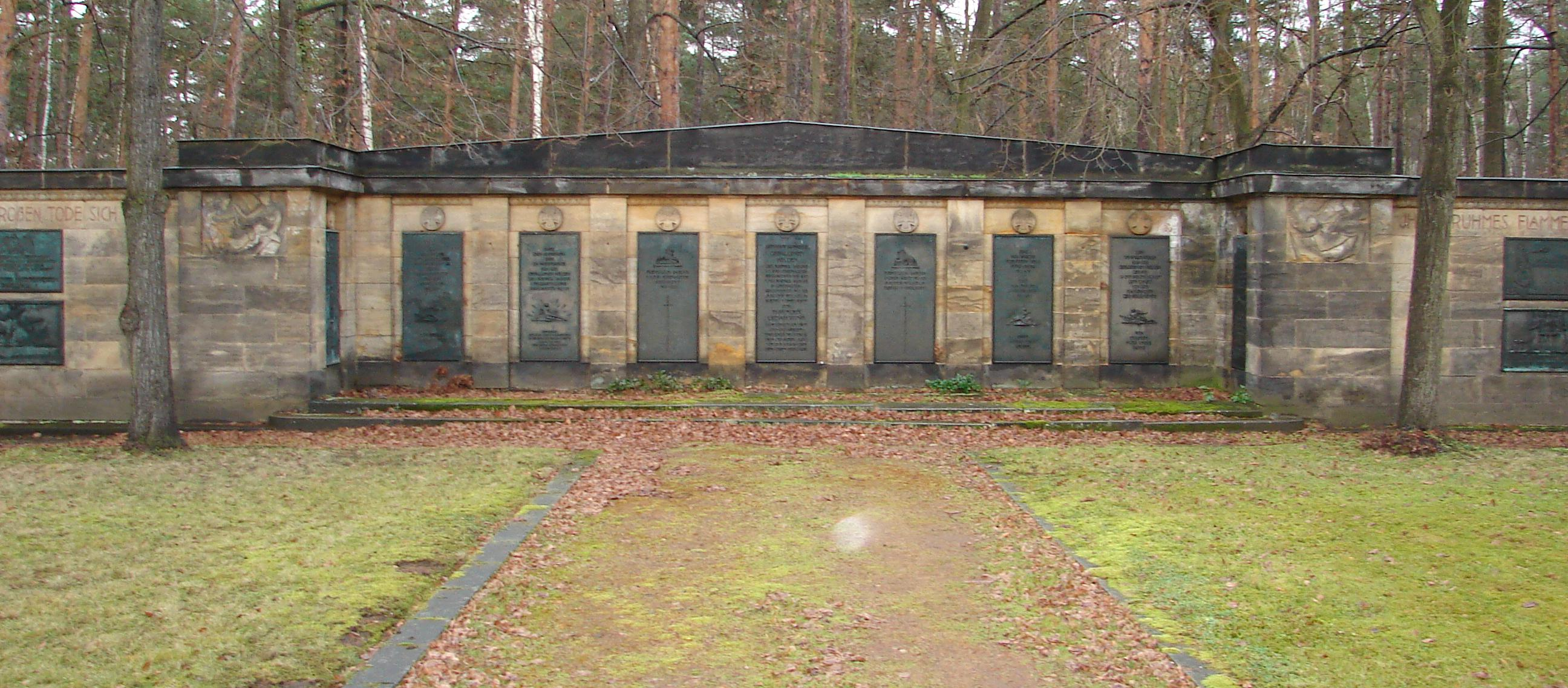
Memorial for the fallen of World War I of the Dresden Garrison

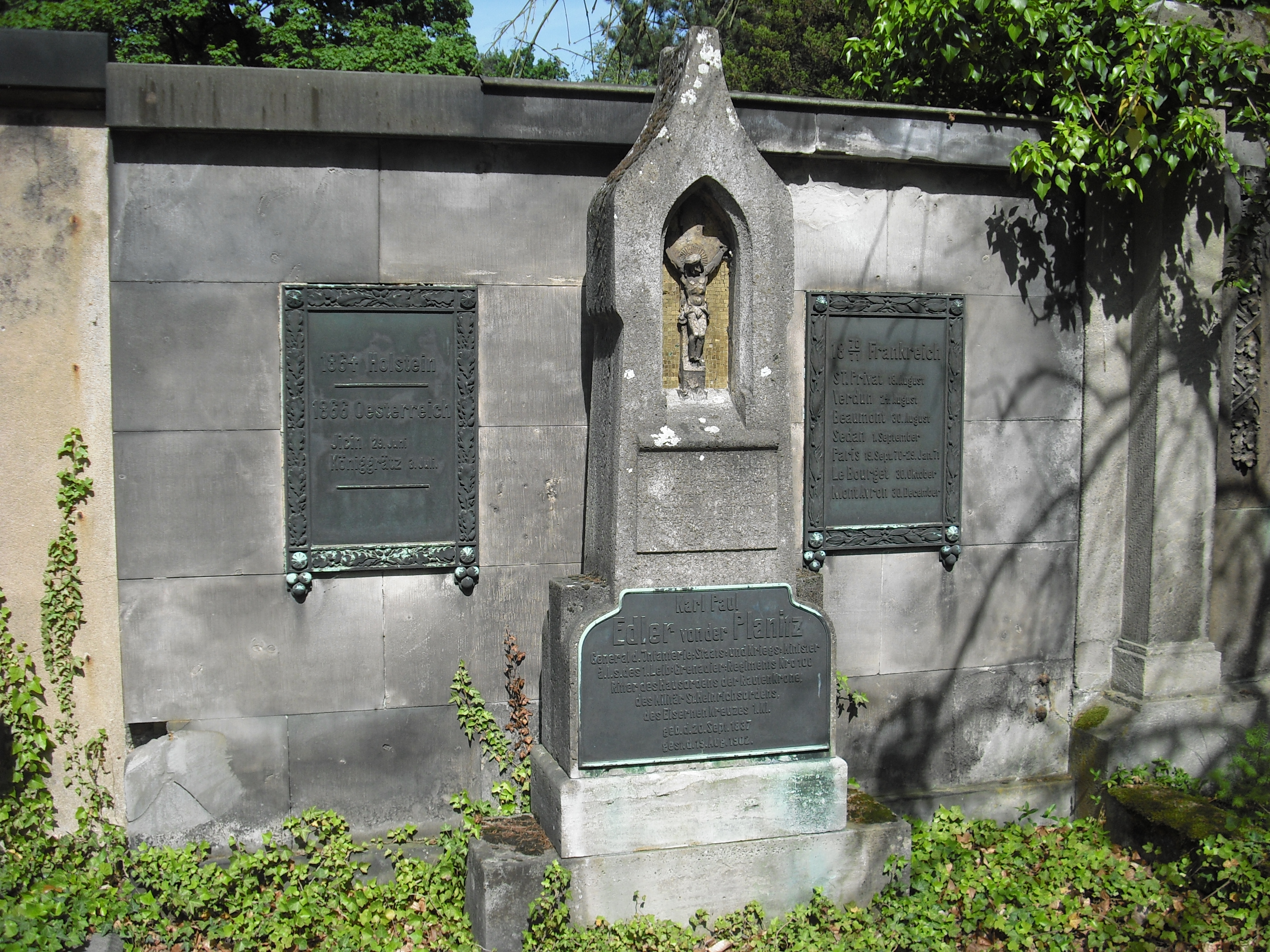
Tomb of Paul von der Planitz

== History ==
As a consequence of the Franco-Prussian War the Saxon Army was modernised. As part of the reorganisation large barracks were built in the 1870s in the Albertstadt to plans by the Kingdom of Saxony Minister of War Fabrice. These included a large military hospital north of the cadet accommodation of the officers' school, now on the grounds of the Albertstadt Barracks. In about 1900 Paul von der Planitz, Fabrice's successor at the Ministry of War, proposed the establishment of a military cemetery so that those soldiers who died in the hospital, as well as their dependants and servants, could be buried close by.

On 1 October 1901 the Nordfriedhof was formally dedicated, under the name Garnisonfriedhof ("Garrison Cemetery"). The first burial took place in December of that year. The chapel was dedicated in 1902. Initially the walled cemetery comprised a rectangular area of about one hectare.

An extension became necessary in World War I, for the fallen of which a separate area was opened in 1917, to the east of the old walled area. Plaques of honour, created by Emil Hartmann, were donated and erected here by the regimental associations. Besides more than 2,000 members of the German Army, Serbian, Russian, French and Czech prisoners of war were buried here. From 1922 to 1947 a bronze monument by Max Lange, of considerable artistic reputation, stood here, representing two soldiers in a fight to the death. It was melted down by order of the Soviet Military Administration in Germany. A memorial service to the honour of the fallen was held here every year on or about the feast of Saint John the Baptist (24 June). In 1930 the cemetery was renamed as the Standortfriedhof.

During World War II it was necessary to enlarge the cemetery a second time, which was easily achieved as it is entirely surrounded by woodland. This third area was set up in about 1940 and surrounded by a wall, including the area of the first extension. More than 700 German soldiers of the Wehrmacht are buried here, as well as foreign forced labourers in 11 mass graves and more than 100 conscientious objectors, who were either executed or committed suicide. After the air raids of February 1945 on Dresden more than 450 of those killed were buried here, principally fire brigade members and soldiers; they are commemorated by a memorial stone. The great majority of the victims of 13–14 February are buried in the Heidefriedhof, however.

Shortly after the end of the war the name of the cemetery was again changed, this time to the Nordfriedhof. At this time, directly over the street, by the order of the Soviet forces of occupation, the Sowjetischer Garnisonfriedhof Dresden ("Cemetery of the Soviet Garrison of Dresden") was opened, for the dead of the Soviet Army.

Also in the Nordfriedhof is a columbarium containing approximately 5,500 urn burials from the 1950s and 1960s. The cemetery has been a protected monument since 1987. Today it is a municipal cemetery for civilian burials. Every year on the anniversary of the assassination attempt of 20 July 1944 on Adolf Hitler, a memorial service to the victims of National Socialism takes place.

== Graves of notable people ==
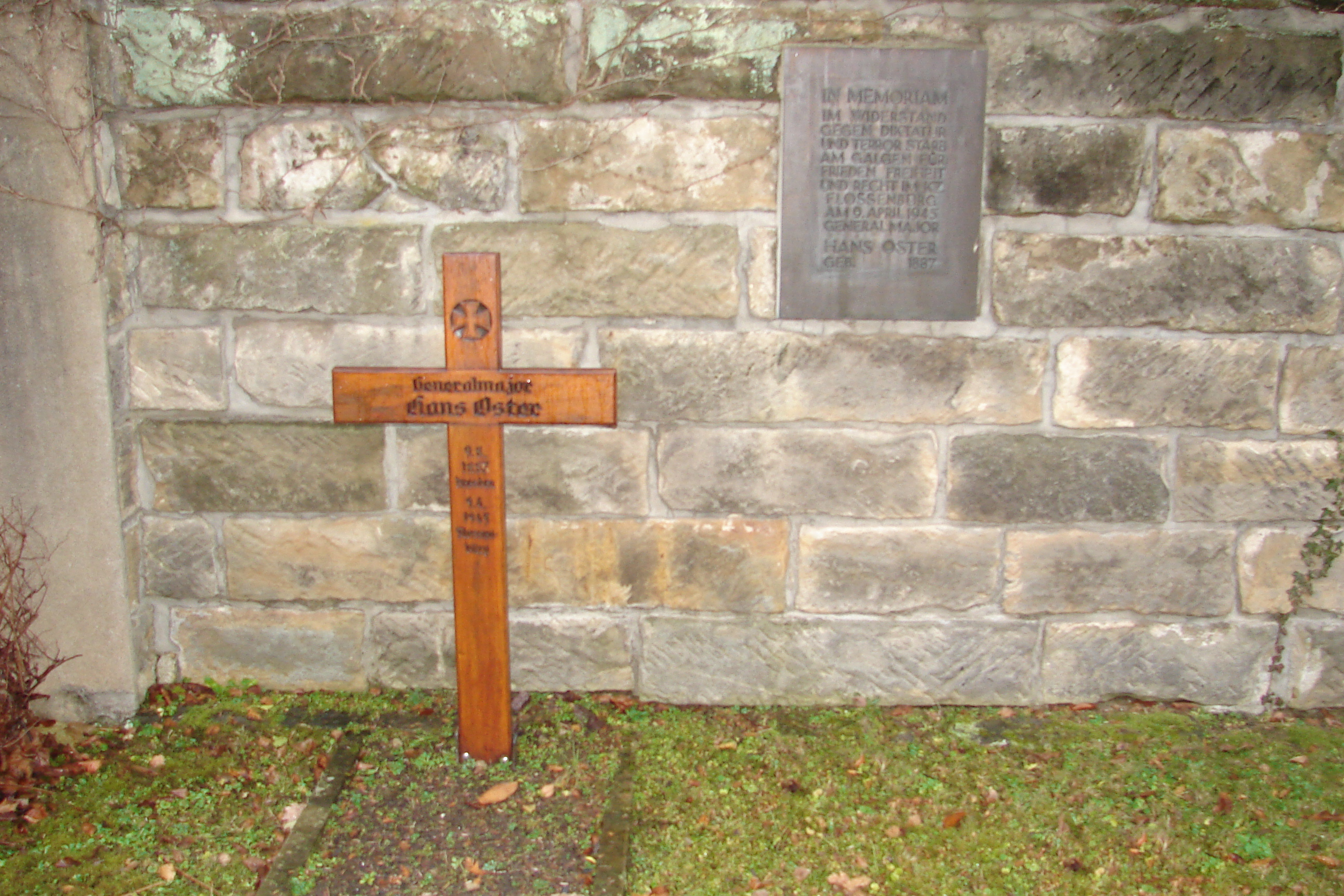
Memorial to the resistance fighter Hans Oster on the inner wall of the cemetery

- Felix von Barth (1851–1931), General
- Adolph von Carlowitz (1858–1928), General and Minister of War of Saxony
- Heinrich Leo von Carlowitz (1846–1907), Lieutenant-General
- Gustav von der Decken (1861–1931), Lieutenant-General
- August Fortmüller (1864–1942), Lieutenant-General
- Charles Garke (1860–1936), Lieutenant-General (lived in the Villa Garke)
- Lothar von Hausen (1907–1944), corvette captain
- Paul von Hingst (1846–1919), Lieutenant-General,
- Julius Carl Mathias Hoch (1863–1930), Lieutenant-General
- Constantin von Hoenning O'Carroll (1841–1925), Lieutenant-General
- Eduard Hummitzsch (1846–1917), Major-General (tomb is considered artistically valuable)
- Ernst Hüttig (1872–1913), Paymaster of the protective troops of German East Africa
- Wilhelm Jahn (1866–1924), Lieutenant-General
- Hans von Kirchbach (1849–1928), Colonel of the General Staff
- Hans Karl Albert Alexander von Kirchbach (1869–1918), Major
- Maximilian von Laffert (1855–1917), General
- Johannes Anton Larraß (1832–1908), Lieutenant-General
- Max Leuthold (1863–1934), Lieutenant-General
- Curt von Loeben (1841–1920), Lieutenant-General
- Curt von Loeben (1885–1956), Major
- Georg Ludwig Rudolf Maercker (1869–1924), General and Landeskommandant of Saxony
- Alfred Müller (1866–1925), General and Landeskommandant of Saxony
- Paul von der Planitz (1837–1902), General and Minister of War of Saxony
- Adolf von Rabenhorst (1846–1925), General
- Hermann von Schweinitz (1851–1931), General
- Karl Rudolf Sohn (1845–1908) portrait painter.
- Else Sohn-Rethel (1853–1933) painter and singer.
- Arno Thalmann (1869–1932), Generaloberarzt
- Gotthard von Timroth (1868–1941), Imperial Russian Major-General and Knight of St. George
- Arno Friedrich August Trinckauf (1874–1934), Generalarzt
- Alphons de Vaux (1854–1918), Lieutenant-General
- Woldemar Graf Vitzthum von Eckstädt (1863–1936), President of the Saxon Land Synod
- Hans von Watzdorf (1857–1931), Lieutenant-General
- Bernhard Woldemar Weigel (1851–1908), Major-General (tomb is considered artistically valuable)

There are also memorials for members of the plot of 20 July 1944:

- Friedrich Olbricht (1888–1944), General and resistance fighter
- Hans Oster (1887–1945), Major-General and resistance fighter

== Memorials ==
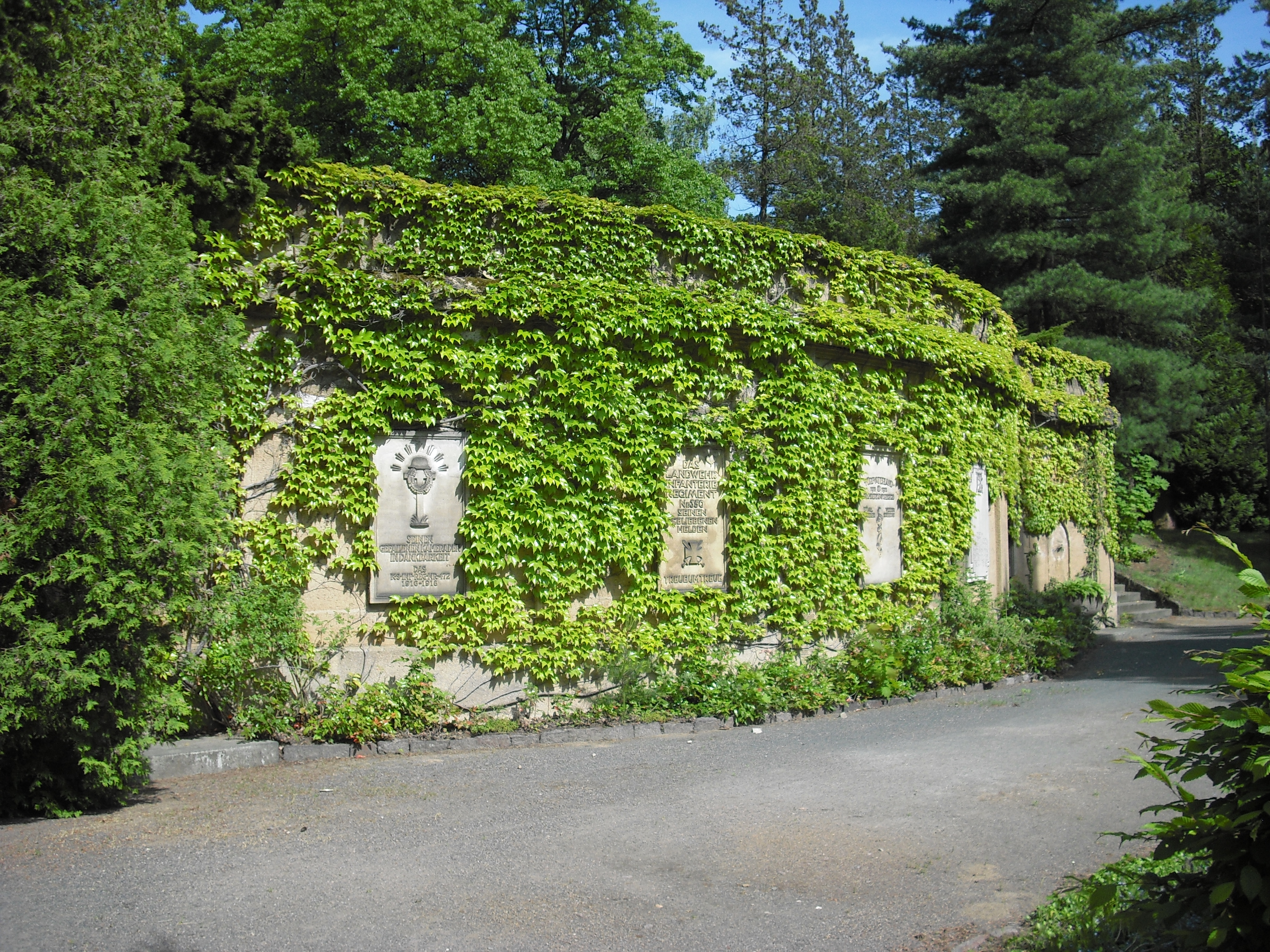
Approach to the memorial grove

- Memorial grove for the fallen soldiers of World War I of the Dresden Garrison (considered artistically valuable)
- Memorial to the victims of the air raids of 13 February 1945
- Memorial to the fallen of World War II
- Memorial to the members fallen in World War II of Infantry Regiment No. 10, Artillery Regiment No. 4 and Cavalry Regiment No. 12
- Memorial cross for soldiers of the Wehrmacht condemned to death for desertion or Wehrkraftzersetzung (sedition)
- Memorial for Hungarian citizens
- Memorial for Polish, Czech and Rumanian workers
- Memorial for forced workers from the Soviet Union

== Sources ==
- Stein, Marion, 2000: Friedhöfe in Dresden (edited by the Kulturamt der Stadt Dresden). Verlag der Kunst Dresden ISBN 90-5705-130-3
- Arbeitskreis Sächsische Militärgeschichte e. V.
