= Nordfriedhof (Cologne) =

Cemetery in Cologne, Germany

Coordinates: 50°58′44″N 6°56′24″E

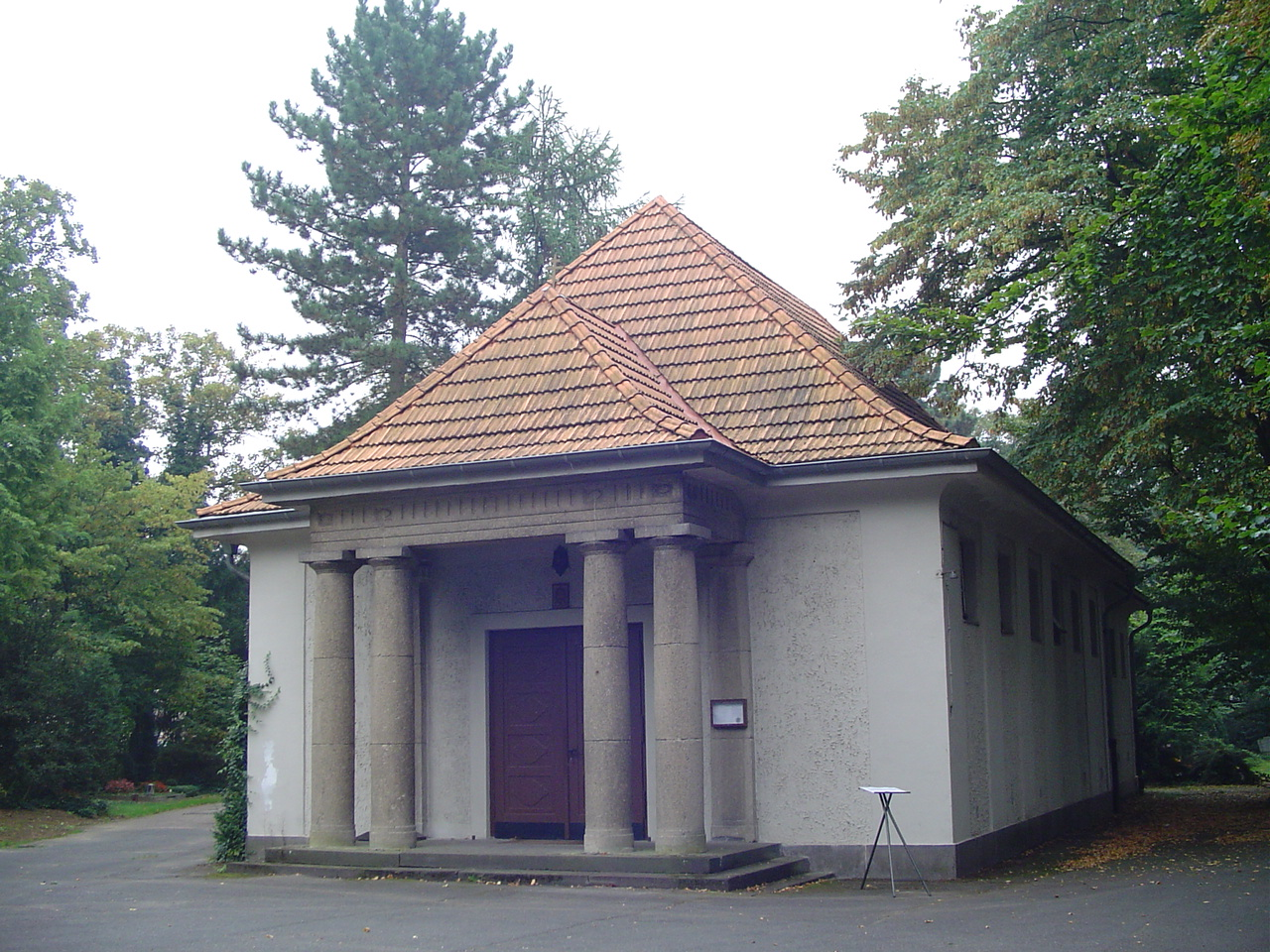

Nordfriedhof is a cemetery in Cologne, Germany. Opened on 18 May 1896 and after the Second World War the cemetery was significantly expanded. German actress Trude Herr (1927–1991) is buried there.
