= Paul Markwitz =

Production designer

- Born: 16 July 1908; Berlin, German Empire
- Died: 19 March 1968 (aged 59); Berlin, West Germany
- Occupations: Production designer Art director Set decorator
- Years active: 1935-1967

Paul Markwitz (16 July 1908 – 19 March 1968) was a German production designer, art director and set decorator. He worked on over 50 films between 1935 and 1967. He was nominated for an Academy Award in the category Best Art Direction for the film Martin Luther.

== Selected filmography ==
- Fruit in the Neighbour's Garden (1935)
- Thunder, Lightning and Sunshine (1936)
- Meine Frau, die Perle (1936)
- Sergeant Berry (1938)
- The Holm Murder Case (1938)
- A Man Astray (1940)
- Encounter with Werther (1949)
- Wedding Night In Paradise (1950)
- When a Woman Loves (1950)
- Martin Luther (1953)
- Spring Song (1954)
- Three from Variety (1954)
- Confession Under Four Eyes (1954)
- The Gypsy Baron (1954)
- The Inn on the Lahn (1955)
- I Know What I'm Living For (1955)
- Black Forest Melody (1956)
- Spy for Germany (1956)
- Precocious Youth (1957)
- The Simple Girl (1957)
- Widower with Five Daughters (1957)
- The Count of Luxemburg (1957)
- Munchhausen in Africa (1958)
- The Star of Santa Clara (1958)
- The Day the Rains Came (1959)
- Peter Shoots Down the Bird (1959)
- Adieu, Lebewohl, Goodbye (1961)
- Always Trouble with the Bed (1961)
- The Secret of the Black Trunk (1962)
- The Terror of Doctor Mabuse (1962)
- Café Oriental (1962)
- Doctor Sibelius (1962)

== See also ==
- List of German-speaking Academy Award winners and nominees
