= Die Feuerzangenbowle (1970 film) =

1970 film directed by Helmut Käutner

- Film poster, 1970
- Directed by: Helmut Käutner
- Written by: Heinrich Spoerl (novel); Helmut Käutner (screenplay); Igor Oberberg (screenplay)
- Edited by: Jane Seitz
- Release date: 18 September 1970
- Country: West Germany
- Language: German

Die Feuerzangenbowle is a 1970 West German film based on the book of the same name and a remake of the 1934 and 1944 films. This version of was part of a number of 1970s films concentrating on the theme of modernizing the school system. It was much less successful than its predecessors.

== Cast ==
- Walter Giller as Dr. Hans Pfeiffer
- Uschi Glas as Eva Knauer
- Theo Lingen as Professor Crey
- Fritz Tillmann as Direktor Knauer
- Willy Reichert as Professor Bömmel
- Hans Richter as Dr. Brett
- Rudolf Schündler as Musiklehrer
- Helen Vita as Frau Windscheid
- Nadja Tiller as Marion Xylander
- Wolfgang Condrus as Husemann
- Alice Treff as Frau Knauer
- Herbert Weißbach as Oberschulrat Hinzelmann
- Willi Rose as Klemke
- Karl-Josef Cramer as Rosen
- Hans-Werner Bussinger as Knebel
