= Die Feuerzangenbowle =

1933 novel by Heinrich Spoerl

Die Feuerzangenbowle: Eine Lausbüberei in der Kleinstadt
- 2002 edition cover
- Author: Heinrich Spoerl
- Language: German
- Publisher: Droste Verlag
- Publication date: 1933
- Publication place: Germany
- Media type: Print (Hardback)
- Pages: 264

Die Feuerzangenbowle (The Fire Tongs Bowl, The Punch Bowl) is a German novel, later adapted into several films, which tells the story of a famous writer going undercover as a pupil at a small town gymnasium after his friends tell him that he missed out on the best part of growing up by being educated at home. The story in the book takes place during the Weimar Republic in Germany. The novel by Heinrich Spoerl was published in 1933 and was adapted to film three times. The 1944 movie of the same name directed by Helmut Weiss is the most notable adaptation of the material.

== Authorship ==
Die Feuerzangenbowle: Eine Lausbüberei in der Kleinstadt was written by Heinrich Spoerl. The novel adopts ideas from Ernst Eckstein's Der Besuch im Karzer (published 1875) and was partly inspired by personal accounts of Spoerl's own schooldays as well as his son's pranks at school. The first edition was published in 1933 by Droste Verlag.

On March 12, 2010, the Landgericht Hamburg (county court) ruled that Hans Reimann is not co-author of the novel. The fact that Spoerl shared his royalties with Reimann is in no way to be considered as proof of co-authorship. The court decided that the publishing contract on the novel, signed by Spoerl alone, clearly indicates his exclusive authorship.

== Plot summary ==
The novel starts with an epigraph : "This novel sings a praise about School, even though School may take no notice about that."

The title refers to the Feuerzangenbowle punch consumed by a group of gentlemen in the opening scene. While they exchange nostalgic stories about their schooldays, the successful young writer Dr. Johannes Pfeiffer realizes he missed out on something because he was taught at home and never attended school. He decides to make up for it by masquerading as a student at a small-town high school. At the school he quickly gains a reputation as a prankster. Together with his classmates, he torments his professors Crey, Bömmel and Headmaster Knauer with adolescent mischief. His girlfriend Marion unsuccessfully tries to persuade him to give up his foolish charade. Eventually, he falls in love with the headmaster's daughter and discloses his identity after provoking the teachers into expelling him from school.

== Characters ==
=== Hans Pfeiffer ===
Dr. Johannes Pfeiffer is an accomplished playwright in Berlin who never attended regular school as he was educated at home. His friends' nostalgic recollections of their schooldays convince him that he missed out on something and he decides to go undercover as a gymnasium student in the fictional small town Babenberg. He introduces himself as Hans Pfeiffer "with three F – one before and two after the ei" and quickly gets into the habit of playing elaborate pranks on his teachers.

=== The teachers ===
The teachers in the story are stereotypic parodies of different teaching styles. Professors Bömmel and Crey represent liberal and conservative teaching styles respectively, but neither has much luck in gaining the students' respect. The teachers' exaggerated individual quirks and particularly their dialects set them up to be easy targets for imitation and ridicule by the students. Some have acquired nicknames based on their looks. Headmaster Knauer, for example, is known as "Zeus" among the students, whereas Professor Crey is referred to as "Schnauz" (mustache). The teacher Brett in the 1944 movie, who represents the authoritarian style popularized at the time, does not appear in the book.

=== The women ===
Two women play central roles in the story and Pfeiffer's life. Pfeiffer's lover Marion is a modern and self-assured "big city girl". She travels to Babenberg to try to convince Pfeiffer of the foolishness of his actions and bring him back to Berlin. Pfeiffer declines and she threatens to blow his cover. This makes her the bad girl of the story in accordance with the ideologies of the times reproving emancipated and sinful women like Marion. She eventually loses Pfeiffer when he falls in love with innocent blonde Eva, Headmaster Knauer's daughter, who embodies the ideal image of a proper "girl next door".

== Adaptations ==
The novel has been adapted into three films:

- 1934: So ein Flegel
- 1944: Die Feuerzangenbowle
- 1970: Die Feuerzangenbowle

Theater:

- Düsseldorf-Bilk, 2004
- Coburger Landestheater, 2006

Musical:

- Neu-Isenburg, 2004
