= The Struggle (1936 film) =

1936 film

- Russian: Борцы
- Directed by: Gustav von Wangenheim
- Written by: Joris Ivens; Alfred Kurella; Gustav von Wangenheim
- Produced by: Jakob Freund
- Starring: Lotte Loebinger; Bruno Schmidtsdorf; Gregor Gog; Ingeborg Franke; Heinrich Greif
- Cinematography: Bentsion Monastyrsky
- Music by: Hans Hauska
- Release date: 1936
- Countries: Soviet Union; Germany
- Languages: Russian, German

The Struggle (Russian: Борцы; Bortsy, German: Kämpfer) is a 1936 Soviet-German film directed by Gustav von Wangenheim.

The film is set in Germany, where Hans Lemke is murdered after learning about secret military production at the perfume factory in his city. His brother Fritz wants to expose the murderers of Hans.

== Plot ==
The film depicts the resistance of workers against fascism, inspired by the arrest of communist leader Georgi Dimitrov. Two storylines unfold in parallel: the Reichstag fire trial, where Dimitrov is accused of orchestrating the Reichstag fire of 1933, and the workers' resistance against the fascists of the SA and SS. The workers are falsely accused by the SA of setting fire to the Spörke factory. Leading the resistance movement are Mother Lemke and Anna, who regard Dimitrov as their symbol in the fight against fascism. Mother Lemke's defiance is fueled by the murder of her son Hans by the SA. Hans had discovered that the Spörke factory was producing poison gas as a weapon of war, rather than perfume as claimed.

Gradually, Dimitrov gains supporters worldwide, sparking demonstrations demanding his release. Mother Lemke and Anna's resistance movement also grows, drawing in her son Fritz, a doctor, and even former members of the SA.

The film concludes with Dimitrov's liberation, symbolizing hope for the imminent downfall of fascism.

== Cast ==
- Lotte Loebinger as Fritz Lemkes mother
- Bruno Schmidtsdorf as Fritz Lemke
- Georg Gog as Peters
- Ingeborg Franke as Anna
- Heinrich Greif as Eickhoff
- Aleksandr Timontayev as Rabenkampf
- Robert Trösch as Otto
- Alexander Granach as Rovelli
- Aleksandr Geirot as Klebersbusch
- Evgenia Mezentseva as Woman
