= Erich Knauf =

German journalist, author und songwriter (1895–1944)

Erich Knauf

Erich Knauf (21 February 1895 – 2 May 1944) was a German journalist, writer, and songwriter. He was executed for making jokes about the Nazi regime.

== Biography ==
Knauf was born in Meerane, Saxony, the son of a tailor and party secretary of the Social Democratic Party. The family later moved to Gera, where he learned the typesetting trade. After the First World War, Knauf went to university, studying history, political economy and culture.

He was a close friend of Erich Kästner and Erich Ohser (pen name, e. o. plauen) and together, they became known as "the three Erichs from Saxony". An erotic poem by Kästner, with a frivolous illustration by Ohser, became a scandal, forcing all three to leave Saxony, whereupon Knauf moved to Berlin.

Knauf was a member of the Independent Social Democratic Party, an editor of the newspaper, "Plauener Volkszeitung".

In Berlin, Knauf began directing the Büchergilde Gutenberg (Gutenberg Book Guild) in 1928. In 1930, Knauf published a semi-autobiographical novel, Ça ira ("It will" in French) about his experiences during the Kapp Putsch of the Weimar republic. After the Nazi Party seized power in 1933, the guild became "nazified" and Knauf quit in disgust, taking his secretary, Erna Donath with him. Knauf and Donath then got married.

In 1934, he wrote a critical review of Carmen at the German state opera, angering Ministerpräsident Hermann Göring, who was a patron of the opera house. Göring had Knauf arrested by the Gestapo. He spent three months in protective custody in Sachsenhausen concentration camp and was expelled from all professional associations, as had Kästner and Ohser previously experienced.

After his release, he became the chief publicist for the film company, Tobis Rota. In order to get by, he had to adapt to working with people such as Veit Harlan, who produced the anti-semitic film, Jud Süß, but he also got to know Werner Bochmann, a successful film music composer who also came from Meerane. Knauf and Bochmann teamed up to write the song, "Heimat, Deine Sterne" ("Homeland, your stars"), for the film Quax, der Bruchpilot ("Quax, the crash pilot") starring Heinz Rühmann. Other work followed.

== Arrest and execution for making criminal jokes ==
In 1943, Knauf lost his home in a bombing raid. He and Ohser moved to Kaulsdorf, where they still had to endure many hours in bomb shelters, waiting out bombing raids. Ohser, who was hard of hearing and spoke loudly, and Knauf complained about the war and passed the time making wisecracks about Adolf Hitler and Göring. A neighbor, who was a Nazi Hauptmann, Bruno Schultz and his wife Margarete, listened to every word. Schultz made no comment, but afterward, wrote everything down. The Schultzes then denounced Knauf and Ohser to the Gestapo with this as evidence.

Knauf was arrested on 28 March 1944. On 6 April 1944 he was sentenced to death by judge Roland Freisler at the Volksgerichtshof for "undermining military morale" and "denigrating the Führer" (Wehrkraftzersetzung and Verunglimpfung des Führers). Joseph Goebbels himself selected Freisler to preside over the trial and pressed for swift and harsh retribution. Knauf was beheaded on 2 May 1944, with the Fallbeil at Brandenburg-Görden Prison in Brandenburg an der Havel. His widow, Erna Knauf, was given a bill of 585.74 ℛ︁ℳ︁ for the cost of the proceedings against her husband, including his execution. Ohser, who was arrested with Knauf, committed suicide the night before their trial, and in an apparent attempt to mitigate the charges against Knauf, left behind a suicide note in which he assumed all responsibility for their actions.

After the war, Bruno Schultz died of typhus in Soviet custody.

== Legacy ==
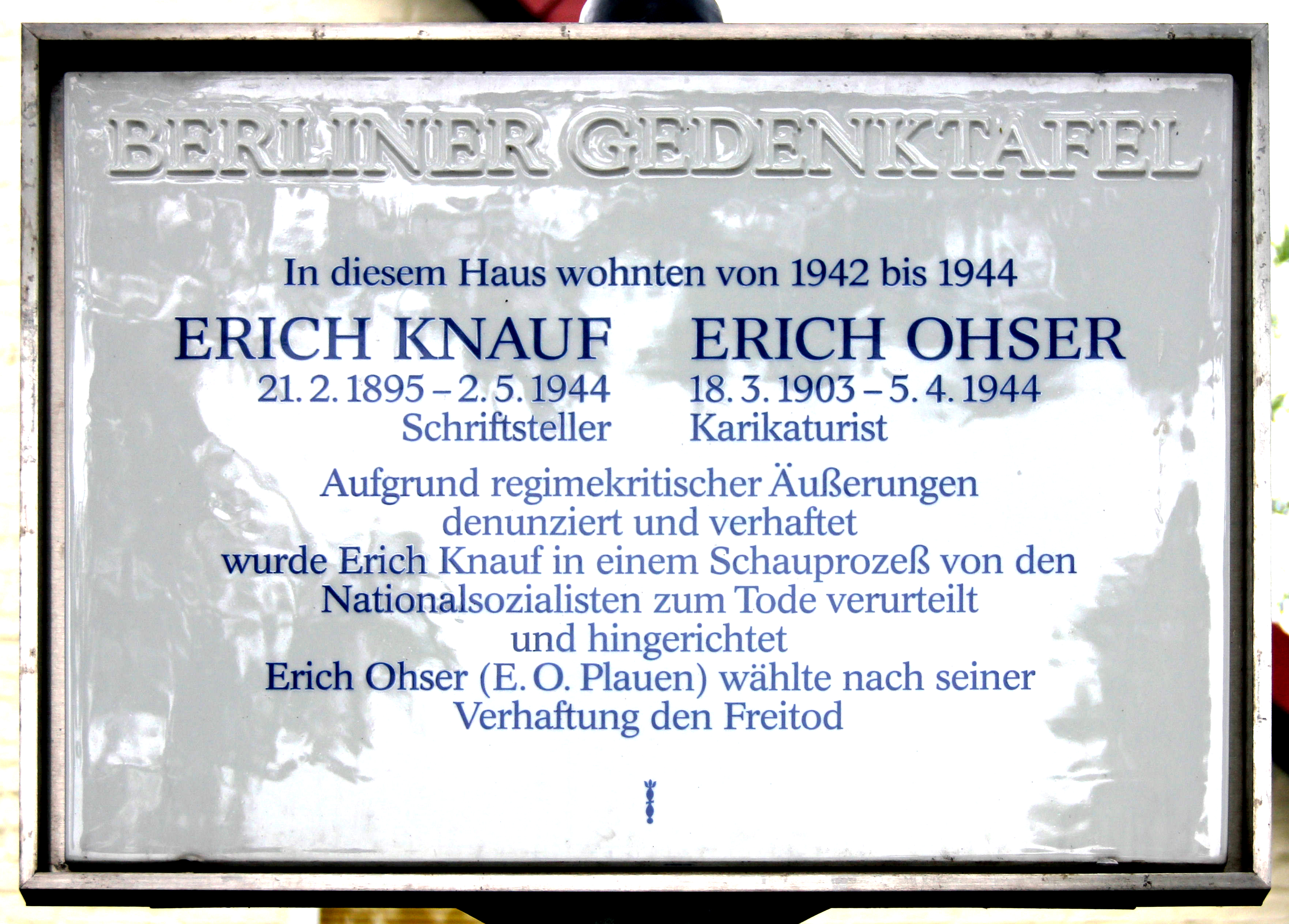
Berlin commemorative plaque at the house, Am Feldberg 3, in Berlin-Kaulsdorf

Kästner wrote an essay about the bill received by Knauf's widow. There is a commemorative plaque for Knauf and Ohser at Am Feldberg 3 in Kaulsdorf, where Knauf and Ohser were living at the time they were denounced. The plaque was installed in 1999.

There are streets named for Knauf in Brandenburg an der Havel, Plauen and Zwickau.

In 1998, Wolfgang Eckert published a biography of Erich Knauf, written from his 1985 interviews with Knauf's widow. In 1987, she bequeathed all of Knauf's papers and all rights to his works to Eckert.
