= Heinz Rühmann =

German actor (1902–1994)

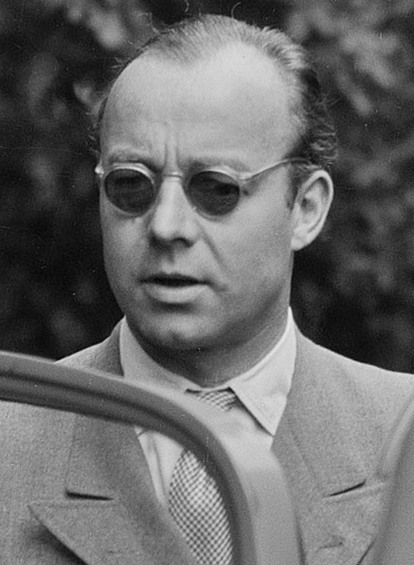
- Rühmann in 1946
- Born: Heinrich Wilhelm Hermann Rühmann; 7 March 1902; Essen, German Empire
- Died: 3 October 1994 (aged 92); Berg, Germany
- Occupations: Actor, Director
- Years active: 1926–1993
- Spouse(s): Maria Herbot (1924–1938) (divorced); Hertha Feiler (1939–1970) (her death) (1 son); Hertha Droemer (m. 1974)
- Children: 1

Heinrich „Heinz“ Wilhelm Hermann Rühmann (German: [haɪnts ˈʁyːman]; 7 March 1902 – 3 October 1994) was a German film actor who appeared in over 100 films between 1926 and 1993. He is one of the most famous and popular German actors of the 20th century, and is considered a German film legend. Rühmann is best known for playing the part of a comic ordinary citizen in film comedies such as Three from the Filling Station and The Punch Bowl. During his later years, he was also a respected character actor in films such as The Captain from Köpenick and It Happened in Broad Daylight. His only English-speaking movie was the 1965 Ship of Fools.

== Biography ==
=== Early life ===
Rühmann was born in Essen as the son of a restaurateur. His father Hermann Rühmann moved to Berlin in 1915, where he probably committed suicide a little later. The exact circumstances of death could never be clarified. Heinz began his acting career during the early 1920s and appeared in numerous theatres in Germany during the following years. His role in the 1930 movie Die Drei von der Tankstelle (The Three from the Filling Station) led him to film stardom. He remained highly popular as a comedic actor (and sometime singer) throughout the 1930s and early 1940s. He remained in Germany and continued to work during the Nazi period, as did his friend and colleague, Hans Albers.

=== Career during the Third Reich ===
During the 1933–45 period, he acted in 37 films and directed four. After January 1933, Rühmann did not speak openly about German politics, but instead kept himself as neutral as possible. He never stated a word against or towards the Nazis in the press, although he had been a supporter of democracy. In 1938, he divorced his Jewish wife Maria Herbot, who then left Germany and traveled to Stockholm where she married a Swedish actor. The divorce caused Rühmann to be accused by some of wanting to secure his career; however, the marriage had probably already fallen apart, and some sources say that he wanted to protect his wife with the divorce. After 1945, Herbot defended her ex-husband against accusations of opportunism. His second wife, Hertha Feiler, whom he married shortly after, had a Jewish grandfather, a fact that caused Rühmann problems with the Nazi cultural authorities. Rühmann retained his reputation as an apolitical star during the entire Nazi era.

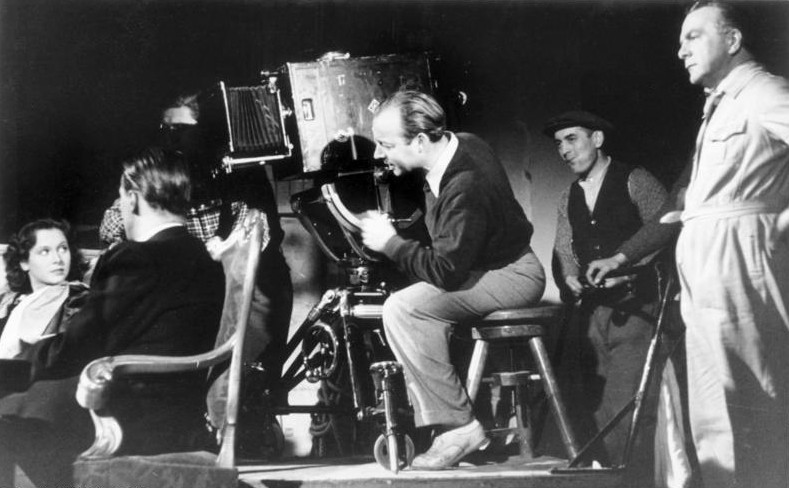
Heinz Rühmann as director (sitting on a stool, behind the camera), 1942

During the war years, Rühmann, like others, was co-opted by the State in some films. His role as lead actor in the comedy Quax the Crash Pilot was supposed to distract the populace from the war. In 1941, under the direction of Reichsfilmkammer president Carl Froelich, Rühmann played the title role in Der Gasmann, about a gas-meter reader who is suspected of foreign espionage. In 1944, the premiere of Die Feuerzangenbowle was forbidden by the Nazi film censor for "disrespect for authority". Through his good relationships with the regime, however, Rühmann was able to screen the film in public. He brought the film to the Führerhauptquartier Wolfsschanze for a private screening for Hermann Göring and others. Afterward, Göring was able to persuade Adolf Hitler to lift the ban on the film. A nostalgic comedy of mistaken identities, the film was probably the most popular of his career and later became a cult hit among college students. As a "state actor", the highest title for an actor during the Nazi era, Rühmann was not drafted into the Wehrmacht. He did have to take the basic training to become a military pilot of the reserves (as he happened to be a hobbyist pilot anyway), but for the State, Rühmann was more valuable as an actor and he was spared having to take part in the war effort. In August 1944, Joseph Goebbels put Rühmann on the Gottbegnadeten list of indispensable actors.

Rühmann was a favorite actor of Holocaust diarist Anne Frank, who pasted his picture on the wall of her room in her family's hiding place during the war, where it can still be seen today. The enormous range of Rühmann's popularity during the Nazi era is illustrated by the fact that he was also a favorite actor of Adolf Hitler and his propaganda minister Joseph Goebbels.

=== Postwar career ===
Rühmann had a difficult time resuming his career after the war, but by the mid-1950s, the former comedian had established himself again as a star, only this time as West Germany's leading character actor. In 1956, Rühmann starred in the title role of the internationally acclaimed film Der Hauptmann von Köpenick (The Captain of Köpenick), the true story of a Prussian cobbler, Wilhelm Voigt, who dressed up as an army officer and took over the town hall in Köpenick. In the days of the German Empire, the army had an exalted status and Voigt embarrassed the army officers and civil servants who obeyed him without question. Rühmann was also the leading man in the 1960 film version of The Adventures of the Good Soldier Schweik, after the novel by Austria-Hungary-Czechoslovak author Jaroslav Hašek. During the 1960s, he played the popular fictional detectives Father Brown and Inspector Maigret. In 1965, Rühmann was brought to Hollywood by producer Stanley Kramer for a supporting role as a German Jew in his all-star movie Ship of Fools.

His wife Hertha Feiler died in 1970 and Rühmann married his third wife Hertha Droemer in 1974. In his later years, he also worked as a recitator for West German television. His last film was Faraway, So Close! (1993) by Wim Wenders, in which he played an old fatherly chauffeur named Konrad. Rühmann died in October 1994, aged 92 years. He was buried in Berg-Aufkirchen, Bavaria. His popularity with German audiences continues: In 1995, he was posthumously awarded the Goldene Kamera as the "Greatest German Actor of the Century"; in 2006, a poll voted him number one in the ZDF TV-show Unsere Besten – Favorite German Actors.

== Awards ==
- 1938: Venice Film Festival: Medal for his acting in Der Mustergatte
- 1940: Appointed Staatsschauspieler by the Third Reich
- 1940: Honorary Membership in the Danish Flight Club
- 1957: Golden Gate Award (Best Actor) for Der Hauptmann von Köpenick
- 1957: Kunstpreis der Stadt Berlin
- 1957: Filmband in Gold as Best Leading Actor for Der Hauptmann von Köpenick
- 1959: Ernst-Lubitsch-Preis
- 1961: Preis der deutschen Filmkritik (Award of German Film Critics)
- 1961: Filmband in Gold as Best Leading Actor for Das schwarze Schaf
- 1962, 1963, 1964, 1965, 1967, 1968, 1969, 1971, 1972, 1973, 1978, 1984: A total of twelve Bambi Awards
- 1965: Großes Verdienstkreuz des Verdienstordens der Bundesrepublik Deutschland
- 1966: Silberner Bildschirm by the film magazine TV-Hören und Sehen
- 1967, 1968: Two Goldener Bildschirm by the film magazine TV-Hören und Sehen
- 1972: Großes Verdienstkreuz des Verdienstordens der Bundesrepublik Deutschland mit Stern
- 1972: Filmband in Gold for his "long and outstanding work" in German Film
- 1972: Goldene Leinwand (Special Award) for extraordinary merits
- 1972: Honorary Medal by the Spitzenorganisation der Filmwirtschaft (SPIO) for Lifetime Achievement (withdrawn in November 2025)
- 1977: Großes Verdienstkreuz des Verdienstordens der Bundesrepublik Deutschland mit Stern und Schulterband
- 1977: Cultural Honor Prize of the City of Munich
- 1981: Bayerischer Maximiliansorden für Wissenschaft und Kunst
- 1982: Chaplin-Stock in Silver by the Association of German Film Critics
- 1982: Goldene Ehrenmünze der Landeshauptstadt München
- 1986: Bayerischer Filmpreis: Honorary Award
- 1989: Appointment as Professor honoris causa by the Kunst und Wissenschaft of North Rhine-Westphalia
- 1990: Goldene Berolina
- 1992: Magdeburger Otto for Lifetime Achievement
- 1995: Goldene Kamera as the Greatest German Actor of the Century (posthumous)
- 2006: Voted No. 1 in the ZDF TV-show Unsere Besten – Favorite German Actors (results by a poll)

== Filmography ==
=== Film ===
- The Heart of a German Mother (1926) (with Margarete Kupfer) as Oscar
- The Girl with the Five Zeros (1927, screenplay by Béla Balázs, directed by Curtis Bernhardt) (with Adele Sandrock)
- The Three from the Filling Station (1930) (with Lilian Harvey, Willy Fritsch, Olga Chekhova, Oskar Karlweis, and the Comedian Harmonists) as Hans
- Burglars (1930) (with Lilian Harvey, Willy Fritsch, Ralph Arthur Roberts, and Oskar Sima) as Victor Sérigny
- The Man in Search of His Murderer (1931, directed by Robert Siodmak) as Hans Herfort
- Bombs on Monte Carlo (1931) (with Hans Albers, Anna Sten, and Peter Lorre) as First Officer Lt. Peter Schmidt
- My Wife, the Impostor (1931) (with Käthe von Nagy, Fritz Grünbaum, Theo Lingen, and Fritz Alberti) as Peter Bergmann, Bankbeamter
- The Virtuous Sinner (1931, directed by Fritz Kortner) (with Max Pallenberg and Dolly Haas) as Wittek
- No Money Needed (1931) (with Hans Moser and Hedy Lamarr) as Heinz Schmidt
- The Pride of Company Three (1932) (with Anton Walbrook and Rudolf Platte) as Gustav Diestelbeck
- Things Are Getting Better Already (1932) (with Dolly Haas and Fritz Grünbaum) as Ingenieur Fred Holmer
- Spoiling the Game (1932) as Willy Streblow, Rennfahrer
- The Empress and I (1933, directed by Friedrich Hollaender) (with Conrad Veidt, Lilian Harvey and Mady Christians) as Didier
- Laughing Heirs (1933, directed by Max Ophüls) (with Max Adalbert) as Peter Frank
- Homecoming to Happiness (1933) (with Luise Ullrich and Paul Hörbiger) as Amadori
- Three Bluejackets, One Blonde Girl (1933) as Kadett Heini Jäger
- There Is Only One Love (1933) (with Louis Graveure and Jenny Jugo) as Ballettmeister Eddy Blattner
- The Grand Duke's Finances (1934, Directed by Gustaf Gründgens) (with Viktor de Kowa, Fritz Alberti, and Theo Lingen) as Pelotard
- Such a Rascal (1934) (with Inge Conradi) as Dr. Hans Pfeiffer / Erich Pfeiffer
- Pipin der Kurze (1934) as August Pipin
- Ein Walzer für dich (1934) (with Louis Graveure, Camilla Horn, Adele Sandrock, and Theo Lingen) as Benjamin Cortes, Komponist
- Heinz in the Moon (1934) (with Annemarie Sörensen, Rudolf Platte, Oskar Sima, and Jarmila Novotná and Hans Moser) as Aristides Nessel
- Frasquita (Austria, 1934) as Hippolit
- Heaven on Earth (Austria, 1935) (with Theo Lingen, Hans Moser, Adele Sandrock, Hermann Thimig, Rudolf Carl, and Lizzi Holzschuh) as Peter Hilpert
- Wer wagt – gewinnt (1935) as Paul Normann, der kleine Angestellte
- Eva (Austria, 1935) (with Magda Schneider, Hans Söhnker, Hans Moser, and Adele Sandrock) as Willibald Riegele
- Der Außenseiter (1935), as Peter Bang
- Ungeküsst soll man nicht schlafen gehn (Austria, 1936) (with Theo Lingen, Hans Moser, and Liane Haid) as Franz Angerer
- Tomfoolery (1936, directed by Willi Forst) (with Anton Walbrook, Renate Müller, and Jenny Jugo) as David
- If We All Were Angels (1936) as Christian Kempenich
- Lumpaci the Vagabond (Austria, 1936, based on a play by Johann Nestroy) (with Paul Hörbiger, Hans Holt, Hilde Krahl, and Fritz Imhoff) as Schneidergeselle Zwirn
- Der Mann, von dem man spricht (Austria, 1937) (with Hans Moser, Theo Lingen, and Gusti Huber) as Toni Mathis
- The Man Who Was Sherlock Holmes (1937, directed by Karl Hartl) (with Hans Albers) as Macky McPherson
- The Model Husband (1937) (with Leny Marenbach and Hans Söhnker) as Billy Bartlett
- The Roundabouts of Handsome Karl (1938) (with Sybille Schmitz) as Karl Kramer, Kellner
- Five Million Look for an Heir (1938) (with Leny Marenbach, Vera von Langen, and Oskar Sima) as Peter Pett / Patrick Pett
- Thirteen Chairs (1938, based on the novel "The Twelve Chairs") (with Hans Moser) as Friseur Felix Rabe
- So You Don't Know Korff Yet? (1938) (with Victor Janson, Fritz Rasp) as Niels Korff
- The Leghorn Hat (1939) as Theo Farina
- Bachelor's Paradise (1939) (with Hans Brausewetter and Josef Sieber) as Hugo Bartels, Standesbeamter
- Hurrah! I'm a Father (1939) as Student Peter Ohlsen
- Clothes Make the Man (1940, based on a short story by Gottfried Keller, directed by Helmut Käutner) (with Hertha Feiler and Erich Ponto) as Schneidergeselle Wenzel
- Happiness Is the Main Thing (1941) (directed by Theo Lingen) as Axel Roth
- The Gasman (1941) (with Anny Ondra) as Hermann Knittel
- Quax the Crash Pilot (1941) as Otto Groschenbügel, 'Quax'
- Front Theatre (1942) as Himself (uncredited)
- I Entrust My Wife to You (1943) as Peter Trost
- Sophienlund (1943) as Director
- Die Feuerzangenbowle (1944) (with Erich Ponto (Professor Crey, Schnauz), Paul Henckels (Professor Bömmel), Hans Leibelt (Direktor Knauer, Zeus), Karin Himboldt (Eva Knauer), and Hilde Sessak (Marion)) as Dr. Johannes Pfeiffer / Hans Pfeiffer
- Quax in Afrika (1945) (directed by Helmut Weiss, book: Hermann Grote) (with Bruni Löbel and Beppo Brem) as Otto Groschenbügel, 'Quax', Fluglehrer
- Tell the Truth (1946) (with Georg Thomalla and Susanne von Almassy) (unfinished film)
- Der Herr vom andern Stern (1948, directed by Heinz Hilpert) (with Anneliese Römer, Hans Cossy) as Herr vom anderen Stern
- The Secret of the Red Cat (1949, directed by Helmut Weiss) (with Gustav Knuth) as André
- I'll Make You Happy (1949, directed by Sándor Szlatinay) as Peter Krüger
- That Can Happen to Anyone (1952, directed by Paul Verhoeven) (with Gustav Knuth, Gisela Schmidting, and Liesl Karlstadt) as Hugo Brinkmeyer
- Shame on You, Brigitte! (1952) (with Hans Moser, Theo Lingen, Nadja Tiller, Margarete Slezak, and Hilde Berndt) as Dr. Felix Schneider
- Not Afraid of Big Animals (1953) (with Gustav Knuth) as Emil Keller
- Mailman Mueller (1953, directed by Heinz Rühmann) (with Heli Finkenzeller) as Titus Müller
- On the Reeperbahn at Half Past Midnight (1954) (with Hans Albers and Gustav Knuth) as Pittes Breuer
- Stopover in Orly (1955, directed by Jean Dréville) (with Dany Robin, Dieter Borsche, Simone Renant, and Claus Biederstaedt) as Albert Petit
- Wenn der Vater mit dem Sohne (1955) (with Oliver Grimm and Waltraut Haas) as Teddy Lemke
- Charley's Aunt (1956) (with Hertha Feiler, Claus Biederstaedt, Walter Giller, and Paul Hörbiger) as Dr. Otto Dernburg
- The Captain from Köpenick (1956, based upon the play by Carl Zuckmayer) (directed by Helmut Käutner) as Wilhelm Voigt
- Das Sonntagskind (1956, directed by Kurt Meisel) (with Walter Giller, Günther Lüders, Werner Peters, and Siegfried Lowitz) as Anton Wibbel
- Vater sein dagegen sehr (1957, directed by Kurt Meisel) (with Marianne Koch) as Lutz Ventura
- It Happened in Broad Daylight (1958, screenplay by Friedrich Dürrenmatt, directed by Ladislao Vajda) (with Gert Fröbe, Michel Simon, Siegfried Lowitz, Ewald Balser, Berta Drews, and Sigfrit Steiner) as Oberleutnant Matthäi
- The Man Who Couldn't Say No (1958) (with Hannelore Schroth and Siegfried Lowitz) as Thomas Träumer
- The Crammer (1958, directed by Axel von Ambesser) (with Wera Frydtberg, Gert Fröbe, Klaus Löwitsch, and Peter Kraus) as Dr. Hermann Seidel
- Iron Gustav (1958, directed by Georg Hurdalek) (with Lucie Mannheim, Ernst Schröder, Karin Baal, Ingrid van Bergen) as Gustav Hartmann
- Menschen im Hotel (1959, based on a novel by Vicki Baum, directed by Gottfried Reinhardt) (with Michèle Morgan, O. W. Fischer, Gert Fröbe, and Sonja Ziemann) as Carl Kringelein
- The Man Who Walked Through the Wall (1959, directed by Ladislao Vajda) (with Nicole Courcel and Hubert von Meyerinck) as Herr Buchsbaum
- The Juvenile Judge (1960) (with Karin Baal) as Judge Dr. Ferdinand Bluhme
- My Schoolfriend (1960, directed by Robert Siodmak) (with Robert Graf, Ernst Schröder, Mario Adorf, Loni von Friedl, and Fritz Wepper) as Ludwig Fuchs
- The Good Soldier Schweik (1960, based on the novel The Good Soldier Švejk by Jaroslav Hašek, directed by Axel von Ambesser) (with Ernst Stankovski, Senta Berger, Jane Tilden, Fritz Eckhardt, and Fritz Muliar) as Josef Schwejk
- The Black Sheep (1960, a Father Brown film) (with Karl Schönböck, Maria Sebaldt, and Siegfried Lowitz) as Pater Brown
- The Liar (1961, directed by Ladislao Vajda) (with Gustav Knuth) as Sebastian Schumann
- Max the Pickpocket (1962) (with Elfie Pertramer, Hans Clarin, and Ruth Stephan) as Max Schilling
- He Can't Stop Doing It (1962) (a Father Brown film, directed by Axel von Ambesser) (with Rudolf Forster, Grit Boettcher, Ruth Maria Kubitschek, and Horst Tappert) as Pater Brown
- My Daughter and I (1963) (with Gertraud Jesserer, Gustav Knuth, Agnes Windeck, and Herta Staal) as Dr. Robert Stegemann
- The House in Montevideo (1963, based on a play by Curt Goetz, directed by Helmut Käutner) (with Ruth Leuwerik and Paul Dahlke) as Prof. Dr. Traugott Hermann Nägler
- A Mission for Mr. Dodd (1964) (with Anton Diffring and Mario Adorf) as Dr. Lancelot Dodd / Dr. Ivor Marmion
- Praetorius (1965, based on a play by Curt Goetz) (with Liselotte Pulver) as Dr. Hiob Prätorius
- Ship of Fools (1965, directed by Stanley Kramer) (with Vivien Leigh, Simone Signoret, Oskar Werner, Lee Marvin, José Ferrer, and George Segal) as Julius Lowenthal
- Who Wants to Sleep? (1965, anthology film) (with Curd Jürgens, Nadja Tiller, Ivan Desny, Letícia Román, Gert Fröbe, Catherine Deneuve, Johanna von Koczian, Richard Münch, Anita Ekberg, Peter Alexander, and Axel von Ambesser) as Professor Hellberg
- Hocuspocus (1966, based on a play by Curt Goetz) (with Liselotte Pulver and Richard Münch) as Peer Bille
- Your Money or Your Life (1966, directed by Jean-Pierre Mocky) (with Fernandel) as Henry Schmidt
- Once a Greek (1966, based on the novel Once a Greek by Friedrich Dürrenmatt) (with Irina Demick, Hannes Messemer, and Charles Régnier), as Archilochos
- Maigret and His Greatest Case (1966, based on a novel by Georges Simenon) (with Françoise Prévost, Günter Strack, Eddi Arent, and Ulli Lommel) as Kommissar Maigret
- Operation St. Peter's (1967, directed by Lucio Fulci) (with Edward G. Robinson, Jean-Claude Brialy, and Lando Buzzanca) as Cardinal Erik Braun
- The Duck Rings at Half Past Seven (1968) (with Charles Régnier) as Dr. Alexander
- The Captain (1971) (with Johanna Matz, Horst Tappert, Ernst Stankovski, Horst Janson, Günter Pfitzmann, and Teri Tordai, music: James Last) as Wilhelm Ebbs
- Oh Jonathan – oh Jonathan! (1973) (with Paul Dahlke, Peter Fricke, and Franziska Oehme) as Konsul Jonathan Reynold
- Heinz Rühmann erzählt Märchen (1975) as Narrator
- The Chinese Miracle (1977) (with Senta Berger, Harald Leipnitz, Peter Pasetti, and Christian Kohlund) as Poliakoff
- Scrounged Meals (1977, directed by Michael Verhoeven) (with Mario Adorf, René Deltgen, Elisabeth Volkmann, Karin Baal, and Joachim Fuchsberger) as Alfred Eisenhardt
- Faraway, So Close! (1993, directed by Wim Wenders) (with Otto Sander, Bruno Ganz, Nastassja Kinski, Willem Dafoe, Peter Falk, Horst Buchholz, and Solveig Dommartin) as Konrad (final film role)

=== Television ===
- Death of a Salesman (1968, based on Death of a Salesman by Arthur Miller, directed by Gerhard Klingenberg) (with Käthe Gold), as Willy Loman
- Sag’s dem Weihnachtsmann (1969, based on a play by Derek Bond), as Leslie Darwin
- Mein Freund Harvey (1970, based on Harvey by Mary Chase) (with Susi Nicoletti and Charles Régnier), as Elwood Dowd
- Photo Finish (1970, based on Photo Finish by Peter Ustinov) (with Hans Söhnker, Harry Meyen, and Erika Pluhar), as Sam Kinsale, 80 years old
- Angel in the Pawnshop (1971, based on Angel in the Pawnshop by A. B. Shiffrin) (with Sabine Sinjen), as Hilary
- The Caretaker (1973, based on The Caretaker by Harold Pinter, directed by August Everding) (with Gerd Baltus), as Davies
- Kein Abend wie jeder andere (1976, directed by Hermann Leitner) (with Peter Ustinov), as Roeder, Antiquitätenhändler
- Summa Summarum (1977), as Himself
- Diener und andere Herren (1978, anthology film, directed by Wolfgang Glück) (with Ferdy Mayne), as Kirchendiener / Butler / Edward / Ehemann
- Noch ’ne Oper (1979, based on a story by Heinz Erhardt) (with Rudolf Schock, Margit Schramm, Benno Kusche, Grit Boettcher, Gert Fröbe, Inge Meysel, Hans-Joachim Kulenkampff, Heidi Kabel, Vicco von Bülow, and Heinz Erhardt), as Golfspieler
- Balthasar im Stau (1979, anthology film, directed by Rudolf Jugert) (with Cornelia Froboess and Louise Martini), as Taxi driver Lefèvre / Taxi driver Balthasar van Krogg / Taxi driver Lord Barclay / Station master Brown
- Aller guten Dinge sind drei (1979, anthology film, directed by Rolf von Sydow) (with Günter Strack), as Friebe / Eberts / Weber
- Ein Zug nach Manhattan (1981, based on Holiday Song by Paddy Chayefsky, directed by Rolf von Sydow) (with Ulrike Bliefert, Charles Brauer, Hans Hessling, and Bruni Löbel), as Kantor Leon Sternberger
- Es gibt noch Haselnußsträucher (1983, based on Il y a encore des noisetiers by Georges Simenon, directed by Vojtěch Jasný) (with Katharina Böhm, Marion Kracht, Luitgard Im, Anneliese Uhlig, and Sigmar Solbach), as Perret-Latour

=== As director ===
- All Lies (1938)
- Lauter Liebe (1940)
- Sophienlund (1943)
- Der Engel mit dem Saitenspiel (1944)
- Die kupferne Hochzeit (1948)

== Autobiography ==
- Das war's. Erinnerungen. Ullstein, Berlin 1994, ISBN 3-548-20521-6

== Sources ==
- Franz J. Görtz, Hans Sarkowicz: Heinz Rühmann 1902 - 1994. Der Schauspieler und sein Jahrhundert. Beck, Munich (2001) ISBN 3-406-48163-9
- Torsten Körner: Ein guter Freund: Heinz Rühmann. Aufbau-Verlag, Berlin (2003) ISBN 3-7466-1925-4
- Hans-Ulrich Prost: Das war Heinz Rühmann. Bastei, Bergisch Gladbach (1994) ISBN 3-404-61329-5
- Fred Sellin: Ich brech die Herzen..., das Leben des Heinz Rühmann. Rowohlt, Reinbek (2001) ISBN 3-498-06349-9
- Gregor Ball, Eberhard Spiess, Joe Hembus (Hrsg.): Heinz Rühmann und seine Filme. Goldmann, Munich (1985) ISBN 3-442-10213-8
- Hans Hellmut Kirst, Mathias Forster, et al.: Das große Heinz Rühmann Buch. Naumann & Göbel / VEMAG, Cologne o.J., ISBN 3-625-10529-2
