= Hoegler's Mission =

1950 film

Der Auftrag Höglers
- Directed by: Gustav von Wangenheim
- Written by: Gustav von Wangenheim
- Produced by: Kurt Hahne
- Starring: Inge von Wangenheim
- Cinematography: Walter Roßkopf
- Edited by: Lena Neumann
- Music by: Ernst Hermann Meyer
- Production company: DEFA
- Distributed by: Progress Film
- Release date: 27 January 1950
- Running time: 93 minutes
- Country: German Democratic Republic
- Language: German

Der Auftrag Höglers (English-language title: Hoegler's Mission) is a German Democratic Republic fantasy movie directed by Gustav von Wangenheim. It was released in 1950.

== Plot ==
Högler, the former director of a steel plant now in East Germany, is a rich and ruthless capitalist residing in West Germany. He wants to get his hands on the technical innovations developed by Dr. Thelen, who now runs the factory after it has been nationalized. Högler tries to besmirch Thelen by organizing sabotage in the factory, threatening to kill innocent workers to destroy the scientist's reputation. Two trade union activists – the West German Maria and the East German Fritz – who have known each other since they both fought in the wartime anti-Fascist resistance, unite to thwart the capitalist's plans.

== Cast ==
- Inge von Wangenheim as Maria Steinitz
- Fritz Tillmann as Fritz Rottmann
- Gotthart Portloff as Dr. Thelen
- August Momber as Högler
- Axel Monjé as Dr. Kayser
- Alice Treff as Dr. Alice Giesebrecht
- Knut Hartwig as Dr. Petersdorf
- Horst Koch as Kern
- Lothar Firmans as Löffler
- Harry Hindemith as Krantz
- Arno Paulsen as Wiesner
- Eduard von Winterstein as Hufland
- Friedrich Richter as Dr. Breithaupt

== Production ==
At 1949, after the foundation of both the German Democratic Republic and the Federal Republic of Germany and as the existence of a Cold War between East and West became ever clearer, the East German authorities instructed DEFA's filmmakers to focus on new subjects: rather than making purely anti-Fascist films, they were now to fan anti-Western sentiment in their works. Der Auftrag Höglers was one of the first movies made under those demands. In addition, it was also the first East German film with a style conforming to Socialist Realism, that was also required by the cultural establishment.

== Reception ==
The German Film Lexicon defined the picture as "utterly lifeless, Cold War-influenced film... but interesting as a historical document."

Dagmar Schittly wrote that the movie was a typical anti-Western work of the time, "a propaganda pamphlet against the West German saboteurs." Carsten Gansel and Tanja Walenski noted that it also featured a call for class unity, by presenting the ability of East and West German trade union members to cooperate.
