= Die Feuerzangenbowle (1944 film) =

1944 film

- Film poster
- Directed by: Helmut Weiss
- Written by: Heinrich Spoerl (book and screenplay)
- Based on: Die Feuerzangenbowle by Heinrich Spoerl
- Produced by: Heinz Rühmann
- Starring: Heinz Rühmann; Erich Ponto; Paul Henckels; Hans Leibelt
- Cinematography: Ewald Daub
- Edited by: Helmuth Schönnenbeck
- Music by: Werner Bochmann
- Distributed by: UFA
- Release date: 28 January 1944
- Running time: 97 minutes
- Country: Germany
- Language: German

Die Feuerzangenbowle (German pronunciation: [ˈdiː ˈfɔʏ̯ɐt͡saŋənˌboːlə], The Fire-Tongs Bowl or The Punch Bowl) is a 1944 German comedy film directed by Helmut Weiss, based on the book of the same name. It follows the book closely, as its author, Heinrich Spoerl, also wrote the script for the film. Both tell the story of a famous writer going undercover as a student at a small-town secondary school after his friends tell him that he missed out on the best part of growing up by being educated at home. The story in the book takes place during the time of the Wilhelmine Empire in Germany. The film was produced and released in Germany during the last years of World War II and has been called a "masterpiece of timeless, cheerful escapism." The film stars Heinz Rühmann in the role of the student Hans Pfeiffer, which is remarkable as Rühmann was already 42 years old at that time. The title comes from the German alcoholic tradition of Feuerzangenbowle. Rühmann had also starred in So ein Flegel, a 1934 version of the same novel.

== Plot ==
The title refers to the Feuerzangenbowle punch consumed by a group of gentlemen in the opening scene. While exchanging nostalgic stories about their school days, the successful but somewhat stuffy young writer Dr. Johannes Pfeiffer realizes he missed out on something because he was taught by private teachers at home and never attended school. He decides to make up for it by masquerading as a pupil at a small-town high school.

As pupil "Hans Pfeiffer", he quickly gains a reputation as a prankster. Together with his classmates, he torments his teachers Crey and Bömmel and headmaster Knauer with adolescent mischief. His lady friend Marion unsuccessfully tries to persuade him to give up his foolish charade and return to his writing career. Eventually, he falls in love with the headmaster's daughter Eva and discloses his identity after masquerading as his teacher Crey in school.

In the last scene, Pfeiffer explains that everything except the Feuerzangenbowle scene in the beginning was just a product of his imagination, even his girlfriend Eva.

== Cast ==
- Heinz Rühmann as Dr. Johannes Pfeiffer/Hans Pfeiffer
- Karin Himboldt as Eva Knauer
- Hilde Sessak as Marion
- Erich Ponto as Professor Crey
- Paul Henckels as Professor Bömmel
- Hans Leibelt as principal Knauer
- Lutz Götz as teacher 1st cl Dr. Brett
- Hans Richter as Rosen
- Clemens Hasse as Rudi Knebel
- Hedwig Wangel as Crey's housekeeper
- Anneliese Würtz as Mrs Windscheidt
- Margarete Schön as Mrs Knauer
- Max Gülstorff as supervising teacher
- Egon Vogel as music teacher Fridolin
- Rudi Schippel as Luck
- Ewald Wenck as janitor Kliemke
- Albert Florath as a member of the punch bowl group
- Karl Etlinger as a member of the punch bowl group
- Georg H. Schnell as a member of the punch bowl group
- Georg Vogelsang as a member of the punch bowl group
- Walter Werner as Pfeiffer's house servant

== Film production and release ==
Die Feuerzangenbowle was produced by Ufa Studios in Potsdam-Babelsberg.

The film's release was in question when Bernhard Rust, secretary of education and former high-school teacher, bristled at the way the movie poked fun at teachers. To circumvent a ban by the censorship board, producer Heinz Rühmann presented the film to Hermann Göring at the Führerhauptquartier, where it proved to be a success. It was premiered in two UFA Palace cinemas in Berlin on 28 January 1944.

== Historic context and criticism ==
The transformation of the accomplished writer back to a not-so-innocent schoolboy is an example of the cheerful escapism popular in German films at the end of World War II. In 1942, propaganda minister Joseph Goebbels had called for the production of predominantly entertaining films in Germany to distract the population from the political and moral debacle of the war.

The charm of the teachers in the film lies in their old-fashioned attitudes and individual quirks. As representatives of an older, nonfascist generation, they were a nostalgic reminder of a lost past to the wartime generation in Germany. The film ridicules and at the same time celebrates this lost individuality through parody.

== Cult film status ==
Since the 1980s, the film has gained cult film status at many German universities. During party-like showings in university auditoriums in early December, students bring props to participate in the movie's action similar to audience participation in showings of The Rocky Horror Picture Show. For example, the audience will ring alarm clocks whenever an alarm clock rings in the movie and use flashlights when Hans Pfeiffer uses a pocket mirror to pinpoint the location of the Goths on a map behind the teacher to help a fellow student in history class. In 2006, more than 10,000 students participated in this tradition in Göttingen alone.
