= Karin Himboldt =

German actress (1920–2005)

- Born: 8 February 1920; Munich, Bavaria, Germany
- Died: 1 December 2005 (aged 85); Basel, Switzerland
- Occupation: Actress
- Years active: 1940-1959 (film)

Karin Himboldt (1920–2005) was a German film actress. She is perhaps best known for her roles in the Heinz Rühmann comedy films Quax the Crash Pilot (1941) and Die Feuerzangenbowle (1944). Her career was damaged in 1944 when the Nazi regime banned her from filming: Himboldt had denied the Nazi salute at the premiere of Die Feuerzangenbowle and was also married to a so-called "Half-Jew". She retired from film acting in 1959 and married the boss of a chemical concern in Basel.

== Filmography ==
Year	Title	Role	Notes
1940	Counterfeiters	Hanna, Kunstschülerin	
1941	Quax the Crash Pilot	Marianne Bredow	
1942	The Old Boss	Helene von Schulte	
1944	Die Feuerzangenbowle	Eva Knauer	
1944	Tierarzt Dr. Vlimmen	Nel van der Kalk	
1945	Der Scheiterhaufen		
1947	Quax in Africa	Marianne Bredow	
1949	Verführte Hände	Elizza Ebenwyl	
1951	A Tale of Five Cities	Charlotte Smith	
1951	Die Frauen des Herrn S.	Frau Sinon	
1956	Nina	Mabel	
1957	Ober zahlen	Susi	
1959	Adorable Arabella	Harriet	(final film role)
