= Lothar Firmans =

German actor

- Born: 10 November 1896; Ohrdruf, Thuringia, German Empire
- Died: 25 November 1964 (aged 68); Bad Nauheim, Hesse, West Germany
- Occupation: Actor
- Years active: 1941-1961 (film)

Lothar Firmans (1896–1964) was a German stage and film actor.

== Selected filmography ==
- Quax the Crash Pilot (1941)
- Front Theatre (1942)
- Aufruhr der Herzen (1944)
- Quax in Africa (1947)
- Marriage in the Shadows (1947)
- The Morgenrot Mine (1948)
- Girls in Gingham (1949)
- Hoegler's Mission (1950)
- Anna Susanna (1953)

== Bibliography ==
- Giesen, Rolf. Nazi Propaganda Films: A History and Filmography. McFarland & Company, 2003.
