= Nina (1956 film) =

1956 film directed by Rudolf Jugert

- Directed by: Rudolf Jugert
- Written by: Helmut Ashley; Joachim Fernau
- Based on: Romeo and Juliet in Vienna by Milo Dor and Reinhard Federmann
- Produced by: Max Koslowski
- Starring: Anouk Aimée; Karlheinz Böhm; Peter Carsten
- Cinematography: Helmut Ashley
- Edited by: Eva Kroll
- Music by: Friedrich Meyer
- Production company: Corona Filmproduktion
- Distributed by: Bavaria Film
- Release date: 21 September 1956
- Running time: 89 minutes
- Country: West Germany
- Language: German

Nina is a 1956 West German drama film directed by Rudolf Jugert and starring Anouk Aimée, Karlheinz Böhm and Peter Carsten.

The film's sets were designed by the art director Erich Kettelhut. Based on the 1954 novel Romeo and Juliet in Vienna by Milo Dor and Reinhard Federmann, it premiered in Hannover.

== Synopsis ==
In Vienna at the height of the Cold War, an American journalist falls in love with a secretary working for the Soviets, a relationship that ultimately ends in tragedy.

== Cast ==
- Anouk Aimée as Nina Iwanowa
- Karlheinz Böhm as Frank Wilson
- Peter Carsten as Major Tubaljow
- Werner Hinz as Oberst Kapulowski
- Carl Wery as Hofrat Lorenz
- Annie Rosar as Therese
- Kurt Fuß as Französischer Kulturreferent
- Franz Heigl as Ober bei Schmiedl
- Karin Himboldt as Mabel
- Günther Jerschke as Leutnant Sergejeff
- Marina Ried as Frau Sergejeff
- Hilde Schreiber as Sekretärin bei Frank
- Edward Tierney as Eddy Cunningham
- Wilhelm Walter as Der Tierarzt

== Bibliography ==
- Bock, Hans-Michael & Bergfelder, Tim. The Concise CineGraph. Encyclopedia of German Cinema. Berghahn Books, 2009.
- Goble, Alan. The Complete Index to Literary Sources in Film. Walter de Gruyter, 1999.
