= Heinz in the Moon =

1934 film directed by Robert A. Stemmle

- Directed by: Robert A. Stemmle
- Written by: Robert A. Stemmle
- Based on: Un coeur et deux paillassons by Marcel Arnac
- Starring: Heinz Rühmann; Rudolf Platte; Annemarie Sörensen; Oskar Sima
- Cinematography: Carl Drews
- Edited by: Rudolf Schaad
- Music by: Franz Grothe
- Production company: Cicero Film
- Distributed by: NDLS
- Release date: 5 September 1934
- Running time: 82 minutes
- Country: Germany
- Language: German

Heinz in the Moon (German: Heinz im Mond) is a 1934 German comedy film directed by Robert A. Stemmle and starring Heinz Rühmann, Rudolf Platte and Annemarie Sörensen. It was shot at the Halensee Studios in Berlin. The film's sets were designed by the art director Franz Schroedter. Stemmle renamed the title from Hans to Heinz to take advantage of the star's popularity.

== Cast ==
- Heinz Rühmann as Aristides Nessel
- Rudolf Platte as Arthur Kosemund, Nessels Diener
- Annemarie Sörensen as Anna Busch, Privatsekretärin
- Oskar Sima as Martin Fasan, Börsenmakler
- Erika Glässner as Helene Fasan
- Ellen Frank as Siddie Fasan
- Anita Mey as Dina, Dienstmädchen bei Fasan
- Hans Leibelt as Professor Ass
- Susi Lanner as Cleo Ass
- Inge Conradi as Corinna Linck
- Alexa von Porembsky as Emma, Dienstmädchen von Ass
- Julia Serda as Frau Bach
- Fita Benkhoff a sMadame Pythia
- Dodo van Doeren
- Friedrich Ettel
- Ernst Nessler
- Max Wilmsen
- Josef Dahmen
- Walter Steinweg
- Carl Walther Meyer
- Hans Albin

== Bibliography ==
- Hake, Sabine (2001). Popular Cinema of the Third Reich. University of Texas Press. ISBN 978-0-292-73458-6.
