= Once a Greek (film) =

1966 film

- Directed by: Rolf Thiele
- Written by: Rolf Olsen; Franz Seitz
- Based on: Once a Greek by Friedrich Dürrenmatt
- Produced by: Franz Seitz, Jr.
- Starring: Heinz Rühmann; Irina Demick; Charles Regnier
- Cinematography: Wolf Wirth
- Edited by: Ingeborg Taschner
- Music by: Rolf A. Wilhelm
- Production companies: Franz Seitz Filmproduktion; Bavaria Film
- Distributed by: Nora-Filmverleih
- Release date: 16 September 1966
- Running time: 89 minutes
- Country: West Germany
- Language: German

Once a Greek (German: Grieche sucht Griechin) is a 1966 West German comedy film directed by Rolf Thiele and starring Heinz Rühmann, Irina Demick, and Charles Regnier. It is based on the 1955 novel of the same name by Friedrich Dürrenmatt. It was made at the Bavaria Studios in Munich with location shooting in Greece, Offenburg, and the Swiss resort of Montreux. The film's sets were designed by the art director Robert Stratil.

== Cast ==
- Heinz Rühmann as Archilochos
- Irina Demick as Chloé Saloniki
- Charles Regnier as Petit-Paysan
- Hannes Messemer as Fahrcks
- Hanne Wieder as Georgette Bieler
- Walter Rilla as Staatspräsident
- Franz Kutschera as Bischof Moser
- Rudolf Rhomberg as Bruder Bibi
- Leonard Steckel as Maire Dutour
- Balduin Baas as Auguste
- Walter Buschhoff as Dolder
- Birgit Ashbahs as Marianne
- Ingrid Simon as Sophie
- Jürgen Clausen as Théophil
- Susanne Hsiao as Magda Maria
- Rudolf Forster as Butler
- Michael Maien
- Hans Leibelt

== Bibliography ==
- Bock, Hans-Michael; Bergfelder, Tim, eds. (2009). The Concise Cinegraph: Encyclopaedia of German Cinema. New York: Berghahn Books. ISBN 978-1-57181-655-9.
