= Once a Greek =

1955 novel by Friedrich Dürrenmatt

- First edition (cover art by Michael Mathias Prechtl)
- Author: Friedrich Dürrenmatt
- Original title: Grieche sucht Griechin
- Translator: Richard Winston; Clara Winston
- Language: German
- Publisher: Verlag der Arche
- Publication date: 1955
- Publication place: Switzerland
- English publication date: 1965
- Pages: 199

Once a Greek is a 1955 novel by the Swiss writer Friedrich Dürrenmatt. Its original German title is Grieche sucht Griechin, which means "Greek man seeks Greek woman". It tells the story of a shy, middle-aged book-keeping assistant, who becomes popular and successful overnight when he decides to get married.

== Reception ==
Kurt Vonnegut reviewed the book for The New York Times in 1965. Vonnegut compared Dürrenmatt's stories to Swiss clockworks, and wrote that the author "is a fascinating, endearing maker of clocks. He chooses to write this way, invented this way of writing. The puzzle is: He seems to be attacking something brilliantly, but what is it?" Vonnegut wrote: "His jokes are Jungian jokes, it seems to me--private, Kraut, mythological. And, while he seems to protest against the absurdities of modern times, he doesn't care enough about them to learn much about them. What we have here is an elegant exploration of a Jungian dream."

== Film adaptation ==
In 1966 it was turned into a West German film Once a Greek directed by Rolf Thiele and starring the comedian Heinz Rühmann.

== See also ==
- 1955 in literature
- Swiss literature
