= Gustav von Wangenheim =

German actor (1895–1975)

- Born: Ingo Clemens Gustav Adolf Freiherr von Wangenheim; 18 February 1895; Wiesbaden, Province of Nassau, Kingdom of Prussia, German Empire
- Died: 5 August 1975 (aged 80); East Berlin, East Germany
- Spouse: Ingeborg Franke (m. 1931; div. 1954)
- Children: 4, including Friedel

Ingo Clemens Gustav Adolf Freiherr von Wangenheim (18 February 1895 – 5 August 1975) was a German actor, screenwriter and director.

== Biography ==
=== Early life ===
Wangenheim was born Ingo Clemens Gustav Adolf Freiherr von Wangenheim in Wiesbaden, Hesse, to parents Eduard Clemens Freiherr von Wangenheim and Minna Mengers. Both of his parents were performers; his father, who used the stage name Eduard von Winterstein, appeared in over 200 films between 1910 and 1960. He briefly served in the Imperial German Army during World War I but was discharged in 1915 because of an eye injury.

=== Career ===
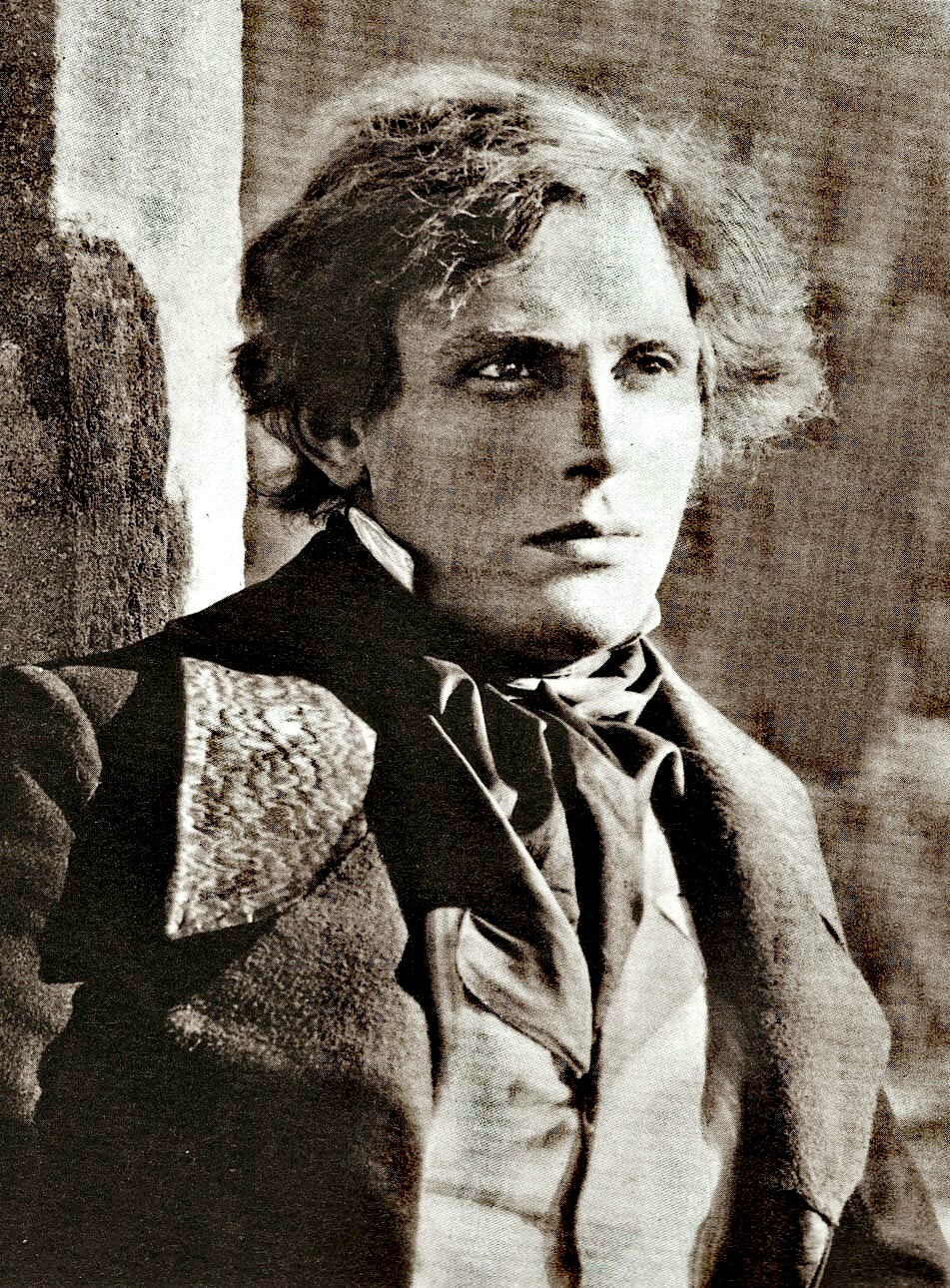
Wangenheim as Thomas Hutter in Nosferatu (1922).

Wangenheim made his screen debut in 1914 in Passionels Tagebuch and went on to star in many silent features. Among his works were Fritz Lang's early science fiction film, Frau im Mond (as "Windegger"), and Karl Heinz Martin's Das Haus zum Mond. In 1921, Wangenheim was cast in what would prove to be his most enduring role, that of Thomas Hutter in F. W. Murnau's Nosferatu.

A member of the Communist Party of Germany since 1921, Wangenheim founded the Communist theatre company Die Truppe '31 in 1931. Die Truppe '31 produced three plays, authored and directed by Wangenheim, before it was shut down by order of the Nazi regime in 1933.

Wangenheim fled Nazi Germany in the 1930s and found refuge in the Soviet Union. While living in exile at Moscow's Hotel Lux, he continued writing and producing films, such as Der Kampf (1936), an anti-Nazi protest film, and was the head of the German language Cabaret "Kolonne Links". In 1936, during the Stalinist purges, he denounced his colleagues Carola Neher and Anatol Becker as Trotskyites.

Becker was executed and Neher died in the Gulag system after five years in prison. Von Wangenheim's son Friedel later stated that the accusations that his father had denounced Neher and Becker were one-sided and inaccurate. Friedel claimed that his father, after being arrested by the NKVD and a lengthy interrogation, had signed a statement that implicated Carola Neher as being "anti soviet" but had explicitly rejected the accusation that Neher and her husband Anatol Becker had planned to murder Stalin.

Wangenheim was a founding member of the National Committee for a Free Germany. After World War II, he returned to East Germany, where he worked for the DEFA as screenwriter and director.

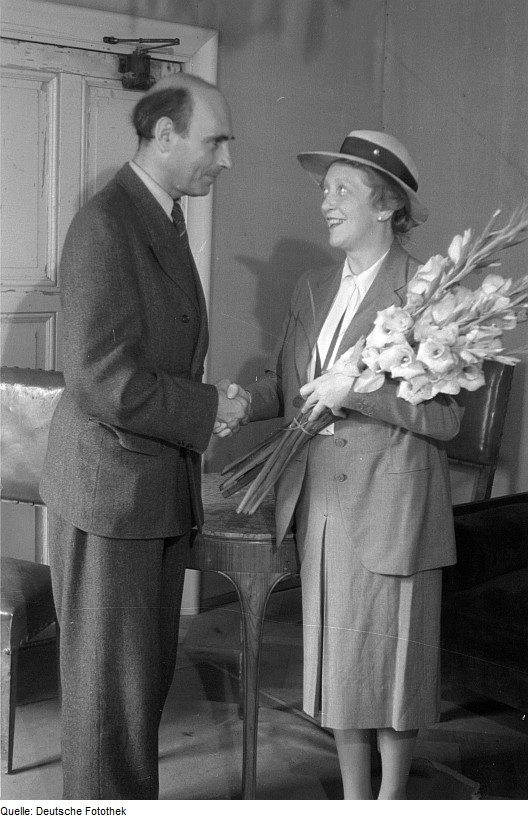
Gustav von Wangenheim with Käthe Dorsch

Wangenheim was married to Inge von Wangenheim from 1931 to 1954. The couple had two sons, Friedel and Edi, and twin daughters, Elisabeth and Eleonora von Wangenheim. Wangenheim died in East Berlin on 5 August 1975 and was buried in the Friedrichsfelde cemetery in Berlin.

== Filmography ==
- 1916: Homunculus, 1. Teil
- 1916: Passionels Tagebuch
- 1916: Homunculus. 3. Teil: Die Liebestragödie des Homunculus - Heinrich
- 1916: Der Letzte eines alten Geschlechtes
- 1916: Das Leid der Liebe
- 1917: The Coquette
- 1918: Ferdinand Lassalle - Janko von Rakowitza
- 1919: Kitsch. Tragödie einer Intrigantin
- 1919: Der Tempel der Liebe
- 1919: Die Welteroberer
- 1920: Kohlhiesel's Daughters - Paul Seppl
- 1920: Romeo and Juliet in the Snow - Romeo
- 1920: Panic in the House of Ardon
- 1920: Der Tempel der Liebe
- 1921: The House on the Moon - Andreas, sein Sohn
- 1922: Nosferatu - Hutter
- 1922: The Fire Ship
- 1923: The Pilgrimage of Love - Dr. Egil Rostrup
- 1923: The Stone Rider - Jäger
- 1923: Schatten – Eine nächtliche Halluzination - Her lover
- 1929: Woman in the Moon - Ingenieur Hans Windegger
- 1931: Danton - Desmoulins (final film role)
- 1936: Der Kampf (director / writer)
- 1948: Und wieder 48 (director / writer)
- 1949: Hoegler's Mission (director / writer)
- 1953-1954: Gefährliche Fracht (director)
- 1955: Heimliche Ehen (director / writer)
- 1955-1956: Lied über dem Tal (director)

== References in popular culture ==
- In the 2000 film Shadow of the Vampire, which depicted the production of Nosferatu, Eddie Izzard portrayed Wangenheim.
- Footage of Wangenheim's performance as Hutter appears in the Queen video for "Under Pressure."
