= Quax in Africa =

1947 film

- Film poster
- Directed by: Helmut Weiss
- Written by: Hermann Grote (story)
- Produced by: Heinz Rühmann
- Starring: Heinz Rühmann; Hertha Feiler; Lothar Firmans
- Cinematography: Ewald Daub
- Edited by: Helmuth Schönnenbeck
- Music by: Werner Bochmann
- Production company: Terra Film
- Distributed by: Nordwestdeutscher Filmverleih
- Release dates: 16 May 1947 (Sweden); 22 May 1953 (West Germany)
- Running time: 95 minutes
- Country: West Germany
- Language: German

Quax in Africa (German: Quax in Afrika) is a German comedy adventure film produced from 1943–1944 and released in 1947, directed by Helmut Weiss and starring Heinz Rühmann, Hertha Feiler, and Lothar Firmans. It is a sequel to the 1941 film Quax the Crash Pilot.

== Plot ==
The year is circa 1932, and the initial setting is Bavaria, Germany. The novice aviator Otto Groschenbügel, nicknamed Quax (see the previous film Quax the Crash Pilot), has advanced to become a professional flying instructor at the Flying School of Bergried. Although by nature a congenial fellow, he decides to adopt an authoritarian manner when learning of his pupils' unruly womanising. However his stern lectures that women have no place on an aerodrome are undermined when his friend Marianne unexpectedly visits him, and even more so when two female trainee pilots are assigned to him. Soon, the flying school's chief instructor announces that the Europaflug contest (an air rallye from Germany via Spain to Africa and back) is scheduled to start from Bergried, and Quax together with one male and the two female trainee pilots take part, by which time Quax is finally persuaded of the women's flying abilities. En route in Spain they indulge in local dances and merriment and Quax casts off his disciplinarian persona. In Africa, the team crash their two planes and are discovered by natives. Quax is obliged to marry the tribal chief's daughter Banani, and they take part in an African ritual dance. Finally a rescue plane arrives and returns the aviators to their home country.

== Production ==
Both the precursor film Quax the Crash Pilot and the sequel Quax in Africa are based on books written by Dr. Herrmann Grote (1904–1980). The first book carried the same title, Quax der Bruchpilot, as the first film and was published in 1936, while the second book was originally published under the title Quax auf Abwegen [Quax off track] before being republished as Quax in Afrika.

It was made at the Babelsberg Studios in Potsdam. Some scenes were shot at an airfield near the Bavarian town of Kempten while parts of Brandenburg doubled for the African scenes. The film's sets were designed by Willi Herrmann.

Although the female lead from the previous film, Karin Himboldt, appears again, the principal romantic interest is now played by Rühmann's real-life wife Hertha Feiler.

The film was shot from July 1943 to January 1944. The German Film Review Office passed the film in February 1945, but it was not released by the end of the war. In 1945 it was banned by the Allied occupation authorities. It was first distributed in Sweden in 1947, and obtained a full West German release in 1953.

== Cast ==
- Heinz Rühmann as Otto 'Quax' Groschenbügel, flying instructor
- Hertha Feiler as Renate, trainee pilot
- Lothar Firmans as Hansen, flying instructor
- Karin Himboldt as Marianne Bredow
- Robert Tessen as Fips, trainee pilot
- Bruni Löbel as Julchen, trainee pilot
- Beppo Brem as Alois
- Adolf Fischer as Brückner, flying instructor
- Georg Vogelsang as Krehlert, elderly gentleman
- Lutz Götz as Kühn
- Marie Nejar, credited as Daisy Johnson as Banani, daughter of the African tribal chief Aruba
- Adrian Hoven as extra
- Georg Irmer as Mertens
- Ali Ghito
- Walter Gross
- Louis Brody as the medicine man
- Josef Kamper

== See also ==
- Überläufer

== Bibliography ==
- Chapman, James (2008). War and Film. London: Reaktion Books. ISBN 978-1-86189-347-5.
