= Such a Rascal =

1934 film directed by Robert A. Stemmie

- Film poster, 1934
- So ein Flegel
- Directed by: Robert A. Stemmle
- Written by: Hans Reimann; Robert A. Stemmle
- Based on: Die Feuerzangenbowle by Heinrich Spoerl
- Produced by: Felix Pfitzner
- Starring: Heinz Rühmann; Ellen Frank; Annemarie Sörensen
- Cinematography: Carl Drews
- Edited by: Rudolf Schaad
- Music by: Harald Böhmelt
- Production company: Cicero Film
- Distributed by: Lloyd-Film
- Release date: 13 February 1934
- Running time: 81 minutes
- Country: Germany
- Language: German

Such a Rascal (German: So ein Flegel) is a 1934 German comedy film directed by Robert A. Stemmie and starring Heinz Rühmann, Ellen Frank and Annemarie Sörensen. It was shot at the EFA Studios in Berlin. The film's sets were designed by the art directors Karl Böhm and Erich Czerwonski. Based on the novel Die Feuerzangenbowle by Heinrich Spoerl, Rühmann starred in the double role of the brothers Pfeiffer in this lesser known movie a decade before playing Hans Pfeiffer in the more popular 1944 version.

== Synopsis ==
It modifies the story of the novel by introducing the concept of two brothers Pfeiffer switching places: While the younger brother takes over his elder brother's job, the older brother attends the younger one's school.

== Cast ==
- Heinz Rühmann as Dr. Hans Pfeiffer/Erich Pfeiffer
- Ellen Frank as Marion Eisenhut
- Inge Conradi as Ilse Bundschuh
- Annemarie Sörensen as Eva Knauer
- Jakob Tiedtke as Rektor Knauer
- Else Bötticher as Frau Knauer
- Oskar Sima as Professor Crey
- Franz Weber as Bömmel, Oberlehrer
- Karl Platen as Oertel, Pedell
- Rudolf Platte as Rettig, Tanzlehrer
- Henriette Steinmann as Frau Windscheidt
- Maria Seidler as Frau Bundschuh
- Erwin van Roy as Bürglein, Regisseur
- Walter Steinweg as Springer, Schauspieler
- Anita Mey as Verehrerin
- Evelyn Roberti as Soubrette

== Bibliography ==
- Goble, Alan. The Complete Index to Literary Sources in Film. Walter de Gruyter, 1999.
- Niven, Bill, Hitler and Film: The Führer's Hidden Passion. Yale University Press, 2018.
