= Heimat, deine Sterne =

Song written by Erich Knauf and Werner Bochmann

"Heimat, deine Sterne" (Homeland, Your Stars) is a German song written by Erich Knauf and Werner Bochmann for the comedy film Quax the Crash Pilot (Quax, der Bruchpilot) in 1941.
