= Hurrah! I'm a Father =

1939 film

- Directed by: Kurt Hoffmann
- Written by: Thea von Harbou
- Starring: Heinz Rühmann; Albert Florath; Ursula Grabley; Carola Höhn
- Cinematography: Oskar Schnirch
- Edited by: Helmuth Schönnenbeck
- Music by: Hans Lang
- Production companies: Cine-Allianz Tonfilm; UFA
- Release date: 16 November 1939
- Running time: 81 minutes
- Country: Germany
- Language: German

Hurrah! I'm a Father or Hurrah! I'm a Papa (German: Hurra, ich bin Papa) is a 1939 German comedy film directed by Kurt Hoffmann and starring Heinz Rühmann, Albert Florath, and Carola Höhn.

It was shot at the Marienfelde and Tempelhof Studios in Berlin. The film's sets were designed by the art directors Heinrich Beisenherz and Alfred Bütow.

== Synopsis ==
Peter, an underachieving student with a slightly debauched lifestyle, ignores his wealthy farmer father's attempts to get him to reform. He is forced to change his ways when someone leaves a child in his apartment with a note saying that he is the child's father. He hires a young woman to work as the child's nurse, not realizing that she is really the child's mother.

== Cast ==
- Heinz Rühmann as Student Peter Ohlsen
- Albert Florath as Ludwig Ohlsen
- Walter Schuller as Hänschen Ohlsen
- Carola Höhn as Kindergärtnerin Kathrin Gebhardt
- Ursula Grabley as Nina
- Marianne Stanior as Charlott
- Hansi Arnstaedt as Hausdame Frau Koch
- Bruno Fritz as Chauffeur Willi
- Ilse Stobrawa as Margret
- Ludwig Schmitz as Wirt Lütjohann
- Wolf Ackva as Freund von Peter
- Sophie Cieslak as Freundin von Peter
- Wolfgang Keppler as Freund von Peter
- Marianne Kiwitt as Freundin von Peter
- Eberhard Leithoff as Freund von Peter
- Karin Luesebrink as Freundin von Peter
- Rolf von Nauckhoff as Freund von Peter
- Rudolf Schündler as Freund von Peter
- Ursula Ulrich as Freundin von Peter
- Olga Limburg as Olga Limburg
- Karl Jüstel as Chauffeur bei Ludwig Ohlsen
- Michael von Newlinsky as Oberkellner
- Willi Witte as Kellner im Hotelsaal
- Christa Dilthey as Kindermädchen

== Bibliography ==
- Hake, Sabine (2001). Popular Cinema of the Third Reich. Austin: University of Texas Press. ISBN 978-0-292-73458-6.
