= Counterfeiters (1940 film) =

1940 film

- Directed by: Hermann Pfeiffer
- Written by: Walter Maisch; Per Schwenzen
- Produced by: Eduard Kubat
- Starring: Kirsten Heiberg; Rudolf Fernau; Karin Himboldt
- Cinematography: Walter Pindter
- Edited by: Alexandra Anatra
- Music by: Michael Jary
- Production company: Terra Film
- Distributed by: Terra Film
- Release date: 19 November 1940
- Running time: 86 minutes
- Country: Germany
- Language: German

Counterfeiters (German: Falschmünzer) is a 1940 German crime film directed by Hermann Pfeiffer and starring Kirsten Heiberg, Rudolf Fernau and Karin Himboldt.

The film's sets were designed by the art director Max Mellin. It was shot at the Babelsberg and Tempelhof Studios in Berlin, and on location in Tirol.

== Cast ==
- Kirsten Heiberg as Juliette Balouet, Betrügerin
- Rudolf Fernau as Gaston de Frossard, Kopf der Fälscherbande
- Karin Himboldt as Hanna, Kunstschülerin
- Hermann Brix as Herbert Engelke, Grafiker
- Theodor Loos as Professor Bassi
- Hermann Speelmans as Karl Bergmann aka Harry Gernreich
- Leo Peukert as Johann Weidling
- Lutz Götz as Poppinger, Viehhändler
- Axel Monjé as Obersturmführer Dr. Bradt, Kriminalkommissar
- Max Gülstorff as Zeltlin, Kriminalinspektor aus Zürich
- Ingeborg von Kusserow as Else Bornemann
- Peter Elsholtz as Fälscher
- Jakob Tiedtke as Papa Schmidt, Toilettenmann
- Hans Stiebner as Nico, Fälscher
- Oscar Sabo as Oskar, Komplize der Bande in Berlin
- Bruno Hübner as Hubert Bonifatius, ein bekannter der Schwestern Lieb
- Olga Engl as Antonie Lieb, Inhaberin des Schuhgeschäfts
- Julia Serda as Elvira
- Christa Dilthey as Juliette, Zofe auf Schloß Hohenegg
- Franz Arzdorf as Kellner im Berliner Restaurant
- Walter Bechmann as Hoteldiener in Zürich
- Friedrich Beug as Handlanger in der Fälscherbande
- Heinz Berghaus as Willy, der Kneipenwirt
- Eduard Bornträger as Hotelportier
- Erich Dunskus as Taxichauffeur
- Fritz Eckert as Kriminalbeamter im Polizeilabor
- Wilhelm Egger-Sell as Hotelportier
- Fred Goebel as Kellner im Berliner Restaurant
- Knut Hartwig as Kriminalbeamter, der Poppinger verhört
- Oskar Höcker as Polizist am Revier
- Fred Köster as Paketbote im Züricher Hotel
- Hermann Meyer-Falkow as Polizeibeamter in Uniform
- Paul Mederow as Tomaselli, Kunstsammler
- Michael von Newlinsky as Kellner im Berliner Restaurant
- Georg A. Profé as Kellner im Berliner Restaurant
- Klaus Pohl as Straßenzeitungsverkäufer
- Walter Pose as Polizist am Revier
- Alfred Pussert as Weber, Techniker im Polizeilabor
- Max Vierlinger as Kassierer im Hotel
- Ewald Wenck as Taxichauffeur
- Willy Witte as Obersturmführer Kluger der Berliner Kriminalpolizei
- Max Harry Ernst as Gast bei Tomaselli
- Angelo Ferrari as Ein Mitglied der Fälscherbande
- Benno Gellenbeck as Professor der Zeichenklasse
- Karl Jüstel as Gast bei Tomaselli
- Alfred Karen as Gast bei Tomaselli
- Isolde Laugs as Frau im Zeitungskiosk
- Bruno Tillessen as Ober im Hotelspeisesaal

== Bibliography ==
- Rolf Giesen. Nazi Propaganda Films: A History and Filmography. McFarland, 2003.
