= Sophienlund =

1943 film

- Directed by: Heinz Rühmann
- Written by: Fritz Peter Buch; Helmut Weiss
- Based on: Sophienlund by Helmut Weiss and Fritz von Woedtke
- Produced by: Heinz Rühmann
- Starring: Harry Liedtke; Käthe Haack; Hannelore Schroth
- Cinematography: Willy Winterstein
- Edited by: Helmuth Schönnenbeck
- Music by: Werner Bochmann
- Production company: Terra Film
- Distributed by: Deutsche Filmvertriebs
- Release date: 26 February 1943
- Running time: 92 minutes
- Country: Germany
- Language: German

Sophienlund is a 1943 German comedy film directed by Heinz Rühmann and starring Harry Liedtke, Käthe Haack and Hannelore Schroth. It was based on a play of the same title by Helmut Weiss and Fritz von Woedtke. It was shot at the Babelsberg Studios in Berlin and on location around the baroque Buckow Castle. The film's sets were designed by the art director Willi Herrmann. The 1956 Austrian film Engagement at Wolfgangsee was an Agfacolor remake directed by Helmut Weiss.

== Synopsis ==
When the Eckberg family gather at the manor house Sophienlund, it transpires that two twin brothers are not birth children of the family, and therefore one of them can marry the girl he thought to be his sister.

== Cast ==
- Harry Liedtke as Erick Eckberg
- Käthe Haack as Sigrid Eckberg
- Hannelore Schroth as Gabriele Eckberg
- Robert Tessen as Michael Eckberg
- Fritz Wagner as Knut Eckberg
- Stina Sorbon as Birgit Lundquist
- Hans Quest as Jürgen
- Jeanette Bethge as Selma
- Clemens Hasse as Kramer

== Bibliography ==
- Goble, Alan. The Complete Index to Literary Sources in Film. Walter de Gruyter, 1999.
