= Friedel von Wangenheim =

German playwright, actor and songwriter (1939–2001)

- Born: 11 May 1939; Moscow, Russia
- Died: 6 April 2001 (aged 61); Berlin, Germany
- Burial place: Dorotheenstadt cemetery
- Occupations: playwright and actor
- Spouse: Renate Reinecke (1989–2001)
- Parent(s): Gustav von Wangenheim; Inge von Wangenheim

Friedel Freiherr von Wangenheim (11 May 1939 – 6 April 2001) was a German songwriter, playwright, and actor.

== Life ==
Friedel von Wangenheim came from a family of famous German stage actors. His grandfather was Eduard von Winterstein, his parents Inge and Gustav von Wangenheim. Friedel von Wangenheim himself was married in a second marriage to the actress Renate Reinecke.

In the GDR Wangenheim worked as a playwright for the Friedrichstadt-Palast and wrote chansons for the men's vocal quartet Die Mimosen. His last work was Claire Waldoff. Stations of a cabaret career, which was performed in 2000 at the Charlottenburger Theater Tribune with Angelika Mann in the role of Claire Waldoff.

He also appeared as an actor (for example, at the current Eduard-von-Winterstein-Theater in Annaberg-Buchholz, which his grandfather opened in 1897 as Egmont), including 1999 in the lead role of Rosa von Praunheim's feature film The Einstein of Sex whose screenplay he co-authored. In the same year, the detective novel Kamera läuft, Herr Kommissar was released, whom he had written under the pseudonym "vW" together with Jan Eik.

== Death ==
On 6 April 2001, Friedel von Wangenheim took his own life. eight years to the day of his mother's death. He is buried in the cemetery of the Dorotheenstadt and Friedrichswerder communities. The tomb is located in the abbot CU2.

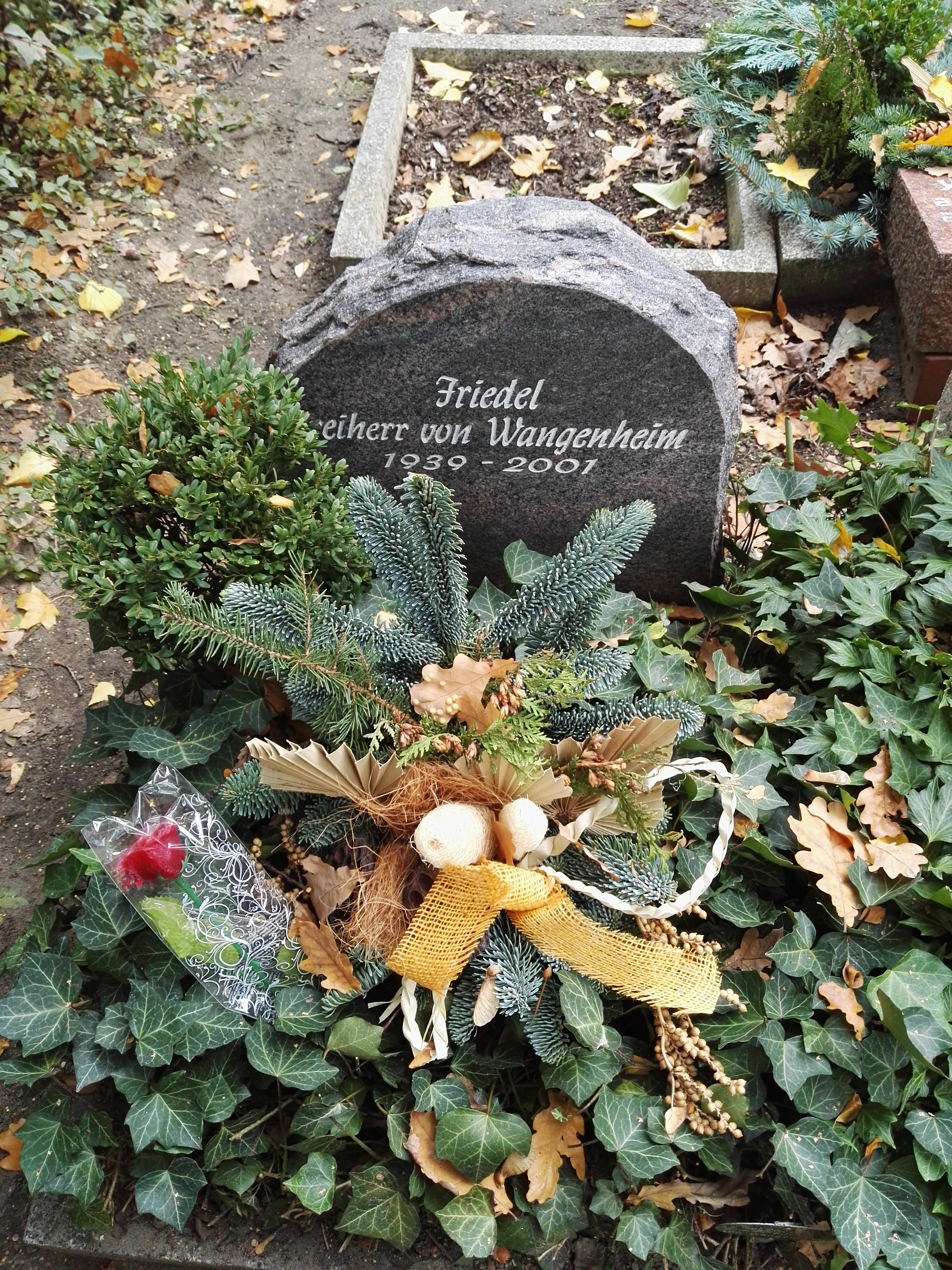
Grabstätte
