= Front Theatre =

- German film poster
- German: Fronttheater
- Directed by: Arthur Maria Rabenalt
- Written by: George Hurdalek; Hans Fritz Köllner; Werner Plücker; Werner Scharf
- Produced by: Otto Lehmann
- Starring: Heli Finkenzeller; René Deltgen; Lothar Firmans
- Cinematography: Oskar Schnirch
- Edited by: Helmuth Schönnenbeck
- Music by: Werner Bochmann
- Production company: Terra Film
- Distributed by: Deutsche Filmvertriebs
- Release date: 4 September 1942
- Running time: 95 minutes
- Country: Germany
- Language: German

Front Theatre (German: Fronttheater) is a 1942 German drama film directed by Arthur Maria Rabenalt and starring Heli Finkenzeller, René Deltgen and Lothar Firmans.

It was made at the Babelsberg Studios in Berlin and the Cinetone Studios in Amsterdam. Location shooting took place in occupied Bordeaux and Greece. The film's sets were designed by the art directors Carlo Böhm and Willi Herrmann.

== Plot ==
A woman gives up her successful acting career to support her doctor husband. Later she takes part in entertainment for German forces during the Second World War.

== Cast ==
- Heli Finkenzeller as Lena Meinhardt-Andres
- René Deltgen as Dr. Paul Meinhardt
- Lothar Firmans as Langhammer, director
- Wilhelm Strienz as chamber singer Herrmann
- Hedi Höpfner as Hilde Keller
- Margot Höpfner as Monika Keller
- Willi Rose as Alwin Sommer
- Rudolf Schündler as Walter Hülsen
- Bruni Löbel as Gerda Hoffmann
- Hilde von Stolz as Edith Reiß
- Gerhard Dammann as Pietsch
- Adolf Fischer as Otto Zielke
- Armin Münch as Kummer
- Ernö René as Bosco
- Alice Treff as Beamtin beim Arbeitsamt
- Elsa Wagner as Alte Schauspielerin
- Hermann Pfeiffer as Reiseleiter einer Künstlertruppe
- Ernst Karchow as Dr. Gall
- Heinz Ruhmann as himself
