= Lutz Götz =

German actor (1891–1958)

- Born: 12 August 1891; Munich, Bavaria, German Empire
- Died: 3 October 1958 (aged 67); East Berlin, East Germany
- Occupation: Actor
- Years active: 1919-1958 (film)

Lutz Götz (1891 – 1958) was a German stage and film actor.

== Selected filmography ==
- The Immortal Vagabond (1930)
- Patriots (1937)
- Legion Condor (1939)
- Congo Express (1939)
- The Wedding Trip (1939)
- Counterfeiters (1940)
- Above All Else in the World (1941)
- Jakko (1941)
- Six Days of Leave (1941)
- Quax the Crash Pilot (1941)
- Sky Hounds (1942)
- Tonelli (1943)
- A Salzburg Comedy (1943)
- The Golden Spider (1943)
- Die Feuerzangenbowle (1944)
- Tell the Truth (1946)
- Quax in Africa (1947)
- The Last Year (1951)
- Prosecutor Corda (1953)
- The Wishing-Table (1956)

== Bibliography ==
- Richards, Jeffrey. Visions of Yesterday. Routledge & Kegan Paul, 1973.
