= Axel Monjé =

German actor

- Born: 6 June 1910; Bremerhaven, German Empire
- Died: 18 August 1962 (aged 52); West Berlin, West Germany
- Occupation: Actor
- Years active: 1939-1961 (film)

Axel Monjé (1910 – 1962) was a German stage and film actor.

== Selected filmography ==
- Central Rio (1939)
- The Strange Woman (1939)
- Counterfeiters (1940)
- My Life for Ireland (1941)
- Hoegler's Mission (1950)
- Come Back (1953)
- The Mosquito (1954)
- The Little Czar (1954)
- Emil and the Detectives (1954)
- The Seven Dresses of Katrin (1954)
- Captain Wronski (1954)
- Peter Shoots Down the Bird (1959)
- Freddy, the Guitar and the Sea (1959)

== Bibliography ==
- Rolf Giesen. Nazi Propaganda Films: A History and Filmography. McFarland, 2003.
