= Blocked Signals =

1948 film

- Directed by: Johannes Meyer
- Written by: Edith Hamann; Eberhard Keindorff; Wolf Neumeister; Helmuth Schönnenbeck
- Produced by: Heinz Laaser
- Starring: Heidi Kürschner; Heinz Engelmann; Wolfgang Lukschy
- Cinematography: Georg Bruckbauer
- Edited by: Anneliese Schönnenbeck
- Music by: Hans-Martin Majewski
- Production company: Ondia-Filmproduktion
- Distributed by: Panorama-Film
- Release date: 17 December 1948
- Running time: 97 minutes
- Country: Germany
- Language: German

Blocked Signals (German: Blockierte Signale) is a 1948 German thriller film directed by Johannes Meyer and starring Heidi Kürschner, Heinz Engelmann, and Wolfgang Lukschy.

== Plot ==
The story takes place in the port of Hamburg in 1947. The manager of a transport company is found dead, he has been murdered. The police investigation revealed that sinister business was being transacted through the company: Drugs and medicines in particular were trafficked or smuggled. The traffickers prove to be tough as nails in carrying out their unlawful activities. The young helmsman Klaus Kröger also feels this when he gets involved in the affair. But who is behind these machinations, who is the head of the gang? Bruno Kalpak and the forwarder Löllgen come under suspicion. Eventually, the go-getting protagonist takes the initiative and helps the investigating police inspector Ostendorff to dig out the entire gang when the latter is about to rob an entire freight train on the banks of the Elbe. The murderer also falls into the clutches of the police.

== Background ==
Blocked Signals was created in the film studios of Hamburg-Volksdorf and Hamburg-Ohlstedt as well as in the port of Hamburg (outdoor shots). The film passed the Allied film censors in December 1948 and premiered on 17 December 1948 in Göttingen. The Berlin premiere took place on 16 September 1949 in the west of the city.

Friedrich Kurth took over the production management. Peter Röhrig designed the film structures.

== Cast ==
- Heidi Kürschner as Mary-Ann
- Heinz Engelmann as Klaus Kröger, Steuermann
- Wolfgang Lukschy as Bruno Kalpak
- Walter Franck as Löllgen, Spediteur
- Carl Voscherau as Brinkmann
- Hubert von Meyerinck as Der Baron
- Hilla Höfer as "Bulli"—Frau Garfs
- S.O. Schoening as Garfs
- Helmuth Rudolph as Ostendorff, the police inspector
- Hans Richter as Ostendorff's assistant
- Horst Beck as Assistant Franke
- Hans Kettler as Maraun
- K. Kramer as Jensen
- Konrad Mayerhoff as Petrowitsch

== Bibliography ==
- Bock, Hans-Michael; Bergfelder, Tim, eds. (2009). The Concise Cinegraph: Encyclopaedia of German Cinema. New York: Berghahn Books. ISBN 978-1-57181-655-9.
