= The Battle of Bademunde =

1931 German comedy film

- Directed by: Philipp Lothar Mayring
- Written by: Philipp Lothar Mayring; Fritz Zeckendorf
- Produced by: Fritz Klotzsch
- Starring: Max Adalbert; Claire Rommer; Paul Wagner
- Cinematography: Alfred Hansen; Georg Muschner; Bernhard Wentzel
- Music by: Robert Gilbert
- Production company: UFA
- Distributed by: UFA
- Release date: 8 September 1931
- Running time: 78 minutes
- Country: Germany
- Language: German

The Battle of Bademunde (German: Die Schlacht von Bademünde) is a 1931 German comedy film directed by Philipp Lothar Mayring and starring Max Adalbert, Claire Rommer and Paul Wagner. It was one of a number of military comedies made during the late Weimar era. It was shot at the Babelsberg Studios in Berlin. The film's sets were designed by the art director Artur Günther. It was produced and distributed by UFA, Germany's largest film company of the era.

== Synopsis ==
In the small seaside spa town Bademunde a new mineral spring is about to be opened. The arrival of a contingent of sailors causes chaos as they clash with the local army garrison. The town official Knospe desperately tries to maintain order while his niece Susi flirts with the visiting officers.

== Cast ==
- Max Adalbert as Knospe - Gemeindediener
- Claire Rommer as Susi - seine Nichte
- Paul Wagner as Major
- Gerhard Bienert as Feldwebel
- Peter Wolff as Fähnrich
- Fritz Schulz as Franz - Infanterist
- Paul Heidemann as Karl - Infanterist
- Ernst Pröckl as Sanitätsgefreiter
- Fritz Alberti as Kapitän
- Kurt von Ruffin as Nordwigk - Leutnant zur See
- Erik Schütz as Obermaat
- Hermann Speelmans as Hannes
- Martin Jacob as Jochen
- Hans Wassmann as Bürgermeister
- Adele Sandrock as Vereinsvorsitzende
- Vicky Werckmeister as Frieda
- Hans Junkermann as P.L. Staudt
- Liselotte Schaak as Elli - seine Tochter
- Helga Karwa as Blumenmädchen
- Hilde Larsen as Blumenmädchen
- Liesl Otto as Blumenmädchen
- Dolly Raphael as Blumenmädchen
- Annemarie Sörensen as Blumenmädchen

== Bibliography ==
- Bock, Hans-Michael; Bergfelder, Tim, eds. (2009). The Concise Cinegraph: Encyclopaedia of German Cinema. New York: Berghahn Books. ISBN 978-1-57181-655-9.
- Jacobsen, Wolfgang. Babelsberg: das Filmstudio. Argon, 1994.
