= Helmuth Schönnenbeck =

German film editor and producer

- Born: 1902
- Died: 19 December 1973 (aged 70–71) near to Lake Starnberg, West Germany
- Occupations: Editor; Producer
- Years active: 1937-1943

Helmuth Schönnenbeck (1902-1973) was a German film editor and producer. He edited the 1941 film Goodbye, Franziska. He was married to Anneliese Schönnenbeck, who was also a film editor.

== Selected filmography ==
=== Editor ===
- Mystery About Beate (1938)
- Escape in the Dark (1939)
- Marriage in Small Doses (1939)
- Target in the Clouds (1939)
- Men Are That Way (1939)
- Hurrah! I'm a Father (1939)
- Goodbye, Franziska (1941)
- We Make Music (1942)
- His Son (1942)
- Front Theatre (1942)
- Sophienlund (1943)
- Quax in Africa (1947)

=== Producer ===
- And If We Should Meet Again (1947)
- Love on Ice (1950)
- Salto Mortale (1953)

=== Screenwriter ===
- Blocked Signals (1948)

== Bibliography ==
- Jacobsen, Wolfgang & Prinzler, Hans Helmut. Käutner. Spiess, 1992.
