= Feuerzangenbowle =

German alcoholic drink

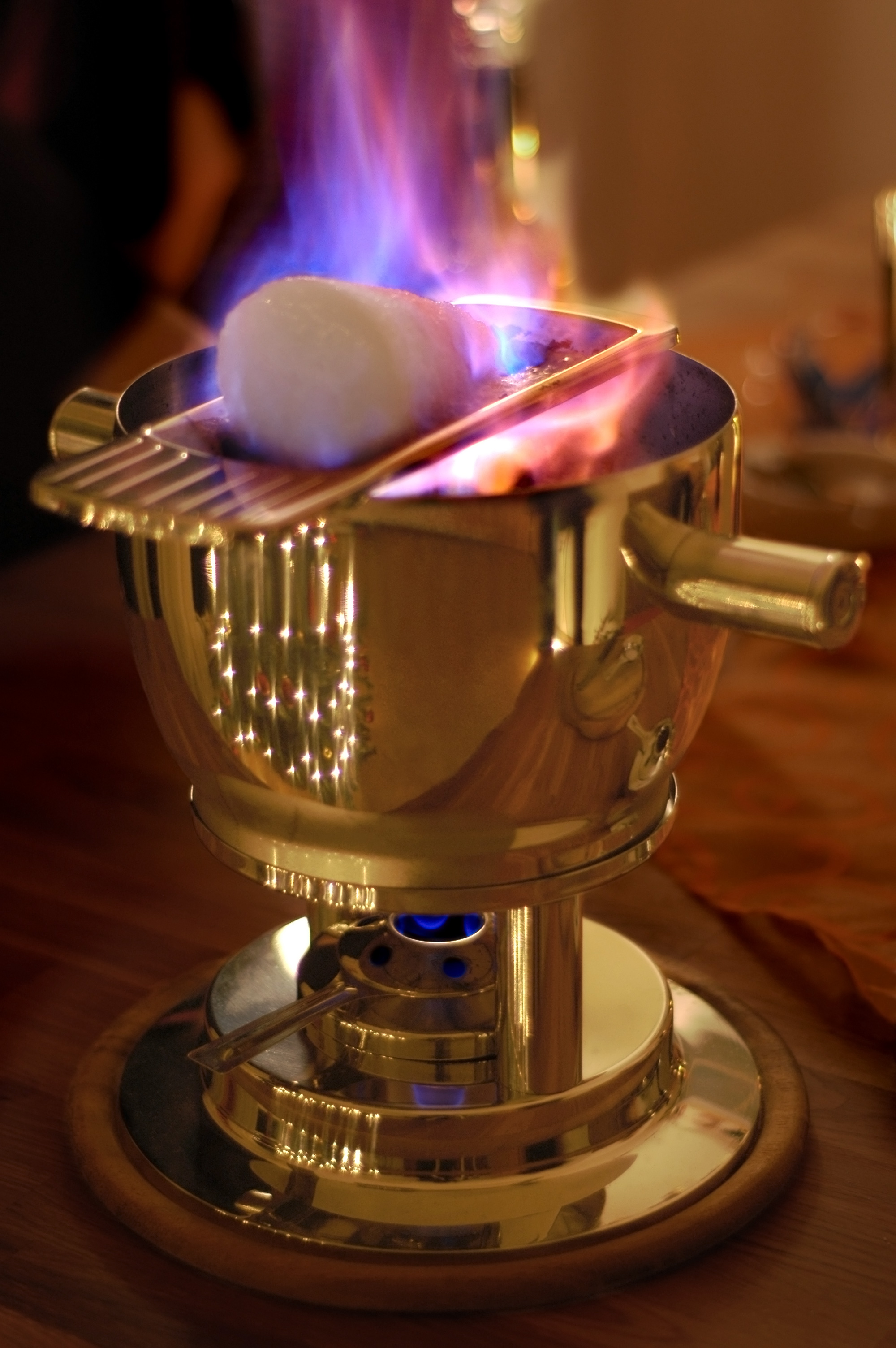
Feuerzangenbowle with the burning Zuckerhut

Feuerzangenbowle (German: [ˈfɔʏ̯ɐt͡saŋənˌboːlə]) is a traditional German alcoholic drink for which a rum-soaked sugarloaf is set on fire and drips into mulled wine. It is often part of a Christmas or New Year's Eve tradition. The name translates literally as fire-tongs punch, "Bowle" meaning "punch" being borrowed from English.

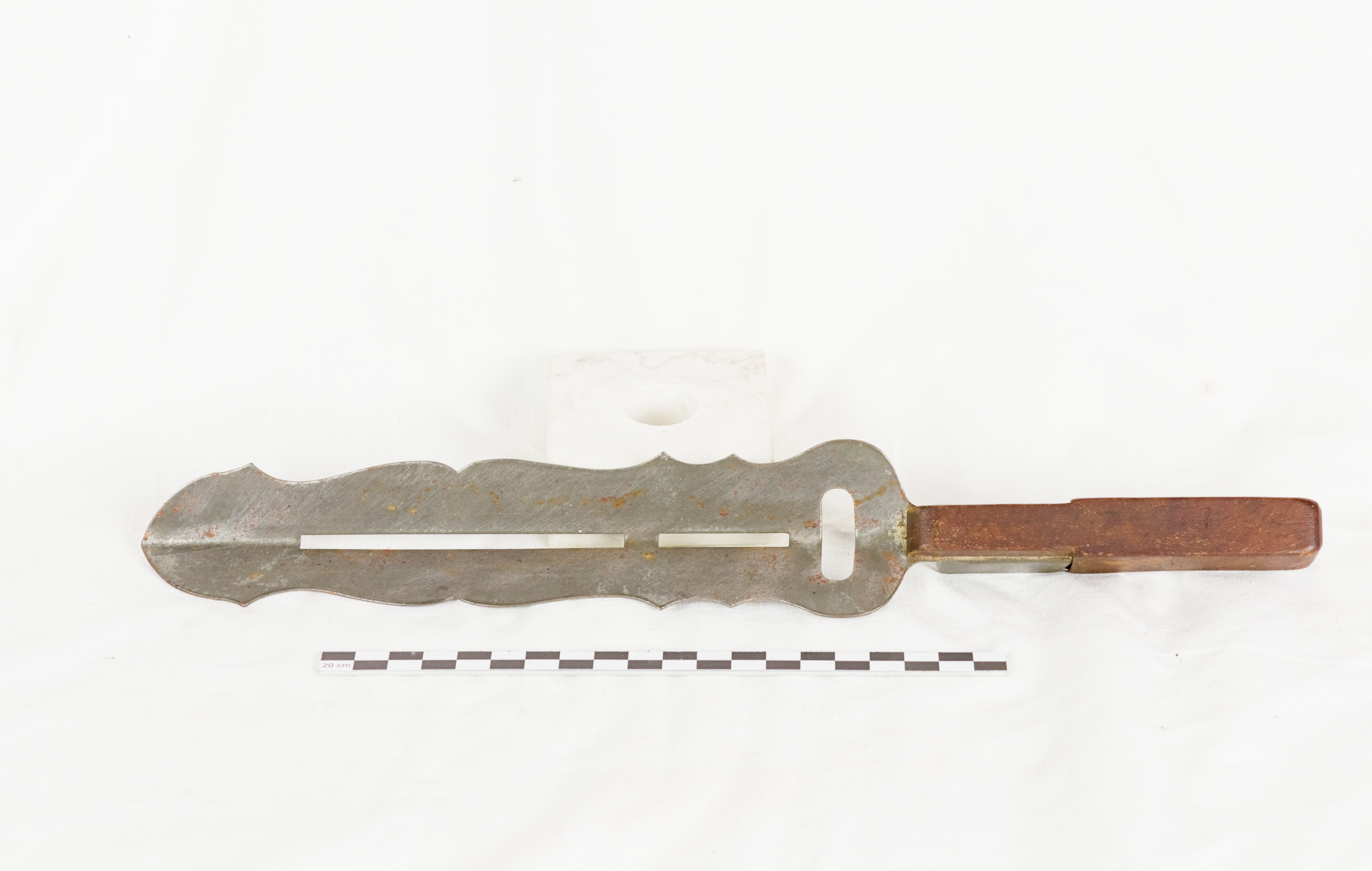
Metalic feuerzange, with wooden handle. The sugar soaked in rum is placed on the blade and set on fire. The melted sugar drops into the wine.

The popularity of the drink was boosted in Germany by the 1944 comedy film Die Feuerzangenbowle. It is a traditional drink of some German fraternities, who also call it Krambambuli, as the red color is reminiscent of a cherry liqueur of that name which was manufactured by the distillery Der Lachs zu Danzig (in Gdańsk).

== Procedure ==
Feuerzangenbowle is prepared in a bowl, similar to a fondue set, which usually is suspended over a small burner (Rechaud). The bowl is filled with heated dry red wine spiced with cinnamon sticks, cloves, star anise and orange peel, similar to mulled wine. The Feuerzange was originally a pair of tongs, but in modern design, it is common for a purpose-designed metal grate mounted on top of the bowl to hold the Zuckerhut (sugarloaf), a 250-gram (9 oz) lump of sugar. The sugar is soaked with rum and set alight, melting and caramelizing. The rum should have at least 54% alcohol by volume (ABV), such as the high-ABV Austrian rum Stroh 80, and be at room temperature in order to burn properly. More rum is poured with a ladle until all the sugar has melted and mixed with the wine. The resulting punch is served in mugs while the burner keeps the bowl warm. For some the ceremony is more important than the drink itself, celebrating the gathering of friends and conveying a notion of Gemütlichkeit.

== See also ==
- Flaming drink
