= Inge von Wangenheim =

German actress (1912–1993)

Ingeborg von Wangenheim
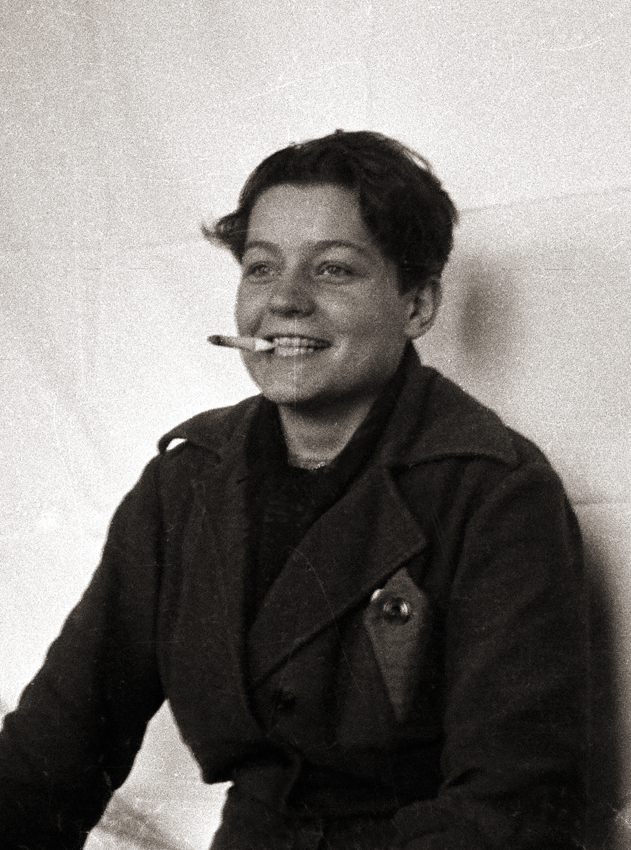
- Inge von Wangenheim during the 1930s in Moscow
- Born: Ingeborg Franke; 1 July 1912; Berlin, German Empire
- Died: 6 April 1993 (aged 80); Weimar, Thuringia, Germany
- Occupations: Actress writer
- Political party: KPD; SED
- Spouse: Gustav von Wangenheim (m. 1931; div. 1954)
- Children: 4, including Friedel

Ingeborg "Inge" von Wangenheim (née Franke; 1 July 1912 – 6 April 1993) was a German actress who married actor Gustav Von Wangenheim and joined the Communist Party. After the war, she became a successful East German writer.

She left a photographic archive from the years she spent living in Moscow during the 1930s and 40s when very few people had access to photographic equipment for both economic and political reasons.

== Life ==
=== Early years ===
Inge Franke was born into a working-class family in Berlin. Her mother was a garment worker. On leaving school she attended a drama academy, before taking a succession of minor acting roles at various theatres including that at the Schiffbauerdamm, also taking small parts in productions staged by Erwin Piscator. She joined the Communist Party (KPD) in 1930. In 1931 she joined "Truppe 1931", a newly formed theatre group created from the communist cell in the Berlin Artists' Colony. The originator and leader of "Truppe 1931" was an actor-impresario called Gustav von Wangenheim, whom Inge would later marry. Wangenheim had himself made a name as a silent film actor (his most remembered role would be as Thomas Hutter in Nosferatu, F. W. Murnau's 1922 adaptation of Dracula).

=== Exile ===
In January 1933 the Nazi Party took power and quickly set about creating a one party state. Membership of any party other than the Nazi party – and particularly of the Communist Party – became illegal. Ingeborg went into exile, initially to Belgium and France, then moving on with Gustav von Wangenheim to Moscow where, as she would later write, she arrived in a spirit of "naive enthusiasm". In Moscow she was able to work as a journalist and as an actress, joining the Moscow-based "German Theatre Crew of the Left" (Deutsche Theater Kolonne Links) in 1934. In 1937 Inge von Wangenheim took Soviet citizenship. On the stage her appearances included the starring role, alongside Bruno Schmidtsdorf, in the Moscow produced anti-fascist film, "Kämpfer" ("Fighters"), directed and scripted by her husband Gustav von Wangenheim.

When the German army invaded the Soviet Union von Wangenheim was evacuated, first to Kazan in the Russian east and later to Tashkent. During the period of the evacuation her younger son, Edi, died in Chistopol aged 8 months in 1941. She was able to return to Moscow in 1943, working as a contributing editor for the National Committee for a Free Germany (NKFD / Nationalkomitee Freies Deutschland) and for the eponymous German language radio broadcaster.

=== East Germany ===
In 1945 Inge von Wangenheim returned to what was left of Germany, settling in the Soviet occupation zone. This part of the country was being transformed into a separate Germany, the German Democratic Republic. In 1946 she became a member of the new country's newly formed ruling SED, which had been created through a contrived merger in East Germany of the old Communist and SPD parties. In the years that followed she became involved with the "Association of German People's Theatre" ("Bund Deutscher Volksbühnen"), working during 1947/48 as editor of the organisation's journal "Volksbühne". In addition, she resumed her theatre career, both as an actress and a producer. She appeared in the Deutsches Theater, which in 1945 was reopened by her husband, in East Berlin. She also undertook work for the East German state-owned film studio DEFA. She starred in the 1948 film "Und wieder 48" ("Another '48") which was scripted and directed by her husband, and which concerned itself with the revolutionary events of 1848, inevitably inviting comparisons with 1948.

Inge von Wangenheim: Some published works
- Die Aufgaben der Kunstschaffenden im neuen Deutschland, Berlin 1947
- Mein Haus Vaterland, Berlin 1950
- Zum 175. Todestag Konrad Ekhofs, Berlin 1953
- Auf weitem Feld, Berlin 1954
- Am Morgen ist der Tag ein Kind, Berlin 1957
- Einer Mutter Sohn, Berlin 1958
- Professor Hudebraach, Halle (Saale) 1961
- Das Zimmer mit den offenen Augen, Halle (Saale) 1965
- Die Geschichte und unsere Geschichten, Halle (Saale) 1966
- Reise ins Gestern, Halle 1967
- Die hypnotisierte Kellnerin, Rudolstadt 1968
- Kalkutta liegt nicht am Ganges, Rudolstadt 1970
- Die Verschwörung der Musen, Halle (Saale) 1971
- Die Probe, Halle (Saale) 1973
- Die tickende Bratpfanne, Rudolstadt 1974
- Von Zeit zu Zeit, Halle/Saale 1975
- Hamburgische Elegie, Halle (Saale) 1977
- Spaal, Rudolstadt 1979
- Die Entgleisung, Halle [u.a.] 1980
- Genosse Jemand und die Klassik, Halle [u.a.] 1982
- Mit Leib und Seele, Halle [u.a.] 1982
- Weiterbildung, Halle [u.a.] 1983
- Schauplätze, Rudolstadt 1983
- Station 5, Halle [u.a.] 1985
- Deutsch und Geschichte, Halle [u.a.] 1986
- Der goldene Turm, Rudolstadt 1988
- Auf Germanias Bärenfell, Bucha bei Jena 2002

From 1949 she worked, primarily, as a writer. Inge von Wangenheim was a member of the (East) German Writers' Association, and later a member of its executive committee.

=== Personal life ===
Gustav and Ingeborg von Wangenheim were divorced in 1960 after which Ingeborg moved to Rudolstadt in Thuringia and lived in a lesbian partnership. She and her partner moved again to nearby Weimar in 1974. Her daughter's family managed to emigrate to West Germany in 1982, but Ingeborg stayed in the German Democratic Republic till its end, and died in Weimar less than three years after the reunification.

== Writing ==
Inge von Wangenheim's literary output includes novels, memoirs, essays and travel books. She produced novels covering the creation and development phase of the German Democratic Republic, such as "Am Morgen ist der Tag ein Kind", an account of the uprising of 17 June 1953 from the perspective of The Party. Two other particularly noteworthy books are her memories of her time in Soviet exile, contained in "Mein Haus Vaterland" und "Auf weitem Feld". Both works are silent about the darker aspects of existence in Stalin's Russia.

In the 1960s von Wangenheim also started to pen reports about her travels in the west.

== Awards and honours ==
As media celebrities with strong anti-Nazi credentials, and in good standing with the East German authorities, Gustav and Inge von Wangenheim led a privileged existence. More than one commentator described them as "Communist nobility". The following list of Inge von Wangenheim's awards is not exhaustive:

- 1966 The Arts prize of the FDGB Trades Union Federation
- 1968 The Heinrich Heine Prize from the East German Ministry for Culture
- 1972 The Patriotic Order of Merit in Silver
- 1977 A National Prize of East Germany 2nd Class
- 1982 The Patriotic Order of Merit in Gold
- 1987 The Order of Karl Marx
- 1989 The Honorary doctorate from the Friedrich Schiller University at Jena

=== The Inge von Wangenheim literary institute ===
On 9 December 2010 a Literary Institute was founded at Rudolstadt, where she had once lived, and named after her. The institute has as its principal objectives:
(1) the regular award of a literary contribution to Humanism and Peace,
(2) to bring together the life's works of authors whose books were banned during the Nazi years, and make these available and
(3) to train and publish young authors.
