= Und wieder 48 =

1948 film

- Directed by: Gustav von Wangenheim
- Starring: Wilhelm Borchert
- Release date: November 4, 1948
- Country: East Germany
- Language: German

Und wieder 48 is an East German film. It was released in 1948.
