= Annemarie Sörensen =

German actress (1913–1993)

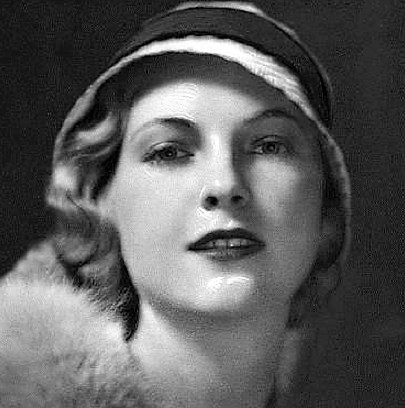
- Sörensen in 1934
- Born: 19 December 1913; Obergerlachsheim, Lower Silesia; German Empire
- Died: December 1993 (aged 79–80); Reading, Berkshire; United Kingdom
- Occupation: Actress
- Years active: 1931–1936 (film)

Annemarie Sörensen (19 December 1913 – December 1993) was a German singer and film actress. She played the female lead in the 1934 comedy Heinz in the Moon. She was a Protestant, but due to what was described as her uncertain racial origin she faced pressure following the Nazi takeover. In 1935 she emigrated from Germany and eventually went to live in Britain where she lived for the remainder of her life, although her attempt to break into British films failed.

== Selected filmography ==
- The Battle of Bademunde (1931)
- The Bartered Bride (1932)
- Heinz in the Moon (1934)
- Such a Rascal (1934)
- Shipwrecked Max (1936)

== Bibliography ==
- Goble, Alan. The Complete Index to Literary Sources in Film. Walter de Gruyter, 1999.
