= Rudolf Jugert =

German film director (1907–1979)

Rudolf Jugert (1907–1979) was a German film director.

== Selected filmography ==
- Film Without a Title (1948)
- Hallo, Fräulein! (1949)
- A Day Will Come (1950)
- Nights on the Road (1952)
- Illusion in a Minor Key (1952)
- Jonny Saves Nebrador (1953)
- Ein Herz spielt falsch (1953)
- The Great Test (1954)
- A Love Story (1954)
- Prisoners of Love (1954)
- Crown Prince Rudolph's Last Love (1955)
- Roses in Autumn (1955)
- Nina (1956)
- A Piece of Heaven (1957)
- Love Now, Pay Later (1959)
- The Scarlet Baroness (1959)
- Axel Munthe, The Doctor of San Michele (1962)
- Doctor Sibelius (1962)
- The River Line (1964)
- Hugenberg – Gegen die Republik (1967, TV film)
- Brückenallee Nr. 3 (1967, TV film)
- Berliner Blockade (1968, TV film)
- Der Reformator (1968, TV film)
- Das Wunder von Lengede (1969, TV film)
- Verratener Widerstand – Das Funkspiel der deutschen Abwehr in Holland (1969, TV film)
- Jacques Offenbach – Ein Lebensbild (1969, TV film)
- Unsere heile Welt (1972, TV series)
- Der Bastian (1973, TV series)
- Drei sind einer zuviel (1977, TV series)
- Unternehmen Rentnerkommune (1978–1979, TV series)
- Balthasar im Stau (1979, TV film)
