= Ernst Eckstein =

German humorist, novelist and poet (1845–1900)

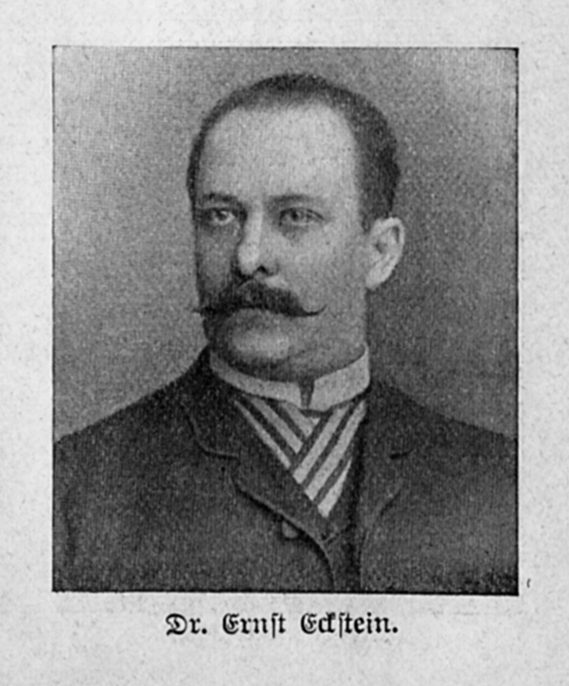
Ernst Eckstein.

Ernst Eckstein (6 February 1845, Giessen, Grand Duchy of Hesse –18 November 1900) was a German humorist, novelist and poet.

== Biography ==
From the university he went to Paris, where he completed his comic epos, Check to the Queen (1870), and wrote Paris Silhouettes (1873), the grotesque night-piece The Varzin Ghosts, and the Mute of Seville. Later he wrote the stories Margherita, At the Tomb of Cestius, The Mosque at Cordova. He was editor of a literary and critical journal, Hall of Poets, and of a humorous weekly, The Wag, at Leipzig, for some years, and in 1885 settled in Dresden. He also wrote The Claudii, Aphrodite, a Story of Ancient Hellas, Decius the Flute-player: a Merry Story of a Musician in Ancient Rome.

== Works ==
- Venus Urania, 1872
- Humoresken, 1875/82
- Beiträge zur Geschichte des Feuilletons, 1876
- Lisa Toscanella (Novellae), 1876
- Pariser Leben, 1876
- Ein Pessimist (Comedy), 1877
- Sturmnacht (Novellae), 1878
- Die Claudier (Novel), 1881
- Prusias. Roman aus dem letzten Jahrhundert der römischen Republik, 1884
- Jorinde (Novel), 1888
- Nero (Novel), 1889
- Das Kind (Novellae), 1893
- Verstehen wir Deutsch? Volkstümliche Sprachuntersuchungen, 1894
- Familie Hartwig (Novel), 1894
- Roderich Löhr (Novel), 1896
- Willibald Menz. Lavafluten (Novel), 1898
- Die Klosterschülerin (Novel), 1899
- Die Märchenprinzessin (Novel), 1901
- Gesammelte Schulhumoresken, 1907
