= Quax the Crash Pilot =

1941 film directed by Kurt Hoffmann

- Film poster
- Directed by: Kurt Hoffmann
- Written by: Hermann Grote (novel); Robert A. Stemmle
- Produced by: Heinz Rühmann
- Starring: Heinz Rühmann; Karin Himboldt; Lothar Firmans
- Cinematography: Heinz von Jaworsky
- Edited by: Walter Fredersdorf
- Music by: Werner Bochmann
- Production company: Terra Film
- Distributed by: Terra Film
- Release date: 16 December 1941
- Running time: 92 minutes
- Country: Germany
- Language: German

Quax the Crash Pilot (German: Quax, der Bruchpilot) is a 1941 German comedy film directed by Kurt Hoffmann and starring Heinz Rühmann, Karin Himboldt and Lothar Firmans. It is also sometimes translated as Quax the Test Pilot. It features the popular song "Homeland, Your Stars".

The film set in the 1930s before the outbreak of the Second World War. It is based on an aviation story by Hermann Grote about an everyday man who wins a newspaper competition that offers free flying lessons. Despite initial struggles, he gradually shows himself to be a good pilot.

Much of the film was shot on location in Bavaria. Interiors were shot at the Tempelhof and Babelsberg Studios in Berlin and the Bavaria Studios in Munich. It was followed by a sequel Quax in Africa which was also made during the Nazi era, but not released until 1947.

The film appears to have been popular with wartime Luftwaffe crews. Nightfighter pilot Wilhelm Johnen recalled it being shown at Venlo airfield on the evening of his unit's first operation over the Ruhr in late March 1942.

== Main cast ==
- Heinz Rühmann as Otto "Quax" Groschenbügel
- Karin Himboldt as Marianne Bredow
- Lothar Firmans as Hansen, Fluglehrer
- Harry Liedtke as Herr Bredow
- Elga Brink as Frau Bredow
- Hilde Sessak as Adelheid
- Leo Peukert as Bürgermeister
- Georg Vogelsang as Der alte Krehlert
- Beppo Brem as Knecht Alois
- Lutz Götz as Herr Busse
- Arthur Schröder as Flugarzt
- Franz Zimmermann as Harry Peters, Flugschüler
- Kunibert Gensichen as Walter Ottermann, Flugschüler
- Manfred Heidmann as Ludwig Mommsen, Flugschüler
- Guenther Markert as Gottfried Müller, Flugschüler
- José Held as Karl Bruhn, Flugschüler

== Bibliography ==
- Chapman, James (2008). War and Film. Reaktion Books. ISBN 978-1-86189-347-5.
- Hoffmann, Hilmar (1996). The Triumph of Propaganda: Film and National Socialism, 1933–1945. Translated by Broadwin, John; Berghahn, Volker R. Berghahn Books. ISBN 978-1-57181-122-6.
