= Aleksandr Geirot =

Russian actor and painter

- Born: Aleksandr Geirot; 1882
- Died: 1947 (aged 64–65)
- Occupations: Actor, painter
- Years active: 1914–1927

Aleksandr Geirot (Russian: Александр Гейрот) was a Soviet male actor and painter. Honored Artist of the RSFSR.

== Selected filmography ==
- 1916 — Dikaya sila
- 1925 — The Marriage of the Bear
- 1930 — St. Jorgen's Day
