= Heinrich Spoerl =

German author

- Born: Heinrich Christian Johann Spoerl; 8 February 1887; Düsseldorf, German Empire
- Died: 25 August 1955 (aged 68); Rottach-Egern, West Germany
- Occupations: Lawyer, Writer
- Known for: Humorous novels, the majority of which was later adapted for film

Heinrich Christian Johann Spoerl (German: [ˈhaɪnʁɪç ˈʃpœʁl]; 1887–1955) was a German author.

== Biography ==
Spoerl was born on 8 February 1887 in Düsseldorf, where he also grew up. He studied jurisprudence in Marburg, Berlin and Munich and was a solicitor in Düsseldorf from 1919 till 1937. He became a full-time writer in 1937 when he moved to Berlin, which he left in 1941 to move to Bavaria. He took up law again from 1945 till 1948. He died on 25 August 1955 in Rottach-Egern.

Spoerl wrote a number of humorous novels and comedies, most of which were made into films:

- Die Feuerzangenbowle, 1933
- Wenn wir alle Engel wären, 1936
- Der Maulkorb, 1936
- Der Gasmann, 1940
- Die Hochzeitsreise, 1946
- Die weisse Weste, 1946
