= List of West German films of 1950 =

List of films produced in Germany in 1950

A List of feature films distributed in Germany in 1950. This was the first full year of film production since the formal partition of Germany into East and West in 1949.

== A–L ==
Title	Director	Cast	Genre	Notes
Abundance of Life	Wolfgang Liebeneiner	Ingeborg Körner, Gunnar Möller, Fritz Kampers	Comedy	
The Allure of Danger	Eugen York	Angelika Hauff, Walter Richter, Berta Drews	Drama	
The Beautiful Galatea	Rolf Meyer	Hannelore Schroth, Viktor de Kowa, Willy Fritsch	Comedy	
Beloved Liar	Hans Schweikart	Elfie Mayerhofer, Hans Söhnker, Gustav Knuth	Romance	
The Black Forest Girl	Hans Deppe	Sonja Ziemann, Rudolf Prack, Paul Hörbiger	Musical comedy	
Blondes for Export	Eugen York	Lotte Koch, René Deltgen, Peter van Eyck	Crime	
Chased by the Devil	Viktor Tourjansky	Hans Albers, Willy Birgel, Lil Dagover	Crime	
Crown Jewels	Franz Cap	Sybille Schmitz, Hans Nielsen, Marina von Ditmar	Crime	
A Day Will Come	Rudolf Jugert	Dieter Borsche, Maria Schell, Lil Dagover	Drama	
The Disturbed Wedding Night	Helmut Weiss	Curd Jürgens, Ilse Werner, Susanne von Almassy	Comedy	
Doctor Praetorius	Karl Peter Gillmann	Curt Goetz, Valerie von Martens, Erich Ponto	Comedy drama	
Everything for the Company	Ferdinand Dörfler	Erhard Siedel, Lucie Englisch, Viktor Staal	Comedy	
The Falling Star	Harald Braun	Werner Krauss, Gisela Uhlen, Dieter Borsche	Drama	
Farewell Mister Grock	Pierre Billon	Grock, Suzy Prim, Charles Lemontier	Drama	Co-production with France
Five Suspects	Kurt Hoffmann	Hans Nielsen, Dorothea Wieck, Ina Halley	Crime	
Furioso	Johannes Meyer	Ewald Balser, Kirsten Heiberg, Peter van Eyck	Drama	
Gabriela	Géza von Cziffra	Zarah Leander, Carl Raddatz, Vera Molnar	Musical drama	
The Girl from the South Seas	Hans Müller	Angelika Hauff, Hardy Krüger, Albert Florath	Comedy	
The Goddess of Rio Beni	Franz Eichhorn	Angelika Hauff, Helmuth Schneider, José Ruzzo	Adventure	Co-production with Brazil
Good Fortune in Ohio	Heinz Paul	Hermann Brix, Edith Prager, Loni Heuser	Comedy	
Harbour Melody	Hans Müller	Kirsten Heiberg, Paul Henckels, Heinz Engelmann	Crime	
King for One Night	Paul May	Anton Walbrook, Willy Fritsch, Annelies Reinhold	Comedy	
Kissing Is No Sin	Hubert Marischka	Curd Jürgens, Elfie Mayerhofer, Erika von Thellmann	Comedy	Co-production with Austria
The Lie	Gustav Fröhlich	Sybille Schmitz, Cornell Borchers, Otto Gebühr	Crime	
Love on Ice	Kurt Meisel	Margot Hielscher, Hannelore Bollmann, Charlotte Witthauer	Romance	

== M–Z ==
Title	Director	Cast	Genre	Notes
The Man in Search of Himself	Géza von Cziffra	Vera Molnár, Wolf Albach-Retty, Paul Kemp	Comedy	
The Man Who Wanted to Live Twice	Viktor Tourjansky	Rudolf Forster, Olga Chekhova, Heidemarie Hatheyer	Drama	
Melody of Fate	Hans Schweikart	Brigitte Horney, Viktor de Kowa, Mathias Wieman	Drama	
My Niece Susanne	Wolfgang Liebeneiner	Hilde Krahl, Inge Meysel, Harald Paulsen	Comedy	
One Night Apart	Hans Deppe	Olga Chekhova, Sonja Ziemann, Kurt Seifert	Comedy	
Only One Night	Fritz Kirchhoff	Marianne Hoppe, Hans Söhnker, Willy Maertens	Drama	
The Orplid Mystery	Helmut Käutner	Horst Caspar, Bettina Moissi, Fritz Kortner	Thriller	
The Rabanser Case	Kurt Hoffmann	Hans Söhnker, Richard Häussler, Carola Höhn	Crime	
A Rare Lover	Alfred Braun	Susanne von Almassy, Irene von Meyendorff, Curd Jürgens	Romantic comedy	
Regimental Music	Arthur Maria Rabenalt	Heidemarie Hatheyer, Friedrich Domin, Siegfried Breuer	Drama	
The Reluctant Maharaja	Ákos Ráthonyi	Olga Tschechowa, Kurt Seifert, Sonja Ziemann	Comedy	
Royal Children	Helmut Käutner	Jenny Jugo, Peter van Eyck, Erika von Thellmann	Comedy	
Scandal at the Embassy	Erik Ode	Viktor de Kowa, Jeanette Schultze, Michiko Tanaka	Comedy	
Sensation in Savoy	Eduard von Borsody	Sybille Schmitz, Paul Klinger, Harald Paulsen	Comedy	
The Shadow of Herr Monitor	Eugen York	Carl Raddatz, Paul Dahlke, Marianne Wischmann	Crime	
Shadows in the Night	Eugen York	Hilde Krahl, Willy Fritsch, Carl Raddatz	Drama	
The Staircase	Alfred Braun, Wolfgang Staudte	Hilde Körber, Herbert Stass, Paul Westermeier	Drama	
Taxi-Kitty	Kurt Hoffmann	Hannelore Schroth, Carl Raddatz, Fita Benkhoff	Musical comedy	
Theodore the Goalkeeper	E. W. Emo	Theo Lingen, Hans Moser, Lucie Englisch	Comedy	Co-production with Austria
Third from the Right	Géza von Cziffra	Vera Molnár, Peter van Eyck, Marianne Wischmann	Crime musical	
Thirteen Under One Hat	Johannes Meyer	Inge Landgut, Volker von Collande, Ruth Leuwerik	Comedy	
This Man Belongs to Me	Paul Verhoeven	Winnie Markus, Gustav Fröhlich, Heidemarie Hatheyer	Comedy	
Three Girls Spinning	Carl Froelich	Albrecht Schoenhals, Adelheid Seeck, Axel von Ambesser	Comedy	
Tobias Knopp – Abenteuer eines Junggesellen	Gerhard Fieber, Wolfgang Liebeneiner		Animated	
Trouble in Paradise	Joe Stöckel	Olga Chekhova, Trude Hesterberg, Elfie Pertramer	Comedy	
Two in One Suit	Joe Stöckel	Wolf Albach-Retty, Olga Chekhova, Rudolf Reiff	Comedy	
Two Times Lotte	Josef von Báky	Antje Weisgerber, Peter Mosbacher, Isa Günther	Comedy	
Unknown Sender	Ákos Ráthonyi	Cornell Borchers, Henny Porten, Bruni Löbel	Comedy	
The Violin Maker of Mittenwald	Rudolf Schündler	Willy Rösner, Paul Richter, Erika von Thellmann	Drama	
Wedding Night In Paradise	Géza von Bolváry	Johannes Heesters, Claude Farell, Gretl Schörg	Musical	
Wedding with Erika	Eduard von Borsody	Marianne Schönauer, Wolfgang Lukschy, Dorit Kreysler	Musical	
When a Woman Loves	Wolfgang Liebeneiner	Hilde Krahl, Johannes Heesters, Mathias Wieman	Comedy	
When Men Cheat	Carl Boese	Grethe Weiser, Jeanette Schultze, Kurt Seifert	Comedy	
The White Hell of Pitz Palu	Rolf Hansen	Hans Albers, Liselotte Pulver, Adrian Hoven	Mountain film	
Who Drove the Grey Ford?	Otto Wernicke	Ursula Herking, Hilde Sessak, Wolfgang Neuss	Crime	
Who Is This That I Love?	Géza von Bolváry	Jester Naefe, Adrian Hoven, Iván Petrovich	Comedy	
The Woman from Last Night	Arthur Maria Rabenalt	Heli Finkenzeller, Albert Matterstock, Hilde Sessak	Comedy	

== Bibliography ==
- Davidson, John & Hake, Sabine. Framing the Fifties: Cinema in a Divided Germany. Berghahn Books, 2007.

== See also ==
- List of Austrian films of 1950
- List of East German films of 1950
