= Shadows in the Night (1950 film) =

1950 film directed by Eugen York

- Directed by: Eugen York
- Written by: Heinz Otto Jahn
- Produced by: Walter Koppel; Gyula Trebitsch
- Starring: Hilde Krahl; Willy Fritsch; Carl Raddatz
- Cinematography: Willy Winterstein
- Edited by: Alice Ludwig
- Music by: Wolfgang Zeller
- Production company: Real Film
- Release date: 10 January 1950
- Running time: 82 minutes
- Country: West Germany
- Language: German

Shadows in the Night (German: Schatten in der Nacht) is a 1950 West German drama film directed by Eugen York and starring Hilde Krahl, Willy Fritsch and Carl Raddatz. It was made at the Wandsbek Studios by the Hamburg-based Real Film. The film's sets were designed by the art director Herbert Kirchhoff.

== Synopsis ==
A happily married woman is blackmailed by a former lover.

== Cast ==
- Hilde Krahl as Elga
- Willy Fritsch as Ernst Magnus
- Carl Raddatz as Richard Struwe
- Josef Sieber as Mumme
- Hermann Schomberg as Edgar Elsberg
- Arnim Dahl as Freitag
- Carl-Heinz Schroth as Minjes
- Lilo Müller as Heidi
- Ursula Herking as Julia
- Thessy Kuhls as Margit
- Inge Meysel as Lisa
- Albert Florath as Kommissar
- Franz Schafheitlin
- Helmut Gmelin
- Änne Bruck
- Karl-Heinz Peters as Wirt
- Carl Voscherau

== Bibliography ==
- Bock, Hans-Michael & Bergfelder, Tim. The Concise CineGraph. Encyclopedia of German Cinema. Berghahn Books, 2009.
