= The Devil's General =

- Directed by: Helmut Käutner
- Written by: Gyula Trebitsch; Helmut Käutner; George Hurdalek
- Based on: play by Carl Zuckmayer
- Produced by: Walter Koppel; Richard Gordon
- Starring: Curd Jürgens; Marianne Koch; Viktor de Kowa; Karl John; Eva Ingeborg Scholz; Harry Meyen
- Cinematography: Albert Benitz
- Edited by: Klaus Dudenhöfer
- Production company: Real Film
- Distributed by: Europa-Filmverleih
- Release date: 23 February 1955
- Running time: 117 minutes
- Country: West Germany
- Language: German

The Devil's General (German: Des Teufels General) is a 1955 black and white West German film based on the play of the same title by Carl Zuckmayer. The film features Curd Jürgens as General Harras, Marianne Koch, Viktor de Kowa, Karl John, Eva Ingeborg Scholz, and Harry Meyen. It was shot at the Wandsbek Studios in Hamburg. The film's sets were designed by the art directors Albrecht Becker and Herbert Kirchhoff.

It was one of a number of films made in Germany in the 1950s that emphasized resistance to Hitler among German generals in World War Two. Others included Canaris, Children, Mother, and the General, and The Last Ten Days.

== Plot ==
Nazi Germany in 1941. The title character is Luftwaffe General Harras, a highly decorated World War I veteran contemptuous of the Third Reich and the World War II attempt to conquer Europe. Initially courted by SS officials, he continually mocks the Nazi leadership, which leads to friends turning into enemies and suspicion from SS and Gestapo of what may be treason.

He is temporarily arrested by order of Heinrich Himmler and, after his release, is determined to break his deal with the devil. He backs the sabotage action of his flight engineer, threatens an SS officer at gunpoint and finally crashes his aircraft into the control tower of his airbase.

== Cast ==
- Curd Jürgens as Harras, whose character is supposedly based upon German Luftwaffe General Ernst Udet
- Bum Krüger as Lüttjohann, Harras's adjutant.
- Paul Westermeier as Korrianke, Harras's chauffeur.
- Albert Lieven as Friedrich Eilers, Colonel & squadron leader.
- Harry Meyen as Hartmann, Luftwaffe officer.
- Hans Daniel as Hastenteuffel, Luftwaffe officer.
- Beppo Brem as Pfundtmayer, Luftwaffe officer.
- Karl Ludwig Diehl as Sigbert von Mohrungen, President of the Raw Materials Procurement Department.
- Werner Fuetterer as Baron Pflungk, Attaché in the Ministry of Foreign Affairs.
- Viktor de Kowa as Dr. Schmidt-Lausitz, Nazi Party official.
- Karl John as Oderbruch, engineer in the Ministry of Aviation.
- Erica Balqué as Anne Eilers, Friedrich Eilers' wife.
- Eva Ingeborg Scholz as Waltraut von Mohrungen, nicknamed Pützchen, Anne's sister.
- Camilla Spira as Olivia Geiss, diva.
- Marianne Koch as Diddo Geiss, Olivia's niece; love interest of General Harras, despite how much younger than him she is.
- Ingrid van Bergen as Lyra Schoeppke, named "die Tankstelle," which means "The Gas Station."
- Inge Meysel as Frau Korrianke.
- Joseph Offenbach as Zernick, SS-Hauptsturmführer.
- Wolfgang Neuss as police photographer.
- Robert Meyn as von Stetten, Generalleutnant.
- Werner Riepel as Kleinschmidt,, Göring's chauffeur.
- Werner Schumacher as SS-Wachtmeister.
- Wolfried Lier as Herr Detlev, restaurant waiter.

== Original play ==
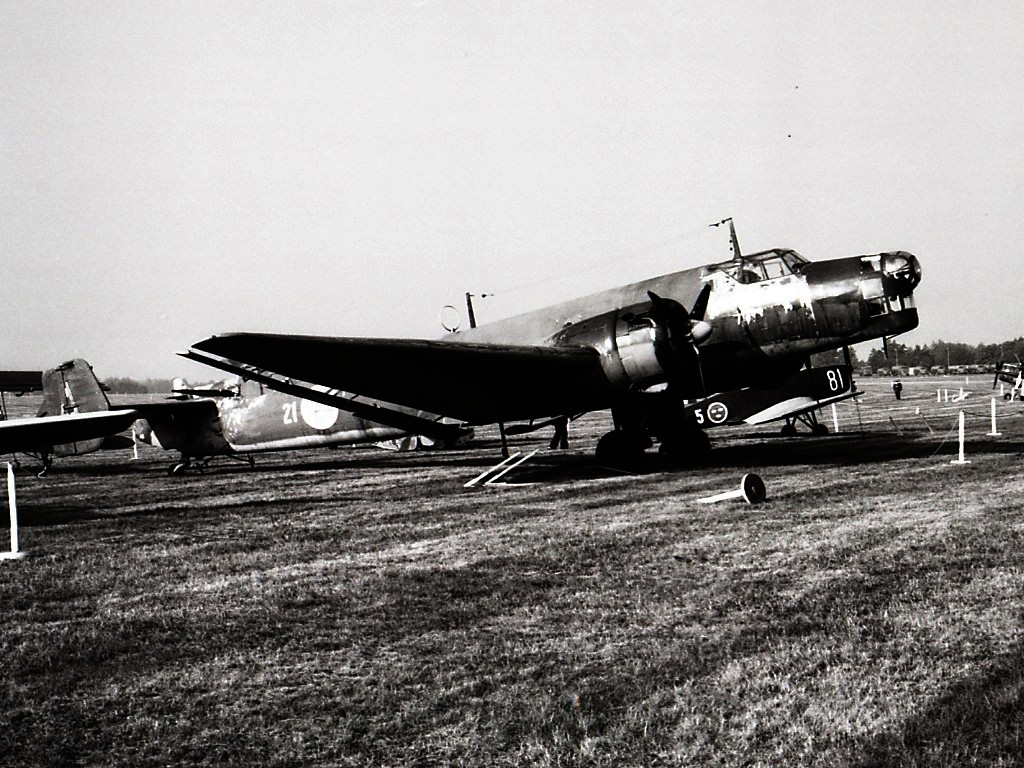
Swedish Ju 86 (1976)

The film was based on a play by Carl Zuckmayer who wrote it while in exile in the USA. In December, 1941, he read about the death of a personal friend, Ernst Udet, who was a World War One ace who later became an important figure within the Nazi-era Luftwaffe, but eventually grew disillusioned with the regime and committed suicide. Zuckmayer wrote the play after World War Two and it had its debut in Zurich in 1946 and in Frankfurt in 1947. The play was hugely popular in Germany and within a few years was the most frequently performed play in the country.

Trevor Howard starred in a production in England in 1953.

== Production ==
The film was shot in Hamburg and Berlin using Swedish-built Junkers Ju 86 bombers with license-built Bristol Mercury engines on a local airfield including its offices with Esselte Files on the shelf. The parking lot contains a post-war VW Bus. All uniforms were of a material and tailoring standard unknown in wartime Germany.

== Reception ==
The film was very successful at the box office in Germany. It was released in the US in 1958 and performed much better in that country than most German films at the time.

At the German Film Awards of 1955 Marianne Koch won the Film Award in Silver for Outstanding Individual Achievement: Supporting Actress for her performance in the film.

Reviewing the film Pauline Kael wrote "Though the film is a melodrama of conscience, it derives much of its impact from the sexual assurance of Curt Jurgens in the leading role. Helmut Kautner’s direction is not imaginative, but for a solid story, well-told, about characters and obstacles, it doesn’t need to be: the film has the necessary pulse and excitement."

== Bibliography ==
- Ott, Frederick W (1986). The great German films.
