= Second Hand Destiny =

1949 film

- Directed by: Wolfgang Staudte
- Written by: Wolfgang Staudte
- Produced by: Walter Koppel; Gyula Trebitsch
- Starring: Erich Ponto; Heinz Klevenow; Marianne Hoppe
- Cinematography: Willy Winterstein
- Edited by: Alice Ludwig
- Music by: Wolfgang Zeller
- Production company: Real Film
- Distributed by: Herzog Film
- Release date: 6 October 1949
- Running time: 110 minutes
- Country: West Germany
- Language: German

Second Hand Destiny (German: Schicksal aus zweiter Hand) is a 1949 West German drama film directed by Wolfgang Staudte and starring Erich Ponto, Heinz Klevenow and Marianne Hoppe. It is sometimes considered a film noir. At the time the director Staudte was mostly known for his work for the East German studio DEFA.

It was made between May and July 1949 at the Wandsbek Studios of the Hamburg-based company Real Film. The film's sets were designed by the art directors Albrecht Becker and Herbert Kirchhoff.

== Synopsis ==
A man now working as a clairvoyant narrates in flashback how he has sunk from once being a happily married man to committing uxoricide.

== Main cast ==
- Erich Ponto as Professor Sapis
- Heinz Klevenow as Lawyer Dr. van Hooven
- Marianne Hoppe as Irene Scholz
- Wilhelm Borchert as Michael Scholz / Sylvio Sylvestro
- Ernst Waldow as Studienrat Gärtner
- Albert Florath as Studienrat 'Pinguin'
- Joseph Offenbach as Ausrufer
- Horst von Otto as Ulrich Carstens
- Willy A. Kleinau as Ebeling
- Oskar Dimroth as Senator Delius
- Änne Bruck as Frau Delius
- Adalbert Kriwat as Sanitätsrat Lehfeld
- Heinz Klingenberg as Dr. Beringe
- Edith Heerdegen as Hermine Bruns
- Carl Voscherau as Heinemann
- Friedl Rostock as Ruth
- Gustl Busch as Kartenlegerin
- Renate Schacht as Medium
- Rupert Glawitsch as Tenor Stransky
- Ulrich Erfurth as Agent

== Bibliography ==
- Spicer, Andrew (2010). Historical Dictionary of Film Noir. Scarecrow Press. ISBN 978-0-8108-7378-0.
