= The Last Night (1949 film) =

1949 film directed by Eugen York

- Directed by: Eugen York
- Written by: Friedrich Hartau (play); Otto-Heinz Jahn; Harald G. Petersson
- Produced by: Walter Koppel; Gyula Trebitsch
- Starring: Sybille Schmitz; Karl John; Margarete Haagen
- Cinematography: Willy Winterstein
- Edited by: Alice Ludwig
- Music by: Wolfgang Zeller
- Production company: Real Film
- Distributed by: Herzog Film
- Release date: 11 February 1949
- Running time: 93 minutes
- Country: Germany
- Language: German

The Last Night (German: Die letzte Nacht) is a 1949 German drama film directed by Eugen York and starring Sybille Schmitz, Karl John, Margarete Haagen. It was made by the Hamburg-based company Real Film at the Wandsbek Studios. The film's sets were designed by Herbert Kirchhoff. It was not a box office success on its release.

== Synopsis ==
In German-occupied France in 1944, a female resistance operative and a German army officer fall in love.

== Cast ==
- Sybille Schmitz as Renée Meurier
- Karl John as Harald Buchner, Oberleutnant
- Margarete Haagen as Lisa Plessow
- Catja Görna as Marina Eilers, Sängerin
- Carl-Heinz Schroth as André Meurier, Renées Bruder
- Peter Mosbacher as Major Brink, I.A.
- Hermann Schomberg as General Riedel, Divisionsgeneral
- Joseph Offenbach as Hauptmann Klapproth, NSFO-Offizier
- Josef Sieber as Hauptfeldwebel Mahnke
- Hans Richter as Willem, Ordonnanz
- Franz Schafheitlin as Kriegsgerichtsrat Börner
- Peter Schütte as Hauptmann Venor, Sonderführer und Dolmetscher
- Josef Dahmen as Rostard, Kellner
- Ludwig Röger as Maurice
- Horst von Otto as Stabsintendant Wegler
- Willi Schweisguth as Violle, Gärtner im Schloß Ampière
- Erwin Geschonneck as Oskar, Fahrer
- Wolgang Heßler as Major Olbrecht, Nachrichtenoffizier
- Hans Harlow as Dr. Dörfel, Oberfeldarzt
- Ruth Peter
- Margar Massberg
- Sylvia Fitzen
- Maria Schell
- Ingrid Preusser
- Bruno Klockmann
- Ekkehard von Eckhardt
- Adalbert Kriwat

== Bibliography ==
- Bock, Hans-Michael; Bergfelder, Tim, eds. (2009). The Concise Cinegraph: Encyclopaedia of German Cinema. New York: Berghahn Books. ISBN 978-1-57181-655-9.
