= Restless Night (film) =

1958 film

- Directed by: Falk Harnack
- Written by: Horst Budjuhn; Albrecht Goes (story)
- Produced by: Hans Abich; Walter Koppel; Günther Stapenhorst; Gyula Trebitsch
- Starring: Bernhard Wicki; Ulla Jacobsson; Hansjörg Felmy
- Cinematography: Friedl Behn-Grund
- Edited by: Georg Jaun; Eva Kroll
- Music by: Hans-Martin Majewski
- Production companies: Carlton-Film; Filmaufbau; Real Film
- Distributed by: Europa-Filmverleih
- Release date: 30 October 1958
- Running time: 95 minutes
- Country: West Germany
- Language: German

Restless Night (German: Unruhige Nacht) is a 1958 West German war drama film directed by Falk Harnack and starring Bernhard Wicki, Ulla Jacobsson and Hansjörg Felmy. It is set on the Eastern Front during the Second World War. It was partly shot at the Wandsbek Studios in Hamburg. The film's sets were designed by the art directors Franz Bi and Bruno Monden.

== Cast ==
- Bernhard Wicki as Priest Brunner
- Ulla Jacobsson as Melanie
- Hansjörg Felmy as Fedor Baranowski
- Anneli Sauli as Ljuba
- Erik Schumann as Hauptmann von Arnim
- Werner Hinz as Oberleutnant Ernst
- Richard Münch as Kriegsgerichtsrat
- Werner Peters as Major Kartuschke
- Paul Esser as Zahlmeister
- Willem Holsboer
- Joseph Offenbach as Untersuchungsrichter
- Emmerich Schrenk
- Benno Gellenbeck
- Werner Völger
- Wolfgang Gruner
- Erik von Loewis
- Albert Bessler
- Otto Friebel
- Manfred Meurer

== See also ==
- Arrow to the Heart (TV play, 1952)

== Bibliography ==
- Parish, Robert. Film Actors Guide. Scarecrow Press, 1977.
