= Secrets of the City =

1955 film

- Directed by: Fritz Kortner
- Written by: Curt J. Braun; Fritz Kortner
- Produced by: Walter Koppel; Gyula Trebitsch
- Starring: Annemarie Düringer; Erich Schellow; Walther Süssenguth
- Cinematography: Albert Benitz
- Edited by: Klaus Dudenhöfer
- Music by: Michael Jary
- Production company: Real Film
- Distributed by: Europa-Filmverleih
- Release date: 4 January 1955
- Running time: 88 minutes
- Country: West Germany
- Language: German

Secrets of the City (German: Die Stadt ist voller Geheimnisse) is a 1955 West German drama film directed by Fritz Kortner and starring Annemarie Düringer, Erich Schellow and Walther Süssenguth. It was shot at the Wandsbek Studios in Hamburg. The film's sets were designed by the art directors Dieter Bartels and Herbert Kirchhoff.

== Cast ==
- Annemarie Düringer as Annie Lauer
- Erich Schellow as Rudolf Thomas, Engineer
- Walther Süssenguth as Böhnke
- Margot Trooger as Paula
- Paul Hörbiger as Herbert Klein
- Eva Ingeborg Scholz as Christl Lauer, Telephone Operator
- Bruni Löbel as Susi Ecker
- Adrian Hoven as Gerhard Scholz
- Grethe Weiser as Frieda Binder
- Karl Ludwig Diehl as Prof. Siebrecht
- Lucie Mannheim as Karina
- Werner Fuetterer as Dr. Gunther
- Carl-Heinz Schroth
- Charles Regnier as Morton
- Wilfried Seyferth as Ein Fremder
- Georg Thomalla as Paul Martinek
- Rudolf Vogel as Barkeeper

== Bibliography ==
- Bock, Hans-Michael & Bergfelder, Tim. The Concise CineGraph. Encyclopedia of German Cinema. Berghahn Books, 2009.
