= Gabriela (1950 film) =

1950 film

- German film poster
- Directed by: Géza von Cziffra
- Written by: Géza von Cziffra; Rudolf Köller; Kurt Schwabach
- Produced by: Walter Koppel; Gyula Trebitsch
- Starring: Zarah Leander; Carl Raddatz; Vera Molnar; Grethe Weiser
- Cinematography: Willy Winterstein
- Edited by: Alice Ludwig
- Music by: Michael Jary
- Production company: Real Film
- Distributed by: Allianz Filmverleih
- Release date: 6 April 1950
- Running time: 95 minutes
- Country: West Germany
- Language: German

Gabriela is a 1950 West German musical drama film directed by Géza von Cziffra and starring Zarah Leander, Carl Raddatz, and Vera Molnar. It was Leander's comeback film after a seven-year absence from filmmaking. In 1943 when the Nazi leadership had demanded she take German citizenship, she had broken her contract with UFA and returned to her native Sweden. In the immediate post-war era she was banned from appearing in German films because of her previous association with the Nazi hierarchy. When the law was lifted in 1949, she was able to make films once more.

It was shot at the Wandsbek Studios in Hamburg. The film's sets were designed by the art director Herbert Kirchhoff.

It was the third highest-grossing film at the West German box office in 1950.

== Plot ==
Gabriela is a famous singer who became renowned following the performance in a bar, where a man fell in love with her. After marriage to Charlie, Gabriella gave birth to Andrea, and subsequently to Hansi. However, she was forced to leave the two with her spouse in order to continue her singing career. The daughters, who are now adults, were raised by a foster mother, while Charlie was busy with work and had no time for them. Gabriela, who has matured over time, realizes the mistake she made when she gave the daughters away and is overwhelmed by maternal remorse. However, it's too late now.

Andrea, the oldest of them, is totally estranged from her mother and shows no interest in meeting her. Instead, Andrea is being courted by a young engineer. Meanwhile, Gabriela, with the help of her other daughter, Hansi, finally understands that the glamorous life she had as a singer was worth nothing compared to the lost trust of her daughter. But Andrea also makes it clear to Gabriela that she no longer needs her.

== Cast ==
- Zarah Leander as Gabriela
- Carl Raddatz as Charlie Braatz
- Vera Molnar as Andrea
- Grethe Weiser as Hansi
- Käthe Haack as Frau Matthes
- Gunnar Möller as Peter Hoyer
- Siegfried Breuer as Thomas Lorenzen
- Albert Florath as Uncle Hansen
- Kurt Meister as Portier Wuttke
- Marina Ried as Margot
- Arno Assmann as Freddy Lambert
- Ute Sielisch as Liane
- Franz Schafheitlin as Hausherr
- Adalbert Kriwat as taxi driver
- Gert Kobbel as second taxi driver
- Luise Bethke-Zitzman as Frida
- Waldo Favre as himself
- Hans Friedrich as Lorenzen's secretary
- Das Gabriela-Ballett as Ballet
- Das Gellert-Quintett as Quintet
- Dagmar Glombig as little Andrea
- Detlev Lais as Detlev Lais Dance Orchestra
- Ernst Rottluff as Lorenzen's assistant
