= Not Afraid of Big Animals =

1953 film

- Directed by: Ulrich Erfurth
- Written by: Karl Noti; Louis Agotay; Just Scheu; Ernst Nebhut
- Produced by: Walter Koppel; Gyula Trebitsch
- Starring: Heinz Rühmann; Ingeborg Körner; Gustav Knuth
- Cinematography: Albert Benitz
- Edited by: Hermann Leitner
- Music by: Michael Jary
- Production company: Real Film
- Distributed by: Deutsche London Film
- Release date: 31 July 1953
- Running time: 85 minutes
- Country: West Germany
- Language: German

Not Afraid of Big Animals (German: Keine Angst vor großen Tieren) is a 1953 West German comedy film directed by Ulrich Erfurth and starring Heinz Rühmann, Ingeborg Körner and Gustav Knuth. It is a circus film and a remake of the French film Le Dompteur (1938). It was shot at the Wandsbek Studios of Real Film in Hamburg. The film's sets were designed by the art directors Albrecht Becker and Herbert Kirchhoff.

== Main cast ==
- Heinz Rühmann as Emil Keller
- Ingeborg Körner as Anni
- Gustav Knuth as Schimmel
- Maria Paudler as Frau Müller
- Gisela Trowe as Emma
- Werner Fuetterer as Bollmann
- Jakob Tiedtke as Zirkusdirektor
- Erich Ponto as Polizeikommissar
- Josef Sieber as Polizist
- Willy Maertens as Lawyer Immelmann
- Albert Florath as Ziegler
- Margarete Slezak as Frau Richter
- Ursula Herking as Dame in Straßenbahn
- Hubert von Meyerinck as Kunstreiter
- Bruno Fritz as Herr Richter
- Beppo Brem as Schornsteinfeger / Chimney sweeper
- Carl Napp as Herr mit Koffer
- Wolfgang Neuss as Zauberkünstler
- Carl Voscherau as Mann in Straßenbahn
- Josef Dahmen as Schwerer Junge
- Ruth Stephan as Partnerin des Zauberkünstlers
- Max Schmeling as Zuschauer

== Bibliography ==
- Bock, Hans-Michael & Bergfelder, Tim. The Concise Cinegraph: Encyclopaedia of German Cinema. Berghahn Books, 2009.
