= Thirteen Old Donkeys =

1958 film

- Directed by: Hans Deppe
- Written by: Ursula Bruns; Janne Furch
- Produced by: Gyula Trebitsch; Walter Koppel
- Starring: Hans Albers; Marianne Hoppe
- Cinematography: Ekkehard Kyrath
- Edited by: Alice Ludwig
- Music by: Martin Böttcher
- Production company: Real Film
- Distributed by: Neue Filmverleih
- Release date: 31 October 1958
- Running time: 97 minutes
- Country: West Germany
- Language: German

Thirteen Old Donkeys (German: 13 kleine Esel und der Sonnenhof) is a 1958 West German comedy film directed by Hans Deppe and starring Hans Albers, Marianne Hoppe and Karin Dor. It was one of the final performances of the veteran star Albers. It was made at the Wandsbek Studios by the Hamburg-based Real Film. The film's sets were designed by the art directors Mathias Matthies and Ellen Schmidt.

== Cast ==
- Hans Albers as Josef Krapp
- Marianne Hoppe as Martha Krapp
- Karin Dor as Monika
- Gunnar Möller as Walter
- Günther Lüders as Pastor
- Werner Peters as Oberlehrer Kasten
- Joseph Offenbach as Bennekamp
- Robert Meyn as Ess
- Josef Dahmen as Dr.Köster
- Erna Sellmer as Steinberger
- Ursula Wolff as Änne - Kind
- Isabelle Carlson as Franziska - Kind
- Peter Badura as Leo, Kind
- Rainer Ehrhardt as Andreas, Kind
- Hans Fitze as Bürgermeister
- Jost Ludwig as Moritz, Zwilling - Kind
- Lutz Ludwig as Max, Zwilling - Kind
- Sabine Schmiedel as Malwinchen - Kind
- Peter Uwe Witt as Hubert - Kind

== Bibliography ==
- Bock, Hans-Michael & Bergfelder, Tim. The Concise CineGraph. Encyclopedia of German Cinema. Berghahn Books, 2009.
