= Harbour Melody =

1950 film

- Directed by: Hans Müller
- Written by: Artur A. Kuhnert
- Produced by: Walter Koppel
- Starring: Kirsten Heiberg; Paul Henckels; Catja Görna
- Cinematography: Willy Winterstein
- Edited by: Alice Ludwig
- Music by: Franz Grothe
- Production company: Real Film
- Distributed by: Herzog-Filmverleih
- Release date: 20 January 1950
- Running time: 95 minutes
- Country: West Germany
- Language: German

Harbour Melody (German: Hafenmelodie) is a 1950 West German crime film directed by Hans Müller and starring Kirsten Heiberg, Paul Henckels and Catja Görna. It is part of a group of postwar German film noirs.

== Plot ==
A gang of criminals plan a warehouse heist.

It was shot at the Wandsbek Studios in Hamburg. The film's sets were designed by the art director Herbert Kirchhoff.

== Cast ==
- Kirsten Heiberg as Marietta
- Paul Henckels as Jansen
- Catja Görna as Inge Jansen
- Heinz Engelmann as Heinrich Osthaus
- Wolfgang Lukschy as Klaas Jansen
- Josef Sieber as Freddersen
- Arno Assmann as Bulli
- Peter Mosbacher as Jan
- Joseph Offenbach as Bruno
- Erwin Geschonneck as Emil
- Ruth Lommel as Kesses Mädchen
- Franz Schafheitlin as Arzt
- Josef Dahmen as Barmixer
- Karl-Heinz Peters as Musiker
- Arnold Risch as Polizist

== Bibliography ==
- Spicer, Andrew. Historical Dictionary of Film Noir. Scarecrow Press, 2010.
