= The Night Before the Premiere =

1959 film

- German film poster
- German: Die Nacht vor der Premiere
- Directed by: Georg Jacoby
- Written by: Helmuth M. Backhaus; Hans Bradtke; Answald Krüger; Maria Matray; Adolf Schütz
- Produced by: Gyula Trebitsch
- Starring: Marika Rökk; Theo Lingen; Wolfgang Lukschy
- Cinematography: Willy Winterstein
- Edited by: Alice Ludwig
- Music by: Lotar Olias; Helmut Zacharias
- Production company: Real Film
- Release date: 14 May 1959
- Running time: 99 minutes
- Country: West Germany
- Language: German

The Night Before the Premiere (German: Die Nacht vor der Premiere) is a 1959 West German musical comedy film directed by Georg Jacoby and starring Marika Rökk, Theo Lingen and Wolfgang Lukschy.

It was made by Real Film at the Wandsbek Studios in Hamburg.

== Cast ==
- Marika Rökk as Carola Lorm
- Theo Lingen as Karl Schmitt
- Wolfgang Lukschy as Kriminalkommissar Peter Hall
- Peer Schmidt as Heinz Schmitt
- Ursula Grabley as Berta Schmitt
- Erna Sellmer as Rosalia Fascinelli
- Wiebke Paritz as Barbara Lorm
- Fred Raul as Don Alvarez
- Wolfgang Neuss as Gavrilo
- Carl Voscherau as Friedrich Iversen
- Elly Burgmer
- Ruth von Hagen
- Max Walter Sieg
- Benno Gellenbeck
- Oscar Müller
- Lothar Grützner
- Joachim Rake
- Peter Frank
- Manfred Steffen as Joe
- Michael Toost
- Rudolf Fenner as Wirt der Arizona-Bar
- Bruno Vahl-Berg
- Uwe Friedrichsen as policeman
- Gerda-Maria Jürgens
- Louis Armstrong as himself
- Danny Barcelona as himself (drums)
- Peanuts Hucko as himself (clarinet)
- Billy Kyle as himself (piano)
- James Young as himself (trombone)
- Mort Herbert as himself (bass)
- Billy Mo as himself
- Helmut Zacharias as himself
