= The Heart of St. Pauli =

1957 film directed by Eugen York

- Directed by: Eugen York
- Written by: Eberhard von Wiese (novel); Kurt E. Walter
- Produced by: Walter Koppel; Heinz-Günter Sass; Gyula Trebitsch
- Starring: Hans Albers; Hansjörg Felmy; Jürgen Wilke; Carla Hagen
- Cinematography: Ekkehard Kyrath
- Edited by: Alexandra Anatra; Alice Ludwig
- Music by: Michael Jary
- Production company: Real-Film
- Distributed by: Europa Films
- Release date: 20 December 1957
- Running time: 95 minutes
- Country: West Germany
- Language: German

The Heart of St. Pauli (German: Das Herz von St. Pauli) is a 1957 West German musical film directed by Eugen York and starring Hans Albers, Hansjörg Felmy and Jürgen Wilke. The film is set in the St. Pauli district of Hamburg and was an attempt to capitalise on the success of Albers’ earlier starring role in Große Freiheit Nr. 7. It was made by the Hamburg-based studio Real Film and shot at the Wandsbek Studios and on location in the city. The film's sets were designed by the art directors Mathias Matthies and Ellen Schmidt.

== Cast ==
- Hans Albers as Käpt'n Jonny Jensen
- Hansjörg Felmy as Hein Jensen
- Jürgen Wilke as Hauptwachtmeister Fiete Jensen
- Carla Hagen as Tine Jensen
- Camilla Spira as Trudchen Meyer
- Gert Fröbe as Jabowski
- Werner Peters as Tanne
- Ernst Waldow as Karl Otto Pingel
- Elly Burgmer as Frau Pingel
- Peer Schmidt as Harry Pingel
- Karin Faber as Helga, Jonny Schwiegertochter in spe
- Mady Rahl as Mia, Freundin von Jabowski
- Hans Richter as Moses, Kellner bei Jonny
- Erich Dunskus as Kommissar Krüger
- Karin Baal as Janette, eine Tänzerin
- Olga Limburg as Mathilde
- Ludwig Linkmann as Täto-Willi
- Gerti Daub as Miss Germany 1957
- Carl Voscherau as Barkassenführer Hugo
- Josef Dahmen as Polizeibeamter
- Hans Paetsch as Käpt'n Martens
- Erna Sellmer as Tante Mathilde
- Werner Schumacher as Seemann
- Friedrich Schütter as Seemann

== Bibliography ==
- Hake, Sabine. Popular Cinema of the Third Reich. University of Texas Press, 2001.
