= At the Green Cockatoo by Night =

1957 film

- German film poster
- German: Nachts im grünen Kakadu
- Directed by: Georg Jacoby
- Written by: Helmuth M. Backhaus; Curt J. Braun; Wilhelm Jacoby; Artur Lippschuetz
- Produced by: Gyula Trebitsch
- Starring: Marika Rökk; Dieter Borsche; Renate Ewert
- Cinematography: Willy Winterstein
- Edited by: Klaus Dudenhöfer
- Music by: Michael Jary
- Production company: Real Film
- Distributed by: Europa-Filmverleih
- Release date: 29 November 1957
- Running time: 97 minutes
- Country: West Germany
- Language: German

At the Green Cockatoo by Night (German: Nachts im grünen Kakadu) is a 1957 West German musical film directed by Georg Jacoby and starring Marika Rökk, Dieter Borsche and Renate Ewert.

It was made by Real Film at the Wandsbek Studios in Hamburg.

== Cast ==
- Marika Rökk as Irene Wagner
- Dieter Borsche as Dr. Maybach
- Renate Ewert as Hilde Wagner
- Gunnar Möller as Knut Peters
- Hans Nielsen as Eduard Reichmann
- Loni Heuser as Tante Henriette
- Willy Maertens as Onkel Otto
- Trude Hesterberg as Frl. Koldewey
- Fred Raul as Haase
- Ludwig Linkmann as Prof. Hagedorn
- Joseph Offenbach as Balduin
- Christa Williams as singer
- Frank Forster as singer
- Helmut Ketels as dancer
- Claus Christofolini as dancer
- Heinz Holl as dancer
