= Dangerous Guests =

1949 film

- Directed by: Géza von Cziffra
- Written by: Géza von Cziffra
- Produced by: Walter Koppel
- Starring: Wolf Albach-Retty; Vera Molnar; Paul Kemp
- Cinematography: Ekkehard Kyrath
- Edited by: Klaus Dudenhöfer
- Music by: Michael Jary
- Production company: Real Film
- Distributed by: Allianz Filmverleih
- Release date: 25 December 1949
- Running time: 90 minutes
- Country: West Germany
- Language: German

Dangerous Guests (German: Gefährliche Gäste) is a 1949 West German comedy film directed by Géza von Cziffra and starring Wolf Albach-Retty, Vera Molnar and Paul Kemp. It was made at the Wandsbek Studios of the Hamburg-based Real Film. The film's sets were designed by the art director Mathias Matthies. It was remade by von Cziffra in 1960 as the Austrian film Crime Tango.

== Synopsis ==
Peter Anders has run out of money and is forced to put his villa up for sale. Three crooks move in, posing as employees of Peter, and set about their plan to sell the property for their own profit. However, the estate manager Amadeus and his daughter Inge are suspicious of these unexpected guests.

== Main cast ==
- Wolf Albach-Retty as Peter Anders
- Vera Molnar as Inge Strohmayer
- Paul Kemp as Amadeus Strohmayer
- Käthe Haack as Tante Agathe
- Alice Treff as Frau Schleinitz
- Gisela Griffel as Lilo
- Ingeborg Körner as Fräulein Schleinitz
- Gustl Busch as Frau Wolf
- Albert Florath as Leopold Anders
- Hans Schwarz Jr. as Boxer-Franz
- Bobby Todd as Taschen-August
- Ludwig Röger as Tango-Poldi
- Hans Leibelt as Direktor Schleinitz
- Franz Schafheitlin as Dr. Roeder
- Carl Voscherau as Bauer Rieder
- Horst von Otto as Herr Spuller
- Kurt Meister as Gutsverwalter Gruber

== Bibliography ==
- Hans-Michael Bock and Tim Bergfelder. The Concise Cinegraph: An Encyclopedia of German Cinema. Berghahn Books, 2009.
