= Derby (1949 film) =

1949 film

- Directed by: Roger von Norman
- Written by: Stefanie von Below; Roger von Norman
- Produced by: Walter Koppel; Gyula Trebitsch
- Starring: Hannelore Schroth; Willy Fritsch; Heinz Engelmann
- Cinematography: Ekkehard Kyrath
- Edited by: Klaus Dudenhöfer
- Music by: Franz Grothe
- Production company: Real Film
- Distributed by: Herzog Film
- Release date: 27 August 1949
- Running time: 83 minutes
- Country: West Germany
- Language: German

Derby is a 1949 West German sports film directed by Roger von Norman and starring Hannelore Schroth, Willy Fritsch, and Heinz Engelmann. It was made by Real Film at the Wandsbek Studios in Hamburg with location filming on the Altes Land. The film's sets were designed by the art director Mathias Matthies.

== Plot ==
The veterinarian Benningsen is called because of an urgent case on the Pferdegestüt Gut Lindenhof. There are problems with the mare Atalante. Benningsen is surprised to see Barbara Hessling. Both know each other from earlier, and their reunion clearly shows that the last time they parted ways, there were problems.

Flashback. Dieter Benningsen and Barbara had met four years earlier when he had successfully worked as an obstetrician on one of their horses, Ariadne, whom she thought to be suffering from colic. The young foal is baptized by landowner Dahlen Atalante. Dahlen, who was friends with Barbara's father, gifts her Atalante. The much older man apparently takes a (probably not only paternal) interest in the young woman. Barbara has already given Dieter her heart, but he must move to Hanover for a year to complete his veterinary studies there. Some time later, Dahlen invites Barbara to join Atalante for the Yearling Show. Also Dieter Benningsen appears there. While the guests attend the derby, Benningsen makes Barbara a marriage proposal, which she accepts. A little later, Atalante is successively trained to become a racehorse. Master jockey Hans Rönning even allows Barbara to do it herself. Finally, the first derby start for Atalante is imminent. In fact, Rönning can win the race with Atalante. As Barbara begins to devote more and more attention to her horse and racing, Benningsen is increasingly annoyed by the fact that his future wife apparently hardly knows any other topic. Benningsen announces to Barbara that they should not see each other for a while.

Meanwhile, a friend of Dahlens, Evelyn Nauman, who owns the strongest competition horse with "Hannibal", tries to sow intrigue with Barbara, who decides to train Atalante herself. Finally, in a pro race to a direct comparison between Atalante and Hannibal, Atalante barely wins. Too bad luck, Atalante pulls a little later a Sehnenzerrung, so Rönning refuses to lead the battered horse in the coming, big Derby. Instead, he plans to direct Hannibal. Barbara is disappointed. In this situation, the worn-out aging jockey Konny Schmidt offers to help Barbara, who hopes to be able to come out of his lows again. He says that you have to handle Atalante just right, then he could win with her tomorrow's derby. Barbara leaves Konny on her horse, although Dieter Bennigsen had urgently advised against it. Hannibal barely wins the race because Atalante begins to lame just before the finish. Barbara realizes that she has overwhelmed her horse, who probably can not run a race anymore. Dahlen offers to stay with Atalante at his stud farm. End of the flashback.

Again in the present time. Benningsen and Barbara spent the night with Atalante, who gave birth to a foal. Dieter and Barbara decide to try it again.

== Cast ==
- Hannelore Schroth as Barbara Hessling
- Willy Fritsch as Dahlen
- Heinz Engelmann as Dr. Dieter Benningsen
- Gerda Maria Terno as Evelyn Naumann
- Albert Florath as Benningsen sen.
- Hans Frömming as Hans Rönning
- Carsta Löck
- Margarete Slezak
- Joseph Offenbach
- Hans Palussi as Rudi, Stallknecht
- Karl-Heinz Peters
- Gerd Petersen
- Arnold Risch
- Carl-Heinz Schroth as Koney Schmidt

== See also ==
- List of films about horses
- List of films about horse racing

== Bibliography ==
- Bock, Hans-Michael; Bergfelder, Tim, eds. (2009). The Concise Cinegraph: Encyclopaedia of German Cinema. New York: Berghahn Books. ISBN 978-1-57181-655-9.
