= Doctor Crippen Lives =

1958 film

- Directed by: Erich Engels
- Written by: Erich Engels; Wolf Neumeister
- Produced by: Walter Koppel; Gyula Trebitsch
- Starring: Elisabeth Müller; Peter van Eyck; Fritz Tillmann
- Cinematography: Albert Benitz
- Edited by: Alice Ludwig
- Music by: Siegfried Franz
- Production company: Real Film
- Distributed by: Europa-Filmverleih
- Release date: 20 February 1958
- Running time: 88 minutes
- Country: West Germany
- Language: German

Doctor Crippen Lives (German: Dr. Crippen lebt) is a 1958 West German crime film directed by Erich Engels and starring Elisabeth Müller, Peter van Eyck and Fritz Tillmann. It was made at the Wandsbek Studios of Real Film in Hamburg. The film's sets were designed by the art director Dieter Bartels.

The most successful film of all time of director Erich Engels was Doctor Crippen (1942), a film about Hawley Harvey Crippen. The 1958 film Doctor Crippen Lives has no relation to the 1942 film or to the case of Hawley Harvey Crippen.

== Cast ==
- Elisabeth Müller as Fleur Blanchard
- Peter van Eyck as Kriminalkommissar Léon Ferrier
- Fritz Tillmann as Kriminalinspektor Steen
- Carl Lange as Aristide Coq, Buchhändler
- Günter Pfitzmann as Pierre, Kriminalassistent
- Inge Meysel as Delphine, Haushälterin
- Katharina Mayberg as Maja, malaisische Studentin
- Hans Zesch-Ballot as Prosecutor
- Robert Meyn as Chefinspektor Smith
- Hans Stiebner as Lung, chinesischer Steward
- Richard Münch as Reverend Bennet
- Werner Schumacher
- Manfred Steffen
- Howard Vernon
- Heinz Klingenberg
- Fred Raul as
- Benno Gellenbeck
- Friedrich Schütter as Polizist
- Hermann Kner
- Günther Jerschke as Gendarm
- Karl Heinz Wüpper
- Reiner Brönneke

== Bibliography ==
- Davidson, John & Hake, Sabine. Framing the Fifties: Cinema in a Divided Germany. Berghahn Books, 2007.
