= The Woman by the Dark Window =

1960 film

- Directed by: Franz Peter Wirth
- Written by: Jochen Huth; Hugo Maria Kritz (short story)
- Produced by: Walter Koppel; Gyula Trebitsch
- Starring: Marianne Koch; Christiane Nielsen; Robert Graf
- Cinematography: Günther Senftleben
- Edited by: Claus von Boro
- Music by: Martin Böttcher
- Production company: Real Film
- Distributed by: Europa Filmverleih
- Release date: 17 March 1960
- Running time: 97 minutes
- Country: West Germany
- Language: German

The Woman by the Dark Window (German: Die Frau am dunklen Fenster) is a 1960 West German drama film directed by Franz Peter Wirth and starring Marianne Koch, Christiane Nielsen and Robert Graf.

It was made at the Wandsbek Studios by the Hamburg-based company Real Film. The film's sets were designed by the art directors Albrecht Becker and Herbert Kirchhoff.

== Cast ==
- Marianne Koch as Luise Konradin
- Christiane Nielsen as Karin Becker
- Robert Graf as Thomas Melchior
- Heinz Drache as Andreas Wegner
- Alice Treff as Frau Konradin
- Hans Paetsch as Dr. Mertens
- Fritz Schröder-Jahn as Gerichtsvorsitzender
- Erwin Linder as Brasch

== Bibliography ==
- Bock, Hans-Michael & Bergfelder, Tim. The Concise Cinegraph: Encyclopaedia of German Cinema. Berghahn Books, 2009.
