= Abundance of Life =

1950 film

- Directed by: Wolfgang Liebeneiner
- Written by: Artur A. Kuhnert; Wolfgang Liebeneiner; Ludwig Tieck (novel)
- Produced by: Walter Koppel; Gyula Trebitsch
- Starring: Erika Müller; Ingeborg Körner; Gunnar Möller
- Cinematography: Willy Winterstein
- Edited by: Walter Fredersdorf
- Music by: Michael Jary
- Production company: Real Film
- Distributed by: Allianz Filmverleih
- Release date: 18 May 1950
- Running time: 82 minutes
- Country: West Germany
- Language: German

Abundance of Life (German: Des Lebens Überfluss) is a 1950 West German romantic comedy film directed by Wolfgang Liebeneiner and starring Erika Müller, Ingeborg Körner, and Gunnar Möller. It was one of the last of the Rubble films made in the immediate post-war years. It updates a story by Ludwig Tieck to modern-day Hamburg, addressing the shortage of housing in the heavily bombed city.

It was made at the Wandsbek Studios in Hamburg and also shot on location in the city. The film's sets were designed by the art director Mathias Matthies.

== Cast ==
- Erika Müller as Karin Jäger, Studentin
- Olaf Torsten as Werner Rütting, Student
- Ingeborg Körner as Strupps, Studentin
- Gunnar Möller as Felix Engler, Student
- Harald Holberg as Sir, Student
- Hans Schwarz Jr. as Hugo
- Fritz Kampers as Gottlieb
- Margarete Slezak as Frau Holst
- Joseph Offenbach as Herr Holst
- Hedwig Schmitz as Frau Jürgens
- Arnim Suessenguth as Herr Jürgens
- Volker von Collande as Sarghändler
- Ursula V. Bose as Frau des Sarghändlers
- Marianne Wischmann as Geschminktes Mädchen
- Kurt A. Jung as Heini Lude
- Willibald Alexis as Leichenwagenkutscher
- Kurt Fuß as Ziehharmonikaspieler
- Holger Ungerer as Karlchen
- Oskar Meyer
- Katharina Brauren
- Betty Mergler
- Paul Schirrmann
- Charlotte Harke
- Marga Maasberg
- Alexander Hunzinger as Sänger bei den Musikanten
- Franz Schafheitlin as Professor
- Hans Friedrich as Kriminalbeamter
- Willy Witte as Verkäufer
- Bruno Klockmann as Handwerksmeister
- Helga Keck as Studentin
- Marianne Molitor as Studentin
- Hannelore Fitzau as Studentin
- Hanni Hagel as Ärztin
- Hannelore Müller as Studentin
- Annelore Wied as Studentin
