= My Wife's Friends =

1949 film

- Directed by: Hans Deppe
- Written by: Thea Brecht; Jochen Kuhlmey
- Produced by: Gyula Trebitsch
- Starring: Sonja Ziemann; Grethe Weiser; Gerda Maurus
- Cinematography: Heinz Schnackertz
- Edited by: Klaus Dudenhöfer
- Music by: Willi Kollo
- Production company: Real Film
- Distributed by: Herzog Film
- Release date: 25 August 1949
- Running time: 85 minutes
- Country: West Germany
- Language: German

My Wife's Friends (German: Die Freunde meiner Frau) is a 1949 West German comedy film directed by Hans Deppe and starring Sonja Ziemann, Grethe Weiser and Gerda Maurus. It was made by Real Film at the Wandsbek Studios in Hamburg. The film's sets were designed by the art directors Herbert Kirchhoff and Mathias Matthies.

== Cast ==
- Sonja Ziemann as Fee Freiberg - Kabarettistin
- Grethe Weiser as Lotte - Mädchen bei Brinkmann
- Gerda Maurus as Frau Grete Brinkmann
- Carl-Heinz Schroth as Walter Brinkmann - Bücherrevisor
- Albert Florath as Herr Fricke - Wirt vom Heidehof
- Arno Assmann as Bernd Freiberg - Textdichter
- Carl Voscherau as Wild - und Geflügelhändler Kühn
- Horst Gentzen as Bodo Kühn - Genannt Bulli
- Michael Chevalier as Herbert Brinkmann - Kind
- Baerbel Lutz as Uschi Brinkmann, Kind
- Heinz Schröder as Hänschen Brinkmann - Kind
- Mia Adomat
- Ludwig Röger
- Horst von Otto

== Bibliography ==
- Bock, Hans-Michael & Bergfelder, Tim. The Concise CineGraph. Encyclopedia of German Cinema. Berghahn Books, 2009.
