= Unbekannt =

Unbekannt, which is the German word for unknown, may refer to:

Films:

- Absender unbekannt, 1950
- "Code: unbekannt", a.k.a. Code Unknown, 2000
