= Third from the Right =

1950 film

- German film poster
- German: Die Dritte von rechts
- Directed by: Géza von Cziffra
- Written by: Géza von Cziffra
- Produced by: Walter Koppel; Gyula Trebitsch
- Starring: Vera Molnar; Robert Lindner; Peter van Eyck
- Cinematography: Willy Winterstein
- Edited by: Alice Ludwig
- Music by: Michael Jary
- Production company: Real Film
- Distributed by: Allianz Filmverleih
- Release date: 25 December 1950
- Running time: 97 minutes
- Country: West Germany
- Language: German

Third from the Right (German: Die Dritte von rechts) is a 1950 West German musical crime film directed by Géza von Cziffra and starring Vera Molnar, Robert Lindner and Peter van Eyck. It was made by the Hamburg-based company Real Film at the Wandsbek Studios in the city. The film's sets were designed by the art director Herbert Kirchhoff.

== Synopsis ==
Aspiring stage star Katrin has so far got no further than appearing third from the right in the chorus line. To advance her career she agrees to meet a financial backer of shows for dinner. When she arrives at his apartment he is laying there dead. In the eyes of the investigating police detective she is the top suspect, although several others had good cause to murder him.

== Cast ==
- Vera Molnar as Katrin
- Robert Lindner as Viktor
- Peter van Eyck as Renato
- Marianne Wischmann as Asta
- Grethe Weiser as Lotte Brühl
- Paul Kemp as Hähnchen
- Oskar Sima as Schneider
- Rudolf Platte as Braun
- Arno Paulsen as Herwitz
- Willi Rose as detective commissioner Metz
- Hans Zesch-Ballot as Kriminalrat Bittner
- Carl Voscherau as Inspizient Müller
- Josef Dahmen as Josef, waiter
- Willy Witte as Chauffeur
- Kurt Meister as Kriminalbeamter
- Benno Gellenbeck as Managing director of the Kakadu Bar
- Eva Pflug as Hilde
- Edelweiß Malchin as Gerda
- Katharina Brauren as Frau Goll
- Edmond Ardisson
- Erwin Bredow
- Iska Geri
- Gerhard Gregor
- Alfred Hause
- Evelyn Künneke
- Maria Litto
- Bruce Low
- Laszlo Nyaky
- Gabor Orban
- Laya Raki as exotic dancer
- Kurt Reimann
- Gertrud Söderling-Hiller
- Horst von Otto
- Gerhard Wendland
