= The Allure of Danger =

1950 film directed by Eugen York

- Directed by: Eugen York
- Written by: Artur A. Kuhnert
- Produced by: Walter Koppel; Gyula Trebitsch
- Starring: Angelika Hauff; Walter Richter; Berta Drews
- Cinematography: Albert Benitz
- Edited by: Alice Ludwig
- Music by: Michael Jary
- Production company: Real Film
- Distributed by: Allianz Filmverleih
- Release date: 8 December 1950
- Running time: 76 minutes
- Country: West Germany
- Language: German

The Allure of Danger (German: Lockende Gefahr) is a 1950 West German drama film directed by Eugen York and starring Angelika Hauff, Walter Richter and Berta Drews. It was screened at the 1950 Venice Film Festival.

It was shot at the Wandsbek Studios and on location around Hamburg. The film's sets were designed by the art director Mathias Matthies.

== Synopsis ==
A boy befriends a fisherman.

== Cast ==
- Angelika Hauff as Tessy
- Walter Richter as Jens
- Adi Lödel as Uli
- Berta Drews as Ulis Mutter
- Werner Riepel as Kalli
- Marga Maasberg as Frau Schwenz
- Willibald Alexis as Sänger
- Addi Adametz as Lilo
- Alexander Hunzinger as Wirt Willy
- Rudi Gerdes as Onje
- Kurt A. Jung as Hendrik
- Bruce Low
- Liselotte Malkowsky as Sing

== Bibliography ==
- Youngkin, Stephen. The Lost One: A Life of Peter Lorre. University Press of Kentucky, 2005.
