= The Man in Search of Himself =

1950 film

- Film poster
- German: Der Mann, der sich selber sucht
- Directed by: Géza von Cziffra
- Written by: Rudolf Köller; Géza von Cziffra
- Produced by: Michael Margaritoff
- Starring: Vera Molnar; Wolf Albach-Retty; Petra Trautmann
- Cinematography: Willy Winterstein
- Edited by: Alice Ludwig
- Music by: Michael Jary
- Production company: NEO Film
- Distributed by: Allianz Filmverleih
- Release date: 18 August 1958
- Running time: 84 minutes
- Country: West Germany
- Language: German

The Man in Search of Himself (German: Der Mann, der sich selber sucht) is a 1950 West German comedy crime film directed by Géza von Cziffra and starring Vera Molnar, Wolf Albach-Retty and Petra Trautmann. The film was made at the Wandsbek Studios in Hamburg. The film's sets were designed by the art director Herbert Kirchhoff. It was shot on location in Hamburg, the Bavarian Alps, and the French Riviera.

== Cast ==
- Vera Molnar as Victoria Miller
- Wolf Albach-Retty as Marius Aldon
- Petra Trautmann as Jeanette
- Karl Schönböck as Jack d'Alimonte
- Paul Kemp as Theobald Finger
- Hans Leibelt as Mr. Miller
- Hubert von Meyerinck as Director Cattoni
- Bobby Todd as Sandro, Portier
- Rudolf Platte as Samba-Heini
- Rita Paul as bar singer
- Peter Field
- Michael Jary as Pianist
- Nicolas Koline
- Adalbert Kriwat
- Wolfgang Neuss
- Joseph Offenbach
- Carl Voscherau
