= The Shadow of Herr Monitor =

1950 film directed by Eugen York

- Directed by: Eugen York
- Written by: Ernst Nebhut; Just Scheu
- Produced by: Walter Koppel; Gyula Trebitsch
- Starring: Carl Raddatz; Paul Dahlke; Marianne Wischmann
- Cinematography: Ekkehard Kyrath; Willy Winterstein
- Edited by: Alice Ludwig
- Music by: Wolfgang Zeller
- Production company: Real Film
- Distributed by: Allianz Filmverleih
- Release date: 5 September 1950
- Running time: 81 minutes
- Country: West Germany
- Language: German

The Shadow of Herr Monitor (German: Der Schatten des Herrn Monitor) is a 1950 West German crime film directed by Eugen York and starring Carl Raddatz, Paul Dahlke and Marianne Wischmann. It was shot at the Wandsbek Studios of Real Film in Hamburg. The film's sets were designed by the art director Mathias Matthies.

== Synopsis ==
Thomas and his friend Christoph Monitor are both in love with the same woman, Petra. When she chooses to marry Christoph, Thomas is devastated and begins plotting a slow revenge involving Robb a former sailor who is an exact doppelgänger of his former friend. Dressed as Monitor, Robb begins committing a series of robberies leading the arrest and trial of the innocent man.

== Cast ==
- Carl Raddatz as Christoph Monitor/Robb
- Paul Dahlke as Thomas Gossip
- Marianne Wischmann as Petra Monitor
- Catja Görna as Genia
- Carl-Heinz Schroth as Metter
- Carl Voscherau as Portier
- Just Scheu as Gerichtsvollzieher
- Heinz Klingenberg as Staatsanwalt
- Willy Maertens as Dr. Bing
- Josef Dahmen as Hafenarbeiter
- Arnim Dahl as Hafenarbeiter
- Alexander Hunzinger as Nachwächter
- Bruno Klockmann as Portier im Nachtlokal
- Horst Szielasko as Lieferwagenfahrer
- Erich Weiher as Beifahrer im Lieferwagen
- Kurt A. Jung as Motorradfahrer
- Änne Bruck as Elegante Dame
- Heinz Saller as Dr. Bergs
- Gustl Busch as Dienstmädchen bei Monitor
- Joseph Offenbach as Postbeamter
- Konrad Mayerhoff as Postbeamter

== Bibliography ==
- Bock, Hans-Michael & Bergfelder, Tim. The Concise CineGraph. Encyclopedia of German Cinema. Berghahn Books, 2009.
- Hoffmann, Hilmar & Schobert, Walter (ed.) Zwischen gestern und morgen: westdeutscher Nachkriegsfilm 1946-1962. Deutsches Filmmuseum, 1989.
