= Carl Voscherau =

German actor

- Born: 24 December 1900; Hamburg, German Empire
- Died: 24 August 1963 (aged 62); Hamburg, West Germany
- Occupation: Actor
- Years active: 1948–1963 (film)

Carl Voscherau (1900–1963) was a German film actor. He was also a prominent voice actor, dubbing foreign films for release in Germany. His son Henning Voscherau was Mayor of Hamburg.

== Selected filmography ==
- Film Without a Title (1948)
- The Original Sin (1948)
- Blocked Signals (1948)
- I'll Never Forget That Night (1949)
- Artists' Blood (1949)
- Dangerous Guests (1949)
- Second Hand Destiny (1949)
- My Wife's Friends (1949)
- Only One Night (1950)
- The Girl from the South Seas (1950)
- The Man in Search of Himself (1950)
- Thirteen Under One Hat (1950)
- Third from the Right (1950)
- The Shadow of Herr Monitor (1950)
- Shadows in the Night (1950)
- You Have to be Beautiful (1951)
- Under the Thousand Lanterns (1952)
- Shooting Stars (1952)
- The Thief of Bagdad (1952)
- The Flower of Hawaii (1953)
- Under the Stars of Capri (1953)
- Come Back (1953)
- Not Afraid of Big Animals (1953)
- The Mosquito (1954)
- Two Blue Eyes (1955)
- How Do I Become a Film Star? (1955)
- Operation Sleeping Bag (1955)
- The Marriage of Doctor Danwitz (1956)
- The Heart of St. Pauli (1957)
- The Muzzle (1958)
- The Man Who Couldn't Say No (1958)
- The Blue Moth (1959)
- Freddy, the Guitar and the Sea (1959)
- The Night Before the Premiere (1959)

== Bibliography ==
- Shandley, Robert. Rubble Films: German Cinema in the Shadow of the Third Reich. Temple University Press, 2010.
