= Hans Paetsch =

German actor

- Born: 7 December 1909; Altmünsterol, Germany (now Montreux-Vieux, France)
- Died: 3 February 2002 (aged 92); Hamburg, Germany
- Occupation: Actor
- Years active: 1939–2002

Hans Paetsch (7 December 1909 – 3 February 2002) was a German actor. He appeared in 52 films between 1939 and 2002. He is most notable for his voice acting, especially as a narrator of fairy tales and audio dramas.

== Selected filmography ==
- New Year's Eve on Alexanderplatz (1939) - Rudi Lingenfelder
- Mein Mann darf es nicht wissen (1940) - Fritz Korn
- Blutsbrüderschaft (1941) - Kommunist
- Happiness is the Main Thing (1941) - Unverheiratetet Kollege (uncredited)
- Comrades (1941) - Leutnant von Flemming
- Ein Zug fährt ab (1942) - Journalist Dr. Teßmer
- Fünftausend Mark Belohnung (1942) - Dr. Fritz Vogt
- Sieben Briefe (1944) - Kriminalkommissar (uncredited)
- Insolent and in Love (1948) - Ober
- Law of Love (1949) - Junker Graf Oynhausen
- The Lie (1950)
- Made in Germany (1957) - Der Großherzog
- The Heart of St. Pauli (1957) - Käpt'n Martens
- The Man Who Sold Himself (1959) - Steinmaker
- Stalingrad: Dogs, Do You Want to Live Forever? (1959) - Biologe
- Of Course, the Motorists (1959) - Polizeipräsident
- The Blue Moth (1959) - Richter
- The Buddenbrooks (1959) - Arnoldsen
- The Woman by the Dark Window (1960) - Dr. Mertens
- Yes, Women are Dangerous (1960) - William Bancroft
- Im Namen einer Mutter (1960) - Vorsitzender
- The Ambassador (1960)
- Officer Factory (1960)
- The Dead Eyes of London (1961) - Gordon Stuart
- Murder Party (1961) - Kriminalkommissar Ullmann
- Barbara (1961) - Inselvogt Harme
- The Puzzle of the Red Orchid (1962) - Lord Arlington
- The Inn on the River (1962) - Rechtsanwalt
- Durchbruch Lok 234 (1963) - Professor Pollnow
- Teufel im Fleisch (1964) - Mann (narrator, uncredited)
- Mark of the Tortoise (1964) - Sir Cyrus Bradley
- Sir Roger Casement (1968, TV Series) - Edward Grey
- Maximilian von Mexiko (1970, TV Series) - Papst Pius IX.
- The Eddie Chapman Story (1971, TV film) - Botschraftsrat
- Das Erbe der Guldenburgs (1987-1990, TV Series) - Dr. Hollander
- Wer zu spät kommt – Das Politbüro erlebt die deutsche Revolution (1990, TV Movie) - Horst Sindermann
- Das serbische Mädchen (1991)
- The Magic Voyage (1992) - Narrator (German version, narrator)
- Otto – Der Liebesfilm (1992) - Gott (narrator, uncredited)
- Sommer der Liebe (1992) - Erzähler (narrator)
- Sieben Monde (1998) - Präparator / Preparator
- Run Lola Run (1998) - Erzähler (narrator, uncredited)
- Hui Buh: The Goofy Ghost (2006) - Narrator (uncredited) (final film role)
