= Diesel (1942 film) =

1942 film

- Directed by: Gerhard Lamprecht
- Written by: Richard H. Riedel; Frank Thieß; Gerhard Lamprecht
- Based on: Diesel: Der Mensch, Das Werk, Das Schicksal by Eugen Diesel
- Produced by: Richard H. Riedel
- Starring: Willy Birgel; Hilde Weissner; Paul Wegener; Josef Sieber
- Cinematography: Georg Krause
- Edited by: Wolfgang Wehrum
- Music by: Hans-Otto Borgmann
- Production company: UFA
- Distributed by: UFA
- Release date: 13 November 1942
- Running time: 109 minutes
- Country: Nazi Germany
- Language: German
- Budget: 2,349,000 ℛ︁ℳ︁

Diesel is a 1942 German biographical film directed by Gerhard Lamprecht and starring Willy Birgel, Hilde Weissner, and Paul Wegener. It portrays the life of Rudolf Diesel, the German inventor of the diesel engine. It was one of a series of prestigious biopics made in Nazi Germany portraying genius inventors or artists struggling against the societies in which they live. The film was based on a biography by Eugen Diesel, one of Diesel's children.

It was shot at the Babelsberg Studios in Berlin. The film's sets were designed by art director Erich Kettelhut. Made on a large budget of 2,349,000 ℛ︁ℳ︁, the film was a popular box office success and recouped its production costs.

== Cast ==
- Willy Birgel as Rudolf Diesel
- Hilde Weissner as Martha Diesel
- Paul Wegener as Director Buz
- Josef Sieber as Martin
- Arthur Schröder as Lucian Vogel
- Hilde von Stolz as Mrs. von Lorrenz
- Erich Ponto Theodor Diesel
- Werner Pledath as Prof. Carl von Linde
- Herbert Gernot as Krumper
- Walter Janssen as Professor Barnickel
- Hans Schulz as Big Worker
- Heinz Evelt as Small Worker
- Heinrich Marlow as Prof. Lüders
- Karl-Heinz Peters as Engineer Scheuermann
- Albert Florath as The Physician
- Otto F. Henning as Gilhausen
- Viggo Larsen as a Professor
- Leo Peukert as an Old Tugboat Captain
- Heinrich Troxbömker as Krupp
- Paul Westermeier as The Master Butcher
- Eduard Bornträger as Member of the Krupp Board
- Michael Braun as Rudolf Diesel as a 12-year-old
- Josef Dahmen as Machinist at Buz
- Gerhard Dammann as a Furniture Packer
- Angelo Ferrari as Visitor in Krupp's Front Room
- Hellmuth Passarge as Machinist at Buz
- Karl Platen as the Office Employee in the Outer Room at Krupp
- Gustav Püttjer as a Furniture Packer
- Babsi Schultz-Reckewell as Luise
- Rudolf Vones as Machinist at Buz
- Franz Zimmermann as an Officer, Guest at Reception
- Klaus Pohl as Office Employee at Buz
- Hubert von Meyerinck as Mr. von Lorrenz
- Hadrian Maria Netto
- Hermann Pfeiffer
- Roma Bahn
- Robert Forsch
- Hildegard Grethe
- Karl Hannemann
- Ellen Krug
- Olga Limburg
- Ilse Stobrawa
- Franz Weber

== Bibliography ==
- Fox, Jo (2007) [2006]. Film Propaganda in Britain and Nazi Germany: World War II Cinema. Oxford: Berg. ISBN 978-1-85973-896-2.
