= Arno Assmann =

German actor

- Born: 30 July 1908
- Died: 30 November 1979 (aged 71)
- Occupations: Actor, film director and television writer

Arno Assmann (30 July 1908 – 30 November 1979) was a German actor, film director and television writer. He committed suicide.

== Filmography ==
=== As an actor ===
- The Original Sin (1948)
- The Last Illusion (1949)
- My Wife's Friends (1949)
- The Orplid Mystery (1950)
- Harbour Melody (1950)
- Gabriela (1950)
- Decision Before Dawn (1951)
- Sensation in San Remo (1951)
- Woe to Him Who Loves (1951)
- The Csardas Princess (1951)
- The Divorcée (1953)
- Rose-Girl Resli (1954)
- Homesick for Germany (1954)
- Hilfe – sie liebt mich (1956)
- Max the Pickpocket (1962)
- The German Lesson (1971, TV film)
- The Stuff That Dreams Are Made Of (1972)
- Bauern, Bonzen und Bomben (1973, TV miniseries)
- Der Springteufel (1974; TV film)
- Der Stechlin (1975, TV miniseries)
- Jauche und Levkojen (1978, TV series)

=== As a director ===
- I Will Always Be Yours (1960)
