= Karl John (actor) =

German actor (1905–1977)

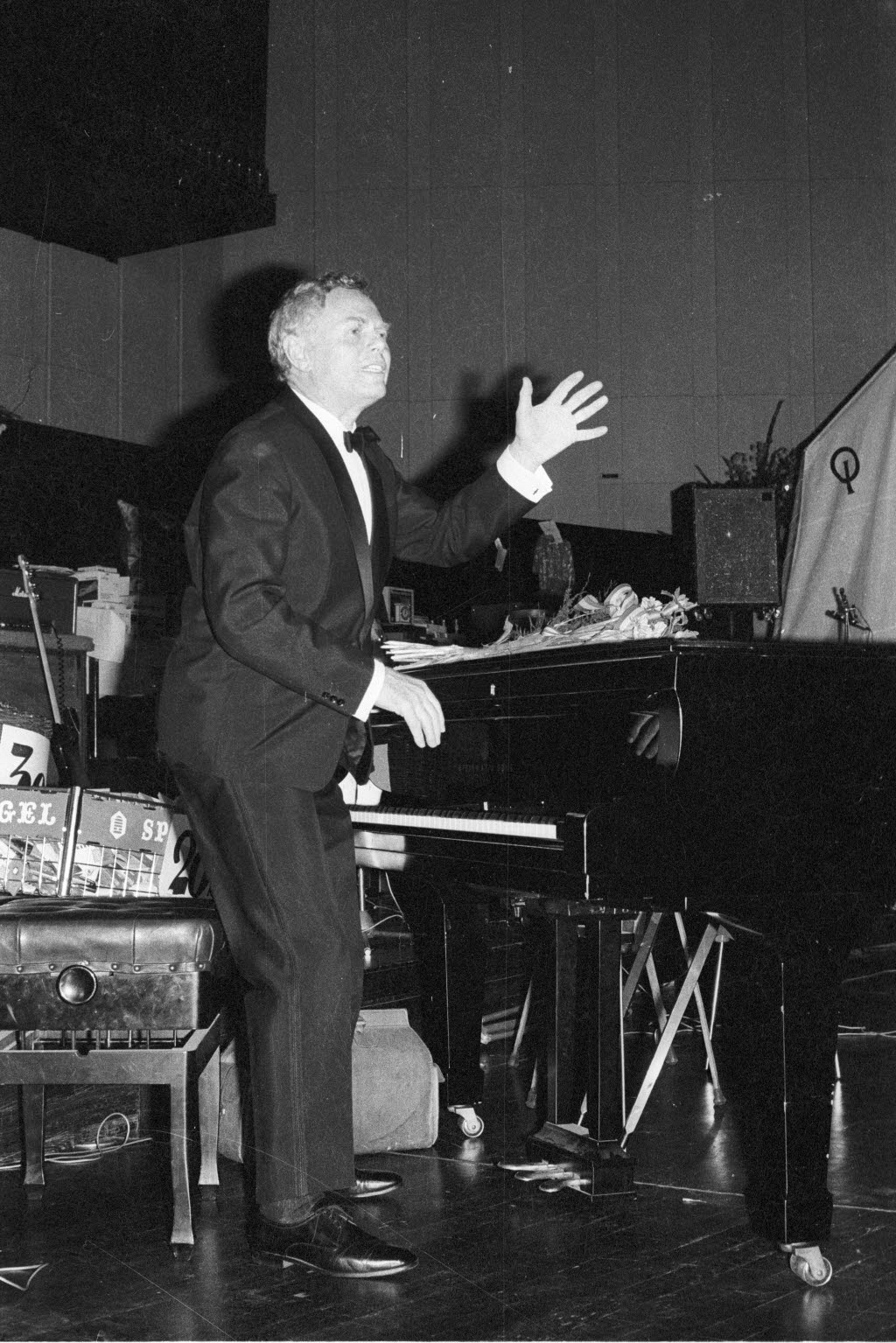
- Actor Karl John presents himself as the singer of Hans Albers songs. 1972
- Born: 24 March 1905; Cologne, German Empire
- Died: 22 December 1977 (aged 72); Gütersloh, West Germany
- Occupation: Actor
- Years active: 1932–1977

Karl John (24 March 1905 – 22 December 1977) was a German film actor who appeared in more than 50 films between 1933 and 1977.

== Early life ==
John was born in Cologne, Germany. He studied architecture at the Technische Hochschule in Danzig. But he soon discovered his love for the stage and moved to Berlin where he took acting lessons.

== Career ==
At 26 he made his debut performance at a theater in Boleslawiec. John made his first film appearance in the 1932 thriller The White Demon which also starred Hans Albers in the lead role. Throughout the 1930s he played numerous roles at various theaters throughout Nazi Germany. In 1938, John came to the prestigious Deutsches Theater in Berlin.

At the outbreak of World War II John appeared in many German propaganda films made by the Reichs Ministry of Public Enlightenment and Propaganda under the auspices of Reich Minister Joseph Goebbels. He played soldiers and sailors, he also voiced information films on the role of dive bombers, tanks and submarines. However, in 1943 he was sentenced to death by the People's Court for espousing "defeatist views" after Goebbels became aware he had been making "jokes about Hitler". His sentence was commuted to service in Wehrmacht.

After World War II, John played several roles in various anti-war German films. In 1947 he starred in In Those Days and Love 47, an adaption of Wolfgang Borchert's play The Man Outside. John also played a Gestapo agent in Peter Lorre's only directorial outing, the German-language Der Verlorene in 1951.

Throughout the 1950s John often portrayed members of the Wehrmacht such as in Des Teufels General (1955), Hunde, wollt ihr ewig leben (1957) and Officer Factory (1960). In 1962 John played a German general in Darryl F. Zanuck's international 1962 war epic The Longest Day.

In the 1960s, he appeared in several stage productions based on adaptation of the works of British writer and journalist, Edgar Wallace. In the 1970s John also made guest appearances on West German television crime shows including Derrick, Tatort, and Der Kommissar.

Throughout his career John continued to do voice over work. In 1959 he became the voice of Paul Temple in an eight-part radio play based on the works of Francis Durbridge. The series was directed by future award winner Willy Purucker.

== Death ==
On 20 December 1977, the 72-year-old John collapsed shortly before a performance of "Moon Over the River" by Pavel Kohout at the Theater Gütersloh in Gütersloh. He died two days later at the city hospital from cardiovascular disease. He was buried at Friedhof Heerstraße in Berlin.

== Selected filmography ==
- The White Demon (1932)
- When the Cock Crows (1936) – Piepers Gustav
- Weiße Sklaven (1937) – Graf Kostja Wolfgoff
- Unternehmen Michael (1937) – Leutnant Hassenkamp
- Der Lachdoktor (1937) – Peter Karst, Lehrer
- Legion Condor (1939)
- Bal paré (1940) – Erstchargierter Franz Stanglmayer
- Die unvollkommene Liebe (1940) – Kristas Brudr Gustl
- Kora Terry (1940) – Chef der Kraftmännertruppe
- Fahrt ins Leben (1940) – Seekadett Gerhard Bartels
- My Life for Ireland (1941) – Raymond Davitt
- Above All Else in the World (1941) – Olt. Hassencamp
- The Way to Freedom (1941) – Fritz
- U-Boote westwärts! (1941) – Matrosenobergefreiter Drewitz
- Stukas (1941) – Oberleutnant Lothar Loos
- Two in a Big City (1942) – Bernd Birckhoff
- Andreas Schlüter (1942) – Martin Böhme
- Melody of a Great City (1943) – Klaus Nolte
- In Those Days (1947) – Peter Keyser / 1. Geschichte
- Unser Mittwochabend (1948) – Erik
- The Last Night (1949) – Harald Buchner, Oberleutnant
- Love '47 (1949) – Beckmann
- The Lost One (1951) – Hösch, alias Nowak
- The Smugglers' Banquet (1952) – Hans
- The Man Between (1953) – Inspector Kleiber
- No Way Back (1953) – Friedrich Schultz
- Des Teufels General (1955) – Ingenieur Karl Oderbruch
- Hotel Adlon (1955) – Herr von Malbrand
- Urlaub auf Ehrenwort (1955) – Köhler
- Stalingrad: Dogs, Do You Want to Live Forever? (1959) – Generaloberst Hoth
- Two Times Adam, One Time Eve (1959) – Wickström
- Sacred Waters (1960) – Seppi Blatter, Romans Vater
- Officer Factory (1960) – Major Frey
- This Time It Must Be Caviar (1961) – Debras
- The Longest Day (1962) – Gen. Wolfgang Häger
- Der Hexer (1964) – Shelby
- Neues vom Hexer (1965) – Dr. Mills
- Babeck (1968, TV miniseries) – Hohmann
- Land (1972, TV film) – Albrecht Rotter
- Sabine (1974) – Dr. Gerd Hesse
- Dandelions (1974) – Ricks Vater
- Derrick (1976, Season 3, Episode 8: "Auf eigene Faust") – Euler
- Sorcerer (1977) – 'Marquez'

== Notes ==
Citations

Sources

- Kay Weniger: Das große Personenlexikon des Films. Die Schauspieler, Regisseure, Kameraleute, Produzenten, Komponisten, Drehbuchautoren, Filmarchitekten, Ausstatter, Kostümbildner, Cutter, Tontechniker, Maskenbildner und Special Effects Designer des 20. Jahrhunderts. Band 4: H – L. Botho Höfer – Richard Lester. Schwarzkopf & Schwarzkopf, Berlin 2001, ISBN 3-89602-340-3, p. 230
