= Josef Sieber =

German actor

- Born: 28 April 1900; Witten, Ruhr, German Empire
- Died: 3 December 1962 (aged 62); Hamburg, West Germany
- Occupation: Film actor
- Years active: 1920–1962

Josef Sieber (28 April 1900 – 3 December 1962) was a German film actor.

== Selected filmography ==
- Pappi (1934)
- Punks Arrives from America (1935)
- Joan of Arc (1935)
- The Gypsy Baron (1935)
- The Last Four on Santa Cruz (1936)
- Men Without a Fatherland (1937)
- The Mystery of Betty Bonn (1938)
- Northern Lights (1938)
- Comrades at Sea (1938)
- The Holm Murder Case (1938)
- Robert Koch (1939)
- Water for Canitoga (1939)
- Bachelor's Paradise (1939)
- Man for Man (1939)
- Kora Terry (1940)
- The Three Codonas (1940)
- The Heart of a Queen (1940)
- People in the Storm (1941)
- Diesel (1942)
- The Big Game (1942)
- The Golden Spider (1943)
- Tonelli (1943)
- Harald Arrives at Nine (1944)
- That Was My Life (1944)
- Artists' Blood (1949)
- The Last Night (1949)
- Five Suspects (1950)
- Harbour Melody (1950)
- Furioso (1950)
- Good Fortune in Ohio (1950)
- Shadows in the Night (1950)
- The Heath is Green (1951)
- Dreaming Days (1951)
- Shooting Stars (1952)
- A Thousand Red Roses Bloom (1952)
- Klettermaxe (1952)
- Ave Maria (1953)
- Not Afraid of Big Animals (1953)
- The Bogeyman (1953)
- Daybreak (1954)
- The Country Schoolmaster (1954)
- The Immenhof Girls (1955)
- Heroism after Hours (1955)
- Lost Child 312 (1955)
- Hochzeit auf Immenhof (1956)
- Ferien auf Immenhof (1957)
- Three Men in a Boat (1961)
