= Helmuth M. Backhaus =

German actor, screenwriter and film director

- Born: 6 June 1920; Bonn, Germany
- Died: 5 May 1989 (aged 68); Munich, West Germany
- Occupations: Screenwriter; Director
- Years active: 1950-1965

Helmuth M. Backhaus (1920–1989) was a German actor, screenwriter and film director.

== Selected filmography ==
=== Screenwriter ===
- Love on Ice (1950)
- Czardas of Hearts (1951)
- The Model Husband (1956)
- At Green Cockatoo by Night (1957)
- The Schimeck Family (1957)
- The Star of Santa Clara (1958)
- The Csardas King (1958)
- The Night Before the Premiere (1959)
- Yes, Women are Dangerous (1960)
- The White Horse Inn (1960)
- The Adventures of Count Bobby (1961)
- Pichler's Books Are Not in Order (1961)
- River of Evil 1963)

=== Director ===
- Apartmentzauber (1963)
- If You Go Swimming in Tenerife (1964)
- The Bandits of the Rio Grande (1965)

=== Actor ===
- Weekend in Paradise (1952)
- That Can Happen to Anyone (1952)
- Scandal at the Girls' School (1953)

== Bibliography ==
- Flowers, John & Frizler, Paul. Psychotherapists on Film, 1899-1999. McFarland & Company, 2004.
