= Erna Sellmer =

German actress

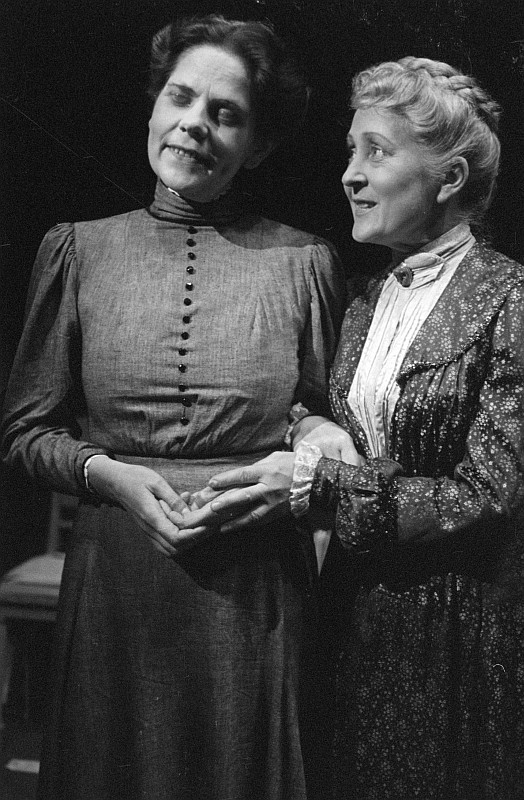
- Erna Sellmer (left) in 1945
- Born: Erna Elisabeth Dorothea Sellmer; 19 June 1905; Hamburg, Germany
- Died: 13 May 1983 (aged 77); Munich, West Germany
- Occupation: Film actor
- Years active: 1939–1983

Erna Elisabeth Dorothea Sellmer (19 June 1905 – 13 May 1983) was a German film actress. She was best known in the English-speaking world for her role as housekeeper Frau Gerber in the 1970s Swiss-Canadian television series George about a St. Bernard dog and its owners. In 1939 Sellmer provided the German language voiceover for Hattie McDaniel in her Academy award-winning role in Gone with the Wind.

== Selected filmography ==
- Liberated Hands (1939)
- The Girl from Barnhelm (1940)
- The Great Love (1942)
- Two in a Big City (1942)
- The Bath in the Barn (1943)
- A Flea in Her Ear (1943)
- Port of Freedom (1944)
- I Need You (1944)
- Murderers Among Us (1946)
- Thank You, I'm Fine (1948)
- Insolent and in Love (1948)
- The Girl from the South Seas (1950)
- The Beautiful Galatea (1950)
- Corinna Schmidt (1951)
- Torreani (1951)
- Holiday From Myself (1952)
- Klettermaxe (1952)
- Fritz and Friederike (1952)
- Captain Bay-Bay (1953)
- Secretly Still and Quiet (1953)
- Diary of a Married Woman (1953)
- Hooray, It's a Boy (1953)
- The Flower of Hawaii (1953)
- Spring Song (1954)
- My Children and I (1955)
- I'll See You at Lake Constance (1956)
- The Heart of St. Pauli (1957)
- The Big Chance (1957)
- Munchhausen in Africa (1958)
- My Ninety Nine Brides (1958)
- Thirteen Old Donkeys (1958)
- The Night Before the Premiere (1959)
- Stage Fright (1960)
- Life Begins at Eight (1962)
- Homesick for St. Pauli (1963)
- Charley's Uncle (1969)
