= Unknown Sender (film) =

1950 film

- Directed by: Ákos Ráthonyi
- Written by: Kurt Bortfeldt; Nikolaus Kadar
- Produced by: Walter Koppel; Gyula Trebitsch
- Starring: Henny Porten; Bruni Löbel; Cornell Borchers
- Cinematography: Willy Winterstein
- Edited by: Alice Ludwig
- Music by: Franz Grothe
- Production company: Real Film
- Distributed by: Allianz Filmverleih
- Release date: 10 February 1950
- Running time: 97 minutes
- Country: West Germany
- Language: German

Unknown Sender (German: Absender unbekannt) is a 1950 West German comedy film directed by Ákos Ráthonyi and starring Henny Porten, Bruni Löbel and Cornell Borchers. It was shot at the Wandsbek Studios in Hamburg. The film's sets were designed by the art director Mathias Matthies.

== Cast ==
- Henny Porten as Direktorin
- Bruni Löbel as Magda Lehmann
- Cornell Borchers as Dr. Elisabeth Markert
- Käthe Haack as Frau Lehmann
- Ursula Herking as Frau Bock
- Marina Ried as Adele
- Hans Richter as Dr. Alfred Braun
- Volker von Collande as Fredy Brown
- Paul Kemp as Schuldiener Bock
- Hubert von Meyerinck as Schmoll, Lehrer
- Rudolf Platte as Lehrer Zirbel
- Albert Florath as Professor Wagner
- Willy Maertens as Herr Lehmann
- Friedl Rostock as Dora
- Ingeborg Körner as Brigitte
- Ann Höling as Edith
- Ilse Zielstorff as Rosemarie
- Katharina von Miculicz-Radesci as Eva
- Petra Unkel as Wilma
- Ilse Gottburg as Claire
- Gustl Busch as Stine
- Änne Bruck as Frau Riedel
- Tilla Hohmann as Bianca Voss
- Elly Burgmer as Frau Braun
- Felicitas Deutsch as Sekretärin
- Wolf Martini as Empfangschef
- Waldemar Radick as Hotelportier
- Aranka Jaenke as Blumenverkäuferin
- Gabriele Donner as Verkäuferin
- Willi Wagner as Verkäufer
- Marga Maasberg as Frau Kroll

== See also ==
- Magda Expelled (1938)
- Maddalena, Zero for Conduct (1940)

== Bibliography ==
- Parish, Robert. Film Actors Guide. Scarecrow Press, 1977.
