= Robert Meyn =

German actor (1896–1972)

- Born: 16 January 1896; Hamburg, German Empire
- Died: 2 March 1972 (aged 76); Hamburg, West Germany
- Occupation: Actor
- Years active: 1951–1972 (film & TV)

Robert Meyn (16 January 1896 – 2 March 1972) was a German stage, film and television actor.

== Partial filmography ==
- The Sinner (1951) - Von Hernsdorf - Marinas Stiefvater / Marina's Stepfather
- Kommen Sie am Ersten (1951) - Dr. Brand
- Klettermaxe (1952) - Reuping, Theaterdirektor
- Captain Bay-Bay (1953) - Zollkommandant
- The Last Bridge (1954) - Stabsartz Dr. Rottsieper
- Three from Variety (1954)
- Ludwig II (1955) - Professor Dr. Gudden
- The Devil's General (1955) - Generalleutnant von Stetten
- Jackboot Mutiny (1955) - (uncredited)
- Island of the Dead (1955) - Kapitän
- Three Girls from the Rhine (1955) - Philipp Drechsler
- In Hamburg When the Nights Are Long (1956)
- Devil in Silk (1956) - Untersuchungsrichter
- Ich suche Dich (1956) - Appel
- The Captain from Köpenick (1956) - Polizeipräsident von Jagow
- Skandal um Dr. Vlimmen (1956) - Stadtrat van der Kalk
- The Story of Anastasia (1956) - Deutscher Rechtsanwalt
- Three Birch Trees on the Heath (1956) - Rackebrand, Forstmeister
- Glücksritter (1957) - Direktor Schomberg
- Confessions of Felix Krull (1957) - 1. Polizeibeamter
- Es wird alles wieder gut (1957)
- Doctor Crippen Lives (1958) - Chefinspektor Smith
- Endangered Girls (1958) - Maulbeck, Kriminalkommissar
- Night Nurse Ingeborg (1958)
- Schmutziger Engel (1958) - Strafverteidiger
- Grabenplatz 17 (1958) - Kriminalrat Sasse
- Blitzmädels an die Front (1958) - General der Flieger
- The Muzzle (1958) - Oberstaatsanwalt
- Thirteen Old Donkeys (1958) - Ess
- Father, Mother and Nine Children (1958)
- The Man Who Sold Himself (1959) - Herr Stückli
- Court Martial (1959) - Admiral Zirler
- The Rest Is Silence (1959) - Dr. Voltman
- Professor Columbus (1968)
- Seven Days Grace (1969) - Direktor
- Hotel Royal (1969, TV film) - Fauvet
- Percy Stuart (1969–1970, TV Series) - Sir John Cleveland
- Heintje – Einmal wird die Sonne wieder scheinen (1970)

== Bibliography ==
- Fehrenbach, Heide. Cinema in Democratizing Germany: Reconstructing National Identity After Hitler. University of North Carolina Press, 1995.
