= Melody of a Great City =

1943 film

- Directed by: Wolfgang Liebeneiner
- Written by: Géza von Cziffra; Maria von der Busche; Else Feldbinder; Wolfgang Liebeneiner
- Produced by: Heinrich Jonen
- Starring: Hilde Krahl; Werner Hinz; Karl John; Paul Henckels
- Cinematography: Richard Angst; Walter Pindter
- Edited by: Marthe Rau
- Music by: Werner Bochmann; Michael Jary; Rudolf Perak
- Production company: Berlin-Film
- Distributed by: Deutsche Filmvertriebs
- Release date: 4 October 1943
- Running time: 107 minutes
- Country: Germany
- Language: German

Melody of a Great City (German: Großstadtmelodie) is a 1943 drama film directed by Wolfgang Liebeneiner and starring Hilde Krahl, Werner Hinz and Karl John. A young woman moves to Berlin to work as a press photographer.

== Cast ==
- Hilde Krahl as Renate Heiberg
- Werner Hinz as Dr. Rolf Bergmann, Berichterstatter
- Karl John as Klaus Nolte
- Paul Henckels as Direktor Heinze, Verlagsleiter
- Will Dohm as Dr. Pauske, Bildredakteur vom Dienst
- Curt Ackermann as Der Direktor der Revue
- Günther Ballier as Ein Berliner an der Strassenbahnhaltestelle
- Heinz Baur as Velten, Mitarbeiter Dr. Werners
- Fritz Berghof as Eine unnahbare ausländische Persönlichkeit
- Elfie Beyer as Vroni Huber, Renates Cousine
- Erwin Biegel as Der Intendant der Revue
- Marlies Bieneck as Lotti Brandt, Dr. Pauskes Sekretärin
- Käte Bierkowsky as Frau Stirner
- Beppo Brem as Geldbriefträger
- Heinz Brilloff as Ein Reporter, der im See baden geht
- Vera Complojer as Frau Moosbrugger
- Gerhard Dammann as Der Lastwagenfahrer
- Ernst Dernburg as Herr Stirner
- Franz Dombrowski as Der Verkehrsschutzmann am Potsdamer Platz
- Liesl Eckardt as Dienstmädchen bei Dr. Pauske
- Josef Eichheim as Alois Huber, Fotograf
- Peter Elsholtz as Buckel, Mitarbeiter Dr. Werners
- Angelo Ferrari as Ein ausländischer Berichterstatter bei der Revue - Probe
- Otto Graf as Dr. Werner, Chefredakteur
- Walter Gross as Ein Berliner an der Strassenbahnhaltestelle
- Wilhelm Große as Der Standesbeamte, der Klaus und Viola traut
- Clemens Hasse as Tielke, Fotolaborant
- Johannes Heesters as Spielt sich selbst in einer Revue
- Friedel Heizmann as Die Schriftleiterin, die Bilder aus Stuttgart sucht
- Irmgard Hoffmann as Frau Tupfer
- Melanie Horeschowsky as Frau Krauthofer, Berliner Pensionsinhaberin
- Ursula Klinder as Frl. Kindler
- Horst Lommer as Der Berliner Bildreporterkollege von Klaus
- Marlise Ludwig as Frau Pauske
- Käte Merk as Eine junge Dame am nächtlichen Würstchenstand
- Kurt Mikulski as Ein Berliner an der Strassenbahnhaltestelle
- Karl Morvilius as Ein Polizeiwachtmeister beim nächtlichen Rundgang
- Peter Mosbacher as Kajetan Orff
- Ditta Oesch as Anni, das Mädchen bei Alois Huber
- Walter Pentzlin as Ein Herr
- Wolfram Pokorny as Ein Reporter, der im See baden geht
- Gustav Püttjer as Ein Schweißarbeiter im nächtlichen Berlin
- Karl Rathgeb as Kiebitz
- Paul Rehkopf as Der alte Flickschuster in Berlin
- Willi Rose as Der Polizist im Tiergarten
- Günter Sabek as Florian, Söhnchen von Frau Tupfer
- Werner Schott as Herr Petersen
- Heinrich Schroth as Alter Herr mit Enkelkind
- Vera Schulz as Das Zimmermädchen der Pension
- Walter Steinweg as Ein Reporter, der im See baden geht
- Ernst Stimmel as Herr Albrecht
- Werner Stock as Heinzelmann, Mitarbeiter Dr. Werners
- Otto Stoeckel as Dr. Springer, Direktor einer Bildagentur
- Gerda Maria Terno as Mutter mit Kind
- Konrad Thoms as Ein Bildreporter bei der Revueprobe
- Rudolf Günther Wagner as Ein Bildreporter bei der Revueprobe
- Franz Weber as Der Direktor einer Fotoagentur
- Inge Weigand as Frl. Gerti von der Berolina-Press
- Hilde Weissner as Frau Hesse, Besitzerin eines Modesalons
- Eduard Wenck as Botenmeister, Portier der Berolina-Press
- Charlotte Witthauer as Eine Telefonistin im Flughafenhotel
- Viola Zarell as Viola, Tänzerin und Revuestar, Verlobte von Klaus Nolte
- Maria Zidek as Die Sekretärin bei Bergmann
- Manon Chafour
- Rolf Jahncke
- Friedrich Maurer
- Otto Mownstaedt
- Erik Radolf
- Just Scheu
- Greta Schröder
- Ewald Wenck
- Bernhard Wosien
