= Klaus Dudenhöfer =

German film editor

- Born: 19 September 1924; Dresden, Germany
- Died: 19 December 2008 (aged 84); Hamburg, Germany
- Occupation: Film editor
- Years active: 1948–2008

Klaus Dudenhöfer (1924–2008) was a German film editor.

== Selected filmography ==
- Nora's Ark (1948)
- Derby (1949)
- Dangerous Guests (1949)
- My Wife's Friends (1949)
- You Have to be Beautiful (1951)
- Under the Thousand Lanterns (1952)
- Fight of the Tertia (1952)
- Don't Forget Love (1953)
- A Woman of Today (1954)
- Columbus Discovers Kraehwinkel (1954)
- Des Teufels General (1955)
- Secrets of the City (1955)
- Request Concert (1955)
- Bambuti (1956)
- The Captain from Köpenick (1956)
- At Green Cockatoo by Night (1957)
- Lemke's Widow (1957)
- The Zurich Engagement (1957)
- The Goose of Sedan (1959)
- Black Gravel (1961)
- Two Among Millions (1961)
- The Transport (1961)
- The House in Montevideo (1963)
- Homesick for St. Pauli (1963)
- Tales of a Young Scamp (1964)
- Sharks on Board (1971)
