= Vera Molnar (actress) =

German actress

- Born: 5 October 1923; Frankfurt, Germany
- Died: 16 March 1986 (aged 62); Rome, Lazio, Italy
- Other name: Vera Kmet
- Occupation: Actress
- Years active: 1949–1986 (film)

Vera Molnar (1923–1986) was a German film actress. Partly of Hungarian descent, she was discovered by the film director Géza von Cziffra who cast her in prominent roles in several of his productions.

== Selected filmography ==
- Dangerous Guests (1949)
- Gabriela (1950)
- Third from the Right (1950)
- The Man in Search of Himself (1950)
- A Tale of Five Cities (1951)
- My Friend the Thief (1951)
- Immortal Melodies (1952)
- The Colourful Dream (1952)
- The Cousin from Nowhere (1953)
- Where Is Freedom? (1954)
- The Confession of Ina Kahr (1954)
- Tight Quarters (1983)

== Bibliography ==
- Goble, Alan. The Complete Index to Literary Sources in Film. Walter de Gruyter, 1999.
