= Ekkehard Kyrath =

German cinematographer

- Born: 20 July 1909; Köslin, Pomerania, German Empire
- Died: 20 January 1962 (aged 52); West Berlin, West Germany
- Occupation: Cinematographer
- Years active: 1939 - 1962 (film)

Ekkehard Kyrath (20 July 1909 – 20 January 1962) was a German cinematographer.

== Biography ==
Ekkehard Kyrath worked for UFA and Terra from 1928 as a camera assistant and simple cameraman. In 1937, he acted as co-cameraman alongside his teacher Günther Rittau in Verklungene Melodie.

After further films with Rittau, the French film Herzdame with Fernandel, made in Berlin, became his first work under sole responsibility. Immediately afterward he was behind the camera for Rittau's first directorial work, Brand im Ozean.

In the following years, Kyrath shot a number of comedies and melodramas. After World War Two he was able to continue his work as a cameraman, several times with Hans Albers as the leading actor. In 1961, Kyrath, who was seriously ill with cancer, had to hand over the camera direction to Karl Löb during the filming of the abortion melodrama I can no longer remain silent.

== Selected filmography ==
- The Curtain Falls (1939)
- The Mondesir Heir (1940)
- Mistress Moon (1941)
- Violanta (1942)
- The War of the Oxen (1943)
- Summer Nights (1944)
- That Was My Life (1944)
- The Time with You (1948)
- Dangerous Guests (1949)
- Don't Play with Love (1949)
- Derby (1949)
- The Reluctant Maharaja (1950)
- The Shadow of Herr Monitor (1950)
- Only One Night (1950)
- Under the Thousand Lanterns (1952)
- Poison in the Zoo (1952)
- Secretly Still and Quiet (1953)
- The Missing Miniature (1954)
- A Life for Do (1954)
- Ten on Every Finger (1954)
- The Telephone Operator (1954)
- Ripening Youth (1955)
- How Do I Become a Film Star? (1955)
- The Heart of St. Pauli (1957)
- The Copper (1958)
- Man in the River (1958)
- Thirteen Old Donkeys (1958)

== Bibliography ==
- Giesen, Rolf. Nazi Propaganda Films: A History and Filmography. McFarland, 2003.
