= Marianne Wischmann =

German actress and voice actress (1921–2009)

- Marianne Wischmann (1958)
- Born: 20 October 1921; Düsseldorf, Weimar Republic
- Died: 6 November 2009 (aged 88); Starnberg, Germany
- Occupation: Film actor
- Years active: 1950–1985

Marianne Wischmann (1921–2009) was a German film and television actress, as well as a renowned voice actress.

== Selected filmography ==
- Third from the Right (1950)
- The Lie (1950)
- Abundance of Life (1950)
- The Shadow of Herr Monitor (1950)
- Miracles Still Happen (1951)
- The White Horse Inn (1952)
- The White Adventure (1952)
- Scandal at the Girls' School (1953)
- I Was an Ugly Girl (1955)
- San Salvatore (1956)
- 24 Hour Lover (1968)
- Malevil (1981)

== Selected works as voice actress ==
=== Television ===
- ALF, German voice-over for Liz Sheridan
- The Nanny, German voice-over for Renée Taylor
- Roseanne, German voice-over for Shelley Winters
- The Muppet Show, German voice-over for Miss Piggy
- Why Didn't They Ask Evans, German voice-over for Joan Hickson

=== Film ===
- Alice Doesn't Live Here Anymore, German voice-over for Ellen Burstyn
- The Ant and the Aardvark, 17 theatrical cartoons (in Germany: television broadcast only), voice-over for the aardvark character
- Hush… Hush, Sweet Charlotte, German voice-over for Olivia de Havilland
- La Dolce Vita, German voice-over for Anita Ekberg
- Medea, German voice-over for Maria Callas
- The Revengers, German voice-over for Susan Hayward
