= Ingeborg Körner =

German actress (born 1929)

- Born: July 27, 1929 (age 96); Keetmanshoop, South Africa (now Namibia)
- Years active: 1949-1973

Ingeborg Körner is a Namibian-born German actress. She is known for her roles in the films Des Lebens Überfluss (1950), Die Rose von Stambul (1953), and Das ideale Brautpaar (1954).

== Selected filmography ==
- Dangerous Guests (1949)
- Unknown Sender (1950)
- Abundance of Life (1950)
- The House in Montevideo (1951)
- Toxi (1952)
- When The Village Music Plays on Sunday Nights (1953)
- Not Afraid of Big Animals (1953)
- The Rose of Stamboul (1953)
- The Perfect Couple (1954)
- My Leopold (1955)
