= Wedding with Erika =

1950 film

- Directed by: Eduard von Borsody
- Written by: Eduard Künneke (operetta); Theo Rausch; Willi Webels (play); Eduard von Borsody
- Produced by: Franz Vogel
- Starring: Marianne Schönauer; Wolfgang Lukschy; Dorit Kreysler
- Cinematography: Oskar Schnirch
- Edited by: Eva Kroll
- Music by: Eduard Künneke
- Production company: Euphono-Film
- Distributed by: Panorama-Film
- Release date: 31 January 1950
- Running time: 88 minutes
- Country: Germany
- Language: German

Wedding with Erika (German: Hochzeit mit Erika) is a 1950 West German musical comedy film directed by Eduard von Borsody and starring Marianne Schönauer, Wolfgang Lukschy and Dorit Kreysler.

The film's sets were designed by the art director Alfred Bütow.

== Cast ==
- Marianne Schönauer as Erika
- Wolfgang Lukschy as Fred
- Dorit Kreysler as Irene
- Hans Holt as Peter
- Charlott Daudert as Emilie
- Kurt Seifert as Baron Kroko
- Carsta Löck as Mathilde
- Erika von Thellmann as Mrs. Horsemeat
- Hans Zesch-Ballot as Colonel Hunter
- Carl Napp as Lukasmann
- Kurt Großkurth as Jakob

== Bibliography ==
- Goble, Alan. The Complete Index to Literary Sources in Film. Walter de Gruyter, 1999.
