= Karl-Heinz Peters =

German actor (1903–1990)

Karl-Heinz Peters (28 August 1903 – 5 September 1990) was a German film actor.

== Selected filmography ==
- Alarm at Station III (1939)
- Men Are That Way (1939)
- The Governor (1939)
- Enemies (1940)
- Mein Leben für Irland (1940)
- Between Hamburg and Haiti (1940)
- The Three Codonas (1940)
- The Fire Devil (1940)
- Commissioner Eyck (1940)
- Bismarck (1940)
- Comrades (1941)
- Much Ado About Nixi (1942)
- Diesel (1942)
- The Dark Day (1943)
- Derby (1949)
- The Prisoner (1949)
- Amico (1949)
- The Girl from the South Seas (1950)
- Only One Night (1950)
- Scandal at the Embassy (1950)
- Harbour Melody (1950)
- Crown Jewels (1950)
- We're Dancing on the Rainbow (1952)
- Cuba Cabana (1952)
- Monks, Girls and Hungarian Soldiers (1952)
- Jonny Saves Nebrador (1953)
- Elephant Fury (1953)
- The Poacher (1953)
- The Missing Miniature (1954)
- The Angel with the Flaming Sword (1954)
- Conchita and the Engineer (1954)
- Island of the Dead (1955)
- All Roads Lead Home (1957)
- Emilia Galotti (1958)
- The Muzzle (1958)
- Tatort Berlin (1958)
- A Woman Who Knows What She Wants (1958)
- The Crimson Circle (1960)
- The Green Archer (1961)
- Hurra, die Schule brennt! (1969)
- Our Doctor is the Best (1969)
- Birdie (1971)
- Soft Shoulders, Sharp Curves (1972)
- Ludwig (1972)
