= Alice Ludwig =

German film editor

- Born: 15 January 1910; Berlin, German Empire
- Died: 2 November 1973 (aged 63); Lütjensee, Schleswig-Holstein; West Germany
- Other names: Alice Ludwig-Rasch; Alice Ludwig Rasch; Alice Rasch
- Occupation: Editor
- Years active: 1932–1973

Alice Ludwig (or Alice Ludwig-Rasch) (15 January 1910 – 2 November 1973) was a German film editor who worked on many films and television series between 1932 and 1973. After first entering the film industry during the Weimar Republic, she worked continuously during the Nazi era. Following the Second World War she edited Marriage in the Shadows (1947), an anti-Nazi work of the rubble film period. Much of her later film work was in popular melodramas such as Gabriela (1950). From the 1960s onwards she switched to working in television, her final employment being the editing over fifty episodes of the crime series Hamburg Transit.

== Selected filmography ==
- Ship Without a Harbour (1932)
- Spell of the Looking Glass (1932)
- Hans Westmar (1933)
- Anna and Elizabeth (1933)
- Last Stop (1935)
- The Valley of Love (1935)
- The Muzzle (1938)
- Midsummer Night's Fire (1939)
- Opera Ball (1939)
- Central Rio (1939)
- Vienna Tales (1940)
- Roses in Tyrol (1940)
- The Swedish Nightingale (1941)
- Rembrandt (1942)
- A Man With Principles? (1943)
- The Eternal Tone (1943)
- Die Fledermaus (1946)
- Marriage in the Shadows (1947)
- Chemistry and Love (1948)
- The Last Night (1949)
- Second Hand Destiny (1949)
- Gabriela (1950)
- Third from the Right (1950)
- Unknown Sender (1950)
- The Man in Search of Himself (1950)
- The Allure of Danger (1950)
- Harbour Melody (1950)
- The Shadow of Herr Monitor (1950)
- Maya of the Seven Veils (1951)
- Woe to Him Who Loves (1951)
- The Dubarry (1951)
- Toxi (1952)
- Dreaming Lips (1953)
- Money from the Air (1954)
- The False Adam (1955)
- Father's Day (1955)
- Bandits of the Autobahn (1955)
- The Heart of St. Pauli (1957)
- Thirteen Old Donkeys (1958)
- Doctor Crippen Lives (1958)
- The Girl from the Marsh Croft (1958)
- Heart Without Mercy (1958)
- The Night Before the Premiere (1959)
- Mrs. Warren's Profession (1960)
- Pension Schöller (1960)
- Pichler's Books Are Not in Order (1961)
- The Happy Years of the Thorwalds (1962)
- The Constant Wife (1962)

== Bibliography ==
- Shandley, Robert. Rubble Films: German Cinema in the Shadow of the Third Reich. Temple University Press, 2010
