= Ursula Herking =

German actress

- Born: 28 January 1912; Dessau, German Empire
- Died: 17 November 1974 (aged 62); Munich, West Germany
- Occupation: Actress
- Years active: 1933–1972

Ursula Herking (28 January 1912 – 17 November 1974) was a German film actress. She appeared in more than 130 films between 1933 and 1972. She was born in Dessau, Germany and died in Munich, West Germany.

== Selected filmography ==
- Susanne in the Bath (1936)
- Stronger Than Regulations (1936)
- Uncle Bräsig (1936)
- The Chief Witness (1937)
- Togger (1937)
- The Grey Lady (1937)
- The Four Companions (1938)
- Red Orchids (1938)
- The Day After the Divorce (1938)
- Twelve Minutes After Midnight (1939)
- Annelie (1941)
- Mistress Moon (1941)
- Goodbye, Franziska (1941)
- A Gust of Wind (1942)
- The Night in Venice (1942)
- Love Me (1942)
- Bravo Acrobat! (1943)
- Beloved Darling (1943)
- A Man With Principles? (1943)
- Nora (1944)
- A Cheerful House (1944)
- The Roedern Affair (1944)
- A Wife for Three Days (1944)
- Thank You, I'm Fine (1948)
- Trouble Backstairs (1949)
- Shadows in the Night (1950)
- Who Drove the Grey Ford? (1950)
- Thirteen Under One Hat (1950)
- Furioso (1950)
- Unknown Sender (1950)
- When a Woman Loves (1950)
- You Have to be Beautiful (1951)
- Shadows Over Naples (1951)
- Love and Blood (1951)
- The Chaste Libertine (1952)
- The Day Before the Wedding (1952)
- Dutch Girl (1953)
- I and You (1953)
- Not Afraid of Big Animals (1953)
- Columbus Discovers Kraehwinkel (1954)
- Ball of Nations (1954)
- Children, Mother, and the General (1955)
- Operation Sleeping Bag (1955)
- The Spanish Fly (1955)
- Special Delivery (1955)
- The Old Forester House (1956)
- A Heart Returns Home (1956)
- Fruit in the Neighbour's Garden (1956)
- The Unexcused Hour (1957)
- As Long as the Heart Still Beats (1958)
- Munchhausen in Africa (1958)
- The Blue Sea and You (1959)
- Pension Schöller (1960)
- I Will Always Be Yours (1960)
- Bankraub in der Rue Latour (1961)
- Tim Frazer (1963, TV Series)
- Girls Behind Bars (1965)
