= Wolfgang Zeller =

German composer

Wolfgang Zeller (12 September 1893 – 11 January 1967) was a German composer noted for his complex film music.

== Life ==
Born in Biesenrode (now part of Mansfeld), Province of Saxony, Kingdom of Prussia, German Empire, Zeller was the son of a vicar. As a child, he studied violin and showed an aptitude for composition. After graduating from high school in Potsdam, Zeller continued studies with violinist Felix Berger in Munich, and with composer Jean Paul Ertel, in Berlin. Zeller fought in the First World War. After being discharged from duty due to an injury, he made a living as a violinist with the Deutsches Opernhaus. Between 1921 and 1929 he was violinist and in-house composer for the Berlin Volksbühne orchestra.

Wolfgang Zeller died in Berlin in 1967.

== Film music ==
His film music career was launched with the orchestral score he composed for The Adventures of Prince Achmed. The animated film created by Lotte Reiniger premiered in Berlin in 1926. The score for Walter Ruttmann's Melodie der Welt, the first full-length German sound film, followed in 1929. During the Third Reich, Zeller wrote music for propaganda films such as Jud Süß (1940) directed by Veit Harlan. After the war, Mr. Zeller continued to work as a film composer and wrote music for anti-fascist films like Marriage in the Shadows (1947). Zeller's last score was for the documentary Serengeti Shall Not Die (1959) by Bernhard Grzimek.

== Selected filmography ==
- The Adventures of Prince Achmed (1926)
- Luther (1928)
- Melody of the World (1928)
- Land Without Women (1929)
- Miss Europe (1930)
- Menschen im Busch (1931)
- Vampyr 1932
- Sacred Waters (1932)
- Die Herrin von Atlantis (1932)
- Insel der Dämonen (1933)
- The King's Prisoner (1935)
- The Man with the Paw (1935)
- The Old and the Young King (1935)
- Ewiger Wald (1936)
- Der Herrscher (1937)
- The Ruler (1937)
- The Broken Jug (1937)
- Ride to Freedom (1937)
- People Who Travel (1938)
- You and I (1938)
- Travelling People (1938)
- Target in the Clouds (1939)
- The Strange Woman (1939)
- Police Report (1939)
- The Governor (1939)
- Robert Koch (1939)
- Jud Süß (1940)
- The Waitress Anna (1941)
- People in the Storm (1941)
- Sky Hounds (1942)
- Andreas Schlüter (1942)
- Immensee (1943)
- The Enchanted Day (1944)
- The Years Pass (1945)
- Marriage in the Shadows (1947)
- The Morgenrot Mine (1948)
- Morituri (1948)
- The Court Concert (1948)
- The Last Night (1949)
- The Murder Trial of Doctor Jordan (1949)
- Where the Trains Go (1949)
- Second Hand Destiny (1949)
- The Lie (1950)
- The Shadow of Herr Monitor (1950)
- Eyes of Love (1951)
- Two People (1952)
- Life Begins at Seventeen (1953)
- Red Roses, Red Lips, Red Wine (1953)
- You Can No Longer Remain Silent (1955)
- A Heart Returns Home (1956)
- My Sixteen Sons (1956)
- Die Landärztin (1958)
- Serengeti Shall Not Die (1959)
