= Eugen York =

German film director (1912–1991)

- Born: 26 November 1912; Rybinsk, Russian Empire
- Died: 18 November 1991 (aged 78); Berlin, Germany
- Occupations: Film director Screenwriter
- Years active: 1938-1984

Eugen York (26 November 1912 – 18 November 1991) was a German film director. He directed 35 films between 1938 and 1984. He was born in Rybinsk, Russian Empire and died in Berlin, Germany.

== Selected filmography ==
=== Film ===
- Morituri (1948)
- The Last Night (1949)
- The Shadow of Herr Monitor (1950)
- Blondes for Export (1950)
- Shadows in the Night (1950)
- The Allure of Danger (1950)
- Das Fräulein von Scuderi (1955)
- A Heart Returns Home (1956)
- The Heart of St. Pauli (1957)
- The Copper (1958)
- Man in the River (1958)
- The Girl with the Cat's Eyes (1958)
- Murderer in the Fog (1964)
- Das Gesetz des Clans (1977)

=== Television ===
- Das Sparschwein (1952)
- Aufruhr (1960) — based on the play Disturbance by Hugh Forbes
- Polly liebt nur Kapitäne (1963)
- Haus der Schönheit (1963) — based on the play Pariser Platz 13 by Vicki Baum
- Gewagtes Spiel (1964–1966, TV series, 26 episodes)
- Sechs Stunden Angst (1964) — based on the novel Six heures d'angoisse by Francis Didelot
- Großer Ring mit Außenschleife (1966) — based on a radio play by Heinz Oskar Wuttig
- Spätsommer (1966) — based on the novel Altersschwach by Max Dreyer
- Das kleine Teehaus (co-director: Paul Martin, 1967) — based on The Teahouse of the August Moon
- Großer Mann was nun? (1967–1968, TV series, 8 episodes)
- Der Tag, an dem die Kinder verschwanden (1967) — based on The Day the Children Vanished by Hugh Pentecost
- Alle Hunde lieben Theobald (1969–1970, TV series, 12 episodes)
- Stewardessen (1969, TV series, 6 episodes)
- Der Opernball (1971) — based on Der Opernball
- Kennzeichen Rosa Nelke (1971, TV series, 6 episodes)
- Ball im Savoy (1971) — based on Ball im Savoy
- Paganini (1973) — based on Paganini
- Gräfin Mariza (1974) — based on Countess Maritza
- Madame Pompadour (1974) — based on Madame Pompadour
- Glückliche Reise (1975) — based on Glückliche Reise
- Viktoria und ihr Husar (1975) — based on Viktoria und ihr Husar
- Frau Luna (1975) — based on Frau Luna
- Hatschi! (1979)
- Und plötzlich bist du draußen (1981)
- Schuld sind nur die Frauen (co-director: Rolf von Sydow, 1982)
- Ein Fall für zwei: Zwielicht (1983, TV series episode)
- Ein Fall für zwei: Herr Pankratz, bitte! (1983, TV series episode)
- Ein Fall für zwei: Chemie eines Mordes (1984, TV series episode)
