= Wolfgang Lukschy =

German actor

- Born: 19 October 1905; Berlin, German Empire
- Died: 10 July 1983 (aged 77); West Berlin, West Germany
- Occupation: Actor
- Years active: 1940–1979

Wolfgang Lukschy (19 October 1905 – 10 July 1983 in Berlin) was a German actor. He performed in theater, film and television.

He made over 75 film and television appearances between 1940 and 1979. Possibly his most noted performances worldwide were his roles as Alfred Jodl in the 1962 American war film The Longest Day and as John Baxter in Sergio Leone's 1964 production A Fistful of Dollars alongside Clint Eastwood and Gian Maria Volonté.

== Selected filmography ==
- Friedrich Schiller - The Triumph of a Genius (1940) – Student Boigeol
- Ohm Krüger (1941) – Junger englischer Offizer am englischen Hof
- Between Heaven and Earth (1942) – Mathias Rottwinkel
- My Summer Companion (1943) – Jochen Binding, Manfreds Freund
- Ich werde dich auf Händen tragen (1943) – Dr. Viktor Büchner
- The Degenhardts (1944)
- The Woman of My Dreams (1944) – Oberingenieur Peter Groll
- Kamerad Hedwig (1945) – Karl Schulz
- Blocked Signals (1948) – Bruno Kalpak
- Das Mädchen Christine (1949) – Merian
- Die Andere (1949) – Dr. Rainer Litten
- Nights on the Nile (1949) – Dr. Robert Dirig – Schriftsteller
- Wedding with Erika (1950) – Fred
- Harbour Melody (1950)- Klaas Jansen
- Erzieherin gesucht (1950) – Gerd Terbrügge
- Veronika the Maid (1951) – Freddy
- Homesick for You (1952) – Georg Weiler
- The Day Before the Wedding (1952) – Dr. Leiden
- Drei, von denen man spricht (1953) – Robert Wiesinger
- Grandstand for General Staff (1953) – Flügeladjutant v. Lützelburg
- Du bist die Welt für mich (1953) – Fritz
- The Country Schoolmaster (1954) – Heinrich Heinsius
- Emil and the Detectives (1954) – Oberwachtmeister Jeschke
- Die Deutschmeister (1955) – Kaiser Wilhelm II
- The Happy Wanderer (1955) – Klaus Hoppe
- Your Life Guards (1955) – Manager
- Rommel's Treasure (1955) – Petersen
- Skandal um Dr. Vlimmen (1956) – Fritz Dacka
- Drayman Henschel (1956) – Georg
- The Zurich Engagement (1957) – Jürgen Kolbe
- Das haut hin (1957) – Carrosa, Löwendompteur
- The Girl from the Marsh Croft (1958) – Per Eric Martinsson
- Forbidden Paradise (1959) – Prof. Wetterstein
- The Night Before the Premiere (1959) – Kriminalkommissar Peter Hall
- Ich schwöre und gelobe (1960) – Chefarzt Dr. Feldhusen
- Until Money Departs You (1960) – Robert Grothe
- Und sowas nennt sich Leben (1961) – Herr Berger
- The Dead Eyes of London (1961) – Stephan Judd
- The Last Chapter (1961) – Bertelsen
- The Longest Day (1962) – Col. Gen. Alfred Jodl (uncredited)
- Sherlock Holmes and the Deadly Necklace (1962) – Peter Blackburn
- Bekenntnisse eines möblierten Herrn (1963) – Alfredo
- Scotland Yard Hunts Dr. Mabuse (1963) – Ernest Hyilard
- A Fistful of Dollars (1964) – Sheriff John Baxter
- Hercules and the Treasure of the Incas (1964) – El Puma
- The Seventh Victim (1964) – Ed Ranova
- Der Fall X701 (1964) – Inspector Prenton
- 24 Hours to Kill (1965) – Kurt Hoffner
- The Dirty Game (1965) – Russian General
- The Hell of Manitoba (1965) – Charly – Barkepper
- Wild Kurdistan (1965) – Ali Bei
- Old Surehand (1965) – Dick Edwards
- Komissar X – Drei Panther (1968) – TV Announcer (voice, uncredited)
- What Is the Matter with Willi? (1970) – Dr. Finz
- Frisch, fromm, fröhlich, frei (1970) – Bülow
- Die Feuerzangenbowle (1970) – Member of the Round table
- Die nackte Gräfin (1971) – Anatol
- The Odessa File (1974) – Sturmbannführer Kranz (uncredited)
- Inside Out (1975) – Reinhard Holtz
- The Expulsion from Paradise (1977) – Guest appearance
- Die Kette (1977, TV Movie) – Tom Dawson

== Gallery ==
Lukschy as John Baxter in A Fistful of Dollars (1964) alongside Clint Eastwood

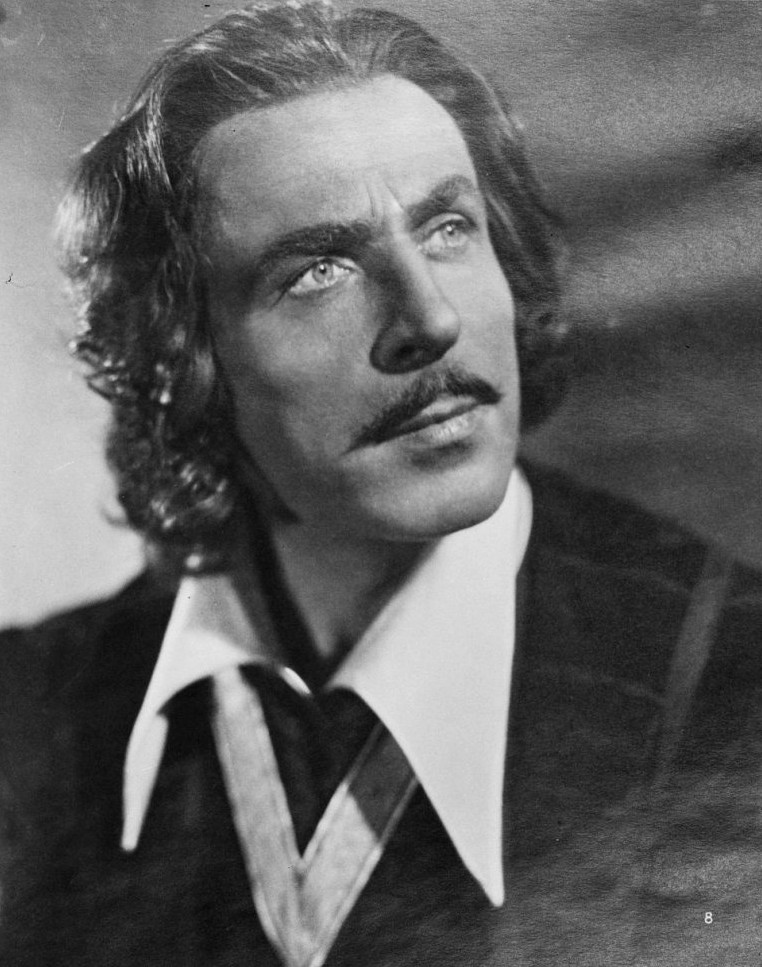
Lukschy in Das Mädchen Christine (1949)

== External links and sources ==
- Wolfgang Lukschy at IMDb
