= The Lie (1950 film) =

1950 film

- Directed by: Gustav Fröhlich
- Written by: Gustav Fröhlich; Martha-Maria Gehrke (novel); Hans Schweikart (novel)
- Produced by: Rolf Meyer
- Starring: Otto Gebühr; Sybille Schmitz; Cornell Borchers
- Cinematography: Hans Schneeberger
- Edited by: Martha Dübber
- Music by: Wolfgang Zeller
- Production company: Junge Film-Union Rolf Meyer
- Distributed by: National-Film
- Release date: 11 August 1950
- Running time: 84 minutes
- Country: West Germany
- Language: German

The Lie (German: Die Lüge) is a 1950 West German crime film directed by Gustav Fröhlich and starring Otto Gebühr, Sybille Schmitz and Cornell Borchers. It was shot at the Bendestorf Studios. Location shooting took place around Hamburg and Westerland. The film's sets were designed by the art director Franz Schroedter.

== Cast ==
- Otto Gebühr as Professor Dr. Ernst A. Gruber
- Sybille Schmitz as Susanne, seine Tochter
- Cornell Borchers as Ellen, seine Tochter
- Ewald Balser as Dr. Thomas Robertsen, Susannes Mann
- Will Quadflieg as Harry Altenberger
- Hans Leibelt as Martin Altenberger, Bankier, Harrys Vater
- Ilse Bally
- Marianne Wischmann
- Walter Franck
- Rolf Moebius
- Hans Paetsch
- Wolfgang Reimers
- Walter Ladengast
- Walter Gebühr

== Bibliography ==
- Bock, Hans-Michael; Bergfelder, Tim, eds. (2009). The Concise Cinegraph: Encyclopaedia of German Cinema. New York: Berghahn Books. ISBN 978-1-57181-655-9.
