= Géza von Cziffra =

Hungarian-Austrian film director and screenwriter (1900–1989)

Géza von Cziffra (Hungarian pronunciation: [ˈɡeːzɒ fon ˈt͡sifrɒ]; 19 December 1900 – 28 April 1989) was a Hungarian and Austrian film director and screenwriter.

== Life ==
Cziffra was a Banat German in origin, born in 1900 in Arad in the Banat region, at that date in the Kingdom of Hungary, now in Romania.

Cziffra made films from the 1930s onwards, at first in Hungary, and from 1936 in Germany as well, where he was initially more active as a screenwriter.

In 1945, in Prague, then occupied by the Germans, he made the film Leuchtende Schatten ("Glowing Shadows"). As adviser for the criminal police, he was assigned SS-Sturmbannführer Eweler, a member of the SD and brother of the actress Ruth Eweler. After some time, Cziffra banned Eweler from the studios for excessive and obstructive criticism. Shortly afterwards, he was arrested and taken to the Prague Gestapo Headquarters in the Pecec Palace, where he was accused of having eaten several times in the Czech restaurant "Neumann" without using ration stamps. He was eventually dispatched to Pankrác Prison, the remand and interrogation prison of Prague, and sentenced to six months' imprisonment, beginning on 12 February. He was released from detention on 19 April, shortly before the end of the war.

In 1945, in Vienna, Cziffra founded the first post-war Austrian film production company: Cziffra-Film.

Principally, and for preference, he made light entertainment and musical films, with well-known German and Austrian actors such as Peter Alexander, Rudolf Platte, Senta Berger and Hubert von Meyerinck. Through the input of musicians like Bill Ramsey or Bully Buhlan, the films mostly progressed to being musical revues with a local Austrian slant and flavour (Heimatfilme). Cziffra also worked as an actor himself, and later in his life published a number of books.

He was married to the actress Ursula Justin, who starred in six of his films in the 1950s.

He died on 28 April 1989 in Diessen am Ammersee in Bavaria. His remains are interred in the crematorium in the Ostfriedhof, Munich.

== Selected filmography ==
- Gulliver's Travels (screenplay and direction, 1924)
- The Copper (screenplay and assistance with direction, 1930), with Hans Albers
- Three Days Confined to Barracks (screenplay, 1930)
- Everything for the Woman (1934)
- A Night in Venice (1934)
- Villa for Sale (screenplay, 1935)
- Ball at the Savoy (screenplay, 1935)
- Where the Lark Sings (screenplay, 1936)
- St. Peter's Umbrella (1936)
- The Man Under the Bridge (screenplay, 1936)
- The Vagabonds (screenplay, 1937)
- The Green Emperor (1939)
- The Life and Loves of Tschaikovsky (screenplay, 1939), with Zarah Leander and Marika Rökk
- Melody of a Great City (screenplay, 1943)
- Love Premiere (screenplay, 1943)
- Women Are No Angels (screenplay, 1943)
- The White Dream (1943)
- Dog Days (1944)
- The Wedding Hotel (screenplay, 1944)
- Liebe nach Noten (1945), with Rudolf Prack and Sonja Ziemann
- The Immortal Face (1947), with O. W. Fischer
- The Queen of the Landstrasse (1948)
- The Heavenly Waltz (1948)
- Lambert Feels Threatened (1949)
- Dangerous Guests (1949)
- Gabriela (1950), with Zarah Leander
- Third from the Right (1950)
- The Man in Search of Himself (1950)
- A Tale of Five Cities (Anthology film, 1951)
- Maya of the Seven Veils (1951)
- The Colourful Dream (1952)
- The Singing Hotel (1953)
- The Flower of Hawaii (1953)
- Money from the Air (1954)
- The False Adam (1955)
- Bandits of the Autobahn (1955)
- The Stolen Trousers (1956)
- Aunt Wanda from Uganda (1957), with Grethe Weiser
- The Legs of Dolores (1957)
- Night Nurse Ingeborg (1958)
- So ein Millionär hat's schwer (1958), with Peter Alexander and Heinz Erhardt
- Peter Shoots Down the Bird (1959)
- Crime Tango (1960), with Peter Alexander
- The Adventures of Count Bobby (1961), with Peter Alexander
- Junge Leute brauchen Liebe (1961), with Cornelia Froboess and Johannes Heesters
- Kauf dir einen bunten Luftballon (1961)
- Die Fledermaus (1962), with Peter Alexander, Marika Rökk and Hans Moser
- The Bird Seller (1962), with Cornelia Froboess
- The Phone Rings Every Night (1962), with Elke Sommer
- The Sweet Life of Count Bobby (1962)
- Charley's Aunt (1963), with Peter Alexander
- Lana, Queen of the Amazons (1964)
- Stolen Heaven (1974)
- Dschungelmädchen für zwei Halunken (1974)

== Awards ==
- 1975: Goldenes Ehrenzeichen der Stadt Wien
- 1976: Austrian Decoration for Science and Art
- 1985: Filmband in Gold for long and excellent work in the German film industry

== Selected bibliography ==
- Tanja und ihre vierzig Männer. Ein Roman. Wancura-Verlag, Vienna 1957
- Kauf dir einen bunten Luftballon. Erinnerungen an Götter und Halbgötter. Herbig, Munich 1975, ISBN 3-7766-0708-4
- Immer waren es die Frauen ... Eine intime Zeitgeschichte. Herbig, Munich 1976, ISBN 3-7766-0784-X
- Das Beste aus meiner Witze- und Anekdotensammlung vom Film. Heyne, Munich 1977, ISBN 3-453-00739-5
- Hanussen. Hellseher des Teufels. Die Wahrheit über den Reichstagsbrand. Herbig, Munich 1978, ISBN 3-7766-0879-X
- Tango. Roman einer Berliner Familie. Herbig, Munich 1980, ISBN 3-7766-0946-X
- Der Kuh im Kaffeehaus. Die goldenen Zwanziger in Anekdoten. Herbig, Munich 1981, ISBN 3-7766-1147-2
- Der heilige Trinker (über Joseph Roth). Lübbe, Bergisch Gladbach 1983, ISBN 3-404-10215-0
- Es war eine rauschende Ballnacht. Eine Sittengeschichte des deutschen Films. Herbig, Munich 1985, ISBN 3-7766-1341-6
- Im Wartesaal des Ruhms. Begegnungen mit berühmten Persönlichkeiten wie Bert Brecht, Albert Einstein, Erich Kästner u.a. (= Bastei Lübbe Allgemeine Reihe, Band 10660). Lübbe, Bergisch Gladbach 1985, ISBN 3-404-10660-1
- Dr Martin Ottler, Mitläufer. Roman (= Lambda-Dossier, No. 3). Lambda-Edition, Hamburg 1988, ISBN 3-925495-25-8
- Ungelogen. Erinnerungen an mein Jahrhundert (Autobiographie). Herbig, Munich 1988, ISBN 3-7766-1500-1
