= Walter Koppel =

German film producer (1906–1982)

- Born: 23 April 1906; Cologne, German Empire
- Died: 25 October 1982 (aged 76); Marburg, West Germany
- Occupation: Producer
- Years active: 1948-1971 (film)

Walter Koppel (April 23, 1906 – October 25, 1982) was a German film producer. He was nominated in 1956 for the Academy Award for Best Foreign Language Film along with Gyula Trebitsch for their film The Captain of Kopenick. In 1947 he founded with Gyula Trebitsch the Hamburg-based studio Real Film.

== Selected filmography ==
- Nora's Ark (1948)
- The Last Night (1949)
- Derby (1949)
- Second Hand Destiny (1949)
- Dangerous Guests (1949)
- Third from the Right (1950)
- The Allure of Danger (1950)
- Abundance of Life (1950)
- Harbour Melody (1950)
- Unknown Sender (1950)
- Gabriela (1950)
- The Shadow of Herr Monitor (1950)
- You Have to be Beautiful (1951)
- Under the Thousand Lanterns (1952)
- Life Begins at Seventeen (1953)
- Not Afraid of Big Animals (1953)
- Columbus Discovers Kraehwinkel (1954)
- Secrets of the City (1955)
- Operation Sleeping Bag (1955)
- Three Birch Trees on the Heath (1956)
- A Heart Returns Home (1956)
- The Captain of Kopenick (1956)
- The Heart of St. Pauli (1957)
- Thirteen Old Donkeys (1958)
- Restless Night (1958)
- Doctor Crippen Lives (1958)
- Pension Schöller (1960)
- The Woman by the Dark Window (1960)
- Beloved Impostor (1961)
- Pichler's Books Are Not in Order (1961)
- Redhead (1962)
- Jailbreak in Hamburg (1971)
