= Gyula Trebitsch =

German film producer

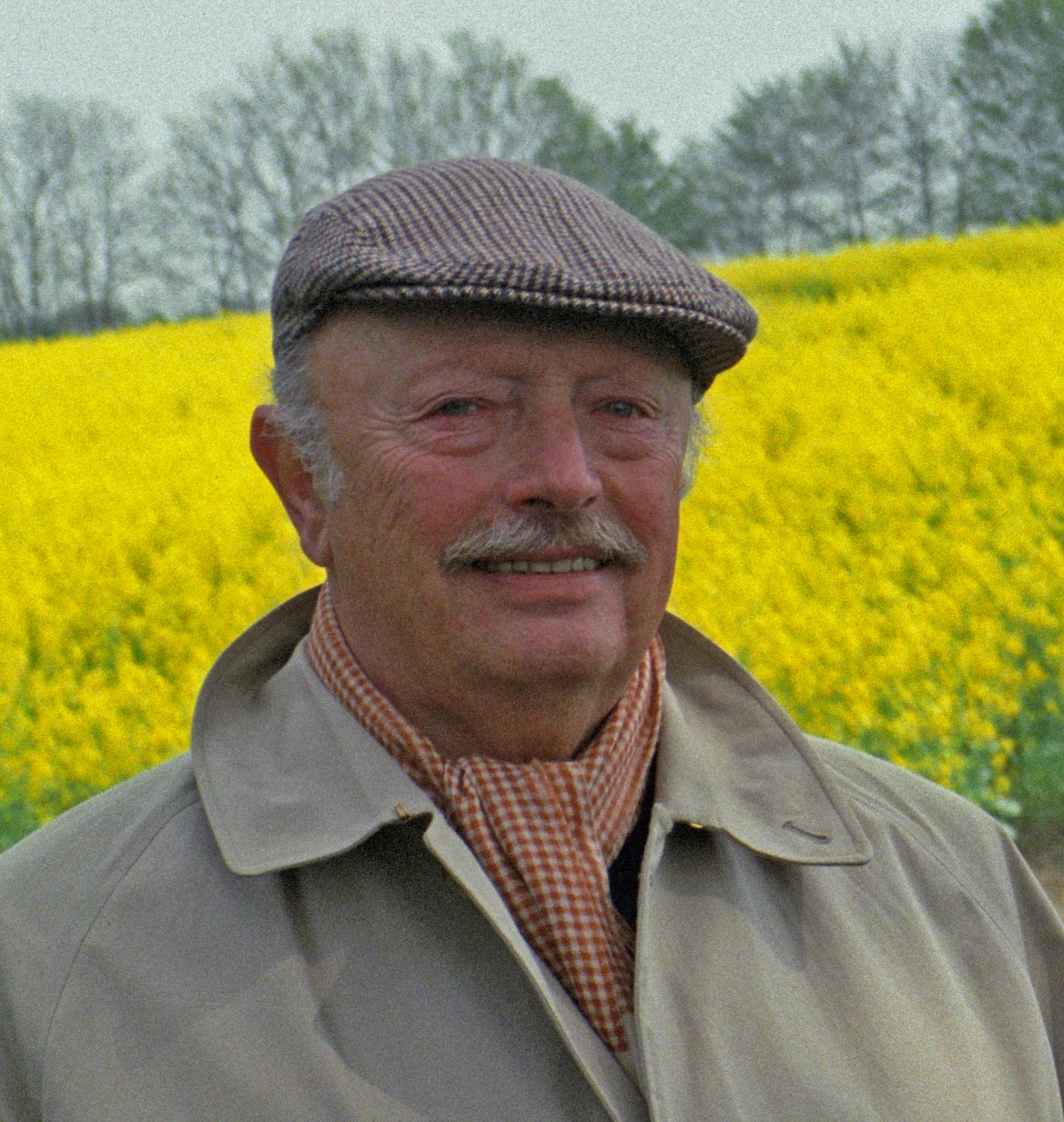
- Gyula Trebitsch in 1985
- Born: 3 November 1914; Budapest, Austro-Hungarian Empire
- Died: 12 December 2005 (aged 91); Hamburg, Germany
- Occupations: Producer, production manager
- Years active: 1937–1992 (film & TV)

Gyula Trebitsch (3 November 1914 – 12 December 2005) was a German film producer born in Budapest, Hungary. He was nominated in 1956 for the Academy Award for Best Foreign Language Film along with Walter Koppel for their film The Captain of Kopenick.

Along with Walter Koppel he founded the Hamburg-based studio Real Film in 1947.

== Selected filmography ==
- Tokay Rhapsody (1937)
- Derby (1949)
- Second Hand Destiny (1949)
- My Wife's Friends (1949)
- The Last Night (1949)
- Gabriela (1950)
- Third from the Right (1950)
- The Allure of Danger (1950)
- The Shadow of Herr Monitor (1950)
- Unknown Sender (1950)
- Abundance of Life (1950)
- Woe to Him Who Loves (1951)
- You Have to be Beautiful (1951)
- Under the Thousand Lanterns (1952)
- Not Afraid of Big Animals (1953)
- Secrets of the City (1955)
- Operation Sleeping Bag (1955)
- A Heart Returns Home (1956)
- Three Birch Trees on the Heath (1956)
- The Captain of Kopenick (1956)
- The Zurich Engagement (1957)
- At the Green Cockatoo by Night (1957)
- The Heart of St. Pauli (1957)
- Thirteen Old Donkeys (1958)
- Restless Night (1958)
- Doctor Crippen Lives (1958)
- Heart Without Mercy (1958)
- The Night Before the Premiere (1959)
- Pension Schöller (1960)
- The Woman by the Dark Window (1960)
- Beloved Impostor (1961)

== Awards ==
- 1983: Golden Camera
- 1992: Hamburg Citizen's Award of the CDU Hamburg (he was member of the SPD)
- 1997: Telestar Special Award for Lifetime Achievement
- 2000: Honorary Award of the German Film for Lifetime Achievement
