= Herbert Kirchhoff =

German art director (1911–1988)

- Born: 5 May 1911; Brunswick, German Empire
- Died: 24 September 1988 (aged 77); Malcesine, Italy
- Occupation: Art director
- Years active: 1945-1986

Herbert Kirchhoff (1911–1988) was a German art director.

== Selected filmography ==
- Nora's Ark (1948)
- My Wife's Friends (1949)
- The Last Night (1949)
- Second Hand Destiny (1949)
- Third from the Right (1950)
- Harbour Melody (1950)
- The Man in Search of Himself (1950)
- Maya of the Seven Veils (1951)
- Woe to Him Who Loves (1951)
- Poison in the Zoo (1952)
- Dancing Stars (1952)
- Under the Thousand Lanterns (1952)
- The Singing Hotel (1953)
- Not Afraid of Big Animals (1953)
- The Flower of Hawaii (1953)
- Dancing in the Sun (1954)
- Money from the Air (1954)
- Columbus Discovers Kraehwinkel (1954)
- How Do I Become a Film Star? (1955)
- Operation Sleeping Bag (1955)
- Secrets of the City (1955)
- Ball at the Savoy (1955)
- The False Adam (1955)
- Music in the Blood (1955)
- A Heart Returns Home (1956)
- Between Time and Eternity (1956)
- Heart Without Mercy (1958)
- The Woman by the Dark Window (1960)
- Pension Schöller (1960)
- Beloved Impostor (1961)
- Pichler's Books Are Not in Order (1961)
- The Constant Wife (1962)

== Bibliography ==
- Bergfelder, Tim. International Adventures: German Popular Cinema and European Co-Productions in the 1960s. Berghahn Books, 2005.
