= Joseph Offenbach =

German actor

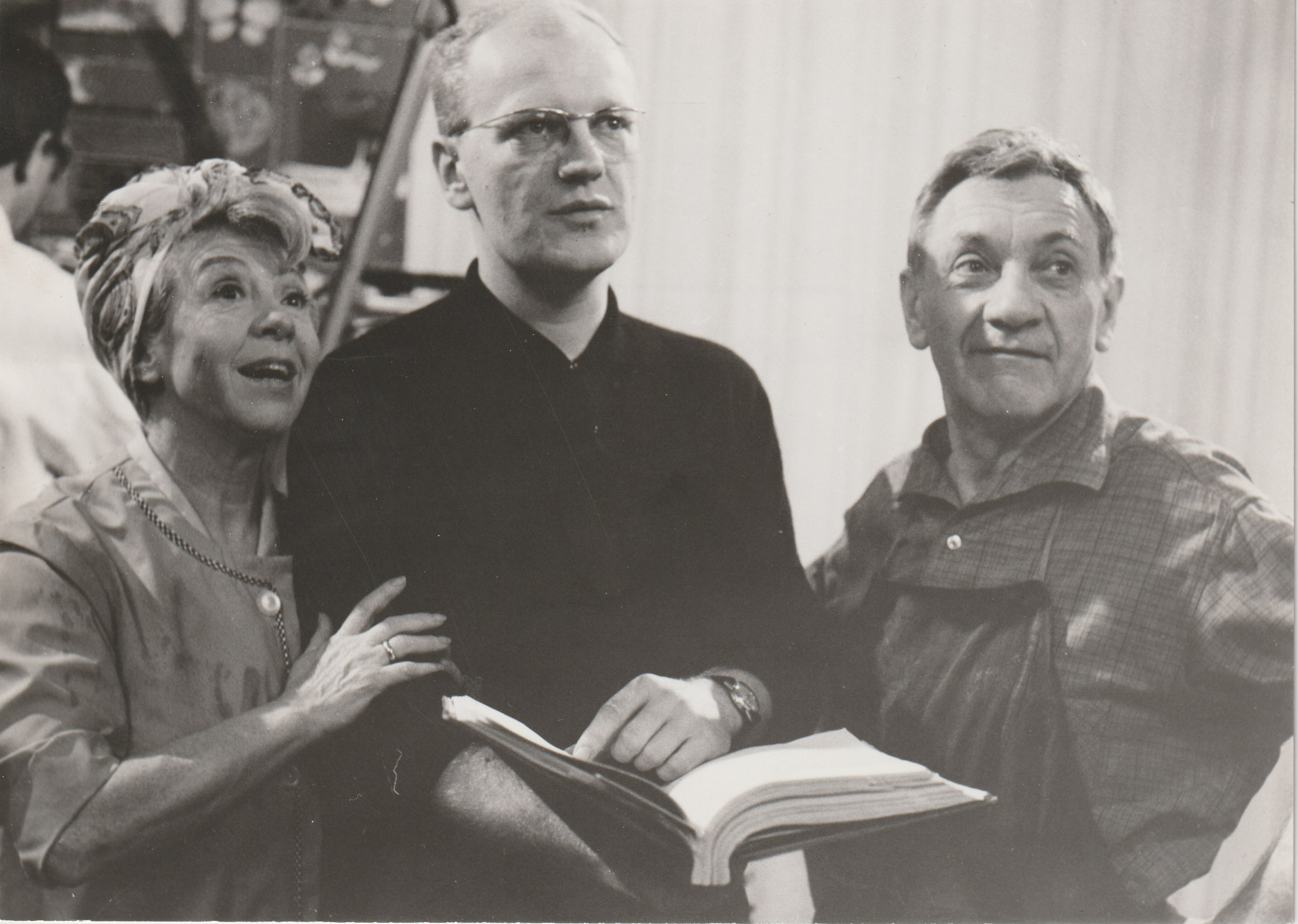
- Joseph Offenbach, right
- Born: 28 December 1904; Offenbach am Main, German Empire
- Died: 15 October 1971 (aged 66); Darmstadt, West Germany
- Occupation: Actor
- Years active: 1942-1969

Joseph Offenbach (born Joseph Ziegler; 28 December 1904 – 15 October 1971) was a German actor. He appeared in more than one hundred films from 1942 to 1969.

== Selected filmography ==
Year	Title	Role	Notes
1971	The Captain		
1971	The Eddie Chapman Story		TV film
1970	Under the Roofs of St. Pauli		
1965	4 Schlüssel		
1964	Condemned to Sin		
1963	Homesick for St. Pauli		
1961	Via Mala		
1961	The Liar		
1961	Pichler's Books Are Not in Order		
1961	Freddy and the Millionaire		
1961	The Forger of London		
1961	The Dead Eyes of London		
1960	The Ambassador		
1959	Der Schinderhannes		
1958	Thirteen Old Donkeys		
1958	The Girl from the Marsh Croft		
1958	Man in the River		
1957	Love from Paris		
1957	Tired Theodore		
1957	Queen Louise		
1957	At the Green Cockatoo by Night		
1956	The Captain from Köpenick		
1956	The Trapp Family		
1955	Des Teufels General		
1955	Ingrid – Die Geschichte eines Fotomodells		
1954	Canaris		
1953	The Flower of Hawaii		
1952	Under the Thousand Lanterns		
1951	You Have to be Beautiful		
1950	Chased by the Devil		
1950	Regimental Music		
1950	The Shadow of Herr Monitor		
1949	Derby		
1947	The Millionaire		
1944	I Need You		
1943	The Endless Road		
1943	Journey into the Past		
1942	To Be God One Time		
