= Wandsbek Studios =

Film studios in Hamburg, Germany

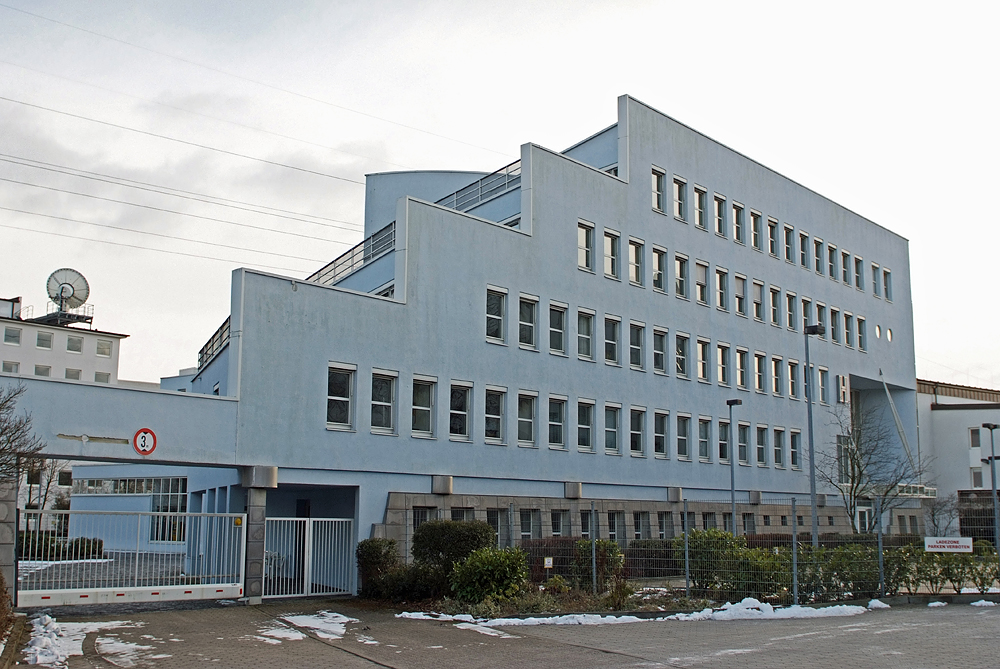

The Wandsbek Studios are film production and television studios located in Wandsbek, a district of the German city of Hamburg.

The complex was established in 1948 when Real Film, set up the previous year, acquired a site in Wandsbek for construction of a studio. Real Film was one of the first German companies to receive a production licence in the wake of the Second World War. The studios were located in the British Zone of Occupation which in 1949 became part of West Germany.

Historically the film industry had been centered in Berlin, but as much of this was now under Communist East German control, West German production shifted to Hamburg and the Bavaria Studios in Munich. While Wandsbek was primarily the base of Real Film, it also rented out space to other companies for their productions, such as the 1952 hit Toxi (1952).

Real Film was a leading film producer of popular cinema during the 1950s producing films such as The Captain from Köpenick (1956). However, the company struggled during the 1960s and was overtaken by outfits such as Constantin Film. In 1961, it was renamed Studio Hamburg and branched increasingly into television production. It was involved in the Pinewood Studio Berlin partnership.

A wholly owned subsidiary is Letterbox Filmproduktion GmbH, under whose name television series such as Notruf Hafenkante, Großstadtrevier, Die Pfefferkörner and Die Kanzlei are produced.

== Bibliography ==
- Davidson, John & Hake, Sabine. Framing the Fifties: Cinema in a Divided Germany. Berghahn Books, 2007.
- Fenner, Angelica. Race Under Reconstruction in German Cinema: Robert Stemmle's Toxi. University of Toronto Press, 2011.
