= Real Film =

German film company

Real Film or Real-Film was a West German film production company. It was established in 1947 in Hamburg, then part of the British Zone of Occupation. Its founders were Walter Koppel and the Hungarian Gyula Trebitsch. The company released some rubble films but gradually switched to concentrate on comedies and musicals. In 1948 an estate in Wandsbek was acquired and developed into a modern film studio, with space sometimes rented out to other companies. The company became a stable and economically successful producer in the 1950s.

In the 1960s the studio was increasingly used for television production, and Real-Film went out of business by 1965.

== Bibliography ==
- Davidson, John & Hake, Sabine. Framing the Fifties: Cinema in a Divided Germany. Berghahn Books, 2007.
- Fenner, Angelica. Race Under Reconstruction in German Cinema: Robert Stemmle's Toxi. University of Toronto Press, 2011.
