= The Forger =

The Forger may refer to:

== Books ==
- The Forger (1927 novel), a crime novel by Edgar Wallace
- The Forger, a 2004 book about Cioma Schönhaus, who was responsible for forging hundreds of identity documents to help Jews survive World War II
- The Forger (Watkins novel), a 2000 publication by Paul Watkins

== Films ==
- The Forger (1928 film), a silent film adaptation directed by G.B. Samuelson
- The Forger of London (1960) German Edgar Wallace film directed by Harald Reinl
- The Forger (2011 film), a drama directed by Lawrence Roeck
- The Forger (2014 film), a crime thriller directed by Philip Martin
- The Forger (2022 film), about a Jewish forger in Nazi Berlin
