= I Will Always Be Yours =

1960 film

- Directed by: Arno Assmann
- Written by: Fritz Böttger; Gina Falckenberg
- Produced by: Franz Wagner
- Starring: Heidi Brühl; Hans Söhnker; Helmuth Lohner
- Cinematography: Kurt Hasse
- Edited by: Adolf Schlyssleder
- Music by: Charly Niessen
- Production company: Bavaria Film
- Distributed by: Bavaria Film
- Release date: 16 December 1960
- Running time: 96 minutes
- Country: West Germany
- Language: German

I Will Always Be Yours (German: Immer will ich dir gehören) is a 1960 West German musical comedy film directed by Arno Assmann and starring Heidi Brühl, Hans Söhnker and Helmuth Lohner. it was shot at the Bavaria Studios in Munich. The film's sets were designed by the art director Rolf Zehetbauer.

== Synopsis ==
In order to fund her studies at university Marianne seeks some work but struggles to find employment at first. Finally he uncle comes to her assistance and due to a mix-up she ends up with two jobs at a car car showroom, one working at night as a garage employee and the second in the day as a glamorous saleswoman.

== Cast ==
- Heidi Brühl as Marianne Seibold
- Hans Söhnker as Heinrich Horstmann
- Helmuth Lohner as Klaus Stettner
- Peter Weck as Bob Lindner
- Heinrich Gretler as Moosgruber
- Hannelore Bollmann as Dinah
- Ursula Herking as Fräulein Behrend
- Klaus Havenstein as Maurer
- Trude Herr as Frieda Bollinger
- Edith Mill as Die Dame
- Fritz Böttger as Herr Blücher
- Heino Hallhuber as Ralf
- Jürgen Feindt as Fritz
- Alwy Becker as Edith
- Claus Herwig as Walter
- Hans Jürgen Diedrich as Gustav
- Ina Duscha as Inge
- Ditmar Christensen as Helmut
- Gisela Kraus as Hilde
- Heidi Fischer as Gaby
- Margrit Nefen as Mrs. Hastings

== Bibliography ==
- Bock, Hans-Michael & Bergfelder, Tim. The Concise CineGraph. Encyclopedia of German Cinema. Berghahn Books, 2009.
