= Film Without a Title =

1948 film directed by Rudolf Jugert

- Directed by: Rudolf Jugert
- Written by: Helmut Käutner; Rudolf Jugert; Ellen Fechner
- Produced by: Helmut Käutner; Erwin Gitt
- Starring: Hans Söhnker; Hildegard Knef; Irene von Meyendorff
- Cinematography: Igor Oberberg
- Edited by: Luise Dreyer-Sachsenberg; Wolfgang Wehrum
- Production companies: Bavaria Film; Camera-Filmproduktion
- Distributed by: Herzog Filmverleih; Sovexport Film
- Release date: 23 January 1948
- Running time: 99 minutes
- Country: Germany
- Language: German

Film Without a Title (German: Film ohne Titel) is a 1948 German comedy film directed by Rudolf Jugert and starring Hans Söhnker, Hildegard Knef and Irene von Meyendorff. It was made by Bavaria Film at the Emelka Studios in Munich in the American Zone of Occupation. Location shooting took place around Lüchow-Dannenberg in Lower Saxony. The film's sets were designed by the art directors Robert Herlth and Max Seefelder.

== Synopsis ==
Actor Willy Fritsch is due to star in a new film. However, the actor, the screenwriter and the film director argue over the content of the production. Although they want to make a comedy, they are unsure how appropriate that is in the wake of the Second World War. As they discuss this, the screenwriter relates the story of two acquaintances of his, the farmer's daughter Christine and the art dealer Martin. Gradually their relationship becomes the subject of the film.

== Cast ==
- Hans Söhnker as Martin Delius
- Hildegard Knef as Christine Fleming
- Irene von Meyendorff as Angelika Rösch
- Erich Ponto as Herr Schichtholz
- Carl Voscherau as Bauer Fleming
- Carsta Löck as Frau Schichtholz
- Fritz Wagner as Jochen Fleming
- Käte Pontow as Helene
- Willy Fritsch as himself (Actor)
- Fritz Odemar as Screenwriter
- Peter Hamel as himself (Director)
- Annemarie Holtz as Viktoria Luise Winkler
- Hildegard Grethe as Bäuerin Fleming
- Margarete Haagen as Haushälterin Emma
- Werner Finck as Hubert
- Nicolas Koline as Kaminsky
- Hannes Brackebusch as Geheimrat Pöschmann
- Bum Krüger as Dancke
- Auguste Hansen-Kleinmichel as Frau Quandt
- Lilo Hauer as Erica Quandt
- Rudolf Helten as Jünemann
- Elly Klippe as Frau Wenndorf
- Bertha Picard as Frau Pöschmann
- Walter Pose as Heimkehrer
- Arnold Risch as Gendarm

== Bibliography ==
- Shandley, Robert R. Rubble Films: German Cinema in the Shadow of the Third Reich. Temple University Press, 2001.
