= Heinz Klevenow =

German actor

Heinz Klevenow (8 November 1908, Hildesheim–27 January 1975, Hamburg) was a German actor.

== Selected filmography ==
- Love '47 (1949)
- Second Hand Destiny (1949)
- Klettermaxe (1952)
- The Bogeyman (1953)
- Confessions of Felix Krull (1957)
- Made in Germany (1957)
- The Crimson Circle (1960)
- The Forger of London (1961)
- Murder Party (1961)
