= Walter Bechmann =

German actor

- Born: 13 July 1887; Blankenburg, Saxony-Anhalt, German Empire
- Died: 3 May 1967 (aged 79); West Berlin, West Germany
- Occupation: Actor
- Years active: 1935-1952 (film)

Walter Bechmann (1887 – 1967) was a German film and stage actor. He played supporting roles in German cinema during the 1930s and 1940s. He appeared in the rubble film The Berliner in 1948. After the war he focused increasingly on stage production in Berlin.

== Selected filmography ==
- An Ideal Husband (1935)
- The Night With the Emperor (1936)
- The Irresistible Man (1937)
- Alarm in Peking (1937)
- Togger (1937)
- Secret Mission (1938)
- Shoulder Arms (1939)
- Men Are That Way (1939)
- Alarm at Station III (1939)
- Twelve Minutes After Midnight (1939)
- Robert Koch (1939)
- Twelve Minutes After Midnight (1939)
- Kitty and the World Conference (1939)
- Wunschkonzert (1940)
- Counterfeiters (1940)
- The Unfaithful Eckehart (1940)
- The Swedish Nightingale (1941)
- Six Days of Leave (1941)
- My Wife Theresa (1942)
- The Thing About Styx (1942)
- I Entrust My Wife to You (1943)
- Romance in a Minor Key (1943)
- The Degenhardts (1944)
- A Wife for Three Days (1944)
- The Years Pass (1945)
- Das Mädchen Juanita (1945)
- King of Hearts (1947)
- The Berliner (1948)
- The Court Concert (1948)
- The Beaver Coat (1949)
- Die Jungen vom Kranichsee (1950)
- All Clues Lead to Berlin (1952)

== Bibliography ==
- Davies, Cecil. The Volksbuhne Movement: A History. Taylor & Francis, 2013.
- Shandley, Robert R. Rubble Films: German Cinema in the Shadow of the Third Reich. Temple University Press, 2001.
