= Crime After School (1959 film) =

- Directed by: Alfred Vohrer
- Written by: Walter Ebert (novel); Harald G. Petersson
- Produced by: Josef Wolf
- Starring: Peter van Eyck; Christian Wolff; Heidi Brühl
- Cinematography: Kurt Hasse
- Edited by: Ira Oberberg
- Music by: Ernst Simon
- Production company: Ultra Film
- Distributed by: Europa-Filmverleih
- Release date: 24 June 1959
- Running time: 106 minutes
- Country: West Germany
- Language: German

Crime After School (German: Verbrechen nach Schulschluß) is a 1959 West German drama film directed by Alfred Vohrer and starring Peter van Eyck, Christian Wolff and Heidi Brühl. It was based on a novel by Walter Ebert.

The film's sets were designed by the art directors Ellen Schmidt and Mathias Matthies. It was shot at the Wandsbek Studios in Hamburg.

Alfred Vohrer's 1975 film with the same title is not a remake.

== Cast ==
- Peter van Eyck as Dr. Knittel
- Christian Wolff as Fabian König
- Heidi Brühl as Ulla Anders
- Corny Collins as Viola von Eikelberg
- Erica Beer as Erna Kallies
- Alice Treff as Frau König
- Elsa Wagner as Frau Teichen
- Ingrid van Bergen as Königs Hausmädchen
- Richard Münch as Oberst Dr. König
- Bum Krüger as 1. Gerichtsdiener Willi Störtebecker
- Joseph Offenbach as 2. Gerichtsdiener Hein
- Günther Jerschke as Defense lawyer Dr. Baumriss
- Claus Wilcke as Günther 'Bimbo' Steppe
- Wolfgang Koch as Joachim 'Teddy' von Eikelberg
- Jörg Holmer as Jürgen Richter
- Walter Clemens as Horst Bregulla

== Bibliography ==
- Bock, Hans-Michael & Bergfelder, Tim. The Concise CineGraph. Encyclopedia of German Cinema. Berghahn Books, 2009.
- Goble, Alan. The Complete Index to Literary Sources in Film. Walter de Gruyter, 1999.
