= Karin Jacobsen =

German actress and screenwriter (1924–1989)

- Born: 14 March 1924; Düren, Germany
- Died: 19 September 1989 (aged 65); Nußdorf am Inn, Bavaria, West Germany
- Occupations: Writer; Actress
- Years active: 1949–1979 (film & TV)

Karin Jacobsen (1924–1989) was a German actress and screenwriter. She was married to the actor Carl-Heinz Schroth and the film producer Gero Wecker.

== Selected filmography ==
- Artists' Blood (1949)
- Furioso (1950)
- Weekend in Paradise (1952)
- Men at a Dangerous Age (1954)
- The Telephone Operator (1954)
- The Bordello (1971)

== Bibliography ==
- Baer, Hester. Dismantling the Dream Factory: Gender, German Cinema, and the Postwar Quest for a New Film Language. Berghahn Books, 2012.
