= Goodbye, Franziska (1941 film) =

1941 film directed by Helmut Käutner

- Marianne Hoppe in a scene from the film.
- Directed by: Helmut Käutner
- Written by: Curt J. Braun; Helmut Käutner
- Produced by: Hans Tost
- Starring: Marianne Hoppe; Hans Söhnker; Fritz Odemar; Rudolf Fernau
- Cinematography: Jan Roth
- Edited by: Helmuth Schönnenbeck
- Music by: Michael Jary
- Distributed by: Terra Film
- Release date: 24 April 1941
- Running time: 89 minutes
- Country: Germany
- Language: German

Goodbye, Franziska (German: Auf Wiedersehn, Franziska!) is a 1941 German romance film directed by Helmut Käutner and starring Marianne Hoppe, Hans Söhnker and Fritz Odemar. It portrays the relationship between a globetrotting reporter and his devoted wife. The film was remade in 1957.

After World War II, the Allied Forces banned the film from being shown in the German-occupied area because of its ending, which reminded the viewers to support the war effort. Director Käutner was eventually able to convince officials that the propaganda sequence was in no way a reflection of his political ideology and was added at the behest of Nazi censors. The remainder of the film was fairly apolitical, and, as such, it was brought back in circulation a few years later; the propaganda end sequence is not seen on current prints of the film.

It was shot at the Tempelhof Studios.

== Synopsis ==
Reisiger travels over the world, in search of news stories. He meets and marries Franziska, after her pregnancy, but continues to leave her. One colleague, dying, tells him to go home, and he returns. When World War II breaks out, he must leave again for war but is reluctant. Franziska urges it on him, reminding him that he managed for many years, and this is more important. She sees him off at the railway station among many wives seeing of their husbands.

== Cast ==
- Marianne Hoppe as Franziska Tiemann
- Hans Söhnker as Michael Reisiger
- Fritz Odemar as Professor Tiemann
- Rudolf Fernau as Dr. Christoph Leitner
- Hermann Speelmans as Buck Standing
- Margot Hielscher as Helen Philips
- Herbert Hübner as Ted Simmons
- Frida Richard as Kathrin
- Klaus Pohl as Briefträger Pröckl
- Elmer Bantz as Der junge Begleiter von Helen Philips
- Traute Baumbach as Das mollige Animiermädchen in Seaman's Paradiese
- Louis Brody as Der Portier im südamerikanischen Hotel
- Josefine Dora as Frau Schöpf
- Angelo Ferrari as Gast im Seaman's Paradise
- Ursula Herking as Nettie
- Karl Jüstel as Gast im Seaman's Paradise
- Rudolf Kalvius as Ein Anwalt
- Gustl Kreusch as Animierdame
- Evelyn Künneke as Singer'Sing Nachtigall Sing'
- Renate Mannhardt as Die exotische Tänzerin
- Vera Mayr as Krankenschwester
- Annemarie Schäfer as Das melancholische Mädchen
- Marianne Stanior as Das Animiermädchen mit Michael
- Hans Wallner as Der Ober im Ratscafe
- Erich Ziegel as Arzt
- Ernö René
- Ruth Kruse
- Edith Hildebrandt
- Beryl Roberts
- Marianne Beckmann

== Bibliography ==
- Hake, Sabine. Popular Cinema of the Third Reich. University of Texas Press, 2001.
