= Furioso (film) =

1950 film

- Directed by: Johannes Meyer
- Written by: Gustav Kampendonk
- Produced by: Willi Wiesner
- Starring: Ewald Balser; Kirsten Heiberg; Peter van Eyck
- Cinematography: Oskar Schnirch
- Edited by: Walter Fredersdorf
- Music by: Franz Grothe
- Production company: Rondo-Film
- Distributed by: National-Filmverleih
- Release date: 10 November 1950
- Running time: 88 minutes
- Country: West Germany
- Language: German

Furioso is a 1950 West German drama film directed by Johannes Meyer and starring Ewald Balser, Kirsten Heiberg and Peter van Eyck. It was shot at the Wandsbek Studios in Hamburg and on location in Grömitz. The film's sets were designed by the art directors Hans Ledersteger and Ernst Richter.

== Synopsis ==
Celebrated music teacher Professor Soldin has a highly talented student in Peter von Rhoden. Soldin is heartbroken when his young wife and his protégé start having an affair. However, Soldin continues to support his favorite student's musical career even when his wife leaves him for the younger man.

== Cast ==
- Ewald Balser as Professor Soldin
- Kirsten Heiberg as Isa Soldin, seine Frau
- Peter van Eyck as Peter von Rhoden
- Petra Peters as Hilma Delius
- Carl-Heinz Schroth as Carlo
- Käthe Haack as Frau Delius
- Ursula Herking as Erna
- Josef Sieber as Gerhard
- Karin Jacobsen as Karin Steengracht
- Ingrid Lutz as Gerti

== Bibliography ==
- Bock, Hans-Michael and Bergfelder, Tim. The Concise Cinegraph: An Encyclopedia of German Cinema. Berghahn Books, 2009.
