= The Girl from the Marsh Croft (1958 film) =

1958 film

- Directed by: Gustav Ucicky
- Written by: Selma Lagerlöf (novel); Adolf Schütz
- Produced by: Adolf Fischer; Werner Ludwig
- Starring: Maria Emo; Claus Holm; Eva Ingeborg Scholz
- Cinematography: Albert Benitz
- Edited by: Alice Ludwig
- Music by: Siegfried Franz
- Production company: Real Film
- Distributed by: Deutsche Film Hansa
- Release date: 12 September 1958
- Running time: 88 minutes
- Country: West Germany
- Language: German

The Girl from the Marsh Croft (German: Das Mädchen vom Moorhof) is a 1958 West German drama film directed by Gustav Ucicky and starring Maria Emo, Claus Holm and Eva Ingeborg Scholz. It was adapted from Selma Lagerlöf's 1908 eponymous novel. It was a remake of a 1935 film of the same name.

The film's sets were designed by the art director Mathias Matthies and Ellen Schmidt. It was shot at the Wandsbek Studios in Hamburg.

The film won Joseph Offenbach the 1959 Winner German Film Critics Award for best actor.

== Cast ==
- Maria Emo as Helga Nilsson
- Claus Holm as Gudmund Erlandsson
- Eva Ingeborg Scholz as Hildur Lindgren
- Horst Frank as Jan Lindgren
- Werner Hinz as Vater Erlandsson
- Hilde Körber as Mutter Ingeborg
- Hans Nielsen as Amtmann Lindgren
- Wolfgang Lukschy as Per Eric Martinsson
- Joseph Offenbach as Kalle
- Berta Drews as Mutter Nilsson
- Josef Dahmen as Vater Nilsson
- Hans Zesch-Ballot as Richter
- Inge Meysel as Frau Martinsson
- Alice Treff as Frau Lindgren
