= The Irresistible Man =

1937 film directed by Géza von Bolváry

- German film poster
- German: Der Unwiderstehliche
- Directed by: Géza von Bolváry
- Written by: Alexander Lix; Walter Forster
- Produced by: Karl Julius Fritzsche
- Starring: Anny Ondra; Hans Söhnker; Trude Hesterberg
- Cinematography: Werner Brandes
- Edited by: Wolfgang Wehrum
- Music by: Franz Doelle
- Production company: Tobis-Magna-Filmproduktion
- Distributed by: Terra Film
- Release date: 14 October 1937
- Running time: 83 minutes
- Country: Germany
- Language: German

The Irresistible Man (German: Der Unwiderstehliche) is a 1937 German romantic comedy film directed by Géza von Bolváry and starring Anny Ondra, Hans Söhnker, and Trude Hesterberg. The film's sets were designed by the art directors Emil Hasler and Arthur Schwarz.

== Cast ==
- Anny Ondra as Claudette Renier
- Hans Söhnker as André Vallier
- Trude Hesterberg as Renier's aunt
- Erika von Thellmann as Suzanne Midi
- Mady Rahl as Annette, Zofe
- Wilhelm Bendow as Antoine, Diener
- Ernst Dernburg as Charles Vallier
- Hubert von Meyerinck as Marquis de Rossignol
- Paul Heidemann as Pellerine
- Margit Symo as Grisette
- Walter Bechmann as Abteilungsleiter bei Renier
- Harry Berber as private secretary
- Charly Berger as Midi's customer
- Kurt Bobeth-Bolander as barman
- Gustaf Dennert
- Fritz Draeger as dancer at the Midinette Ball
- Max Harry Ernst as guest at Midi's ball
- Hans Fiebrandt as pump attendant
- Paul Ludwig Frey as Gast beim Midinettenball
- Margarete Genske as Mannequin bei Midi
- Eric Harden as Chairman of the Electoral Committee
- Alfred Heynisch as Abteilungsleiter bei Renier
- Herta Humm as Midi's model
- Eva Maria Jobst as Renier's worker
- Alfred Karen as Abteilungsleiter bei Renier
- Hildegard Kiesewetter as dancer
- Maria Krahn as Kaltenbach, secretary
- Gerti Kraus as Arbeiterin bei Vallier
- Fritz Lafontaine as Schiedsrichter bei der Midinettenköniginnenwahl
- Edith Meinhard as Jeanette
- Dorrit Merryll as Marianne
- Waltraud Neckes as Midi's model
- Hermann Pfeiffer as Vallier-Werke's colleague
- Karl Platen as Vallier-Werke's colleague
- Klaus Pohl as reporter
- Anton Pointner as Gaston
- Johanna Reich
- Ferdinand Robert as Midi's customer
- Ernst G. Schiffner
- Rolf J. Schindler as dancer at Midi's ball
- Paul Schroeder
- Willi Schur as policeman
- Hans Sobierayski as Director bei Renier
- Lotte Spira as Midi's customer
- Marianne Stanior as Clarissa
- Toni Tetzlaff as Madame Boebuche
- Hilda Thau as Susette
- Margot Thilo as Arbeiterin bei Vallier
- Alice Treff
- Gerda von der Osten as Midi's model
- Maria von Sokol as Midi's model
- Paul Westermeier as Commissioner
- Sergei Woischeff as man with the voting board
