= The Avenger (1960 film) =

1960 film directed by Karl Anton

- German film poster for The Avenger
- Directed by: Karl Anton
- Written by: Gustav Kampendonk; Rudolf Katscher
- Based on: The Avenger by Edgar Wallace
- Produced by: Kurt Ulrich; Heinz Willeg
- Starring: Heinz Drache; Ingrid van Bergen; Ina Duscha
- Cinematography: Willi Sohm
- Edited by: Walter von Bonhorst
- Music by: Peter Sandloff
- Production company: Kurt Ulrich Filmproduktion
- Distributed by: Europa-Filmverleih
- Release date: 5 August 1960
- Running time: 99 minutes
- Country: West Germany
- Language: German

The Avenger (German: Der Rächer) is a 1960 West German crime film directed by Karl Anton and starring Heinz Drache, Ingrid van Bergen and Ina Duscha. It is based on the 1926 novel The Avenger by Edgar Wallace. It was shot at the Bavaria Studios in Munich. The film's sets were designed by the art director Willi Herrmann.

== Plot ==
A number of packaged disembodied heads have been found in random areas of the English countryside. In each package is a letter to the police from the killer, who dubs himself "The Executioner." The victims are seemingly unrelated to one another. When a Scotland Yard employee is killed, Detective Mike Brixan (Heinz Drache) of Special Branch is called in to investigate. The only clue is that a black, four-door sedan was seen at the scene of the crime and that the typewriter used by the killer has two offset characters.

While interviewing Ruth Sanders (Ina Duscha), the niece of the man killed and the last person to see him alive, while working as an extra on a film set, Brixan discovers a page of a script written on the same typewriter as the Executioner's letters. Consequently, Brixan believes that the Executioner is among the cast, crew, or parties involved in the film shoot.

== Cast ==
- Heinz Drache as Michael Brixan
- Ingrid van Bergen as Stella Mendoza
- Benno Sterzenbach as Sir Gregory Penn
- Ina Duscha as Ruth Sanders
- Ludwig Linkmann as Henry Longvale
- Siegfried Schürenberg as Major Staines
- Klaus Kinski as Lorenz Voss
- Rainer Brandt as Reggie Conolly
- Friedrich Schoenfelder as Jack Jackson (as Friedrich Schönfelder)
- Al Hoosmann as Bhag (as Al Hoosman)
- Maria Litto as Malaiische Tänzerin
- Franz-Otto Krüger as Regie-Assistant Frankie
- Rainer Penkert as Camera Man
- Albert Bessler as News Hound

== Reception ==
Author and film critic Leonard Maltin awarded the film two and a half out of four stars, calling it "[an] Above-par shocker". Dave Sindelar, on his website Fantastic Movie Musings and Ramblings gave the film a mixed review, criticizing the film's poor dubbing, and pacing. However, Sindelar also wrote, "Some of the other Edgar Wallace movies from this time feel the same way, and I sometimes wonder if the movie would fare better in subtitled form. Still, there is a sense of dark, morbid fun to the stories, and I suspect that some time in the future, another enterprising movie company will see the appeal of Wallace’s work and make their own series. And, you know, I wouldn’t mind that at all." TV Guide awarded the film a mixed two out of four stars, calling it "A charming mix of old dark house cliches and behind-the-scenes drama".

== Release ==
The Avenger was released on August 5, 1960 in Frankfurt.

== See also ==
- Klaus Kinski filmography

== Bibliography ==
- Bergfelder, Tim. International Adventures: German Popular Cinema and European Co-Productions in the 1960s. Berghahn Books, 2005.
