= Ina Duscha =

Austrian actress

- Born: 10 December 1935 (age 90); Schöder, Styria, Austria
- Occupation: Film actress
- Years active: 1959-1963 (film)

Ina Duscha (born 1935) is a former Austrian film actress. After marrying in 1963, she retired from the German film industry.

== Selected filmography ==
- Labyrinth (1959)
- I Will Always Be Yours (1960)
- You Don't Shoot at Angels (1960)
- Beloved Augustin (1960)
- The Avenger (1960)
- Three Men in a Boat (1961)
- Aurora Marriage Bureau (1962)
- Venusberg (1963)

== Bibliography ==
- Bergfelder, Tim. International Adventures: German Popular Cinema and European Co-Productions in the 1960s. Berhahn Books, 2005.
