= Jakob und Adele =

- Starring: Brigitte Horney; Carl-Heinz Schroth
- Country of origin: Germany

Production
- Running time: 1982-1989

Jakob und Adele is a German television series.

== Main casts ==
- Carl-Heinz Schroth: Jakob Biedermann
- Brigitte Horney: Adele Schliemann
- Jürgen Thormann: Rudolf Kellner
- Almut Eggert: Lisbeth Kellner
- Judith Brandt: Tochter Marion

== See also ==
- List of German television series
