= Fritz Odemar =

German actor (1890–1955)

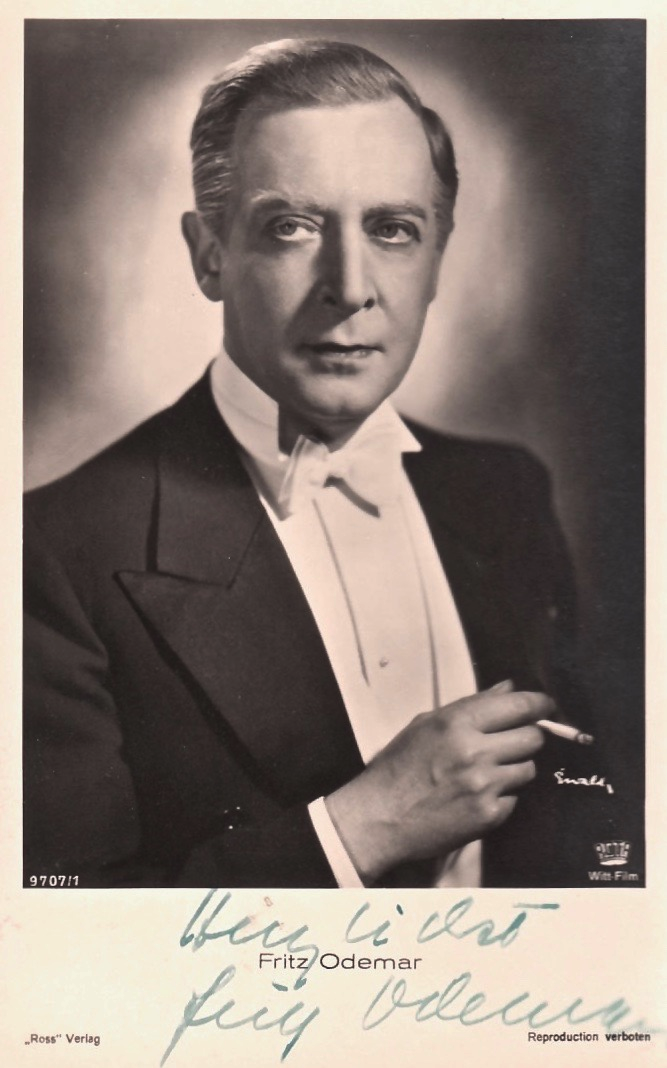
- Born: 13 January 1890; Hannover, German Empire
- Died: 6 June 1955 (aged 65); Munich, West Germany
- Occupation: Actor
- Years active: 1927–1955

Fritz Odemar (13 January 1890 – 6 June 1955) was a German film actor. He appeared in more than 150 films between 1927 and 1955. He was born in Hannover, Germany and died in Munich, West Germany. Odemar's father was the actor Fritz Odemar Sr. (Karl Julius Friedrich Odemar; 1858–1926).

== Selected filmography ==
- The Merry Vineyard (1927) - Knuzius, Klärchens Verlobter
- The Devious Path (1928) - Möller, Regierungsrat
- The Last Fort (1929) - Lieutenant Brand
- Crucified Girl (1929)
- Napoleon at Saint Helena (1929) - Lt. Nichols
- Scandalous Eva (1930) - Lämmerberg
- The Song Is Ended (1930) - Der Verlager / The Editor
- Zwei Krawatten (1930)
- The Stolen Face (1930) - Hempel
- Petit officier... Adieu! (1930) - Teschner
- Wibbel the Tailor (1931) - Fitzke
- Madame Pompadour (1931) - Minister Maurepas
- 1914 (1931) - Prince Lichnowsky
- The Man in Search of His Murderer (1931)
- Three Days of Love (1931)
- The Merry Wives of Vienna (1931) - Johann - Kammerdiener
- Täter gesucht (1931) - Dorner, Diener
- That's All That Matters (1931) - Kriminalkommissar Schierling
- M (1931) - Cheater
- The Theft of the Mona Lisa (1931) - Direktor des Louvre
- I'll Stay with You (1931)
- Liebeskommando (1931)
- Bobby Gets Going (1931) - Felix
- The Captain from Köpenick (1931) - Stadtkämmerer Rosenkrantz
- No Money Needed (1932) - Schröder
- Things Are Getting Better Already (1932)
- Scandal on Park Street (1932)
- A Mad Idea (1932) - Werner Schubart
- A Shot at Dawn (1932) - Dr. Sandegg
- Quick (1932) - Headwaiter
- I Do Not Want to Know Who You Are (1932) - Fritz von Schröder
- The Heath Is Green (1932)
- Spoiling the Game (1932) - Lißmann - Prokurist
- The Testament of Cornelius Gulden (1932) - Bobby Liechenstein
- Haunted People (1932)
- Thea Roland' (1932)
- When Love Sets the Fashion (1932)
- A Door Opens (1933) - Jonny Schlichting
- What Men Know (1933) - Oberpostsekretär Haber
- The Emperor's Waltz (1933)
- A Woman Like You (1933) - Herr von Hohensee
- The House of Dora Green (1933) - Dimitri
- The Star of Valencia (1933) - Kapitän Rustan
- Die Nacht der großen Liebe (1933) - The Counsul
- A Certain Mr. Gran (1933) - Der traurige Herr
- Roman einer Nacht (1933) - Staatsrat Munck
- Ein Unsichtbarer geht durch die Stadt (1933) - Fritz, Kellner
- The Castle in the South (1933) - Der Regisseur
- The Love Hotel (1933) - Spitzbein, Kammerdiener
- Victor and Victoria (1933) - Douglas
- Ich kenn' dich nicht und liebe dich (1934) - Baron Nicki
- Just Once a Great Lady (1934)
- The Double (1934) - Trentner, Diener bei Harry Selsbury
- Miss Madame (1934) - Alfred, Oberkellner
- The Flower Girl from the Grand Hotel (1934) - Der Diener Hermann
- The Switched Bride (1934) - Bittner
- The Four Musketeers (1934) - Ortskommandant
- ...heute abend bei mir (1934) - Mr. Martin, branch manager
- Ich sing mich in dein Herz hinein (1934) - James, ihr Chauffeur
- Ein Walzer für dich (1934) - Baron Tabanes, Ministerpräsident
- Charley's Aunt (1934) - Bressett
- Herr Kobin geht auf Abenteuer (1934) - Kurt Dannenberg, Kriminalkommissar
- Count Woronzeff (1934) - Onkel Gregor
- Farewell Waltz (1934) - Grabowsky, trader
- The English Marriage (1934) - Percival Mavis
- I Marry My Wife (1934) - Dr. Bratt
- Peer Gynt (1934) - Silvan
- Between Two Hearts (1934) - Rudolf Kämmerer
- The Old and the Young King (1935) - Hotham
- Wenn ein Mädel Hochzeit macht (1935) - Schönlein
- Knockout (1935) - Der Theaterdirektor
- Großreinemachen (1935) - Der Diener Brock
- The Fight with the Dragon (1935) - Bihold
- The King's Prisoner (1935) - Jomelli
- Leutnant Bobby, der Teufelskerl (1935) - Jack Stanley, ihr Gatte
- Lady Windermere's Fan (1935) - Lord Augustus
- The Schimeck Family (1935) - Anton Kaltenbach
- The White Horse Inn (1935) - Dr. Siedler, Lawyer
- The Young Count (1935) - Josua
- Rendezvous in Vienna (1936) - Lionel, sein Kammerdiener
- A Strange Guest (1936) - Onkel Théophile
- The Accusing Song (1936) - Baron Brix
- The Hound of the Baskervilles (1937) - Dr. Watson
- Togger (1937) - Mariano
- The Voice of the Heart (1937) - Graf Lossez
- Heimweh (1937) - Webster, Haupt der Schmugglerbande
- Serenade (1937) - P.M. Dörffner, Bratsche
- The Beaver Coat (1937) - Fürst August Sigismund
- Das große Abenteuer (1938) - Theaterdirektor Hessel
- Mystery About Beate (1938) - Konsul Dieckhoff
- Frühlingsluft (1938) - Prinz Eduard
- Discretion with Honor (1938) - Diener
- The Deruga Case (1938) - Hofrat Dr. Mäulchen
- Spaßvögel (1939) - Vogelsang
- Castles in the Air (1939) - Walter
- Der arme Millionär (1939) - Jean, Kammerdiener
- Kitty and the World Conference (1939) - Sir Horace Ashlin
- Verwandte sind auch Menschen (1940) - Washington Schulze
- Mein Mann darf es nicht wissen (1940) - Vater Korn
- Frau nach Maß (1940) - Dr. Paul Buchmann
- Kleider machen Leute (1940) - Graf Stroganoff
- Der Herr im Haus (1940) - Menarek
- Der Sündenbock (1940) - Friedrich Wilhelm Pfeiffer
- Blutsbrüderschaft (1941) - Mr. Cunnings
- Carl Peters (1941) - Count Pfeil
- Happiness is the Main Thing (1941) - Generaldirektor Zimmermann
- Goodbye, Franziska (1941) - Professor Tiemann
- Familienanschluß (1941) - Geschäftsmann Timm
- Kleine Mädchen - große Sorgen (1941) - Dr. Paul Hartung, Arzt
- Leichte Muse (1941) - Forschungsreisender Dr. Cramer
- His Son (1942) - Richard Flemming, Generalmusikdirektor
- Anuschka (1942) - Baron Fery
- The Little Residence (1942) - Herzog von Lauffenburg
- Vom Schicksal verweht (1942) - Prof.Freemann
- Voice of the Heart (1942) - Dr. Overhoff
- To Be God One Time (1942) - Hoteldieb Pawlowitsch
- Love Premiere (1943) - Werner Rombach, Musikverleger
- Circus Renz (1943) - Herr von Grunau
- Journey into the Past (1943) - Professor Hans Kemmerer, Pianist
- A Man With Principles? (1943) - Friedrich Weiden, Christls Vater
- Die schwache Stunde (1943) - Tenor Valentin
- The Song of the Nightingale (1944) - Fürst Monterniccolo
- Das schwarze Schaf (1944)
- Sieben Briefe (1944) - Mr. Burger
- Der Täter ist unter uns (1944) - Ladislaus von Pontembsky
- Dog Days (1944) - Generaldirektor Behring
- A Man Like Maximilian (1945) - Maximilian Holten
- Der Fall Molander (1945)
- Das seltsame Fräulein Sylvia (1945)
- Geld ins Haus (1947)
- Ghost in the Castle (1947) - J.M. - Mauritius
- Film Without a Title (1948) - Writer
- The Time with You (1948) - Lawyer
- Night of the Twelve (1949)
- Encounter with Werther (1949) - Graf
- Viennese Girls (1949) - (uncredited)
- Artists' Blood (1949) - Steffens - Fabrikbesitzer
- Der große Fall (1949)
- Das Gesetz der Liebe (1949) - Martin - Diener bei Pistolecrone
- Who Is This That I Love? (1950) - Diener Michael
- Wedding Night In Paradise (1950) - Otto Röders
- Scandal at the Embassy (1950) - Gefängnisdirektor
- Crown Jewels (1950)
- Desire (1951) - Der Bankpräsident
- The Secret of a Marriage (1951)
- The Thief of Bagdad (1952) - Ibrahim
- Scandal at the Girls' School (1953) - Fürst Maximilian
- Mask in Blue (1953) - Theaterdirektor Corelli
- Ludwig II (1955) - General von der Tann
