= Harald Wolff =

German actor

- Born: 11 January 1909; Barmen, German Empire
- Died: June 1977 (aged 68)
- Occupation: Actor

Harald Otto Walther Wolff (11 January 1909 – June 1977) was a German stage, film and television actor.

== Life ==
Wolff was born in Barmen (now Wuppertal) in 1909. After finishing high school and a commercial apprenticeship, he became an actor, giving his debut in Helmut Käutner's 1939 comedy Kitty and the World Conference.

After World War II, in addition to appearances in German films, he also acted in various international productions, including the 1951 American war drama Decision Before Dawn by Anatole Litvak, the 1956 French comedy film La Traversée de Paris by Claude Autant-Lara, Maurice Labro's 1957 Action immédiate, and Jacques Demy's 1964 musical The Umbrellas of Cherbourg. In 1972, he made his final appearance in Costa-Gavras' political thriller State of Siege.

Wolff was also a voice actor who dubbed many internationally known actors over the decades. These include Desmond Llewelyn as Q in the James Bond films Goldfinger and Thunderball, Charles Boyer in Casino Royale, Vincent Price in Cry of the Banshee and Claude Rains in The Adventures of Robin Hood.

== Filmography ==
Year	Title	Role	Notes
1939	Kitty and the World Conference	Secretary	
1951	Decision Before Dawn	Hartmann	Uncredited
1953	Geheimakten Solvay	Von Kreß	
1956	La Traversée de Paris	German commander	Uncredited
1957	Action immédiate	Lindbaum	
1958	The Cat	Colonel Richting	
1958	Le désordre et la nuit	M. Fridel, Lucky's father	
1961	The Sahara Is Burning	Peter	
1962	Carillons sans joie	Von Ulbricht	
1964	Mission to Hell	John Yakiris	Voice, uncredited
1964	The Umbrellas of Cherbourg	Monsieur Dubourg	
1966	Johnny Colt	Thomas King	
1972	State of Siege	Minister of Foreign Affairs	Final film role
