= Carl Raddatz =

German actor

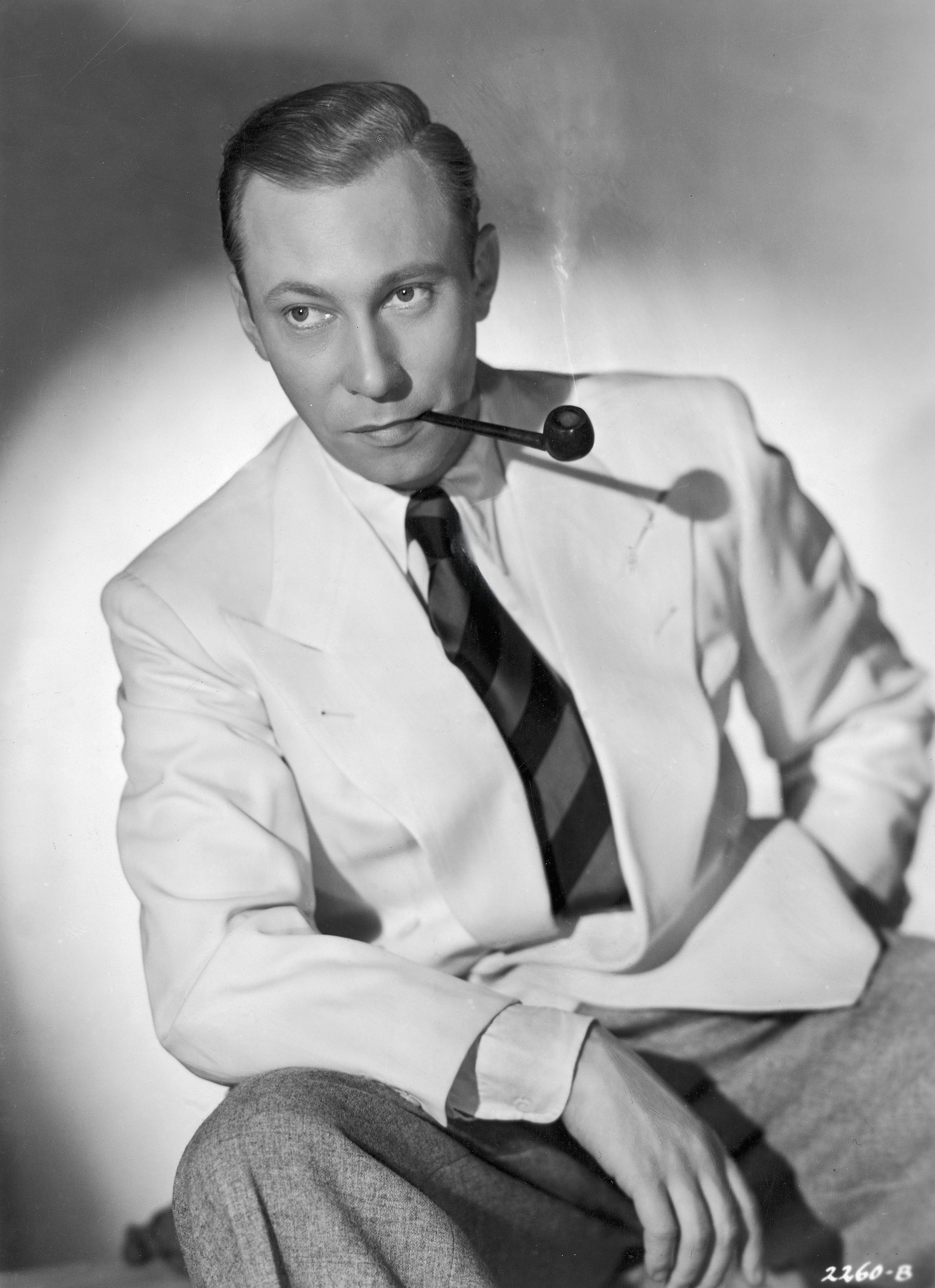
- Born: 13 March 1912; Mannheim, Baden; German Empire
- Died: 19 May 2004 (aged 92); Berlin, Germany
- Occupations: Film actor; Stage actor

Carl Raddatz (13 March 1912 – 19 May 2004) was a German stage and film actor. Raddatz was a leading man of German cinema during the Nazi era appearing in a number of propaganda films and romances. Later in his career he developed a reputation for playing benevolent father figures.

Raddatz was briefly married to actress Hannelore Schroth, but the union ended in divorce.

== Partial filmography ==
- Urlaub auf Ehrenwort (1938) - Grenadier Dr.Jens Kirchhoff
- Faded Melody (1938) - Werner Gront
- Liebelei und Liebe (1938) - Günther Windgassen
- New Year's Eve on Alexanderplatz (1939) - Reinhardt
- Twelve Minutes After Midnight (1939) - Juwelenmakler Griffin
- Liberated Hands (1939) - Graf Joachim von Erken
- We Danced Around the World (1939) - Harvey Swington
- Twilight (1940) - Robert Thiele
- Golowin geht durch die Stadt (1940) - Dr. Robert Cannenburgh
- Wunschkonzert (1940) - Herbert Koch
- Above All Else in the World (1941) - Carl Wiegand
- Stukas (1941) - Hauptmann Heinz Bork
- Heimkehr (1941) - Dr. Fritz Mutius
- 5 June (1942) - Feldwebel Richard Schulz
- Immensee (1943) - Reinhart Torsten
- A Wife for Three Days (1944) - Hanns Jennerberg
- Opfergang (1944) - Albrecht Froben
- That Was My Life (1944) - Dr. Ophoven
- Die Schenke zur ewigen Liebe (1945) - Mathias Bentrup
- Under the Bridges (1946) - Hendrik Feldkamp
- Zugvögel (1947) - Georg
- In Those Days (1947) - Josef / 7. Geschichte
- And If We Should Meet Again (1947) - Narrator
- Where the Trains Go (1949) - Max Engler
- Shadows in the Night (1950) - Richard Struwe
- Gabriela (1950) - Charlie Braatz
- The Shadow of Herr Monitor (1950) - Christoph Monitor / Robb
- The Orplid Mystery (1950) - Pianist Aldo Siano
- Taxi-Kitty (1950) - Charly
- Poison in the Zoo (1952) - Dr. Martin Rettberg
- Towers of Silence (1952) - Robert Morrison
- Beloved Life (1953) - Carl von Bolin
- Regina Amstetten (1954) - Von freyberg
- Confession Under Four Eyes (1954) - Dr. Frigge
- Oasis (1955) - Antoine
- Roses in Autumn (1955) - Major von Crampas
- Night of Decision (1956) - René Dobersin
- Friederike von Barring (1956) - Archibald 'Archi' von Barring
- Das Mädchen Marion (1956) - Dr. Meining, Tierarzt
- Made in Germany (1957) - Professor Ernst Abbe
- Rosemary (1958) - Hartog
- Jons und Erdme (1959) - Jons Baltruschowsky
- The Counterfeit Traitor (1962) - Otto Holtz
- Everyone Dies Alone (1976) - Otto Quangel
- The Buddenbrooks (1979, TV Series) - Johann Buddenbrook sen.

== Bibliography ==
- Bock, Hans-Michael; Bergfelder, Tim, eds. (2009). The Concise Cinegraph: Encyclopaedia of German Cinema. New York: Berghahn Books. ISBN 978-1-57181-655-9.
