= Maria Nicklisch =

German stage actress

- Born: 26 January 1904; Luckenwalde, German Empire
- Died: 20 November 1995 (aged 91); Munich, Germany
- Occupation: Actress
- Years active: 1939–1988 (film)

Maria Nicklisch (1904–1995) was a German stage actress. She also appeared in several films.

== Selected filmography ==
- Kitty and the World Conference (1939)
- Comrades (1941)

== Bibliography ==
- Arthur Holmberg. The Theatre of Robert Wilson. Cambridge University Press, 1996.
