= The Last Chapter (1961 film) =

1961 film

- Directed by: Wolfgang Liebeneiner
- Written by: Georg Hurdalek
- Based on: Siste kapitel by Knut Hamsun
- Produced by: Werner Ludwig
- Starring: Hansjörg Felmy; Karin Baal; Helmuth Lohner
- Cinematography: Heinz Pehlke
- Edited by: Carl Otto Bartning
- Music by: Siegfried Franz
- Production company: Europa-Filmverleih
- Distributed by: Europa-Filmverleih
- Release date: 19 October 1961
- Running time: 109 minutes
- Country: West Germany
- Language: German

The Last Chapter (German: Das letzte Kapitel) is a 1961 West German drama film directed by Wolfgang Liebeneiner and starring Hansjörg Felmy, Karin Baal and Helmuth Lohner. The film is based on the 1923 novel Siste kapitel by Norwegian writer Knut Hamsun. It was shot in Agfacolor at the Göttingen Studios and on location in Bad Harzburg and in Norway. The film's sets were designed by the art directors Mathias Matthies and Ellen Schmidt. Gustav Ucicky was originally intended to the direct the film for the Hamburg-based Europa Film, but he died before filming began was replaced by Liebeneiner.

== Cast ==
- Hansjörg Felmy as Daniel Utby
- Karin Baal as Julie d'Espard
- Helmuth Lohner as Oliver Fleming
- Klausjürgen Wussow as Magnus
- Robert Freitag as Rechtsanwalt Robertsen
- Wolfgang Lukschy as Bertelsen
- Ina Halley as Fräulein Ellingsen
- Leo Bieber as Dr. med. Öyen
- Herta Worell as Frau Konsul Ruben
- Siegfried Schürenberg as Konsul Ruben
- Helmut Oeser as Gendarm Aslaksen
- Lotte Brackebusch as Martha
- Charles Palant as Helmer
- Hans Fitze as Inspektor
- Günter Kasch as Hausdiener
- Jöns Andersson as Andresen
- Helga Schlack as Petra
- Laura Albrecht as Karin
- Bettina Schön as Helena
- Hans Mahnke as Pastor
- Yoka Berretty as Frau Magnus
- Hannelore Primus as Fräulein Hansen
- Jack Hald as Bauer Olaf

== Bibliography ==
- Bock, Hans-Michael & Bergfelder, Tim. The Concise CineGraph. Encyclopedia of German Cinema. Berghahn Books, 2009.
- Costello, Tom. International Guide to Literature on Film. Bowker-Saur, 1994.
- Goble, Alan. The Complete Index to Literary Sources in Film. Walter de Gruyter, 1999.
