= Ellen Fechner =

German novelist and screenwriter

- Born: 24 May 1895; Berlin, German Empire
- Died: 1 April 1951 (aged 55); Hamburg, West Germany
- Occupation: Writer
- Years active: 1942–1949 (film )

Ellen Fechner (1895–1951) was a German novelist and screenwriter.

== Filmography ==
- My Wife Theresa (1942)
- I'll Carry You in My Arms (1943)
- Love Premiere (1943)
- Axel an der Himmelstür (1944)
- Film Without a Title (1948)
- Artists' Blood (1949)

== Bibliography ==
- Baer, Hester. Dismantling the Dream Factory: Gender, German Cinema, and the Postwar Quest for a New Film Language. Berghahn Books, 2012.
