= The Bachelor Trap =

1953 film

- Directed by: Fritz Böttger
- Written by: Fritz Böttger; Albert Kalkus (play); Ludwig Schmid-Wildy; Joachim Wedekind
- Produced by: Wilhelm Sperber; Ludwig Spitaler
- Starring: Oskar Sima; Rudolf Platte; Rudolf Carl
- Cinematography: Erich Claunigk
- Edited by: Friedel Buckow
- Music by: Bert Grund
- Production company: Merkur Film
- Distributed by: Union-Film
- Release date: 22 January 1953
- Running time: 86 minutes
- Country: West Germany
- Language: German

The Bachelor Trap (German: Die Junggesellenfalle) is a 1953 West German comedy film directed by Fritz Böttger and starring Oskar Sima, Rudolf Platte and Rudolf Carl. It was made at the Bavaria Studios in Munich. The film's sets were designed by the art director Max Seefelder.

== Cast ==
- Oskar Sima as Vitus
- Rudolf Platte as Füchsl
- Rudolf Carl as Matthias
- Maria Andergast as Katrin
- Ina Halley as Gretl
- Franz Muxeneder as Wurzl, Amtsdiener
- Lotte Rausch as Frau Berger
- Michael Toost as Franzl
- Maria Stadler as Zenzi
- Ellen Hille as Hausiererin
- Ludwig Schmid-Wildy as Anjan
- Harry Hertzsch as Herr Holzinger
- Paula Braend as Frau Wurzl
- Ina Albrecht as Pfarrersköchin
- Liselotte Berker as Frau Holzinger
- Inge Fitz as Junges Ding
- Ernie Bieler as Singer
- Rudi Hofstätter as Singer

== Bibliography ==
- Goble, Alan. The Complete Index to Literary Sources in Film. Walter de Gruyter, 1999.
