= Taxi-Kitty =

1950 film

- Carl Raddatz, Hannelore Schroth and Karl Schönböck
- Directed by: Kurt Hoffmann
- Written by: Hermann Droop; Jo Hanns Rösler; Kurt E. Walter; Kurt Werner
- Produced by: Rolf Meyer
- Starring: Hannelore Schroth; Carl Raddatz; Fita Benkhoff
- Cinematography: Albert Benitz
- Edited by: Martha Dübber
- Music by: Franz Grothe
- Production company: Junge Film-Union Rolf Meyer
- Distributed by: National-Film
- Release date: 28 December 1950
- Running time: 88 minutes
- Country: West Germany
- Language: German

Taxi-Kitty is a 1950 West German musical comedy film directed by Kurt Hoffmann and starring Hannelore Schroth, Carl Raddatz and Fita Benkhoff. The film was made at the Bendestorf Studios. The film's sets were designed by the art director Franz Schroedter. It was partly shot in Hamburg.

== Synopsis ==
In Hamburg, an out-of-work singer gets a job selling refreshments in a canteen for taxi drivers. When she gets her big break as a singer, she turns it down to marry one of the drivers.

== Cast ==
- Hannelore Schroth as Kitty Grille
- Carl Raddatz as Charly
- Fita Benkhoff as Elvira Rembrandt
- Karl Schönböck as Molander
- Hans Schwarz Jr. as Barsch
- Clown Nuk as himself
- Inge Meysel as 1. Sekretärin
- Gunnar Möller as Boy
- Alexander Hunzinger
- Gustl Busch as Frau Körner
- Susanne Feldmann as 2. Sekretärin

== Bibliography ==
- Hans-Michael Bock and Tim Bergfelder. The Concise Cinegraph: An Encyclopedia of German Cinema. Berghahn Books, 2009.
