= Ludwig Schmitz =

German actor

- Born: 28 January 1884; Cologne, German Empire
- Died: June 28, 1954 (aged 70); Münster, West Germany
- Occupation: Actor
- Years active: 1934-1954 (film)

Ludwig Schmitz (January 28, 1884 – June 28, 1954) was a German film actor. He appeared in more than forty films during his career including the 1951 comedy The Heath Is Green. He was part of the popular comedy duo Tran and Helle along with Joseph "Jupp" Hussels.

Schmitz was a member of the SS from 1 March 1934 and a member of the Nazi Party from May 1937. It was only in the 1950s that the popular comedian was seen again in the West German cinema. He died of a heart attack in 1954.

== Selected filmography ==
- The Unsuspecting Angel (1936)
- The Girl with a Good Reputation (1938)
- A Night in May (1938)
- The Muzzle (1938)
- Hurrah! I'm a Father (1939)
- Wibbel the Tailor (1939)
- The Comedians (1941)
- Opfergang (1944)
- Thirteen Under One Hat (1950)
- The Heath Is Green (1951)
- Pension Schöller (1952)
- The Land of Smiles (1952)
- At the Well in Front of the Gate (1952)
- Rose of the Mountain (1952)
- A Thousand Red Roses Bloom (1952)
- Three Days of Fear (1952)
- Knall and Fall as Detectives (1952)
- Mikosch Comes In (1952)
- Josef the Chaste (1953)
- When The Village Music Plays on Sunday Nights (1953)
- We'll Talk About Love Later (1953)

== Bibliography ==
- Langford, Michelle. Directory of World Cinema: Germany. Intellect Books, 2012.
