= My Wife Theresa =

1942 film

- German: Meine Frau Teresa
- Directed by: Arthur Maria Rabenalt
- Written by: Ellen Fechner (novel); Willy Clever
- Produced by: Fritz Klotsch
- Starring: Elfie Mayerhofer; Hans Söhnker; Rolf Weih
- Cinematography: Eduard Hoesch
- Edited by: Johanna Meisel
- Music by: Ernst Erich Buder
- Production company: Tobis Film
- Distributed by: Deutsche Filmvertriebs
- Release date: 29 December 1942
- Running time: 80 minutes
- Country: Germany
- Language: German

My Wife Theresa (German: Meine Frau Teresa) is a 1942 German comedy film directed by Arthur Maria Rabenalt and starring Elfie Mayerhofer, Hans Söhnker, and Rolf Weih.

The film's sets were designed by the art director Erich Grave.

== Cast ==
- Elfie Mayerhofer as Teresa Dühren - geb. Peters
- Hans Söhnker as Peter Dühren
- Rolf Weih as Georg Brückner
- Mady Rahl as Alexa Flemming
- Harald Paulsen as Alfons Degenhardt
- Jeanette Bethge as Sophie
- Otto Graf as Dr. Grothe, publishing director
- Fritz Böttger as Haase Repoter
- Hans Hermann Schaufuß as registrar
- Wilhelm Bendow as Schnucke, representative
- Wilfried Seyferth as Maler
- Karl Etlinger
- Sascha Keith
- Ernö René
- Karl Platen
- Catja Görna
- Walter Bechmann
- Armin Schweizer
- Alexandra Weiß
- Ernst Rotmund
- Karl Junge-Swinburne
- Willy Kaiser-Heyl
- Fred Köster
- Philipp Manning
- Karl Morvilius
- Annegret Riffel
- Inge Stoldt
- Theodor Vogeler
- Ewald Wenck
