= Father's Day (1955 film) =

1955 film

- Directed by: Hans Richter
- Written by: Heinz Bruck; Fritz Böttger; Hans Wolff
- Produced by: Hermann Schwerin
- Starring: Grethe Weiser; Paul Westermeier; Camilla Spira
- Cinematography: Walter Partsch
- Edited by: Helga Kaminski; Alice Ludwig
- Music by: Michael Jary; Charles Nowa
- Production company: Fono Film
- Distributed by: Europa-Filmverleih
- Release date: 6 July 1955
- Running time: 83 minutes
- Country: West Germany
- Language: German

Father's Day (German: Vatertag) is a 1955 West German comedy film directed by Hans Richter and starring Grethe Weiser, Paul Westermeier and Camilla Spira. It was shot at the Wandsbek Studios in Hamburg and on location around the city. The film's sets were designed by the art directors Mathias Matthies and Ellen Schmidt.

== Synopsis ==
The wives of several respectable town members are concerned that their husbands are spending time secretively with some attractive female dancers. What they don't realise is that they are in fact in training for a dance competition.

== Cast ==
- Grethe Weiser as Thea Brause
- Paul Westermeier as Paul Brause
- Camilla Spira as Berta Helbig
- Willy Reichert as Gustav Helbig
- Blandine Ebinger as Hermine v. Streitwitz
- Ernst Waldow as Major von Streitwitz
- Lotte Rausch as Lucie Novotny
- Günther Lüders as Franz Novotny
- Ursula Grabley as Eva Kugel
- Jupp Hussels as Adam Kugel
- Maria Sebaldt as Gerti Brause
- Peter W. Staub as Egon Kammerhahn
- Ingrid Lutz as Marion Werner
- Joachim Rake as Michaelis

== Bibliography ==
- Bock, Hans-Michael & Bergfelder, Tim. The Concise CineGraph. Encyclopedia of German Cinema. Berghahn Books, 2009.
- Jaedicke, Horst . Willy Reichert: Er wollte alles, ausser Schwäbisch; eine Biographie. Hohenheim, 2010.
