= Beloved Augustin (1960 film) =

1960 film

- German: Der liebe Augustin
- Directed by: Rolf Thiele
- Written by: Horst Wolfram Geissler (novel); Barbara Noack; Gregor von Rezzori
- Produced by: Hans Abich
- Starring: Matthias Fuchs; Ina Duscha; Veronika Bayer
- Cinematography: Günther Anders
- Edited by: Erwin Kasch
- Music by: Bernd Kampka
- Production company: UFA
- Distributed by: UFA
- Release date: 21 January 1960
- Running time: 97 minutes
- Country: West Germany
- Language: German

Beloved Augustin (German: Der liebe Augustin) is a 1960 West German historical comedy film directed by Rolf Thiele and starring Matthias Fuchs, Ina Duscha, and Veronika Bayer. It is not a remake of the 1940 film of the same title.

The film's sets were designed by the art directors Arno Richter and Felix Smetana. It was shot in agfacolor with location filming taking place in Austria and Bavaria. It was made by the revived UFA company.

== Cast ==
- Matthias Fuchs as Augustin Sumser
- Nicole Badal as Friedericke von Bretzenheim
- Veronika Bayer as Susanne
- Ina Duscha as Lady Ann
- Rudolf Forster as Dr. Mesmer
- Dietmar Schönherr as Franz von Gravenreuth
- Walter Rilla as Baron von Gravenreuth
- Margarethe Hruby as Baronin von Gravenreuth
- Kurt Zips as Stotz, Uhrmacher
- Tilo von Berlepsch as Herr von Ziwny
- Xenia Hagman as Sophie von Ungelter
- Carola Rasch as Ketty, Kammerzofe
- Florentine von Castell as Caroline von Westernach
- Ingemarie Tramm as Antonie von Entzberg
- Regine Burghardt as Marie
- Paula Braend
- Toni Treutler as Fischerin
- Carl Simon as Fischer
- Angela Pschigode as Loni
- Helmut Brasch as Steuereinnehmer
- Alfons Teuber as Wirt
- Ernst Brasch as Feldwebel
- Erwin Bredow as Napoleon
- Kurt Pecher as Österreichischer Offizier
- Felix Smetana as Französischer Offizier
- Liselotte Bav as Gräfin
