= Carl-Heinz Schroth =

German actor

- Born: 29 June 1902; Innsbruck, Austria-Hungary
- Died: 19 July 1989 (aged 87); Munich, West Germany
- Occupations: Actor; Film director
- Years active: 1931–1989

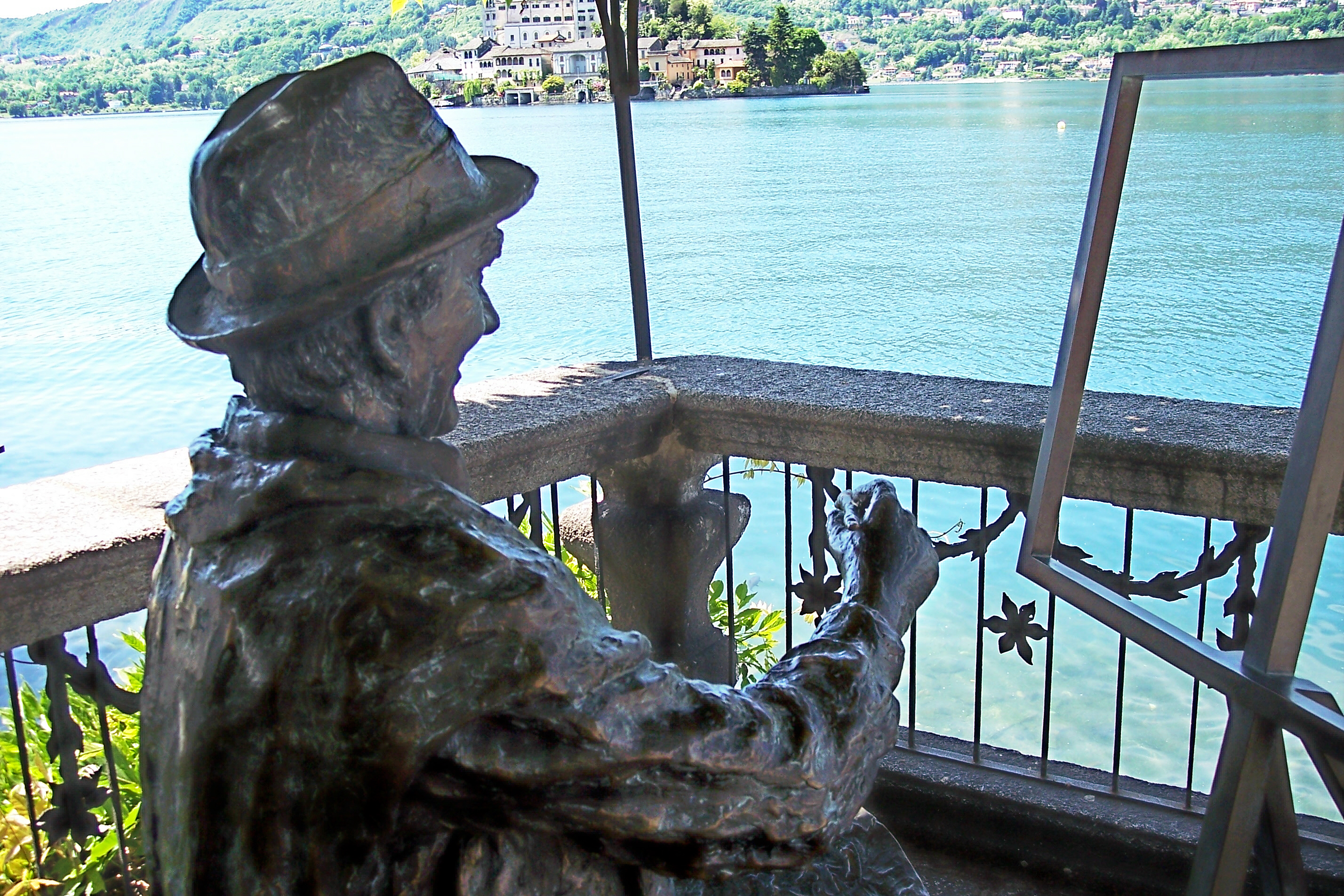
Statue of Carl-Heinz Schroth

Carl-Heinz Schroth (29 June 1902 – 19 July 1989) was a German actor and film director. He appeared in 60 films between 1931 and 1989. He also directed seven films between 1953 and 1963. He was born in Innsbruck, Austria, to Else Ruttersheim and film and stage actor Heinrich Schroth and died in Munich, Germany. His younger half-sister was actress Hannelore Schroth, from his father's marriage to actress Käthe Haack. He was married to the actress Karin Jacobsen.

== Selected filmography ==
Director

- Men at a Dangerous Age (1954)
- The Telephone Operator (1954)
- The Missing Miniature (1954)
- Reaching for the Stars (1955)

Actor

- Der Kongreß tanzt (1931)
- The Coral Princess (1937)
- Crooks in Tails (1937)
- Somewhere in Berlin (1946)
- Morituri (1948)
- Derby (1949)
- My Wife's Friends (1949)
- The Last Night (1949)
- My Niece Susanne (1950)
- Furioso (1950)
- Shadows in the Night (1950)
- A Rare Lover (1950)
- The Shadow of Herr Monitor (1950)
- The Dubarry (1951)
- Under the Thousand Lanterns (1952)
- Don't Forget Love (1953)
- Wenn der Vater mit dem Sohne (1955)
- How Do I Become a Film Star? (1955)
- Secrets of the City (1955)
- I Learned That in Paris (1960)
- Honours for Sale (1963, TV film)
- Alle Hunde lieben Theobald (TV series, 1969–1970)
- Derrick - Season 3, Episode 9: "Ein unbegreiflicher Typ" (1976)
- Jakob und Adele (TV series, 1982–1989)
