= Under the Bridges =

1946 film directed by Helmut Käutner

- Film poster
- Directed by: Helmut Käutner
- Written by: Leo de Laforgue; Helmut Käutner; Walter Ulbrich
- Produced by: Walter Ulbrich
- Starring: Hannelore Schroth; Carl Raddatz; Gustav Knuth; Margarete Haagen
- Cinematography: Igor Oberberg
- Edited by: Wolfgang Wehrum
- Music by: Bernhard Eichhorn
- Production companies: UFA; Terra Film
- Distributed by: Gloria Film
- Release date: 1 September 1946
- Running time: 99 minutes
- Country: Germany
- Language: German

Under the Bridges (German: Unter den Brücken) is a 1946 German drama film directed by Helmut Käutner and starring Hannelore Schroth, Carl Raddatz and Gustav Knuth. The film was shot in Berlin during the summer of 1944, but was not released until after the defeat of Nazi Germany. It premiered in Locarno in September 1946, and was not released in Germany until 1950 when it was picked up for distribution by Gloria Film.

The film uses poetic realism to portray the everyday lives and romances of two Havel boatmen. In 1995, a survey among more than 300 film experts voted Unter den Brücken at No. 18 of the 100 most important German films.

== Cast ==
- Hannelore Schroth as Anna Altmann
- Carl Raddatz as Hendrik Feldkamp
- Gustav Knuth as Willy
- Margarete Haagen as Landlady
- Ursula Grabley as Vera, a waitress
- Hildegard Knef as Girl in Havelberg
- Walter Gross as Man on the bridge
- Helene Westphal
- Hildegard König
- Erich Dunskus as Holl, ship captain
- Klaus Pohl as Museum's employee
- Helmuth Helsig as Muhlke - Café owner

== See also ==
- Überläufer

== Bibliography ==
- Kreimeier, Klaus. The Ufa Story: A History of Germany's Greatest Film Company, 1918–1945. University of California Press, 1999.
