= The Avenger (novel) =

1925 novel

The Avenger or The Hairy Arm
- First edition
- Author: Edgar Wallace
- Language: English
- Genre: Crime
- Publisher: John Long Ltd
- Publication date: 1925
- Publication place: United Kingdom

The Avenger or The Hairy Arm is a 1925 crime novel by the British writer Edgar Wallace.

== Film adaptation ==
In 1960 it was adapted into a West German film The Avenger, part of a long-running series of Wallace adaptations.

== Bibliography ==
- The Avenger at Roy Glashan's Library
