= Hannelore Schroth =

German actress

- Born: Hannelore Emilie Käte Grete Schroth; 10 January 1922; Berlin, Weimar Republic
- Died: 7 July 1987 (aged 65); Munich, West Germany
- Occupation: Actress
- Years active: 1931–1986
- Spouses: Carl Raddatz (m. 1944; div. 1944) Hans Hass (m. 1945; div. 1950) Peter Köster (m. 1953; div. 1965)
- Children: 2
- Parent(s): Käthe Haack (mother); Heinrich Schroth (father)
- Relatives: Carl-Heinz Schroth (half-brother)

Hannelore Emilie Käte Grete Schroth (German: [ˈha.nəˌloː.ʁə ʃʁoːt]; 10 January 1922 – 7 July 1987) was a German film, stage, and television actress whose career spanned over five decades.

== Career ==
Born in Berlin in 1922, she was the daughter of popular stage and film actors Heinrich Schroth and Käthe Haack. Her older half-brother was actor and film director Carl-Heinz Schroth (1902–1989), who was the product of Schroth's father's earlier marriage to Else Ruttersheim.

Schroth began her career as a child actress, and made her film debut at the age of nine in 1931's Max Ophüls' comedy Dann schon lieber Lebertran opposite her mother. Until age sixteen she attended drama school in Lausanne, Switzerland. Her early film successes include Spiel im Sommerwind (1938), Weisser Flieder (1939) and Kitty and the World Conference (1939), the latter of which was her first leading role.

During World War II, Hannelore Schroth continued performing in films. Unlike her father, Heinrich Schroth, who was by then appearing in Nazi propaganda films such as the notorious 1940 anti-Semitic Jud Süß, she avoided overtly political films, such as her appearance in 1945's romantic drama Under the Bridges. After the war, she continued her work extensively in film and returned to the theatre, with engagements in Vienna, Düsseldorf, Hamburg, Berlin and Munich.

In addition to theatre and appearing in German films as an actress, in the 1950s Schroth began a career as a voice actress, dubbing many English language films into German. These include Jane Wyman's character of Carolina Hill in Just for You (1952), Shirley MacLaine in Irma La Douce (1963), Elizabeth Taylor's role as Martha in Who's Afraid of Virginia Woolf? (1966) and Ingrid Bergman's role as Golda Meir in A Woman Called Golda (1982).

In her later years, Schroth began appearing on West German television, as well as appearing on stage and in film.

== Awards ==
For her stage work, she received the 1969 Großen Hersfeld-Preis, and for work as an actress she was awarded the Filmband in Gold in 1980.

== Personal life and death ==
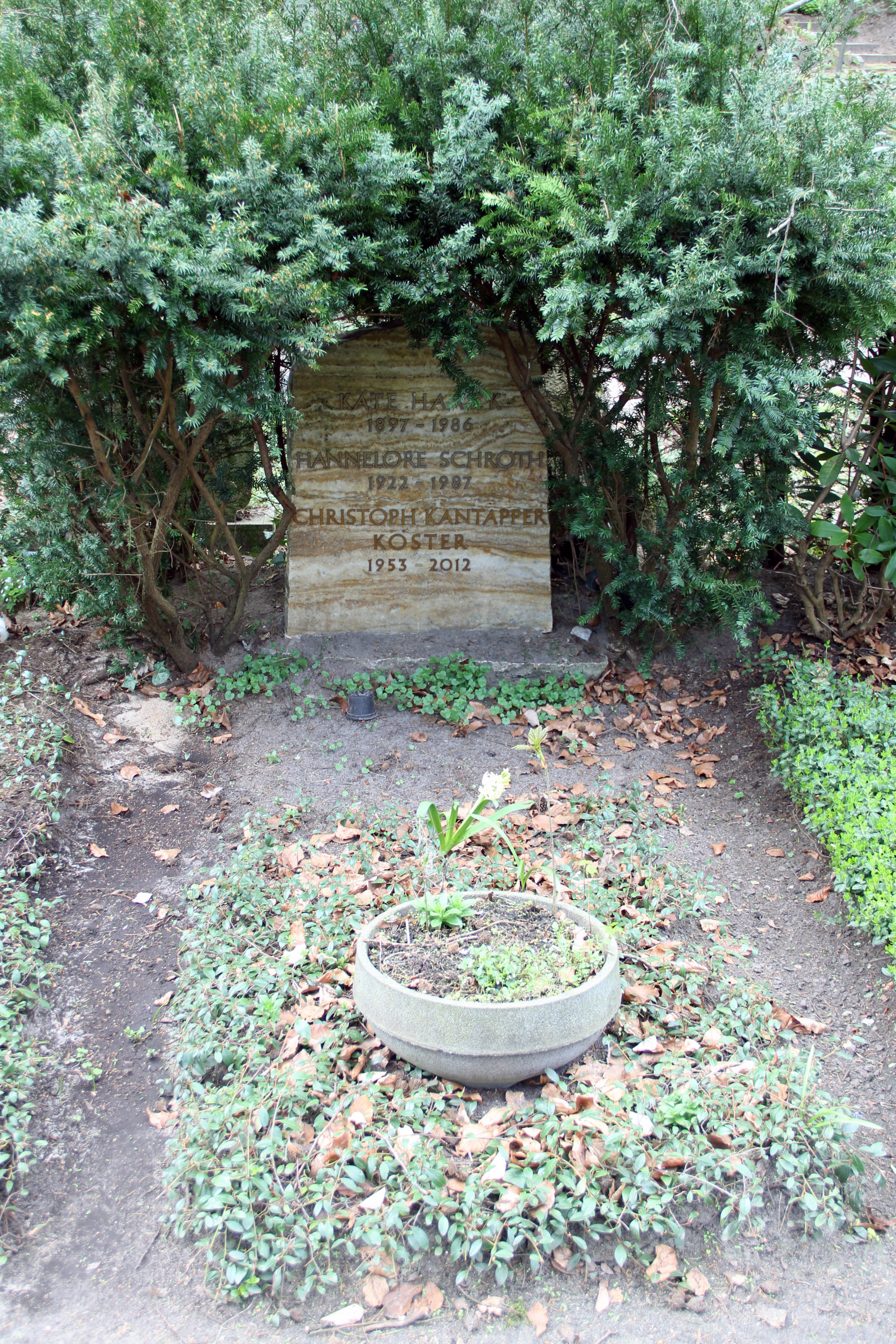
Grave of Schroth, her mother Käthe Haack, and son Christopher Kantapper Köster, at Friedhof Heerstraße in Berlin-Westend

In 1944, Schroth had a short-term marriage with German stage and film actor Carl Raddatz; the union ended in divorce. Her second marriage in 1945 was to the Austrian deep sea diver Hans Hass which lasted until 1950 and produced a son, Hans Hass Jr. (1946–2009) who became an actor and pop singer. Her third marriage from 1953 to 1965 to lawyer and film producer Peter Köster (1922–2014), a son of former diplomat Adolf Köster produced a son, Christopher Kantapper Köster (1953–2012). Both of her sons committed suicide.

Schroth died in 1987 at the age of 65 and was interred at the Friedhof Heerstraße cemetery in Berlin.

== Partial filmography ==
- Dann schon lieber Lebertran (1931, short) - Ellen
- Spiel im Sommerwind (1939) - Änne Osterkamp
- The Governor (1939) - Ebba
- Kitty and the World Conference (1939) - Kitty
- Weißer Flieder (1940) - Anni Rössler
- Friedrich Schiller – The Triumph of a Genius (1940) - Laura Rieger
- Kleine Mädchen – große Sorgen (1941) - Ursula Hartung
- People in the Storm (1941) - Marieluise Kornberg
- Seven Years of Good Luck (1942) - Hella Jüttner
- Sophienlund (1943) - Gabriele Eckberg
- Liebesgeschichten (1943) - Felicitas / Beate Rechenmacher
- Die schwache Stunde (1943) - Marion Austerlitz
- A Wife for Three Days (1944) - Lisa Rodenius
- Seinerzeit zu meiner Zeit (1944) - Ingrid Peters
- Under the Bridges (1946) - Anna Altmann
- The Singing House (1948) - Melanie Cattori
- Hallo – Sie haben Ihre Frau vergessen (1949) - Vera Schmitt
- Lambert Feels Threatened (1949) - Maria
- Derby (1949) - Barbara Hessling
- Kätchen für alles (1949) - Kätchen
- Tobias Knopp – Abenteuer eines Junggesellen (1950) - Dorothee (voice)
- The Beautiful Galatea (1950) - Leni Fink
- Taxi-Kitty (1950) - Kitty Grille
- Unschuld in tausend Nöten (1951) - Eva
- Kommen Sie am Ersten (1951) - Inge Imhof
- Das unmögliche Mädchen (1951) - Frl. Bimbi
- The Prince of Pappenheim (1952) - Stefanie Vernon
- The Daughter of the Regiment (1953) - Tony
- Before Sundown (1956) - Ottilie Klamroth
- The Captain from Köpenick (1956) - Mathilde Obermüller
- Like Once Lili Marleen (1956) - Klärchen Müller
- Beloved Corinna (1956) - Dagmar Mansfeld
- Die Freundin meines Mannes (1957) - Gabriele Roscher
- Voyage to Italy, Complete with Love (1958) - Miss Herzberg
- The Man Who Couldn't Say No (1958) - Eva Träumer
- Everybody Loves Peter (1959) - Sylvia Erdmann
- Sweetheart of the Gods (1960) - Uschi Gunzel
- Heaven, Love and Twine (1960) - Madame Riffi
- Polizeirevier Davidswache (1964) - Margot
- Wir hau'n den Hauswirt in die Pfanne (1971) - Mathilde Zwicknagel
- Emil i Lönneberga (1971) - Mrs. Petrell
- New Mischief by Emil (1972) - Mrs. Petrell
- Emil and the Piglet (1973) - Mrs. Petrell
- Bomber & Paganini (1976) - Mama Sekulovich
- Yesterday's Tomorrow (1978) - Mrs. Almany
- Lucky Star (1979) - Oma Hedwig Lehner
- Peaceful Days (1984) - Silvia
- Herz mit Löffel (1987)
