= The Telephone Operator (1954 film) =

1954 film

- Directed by: Carl-Heinz Schroth
- Written by: Curth Flatow; Karin Jacobsen; Edgar Kahn
- Starring: Renate Holm; Georg Thomalla; Fita Benkhoff
- Cinematography: Ekkehard Kyrath
- Edited by: Walter Wischniewsky
- Music by: Michael Jary
- Production company: Burg-Film
- Distributed by: Europa-Filmverleih
- Release date: 30 June 1954
- Running time: 95 minutes
- Country: West Germany
- Language: German

The Telephone Operator (German: Fräulein vom Amt) is a 1954 West German musical romance film directed by Carl-Heinz Schroth and starring Renate Holm, Georg Thomalla and Fita Benkhoff.

The film's sets were designed by the art director Rolf Zehetbauer.

== Cast ==
- Renate Holm as Susi Behnke
- Georg Thomalla as Peter Lindner
- Fita Benkhoff as Tante Bruni
- Harry Meyen as Curt Cramer
- Ernst Waldow as Vater Behnke
- Ruth Stephan as Lenchen Miesbach
- Mona Baptiste as Singer
- Bully Buhlan as Bobby
- Die Drei Peheiros as Singers
- Jupp Hussels as Direktor Bartel
- Christine Mylius
- Marina Ried as Lilo Hagen
- Helmuth Rudolph

== Bibliography ==
- Bock, Hans-Michael & Bergfelder, Tim. The Concise CineGraph. Encyclopedia of German Cinema. Berghahn Books, 2009.
