= I'll Carry You in My Arms =

I'll Carry You in My Arms may refer to:

- I'll Carry You in My Arms (1943 film), a German romance film
- I'll Carry You in My Arms (1958 film), a West German drama film
