= Gitty Djamal =

German actress

- گیتی جمال
- Born: Gitty Darugar; May 11, 1936 (age 90); Tehran, Imperial State of Iran
- Occupation: Actress
- Years active: 1957–1987 (film & TV)

Gitty Djamal (born 11 May 1936) is an Iranian-German film and television actress. She has also worked as a photographer.

== Selected filmography ==
- Stage Fright (1960)
- Carnival Confession (1960)
- Salto Mortale (1969–1972, TV series)
- The Three Musketeers (1973)
- The Four Musketeers (1974)

== Bibliography ==
- Thomas Elsaesser. Rainer Werner Fassbinder. Bertz, 2001.
