= Matthias Fuchs =

German actor (1939–2001)

- Born: 3 November 1939; Hanover, Germany
- Died: 31 December 2001 (aged 62); Hamburg, Germany
- Occupation: Actor
- Years active: 1955–2001 (film & TV)

Matthias Fuchs (1939–2001) was a German stage, film and television actor.

== Partial filmography ==
- The Immenhof Girls (1955) - Ethelbert
- The First Day of Spring (1956) - Martin
- Hochzeit auf Immenhof (1956) - Ethelbert
- Der Meineidbauer (1956) - der junge Franz Ferner (uncredited)
- Ferien auf Immenhof (1957) - Ethelbert
- U 47 – Kapitänleutnant Prien (1958) - Jörg
- The Angel Who Pawned Her Harp (1959) - Klaas Henning
- Two Times Adam, One Time Eve (1959) - Peter
- The Buddenbrooks (1959) - Leutnant von Trotha
- Beloved Augustin (1960) - Augustin Sumser
- Mit 17 weint man nicht (1960) - Horst
- Das Mädchen und der Staatsanwalt (1962) - Berndt
- Liebling, ich muß dich erschießen (1962) - Ein Hotelboy
- The Cardinal (1963) - Father Neidermoser
- The Last Days of Gomorrah (1974, TV film) - Kalle
- Mother Küsters' Trip to Heaven (1975) - Knab
- Death is My Trade (1977) - Sturmbannführer Kellner
- Lola (1981) - Esslin
- A Woman in Flames (1983) - Markus
- Decoder (1984) - H-Burger Manager
- The Noah's Ark Principle (1984) - Felix Kronenberg
- Grottenolm (1985) - Peckert
- Tamboo (1985)
- The Summer of the Samurai (1986) - Dr. Herbst
- The Madonna Man (1987) - Gonski
- Der Fall Boran (1987) - Zand
- Europa, abends (1989) - Bari / Krüger / Tschug / Kanalarbeiter
- Hard Days, Hard Nights (1989)
- My Lovely Monster (1991)
- Das gemordete Pferd (1991) - Erwin
- Mau Mau (1992)
- Im Himmel hört dich niemand weinen (1993)
- Durst (1993) - Pastor
- Rotwang Must Go! (1994) - Carlos
- Die Eroberung der Mitte (1995) - Dr. Konstantin
- Deathmaker (1995) - Dr. Machnik
- One More Kiss and He's Dead! (1996) - Günther Stapenhorst
- Der stille Herr Genardy (1997) - Josef Genardy
- Hundert Jahre Brecht (1998)
- Planet of the Cannibals (2001) - Dienstag
- Prüfstand VII (2001) - General Dornberger

== Bibliography ==
- Langford, Michelle. Directory of World Cinema: Germany, Volume 10. Intellect Books, 2010.
