= Ellen Schmidt =

German art director

- Born: 13 March 1922; Gelsenkirchen, Germany
- Died: 12 March 1997 (aged 74); Hamburg, Germany
- Occupation: Art director
- Years active: 1951-1990 (film & TV)

Ellen Schmidt (1922–1997) was a German art director active in film set design in the postwar era. She frequently collaborated with her husband Mathias Matthies, including on several Edgar Wallace adaptations.

== Selected filmography ==
- Dark Eyes (1951)
- The Sinful Border (1951)
- Shooting Stars (1952)
- My Wife Is Being Stupid (1952)
- Don't Worry About Your Mother-in-Law (1954)
- Men at a Dangerous Age (1954)
- I Was an Ugly Girl (1955)
- My Children and I (1955)
- Father's Day (1955)
- The First Day of Spring (1956)
- The Girl from the Marsh Croft (1958)
- Crime After School (1959)
- The Merry War of Captain Pedro (1959)
- Yes, Women are Dangerous (1960)
- The Forger of London (1961)
- The Green Archer (1961)
- The Last Chapter (1961)
- The Inn on the River (1962)
- The Happy Years of the Thorwalds (1962)
- Aurora Marriage Bureau (1962)

== Bibliography ==
- Bergfelder, Tim. International Adventures: German Popular Cinema and European Co-Productions in the 1960s. Berghahn Books, 2005.
