= Aurora Marriage Bureau =

1962 film

- Directed by: Wolfgang Schleif
- Written by: Walter Forster
- Based on: Aurora Marriage Bureau by Hans-Ulrich Horster
- Produced by: Kurt Ulrich
- Starring: Eva Bartok; Carlos Thompson; Elisabeth Flickenschildt
- Cinematography: Friedl Behn-Grund
- Edited by: Ira Oberberg
- Music by: Peter Sandloff
- Production company: Kurt Ulrich Filmproduktion
- Distributed by: Nora-Filmverleih
- Release date: 18 January 1962
- Running time: 104 minutes
- Country: West Germany
- Language: German

Aurora Marriage Bureau (German: Eheinstitut Aurora) is a 1962 West German mystery crime film directed by Wolfgang Schleif and starring Eva Bartok, Carlos Thompson and Elisabeth Flickenschildt. It is based on the novel of the same title by Hans-Ulrich Horster. It was shot at the Tempelhof Studios in West Berlin. The film's sets were designed by the art directors Albrecht Hennings, Ellen Schmidt and Mathias Matthies.

== Synopsis ==
Eva Horn has spent several years in prison for murdering her wealthy industrialist husband. Still protesting her innocence, her lawyer secures her a release of one week to try and find the real killer. Her investigations take her to an outwardly respectable marriage bureau in Berlin which is actually a front for a shady blackmailing ring run by a fraudulent baroness.

== Cast ==
- Eva Bartok as Eva Horn
- Carlos Thompson as Christinow Tomkin
- Elisabeth Flickenschildt as Hortense Edle von Padula
- Claus Holm as Arnold Lewandowski
- Hans Nielsen as Dr. Burgmüller, Anwalt
- Ina Duscha as Lore Karmann
- Rainer Brandt as Friedrich - Sohn
- Rudolf Vogel as Graf Hohenperg
- Ljuba Welitsch as Mrs. Pearl
- Albert Bessler as Charles, Diener
- Ruth Nimbach as Fräulein Stadlmeier
- Walter Gross as Herr Bolwieser
- Carsta Löck as Zenzi, Hausmädchen

== Bibliography ==
- Curti, Roberto. Blood and Black Lace. Liverpool University Press, 2020.
- Quinlan, David. Quinlan's Film Stars. Batsford, 2000.
