= Jupp Hussels =

German actor

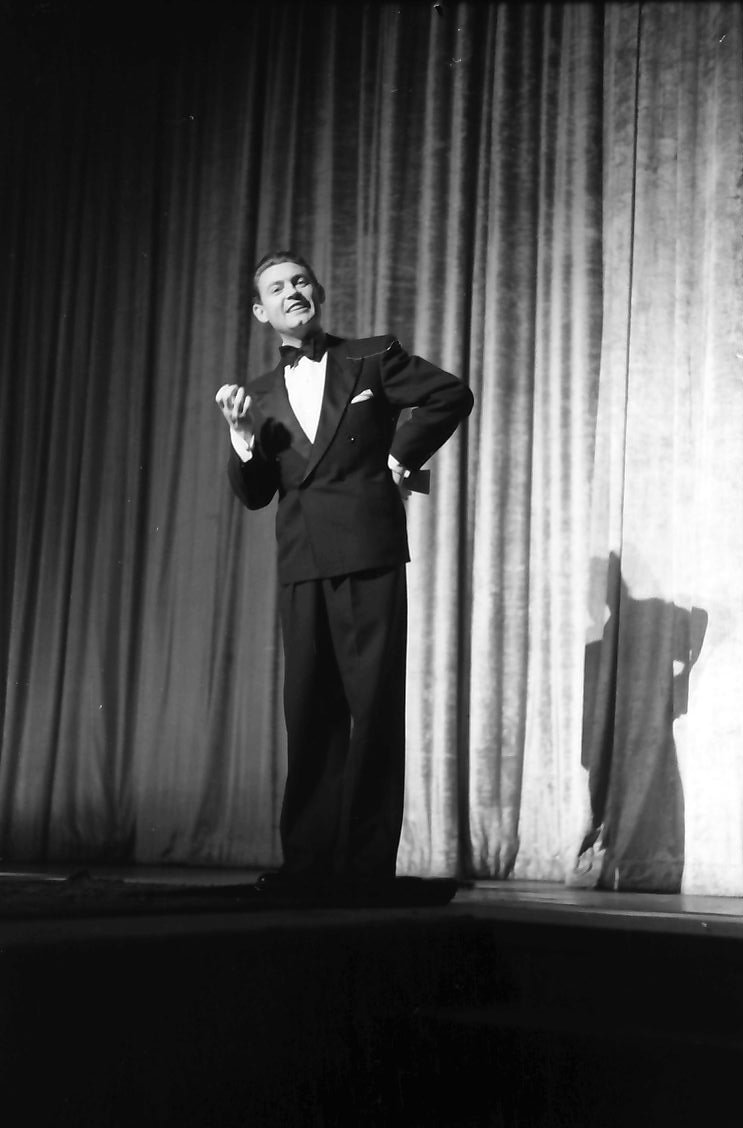
- Hussels in 1938
- Born: 30 January 1901; Düsseldorf, German Empire
- Died: 10 April 1986 (aged 85); Großenhain, West Germany
- Occupation: Actor
- Years active: 1933–1977 (Film and TV)

Jupp Hussels (1901–1986) was a German actor and comedian. He performed widely in cabaret, stage, film and radio. During the Second World War he appeared in the Tran and Helle series of short films, which featured propaganda for the German cause. Hussels played Helle the suaver, more knowledgeable of the two discussing events with the ignorant, apolitical Tran played by Ludwig Schmitz.

== Selected filmography ==
- Das lustige Kleeblatt (1933)
- Peter, Paul and Nanette (1935)
- One Too Many on Board (1935)
- The Abduction of the Sabine Women (1936)
- Herbstmanöver (1936)
- The Missing Wife (1937)
- The Secret Lie (1938)
- Der dunkle Punkt (1940)
- Weltrekord im Seitensprung (1940)
- A Beautiful Day (1944)
- Heimat, deine Sterne (1951)
- Drei Kavaliere (1951)
- Once on the Rhine (1952)
- The Imaginary Invalid (1952)
- The Telephone Operator (1954)
- Sun Over the Adriatic (1954)
- The Forest House in Tyrol (1955)
- Father's Day (1955)
- Operation Sleeping Bag (1955)

== Bibliography ==
- Buruma, Ian. Stay Alive: Berlin, 1939–1945. Atlantic Books, 2026.
- Herzog, Rudolph. Dead Funny: Telling Jokes in Hitler's Germany. Melville House, 2011.
- Pridham, Geoffrey & Noakes, Jeremy. Nazism, 1919–1945: The German Home Front in World War II. University of Exeter Press, 1983.
