= Christian Gollong =

German actor

- Born: 24 June 1901; Nied, Frankfurt am Main, German Empire
- Died: 27 July 1988 (aged 87); Nienhagen, Staufenberg, Lower Saxony, West Germany
- Occupation: Actor

Christian Gollong (1901–1988) was a German stage and film actor. He appeared in four films in major roles, all of them in 1939.

== Selected filmography ==
- In the Name of the People (1939)
- Kitty and the World Conference (1939)
- The Wise Mother-in-Law (1939)

== Bibliography ==
- Wolfgang Jacobsen & Hans Helmut Prinzler. Käutner. Spiess, 1992.
