= Salto Mortale (TV series) =

German television series

- Written by: Heinz Oskar Wuttig
- Directed by: Michael Braun
- Starring: Gustav Knuth; Hellmut Lange; Horst Janson; Kai Fischer; Hans-Jürgen Bäumler; Hans Söhnker; Margot Hielscher; Margitta Scherr; Gitty Djamal; Sabine Eggerth; Joseph Offenbach; Bum Krüger
- Country of origin: West Germany
- No. of seasons: 2
- No. of episodes: 18

Production
- Running time: 60 minutes

Original release
- Network: ARD
- Release: January 29, 1969 – January 26, 1972

Salto Mortale is a West German television series. It centres around a troupe of trapeze artists, known as the Flying Dorias as they embark on a major European tour.

== Main cast ==
- Gustav Knuth as Carlo Doria
- Gitty Djamal as Lola
- Horst Janson as Sascha Doria
- Andreas Blum as Rudolpho
- Hans-Jürgen Bäumler as Vicco
- Karla Chadimová as Nina
- Margitta Scherr as Francis
- Hans Söhnker as Direktor Kogler
- Sabine Eggerth as Helga
- Wilhelm Bühring as Gordon
- Hellmut Lange as Mischa
- Andrea L'Arronge as Biggi
- Niko Macoulis as Pedro
- Alexander Vogelmann as Tino
- Yumata Pauli as Ansagerin
- Bum Krüger as Horn
- Helmut Werner as Helmut
- Joseph Offenbach as Manager Jacobsen
- Ursula von Manescul as Brenda Lind
- Bruno W. Pantel as Texas Bill
- Kai Fischer as Tiger-Lilli
- Irmgard Paulis as Jenny
- Margot Hielscher as Gloria

== See also ==
- List of German television series

== Bibliography ==
- Bock, Hans-Michael & Bergfelder, Tim. The Concise CineGraph. Encyclopedia of German Cinema. Berghahn Books, 2009.
