= Ich zähle täglich meine Sorgen =

- Directed by: Paul Martin
- Written by: Helmuth M. Backhaus; Curth Flatow; Herbert B. Fredersdorf (idea); Eckart Hachfeld
- Produced by: Benno Kaminski (producer); Hans Raspotnik (executive producer)
- Starring: Peter Alexander; Ingeborg Schöner; Gunther Philipp
- Cinematography: Karl Löb
- Edited by: Hermann Haller
- Music by: Heinz Gietz
- Production company: Studio Film
- Distributed by: Constantin Film
- Release date: 11 May 1960
- Running time: 92 minutes
- Country: West Germany
- Language: German

Ich zähle täglich meine Sorgen [I Daily Count My Sorrows] is a 1960 West German musical comedy film directed by Paul Martin and starring Peter Alexander, Ingeborg Schöner and Gunther Philipp.

The film's sets were designed by the art directors Dieter Bartels, Mathias Matthies and Ellen Schmidt. It was shot at the Bendestorf Studios outside Hamburg.

== Cast ==
- Peter Alexander as Peter Hollmann
- Ingeborg Schöner as Rosemary Bancroft
- Gunther Philipp as Teddy Quick
- Loni Heuser as Myrtle
- Christiane König as Tatjana
- Paul Esser as Captain Friedrichsen
- Kurt Waitzmann as First Officer
- Hans Paetsch as William Bancroft
- Gerhard Hartig as Paymaster
- Peter Frank as Tajada
- Benno Gellenbeck as Figueiras
- Hilde Lorenz as Miss Kerr
- Maria Martinsen as Frau
- Kurt Fuß as Bald Man
- Victoria Voncampe
- Ada Krauss
- Renate Rönnau
- Kurt Blachy as Taxi Driver

== Soundtrack ==
- Peter Alexander and Orchestra Kurt Edelhagen – "Bim-Bam Bumerang" (Written by Heinz Gietz and Kurt Feltz)
- Peter Alexander and Orchestra Kurt Edelhagen – "Nimm mich mit nach Cheriko (Take Me Back To Cheriko)" (Written by Heinz Gietz and Kurt Feltz)
- Peter Alexander and Orchestra Erich Werner – "Ich zähle täglich meine Sorgen" (Written by Harlan Howard and Jean Nicolas)
- Peter Alexander and Orchestra Kurt Edelhagen – "Mariana" (Written by Heinz Gietz and Kurt Feltz)
