= Hans Söhnker =

German actor (1903–1981)

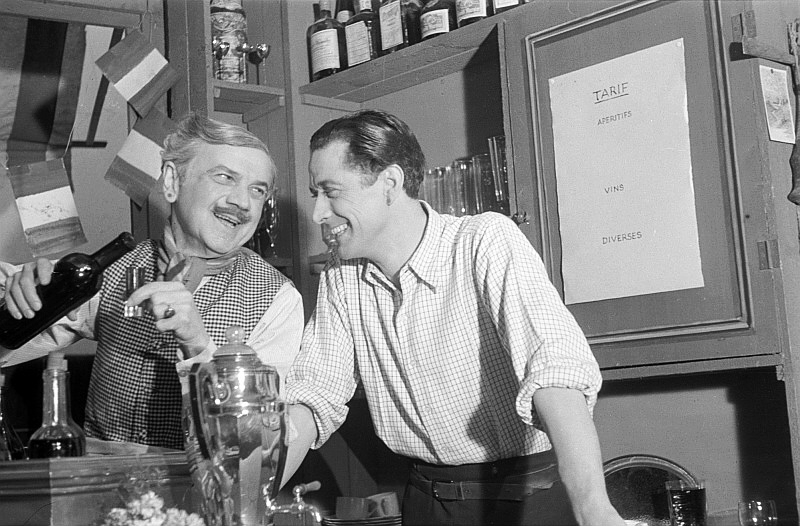
- Hans Leibelt and Hans Söhnker
- Born: 11 October 1903; Kiel, German Empire
- Died: 20 April 1981 (aged 77); West Berlin, West Germany
- Occupation: Actor
- Years active: 1933–1980

Hans Söhnker (11 October 1903 – 20 April 1981) was a German film actor. He appeared in more than 100 films between 1933 and 1980. He was born in Kiel, Germany and died in West Berlin.

== Selected filmography ==
- The Tsarevich (1933) – Der Zarewitsch
- The Black Forest Girl (1933) – Hans Fichtner, Student
- Annette im Paradies (1934) – Hans Siebert
- The Big Chance (1934) – Thomas Menzel
- Ich sing' mich in dein Herz hinein (1934) – Hans, sein Sohn
- The Csardas Princess (1934) – Prinz Edwin Weylersheim
- Jede Frau hat ein Geheimnis (1934) – Hans Jürgens
- She and the Three (1935) – Rudolf Rostorff, Zimmerkellner
- Eva (1935) – Georg von Hochheim
- Dreams of Love (1935) – Leutnant Baron Koloman von Eötvös
- The Young Count (1935) – Hans Flint
- Herbstmanöver (1936) – Viktor von Randau
- Faithful (1936) – Carl Koster
- A Doctor of Conviction (1936) – Dr. Wüstefeld
- Where the Lark Sings (1936) – Hans Berend
- The Three Around Christine (1936) – Eggert
- Dinner Is Served (1936) – Robert Spiller
- Und du mein Schatz fährst mit (1937) – Dr.-Ing. Heinz Fritsch
- Truxa (1937) – Chef einer Tanzgrippe
- Patricia Gets Her Man (1937) – Count Stephan d'Orlet
- The Model Husband (1937) – Jack Wheeler
- The Irresistible Man (1937) – André Vallier
- Die Fledermaus (1937) – Kammersänger Hans Weigel / Eisenstein
- Musik für dich (1937) – Peter
- The Woman at the Crossroads (1938) – Fred Moebius
- The Day After the Divorce (1938) – Julian Bork, Sportflieger
- The Four Companions (1938) – Stefan Kohlund
- Geld fällt vom Himmel (1938) – Hans Promm
- Der Tag nach der Scheidung (1938) – Ruda, Dompteur
- Mistake of the Heart (1939) – Flugkapitän van Santen
- Gold in New Frisco (1939) – Frank Norton
- Men Are That Way (1939)
- Brand im Ozean (1939) – Nick Dorland
- Nanette (1940) – Alexander Patou
- Woman Made to Measure (1940) – Christian Bauer
- Blutsbrüderschaft (1941) – Oberleutnant Klaus Olden
- Goodbye, Franziska (1941) – Michael Reisiger
- Wenn du noch eine Heimat hast (1942) – Heinrich Doorn
- The Big Game (1942) – Zuschauer
- Fronttheater (1942) – Selbst / Himself (unconfirmed, uncredited)
- My Wife Theresa (1942) – Peter Dühren
- Nacht ohne Abschied (1943) – Rittmeister Gunnar Nyborg
- Love Premiere (1943) – Komponist Axel Berndt
- A Man With Principles? (1943) – Dr. Hans Winhold
- Der Engel mit dem Saitenspiel (1944) – Hans Gustav (Achim) Strengholt
- Große Freiheit Nr. 7 (1944) – Willem
- Film ohne Titel (1948) – Martin Delius
- Hallo, Fräulein! (1949) – Walter Reinhardt
- Einmaleins der Ehe (1949) – Peter Norden
- Beloved Liar (1950) – Rudolf Siebert
- Only One Night (1950) – Der Mann
- The Rabanser Case (1950) – Peter Rabanser
- Love and Blood (1951) – Marco, capo camorra
- Shadows Over Naples (1951) – Marco, capo Camorra
- White Shadows (1951) – Richard
- My Friend the Thief (1951) – Percy
- Queen of the Arena (1952) – Professor Gerhart Mahnke, Bildhauer
- The Singing Hotel (1953) – Hans
- The Stronger Woman (1953) – Jochen Faber
- Must We Get Divorced? (1953) – Dr. Algys
- A Life for Do (1954) – Thomas
- Men at a Dangerous Age (1954) – Franz Volker
- Hoheit lassen bitten (1954) – Graf Rosen-Bückburg
- The Great Test (1954) – Dr. Clausen
- Doctor Solm (1955) – Oberarzt Dr. Karl Solm
- One Woman Is Not Enough? (1955) – Ernst Vossberg
- Before God and Man (1955) – Georg
- Studentin Helene Willfüer (1956) – Professor Mathias
- Holiday in Tyrol (1956) – Robert von Stetten
- If We All Were Angels (1956) – Enrico Farlotti
- Beloved Corinna (1956) – Peter Mansfeld
- Wie schön, daß es dich gibt (1957) – Theo Henning
- Die Freundin meines Mannes (1957) – Alfred Roscher
- Immer wenn der Tag beginnt (1957) – Wolfgang Cornelius – Gymnasialdirektor
- Die singenden Engel von Tirol (1958) – Erik Kramer
- Worüber man nicht spricht – Frauenarzt Dr. Brand greift ein (1958) – Professor Dr. Brand
- For the First Time (1959) – Prof. Bruckner
- Jacqueline (1959) – Zander, Theaterdirektor
- I'm Marrying the Director (1960) – Direktor Georg Stahlmann
- Brainwashed (1960) – Bishop Ambrosse
- Carnival Confession (1960) – Panezza
- Wegen Verführung Minderjähriger (1960) – Dr. Stefan Rugge, Studienrat
- I Will Always Be Yours (1960) – Heinrich Horstmann
- Our House in Cameroon (1961) – Willem Ambrock
- The Longest Day (1962) – Pemsel's Officer (uncredited)
- Sherlock Holmes and the Deadly Necklace (1962) – Prof. Moriarty
- Dulcinea (1963)
- The Phantom of Soho (1964) – Sir Phillip
- The World Revolves Around You (1964) – Richard Fischer, Martins Vater
- The Hound of Blackwood Castle (1968) – Anwalt Robert Jackson
- Salto Mortale (1969, TV series) – Direktor Kogler
- Photo Finish (1970, TV film) – Sam Kinsale
