= The Switched Bride =

1934 German film

- Directed by: Karel Lamac
- Written by: Henry Koster; Peter Ort; Hans H. Zerlett
- Produced by: Artur Hohenberg; Karel Lamac; Anny Ondra
- Starring: Anny Ondra; Anton Walbrook; Fritz Odemar
- Cinematography: Otto Heller; Otto Martini
- Edited by: Ella Ensink
- Music by: Leo Leux
- Production company: Ondra-Lamac-Film
- Distributed by: Bavaria Film
- Release date: 17 April 1934
- Running time: 86 minutes
- Country: Germany
- Language: German

The Switched Bride (German: Die vertauschte Braut) is a 1934 German comedy film directed by Karel Lamac and starring Anny Ondra, Anton Walbrook and Fritz Odemar. It was shot at the Bavaria Studios in Munich. The film's sets were designed by the art director Benno von Arent.

== Plot ==
Wealthy Virginia pays her lookalike Colly to serve a prison sentence in her place. When Colly is released, she sets her sights on Virginia's intended husband Charles, masquerading as the wealthier woman.

== Cast ==
- Anny Ondra as Virginia Vanderloo / Colly
- Anton Walbrook as Charles
- Fritz Odemar as Bittner
- Otto Wernicke as Der Gefängnisdirektor
- Magda Lena
- O.E. Hasse
- Beppo Brem
- Josef Eichheim
- Otto Brüggemann

== Bibliography ==
- Hales, Barbara, Petrescu, Mihaela and Weinstein, Valerie. Continuity and Crisis in German Cinema, 1928-1936. Boydell & Brewer, 2016.
- Klaus, Ulrich J. Deutsche Tonfilme: Jahrgang 1934. Klaus-Archiv, 1988.
- Rentschler, Eric. The Ministry of Illusion: Nazi Cinema and Its Afterlife. Harvard University Press, 1996.
