= Roland Kaiser (actor) =

German actor and voice actor

- Born: 9 April 1943; Damsdorf, Nazi Germany
- Occupation: Actor
- Years active: 1954–1997 (film)

Roland Ernst Wolf Kaiser (9 April 1943 – 4 January 1998) was a German actor. He appeared in 27 films and television series between 1954 and 1997. He also worked as a voice actor, dubbing foreign films for release in Germany.

== Filmography ==
Year	Title	Role	Notes
1954	The Faithful Hussar	Kurtchen	
1954	Emil and the Detectives	Der kleine Dienstag	
1954	Keine Angst vor Schwiegermüttern	Herbert Steinberg	
1955	My Children and I	Peter Hartmann	
1957	The Girl and the Legend	Ben	
1957	The Zurich Engagement	Helge Frank / Pips	
1957	Vater, unser bestes Stück	Sohn Thomas Keller	
1957	Casino de Paris	Peter, Catherines Bruder	
1957	Liebe, Jazz und Übermut	Mäckie	
1957	Heute blau und morgen blau	Klaus Bunzel	
1957	Ferien auf Immenhof	Fritzchen	
1958	Munchhausen in Africa	Karlchen Mai	
1958	Man in the River	Timm Hinrichs	
1958	Ihr 106. Geburtstag	Eduard Burger	
1958	Ohne Mutter geht es nicht	Thomas	
1958	Kleine Leute mal ganz groß	Theo Lustig	
1959	What a Woman Dreams of in Springtime	Rudi Brandt	
1959	Roses for the Prosecutor	Werner Schramm	
1961	Always Trouble with the Bed		
1961	Ramona	Regieassistent	
1995	Nich' mit Leo	Vater	(final film role)
