= Veronika Bayer =

German actress

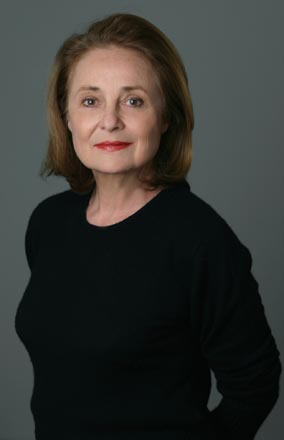
Veronika Bayer

Veronika Bayer (born 4 June 1940, Stuttgart – d. 31 January 2008) was a German actress.

== Filmography ==
- 1959: Liebe, Luft und lauter Lügen
- 1959: Melodie und Rhythmus
- 1959: Twelve Girls and One Man
- 1960: Beloved Augustin
- 1960: When the Heath Is in Bloom
- 1963: Die Legende vom heiligen Trinker (TV film)
- 1970: Triumph des Todes oder Das große Massakerspiel (TV film)
- 1974: Macbeth (TV film)
- 1977: Rückfälle (TV film)
- 1979: 30 Liter Super (TV episode of Tatort)
- 1993: Die Lok
- 2002: Zwischen den Sternen
- 2002: Der Narr und seine Frau heute Abend in Pancomedia (TV film)
- 2005: Die letzte Saison
- 2006: Die Österreichische Methode
- 2007: Marie kann zaubern
