= Mathias Matthies =

German art director

- Born: 7 August 1911; Potsdam, Brandenburg, German Empire
- Died: 30 September 2004 (aged 93); Greifenberg, Bavaria, Germany
- Occupation: Art director
- Years active: 1949–1990 (film & TV)

Mathias Matthies (August 7, 1911 – September 30, 2004) was a German art director. He designed the sets for around a hundred films and television programs. He often collaborated with his wife Ellen Schmidt, including on some Edgar Wallace adaptations made by Rialto Film.

== Selected filmography ==
- Dangerous Guests (1949)
- Derby (1949)
- My Wife's Friends (1949)
- Unknown Sender (1950)
- The Allure of Danger (1950)
- Abundance of Life (1950)
- The Shadow of Herr Monitor (1950)
- Dark Eyes (1951)
- The Sinful Border (1951)
- My Wife Is Being Stupid (1952)
- Shooting Stars (1952)
- Wedding in Transit (1953)
- The Bogeyman (1953)
- Men at a Dangerous Age (1954)
- Don't Worry About Your Mother-in-Law (1954)
- Doctor Solm (1955)
- I Was an Ugly Girl (1955)
- My Children and I (1955)
- Father's Day (1955)
- The Old Forester House (1956)
- The First Day of Spring (1956)
- The Girl from the Marsh Croft (1958)
- Crime After School (1959)
- The Merry War of Captain Pedro (1959)
- Yes, Women are Dangerous (1960)
- The Forger of London (1961)
- The Last Chapter (1961)
- The Green Archer (1961)
- The Inn on the River (1962)
- Aurora Marriage Bureau (1962)
- The Happy Years of the Thorwalds (1962)

== Bibliography ==
- Bergfelder, Tim (2005) [2004]. International Adventures: German Popular Cinema and European Co-productions in the 1960s. New York: Berghahn Books. ISBN 978-1-57181-539-2.
