= Siegfried Franz =

German composer

- Born: 14 August 1913; Mannheim, German Empire
- Died: 18 March 1998 (aged 84); Hamburg, Germany
- Occupation: Composer
- Years active: 1951-1981 (film & TV)

Siegfried Franz (1913–1998) was a German composer of film and television scores.

== Selected filmography ==
- Canaris (1954)
- Three Birch Trees on the Heath (1956)
- The Doctor of Stalingrad (1958)
- Escape from Sahara (1958)
- Night Nurse Ingeborg (1958)
- Doctor Crippen Lives (1958)
- The Girl from the Marsh Croft (1958)
- Dorothea Angermann (1959)
- Carnival Confession (1960)
- The Last Chapter (1961)
- The Liar (1961)
- Beloved Impostor (1961)
- The Happy Years of the Thorwalds (1962)
- Angels of the Street (1969)
- Heidi (1978)

== Bibliography ==
- Greco, Joseph. The File on Robert Siodmak in Hollywood, 1941-1951. Universal-Publishers, 1999.
