= Artists' Blood =

1949 film

- Directed by: Wolfgang Wehrum
- Written by: Ellen Fechner; Peter Hamel; Wolfgang Wehrum
- Starring: Hans Richter; Dorit Kreysler; Fritz Odemar
- Cinematography: Kurt Hasse; Reimar Kuntze
- Edited by: Wolfgang Wehrum
- Music by: Lotar Olias
- Production companies: Komet-Film-Compagnie; Ondia-Filmproduktion
- Distributed by: Ring-Film
- Release date: 26 August 1949
- Running time: 96 minutes
- Country: West Germany
- Language: German

Artists' Blood (German: Artistenblut) is a 1949 West German comedy film directed by Wolfgang Wehrum, starring Hans Richter, Dorit Kreysler and Fritz Odemar. It was shot at the Wandsbek Studios in Hamburg and on location in mountain resort town of Garmisch-Partenkirchen. The film's sets were designed by the art directors Kurt Herlth and Carl Ludwig Kirmse.

== Synopsis ==
A successful clown wants to marry the daughter of a factory owner, but his prospective father-in-law doesn't want a circus performer in the family and insists that he takes a job at the factory. With a heavy heart he agrees, but then discovering a doppelganger he persuades him to take his place. Confusion soon arises between them.

== Cast ==
- Hans Richter as Clown Antonio & Anton Lammbein
- Dorit Kreysler as Lissy Schilling - Dolmetscherin
- Fritz Odemar as Steffens - Fabrikbesitzer
- Karin Jacobsen as Hannelore - seine Tochter
- Hubert von Meyerinck as Ricardo Pisetti - Manager
- Josef Sieber as Canossa - Garderobier
- Alexis as Liebling - Inspizient
- Petra Unkel as Gesine Pagel
- Luise Franke-Booch as Mutter Lammbein
- Hans Leibelt as Schröder - Portier im 'Continental'
- Carl Voscherau as Portier im 'Hotel Roß'
- Grethe Weiser as Die Vortragskünstlerin
- Walter Giller

== Bibliography ==
- Baer, Hester. Dismantling the Dream Factory: Gender, German Cinema, and the Postwar Quest for a New Film Language. Berghahn Books, 2012.
