= Love Premiere =

1943 film directed by Arthur Maria Rabenalt

- German: Liebespremiere
- Directed by: Arthur Maria Rabenalt
- Written by: Géza von Cziffra; Ellen Fechner; Willy Clever; Ralph Benatzky
- Produced by: Walter Tost
- Starring: Hans Söhnker; Kirsten Heiberg; Fritz Odemar; Margot Hielscher
- Cinematography: Jan Roth
- Edited by: Ira Oberberg
- Music by: Franz Grothe
- Production company: Terra Film
- Distributed by: Deutsche Filmvertriebs
- Release date: 11 June 1943
- Running time: 88 minutes
- Country: Germany
- Language: German

Love Premiere (German: Liebespremiere) is a 1943 German comedy film directed by Arthur Maria Rabenalt and starring Hans Söhnker, Kirsten Heiberg and Fritz Odemar. The film's sets were designed by Robert Herlth.

The film is based on the stage play Axel an der Himmelstür, which was a great success for Zarah Leander and established her career as a leading actress in 1936. When Zarah Leander signed a film contract with UFA in Babelsberg in 1937, Kirsten Heiberg was invited to replace Leander on stage but declined. In 1943 Zarah Leander originally was the first choice to recreate her role on the silver screen but she left Germany in the midst of 1943 to return to her native Sweden. Thus Kirsten Heiberg could return to the screen after a film interdiction of two years. Her husband Franz Grothe wrote all new songs for her and the film was a huge success. It is totally non-political and still one of the best German efforts to find its own kind of sophisticated comedy.

== Cast ==
- Hans Söhnker as KComposer Axel Berndt
- Kirsten Heiberg as Vera Warden, operetta singer
- Fritz Odemar as Werner Rombach, music publisher
- Margot Hielscher as Margit Thomas, dancer, Friend of Rombach
- Rolf Weih as Andreas Hansen, Librettist
- Charlott Daudert as Jenny, Vera's friend, Frau von Rolf
- Heinz Welzel as Rolf, lawyer
- Rudolf Schündler as director
- Maria Litto as Irene, Vera's girlfriend
- Fritz Böttger as Fred, singer
- Kurt Daehn as a stage worker in the revue
- Roswitha Knopf as Biggi, a 5-year-old child, called "Asterisk"
- Irmgard Petzold as Rombach's girlfriend
- Ernö René as Der Kapellmeister in der "Majestic Bar"
- Annegret Riffel as Frau Strohmacher, Vera's Garderobiere
- Walter Ringelwald as A well-known Vera's wedding guest
- Hans Sanden as Vera's costume consultant
- Walter Schenk as Vera's costume consultant
- Leo Sloma as a porter with Vera's suitcase
- Walter Steinweg as he stage manager
- Walter Stummvoll as the disappointed author
- Egon Vogel as the nude photographer from across the street
- Alexandra Weiß as a disturbed resident
- Rolf Welzel as Rolf, lawyer
- Ursula Voß
- Erika Weigt
- Erna Dörner-Götz
