= Carnival Confession =

1960 film

- Directed by: William Dieterle
- Written by: Kurt Heuser; Carl Zuckmayer (novel)
- Produced by: Dietrich von Theobald
- Starring: Hans Söhnker; Gitty Djamal; Götz George
- Cinematography: Heinz Pehlke
- Edited by: Carl Otto Bartning
- Music by: Siegfried Franz
- Production company: UFA
- Distributed by: UFA
- Release date: 15 September 1960
- Running time: 97 minutes
- Country: West Germany
- Language: German

Carnival Confession (German: Die Fastnachtsbeichte) is a 1960 West German crime film directed by William Dieterle and starring Hans Söhnker, Gitty Djamal and Götz George.

It was made by the revived UFA company and was the veteran director Dieterle's penultimate cinema film and his last in his native Germany.

== Cast ==
- Hans Söhnker as Panezza
- Gitty Djamal as Viola
- Götz George as Clemens
- Friedrich Domin as Canon Henrici
- Christian Wolff as Jeanmarie
- Berta Drews as Frau Bäumler
- Hilde Hildebrand as Mme. Guttier
- Grit Boettcher as Bertel
- Ursula Heyer as Rosa
- Helga Schlack as Bettine
- Helga Tölle as Katharina
- Rainer Brandt as Ferdinand Bäumler
- Herbert Tiede as Merzbecher
- Wolfgang Völz
- Milena von Eckhardt as Frau Panezza
- Albert Bessler as Dr. Classen
- Harry Engel

== Bibliography ==
- Bock, Hans-Michael & Bergfelder, Tim. The Concise Cinegraph: Encyclopaedia of German Cinema. Berghahn Books, 2009.
