= Twelve Minutes After Midnight =

1939 film directed by Johannes Guter

- Directed by: Johannes Guter
- Written by: Günther Rossoll; Otto Bernhard Wendler; Georg Zoch
- Starring: Geraldine Katt; Ursula Herking; René Deltgen
- Cinematography: Werner Krien
- Edited by: Johanna Rosinski
- Music by: Rudolf Perak
- Production company: UFA
- Distributed by: UFA
- Release date: 27 September 1939
- Running time: 87 minutes
- Country: Germany
- Language: German

Twelve Minutes After Midnight (German: Zwölf Minuten nach zwölf) is a 1939 German comedy crime film directed by Johannes Guter and starring Geraldine Katt, Ursula Herking and René Deltgen. It was shot at the Tempelhof Studios in Berlin. The film's sets were designed by the art director Herbert Frohberg.

== Synopsis ==
In Stockholm a young female law student investigates a series of jewel thefts that have been baffling the police.

== Cast ==
- Geraldine Katt as Ingrid Barko
- Ursula Herking as Nelly Eklund
- René Deltgen as Niels Terström
- Carl Raddatz as Juwelenmakler Griffin
- Rudolf Platte as Karl Jensemann
- Paul Henckels as Juwelier Anders
- Boris Alekin as Betrunkener Ganove
- Wilhelm Althaus as Kommissar Svenson
- Walter Bechmann
- Paul Bildt as Gerichtsvorsitzender
- Hildegard Busse as Lydia Duval
- Werner Funck as Ganove
- Fred Goebel as Kriminalkommissar in Oslo
- Hanna Lussnigg as Susanne
- Gustav Mahncke as Michalski's Diener
- Carl Merznicht
- Manfred Meurer as Michalski's Komplize
- Hermann Meyer-Falkow as Wachbeamter bei Gericht
- Fridtjof Mjøen as John Williams
- Heinz Müller as Wirt der Ganovenkneipe
- Friedrich Ohse as Ganove
- Klaus Pohl as Gauner Collin
- Anton Pointner as Hock
- Alfred Pussert as Wachbeamter
- Arthur Reinhardt as Wachmann beim Juwelenraub
- Oscar Sabo as Zugschaffner
- Hermann Schröder as Zuschauer bei Gerichtsverhandlung
- Hugo Steinweg
- Eva Tinschmann as Pensionswirtin

== Bibliography ==
- Kreimeier, Klaus. The Ufa Story: A History of Germany's Greatest Film Company, 1918-1945. University of California Press, 1999.
