= The Bogeyman (1953 film) =

1953 West German crime comedy film

- Liselotte Pulver in a scene from the film
- Directed by: Carl Boese
- Written by: Rolf Dortenwald; Curth Flatow
- Produced by: Georg Dammann; Herbert Obscherningkat; Helmut Ungerland
- Starring: Liselotte Pulver; Hans Reiser; Harald Paulsen
- Cinematography: Walter Hrich
- Edited by: Erhart H. Albrecht
- Music by: Hans-Martin Majewski
- Production companies: Burg-Film; Porta-Film
- Distributed by: Europa-Filmverleih
- Release date: 4 September 1953
- Running time: 86 minutes
- Country: West Germany
- Language: German

The Bogeyman (German: Das Nachtgespenst) is a 1953 West German crime comedy film directed by Carl Boese and starring Liselotte Pulver, Hans Reiser, and Harald Paulsen. It was shot at the Wandsbek Studios in Hamburg. The film's sets were designed by art director Mathias Matthies.

== Plot ==
In the small English town of Blackmoor, a congress is being held by the "Millionaires' Association". In order to guarantee the well-heeled participants' safety, numerous private detectives are hired as security. Despite this massive protective presence, a clever gang of crooks who call themselves "The Night Ghost" manage to break into the hotel safe and steal considerable sums of money. This now calls the bright maid Trixie into action, who loves to devour crime novels and was just waiting to finally experience an exciting adventure herself.

Trixie immediately gets to work and conducts her own investigation. She is joined by up-and-coming author Conny Cooper who has already achieved some fame as a crime novelist. The two track down the thieves and put the gang, including the somewhat dumb crooks Ladislaus and Gustav, under lock and key. Trixie is given a lavish reward and has also won Conny Cooper's heart.

== Cast ==
- Liselotte Pulver as Trixie
- Hans Reiser as Conny Cooper
- Harald Paulsen as Ladislaus
- Elena Luber as Yvette
- Hubert von Meyerinck as Hoteldirektor
- Paul Verhoeven as Peppercorn
- Bully Buhlan
- Walter Gross as Gustav
- Heinz Klevenow as Tigerjim
- Bruno Klockmann as Butterfield
- Christine Mylius as Miss Moneymaker
- Hans Schwarz Jr. as Robby
- Josef Sieber
- Horst von Otto

== Bibliography ==
- Bock, Hans-Michael & Bergfelder, Tim. The Concise CineGraph. Encyclopedia of German Cinema. Berghahn Books, 2009.
