= Men at a Dangerous Age =

1954 film

- Directed by: Carl-Heinz Schroth
- Written by: Karin Jacobsen; Eberhard Keindorff (idea); Per Schwenzen; Johanna Sibelius (idea)
- Starring: Hans Söhnker; Liselotte Pulver; Annie Rosar
- Cinematography: Franz Weihmayr
- Edited by: Erhart H. Albrecht
- Music by: Hans-Martin Majewski
- Production company: Fama-Film
- Distributed by: NWDF
- Release date: 2 March 1954
- Running time: 85 minutes
- Country: West Germany
- Language: German

Men at a Dangerous Age (German: Männer im gefährlichen Alter) is a 1954 West German comedy film directed by Carl-Heinz Schroth and starring Hans Söhnker, Liselotte Pulver and Annie Rosar. It was shot at the Wandsbek Studios in Hamburg. The film's sets were designed by the art directors Mathias Matthies and Ellen Schmidt.

== Cast ==
- Hans Söhnker as Franz Volker
- Liselotte Pulver as Anna, sein Mündel
- Annie Rosar as Mau (Fräulein Mauritius)
- Wilfried Seyferth as Adam Kassner (Dichter)
- Ilse Bally as Lil Dewohl (Turnierreiterin)
- Günther Jerschke as Butz (Butzinzky, Sekretär)

== Bibliography ==
- Bock, Hans-Michael & Bergfelder, Tim. The Concise Cinegraph: Encyclopaedia of German Cinema. Berghahn Books, 2009.
