= The Bordello =

- Directed by: Alfred Weidenmann
- Written by: Henry Jaeger
- Starring: Karin Jacobsen; Herbert Fleischmann; Gisela Peltzer
- Cinematography: Ernst W. Kalinke
- Music by: Otto Schütt
- Production company: Studio Film
- Distributed by: Inter-Verleih Film
- Release date: 28 January 1971
- Running time: 92 minutes
- Country: West Germany
- Language: German

The Bordello (German: Das Freudenhaus) is a 1971 West German drama film directed by Alfred Weidenmann and starring Karin Jacobsen, Herbert Fleischmann and Gisela Peltzer.

== Cast ==
- Karin Jacobsen as Rosi
- Herbert Fleischmann as Leopold
- Gisela Peltzer as Frau Silberstein
- Gisela Trowe as Prostitute
- Paul Edwin Roth as Herr Silberstein
- Friedrich G. Beckhaus as Baumann
- Wolfgang Stumpf as Von Weber
- Monica Kaufmann as Wally
- Astrid Frank as Inge
- Ingrid Bucksetter as Sonja
- Eva Gelb as Dodo
- Christiane Maybach as Tilly
- Michael Büttner as Michael
- Mathias Einert as Egon
- Georg M. Fischer as Jonathan
- Wolfgang Giese as Siegfried
- Hans Hessling as Chess Player
- Manfred Reddemann as Karl
- Ernst-Günter Seibt as Willi
- Gerda Gmelin as Mutter Oberin
- Peter Ahrweiler

== Bibliography ==
- Goble, Alan. The Complete Index to Literary Sources in Film. Walter de Gruyter, 1999.
