= Kitty and the World Conference =

1939 film directed by Helmut Käutner

- Directed by: Helmut Käutner
- Written by: Stefan Donat (play); Helmut Käutner
- Starring: Hannelore Schroth; Fritz Odemar; Christian Gollong
- Cinematography: Willy Winterstein
- Edited by: Fritz Stapenhorst
- Music by: Michael Jary
- Production company: Terra Film
- Distributed by: Terra Film
- Release date: 25 August 1939
- Running time: 97 minutes
- Country: Germany
- Language: German

Kitty and the World Conference (German: Kitty und die Weltkonferenz) is a 1939 German comedy film directed by Helmut Käutner and starring Hannelore Schroth, Fritz Odemar and Christian Gollong. It is a screwball comedy set against the backdrop of an international peace conference. Following the outbreak of the Second World War, Propaganda minister Joseph Goebbels ordered it withdrawn from cinemas as it he felt it presented too favourable a view of Britain.

It was shot at the Babelsberg Studios in Berlin. The film's sets were designed by art director Max Mellin. The story was based on a play, which served as the basis for the 1956 remake Kitty and the Great Big World.

== Cast ==
- Hannelore Schroth as Kitty
- Fritz Odemar as Sir Horace Ashlin
- Christian Gollong as Piet Enthousen, Dutch journalist
- Maria Nicklisch as Irene Sorel
- Max Gülstorff as Tristan de Gavard
- Paul Hörbiger as Huber
- Charlott Daudert as Mimi
- Hermann Pfeiffer as Paillot
- Hubert von Meyerinck as Carter
- Helmut Weiss as Bradsley
- Leopold von Ledebur as Mason, British ministerial secretary
- Herbert Hübner as the Ministry of Economy of Coprador
- Wilhelm Bendow as French minister
- Harald Wolff as Collins, secretary of the British delegation
- Franz Arzdorf as Füßli, director of the Grand Hotel Eden
- Walter Bechmann
- Eugen Bodart
- Eduard Bornträger as the barman in the Eden Bar
- Fritz Busch
- Curt Cappi
- Wilhelm Egger-Sell
- Max Harry Ernst as the hairdresser of Enrico Palpiti
- Angelo Ferrari
- Charles Francois as a dancer in the Eden Bar
- Ali Ghito as a secretary
- Otto Klopsch
- Charlie Kracker
- Sigrid Kyra
- Gerda Lehner
- Walter Lieck
- Karin Luesebrink
- Vera Meyer
- Armin Münch as the waiter at the lake restaurant
- Margit Osterloh
- Leo Peukert as Enrico Palpiti, owner of the manicure salon
- Bertold Reissig
- Bert Schmidt-Maris as elevator attendant at the Grand Hotel Eden
- Beppo Schwaiger as the third doorman at the Grand Hotel
- Armin Schweizer
- Annemarie Schäfer as Erdely, journalist of the world press
- Rudolf Schündler as a radio reporter
- Gert Scott-Iversen as Ms. Holgerson, journalist of the world press
- Werner Stock as Neumeier, the second doorman at the Grand Hotel Eden
- Michael von Newlinsky as the headwaiter at the lake restaurant

== Bibliography ==
- Reimer, Robert C.; Reimer, Carol J. (2010). The A to Z of German Cinema. Scarecrow Press. ISBN 978-1-4617-3186-3.
