= Johnny Colt (film) =

1966 film

- Directed by: Giovanni Grimaldi
- Written by: Giovanni Grimaldi
- Produced by: Paolo Moffa
- Starring: Robert Woods; Elga Andersen
- Cinematography: Guglielmo Mancori
- Edited by: Roberto Perpignani
- Music by: Benedetto Ghiglia
- Release date: 1966
- Country: Italy

Johnny Colt (Italian: Starblack, German: Django – schwarzer Gott des Todes, also known as Black Star and Star Black) is a 1966 Italian-West German Spaghetti Western film co-written and directed by Giovanni Grimaldi and starring Robert Woods.

== Cast ==
- Robert Woods as Johnny 'Colt' Blyth
- Elga Andersen as Caroline Williams
- Franco Lantieri as Curry
- Harald Wolff as Thomas King
- Jane Tilden as Johnnyas' Mother
- Howard Ross as Jop
- Andrea Scotti as Sheriff
- Graham Sooty as Williams
- Rossella Bergamonti as Mrs. Forrester

== Production ==
The film was mainly shot in Jugoslavia. It was produced by Ambrosiana Cinematografica.

== Reception ==
Italian film critic Marco Giusti described the film as "a Zorro of sorts in western flavor, slightly violent and with a poor adventurous mood". Corriere della Sera film critic Vincenzo Buonassisi referred to it as unoriginal, and paired it with The Scarlet Pimpernel. Film historian Antonio Bruschini praised the film, referring to it as original and worthy of rediscovery.
