= Tran and Helle films =

Short films by Nazi German comedy duo

Tran and Helle (German: Tran und Helle) were a comedy duo of the Third Reich era, played by Ludwig Schmitz (Tran) (1884–1954) and Joseph "Jupp" Hussels (Helle) (1901–1984).

== History ==
From September 1939 the pair appeared in a number of weekly 2–3 minute short films, which usually accompanied Die Deutsche Wochenschau newsreels or feature films screened in cinema.

Tran was a bald, simple-minded, yet also shrewd and jovial character, whose frequent transgressions would run counter to the German war effort or security. In different episodes Tran would listen to the BBC, refuse to donate his accumulated kitsch scrap metal, or engage in black market activities. His friend Helle—taller, handsome and appearing to be more considered in judgement—served as the foil who would ultimately show his fellow Rhinelander the error of his ways. While Jews were portrayed as untrustworthy, the series lacked the heavy-handed antisemitism found in some other German film productions of the Nazi era.

Tran and Helle's shorts were discontinued in the fall of 1940, possibly due to the authorities becoming concerned that audiences might sympathise with the duped but essentially human Tran, who would on occasions utter ideas contrary to the Nazi regime. Schmitz was a member of the SS from 1 March 1934 and a member of the Nazi Party from May 1937, however he was barred from the German film industry from 1941 "due to unworthy behavior". It was only in the 1950s that the popular comedian was seen again in the West German cinema. He died of a heart attack in 1954.
