= Don't Worry About Your Mother-in-Law =

1954 film

- Directed by: Erich Engels
- Written by: Erich Engel; Paul Helwig; Otto-Heinz Jahn
- Produced by: Viktor von Struwe
- Starring: Grethe Weiser; Lonny Kellner; Claus Biederstaedt
- Cinematography: Günter Haase; Walter Partsch
- Edited by: Friedel Buckow; Ruth Sardowski
- Music by: Franz Schulz-Reichel
- Production company: Fono Film
- Distributed by: Deutsche London-Film
- Release date: 15 October 1954
- Running time: 88 minutes
- Country: West Germany
- Language: German

Don't Worry About Your Mother-in-Law (German: Keine Angst vor Schwiegermüttern) is a 1954 West German comedy film directed by Erich Engels and starring Grethe Weiser, Lonny Kellner and Claus Biederstaedt. It was shot at the Wandsbek Studios in Hamburg with sets designed by the art directors Mathias Matthies and Ellen Schmidt,

== Plot ==
Martin Hoffmann is an employee of the Günzlow tobacco company, where there are many pretty girls, above all the boss's secretary, Renate Winter, who has her eye on him. This in turn annoys his girlfriend Gisela Steinberg. To reel him in, she tells him she is pregnant. He is very receptive to the idea of getting married, as he loves her too. Only Mathilde Steinberg, Gisela's mother and caring wife of the music professor Steinberg, is against the marriage because she sees no future for the two of them due to their low income. But because of the lie about the expected child, she agrees. Since the young couple does not yet have their own apartment, they have to live in a furnished room with their parents. Martin is bothered by his father-in-law's piano lessons as well as his mother-in-law's constant interference in their affairs. When they rent an apartment and borrow money to furnish it, they soon find themselves overindebted.

When Gisela talks to her friend Lily, she finds a way out of the precarious situation that Martin doesn't need to know about. A friend of her named Mayer, a hosiery manufacturer, is looking for models and he pays very well. So it doesn't take long before Gisela brings home the first 50 marks of self-earned money and gives it to Martin, explaining it as a lottery win. Still believing in her pregnancy, Martin buys a used stroller without thinking about the furniture installments still outstanding. A crisis ensues when he finds out where the money really comes from and that no baby is coming; he is also suspicious of her relationship with the hosiery manufacturer. At some point he is heartbroken and Gisela moves back to her parents. The next step is to contact a divorce lawyer.

After a while Gisela realizes that her love for her husband is still very strong. She secretly returns to their apartment to bring about a reconciliation. Expecting to see him lonely and unhappy, she finds him in Renate Winter's company. Gisela rushes away, offended again. But Renate had only come to see if things were going right. Eventually Gisela and Martin get back together and are soon expecting a baby.

== Cast ==
- Grethe Weiser as Mathilde Steinberg
- Lonny Kellner as Gisela Steinberg
- Claus Biederstaedt as Martin Hoffmann
- Paul Westermeier as Direktor Günzlow
- Walter Janssen as Professor Steinberg
- Marianne Wischmann as Renate Winter
- Bum Krüger as Direktor Meyer
- Beppo Brem as Fritz Fränkel
- Helga Braend as Helga Steinberg
- Ursula Herking
- Roland Kaiser as Herbert Steinberg
- Ingrid Lutz as Lilly
- Maria Paudler
- Erich Ponto
- Ruth Stephan
- Hubert von Meyerinck

== Bibliography ==
- Bock, Hans-Michael & Bergfelder, Tim. The Concise CineGraph. Encyclopedia of German Cinema. Berghahn Books, 2009.
