= The Merry War of Captain Pedro =

1959 film

- Directed by: Wolfgang Becker
- Written by: Curth Flatow; Hans Heinrich; Hans Raspotnik
- Produced by: Kurt Ulrich
- Starring: Carlos Thompson; Corny Collins; Boy Gobert
- Cinematography: Willy Winterstein
- Edited by: Wolfgang Flaum
- Music by: Herbert Jarczyk; Lotar Olias
- Production company: Berolina Film
- Distributed by: Constantin Film
- Release date: 2 October 1959
- Running time: 99 minutes
- Country: West Germany
- Language: German

The Merry War of Captain Pedro (German: Der lustige Krieg des Hauptmann Pedro) is a 1959 West German historical comedy film directed by Wolfgang Becker and starring Carlos Thompson, Corny Collins and Boy Gobert. It was shot in Agfacolor at the Bendestorf Studios near Hamburg. The film's sets were designed by the art directors Mathias Matthies and Ellen Schmidt.

== Synopsis ==
At the beginning of the eighteenth century, during the reign of Leopold I, a tax revolt breaks out in the Habsburg Empire. The Emperor needing cash to fund his foreign war has imposed a demand a levy of 5,000 thalers on the small town of Trutzingen, but the locals refuse to pay. The dashing soldier Pedro Bastiano is sent in with troops to impose the levy, but he prefers holdings parties and dances to forcing the money from the locals, and falls in love with a local woman. His young daughter also forms a romantic attachment of her own.

== Cast ==
- Carlos Thompson as Pedro Bastiano, Hauptmann
- Corny Collins as Charlotte, seine Tochter
- Boy Gobert as Eduard von Persipan, Obrist
- Loni Heuser as Ludmilla Haberstroh, Marketenderin
- Helga Martin as Ernestine, ihre Tochter
- Ursula von Borsody as Steffi, seine Tochter
- Wolfgang Neuss as Willibald Pauke, Kanonier
- Wolfgang Müller as Hiernoymus Schaber, Kanonier
- Hubert von Meyerinck as Moritz von Persipan, Kriegsminister
- Ernst Waldow as Ernst-August Mörseburg, Apotheker
- Rolf Wanka as Leopold I
- Peter Lehmbrock as Wachtmeister
- Werner Stock as Prinz Eugen
- Horst Beck as Adlerwirt

== Bibliography ==
- Bock, Hans-Michael & Bergfelder, Tim. The Concise CineGraph. Encyclopedia of German Cinema. Berghahn Books, 2009.
- Klossner, Michael. The Europe of 1500–1815 on film and television. McFarland & Co, 2002.
