= The Young Count =

- Directed by: Carl Lamac
- Written by: Dinah Nelken; Hans H. Zerlett
- Produced by: Robert Leistenschneider; Artur Hohenberg; Alfred Zeisler; Carl Lamac; Anny Ondra
- Starring: Anny Ondra; Hans Söhnker; Fritz Odemar
- Cinematography: Otto Heller; Otto Martini
- Edited by: Ella Ensink
- Music by: Leo Leux
- Production companies: Ondra-Lamac-Film; UFA
- Distributed by: UFA
- Release date: 9 December 1935
- Running time: 91 minutes
- Countries: Czechoslovakia; Germany
- Language: German

The Young Count (German: Der junge Graf) is a 1935 Czech-German comedy film directed by Carl Lamac and starring Anny Ondra, Hans Söhnker and Fritz Odemar. It is set around the circus, part of a subgenre of Circus films. It was shot at the Tempelhof Studios in Berlin. The film's sets were designed by the art directors Wilhelm Depenau and Erich Zander.

== Cast ==
- Anny Ondra as Billy
- Hans Söhnker as Hans Flint
- Fritz Odemar as Josua
- Hans Junkermann as Graf Prießnitz
- Jakob Tiedtke as Notar
- Karl Platen as Professor Dodereit
- Irmgard Novac as Marianne Dodereit
- Paul Heidemann as Billys Vater
- Josef Reithofer as Hotelportier
- Lilian Bergo as Schlangenmädchen
- Walter von Allwoerden
- Ernst Behmer as Zirkusangestellter
- Erwin Biegel as Saxophonspieler
- Carl Jönsson as Jäger
- Paul Rehkopf
- Peter Lau as Gärtner
- Heinrich Kalnberg
- Ruth Fischer as Solotänzerin

== Bibliography ==
- Bock, Hans-Michael & Bergfelder, Tim. The Concise CineGraph. Encyclopedia of German Cinema. Berghahn Books, 2009.
- Klaus, Ulrich J. Deutsche Tonfilme: Jahrgang 1935. Klaus-Archiv, 1988.
