= Men Are That Way =

1939 film directed by Arthur Maria Rabenalt

- Film poster
- German: Männer müssen so sein
- Directed by: Arthur Maria Rabenalt
- Written by: Hans Joachim Beyer; Peter Kirsten
- Based on: Men Are That Way by Heinrich Seiler
- Produced by: Walter Tost
- Starring: Hertha Feiler; Hans Söhnker; Hans Olden
- Cinematography: Ewald Daub
- Edited by: Helmuth Schönnenbeck
- Music by: Michael Jary
- Production company: Terra Film
- Distributed by: Terra Film
- Release date: 16 March 1939
- Running time: 100 minutes
- Country: Germany
- Language: German

Men Are That Way (German: Männer müssen so sein) is a 1939 German drama film directed by Arthur Maria Rabenalt and starring Hertha Feiler, Hans Söhnker and Hans Olden. The film's sets were designed by the art director Willi Herrmann. It was remade by Rabenalt in Austria as Arena of Fear (1959).

== Plot ==
An attractive female dance student becomes involved in the circus world, falls in love and takes it up professionally.

== Cast ==
- Hertha Feiler as Beatrice Rasmussen
- Hans Söhnker as Ruda, Dompteur
- Hans Olden as Cameron, Kunstschütze
- Paul Hörbiger as Dody, Musik-Clown

... and in alphabetical order:

- Lída Baarová
- James Bachert as Negerjunge
- Günther Ballier as detective commissioner
- Walter Bechmann as Ein Freund Karl Rasmussens
- Kurt Bierbaum as Zirkusangestellter
- Fritz Böttger as Pinelli
- Elma Czell as Daisy, Trapezartistin
- Charlott Daudert as Frieda
- Jac Diehl as Zirkusangestellter
- Mia Elmenhorst as Program seller
- Max Harry Ernst as Circus employee
- Arthur Fritz Eugens as Willi - Dody's son
- Han Fongkeng as Tierwärter Shing
- Karl Harbacher as Humphrey
- Mohamed Husen as Ein Gast im Lokal
- Hilla Höfer as Ursula
- Victor Janson as Gerlach, Zirkus-Regisseur
- Käthe Jöken-König as Elsie Meyer, Friedas Zimmervermieterin
- Alfred Karen as Zuschauer bei Camerons letztem Auftritt
- Josef Keim as Kren, Zirkusdirektor
- Maria Loja as Kantinenwirtin
- Paul Luka as Raubtierwärter
- Günther Lüders as Franz
- Die Metropol Vocalisten as Singers
- Karl-Heinz Peters as Dr. Kramer, Zirkusarzt
- Ilse Petri as Direktions-Sekretärin
- Klaus Pohl as Karusselbesitzer
- Gustav Püttjer as Plakatverteiler
- Ferdinand Robert as Logengast
- Ernst G. Schiffner as Rolf Hinz
- Margarete Schön as Frau Petersen
- Hans Stiebner as Der spanische Zirkusartist mit der Clownnummer
- Egon Stief as Zuschauer bei Camerons letztem Auftritt
- Theo Stolzenberg as Direktor der Friedrichshallen
- Georg Tressler as student
- Albert Venohr as Kriminalkommissar
- Edith von Donat as ballerina
- Christine von Trümbach
- Fredy Walden as Zuschauer bei Camerons letztem Auftritt
- Hansi Wendler as ballerina
- Max Wilmsen as Wirt
- Eugen Wolff as Band Leader
- Erich Ziegel as Rasmussen, Beatrice's father
