= The Forger (1928 film) =

1928 film

- Directed by: G. B. Samuelson
- Written by: Edgar Wallace
- Starring: Nigel Barrie; Lillian Rich; James Raglan; Winter Hall
- Production company: British Lion
- Distributed by: Ideal Films
- Release date: December 1928
- Running time: 7,305 feet
- Country: United Kingdom
- Languages: Silent; English intertitles

The Forger is a 1928 British silent crime film directed by G. B. Samuelson and starring Nigel Barrie, Lillian Rich and James Raglan. It is based on the 1927 novel The Forger by Edgar Wallace. It was made at Southall Studios.

== Cast ==
- Nigel Barrie as Doctor Cheyne Wells
- Lillian Rich as Jane Leith
- James Raglan as Peter Clifton
- Winter Hall as John Leith
- Sam Livesey as Inspector Rouper
- Derrick de Marney as Basil Hale

== See also ==
- The Forger of London (1961)

== Bibliography ==
- Low, Rachel. The History of British Film: Volume IV, 1918–1929. Routledge, 1997.
