= The Forger (Wallace novel) =

1927 novel by Edgar Wallace

- First edition
- Author: Edgar Wallace
- Language: English
- Genre: Crime
- Publisher: Hodder and Stoughton
- Publication date: 1927
- Publication place: United Kingdom
- Media type: Print

The Forger is a 1927 crime novel by the British writer Edgar Wallace.

== Film adaptations ==
- In 1928 a British silent film The Forger was made, based on the novel.
- In 1961 the book served as the inspiration for the German film The Forger of London, part of a long-running series of Wallace adaptations.

== Bibliography ==
- Bergfelder, Tim. International Adventures: German Popular Cinema and European Co-Productions in the 1960s. Berghahn Books, 2005.
