= Wolfgang Wehrum =

German film editor and director

- Born: 5 September 1907; Essen, German Empire
- Died: 25 October 1971 (aged 64); West Berlin, West Germany
- Occupations: Editor; Director
- Years active: 1934-1970

Wolfgang Wehrum (1907–1971) was a German film editor and director. He edited the 1947 film In Those Days (1947), amongst the first German films tackling the country's recent Nazi past.

== Selected filmography ==
=== Editor ===
- The Red Rider (1935)
- Flowers from Nice (1936)
- A Hoax (1936)
- The Irresistible Man (1937)
- Travelling People (1938)
- Diesel (1942)
- The Master of the Estate (1943)
- Under the Bridges (1946)
- In Those Days (1947)
- The Original Sin (1948)
- Royal Children (1950)
- Hit Parade (1953)
- Southern Nights (1953)
- Spy for Germany (1956)
- It Happened Only Once (1958)
- Court Martial (1959)
- The Last Witness (1960)
- Three Men in a Boat (1961)
- The White Spider (1963)
- A Holiday Like Never Before (1963)
- The Threepenny Opera (1963)
- The Inn on Dartmoor (1964)
- Lana, Queen of the Amazons (1964)
- Duel at Sundown (1965)

=== Assistant director ===
- Maria Ilona (1939)
- Under the Bridges (1946)
- Bombs on Monte Carlo (1960)

=== Director ===
- Artists' Blood (1949)

== Bibliography ==
- Langford, Michelle. Germany: Directory of World Cinema. Intellect Books, 2012.
