= Fritz Böttger =

German actor, film director and screenwriter

- Born: 7 August 1902; Gera, German Empire
- Died: 1 November 1981 (aged 79); Munich, West Germany
- Occupations: Actor, Director, Screenwriter
- Years active: 1938–1969 (film)

Fritz Böttger (7 August 1902–1 November 1981) was a German actor, screenwriter and film director.

== Selected filmography ==
=== Actor ===
- Escape in the Dark (1939)
- Men Are That Way (1939)
- The Three Codonas (1940)
- Love Premiere (1943)
- My Wife Theresa (1943)
- Titanic (1943)
- Nights on the Nile (1949)
- When Men Cheat (1950)

=== Writer ===
- The Orplid Mystery (1950)
- The Forester's Daughter (1952)
- Pension Schöller (1952)
- The Landlady of Maria Wörth (1952)
- Lavender (1953)
- Mask in Blue (1953)
- Love and Trumpets (1954)
- Father's Day (1955)
- The Beautiful Master (1956)
- The Hunter from Roteck (1956)
- The Beggar Student (1956)
- The Count of Luxemburg (1957)
- Just Once a Great Lady (1957)
- The Blue Sea and You (1959)
- Hula-Hopp, Conny (1959)
- The Forester's Daughter (1962)

=== Director ===
- The Bachelor Trap (1953)
- On the Green Meadow (1953)
- Horrors of Spider Island (1960)

== Bibliography ==
- John Howard Reid. Science-fiction & Fantasy Cinema: Classic Films of Horror, Sci-fi & the Supernatural. 2007.
