= The Forger of London =

1961 film

- Directed by: Harald Reinl
- Written by: Johannes Kai
- Based on: The Forger by Edgar Wallace
- Produced by: Horst Wendlandt
- Starring: Karin Dor; Hellmut Lange; Siegfried Lowitz
- Cinematography: Karl Löb
- Edited by: Hermann Ludwig
- Music by: Martin Böttcher
- Production company: Rialto Film
- Distributed by: Constantin Film
- Release date: 15 August 1961
- Running time: 93 minutes
- Country: West Germany
- Language: German

The Forger of London (German: Der Fälscher von London) is a 1961 West German crime film directed by Harald Reinl and starring Karin Dor, Hellmut Lange and Siegfried Lowitz. It is an adaptation of Edgar Wallace's 1927 novel The Forger, and part of a long-running series of German Wallace films made during the decade.

== Cast ==
- Karin Dor as Jane Clifton, née Leith
- Hellmut Lange as Peter Clifton, née Welerson
- Siegfried Lowitz as chief inspector Bourke
- Mady Rahl as Marjorie Wells
- Walter Rilla as John Leith
- Robert Graf as Basil Hale
- Joseph Offenbach as Henry Blonberg
- Ulrich Beiger as Inspector Rouper
- Otto Collin as lawyer Radloff
- Sigrid von Richthofen as Mrs. Anderson
- Eddi Arent as neighbor Stone
- Viktor de Kowa as Dr. Donald Wells
- Horst Breitkreuz as warden
- Günter Hauer as cab driver
- Günther Jerschke as lawyer Radloff / radio commentator (voice)
- Heidrun Kussin as maid Mary
- Hans Lohfing as butler James
- Günter Lüdke as civil servant Wislow
- Wolfgang Merling as police driver
- Werner Reinisch as Hopkins
- Annelies Schmiedel as servant Anna
- Horst Uhse as organist Miller
- Willy Wiesgen as porter

== Production ==
The film is an adaptation of Edgar Wallace's novel The Forger. The opening credit says the novel title is "The Bank Note Forger".

The movie was shot at the Wandsbek Studios in Hamburg, with location shooting at Herdringen Castle. The sets were designed by the art directors Mathias Matthies and Ellen Schmidt.

== Release ==
The FSK gave the film a rating of 16 and up and found it not appropriate for screenings on public holidays.

It premiered on 15 August 1961 at the Neues Bavaria cinema at Aachen.

== See also ==
- The Forger (1928)

== Bibliography ==
- Bergfelder, Tim (2005) [2004]. International Adventures: German Popular Cinema and European Co-productions in the 1960s. New York: Berghahn Books. ISBN 978-1-57181-539-2.
