= The Rabanser Case =

1950 film

- Hans Söhnker and Inge Landgut
- Directed by: Kurt Hoffmann
- Written by: S.P. Walther; Kurt Werner
- Produced by: Rolf Meyer
- Starring: Hans Söhnker; Richard Häussler; Carola Höhn
- Cinematography: Albert Benitz
- Edited by: Martha Dübber
- Music by: Werner Eisbrenner
- Production company: Junge Film-Union Rolf Meyer
- Distributed by: National-Filmverleih
- Release date: 19 September 1950
- Running time: 75 minutes
- Country: West Germany
- Language: German

The Rabanser Case (German: Der Fall Rabanser) is a 1950 West German crime film directed by Kurt Hoffmann and starring Hans Söhnker, Richard Häussler, and Carola Höhn. The film's sets were designed by the art director Franz Schroedter. It was shot at the Bendestorf Studios outside Hamburg.

== Synopsis ==
A journalist comes under suspicion of murder.

== Cast ==
- Hans Söhnker as Peter Rabanser
- Richard Häussler as Polizeikommissar Schelling
- Carola Höhn as Dorothea Rabanser
- Inge Landgut as Steffie
- Ilse Steppat as Baronin Felten
- Paul Dahlke as Dr. Georg Rabanser
- Harald Paulsen as Kriminalassistent Vogel
- Franz Schafheitlin as Polizeirat
- Albert Hehn as Taxi-Chauffeur Otto Krause
- Erna Sellmer
- Inge Meysel as Bruni
- Herta Scheel
- Willi Rose as Esche
- Werner Riepel as Sass
- Hans Zesch-Ballot as Verlagsdirektor
- Helmuth Helsig
- Josef Dahmen as Herr Imhoff

== Bibliography ==
- Bergfelder, Tim (2005) [2004]. International Adventures: German Popular Cinema and European Co-Productions in the 1960s. New York: Berghahn Books. ISBN 978-1-57181-539-2.
