= This Man Belongs to Me =

1950 film

- Directed by: Paul Verhoeven
- Written by: Carl Friedrich Lustigh
- Produced by: Rolf Meyer
- Starring: Winnie Markus; Gustav Fröhlich; Heidemarie Hatheyer
- Cinematography: Igor Oberberg
- Edited by: Martha Dübber
- Music by: Werner Eisbrenner
- Production company: Junge Film-Union Rolf Meyer
- Distributed by: Neue Filmverleih
- Release date: 14 March 1950
- Running time: 96 minutes
- Country: West Germany
- Language: German

This Man Belongs to Me (German: Dieser Mann gehört mir) is a 1950 West German comedy film directed by Paul Verhoeven and starring Winnie Markus, Gustav Fröhlich and Heidemarie Hatheyer. It was shot at the Bendestorf Studios outside Hamburg and on location in Hamburg. The film's sets were designed by the art director Erich Grave.

== Cast ==
- Winnie Markus as Gretl Fänger
- Gustav Fröhlich as Dr. Wilhelm Löhnefink
- Heidemarie Hatheyer as Fita Busse
- Gretl Schörg as Rita Andersen
- Wilfried Seyferth as Paul Fänger
- Albert Florath as Dr. Stichnot
- Rudolf Platte as Karl Dewoka
- Hans Schwarz Jr. as Walter Welling
- Gustl Busch as Freifrau von Königsfeld

== Bibliography ==
- Hans-Michael Bock and Tim Bergfelder. The Concise Cinegraph: An Encyclopedia of German Cinema. Berghahn Books, 2009.
