= Hannele's Journey to Heaven =

1922 film directed by Urban Gad

- German: Hanneles Himmelfahrt
- Directed by: Urban Gad
- Written by: Gerhart Hauptmann (play); Willy Rath
- Starring: Margarete Schlegel; Margarete Schön; Hermann Vallentin
- Cinematography: Karl Hasselmann
- Production company: Terra Film
- Distributed by: Terra Film
- Release date: 10 April 1922
- Running time: 105 minutes
- Country: Germany
- Languages: Silent; German intertitles

Hannele's Journey to Heaven (German: Hanneles Himmelfahrt) is a 1922 German silent film directed by Urban Gad and starring Margarete Schlegel, Margarete Schön and Hermann Vallentin. The film is based on the play The Assumption of Hannele by German author Gerhart Hauptmann. It was remade as a sound film in 1934.

== Plot ==
It is set in a small mountain village and tells the story of Hannele, an unhappy girl who is beaten by her stepfather and tries to commit suicide.

== Cast ==
- Margarete Schlegel as Hannele Mattern
- Margarete Schön as Johanna, Hannele's mother
- Hermann Vallentin as Mattern
- Theodor Loos as Teacher Gottwald
- Ernst Dernburg as Berger
- Hermine Sterler as Frau Berger
- Esther Hagan as Martha
- Fritz Richard as Heiber
- Walter Rilla as Angel of Death
- Hugo Döblin as Schmidt
- Emil Heyse as Dr. Wachler
- Maria Forescu
- Klaus Pohl
