= Benno Sterzenbach =

German actor (1916-1985)

- Born: March 3, 1916; Osnabrück, German Empire
- Died: September 13, 1985 (aged 69); Feldafing, West Germany
- Occupations: Actor, director

Benno Sterzenbach (born 3 March 1916 Osnabrück - died 13 September 1985 Feldafing) was a German cinema and theatre actor and director.

== Biography ==
His first major role on stage was Götz von Berlichingen at which he played next to Ellen Schwiers as Adelheid at the Jagsthausen festival. On television, he is mostly known for his roles in filmed theatrical adaptations: Der Richter und sein Henker (1957) by Friedrich Dürrenmatt, Der Schlaf der Gerechten (1962) by Albrecht Goes and Mirandolina (1963) by Carlo Goldoni.

Suspected of espionage due to his editorial relations, he was arrested by the Gestapo in 1941, and imprisoned for a month, during which time he protested his innocence. He was eventually freed after his case was expedited. This episode was repeated in a number of his plays.

With Paths in Twilight in 1948, he made his cinematic debut under the direction of Gustav Fröhlich. In 1960, he was in one of the first films by Edgar Wallace after the war: Der Rächer. In the same year, he was in Es ist soweit. In 1966, he acted alongside Heinz Reincke in one of the first German colour television series, Adrian der Tulpendieb.

After acting in 1962 in Max the Pickpocket with Heinz Rühmann, in 1964 he played the role of a doctor in Flug in Gefahr, a film which started a long series of films based on plane crashes.

Benno Sterzenbach found most success in the role of General Winston Woodrov Wamsler in Raumpatrouille – Die phantastischen Abenteuer des Raumschiffes Orion. After this, he was invited to series such as Die fünfte Kolonne, Derrick and The Old Fox.

In France, he is best known for his role as Major Achbach in La Grande Vadrouille with Louis de Funès and Bourvil. It was released under the title Don't Look Now... We're Being Shot At! in the United Kingdom and United States.

Benno Sterzenbach also wrote a number of books.

== Filmography ==
- 1948: Paths in Twilight - Stefan Kolb
- 1951: My Friend the Thief
- 1955: Operation Sleeping Bag - Offizier des SS
- 1955: The Cornet - Rittmeister Reningen
- 1959: Freddy unter fremden Sternen - Miller
- 1960: The Time Has Come (TV miniseries) - Lomax
- 1960: Der Rächer - Sir Gregory Penn
- 1962: Max the Pickpocket - Charly Gibbons
- 1964: Flug in Gefahr (TV film) - Dr. Frank Baird
- 1965: Doktor Murkes gesammelte Nachrufe (TV film) - Grosshack
- 1966: The Investigation (TV film) - Witness
- 1966: Adrian der Tulpendieb (TV miniseries) - Kapitän Josias
- 1966: Raumpatrouille – Die phantastischen Abenteuer des Raumschiffes Orion (TV miniseries) - General Wamsler
- 1966: La Grande Vadrouille (Die große Sause) - Major Achbach
- 1970: Pippi on the Run - Policeman
- 1982: L'As des as - Major Aschbach - Gestapo officer
- 1982: Unterwegs nach Atlantis (TV series) - Doctor Graf
- 1983: Hostage - Mr. Maresch
- 2003: Raumpatrouille Orion – Rücksturz ins Kino - General Winston Woodrow Wamsler (archive footage)
