= Inge Landgut =

German actress (1922–1986)

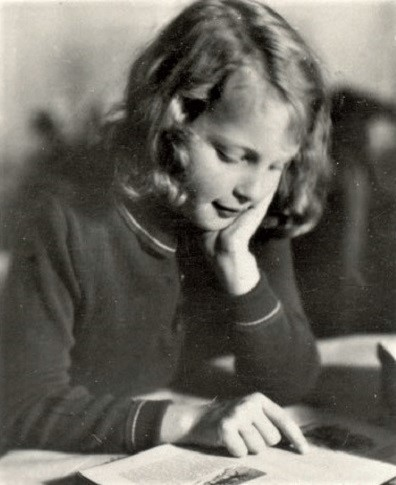
- Landgut at age 8
- Born: 23 November 1922; Berlin, Germany
- Died: 29 May 1986 (aged 63); West Berlin, West Germany
- Occupation: Actress
- Years active: 1928–1986
- Spouse: Werner Oelschlaeger (m. 1952; died 1980)

Inge Landgut (23 November 1922 – 29 May 1986) was a German actress. She is probably best remembered for playing Pony Hütchen in Emil and the Detectives and as the child murder victim Elsie Beckmann in Fritz Lang's classic M; both films were released in 1931. Landgut continued her acting career into adulthood, making both film and television appearances.

During her later years, Inge Landgut also worked frequently in the German voice-dubbing business. She provided the German voice for actresses like Lois Maxwell as Miss Moneypenny in the James Bond films and Barbara Bel Geddes as Miss Ellie Ewing from Dallas. She was also the German voice of Wilma in The Flintstones and voiced figures in Disney classics like Dumbo, Lady and the Tramp and One Hundred and One Dalmatians.

Inge Landgut was married to director and actor Werner Oehlschläger (1904–1980) from 1952 until his death.

== Partial filmography ==
- Violantha (1927) – Fini
- Angst (1928)
- Indizienbeweis (1929) – Stella
- Perjury (1929) – Elschen Sperber
- A Mother's Love (1929) – Mädi Verena, Dienstmädchen
- Women on the Edge (1929) – Inge, Kind
- The Unusual Past of Thea Carter (1929) – Inge Carter
- Phantoms of Happiness (1930) – Madeleine
- Emil and the Detectives (1931) – Pony Hütchen
- Bookkeeper Kremke (1930) – Kremke's Younger Daughter
- M (1931) – Elsie Beckmann
- Louise, Queen of Prussia (1931) – Mädchen
- Hanneles Himmelfahrt (1934) – Hannele
- Lessons in Love (1935)
- Love Can Lie (1937)
- The Girl of Last Night (1938)
- What Now, Sibylle? (1938) – Primanerin
- Schneeweißchen und Rosenrot (1938)
- Women Are Better Diplomats (1941)
- Gaspary's Sons (1948) – Christine
- I'll Never Forget That Night (1949) – Lucie
- Our Daily Bread (1949) – Inge Webers
- Thirteen Under One Hat (1950) – Inge Schumann
- The Rabanser Case (1950) – Steffie
- Hilfe, ich bin unsichtbar (1951) – Ilse Sperling
- Torreani (1951) – Marianne
- Full House (1952) – Gisella (segment "Je suis un tendre")
- Ist Mama nicht fabelhaft? (1958)
- Jedermannstraße 11 (1962–1965, TV series) – Frau Riedel
- Doppelgänger (1971, TV series) – Tante Mathilde
- Tadellöser & Wolff (1975, TV movie) – Herta de Bonsac
- Ein Mann will nach oben (1978, TV series) – Frau Zappow
- Iron Gustav (1979, TV mini-series) – Mutter Quaas
- Ein Kapitel für sich (1979–1980, TV mini-series) – Herta de Bonsac
- Star Without a Sky (1980)
- Der Fall Maurizius (1981, TV mini-series)
- Schneeweißchen und Rosenrot (1984) – Mother

== Bibliography ==
- Youngkin, Stephen D. (2005). The Lost One: A Life of Peter Lorre. Lexington: University Press of Kentucky. ISBN 978-0-8131-7185-2.
