= New Year's Eve on Alexanderplatz =

1939 film

- Directed by: Richard Schneider-Edenkoben
- Written by: Richard Schneider-Edenkoben
- Produced by: Helmut Schreiber; Franz Tappers
- Starring: Hannes Stelzer; Carl Raddatz; Jutta Freybe
- Cinematography: Friedl Behn-Grund
- Edited by: Kurt Hampp
- Music by: Ernst Erich Buder
- Production company: Majestic Film
- Distributed by: Tobis Film
- Release date: 3 March 1939
- Running time: 86 minutes
- Country: Germany
- Language: German

New Year's Eve on Alexanderplatz (German: Silvesternacht am Alexanderplatz) is a 1939 German drama film directed by Richard Schneider-Edenkoben and starring Hannes Stelzer, Carl Raddatz and Jutta Freybe. It was shot at the Johannisthal Studios in Berlin and on location in the city. The film's sets were designed by the art directors Emil Hasler and Fritz Lück.

== Synopsis ==
Amidst the joyous New Year's Eve celebrations on Alexanderplatz, a man named Reinhardt feels suicidal. However, as he observes the various dramas of those he encounters that evening, he develops a better appreciation of life.

== Cast ==
- Hannes Stelzer as Dr. Storp
- Carl Raddatz as Reinhardt
- Jutta Freybe as Ilse Hewegh
- Karl Martell as Fred Delken
- Jakob Tiedtke as Herr Schebke
- Gertrud Wolle as Frau Schebke
- Hilde Hildebrand as Madeleine
- Lotte Rausch as Frau Zenge
- Aribert Wäscher as Pistor
- Ellen Bang as Gerda
- Otto Wernicke as Gast im 'Elite'
- Josef Dahmen as Anton Lingenfelder
- Hans Paetsch as Rudi Lingenfelder
- Bruno Hübner as Schnitzereienverkäufer
- Hans Richter as Klingenberg
- Oscar Sabo as Schupo

== Bibliography ==
- Klaus, Ulrich J. Deutsche Tonfilme: Jahrgang 1939. Klaus-Archiv, 1988.
- Wilson, Christopher S. & Erk, Gul Kacmaz . Reframing Berlin: Architecture, Memory-Making and Film Locations. Intellect Books, 2023.
