= The Orplid Mystery =

1950 film directed by Helmut Käutner

- Directed by: Helmut Käutner
- Written by: Robert A. Stemmle; Fritz Böttger; Helmut Käutner; Artur Brauner
- Produced by: Artur Brauner
- Starring: Horst Caspar; Bettina Moissi; O.E. Hasse
- Cinematography: Werner Krien
- Edited by: Johanna Meisel
- Music by: Bernhard Eichhorn
- Production company: CCC Films
- Distributed by: Allianz Filmverleih
- Release date: 29 September 1950
- Running time: 91 minutes
- Country: West Germany
- Language: German

The Orplid Mystery or Epilogue (German: Epilog: Das Geheimnis der Orplid) is a 1950 West German thriller film directed by Helmut Käutner and starring Horst Caspar, Bettina Moissi, and O.E. Hasse. The film did not perform well at the box office on its release.

It was made at the Spandau Studios of CCC Films. The film's sets were designed by the art director Emil Hasler.

== Cast ==
- Horst Caspar as Reporter Peter Zabel
- Bettina Moissi as Malaienmädchen Leata
- O.E. Hasse as Chefredakteur Dr. Mannheim
- Hans Leibelt as Cheflektor Kurt Beckmann
- Irene von Meyendorff as Christiane Bruckmann alias Conchita
- Hilde Hildebrand as Mrs. Eleanor Hoopman
- Jeanette Schultze as Lore Bruckmann, Conchitas Schwester
- Fritz Kortner as Mr. P. L. Hoopman
- Peter van Eyck as Steward Stefan Lund
- Hans Christian Blech as Martin Jarzombeck, Bräutigam
- Carl Raddatz as Pianist Aldo Siano
- Arno Assmann as Tänzer Ermanno
- Rolf von Nauckhoff as Pastor Johannes Klappstein
- Paul Hörbiger as Musik-Clown 'The Great Teatch'
- Arno Paulsen as Mr. Hill
- Hans Stiebner as Der Koch
- Horst Hächler as Klaus von Werth, Freund des Bräutigams
- Gustav Püttjer as Kapitän Feddersen
- Rolf Heydel as Hans Toysen, Lores Freund
- Reinhard Kolldehoff as Funker
- Horst Breitenfeld as Matrose
- Peter Marx as Maschinist
- Helmut Bautzmann as Matrose
- Rochus Langkau as Maschinist
- Claus Schulz as Schiffsjunge
- Camilla Spira as Pensionswirtin
- Blandine Ebinger as Sekretärin Auskunftsbüro
- Thea Thiele as Verkäuferin
- Traute Baumbach as Bardame
- Maria Besendahl as Schiffsjunge
- Helmuth Helsig as Drobitsch
- Erwin Biegel as Detektiv
- Harro ten Brook as Maler Phil Urban
- Adrian Hoven
- Curtis Kreuger
- Carl Kuhlmann
- Helmut Käutner as Meteorologe
- Willi Seemann as Funker 2
- Ilse Werner

== Bibliography ==
- Bergfelder, Tim (2005) [2004]. International Adventures: German Popular Cinema and European Co-Productions in the 1960s. New York: Berghahn Books. ISBN 978-1-57181-539-2.
- Davidson, John; Hake, Sabine (2009). Framing the Fifties: Cinema in a Divided Germany. New York: Berghahn Books. ISBN 978-1-84545-536-1.
