= The Sensational Casilla Trial =

1939 film

- Directed by: Eduard von Borsody
- Written by: Ernst von Salomon; Eduard von Borsody; Robert Büschgens
- Based on: The Sensational Casilla Trial by Hans Mahner-Mons
- Produced by: Erich Holder
- Starring: Heinrich George; Jutta Freybe; Albert Hehn
- Cinematography: Werner Bohne
- Edited by: Hilde Grebner
- Music by: Werner Bochmann
- Production company: UFA
- Distributed by: UFA
- Release date: 22 September 1939
- Running time: 109 minutes
- Country: Germany
- Language: German

The Sensational Casilla Trial (German: Sensationsprozess Casilla) is a 1939 German crime drama film directed by Eduard von Borsody and starring Heinrich George, Jutta Freybe and Albert Hehn. It was shot at the Berlin studios of Carl Froelich and on location around the city. The film's sets were designed by the art director Carl Ludwig Kirmse. It is considered an anti-American propaganda film attacking the American way of life, partly due to its closeness to Britain with which Germany went to war the same year.

== Synopsis ==
On a flight from Dakar to Casablanca when the two pilots have fallen ill, the prisoner Peter Roland is called into action to fly into safely. Roland is a young German his way to face trial for the kidnapping and murder of the child star Binnie Casilla in 1928. In gratitude for saving him and his daughter Jessie during the flight, the top lawyer Vandegrift agrees to organise his legal defence in the trial in New York City. He makes it clear that Binnie's manipulative stepmother Sylvia had made her life a misery, exploiting her popular fame for her own financial benefit. Roland had taken Binnie away, but only to her out of her mother's clutches and away to safety. Jessie, by now in love with Roland, travels to South America to fetch the now adult Binnie to produce her in court. The sharp-witted Vandegrift is then able to overcome Sylvia's protests that the young woman is not the same as the kidnapped child.

== Cast ==
- Heinrich George as M. Vandegrift, Rechtsanwalt
- Jutta Freybe as Jessie, seine Tochter
- Albert Hehn as Peter Roland
- Dagny Servaes as Sylvia Casilla
- Siegfried Schürenberg as James, ihr Dienter
- Richard Häussler as Adams, öffentlicher Ankläger
- Erich Fiedler as Salvini
- Hans Mierendorff as Richter Corbett
- Herbert Weissbach as Sprecher des Gerichts
- Ernst Stimmel as Gerichtsarzt
- Alice Treff as Almar Galliver
- Leo Peukert as Generaldirektor Pick
- Karl Klüsner as Präsident des Appelationsgericht
- Käte Pontow as Binnie Casilla als Mädchen
- Lissy Arna as Inez Brown
- Renée Stobrawa as Fräulein Baumann
- Valy Arnheim as Ramsay MacFarlane
- Josef Dahmen as Vergifteter Co-Pilot
- Fritz Eckert as Vergifteter Pilot
- Robert Forsch as Mr. Parker
- Walter Lieck as Rundfunkreporter
- Otz Tollen as Polizeiinspektor vor Gericht
- Willi Rose as Fremdenführer
- Angelo Ferrari as Verkäufer der Imbissbude

== Bibliography ==
- Garden, Ian. The Third Reich's Celluloid War. History Press, 2011.
- Hull, David Stewart. Film in the Third Reich: Art and Propaganda in Nazi Germany, Simon & Schuster, 1973.
- Klaus, Ulrich J. Deutsche Tonfilme: Jahrgang 1939. Klaus-Archiv, 1988.
- Kreimeier, Klaus. The Ufa Story: A History of Germany's Greatest Film Company, 1918-1945. University of California Press, 1999.
- Welch, David. Propaganda and the German Cinema, 1933-1945. I.B.Tauris, 2001.
