= Margarete Slezak =

Austro-German singer and actress (1901–1953)

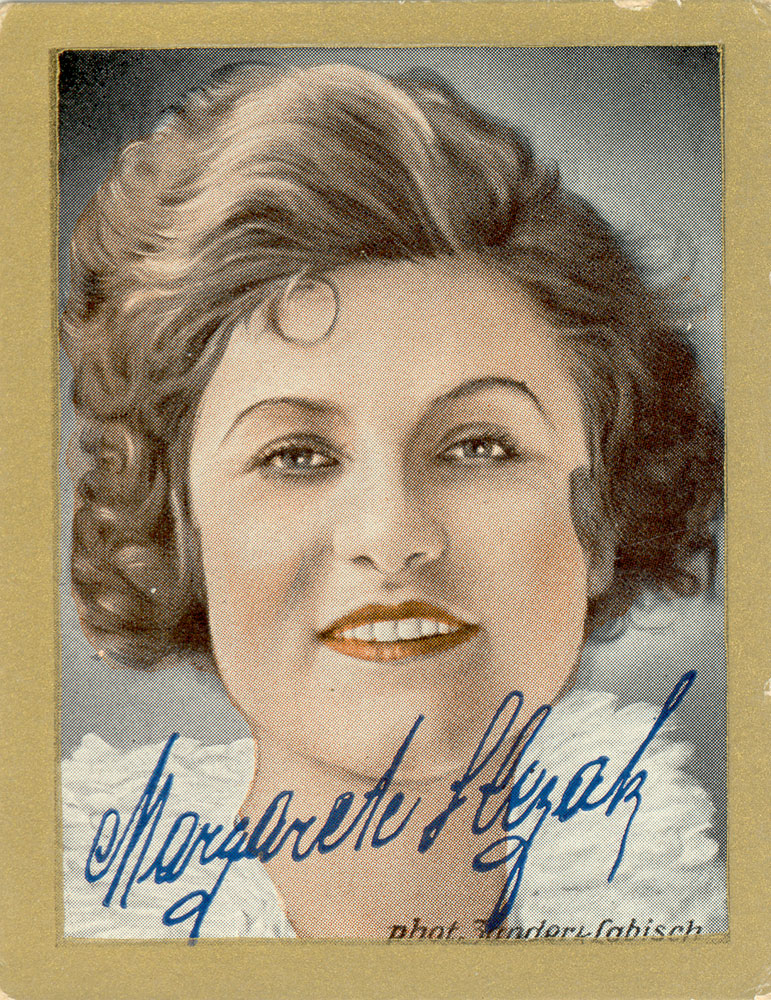
- Born: 9 January 1901; Breslau, German Empire
- Died: 30 August 1953 (aged 52); Rottach-Egern, Bavaria, West Germany
- Occupation: Actress
- Years active: 1928–1953
- Parent(s): Leo Slezak; Elsa Wertheim
- Relatives: Walter Slezak (brother); Erika Slezak (niece)

Margarete Slezak (9 January 1901 – 30 August 1953) was an Austro-German singer and actress. She was the sister of the actor Walter Slezak.

== Selected filmography ==
- Derby (1949)
- King for One Night (1950)
- Abundance of Life (1950)
- The Csardas Princess (1951)
- Maya of the Seven Veils (1951)
- One Night's Intoxication (1951)
- Shame on You, Brigitte! (1952)
- The Flower of Hawaii (1953)
- Under the Stars of Capri (1953)
- Not Afraid of Big Animals (1953)

== Bibliography ==
- Richard Newman & Karen Kirtley. Alma Rosé: Vienna to Auschwitz. Amadeus Press, 2000.
