= Karl Heinz Stroux =

German actor and director (1908–1985)

- Born: Karl-Heinz Stroux; 25 February 1908; Hamborn, Germany
- Died: 2 August 1985 (aged 77); Düsseldorf, Germany
- Education: Schauspielschule of the Volksbühne theatre
- Occupations: Actor; Film director; Theatre director; Theatre manager
- Known for: Director of the Düsseldorfer Schauspielhaus

Karl Heinz Stroux (25 February 1908 – 2 August 1985) was a German actor, film and theatre director, and theatre manager. As the director of the Düsseldorfer Schauspielhaus from 1955 to 1972 he opened the new building in 1970.

== Career ==
Born Karl-Heinz Stroux, the son of a physician, in Hamborn (now a district in the city of Duisburg), he studied in Berlin, history and philosophy until 1930. Parallel, he studied acting at the Schauspielschule of the Volksbühne theatre. From 1928 to 1930 he worked as an assistant to stage directors Karlheinz Martin and Jürgen Fehling, and as an actor. From 1930 to 1934 he worked at several Berlin theatres including Deutsches Theater and the Theater am Schiffbauerdamm where he staged Eugene O'Neill's Alle Kinder Gottes haben Flügel as a studio production. By the late 1940s he had been a senior director at several German theatres including ones in Darmstadt, Berlin (Hebbel-Theater) and Wiesbaden. From 1951 to 1955 he was the senior director at Berlin's Schiller Theater and Schlosspark Theater. At the Schlosspark, he directed the German premiere of Samuel Beckett's Waiting for Godot in 1953 with the author in the audience.

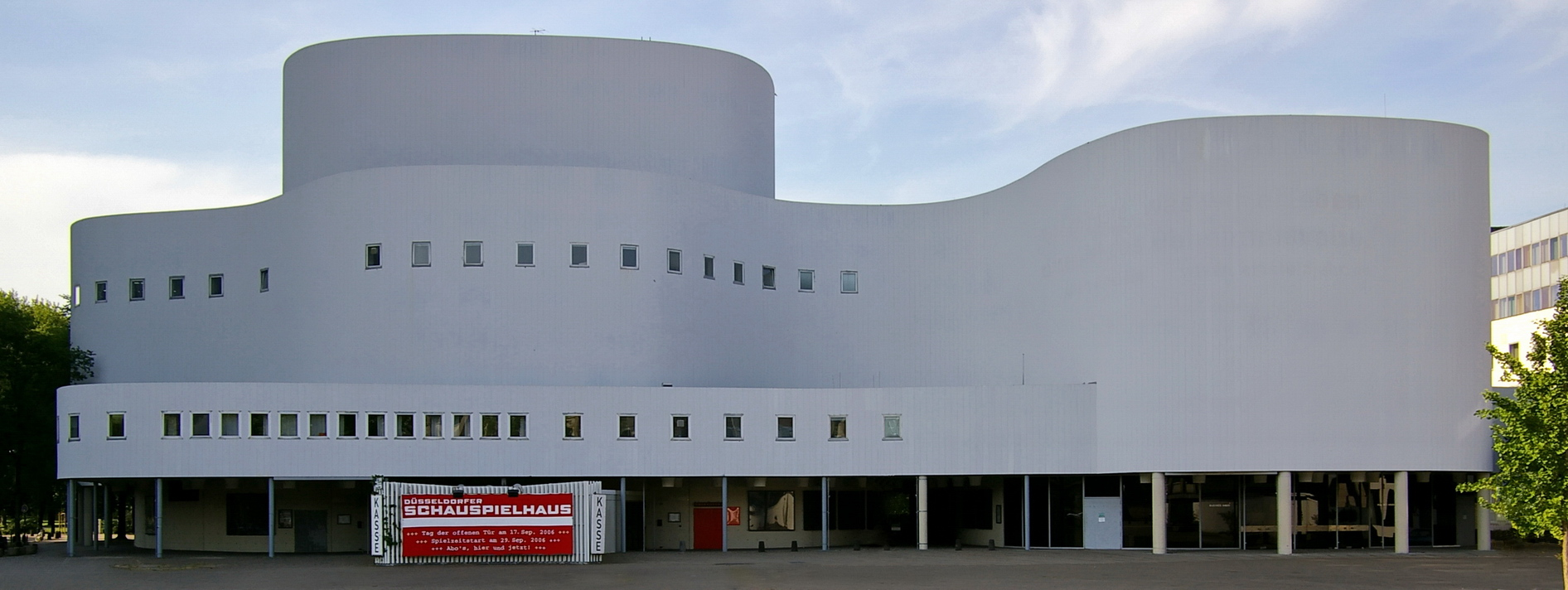
Düsseldorfer Schauspielhaus, where Stroux was Generalintendant from 1955 to 1972

In 1955 he succeeded Gustaf Gründgens as Generalintendant of the Düsseldorfer Schauspielhaus. He staged the premiere in German of Beckett's Happy Days in Düsseldorf in 1961. He also worked closely with the playwrights Eugène Ionesco and Heinrich Böll. His actors included Bernhard Minetti and Ernst Schröder, Elisabeth Bergner, Elisabeth Flickenschildt, Paula Wessely, Ernst Deutsch and Fritz Kortner. His production of Ionesco's Der König stirbt was performed in the first Berliner Theatertreffen (Berlin theatre meeting) in 1964. He also staged works by Arthur Miller and Sławomir Mrożek. During his era, a new building of the Düsseldorfer Schauspielhaus was built that he opened in 1970. Occasionally he still acted, for example as narrator in Shakespeare's Perikles at age 77.

Stroux died in Düsseldorf. His sons pursued similar careers: Thomas Stroux (born 1943) is also a theatre director, and Stephan Stroux (born 1945) is also an artist, theatre director and an actor. On the occasion of his centenary in 2008, Düsseldorf arranged an exhibition of his 50 years of work for the theatre.

== Filmography ==
- 1931: M (actor)
- 1939: Morgen werde ich verhaftet (director)
- 1949: The Great Mandarin (writer, director)
- 1949: Encounter with Werther (director)
- 1961: Wir sind noch einmal davongekommen (director)
- 1962: Vor Sonnenuntergang (director)
- 1968: Das Käthchen von Heilbronn (director)
- 1970: Triumph des Todes oder Das große Massakerspiel (director)
- 1984: Die Dame und die Unterwelt (actor)
