= Jutta Freybe =

German actress (1917–1971)

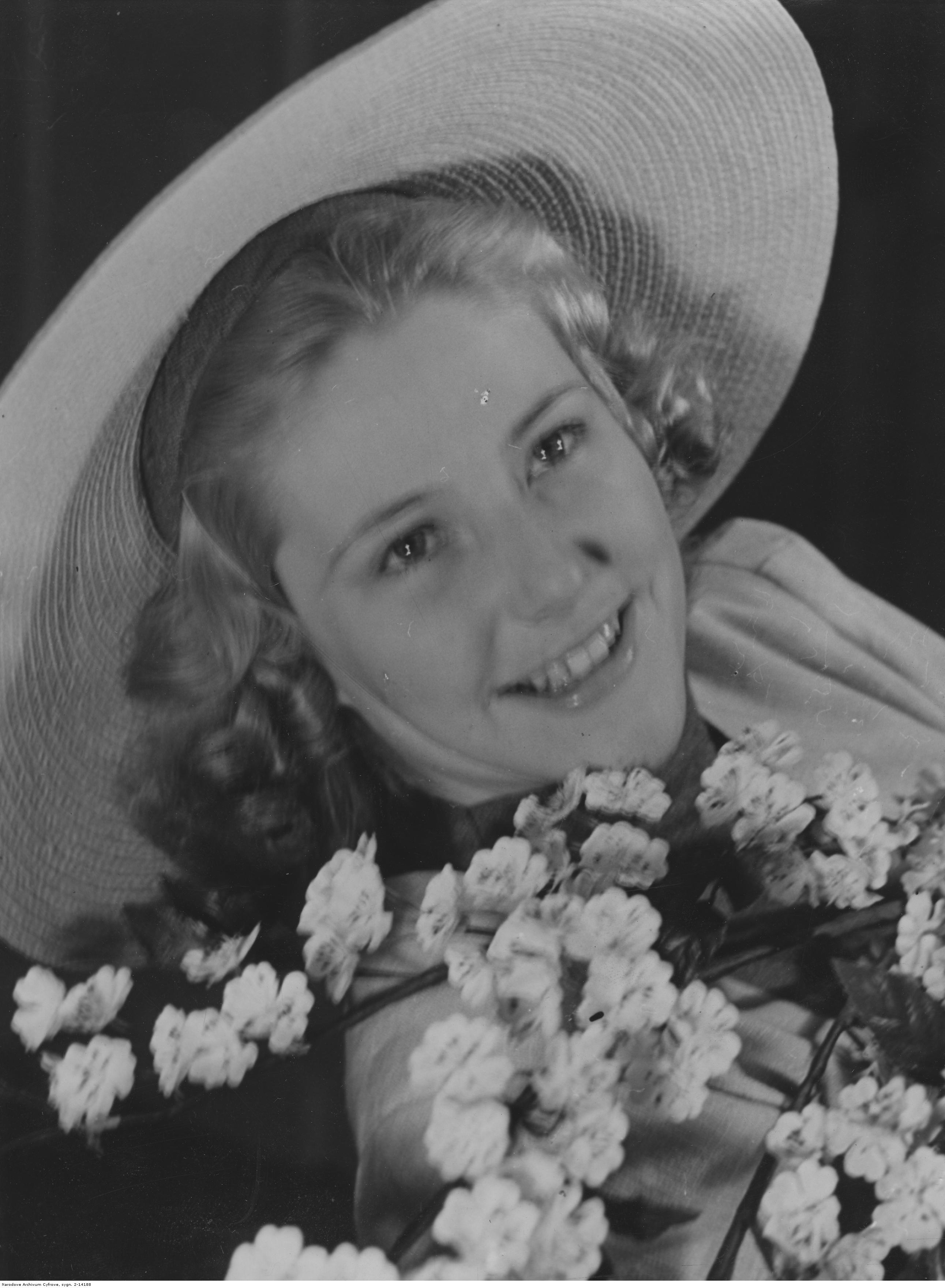
- Born: 11 September 1917; Berlin, Brandenburg; German Empire
- Died: 28 February 1971 (aged 53); Büsum, Schleswig-Holstein; West Germany
- Occupation: Actress
- Years active: 1934–1943 (film)

Jutta Freybe (1917–1971) was a German stage and film actress. She appeared in ten films during the Nazi era, in leading roles.

Her sisters were the writers Johanna Sibelius and Martha Albrand.

== Selected filmography ==
- Love Can Lie (1937)
- Between the Parents (1938)
- What Now, Sibylle? (1938)
- New Year's Eve on Alexanderplatz (1939)
- The Sensational Casilla Trial (1939)
- Alarm at Station III (1939)
- The Golden Spider (1943)

== Bibliography ==
- Giesen, Rolf. Nazi Propaganda Films: A History and Filmography. McFarland, 2003.
