= Thirteen Under One Hat =

1950 film

- Directed by: Johannes Meyer
- Written by: Ernst Keienburg; Kurt E. Walter
- Based on: Gesellschaftsreise - alles inbegriffen by Paul Alfred Müller
- Produced by: Rolf Meyer
- Starring: Inge Landgut; Volker von Collande; Ruth Leuwerik
- Cinematography: Albert Benitz
- Edited by: Martha Dübber
- Music by: Lothar Brühne
- Production company: Junge Film-Union Rolf Meyer
- Distributed by: National Film
- Release date: 27 February 1950
- Running time: 90 minutes
- Country: West Germany
- Language: German

Thirteen Under One Hat (German: Dreizehn unter einem Hut) is a 1950 West German comedy film directed by Johannes Meyer and starring Inge Landgut, Volker von Collande and Ruth Leuwerik. It was shot at the Bendestorf Studios near Hamburg and on location around Bacharach, Assmannshausen, Kaub and Oberwesel in the Rhineland. The film's sets were designed by the art director Franz Schroedter. It is noted as marking the film debut of Leuwerik, a major star of postwar German cinema.

== Synopsis ==
Evelyne, the daughter of a wealthy industrialist, is in love with the car mechanic Wolfgang who runs a garage with his friends Inge and Rudi. He seemingly shows no interest but Evelyne persists to win over his affections. During a trip to the River Rhine with other friends, Evelyne follows and keeps committing minor acts of sabotage in order to bring Wolfgang and herself closer. Eventually he falls for her, while Inge finds love with Rudi.

== Cast ==
- Inge Landgut as Inge Schumann
- Volker von Collande as Wolfgang Huth
- Alfred Cogho as Rudi Finkenschlag
- Ruth Leuwerik as Evelyne Winterthur
- Ursula Grabley as Lydia Hempel
- Sigrid Pawelek as Evchen
- Loni Heuser as Minna Wiese
- Ursula Herking as Klara Hagemeister
- Arno Paulsen as Oskar Tielebein, Gerichtsvollzieher
- Harald Paulsen as Otto Bollmann
- Rudolf Platte as Ricardo Brause
- Klaus Marx as Er
- Gustel Gerhards as Sie
- Herta Worell as Lore
- Franz Schafheitlin as Eddi Winterthur
- Ludwig Schmitz as Jupp Baltes
- Kari Noller as Mariechen Balts
- Carl Voscherau as Bauer Beckers
- Hans D. Bove as Anton Beckers
- Kurt Fuß as Polizist Lemke
- Karl Kramer as Polizist Schröder II
- Herbert A.E. Böhme as Polizeihauptmann
- Joachim Rake as Geschäftsführer 'Fürstenhof'
- Werner Tackenberg as Hans Trompeter
- Josef Dahmen as Herr Fleischer
- Lotte Rausch as Frau Fleischer
- Richard Handwerk as Herr Mühlmann

== Bibliography ==
- Schulz, Günter. Ausländische Spiel- und abendfüllende Dokumentarfilme in den Kinos der SBZ/DDR, 1945-1966. Bundesarchiv-Filmarchiv, 2001.
