= Torreani =

1951 film

- Gustav Fröhlich and Lisa Stammer
- Directed by: Gustav Fröhlich
- Written by: Curt J. Braun
- Produced by: Hermann Brüning; Carl Froelich
- Starring: Gustav Fröhlich; René Deltgen; Inge Landgut
- Cinematography: Karl Löb; Fritz Arno Wagner
- Edited by: Liselotte Cochius
- Music by: Leo Leux
- Production company: Carl Froelich-Film
- Distributed by: Deutsche London-Film; Sascha Film (Austria)
- Release date: 23 November 1951
- Running time: 101 minutes
- Country: West Germany
- Language: German

Torreani is a 1951 West German drama film directed by Gustav Fröhlich and starring Fröhlich, René Deltgen and Inge Landgut.

The film's sets were designed by the art director Erich Kettelhut.

== Synopsis ==
The plot revolves around a variety show.

== Cast ==
- Gustav Fröhlich as Erich Holsten
- René Deltgen as Robert Torreani
- Inge Landgut as Marianne
- Lisa Stammer as Isabella
- Werner Stock as Conny Cleve
- Willi Rose as Koldewey
- Arno Paulsen as Bichler
- Rolf Weih as Homann
- Erna Sellmer as Francesca
- Walter Tarrach as Kriminalkommissar
- Paul Heidemann
- Paul Westermeier
- Otto Gebühr
- Victor Janson
- Erich Poremski as Kriminalkommissar
- Erwin Biegel
- Karin Luesebrink
- Hans Stiebner
- Ewald Wenck
- Carl de Vogt
- Karl Ludwig Schreiber
- Michael Symo
- Reinhold Pasch
- Hella Karsunki
- Consuelo Korn

== Bibliography ==
- Hans-Michael Bock and Tim Bergfelder. The Concise Cinegraph: An Encyclopedia of German Cinema. Berghahn Books, 2009.
