= Albert Benitz =

German cinematographer

- Born: 17 November 1904; Freiburg, Baden-Württemberg; German Empire
- Died: 11 March 1979 (aged 74); Hamburg, West Germany
- Occupation: Cinematographer
- Years active: 1926–1970 (film)

Albert Benitz (17 November 1904 – 11 March 1979) was a German cinematographer who worked on more than ninety films. He also directed the 1949 film Das Fräulein und der Vagabund. During the 1940s, he was under contract to Terra Film and worked with Leni Riefenstahl during the era.

== Selected filmography ==
- Milak, the Greenland Hunter (1928)
- The Son of the White Mountain (1930)
- Mountains on Fire (1931)
- Gently My Songs Entreat (1933)
- The Prodigal Son (1934)
- The Challenge (1938)
- The Fire Devil (1940)
- Gaspary's Sons (1948)
- Martina (1949)
- I'll Never Forget That Night (1949)
- The Rabanser Case (1950)
- Thirteen Under One Hat (1950)
- Taxi-Kitty (1950)
- The Allure of Danger (1950)
- Shooting Stars (1952)
- Weekend in Paradise (1952)
- Klettermaxe (1952)
- The Uncle from America (1953)
- Life Begins at Seventeen (1953)
- Not Afraid of Big Animals (1953)
- Red Roses, Red Lips, Red Wine (1953)
- The Private Secretary (1953)
- The Abduction of the Sabine Women (1954)
- My Sister and I (1954)
- The Big Star Parade (1954)
- The Devil's General (1955)
- Escape to the Dolomites (1955)
- Operation Sleeping Bag (1955)
- The False Adam (1955)
- Secrets of the City (1955)
- Bandits of the Autobahn (1955)
- A Heart Returns Home (1956)
- The Marriage of Doctor Danwitz (1956)
- The Captain from Köpenick (1956)
- Spy for Germany (1956)
- A Heart Returns Home (1956)
- Doctor Crippen Lives (1958)
- Father, Mother and Nine Children (1958)
- That Won't Keep a Sailor Down (1958)
- The Girl from the Marsh Croft (1958)
- Of Course, the Motorists (1959)
- Heaven, Love and Twine (1960)
- My Husband, the Economic Miracle (1961)
- Pichler's Books Are Not in Order (1961)
- The Terror of Doctor Mabuse (1962)
- Max the Pickpocket (1962)

== Bibliography ==
- Rainer Rother. Leni Riefenstahl: The Seduction of Genius. A&C Black, 2003.
