= The Golden Spider =

1943 film

- German: Die goldene Spinne
- Directed by: Erich Engels
- Written by: Erich Ebermayer; Erich Engels; Wolf Neumeister; Ulrich Vogel
- Produced by: Eduard Kubat
- Starring: Kirsten Heiberg; Jutta Freybe; Harald Paulsen; Otto Gebühr
- Cinematography: E.W. Fiedler
- Edited by: René Métain
- Music by: Werner Eisbrenner
- Production company: Terra Film
- Distributed by: Deutsche Filmvertriebs
- Release date: 23 December 1943
- Running time: 88 minutes
- Country: Germany
- Language: German

The Golden Spider (German: Die goldene Spinne) is a 1943 German thriller film directed by Erich Engels and starring Kirsten Heiberg, Jutta Freybe, and Harald Paulsen. It was partly shot in Amsterdam. The film's sets were designed by the art directors Franz Bi and Bruno Lutz.

== Cast ==
In alphabetical order

- Franz Arzdorf as train control inspector
- Wilhelm Bendow as the shameful guest of the "Red Mill"
- Traute Bengen as Das Mädchen der Pension "Riemer"
- Hermann Brix as Detective Commissioner Freise
- Robert Bürkner as Dr. Eberding of the Kattenbeck-Werke
- Conrad Cappi as the manager of the "Red Mill"
- Gerhard Dammann as doorman
- Karl Dannemann as Bumm, foreman
- Maly Delschaft as Rosa Sykora, Director of "Roten Mühle"
- Erich Dunskus as foreman of the Kattenbeck-Werke
- Jutta Freybe as Christa Fischer, family doctor
- Otto Gebühr as Geheimrat Fischer, Director of Kattenbeck-Werke
- Gerdi Gerdt as an employee at Kattenbeck-Werke
- Bernhard Goetzke as the senior staff doctor on the train
- Lutz Götz as Kriminalrat Vonhoff
- Kirsten Heiberg as Lisaweta, Agent, alias Agnes Jordan, cabaret singer
- Käte Jöken-König as the owner der Künstlerpension "Riemer"
- Paul Mederow
- Hellmuth Passarge as the entrance guard at the Kattenbeck-Werke
- Harald Paulsen as Smirnoff / Petersen, Agent
- Hermann Pfeiffer
- Werner Pledath as Heinsius, ein Direktor der Kattenbeck-Werke
- Klaus Pohl as the Ballet master at the "Red Mill"
- Claire Reigbert
- Liselotte Schaak as Fräulein von Holleben, secretary of the Privy Council
- Ernst Schlott as criminal secretary Zähringer
- Josef Sieber as Berger, Chauffeur at the Kattenbeck-Werke
- Walter Steinweg as a disabled soldier at the train station
- Jaspar von Oertzen as Kneisler, the guard at the factory entrance gate
- Ursula Voß as a worker at Kattenbeck-Werke
- Rolf Weih as Axel Rüdiger, engineer, fiancé of Christa Fischer
- Eduard Wenck as a factory worker
- Ewald Wenck as Kneisler, the guard at the factory entrance gate
- Anneliese Würtz as Mrs. Mieger, forewoman at the plant
