= Beloved Darling =

1943 film

- Directed by: Paul Martin
- Written by: Peter Groll; Paul Martin
- Based on: Babusch by Gábor Vaszary
- Produced by: Hans Tost
- Starring: Johannes Riemann; Dorit Kreysler; Sonja Ziemann
- Cinematography: Willi Kuhle; Jan Roth
- Edited by: Gertrud Hinz-Nischwitz
- Music by: Michael Jary
- Production company: Terra Film
- Distributed by: Deutsche Filmvertriebs
- Release date: 3 August 1943
- Running time: 92 minutes
- Country: Germany
- Language: German

Beloved Darling (German: Geliebter Schatz) is a 1943 German comedy film directed by Paul Martin and starring Johannes Riemann, Dorit Kreysler and Sonja Ziemann. It was shot partly at the Babelsberg Studios in Berlin. The film's sets were designed by the art directors Franz Bi and Bruno Lutz. It is based on the play Babusch by Hungarian writer Gábor Vaszary.

== Cast ==
- Johannes Riemann as Felix Eilers
- Dorit Kreysler as Eva
- Sonja Ziemann as Lette Eilers
- Ida Wüst as Frau Wittich
- Harald Paulsen as Herr Heoger
- Hilde Jansen as Frau Heoger
- Ernst Waldow as Herr Riemann
- Ursula Herking as Frau Reimann
- Ewald Wenck as Pedell Kielreiter
- Gertrud Wolle as Freulein Tante
- O.E. Hasse as Rechtsanwald
- Leo Slezak as Generaldirektor
- Sigrid Becker as Stubenmädchen
- Leo Peukert as Physiklehrer
- Maria Litto as Eine Dame, auf der Str, angsprochen

== Bibliography ==
- Klaus, Ulrich J. Deutsche Tonfilme: Jahrgang 1942. Klaus-Archiv, 1988.
- Moeller, Felix. The Film Minister: Goebbels and the Cinema in the Third Reich. Edition Axel Menges, 2000.
