= Horst Caspar =

German actor (1913–1952)

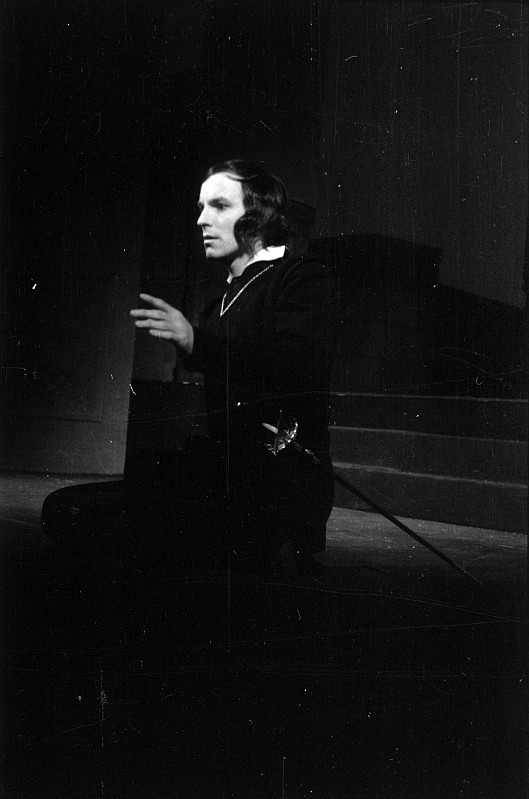
Horst Caspar

Horst Joachim Arthur Caspar (20 January 1913 – 27 December 1952) was a German actor, prominent in German theatre and film in the 1930s and 1940s. His postwar career was cut short by his sudden death at 39.

Caspar was born in Radegast, the son of Max Caspar, an army officer. He had one Jewish grandparent. His mother Emmy died when he was 18 months old, and he was raised by his aunt in Berlin. He attended the Treitschke-Reform-Realgymnasium in Berlin-Wilmersdorf. In 1932 he took his abitur (school leaving exam), but did not go to university, since he had already decided to be an actor. Caspar joined the Nazi Party in 1932 before Hitler took power, but left again in the same year.

He took acting lessons at the school of Ilka Grüning and Lucie Höflich, along with future stars of German cinema such as Lilli Palmer, Inge Meysel and Brigitte Horney. In the late 1930s Caspar, a handsome young man, appeared regularly in German films and on the stage. He was taken up by the director Saladin Schmitt and became a leading man at his theatre in Bochum, where he performed in plays by Shakespeare and Friedrich Schiller. When he gave his final performance in Richard II in 1939, he received 108 curtain calls.

Under the Nazi regime's anti-Jewish Nuremberg Laws, Caspar was classed as a Mischling (mixed race) of the second degree. Despite his part-Jewish ancestry, he continued to work as an actor. This was partly because he enjoyed the protection of Schmitt, who as a homosexual was no friend of the Nazi regime. But he also enjoyed the patronage of Propaganda Minister Joseph Goebbels. Goebbels personally vetted cases of part-Jewish performers and allowed a number of popular part-Jewish actors to continue working.

Caspar's first leading film role was as the young Schiller in Friedrich Schiller – The Triumph of a Genius. In 1940 Caspar joined one of the most important German theatres of the time, the Schiller Theatre in Berlin. In 1942 he performed at the prestigious Burgtheater in Vienna. This was regarded as a "rare and special privilege" for a part-Jewish actor in a city where all Jews had been purged from cultural life.

In 1943 Caspar was engaged by the director Veit Harlan to play the young August Neidhardt von Gneisenau, who in 1807 defended the Prussian fortress town of Kolberg against the French during the Napoleonic Wars, in Kolberg, an epic film produced on the orders of Goebbels. This was only Caspar's second leading film role, but it is the one for which he is now best remembered, despite the fact that film was finished only shortly before the end of World War II and was seen by few people at the time.

On 20 January 1944 Caspar married a 22-year-old actress Antje Weisgerber (1922–2004). She gave birth to a son and a daughter. After the end of the war Caspar moved to Düsseldorf where he again worked in the theatre and in films. His last role was as a reporter named Peter Zabel in crime film called The Orplid Mystery, produced in 1950. In 1952 he recorded an LP of poetry readings, including works by Schiller and Goethe. Caspar died suddenly in Berlin in December 1952 of a stroke at the age of 39. His son Frank died on the day of his father's funeral, aged eight. His widow had a successful film career extending into the 1970s. All three are buried at St Anne's churchyard in Berlin-Dahlem.

== Filmography ==
Year	Title	Role	Notes
1940	Friedrich Schiller – The Triumph of a Genius	Friedrich Schiller	
1945	Kolberg	Gen. Gneisenau	
1949	Encounter with Werther	Werther	
1950	The Orplid Mystery	Reporter Peter Zabel	(final film role)
