= Horst Breitenfeld =

German actor

Horst Breitenfeld (born 17. July 1924, Berlin-Schöneberg; died 9. July 2010, Nuremberg), was a German actor who specializes in dubbing.

== Biography ==
Breitenfeld was discovered by Gustav Knuth, receiving his first theater role at the Deutsches Schauspielhaus Hamburg in 1943. Following this he was employed by the Theater am Schiffbauerdamm in Berlin. Breitenfeld joined the ensemble of the Mannheim National Theatre after World War II, where he participated in a staging of Tell auf der Achterbahn, the first production after the theater was reopened. He received roles in Basel and Zürich, where he acted alongside director Friedrich Dürrenmatt in an adaption of his play The Visit, as well as Mannheim, again, and Dortmund. He worked in Nürnberg for 22 years and continued living there after his retirement. Breitenfeld seldom participated in movie or TV productions. His cinema career included Helmut Käutner‘s thriller The Orplid Mystery, as well as Arthur Maria Rabenalt‘s comedy Die Frau von gestern Nacht, Musik, Musik und nur Musik, alongside Walter Giller, Not Afraid of Big Animals alongside Heinz Rühmann and the movie adaptation of Carl Zuckmayer’s play The Devil's General. Breitenfeld appeared in TV movies, for example Der Nächste, bitte! (1953), Schweik in the Second World War and Rainer Erler‘s A Guru Comes, in mini-series, for instance Der seidene Schuh and TV series Die Firma Hesselbach.

As a voice actor Breitenfeld became known to a large audience as "Hoss Cartwright“ (Dan Blocker) in Bonanza, who he dubbed in the Hamburg versions, along with Michael Chevalier, Martin Hirthe and Thomas Braut, and in Blocker's appearances in Margret Dünser’s V.I.P.-Schaukel and the detective film Lady in Cement. Moreover, he dubbed "Ephraim Longstocking“ (Beppe Wolgers) in the TV adaptation of Pippi Longstocking and Pippi in the South Seas, Peter Ustinov in Hotel Sahara and Christopher Lee in Valley of Eagles.

Additionally, Breitenfeld participated in several audio dramas and radio productions, including The Grass Harp, NWDR 1952, based on Truman Capote’s novel, and as the „Luckdragon Falkor“ in the adaptation of Michael Endes Neverending Story“, KIOSK 1984.

== Filmography (selection) ==
- 1950: The Orplid Mystery
- 1950: Die Frau von gestern Nacht
- 1953: Not Afraid of Big Animals
- 1953: Der Nächste, bitte!
- 1955: The Devil's General
- 1955: Music, Music and Only Music
- 1955: Der Korporal aus Jav
- 1955: Operation Sleeping Bag
- 1961: Schweik in the Second World War
- 1962: Die Firma Hesselbach: Der Dieb
- 1965: Der seidene Schuh
- 1966: Der Richter von London
- 1976: Dorothea Merz
- 1980: A Guru Comes
