= Gaspary's Sons =

1948 film

- Directed by: Rolf Meyer
- Written by: Kurt E. Walter
- Produced by: Rolf Meyer
- Starring: Lil Dagover; Hans Stüwe; Inge Landgut
- Cinematography: Albert Benitz
- Edited by: Martha Dübber
- Music by: Werner Eisbrenner
- Production company: Junge Film-Union Rolf Meyer
- Distributed by: Willy Karp-Film; Hamburg-Film
- Release date: 26 October 1948
- Running time: 93 minutes
- Country: Germany
- Language: German

Gaspary's Sons (German: Die Söhne des Herrn Gaspary) is a 1948 German drama film directed by Rolf Meyer and starring Lil Dagover, Hans Stüwe and Inge Landgut. It was shot at the Bendestorf Studios near Hamburg and on location at Kleinwalsertal in western Austria. The film's sets were designed by the art director Erich Grave.

== Synopsis ==
In 1933, a family is divided when the father and one son emigrate to democratic Switzerland while the mother and other son remain in Nazi Germany. The two branches of the family develop along very different paths.

== Cast ==
- Lil Dagover as Margot von Korff
- Hans Stüwe as Robert Gaspary
- Anneliese von Eschstruth as Sylvia Genris
- Harald Holberg as Hans Gaspary
- Michael Tellering as Günther von Korff
- Inge Landgut as Christine
- Hans Zesch-Ballot as Dr. Grove
- Elise Aulinger as Frau Seelenmayr
- John Pauls-Harding as Pit
- Käte Pontow as Tinchen
- Walther Jung
- Katharina Mayberg

== Bibliography ==
- Bock, Hans-Michael & Bergfelder, Tim. The Concise Cinegraph: Encyclopaedia of German Cinema. Berghahn Books, 2009.
