= The Fourth Is Not Coming =

1939 film

- Directed by: Max W. Kimmich
- Written by: Max W. Kimmich; Charles Klein
- Produced by: Helmut Schreiber
- Starring: Ferdinand Marian; Werner Hinz; Dorothea Wieck
- Cinematography: Fritz Arno Wagner
- Edited by: Martha Dübber
- Music by: Otto Konrad
- Production company: Tobis Film
- Distributed by: Tobis Film
- Release date: 9 March 1939
- Running time: 90 minutes
- Country: Germany
- Language: German

The Fourth Is Not Coming (German: Der vierte kommt nicht) is a 1939 German mystery crime film directed by Max W. Kimmich and starring Ferdinand Marian, Werner Hinz and Dorothea Wieck. It was shot at the Johannisthal Studios in Berlin and on location in Stockholm. The film's sets were designed by the art directors Max Knaake, Bruno Lutz and Erich Grave. It marked the directoral debut of Kimmick, who was the brother-in-law of Joseph Goebbels.

== Synopsis ==
Three old school friends are waiting for the fourth member of their musical quartet to arrive, when he doesn't turn up they find his dead body at his apartment. He had been working at a bank in Stockholm where he was apparently embezzling funds and has committed suicide. To clear their old friend's good name, the three undertake an investigation themselves. Their suspicions fall on both a woman he had an affair with and an artist, but it is ultimately the bank's director - who seems so helpful - who committed the murder to conceal his own theft of the funds.

== Cast ==
- Ferdinand Marian as Generaldirektor Kolman
- Werner Hinz as Kapitän Holm
- Ernst Stimmel as Dr. Fredmark
- Franz Schafheitlin as Richter Tilenius
- Alexander Engel as Holmin, Privatsekretär
- Karl Fochler as Chautin, Kunstmaler
- Werner Scharf as Blomster - Kassier
- Dorothea Wieck as Dr. med. Irene Andersen
- Elisabeth Wendt as Frau Elle Fredmark
- Lina Lossen as Frau Svanborg
- Charlott Daudert as Anita, Blomstels Freundin
- Melitta Klefer as Frau Kröger - Pförtnerin
- Thea Fischer as Ihre Tochter
- Rosita Serrano as Singer

== Bibliography ==
- Hull, David Stewart. Film in the Third Reich: Art and Propaganda in Nazi Germany, Simon & Schuster, 1973.
- Klaus, Ulrich J. Deutsche Tonfilme: Jahrgang 1939. Klaus-Archiv, 1988.
- Schönfeld, Christiane Processes of Transposition: German Literature and Film. Rodopi, 2007.
