= Franz Arzdorf =

German actor (1904–1974)

- Born: 5 May 1904; Munich, Bavaria, German Empire
- Died: 24 April 1974 (aged 69); West Berlin, West Germany
- Occupation: Actor
- Years active: 1937-1966 (film)

Franz Arzdorf (5 May 1904 – 24 April 1974) was a German stage, film and television actor.

== Selected filmography ==
- Love Can Lie (1937)
- Dangerous Game (1937)
- Talking About Jacqueline (1937)
- A Night in May (1938)
- Men, Animals and Sensations (1938)
- A Girl Goes Ashore (1938)
- Secret Mission (1938)
- People Who Travel (1938)
- Kitty and the World Conference (1939)
- Escape in the Dark (1939)
- The Merciful Lie (1939)
- The Governor (1939)
- The Three Codonas (1940)
- Counterfeiters (1940)
- Friedemann Bach (1941)
- The Swedish Nightingale (1941)
- The Golden Spider (1943)
- Dark Eyes (1951)
- Mikosch Comes In (1952)
- Mailman Mueller (1953)

== Bibliography ==
- Wolfgang Jacobsen & Hans Helmut Prinzler. Käutner. Spiess, 1992.
