= Professor Nachtfalter =

1951 film

- Directed by: Rolf Meyer
- Written by: Paul Baudisch; Per Schwenzen; Kurt E. Walter; Joachim Wedekind
- Produced by: Rolf Meyer
- Starring: Johannes Heesters; Jeanette Schultze; Maria Litto
- Cinematography: Georg Bruckbauer
- Edited by: Martha Dübber
- Music by: Friedrich Schröder
- Production company: Junge Film-Union Rolf Meyer
- Distributed by: National-Film
- Release date: 23 February 1951
- Running time: 99 minutes
- Country: West Germany
- Language: German

Professor Nachtfalter is a 1951 West German comedy film directed by Rolf Meyer and starring Johannes Heesters, Jeanette Schultze and Maria Litto. The film's sets were designed by the art director Franz Schroedter. The film was made at the Bendestorf Studios and partly shot on location at Lake Constance. The film's sets were designed by the art director Franz Schroedter. It cost around 900,000 Deutschmarks to make.

== Synopsis ==
The male music teacher at a girls boarding school is far too popular with his female students, leading to his aunt, the headmistress, ordering him to get married. While in the city he gets entangled with a nightclub singer, who then enrolls at the school pretending to be a student.

== Cast ==
- Johannes Heesters as Professor Dr. Joachim Wendler
- Gisela Schmidting as Steffanie Walden
- Jeanette Schultze as Inez Almadez
- Margarete Haagen as Frau von Weinsberg
- Maria Litto as Tänzerin
- Ernst Waldow as Dr. Obermann
- Harald Paulsen as M. Philibert
- Franz Schafheitlin
- Albert Florath as Fährmann
- Victor Janson as Senor Almadez
- Maria Paudler as Senora Almadez
- Annelore Kunze
- Paul Westermeier
- Gerd Frickhöffer
- Helmut Peine as Schulpförtner
- Ingeborg Christiansen as Schülerin
- Helga Feddersen as Schülerin
- Andrea Grosske as Schülerin
- Carla Hagen as Schülerin
- Gisela Hebisch as Schülerin
- Christiane Jansen as Schülerin
- Marga Klappert as Schülerin
- Ursula von Manescul as Schülerin
- Hannelore Müller as Schülerin
- Ingrid Pankow as Schülerin
- Jutta Petrikowsky as Schülerin
- Friedl Rostock as Schülerin
- Gisela Tantau as Schülerin
- Petra Unkel as Schülerin
- Ingrid Andree as Schülerin
- Thea Weis as Schülerin
- Ilse Zielstorff as Schülerin

== Bibliography ==
- Bock, Hans-Michael & Bergfelder, Tim. The Concise CineGraph. Encyclopedia of German Cinema. Berghahn Books, 2009.
