= Winnie Markus =

Czechoslovakia-born German actress (1921–2002)

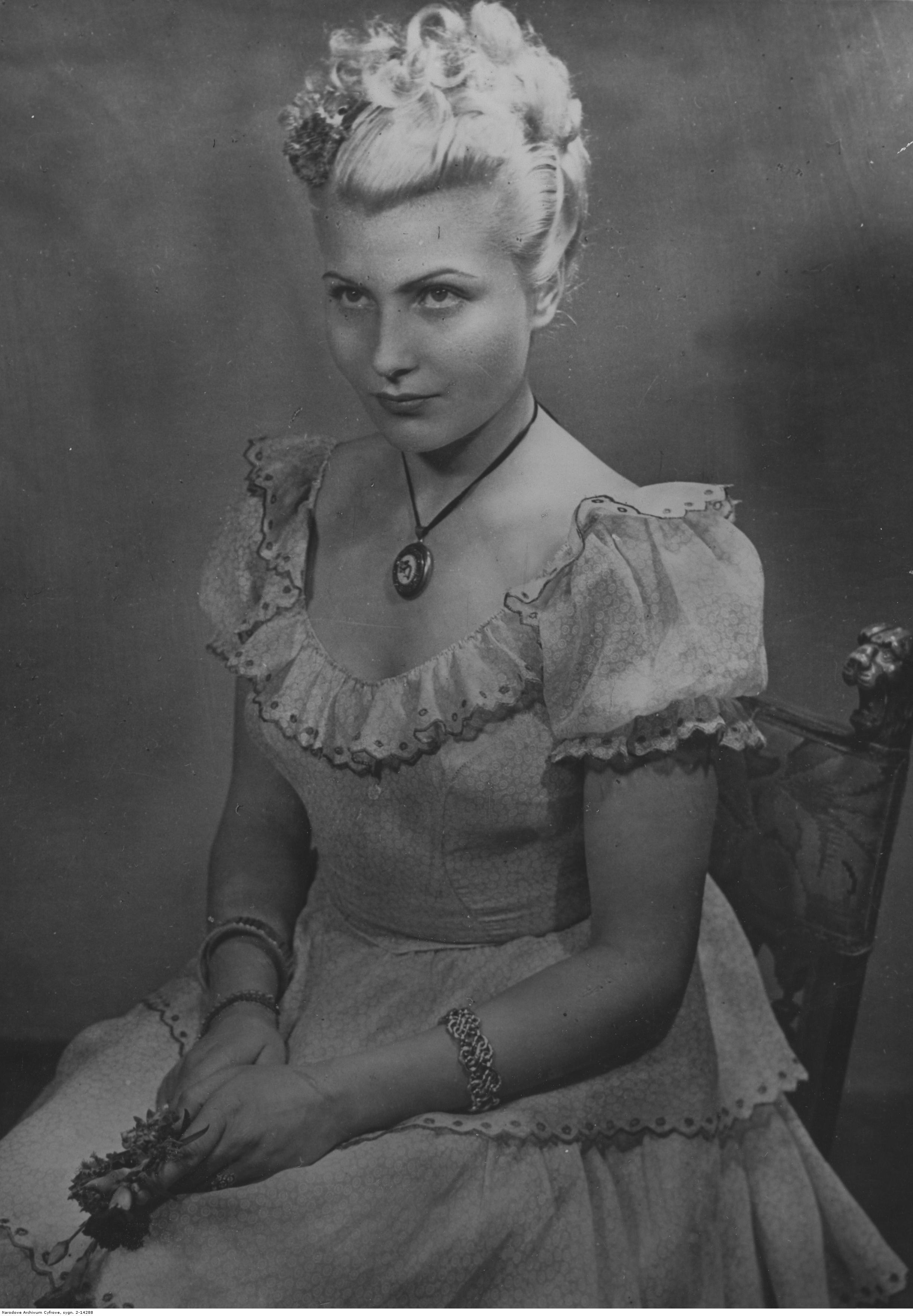
- Born: 16 May 1921; Prague; Czechoslovakia
- Died: 8 March 2002 (aged 80); Munich; Germany
- Occupation: Film actress
- Years active: 1939 - 2001

Winnie Markus (1921–2002) was a Czechoslovakia-born German film and television actress.

== Biography ==
Winnie Markus was born in Czechoslovakia in 1921. She moved to Vienna from Prague and trained in the Max Reinhardt Seminar.

Markus began her career with Wien-Film in 1939 during the Nazi period, starring in Mutterliebe, directed by Gustav Ucicky, the illegitimate son of Gustav Klimt. She was considered to embody the Deutsches Fraulein - blonde hair, delicate features, and an air of innocence rather than overt sex appeal.

== Selected filmography ==
- A Mother's Love (1939) - Rosl Pirlinger
- Brand im Ozean (1939) - Juana de Alvarado
- The Vulture Wally (1940) - Afra Kuttner
- Herz geht vor Anker (1940) - Lotte Kamphausen
- Im Schatten des Berges (1940) - Hedwig Brügger
- The Waitress Anna (1941) - Marina
- Alarmstufe V (1941)
- Brüderlein fein (1942) - Toni Wagner - seine Tochter
- The Sold Grandfather (1942) - Ev Haslinger
- The Little Residence (1942) - Marianne Hartung
- Sommerliebe (1942) - Renate
- Whom the Gods Love (1942) - Konstanze Weber Mozart
- Fahrt ins Abenteuer (1943) - Gusti Lenz
- Tonelli (1943) - Nelly, 'Königin der Luft' Joros Partnerin
- Gefährlicher Frühling (1943) - Renate Willms
- Dir zuliebe (1944) - Maria Mansfeld - seine Frau
- The Enchanted Day (1944) - Christine Schweiger
- Das alte Lied (1945) - Stine
- In Those Days (1947) - Sybille / 1. Geschichte
- Between Yesterday and Tomorrow (1947) - Annette Rodenwald
- Morituri (1948) - Maria Bronek
- The Mozart Story (1948) - Constanza Weber Mozart
- Philine (1949) - Philine Dorn
- I'll Never Forget That Night (1949) - Eva Surén
- Liebesheirat (1949) - Isabell Prax
- The Prisoner (1949) - Cyprienne
- This Man Belongs to Me (1950) - Gretl Fänger
- It Began at Midnight (1951) - die Einbrecherin
- Desire (1951) - Susanne Reval
- Das fremde Leben (1951) - Doris Hallgart
- A Thousand Red Roses Bloom (1952) - Ebba
- Come Back (1953) - Sabine Viborg
- They Call It Love (1953) - Maria West
- Kaiserwalzer (1953) - Luise Pichler - Lehrerin
- Love's Awakening (1953) - Sybill Berg, Pianistin
- The Big Star Parade (1954) - Himself
- Son of St. Moritz (1954) - Lore Engelhofer
- Kaisermanöver (1954) - Comtesse Valerie von Trattenbach
- Roman eines Frauenarztes (1954) - Beate
- Du mein stilles Tal (1955) - Elisabeth von Breithagen
- Devil in Silk (1956) - Sabine Uhl
- Crown Prince Rudolph's Last Love (1956) - Gräfin Larisch
- Liebe, die den Kopf verliert (1956) - Henriette Hergesheim
- Vergiß wenn Du kannst (1956) - Brigitte Sudeny
- Das Mädchen Marion (1956) - Vera von Hoff
- Nichts als Ärger mit der Liebe (1956)
- Made in Germany (1957) - Elise Abbe, geborene Snell
- Doctor Bertram (1957) - Martina Eichstätter
- Man ist nur zweimal jung (1958) - Marthe
- Hoch klingt der Radetzkymarsch (1958) - Lina Strobl, Sängerin am Theater an der Wien
- The Priest and the Girl (1958) - Herta
- What a Woman Dreams of in Springtime (1959) - Elisabeth Brandt
- Melodie und Rhythmus (1959) - Himself (uncredited)
- Ein Herz braucht Liebe (1960)
- Diana - Leidenschaft und Abenteuer (1973)
