= Paths in Twilight =

1948 film directed by Gustav Fröhlich

- Directed by: Gustav Fröhlich
- Written by: Robert A. Stemmle
- Produced by: Rolf Meyer
- Starring: Gustav Fröhlich; Sonja Ziemann; Benno Sterzenbach
- Cinematography: Franz Weihmayr
- Edited by: Walter Fredersdorf
- Music by: Werner Eisbrenner
- Production company: Junge Film-Union Rolf Meyer
- Distributed by: Schorcht Filmverleih
- Release date: 9 April 1948
- Running time: 90 minutes
- Country: West Germany
- Language: German

Paths in Twilight (German: Wege im Zwielicht) is a 1948 West German drama film directed by and starring Gustav Fröhlich. It also features Sonja Ziemann and Benno Sterzenbach. It is part of the rubble film tradition made in Germany in the wake of the Second World War.

It was shot at the Bendestorf Studios outside Hamburg and on location in Hannover. The film's sets were designed by the art director Erich Grave.

== Synopsis ==
The film portrays the lives of three youths in immediate post-war Hannover who are homeless and try to make a living on the black market. When they are falsely connected with a murder they flee the city to the countryside where a sympathetic mayor offers them a fresh start.

== Cast ==
- Gustav Fröhlich as Otto Lukas
- Johanna Lepski as Edith Siems
- Sonja Ziemann as Lissy Stenzel
- Benno Sterzenbach as Stefan Kolb
- Gerd E. Schäfer as Peter Wille
- Alfred Laufhütte as Sepp Lauterjung
- Axel Scholtz as Erwin Putzke
- Hubert Endlein
- Peter A. Horn
- Hanns Lothar
- Wolfgang Völz as Junger Ganove

== Bibliography ==
- Bock, Hans-Michael & Bergfelder, Tim. The Concise Cinegraph: Encyclopaedia of German Cinema. Berghahn Books, 2009.
