= A Night in May =

1938 film

- German DVD Cover
- German: Eine Nacht im Mai
- Directed by: Georg Jacoby
- Written by: Willy Clever
- Produced by: Eberhard Schmidt
- Starring: Marika Rökk; Viktor Staal; Karl Schönböck
- Cinematography: Robert Baberske
- Edited by: Walter Fredersdorf
- Music by: Peter Kreuder; Friedrich Schröder
- Production company: UFA
- Distributed by: UFA
- Release date: 14 September 1938
- Running time: 88 minutes
- Country: Germany
- Language: German

A Night in May (German: Eine Nacht im Mai) is a 1938 German comedy film directed by Georg Jacoby and starring Marika Rökk, Viktor Staal, and Karl Schönböck.

It was made by UFA the leading German company at the Babelsberg Studios in Berlin. The film's sets were designed by the art directors Erich Grave and Max Mellin. Some location filming took place around Wannsee.

== Cast ==
- Marika Rökk as Inge Fleming
- Viktor Staal as Willy Prinz
- Karl Schönböck as Waldemar Becker
- Gisela Schlüter as Alma
- Oskar Sima as Direktor Fleming Jr.
- Albert Florath as Direktor Fleming Sr.
- Ingeborg von Kusserow as Friedl
- Mady Rahl as Mimi
- Franz Arzdorf as Berghoff
- Ursula Herking as Johanna
- Ludwig Schmitz as Schupo Emil

== Bibliography ==
- Bock, Hans-Michael; Bergfelder, Tim, eds. (2009). The Concise Cinegraph: Encyclopaedia of German Cinema. New York: Berghahn Books. ISBN 978-1-57181-655-9.
