= Operation Sleeping Bag =

1955 film directed by Arthur Maria Rabenalt

- German film poster
- German: Unternehmen Schlafsack
- Directed by: Arthur Maria Rabenalt
- Written by: Kurt E. Walter
- Produced by: Walter Koppel; Gyula Trebitsch
- Starring: Eva Ingeborg Scholz; Paul Klinger; Karlheinz Böhm
- Cinematography: Albert Benitz
- Edited by: Margot von Schlieffen
- Music by: Bert Grund
- Production company: Real Film
- Distributed by: J. Arthur Rank Film
- Release date: 23 September 1955
- Running time: 95 minutes
- Country: West Germany
- Language: German

Operation Sleeping Bag (German: Unternehmen Schlafsack) is a 1955 West German comedy war film directed by Arthur Maria Rabenalt and starring Eva Ingeborg Scholz, Paul Klinger and Karlheinz Böhm. It was shot at the Wandsbek Studios in Hamburg. The film's sets were designed by the art directors Albrecht Becker and Herbert Kirchhoff. It was distributed by the German branch of the Rank Organisation.

== Plot ==
During the closing stages of the Second World War, a bureaucratic mistake leads to a German officer being reassigned from the dangerous Eastern Front to Berlin and a new non-existent unit.

== Cast ==
- Eva Ingeborg Scholz as Käthe Forbach
- Paul Klinger as Captain Brack
- Karlheinz Böhm as artillerist Gravenhorst
- Kurt Meisel as first lieutenant Taut
- Renate Mannhardt as Renate Kern
- Bum Krüger as Oberwachtmeister Kern
- Gisela Tantau as young Tänzerin Nica
- Oskar Sima as Oberstleutnant Quent
- Dorothea Wieck as Frau Gravenhorst
- Ursula Herking as Ulla
- Beppo Brem as Unteroffizier Weidlinger
- Charles Regnier as Oberfeldrichter Dr. Kratz
- Ernst Waldow as lieutenant colonel König
- Kai Fischer as Sylvia, the actress
- Willi Rose as Klawitter, the doorman
- Josef Dahmen as Major Fercher
- Jupp Hussels as Captain
- Franz Muxeneder as lance corporal Hallgruber
- Reinhold Nietschmann as Herr Prill
- Wolfgang Neuss as Captain Z.
- Horst Breitenfeld as lance corporal Borngräber
- Willy Millowitsch as sergeant Wiechert
- Götz von Langheim as first lieutenant Randolph
- Walter Klam as Captain Becker
- Adeline Wagner as Eva
- Helmut Peine as 1st officer in the OKH
- Carl Voscherau as 2nd officer in the OKH
- Rudolf Fenner as 3rd officer in the OKH
- Benno Sterzenbach as officer of the SS
- Lotte Klein as Frau Körber
- Aranka Jaenke as young woman
- Kurt Fuß as hotel doorman
- Karl-Heinz Kreienbaum as lance corporal X
- Karl Fleischer as lance corporal Y
- Albert Florath as caretaker at the Music Academy
- Friedrich Schütter as first lieutenant B
