= The Great Mandarin =

1949 film

- Directed by: Karl-Heinz Stroux
- Written by: Karl-Heinz Stroux
- Produced by: Georg Fiebiger
- Starring: Paul Wegener; Carsta Löck; Käthe Haack
- Cinematography: Werner Krien
- Edited by: Erwin Niecke
- Music by: Hans-Otto Borgmann
- Production company: Nova-Filmproduktion
- Distributed by: Bavaria Film
- Release date: 18 February 1949
- Running time: 105 minutes
- Country: West Germany
- Language: German

The Great Mandarin (German: Der große Mandarin) is a 1949 West German comedy drama film directed by Karl-Heinz Stroux and starring Paul Wegener, Carsta Löck, and Käthe Haack.

== Cast ==
- Paul Wegener as Mandarin
- Carsta Löck as Schreiberin
- Käthe Haack as Mutter
- Christiane Felsmann as Tochter
- Hubert von Meyerinck as Chinesischer Staatsbeamter
- Rudolf Reiff
- Friedrich Siemers
- Clemens Hasse
- Karl Hellmer
- Hans Stiebner
- Herbert Weissbach
- Karl Hannemann
- Gustav Püttjer
- Annemarie Hase
- Steffie Spira
- Margarete Schön
- Michael Günther
- Erich Dunskus
- Franz Weber

== Bibliography ==
- Bock, Hans-Michael; Bergfelder, Tim, eds. (2009). The Concise Cinegraph: Encyclopaedia of German Cinema. New York: Berghahn Books. ISBN 978-1-57181-655-9.
