= Nora (1944 film) =

1944 film

- Directed by: Harald Braun
- Written by: Henrik Ibsen (play); Jacob Geis; Harald Braun
- Produced by: Fritz Thiery
- Starring: Luise Ullrich; Viktor Staal; Franziska Kinz
- Cinematography: Franz Weihmayr
- Edited by: Walter Wischniewsky
- Music by: Mark Lothar
- Production company: UFA
- Distributed by: Deutsche Filmvertriebs
- Release date: 14 February 1944
- Running time: 101 minutes
- Country: Germany
- Language: German

Nora is a 1944 German drama film directed by Harald Braun and starring Luise Ullrich, Viktor Staal and Franziska Kinz. The film is an adaptation of Henrik Ibsen's 1879 play A Doll's House. The film uses Ibsen's alternate ending where the unhappy couple are reconciled at the end, and is updated to the 1890s. Location shooting took place around Park Glienicke in Berlin and along the North Sea coast, particularly around Husum. The sets were designed by art directors Emil Hasler and Walter Kutz.

== Cast ==
- Luise Ullrich as Nora Helmer
- Viktor Staal as Dr. Robert Helmer
- Franziska Kinz as Helene Helmer
- Gustav Diessl as Dr. Rank
- Carl Kuhlmann as John Brack
- Ursula Herking as Alvine Tönnesen
- Eberhard Leithoff as Fritz Tönnesen
- Albert Florath as Diener im Elternhause Noras
- Karl Günther as Landrat von Schwartze
- Ernst Waldow as Bürgermeister Krüger
- Sonja Kuska as Frau Krüger
- Erwin Biegel as Sanitätsrat Roselius
- Bruno Hübner as Labsaal, Faktotum bei Brack
- Maria Litto as Fanny, Dienstmädchen
- Karl Hellmer as Kruse, Bankdiener
- Clemens Hasse as Sekretär Dr. Helmers
- Georg H. Schnell as Bankpräsident
- Fanny Cotta as Frau von Schwartze
- Irene Fischer
- Walter Pentzlin
- Harald Sawade
- Georg Thomalla

== Bibliography ==
- Hull, David Stewart. Film in the Third Reich: A Study of the German Cinema, 1933–1945. University of California Press, 1969.
