= What Now, Sibylle? =

1938 film

- Directed by: Peter Paul Brauer
- Written by: Heinz Bierkowski; Wolf Neumeister
- Based on: What Now, Sibylle? by Sofie Schieker-Ebe
- Produced by: Peter Paul Brauer
- Starring: Jutta Freybe; Inge Landgut; Ingeborg von Kusserow
- Cinematography: Robert Baberske
- Edited by: Fritz Stapenhorst
- Music by: Hans Ebert
- Production company: UFA
- Distributed by: UFA
- Release date: 21 July 1938
- Running time: 86 minutes
- Country: Germany
- Language: German

What Now, Sibylle? (German: Was tun, Sybille?) is a 1938 German comedy film directed by Peter Paul Brauer and starring Jutta Freybe, Inge Landgut and Ingeborg von Kusserow. It was based on a novella of the same title by Sofie Schieker-Ebe. It was shot at the Tempelhof Studios in Berlin. The film's sets were designed by the art directors Hermann Asmus and Max Mellin.

== Cast ==
- Jutta Freybe as Sibylle - Primanerin
- Christine Grabe as Primanerin
- Charlotte Schellhorn as Primanerin
- Lotte Hamann as Primanerin
- Ingeborg von Kusserow as Primanerin
- Inge Landgut as Primanerin
- Hanna Mohs as Primanerin
- Hermann Braun as Primaner
- Heinz Sedlak as Primaner Hörrig
- Hans Leibelt as Professor Fromann
- Hans Otto Gauglitz as Werner Fröhlich
- Herbert Hübner as Professor Strobl
- Maria Koppenhöfer as Frau Seiff
- Margarete Kupfer as Frau Findeisen
- Ingolf Kuntze as Dr. Hentschke
- Paul Otto as Direktor
- Ernst Leudesdorff as Landgerichtsdirektor Brant
- Franz Pfaudler as Vater Fröhlich
- Wolf Neumeister as Pedell Schädel
- Maria Krahn as Lehrerin
- Else Reval as Würstchenverkäuferin
- Hermann Pfeiffer as Platzanweiser
- Toni Tetzlaff as Kundin Hahn
- Dorothea Thiess as Frau Schädel
- Adolf Fischer as Mann an der Eisbahn
- Lili Schoenborn-Anspach as Mutter Fröhlich

== Bibliography ==
- Berg, Anne. On Screen and Off: Cinema and the Making of Nazi Hamburg. University of Pennsylvania Press, 2022.
- Bock, Hans-Michael & Töteberg, Michael . Das Ufa-Buch. Zweitausendeins, 1992.
- Waldman, Harry. Nazi Films in America, 1933-1942. McFarland, 2008.
