= Ingeborg von Kusserow =

German actress (1919–2014)

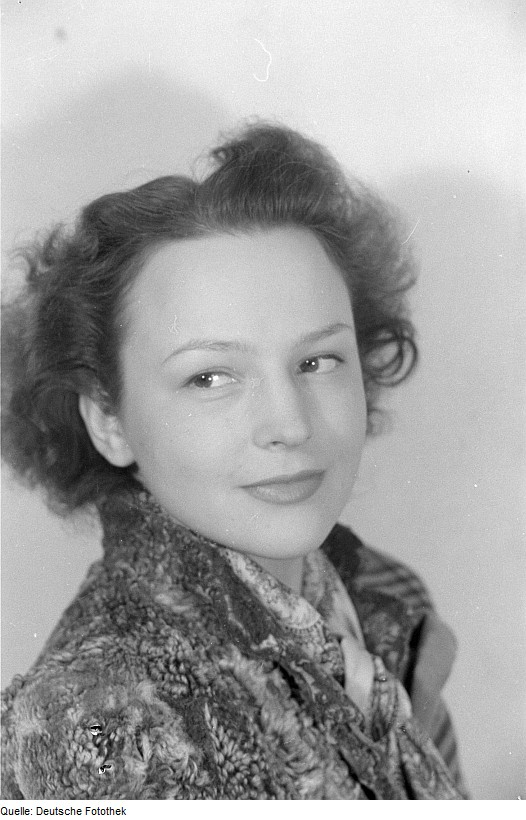
- Ingeborg von Kusserow in 1946
- Born: 28 January 1919; Wollstein, Province of Posen Germany
- Died: 14 April 2014 (aged 95); Hove, England, United Kingdom
- Other name: Ingeborg Wells
- Occupation: Actress

Ingeborg von Kusserow (28 January 1919 – 14 April 2014) was a German film actress.

== Biography ==
Kusserow was born in Wollstein, Province of Posen, Germany (today Wolsztyn, Poland).

She starred in Nazi propaganda films during the Third Reich, which she wrote about in a 1949 memoir I Was Hitler's Mickey Mouse.

Kusserow married Percy Graf Welsburg in November 1941; they hoped to get away to Switzerland and Italy but had to remain in Berlin throughout the war, which she describes in a 1948 memoir Enough, no More. They finally emigrated to Britain in 1947 and lived in St John's Wood in London. She restarted her acting career, usually appearing as Ingeborg Wells. Kusserow retired in 1960 and divorced Welsburg, but married again in 1968 to Kenneth Slingsby-Fahn (1913–2007), a retired RAF officer. Their life together in their garden flat in Abercorn Place has been recounted in a memoir by a neighbour.

In 1979 she and her husband relocated to a cottage in Houghton, West Sussex where Kenneth died in 2007. Kusserow lived alone until 2013, when she suffered a fall and had to live in a care home until her death a year later.

She is known for her appearance in the 1951 film Captain Horatio Hornblower and in the German adaptation of the play You Know I Can't Hear You When the Water's Running. She played Lady Irina in episode 21 "The Vandals" in The Adventures of Robin Hood (1956).

Kusserow died on 14 April 2014. Before her death she reportedly fell and broke a femur. She survived but as a result of the injury her health declined severely.

== Selected filmography ==
- Three Soldiers in the Kaiserjäger (1933)
- The Court Concert (1936) - Zofe Babette
- When Women Keep Silent (1937) - Jenny - Zofe bei Wörners
- Love Can Lie (1937) - Britta Torsten
- Daphne and the Diplomat (1937) - Matz
- My Friend Barbara (1937) - Lucie
- Mystery About Beate (1938) - Schauspielerin, 1.Etage
- Wie einst im Mai (1938)
- Kleiner Mann ganz groß (1938) - Nina Würbel, Plakatmalerin
- The Girl of Last Night (1938) - Evelyn Barrow - Tochter
- What Now, Sibylle? (1938) - Primanerin
- A Night in May (1938) - Friedl
- Drei Unteroffiziere (1938) - Lisbeth, Telefonistin
- Renate in the Quartet (1939) - Li, Frau Ambergs Nichte
- In letzter Minute (1939) - Maria
- Herz ohne Heimat (1940) - Baby
- Der dunkle Punkt (1940)
- Counterfeiters (1940) - Else Bornemann
- Leichte Muse (1941) - Tochter Jette Müller
- Alles aus Liebe (1943) - Zoobesucherin (uncredited)
- Das Konzert (1944) - Delfine
- Tell the Truth (1946) - Maria - seine Braut
- Der große Fall (1949) - Eine reizende Chansonsängerin
- Golden Arrow (1949) - 1st Nightclub hostess
- Captain Horatio Hornblower (1951) - Hebe (Lady Barbara's Maid)
- One Wild Oat (1951) - Gloria Samson
- Chelsea Story (1951) - Janice
- Two on the Tiles (1951) - Madeleine
- Death Is a Number (1951) - Gipsy Girl
- Secret People (1952) - Shoe Shop Girl
- King of the Underworld (1952) - Marie
- Women of Twilight (1952) - Lili, the German Boarder
- House of Blackmail (1953) - Emma
- Double Exposure (1954) - Maxine Golder
- Child's Play (1954) - Lea Blotz
- Port of Escape (1956) - Lucy
- Across the Bridge (1957) - Mrs. Scarff
