= Max the Pickpocket =

1962 film

- Elfie Pertramer and Heinz Rühmann
- Directed by: Imo Moszkowicz
- Written by: István Békeffy; Hans Jacoby
- Produced by: Claus Hardt; Utz Utermann
- Starring: Heinz Rühmann; Elfie Pertramer; Hans Clarin
- Cinematography: Albert Benitz
- Edited by: Walter Boos
- Music by: Martin Böttcher
- Production company: Bavaria Film
- Distributed by: Bavaria Film
- Release date: 1 March 1962
- Running time: 91 minutes
- Country: West Germany
- Language: German

Max the Pickpocket (German: Max, der Taschendieb) is a 1962 West German comedy crime film directed by Imo Moszkowicz and starring Heinz Rühmann, Elfie Pertramer and Hans Clarin.

It was made at the Bavaria Studios in Munich.

== Synopsis ==
A small-time pickpocket investigates when his brother-in-law is murdered.

== Cast ==
- Heinz Rühmann as Max Schilling
- Elfie Pertramer as Pauline Schilling
- Hans Clarin as Fred
- Ruth Stephan as Desiree
- Hans Hessling as Arthur
- Lotte Ledl as Lizzy
- Benno Sterzenbach as Charly Gibbons
- Harald Maresch as Joe
- Frithjof Vierock as Egon Schilling
- Hans Leibelt
- Ulrich Beiger as Alleinunterhalter
- Hans Jürgen Diedrich
- Helga Anders as Brigitte
- Gernot Duda
- Arno Assmann as Polizeiinspektor Friedrich

== Bibliography ==
- Bock, Hans-Michael & Bergfelder, Tim. The Concise CineGraph. Encyclopedia of German Cinema. Berghahn Books, 2009.
