= Love Can Lie =

1937 film

- Directed by: Heinz Helbig
- Written by: Fred Andreas (novel); Erich Ebermayer; Franz Wallner-Basté
- Produced by: Heinz-Joachim Ewert
- Starring: Karl Ludwig Diehl; Dorothea Wieck; Jutta Freybe
- Cinematography: Willy Gerlach; Herbert Körner
- Music by: Ernst Erich Buder
- Production company: Deka Film
- Distributed by: Tobis Film
- Release date: 3 August 1937
- Country: Germany
- Language: German

Love Can Lie (German: Liebe kann lügen) is a 1937 German romance film directed by Heinz Helbig and starring Karl Ludwig Diehl, Dorothea Wieck and Jutta Freybe.

It was released by Tobis Film. The film's sets were designed by Erich Zander.

== Cast ==
- Karl Ludwig Diehl as Ivar Andersson
- Dorothea Wieck as Sigrid Mallé
- Jutta Freybe as Kerstin Dahlberg
- Kurt Meisel as August Halfgreen
- Ingeborg von Kusserow as Britta Torsten
- Josefine Dora as Tante Betty
- Wilmo Schäfer as Emil
- Jeanette Bethge
- Marina von Ditmar
- Inga Ewald
- Erika Raphael
- Margo Kochan
- Gerhard Dammann
- Erich Dunskus
- Kurt Iller
- Curd Jürgens as Student Holger Engström
- Heinz Piper
- Otto Sauter-Sarto
- Inge Landgut
- Franz Arzdorf
- Margarete Faas
- Alfred Heynisch
- Berta Heynisch
- Antonie Jaeckel
- Kurt Keller-Nebri
- Karl Platen
- Irmingard Schreiter
- Toni Tetzlaff
- Hella Thornegg
- Helene Westphal
- Emmy Wyda

== Bibliography ==
- Heins, Laura (2013). Nazi Film Melodrama. University of Illinois Press. ISBN 978-0-252-09502-3.
