= Maya of the Seven Veils =

1951 film

- Directed by: Géza von Cziffra
- Written by: Géza von Cziffra
- Produced by: Fritz Kirchhoff
- Starring: Maria Litto; Willy Fritsch; Rudolf Platte
- Cinematography: Georg Bruckbauer
- Edited by: Alice Ludwig
- Music by: Michael Jary
- Production company: Pontus Film
- Distributed by: Deutsche Cosmopol Film
- Release date: 31 August 1951
- Running time: 96 minutes
- Country: West Germany
- Language: German

Maya of the Seven Veils or The Veiled Lady (German: Die verschleierte Maja) is a 1951 West German musical film directed by Géza von Cziffra and starring Maria Litto, Willy Fritsch and Rudolf Platte.

It was shot at the Wandsbek Studios in Hamburg. The film's sets were designed by the art director Herbert Kirchhoff.

== Partial cast ==
- Maria Litto as Maja Club's dancing star
- Willy Fritsch
- Rudolf Platte
- Grethe Weiser
- Käthe Haack
- Rudolf Vogel
- Oskar Sima
- Ernst Waldow
- Iska Geri as Singer
- Jockel Stahl as Dancer
- Anneliese Rothenberger as Singer
- Peter Schütte as Singer
- Evelyn Künneke as Singer
- Gerhard Wendland as Singer
- Joachim Wolff as Singer
- Margarete Slezak as Eine Dame mit Schmuck

== Bibliography ==
- Bock, Hans-Michael; Bergfelder, Tim, eds. (2009). The Concise Cinegraph: Encyclopaedia of German Cinema. New York: Berghahn Books. ISBN 978-1-57181-655-9.
