= Life Begins at Seventeen =

1953 film

- Directed by: Paul Martin
- Written by: Gerda Corbett; Paul Martin; Gábor Vaszary (novel)
- Produced by: Walter Koppel
- Starring: Sonja Ziemann; Paul Hubschmid; Paul Hörbiger
- Cinematography: Albert Benitz
- Edited by: Martha Dübber
- Music by: Wolfgang Zeller
- Production company: Apollo-Film
- Distributed by: Deutsche London-Film
- Release date: 12 November 1953
- Running time: 90 minutes
- Country: West Germany
- Language: German

Life Begins at Seventeen (German: Mit siebzehn beginnt das Leben) is a 1953 West German romance film directed by Paul Martin and starring Sonja Ziemann, Paul Hubschmid and Paul Hörbiger. It was shot at the Tempelhof Studios in West Berlin. The film's sets were designed by the art director Wilhelm Vorwerg.

== Cast ==
- Sonja Ziemann as Madeleine Desughes
- Anne-Marie Blanc as Aline Deshuges
- Paul Hubschmid as Raymond Montandon, Kunstmaler
- Paul Hartmann as Professor Lenoire
- Loni Heuser as Clarisse Peronne
- Paul Hörbiger as Jacques Peronne
- Margarete Haagen as Adelheid
- Heinrich Gretler as Pfarrer
- Marina Ried as Sylvia
- Hilde Körber as Lehrerin
- Stanislav Ledinek as Küster
- Ruth Fischer as Pariser Freundin
- Heinz Lausch as Henry

== Bibliography ==
- Hans-Michael Bock and Tim Bergfelder. The Concise Cinegraph: An Encyclopedia of German Cinema. Berghahn Books, 2009.
