= The Big Star Parade =

1954 film

- German film poster
- German: Die große Starparade
- Directed by: Paul Martin
- Written by: Ernst Neubach; Franz Tanzler
- Produced by: Artur Brauner; Léon Canel
- Starring: Adrian Hoven; Renate Holm; Gunther Philipp
- Cinematography: Albert Benitz
- Edited by: Martha Dübber
- Music by: Michael Jary
- Production company: CCC Film
- Distributed by: Gloria Film
- Release date: 3 September 1954
- Running time: 98 minutes
- Country: West Germany
- Language: German

The Big Star Parade (German: Die große Starparade) is a 1954 West German musical comedy film directed by Paul Martin and starring Adrian Hoven, Renate Holm and Gunther Philipp.

The film's sets were designed by the art director Hans Jürgen Kiebach and Gabriel Pellon. It was shot at the Spandau Studios and on location in Bavaria and Hamburg.

== Cast ==
- Adrian Hoven as Peter Hofer
- Renate Holm as Renate Winkelmann
- Gunther Philipp as Hannes Schöpf
- Bully Buhlan as himself
- Peter W. Staub as Paul Grüter
- Hans Olden as Lukas Pichler
- Elfie Pertramer as Kathi Gschwandtner
- Fritz Imhoff as Max Winkelmann
- Aribert Wäscher as director of broadcasting
- Mimi Stelzer as Bäuerin Gschwandtner
- Ilja Glusgal as himself
- Jo Herbst as Neppke
- Michael Jary as himself
- Katherine Dunham as herself
- Peter Alexander as himself
- Nocha Doina as herself
- Kurt Edelhagen as himself
- Cornelia Froboess as herself
- Peter Hinnen as himself
- Will Höhne as himself
- Macky Kaspar as himself
- Rolf Kühn as himself
- Evelyn Künneke as herself
- Liselotte Malkowsky as herself
- Sunny Lang as himself
- Hazy Osterwald as themselves
- Die Drei Peheiros as themselves
- Die Ping Pong's as themselves
- Das Raisner Trio as themselves
- Dorle Rath as herself
- Geschwister Schmid as themselves
- Fritz Schulz-Reichel as himself
- Sunshine Quartett as themselves
- Caterina Valente as herself
- Albert Vossen as himself
- Horst Winter as himself
- Sonja Ziemann as Sonja Ziemann
- Rudolf Prack as himself
- Winnie Markus as herself
- Hannelore Bollmann as herself

== Bibliography ==
- Hannah Durkin. Josephine Baker and Katherine Dunham: Dances in Literature and Cinema. University of Illinois Press, 2019.
