= Kolberg (film) =

1945 Nazi propaganda film

- Theatrical release poster
- Directed by: Veit Harlan
- Written by: Veit Harlan; Alfred Braun; Joseph Goebbels (uncredited)
- Based on: Kolberg by Paul Heyse (uncredited)
- Produced by: Veit Harlan; Joseph Goebbels (uncredited)
- Starring: Kristina Söderbaum; Heinrich George; Paul Wegener; Horst Caspar; Gustav Diessl; Otto Wernicke; Kurt Meisel
- Cinematography: Bruno Mondi
- Edited by: Wolfgang Schleif
- Music by: Norbert Schultze
- Production company: Ufa Filmkunst GmbH (Herstellungsgruppe Veit Harlan)
- Distributed by: Deutsche Filmvertriebs GmbH
- Release date: 30 January 1945
- Running time: 110 minutes
- Country: Nazi Germany
- Languages: German; French
- Budget: 7.6 million ℛ︁ℳ︁

Kolberg is a 1945 Nazi propaganda historical film written and directed by Veit Harlan. One of the last films of the Third Reich, it was intended to bolster the will of the German population to resist the Allies.

Harlan and Alfred Braun, who also worked on the screenplay, based the film on the autobiography of Joachim Nettelbeck, mayor of Kolberg in Pomerania, and on Paul Heyse's later play adapted from the book. Joseph Goebbels participated in writing the screenplay but was not credited. He insisted that a romantic interest be added; this is the figure of Maria.

The film recounts the defence of the besieged fortress town of Kolberg against French troops between April and July 1807, during the Napoleonic Wars. In fact, the city's defence, led by then-Lieutenant Colonel August von Gneisenau, held out until the war was ended by the Treaty of Tilsit, but the film portrays the French abandoning the siege.

== Plot ==
The film begins in 1813 after the phase of the Napoleonic Wars known in German as the Befreiungskriege (Wars of Liberation). The opening scenes show Prussian Landwehr and volunteers marching in the streets of Breslau through enthusiastic crowds. King Frederick William III of Prussia and Count August von Gneisenau discuss recent events, with Gneisenau saying that the successful defence of Kolberg under siege taught the importance of citizen armies.

After an admonition that kings who cannot lead must abdicate, the scene switches to Vienna in 1806. It shows the abdication of the last Holy Roman Emperor, Francis II of Austria. In the film, the character Gneisenau describes him as "an Emperor who abandoned the German people in their hour of need".

The film moves to Kolberg in 1806, where inhabitants are shown enjoying ordinary life. The town's leaders, Mayor Nettelbeck chief among them, discuss Napoleon's announcements and what it will mean to them. Some see the French victories as a good thing; some wonder whether to leave. Nettelbeck alone is set on resisting the French.

Nettelbeck struggles to defend his city against others' cowardice and lethargy, and the old-fashioned ideas of the garrison commander. Nettelbeck creates a citizen militia although opposed by the regular Prussian Army. He has supplies collected and strongly opposes any idea of surrender to the French.

Finally, having been threatened with execution by the military, and convinced that Kolberg can be saved only if a great leader can be found, Nettelbeck sends Maria, a farmer's innocent daughter on the dangerous journey to Königsberg, whither the Court of Prussia has retreated. She is to meet with the King and with Queen Louise. Napoleon had described the Queen as "the only man in Prussia". Maria meets with the Queen alone and persuades her to order Gneisenau to Kolberg.

Gneisenau confronts Nettelbeck and emerges as the top leader – in accordance with the Führerprinzip that there had to be one leader – but the two work together with the army and the citizens to save the city from the French. After Kolberg is saved when the French retreat (this is not historically true), the film returns to 1813 after the Convention of Tauroggen. Napoleon had been defeated in Russia, and Prussian leaders wonder whether it is time to confront him. Gneisenau convinces Frederick William to do so; he writes the proclamation An Mein Volk ("To my People") announcing the Wars of Liberation.

== Cast ==
- Kristina Söderbaum as Maria, a farmer's daughter who gains audience with the Queen
- Heinrich George as Joachim Nettelbeck
- Paul Wegener as General Ludwig Moritz von Loucadou
- Horst Caspar as August Neidhardt von Gneisenau
- Gustav Diessl as Ferdinand von Schill
- Otto Wernicke as Farmer Werner
- Kurt Meisel as Claus
- Claus Clausen as Frederick William III of Prussia
- Irene von Meyendorff as Louise of Mecklenburg-Strelitz
- Greta Schröder as Sophie Marie von Voß
- Franz Herterich as Emperor Francis II
- Jakob Tiedtke as Shipowner
- Paul Bildt as Rector
- Charles Schauten as Napoleon
- Theo Shall as Louis Henri Loison
- Werner Scharf as Pietro Teulié
- Jaspar von Oertzen as Prince Louis Ferdinand of Prussia, a role edited out.

== Production ==
Joseph Goebbels began planning for Kolberg in 1941, and the film entered production in 1943. He hired Veit Harlan, the director of Jud Süß, to make the film on 1 June 1943. It was made in Agfacolor and cost 7.6 million ℛ︁ℳ︁, not 8.5 million ℛ︁ℳ︁ as is often stated.

Principal cinematography took place from 22 October 1943 to August 1944. The exteriors were shot in and around the cities of Kolberg, Königsberg, Treptow, Berlin, Seeburg, and Neustettin. Harlan said that the "law of madness" applied during the film's production, and that Adolf Hitler and Goebbels believed the film "could be more useful to them than even a military miracle, because they no longer believed in victory in any rational way". Goebbels worked on the film as an uncredited screenwriter.

Kristina Söderbaum, the director's wife, was cast as Maria, a farmer's daughter and one of the lead roles in the film.

Harlan claimed that 10,000 uniforms were made for the film, and that 6,000 horses and 187,000 soldiers were used for it. Harlan stated that he was given 4,000 sailors for a scene of a French attack across flooded fields after appealing the Kriegsmarine's rejection of his demand. The film's extras amounted to perhaps 5,000 soldiers; hundreds of Kolberg people participated for a daily fee of 5 ℛ︁ℳ︁. The number of extras is commonly exaggerated at 187,000, and claims of entire divisions of troops taking part are completely false.

Goebbels sent a memorandum from script supervisor Hans Hinkel requesting changes on 6 December 1944. These demands included the cutting of "all the mass battle and street scenes" in favor of "scenes featuring the familiar characters", a scene of a woman giving birth, and "the hysterical outburst of the brother Klaus". One-fourth of the film's budget was spent on scenes cut by Goebbels. 100 railroad cars were used to transport salt to be used as snow in the film.

The Battle of Leipzig was meant to be included in order to make up for the German defeat at Kolberg. Scenes depicting this battle were filmed, but it was not included in the final version.

== Release ==
The film was approved by the censors on 26 January 1945, and premiered for German forces in the defense zone in occupied La Rochelle, France on 30 January. The city was liberated by Allied forces two months later.

It opened in a temporary cinema (U.T. Alexanderplatz) and at Tauentzien-Palast in Berlin. It ran under constant threat of air raids until the fall of Berlin to Soviet forces in May 1945. Simultaneously with the opening in Berlin, it was airdropped and shown to the crew of the naval base at La Rochelle at the Théâtre de la Ville. It was also screened in the Reich Chancellery after the broadcast of Hitler's last radio address on 30 January. One of the last films of the Third Reich, it never went into general release.

The city of Kolberg was declared a Festung ("fortress town") as Soviet forces neared it on 24 February 1945. Within a month of the film's opening Kolberg was under full siege by the Red Army and the First Polish Army, with around 70,000 trapped German civilians and military personnel. House-to-house fighting caused devastation. Kolberg fell to Soviet and Polish forces on 18 March 1945. Many civilians escaped by sea. The Soviet Union permanently expelled all who survived the siege, along with all Germans in east Pomerania. The ruined city of Kolberg became part of the postwar Polish People's Republic. The city is now known as Kołobrzeg.

After World War II the film was released in Argentina as Burning Hearts and in Switzerland as The Renunciation. It was theatrically released by Atlas Films in West Germany in 1966; it was interspersed with newsreel footage of Nazi leaders.

== See also ==
- List of German films 1933–1945
- Nazism and cinema

== Works cited ==
- Hull, David (1969). Film in the Third Reich: Art and Propaganda in Nazi Germany. Simon & Schuster. SBN 671214861.
- Leiser, Erwin (1974). Nazi Cinema. Macmillan Publishers. ISBN 0025702300.
- Medved, Harry; Medved, Michael (1984). The Hollywood Hall of Shame: The Most Expensive Flops in Movie History. Angus & Robertson. ISBN 0207149291.
- Noack, Frank (2016) [2000]. Veit Harlan: "des Teufels Regisser" [Veit Harlan: The Life and Work of a Nazi Filmmaker]. Lexington: University Press of Kentucky. ISBN 9780813167008.
- Welch, David (1983). Propaganda and the German Cinema: 1933-1945. I.B. Tauris. ISBN 9781860645204.
