= Encounter with Werther =

1949 film

- Directed by: Karl-Heinz Stroux
- Written by: Hermann Gressieker; Karl-Heinz Stroux
- Based on: The Sorrows of Young Werther by Johann Wolfgang von Goethe
- Produced by: Georg Fiebiger
- Starring: Horst Caspar; Heidemarie Hatheyer; Paul Klinger
- Cinematography: Friedl Behn-Grund; Ernst W. Kalinke
- Edited by: Erwin Niecke; Eva Marie Stroux
- Music by: Wolfgang Fortner
- Production company: Nova-Filmproduktion
- Distributed by: Willy Karp-Film
- Release date: 5 August 1949
- Running time: 88 minutes
- Country: West Germany
- Language: German

Encounter with Werther (German: Begegnung mit Werther) is a 1949 West German historical drama film directed by Karl-Heinz Stroux and starring Horst Caspar, Heidemarie Hatheyer and Paul Klinger. It is based on the writing of the 1774 novel The Sorrows of Young Werther by Johann Wolfgang von Goethe. It was released to commemorate the bicentennial of the writer's birthday in August 1949.

It was shot at the Bavaria Studios in Munich and on location in Limburg, Wetzlar and Marburg an der Lahn. The film's sets were designed by the art director Paul Markwitz.

== Cast ==
- Horst Caspar as Werther
- Heidemarie Hatheyer as Lotte
- Paul Klinger as Albert
- Rudolf Reiff as Amtmann as Lotte's Father
- Paul Dahlke as Napoleon
- Walter Kottenkamp as Goethe
- Fritz Odemar as Graf
- Harald Mannl as Gesandter
- Christiane Felsmann as Frl. von Bassenheim
- Arthur Mentz as Bauernbursche
- Friedrich Siemers as Schreiber Heinrich
- Karl Lieffen as Bediensteter Bursche

== Bibliography ==
- Bock, Hans-Michael & Bergfelder, Tim. The Concise Cinegraph: Encyclopaedia of German Cinema. Berghahn Books, 2009.
- Gillespie, Gerald & Engel, Manfred & Dieterle, Bernard. Romantic Prose Fiction. John Benjamins Publishing, 2008.
