= The Beautiful Galatea (film) =

1950 West German film by Rolf Meyer

- German film poster
- German: Die wunderschöne Galathee
- Directed by: Rolf Meyer
- Written by: Kurt E. Walter
- Produced by: Rolf Meyer
- Starring: Hannelore Schroth; Viktor de Kowa; Willy Fritsch
- Cinematography: Igor Oberberg
- Edited by: Martha Dübber
- Music by: Franz Grothe
- Production company: Junge Film-Union Rolf Meyer
- Distributed by: National-Film
- Release date: 13 April 1950
- Running time: 105 minutes
- Country: West Germany
- Language: German

The Beautiful Galatea (German: Die wunderschöne Galathee) is a 1950 West German romantic comedy film directed by Rolf Meyer and starring Hannelore Schroth, Viktor de Kowa and Willy Fritsch. It is inspired by the story of Pygmalion's statue Galatea and is based on the play of the same name by Franz von Suppé.

It was shot at the Bendestorf Studios and the Tempelhof Studios in Berlin. The film's sets were designed by Franz Schroedter.

== Plot ==
During the first 18 years of the 20th century, in a small town, two men, the sculptor Viktor Kolin and the Kapellmeister Marcel Thomas work on the Galathée theme, each in his own way. While one tries to approach the Galathée in a musical way, the other plans to carton the nymph in stone. Viktor has already chosen a young woman to model for the statue: it is the young Leni, a simple girl from the people who works as a temp at the vegetable market.

Leni feels very flattered and promptly falls in love with Viktor, making her a competitor of the singer Victoria Mertens, the sculptor's girlfriend. Viktor on the other hand, also shows interest in Victoria, which gives the erotic round additional piquancy. Upon completing his masterpiece, Marcel suddenly loses interest in Leni, who had hoped that the sculpture would attract him more to her. Full of anger, she goes to his studio and smashes the artwork. A court case is scheduled, and only then does Viktor realizes Leni's true feelings. Following the court order, he no longer opposes Victoria's decision to marry Kapellmeister Thomas.

== Cast ==
- Hannelore Schroth as Leni Fink
- Viktor de Kowa as Viktor Kolin
- Willy Fritsch as Marcel Thomas
- Gisela Schmidting as Victoria Mertens
- Margarete Haagen as Anastasia
- Erna Sellmer
- Hans Schwarz Jr.
- Ernst Waldow
- Edda Seippel
- Franz Schafheitlin
- Werner Stock
- Albert Florath
