= The Sun of St. Moritz (1954 film) =

German film

- Theatrical film poster
- German: Die Sonne von St. Moritz
- Directed by: Arthur Maria Rabenalt
- Written by: Paul Oskar Höcker (novel); Curt J. Braun
- Produced by: Karl Hofer
- Starring: Winnie Markus; Karlheinz Böhm; Signe Hasso
- Cinematography: Ernst W. Kalinke
- Edited by: Friedel Buckow
- Music by: Bert Grund
- Production company: Berna
- Distributed by: Neue Filmverleih
- Release date: 26 March 1954
- Running time: 90 minutes
- Country: West Germany
- Language: German

The Sun of St. Moritz (German: Die Sonne von St. Moritz) is a 1954 West German drama film directed by Arthur Maria Rabenalt and starring Winnie Markus, Karlheinz Böhm and Signe Hasso.

The film's art direction was by Felix Smetana.

== Cast ==
- Winnie Markus as Lore Engelhofer
- Karlheinz Böhm as Dr. Robert Frank
- Signe Hasso as Gerti Selle
- Ingrid Pan as Yvonne Beerli
- Claus Biederstaedt as Paul Genzmer
- Erik Frey as Dr. Mayr
- Heinrich Gretler as Herr Thuregg
- Addi Adametz
- Gertrud Bald
- Arno Ebert
- Harry Halm
- Harry Hardt
- Walter Janssen
- Rudolf Reiff
