= Elisabeth Wendt =

German actress

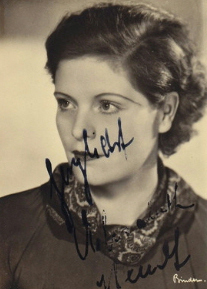
- circa 1928
- Born: 11 January 1906; Cologne, North Rhine-Westphalia, Germany
- Died: 24 March 1980 (aged 74); West Berlin, West Germany
- Occupation: Actress
- Years active: 1931 - 1964

Elisabeth Wendt (11 January 1906 – 24 March 1980) was a German film actress. After making her debut in Georg Wilhelm Pabst's Comradeship (1931), she appeared mostly in supporting roles during the Nazi era and immediate post-Second World War years.

== Partial filmography ==
- Comradeship (1931) - Frau Anna Wittkopp
- Theodor Körner (1932)
- The First Right of the Child (1932)
- Sacred Waters (1932)
- Impossible Love (1932) - Katharina Steinkampp, seine Frau
- Die vom Niederrhein (1933) - Bettina Wittelsbach
- Mother and Child (1934) - Frau Petersen
- Hanneles Himmelfahrt (1934) - Hete
- Stradivárius (1935)
- Ein seltsamer Gast (1936) - Lou
- The Hour of Temptation (1936) - Alice - seine Frau
- The Grey Lady (1937) - Lola
- On Leave but Still on Duty (1938) - Lulu Frey
- Frau Sylvelin (1938) - Fräulein Brunner
- The Stars Shine (1938) - Lisa Marwen
- The Holm Murder Case (1938) - Jenny Nerger, seine Frau
- Men, Animals and Sensations (1938) - Maja de Passy
- The Fourth Is Not Coming (1939) - Frau Elle Fredmark
- The Wedding Trip (1939) - Countess Amelie Zuurmondt
- The Strange Woman (1939) - Jouka
- Schneewittchen und die sieben Zwerge (1939) - Königin
- My Life for Ireland (1941) - Nora Mullins
- The Green Salon (1944) - Lieselotte, seine Frau
- Die Buntkarierten (1949)
- Girls Behind Bars (1949) - Else Richnow, 'Bohnenstange'
- Dr. Semmelweis (1950) - 2. Krankenschwester
- The Staircase (1950) - Frau Görisch
- Ave Maria (1953) - Lisa Nilsson

== Bibliography ==
- Eisner, Lotte. The Haunted Screen: Expressionism in the German Cinema and the Influence of Max Reinhardt. University of California Press, 2008.
