= Ernst Waldow =

German actor

- Born: 22 August 1893; Berlin; German Empire
- Died: 5 June 1964 (aged 70); Hamburg; West Germany
- Occupation: Film actor
- Years active: 1916 - 1963

Ernst Waldow (22 August 1893 – 5 June 1964) was a German film actor. He appeared in more than 160 films during his career.

== Selected filmography ==
- Rübezahl's Wedding (1916)
- Sin of a Beautiful Woman (1929)
- The Green Domino (1935)
- Inkognito (1936)
- Boccaccio (1936)
- The Court Concert (1936)
- When the Cock Crows (1936)
- Game on Board (1936)
- If We All Were Angels (1936)
- The Dreamer (1936)
- The Man Who Was Sherlock Holmes (1937)
- Signal in the Night (1937)
- The Beaver Coat (1937)
- Togger (1937)
- The Divine Jetta (1937)
- When Women Keep Silent (1937)
- Mystery About Beate (1938)
- The Girl of Last Night (1938)
- The Woman at the Crossroads (1938)
- Women for Golden Hill (1938)
- Who's Kissing Madeleine? (1939)
- The Scoundrel (1939)
- Wedding in Barenhof (1942)
- Doctor Crippen (1942)
- Voice of the Heart (1942)
- Circus Renz (1943)
- A Man With Principles? (1943)
- Beloved Darling (1943)
- Wild Bird (1943)
- Mask in Blue (1943)
- The Wedding Hotel (1944)
- The Enchanted Day (1944)
- Nora (1944)
- Somewhere in Berlin (1946)
- Blum Affair (1948)
- Thank You, I'm Fine (1948)
- Second Hand Destiny (1949)
- How Do We Tell Our Children? (1949)
- I'll Never Forget That Night (1949)
- Scandal at the Embassy (1950)
- One Night Apart (1950)
- The Beautiful Galatea (1950)
- The Black Forest Girl (1950)
- Professor Nachtfalter (1951)
- Maya of the Seven Veils (1951)
- The Dubarry (1951)
- The Blue Star of the South (1951)
- The Heath Is Green (1951)
- It Began at Midnight (1951)
- Toxi (1952)
- I Can't Marry Them All (1952)
- The Exchange (1952)
- Roses Bloom on the Moorland (1952)
- A Musical War of Love (1953)
- Hocuspocus (1953)
- The Charming Young Lady (1953)
- Scandal at the Girls' School (1953)
- The Mill in the Black Forest (1953)
- Mask in Blue (1953)
- Josef the Chaste (1953)
- The Empress of China (1953)
- Love and Trumpets (1954)
- Sauerbruch – Das war mein Leben (1954)
- The Telephone Operator (1954)
- Fireworks (1954)
- The Little Czar (1954)
- Emil and the Detectives (1954)
- The Happy Village (1955)
- The Forest House in Tyrol (1955)
- Father's Day (1955)
- Alibi (1955)
- Operation Sleeping Bag (1955)
- Three Days Confined to Barracks (1955)
- My Husband's Getting Married Today (1956)
- A Thousand Melodies (1956)
- Regine (1956)
- Two Bavarians in St. Pauli (1956)
- The Heart of St. Pauli (1957)
- The Schimeck Family (1957)
- The Big Chance (1957)
- Between Munich and St. Pauli (1957)
- The Muzzle (1958)
- The Domestic Tyrant (1959)
- Peter Shoots Down the Bird (1959)
- The Merry War of Captain Pedro (1959)
- The Last Pedestrian (1960)
- Boomerang (1960)
- The Haunted Castle (1960)
- Snow White and the Seven Jugglers (1962)

== Bibliography ==
- Kreimeier, Klaus. The UFA Story: A Story of Germany's Greatest Film Company 1918-1945. University of California Press, 1999.
