= Maria Litto =

Maria Litto (1919–1996) was a German ballet dancer, choreographer and film actress. In 1970, she pioneered dance programming on German television.

== Early life ==
Born in Ovenhausen, Höxter, on 9 September 1919, Litto attended the town's primary and secondary schools. From the age of 16, she received training in ballet at the Tanzschule Carus in Holzminden and, when 18, at the Folkwangschule in Essen. She completed her training at the Wuppertal Municipal Theatre.

== Career ==
She joined the Berlin Opera ballet in 1941, first becoming a solo dancer and then, in 1944, prima ballerina. In 1948, she performed in Werner Egk's ballet Abraxas. Thereafter she danced in various films including Third from the Right, Melody of Fate, Maya of the Seven Veils and, taking the lead role, in Queen of the Arena. In 1953, she starred in the musical Die Blume von Hawaii (The Flower of Hawaii) where she played Princess Lia a fictionalised version of Liliuokalani.

In November 1954, she was contracted by the Hamburg Opera. After performing in Hamlet, in 1955 she starred as the snake in Werner Egk's Irische Legende at the Salzburg Festival. Among her subsequent successes were Der Engel von Montparnasse and Formender Willie. She also performed in the musical Fanny at Hamburg's Thalia Theater.

In the 1960s, she devoted more time to choreography together with her husband Heinz Schmiedel. In 1970 she played the lead in the television series Tournee – Ein Ballett tanzt um die Welt, pioneering dance programming on German television. The couple continued to appear in television productions until her husband's sudden death in December 1978. Completely devastated, she withdrew from further appearances. Maria Litto died in Hamburg on 25 October 1996.

== Film and television ==
From 1942 to 1971, Maria Litto appeared in a considerable number of films and television productions. She was also active as a television choreographer until 1979.

== Selected filmography ==
- The Old Boss (1942)
- Love Me (1942)
- Love Premiere (1943)
- Beloved Darling (1943)
- Nora (1944)
- Life Calls (1944)
- Third from the Right (1950)
- Melody of Fate (1950)
- Professor Nachtfalter (1951)
- Maya of the Seven Veils (1951)
- Queen of the Arena (1952)
- Dunja (1955)
- Three Days Confined to Barracks (1955)
- Three Birch Trees on the Heath (1956)
- Der Etappenhase (1957)
- I Learned That in Paris (1960)
- The Gorilla of Soho (1968)
- The Man with the Glass Eye (1969)
