= Queen of the Arena =

1952 film

- Directed by: Rolf Meyer
- Written by: Gerhart Hauptmann (novel Wanda); Rolf Meyer; Kurt E. Walter
- Produced by: Alexander Grüter; Herbert Sennewald
- Starring: Maria Litto; Hans Söhnker; Jan Hendriks
- Cinematography: Igor Oberberg
- Edited by: Hermann Leitner
- Music by: Michael Jary
- Production company: Corona Film
- Distributed by: Herzog Film
- Release date: 19 December 1952
- Running time: 81 minutes
- Country: West Germany
- Language: German

Queen of the Arena (German: Königin der Arena) is a 1952 West German musical drama film directed by Rolf Meyer and starring Maria Litto, Hans Söhnker and Jan Hendriks. It contains elements of both the revue film and the circus film genres. It was shot at the Bendestorf Studios near Hamburg and on location around Sorrento in Italy. The film's sets were designed by the art director Franz Schroedter.

== Cast ==
- Maria Litto as Margarita, Tänzerin
- Hans Söhnker as Professor Gerhart Mahnke, Bildhauer
- Jan Hendriks as Tonio, Artist
- Grethe Weiser as Constance Caselli, Zirkusdirektorin
- Paul Kemp as Fritz Zwickel, Faktotum Mahnkes
- Camilla Horn as Diana Bianca, Dompteuse
- Peter Alexander as Singer
- Horst Beck as Manegeclown
- Erwin Bredow as Dancer
- Bully Buhlan as Singer
- Lonny Kellner as Singer
- Helmut Ketels as Dancer
- Ernesto Kühne as Dresseur
- Bruce Low as Singer
- Michael Piel as Dancer
- Guenter Schnittjer as Singer
- Max Walter Sieg
- Jockel Stahl as Dancer
- Fred Weyrich as Singer
- Horst Winter as Singer
- Helmut Zacharias as Dirigent

== Bibliography ==
- Hans-Michael Bock and Tim Bergfelder. The Concise Cinegraph: An Encyclopedia of German Cinema. Berghahn Books, 2009.
