= Red Roses, Red Lips, Red Wine =

1953 film

- John van Dreelen and Gardy Granass
- Directed by: Paul Martin
- Written by: Jacob Geis; Bobby E. Lüthge
- Produced by: Willie Hoffmann-Andersen
- Starring: Gardy Granass; John Van Dreelen; Rolf von Nauckhoff
- Cinematography: Albert Benitz
- Edited by: Martha Dübber
- Music by: Michael Harden; Wolfgang Zeller
- Production company: Apollo-Film
- Distributed by: Deutsche London-Film
- Release date: 18 September 1953
- Running time: 100 minutes
- Country: West Germany
- Language: German

Red Roses, Red Lips, Red Wine (German: Rote Rosen, rote Lippen, roter Wein) is a 1953 West German romantic drama film directed by Paul Martin and starring Gardy Granass, John Van Dreelen, and Rolf von Nauckhoff. It shares its title with a popular song of the same era. It was made at the Tempelhof Studios in West Berlin. The film's sets were designed by the art director Erich Kettelhut.

== Cast ==
- Gardy Granass as Nora Krüger
- John Van Dreelen as Hans Westhoff
- Rolf von Nauckhoff as Kunsthändler Thormann
- Margarete Haagen as Westhoffs Mutter
- Lil Dagover as Gräfin Waldenberg
- Hans Richter as Alfred Berg
- Siegfried Breuer as Polizeipräfekt
- Peter Mosbacher as Pole
- Jeanette Schultze as Bianca, junge Italienerin
- Hans Stiebner as Barwirt in Neapel
- Otto Gebühr
- Erich Dunskus
- Arno Paulsen
- Willi Schaeffers
- Stanislav Ledinek
- René Carol as Singer.'Rote Rosen rote Lippen roter wein'
- Lale Andersen as English Vocal
- Franz-Otto Krüger
- Eva Katharina Schultz
- Kurt Waitzmann

== Bibliography ==
- Bock, Hans-Michael; Bergfelder, Tim, eds. (2009). The Concise Cinegraph: Encyclopaedia of German Cinema. New York: Berghahn Books. ISBN 978-1-57181-655-9.
