= Gisela Schlüter =

German cabaret performer and actress (1914–1995)

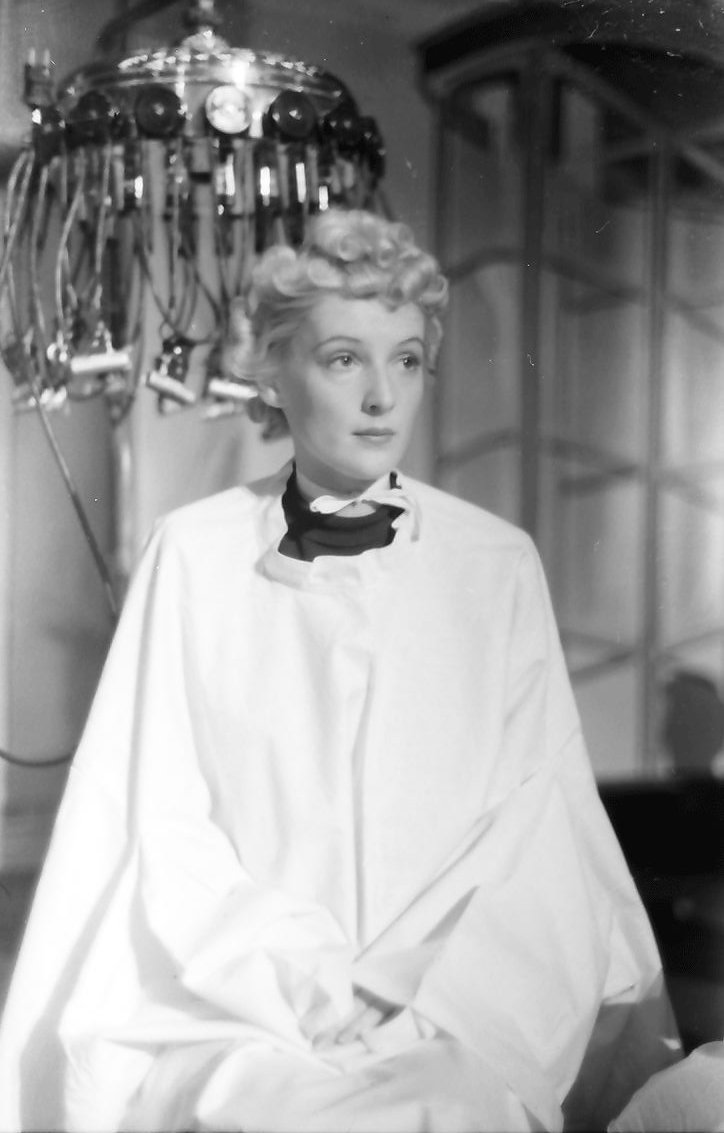
- Schlüter in Kabarett der Komiker, 1938
- Born: 6 June 1914; Berlin, Germany
- Died: 28 October 1995 (aged 81); Mittenwald, Bavaria, Germany
- Resting place: Bad Kohlgrub
- Occupations: Actress; cabaret performer
- Years active: 1928–1988
- Partner: Hans Hubberten (1968–1988)

Gisela Schlüter (6 June 1914 – 28 October 1995) was a German cabaret performer and actress.

== Early life ==
Schlüter was born in Berlin and grew up in Dresden. Her father was an army officer and her mother came from Czechoslovakia. She studied acting the Dresden actor Erich Ponto.

== Career ==
She began her acting career at the age of 19. In her first year of work she was in four film productions. Later she worked mainly in cabaret, with a few film appearances. Her stage debut was in Berlin in the tabloid play Caution Brigitte, in which she showed her talent as a quick speaker.

Films she was in include We Dance Around the World (1939), The Tiger of Eschnapur (1937/38), A Night in May (1938), The Indian Tomb (1937/38), Six Days Home Leave (1941) and Our Auntie Is The Last (1973). In the post-war period, along with many theater tours, she was the star of the Hamburg cabaret revue Faust, part three.

Schlüter had her first small television appearance in Vico Torriani's show Grüezi Vico. After guest appearances in television shows, she received her own television show on 25 January 1963 at the NDR in Hamburg, entitled Zwischenmahlzeit, in which she was a comedian and entertainer. During this time, she became a show master who, through her dominant verbal rhetoric, barely let her stage partners have their say. Her speaking speed (up to 482 syllables per minute) and her seemingly never-ending torrent of speech became her trademarks. This resulted in her nicknames "Lady Schnatterly" and "Chatterbox of the Nation".

In 1982 Zwischenmahlzeit was broadcast four times a year, reaching ratings of up to 44%. In 1976, Schlüter received the Golden Camera from the television magazine HÖRZU for her show.

== Personal life ==
Her long-term partner, the television writer Hans Hubberten, wrote all 35 episodes of Zwischenmahlzeit for her.

On 28 October 1995 she died of a stroke at the age of 81.

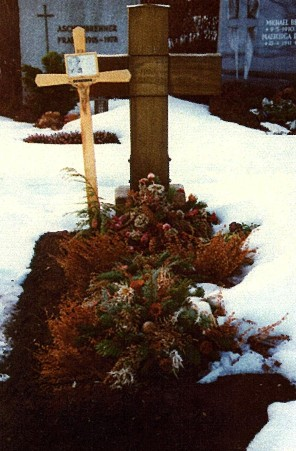
Schlüter's grave, Bad Kohlgrub.

== Filmography ==
- 1937/38: Der Tiger von Eschnapur
- 1937/38: Das indische Grabmal
- 1937: Das Ehesanatorium
- 1938: Fools in the Snow
- 1938: Eine Nacht im Mai
- 1941: Der Gasmann
- 1950: Dreizehn unter einem Hut
- 1957: Mikosch, der Stolz der Kompanie
- 1957: Die große Chance
- 1959: Peter schiesst den Vogel ab
- 1972: The Merry Quartet from the Filling Station
- 1973: Unsere Tante ist das Letzte
- 1973: Das Wandern ist Herrn Müllers Lust
