= I'll Never Forget That Night =

1949 film

- Directed by: Johannes Meyer
- Written by: Gustav Fröhlich (idea); Bobby E. Lüthge; Rolf Meyer
- Produced by: Rolf Meyer
- Starring: Gustav Fröhlich; Winnie Markus; Paul Henckels
- Cinematography: Albert Benitz
- Edited by: Martha Dübber
- Music by: Werner Eisbrenner
- Production company: Junge Film-Union Rolf Meyer
- Distributed by: Bavaria Film
- Release date: 3 May 1949
- Running time: 108 minutes
- Language: German

I'll Never Forget That Night (German: Diese Nacht vergess ich nie) is a 1949 German comedy film directed by Johannes Meyer and starring Gustav Fröhlich, Winnie Markus and Paul Henckels. It was shot at the Bendestorf Studios near Hamburg. The film's sets were designed by the art director Erich Grave.

== Cast ==
- Gustav Fröhlich as Dr. Paul Schröter
- Winnie Markus as Eva Surén
- Paul Henckels as Dr. Max Schröter
- Hardy Krüger as Eugen Schröter
- Jester Naefe as Yvonne Rödern
- Ernst Waldow as Camillo Brause
- Hans Schwarz Jr. as Franz Bauer
- Inge Landgut as Lucie
- Charlotte Witthauer as Josefa Bauer
- Albert Florath as Hendrick Surén
- Willi Schaeffers as Hugo Morall
- Hans Richter as Dick Jaefferson
- Elise Aulinger as Therese
- Ludwig Dose as Attila Kornewitz
- Carl Voscherau as Gemeindevorsteher Kußmaul
- Hans Harloff
- Herbert A.E. Böhme as Polizist
- Detlev Lais as Sänger

== Bibliography ==
- Bock, Hans-Michael & Bergfelder, Tim. The Concise Cinegraph: Encyclopaedia of German Cinema. Berghahn Books, 2009.
