= Between the Parents =

1938 film

- Directed by: Hans Hinrich
- Written by: Eva Leidmann
- Produced by: Ernst Krüger; Hans Herbert Ulrich; Georg Witt
- Starring: Willy Fritsch; Jutta Freybe; Gusti Huber
- Cinematography: Otto Baecker
- Edited by: Herbert B. Fredersdorf
- Music by: Werner Bochmann
- Production company: UFA
- Distributed by: UFA
- Release date: 2 March 1938
- Running time: 85 minutes
- Country: Germany
- Language: German

Between the Parents (German: Zwischen den Eltern) is a 1938 German drama film directed by Hans Hinrich and starring Willy Fritsch, Jutta Freybe, and Gusti Huber. It was shot at the Babelsberg Studios in Potsdam. The film's sets were designed by the art directors Wilhelm Depenau and Ludwig Reiber.

== Synopsis ==
A doctor of tropical diseases lives a contended life with his wife and young son. However, after a car crash with Lisa, a former student of his now working as a journalist, he apparently becomes infatuated with her, putting his family's stability at risk.

== Cast ==
- Willy Fritsch as Dr. Hans Ravenborg, Arzt
- Jutta Freybe as Inge, seine Frau
- Peter Dann as Peter, beider Kind
- Gusti Huber as Lisa Brinkmann, Journalistin
- Erna Morena as Frau Hansen, Inges Mutter
- Hans Brausewetter as Franz Fischer, Redakteur
- Friedrich Kayßler as Professor Heyde
- Hans Leibelt as Dr. Feldern, Lawyer
- Ewald Wenck as Friedrich, Laboratoriumsdiener
- Hellmuth Bergmann as Arzt im Tropeninstitut
- Charlotte Fredersdorf as Studentin bei der Vorlesung
- Maria Krahn as Eine Mutter bei Inge zum Kaffee
- Loni Michelis as Mädchen bei Dr. Ravenborg
- Leo Peukert as Autofahrer
- Else Reval as Frau im Auto
- Ernst G. Schiffner as Hencke, Kommissar
- Ruth Störmer as Eine Mutter bei Inge zum Kaffee
- Georg Völkel as Peters Lehrer
- Rose Vollborn as Erika, Krankenschwester
- Walter Flamm as Student bei der Vorlesung
- Lore Siebert as Blumenverkäuferin
- Albert Venohr as Mechaniker in der Garage

== Bibliography ==
- Bock, Hans-Michael; Bergfelder, Tim, eds. (2009). The Concise Cinegraph: Encyclopaedia of German Cinema. New York: Berghahn Books. ISBN 978-1-57181-655-9.
- Klaus, Ulrich J. (1988). Deutsche Tonfilme: Jahrgang 1938. Klaus-Archiv. ISBN 978-3927352049.
