= Hanneles Himmelfahrt (film) =

1934 film

- Directed by: Thea von Harbou
- Screenplay by: Thea von Harbou
- Based on: The Assumption of Hannele by Gerhart Hauptmann
- Produced by: Gabriel Levy
- Starring: Inge Landgut
- Cinematography: Robert Baberske
- Edited by: Fritz C. Mauch
- Music by: Gottfried Huppertz
- Production company: Aafa-Film
- Release date: 13 April 1934
- Running time: 66 minutes
- Country: Germany
- Language: German

Hanneles Himmelfahrt is a 1934 German drama film directed by Thea von Harbou and starring Inge Landgut. It is set in a small mountain village and tells the story of Hannele, an unhappy girl who is beaten by her stepfather and tries to commit suicide. The film is based on the play The Assumption of Hannele by Gerhart Hauptmann. It has strong Christian themes.

An earlier adaptation of the play directed by Urban Gad was released in 1922. Harbou was best known as a screenwriter; Hanneles Himmelfahrt was her second and last film as director. It premiered in Berlin on 13 April 1934.

== Plot ==
Hannele grows up without her biological parents in a small mountain village, where she lives with her stepfather, the bricklayer Mattern. After he severely abuses her, she flees the house. Unable to cope with the shame and humiliation she has suffered, the deeply religious Hannele attempts to take her own life. She is rescued at the last moment by Seidel, a forestry worker, who places her in the care of the compassionate teacher Gottwald.

Hannele continues to suffer emotionally and is frequently awakened at night by fever and convulsions. She is eventually taken to a poorhouse, but finds no peace there. She continues to have dreams in which she encounters her beloved mother, who has already died. In these dreams, Hannele experiences a carefree childhood existence, only to awaken repeatedly and confront reality once more.

== Cast ==
- Inge Landgut as Hannele
- Rudolf Klein-Rogge as Mattern, her stepfather
- Käte Haack as sister Martha
- Theodor Loos as Gottwald, teacher
- Elisabeth Wendt as Hete
- Else Ehser as Tulpe
- Ilse Fürstenberg as Wirtin
- Paul Rehkopf as Wirt
- Alfred Stratmann as Schmidt, forest worker
- Hans Mitzlaff as Hanke
