= Erich Ebermayer =

German writer

- Born: 14 September 1900; Bamberg, Bavaria, German Empire
- Died: 22 September 1970 (aged 70); Terracina, Latina, Italy
- Occupation: Writer

Erich Ebermayer (14 September 1900 – 22 September 1970) was a German writer of plays, novels and articles. He was also a screenwriter involved with around thirty films including the 1937 historical production Madame Bovary.

== Selected filmography ==
- The Green Domino (1935)
- The Dreamer (1936)
- The Hour of Temptation (1936)
- His Daughter is Called Peter (1936)
- Madame Bovary (1937)
- An Enemy of the People (1937)
- Love Can Lie (1937)
- All Lies (1938)
- The Right to Love (1939)
- We Make Music (1942)
- The Golden Spider (1943)
- Philharmonic (1944)
- The Black Robe (1944)
- Canaris (1954)
- The Immenhof Girls (1955)
- One Woman Is Not Enough? (1955)
- The Blue Moth (1959)

== Bibliography ==
- Goble, Alan. The Complete Index to Literary Sources in Film. Walter de Gruyter, 1999.
- Paietta, Ann & Kauppila, Jean. Health Professionals on Screen. Scarecrow Press, 1999.
