= Rolf Meyer =

German screenwriter, producer and director

- Born: 12 November 1910; Bad Suderode; German Empire
- Died: 3 February 1963 (aged 52); Todtglüsingen; West Germany
- Occupations: Screenwriter, Producer, Director
- Years active: 1935–1956

Rolf Meyer (12 November 1910 – 3 February 1963) was a German screenwriter, film producer and director.

== Selected filmography ==
=== Screenwriter ===
- Victoria (1935)
- Augustus the Strong (1936)
- Escapade (1936)
- Uncle Bräsig (1936)
- The Divine Jetta (1937)
- A German Robinson Crusoe (1940)
- The Bath in the Barn (1943)
- Young Hearts (1944)
- Zugvögel (1947)
- I'll Never Forget That Night (1949)
- Verlobte Leute (1950)
- Queen of the Arena (1952)
- The Bath in the Barn (1956)

=== Producer ===
- Paths in Twilight (1948)
- The Prisoner (1949)
- This Man Belongs to Me (1950)
- Melody of Fate (1950)
- Taxi-Kitty (1950)
- Thirteen Under One Hat (1950)
- The Lie (1950)
- Miracles Still Happen (1951)
- Sensation in San Remo (1951)
- The Csardas Princess (1951)
- The Sinner (1951)

=== Director ===
- Zugvögel (1947)
- Menschen in Gottes Hand (1948)
- Gaspary's Sons (1948)
- The Beautiful Galatea (1950)
- Professor Nachtfalter (1951)
- Queen of the Arena (1952)

== Bibliography ==
- Fehrenbach, Heide. Cinema in Democratizing Germany: Reconstructing National Identity After Hitler. University of North Carolina Press, 1995.
