= Martha Dübber =

German film editor

- Occupation: Editor
- Years active: 1930-1962

Martha Dübber was a German film editor. She worked on more than eighty productions between 1930 and 1962.

== Selected filmography ==
- Kohlhiesel's Daughters (1930)
- 24 Hours in the Life of a Woman (1931)
- The Escape to Nice (1932)
- The House of Dora Green (1933)
- At the Strasbourg (1934)
- Paganini (1934)
- A Woman of No Importance (1936)
- The Ruler (1937)
- Dance on the Volcano (1938)
- The Fourth Is Not Coming (1939)
- Robert Koch (1939)
- People in the Storm (1941)
- Die Entlassung (1942)
- An Old Heart Becomes Young Again (1943)
- Gaspary's Sons (1948)
- The Prisoner (1949)
- I'll Never Forget That Night (1949)
- The Beautiful Galatea (1950)
- This Man Belongs to Me (1950)
- Thirteen Under One Hat (1950)
- The Lie (1950)
- Taxi-Kitty (1950)
- Sensation in San Remo (1951)
- Professor Nachtfalter (1951)
- The Csardas Princess (1951)
- Klettermaxe (1952)
- Weekend in Paradise (1952)
- We'll Talk About Love Later (1953)
- Red Roses, Red Lips, Red Wine (1953)
- The Rose of Stamboul (1953)
- Life Begins at Seventeen (1953)
- The Private Secretary (1953)
- The Little Czar (1954)
- My Sister and I (1954)
- The Big Star Parade (1954)
- Ball at the Savoy (1955)
- Music, Music and Only Music (1955)
- Three Girls from the Rhine (1955)
- Three Days Confined to Barracks (1955)
- Tired Theodore (1957)
- Aunt Wanda from Uganda (1957)
- Widower with Five Daughters (1957)
- Escape from Sahara (1958)
- Father, Mother and Nine Children (1958)
- Night Nurse Ingeborg (1958)
- Triplets on Board (1959)
- The Last Pedestrian (1960)
- Barbara (1961)
- The Gypsy Baron (1962)
- Her Most Beautiful Day (1962)
