= Erich Grave =

German art director

- Born: 22 March 1891; Leipzig, Saxony, German Empire
- Died: 19 August 1955 (aged 64); West Berlin, West Germany
- Occupation: Art director
- Years active: 1927-1954 (film)

Erich Grave (1891–1955) was a German art director.

== Selected filmography ==
- Behind the Altar (1927)
- Don't Lose Heart, Suzanne! (1935)
- Maria the Maid (1936)
- The Call of the Jungle (1936)
- A Night in May (1938)
- The Fourth Is Not Coming (1939)
- The Fire Devil (1940)
- Her Private Secretary (1940)
- My Wife Theresa (1942)
- Bravo Acrobat! (1943)
- The Enchanted Day (1944)
- Paths in Twilight (1948)
- Gaspary's Sons (1948)
- I'll Never Forget That Night (1949)
- The Guilt of Doctor Homma (1951)
- The Uncle from America (1953)
- The Abduction of the Sabine Women (1954)
- Clivia (1954)

== Bibliography ==
- Giesen, Rolf. Nazi Propaganda Films: A History and Filmography. McFarland, 2003.
