= The Assumption of Hannele =

1893 play written by Gerhart Hauptmann

The Ascension of Little Hannele
- Original language: German
- Written by: Gerhart Hauptmann
- Genre: Symbolism

Premiere
- Date: 14 November 1893

The Ascension of Little Hannele (German: Hanneles Himmelfahrt), also known simply as Hannele, is an 1893 play by the German playwright Gerhart Hauptmann. In contrast to Hauptmann's naturalistic dramas, The Assumption of Hannele adopts a more symbolist dramaturgy and includes a dream sequence. The play is the first in recorded world literature with a child as its heroine. The play tells the story of a neglected and abused peasant child, who, on her deathbed, experiences a vision of divine powers welcoming her into the afterlife. It was first published in 1894. Hauptmann was awarded the Grillparzer Prize in 1896 for the play.

== Production history ==
The play received its première under the title Hannele at the Königliches Schauspielhaus in Berlin, opening on 14 November 1893. The production was directed by Max Grube, with music by Max Marschalk. The cast included Adalbert Matkowsky.

The play was directed by the seminal Russian theatre practitioner Constantin Stanislavski with his Society of Art and Literature in Moscow, in a production that opened on 14 April [O.S. 2 April] 1896. At the request of Vladimir Nemirovich-Danchenko, who considered Hauptmann to be a playwright superior to Henrik Ibsen, the play was to be included in the repertoire of the first season of their world-famous Moscow Art Theatre. At the play's first read-through, it reduced the entire company, with the exception of Vsevolod Meyerhold (who had been cast as the Angel of Death), to tears. On 8 November [O.S. 27 October] 1898, however, the production was banned, following protests made by the Russian Orthodox Church, despite having been passed by the censor.

Productions in the United States include one in New York at the Fifth Avenue Theatre, which opened on 1 May 1894, a second at the Lyceum Theatre, which opened on 11 April 1910 and which featured Minnie Fiske, and a third at the Cort Theatre, which opened on 15 February 1924, and included both Eva LeGallienne and Basil Rathbone in the cast. British productions include one in Liverpool in 1913 in which both Gertrude Lawrence and Noël Coward were involved and another in London in 1924.

== Adaptations ==
In 1922 the Danish film director Urban Gad directed a cinematic adaptation of the play with German titles. Thea von Harbou adapted the play for another German cinematic version, also titled Hanneles Himmelfahrt, which she directed in 1934. The play also formed the basis for Paul Graener and George Graener's opera Hanneles Himmelfahrt, which was first performed on 17 February 1927. An opera titled Hannele was also written by Italian composer Antonio Guarnieri and recorded by RAI in 1971.

== Sources ==
- Banham, Martin, ed. 1998. The Cambridge Guide to Theatre. Cambridge: Cambridge UP. ISBN 0-521-43437-8.
- Bédé, Jean-Albert, and William B. Edgerton, eds. 1980. Columbia Dictionary of Modern European Literature. 2nd rev. ed. New York: Columbia UP. ISBN 0-231-03717-1.
- Benedetti, Jean. 1999. Stanislavski: His Life and Art. Revised edition. Original edition published in 1988. London: Methuen. ISBN 0-413-52520-1.
- Brockett, Oscar G. and Franklin J. Hildy. 2003. History of the Theatre. Ninth edition, International edition. Boston: Allyn and Bacon. ISBN 0-205-41050-2.
- Day, Barry, ed. 2007. The Letters of Noel Coward. London: Methuen. ISBN 1-4081-0675-2.
- Hartnoll, Phyllis, ed. 1983. The Oxford Companion to the Theatre. 4th ed. Oxford: Oxford UP. ISBN 0-19-211546-4.
- Morley, Sheridan. 1981. Gertrude Lawrence. New York: McGraw-Hill. ISBN 0-07-043149-3.
- Worrall, Nick. 1996. The Moscow Art Theatre. Theatre Production Studies ser. London and NY: Routledge. ISBN 0-415-05598-9.
