= Adrian der Tulpendieb =

- Starring: Heinz Reincke
- Country of origin: West Germany

Original release
- Network: Deutsches Fernsehen
- Release: April 18 – April 23, 1966

Adrian der Tulpendieb is a 1966 West German television series. It was the first that aired in full color. Six episodes were produced, which were based on the novel by Otto Rombach and directed by Dietrich Haugk. The official start of color television in Germany was not until August 25, 1967. The series was later repeated on ARD's early evening program.

== See also ==
- List of German television series
