= Human Fly =

Human Fly was the nickname of numerous stunt entertainers of the 20th century who would scale the exteriors of tall buildings in the United States:

- Harry Gardiner (born 1871, active 1905–1929) in the U.S., before moving to Europe
- "Steeplejack" Charles Miller (active 1900–1910)
- George Polley (active 1910–1920)
- Henry Roland (1894-1937)
- John Ciampa (active 1942–1952)
- George Willig, who climbed New York City's World Trade Center in 1977

The Human Fly may also refer to:

- Rick Rojatt, a costumed Canadian stunt rider active in the 1970s
- Human Fly (character), three fictional characters in Marvel comic books (one of whom was based on Rojatt)
- Human Fly (song), a 1978 song by The Cramps
- the activity of Velcro jumping
- a 1972 album by Richard Thompson titled Henry the Human Fly
- The Human Flies, a crime novel by Hans Olav Lahlum

== See also ==
- Buildering
