= Gizmo! =

- Directed by: Howard Smith
- Produced by: Howard Smith
- Release date: 1977
- Running time: 77 min.
- Country: United States
- Language: English

Gizmo! is a 1977 documentary film produced and directed by Howard Smith about improbable inventions, and uses old newsreel footage about these inventions. Early examples of parkour and buildering are also featured, including footage of an urban acrobat, John Ciampa (the "Brooklyn Tarzan"), Frank "Cannonball" Richards and a stuntman, Arnim Dahl.
