= List of stunt performers nicknamed the "Human Fly" =

This is a list of stunt performers nicknamed by themselves or others as the "Human Fly."

- Harry Gardiner
- "Steeplejack" Charles Miller
- George Polley
- Henry Roland
- John Ciampa
- George Willig
