= Night climbing =

Climbing public buildings under cover of darkness

Night climbing is a term used, principally at the Oxford and Cambridge universities in England, to describe the sport of climbing up the walls of colleges and public buildings, and exploring the rooftops. This activity is frowned on by college authorities, so it is mainly done under cover of darkness, to avoid detection.

The sport is a subset of buildering, or urban climbing, and is distinguished by the fact that it is usually carried out nocturnally by university students.

The original term for this activity was "roof climbing". The alternative term "night climbing" was introduced in the late 1930s, and has become the standard term.

== History ==
In 1895, the alpinist Geoffrey Winthrop Young started to climb the roofs of Cambridge University. Students had been scrambling up the university buildings for years, but Young was the first to document this activity. He wrote and published a night climbing guide to Trinity College.

In 1905, while a master at Eton College, Young produced his second book, a small volume on buildering, entitled "Wall and Roof Climbing". This was a very erudite work, containing a rich variety of quotations from writers of many different periods and cultures.

In 1921, inspired by Young's guide to Trinity, a group of undergraduates, including Hartley, Grag and Darlington, published a night climbing guide to St John's College.

In 1930, John Hurst wrote the second edition of the guide to Trinity.

In 1937, The Night Climbers of Cambridge, a more comprehensive, though still light-hearted, account of Cambridge undergraduate night climbing appeared in popular print, written by Noël Howard Symington, under the pseudonym "Whipplesnaith".

Night climbing remained popular in Cambridge after World War II. In 1960, Richard Williams wrote the third edition of the Trinity guide. In 1970, a book entitled "Cambridge Nightclimbing" was published under the pseudonym "Hederatus". Night climbing also featured prominently in a book by F A Reeve, entitled "Varsity Rags and Hoaxes", published in 1977, in the detective novel The Bad Quarto by Jill Paton Walsh, published in 2007 and in Michael Ondaatje's Warlight, which cites this book.

== Popular culture ==
In recent years, a number of books on night climbing in Cambridge have been published by Oleander Press, of Cambridge, as follows:

- In 2007, they reprinted the Whipplesnaith book.
- In 2009, they reprinted Geoffrey Winthrop Young's first edition of the Trinity Guide, and the St John's Guide.
- In 2010, they reprinted John Hurst's second edition of the Trinity Guide, and Young's book "Wall and Roof Climbing".
- In 2011, they published an omnibus edition of the three Trinity guides, including an introduction by Richard Williams which reviewed the history of night climbing in Cambridge from the 18th century to the present day. This introduction removed the cloak of anonymity that had previously protected the identities of the first nocturnal explorers. This book is the most significant addition to the night climbing literature that has been published in recent years.

In 2007, Corpus Christi alumnus Ivo Stourton published the novel The Night Climbers which is based on a group of students who engage in the practice.

== Famous night climbers ==
In the 1930s, Whipplesnaith (Noël Symington) climbed many buildings in Cambridge, England.

In 1895, Geoffrey Winthrop Young pioneered the sport of night climbing in Cambridge, England. The identification of the first Cambridge night climber remains an open question, but Young is generally regarded as the original pioneer.

From 2016 to 2018, a group of Nocturnal climbers began posting images to anonymous confession Facebook pages, detailing climbs conducted at Christ Church, Corpus Christi College, Pembroke College, Westgate, Cornmarket Street, and several other high-profile locations. Each public post contained content of a political or philosophical nature, with advice given sometimes in the form of an Agony Aunt. The local media dubbed the group "The Night Climbers of Oxford", for their identities remained unknown. Despite some back lash, the public showed support for the group and their controversial acts. As a result, they quickly became part of Oxford's urban and night-life culture.

During his time studying mathematics at Trinity College, Cambridge, Freeman Dyson was known to have practiced night climbing.

== See also ==
- BASE jumping
- Buildering
- Doorways in the Sand
- Parkour
- Safety Last!
- The Night Climbers of Cambridge
- The Night Climbers of Oxford

== Locations ==
- Cambridge University, England
- Oxford University, England
- University of British Columbia, Vancouver, Canada
- University of California, Berkeley
