= Secret society =

Organization hiding details from non-members

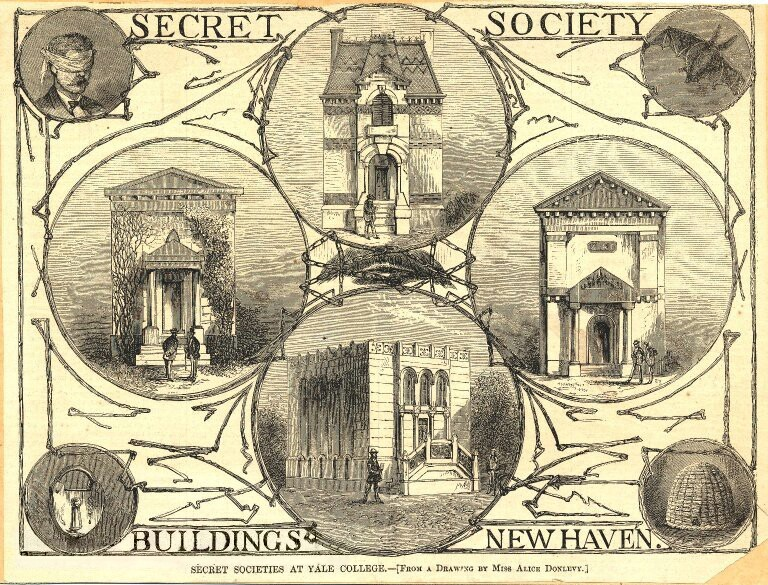
"Secret Society Buildings at Yale College" by Alice Donlevy c. 1880. Pictured are: Psi Upsilon (Beta chapter), 120 High Street. Left center: Skull and Bones (Russell Trust Association), 64 High Street. Right center: Delta Kappa Epsilon (Phi chapter), east side of York Street, south of Elm Street. Bottom: Scroll and Key (Kingsley Trust SSS Nonse Association), 490 College Street.

A secret society is an organization about which the activities, events, inner functioning, membership, and sometimes also existence, are concealed. The term usually excludes covert groups, such as intelligence agencies or guerrilla warfare insurgencies, that hide their activities and memberships but maintain a public presence.

Secret societies may be community-based or associated with colleges and universities. These societies exist in countries around the world.

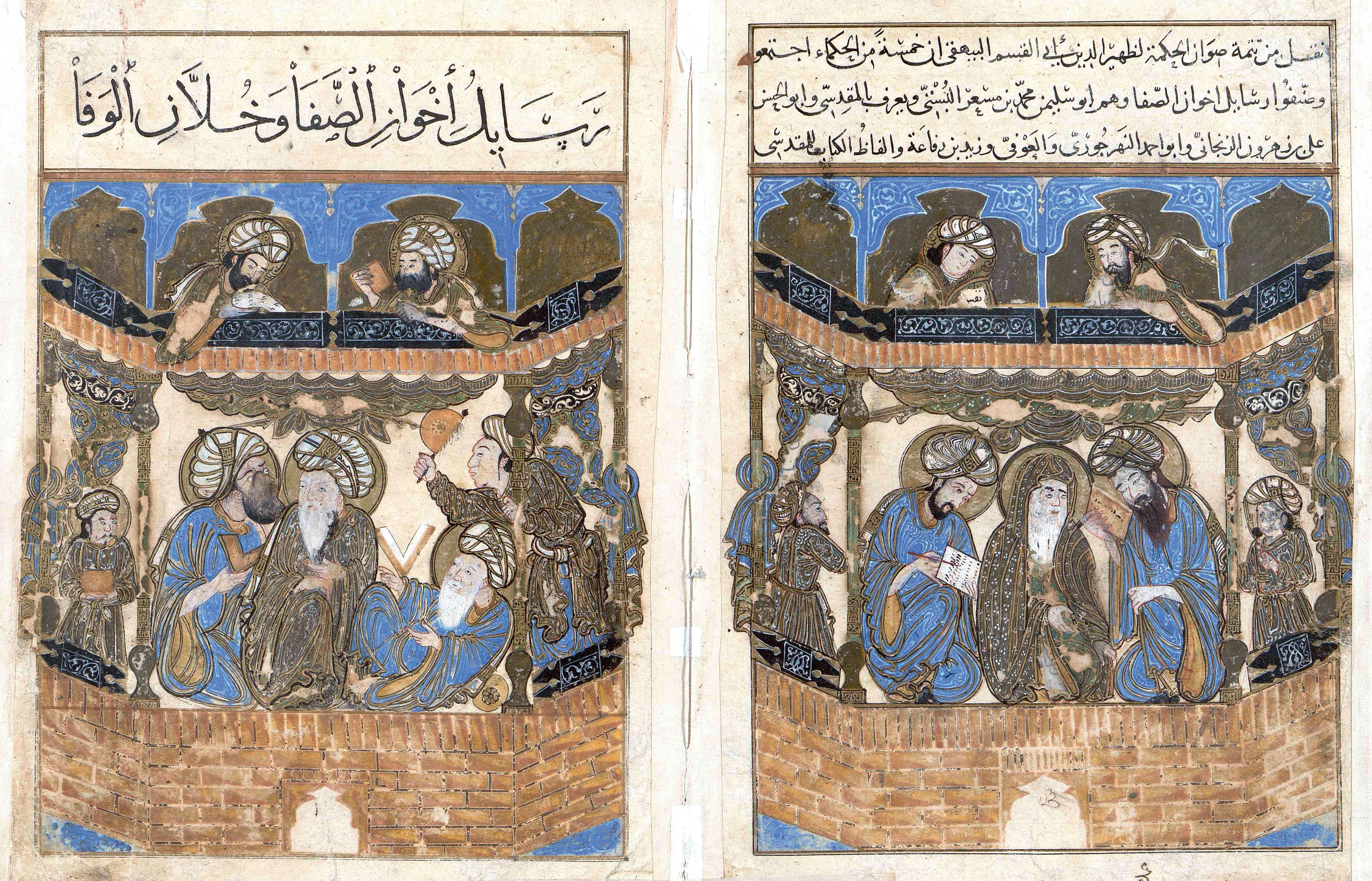
The Brethren of Purity were a secret society of Muslim philosophers in Basra, Iraq, in the 9th or 10th century CE.

== Definitions ==
The exact qualifications for labeling a group a secret society are disputed, but definitions generally rely on the degree to which the organization insists on secrecy and might involve the retention and transmission of secret knowledge, the denial of membership or knowledge of the group, the creation of personal bonds between members of the organization, and the use of secret rites or rituals.

Anthropologically and historically, secret societies have been deeply interlinked with the concept of the Männerbund, the all-male "warrior-band" or "warrior-society" of pre-modern cultures (see H. Schurtz, Alterklassen und Männerbünde, Berlin, 1902; A. Van Gennep, The Rites of Passage, Chicago, 1960).

A purported "family tree of secret societies" has been proposed, although it may not be comprehensive.

Alan Axelrod, author of the International Encyclopedia of Secret Societies and Fraternal Orders, defines a secret society as an organization that:

- is exclusive
- claims to own special secrets
- shows a strong inclination to favor its members.

Historian Richard B. Spence of the University of Idaho offered a similar three-pronged definition:

- The group's existence is usually not kept secret, but some beliefs or practices are concealed from the public and require an oath of secrecy and loyalty to learn.
- The group promises superior status or knowledge to members.
- The group's membership is in some way restrictive, such as by race, sex, religious affiliation, or invitation only.

Spence also proposes a sub-category of "Elite Secret Societies" (composed of high-income or socially influential people) and notes that secret societies have a frequent if not universal tendency towards factionalism, infighting, and claiming origins older than can be reliably documented. Spence's definition includes groups traditionally thought of as secret societies (Freemasons and Rosicrucians) and other groups not so traditionally classified such as certain organized crime cabals (the Mafia), religious groups (Order of Assassins and Thelema) and political movements (Black Hand and Black Dragon Society).

Historian Jasper Ridley says that Freemasonry is "the world's most powerful secret Society".

The organization "Opus Dei" (Latin for "Work of God") is portrayed as a "secret society" of the Catholic Church. Critics such as the Jesuit Wladimir Ledóchowski sometimes refer to Opus Dei as a Catholic (or Christian or "white") form of Freemasonry. Other critics label Opus Dei as "Holy Mafia" or "Santa Mafia"

The National Christian Association (1868–1983) is an example of an organization opposed to secret societies.

== Realms ==
=== Politics ===
Because some secret societies have political aims, they are illegal in several countries. Italy (Constitution of Italy, Section 2, Articles 13–28) and Poland, for example, ban secret political parties and political organizations in their constitutions.

=== Colleges and universities ===
Many student societies established on university campuses in the United States have been considered secret societies. Perhaps one of the most famous secret collegiate societies is Skull and Bones at Yale University. The influence of undergraduate secret societies at colleges such as Harvard College, Cornell University, Florida State University, Dartmouth College, Emory University, the University of Chicago, the University of Virginia, Georgetown University, New York University, and Wellesley College has been publicly acknowledged, if anonymously and circumspectly, since the 19th century.

British universities have a long history of secret societies or quasi-secret clubs, such as the Pitt Club at Cambridge University, Bullingdon Club at Oxford University, the Kate Kennedy Club, The Kensington Club and the Praetorian Club at the University of St Andrews, and the 16' Club at St David's College. Another British secret society is the Cambridge Apostles, founded as an essay and debating society in 1820. Not all British universities host solely academic secret societies; both The Night Climbers of Cambridge and The Night Climbers of Oxford require both brains and brawn.

In France, Vandermonde is the secret society of the Conservatoire National des Arts et Métiers.

Notable examples in Canada include Episkopon at the University of Toronto's Trinity College and the Society of Thoth at the University of British Columbia.

Secret societies are disallowed in a few colleges. The Virginia Military Institute has rules that no cadet may join a secret society, and secret societies have been banned at Oberlin College from 1847 to the present, and at Princeton University since the beginning of the 20th century.

Confraternities in Nigeria are secret-society-like student groups within higher education, some of which have histories of violence and organized crime. The exact death toll from confraternity activities is unclear. One estimate in 2002 was that 250 people had been killed in campus cult-related murders in the previous decade, while the Exam Ethics Project lobby group estimated that 115 students and teachers had been killed between 1993 and 2003.

The Mandatory Monday Association is thought to operate out of a variety of Australian universities including the Australian Defence Force Academy. The Association has numerous chapters that meet only on Mondays to discuss business and carry out rituals.

The only secret society abolished and then legalized is that of The Philomaths, which is now a legitimate academic association founded on a strict selection of its members.

=== Internet ===
While their existence had been speculated for years, Internet-based secret societies first became known to the public in 2012 when Cicada 3301 began recruiting from the public via Internet-based puzzles. The goals of the society remain unknown, but it is believed to be involved in cryptography.

== Around the world ==
=== Africa ===
The following contemporary and historic secret societies formed in Africa, by country:

==== Cameroon ====
- Ekpe

==== Ghana ====
- Simo

==== The Gambia ====
- Ojeh Society

==== Guinea ====
- Poro
- Sande society

==== Ivory Coast ====
- Poro
- Sande society

==== Liberia ====
- Crocodile Society
- Poro
- Sande society

==== Mali ====
- Simo

==== Nigeria ====
- Ekpe
- Nze na Ozo
- Ogboni
- Confraternities in Nigeria

==== Sierra Leone ====
- Crocodile Society
- Leopard Society
- Ojeh Society
- Poro
- Sande society
- Simo

==== South Africa ====
- Afrikaner Broederbond
- Afrikanerbond

==== Zimbabwe ====
- Nyau

=== Asia ===
==== China ====
Secret societies played a major role in Chinese affairs for centuries. They were a key aspect of the Anti-Qing sentiments of the 20th century. After the collapse of the Qing Dynasty, they were tacitly supported by and actively collaborated with the Nationalist government. Having played prominent roles in history, they were targeted by the anti-secret society campaigns of the newly established government of the People's Republic of China during the 1950s. Examples of Chinese secret societies include:

- Society of Righteous and Harmonious Fists
- Hai San Secret Society
- Red Lanterns
- Red Spear Society
- Tiandihui, Society of the Heaven and the Earth
- Yellow Sand Society
- White Lotus
- Heavenly Kingdom of Everlasting Satisfaction

==== India ====
include:

- Paramahansa Mandali
- Abhinav Bharti

==== Japan ====
Secret societies in Japan include:

- Black Dragon Society
- Double Leaf Society
- Gen'yōsha
- Green Dragon
- Sakurakai

==== Malaysia ====
Secret societies in Malaysia include:

- Ang Soon Tong
- Ghee Hin Kongsi
- Wah Kee

==== Philippines ====
Secret societies in the Philippines include:

- La Liga Filipina
- Katipunan
- Order of Free Gardeners

==== Singapore ====
- Ang Soon Tong
- Ghee Hin Kongsi
- Salakau
- Wah Kee
- Freemasonry

=== Australia ===
==== Australia ====
Secret societies in Australia include:

- Freemasonry
- Odd Fellows
- Order of Free Gardeners
- Royal Antediluvian Order of Buffaloes
- Tong

=== Europe ===
Several secret societies existing across Europe, including:

- Ancient Order of Freesmiths (Freischmiede)
- Freemasonry
- Order of Free Gardeners
- Templars of Honor and Temperance
- Rosicrucianism

Other organizations are listed by country.

==== Albania ====
- Black Society for Salvation
- Secret Committee for the Liberation of Albania

==== Bulgaria ====
- Bulgarian Secret Central Revolutionary Committee
- Bulgarian Secret Revolutionary Brotherhood
- Macedonian Youth Secret Revolutionary Organization

==== Finland ====
- Aurora Society
- Ordo Templi Orientis
- Valhallaorden

==== France ====
- Association of the Polish Youth "Zet"
- Bourbaki group
- La Cagoule
- Carbonari
- Compagnons du Devoir
- Company of the Blessed Sacrament
- Ellinoglosso Xenodocheio
- Hiéron du Val d'Or
- Order of Free Gardeners
- Order of the Solar Temple
- Priory of Sion
- Society of the Rights of Man
- Acéphale

==== Germany ====
- Ancient Order of Freesmiths
- Association of the Polish Youth "Zet"
- Black Reichswehr
- Bund Deutscher Jugend
- Gehlen Organization
- Germanenorden
- Himmerod memorandum
- Illuminati
- Order of the New Templars
- Ordo Templi Orientis
- Schnez-Truppe
- Stille Hilfe
- Thule Society
- Tugendbund
- United Ancient Order of Druids

==== Greece ====
- Epsilon Team
- Ethniki Etaireia
- Ordo Templi Orientis

==== Ireland ====
- Defenders
- Hellfire Club
- Irish Republican Brotherhood
- Molly Maguires
- Royal Arch Purple
- Whiteboys

==== Italy ====
- Carbonari
- Fascio Operaio
- Knights of the Apocalypse
- Propaganda Due
- Sicilian Mafia

==== Ottoman Empire ====
- Committee of Union and Progress

==== Poland ====
- Association of the Polish Youth "Zet"
- Ordo Templi Orientis
- Zarzewie

==== Portugal ====
- Carbonária

==== Russia ====
- Association of the Polish Youth "Zet"
- Lyubomudry
- Ordo Templi Orientis
- Petrashevsky Circle
- Secret Macedonian-Adrianople Circle
- Southern Society of the Decembrists
- Union of Prosperity
- Union of Salvation

==== Serbia ====
- Black Hand
- Main Board for Serb Liberation
- Ordo Templi Orientis
- Serbian secret organization in eastern Bosnia
- White Hand

==== Spain ====
- The Disinherited
- Freemasonry
- Mano Negra (Black Hand)
- Order of Free Gardeners
- Ordo Templi Orientis
- Society of the Exterminating Angel
- Spanish Military Union

==== United Kingdom ====
- A∴A∴
- Bullingdon Club
- Calves' Head Club
- Cambridge Apostles
- Confederacy
- Gormogons
- 5 Hertford Street
- Hellfire Club
- Hermetic Order of the Golden Dawn
- The Horseman's Word
- Molly Maguires
- National Action
- The Night Climbers of Cambridge
- The Night Climbers of Oxford
- Nordic League
- Odd Fellows
- Odin Brotherhood
- Order of Chaeronea
- Order of Druids
- Order of Free Gardeners
- Ordo Templi Orientis
- Royal Antediluvian Order of Buffaloes
- The 16' Club
- The School of Night
- Scotch Cattle
- Sealed Knot
- Tong
- United Ancient Order of Druids

=== North America ===
==== Canada ====
Secret societies in Canada that are non-collegiate include:

- Fenians
- Freemasonry
- Hunters' Lodges
- Independent Order of Odd Fellows
- Ku Klux Klan
- Order of Free Gardeners
- Order of the Solar Temple
- Ordre de Jacques-Cartier
- Ordo Templi Orientis
- P.E.O. Sisterhood
- Tong

==== Cuba ====
- Abakuá

==== United States ====
Secret societies in the United States that are non-collegiate include:

- Abakuá
- American Protestant Association
- Brotherhood of American Yeomen
- Fenians
- Freemasonry
- Hunters' Lodges
- Knights of Columbus
- Knights of the Golden Circle
- Knights of Liberty
- Knights of Reciprocity
- Ku Klux Klan
- Molly Maguires
- Odd Fellows
- Order of Free Gardeners
- Order of the Star Spangled Banner
- QAnon
- The Order of the Third Bird
- Tong

==== Mexico ====
- Feminine Brigades of St. Joan of Arc
- El Yunque (organization)

=== South America ===
==== Brazil ====
- Shindo Renmei
- Hy-Bráz Society

== Opposition ==
The Catholic Church strongly opposed secret societies, especially the Freemasons. It did relent somewhat in the United States and allowed membership in labour unions and the Knights of Columbus, but not the Masons. Some Christian denominations continue to forbid their members from joining secret societies in the 21st century, such as the Allegheny Wesleyan Methodist Connection, Seventh-day Adventists, and the Wisconsin Evangelical Lutheran Synod.

== See also ==
- Cult
- Shadow government
- Collegiate secret societies in North America
- High school secret societies
- Magical organization
