= Steeplejack (disambiguation) =

A steeplejack is a craftsman who is prepared to scale tall buildings and in particular church steeples to carry out general repairs.

Steeplejack may also refer to:

- Steeplejack (Marvel Comics), a Marvel Comics character
- "Steeplejack" Charles Miller (1882–1910), American climber
- Steeplejack Brewing Company, a brewery with locations in Oregon
