= Epsilon Team =

Conspiracy theory

The Delphic Epsilon is the purported symbol of the Epsilon Team.

The Epsilon Team (Greek: Ομάδα Έψιλον, romanized: Omada Epsilon) is an alleged secret society that appears in modern Greek folklore, conspiracy theories and ufology. The team was first described in a 1977 book, and supposedly consists of prominent Greek people who possess secret knowledge of extraterrestrial origin. Beginning in the 1980s, literature about the society became infused with antisemitic conspiracy theories, placing the Epsilon Team in a cosmic battle against the Jews. The body of beliefs related to the Epsilon Team has been labeled epsilonism, and those who subscribe to it have been labeled epsilonists.

== History ==
Epsilon is the fifth letter of the Greek alphabet, and has a modern history as a symbol for freedom and Greece. It was notably used in this capacity during the Greek War of Independence. A precursor to the epsilonists was Spyridon Nagos, a Freemason and socialist who in the early 20th century envisioned a secret society of high-ranking Greeks, working in secret to benefit their country.

The originator of what became the modern Epsilon Team mythology was the author George Lefkofrydis. Inspired by Plutarch's text On the E at Delphi, he began to develop his theories in the 1960s. In 1977, he published the book Spaceship Epsilon: Aristotle's Organon: The Researcher, where he claimed to have discovered hidden messages in Aristotle's Organon. According to Lefkofrydis, the text reveals that Aristotle was an extraterrestrial from the star Mu in the constellation Lagos (Lepus/Rabbit). Lefkofrydis described the existence of a secret society of influential Greeks, who had extraterrestrial knowledge stemming from Aristotle, and who worked to protect the interests of the Greek people. Lefkofrydis' book was quickly withdrawn from publication, but its theories were developed further by others.

The conspiracy theory became better known in Greece around 1997 through a number of books and magazine articles. The word epsilonism was established as a term for the general phenomenon, and is usually used by people who disapprove of it. The Delphic Epsilon, which can be found on ancient Greek monuments but also on objects from the Inca civilisation, was established as the symbol of the Epsilon group.

The most prominent epsilonist writers in the 1980s and 1990s were Ioannis Fourakis, Anestis S. Keramydas, Dimosthenis Liakopoulos and Georgios Gkiolvas. Fourakis is generally considered to have coined the name Epsilon Team (Greek: Ομάδα Έψιλον, romanized: Omada Epsilon), and was also prominent in fusing epsilonism with antisemitic conspiracy theories. In Fourakis' works, the Greeks are presented as being of extraterrestrial origin, associated with the Olympian gods, and part of an ancient cosmic war against the Jews. Fourakis predicts a revival of Hellenic culture and religion, which will happen through Greek Orthodox Christianity. In 1996, the former merchant navy officer Keramydas published the book Omada E, which went on to become a bestseller. He claimed to be a member of the secret society and emphasised the racial, antisemitic and pro-Orthodox angle, and added that the Jews also were of extraterrestrial origin. In the 2000s, the phenomenon became the subject of various weblogs, websites and online discussion forums. The Greek politician and television personality Kyriakos Velopoulos published the book Epsilonism: Epsilon Team in English in 2010.

== Impact ==
The phenomenon, although fringe, is relatively well known in Greece, and has had an impact on the conspiracy theory milieu and popular culture. It is mainly popular within some right-wing anti-Semitic circles and as a fringe phenomenon among conservative Orthodox Christians. It is also present within circles that seek to fuse Christianity with spiritual Hellenicity, notably the magazine Daulos. Among Greek neopagans the phenomenon is generally ridiculed.

== Members and organisations ==
People who have been named in epsilonist literature as members include Aristotle Onassis, Alexander Onassis, Spyridon Marinatos, the publisher Ioannis Passas, the mathematician Constantin Carathéodory, the general C. Nikolaidis, the physicist Kosta Tsipis, the mayor of Athens Antonis Tritsis, the Greek-American George Tsantes who was murdered by the 17 November Group, Alexandros Bodosakis, Dimitris Liantinis and the astronomer Konstantínos Chasapis.

Several groups and individuals have claimed to represent the Epsilon Team themselves. The most publicised event occurred in October 2015, when five men were detained for the bombings of the Bank of Greece in Kalamata and the statue of Constantine XI Palaiologos in Mystras. The men belonged to a terrorist group called Team Epsilon, which also possessed a large number of explosives and firearms, and had plans for further attacks. The arrested proclaimed themselves to be pagans and claimed that their group aimed to "take down the conspiracy inflicted on Greece by the banks and by Orthodox Christianity". They had spray-painted the recognised sign of the Epsilon Team, the Delphic double "E", at the locations of their bombings.

The Club "E" Epsilon, led by the former professional marathon runner Aristotelis Kakogeorgiou, does not want to be associated with the Epsilon Team conspiracy theories. According to Kakogeorgiou, his organisation was founded in 1962 and the E stands for "Ellínon" ("Greeks"). It is open to people of all races and religions, and does not subscribe to anti-Semitism or the eschatological beliefs of epsilonism.

== See also ==
- Ancient astronauts
- Hellenocentrism
- UFO religion
