= Wedding in Transit =

1953 film

- Directed by: Paul Verhoeven
- Written by: Erich Morawsky; Lotte Neumann; Heinrich Spoerl (novel); Paul Verhoeven
- Produced by: Erich Morawsky
- Starring: Gardy Granass; Karlheinz Böhm; Gert Fröbe
- Cinematography: Willy Goldberger
- Edited by: Klaus Dudenhöfer
- Music by: Lotar Olias
- Production company: Interglobal-Film
- Distributed by: Ring-Film
- Release date: 31 December 1953
- Running time: 90 minutes
- Country: West Germany
- Language: German

Wedding in Transit (German: Hochzeit auf Reisen) is a 1953 West German comedy film directed by Paul Verhoeven and starring Gardy Granass, Karlheinz Böhm and Gert Fröbe.

It was made at the Wandsbek Studios in Hamburg. Location shooting took place in a variety of places including Munich, Lausanne in Switzerland and Elche, Granada and Madrid in Spain. The film's sets were designed by the art director Mathias Matthies.

== Cast ==
- Gardy Granass as Ilse Delius
- Karlheinz Böhm as Dr. Walter Delius
- Susi Nicoletti as Ly Ballacz
- Paul Klinger as Herr von Rupp
- Gert Fröbe as Herr Mengwasser
- Walter Gross as Gabor
- Ilse Bally as Anna Delius
- Walter Janssen as Professor Schmidt
- Günther Jerschke as Reiseteilnehmer
- Doris Kiesow as Frau Montez
- Erwin Linder as Alterer Anwalt
- Doris Rath as Reiseteilnehmerin
- Joachim Teege as Junger Anwalt

== Bibliography ==
- Jill Nelmes & Jule Selbo. Women Screenwriters: An International Guide. Palgrave Macmillan, 2015.
