= Klettermaxe (1952 film) =

1952 film

- Gentlemen thief Albert Lieven and the police detective Erwin Linder
- Directed by: Kurt Hoffmann
- Written by: Eberhard Keindorff; Hans Mahner-Mons (novel); Johanna Sibelius
- Produced by: Franz Tappers
- Starring: Liselotte Pulver; Albert Lieven; Charlott Daudert
- Cinematography: Albert Benitz
- Edited by: Martha Dübber
- Music by: Hans-Martin Majewski
- Production companies: Porta-Film; Standard-Filmverleih
- Distributed by: Europa-Filmverleih
- Release date: 15 May 1952
- Running time: 86 minutes
- Country: West Germany
- Language: German

Klettermaxe is a 1952 West German comedy crime film directed by Kurt Hoffmann and starring Liselotte Pulver, Albert Lieven and Charlott Daudert.

It was shot at the Wandsbek Studios in Hamburg. The film's sets were designed by Willi Herrmann and Heinrich Weidemann. It was a major commercial success on release, and helped to cement Pulver's reputation as a leading star.

== Plot ==
It is a remake of a 1927 silent film about a cat burglar who steals from other thieves and a young Cuban dancer who becomes fascinated by him.

== Cast ==
- Liselotte Pulver as Corry Bell
- Albert Lieven as Dr. Malien, Schriftsteller
- Charlott Daudert as Gertie
- Madelon Truß as Susanne
- Erna Sellmer as Ludmilla, Kneipenwirtin
- Harald Paulsen as Malkow
- Paul Henckels as Weingarten, Besitzer eines Modesalons
- Hubert von Meyerinck as Dobnika
- Josef Sieber as Kruschke
- Hans Schwarz Jr. as Packer
- Hans Stiebner as Krümel
- Erwin Linder as Kriminalkommissar Plessen
- Robert Meyn as Reuping, Theaterdirektor
- Heinz Klevenow as Paul
- Fritz Wagner as Warnecke
- Charlotte Bufford as Zofe Lizzy
- Alexander Hunzinger
- Elly Burgmer
- Arnim Dahl as Klettermaxe (as stunt man)

== Bibliography ==
- Bock, Hans-Michael & Bergfelder, Tim. The Concise Cinegraph: Encyclopaedia of German Cinema. Berghahn Books, 2009.
