= Erwin Linder =

German actor (1903–1968)

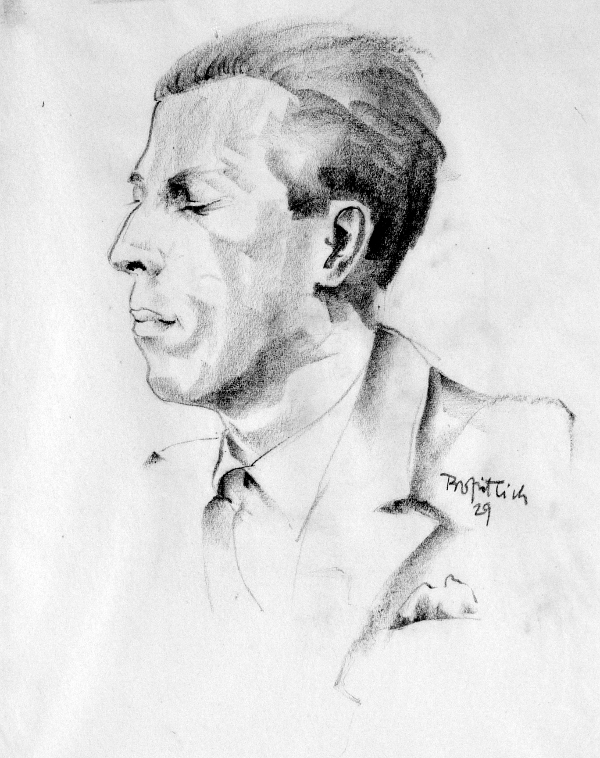
- Erwin Linder Mathias Profitlich.jpg
- Born: 29 October 1903; Weinheim, Baden-Württemberg, German Empire
- Died: 21 March 1968 (aged 64); Sylt, Schleswig-Holstein, West Germany
- Occupation: Actor
- Years active: 1936-1968 (film)

Erwin Linder (1903–1968) was a German stage, film and television actor.

== Selected filmography ==
- Only One Night (1950)
- Klettermaxe (1952)
- Dreaming Lips (1953)
- Wedding in Transit (1953)
- Don't Forget Love (1953)
- The Marriage of Doctor Danwitz (1956)
- The Zurich Engagement (1957)
- The Man Who Couldn't Say No (1958)
- The Blue Moth (1959)
- The Rest Is Silence (1959)
- The Man Who Sold Himself (1959)
- Darkness Fell on Gotenhafen (1960)
- The Woman by the Dark Window (1960)
- I Learned That in Paris (1960)
- Das Halstuch (1962, TV miniseries)
- Liselotte of the Palatinate (1966)

== Bibliography ==
- Herbert Meyer. Das Nationaltheater Mannheim: 1929-1979. Bibliographisches Institut, 1979.
