= Only One Night (1950 film) =

1950 film

- Directed by: Fritz Kirchhoff
- Written by: Gustav Kampendonk
- Produced by: Fritz Kirchhoff
- Starring: Marianne Hoppe; Hans Söhnker; Willy Maertens
- Cinematography: Ekkehard Kyrath
- Edited by: Rosemarie Weinert
- Music by: Hans-Otto Borgmann
- Production company: Pontus Film
- Distributed by: National-Film
- Release date: 21 April 1950
- Running time: 82 minutes
- Country: West Germany
- Language: German

Only One Night (German: Nur eine Nacht) is a 1950 West German drama film directed by Fritz Kirchhoff and starring Marianne Hoppe, Hans Söhnker and Willy Maertens. It was shot at the Tempelhof Studios in West Berlin. The film's sets were designed by the art director Ernst H. Albrecht. Location shooting took place on the Reeperbahn in Hamburg.

== Synopsis ==
Two strangers enjoy a brief encounter after meeting in Hamburg.

== Cast ==
- Marianne Hoppe as Die Frau
- Hans Söhnker as Der Mann
- Willy Maertens
- Lotte Klein
- Gustl Busch
- Inge Stoldt
- Reinhold Lütjohann
- Carl Voscherau
- Konrad Mayerhoff
- Otto Kuhlmann
- Erwin Linder
- Karl-Heinz Peters
- Arnim Dahl as Schläger auf der Reeperbahn
- Madelon Truß
- Lilo Müller
- Walter Scherau
- Lotte Manshardt
- Helmut Peine
- Horst von Otto
- Otto Graf
- Herbert A.E. Böhme
- Eva Probst
- Günter Pfitzmann

== Bibliography ==
- Hans-Michael Bock and Tim Bergfelder. The Concise Cinegraph: An Encyclopedia of German Cinema. Berghahn Books, 2009.
