= Frank Richards (performer) =

American entertainer (1887–1969)

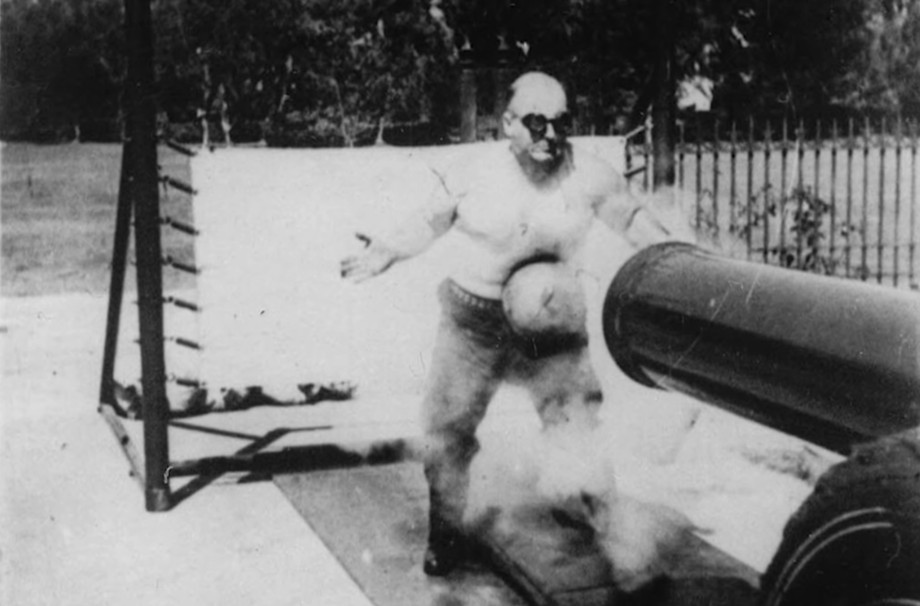
- Born: Frank Anson Richards; February 20, 1887; Minneapolis, Kansas, U.S.
- Died: February 7, 1969 (aged 81); Long Beach, California, U.S.
- Other names: Frank "Cannonball" Richards; Cannonball Richards
- Occupations: Entertainer; Vaudeville performer; Sideshow performer

Frank Anson Richards, also known as Frank "Cannonball" Richards and Cannonball Richards (February 20, 1887 – February 7, 1969), was an American carnival and vaudeville performer whose act involved taking heavy blows to his abdomen.

Richards began by letting people, including heavyweight boxing champion Jack Dempsey, punch him in the gut. Dempsey hit him in the abdomen a reported total of 75 times. He then progressed to letting people jump on his belly, being struck by a two-by-four, being struck by a sledgehammer, and finally being shot by a 104-lb. (47 kg) cannonball from a 12 foot (3.6m) compressed air cannon. Richards limited his cannonball act to twice per day, as performing it more often was too painful.

== Early life ==
Frank Anson Richards was born to Richard Jones Richards and Ellen Elizabeth Richards on February 20, 1887, in Minneapolis, Kansas. He had two siblings. Before he became a performer, Richards served in World War I.

== Career ==
Prior to 1924, Richards started in vaudeville with an act of exhibiting how strong his abdomen was. These included being hit in the solar plexus with a sledgehammer, battering rams and allowing people to jump on his abdomen. He also allowed champion boxer Jess Willard to punch him in the stomach.

Richards' most famous act involved him being shot in the abdomen with a cannonball weighing over one hundred pounds. He performed this act twice a day during the peak of his career.

== Personal life ==
Richards made Long Beach, California his permanent home, despite touring a lot for work. He was a Christian, a member of the Presbyterian Church of Pomona. Richards was a member of American Legion Post 27, and gave free shows at Legion meetings, Elks Clubs, and many military camps during World War II.

Because of his act being centered around getting hit in the gut, he became acquainted with most boxing champions of the time. These included Jim Jeffries, Jack Johnson, Ad Wolgast, Mexican Joe Rivers, Joe Louis, Jess Willard, and Jack Dempsey.

== Death ==
Richards died on February 7, 1969, in Long Beach, at the age of 81. He was buried at the Pomona Cemetery and Mausoleum in Pomona, California.

== In popular culture ==
A short clip of Richards performing his cannonball trick has become a well-known example of stock footage in popular culture.

In the Freakazoid! episode "The Chip: Part 1", the clip is shown as the character Roddy MacStew says that he has seen many strange things in his lifetime, which include a man being hit in the abdomen with a cannonball. It was also used in the 1977 documentary Gizmo!, The Fairly OddParents episode "Fairly OddBaby", and the Chuck episode "Chuck versus the Fear of Death", as well as being referenced in the Seinfeld episode "The Apology".

Richards's cannonball act was parodied in The Simpsons episode "Homerpalooza", where Homer Simpson becomes a carnival freak catching cannonballs, but quits after it is revealed it would kill him to keep going.

In TV series Futurama episode "The Problem with Popplers", archive footage of Richards's cannonball act appears in the big screen of the opening.

Other uses include a still image from the clip for the cover of the album Van Halen III and stuntman Preston Lacy reenacting the trick in the opening to Jackass 3D.

== See also ==
- "Homerpalooza", episode of The Simpsons where Homer portrays a version of Frank "Cannonball" Richards
- Human cannonball
