= University of Cambridge legends =

There are a number of popular legends associated with Cambridge University and its 800 year-old history, often recounted by punt guides to tourists while cruising the River Cam. Some are true, some contain elements of truth, and others are somewhat more fabricated. The myths and legends listed below represent a select few of the traditions and stories associated with Cambridge.

== Mathematical Bridge ==
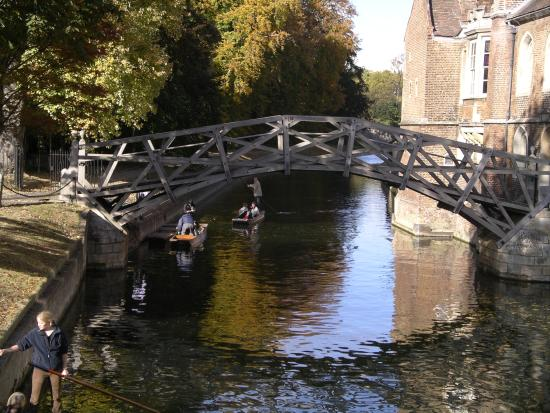
The Mathematical Bridge

One famous narrative relates to Queens' College's wooden footbridge known as the Mathematical Bridge. The story usually goes as follows: constructed by Sir Isaac Newton, it held itself together without any bolts or screws. Years later, inquisitive students took it apart in order to see how it fitted together and the deconstructers were unable to reassemble it without bolts. However the bridge was erected 22 years after Newton's death and always used pins and screws at the joints (although the current version of the bridge does use more visible nuts and bolts).

A variation on this tale has the bridge being dismantled by the college's Fellows due to the onset of World War II.

== Clare College Bridge ==
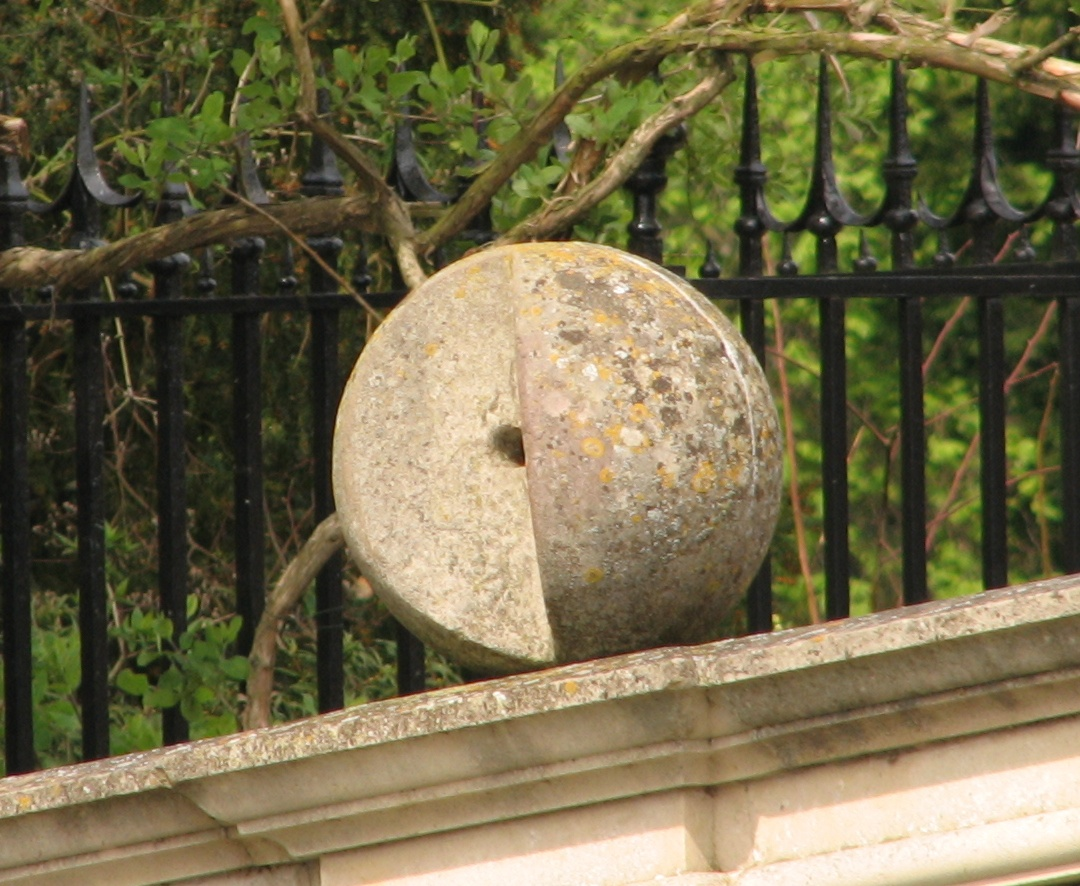
Clare Bridge's missing wedge

Other tales involve Clare College Bridge, built 1639–40 which is adorned with spherical stone ornaments. One of these has a quarter sphere wedge removed from the back, a feature pointed out on almost all tours over the bridge. Three tales explaining this are:

1. The bridge's builder was not paid in full due to the college's dissatisfaction with its construction. The builder thus took his revenge by committing a small act of petty vandalism.
2. A college fellow removed the quarter-sphere to ensure another fellow could not win a bet with him as to how many spheres there are on the bridge.
3. The sphere was deliberately incomplete so that Clare College could avoid paying a "bridge tax"; an unfinished bridge did not count.

In reality, the reason for the missing wedge is due to a weathered repair. As a result of corrosion of the sphere's fixing to the bridge, it became loose. It was removed, and a segment cut out to allow access to the fixing, set in place with cement, and the segment replaced. It was orientated with the cut facing outward so that it would be least noticeable to people crossing the bridge. Through subsequent weathering of the cement, the segment detached from the rest of the sphere, and presumably fell into the river. On close examination, it can be seen that a number of the other spheres have had similar repairs carried out, but their cut segments have remained attached.

== Bridge of Sighs ==
On two separate occasions, students have pulled the prank of dangling a car under the Bridge of Sighs at St John's. In the first incident (in 1963), a 1928 Austin Seven was punted down the river using four punts that had been lashed together then hoisted up under the bridge using ropes. The second incident (in 1968) involved a Reliant Regal (a three-wheeled car) being dangled under the bridge; it was cut down by the fire brigade in the morning. In neither case was the bridge damaged.

== The Night Climbers of Cambridge ==
The Night Climbers of Cambridge was a book written under the pseudonym "Whipplesnaith" about nocturnal climbing on the colleges and town buildings of Cambridge, England, in the 1930s. The book remains popular among students. It is often credited with popularising and inspiring the first generation of urban exploring and night climbing.

A new authorised edition of The Night Climbers of Cambridge (ISBN 978-1909349551) was published on 26 October 2007 by Oleander Press, Cambridge, to mark the 70th anniversary of the original edition. The new edition was updated and has proved popular among students and urban explorers.

== Car on the Senate House roof ==
The story of the Austin Seven delivery van that ended up on the apex of the Senate House is not fictitious. The Caius College website recounts how, on 8 June 1958, this vehicle really did go "up in the world". The prank team comprised Peter Davey (organiser), Cyril Pritchett, David Fowler and 9 others.

== Objects on King's College chapel ==
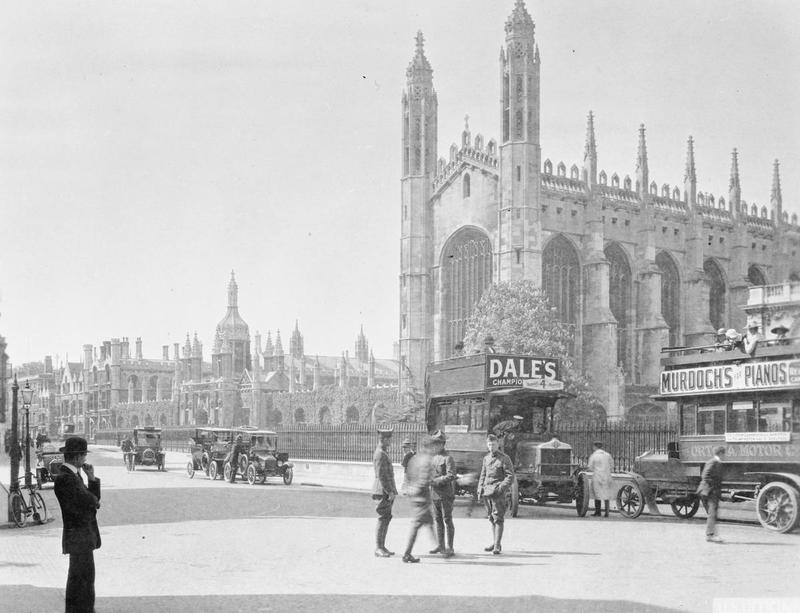
King's College Chapel

One story tells of a couple of students with a keen interest in climbing, who decided to scale the walls of King's College chapel after hours and place a roadcone (or similar object) atop one of the spires. On discovering the object the next morning, the college are said to have called in a building company to erect scaffolding in order to remove the offending object. However, the erection of the scaffolding could not be completed before dusk, and so the adventurous students ascended the chapel the next night and moved the roadcone to the opposite end of the chapel's roof, thus rendering the half-erect scaffolding useless. Parts of these attempts are described in The Night Climbers of Cambridge.

In 2002, a single toilet seat placed by a student on one of the spires remained there, eventually being retrieved by a steeplejack.

In late November 2009 Santa hats were placed on each of the four spires of the Chapel overnight. The College had these removed by a professional steeplejack at great expense.

== Trinity College's riches ==
As the wealthiest of all Oxbridge colleges, Trinity College is naturally the subject of many rumours and popular urban legends. The college is sometimes suggested to be the second, third or fourth wealthiest landowner in the UK (or in England) – after the Crown Estate, the National Trust and the Church of England. A variant of this legend is repeated in the Tom Sharpe novel Porterhouse Blue. In 2005, it was reported that the college takes in £20 million plus per year in rent from its properties. In comparison, the National Trust received about £42.6 million in rental income from its properties in 2005–2006.

A second legend is that it is possible to walk from Cambridge to Oxford solely on land owned by Trinity. Jeremy Fairbrother, the college's senior bursar in 2005, has said this belief is incorrect.
