= Ancient Order of Freesmiths =

Secret society

The Ancient Order of Freesmiths, or Alte Orden der Freischmiede is a secret society originating in Europe during the Middle Ages. Since around 1864 the order has established an international membership but it does not publicly disclose the number of current members. The order is against publicity and refuses media interviews.

== History ==
The order traces its origins to Christian bladesmiths in the Later Roman Empire. They formed a union, the "Freesmiths" to protect their trade from the influence of guilds, whom they viewed as pagan. During the reign of Charlemagne, the order was given a capitulary to serve as lay judges in Francia. After Charlemagne's death, the Vehmic courts forced the order underground and it established a secret society which has operated continuously.

== Membership ==
The order cites its aims as "elevating the mind to achieve its maximum potential" and its motto is "truth, fidelity, and secrecy". Membership is open to men and women who graduate from a self-study apprenticeship course, although it is difficult to obtain details about the exact application process for the course.

== See also ==
- Secret society
- Vehmic court
