= The Night Climbers of Cambridge =

1930s book

- Author: Whipplesnaith
- Publisher: Chatto and Windus
- Publication date: 1937

Senate House Passage, looking east towards Gonville and Caius College and the Senate House

The Night Climbers of Cambridge is a book, written under the pseudonym "Whipplesnaith", about nocturnal climbing on the colleges and town buildings of Cambridge, England, in the 1930s. The book remains popular among Cambridge University students and the 1930s and 1950s editions can be hard to find. It is often credited with popularising and inspiring the first generation of urban explorers and night climbers.

== History ==
After extensive research, it was revealed that "Whipplesnaith" is a pseudonym for Noël Howard Symington, who feared retribution for his work. Eric Waddams, a choral scholar at Kings, who either took or featured in most of the photographs, was a contributor. There was also a third unknown contributor.

The book was originally published in October 1937 by Chatto and Windus and proved popular. The book was revised in November 1937 and reprinted in 1952 and 1953, selling out each time. The second edition contains a reordered selection of photographs and a missing diagram explaining the escape from the roof of the Marks and Spencer, as well as other useful information on night climbing.

The book was sought after, especially in Cambridge itself where it was regarded as one of few "guidebooks" to the routes onto the roofs of the town's ancient buildings. Famous climbs documented in the book are the King's College and St John's College chapels and the "Senate House leap" across Senate House Passage between Gonville and Caius College and the Senate House. The Night Climbers of Cambridge is often credited with inspiring the next generation of urban explorers and spawned many University of Cambridge legends and traditions. Since its publication several climbs of King's College Chapel have been completed.

A new authorised edition was published on 26 October 2007 by Oleander Press, Cambridge, to mark the 70th anniversary of the original edition. The new edition includes images digitally remastered from the original negatives, and has proved popular among Oxbridge students and urban explorers.

== Similar projects ==
In addition to The Night Climbers of Cambridge, an omnibus edition of The Roof Climber's Guide to Trinity was published on 11 July 2011 by Oleander Press. Its introduction contains further details about Symington and his book. In addition it included not before seen information on night-climbing and urban exploring in Cambridge and the surrounding towns, villages and country houses. The Roof Climber's Guide to Trinity has remained popular, though it is easier to find in bookshops than the original Night Climbers.

Given its sometimes clandestine nature, some Cambridge students have described The Night Climbers of Cambridge as a modern day Marauder's Map of Harry Potter fame. In 2014, a team of Cambridge engineers designed an online app called the "Cambridge Marauders Map", which allowed friends to view their movements within the colleges of Cambridge and identify potential hazards. The Marauders Map app included many climbing and urban exploring features taken from The Night Climbers of Cambridge. The app is no longer publicly available.

== Legacy ==
Symington stood for Harborough in 1950 as an independent Mosleyite candidate, receiving 273 votes. In 1958 he published the book Return to Responsibility: A New Concept of the Case for Fascism in the Post-War World.

Eric Waddams was head of music at Elizabeth College, Guernsey in the 1950s and 1960s.

The Night Climbers of Cambridge is repeatedly referred to in The Bad Quarto, a mystery novel by Jill Paton Walsh. Her novel mentions a supposed additional chapter regarding night climbing in St Agatha's College, the fictional Cambridge setting for most of Walsh's stories about Imogen Quy, college nurse at St Agatha's. Night climbing plays a central role in The Bad Quarto, along with a production of the 1603 quarto version of Hamlet.

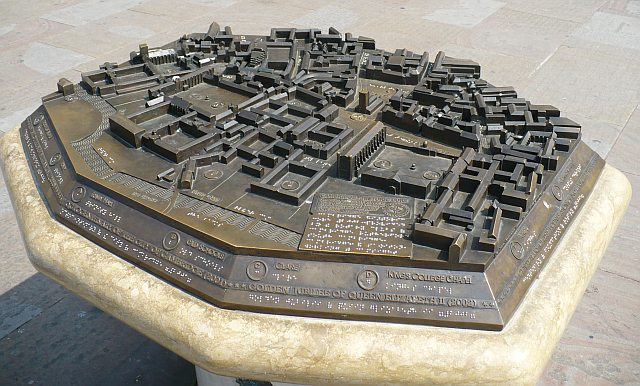
Cambridge Colleges (3D Map)

== See also ==
- Buildering
- Geoffrey Winthrop Young
- Ivo Stourton
- Nick Raynsford
- The Night Climbers of Oxford
