= Simo (society) =

Secret society in West Africa

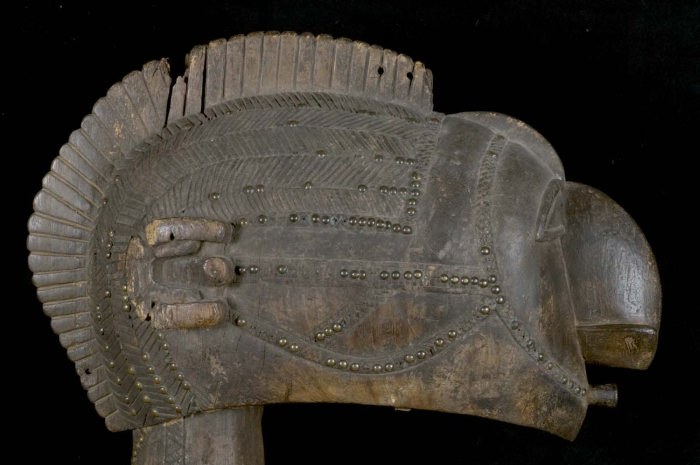
A mask of the goddess Nimba, a goddess of fertility celebrated in Simo society, collection of Tropenmuseum, Amsterdam.

The Simo society is a secret society in West Africa (esp. Ghana, Mali, Sierra Leone) also described as a "masked cult". It hails, according to a UNESCO report, from among either the Temne people or the Baga people at the time of the Mali Empire. The Susu people's political organization "assigned an important role to the Simo initiation society", and it "dominated" the organization of the Baga and the Landuma people.

Initiation and other rites included masks, and of particular importance were fertility rites. The Simo were also one of many secret "cultic groups" (whose priests "possessed immense knowledge of herbs and roots") that practiced medicine to cure specific ailments.

== Observations by early white ethnographers ==
French explorer René Caillié, the first European to travel to Timbuktu and return alive, described a group of young men living in the forest along the Nunez River after being initiated (through circumcision) by a man called the Simo, who is never seen by anyone except for his young companions who stay with him for seven or eight years. The Simo also acts as a chief magistrate to the locals; his place of residence in the forest is to be left in peace at all time and infractions have to be atoned for with gifts handed over in a ritual manner—with the giver keeping his back to the Simo.

According to a 1908 study by Hutton Webster, the Simo had degenerated from a "powerful organization devoted to the interests of the people" into little more than a group that organized dances and dressed up.

== Masks ==
Masks, decorated with "animal, reptile and human attributes" are used in ritual.

== See also ==
- Secret society
