= Rick Rojatt =

Canadian stuntman

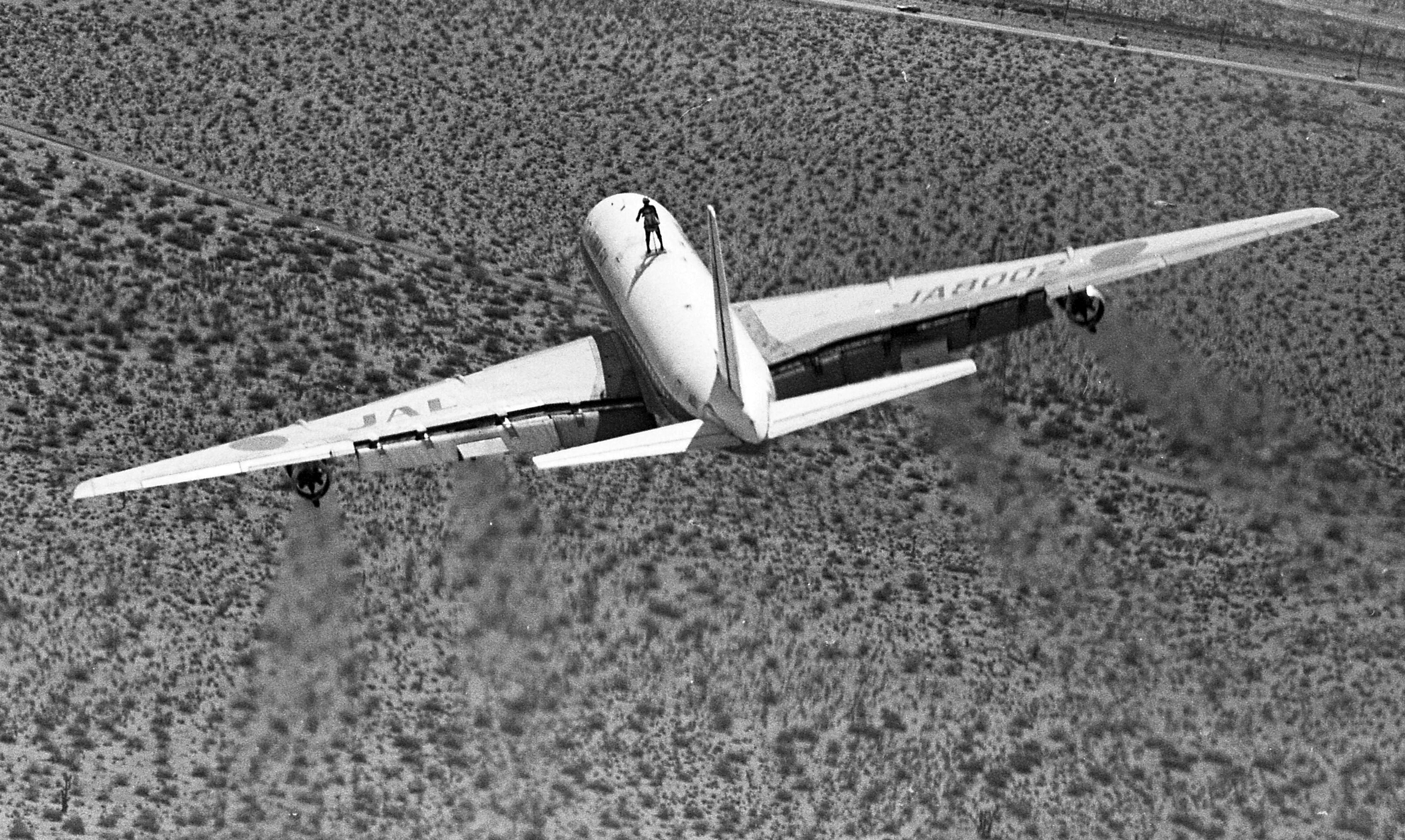
- Rojatt strapped to a DC-8, 1976

Rick Rojatt is a Canadian stuntman, and the inspiration for the Human Fly comic book character.

== Stunt career ==
Rojatt performed a 250 mph (400 km/h) wing-walking stunt on top of a DC-8 airliner (registration N420AJ, ex-Japan Air Lines registration JA8002) flown by Clay Lacy over the Mojave Desert and Texas, both in the United States.

In 1977, Rojatt contracted a hydrogen peroxide rocket-powered Harley-Davidson Sportster motorcycle to be built to jump 27 school buses at the Montreal Olympic Stadium during a Gloria Gaynor concert and beat Evel Knievel's record jump of 13 buses. Although he was able to beat the record, Rojatt crashed the motorcycle and suffered a broken ankle and some other injuries. He then retired from public life.

== Personal life ==
It is currently not known where exactly Rojatt lives. As of 2024, he is believed to be living in a nursing home in southwestern Ontario. Prior to that, he was known to be living in Fergus, Ontario.
