= "Steeplejack" Charles Miller =

American urban climber

- Born: 1882
- Died: 1910 (aged 27–28); Los Angeles
- Occupation: Stunt performer
- Years active: 1900-1910

Steeplejack Charles Miller (1882–1910), nicknamed the Human Fly, was an American man famous for climbing buildings. He began climbing in 1900, and earned a living from his stunts. Miller did not use any climbing equipment. He died after falling sixty feet from the fourth floor of the Hamburger building in Los Angeles in full view of hundreds of spectators, who transported his unconscious body to the hospital, where he later succumbed to his injuries.

== See also ==
- List of stunt performers nicknamed the "Human Fly"
- Buildering
