= The Night Climbers of Oxford =

Secret society in Oxford, England

The Night Climbers of Oxford is a secret society dedicated to nocturnally scaling college and town buildings in Oxford, England. The society is noted for its political activism, controversial acts, feats of climbing and parkour, as well as urban exploration. The society was likely inspired by its Cambridge counterparts, The Night Climbers of Cambridge. Activities conducted by the society are forbidden by the University authorities, meaning that acts are completed under the cover of darkness, to avoid detection.

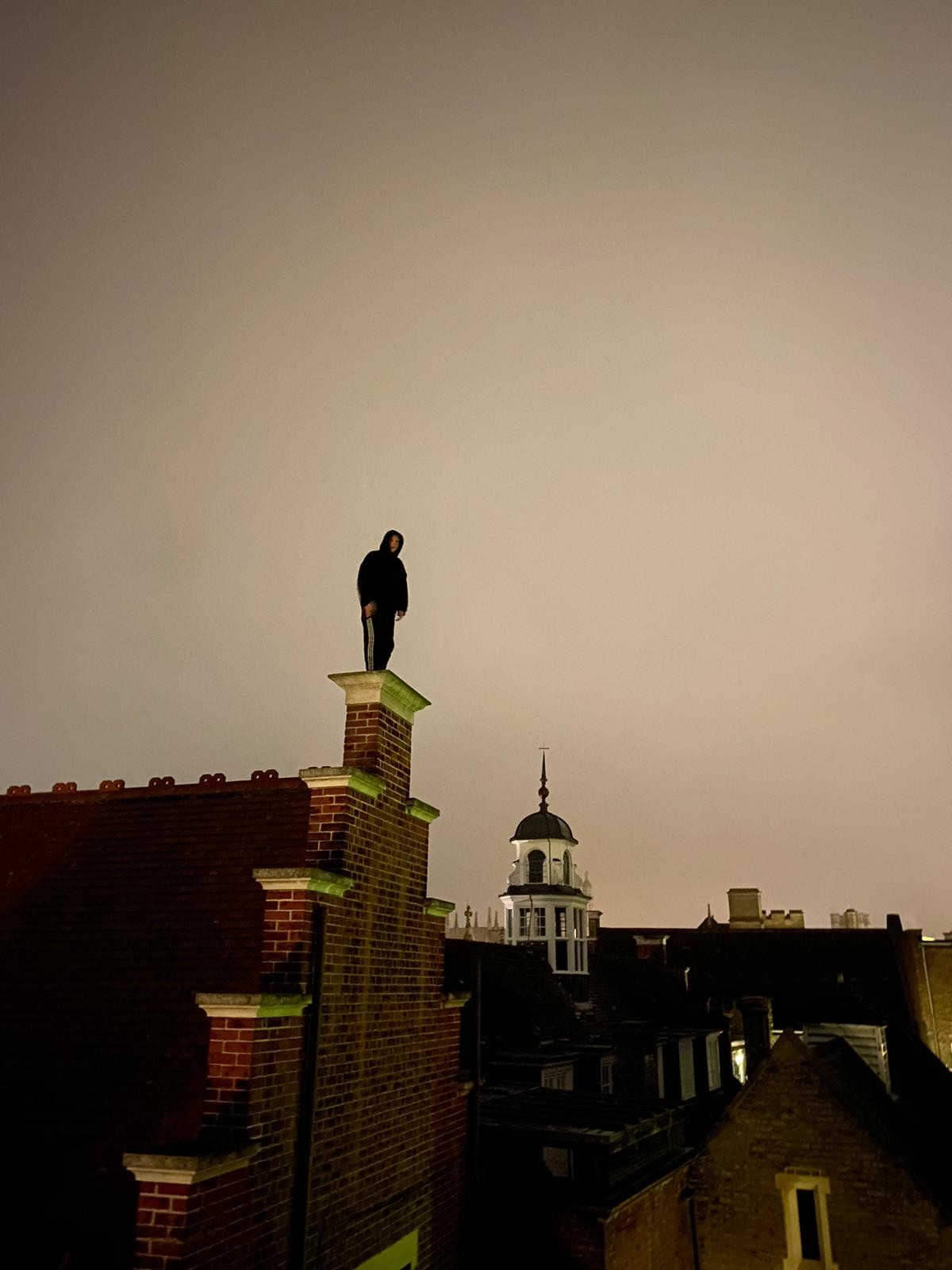
An image taken from the 'Night Climbers' Facebook page depicting an Oxford Night Climber standing on the 'Stepping Stones', a frequently visited Night Climbing route in Cambridge

== History ==
The founding date of the Night Climbing society remains unknown, although acts of nocturnal climbing in Oxford are reported to date back to the 1930s, with members of the Alpine Club and Oxford University Mountaineering Club being some of the first to venture on to the University rooftops. The historian and climber David Cox is widely suspected of being one of the society's founders. He is also regarded as one of the first night climbers to have scaled the Radcliffe Camera and the Codrington Library, during the early 1930s. Upon his second ascent of the Radcliffe Camera, he was accompanied by fellow climber Nully Kretschmer. As an undergraduate, Cox stole the weather vane from the Christopher Wren sundial in All Souls College. Upon being elected a fellow, he climbed back up and replaced it without its absence being noticed.

Whilst attending Queen's College, Robin Hodgkin was documented by British diplomat and climber Edward Peck, as he made the first ascent of the Radcliffe Camera. Peck would later go on to write that Hodgkin's formal and informal exploits as both a member of the OUMC and Night Climbing society, were "legendary". The crux of the climb - surmounting the overhang before the dome - was achieved by using a lightning conductor, which has since been removed by the authorities. Through their many joint ventures, Cox and Hodgkin became life-long friends.

Paul Wand and John Hoyland are also regarded as two prominent pioneers of the Night Climbing society. On one occasion, both Paul and John sought to remove the bronze elephant shaped weathervane from the roof of the Indian Institute on the corner of Holywell Street and Catte Street. This plan had initially been dreamt up with fellow member of the society, David Cox. After the initial failed attempt by David and John when they were nearly caught by a caretaker, David suffered an injury after an accident at Pontesford and couldn’t partake in another effort. John therefore called upon Paul to liberate the elephant with him, and the two of them ascended the rooftop in the early hours of the morning. Although they retrieved the elephant from the spike, they were caught yet again and were forced to escape by abseiling to safety below. Tragically, both climbers died upon the Innominata Ridge of Mont Blanc in 1934, leaving a permanent void in both the Night Climbing and Oxford University Mountaineering Club.

Tom Tower at Christ Church is also reported to have first been scaled in the 1940s by undergraduate students. Hamish Nicol, a mountaineer, participated in acts of night climbing. After completing his National Service from 1947–49, when he was commissioned in the Royal Artillery, he attended Balliol College, where he switched from Geology to Medicine. During his studies at Oxford, Nicol placed a white bow tie on top of the Radcliffe Camera to celebrate the Coronation of Elizabeth II.

Despite Oxford hosting similar architecture to that of Cambridge, night-climbing activities remained sporadic throughout the 1960s and 1970s. This was likely because of the combination of Oxford University Mountaineering Club senior members and Presidents discouraging acts of night climbing and the brickwork of Oxford supposedly being renowned for its fragility and softness, making climbs on listed or college buildings dangerous. For these reasons, no formal society dedicated to Night Climbing is thought to have gained any traction or structure during the late 20th century.

Whilst an undergraduate at St Catherine's College from 2005–2008, Katherine Rundell developed an interest in night climbing and began to explore the rooftops, inspired by the 1937 book The Night Climbers of Cambridge according to her diary. Rundell would later publish the book Rooftoppers, which followed the adventures of Sophie, a girl orphaned in a shipwreck on her first birthday. Sophie later attempts to find her mother, who she is convinced survived the disaster, whilst also taking to the rooftops of Paris in order to thwart officials trying to send her to a British orphanage.

The early 21st century has seen an increase in the number of night-climbing activities based in Oxford. From 2016 to 2020, a group of nocturnal climbers began posting images to anonymous confession Facebook pages such as Oxfess, detailing climbs conducted at The Radcliffe Camera, Christ Church, Corpus Christi College, Pembroke College, Westgate, Cornmarket Street, and several other high-profile locations. Each public post contained content of a political or philosophical nature, with advice given sometimes in the form of an 'agony aunt'. The local media dubbed the group "The Night Climbers of Oxford", for their identities remained unknown. Despite some backlash, the public showed support for the group and their controversial acts. As a result, they quickly became part of Oxford's urban and night-life culture. The modern incarnation is thought to be a mixed-gender society, unlike their Cambridge counterparts. It is not exclusive to members of Oxford University and consists of those who are physically talented in sports such as rock climbing and parkour.

== Political activism ==
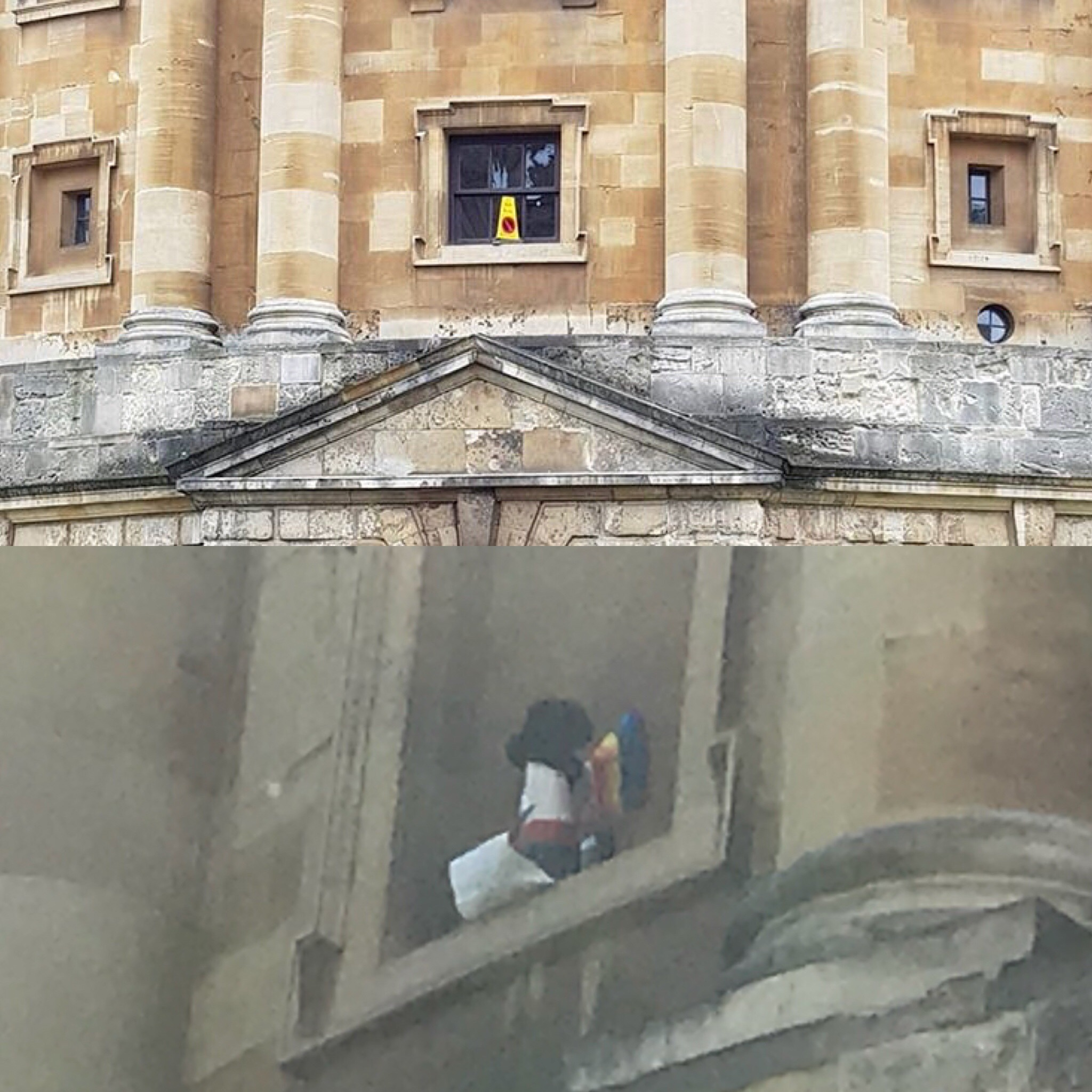
Traffic cones decorated with student memorabilia and LGBT Movement rainbow flags, on the exterior of the Radcliffe Camera

During May 2018, traffic cones began to litter the exterior walls of the Radcliffe Camera. The Night Climbers of Oxford claimed responsibility through anonymous Oxfess Facebook submissions. The cones were detailed with humorous content, supposedly designed to put students in a 'light-hearted' frame of mind. During Oxford's pride week the traffic cones were decorated with rainbow flags, showing the secret society's clear support for the movement. Other key political issues that are often pursued by the Night Climbers are that of inequality, elitism, and the homeless epidemic in Oxford.

== Trespassing and controversy ==
In April 2017, Merton Street was shut and fire tenders were called after several Corpus Christi College students climbed onto the roof, following a 'Bop'. All but one of the students escaped from the porters, while one had to be rescued by the fire service. Eyewitness reports indicate the students crawled along a first-floor gutter in order to reach the slate roof of the main Quad. It is unclear how the students reached the gutter, but they were quickly spotted by porters and a Junior Dean. Speaking to the Cherwell student newspaper, David Bray, Fire Protection and Business Safety Manager for Oxfordshire Fire and Rescue Service, released a statement saying: "They had placed themselves at great danger, considering that they were over four storeys above street level, and the slightest slip may have had disastrous consequences, which could have, at best, involved life-changing injuries."

In an email to JCR members, seen by Cherwell, the Dean of Corpus Christi, Dr David Russell, described climbing on college buildings as "extraordinarily dangerous", noting the "seriousness" of the ban on climbing and concluding that the ground was "unforgiving."

In January 2017, Christ Church students were issued with a safety warning after roof alarms were triggered by a night-climbing incident. The Night Climbers of Oxford confirmed to the Cherwell student newspaper that two of their members had scaled Christ Church within the same time frame, coinciding with the incident. Professor Geraldine Johnson, the college's junior censor, warned students to "make sure you don't let anyone use your windows to access either the scaffolding or roof areas of the College." The Night Climbers informed Cherwell that Christ Church was the easiest college to "both climb and infiltrate", because of the many obscure entrances on the grounds. College authorities expressed their concerns, highlighting the dangers of climbing on college buildings, despite not condemning the act of night climbing itself.

== Popular culture ==
In more recent years, guides, books, photographic projects, plays and films have depicted the night-climbing/roof-climbing culture within Oxford. They are as follows:

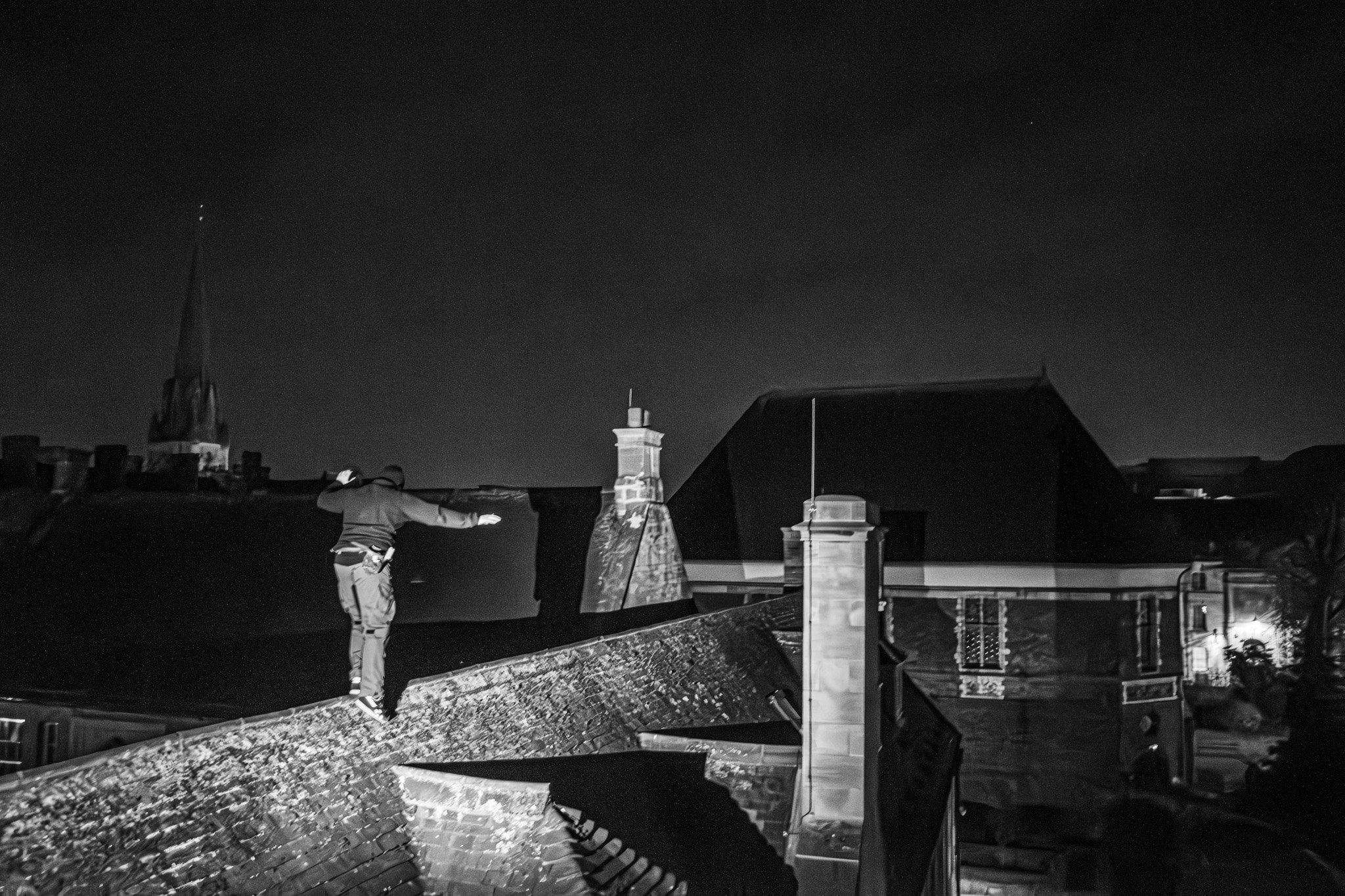
An Oxford night climber walks along the ridge of a rooftop. Photograph from The Night Climbers of Oxford by photographer Austin Bradley.

In 2024/5, The Night Climbers of Oxford, a photobook by adventure sports photographer Austin Bradley, became the first documentary project to visually record the ongoing practice of night climbing in Oxford. Made over several months with the cooperation of active climbers, the work captures moments of movement, risk, and stillness across the city’s rooftops. Combining photography, short stories and archival material, the book reflects on the long standing tradition of urban exploration in the city, and the ways it continues to evolve. The project is rooted in direct involvement with the scene, continuing the participatory approach seen in earlier works such as John Bulmer's Night Climbers of Cambridge. The photobook is due to be published in 2025 and made available for public distribution. As of now, only a single copy exists in print, created as part of the project's early development and exhibition process.

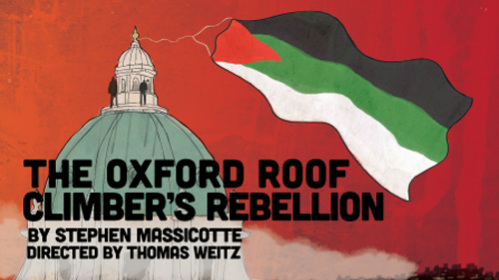
The Oxford Roof Climber's Rebellion, by Stephen Massicotte and R. H. Thomson

In 2007, Stephen Massicotte and R. H. Thomson printed the book The Oxford Roof Climber's Rebellion. This book inventively expands on the friendship between T. E. Lawrence and Robert Graves, suffering from the aftermath of World War I and foreseeing the dawning of new ones. This prompts the Oxford Night Climbers to lay siege to the university and town buildings, placing an Arabian flag on a roof at Oxford. The film was later converted into a theatrical production, produced by the Urban Stages company.

In 2014, The Riot Club depicts students scaling the town buildings surrounding the High Street. Directed by Lone Scherfig and written by Laura Wade, the film is set amongst the privileged elite of Oxford University, following the story of Miles (Max Irons) and Alistair (Sam Claflin), two first-year students determined to join the infamous Riot Club. The Riot Club is described as a veiled version of the real-life Bullingdon Club.

== See also ==
- Parkour
- Freerunning
- Buildering
- Traditional climbing
- The Night Climbers of Cambridge
- Dérive
