= Human Fly (character) =

The Human Fly is the name of three characters appearing in American comic books published by Marvel Comics. One is a supervillain that was an occasional antagonist of Spider-Man, and the other two were superheroes, one of which was the title of a short-lived series in the late 1950s reprinting some of Fox's Blue Beetle strips from the 1940s. It was published by Super Comics.

== Publication history ==
The Human Fly first appeared in The Amazing Spider-Man Annual #10 (January 1976), and was created by Len Wein, Bill Mantlo, and Gil Kane. The character subsequently appears in The Amazing Spider-Man #192–193 (May–June 1979), Spider-Woman #30 (September 1980), Moon Knight #35 (January 1984), Peter Parker, the Spectacular Spider-Man #86 (January 1984), and The Amazing Spider-Man #276 (May 1986), in which he was killed by the Scourge of the Underworld. The story of the Fly in Peter Parker, the Spectacular Spider-Man #86 was drawn by Fred Hembeck, who (in his personal caricature form) had a guest appearance in that particular issue. The Fly received an entry in the original The Official Handbook of the Marvel Universe #4, and The Official Handbook of the Marvel Universe: Spider-Man #1 (2005).

The superhero version of Human Fly starred in Marvel Comics' The Human Fly #1–19 (September 1977 – March 1979). In July, 2024, a new series was released by IPI Comics.

== Fictional character biography ==
=== Richard Deacon ===
Human Fly
- Cover to The Amazing Spider-Man Annual #10, (January 1976). Pencils by Gil Kane, inks by John Romita.

Publication information
- Publisher: Marvel Comics
- First appearance: The Amazing Spider-Man Annual #10 (January 1976)
- Created by: Len Wein (writer); Bill Mantlo (writer); Gil Kane (artist)

In-story information
- Alter ego: Richard Deacon
- Species: Human mutate
- Team affiliations: Savage Six; Sinister Sixteen
- Notable aliases: Fly
- Abilities: Superhuman strength, stamina, durability, agility, and reflexes; Flight; Wall-crawling; 360° vision; Post-resurrection: Razor-sharp wings; Acidic vomit

Richard Deacon, born in Newark, New Jersey, was a small-time criminal who was shot by the police and left for dead after an unsuccessful kidnapping attempt which was foiled by Spider-Man. Stumbling into the laboratory of Dr. Harlan Stillwell (whose brother Farley Stillwell created the Scorpion for J. Jonah Jameson), Deacon coerces the scientist into saving his life. Overhearing an offer Jameson made with Stillwell to fund the creation of a new superhero, Deacon insists he be the subject of the experiment. Stillwell imprints the genetic coding of a housefly onto Deacon, empowering him and healing him of his bullet wounds. Deacon then kills Harlan Stillwell after he served his purpose and uses his newfound powers to further his criminal ambitions. He first uses Jameson as bait to get revenge on Spider-Man. Due to his inexperience, the Fly is no match for him and is defeated.

Some time later, Human Fly begins to display fly-like tendencies like eating garbage. He also develops physical mutations, including compound eyes. Human Fly attacks Spider-Man after Spencer Smythe handcuffs Spider-Man and J. Jonah Jameson to a bomb. Human Fly hurls the two from a rooftop and leaves them for dead. Once freed from the shackle, Spider-Man tries to stop Human Fly from stealing an art exhibit, but the villain knocks him down and escapes. Soon afterwards, the police catch the Fly using S.H.I.E.L.D. equipment.

Traveling to Los Angeles, the Fly seeks out Dr. Karl Malus, who confirms that his powers are fading and he will soon be powerless. Malus recommends that he get a new set of powers using a blood transfusion from another superbeing, which would most conveniently be the locally operating Spider-Woman. With his powers already at less than a third their usual strength however, he is unable to defeat her and is apprehended. Malus uses some of Human Fly's DNA to temporarily mutate Scotty McDowell into the similarly powered Hornet.

Human Fly is freed from prison and his powers restored by untold means. He subsequently battles Moon Knight, leaving the hero temporarily paralyzed, and again seeks revenge against Jameson and Spider-Man.

Over time, Deacon's mutation increases. After escaping from a mental institution, Deacon is killed by the Scourge of the Underworld while trying to take revenge on Spider-Man.

During the "Dark Reign" storyline, the Hood resurrects the Human Fly and seventeen other victims of the Scourge of the Underworld using the power of Dormammu and recruits them to eliminate the Punisher. The Fly now possesses acidic vomit and powerful wings, and demonstrates cannibalistic behavior.

Human Fly is later recruited by the third Crime Master to become a member of his Savage Six. He is then hired by Boomerang and Owl to become a member of the Sinister Sixteen.

=== Human Fly (superhero) ===
Human Fly
- Cover to issue #1 of The Human Fly, Sept. 1977. Art by Al Milgrom.

Publication information
- Publisher: Marvel Comics
- First appearance: The Human Fly #1 (September 1977)
- Created by: Bill Mantlo

In-story information
- Species: Human
- Abilities: Augmented durability; Equipment usage

The second Human Fly is a young man of unknown identity who was severely injured during a car crash. After a long hospitalization, including a number of reconstructive surgeries in which much of his skeleton was replaced by steel, he took on the masked identity of the Human Fly. As the Human Fly, he performed daredevil stunts to benefit various charities, especially those helping children with disabilities.

His activities often drew him into conflict with criminals, who were often seeking to rob the charity events at which he performed. Additionally, he drew the attention of Spider-Man, who thought he might be the villain of the same name.

The character was based on real-life stuntman Rick Rojatt. The comic book carried the tag line "The Wildest Super-Hero Ever – Because He's Real!", and photographs of Rojatt in a Human Fly costume appeared in the books.

== Powers and abilities ==
The Richard Deacon version of Human Fly has inhuman physical attributes, winged flight, and surface scaling. His compound eyes enable him to see in all directions at once. By vibrating his wings, he can create powerful shockwaves with concussive force. Following his revival at the Hood's hands, Deacon is able to vomit acid capable of dissolving flesh or metal, as well as sharp wings. He possesses a healing factor that enables him to regenerate his wings if they are severed.

The superhero version of Human Fly had his bone structure replaced by 60% steel, which allows him to withstand any injury that normal humans cannot. He is a master aerialist, unarmed combatant, and stuntman. The Human Fly utilizes a variety of specialized gadgets that helps him in his performances, depending on the stunt.

== Reception ==
- In 2020, CBR.com ranked Human Fly 9th in their "Spider-Man: 10 Weirdest Animal Villains From The Comics That We'd Like To See In The MCU" list.

== In other media ==
=== Television ===
- An original incarnation of the Human Fly, Dr. Hagel, appears in the Spider-Woman episode "Spider-Woman and the Fly", voiced by Lou Krugman. This version is a scientist and former assistant to Spider-Woman's father, Alex Drew, who was mutated in a lab accident. Hagel manages to deduce Spider-Woman's secret identity, but forgets it after being returned to normal.
- An unidentified Human Fly makes a non-speaking cameo appearance on the Spider-Man and His Amazing Friends episode "Attack of the Arachnoid".

=== Video games ===
The Richard Deacon incarnation of Human Fly appears as a playable character in Lego Marvel Super Heroes 2 via the Marvel's Ant-Man and the Wasp DLC pack.
