= John Ciampa =

Italian-American acrobatic stuntman and entertainer

John Ciampa (1922–1970) was an Italian-American acrobatic stuntman and entertainer known by the stage names of the Human Fly, the Flying Phantom and the Brooklyn Tarzan.

As a child, Ciampa had been fascinated by the acrobatic agility of film stars such as Errol Flynn and Douglas Fairbanks Sr. and by the character of Tarzan of the Apes as portrayed by Elmo Lincoln and later Johnny Weissmuller. Inspired by his screen heroes, Ciampa began to climb trees and buildings in his Brooklyn neighborhood at a young age, persisting with the activity into his teenage years and early adulthood.

== Career in the entertainment business ==
By 1942 Ciampa's unusual hobby had gained him some local notoriety. Coincident with the release of the feature film Tarzan's New York Adventure, Ciampa was featured in a Paramount Pictures newsreel exhibiting some of his feats of acrobatic buildering and freestyle tree climbing.

A bricklayer by profession, Ciampa also worked in the entertainment business throughout the late 1940s and early 1950s, starring in Larry Sunbrock's Rodeo and Thrill Circus in New York City and then traveling with the circus to various U.S. and Canadian cities. Notably, his act did not include the typical, tightly choreographed feats of circus acrobatics such as trapeze swinging or trampolining, but rather improvised climbing and leaping stunts making use of scaffolding and circus rigging. Spectators were frequently alarmed by the apparently ad libbed and obviously dangerous nature of his performances. In 1947 Ciampa was arrested for having scaled the exterior of the Astor Hotel as a publicity stunt for the Sunbrock Circus, concerning onlookers who feared that he might have been attempting suicide.

In 1950 Ciampa performed in the Olsen and Johnson comedy show "Pardon Our French", in which he startled theater audiences by leaping between boxes and running along balcony railings high above the stage, occasionally while costumed as a gorilla and billed as "Ciampa, the Swinging Ape". When the show toured to Boston, Ciampa's antics ran foul of local safety ordinances and he was required to reduce the height at which he performed his stunts.

== Appearance in Gizmo! documentary ==
The 1977 documentary film Gizmo! included footage from the Paramount newsreel of John Ciampa's climbing and jumping stunts, but did not credit Ciampa and ran the footage together with unrelated film of the also uncredited German stuntman Arnim Dahl, causing some confusion as to their identities.

In the Gizmo! sequence, Ciampa is first seen eating a spaghetti dinner with his family before running outside, acrobatically climbing a tree, leaping between buildings, running up a wall, quickly scaling a tall drainpipe, climbing a narrow alleyway by pressing his hands and feet against opposite walls and then repeating the latter feat with a young boy riding on his back, before waving to the camera from a rooftop.

Arnim Dahl is then seen jumping on board a tram, and Dahl is featured for the remainder of the sequence.
