= Ivo Stourton =

British author and solicitor (born 1982)

Ivo James Benedict Stourton (born 1982) is a British author and solicitor.

== Career ==
Stourton first came into the public eye at the age of 17 when he wrote and starred in Kassandra, an award-winning Edinburgh Festival production about the Vietnam War.

In June 2006 he was signed to a two-book deal by Random House. His first book, The Night Climbers a novel about a secret society in Cambridge and a group of friends who get involved in art fraud, was published on 4 June 2007, and is partly based on the infamous student practice of "night climbing". The Night Climbers was published in the United States by Simon Spotlight Entertainment on 7 September 2007.

His second novel, The Book Lover's Tale, was published in June 2011. His third, The Happier Dead, was published in 2014.

== Personal life ==
Stourton, who is the eldest child of Edward Stourton (1957–2026) and his first wife, Margaret (née McEwen), attended Eton College and was a member of the Eton Society alongside Prince William and actor Eddie Redmayne. He graduated with a double first in English from Corpus Christi College, Cambridge. His younger brother Tom also attended Eton and is a comedian.

Stourton entered the BPP Law School and is an associate at Slaughter and May.

== Bibliography ==
- Stourton, Ivo (2007). The Night Climbers. London: Doubleday. According to WorldCat, the book is held in 725 libraries, and has been translated into German, Dutch, and Russian.
- Stourton, Ivo (2011). The Book Lover's Tale. London: Doubleday. ISBN 0-385-61156-0. According to WorldCat, the book is held in 217 libraries
- Stourton, Ivo (2014). The Happier Dead Oxford, UK: Solaris. According to WorldCat, the book is held in 112 libraries
