= Buildering =

Act of climbing buildings and man-made structures

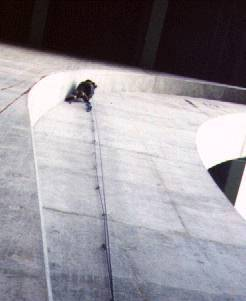
A climber ascends the Doran Memorial Bridge using aid climbing techniques

Buildering (also known as edificeering, urban climbing, structuring, skywalking, boulding, or stegophily) describes the act of climbing on the outside of buildings and other artificial structures. If done without ropes or protection far off the ground, buildering is extremely dangerous. It is often practised outside legal bounds, and is thus practised mostly at night.

Night climbing is a particular branch of buildering which has been practised for many years in a variety of locations, especially at the Universities of Oxford and Cambridge. Night climbing, as distinct from buildering, is performed mainly by undergraduates under cover of darkness. The term "night climbing" has replaced the older term "roof climbing". The philosophy behind night climbing has undergone great change during the 21st century, with urban disciplines such as parkour having a heavy influence on the evolution of night climbing techniques and movements.

Practitioners of buildering who climb buildings without authorization are regularly confronted by police after completing their exploits. Spectacular acts, such as free soloing skyscrapers, are usually undertaken by lone, experienced climbers and sometimes draw large crowds of onlookers and media attention. Such feats, however, remain relatively rare.

Buildering can also take a form more akin to bouldering, which tends towards ascending or traversing shorter sections of buildings and structures. While still generally frowned upon by property owners, some, such as the University of Colorado at Boulder and Tufts University, turn a blind eye towards the practice in many locations.

Although often practised as a solo sport, buildering has also become a popular group activity. As in more traditional rock climbing, routes are established and graded for difficulty.

== History ==
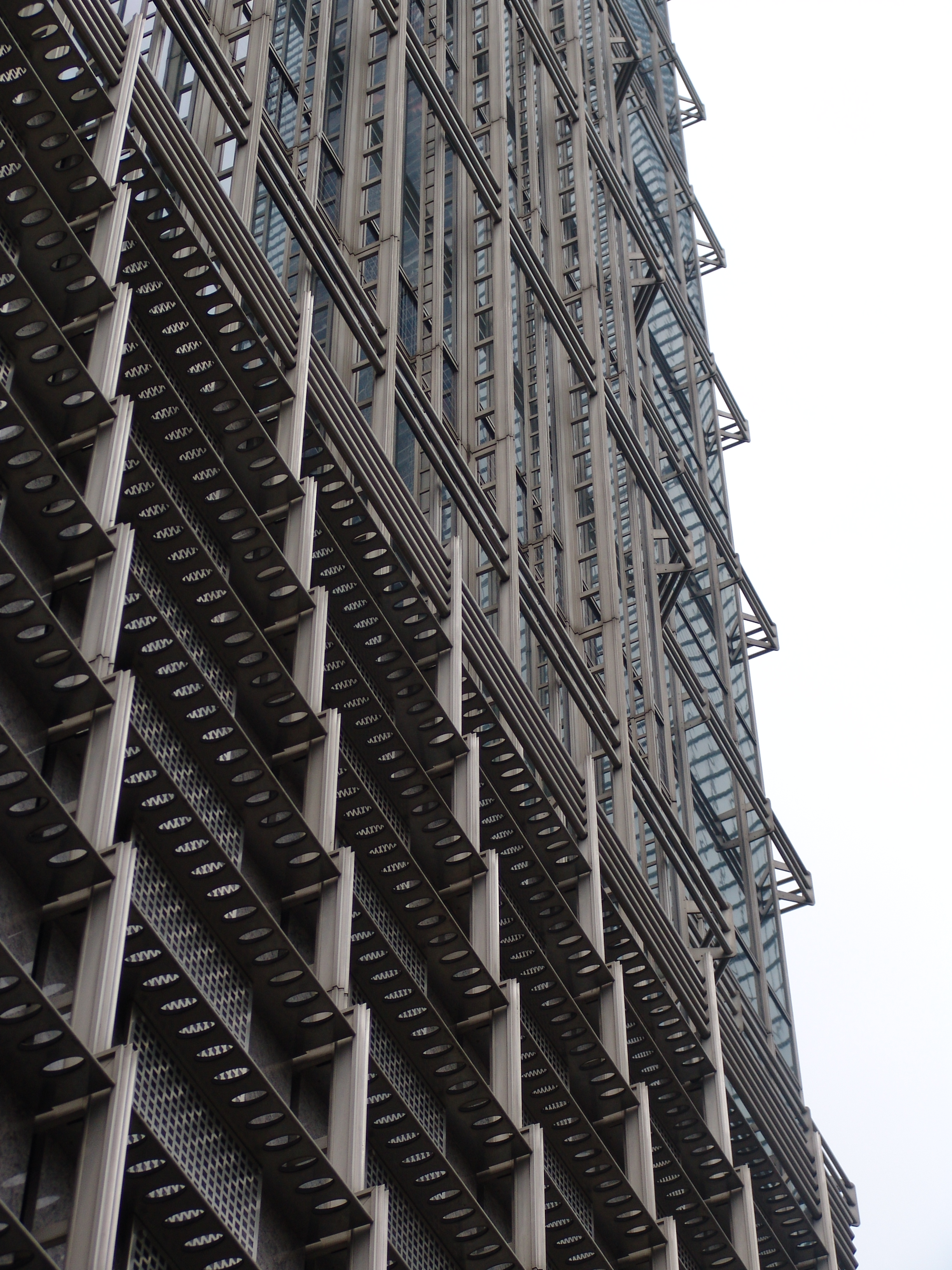
"Struck with a rash impulse," Han Qizhi, a 31-year-old shoe salesman, climbed the 88-story Jin Mao Building barehanded.

In 1895, Geoffrey Winthrop Young started to climb the roofs of Cambridge University. Students had been scrambling up the university architecture for years, but Young was the first to document this activity. He wrote and published a buildering guide to Trinity College. Then in 1905, while a master at Eton College, Young produced another small volume on buildering, spoofing mountaineering.

In 1905, Harry H. Gardiner began buildering. He successfully climbed over 700 buildings in Europe and North America, usually wearing ordinary street clothes and using no special equipment.

In 1910, George Polley started his climbing career when the owner of a clothing store promised him a suit if he would climb to the roof of the building. He succeeded, and went on to climb over 2,000 buildings.

During the years from 1915 to 1920, buildering in New York City reached its peak. Before 1915, there were few skyscrapers in New York City, and after 1920, the city authorities had legislated to outlaw buildering. During this era, a number of daredevils climbed the tall buildings, but several of them fell to their deaths in the attempt.

In 1921, a group of undergraduates from St John's College, Cambridge, published a buildering guide to that college.

In 1930, John Hurst wrote the second edition of Geoffrey Winthrop Young's buildering guide to Trinity.

In 1937, a comprehensive and lighthearted account of Cambridge night climbing (undergraduate buildering) appeared in popular print, written by Noël Howard Symington, under the pseudonym "Whipplesnaith".

In 1947, John Ciampa scaled the exterior of the Astor Hotel in New York City.

In 1960, Richard Williams wrote the third edition of the Trinity buildering guide. Night climbing remained popular in Cambridge during these post-war years. In 1970, a book entitled "Night Climbing in Cambridge" was published under the pseudonym "Hederatus". Buildering also featured prominently in a book by F A Reeve, published in 1977.

In 1977, George Willig climbed the South Tower of the World Trade Center.

In the 1980s, Dan Goodwin scaled many of the world's tallest buildings, including the World Trade Center, the Sears Tower, the John Hancock Center, the CN Tower, and the Telephonica Building in Santiago, for Stan Lee's Superhumans

In the 1990s and the following decade, Alain Robert became the world's most famous builderer by free soloing high buildings all over the globe.

In 2007, buildering in Cambridge was featured in a detective novel by Jill Paton Walsh.

Between 2007 and 2011, several books on night climbing were published by Oleander Press, of Cambridge. In 2007, they reprinted the Whipplesnaith book. In 2009, they reprinted Geoffrey Winthrop Young's first edition of the Trinity Guide, and the St John's Guide. In 2010, they reprinted John Hurst's second edition of the Trinity Guide, as well as Young's book "Wall and Roof Climbing". In 2011, they published an omnibus edition of the three Trinity guides, including an introduction by Richard Williams which reviewed the history of night climbing in Cambridge from the 18th century to the present day. This introduction removed the cloak of anonymity that had previously protected the identities of the first nocturnal explorers.

From around 2008, buildering (also known as "roofing") became popular among teenagers and young adults in Eastern European countries including Russia and Ukraine. They (e.g., Mustang Wanted) shared footage of their achievements on video portals such as YouTube.

In 2013, the History Press published a book by John Engle on the history of student pranks at Trinity College Dublin, which featured a full chapter on the university's long-standing night climbing tradition, including the buildering activities of the Dublin University Climbing Club.

In August 2016, a young man going by the name Stephen Rogata attempted to scale New York City's 68-story Trump Tower using climbing gear and giant suction cups; NYPD officers apprehended him at the 21st floor.

In April 2025, Jordan Schultz, a building climber and UC Berkeley graduate, published Campusing: A Secret History and Buildering Guide to UC Berkeley. The book presents possibly the most comprehensive history of buildering, as well as a current guidebook to buildering on UC Berkeley campus.

In January 2026, Alex Honnold free solo climbed the Taipei 101 tower in Taipei, the tallest buildering free solo climb in history.

== Notable builderers ==
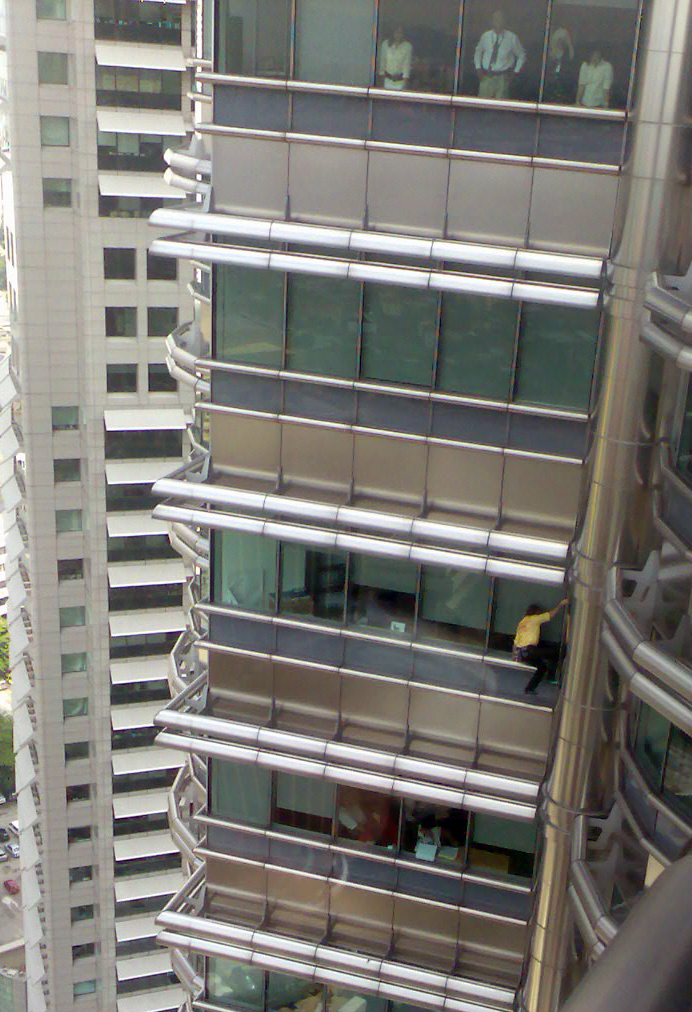
Alain Robert climbing Petronas Tower 2 in March 2007. On this occasion, he was arrested at the 60th floor.

Alain Robert, popularly known as "the French Spider-Man" and the "Human Spider", has achieved worldwide renown and is widely regarded as the greatest of all builderers. In 2011, he climbed the world's tallest building, the 830-meter Burj Khalifa tower in Dubai. On that occasion, he used a harness in accordance with safety procedures, but most of his climbs have been free soloing. Other well-known structures that Robert has climbed include the Empire State Building in New York City, the Golden Gate Bridge in San Francisco, the Sears Tower in Chicago, the Jin Mao Tower in Shanghai, The Doha Torch in Doha, Taipei 101 in Taiwan, and each of the Petronas Towers in Kuala Lumpur. He has also climbed a number of famous landmarks, including the Eiffel Tower and the Montparnasse Tower, and the Sydney Opera House. Robert has been arrested at the top of many of the major buildings he has climbed.

In the 1980s, Dan Goodwin, also known as "SpiderDan" and "Skyscraperman", in advocacy for high-rise firefighting and rescue, scaled many of the world's tallest buildings and structures including the Sears Tower, the John Hancock Center, the North Tower of the World Trade Center, the Parque Central Complex in Caracas, and the CN Tower in Toronto. In 2010, Goodwin scaled San Francisco, California's sixty-story Millennium Tower to call attention to the fire department's inability to conduct rescue operations in the upper floors of skyscrapers.

At least seven builderers became known as "The Human Fly", all from the United States, as follows:

- George Willig, who climbed the South Tower of the World Trade Center in 1977. Like Alain Robert, he was also known as "Spider-Man", after the comic hero who was first published by Marvel in 1962.
- John Ciampa, who climbed between 1942 and 1952. He was a stuntman and entertainer, and was also known as the "Flying Phantom" and the "Brooklyn Tarzan".
- James A. Dearing, who scaled the Rutherford County Courthouse in 1923, but fell to his death after completing the climb. His stage name was Roy Royce.
- Harry F. Young, who was hired in 1923 to climb the Hotel Martinique in New York City, to promote the silent movie Safety Last! He lost his grip on the ascent, and fell nine stories to his death.
- George Polley, who climbed between 1910 and 1920. He died at the age of 29 from a brain tumor.
- Harry Gardiner, who climbed over 700 buildings in Europe and the United States between 1905 and 1918, usually wearing street clothes and tennis shoes, with no climbing equipment.
- James Lotito, in 2020 is the most recent builderer to be dubbed "human fly". He has scaled many buildings and structures unaided, but is most known for an unsuccessful attempt in Manhattan.

In the 1930s, Whipplesnaith, Noël Symington, climbed many buildings in Cambridge.

On January 2026, in a live event for Netflix, Alex Honnold free soloed Taipei 101, the tallest building in Taiwan; at 508 metres (1,667 ft), it is the tallest building free solo climb in history.

== In media ==
Notable examples of buildering have featured in several types of media, including:

- In film: Safety Last!, Doorways in the Sand, Mission: Impossible – Ghost Protocol
- In video games: Assassin's Creed, Mirror's Edge, Uncharted

== See also ==
- Rooftopping
- Roof and tunnel hacking
- BASE jumping
- Urban exploration
- Night climbing
- Parkour
- The Night Climbers of Oxford
- The Night Climbers of Cambridge
