= Arnim Dahl =

German Stuntman

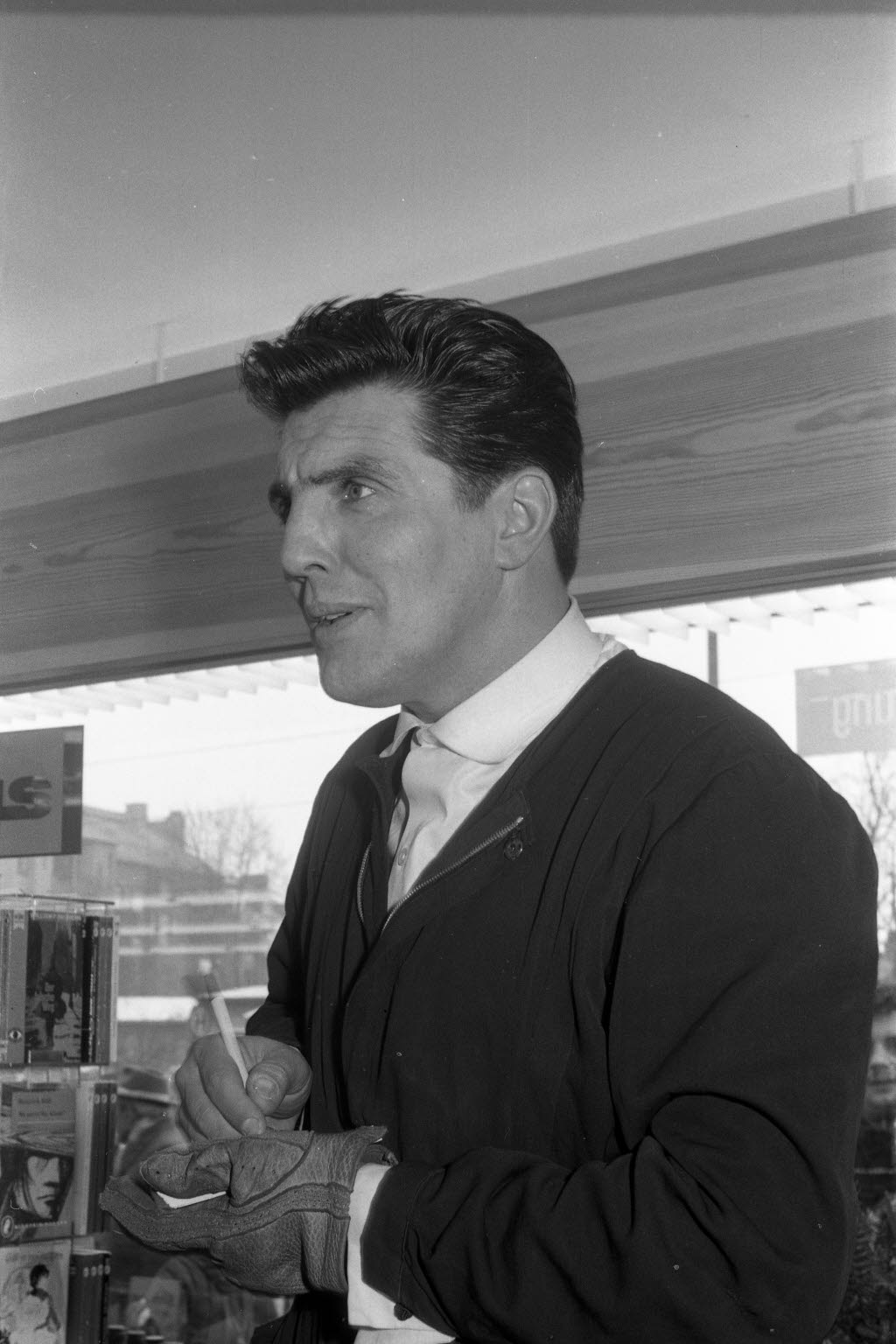
- Born: March 12, 1922; Stettin, Weimar Republic
- Died: August 3, 1998 (aged 76); Wedel, Germany
- Occupation: Stuntman

Arnim Dahl (March 12, 1922, in Stettin – August 3, 1998, in Wedel) was a German Stuntman.

== Life ==
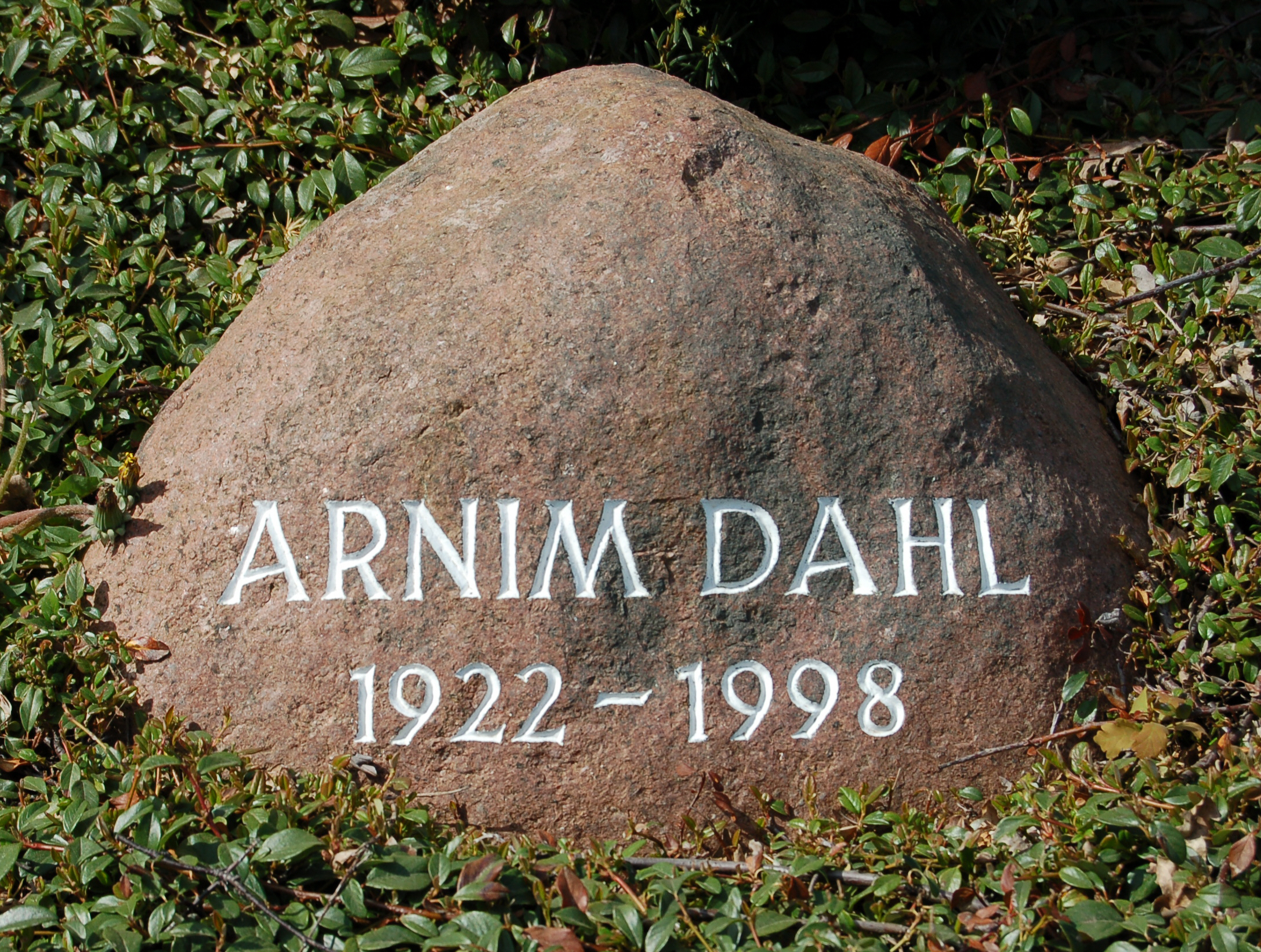
The gravestone of Arnim Dahl in Holm

His father Hermann Dahl was a former German champion in springboard diving. Following in his father's footsteps, Dahl was the 1938 German youth champion in springboard diving. Dahl was a bricklayer and carpenter before his service in World War II. After his military service, Dahl returned to Hamburg in 1946, and performed as a clown and circus artist. He already showed talent in tightrope walking, which would later make him famous. Starting in 1949, he became a stuntman. In 1952 he was hired by German director Kurt Hoffmann for the comedy Klettermaxe (translated “Climber”), where Dahl would be the stunt double for the film's lead actor Albert Lieven. Dahl became the first German stuntman in the postwar era. He was featured in about 40 productions, playing the stunt double for actors like Heinz Rühmann, Curd Jürgens and Kirk Douglas.

In 1959, Dahl found international attention when he walked the railing on the roof of the Empire State Building in New York City, finishing with a handstand. He received the same amount of attention when he jumped from the 47 m (154 ft) crane in the Harbor of Wilhelmshaven, during which he broke his spine and spent the following year in the hospital. During his time as a stuntman, Dahl suffered more than 100 bones fractures, and spent a total of 4 years of his life in the hospital.

For a short time in the 1960s, Dahl worked as a host of multiple children and youth television programs. In 1992, at the age of 70, Dahl retired into his private life. Dahl died on August 3, 1998, as a result of cancer. He is buried at the city cemetery in Holm, Germany.

== Selected filmography ==
- Only One Night (1950)
- The Shadow of Herr Monitor (1950)
- The Girl from the South Seas (1950)
- Klettermaxe (1952)
- Wenn der Vater mit dem Sohne (1952)
- Two Bavarians in the Harem (1957), as Toni
- Der Schinderhannes (1958), as Roter Fink
- Wegen Reichtums geschlossen (1968)

== Literature ==
- Herbert G. Hegedo: Arnim Dahl genannt Klettermaxe, Balve: Engelbert-Verlag, 1964.
- Eckhard Wendt: Stettiner Lebensbilder. Veröffentlichungen der Historischen Kommission für Pommern, Reihe V, Band 40. Böhlau Verlag, Köln Weimar Wien 2004, ISBN 3-412-09404-8, S. 118–119.
- "Dahl lebt gefährlich". SPIEGEL. January 7, 1953.
