= George Polley =

American urban climber

George Gibson Polley (1898–1927) was an American pioneer of (the then-unnamed act of) buildering, or climbing the walls of tall buildings, earning him the nickname "the human fly".

According to himself, he began his climbing career at the age of 12 in 1910 when an owner of a clothing store promised him a suit if he would climb to the roof of the building. He succeeded.

Over his career Polley climbed over 2000 buildings. In 1920 he climbed the Woolworth building but was arrested, just when he reached the 30th floor and had 27 floors to go, for climbing without official permission. He also climbed 500 ft up the Custom House Tower in Boston. He would often spice up his performance by pretending to slip and fall from a windowsill to another. George G. Polley was also a talented magician and performed in vaudeville with his wife the amazing Helen Stillman. He was a good friend of Harry Houdini and learned some of his tricks from him.

He had three sons: George, Gibson and Stillman.

George Polley died at the age of 29 during an operation to remove a brain tumor.

== See also ==
- Harry Gardiner, another "human fly" of the same era
