= Trapp Family Story =

Television series

- Title card
- トラップ一家物語
- Genre: Period drama
- Screenplay by: Ayo Shiroya
- Directed by: Kōzō Kusuba
- Music by: Shin Kawabe
- Country of origin: Japan
- Original language: Japanese
- No. of episodes: 40

Production
- Executive producer: Koichi Motohashi
- Producers: Yoshihisa Tachikawa (Fuji TV) (Eps 1-25); Minoru Wada (Fuji TV) (Eps 26-40); Takaji Matsudo
- Production companies: Fuji Television; Nippon Animation

Original release
- Network: FNS (Fuji TV)
- Release: January 13 – December 28, 1991

Trapp Family Story (トラップ一家物語, Torappu Ikka Monogatari) is a 1991 Japanese animated series by Nippon Animation, based on the story of the real-life Austrian singing family the Trapp Family. It is a part of the World Masterpiece Theatre franchise, which adapted classic works of literature into animated TV shows. 40 episodes aired on Fuji TV.

== Premise ==
This work is commonly regarded as an adaptation of Maria von Trapp's autobiography, The Story of the Trapp Family Singers. However, neither the author's name nor the title of the source work is credited in the anime itself, and related reference materials differ in how they classify its origins. As a result, the series is also considered by some to be a reconstruction based on historical events and multiple source materials rather than a direct adaptation of a single work (see the "Source material" section below for details).

Within the World Masterpiece Theater series, it was the first story based on a true account since Rascal the Raccoon, and it also stood out as an unusual entry in the series for featuring an adult woman as the protagonist. The original story had already been successfully adapted four times: in the 1956 film The Trapp Family and its 1958 sequel The Trapp Family in America, and in the 1959 stage musical The Sound of Music and its 1965 film adaptation.

The early part of the series depicts the relationship between Maria, the nun serving as governess, and the children of the Trapp family. From the middle onward, following the romantic themes of the previous year's My Daddy Long Legs, the story develops around romance, focusing on the family's internal conflicts over the remarriage of Georg, the father of the Trapp family. Toward the end, the narrative portrays the Trapp family's financial crisis and the Nazi invasion brought on by the Anschluss (Germany's annexation of Austria). The episodes weave in many references to the Nazis, vividly depicting the anguish and complex emotions of some Austrians facing the Nazi threat at that time. The family's eventual escape from Austria is portrayed in a particularly thrilling way.

After the final broadcast, on December 28, 1991, the first ever compilation special in the history of World Masterpiece Theater aired in a two-hour slot (Saturday 10:00–12:00).

Among works in the series based on true stories, one notable feature of this series was that, at the time of its broadcast, some of the real-life individuals portrayed were still alive.

== Plot ==
Maria Kutschera lost both her parents at a young age and had to face many hardships. At eighteen years old, returning from her graduation trip from teacher training school, she suddenly decides to become a nun. She goes to Salzburg and visits Nonnberg Abbey, known as the strictest convent, where she applies and is accepted as a novice. However, Maria's cheerful and energetic personality and her indifference toward customs and discipline gradually leads her to be seen as a problematic presence in the convent, since the nuns expect discipline and proper manners above all. Maria tries to change her way of being, but she does not like it; she prefers to honor her Lord through joy and gratitude for life and everything in it.

One day, the Mother Superior sends Maria at Baron Georg von Trapp's house, an Austrian hero and aristocrat, for nine months as governess to his second daughter, a frail child also named Maria. The Baron is a widower, and none of the twenty-five governesses he had previously hired had been accepted by his seven children. At first, the children are withdrawn and rebellious, but they gradually open up to Maria's innocent and honest nature. After some time, through joy, song, and poetry, Maria wins the children's hearts and respect, filling them all with happiness. Maria also gains the Baron's affection.

Georg realizes that he is in love with Maria and breaks off his engagement with his fiancée, Lady Yvonne. Later, at the insistence of his children, he asks Maria to marry him, against the opinion of Baroness Matilda, an aristocrat who manages the household. At first, Maria is hesitant and returns to the convent for a time, but soon she understands her feelings and comes back to marry the Baron and become a mother to his children.

Facing financial difficulties, the Trapp family turns their villa into a guesthouse. Lotte Lehmann, a visiting opera singer discovers the children singing and encourages them to perform at the Salzburg Festival. Despite being amateurs, their enthusiasm and folk songs win the hearts of the audience, leading to radio appearances, a performance at Vienna's Kleine Halle, and a meeting with American impresario Mr. Wagner, who offers them a U.S. tour, which they initially decline.

However, problems arise with the arrival of the threats of World War II, as the Nazis take control of Austria, a year before the conflict. The Trapp family is unhappy with their new life and resent the fact that Adolf Hitler himself wants them to sing at his parties. Baron von Trapp, a war hero and patriot, refuses to cooperate with the regime, and they discover that their butler Hans is a Nazi supporter assigned to watch them. For this reason, they decide to leave Austria to go far away to begin their new life, far from the war. With the help of trusted friend Franz, Georg, Maria (now pregnant), and the seven children secretly flee their home, cross the mountains to Italy, and later reach New York in the United States, where, with Wagner's assistance, they gain fame performing their native folk songs.

== Characters ==
- Maria Augusta Kutschera von Trapp (voiced by Masako Katsuki) – 18 years old, she is sent to the von Trapp house as a governess.
- Georg von Trapp (voiced by Katsunosuke Hori) – 38 years old, Georg is the head of the von Trapp family and loves own children.
- Rupert von Trapp (voiced by Shinobu Adachi) – 14 years old and the firstborn of Baron von Trapp, he is a fencer.
- Hedwig von Trapp (voiced by Maria Kawamura) – 13 years old, she is the oldest daughter of Baron von Trapp. Hedwig hates Maria at first before warming up to her.
- Werner Ritter von Trapp (voiced by Yōko Matsuoka) – 10 years old, he is a very playful boy.
- Maria Agathe Franziska 'Mitzi' von Trapp (voiced by Yuri Shiratori and Charvie Abelete) – 8 years old, Maria is the second oldest daughter of Baron von Trapp. She is very close to her deceased mother, Agatha, who is the reason Maria was sent to the von Trapp house as a governess.
- Johanna Karoline von Trapp (voiced by Hiromi Ishikawa) – 6 years old, Johanna is a girl who laughs a lot and is put under Maria's care as well.
- Martina von Trapp (voiced by Saori Suzuki) – 4 years old, she always brings her teddy bear, Nikola, everywhere.
- Agathe von Trapp (voiced by Naoko Watanabe) – 3 years old, Agathe is the youngest daughter of Baron von Trapp.
- Johannes von Trapp – born in the series finale.
- Agatha Whitehead von Trapp – Georg's late wife and mother of his seven children.
- Hans (voiced by Masato Hirano) – the von Trapp family butler, he is eventually revealed to support Germany near the end of the series.
- Baroness Matilda (voiced by Toshiko Fujita) – head of the von Trapp household servants, she is an aristocrat who came to assist Baron von Trapp in caring for his children and running his household after the death of his wife.
- Mimi (voiced by Junko Hagimori) – a young maid who works for the Trapp family until she goes to marry her boyfriend.
- Rosy – head cook of the household.
- Clarine (voiced by Kyōko Irokawa) – baroness Matilda's maid who accompanies her during Matilda's time at the von Trapp household.
- Franz (voiced by Takao Ōyama) – the Trapp family gardener.
- Dr. Vortman – a Jewish doctor who helps the von Trapp family multiple times during the series; he is taken away by the Germans.
- Mother Abbess – head of Nonnberg Abbey, she sent Maria to the Trapp family as governess.
- Rafaela (voiced by Aya Hisakawa) – friend of Maria during her time at the abbey.
- Dolores – mistress of novices in the abbey.
- Thomas – a boy attending the school Maria briefly taught at while training to be a sister of Nonnberg Abbey. He later plays an important role in helping Hedwig reunite with her family after she ran away from home and was robbed of her valuables.
- Sister Lucia – sister of the abbey who rarely speaks.
- Sister Laura – sister of the abbey who helped Maria teach the children Bible study.
- Hannah – a novice of Nonnberg Abbey, along with Elizabeth, both of whom share the same room as Maria and Rafaela.
- Elizabeth – a novice of Nonnberg Abbey, along with Hannah, both of whom share the same room as Maria and Rafaela.
- Karl – Mimi's boyfriend, he helps the Trapp family flee towards Italy as Germany was about to close its borders, including the annexed Austria.
- Lady Yvonne Belvedere (voiced by Eiko Yamada) – daughter of Earl Belvedere and supposed fiancée of Baron Georg von Trapp.
- Nastassja Ivanovna – Hedwig's best friend and Rupert and Anton's love interest.
- Anton – the rival of Rupert von Trapp and a friend of Nastassja.
- Kurt Schuschnigg – president of Austria.
- Franz Wasner (voiced by Katsuji Mori) – a priest who comes to live at the house nearing the end of the series.
- Dennis Wagner – a talent scout from the U.S. who visits Austria to watch the Trapp family perform at a concert.
- Lotte Lehmann – renowned German opera singer who discovers the Trapp Family singers when she arrives at their home to rent out a room. She convinces them to perform in front of an audience at the Salzburg festival.
- Marian Anderson – mentioned only, Marian is a famous opera singer from America who performed in Vienna at a concert the same day as the Trapps.
- Unnamed High-Ranking Member of the Gestapo – a Nazi with a menacing presence, closely resembling the likeness of Reinhard Heydrich.
- Adolf Hitler – dictator of Germany from 1933 to 1945.

== Source material ==
As noted above, the series is commonly regarded as an adaptation of Maria von Trapp's autobiography, The Story of the Trapp Family Singers (published in Japanese in 1954 by Chūō Shuppansha, translated by Taneaki Otabe). However, its status as the definitive source material varies across reference works. Unlike most entries in the World Masterpiece Theater series, the work is based not on a children's novel but on an autobiographical account with historical and religious themes.

Unlike other World Masterpiece Theater productions, the anime's opening and ending credits do not identify either an original author or an original work, nor are they listed on the official website or in Futabasha's World Masterpiece Theater Official Guide. That guide explicitly states that "there is no original work; the series is based on a true story," presenting it as a direct dramatization of the historical von Trapp family rather than an adaptation of a specific literary source. By contrast, Kaori Chiba's World Masterpiece Theater Series Memorial Book: Europe Edition introduces The Story of the Trapp Family Singers alongside the picture book The Trapp Family Book in a dedicated column and treats Maria von Trapp as an original author. Nevertheless, unlike other entries in the volume, the series introduction itself does not list either an original title or an original author. Similarly, the English-language official website describes the series simply as being "based on the true story of the von Trapp family, also known as Sound of Music."

The production also benefited from the cooperation of Johannes von Trapp, one of Maria's sons, and Hans Wilhelm, author of the 1983 picture book The Trapp Family Book. A Japanese edition of Wilhelm's book was published in 1991 under the same title as the anime, The Trapp Family Story. Wilhelm later stated that, shortly after the book's publication, it was adapted into an animated television series in Japan, suggesting that his work served as one of the sources used during the production of the anime.

Taken together, these circumstances suggest that The Story of the Trapp Family Singers was not treated as the series' sole source material, but rather as one of several references consulted during production. Under this interpretation, the anime is best understood not as a straightforward adaptation of a single literary work, but as a reconstruction of the history of the von Trapp family based on multiple published sources and firsthand accounts. If this view is adopted, it may be regarded as the only World Masterpiece Theater television series to be based primarily on the reconstruction of real historical events from multiple documentary sources, rather than on the adaptation of a single literary work.

== Adaptation ==
When Maria was sent to the Von Trapp family, she was 21 years old according to both historical records and the original autobiography. The age difference between Georg and Maria was 25 years (20 years in this adaptation). The order of the children also differs slightly: in reality, it was: Rupert, Agathe, Maria, Werner, Hedwig, Johanna and Martina, whereas the adaptation rearranges them. Additionally, the mother's original name is Agathe. Historically, more than ten years passed between Georg and Maria's marriage and the family's emigration to the United States (about a year in the series). During that time, they had two daughters, Rosmarie and Eleonore. Maria was also pregnant during the escape, giving birth later to the youngest child, Johannes. The butler, Hans Schweiger, was a Nazi party member but acted cooperatively with the family, warning them not to discuss politics in front of him and suggesting their escape when concert opportunities arose in the U.S.

Some other differences and details are borrowed from the musical The Sound of Music. In both the historical account and the original autobiography, Maria was still a postulant when she was sent to be a governess, not a novice. In this adaptation, however—like in the musical film—she is sent as a novice with a temporary appointment, later leaving the convent and marrying Georg, following the same narrative arc as the movie. In the anime, Maria teases Georg with a military salute, a detail borrowed from the musical and absent in the novel. In the novel, Maria is accepted by the children without difficulty. In contrast, the film introduces initial tension, particularly with Liesl (Hedwig in the anime), who resists the new governess. The anime borrows this element from the film, making it a central theme.

In episode 16 of the anime and in the musical, Maria briefly returns to the convent—after Martina's near-accident in the anime, and because she realizes she loves Georg in the film. In the anime, Maria and Johanna attempt to visit her secretly but are blocked by the nuns; in the film, all the children try to reach her in the city but are similarly prevented. In the novel, Maria never actually leaves for the convent; she considers leaving when she notices Georg's affection but is persuaded to stay by Yvonne. In episode 39 of the anime and in the film, Georg removes the Nazi flag from the villa's window and tears it. In the novel, the incident is far less significant, mentioned only in passing to indicate that Georg did not display the flag as ordered by the Nazis. Aside from these points, there are other minor differences, but overall the adaptation aligns more closely with historical events than the musical version.

Additionally, like the musical, the anime adapts only the first part of the novel. However, some scenes from the second part were included in the series. In episode 35, during a performance at Vienna's Kleine Halle, a fly enters little Johanna's mouth, forcing her to skip her solo. In the novel, this incident happens to Maria during an American concert, creating laughter and helping the Trapp family choir connect with the audience. In episode 40, during the family's escape from Austria, they cross the Alps hidden in a funeral carriage. In the novel, a similar episode involves the family improvising transportation after a concert due to wartime austerity, using a funeral carriage to reach the station.

== Episodes ==
1. My Aspiration to be a Catholic Nun
2. My Future as a Sister
3. The Captain and his 7 Children
4. The 26th Governess
5. Maria is the Cause of Drama
6. The Missing children and the Hunger Rebellion
7. I can not trust Adults
8. Courtesy is Important!?
9. Baron Trapp's Fiancé?
10. Sewing Machine and Violin
11. Playing in the Mud is Supreme
12. Chocolate Cake: Maria Style
13. Don Quixote's First Love
14. The Music Box's Secret
15. Martina and the Bear, Nikola
16. The House without Fraulein Maria
17. The Wounded Fawn
18. All God's Creatures, Great and Small
19. Lady Yvonne's Gifts
20. Each Person's Life
21. Baron von Trapp's Decision
22. Can You Live Alone?
23. Letters to the Angel
24. Christmas Carol
25. In The Snow Of The Alps
26. The Orange and the Flower Seeds
27. Yesterday, Today and Tomorrow
28. Naughty Agathe
29. Person Who Becomes Wife and Mother
30. Marriage?
31. God's Decree
32. A Bride in July
33. A True Family
34. The Trapp Family Singers
35. Singing in the Wind
36. The German Invasion
37. The New Salute
38. Hans' Secret
39. Pride and Belief
40. Farewell to My Country

== Music ==
=== Opening themes ===
The opening theme differed depending on the broadcasting. The series first used "Doremi no Uta (Doremi Song)" as the intro theme during earlier broadcasting, but the DVD and video version of the series uses "Hohoemi no Mahou (Smile Magic)" as the new opening song.

1. "Doremi Song [ドレミのうた] (Do-Re-Mi no Uta)" by Eri Itō and Children's Choir of the Forest (early broadcasting version). This was a Japanese adaptation of the song Do-Re-Mi from The Sound of Music.
1. "Smile Magic [ほほえみの魔法] (Hohoemi no Mahou)" by Eri Itō (video, DVD, and later rebroadcasting version)

=== Ending themes ===
1. "With Outstretched Hands [両手を広げて] (Ryoute wo hirogete)" by Eri Itō
