= Trapp =

Trapp is a surname. Notable people with the surname include:

- A. A. Trapp (1918–2007), Canadian politician from Manitoba
- Albert Trapp (died 1953), Canadian politician from Manitoba
- Darren Trapp (died 2008), Belizean grenade attack victim
- George Trapp (educator) (1906–1996), Scottish scientist and educator
- George Joseph Trapp (1909–2002), Canadian educator and politician
- George Leonard Trapp (1894–1917), Canadian World War I flying ace
- James Trapp (born 1969), American sprinter and football player
- John Trapp (1601–1669), English Anglican Bible commentator
- John Q. Trapp (born 1945), American basketball player
- J. B. Trapp (1925–2005), English historian
- Joseph Trapp (1679–1747), English academic and cleric
- Kevin Trapp (born 1990), German football player
- Martin E. Trapp (1877–1951), American politician from Oklahoma
- Petr Trapp (born 1985), Czech footballer
- Wil Trapp (born 1993), American soccer player
- Wilhelm Trapp (1889–1948), German Nazi policeman, executed for war crimes
- Trapp Family, Austrian noble family immortalized in the stage musical and film The Sound of Music
  - Georg von Trapp (1880–1947), naval officer and head of the family
  - Hede von Trapp (1877–1947), Austrian painter and poet, sister of Georg
  - Maria von Trapp (1905–1987), stepmother and matriarch of the Trapp Family Singers
  - Maria Franziska von Trapp (1914–2014), member of the Trapp Family Singers
  - Elisabeth von Trapp (born 1955), folk singer, granddaughter of Georg
- Lilian von Trapp (born 1987), German jewellery designer

Fictional characters:

- Captain Edward Trapp, a fictional hero of Brian Callison's 4-book series

== See also ==
- Trapp, Carmarthenshire, village in south-west Wales
- Trapp, Kentucky, an unincorporated community
- Trapp basalts, or flood basalt, rock formation phenomenon
- Trapp Family Austrian Relief Inc.
