= The Sound of Music Live! =

2013 American television special

- Promotional poster
- Genre: Musical drama
- Created by: Craig Zadan; Neil Meron
- Based on: The Sound of Music by Howard Lindsay; Russel Crouse
- Written by: Austin Winsberg
- Directed by: Rob Ashford; Beth McCarthy-Miller
- Presented by: NBC
- Starring: Carrie Underwood; Stephen Moyer; Audra McDonald; Laura Benanti; Christian Borle
- Composer: Richard Rodgers
- Country of origin: United States
- Original language: English

Production
- Executive producers: Craig Zadan; Neil Meron
- Producer: Priscilla Taussig
- Production locations: Grumman Studios; Bethpage, New York
- Running time: 135 minutes
- Production companies: Sony Pictures Television; Universal Television

Original release
- Network: NBC
- Release: December 5, 2013

The Sound of Music Live! is an American television special that was originally broadcast by NBC on December 5, 2013, and produced by Sony Pictures Television and Universal Television. Directed by Rob Ashford and Beth McCarthy-Miller, produced by Craig Zadan and Neil Meron, and written by Austin Winsberg, the special was an adaptation of Rodgers and Hammerstein's 1959 Broadway musical The Sound of Music. The television special starred country singer and American Idol winner Carrie Underwood as Maria von Trapp, and was performed and televised live from Grumman Studios in Bethpage, New York.

Spearheaded by NBC chairman Bob Greenblatt, the network positioned the special as being a live television "event". In preparing for the broadcast, Meron and Zadan emphasized the logistical challenges that they would face due to the live aspects of the special, and the fact that The Sound of Music Live! was an adaptation based on the musical itself and not the 1965 film version. Meron felt that if the telecast were successful, the concept could become "another kind of entertainment that can exist on TV." By her request, Underwood's casting as Maria was personally endorsed by Julie Andrews, who starred in the 1965 film.

The production was met with mixed reviews; much of its criticism was directed towards the casting of Carrie Underwood to play Maria, whom critics (including the real-life von Trapp family) believed was not experienced enough in theatre to portray such an iconic role. While her vocal performance was praised, her acting was described by critics as "amateur", "lifeless" and lacking emotion. The production was a ratings success for NBC; with a total of 18.62 million live viewers, The Sound of Music Live! brought the network its highest Thursday night viewership for an entertainment program since the series finale of Frasier in 2004, and prompted NBC to sign Zadan and Meron on to produce more live musicals for the network.

== Plot ==
Maria Rainer, a postulant at Nonnberg Abbey in Salzburg, is contemplating the day she has spent in the mountains. When she returns to the Abbey, she learns from the Mother Abbess that she is to be the new governess for the von Trapp children. When Maria arrives at the von Trapp house, she is greeted coldly by the Captain and introduced to the children, who enter with military precision. Maria finds that the Captain has emotionally closed himself off since the death of his wife, and decides to teach his children the basics of singing to gain their trust and acceptance.

A month, later the Captain returns home with Elsa Schraeder, whom he is courting, and their friend Max Detweiler, who is looking for the perfect local singing group to perform at the annual Kaltzberg Festival. When his children arrive dressed in play clothes Maria had made from her old bedroom curtains, he is outraged and embarrassed. Maria then confronts the Captain and tells him that he does not know or understand his children, and that they need him, but this only upsets him more and he orders her to return to Nonnberg Abbey. However, upon hearing his children sing to Schraeder, his eyes are opened to the truth Maria had been speaking and he embraces his children, asking Maria to stay on as governess.

The Captain throws a grand party to introduce Schraeder, and when the band plays the Ländler, the captain's youngest son Kurt asks Maria to teach him the dance, and the captain steps in to help her. As the two dance, an unspoken attraction begins to arise between them, and Maria puts a stop to the dancing. However, this unspoken attraction does not go unnoticed by the Captain's daughter Brigitta, who confronts Maria on this. Though Maria strongly denies it, she begins to realize that Brigitta is telling the truth. Schraeder calls the children out to say good night to the guests, and Max is instantly smitten with the idea of having the children sing in the festival. Meanwhile, Maria sneaks off unnoticed and returns to the Abbey, where she confides in the Mother Abbess that she has fallen in love with the captain and is ready to take her vows of poverty, obedience and chastity. The Mother Abbess denies her this, and encourages her to face her problem head-on and find the life she was born to live.

Maria then returns to the von Trapp home and is warmly greeted by the children, whom had no longer felt the joys of singing due to her sudden departure. When she finds out that the Captain intends to marry Schraeder, she decides to see her duties through until arrangements can be made for a new governess. However, the political differences between Schraeder and the Captain cause the two to realize that they have no future together, and she leaves. Meanwhile, the Captain meets with Maria and the two admit their feelings for each other. The two agree to marry at the Abbey, and while the two are on honeymoon, Germany annexes Austria.

When they return, the Captain is ordered to accept a commission in the German Navy and report immediately to Bremerhaven. Maria, thinking quickly, hands the Admiral in charge the program for the Kaltzberg Festival showing that the von Trapp Family Singers are scheduled to perform, so the Captain couldn’t possibly leave right away. They are granted permission to perform. During the finale, Max announces that a guard of honor is waiting to escort the Captain away as soon as the concert is over. Maria leads the family in one more song, during which they escape one by one and flee to the Abbey. The Nazi soldiers search the Abbey for the von Trapps to no avail, as the family decides to flee Austria over the mountains with Maria's help.

== Cast and crew ==
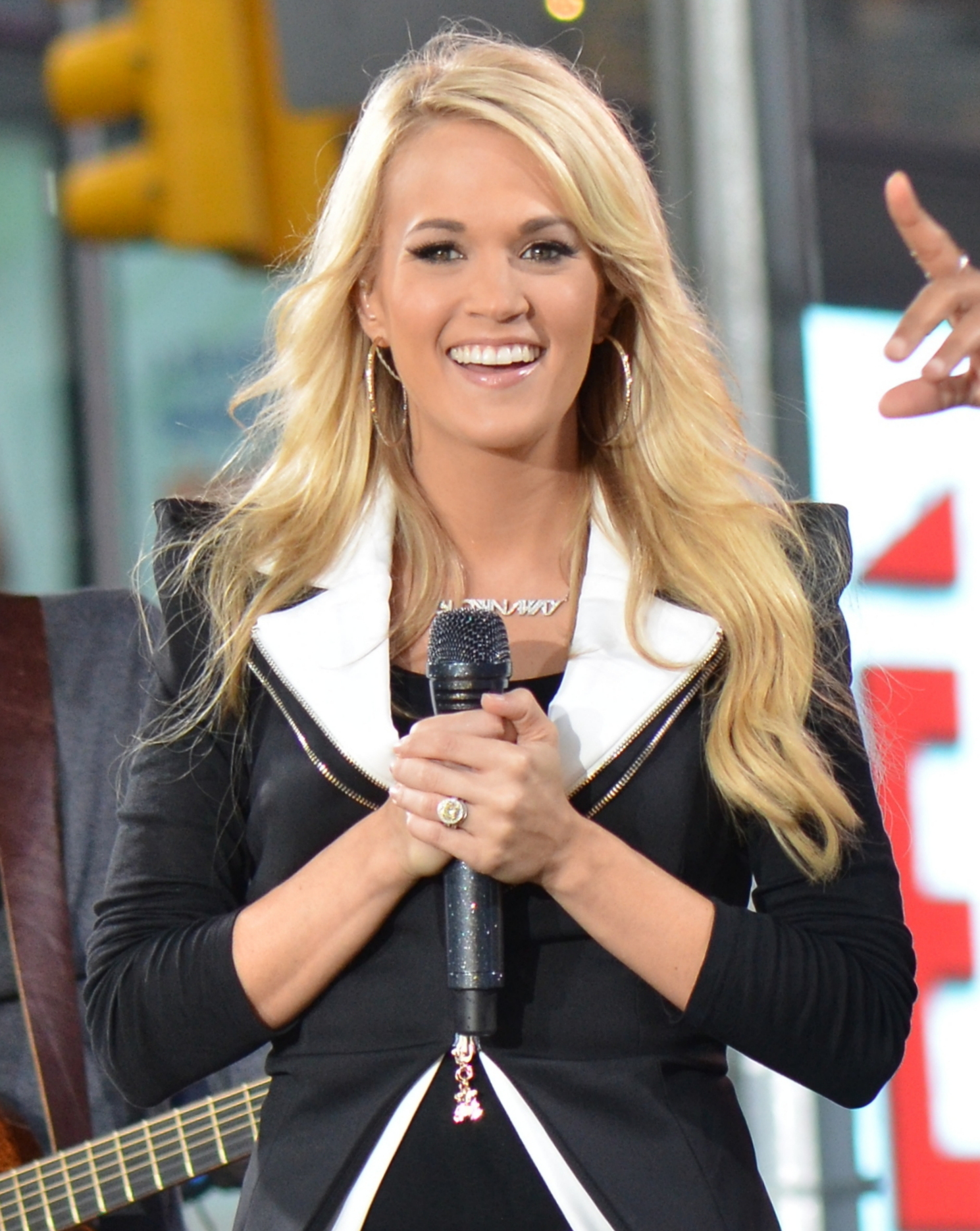
Carrie Underwood in 2012

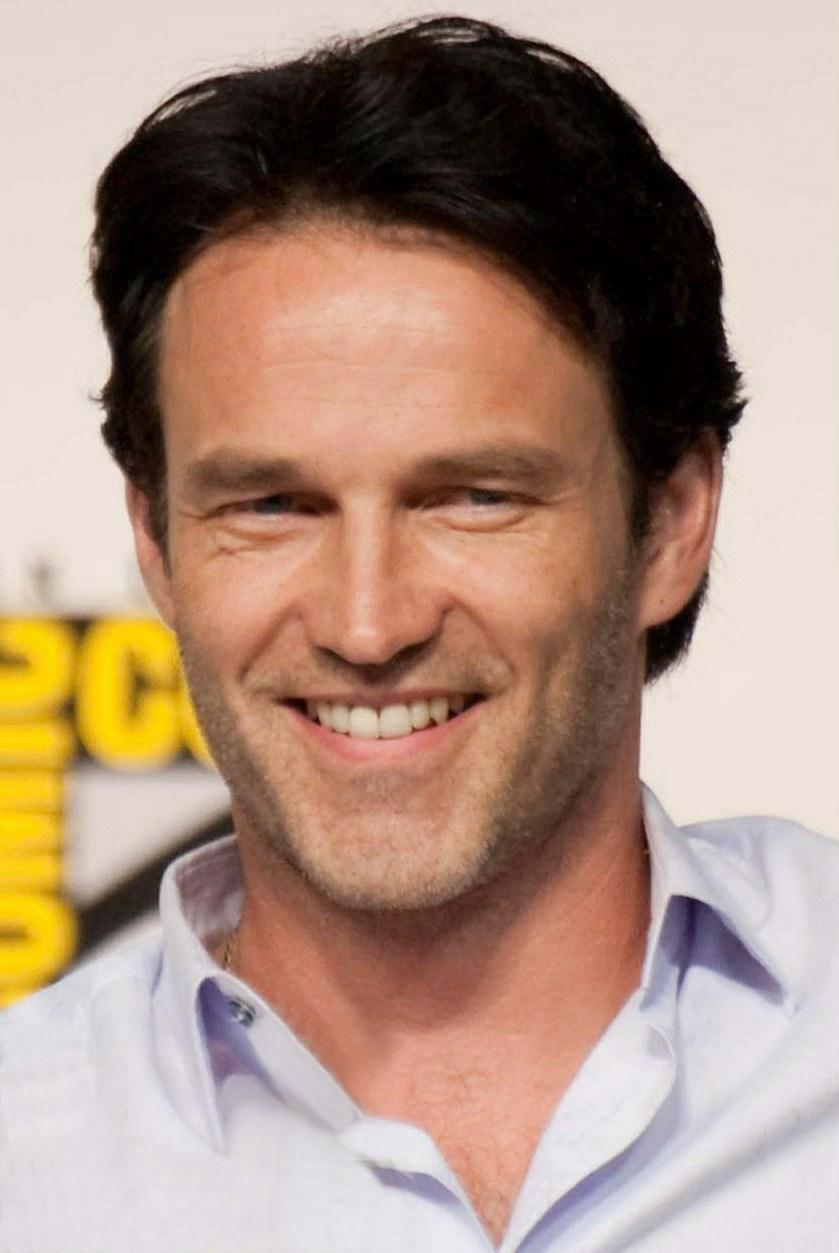
Stephen Moyer

Main

- Carrie Underwood as Maria von Trapp (née Rainer)
- Stephen Moyer as Captain Georg von Trapp
- Laura Benanti as Elsa Schräder / Fräulein Schweiger
- Christian Borle as Max Detweiler
- Audra McDonald as Mother Abbess

Supporting

- Ariane Rinehart as Liesl von Trapp
- Michael Campayno as Rolf
- Sophia Anne Caruso as Brigitta von Trapp
- Peyton Ella as Gretl von Trapp
- Michael Nigro as Friedrich von Trapp
- Grace Rundhaug as Marta von Trapp
- Ella Watts-Gorman as Louisa von Trapp
- Joe West as Kurt von Trapp
- Jessica Molaskey as Sister Berthe
- Christiane Noll as Sister Margaretta
- Elena Shaddow as Sister Sophia
- Kristine Nielsen as Frau Schmidt
- C.J. Wilson as Herr Zeller
- Sean Cullen as Franz
- John Bolger as Admiral von Scheiber
- Michael Park as Baron Elberfeld
- Ashley Brown as Ursula

Benanti had previously portrayed Maria von Trapp on Broadway in 1998. Craig Zadan and Neil Meron, who had previously worked with Borle on the NBC musical drama television series Smash, served as executive producers. Other credits include Rob Ashford and Beth McCarthy-Miller as directors, Ashford also was the choreographer, Priscilla Taussig served as producer, David Chase as music director and Derek McLane as production designer. Catherine Zuber was costume designer and Bernie Telsey was the casting director. The production is taken from the book by Howard Lindsay and Russel Crouse and is based on the memoir, The Story of the Trapp Family Singers by Maria von Trapp.

== Development and promotion ==
On June 30, 2012, NBC's chairman Bob Greenblatt announced the network's plans to broadcast a live adaptation of the Broadway musical The Sound of Music in 2013. On November 30, 2012, the network announced that country music singer and American Idol fourth season winner Carrie Underwood would star as Maria von Trapp in the production. In a statement, Greenblatt justified Underwood's involvement, saying that "[Maria] was an iconic woman who will now be played by an iconic artist." On September 16, 2013, NBC revealed the full cast of the special, and released a promotional image depicting Underwood as Maria von Trapp, wearing blond braids and a dirndl, referencing one of Julie Andrews' "most iconic moments" from the film adaptation. Prior to being cast, Underwood personally asked Andrews for her endorsement of the role and the production, explaining that "whenever I do a cover of somebody's song or whatever, I always get permission of the artist first."

Produced on a budget of around $9 million, The Sound of Music Live! was broadcast live from a soundstage built at Grumman Studios in Bethpage, New York. NBC, as well as producers Craig Zadan and Neil Meron, emphasized that the production was not a remake of the film, but an adaptation of the musical itself; Meron iterated that "the audience will discover, within the first few minutes of watching the show, that they are not seeing a TV version of the movie. They'll know right away it's The Sound of Music, but it's a different Sound of Music than they are accustomed to seeing on film." Meron felt that if successful, the broadcast could "open the door to another kind of entertainment that can exist on TV." He also praised the involvement of Underwood as the star of the production, believing that she was a quick learner, and "has all of the qualities of Maria." Greenblatt was highly supportive of the project, as he was, in the words of Zadan, a "passionate devotee of theater". Zadan considered the production to be "one of the profoundly complicated, amazing experiences we’ve ever had", noting the additional challenges created by the live broadcast.

Promoted by NBC as a "three-hour holiday event", The Sound of Music Live! was aired as part of a push by NBC to air more live entertainment specials. Among its most popular programs in recent years have been those with live components (such as The Voice and Sunday Night Football); NBC's Jennifer Salke believed that the increased level of social network interaction possible in a live broadcast, along with the feeling of being part of an "event", would encourage viewers to watch the special live instead of on-demand or from a recording. NBC's previous attempt at event television, The Million Second Quiz, was met with mixed reviews and viewership, but NBC did indicate that Subway's advertising throughout the series brought a higher level of awareness to the brand. The television special was also the first live musical special in almost fifty years on NBC.

Retail chain Walmart served as the presenting sponsor for The Sound of Music Live!. NBC also produced five themed Walmart commercials to air throughout the special, featuring scenes of a family using products from the store set to songs from The Sound of Music. The five ads were timed to air during the commercial break following the scene where the song was featured; NBC's advertising chief Dan Lovinger considered the ads to be a way to "enhance the excitement" of the presentation for families.

== Musical numbers ==
The list of musical numbers is taken from the actual broadcast and are in order as they appear in the broadcast and include the characters' names who perform the song.

- "Preludium" – Nuns
- "The Sound of Music" – Maria
- "Maria" – Sister Berthe, Sister Sophia, Sister Margaretta, and the Mother Abbess
- "My Favorite Things" – Maria and the Mother Abbess
- "My Favorite Things" (reprise 1) – Maria and Sister Margaretta
- "Do-Re-Mi" – Maria and the children
- "Sixteen Going on Seventeen" – Rolf and Liesl
- "The Lonely Goatherd" – Maria and the children
- "How Can Love Survive" – Max and Elsa
- "The Sound of Music" (reprise) – The children, the captain, and Maria
- "The Grand Waltz" (instrumental)
- "Ländler" (instrumental)
- "So Long, Farewell" – The children & Party Guests
- "Climb Ev'ry Mountain" – Mother Abbess
- "The Lonely Goatherd" (reprise) – Max and the children
- "Do-Re-Mi" (reprise) – The children
- "Do-Re-Mi" (reprise 2) – The captain
- "The Sound of Music" (reprise 2) – The captain and the children
- "My Favorite Things" (reprise) – The children and Maria
- "No Way to Stop It" – Elsa, Max and the captain
- "Something Good" – Maria and the captain
- "Processional" – Nuns
- "Maria" (reprise) – Nuns
- "Sixteen Going on Seventeen" (reprise) – Maria and Liesl
- "Do-Re-Mi" (reprise 3) – Maria, the children, and the captain
- "Edelweiss" – The captain, Maria, and the children
- "So Long, Farewell" (reprise) – Maria, the children, and the captain
- "Finale Ultimo: Climb Ev'ry Mountain" – Mother Abbess, Nuns, Maria, the children, and the captain
- "End Credits" (instrumental)

== Reception ==
=== Critical reception ===
Prior to the broadcast, members of the real-life von Trapp family were critical of casting Underwood to play Maria, agreeing with the notion that she would be a good singer but a poor actor. They suggested that Anne Hathaway, who played Fantine in the 2012 film adaptation of Les Misérables for which she won the Academy Award for Best Supporting Actress, would have been a better choice. The Sound of Music Live! received mixed reviews from entertainment critics, commending the show for its scope and supporting cast while questioning Underwood's acting capabilities.

Kevin Fallon of The Daily Beast wrote: "Naturally, Underwood sounded astounding, as alive as those damned hills, every time she was asked to stand on top of things and belt. But whether it was because of nerves or lack of experience, her acting was painfully lifeless and amateur throughout the first two thirds of the lengthy ordeal. The singer, it seems, is a proud graduate of the school of 'If I don't blink, they'll think I'm acting!'" Verne Gay of Newsday liked Underwood's performance, commenting that not only could she sing, but "she is a luminous stage presence who had the guts to take on one of the most iconic roles of the stage or screen."

Brian Lowry of Variety described the production "as lifeless as [its] alpine backdrops." Marc Bernardin of The Hollywood Reporter commended the production's aesthetics but called it a "very expensive karaoke", and he wrote that Underwood "doesn’t acquit herself so well when it comes to the carrying the emotional weight of the production." He also panned Moyer, criticizing his vocal performance and describing "his attempt at conveying an emotional hollowness" as "mildly constipated" and "clenched." However, he lauded Benanti, Borle and McDonald's "strong" performances.

In her tweet, Underwood responded to the negative reception from her critics by saying, "Plain and simple: Mean people need Jesus. They will be in my prayers tonight", before closing off with a reference to the entire second chapter of the First Epistle of Peter.

=== Ratings ===
18.62 million viewers watched The Sound of Music Live!, making it the most-watched program of the night. It had a 4.6 rating, 13 share in the 18–49 demographic, which led all networks. It attracted NBC's largest non-sports Thursday audience since the series finale of Frasier in 2004 (which averaged 22.6 million viewers), and NBC's largest non-sports audience on any night since the 2007 Golden Globe Awards. The special performed the best with women in the 25–54 demographic, reaching a household rating of 7.0 for that demographic during the primetime broadcast. It did particularly well in Oklahoma City, the capital of Underwood's home state, where it was watched by 28% of TV viewers. At least 38.69 million viewers watched a portion of The Sound of Music Live!. Factoring in DVR viewership over the week following the broadcast, the special was viewed by 21.84 million, with 3.1 million within the first three days.

Following its original airing, an encore presentation of The Sound of Music Live! aired on December 14, 2013, attracting 3.1 million viewers. It notably displaced one of NBC's two traditional airings of the film It's a Wonderful Life (the other being on Christmas Eve), which was bumped ahead to December 20, 2013.

NBC's Bob Greenblatt considered the production to be a success, and signed Meron and Zadan to produce another live musical for the 2014 holiday season. Greenblatt felt that there were enough recognizable, family-friendly musicals to make events such as The Sound of Music Live! an annual tradition, and he indicated that NBC received e-mails and phone calls from various theatrical rightsholders, expressing interest in having their musicals adapted in a similar fashion, In January 2014, NBC announced that it would broadcast a live version of Peter Pan in December 2014, and at NBC's upfronts in May 2014, Greenblatt announced that NBC had also obtained rights to produce an adaptation of The Music Man, although the network did not announce any timeframe for the production. It was later revealed that The Music Man project was put on hold for a live performance of The Wiz. Interest in the concept also spread to competing networks: in April 2014, Fox announced that it would produce a live production of Grease, which aired in January 2016. NBC aired Hairspray Live! later that year.

The special also had an influence on viewership for ABC's annual broadcast of the 1965 film version of The Sound of Music; with 6.5 million viewers and a 1.3 share, it was ABC's highest-rated airing of the film since 2007, although it was beaten by NBC's Sunday Night Football.

=== Accolades ===
Award	Category	Nominee(s)	Result	Ref.
Black Reel Awards	Outstanding Supporting Actress, TV Movie or Limited Series	Audra McDonald	Nominated	
Directors Guild of America Awards	Outstanding Directorial Achievement in Movies for Television and Mini-Series	Beth McCarthy-Miller and Rob Ashford	Nominated	
Gold Derby Awards	Best TV Movie/Mini Supporting Actress	Audra McDonald	Nominated	
Primetime Emmy Awards	Outstanding Directing for a Variety Special	Beth McCarthy-Miller and Rob Ashford	Nominated	
Primetime Creative Arts Emmy Awards	Outstanding Special Class Program	Craig Zadan, Neil Meron and Priscilla Taussig	Nominated	
Primetime Creative Arts Emmy Awards	Outstanding Music Direction	David Chase	Nominated	
Primetime Creative Arts Emmy Awards	Outstanding Technical Direction, Camerawork, Video Control for a Miniseries, Movie or a Special	Emmett Loughran, Robert Muller, Rob Balton, Jerry Cancel, Leslie Hankey, Ray Hoover, Charlie Huntley, Andrew Jansen, Jay Kulick, Jeff Latonero, Pat Minietta, Brian Phraner, Claus Stuhl Weissenburg, Mark Whitman, Susan Noll and Yoneet Solange	Won	

== Soundtrack ==
A soundtrack for the broadcast was released on December 3, 2013 and consists of 22 studio recordings. Walmart outlets exclusively released a nine-track instrumental (sing-along) bonus CD with the soundtrack. It peaked at number 17 on the Billboard 200 and number 2 on the Billboard Soundtracks chart. The soundtrack had sold 103,000 copies as of January 2, 2014.

== Home media release ==
A DVD of the special was released on December 17, 2013, through Universal Studios Home Entertainment. The DVD includes a behind-the-scenes look, titled "The Making of The Sound of Music Live!" and a preview of the soundtrack. It was released on DVD in Canada on January 7, 2014.

== See also ==
- 2013 in American television
- The Sound of Music Live (2015), UK TV production
- Grease: Live (2016), Fox
- A Christmas Story Live! (2017), Fox
- Rent: Live (2019), Fox
