= Elisabeth von Trapp =

American folk singer (born 1955)

- Born: 1955 (age 70–71); Lamoille County, Vermont, U.S.
- Occupation: Musician
- Spouse: Ed Hall
- Parent: Werner von Trapp
- Relatives: Agatha Whitehead (grandmother); Georg von Trapp (grandfather); Maria von Trapp (grand stepmother)

Elisabeth von Trapp (born 1955) is an American folk singer.

== Biography ==
Elisabeth von Trapp is the granddaughter of Georg and Agathe Whitehead von Trapp and the daughter of Werner von Trapp. The Trapp Family Singers, which Georg and his second wife Maria founded in Austria and brought with them to the United States when they left Austria in 1938, included Elisabeth's father, Werner von Trapp.

The Family Singers disbanded in 1957, but Elisabeth grew up with her father's guitar playing and singing in and around the musical family's home, the Trapp Family Lodge in Stowe, Vermont. She began taking piano lessons when she was eight, and by the age of 16 she was playing the guitar and traveling the back roads of New England to perform with her siblings at weddings, gospel meetings, and town halls.

Her musical style draws on many genres, including modern and Gregorian Chant, hymns, psalms, and works by Hildegard von Bingen. She has appeared with Erich Kory and has performed in the U.S., Russia, and Austria as well as European cathedrals and Washington, DC's Kennedy Center for the Performing Arts.
