= Ernst Florian Winter =

American historian and politologist (1923–2014)

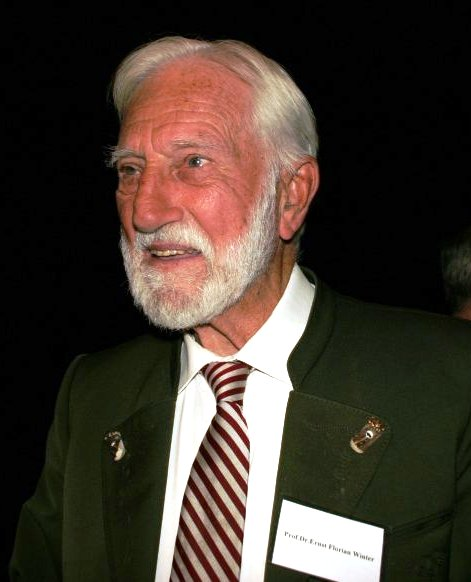
- Winter in September 2007
- Born: 16 December 1923; Vienna, Austria
- Died: 16 April 2014 (aged 90)
- Education: University of Michigan; Columbia College
- Occupations: Historian, political scientist
- Spouse: Johanna von Trapp (m. 1948; died 1994)
- Children: 7

Ernst Florian Winter (16 December 1923 – 16 April 2014) was an American historian and political scientist, the first director of the Diplomatic Academy of Vienna after World War II, and chairman of the International Council of the Austrian Service Abroad.

== Biography ==
=== Childhood ===
Ernst Florian Winter was born in Vienna, Austria, the oldest of eight children of the sociologist and former third vice mayor of Vienna (1934–36) Ernst Karl Winter. He attended the humanistic grammar school in the Klostergasse in Währing, after which he attended Neulandschule. He was a member of the Austrian Catholic Bund Neuland. Alfons Stilfried and the brothers Otto and Fritz Molden were in the same group.

Winter accompanied his father, Ernst Karl, very early in his political career. Regularly there were hour-long discussions at their family residences, attended by people such as Alfred Missong, August Maria Knoll, Hans Karl von Zessnerspitzberg, and Engelbert Dollfuss. When federal chancellor Kurt Schuschnigg returned from meeting with Hitler at the Berghof on 12 February 1938, he visited the Winters' home to speak with Ernst Karl Winter. The 14-year-old Ernst Florian Winter kept the minutes of this discussion.

A few days before the Anschluss in March 1938, Ernst Karl Winter fled Austria to Switzerland, for political reasons, at the urging of Hans Kelsen. He had to leave his family behind. When the Gestapo came to the Winters' house and could not find Ernst Karl, they took his son, Ernst Florian, to the police station. Ernst Florian's mother, Margarete, managed to get him released on the same day. A few days later, Margarete, her son Ernst Florian and his six siblings fled from Austria (his youngest sibling was born after the family moved to the United States).

=== Emigration to America ===
Via Switzerland, France, and England, the Winters emigrated to New York City in October 1939. They were one of the first non-Jewish emigrant families. Because there were no Austrian clubs in New York, many Austrian immigrants met in the Winters' house almost every Sunday. At the beginning of 1939, Ernst Karl Winter founded the Austrian American Center in New York, which was the first non-party national committee. This committee regularly organised demonstrations and marches and released weekly publications. There were almost no juveniles under the emigrants, nevertheless Ernst Florian Winter was voted as the leader. A few dozen juveniles regularly celebrated parades on Fifth Avenue. Together with his father, Ernst Florian met U.S. vice president Henry Wallace.

Winter did not join the "Österreichische Bataillon" initiated by Otto von Habsburg, because he had his skiing instructor exam. As a member of the "Ski Patrol System" he received a letter from the U.S. minister of war, who planned to set up a mountain division. On his 18th birthday, he joined the U.S. Army, though he wrote on his application form: "volunteer to join for the liberation of my home country Austria, but I am not willing to kill." The main reason of his strict attitude was that he had seen pictures of the Nazi concentration camps at his father's publishing house, which weighed heavily on him. In 1943, Winter gained American citizenship, and in 1944 he earned a degree from the University of Michigan.

=== Liberation of the homeland ===
Winter took part in the invasion of Normandy. He was the first Austro-American who marched into the Innviertel on 4 May 1945 with the 86th division of the 3rd U.S. Army at Burghausen, where he stayed at the Brauerei Schnaitl.

On orders from Baron Georg Ludwig von Trapp, Winter had a look at a mansion in Aigen that was the summer residence of Reichsführer-SS Heinrich Himmler. There he discovered that the house chapel had a swastika carved on the altar. A few weeks after the liberation, Winter had to leave his homeland again. His division went to Japan, where they had similar duties.

=== Academic studies and doctrine ===
After Winter had returned to the U.S., he graduated with a degree in social science from Columbia College. Studies in political science and international relations at Columbia University followed. He finished his Master of Arts degree in 1951. His topic was "Comparative analyses of the Renner-regime 1918 and 1945". He finished his Ph.D. in 1954; his dissertation topic was "Austrian agriculture between 1918 and 1945."

Winter began his academic career as professor of history and political science at Iona College in New Rochelle, New York. He also served as a visiting professor at the Fletcher School of Law and Diplomacy, Princeton University, Georgetown University, and Indiana University.

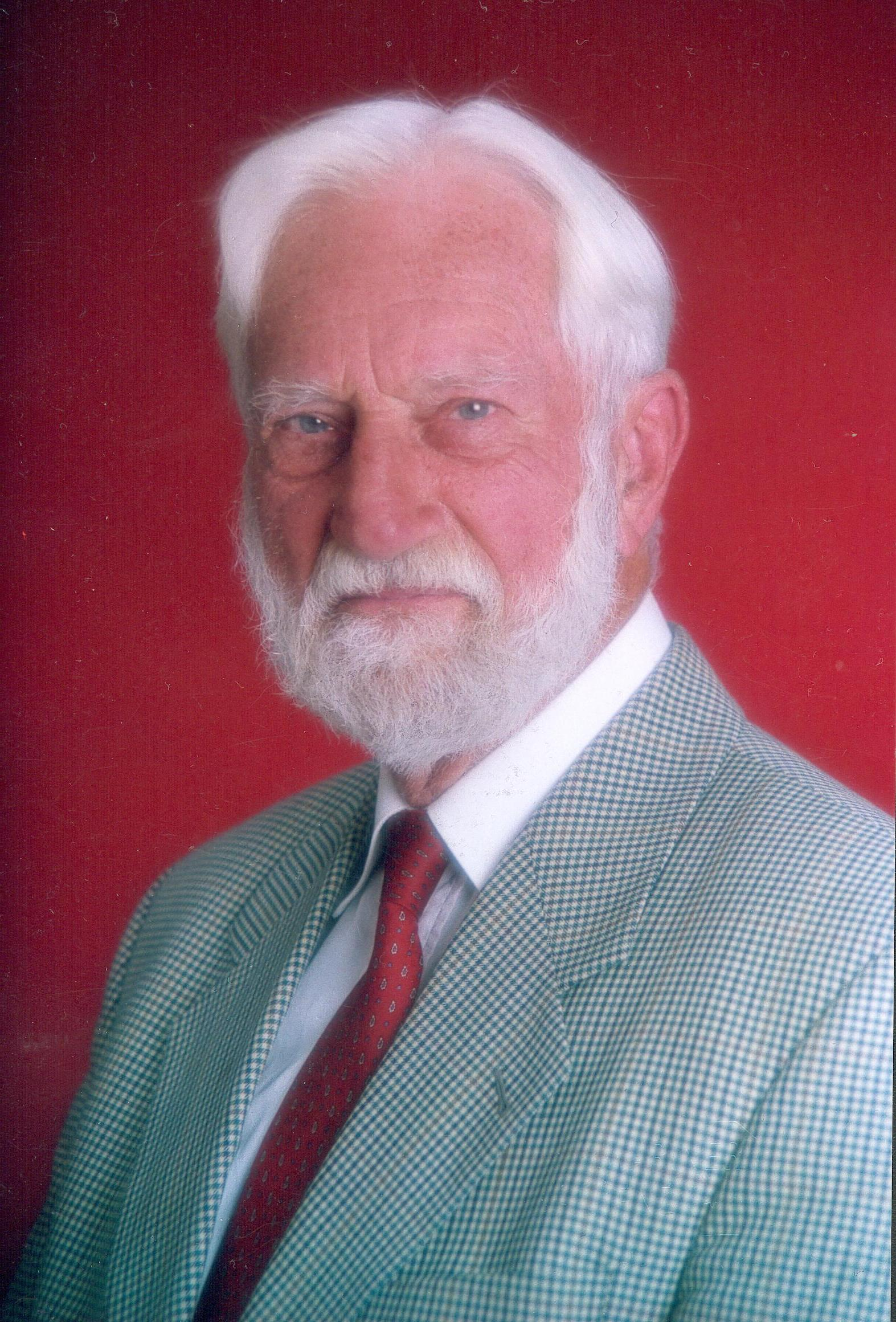
Winter in 1999

In 1960, he returned to Austria to establish the field of study of political science. In 1964, he was chosen by the state secretary Bruno Kreisky to be the foundation director of the Diplomatic University of Vienna, where he served as a professor for decades. He also began work as an assistant at the Institute for Higher Studies (IHS) at its founding in 1963. He was the director of the IHS between 1967 and 1968.

He was married to Johanna von Trapp (1919–1994), the daughter of Georg Ludwig von Trapp and Agathe Whitehead. They were married from 1948 to 1994 and had seven children: Ernst Florian (1949–1969), Johanna, Florian, Notburga, Agathe, Hemma, and Severin. From 1964 to 1977 they lived together in Schloss Eichbüchel in Katzelsdorf. There they hosted the "Eichbüchler-Gespräche" and Austria seminars for ten years; visiting professors included Oskar Morgenstern, Paul Lazarsfeld, Friedrich Heer, and Henry Kissinger.

=== Diplomatic career ===
Between 1968 and 1970, Winter was director of social science at UNESCO in Paris. At the same time, he was chief negotiator between the U.S. and the People's Republic of China. Winter was member of the UN commission of the United States for the development of China strategies between 1970 and 1972. In January 1970 Henry Kissinger sent him to ask Chinese-Canadian academic and political activist Paul Lin to relay a confidential message to Zhou Enlai conveying Kissinger’s desire to meet Chinese leaders in view of a visit by President Nixon to China. In January 1972, he was the first American invited by Chinese prime minister Zhou Enlai to a two-month stay at the institute for foreign politics in China. In 1974, as part of UNEP-FAO, Winter was chairman of the first mission of the UN agency in China. In the following year, he led the China Mission of UNEP-WHO.

== Personal engagement ==
=== Agriculture in Kosovo ===
Starting in the 1990s, Winter cultivated an organic self-sustaining area in the Defereggental in eastern Tyrol. He participated in an environment program of the United Nations called "Agriculture in Kosovo"; as part of that program, he taught at the University of Business and Technology in Pristina.

=== Austrian service abroad ===
Since 2009 Winter was the chairman of the international council of the Austrian Service Abroad.

== Awards ==
- On 3 May 2008, Winter was given the Egon Ranshofen-Wertheimer Award in Braunau-am-Inn. Austrian expatriates receive this prize for dedication to Austria. Winter shared this award with the Trapp Family and the actor Dietmar Schönherr.
- Federal president Heinz Fischer awarded Winter on 10 August 2010 the Austrian Cross of Honour for Science and Art, 1st class
- On 10 October 2010 in Pfaffstätten, Winter (with Mirie Rushani) was awarded the Weltmenschpreis 2010.
- In 2012, he was given a Decoration for Services to the Liberation of Austria
