= Schang =

Schang is a surname. Notable people with the surname include:

- David Schang, member of a family of 16th-century Scottish carpenters
- Wally Schang (1889-1965), Major League Baseball catcher
- Frederick Christian Schang (1893-1971), Talent agent and former president of Columbia Arts Management
- Bobby Schang (1886-1966), Pittsburgh Pirates catcher
