= Hede von Trapp =

Austrian artist and writer (1877–1947)

- Born: 18 November 1877; Pula, Austria-Hungary
- Died: 29 December 1947 (aged 70); Korneuburg, Austria
- Known for: Poetry; Graphic design Painting
- Movement: Art Nouveau

Hede von Trapp (18 November 1877 – 29 December 1947) was an Austrian poet, painter and graphic designer of the Art Nouveau movement.

== Biography ==
Trapp was born in Pula, Austria-Hungary, on 18 November 1877. She was the daughter of August von Trapp, who only a year earlier (1876) had been raised to Austrian knighthood. Her younger brother was the U-boat commander Georg Ritter von Trapp (1880–1947), father of the Trapp singing family portrayed in The Sound of Music. Hede Trapp worked as a writer and poet. She studied in the master class of the Berlin painter Erich Ludwig Stahl. From 1909, she started to illustrate her own books. In July 1911, she had an exhibition with 70 pen drawings and etchings in the Miethke Gallery in Vienna. In 1914, she participated from 1 February to 31 March at the International Exhibition in the Kunsthalle Bremen. She lived and worked in Korneuburg, where the Hede-von-Trapp-Straße is named after her.

Trapp died on 29 December 1947 in Korneuburg, Austria.
