= Maria Franziska von Trapp =

Member of Trapp Family Singers (1914–2014)

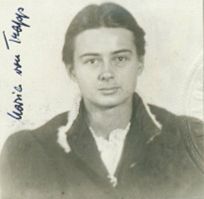
- Petition for Naturalization, 1948
- Born: Maria Agatha Franziska Gobertina von Trapp; 28 September 1914; Zell am See, Salzburg, Austria-Hungary
- Died: 18 February 2014 (aged 99); Stowe, Vermont, U.S.
- Resting place: Trapp Family Lodge
- Occupations: Singer and Catholic missionary
- Children: 1
- Parent(s): Georg von Trapp; Agathe Whitehead; Maria Augusta von Trapp (Stepmother)

Maria Agatha Franziska Gobertina 'Mitzi' von Trapp (28 September 1914 – 18 February 2014) was the second-oldest daughter of Georg von Trapp and his first wife, Agathe Whitehead von Trapp. She was a member of the Trapp Family Singers, whose lives inspired the musical and film The Sound of Music. She was portrayed by Heather Menzies as the character "Louisa". She died at age 99, and was the last surviving sibling portrayed in the film.

== Biography ==
She was born on 28 September 1914 in Zell am See, Salzburg, then part of Austria-Hungary.

Her siblings were Rupert von Trapp (1911–1992), Agathe von Trapp (1913–2010), Werner von Trapp (1915–2007), Hedwig von Trapp (1917–1972), Johanna von Trapp (1919–1994), and Martina von Trapp (1921–1951). Along with her six siblings, father, and stepmother, Maria Augusta von Trapp, she was part of the Trapp Family Singers, who inspired the 1959 Broadway musical and the 1965 Academy Award-winning Best Picture The Sound of Music. Von Trapp sang second soprano in the choir, together with her sister Martina von Trapp. The family fled Austria after the German annexation of Austria, fearing reprisals resulting from declining to sing at Hitler's birthday party and Georg von Trapp's refusal to accept a commission in Nazi Germany's Kriegsmarine.

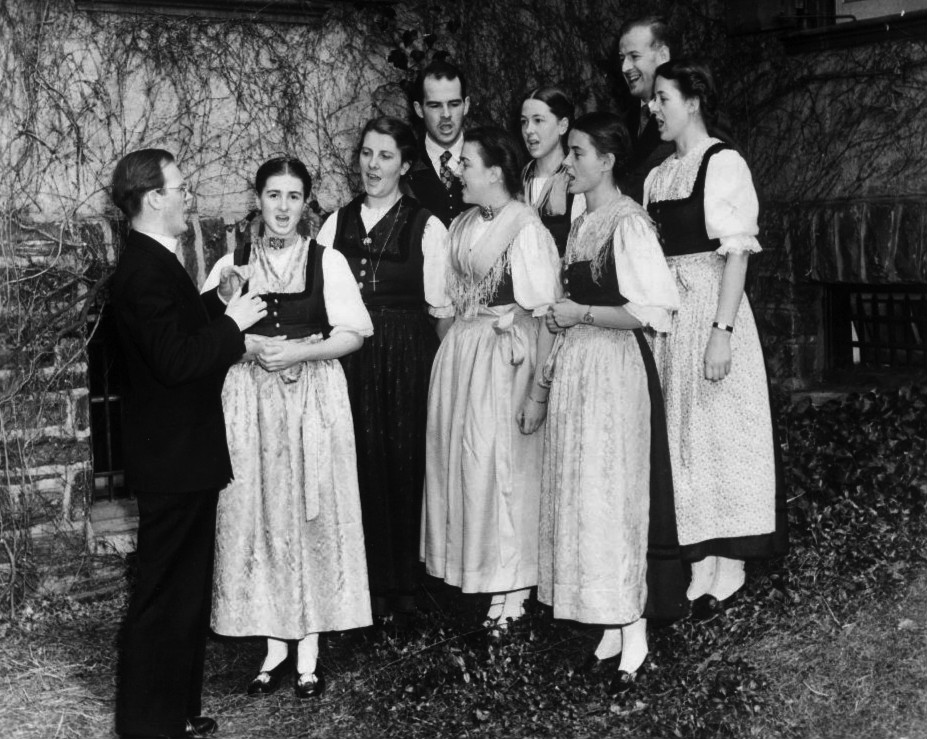
The Trapp family rehearsing before a concert, near Boston, 27 September 1941.

They emigrated to the United States in 1938, settled in Vermont in 1942, and performed throughout the country. Baron von Trapp died in 1947. Maria Franziska became a naturalized U.S. citizen in 1948 and lived at her family's lodge in Stowe, Vermont. The family continued to tour until their last concert on 26 January 1956, at which time Maria Franziska and her stepmother became lay missionaries in Papua New Guinea where Maria Franziska adopted a son, Kikuli Mwanukuzi.

From 22 July 2008 to 27 July 2008, she visited her childhood home in Salzburg/Aigen and her birthplace in Zell am See. Accompanying her were her half-brother Johannes and her sister-in-law Erika (Werner's widow). During their visit, the group met with Ernst Florian Winter, the husband of her sister Johanna (1919–1994).

She was the last survivor of the seven original von Trapp children. Of the three half-siblings from her father's second marriage, whose names are Rosmarie von Trapp (1929–2022), Eleonore von Trapp (1931–2021), and Johannes von Trapp (born 1939), Johannes von Trapp is still alive. None of those three were featured in The Sound of Music.

Maria Franziska von Trapp died on Tuesday, 18 February 2014, in Stowe, Vermont, at the age of 99.
