= The Trapp Family =

- German theatrical release poster
- Directed by: Wolfgang Liebeneiner
- Screenplay by: George Hurdalek; Herbert Reinecker
- Story by: Maria von Trapp
- Based on: The Story of the Trapp Family Singers by Maria von Trapp
- Produced by: Ilse Kubaschewski
- Starring: Ruth Leuwerik; Hans Holt; Maria Holst
- Cinematography: Werner Krien
- Edited by: Margot von Schlieffen
- Music by: Franz Grothe
- Production company: Divina-Film
- Distributed by: Gloria Film (West Germany); 20th Century Fox (United States)
- Release dates: October 9, 1956 (West Germany); April 19, 1961 (United States)
- Running time: 100 minutes
- Country: West Germany
- Language: German
- Box office: 6 million DM (Germany) $800,000 (US)

The Trapp Family (German: Die Trapp-Familie) is a 1956 West German comedy drama film about the real-life Austrian musical family of that name directed by Wolfgang Liebeneiner and starring Ruth Leuwerik, Hans Holt, and Maria Holst. Based on Maria von Trapp's 1949 memoir, The Story of the Trapp Family Singers, the film is about a Benedictine postulant sent to care for the unruly children of a wealthy baron, who falls in love with and marries the young woman. Through her caring influence, the family becomes a famous singing group. When the baron is pressured to join Hitler's navy, the family escapes to the United States, where they establish themselves as singers.

The Trapp Family became one of the most successful German films of the 1950s and was the inspiration for the even more fictionalized 1959 Broadway musical The Sound of Music, and its highly successful 1965 film version. The film had one sequel, The Trapp Family in America (1958).

== Plot ==
At Nonnberg Abbey in the Federal State of Austria in the 1930s, a postulant named Maria (Ruth Leuwerik) is sent by her abbess to the estate of a widowed Austro-Hungarian Navy war hero, Baron von Trapp (Hans Holt), to look after his seven unruly children. The baron is a stern disciplinarian and runs his household like a World War I U-boat. When Maria arrives, she encourages the children to play games like other kids, and teaches them how to sing. When the baron discovers how Maria is ignoring his orders, he sends her back to the convent. Later, when he hears his children singing songs they've learned from Maria, his feelings for her change. Gradually, the baron falls in love with the young woman and proposes marriage.

After obtaining permission to marry from the abbess, Maria becomes the Baroness von Trapp. After the Captain loses his fortune, a local chaplain, Franz Wasner (Josef Meinrad), who provides musical education to the singers, encourages Maria and the children to sing for charity, and soon they develop a large following. After the Anschluss, the baron, unwilling to live under the Nazi regime, has the family flee to the United States, where they continue performing. But their troubles are far from over when a naïve Maria tells the immigration inspector they want to stay forever, after he asks how long they will be visiting the country.

== Cast ==
- Ruth Leuwerik as Baroness Maria von Trapp
- Hans Holt as Baron Georg von Trapp
- Maria Holst as Princess Yvonne
- Josef Meinrad as Franz Wasner
- Friedrich Domin as Rudi Gruber, the banker
- Hilde von Stolz as Baroness Mathilde
- Agnes Windeck as abbess
- Gretl Theimer as cook
- Liesl Karlstadt as Raphaela
- Karl Ehmann as a servant
- Hans Schumm as Petroff
- Joseph Offenbach as Samish
- Peter Capell as Ellis Island officer
- Michael Ande as Werner von Trapp
- Knut Mahlke as Rupert von Trapp
- Ursula Wolff as Agathe von Trapp
- Angelika Werth as Hedwig von Trapp
- Monika Wolf as Maria F. von Trapp
- Ursula Ettrich as Rosemarie von Trapp
- Monika Ettrich as Martina von Trapp

== Production ==
The film is based on Maria von Trapp's memoir, The Story of the Trapp Family Singers, written in 1948 to help promote her family's singing group following the death of her husband, Captain von Trapp, in 1947. Hollywood producers expressed immediate interest in purchasing the title only, but Maria refused, wanting her entire story to be told. In 1956, German producer Wolfgang Liebeneiner offered her $10,000 (equal to $118,421 today for the complete rights to her story. Following her lawyer's advice, she asked for a share of the film profits, but was told that German law prohibited a German film company from paying royalties to non-German citizens — Maria was an American citizen by then. She signed away the rights to her story without confirming that such a law existed (it did not). The same agent that misled her offered her a single cash payment if she would accept $9,000, which she did.

Liebeneiner brought in George Hurdalek and Herbert Reinecker to write the screenplay, and Franz Grothe to supervise the soundtrack, which included traditional Austrian folk songs. The movie was filmed on location in Salzburg, Austria, and Murnau am Staffelsee in Bavaria, West Germany.

== Release ==
The Trapp Family was released in West Germany on October 9, 1956, by Gloria Film and became a major success. Two years later, Liebeneiner directed a sequel, The Trapp Family in America, and the two films soon became the most successful films in West Germany during the post-war years. Their success extended throughout Europe and South America.

== Critical response ==
In his review of the 1961 United States version for The New York Times, Howard Thompson gave the film a positive review, calling it "genteel, tuneful and frankly sentimental". According to Thompson, the film "steers an undramatic, but disarming, course", with "friendly" acting and "pretty" cinematography. The central attraction for Thompson, however, is the traditional folk music:

As happens nightly on Broadway, the music really carries the film. Instead of Rodgers and Hammerstein, we now hear genuine folk tunes, light European favorites and the classics. The flavor of these genuinely sweet young voices (dubbed, we assume) is as distinct and clear as an Alpine bell.

Thompson concludes, "The children will love it. Nobody, certainly, will resent such a happy family, content to love one another and, thank heaven, to sing."

== Adaptations ==
In 1956, Paramount Pictures purchased the United States film rights, intending to produce an English-language version with Audrey Hepburn as Maria. The studio eventually dropped its option, but one of its directors, Vincent Donehue, proposed the story as a stage musical for Mary Martin. Producers Richard Halliday and Leland Heyward secured the rights and hired playwrights Howard Lindsay and Russel Crouse, who had won a Pulitzer Prize for State of the Union. They approached Richard Rodgers and Oscar Hammerstein to compose one song for the musical, but the composers felt the two styles—traditional Austrian folk songs and their composition—would not work, and offered to write a new score for the entire production. The Sound of Music opened on November 16, 1959, at the Lunt-Fontanne Theatre in New York City and ran on Broadway for 1,443 performances, winning six Tony Awards, including Best Musical.

In June 1960, 20th Century Fox purchased the film rights to the Broadway musical for $1.25 million (equal to $13,600,000 today) against 10% of the gross, and at that time, also purchased the rights to the two German films for distribution in the United States. 20th Century Fox combined the two German films, Die Trapp-Familie and Die Trapp-Familie in Amerika, hired Lee Kresel to dub the films in English, and released them as a single 106-minute film titled The Trapp Family on April 19, 1961.

Fox released the better-known film version of the Rodgers and Hammerstein play, starring Julie Andrews, on March 2, 1965.
