= Agathe von Trapp =

Austrian noblewoman and singer (1913–2010)

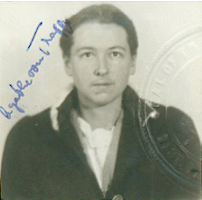
- Agathe in 1948
- Born: Agathe Johanna Erwina Gobertina von Trapp; 12 March 1913; Pola, Istria, Austria-Hungary (present-day Pula, Croatia)
- Died: 28 December 2010 (aged 97); Towson, Maryland, U.S.
- Occupations: Singer, author, teacher
- Parent(s): Georg von Trapp; Agathe Whitehead

Agathe Johanna Erwina Gobertina von Trapp (12 March 1913 – 28 December 2010) was the eldest daughter of Georg von Trapp with his first wife, Agathe Whitehead von Trapp. She was also a member of the Trapp Family Singers, whose lives were the inspiration for the 1959 musical play and 1965 film The Sound of Music. She was portrayed as the character "Liesl".

== Childhood ==
Agathe was born on 12 March 1913 in Pola, Istria, then part of the Austro-Hungarian Empire (present-day Pula, Croatia). She was the eldest daughter and the second of ten children born to Georg von Trapp. The first seven of these were born to his first wife, Agathe Whitehead, while the youngest three - Rosmarie, Eleonore, and Johannes, half-siblings to the elder seven - were born to Georg's second wife, Maria Augusta Kutschera. Agathe von Trapp spent her early years, throughout World War I and after, near Zell am See, Austria.

After the war, Agathe moved with her family to a house called "the Martinschlossl", in Klosterneuburg, a half hour train ride from Vienna, near the Danube. She and her family finally settled near Salzburg, in the town of Aigen in 1925. Agathe was tutored by a governess at home until age 11, when she started attending a local school. Agathe was surrounded by music at an early age, and her father began teaching her guitar when she was in her early teens. Agathe's mother, Agathe Whitehead von Trapp, died of scarlet fever in 1922, when Agathe was almost 10 years old. Her father remarried six years later, to Maria Augusta Kutschera, in November 1927.

== Middle history and singing career ==
After graduating from high school, Agathe tutored briefly, and then pursued her loves of painting, languages, and sewing. In the evenings, Agathe sang with her family. Agathe sang first soprano with her sister Johanna. While they did this just for enjoyment at first, their hobby turned into a career for the von Trapps after much of their money was lost in the global depression that followed the 1929 Wall Street Crash. Those who had heard them sing encouraged them to do more concerts. After winning a competition for folk singers at the 1936 Salzburg Festival, the von Trapps were asked to sing a half-hour radio program, which resulted in singing before Austria's chancellor, Kurt von Schuschnigg.

In 1937, after singing in Vienna twice, and singing at the 1937 Salzburg Festival, Agathe toured Europe going to France, Belgium, the Netherlands, Denmark, Sweden, England, and Norway with her family calling themselves the Salzburg Chamber Choir Trapp, or Chamber Choir Trapp. Early in 1938 the family toured Italy.

On the eve of Agathe's 25th birthday, 11 March 1938, Austria was invaded by Germany. Her family had never liked or supported Hitler or the way the Nazi party functioned. They were devoted to Austria. Agathe sewed black aprons for her family, and the whole family wore the clothes of mourning for Austria. While they stayed a little while longer, they did not care for what the new government was doing. Agathe's father decided not to accept the offer of a place in Nazi Germany's Kriegsmarine. The whole family refused the request to sing at the birthday party of Adolf Hitler, and Agathe's older brother, Rupert von Trapp, a doctor, declined the offer to work in Nazi hospitals.

Their house did not fly any Nazi flags from the windows, except in windows of rooms that were leased to boarders. There was no danger in these refusals, as border rearrangements that had been made after World War I made Agathe and her family Italian citizens and Germans could not arrest Italians at that time. The von Trapps decided to sign a singing contract with Charles Wagner in the United States, leave Austria for Italy, and, from there, head to the United States via London. The family merely rented out their house and walked to the train station behind their property. Agathe arrived in the U.S. in October 1938.

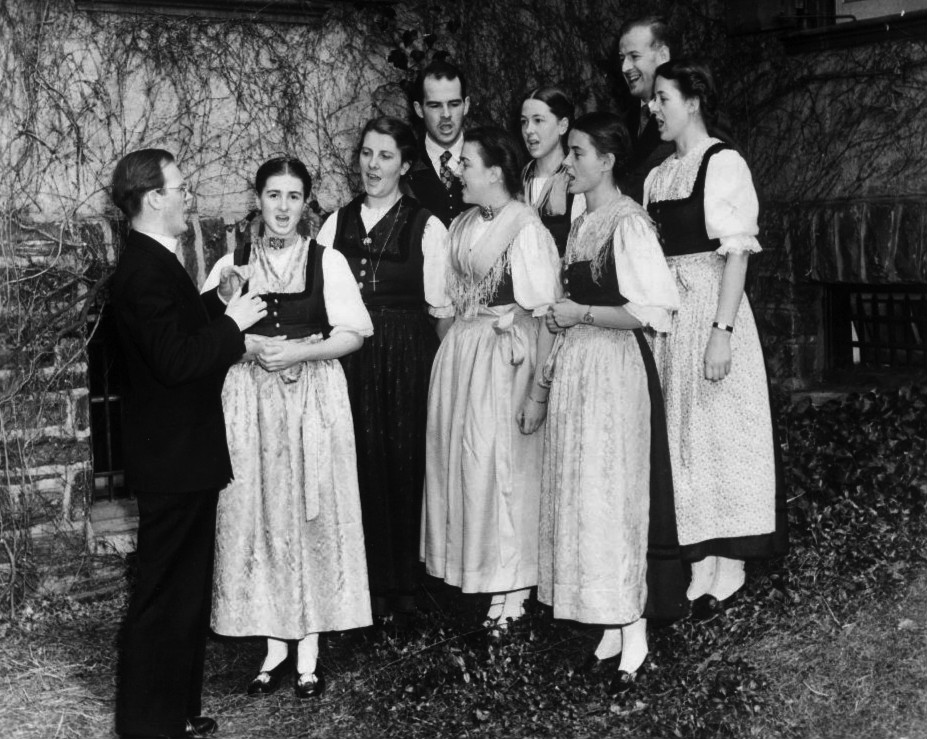
The Trapp family rehearsing before a concert, near Boston, 27 September 1941.

After touring the United States singing as the von Trapp Family Choir, Agathe returned to Europe when her and her family's visas expired. They did a tour in Scandinavia and received standing ovations and glowing reports. Agathe returned to the United States in October 1939, and received the unwanted publicity of being detained on Ellis Island with her family for several days. Concert tours resumed after this incident. In 1940, the von Trapps signed on with Columbia Concerts, Inc., with Freddy Schang as their manager. At his request, the family changed their stage name to The Trapp Family Singers. In 1942, Agathe settled down with her family on a farm in Vermont, and continued to perform throughout the country. Agathe applied for citizenship in 1944.

The Trapp Family Singers made two long tours of the United States each year, singing in all forty-eight states and Hawaii. She toured Canada, South America, Australia, Austria, New Zealand, the Fiji Islands, Hawaii, and Europe. On one European tour, they sang for Pope Pius XII in a general audience in the Vatican. Unlike some of her siblings, Agathe sang with the von Trapp Family Singers until they sang their last concert on 26 January 1956. Agathe was 43 years old.

== Solo career and retirement ==
In 1956, Agathe left home to pursue a career with a friend, Mary Louise Kane, starting a kindergarten in Stowe, Vermont. In 1958, they moved to Maryland and started another kindergarten there, at the Sacred Heart Parish in Glyndon, Maryland. Agathe and Mary Louise Kane worked together for 37 years. In 1993, they both retired. Agathe continued to be busy in retirement. She still painted, and one of her paintings is displayed at the Austrian Embassy in Washington, D.C.

Throughout her life, she made many watercolor paintings and crayon etchings, most of which she sold. Her artwork illustrates a cookbook of family recipes and “The Trapp Family Book of Christmas Songs”, written by Father Franz Wasner, the priest and family friend who had directed the Trapp Family Singers. She decorated wooden bowls and was good at carpentry, making some of her own furniture for her house.

She wrote her memoir, Agathe von Trapp: Memories Before and After The Sound of Music, which chronicled the true story behind the film and includes dozens of her hand-drawn maps, portraits, and other illustrations. It also recounts her personal memories of her parents and their lives. She started writing the book in the 1980s by traveling to Europe to research family history, sketch maps, and collect photographs. She self-published the book with Publish America, LLLP in 2003 at age 91.

The book was republished in 2010 by Harper Paperback. She played guitar and piano into her retirement. She sang around the house until she was about 94 years old. The film The von Trapp Family: A Life of Music (2015), starring Eliza Bennett and Rosemary Harris as younger and older Agathe, respectively, was based on this book.

== Death ==
Agathe died on 28 December 2010, aged 97, at the Gilchrist Hospice Care in Towson, Maryland after suffering congestive heart failure.

== Discography ==
=== Recordings of the Trapp Family Singers ===
- One Voice (July 17, 2007)
- Original Trapp Family Singers (4 August 2009)
- Christmas with the Trapp Family Singers (12 October 2004)
- At Home with the Trapp Family Singers: An Evening of Folksongs (13 September 2005)
- Christmas with the Trapp Family Singers LP Decca (1955)

== Publications ==
- Memories Before & After The Sound of Music (2003)

== See also ==
- The Story of the Trapp Family Singers (1949 book by Maria von Trapp)
- The von Trapp Family: A Life of Music (2015 film based on Agathe's autobiography)
