= Trapp Family Lodge =

Resort located in Stowe, Vermont, US

von Trapp Family Lodge & Resort

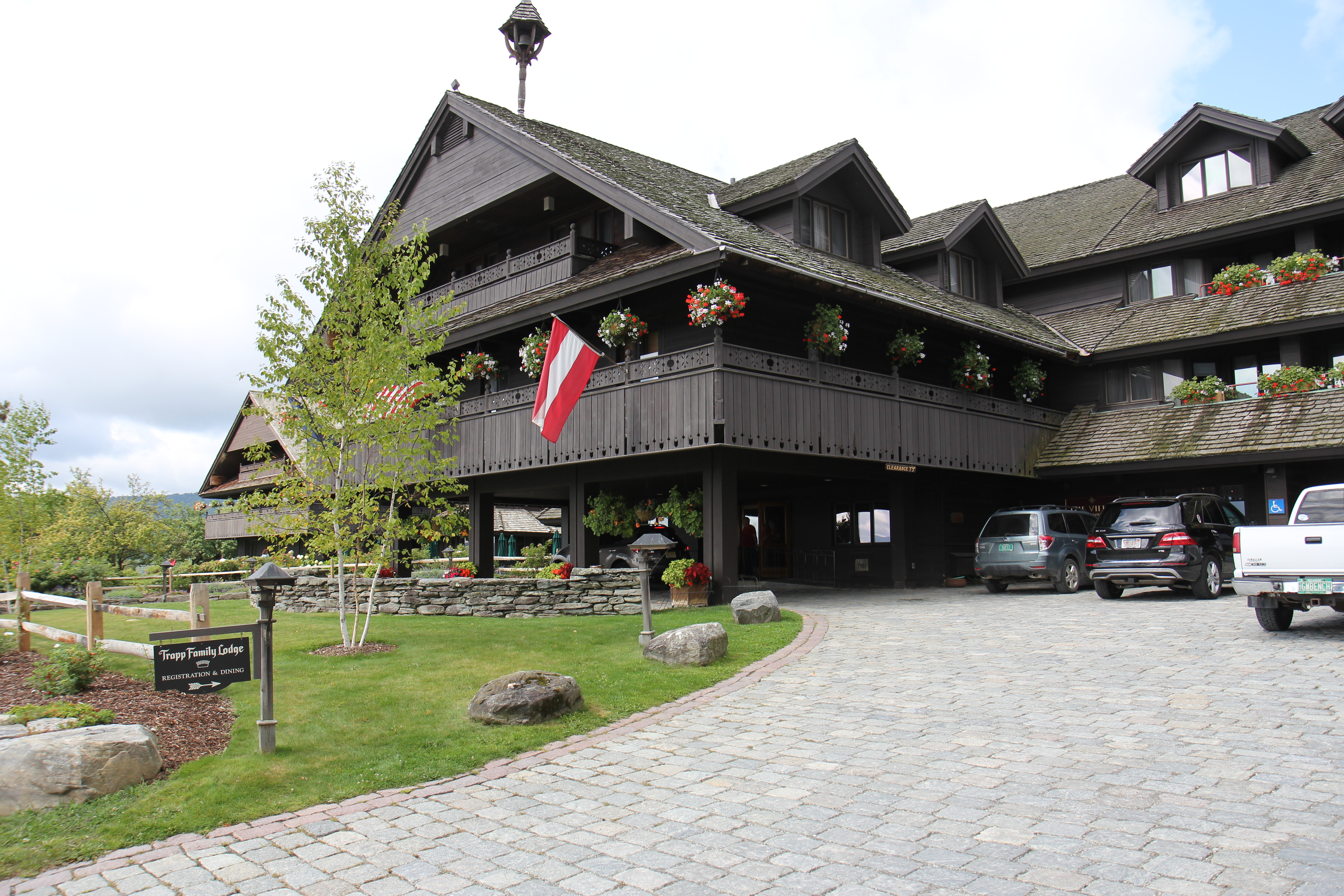
- Main entrance in 2014
- Former names: Cor Unum; Trapp Family Lodge

General information
- Location: Stowe, Vermont, U.S., 700 Trapp Hill Road
- Coordinates: 44.465452488°N 72.74522805°W
- Opening: 1950 (original); December 17, 1983 (rebuild)
- Destroyed: December 20, 1980 (original)
- Owner: Trapp Family

Technical details
- Floor count: 4

Other information
- Number of rooms: 96 (main inn)
- Number of restaurants: 4
- Parking: yes

Website
- www.vontrappresort.com

The von Trapp Family Lodge & Resort, formerly the Trapp Family Lodge, is a 2,600-acre (4.1 mi^{2}; 11 km^{2}) resort located in Stowe, Vermont. It was also formerly known as Cor Unum (Latin for "One Heart").

== Background ==
The Trapp family was largely fictionalized in the 1959 musical The Sound of Music, which was loosely based on the 1949 book The Story of the Trapp Family Singers by Maria von Trapp. The musical was adapted for the 1965 film The Sound of Music, which won five Academy Awards including Best Picture. Maria and her husband, Baron Georg von Trapp, had left Austria shortly after its annexation by Nazi Germany in 1938 and settled with their family in Vermont in 1942. Baron von Trapp died in 1947.

== History ==
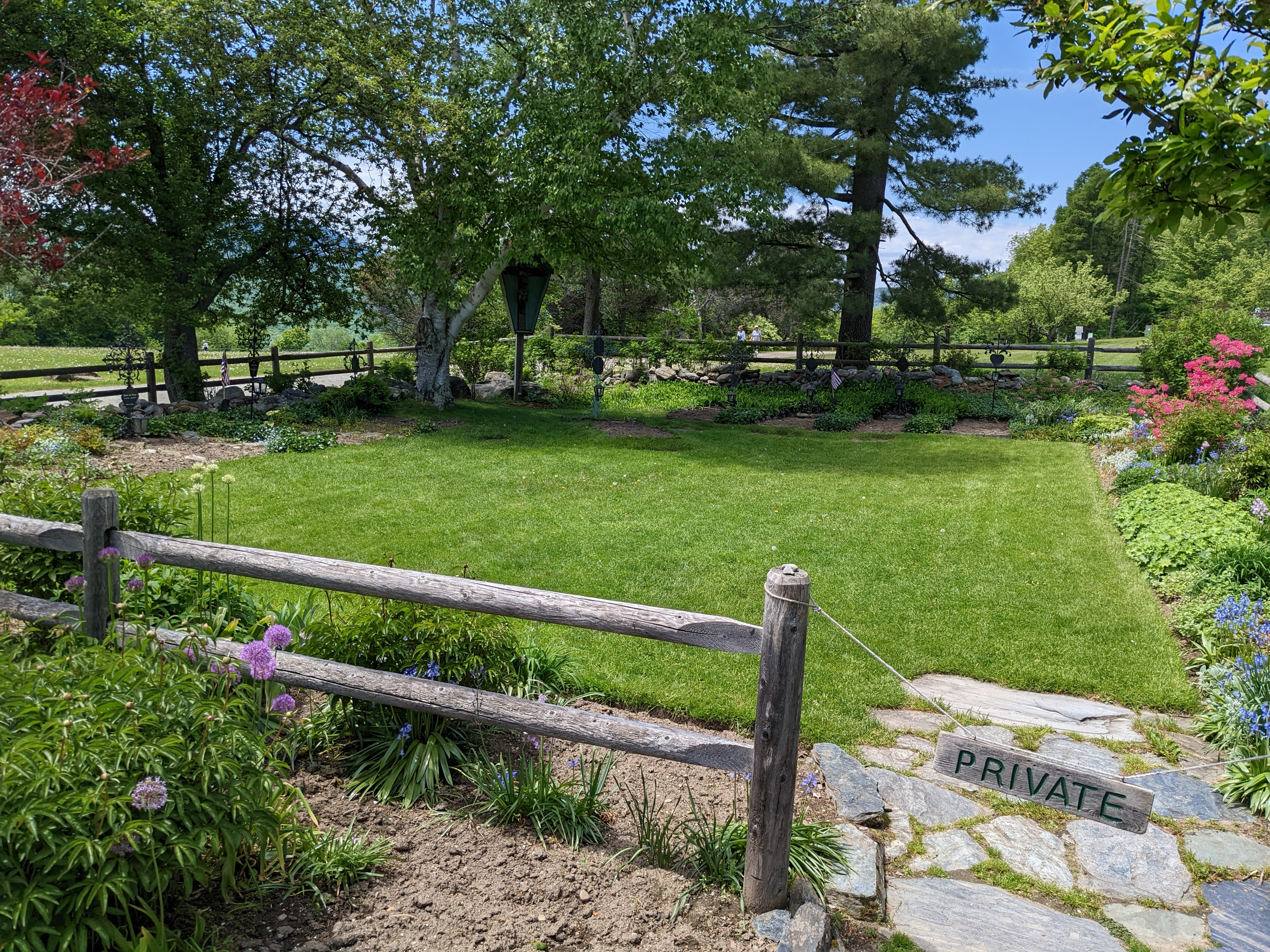
The family cemetery in 2022; Maria's grave is at the center.

In 1950, the family began operating their expanded home as a 27-room ski lodge. The ski lodge was later expanded in 1968 to fit 20 more rooms.

The facility was destroyed by fire on December 20, 1980, forcing 45 people to flee in their nightclothes, including Baroness von Trapp. The body of a guest was found later in the rubble. A new Austrian-style lodge with 73 rooms was opened in December 1983.

After the death of Maria von Trapp in 1987, 32 family members shared ownership of the lodge. Johannes von Trapp, her youngest child, served as President of the corporation. Family members were concerned about Johannes' unauthorized acquisition of a ranch in Montana with corporate funds, and sought to sell their shares. Departing family members were displeased with the share price proposed and fought back with legal proceedings about the amount to be paid to them in exchange for their shares; the lawsuit reached the Vermont Supreme Court. The court awarded an additional $2.2 million, plus interest, to the family members who filed the lawsuit.

As of 2007, the main lodge had 96 rooms and suites; the facility also featured "100 timeshare guesthouses and 14 fractional-ownership villas".

In February 2025, the facility's name was changed from Trapp Family Lodge to von Trapp Family Lodge & Resort.

As of March 2025, leadership of the facility includes Kristina von Trapp Frame, director and executive vice president; Walter Frame, director and chief operating officer; and Kyle Cocchi, hotel director. Kristina is the daughter of Johannes von Trapp.

== Facilities ==
The lodge offers cross country skiing and mountain biking trails, fitness center, tennis courts, pools, and wagon and sleigh rides. The lodge houses a restaurant, lounge, and gift shop. As a working farm, they produce their own maple syrup, raise Scottish Highland cattle, chickens, pigs, and grow their own vegetables for use in their restaurants.

The meadow at the lodge was one of the principal sites for the annual Vermont Mozart Festival.

=== Cross-country skiing ===
During the winter of 1968–69, Johannes von Trapp, then president of Trapp Family Lodge Inc., came up with an idea to start cross-country skiing trails at the lodge. As of 2008, there were 67 kilometres (42 mi) of groomed trails and 100 kilometres (62 mi) of un-groomed trails throughout the property.

=== von Trapp Brewing ===
In 2010, the lodge began to brew beer, initially under the name Trapp Lager. Now named von Trapp Brewing, it annually produces approximately 60,000 US gallons (230,000 L; 50,000 imp gal) of traditional German- and Austrian-style lagers. In 2016, the von Trapp Bierhall opened down the hill from the Lodge, serving food and beverages.

== Family cemetery ==
A cemetery in the grounds of the lodge contains the graves of several family members, including Maria and Georg.
