= Frederick Christian Schang =

Frederick Christian Schang, Jr. (December 15, 1893 – August 26, 1990) was a talent agent and later president of Columbia Artists Management.

== Biography ==
He was born on December 15, 1893, and attended the Columbia School of Journalism. After graduation he was a reporter for the New-York Tribune. He then worked for the Metropolitan Music Bureau. In 1948 he was elected president of Columbia Artists Management.

Schang published several books featuring visiting cards of artists, musicians and celebrities such as "Visiting Cards of the Painters," published by Wittenborn Art Books in 1983.

Schang died in Delray Beach, Florida, on August 26, 1990.

== See also ==
- Trapp Family
