= Margot von Schlieffen =

German film editor (1921–2014)

- Born: 26 May 1921
- Died: 28 February 2014 (aged 92)
- Occupation: Film editor
- Years active: 1952–1995 (film)

Margot von Schlieffen (26 May 1921 – 28 February 2014) was a German film editor. She worked on thirty five films and television series between 1952 and 1995.

== Selected filmography ==
- The White Horse Inn (1952)
- The Last Waltz (1953)
- As Long as There Are Pretty Girls (1955)
- Operation Sleeping Bag (1955)
- Goodbye, Franziska (1957)
- The Trapp Family in America (1958)
- Taiga (1958)
- Jacqueline (1959)
- You Don't Shoot at Angels (1960)
- Dead Woman from Beverly Hills (1964)
- How to Seduce a Playboy (1966)

== Bibliography ==
- Crittenden, Roger. Fine Cuts: The Art of European Film Editing. Taylor & Francis, 2012.
