= The Trapp Family in America =

1958 film

- German theatrical release poster
- Directed by: Wolfgang Liebeneiner
- Screenplay by: Herbert Reinecker
- Based on: The Story of the Trapp Family Singers by Maria von Trapp
- Produced by: Heinz Abel; Ilse Kubaschewski; Utz Utermann
- Starring: Ruth Leuwerik; Hans Holt; Josef Meinrad; Adrienne Gessner
- Cinematography: Werner Krien
- Edited by: Margot von Schlieffen
- Music by: Franz Grothe
- Production company: Divina-Film
- Distributed by: Gloria Film
- Release date: October 17, 1958 (West Germany)
- Running time: 103 minutes
- Country: West Germany
- Language: German
- Budget: $2,000,000 (Deutsch Marks) or German Marks now European €

The Trapp Family in America (German: Die Trapp-Familie in Amerika) is a 1958 West German comedy drama film about the real-life Austrian musical Trapp Family directed by Wolfgang Liebeneiner and starring Ruth Leuwerik, Hans Holt, and Josef Meinrad. It is a sequel to the 1956 film The Trapp Family. It was shot at the Bavaria Studios in Munich. The film's sets were designed by the art director Robert Herlth.

== Plot ==
The von Trapps have left Austria and are now in the United States. But the Land of Unlimited Possibilities turns out to be anything but for our hapless heroes. Though the American public has demonstrated countless times, that they'll pay anything to hear German folk songs and other pop songs, the von Trapps on the verge of being penniless and suicidal, thanks to Father Wasner, who's determined to teach Americans to appreciate great church music ... no matter how much his "cultural mission" pushes the von Trapps to starvation. Only the insistence of paying patrons that they drop the holy roller music and the guffaws of the audience abandoning their shows finally convinces Maria, that it's time to start entertaining the paying public and give Palestrina a rest. Eventually they receive critical acclaim and a large following for their music. Later, they purchase a farm in Stowe Vermont and decide to remain in America.

== Cast ==
- Ruth Leuwerik as Baroness von Trapp
- Hans Holt as Baron von Trapp
- Josef Meinrad as Dr. Franz Wasner
- Adrienne Gessner as Mrs. Hammerfield
- Michael Ande as Werner von Trapp
- Knut Mahlke as Rupert von Trapp
- Ursula Wolff as Agathe von Trapp
- Angelika Werth as Hedwig von Trapp
- Monika Wolf as Maria F. von Trapp
- Ursula Ettrich as Rosemarie von Trapp
- Monika Ettrich as Martina von Trapp
- Wolfgang Wahl as Patrick
- Daniela and Annette Edel as Baby Johannes
- Peter Esser as Mr. Hammerfield
- Till Klockow as Bronx-Lilly
- Holger Hagen as Mr, Harris
