= Johannes von Trapp =

American singer (born 1939)

- Born: January 17, 1939 (age 87); Philadelphia, Pennsylvania, U.S.
- Education: Dartmouth College; Yale University
- Occupation: Singer
- Spouse: Lynne Peterson (m. 1969)
- Children: 2
- Parents: Georg von Trapp (father); Maria von Trapp (mother)

Johannes von Trapp (born January 17, 1939) is an American singer and former member of the Trapp Family Singers, whose lives were the inspiration for the musical and movie The Sound of Music. The tenth and youngest child, he is the last surviving sibling of the von Trapp family.

== Biography ==
Johannes von Trapp was born in 1939 in Philadelphia while the family was on a concert tour. He was eight years old when his father Georg von Trapp died in 1947. His siblings are Rosmarie (1929–2022) and Eleonore (1931–2021). He graduated from prep school at the Canterbury School in Connecticut in 1956. Later that year, he, along with several other members of the extended family, went to New Guinea to do missionary work. He later joined the Vermont Army National Guard as a second lieutenant. He attended training as a medical officer at Fort Sam Houston, Texas, in 1967.

By 1969, he had graduated from Dartmouth College. He attended the Yale University's School of Forestry for his Master's degree. He returned to Stowe, Vermont, to help with the finances of the family business, the Trapp Family Lodge, and then became the manager of the resort. In 1977, he moved to British Columbia and later to a ranch in Montana. He eventually returned to manage the family business in Vermont.

In 1969, von Trapp married Lynne Peterson. They have two children. Johannes visited the Trapp Villa in Salzburg Aigen on 28 July 2008 with his half-sister Maria Franziska and Erika, the widow of his half-brother Werner.
