= Georg von Trapp =

Trapp family patriarch (1880–1947)

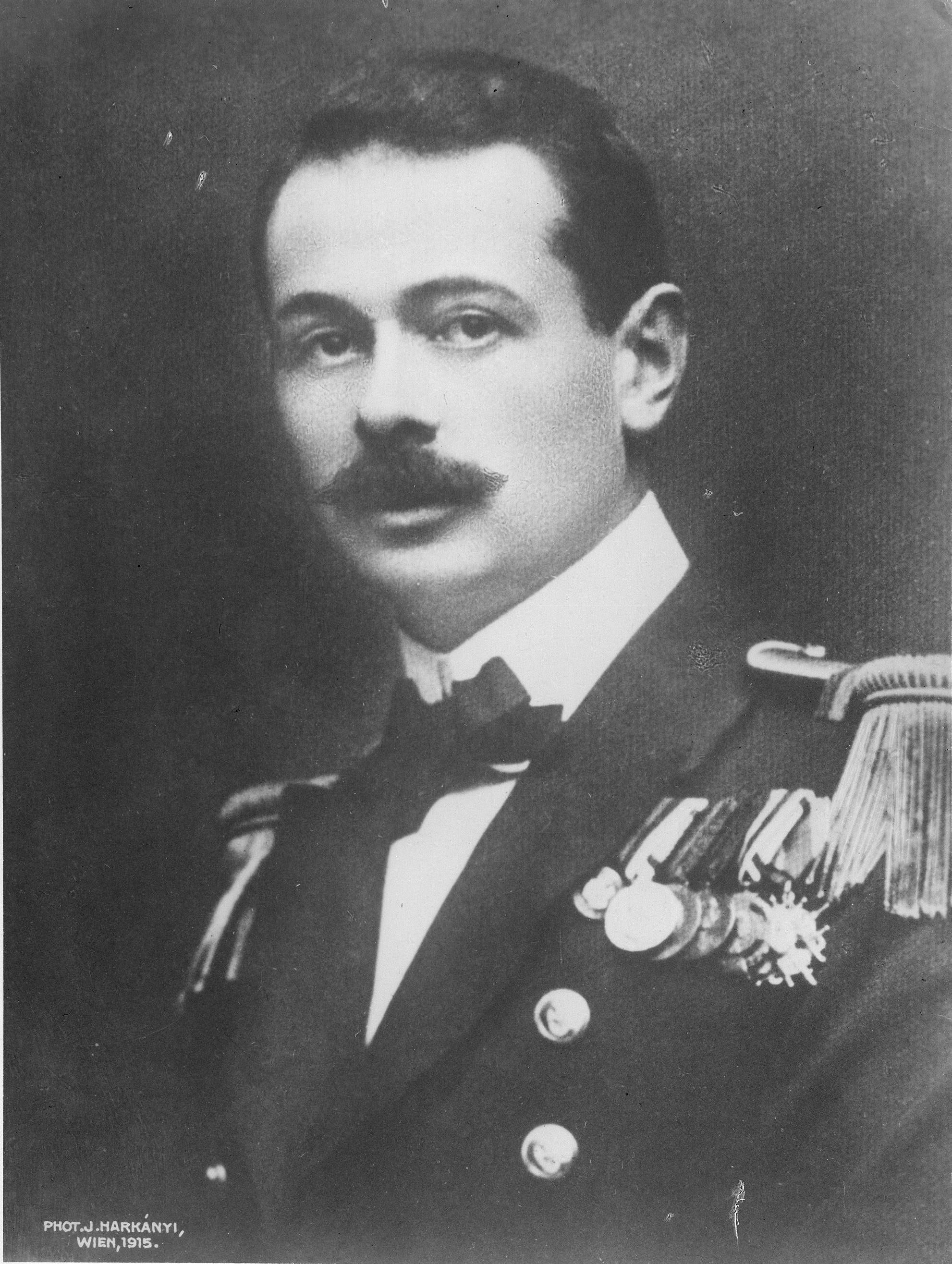
- Born: 4 April 1880; Zara, Kingdom of Dalmatia, Austria-Hungary (Zadar, Croatia)
- Died: 30 May 1947 (aged 67); Stowe, Vermont, U.S.
- Resting place: Trapp Family Cemetery, Trapp Family Lodge, Stowe, Vermont, U.S.
- Spouses: Agathe Whitehead (m. 1911; died 1922) Maria Augusta Kutschera (m. 1927)
- Children: 10, including Agathe, Maria Franziska, and Johannes
- Military career
- Allegiance: Austria-Hungary
- Branch: Austro-Hungarian Navy
- Service years: 1898–1918
- Rank: Korvettenkapitän (lieutenant-commander)
- Commands: SM U-6 (July 1910 – July 1913); Torpedo Boat 52 (1913–1914); SM U-5 (April–October 1915); SM U-14 (October 1915 – May 1918); Submarine base commander at Cattaro (May–November 1918)
- Conflicts: Boxer Rebellion; Battle of Taku Forts; World War I; Mediterranean Theatre
- Awards: Knight's Cross of the Military Order of Maria Theresa (1924)

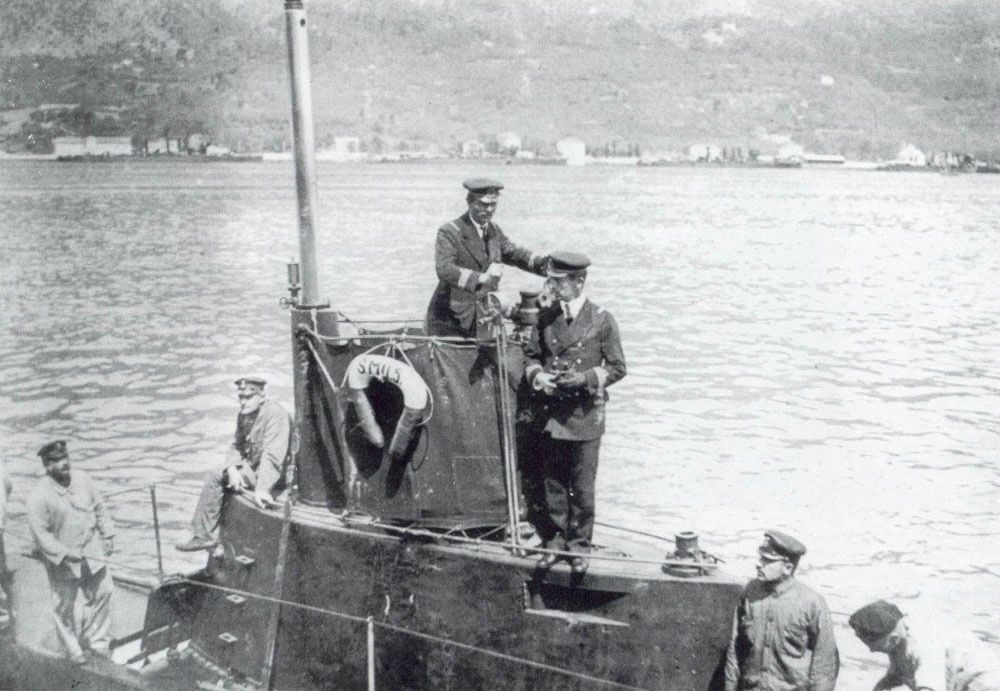
On duty aboard SM U-5

Georg Ritter von Trapp (Note: Many English sources incorrectly refer to him as a "Baron", which is one step above Ritter in the Austrian nobility. In the Austro-Hungarian Empire, recipients of the Order of Maria Theresa were entitled to be elevated to Baron. However, Trapp received the decoration in 1924 from the Republic of Austria, which did not confer any titles of nobility.) (4 April 1880 – 30 May 1947) was an officer in the Austro-Hungarian Navy who became the patriarch of the Trapp Family Singers. After their naturalisation as US citizens, the family name was changed to "Trapp" without the "von".

Trapp was the most successful Austro-Hungarian submarine commander of World War I, (Note: Some sources incorrectly credit Zdenko Hudeček with being the most successful Austro-Hungarian submarine commander of the war. Trapp is ahead of Hudeček when warship displacement is added to merchant tonnage, giving him over 60,000 tons of enemy ships sunk. Hudeček is competitive on merchant ship tonnage sunk, but only when he is credited with sinking the British tanker Mitra, which was actually damaged but not sunk. When Mitra is removed from Hudeček's list, Trapp is ahead even on merchant shipping.) sinking 11 Allied merchant ships totaling 47,653 GRT and two Allied warships displacing 12,641 tons. Trapp's accomplishments during World War I earned him numerous decorations, including the Military Order of Maria Theresa.

His first wife Agathe Whitehead died of scarlet fever in 1922, leaving behind seven children. Trapp hired Maria Augusta Kutschera to tutor one of his daughters and married her in 1927. He lost most of his wealth in the Great Depression, so the family turned to singing as a way of earning a livelihood. Trapp declined a commission in the German Navy after the Anschluss and emigrated with his family to the United States.

After his death in 1947, the family home in Stowe, Vermont, became the Trapp Family Lodge. Maria von Trapp's 1949 memoir The Story of the Trapp Family Singers was adapted into the West German film The Trapp Family (1956), which served as the basis for the Rodgers and Hammerstein musical The Sound of Music (1959) and the 1965 film adaptation directed by Robert Wise.

== Early life ==
Georg Ritter von Trapp was born in Zara in the Kingdom of Dalmatia, then a crown land of the Austro-Hungarian Empire and now in Croatia. His father, Fregattenkapitän August Johann Trapp (1836-1884), was a naval officer, and his mother, Hedwig Wepler (1855-1911) had immigrated to the Adriatic Coast from the Grand Duchy of Hesse. His father had been raised to the Austrian nobility with the hereditary title of Ritter upon being made a member of the Order of the Iron Crown; he died of typhoid fever in 1884 (aged forty-eight), when Georg was four. Trapp’s older sister was the Austrian artist Hede von Trapp, and his brother Werner died in 1915 during World War I.

== Naval career ==
In 1894, aged fourteen, Trapp followed in his father's footsteps and joined the Austro-Hungarian Navy, entering the Imperial and Royal Naval Academy at Fiume. As part of their required education, all naval cadets were taught to play a musical instrument; Georg von Trapp selected the violin. He graduated four years later and completed two years of follow-on training voyages, including one to Australia, as a cadet aboard the sail training corvette SMS Saida II. On the voyage home, he visited the Holy Land, where he met a Franciscan friar who took him on a tour of all the Biblical sites he wanted to see. Among other things, Trapp bought seven bottles of water from the Jordan River which were later used to baptize his first seven children.

In 1900, he was assigned to the protected cruiser SMS Zenta and was decorated for his performance during the Boxer Rebellion in China, in which he participated in the assault on the Taku Forts. In 1902, he passed the final officer's examination, and was commissioned a Fregattenleutnant (frigate lieutenant, equivalent to sub-lieutenant) in May 1903. He was fascinated by submarines, and in 1908 seized the opportunity to transfer to the navy's newly formed submarine arm, or U-boot-Waffe, receiving promotion to Linienschiffsleutnant (ship-of-the-line lieutenant, or lieutenant) that November. In 1910 he was given command of the newly constructed SM U-6. He commanded U-6 until 1913.

=== World War I ===
On 17 April 1915, Trapp took command of SM U-5. He conducted nine combat patrols in U-5, and sank two enemy warships. One was the French armored cruiser Léon Gambetta, sunk at 39°30′N 18°15′E on 27 April 1915, 25 kilometres (13 nautical miles; 16 miles) south of Cape Santa Maria di Leuca. In hunting and sinking Gambetta, Trapp achieved a notable success as commander of the first-ever underwater nighttime (and only the second) submarine attack on a vessel in the Adriatic. Just over three months later, he sank the Italian submarine Nereide at 42°23′N 16°16′E on 5 August 1915, 250 metres (270 yd) off Pelagosa (Palagruža) Island. He also captured the Greek steamer Cefalonia off Durazzo on 29 August 1915. Some sources incorrectly credit Trapp with sinking the Italian troop transport and armed merchant cruiser Principe Umberto, which resulted in the greatest loss of life in any submarine attack in World War I, but the ship was actually sunk by U-5 under its later commander, Friedrich Schlosser.

Trapp was transferred to the SM U-14, the former French submarine Curie, which had been sunk and salvaged by the Austro-Hungarian Navy. He conducted ten more war patrols in the much larger submarine, attacking merchant ships instead of warships. Between April 1917 and October 1917, U-14 sank 11 Allied merchant ships under Trapp's command.

In May 1918, he was promoted to Korvettenkapitän (equal to lieutenant commander) and given command of the submarine base at Cattaro in the Gulf of Kotor. However, Austria-Hungary's defeat in World War I led to the empire's collapse. The territory of the Austro-Hungarian Empire was divided among seven countries, with the Kingdom of Serbs, Croats and Slovenes keeping most of the seacoast. The Republic of German-Austria was landlocked and no longer had a navy, putting an end to Trapp's naval career.

=== War record ===
Trapp's patrols in U-5 and U-14 made him the most successful Austro-Hungarian submarine commander of World War I, sinking 11 Allied merchant ships totaling 47,653 GRT and two Allied warships displacing a total of 12,641 tons.

Vessels attacked while in command of U-5
Date	Vessel	Nationality	Fate
27 April 1915	Léon Gambetta	France	Sunk
5 August 1915	Nereide	Italy	Sunk
29 August 1915	Cefalonia	Greece	Captured

Vessels sunk while in command of U-14
Date	Vessel	Nationality	Location
28 April 1917	Teakwood	United Kingdom	36°39′N 21°10′E
3 May 1917	Antonio Sciesa	Italy	36°39′N 21°15′E
5 July 1917	Marionga Goulandris	Greece	35°38′N 22°36′E
23 August 1917	Constance	France	36°51′N 17°25′E
24 August 1917	Kilwinning	United Kingdom	35°26′N 16°30′E
26 August 1917	Titian	United Kingdom	34°20′N 17°30′E
28 August 1917	Nairn	United Kingdom	34°05′N 19°20′E
29 August 1917	Milazzo	Italy	34°44′N 19°16′E
18 October 1917	Good Hope	United Kingdom	35°53′N 17°05′E
18 October 1917	Elsiston	United Kingdom	35°40′N 17°28′E
23 October 1917	Capo Di Monte	Italy	34°53′N 19°50′E

=== Orders, decorations and medals ===
- Knight's Cross of the Military Order of Maria Theresa (1924)
- Knight's Cross of the Imperial Order of Leopold
- Knight 2nd Class of the Order of the Iron Crown (1917)
- Bronze Military Merit Medal ("Signum Laudis")
- Military Merit Cross
- 1898 Jubilee Medal
- 1908 Jubilee Cross
- War Medal 1914–1918 with swords
- Long Service Cross (18 years)
- Iron Cross 1st and 2nd Class (German Empire)
- Liakat Medal (Ottoman Empire)
- Order of St. Stanislaus 3rd Class (Russian Empire)

== First marriage and inherited wealth ==
Lieutenant Georg Ritter von Trapp and Agathe Whitehead about 1910

Trapp married Agathe Gobertina Whitehead, the eldest daughter and third child of Cavaliere (Knight) John Whitehead (1854–1902) and Countess Agathe Gobertina von Breunner-Enckevoirth (1856–1945). Whitehead was the son of English engineer Robert Whitehead (1823–1905), who invented the modern torpedo. The British government rejected Whitehead's invention, but Austrian Emperor Franz Josef invited him to open a torpedo factory in Fiume. Trapp's first command was the U-boat U-6, which was launched by Agathe.

Agathe's inherited wealth sustained the couple and permitted them to start a family, and they had two sons and five daughters over the next ten years. Their first child was Rupert, born on 1 November 1911 at Pula while the couple were living at Pina Budicina 11. (Note: The Villa Trapp is at Pina Budicina 11 at 44°52′10.40″N 13°50′29.43″E) Their other children were: Agathe, also born in Pula; Maria Franziska, Werner; Hedwig, and Johanna, all born at the family home the Erlhof in Zell am See; (Note: The Erlhof is at 47°18′46.88″N 12°48′59.53″E) and Martina, born at the Martinsschlössel at Klosterneuburg, for which she was named. (Note: The Martinsschlössel is at 48°18′48.04″N 16°19′10.47″E)

On 3 September 1922, Agathe von Trapp died of scarlet fever contracted from her daughter Agathe. Trapp then acquired Villa Trapp in Aigen, a suburb of Salzburg, and moved his family there in 1924. (Note: The family villa in Aigen is at 47°47′19.59″N 13°4′53.00″E) During this period, he delivered several lectures and conducted interviews on his naval career.

== Second marriage ==
About 1926, Maria Franziska was recovering from an illness and was unable to go to school, so Trapp hired Maria Augusta Kutschera, a novice from the nearby Nonnberg Abbey as a tutor. They were married on 26 November 1927 when he was 47 and she was 22. They had three children: Rosmarie, born on 8 February 1929, Eleonore (called Lorli), born 14 May 1931, and Johannes, born 17 January 1939 in Pennsylvania.

== Turning to music ==
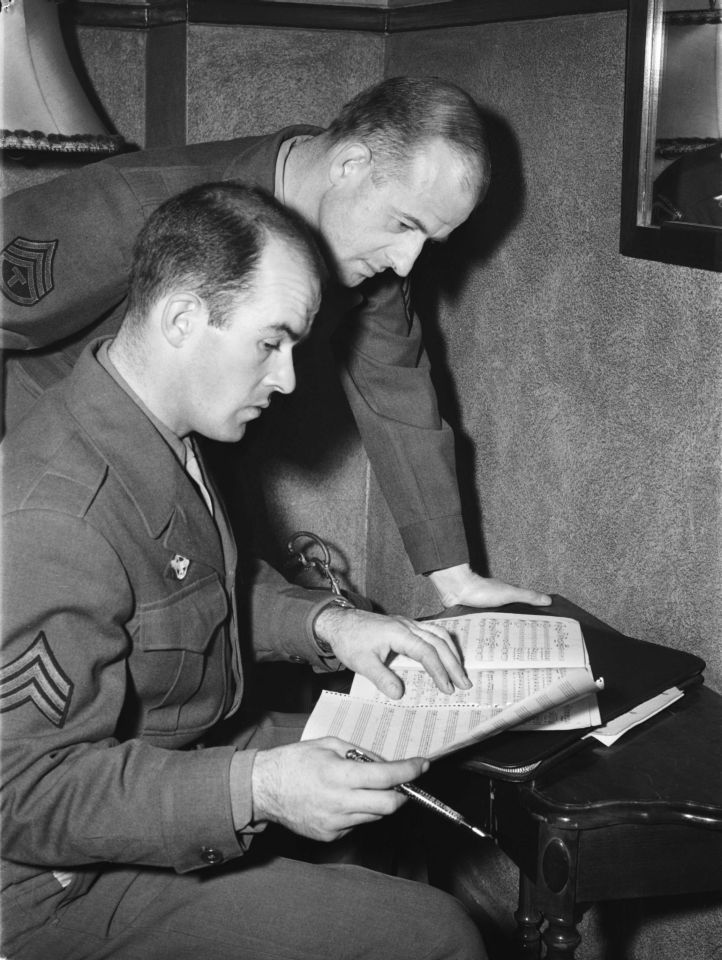
The two eldest Trapp sons, Rupert (right) and Werner, in U.S. Army uniforms, reading sheet music on 24 January 1946

In 1935, Trapp's money, inherited from his (English-connected) first wife, was invested in a bank in England. Austria was under economic pressure from a hostile Germany, and Austrian banks were in a precarious position. Trapp sought to help a friend in the banking business, Auguste Caroline Lammer (1885–1937), so he withdrew most of his money from London and deposited it in an Austrian bank. The bank failed, wiping out most of the family's substantial fortune.

At about that time, a Catholic priest, Franz Wasner, instructed the children in music. Around 1936, Lotte Lehmann heard the family sing, and she suggested they perform paid concerts. When the Austrian Chancellor Kurt von Schuschnigg heard them on the radio, he invited them to perform in Vienna. Father Wasner became the group's musical director.

== Departure from Austria ==
According to Maria von Trapp's memoirs, Georg von Trapp found himself in a vexing situation after the German takeover of Austria in 1938. He was offered a commission in the German Navy. This was a tempting proposition, particularly when Georg von Trapp saw the technological advances in 1930s U-boats unthinkable compared to those he had once commanded in World War I, but Trapp decided to decline the offer out of opposition to Nazi ideology. He also politely declined a request for the family choir to perform at Hitler's birthday concert. After his eldest son also announced his intention to refuse to benefit from anti-Semitism and to similarly decline a medical position at a prestigious Vienna hospital that had just fired all Jewish doctors, Georg von Trapp realized that the writing was on the wall. He summoned all his children and warned them that no family could safely refuse three successive offers from a man like Adolf Hitler. After Georg advised them that they must choose between a life of comfort or become refugees and keep their honour, the Trapp family decided to emigrate from Nazi Austria.

On leaving Austria, the Trapps traveled by train to Italy (not over the mountains by foot to Switzerland as is depicted in The Sound of Music). The family had a contract with an American booking agent when they left Austria. Once in Italy, they contacted the agent and requested fare to America, first traveling to London, before sailing to the United States for their first concert tour.

In 1939, the family returned to Europe to tour Scandinavia, hoping to continue their concerts in cities beyond the reach of the Third Reich. During this time, they went back to Salzburg for a few months before returning to Sweden to finish the tour. From there, they traveled to Norway to begin the trip back to the United States in September 1939, just after World War II broke out.

After living for a short time in Merion, Pennsylvania, where their youngest child, Johannes, was born, the family settled in Stowe, Vermont, in 1941. They purchased a 660-acre (270 ha) farm in 1942 and converted it into the Trapp Family Lodge. In January 1947, Major General Harry J. Collins turned to the Trapp family in the US pleading for help for the Austrian people, having seen first-hand the suffering of the residents of Salzburg when he had arrived there with the 42nd Infantry Division after World War II. The Trapp Family founded the Trapp Family Austrian Relief, Inc.; the priest Franz Wasner, their pre-war friend, became its treasurer.

== Death ==
Trapp died of lung cancer on 30 May 1947 in Stowe, Vermont. In The Story of the Trapp Family Singers (1949), Maria von Trapp pointed out that there was a high incidence of lung cancer among World War I U-boat crews, due to the diesel and gasoline fumes and poor ventilation, and that his death could be considered service-related. She also acknowledged in her book that, like most men of the period, he was a heavy smoker.

== Children ==
Image	Name	Mother	Birth	Death	Notes
	Rupert	Agathe Gobertina née Whitehead	1 November 1911	22 February 1992 (aged 80)	He married Henriette Lajoie (1927) in 1947 and had two sons and four daughters; they later divorced. He later married Janice Tyre (1920–1994), and had no children with her. He was a physician.
	Agathe	Agathe Gobertina née Whitehead	12 March 1913	28 December 2010 (aged 97)	She worked as a singer and an artist, and lived in Baltimore, Maryland. Agathe ran a kindergarten with her longtime friend of 50 years, Mary Louise Kane, at the Sacred Heart Catholic parish in Glyndon, Maryland. She had no children.
	Maria Franziska	Agathe Gobertina née Whitehead	28 September 1914	18 February 2014 (aged 99)	She worked as a singer and missionary in Papua New Guinea, no children. In 2008 she visited the ancestral home.
	Werner	Agathe Gobertina née Whitehead	21 December 1915	11 October 2007 (aged 91)	He married Erika Klambauer in 1948 and had four sons and two daughters, including Elisabeth von Trapp.
	Hedwig	Agathe Gobertina née Whitehead	28 July 1917	14 September 1972 (aged 55)	She worked as a teacher, lived in Hawaii, and died of asthma, no children.
	Johanna	Agathe Gobertina née Whitehead	7 September 1919	25 November 1994 (aged 75)	She married Ernst Florian Winter in 1948 and had three sons, one died, and four daughters. She lived in Vienna and died there.
	Martina	Agathe Gobertina née Whitehead	17 February 1921	25 February 1951 (aged 30)	In 1949, she married Jean Dupiere (died before 1998). She died of complications during childbirth and had a stillborn daughter.
	Rosmarie	Maria Augusta von Trapp née Kutschera	February 8, 1929	13 May 2022 (aged 93)	Rosmarie worked as a singer and missionary in Papua New Guinea. She most recently lived in Pittsburgh, and had no children.
	Eleonore	Maria Augusta von Trapp née Kutschera	May 14, 1931	17 October 2021 (aged 90)	She married Hugh David Campbell in 1954 and had seven daughters. She lived with her family in Waitsfield, Vermont.
	Johannes	Maria Augusta von Trapp née Kutschera	17 January 1939 (age 87)		Married 1969 to Lynne Peterson and has one son, Sam von Trapp, and one daughter, Kristina von Trapp-Frame. Johannes managed the family resort in Stowe, Vermont, with his son Sam.

== Portrayals ==
Trapp has been portrayed in various adaptations of his family's life such as The Sound of Music, both the 1965 film (played by Christopher Plummer) and the Broadway musical, as well as two German films, The Trapp Family (1956) and The Trapp Family in America (1958). However, these adaptations often altered the portrayal of the Captain. In real life and in the memoir The Story of the Trapp Family Singers, written by his second wife Maria Augusta Trapp, the Captain has been described as being a warm and loving father who was always around. However, the Captain was portrayed in a more negative light in many adaptations. For instance, in the 1965 film, Georg von Trapp was portrayed as a disciplinary man who always went away and did not care for his children or their feelings at the beginning of the film. BBC Radio presented a different account of the family in October, 2009, in a play by Annie Caulfield called The Von Trapps and Me, focused on Princess Yvonne, "the woman Captain Von Trapp jilted in order to marry Maria."
