= The Story of the Trapp Family Singers =

1949 memoir by Maria von Trapp

- Cover art for the first and some subsequent editions
- Author: Maria Augusta von Trapp
- Language: English
- Genre: Memoir
- Publisher: J. B. Lippincott Company
- Publication date: 1949
- Publication place: United States
- Media type: Print (Hardcover)
- Pages: 328

The Story of the Trapp Family Singers is a 1949 memoir written by Maria Augusta von Trapp, whose life was later fictionalized in Rodgers and Hammerstein's Broadway musical The Sound of Music in 1959.

== Background ==
Maria never intended to write anything of her life. However, a friend persistently pleaded with her not to allow her story to be forgotten by others. Though she denied she had any writing skill whatsoever, her friend was not to be put off and kept on asking her whenever they saw each other. Finally, one day, in desperation, Maria excused herself and went to her room for an hour to scribble a few pages about her life story, hoping to prove once and for all she was no writer.

However, this displayed such natural writing talent that she reluctantly agreed to finish what she had started, and her jottings formed the basis of the first chapter of her memoirs. Her book, The Story of the Trapp Family Singers, was a best-seller. The book was published in 1949 by J. B. Lippincott Company of Philadelphia, Pennsylvania.

A German edition was published in 1952 by Frick in Vienna, with the title Die Trapp-Familie: Vom Kloster zum Welterfolg ("The Trapp Family: From Monastery to Global Success").

== Contents ==
The book describes the life of the von Trapp family, from their beginnings in Salzburg, Austria, to their adventures in America after they escaped from German-occupied Europe. The story reflects on family tragedies, victories, and the kindness of strangers who soon became friends to the young family.

== Adaptations ==
- Die Trapp-Familie (The Trapp Family), 1956 film
- Die Trapp-Familie in Amerika (The Trapp Family in America), 1958 film
- The Sound of Music, 1959 stage musical; also see other stage adaptations in this article
- The Sound of Music, 1965 film starring Julie Andrews and Christopher Plummer
- Trapp Ikka Monogatari (Trapp Family Story), 1991 animated TV series, part of World Masterpiece Theater (Not a direct adaptation, but used the book as one of the sources. The only animated adaptation of the story.)
- The Sound of Music Live!, 2013 live television production starring Carrie Underwood
- The Sound of Music Live, 2015 live television production starring Kara Tointon
- Sarigama (Sinhala: සරිගම), 2016 Sinhala musical film written and directed by Somaratne Dissanayake
- The Sound of Music, 2017 Innovative Arts stage musical

== Differences between the book and the musicals ==
Maria married Georg von Trapp in 1927, not 1938, as portrayed in the musical. She initially fell in love with the children, rather than the father, and only later came to love him. The father was not the aloof patriarch who disapproved of music, but a warm, gentle-hearted parent. They also left Austria openly by train, instead of secretly at night.

They first performed in the Salzburg Festival in 1936, not 1938, as portrayed in the musical, and not as a ruse to give them more time to make their escape, as portrayed in the musical. The musical telescopes many events and a long time frame into fewer events and a very short space of time. By the time the family left Austria in real life in 1938, two more children had been born and a third was on the way. In the musical, only the original seven children are portrayed, and Maria and Georg have only been married for one month when they and the seven children leave Austria.

The children's names and ages are different in the musical and there is no exact equivalent for each child, although some of the children in the musical seem similar to the ones in the book. Liesl, the oldest daughter in the musical, is, for the most part, a fictional character, and certainly Rolf, the messenger boy with a romantic interest in Liesl, has no known equivalent in the family's real life. The younger children were probably at least partly inspired by the family's real children, but this does not necessarily imply any direct link between any particular fictional child and any particular actual child.

== Edition ==
- The Story of the Trapp Family Singers, ISBN 0-385-02896-2 (Doubleday 1990).
