= Rosmarie Trapp =

American singer, teacher, and missionary (1929–2022)

Rosmarie Agathe Erentrudis von Trapp (February 8, 1929 – May 13, 2022) was an American singer, teacher, and missionary. She was the first daughter of Maria von Trapp and Georg von Trapp.
