= Agathe Whitehead =

British-Austrian heiress (1891–1922)

- Whitehead and von Trapp in 1909
- Born: Agathe Gobertina Whitehead; 14 June 1891; Fiume, Kingdom of Croatia-Slavonia, Austria-Hungary
- Died: 3 September 1922 (aged 31); Klosterneuburg, Austria
- Spouse: Georg Ritter von Trapp (m. 1911)
- Children: Rupert von Trapp; Agathe von Trapp; Maria Franziska von Trapp; Werner von Trapp; Hedwig von Trapp; Johanna von Trapp; Martina von Trapp
- Parents: John Whitehead (father); Countess Agathe Gobertina von Breunner-Enckevoirth (mother)

Agathe Gobertina von Trapp (née Whitehead; 14 June 1891 – 3 September 1922) was a British-Austrian heiress and aristocrat. She was the first wife of Georg Ritter von Trapp and the mother of seven children of the Trapp Family singers.

== Early life and family ==
Whitehead was born on 14 June 1891 in Fiume, the first daughter and third child of John Whitehead and Countess Agathe Gobertina von Breunner-Enckevoirth. Her father, a British engineer who had been made a knight of the Order of Franz Joseph, was the son of Robert Whitehead, namesake of the Whitehead torpedo. Her mother, an amateur architect and pianist, was a member of the Austrian and Hungarian nobility. Through her father, Whitehead was a niece of the diplomat Sir James Beethom Whitehead, who served as the British Minister to Serbia, and a first cousin of Sir Edgar Whitehead, who served as Prime Minister of Southern Rhodesia. Through her mother, Whitehead was the niece of Countess Marie von Breunner-Enckevoirth, the wife of Victor II, Duke of Ratibor and Prince of Corvey, and the niece of Countess Eleonore von Breunner-Enckevoirth, the wife of Karl Maria Alexander, 9th Prince of Auersperg. Her maternal cousin, Princess Agathe of Hohenlohe-Schillingsfürst, was the wife of Prince Friedrich Wilhelm of Prussia.

Whitehead grew up at Villa Whitehead, a palatial home near the Adriatic Sea. Her family was closely linked with the Austrian imperial family and, shortly after her birth, Emperor Franz Joseph I visited the family's home and torpedo factory in Fiume. Fluent in English, German, and Italian, Whitehead was educated at home by tutors and was given piano, violin, and voice lessons.

Whitehead's father died in 1902 from stomach cancer. From that time on, her mother raised her and her five siblings, and the management of the torpedo factory passed to a paternal relative. After the family spent a summer at Lake Zell in the Austria Alps, Whitehead's mother built Erlhof, a waterfront house which became the family's summer residence.

== Later life ==
On 10 February 1909, Whitehead christened the Austrian submarine SM U-5. A celebratory ball was held later that evening, where she was introduced to Georg Ritter von Trapp, a nobleman and naval officer who would eventually be assigned to command SM U-5. Shortly afterward, he was invited to vacation with the Whiteheads at Erlhof. After a two-year courtship, Whitehead and von Trapp were married on 14 January 1911 in a Catholic ceremony in the chapel of the Imperial and Royal Naval Academy at Fiume.

After their wedding, the couple moved into the Trapp family's villa in Pola, near the Austro-Hungarian Navy's submarine base. She gave birth to a son, Rupert, in 1911 and a daughter, Agathe, in 1913.

After the assassination of Archduke Franz Ferdinand in 1914 and the start of the First World War, Whitehead's family's assets overseas were frozen and they were not permitted to leave the country. All non-military personnel were ordered to evacuate from Fiume and Pola, and Whitehead took her children to Zell am See to stay with her mother and siblings at Erlhof while her husband stayed behind to serve as a naval commander. Her husband was only permitted to see the family while on furlough, and spent the war captaining two submarines, patrolling the Strait of Otranto. Her brother, John Whitehead Jr., and brother-in-law, Werner Ritter von Trapp, both died during the war. Throughout the war, she contributed her time to the war effort by knitting clothes and rolling bandages for the soldiers and visiting the wives of Naval personnel in their community. During this time she gave birth to three more children, Maria Franziska, Werner, and Hedwig.

When the war ended, and the Austro-Hungarian Empire fell, the family were granted Italian citizenship since Zara, where Georg von Trapp was born, was annexed to the Kingdom of Italy. Whitehead gave birth to another daughter at Erlhof, Johanna. The family moved to Klosterneuburg, where Whitehead gave birth to another daughter, her last child, Martina.

In 1921 the family attended the wedding of Whitehead's sister, Mary, to Baron Gioacchino Pietro Malfatti di Montetretto. Later that year a scarlet fever epidemic hit the schools in Klosterneuburg, and the children were infected. By Christmas 1921, five of the von Trapp children were isolated in the home. Whitehead spent extra time caring for her youngest daughter, Martina, who was faring worse than the other children. By the middle of January 1922, Whitehead had also fallen ill and was sent to a hospital in Vienna. She stayed at the hospital for seven months but never fully recovered. Whitehead was released from the hospital and went with her family to vacation in the Hungarian countryside, hoping that it would improve her health. Seven days after returning home, on 3 September 1922, Whitehead died.
