= Trapp Family =

Musical family

The Trapp Family
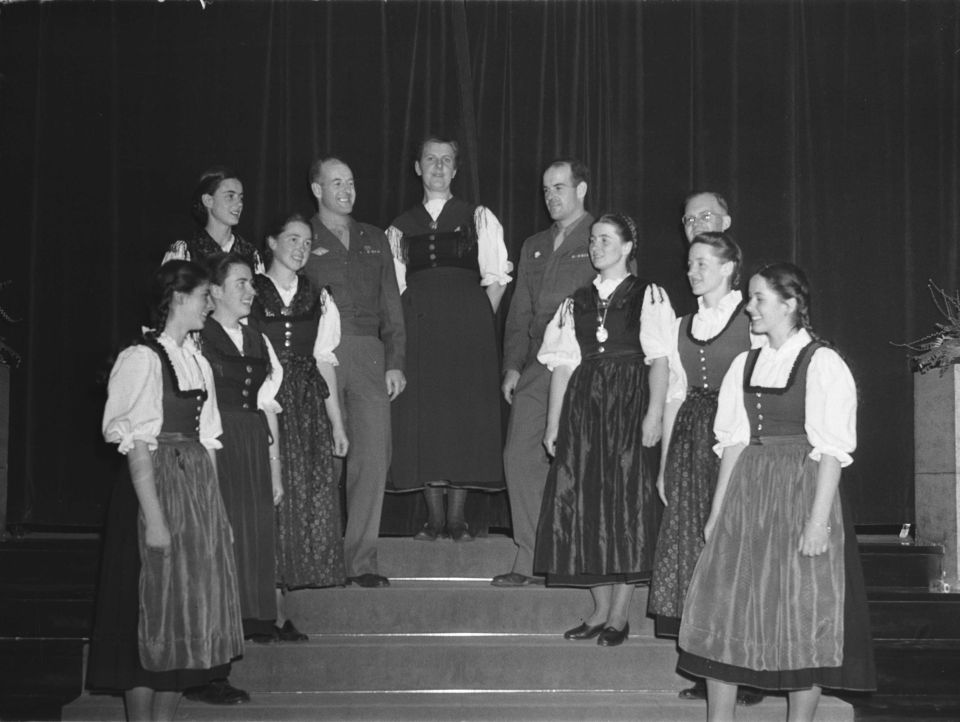
- The Trapp Family in January 1946. Photograph by Conrad Poirier.

Background information
- Also known as: The von Trapp Family; The Trapp Family Singers; The Trapp Family Choir
- Origin: Salzburg, Austria
- Genres: Vocal music, religious music, instrumental music
- Years active: 1935–1957
- Labels: Victor, Decca, Deutsche Grammophon
- Past members: Georg Ludwig Ritter von Trapp; Maria Augusta von Trapp; Rupert Gorbertus Ritter 'Knight' von Trapp; Agathe Johanna Erwina Gorbetina von Trapp; Maria Franziska Gorbetina 'Mitzi' von Trapp; Werner Gorbertus Ritter 'Knight' von Trapp; Hedwig Adolphine Gorbetina von Trapp; Johanna Karolina Gorbetina von Trapp; Martina Alice Gorbetina von Trapp; Rosmarie Trapp; Eleonore von Trapp; Johannes von Trapp

The Trapp Family (also known as the von Trapp Family) was a singing group formed from the family of former Austrian naval commander Georg von Trapp. The family achieved fame in their original singing career in their native Austria during the interwar period. They also performed in the United States before immigrating there permanently to escape the deteriorating situation in Austria leading up to World War II. In the United States, they became well known as the "Trapp Family Singers" until they ceased to perform as a unit in 1957. The family's story later served as the basis for a memoir, two German films, and the Rodgers and Hammerstein Broadway musical The Sound of Music. The last surviving of the original seven (born to Captain von Trapp and his wife Agathe Whitehead), Maria Franziska, died in 2014 at the age of 99. The youngest and last surviving member of the Trapp Family Singers (born to Captain von Trapp and Maria von Trapp) is Johannes von Trapp.

== Biography ==
=== History of the group ===
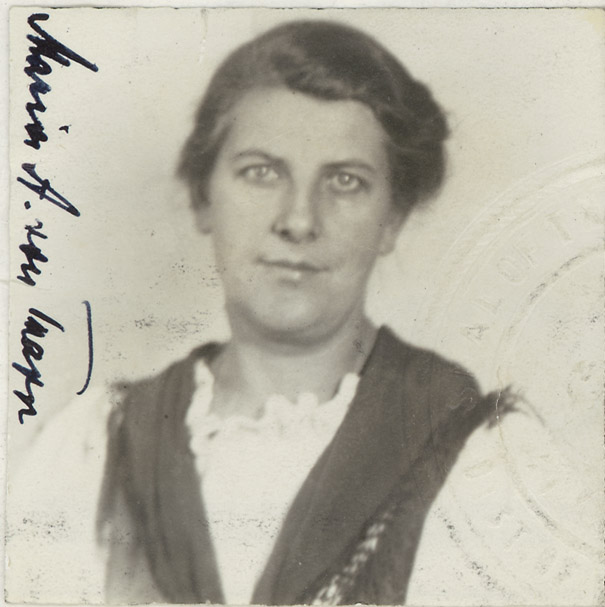
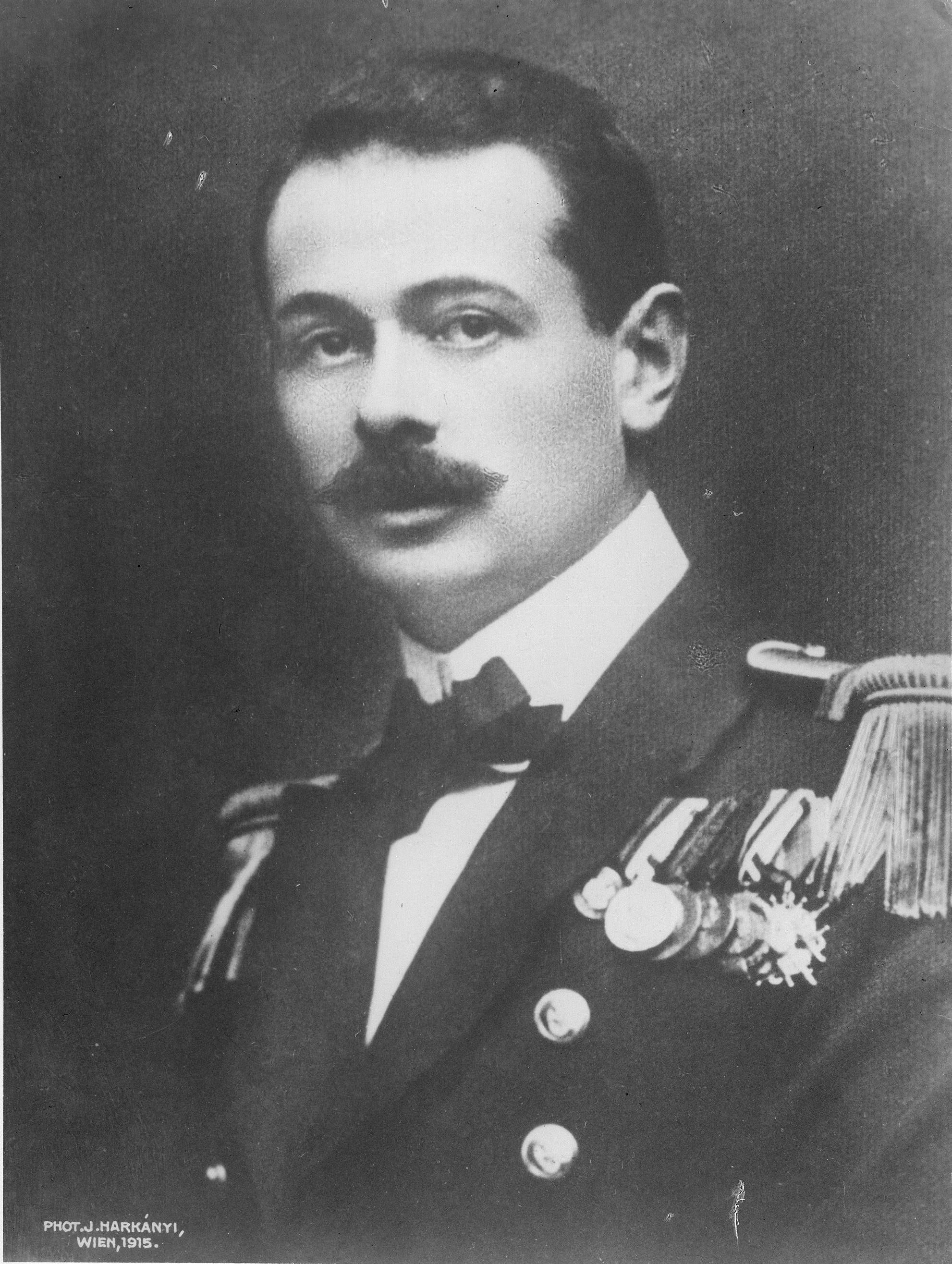
Maria and Georg Ludwig von Trapp

The Trapp family was originally part of the Austrian nobility and held the hereditary title of Ritter from 1877, granted to them by Emperor Franz Joseph I. Georg von Trapp had seven children at the time of the death of his first wife, Agathe Whitehead, and in 1927 he married Maria Kutschera, who was twenty-five years his junior, and had three more children with her. Both parts of the family were musical and devoutly Catholic, and by 1935 the family was singing at the local church in Aigen, where they made the acquaintance of a young priest, Fr Franz Wasner, who encouraged their musical progress and taught them sacred music to add to the folk songs, madrigals, and ballads they were already singing. Whilst singing at their Salzburg home, they were also heard by the German concert singer Lotte Lehmann, who persuaded them to take part in the song competition in Salzburg in 1936, for which they won a prize; after this, accompanied by Dr. Wasner, the family toured and performed in Vienna and Salzburg and undertook a European tour that encompassed France, Belgium, the Netherlands, Italy, Germany and England.

When Adolf Hitler invaded Austria in 1938, the family escaped, first to Italy (of which the Zadar-born Georg and thus the family were legally citizens). For some months in 1938, just after their flight, they lived in Warmond, near The Hague, Netherlands, as the guests of a Dutch banker, Ernest Menten. This episode is described by local historian Miep Smitsloo in her 2007 Dutch book 'Tussen Tol en Trekvaart' ('Between Toll and Canal'). In her account of the flight, Maria von Trapp does not mention this stay. From there they went to London and then to the United States, where they stayed until the expiration of their visas. After touring in Scandinavia, they returned to the United States on September 7, 1939, and applied for immigrant status. They arrived with very little money, having lost most of the family fortune earlier during a 1935 banking collapse in Austria. Once in the United States, they earned money by performing and touring nationally and internationally, first as the "Trapp Family Choir" and then the "Trapp Family Singers", a change suggested by their booking agent Frederick Christian Schang. After living for a short time in Philadelphia and then Merion, Pennsylvania, where their youngest child Johannes was born, the family settled in Stowe, Vermont, in 1941. They purchased a 660-acre (270 ha) farm in 1942 and converted it into the Trapp Family Lodge, initially called "Cor Unum" (Latin for One Heart). After World War II, they founded the Trapp Family Austrian Relief fund, which sent food and clothing to people impoverished in Austria. By now based permanently in the United States, the family performed their unique mixture of liturgical music, madrigals, folk music and instrumentals to audiences in over 30 countries for the next 20 years. They made a series of 78 rpm records for RCA Victor in the 1950s, some of which were later issued on RCA Camden LPs. There were also a few later recordings released on LPs, including some stereo sessions. The family singing group disbanded in 1957.

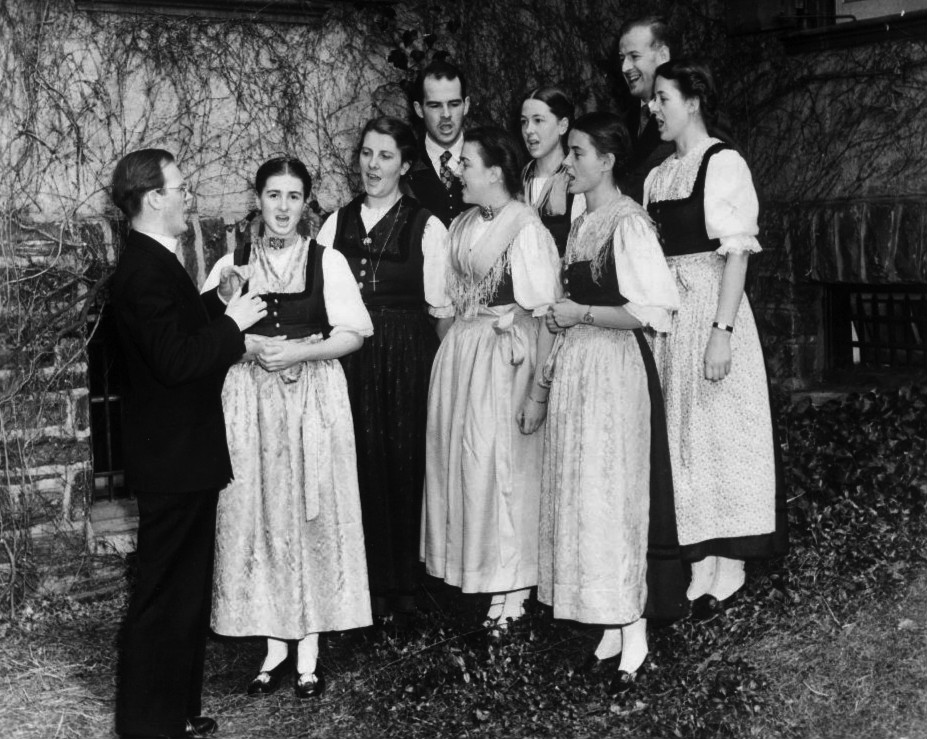
The Trapp Family rehearsing before a concert, near Boston, 27 September 1941

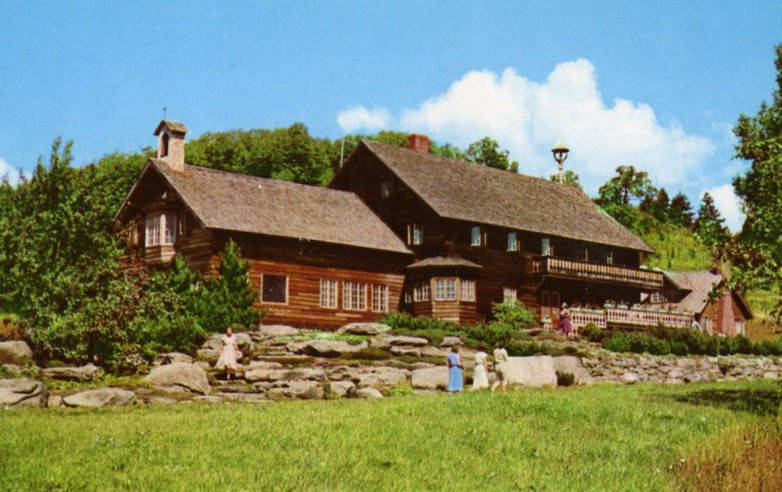
Cor Unum (later the "Trapp Family Lodge"), home of the Trapp Family Singers in the U.S., in 1954

Maria wrote an account of the singing family The Story of the Trapp Family Singers which was published in 1949. It was the inspiration for the 1956 West German film The Trapp Family, which in turn inspired Rodgers and Hammerstein's 1959 Broadway musical The Sound of Music. The 1965 film adaptation of the musical, starring Julie Andrews and Christopher Plummer, was the highest-grossing film of all-time for five years. The original seven Trapp children were:

- Rupert Georg Gorbertus Ritter 'Knight' von Trapp (1911–1992);
- Agathe Johanna Erwina Gorbetina von Trapp (1913–2010);
- Maria Agatha Franziska Gorbetina 'Mitzi' von Trapp (1914–2014);
- Werner Georg Gorbertus Ritter von Trapp (1915–2007);
- Hedwig Adolphine Gorbetina von Trapp (1917–1972);
- Johanna Karolina von Trapp (1919–1994);
- Martina Alice Gorbetina von Trapp (1921–1951);

The later children were:

- Eleonore (1931–2021),
- Rosmarie (1929–2022),
- Johannes (b. 1939).

The eldest daughter, Agathe (called "Liesl" in the 1965 film), published her own account of life in the Trapp family in 2003, Memories Before and After The Sound of Music, which was later itself turned into the film The von Trapp Family: A Life of Music in 2015.

=== Later lives ===
Two members of the group died while the group was still active, Georg in 1947 at age 67, and Martina, who died in childbirth in 1951 at age 30. At the time of its cessation in 1957, the group included a number of non-family members and "only Maria's iron will had kept the group together for so long." After the group's demise, Maria, Johannes, Rosmarie, and Maria Franziska went to New Guinea to do missionary work; later Maria returned to run the Trapp Family Lodge for a number of years.

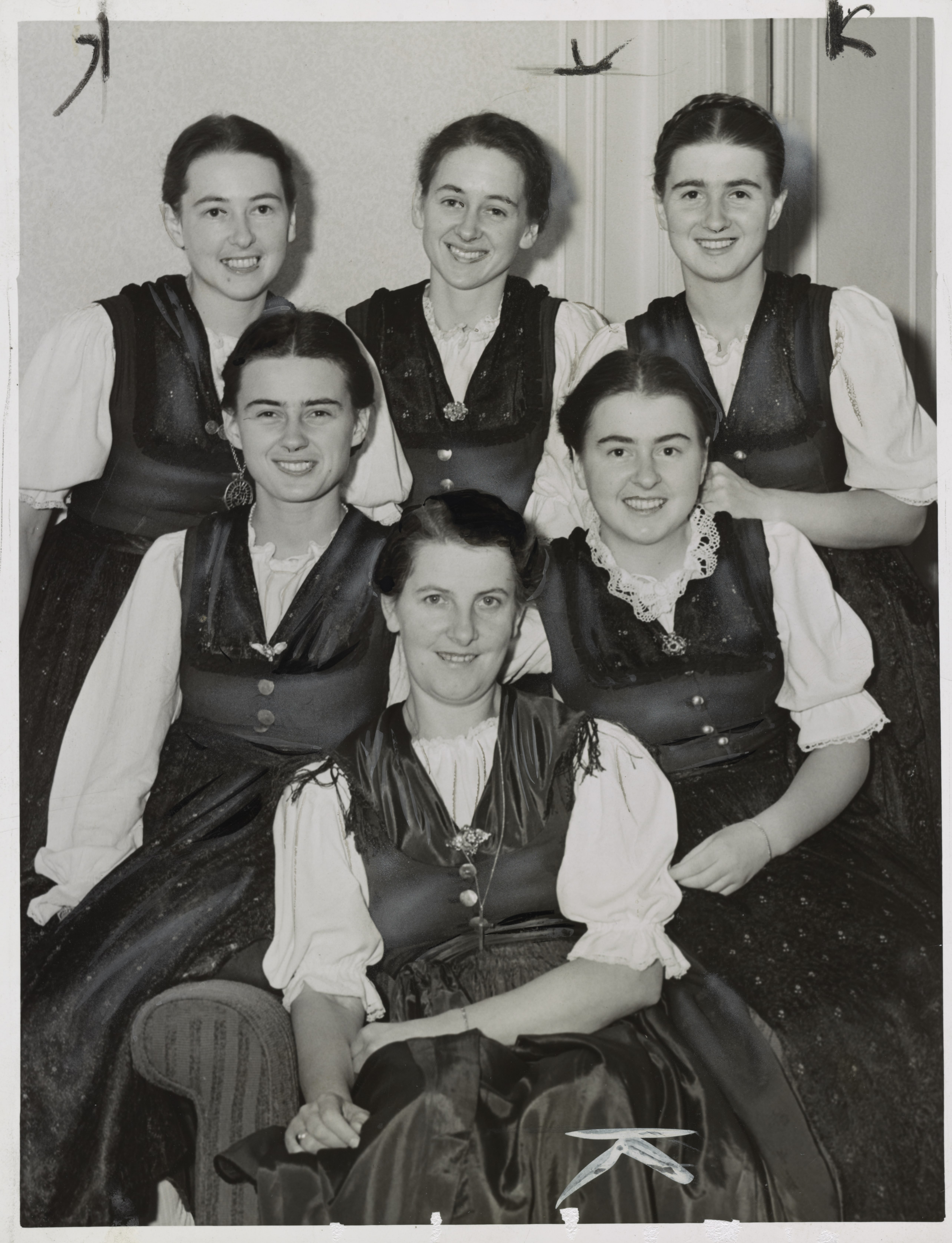
Baroness Maria Augusta von Trapp (front) and five of her ten singing children (back row, left to right) Agathe Johanna Erwina Gorbetina, Hedwig Adolphine Gorbetina and Johanna Karolina; (center, left to right) Maria Agatha Franzika Gorbetina 'Mitzi' and Martina Alice Gorbetina.

Of the remaining children in their later years, Rupert was already a medical doctor during World War II; Agathe spent many years as a kindergarten teacher in Maryland; Maria Franziska spent thirty years as a missionary in New Guinea; Werner became a farmer; Hedwig a music teacher; Johanna married and returned to Austria; Rosmarie and Eleonore both settled in Vermont; and Johannes followed his mother by managing the Trapp Family Lodge as a tourist resort. Maria died in 1987 and was buried with Georg and Martina in the family cemetery on the property. All of the original seven Trapp children had died by 2014, while only one of the later three children born to Georg and Maria, Johannes, is alive as of October 2025. Eleonore "Lorli" von Trapp Campbell died on 17 October 2021, and Rosmarie died on 13 May 2022.

== Musical style and repertoire ==
The real-life Trapp family were a respected Austrian singing group throughout their career. However, their style was a world away from the Rodgers and Hammerstein-created, crowd-pleasing popular numbers as later included in the musical and film versions of their lives. Many of their studio recordings survive and have been reproduced as contemporary CD compilations. As for their live performances, in his 2004 essay Family values: The Trapp Family Singers in North America, 1938-1956, Michael Saffle writes:

It is difficult to document today precisely what the Trapps performed and where they performed it. Only a very few of their programs have been reprinted. One of these—again, a Christmas program—identifies an arrangement of three short pieces (for "Antique Instruments") and a Sonata by Sammartini (presented by a "Quintet of Recorders") as the evening's principal instrumental selections; shorter vocal works included Praetorius's "Es ist ein Ros' entsprungen," a Monteverdi madrigal, Holst's "Midwinter," and an arrangement of "The Holly and the Ivy." Another program—unfortunately incomplete, but known to have been presented in 1943 at Boston's Jordan Hall—featured a song by John Dowland, transcriptions by Wasner of Tyrolean folk tunes, and a Trio for two recorders and viola da gamba composed by "Werner von Trapp." In spite of their instrumental accomplishments, however, the Trapps were above all a vocal ensemble that sang (and played) music together largely for religious reasons.

On the other hand, press releases subsequent to 1940 advertised "rollicking folk songs of many lands," "gay, lilting madrigals," and "lusty yodels and mountain calls" as well as "exquisite old motets and masses," and bragged of "record cross-country tour[s]" and large numbers of engagements, which attested to their popular appeal and suggests that the religious content was only one of several contributing elements to this over their main period of popularity in America.

According to Maria, under the management of F.C. Schang, "Our programs in the past had been mostly in Latin and German. Now we added English numbers. Among the English madrigals and folksongs we found some wonderful pieces like 'Sweet Honeysucking Bees,' 'Early One Morning,' and 'Just as the Tide Was Flowing;' and among the old American folksongs we found hidden treasures. Our program now had five parts: first, sacred music, selections from the ancient masters from the sixteenth and seventeenth centuries; second, music played on the ancient instruments: recorders, viola da gamba, spinet; third, madrigals and ballads; fourth, Austrian folksongs and mountain calls; fifth, English and American folksongs."

== Legacy ==
Five grandchildren of Werner von Trapp (called "Kurt" in the 1965 film), great-grandchildren of Georg and step great-grandchildren of Maria, formed the singing group "The von Trapps." They recorded five albums in a modern style between 2001 and 2016 before disbanding.

== Partial discography ==
=== 78 recordings ===
- Trapp Family Choir: Folk Songs of Central Europe – Victor (Dr. Franz Wasner, conductor) (78 rpm set, 5 records):

=== LP releases ===
- An Evening of Folk Songs with the Trapp Family Singers – Decca DL 9793
- Christmas with the Trapp Family Singers – Deutsche Grammophon, 1953
- The Best of the Trapp Family Singers – Decca, 1960
- The Sound of Music Sung and Played by Members of the Famous Trapp Family Singers and Chorus – RCA, LSP-2277, 1960
- The Original Trapp Family Choir: The Sound of Folk Music of Many Lands – CAS904eLP33 1965 (compilation)

=== CD releases (compilations) ===
- The Sound of Christmas – Delta Distribution / Laserlight, 1992
- Journey Jasmine (2 CDs)
- One Voice Jasmine (2 CDs)
- Original Trapp Family Singers

== See also ==
- List of Austrians in music
