= Salzburg Airport =

Second-largest airport in Austria

Salzburg Airport Flughafen Salzburg

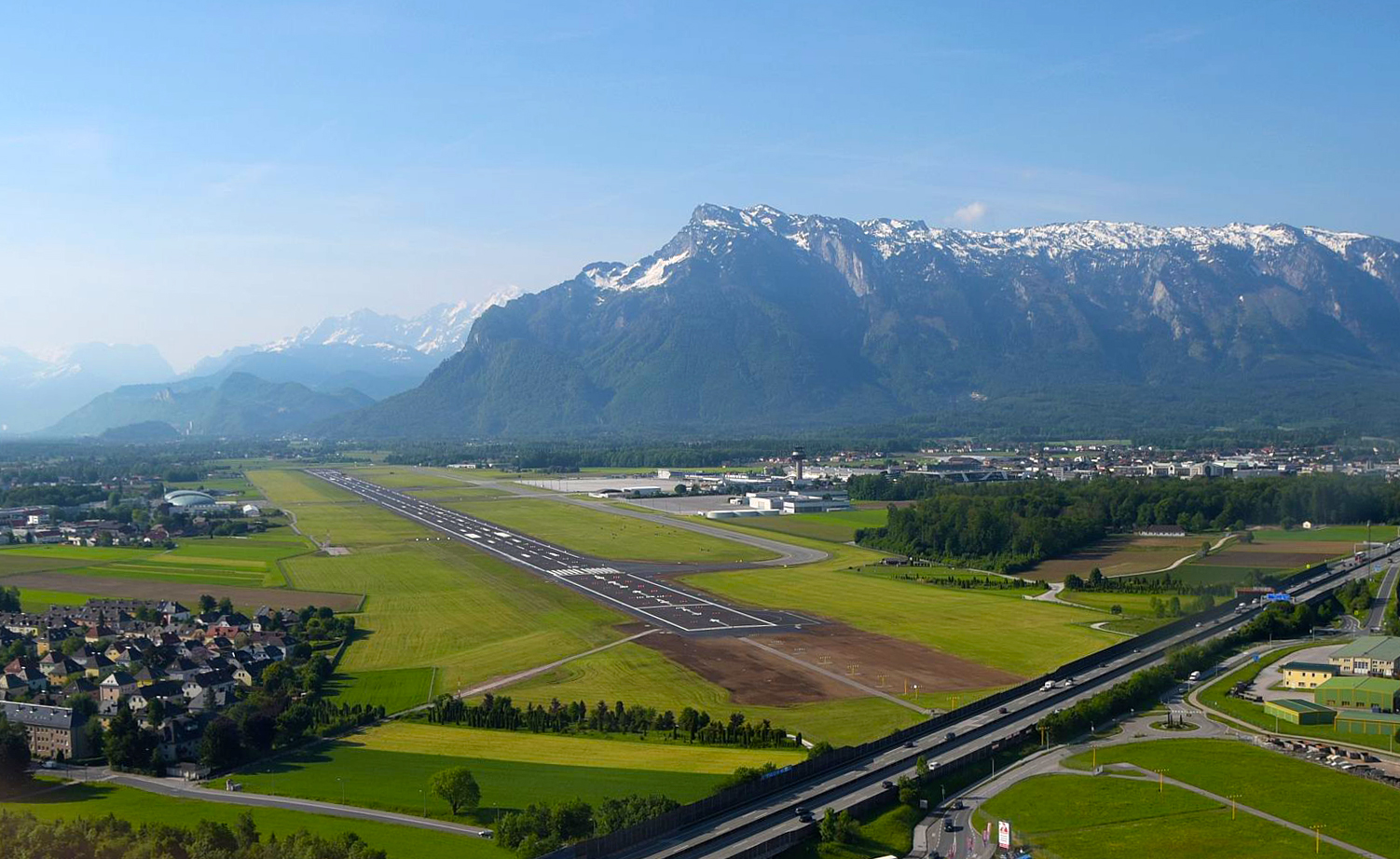
- IATA: SZG; ICAO: LOWS

Summary
- Airport type: Public
- Operator: Salzburger Flughafen GmbH
- Serves: Salzburg, Austria
- Hub for: Eurowings Europe
- Elevation AMSL: 430 m (1,410 ft)
- Coordinates: 47°47′40″N 013°00′12″E
- Website: salzburg-airport.com

Map
- Location of airport in Austria

Runways
Direction	Length		Surface
Direction	m	ft	Surface
15/33	2,750	9,022	Concrete

Statistics (2025)
- Passengers: 1,774,454 ▼-0.7%
- Aircraft movements: 14,747 ▲+2.7%
- Cargo (metric tons): 151.8 ▼-6.1%
- Source: Statistics Austria

Salzburg Airport (IATA: SZG, ICAO: LOWS), branded as Salzburg Airport W. A. Mozart, is Austria's second-largest airport. It serves Salzburg, the fourth-largest Austrian city, and is a gateway to Austria's numerous ski areas. The airport is located 1.7 NM (3.1 km; 2.0 mi) west-south-west of the Salzburg City centre and 2 km (1.2 mi) from the Austrian-German border. It is jointly owned by Salzburg Municipality (25%) and Salzburg State (75%). The airport is named after the Austrian composer Wolfgang Amadeus Mozart.

== History ==
=== Pre-World War II ===
In 1910, the first powered aircraft taxied on to the new race track in Salzburg-Aigen. In 1926, Deutsche Luft Hansa inaugurated the Munich-Salzburg-Bad Reichenhall route. In 1927, the Vienna-Salzburg-Innsbruck route was started by ÖLAG (Austrian Aviation AG). In one of the earlier incidents Luft Hansa, which flew the London-Brussels-Frankfurt-Munich-Vienna route with Sabena, made a forced landing in Salzburg.

=== The war years ===
At the start of World War II, on 1 September 1939, Salzburg Airport was seized and in 1943 the "Luftgaukommando VII" in Munich was put in charge of it. In the autumn of 1944 the newly developed fighter jet Messerschmitt Me 262 appeared. When the United States Air Force first bombed the city of Salzburg on 16 October 1944, with a subsequent 15 air attacks on the city, the airport remained undamaged.

=== Post war ===
On 1 August 1958, a control tower was put into operation after a 15-month construction period and a new terminal was opened in 1966.

The airport reached the target of 1,265,000 passengers in 2000, and British Airways announced flights to Salzburg from London. These flights were cancelled a year later. Also in 2001, low-cost carrier Ryanair landed at Salzburg, its first Austrian destination. This was also the first time an Austrian airport hosted a low-cost carrier. Aer Lingus commenced flights to Salzburg from Dublin for their winter schedule in 2005. In 2006, Ryanair started services to Charleroi, which ended in 2007, and Dublin.

In spring 2014, the airport's home carrier Austrian Airlines announced the closure of their ticketing and service counters at Salzburg Airport due to decreasing demand. Additional services are instead provided directly at the check-in counters.

In August 2016, German low-cost airline Eurowings announced it would open its second Austrian base in Salzburg, with flights to six European metropolitan destinations from January 2017.

In May 2020, amidst the COVID-19 pandemic, Wizz Air announced six new routes – beginning in July 2020 – creating new connections to the region. In the same time, Austrian Airlines announced the termination of their route from Salzburg to their hub at Vienna International Airport after 60 years, partially due to the heavily expanded Railjet high-speed train connections between the cities. In 2025, after a brief resumption of three routes, Wizz Air announced it would terminate all routes to Salzburg again citing high operational costs.

== Facilities ==
Salzburg Airport has a small footprint, covering only 175 hectares (432 acres) of land but has a 2,750m runway equipped to handle aircraft as large as the Boeing 747-400. Salzburg Airport consists of two passenger terminals:

- Terminal 1 is the main building, featuring 26 check-in desks, several service counters, some shops and restaurants and a visitors terrace. The airside area consists of 10 boarding gates that can be used for Schengen and non-Schengen destinations. As there are no jet bridges, walk- and bus-boarding is used. There is a business lounge operated by Salzburg Airport.
- Terminal 2 is much smaller, featuring nine additional check-in counters and four boarding gates, as well as a designated area to check in skiing equipment. It has limited passenger facilities due to its use for seasonal peak-time traffic.

== Airlines and destinations ==
The following airlines offer regular scheduled and charter flights at Salzburg Airport:

Airlines	Destinations
airBaltic	Seasonal: Riga, Tallinn
Air France	Seasonal: Paris–Charles de Gaulle
Air Serbia	Belgrade
British Airways	London–Gatwick; Seasonal: London–Heathrow
Corendon Airlines	Seasonal: Antalya, Hurghada
EasyJet	Seasonal: Amsterdam, Barcelona, Bristol, Liverpool, London–Gatwick, London–Luton, London–Southend, Naples
Eurowings	Barcelona, Berlin, Cologne/Bonn, Düsseldorf, Hamburg, Hurghada; Seasonal: Beirut, Burgas, Cagliari, Calvi, Copenhagen, Corfu, Gran Canaria, Heraklion, Ibiza, Karpathos, Kos, Lamezia Terme, Larnaca, Marsa Alam, Olbia, Palma de Mallorca, Pristina, Rhodes, Stockholm–Arlanda, Tenerife–South, Zakynthos; Seasonal Charter: Genoa
Finnair	Seasonal: Helsinki
Flydubai	Dubai–International
Flynas	Seasonal: Riyadh
Icelandair	Seasonal: Reykjavík–Keflavík
Israir	Seasonal: Tel Aviv
Jet2.com	Seasonal: Belfast–International, Birmingham, Edinburgh, Leeds/Bradford, London–Gatwick (begins 26 December 2026), London–Stansted, Manchester
Lufthansa	Frankfurt; Seasonal: London–Heathrow
Norwegian Air Shuttle	Seasonal: Copenhagen, Oslo, Stockholm–Arlanda
Nouvelair	Seasonal: Monastir
Pegasus Airlines	Seasonal: Antalya
Ryanair	Alicante, London–Stansted; Seasonal: Birmingham, Dublin, Manchester
Scandinavian Airlines	Copenhagen
Sky Alps	Seasonal: Rome–Fiumicino
Sundor	Seasonal: Tel Aviv
Transavia	Amsterdam; Seasonal: Brussels, Eindhoven, Rotterdam/The Hague
TUI Airways	Seasonal: Belfast–International, Birmingham, Bristol, Cardiff, Glasgow, London–Gatwick, Manchester, Newcastle upon Tyne
Turkish Airlines	Istanbul

== Statistics ==
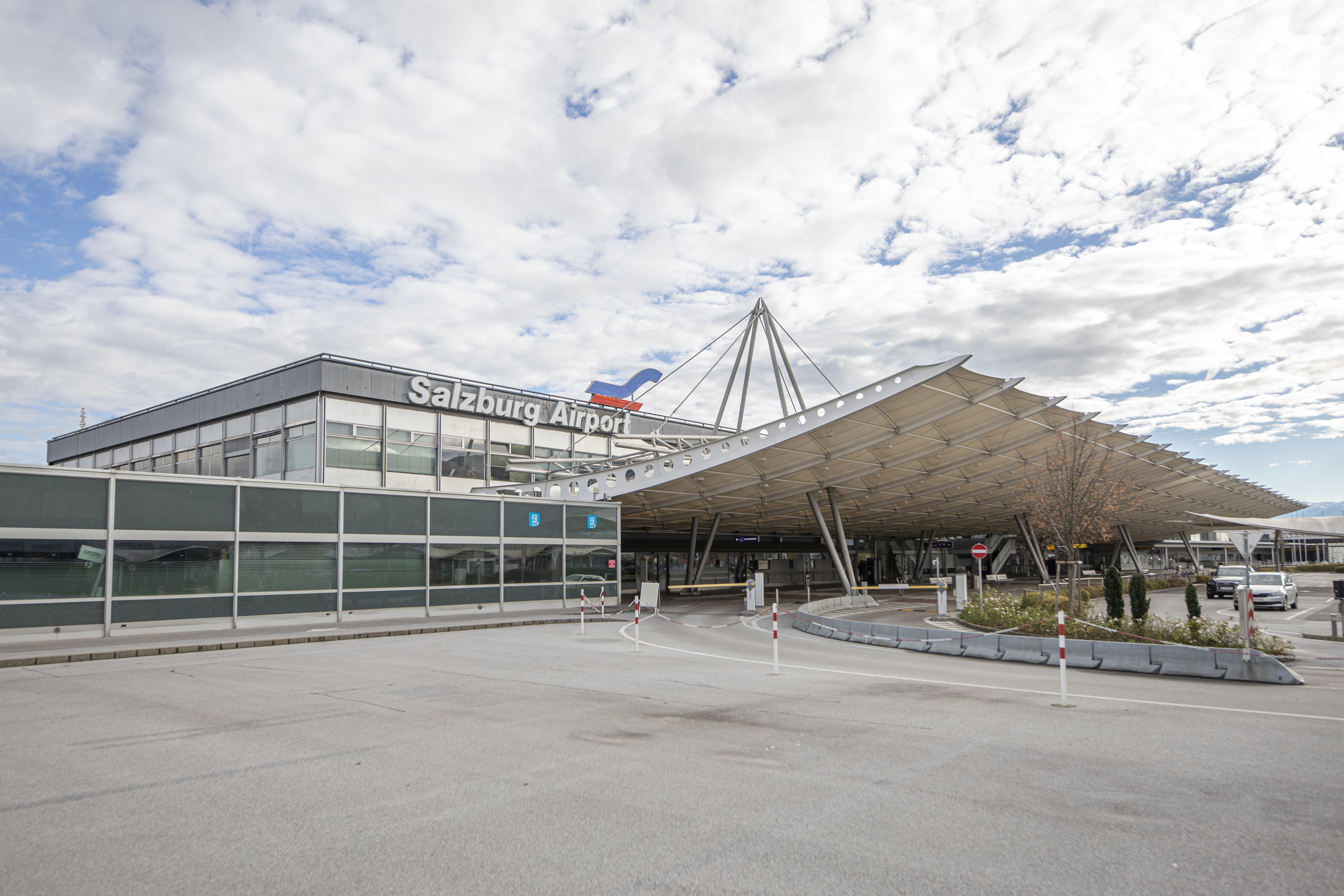
Terminal exterior

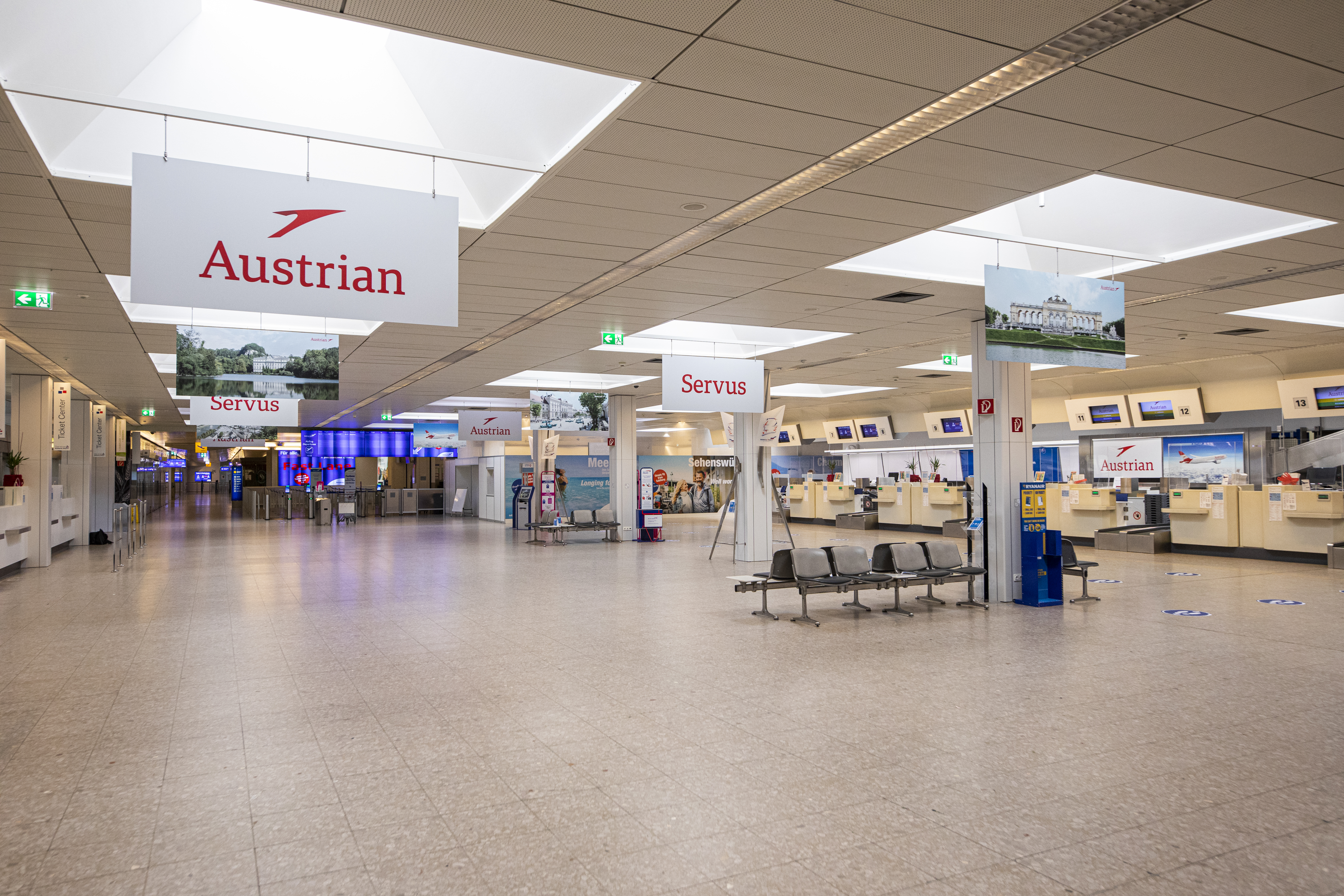
Terminal interior

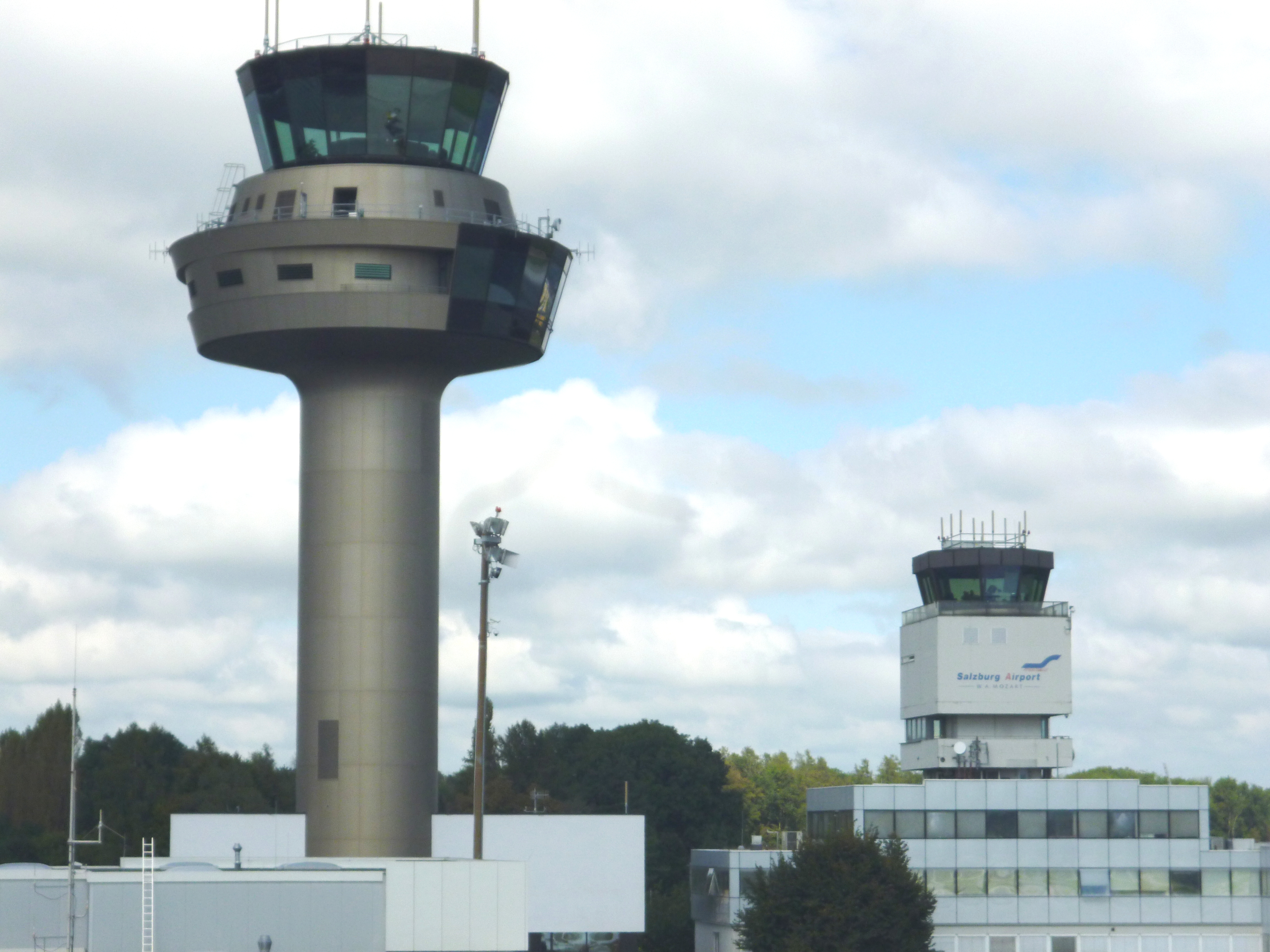
Air traffic control tower

Passenger statistics
Year	Passengers	Change
2005	1,695,430	
2006	1,878,266	▲10.8%
2007	1,946,422	▲3.6%
2008	1,809,601	▼7.1%
2009	1,552,154	▼14.3%
2010	1,625,842	▲4.8%
2011	1,700,989	▲4.6%
2012	1,666,487	▼3.0%
2013	1,662,834	▼0.2%
2014	1,819,520	▲9.4%
2015	1,828,309	▲0.5%
2016	1,739,288	▼5.1%
2017	1,890,164	▲8.7%
2018	1,844,362	▼2.5%
2019	1,717,991	▼7.4%
2020	669,790	▼61.0%
2021	299,846	▼55.2%
2022	1,229,495	▲410.0%
2023	1,604,601	▲31.3%
2024	1,787,169	▲11.4%
2025	1,774,454	▼0.7%

== Ground transport ==
The airport is located 3 km from the city centre. Salzburg trolleybus lines 2 and 10, each with service every 10 minutes, connect the airport to the rest of Salzburg's public transport system. The main station is reachable in about 25 minutes and the inner city in about 30 minutes.

== See also ==
- Transport in Austria
- List of airports in Austria
