= Trolleybuses in Salzburg =

Transit system in Salzburg, Austria

Coordinates: 47°48′N 13°02′E

Salzburg trolleybus system
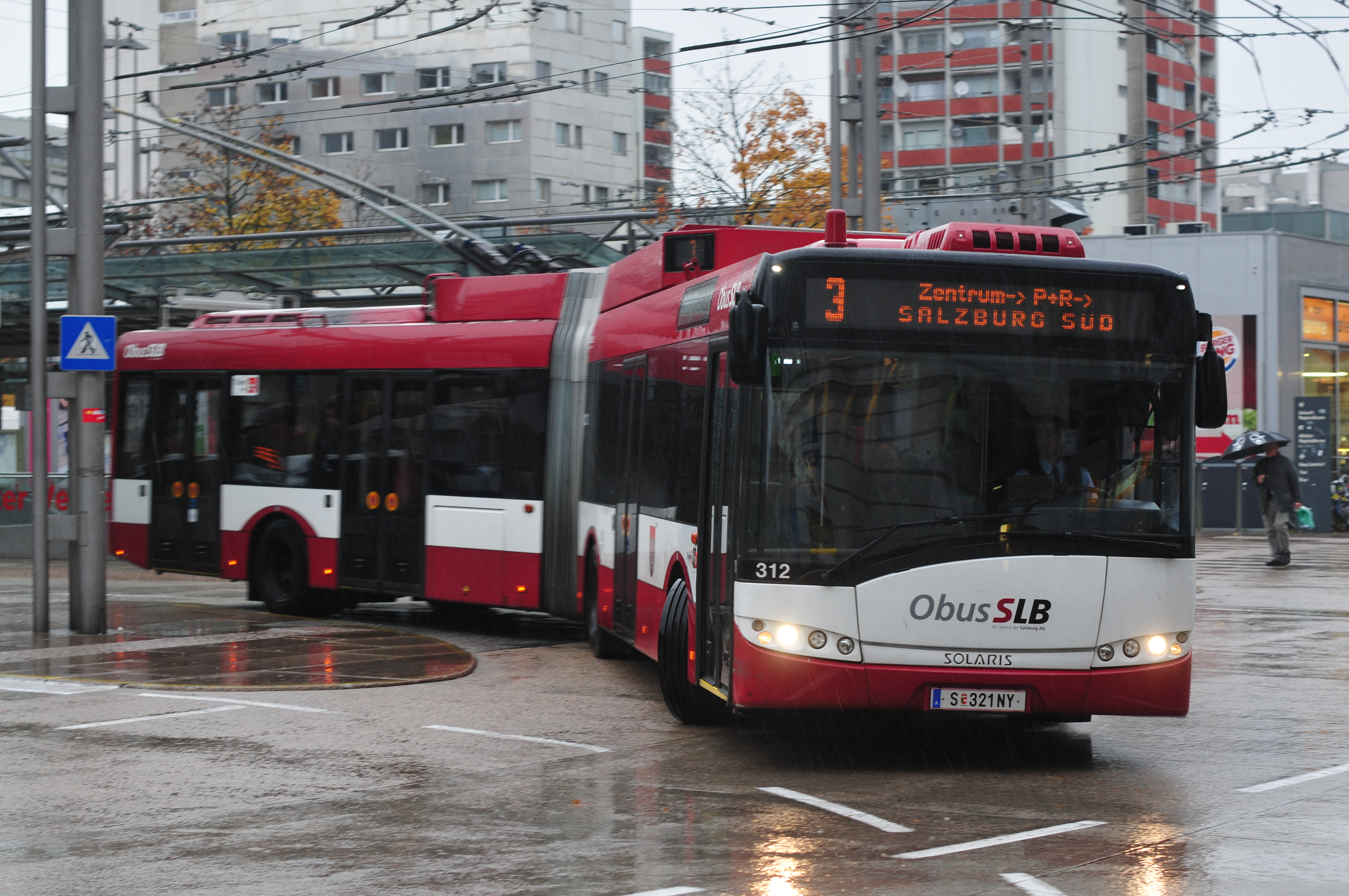
- A Solaris Cegelec Trollino 18 in Salzburg, 2012

Operation
- Locale: Salzburg, Austria
- Open: 1940
- Status: Open
- Routes: 12 (1, 2, 3, 4, 5, 6, 7, 8, 9, 10, 12, 14)
- Owner: Salzburg AG
- Operator: Salzburg AG

Infrastructure
- Electrification: 600 V DC
- Depot: 1
- Stock: 118 articulated trolleybuses

Statistics
- Route length: 146.45 km (91.00 mi)
Overview
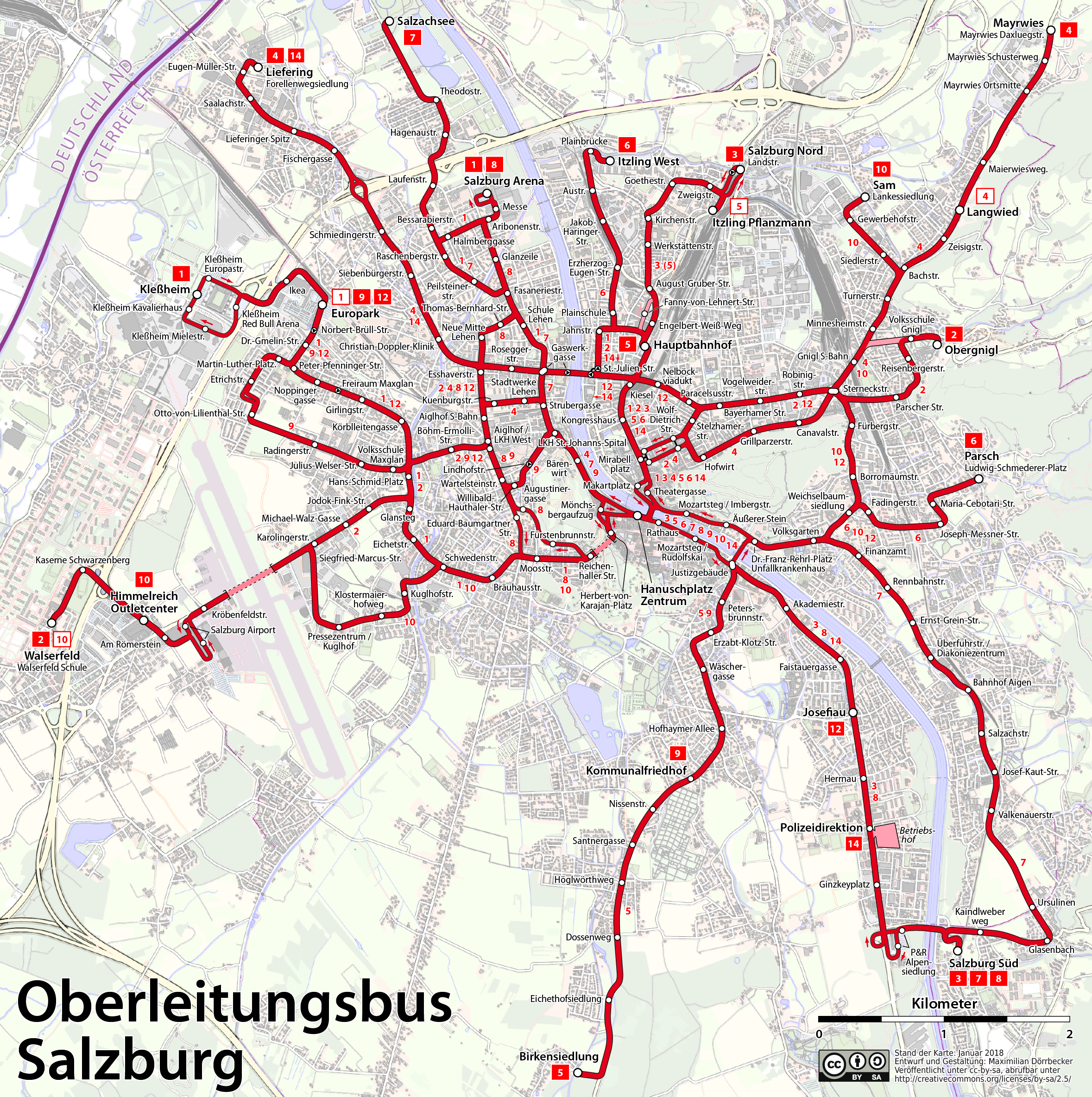
Salzburg trolleybus system map, 2017
- Website: https://web.archive.org/web/20100127024936/http://www.salzburg-ag.at/verkehr/stadtbus Salzburg AG (in German)

The Salzburg trolleybus system forms part of the public transport network serving Salzburg, capital of the federal state of Salzburg in Austria. Opened on 1 October 1940, it replaced the Salzburg tramway network.

One of only two such systems currently operating in Austria, the Salzburg trolleybus system is one of the largest trolleybus systems in western Europe. It presently carries 41 million passengers each year.

Together with the Salzburger Lokalbahn, the system is currently operated by Salzburg AG, which markets it under the name StadtBus Salzburg. It is also integrated into the Salzburger Verkehrsverbund fare collection system. Along with the Salzburg S-Bahn, it forms the backbone of Salzburg's public transport network; the city's diesel bus network, operated by Albus Salzburg, plays only a minor role.

== History ==
On 1 October 1940, trolleybus service was introduced in Salzburg, on the Siegmundsplatz–Maxglan route, which is now part of line 1. A few days later, on 24 October 1940, the extension to Makartplatz followed, and on 10 November 1940, the line was further extended, to Salzburg Hauptbahnhof. On 16 February 1942, the ring lines M and L (Maxglan–Lehen–Hauptbahnhof–Zentrum–Maxglan) came into operation. In the following years, the Salzburg trolleybus system recorded rapid growth, but the tramway network was destroyed.

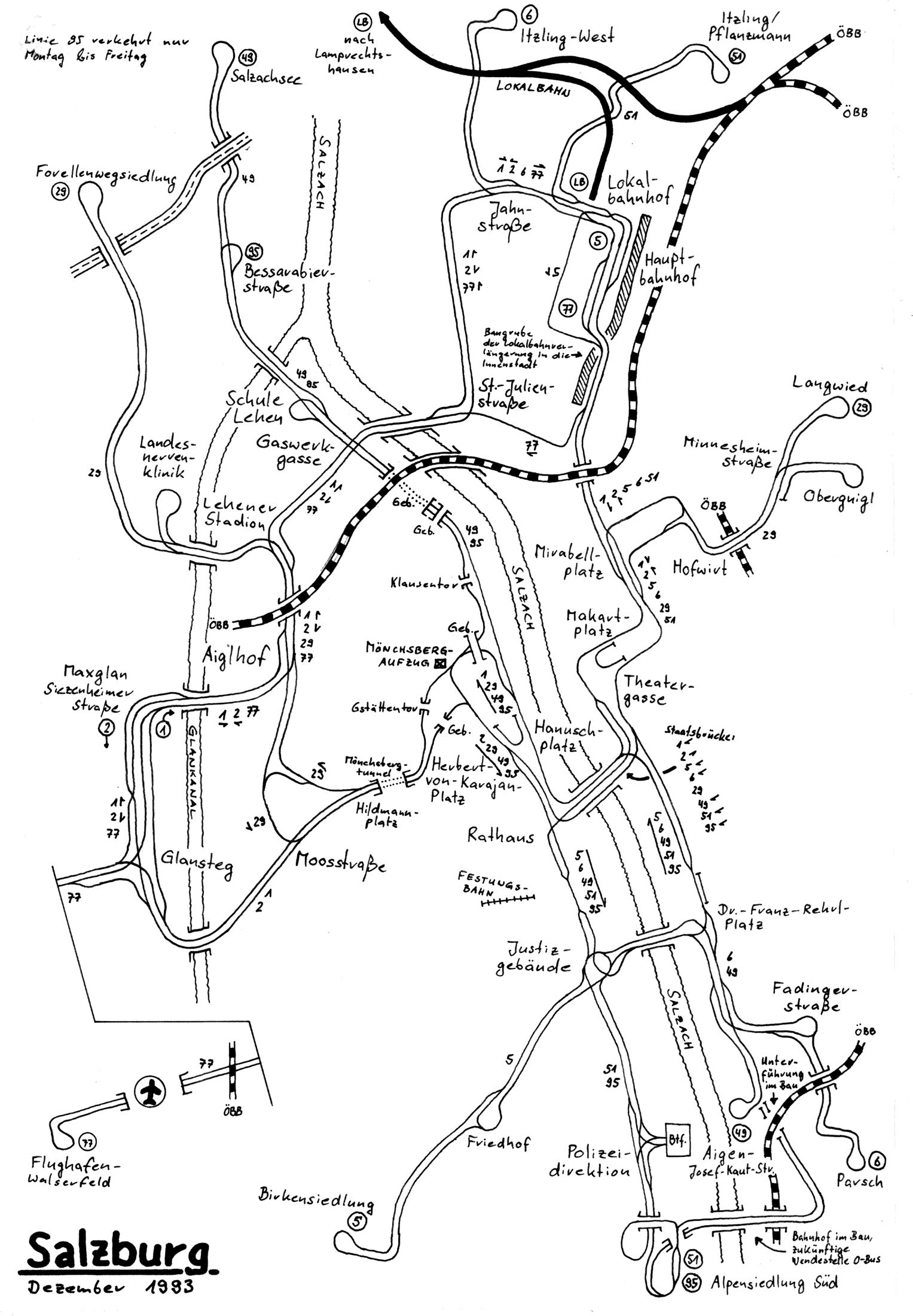
System map, 1993

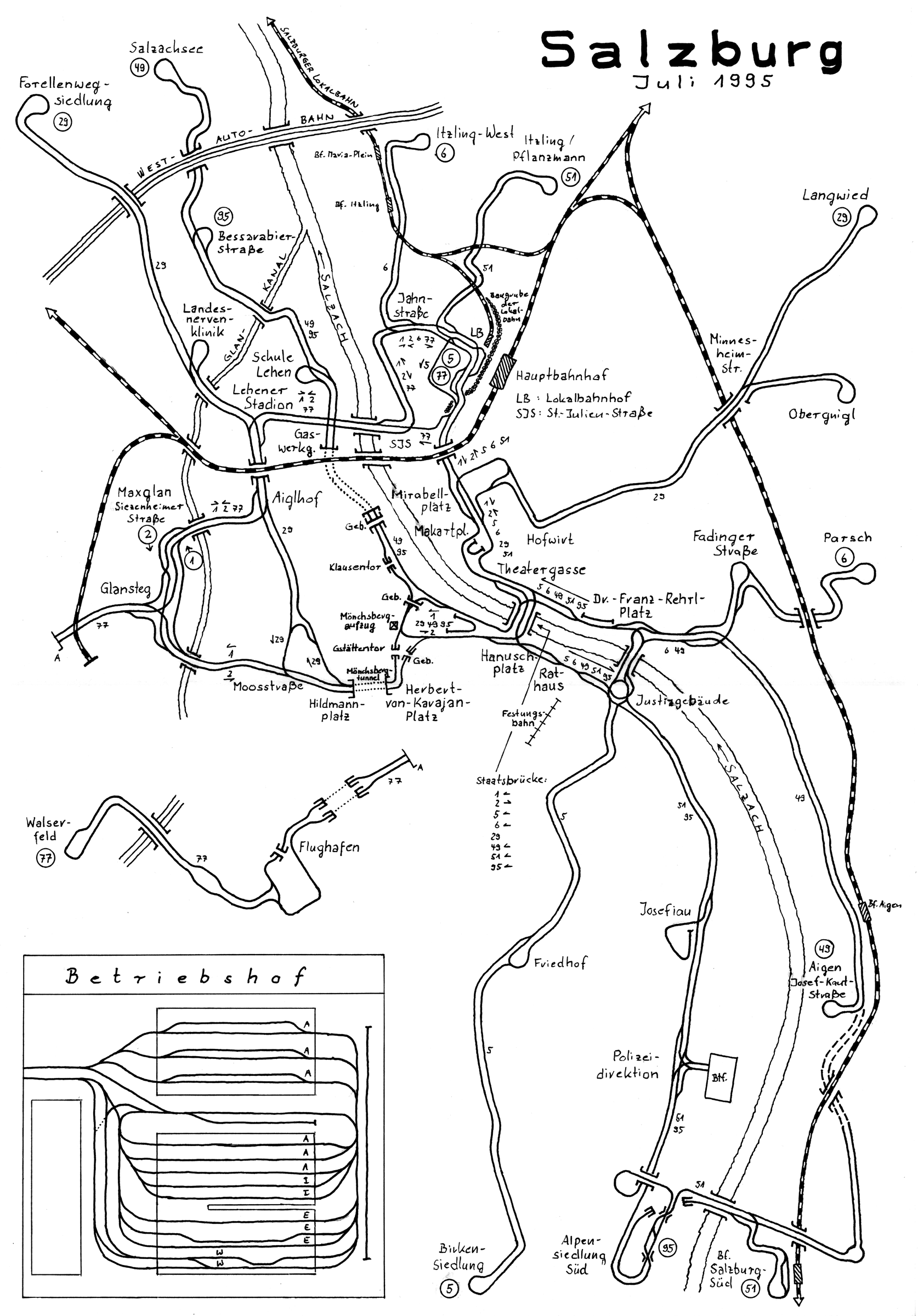
System map, 1995

Until the merger in 2000 of the Salzburger Stadtwerke with the SAFE (Salzburger AG für Energiewirtschaft) to create the Salzburg AG, the Salzburg trolleybus system, and the local railway line to Lamprechtshausen, were operated by the Salzburger Stadtwerke - Verkehrsbetriebe. Some diesel bus lines also originally belonged to the company, but in the course of the 2000 merger these were transferred to Albus Salzburg.

Since 2000, therefore, the trolleybus and diesel bus services have been fully separated, both organisationally and operationally. It follows that Salzburg AG is one of the few transport companies worldwide that operates trolleybus lines, but no diesel bus lines.

In 2004, trolleybus line 1 was extended about 500 m (1,600 ft) from Messezentrum to Salzburgarena. Unusually, however, the new terminal was served only during events. At other times, power to the overhead lines in this area is switched off; the status of the overhead lines is displayed to the trolleybus drivers by means of a signal light.

On 1 October 2005, line 1 was extended from Europark to Kavaliershaus, via the EM-Stadion. On 11 December 2005, the extension of line 2 came into operation from the Hauptbahnhof to Obergnigl via Mirabellplatz and the Sterneckstraße.

A non-revenue section of overhead line from the Versorgungshausstraße (line 2) via the Fürbergstraße to the Fadingerstraße was built in the spring of 2006. Especially during events in the city centre, and during the UCI Road World Championships 2006, it has been used intensively. Since then, the trolleybuses of lines 2 and 4 have operated on and off over this route. This section was the basis for the later electrification of the former Albus line 20.

Also, until September 2006 the Gaswerkgasse / Ignaz-Harrer-Strasse intersection, and the Hauptbahnhof area around the Forum-Kaufhaus/Fanny-von-Lehnert-Straße, were provided with additional turning and reversing capabilities. Likewise, since the spring of 2007 a non-revenue section has been in operation from the Landeskrankenhaus (line 7) to Willibald-Hauthaler-Straße (Line 4), and an additional turning space has been provided at the Makartplatz, in front of the Holy Trinity Church. A new turning facility on the Aiglhofkreuzung from line 4 to line 2 was created in spring 2008, as well as a dedicated lane for trolleybuses in the Griesgasse in the city centre. The latter allows the stacking-and-demand retrieval of trolleybuses in the city centre for events. With the timetable change on 7 December 2007, line 4 was extended from Langwied over the city boundary to Mayrwies, replacing bus line 4A.

In autumn 2008, the Salzburg Municipal Council decided to electrify the branch of bus line 20 to Sam / Lankessiedlung. The route follows that of line 20 from Lankessiedlung, via the Salzburg-Gnigl S-Bahn station, Fuggerstraße, Volksgarten, Hanuschplatz to the Landeskrankenhaus; the line leads back to Hanuschplatz and to Sam, via Edward-Baumgartner-Straße and Karajanplatz. This work was completed in mid-2009, and bus line 20 became trolleybus line 10.

On 9 July 2009, lines 3 and 5 were extended by 500 m (1,600 ft) to the new Itzling Pflanzmann terminus. These were the first privately financed trolleybus sections in Salzburg.

== Lines ==
The eleven lines of the present Salzburg trolleybus system are as follows:

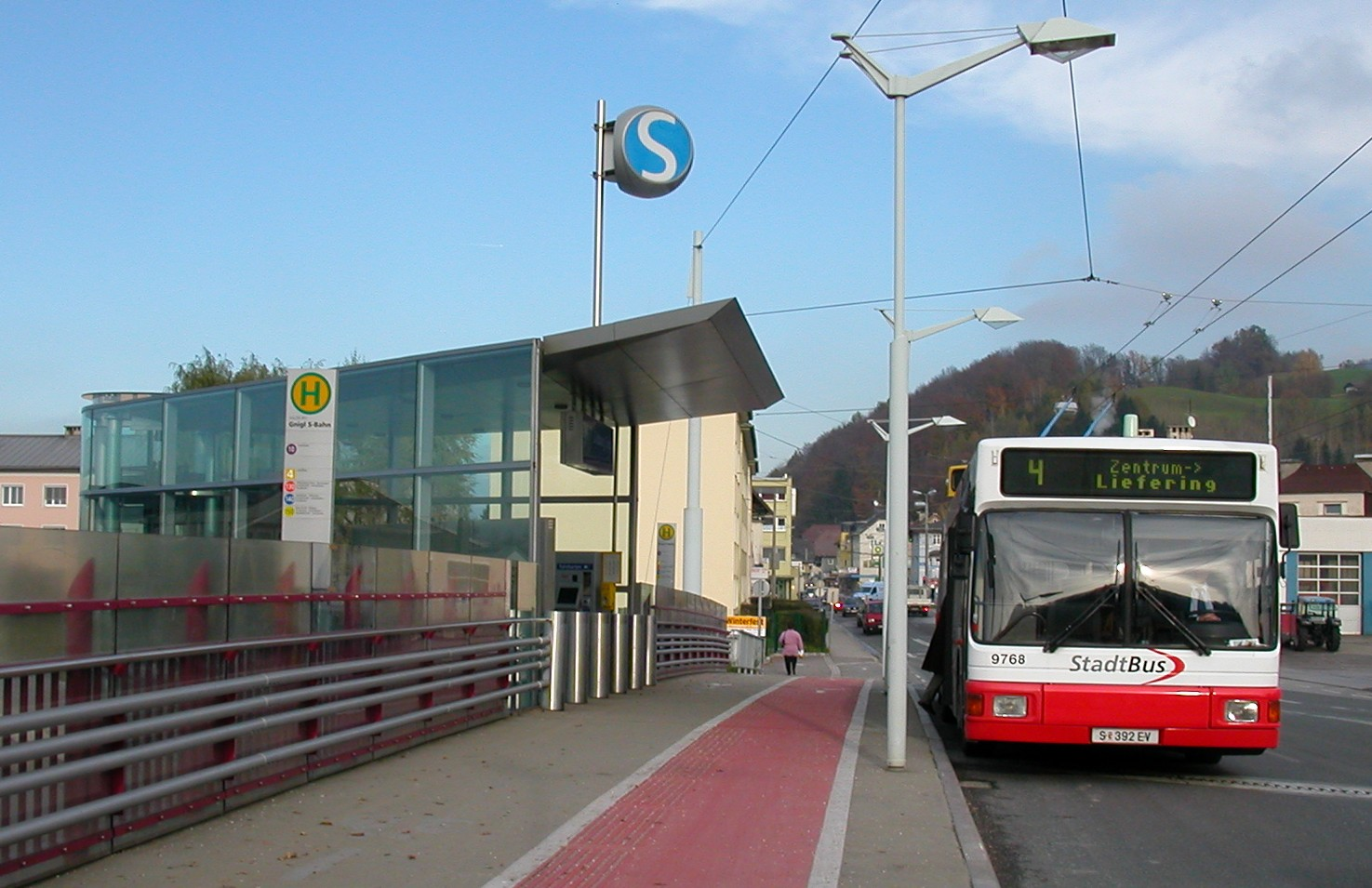
Interchange between line 4 and the Salzburg S-Bahn at Gnigl, 2004

1	(Kleßheim, Red Bull Arena –) Europark – Karajanplatz – Hanuschplatz – Mirabellplatz – Hauptbahnhof – Messe, Salzburgarena	
2	Walserfeld – Salzburg Airport – Hauptbahnhof – Mirabellplatz – Obergnigl	from 1986 to 2003 part of Line 77
3	Salzburg Süd – Josefiau – Mozartsteg – Mirabellplatz – Hauptbahnhof – Salzburg Nord	from 1986 to 2003 Line 51
4	(Mayrwies –) Langwied – Mirabellplatz – Hanuschplatz – Landeskrankenhaus – Liefering	from 1986 to 2003 Line 29 or 29A
5	(Grödig, Untersbergbahn –) Birkensiedlung – Mozartsteg – Mirabellplatz – Hauptbahnhof (– Itzling Pflanzmann)	
6	Parsch – Mozartsteg – Mirabellplatz – Hauptbahnhof – Itzling West	
7	Salzburg Süd – Aigen – Mozartsteg – Hanuschplatz – Landeskrankenhaus – Salzachsee	from 1986 to 2003 Line 49
8	Salzburg Süd – Josefiau – Mozartsteg – Hanuschplatz – Karajanplatz – Aiglhof – Messe, Salzburgarena	from 1986 to 2003 part of Line 95
9	Europark – Landeskrankenhaus – Hanuschplatz – Mozartsteg – Justizgebäude (– Kommunalfriedhof)	Formerly bus line 20
10	Sam – Volksgarten – Mozartsteg – Hanuschplatz – Karajanplatz – Salzburg Airport – Walserfeld	
12	Josefiau – Volksgarten – Nelböckviadukt, Hauptbahnhof – Aiglhof – Europark	
14	Polizeidirektion – Josefiau – Mozartsteg – Mirabellplatz – Hauptbahnhof – Liefering (only Mon–Fri morning)	

== Projects ==
In October 2010, plans for new extensions were presented. It is proposed to run line 10 through the Strubergasse in future, and thereby provide a better connection with the Struber barracks. Additionally, by means of a branch in the Karolingerstrasse, line 8 will serve the many businesses and residents in that district. The city of Salzburg plans to invest around €2.2 million in these two projects up to 2015.

For quite some time, an extension to Eugendorf, or a cross-border line to Freilassing in Germany, have also been discussed.

In December 2016, diesel bus line 20 will be converted to trolleybus line 9 with a new 2.2 kilometres (1.4 mi) route in the East of Salzburg.

== Fleet ==
=== Former fleet ===
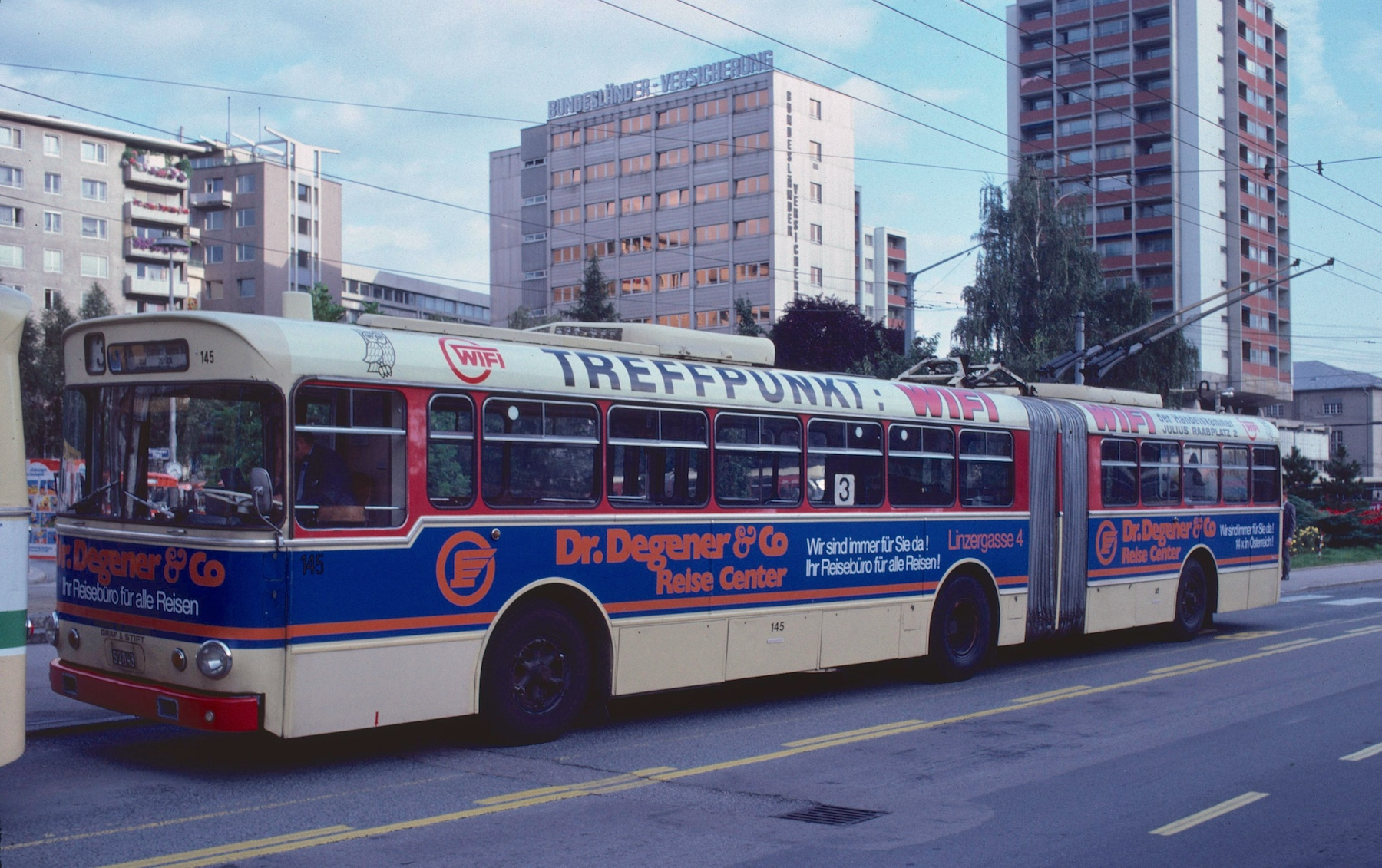
1966-built Gräf & Stift articulated trolleybus 145 at Hauptbahnhof in 1983

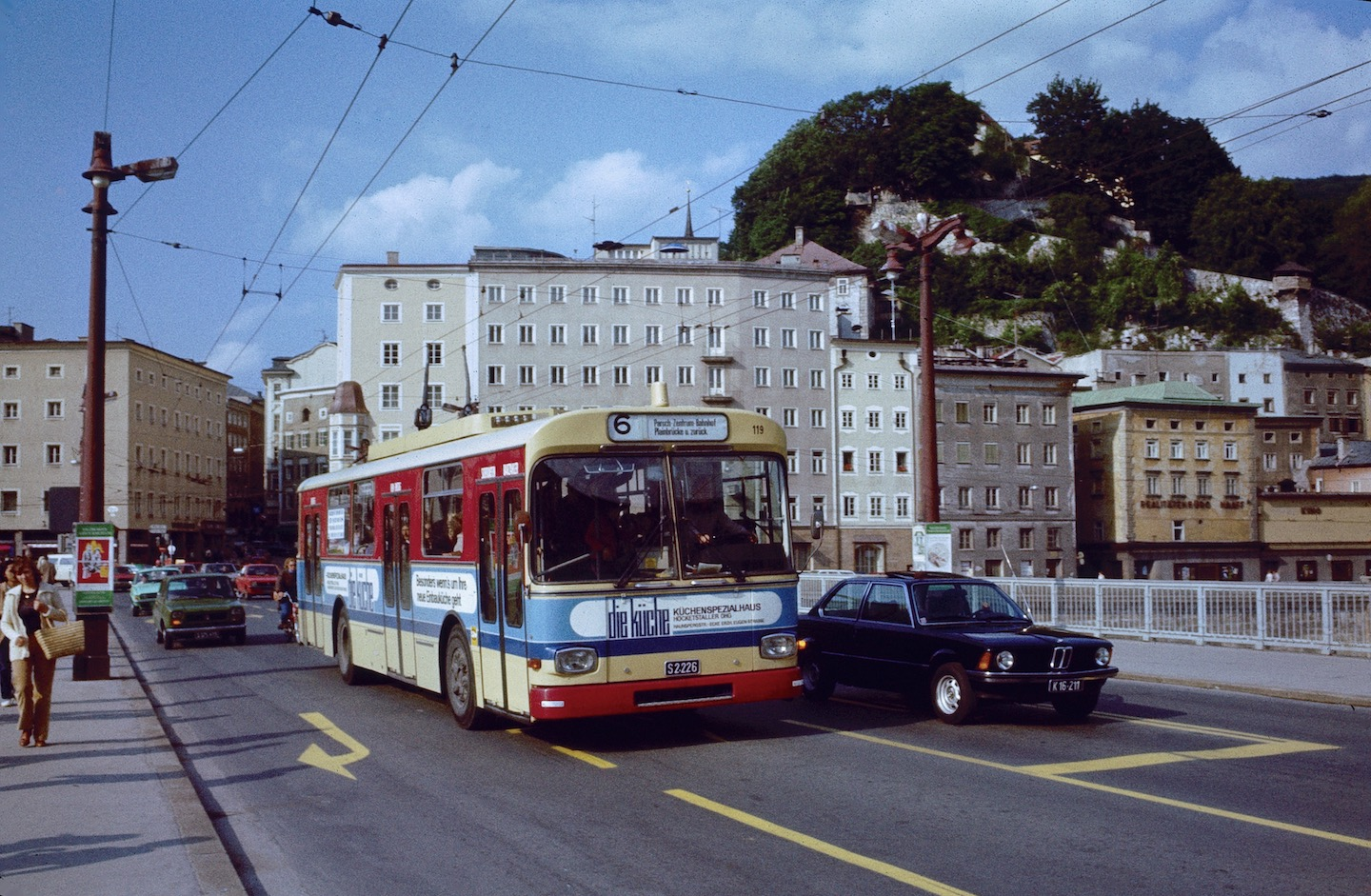
1977-built Gräf & Stift standard trolleybus no. 119 on the Staatsbrücke in 1980

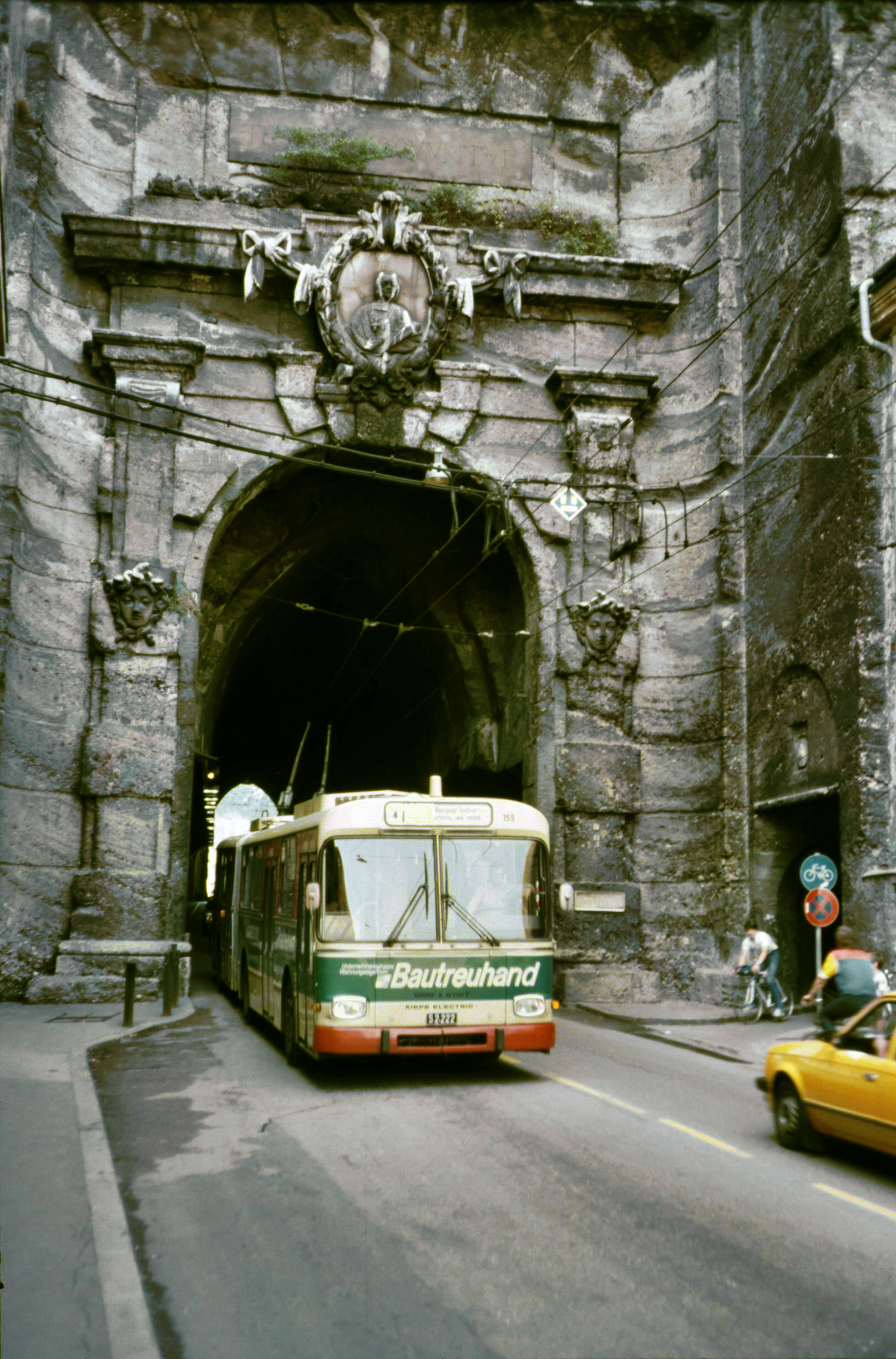
Gräf & Stift articulated bus no. 159 passes through the Sigmundstor, 1983

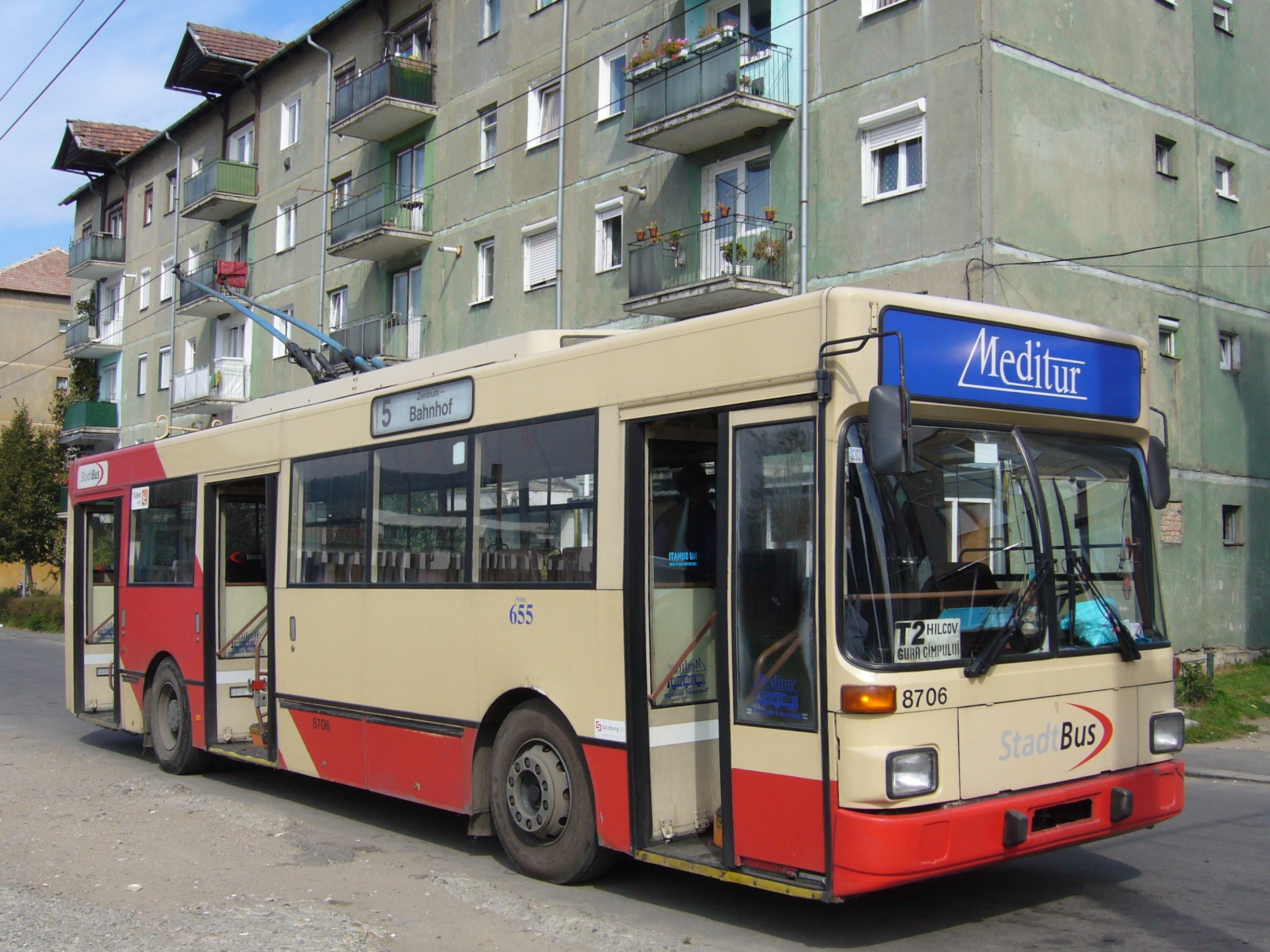
Gräf & Stift-built former no. 106 (Type OE 112 M 11, built 1987), in Mediaș in 2007

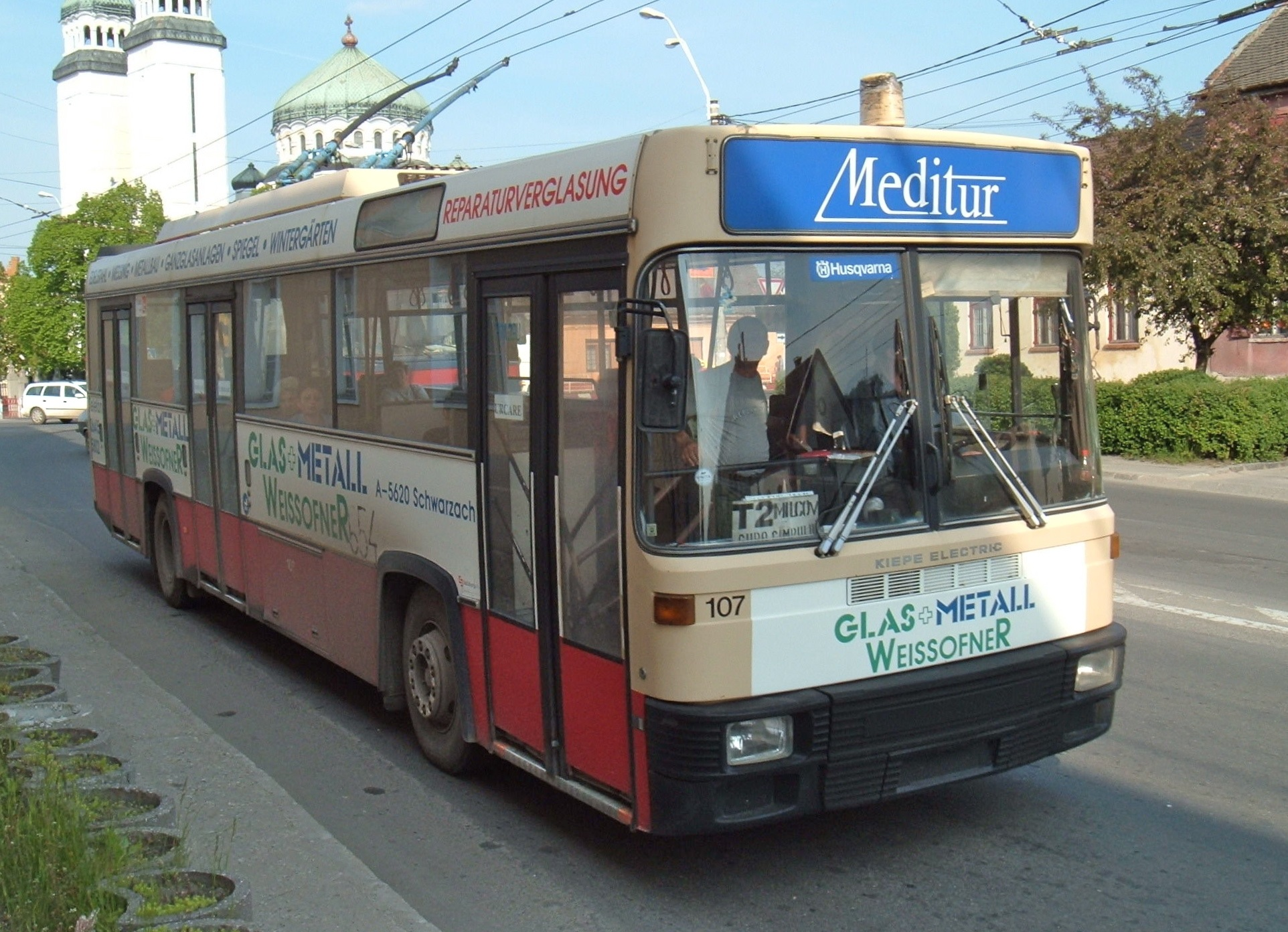
Steyr-built former no. 107 (built 1988), also in Mediaș, in 2008

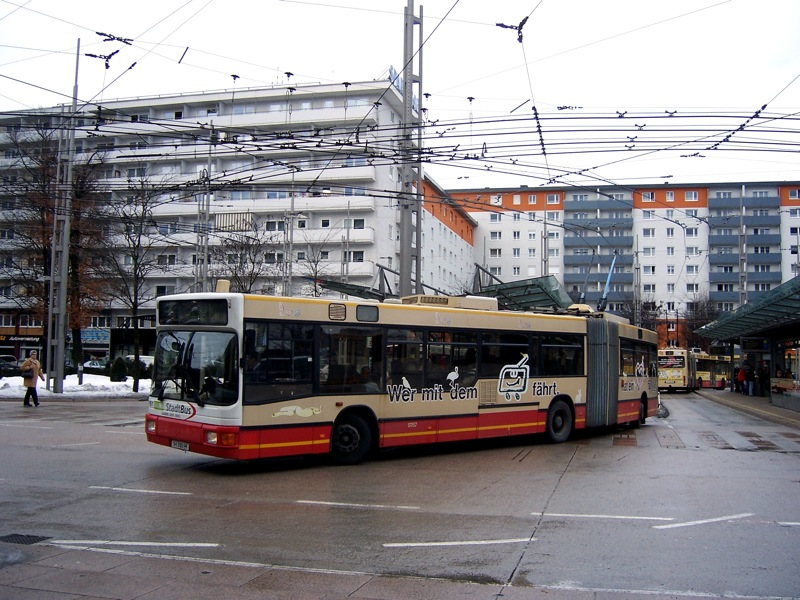
An MAN NGT 204 M 16, outside Salzburg Hbf

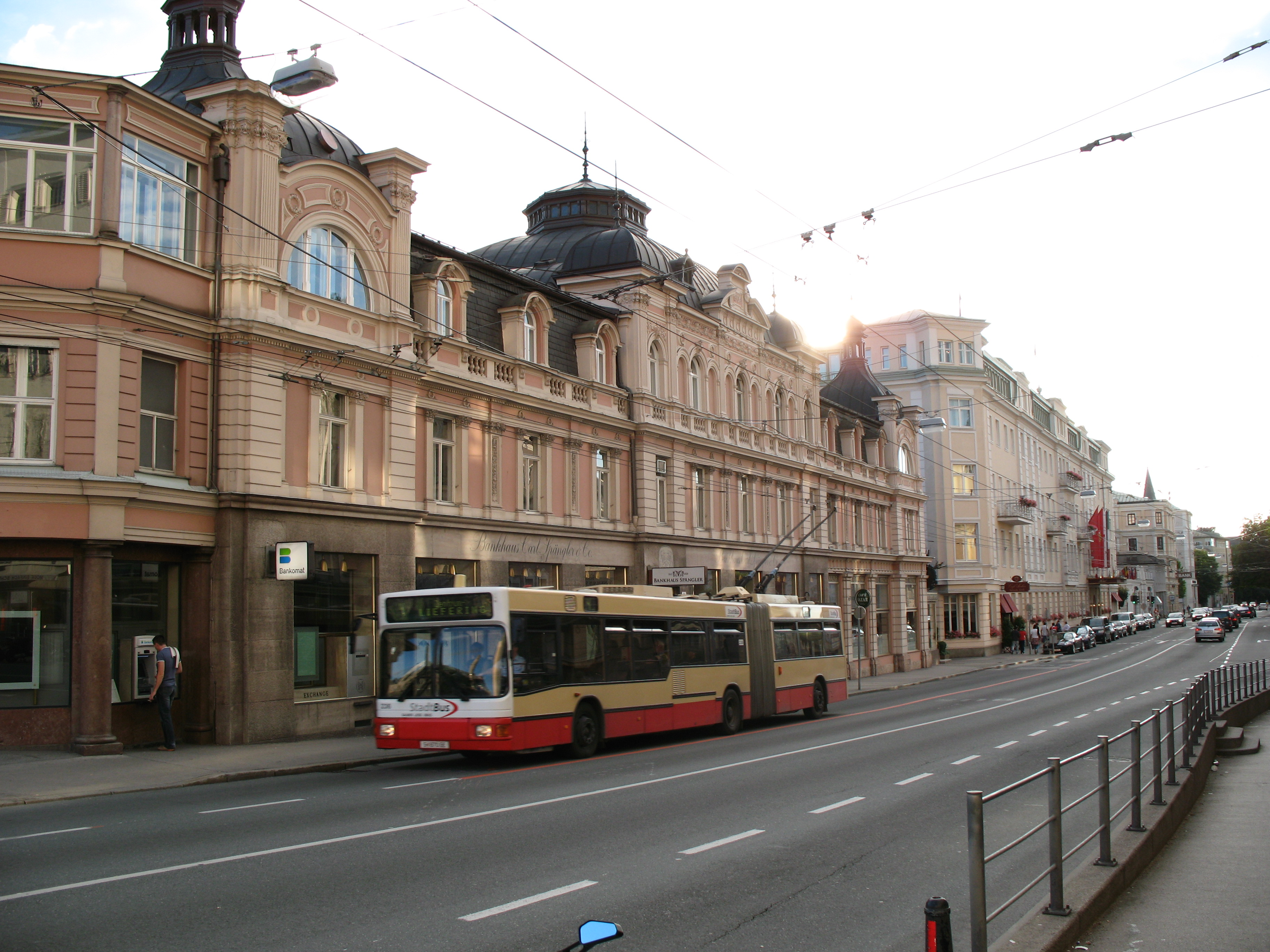
A similar vehicle in the Schwarzstraße

For many years until about 2000, almost all of the trolleybuses operating on the Salzburg system were made either by the German company MAN or its Austrian counterpart Gräf & Stift. After the former company took over the latter in 1971, the Gräf & Stift name remained in use as an MAN brand for the Austrian market and for trolleybuses until 2001, when ÖAF-Gräf & Stift AG was renamed MAN Sonderfahrzeuge AG. With the gradual retirement of Gräf & Stift vehicles after the start of the 21st century, the proportion of the fleet represented by MAN/Gräf & Stift vehicles became smaller and smaller, until retirement of the last such vehicles in 2016.

Some of the retired Salzburg vehicles were sold to other trolleybus operators. By that means, former Salzburg trolleybuses later entered service on the since-closed trolleybus system in Kapfenberg, Austria, and also in Germany (Eberswalde), Lithuania (Vilnius), Romania (Mediaş and Timișoara) and Russia (Perm and Rybinsk).

Until 1975, trolleybuses also operated with trailers. Salzburg was the last trolleybus network in Austria in which this form of operation was to be found. There were four different models of trailer available. They were made by Gräf & Stift (type OA I), Kässbohrer (without model designation), Lohner (type OM 5/1) and Schumann (without model designation).

The first low-floor trolleybuses to be added to the system were the 23 MAN articulated vehicles constructed between 1994 and 1997. One of them, fleet no. 240, was a used vehicle acquired from Kapfenberg. The remainder of the fleet continued to be high-floor vehicles until 2000.

The last two-axle trolleybuses still used in regular service were retired around the end of 2003. These were the last of eight Steyr-built vehicles that were built in 1988. One of the Steyr vehicles, no. 109, was preserved as a heritage vehicles, and for a period starting in September 2005 it ran in regular service again, but as a special vehicle making only a single trip per day in the morning peak period. In 2005, the fleet totalled 92 vehicles.

The last high-floor vehicles in the active fleet, apart from heritage vehicles used only for special services, were retired in July 2016. These were Gräf & Stift articulated trolleybuses built between 1988 and 1994, nos. 200–228. One, fleet no. 220, was bought secondhand from the Kapfenberg trolleybus system.

More new low-floor trolleybuses were purchased from Van Hool in 2000, from Solaris in 2009, and Hess in the 2010s. See "Current fleet" section, below.

=== Table of former fleet ===
Numbers	Quantity	Manufacturer	Model no.	Configuration	Entered service	Last units retired	Notes
101–110	10	MAN / Schumann	MPE I	Standard (two-axle)	1940	1967	
114–117	4	Vétra	CS 60	Standard (two-axle)	1941	1943	
111–120	10	MAN / Schumann	MPE II	Standard (two-axle)	1942	1966	
111–116	6	Gräf & Stift	EO I	Standard (two-axle)	1948	1974	
117	1	MAN / Gräf & Stift	EO I	Standard (two-axle)	1951	1971	
118–120	3	MAN / Gräf & Stift	EO II	Standard (two-axle)	1956	1970	
121–123	3	Uerdingen / Henschel	ÜHIIIs	Standard (two-axle)	1956	1976	
124–128	5	Henschel	HS 160 OSL-G	Articulated	1961	1979	
129–135	7	Gräf & Stift	GEO II	Articulated	1961	1980	Originally numbered 136–142; renumbered in 1965.
136–140	5	Gräf & Stift	GE 105/54/57	Articulated	1964	1983	Originally numbered 146–150; renumbered in 1965.
141–147	7	Gräf & Stift	GE 105/54/54	Articulated	1966	1984	
148–152	5	Gräf & Stift	GE 105/54/54/1	Articulated	1970	1987	
101–102	2	Gräf & Stift	OE 105/54	Standard (two-axle)	1971	1986	
103–112	10	Gräf & Stift	OE 110/54/2	Standard (two-axle)	1971	1990	
153–154	2	Gräf & Stift	GE 105/54/54/2	Articulated	1972	1989	
113–123	11	Gräf & Stift	OE 110/54/A	Standard (two-axle)	1975	1993	
155–160	6	Gräf & Stift	GE 110/54/57/A	Articulated	1976	1992	
161	1	Gräf & Stift	GE 150 M 16	Articulated	1979	1993	Induction motor
129–147, 162–178	36	Gräf & Stift	GE 110 M 16	Articulated	1978–85	2002	No. 178 now a heritage vehicle.
101–106	6	Gräf & Stift	OE 112 M 11	Standard (two-axle)	1986	2002	
107–110	4	Steyr	STS 11 HU	Standard (two-axle)	1989	2003	No. 109 now a heritage vehicle.
111–114	4	Steyr	STS 11 HU 140	Standard (two-axle)	1990	2003	
179–188, 200–228	36	Gräf & Stift	GE 112 M 16	Articulated	1986	2016	No. 220 now a heritage vehicle.
229–252	23	Gräf & Stift/MAN	NGT 204 M16	Articulated	1994	2021	240 = ex-Kapfenberg no. 35, in the fleet since 2003. No. 236 now a heritage vehicle.
259–260	2	Van Hool	AG 300 T	Articulated	2008	2014	Formerly VMCV nos. 2 and 15, in the fleet since 2009, without automatic current collector.
316–319	4	Solaris	Trollino 18	Articulated	2013	2024	Formerly La Chaux-de-Fonds, Switzerland, nos. 141–144, built in 2005 and acquired in 2013.

=== Current fleet ===
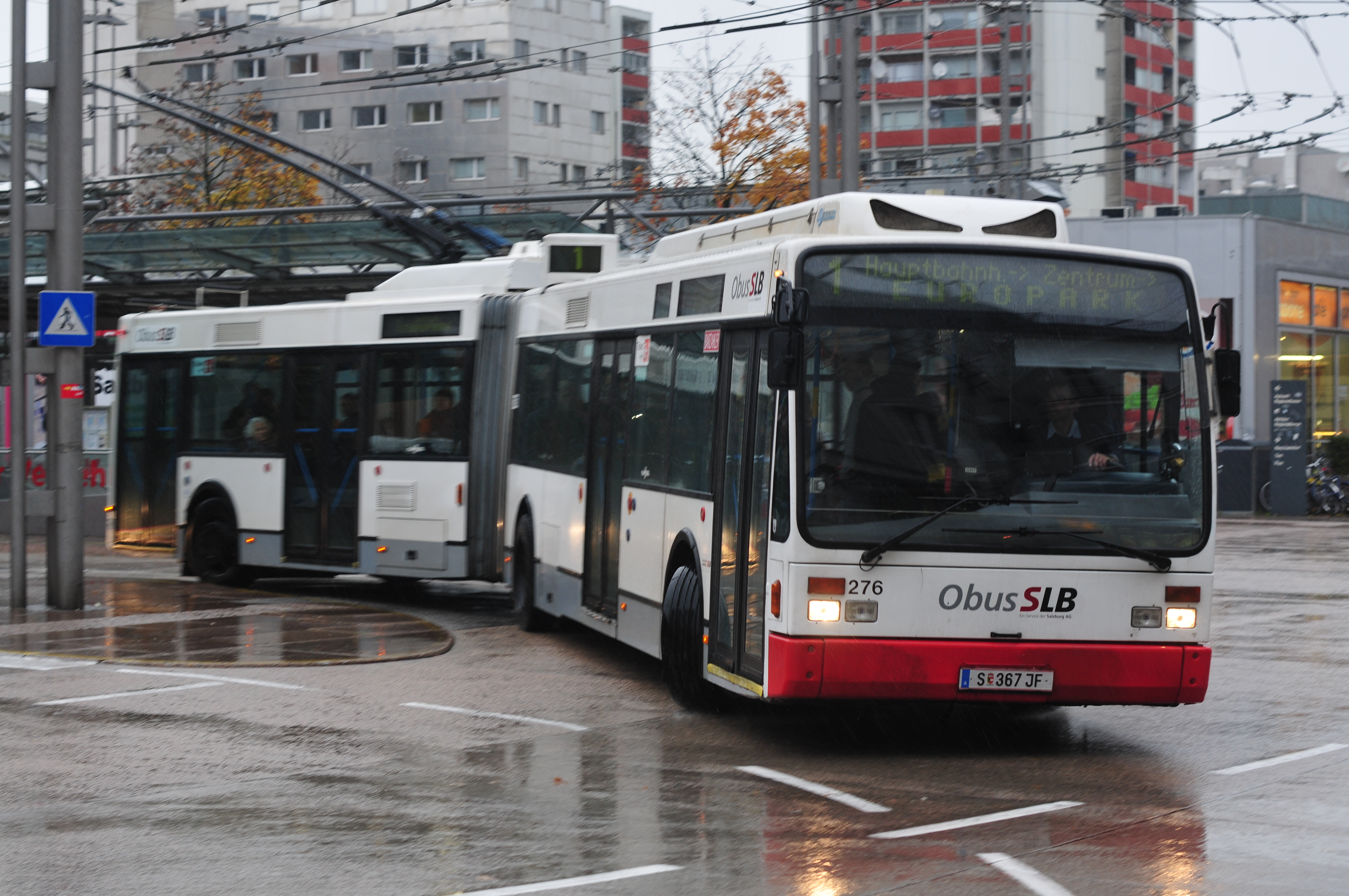
A Van Hool AG300T on route 1 in 2012

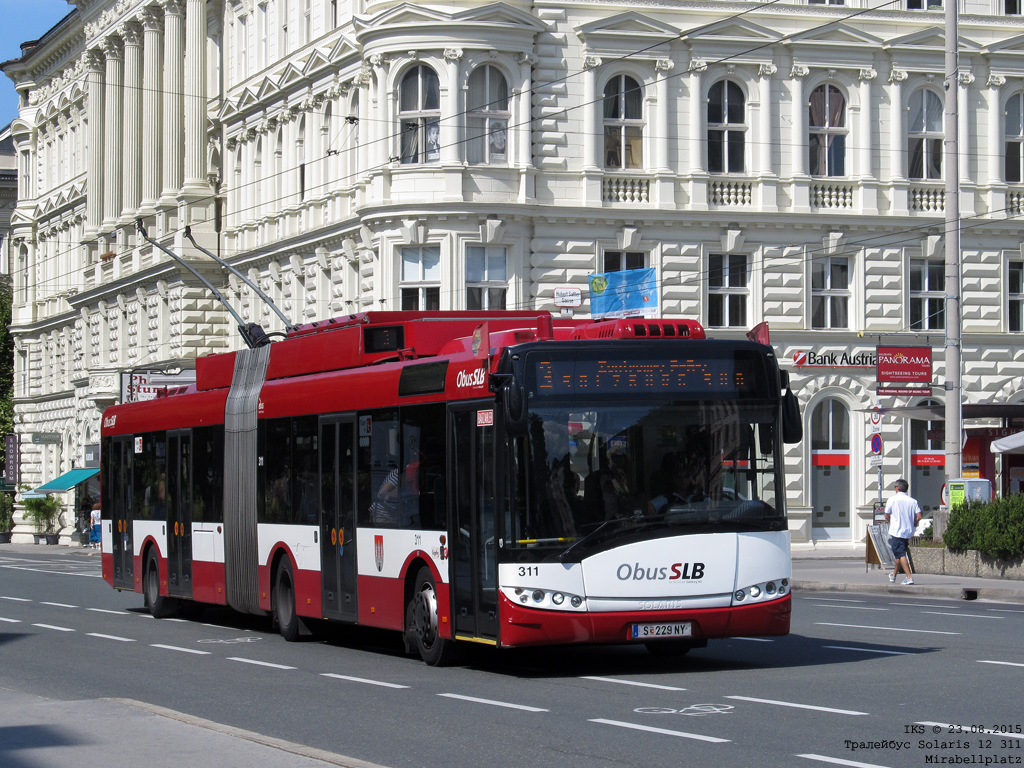
Solaris Trollino 18 no. 311 in 2015

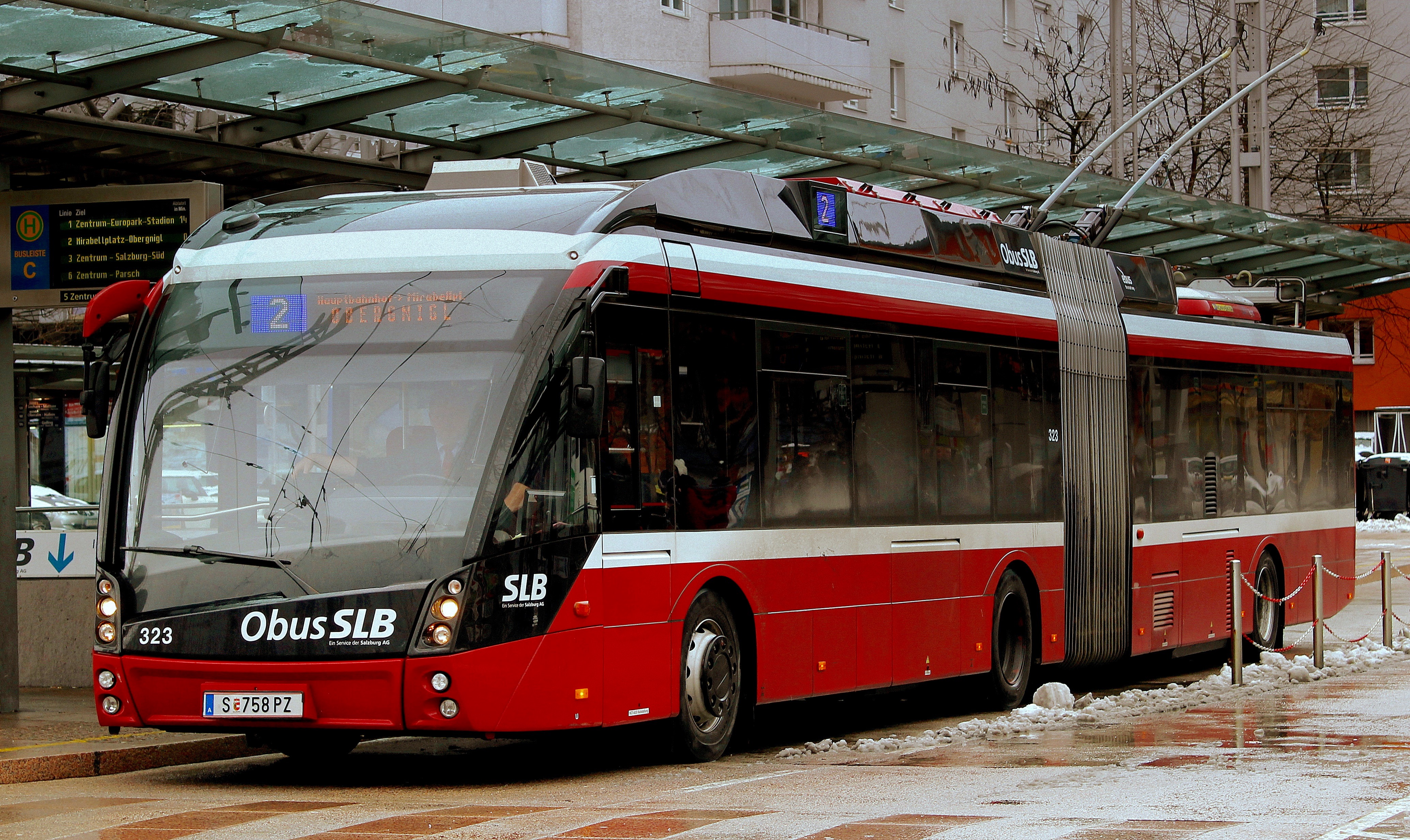
One of the Solaris Trollino "MetroStyle" trolleybuses in 2014

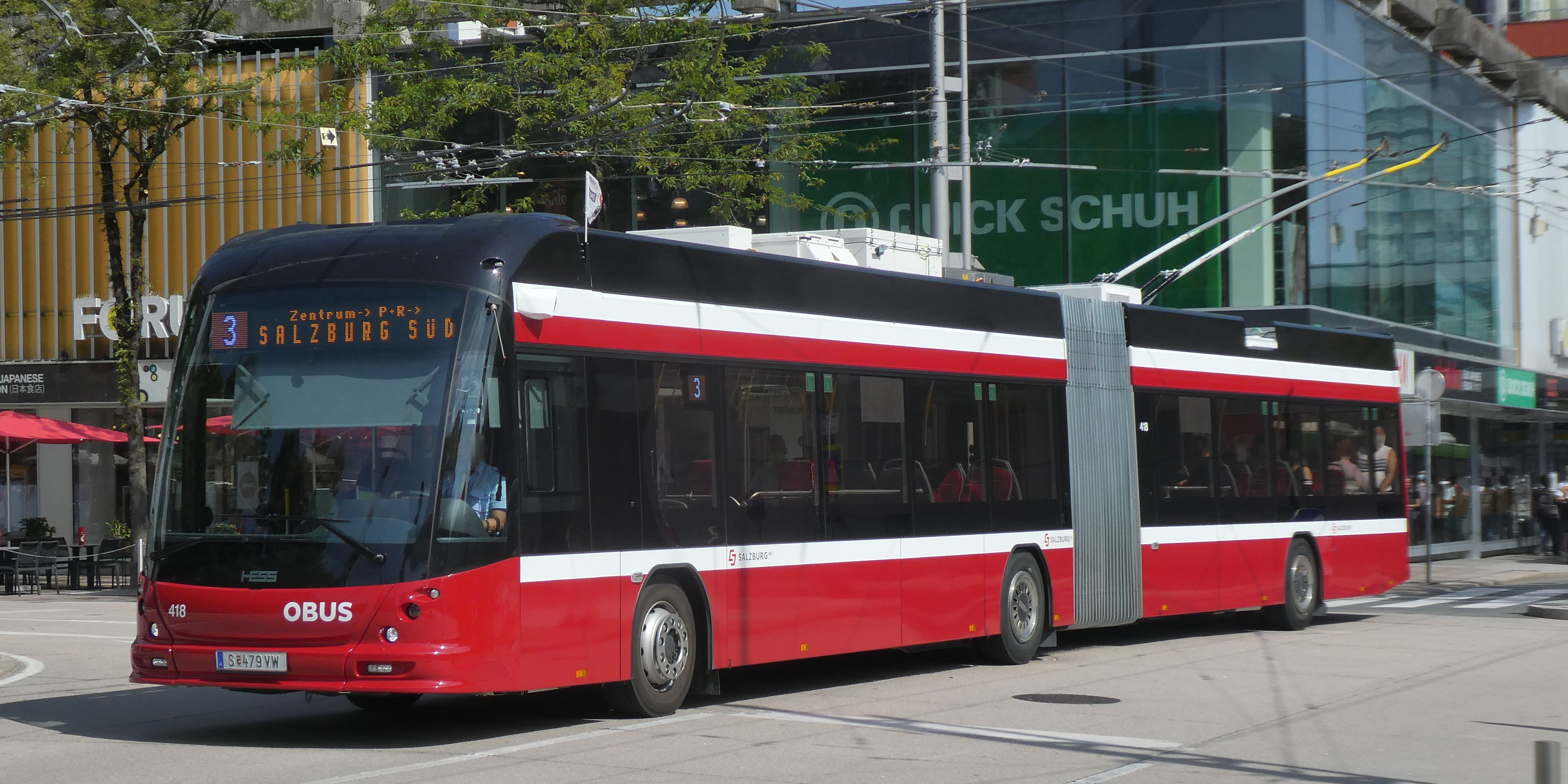
A Hess "SwissTrolley" trolleybus on route 3 in 2021

A Hess "SwissTrolley" trolleybus on route 10 in 2026

The oldest vehicles in the current fleet are the Van Hool AG300T trolleybuses, built in 2000–2003. Of the 32 Van Hool vehicles, 13 were equipped with a diesel-powered auxiliary drive, the first such devices to be fitted to vehicles in the Salzburg fleet. On 24 November 2008, two more Van Hool articulated vehicles arrived in Salzburg as secondhand acquisitions from the Montreux–Vevey trolleybus system, in Switzerland. These had been Montreux–Vevey fleet nos. 2 and 15, built in 1993/94, and were renumbered 259–260 in Salzburg. Following renovation work, including repainting into the dark-red-and-white livery used on the trains of the Salzburger Lokalbahn, they were placed in service in March 2009.

Of the next generation of trolleybuses, 15 Solaris Trollino 18s, the first three were delivered on 14 September 2009. Eight more followed in 2010, and the remaining four in 2011. The Solaris vehicles were painted dark red and have an auxiliary drive, to allow movement away from the overhead wires. In February 2010, one Solaris vehicle, fleet no. 301, was loaned to the Eberswalde trolleybus system in Germany for presentation purposes. (Four more trolleybuses of the same type were acquired secondhand from Solaris in 2013, after the La Chaux-de-Fonds system closed and returned the vehicles to the manufacturer; the last of these were retired in 2024.)

In 2012, Salzburger Lokalbahn (SLB) became the operator of the trolleybus system, and its livery of red-and-white (previously applied only to the two ex-Montreux–Vevey vehicles) was given to the Solaris Trollino vehicles, along with branding "Obus SLB" on the front ends—Obus being the German word for trolleybus.

Additional Solaris Trollino 18 vehicles were ordered subsequently, and beginning with number 321, they received Solaris's then-new "MetroStyle" body, with a more sloped front design similar to the design of Solaris's Tramino trams. They also introduced a new version of the system's livery, with red and black (with a white waist stripe) instead of red and cream or white. The first, no. 321, was delivered in May 2012, and the total number of Solaris Trollino MetroStyle trolleybuses ultimately reached 51, with the last arriving in 2018.

At the beginning of 2020, the total size of the active fleet was 120, not counting preserved vehicles.

An order was placed in November 2021 with Hess, of Switzerland, for 15 BGT-N1D trolleybuses, later reported to be the "lighTram 19DC" model rather than BGT-N1D. The first unit (no. 402) was delivered in August 2019 and entered service in September, and the last had been received by February 2020, by which time seven more had been ordered. Additional orders placed subsequently increased the total number of Hess trolleybuses in the fleet to 42 by 2023, the last deliveries being of nos. 439–442 in October 2023.

=== Table of the current fleet ===
Numbers	Quantity	Manufacturer	Electrical equipment	Year built	Model	Low-floor	Auxiliary drive	Notes
261–290	30	Van Hool	Kiepe	2000–2005	AG300T	yes	yes (261, 279–290) no (262–278)	
301–315 (Trollino); 321-371 (Trollino Metrostyle)	66	Solaris	Cegelec	2009–2018	Trollino 18	yes	yes	The Metrostyle is a trolleybus with a design inspired by the Solaris trams.
401–450	50	Hess	ABB	2019–2025	lighTram 19DC	yes	yes	

=== Heritage fleet ===
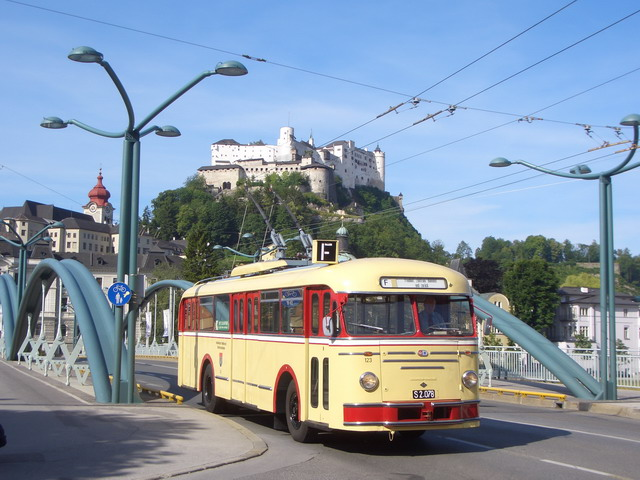
The ÜHIIIs heritage vehicle no. 123

The oldest operable trolleybus in Salzburg is a 1957 model ÜHIIIs. Although this type of trolleybus operated in Salzburg (from 1956 to 1976), this is not an original Salzburg vehicle. With the fictitious number 123, it comes from the Solingen trolleybus system (former number 40) and has been loaned by an English collector.

Since July 2007, the ÜHIIIs has been operating special trips in Salzburg, for which it wears a Salzburg livery. The vehicle can also be hired privately. From late July to late August each year, to coincide with the Salzburg Festival, the ÜHIIIs ran on a regular basis every Friday, on a special heritage line of the Association Pro Obus Salzburg eV. This service has continued in most subsequent summers, including in 2018 and 2019, on one Friday in each of June and July (also one day in May in 2018) and all Fridays in August.

Two other serviceable heritage vehicles, also in the care of Pro Obus Salzburg eV, are the 1985-built Gräf & Stift articulated trolleybus no. 178, and the 1988-built Steyr conventional (two-axle) trolleybus no. 109.

== See also ==
- List of trolleybus systems
- Transport in Austria
