= Schloss Aigen =

Castle in Aigen, Salzburgerland, Austria

- Aigen, Salzburg, Austria
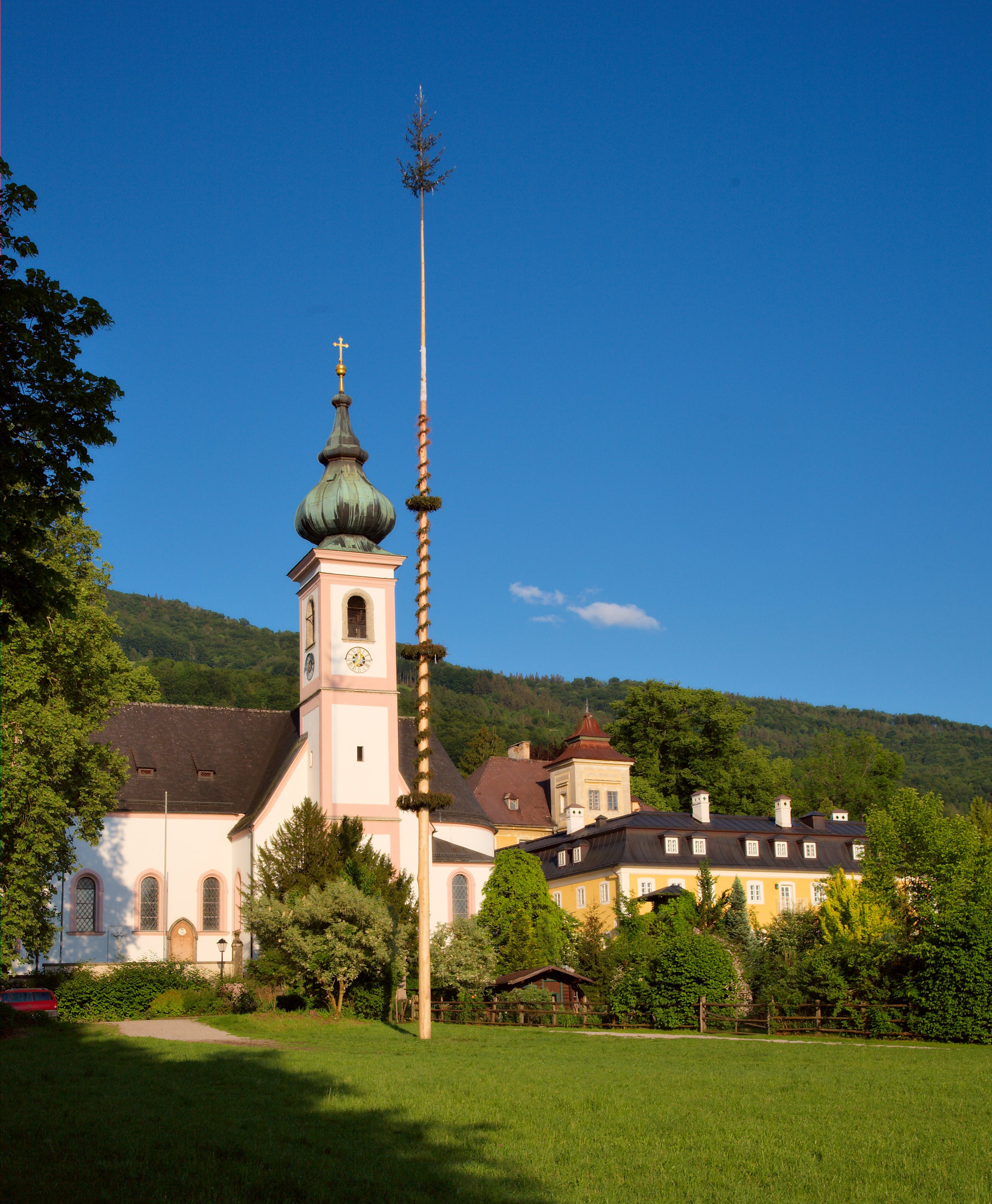
- Schloss Aigen and the church

Site information
- Type: Castle
- Owner: Counts von Revertera
- Operator: Counts von Revertera
- Controlled by: Counts von Revertera
- Open to the public: no

Location
- Coordinates: 47°47′10″N 13°05′17″E

Site history
- Built: 1402 (624 years ago)

Schloss Aigen is a castle located in Aigen, a quarter of Salzburg, Salzburgerland, Austria. The structure also includes a church, a restaurant, and a park.

== History ==
The castle was built in 1402 (624 years ago). The park was an English style park made in 1780.

During the Hungarian Revolution, in 1956, some of the refugees were processed through Salzburg. Schloß Aigen was rented by the U.S. Consulate in Salzburg and became apartments for the State Department staff.

== See also ==
- List of Castles in Austria
