= Sigmundstor =

18th century road tunnel in Salzburg, Austria

Coordinates: 47.798429°N 13.039178°E

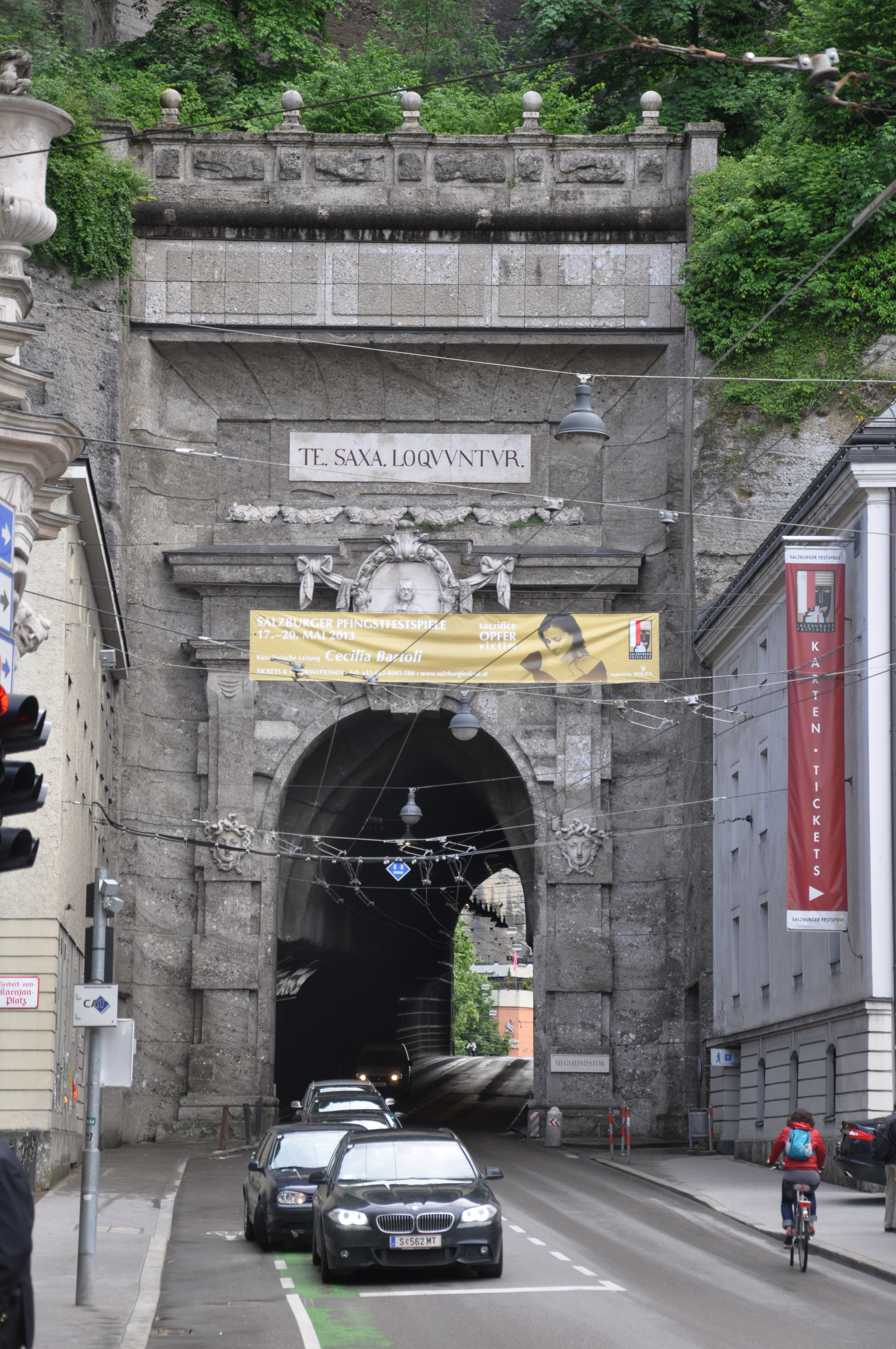
- Eastern entrance and view through the Sigmundstor, facing west
- Interactive map of Sigmundstor

Operation
- Work began: 1764

Technical
- Length: 131 metres (430 ft)

The Sigmundstor, often still known as the Neutor, is a road tunnel in Salzburg that also forms one of the city gates of the historic Altstadt. It connects the Altstadt with the Riedenburg quarter through the Mönchsberg mountain. Built in the 18th century, it is the oldest road tunnel in Austria.

The tunnel is 131 metres (430 ft) long, 5.5 metres (18 ft) wide and 8–10 metres (26–33 ft) high. It is dug at an 8% incline, which helps drainage and lets natural light illuminate it. Today, and despite its narrow lanes, the Sigmundstor is an important and busy transport route, carrying both car traffic and routes 1, 8 and 10 of the Salzburg trolleybus system. To the north of the main tunnel is a newer parallel tunnel for pedestrians and cyclists.

Initially, the tunnel was called Neutor and the square by the tunnel's eastern end was called Sigmundsplatz. Later, the square was re-named Herbert-von-Karajan-Platz in honour of Herbert von Karajan, the long-serving creative director of the Salzburg Festival. The Sigmund name was moved to the tunnel, however, most locals still refer to the Sigmundstor as the Neutor.

== History ==
=== Earlier projects ===
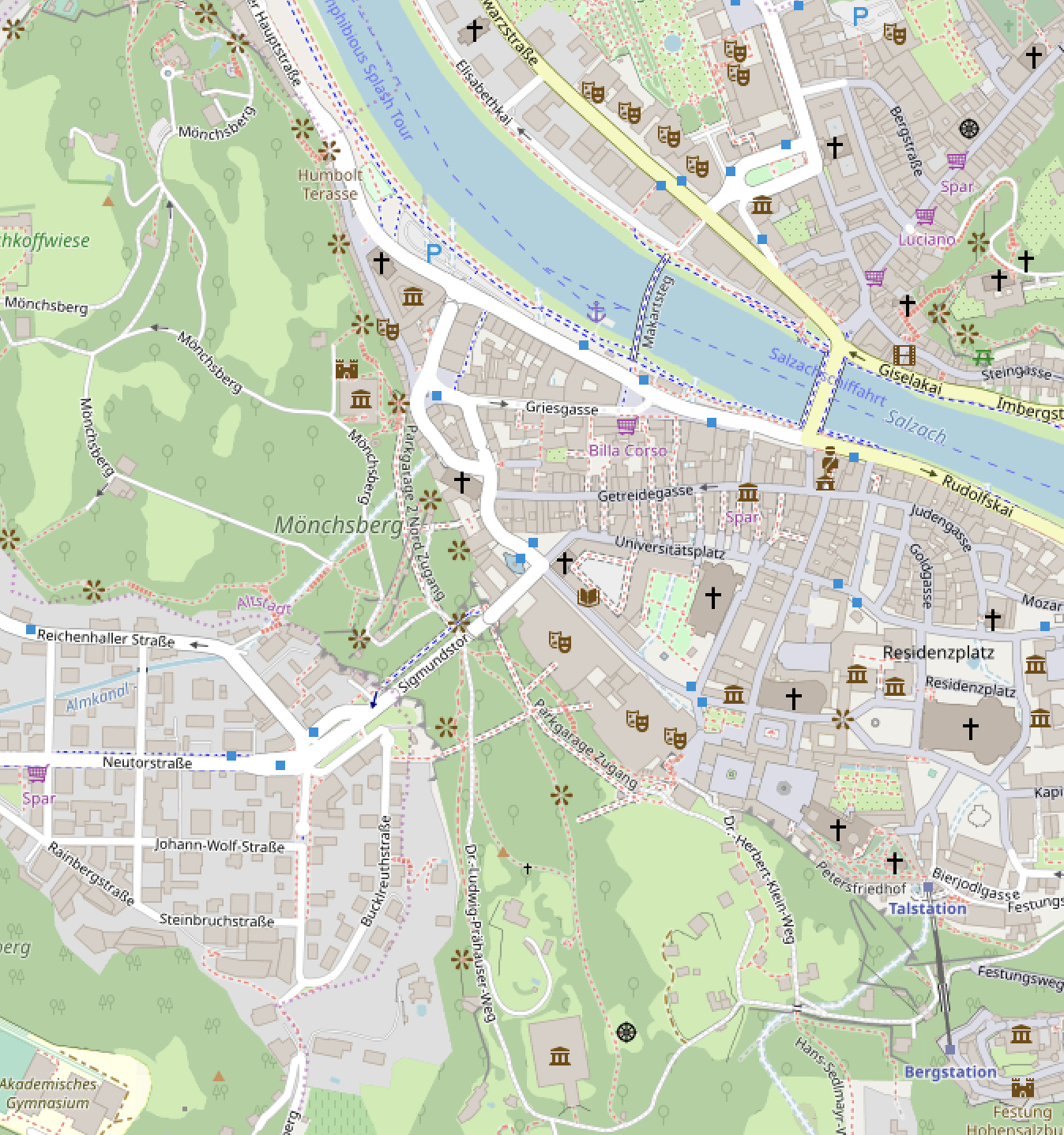
Street map of Salzburg showing the Sigmundstor cutting through the Mönchsberg

In 1675 the court commissioner of buildings Michael Springrueber approached Hofkriegsrat Guidobald Franz Freiherr von Hegi with a proposal to improve the fortifications protecting the central areas of Salzburg city, cutting the Mönchsberg ridge in two, and connecting the parts with a drawbridge. This would prevent any enemy that had succeeded in taking the Monika and Augustiner forts from making its way along the Mönchsberg right up to the outer works of the castle and from bombarding the old town from the heights.

In 1676 Hegi made the same proposal to the Prince-Archbishop of Salzburg, Max Gandolph von Küenburg and set out to see whether the Mönchsberg could indeed be cut at its narrowest point. In this proposal he mentioned for the first time the utility of the project for allowing the expansion of the city. The valley lowlands of Riedenburg could be made accessible by means of the cut and could allow room for settlers from the old town; the new district would also be militarily easy to secure.

From 1676 until Max Galdolph's death in 1687 excavations proceeded and a 35m wide cut was made in the mountain from its eastern side before work was abandoned as uneconomical. Traces of this work can still be seen today near the concert hall and in the lookout terrace cut into the rock above the Sigmundstor.

=== Tunnel construction ===
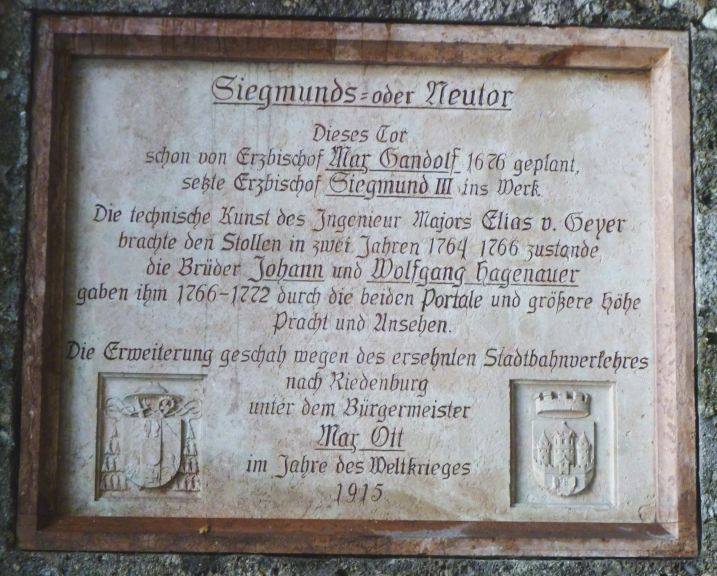
Memorial plaque in the Sigmundstor

In 1759, during the rule of Prince-Archbishop Sigismund von Schrattenbach, the plan to make a cutting through the Mönchsberg was reconsidered. After concerns about its feasibility, it was decided instead to build a tunnel using the existing cutting as its eastern terminus. Tunnel construction was under direction of the commissioner of buildings Elias Edler von Geyer, whilst the architect Wolfgang Hagenauer was responsible for the design of the portals at each end of the tunnel, and his brother Johann Baptist Hagenauer for the sculptures on the portals.

Digging started on both sides of the mountain in 1764 and 18 months later the tunnel was broken through. The tunnel portals took significantly longer, and were finally completed in 1768. According to the Court Chamber's calculations, the cost of the artistic design of the two gates totalled 18,000 gulden. The tunnel itself had only cost a third of that amount because the excavated material could be resold for road construction.

=== Subsequent history ===
In 1916 a tramline was constructed through the tunnel. In 1940 this was replaced by a route of the Salzburg trolleybus system. The tunnel underwent major restoration works in 1985/6 and in 1968/9 a parallel tunnel, for use by pedestrians and cyclists, was built to the north of the original tunnel.

Over the years, the tunnel became one of the most important transport links in the city of Salzburg, avoiding long detours via alternative routes. The intensity of the traffic provided a challenge for the preservation of the structure and decorations of the centuries-old tunnel. In 2009, crumbling pieces of stone on the Riedenburg portal made it clear that there was an urgent need for action, and scaffolding and safety nets were attached to the portals in autumn of that year. Restoration work followed, involving cleaning of the portals and removal of harmful salts, roots, moss and algae from the stone structures. Where necessary, corroded iron fixing were replaced by stainless steel equivalents, over-hard mortar from previous renovations replaced, and defects closed using natural stone and supplementary mortar that matched the original materials.

Before city council and mayoral elections in 2019, the SPÖ, NEOS and Grüne parties proposed to ban private cars from the Sigmundstor. However after losing the first round of voting the SPÖ distanced itself from this proposal, and the tunnel remains open to all traffic.

== Features ==
=== The eastern entrance ===
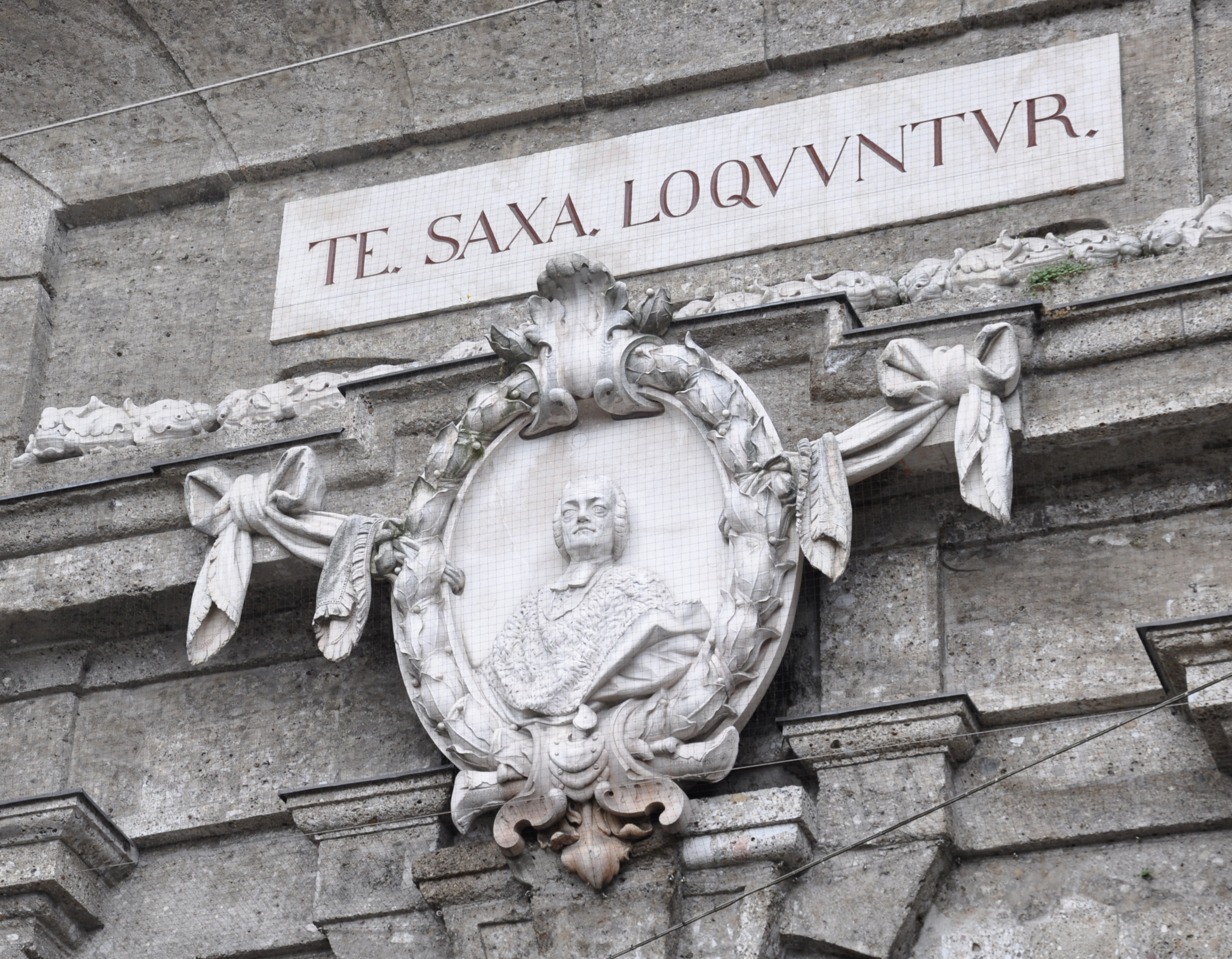
Relief at the eastern entrance

At the tunnel entrance on the old town side an inscription was carved over a bas-relief of the Prince-Archbishop with the words Te saxa loquuntur ('The stones speak of you'). Originally the structure of the baroque horsepond with its frescoes extended in front of the current eastern gate, giving the square a symmetrical form. A decorative gate within that structure led under cover to the present gate at the head of the tunnel. This structure was demolished around 1860.

=== The western entrance ===
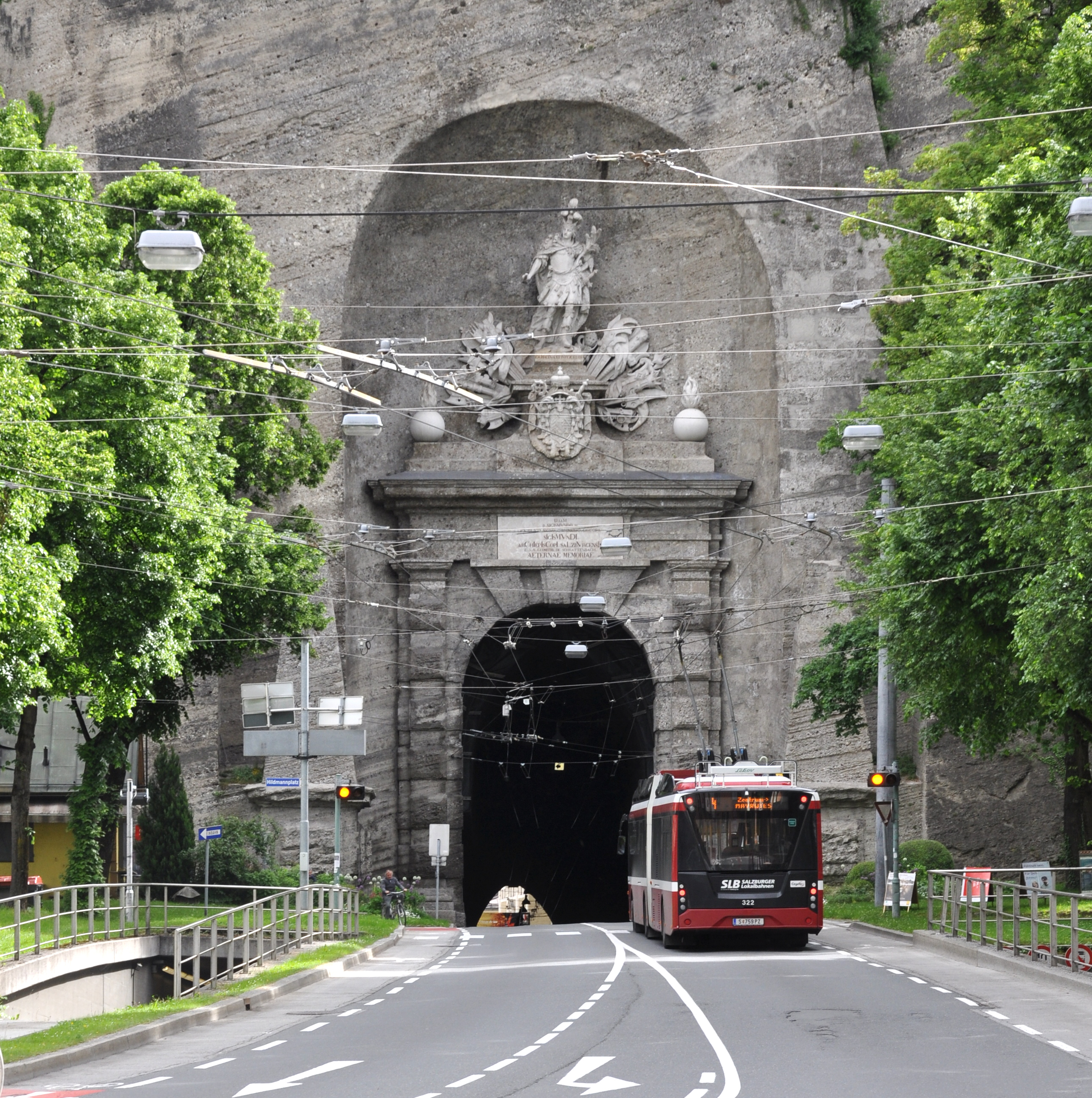
Western entrance of the Sigmundstor

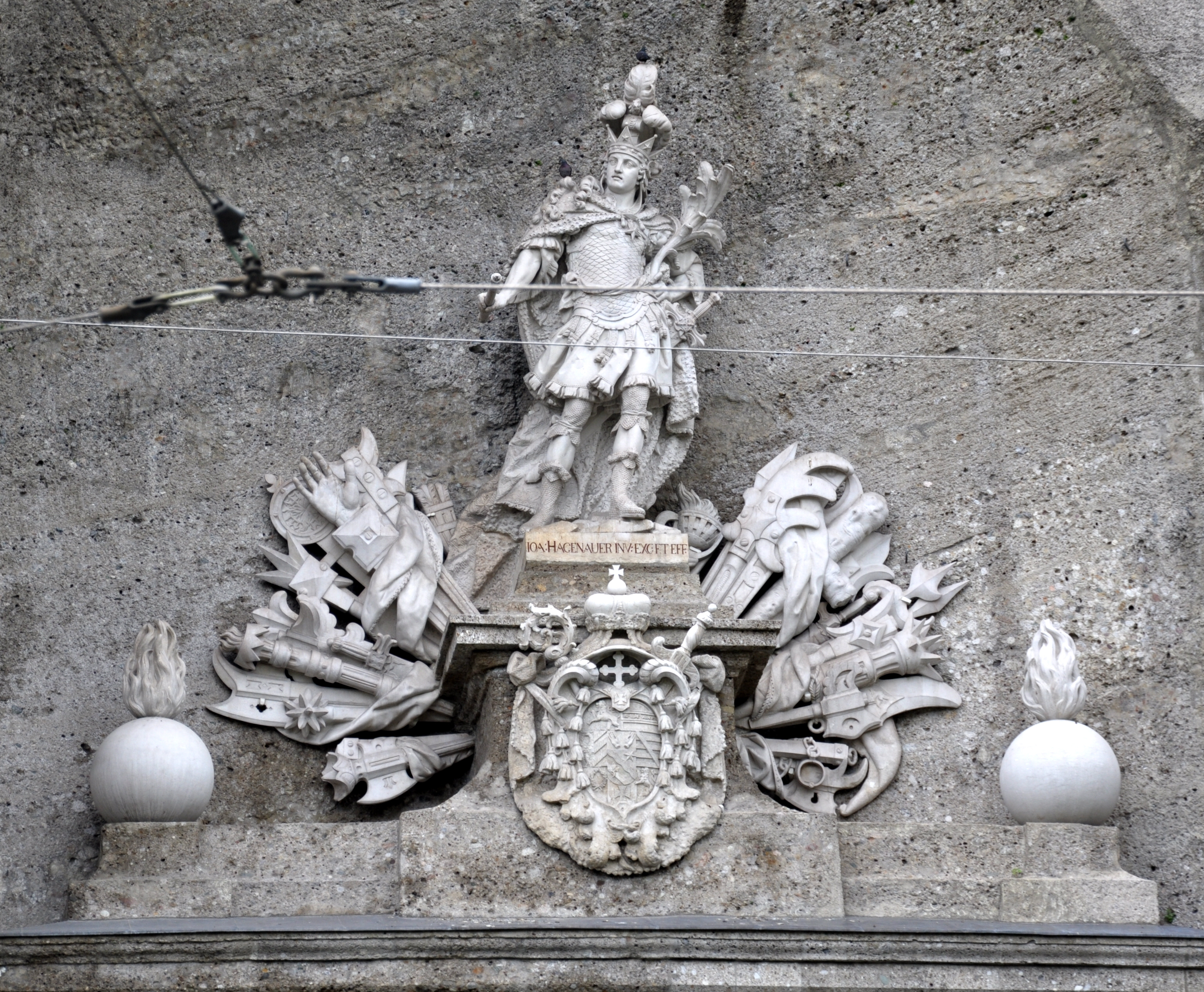
St. Sigismund over the western entrance

The western entrance on the Riedenburg side has a statue of the martyr Sigismund of Burgundy (†524) above war trophies and the Schrattenbach crest. The inscription there reads: 'D(eo) O(ptimo) M(aximo) - D(ivino) Sigismundo M(artyri) publico bono, commodo decori. SIgIsMVnDI ArChIepIsCopI SaLzVrgensIs P(rincepis) S(acri) R(omani imperii) comitib(us) de Schrattenbach aeternae memoriae W(olfgangus) Hagenauer archit(ectus)'. The capital letters in the inscription, added together, come to 1767. The plinth of the statue carries the inscription Joan(nnae) Hagenauer inv(enit) exc(ussit) et eff(ecit) ('Johann (Baptist) Hagenauer discovered, hewed it out and completed (this statue)').

The original plan included the construction of a military outer structure on the Riedenburg side, disguised as a park of 'ruins', then fashionable. However nothing more than a pair of obelisks, to the right and left of the portal, was ever completed.

=== The former Zwinger in front of the west gate ===
Until around 1860 the Sigmundstor was defended on its western side by a fortified defensive Zwinger, including a defensive wall, guardhouse and tollbooth, surrounded in three sides by a moat with drawbridges. The tunnel itself could be defended with a palisade in the event of attack.

== Bibliography ==
- Adolf Hahnl: Das Neutor (Schriftenreihe des Stadtvereins Salzburg. Kulturgut der Heimat. Book 6, ZDB-ID 842494-9). Stadtvereins Salzburg, Salzburg 1977.
- Clemens M. Hutter: Das Neutor ist mehr als ein „Loch im Berg“. Bastei – Magazin des Salzburger Stadtvereins, 2018, vol. 67 pages 34–35.
- Reinhard Medicus: Die alten Wehrbauten der Stadtberge. In: Christian F. Uhlir (ed.): Salzburger Stadtberge. Mönchsberg, Kapuzinerberg, Festungsberg, Nonnberg und Rainberg. edition winterwork, Borsdorf 2011, ISBN 978-3-86468-033-5, pages 138–157
