= Messezentrum Salzburg =

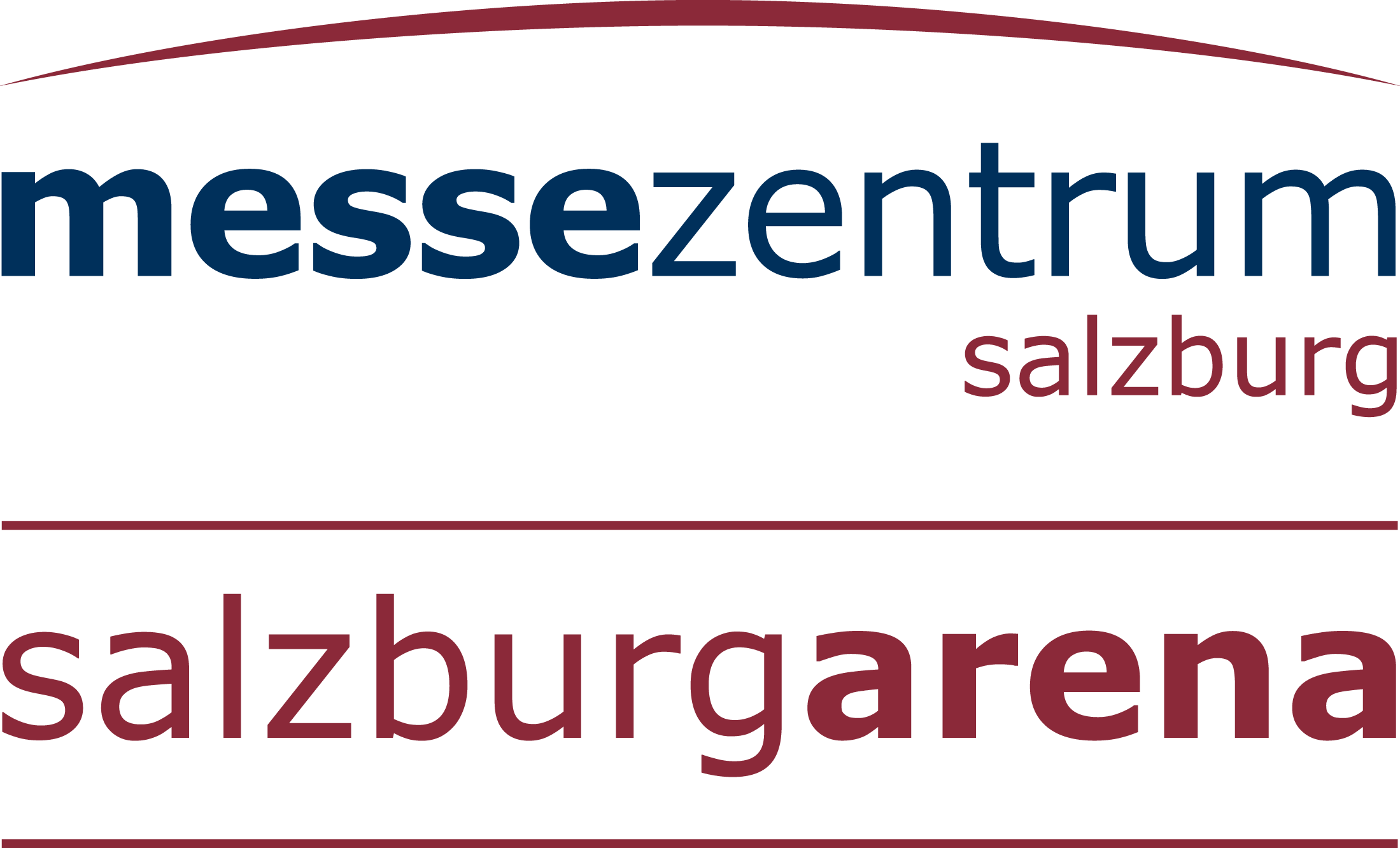

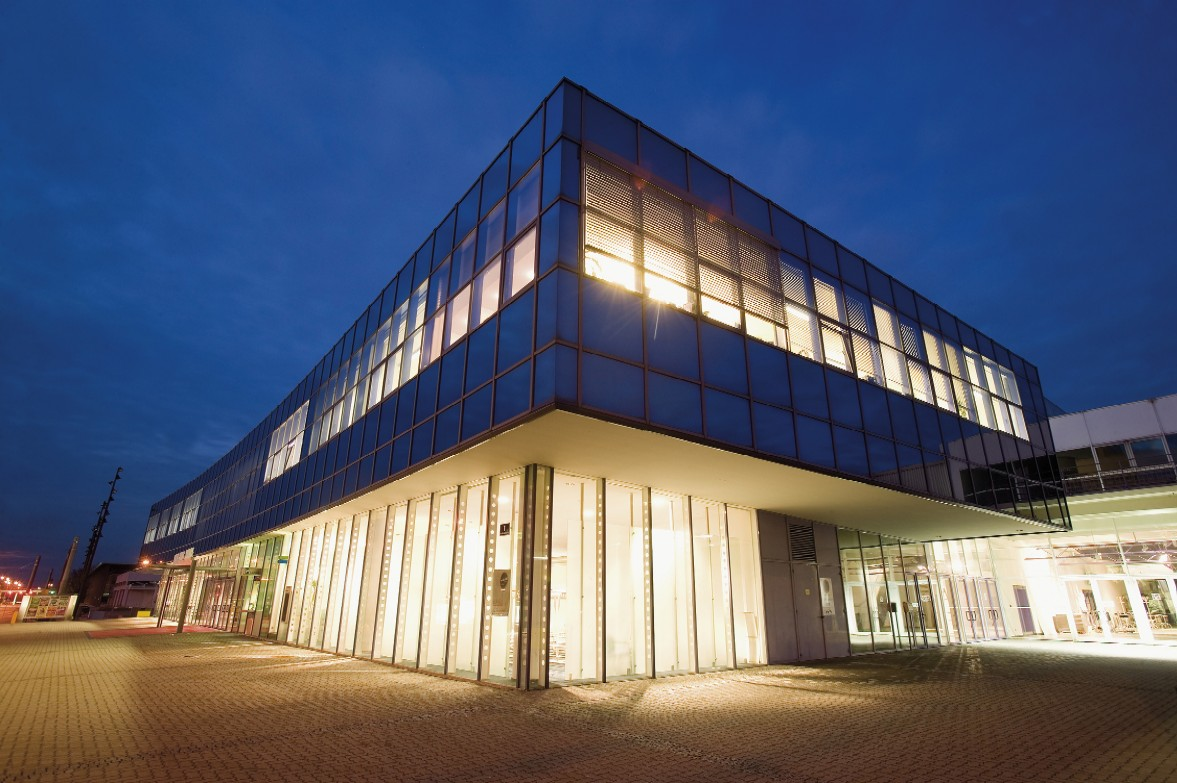
- Interactive map of Messezentrum Salzburg
- Location: Liefering, Salzburg, Austria
- Coordinates: 47.8241°N 13.0275°E
- Operator: Messezentrum Salzburg GmbH

Construction
- Opened: 1973; 53 years ago
- Renovated: 2011–12
- Expanded: 1971, 1976, 1984, 2003, 2006

Website
- www.messezentrum-salzburg.at

Messezentrum Salzburg is an exhibition center in the Austrian state capital of Salzburg, in the district of Liefering. Connected to the Messezentrum Salzburg is the Salzburgarena, a multi-functional event hall which is part of the center.

With about 37 trade fairs and exhibitions, the Messezentrum Salzburg attracts up to 591,599 visitors each year.

== History ==
Today's Messezentrum Salzburg GmbH was founded as "Salzburger Ausstellungs Zentrum Ges.m.b.H." in 1973 by the City of Salzburg, the province of Salzburg and the Chamber of Commerce. In 1969 a new, permanent location for the Dult, a public festival of Salzburg, was needed. The municipal council chose a site in the district of Liefering.

In 1974 the first three halls were used for a trade fair (AutoZum). The fourth hall was completed in 1974, with two more halls opened in 1976. Today, there are 15 multi-functional halls.

== Data ==
Total size of exhibition halls: 34,828 m^{2} (without Salzburgarena)

- Exhibition halls: 15 multi-functional halls laid out in a concentric pattern
- Size of exhibition halls: 1,650 m^{2} up to 6,000 m^{2}
- Number of visitors per year: around 591,599
- Digital information system for visitors, WLAN
- Outdoor area: 22,000 m^{2}
- 3,400 parking spaces

== Trade fairs ==
The majority of the trade fairs are organized by Reed Exhibitions, which is an internationally operating corporation group, some are organized by the Messezentrum Salzburg GmbH (formerly Salzburger Ausstellungs Zentrum Ges.m.b.H.) and by guest organizers. Since the halls of the Messezentrum are connected with the Salzburgarena through an indoor-access, it is possible to combine the two locations for an event.

- Auto Messe Salzburg – International trade fair for cars, motorcycles and tuning
- Berufs-Info-Messe
- Classic Expo – International trade fair for classic cars
- Musik Salzburg
- Monumento – Trade fair for monument preservation
- Quo Vadis
- Salzburger Dult – Public festival of Salzburg
- Salzburger Spielemesse

== Salzburgarena ==
The Salzburgarena is a multi-functional hall directly connected to the Messezentrum Salzburg. It was opened in 2003 and is used for major events. The oval wooden dome of the Salzburgarena is the largest in Western Austria and there is space for up to 6,700 people.

== Access ==
The Messezentrum Salzburg has its own exit on the motorway A1, or it can be reached via the Münchner Bundesstraße. From the city centre the city bus no 1 stops in front of the Messezentrum (free ride when there is an event). There are 3,400 car parking spaces which are used as Park & Ride car parks during July and August. The Salzburg Airport and the main station are close (ca. 3 km).
