= Salzburgarena =

Multi-functional Hall in Liefering, Austria

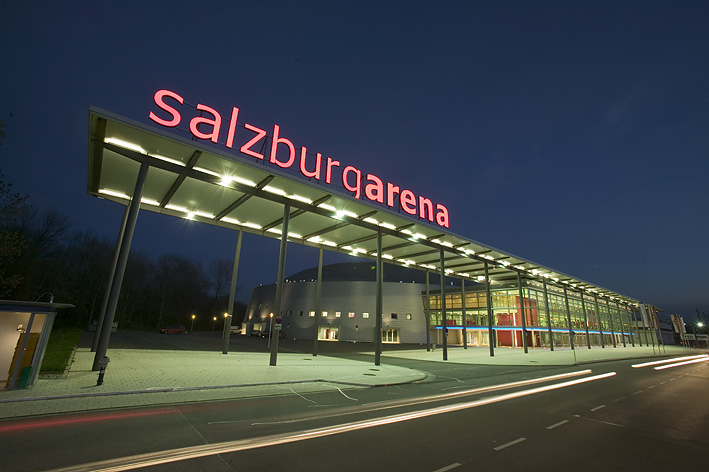
- Interactive map of Salzburgarena
- Location: Salzburg, Austria
- Coordinates: 47.8253°N 13.0279°E
- Owner: Messezentrum Salzburg Ges.m.b.H.
- Capacity: 6,700

Construction
- Built: October 2003
- Opened: 7 December 2003
- Architects: KSP Engel & Zimmermann
- General contractors: Emberger & Heuberger

Salzburgarena is a multi-functional hall situated in Liefering, a district of Salzburg, Austria. It is a venue for concerts, sporting events and due to flexible seating arrangements, there is space for up to 6,700 people. The venue was opened with a concert by the Vienna Philharmonic, conducted by Nikolaus Harnoncourt, on 7 December 2003.

The Salzburgarena has the largest wooden dome of Western Austria and it is directly connected to the Messezentrum Salzburg via an indoor access. Therefore, it is possible to combine these two locations for an event. Every year about 65 events which take place at the Salzburgarena attract more than 100,000 visitors.

== Technical data ==
- Variable capacity up to 6,700 seats
- Total length of the Salzburgarena 118.16 m
- Overall width excl. extension 89.38 m
- Overall width incl. extension 103.34 m
- Gross floor area 21,068.05 m^{2}
- Gross capacity 179,399.11 m^{3}

The Salzburgarena is a Blackbox (without daylight) and free of pillars.

== Traffic ==
The Salzburgarena can be reached with bus No. 1 from the main station and from the city centre. The bus goes every 10 minutes and stops directly in front of the main station.

== See also ==
- Messezentrum Salzburg
- List of indoor arenas in Austria
