= Aigen (Salzburg city district) =

District of Salzburg, Salzburg, Austria

Coordinates: 47.7869°N 13.0806°E

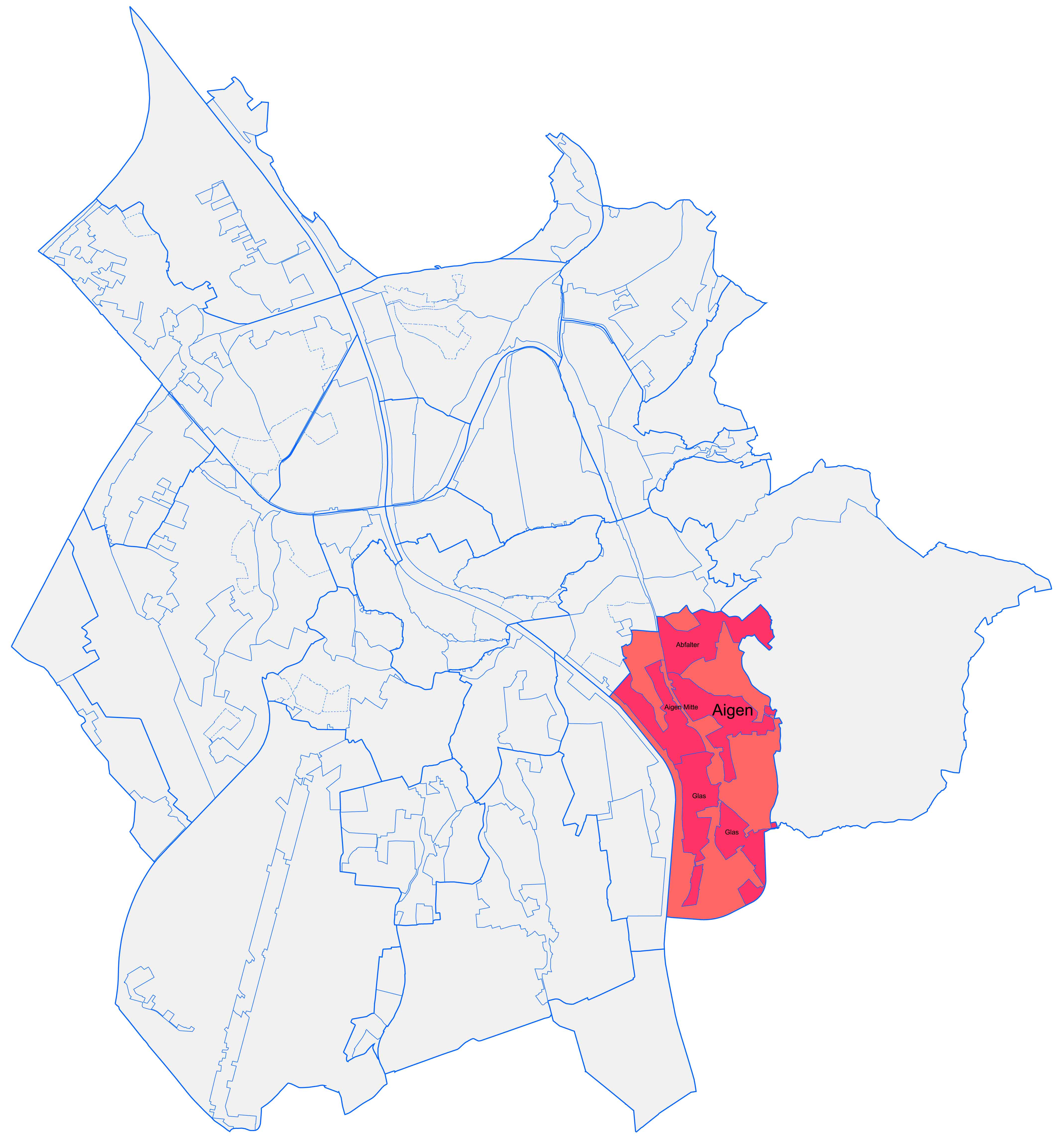
Salzburg Districts. Aigen is in the south-east of the map

Aigen is a district in the city of Salzburg, Salzburgerland, Austria and is known as one of the most expensive residential areas of the provincial capital. It is one of the 24 districts in which Salzburg is organized. The Salzach river is its western border and the municipality of Elsbethen is to the south. Many celebrities such as the Families Porsche and Piech, Franz Beckenbauer, Renate Thyssen-Henne, DJ Ötzi and others live in Aigen.

== About the Name ==
The word aigen, Old High German eigan, means to own and as a noun refers to the (inherited) property or the freedom to own property. Eigentuom is a Middle High German word and stands for the free right of possession. An Aigner is therefore a free, non-assessable farmer.

== Infrastructures ==
The Salzburg-Aigen railway station (part of ÖBB lines), and the Youth Hostel Association are located here.

There is also the Authority for the Finance (Finanzamt).

== Historic items ==
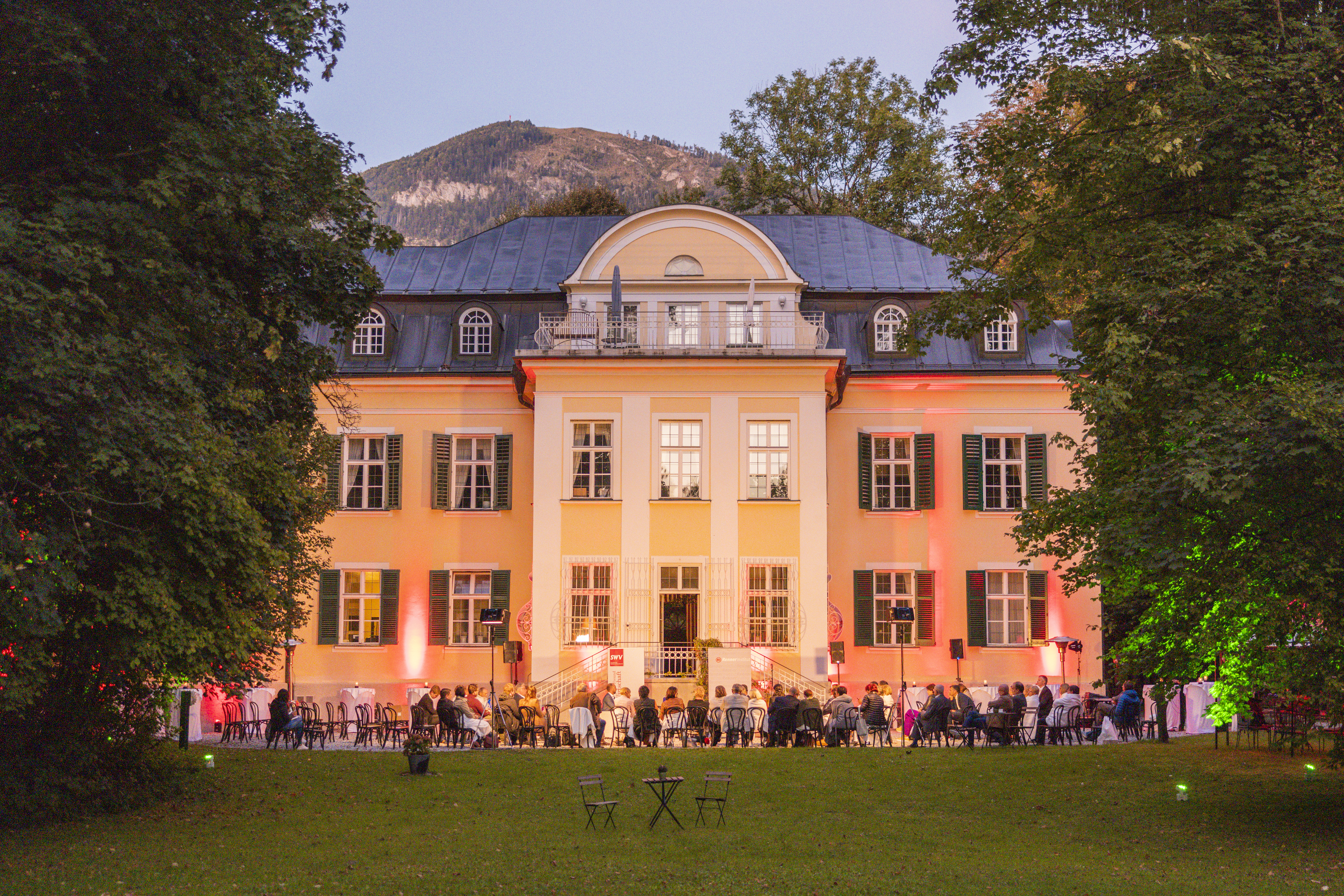
Villa Trapp in 2021

Its famous Schloss Aigen (Aigen's Castle) was built in 1402. The Trapp family, on whom The Sound of Music was based, lived in a villa near the castle. The Trapp villa was seized by the Nazi Party in 1939 after they fled the country, and it was one of Heinrich Himmler's personal residences during World War II.

The Aigner Park was made, in the English style, in 1780 for the Schloss Aigen.

== Divisions ==
Aigen has three main parts: Glas, Aigen Mitte and Abfalter:

=== Glas ===
==== Villas in Glas ====
- Villa Stolz, built in 1845.
- Villa Phillips, built in 1853.

=== Aigen Mitte ===
==== Villas in Aigen Mitte ====
- Villa Lanser-Gyllenstorm, built in 1862/63.
- Villa Kummer (later Villa Schönburg-Hardtenstein), built in 1922.
- Villa Coudenhove I (later Villa Salm), built in 1856.
- Villa Coudenhove II (later Villa Reedl), built in 1861.
- Villa Walburga (from the architect Architekt Valentin Ceconi), later Villa Lamberg (from V. Ceconi), then Villa Trapp, built in 1863.
- Villa Fackler (later Villa Fux too), built in 1901.
- Waldvilla Fürst Schwarzenberg, built in 1886.

=== Abfalter ===
==== Villas in Abfalter ====
- Abfalterhof
- Villa Jany (Villa Ornig), built in 1884.
- Villa Rudholzer (Villa Attems), built in 1904.
- Villa Joachim (Villa Künßberg), built in 1860.
- Villa Bellegarde (Villa Grein, Villa Preuschen), built in 1860.
- Grünbichlhof (Villa Kahlenbeck) built in 1855.
- Villa Hahn (Villa Thurn und Taxis), built in 1854.

== Population ==
Aigen has around 10,000 inhabitants.

== See also ==
- Salzburg
- Salzburgerland
