= December 1905 =

Month of 1905

<<	December 1905					>>
Su	Mo	Tu	We	Th	Fr	Sa
					1	2
3	4	5	6	7	8	9
10	11	12	13	14	15	16
17	18	19	20	21	22	23
24	25	26	27	28	29	30
31

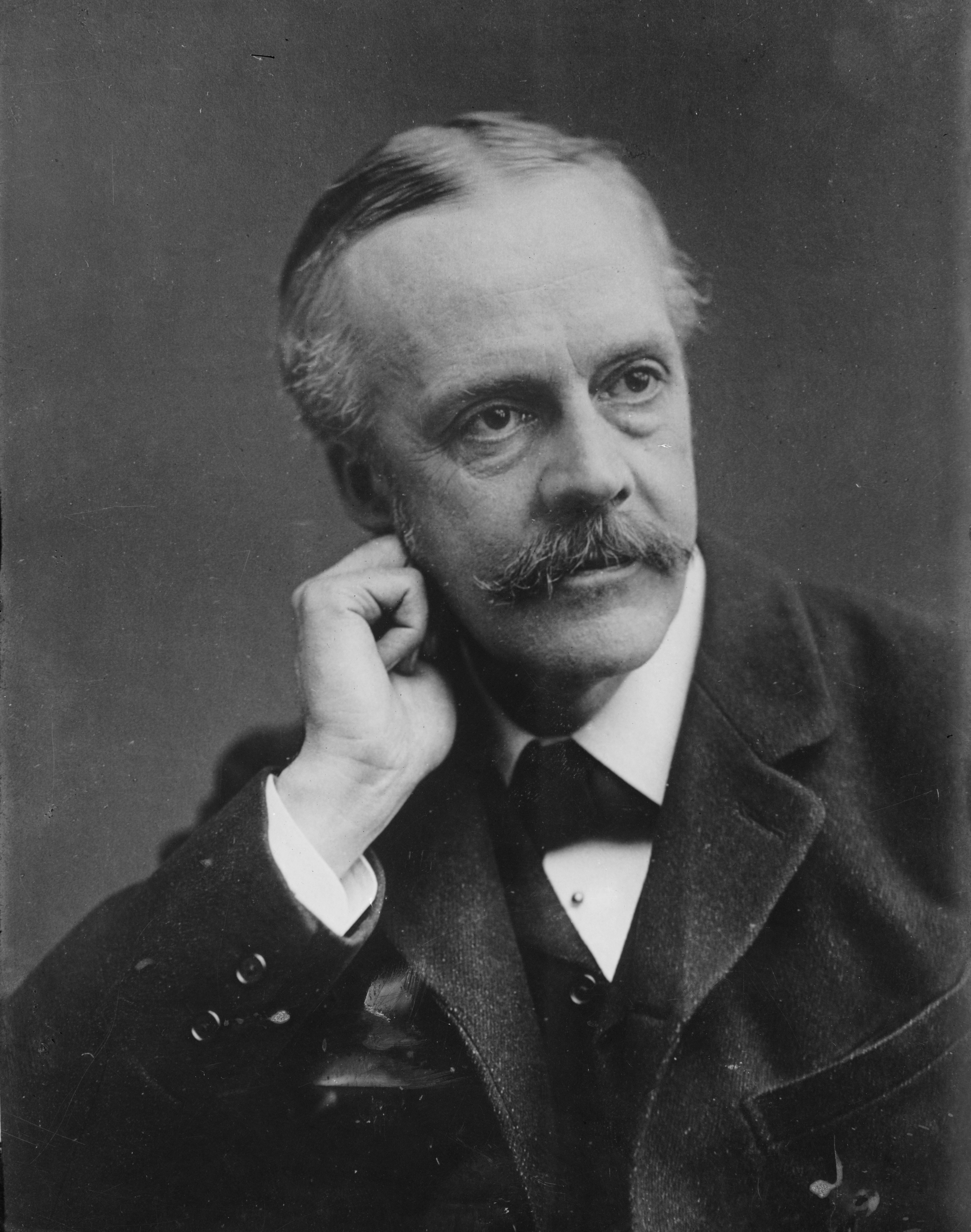
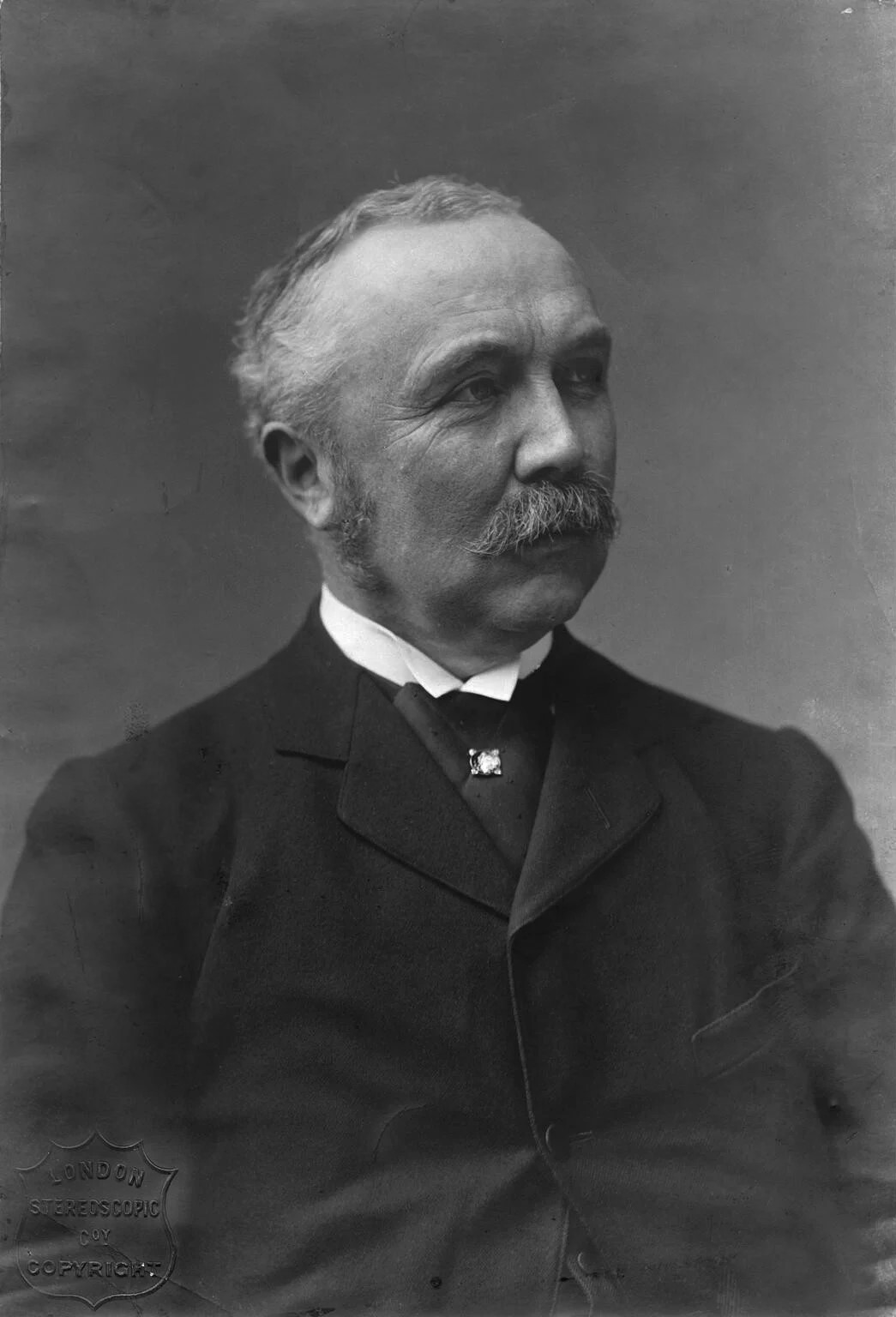
December 4, 1905: Unpopular British Prime Minister Balfour resigns, replaced by Campbell-Bannerman

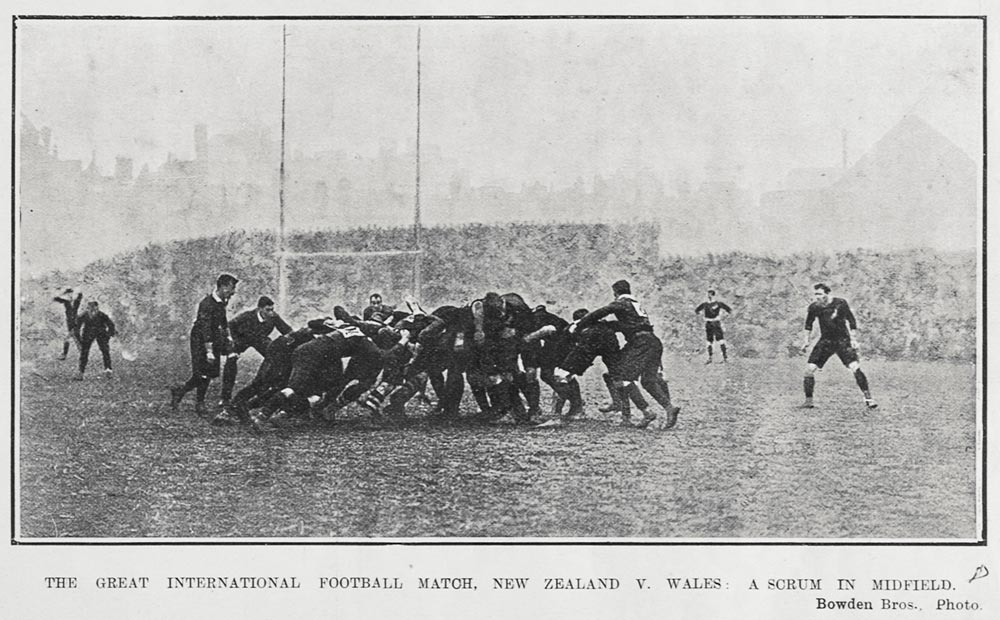
December 16, 1905: Wales defeats New Zealand, 3 to 0, in rugby union's "Match of the Century"

The following events occurred in December 1905:

== December 1, 1905 (Friday) ==
- Voting was held in the Republic of Cuba for the president and for the 12-member Cuban Senate and the 32-member House of Representatives. After the withdrawal by the Liberal Party of its candidates, President Tomás Estrada Palma was the only person on the ballot for that office, and all of the candidates of his Moderate Party were elected, with the exception of one independent. The election was fraudulent enough that the U.S. Department of War would institute its Platt Amendment powers nine months later to form an occupational government.
- Segismundo Moret formed a new government as Prime Minister of Spain, after the sudden resignation of Eugenio Montero Ríos.
- Rioting began in British Guiana, the only British colony on the continent of South America, after police in Georgetown fired shots into a crowd of protesters at a plantation. Before the riot was suppressed, seven people were killed and seven seriously injured.
- The Philippine Medical School, which would become the University of the Philippines in less than three years, was founded by the U.S.-sponsored Philippine Commission's Act No. 1415.
- In Korea, a protectorate of Japan, Son Byong-hi, leader of the Donghak religion, based on Confucianism, modernized the organization to make its operations more transparent and less likely to be prohibited by the Japanese. Son changed the name to Cheondoism.
- An explosion at the Diamond Coal and Coke Company near Diamondville, Wyoming killed 18 miners.
- Died: James Potter Davenport, 64, American politician and the first public official in the U.S. to be removed from office by a recall election, was killed in a streetcar accident several months after losing his job as a Los Angeles City councilman.

== December 2, 1905 (Saturday) ==
- Norsk Hydro-Elektrisk Kvælstofaktieselskab, predecessor of Equinor, a state-run energy product and grid brand in Scandinavia, was founded in Norway in order to bring electricity.
- Count Hayashi Tadasu presented his credentials at the Court of St James's to become Japan's first ambassador to the United Kingdom.
- The first match between the national rugby union teams of England and New Zealand took place before a crowd of 45,000 spectators at Crystal Palace Park in South London as part of New Zealand's 1905-1906 tour of Britain. New Zealand won, 15 to 0, with Duncan McGregor scoring four of the five three-point tries.
- An unknown person in north Philadelphia threw a heavy iron weight at the train taking U.S. President Theodore Roosevelt and his guests home to Washington D.C. after the Army-Navy Game played earlier in the day. The attacker apparently hurled the plumb bob in the belief that Roosevelt was riding in the presidential train car. Instead, the projectile showered glass on U.S. Army Major Webb Hayes who, "from a profile view, strongly resembled the President" and was riding in the "Salvius", a train car that "in appearance might have been mistaken very easily for President Roosevelt's private car." Roosevelt's car, however, was at the back of the train. Hayes, riding in the front car, sustained minor cuts from broken glass although the iron missile "narrowly had missed his head."

== December 3, 1905 (Sunday) ==
- "Tautiška giesmė", which would become the national anthem of Lithuania, was given its first public performance. Vincas Kudirka had written the music and lyrics shortly before his death in 1899. The song was performed by a choir led by Mikas Petrauskas, the day before the Great Seimas of Vilnius.
- The Saint Petersburg Soviet, a gathering of anti-government Bolshevik party members from across Russia, was suppressed with the mass arrest of delegates by the Okhrana, the Russian Empire's secret police. Among the delegates arrested were Leon Trotsky and Alexander Bogdanov.
- Born: General Francisco Javier Arana, Guatemalan military leader and chairman of the junta that ruled Guatemala in 1944 and 1945; in Villa Canales (assassinated 1949)
- Died: John Bartlett, 75, American reference publisher known for editing and updating Bartlett's Familiar Quotations since 1855.

== December 4, 1905 (Monday) ==
- Arthur Balfour, the unpopular Prime Minister of the United Kingdom, resigned along with his entire cabinet resigned in hopes that their Conservative Party could retain their majority in the scheduled January 12 parliamentary elections. Balfour would not only see the Conservative Party lose 246 of their 402 seats in the House of Commons, he would lose his own seat in Parliament as well.
- The 59th U.S. Congress opened its first session. The Republican Party, which had a 251 to 135 seat advantage over the Democrats in the House of Representatives, re-elected Joe Cannon as Speaker of the House.
- The wreck of the Canadian steamer Lunenberg killed 11 of the 17 people aboard, after running aground on the rocks at Cape Breton while trying to travel into Amherst Harbor. Five of the crew took advantage of a chance to be rescued by a fishing boat, while 12 others declined to abandon their ship because there appeared to be little damage. When the group did abandon ship, their lifeboat overturned and only the captain survived.

== December 5, 1905 (Tuesday) ==
- Sir Henry Campbell-Bannerman, leader of the Liberal Party, formed a new cabinet as Prime Minister of the United Kingdom, replacing Arthur Balfour.
- Six people were killed and eight injured when the roof of the Charing Cross railway station near London collapsed.
- Russia's government averted a nationwide railway strike by setting aside a death sentence that had been issued to a convicted strike leader.
- U.S. President Theodore Roosevelt's State of the Union address was read aloud by clerks in separately to the U.S. Senate and to the House of Representatives.
- The government of Turkey accepted the demands of Austria, Italy, France and Britain to institute reforms in Macedonia, after their fleet of warships had taken possession of Mitylene on November 28. The warships withdrew on December 15.
- Born:
  - Otto Preminger, Austrian-born American film director; in Wischnitz, Austria-Hungary (now Vyzhnytsia in Ukraine) (d. 1986)
  - Frank Pakenham, 7th Earl of Longford, Leader of the House of Lords from 1964 to 1968; in North Aston, Oxfordshire (d. 2001)
- Died: Henry Eckford, 82, Scottish horticulturalist who perfected the Grandflora sweet peas

== December 6, 1905 (Wednesday) ==
- Voting was held for 76 of the 80 seats in the New Zealand House of Representatives, excepting only the four seats reserved for the Māori people. The New Zealand Liberal Party (NZLP), led by Prime Minister Richard Seddon increased its 42 to 21 majority to 58 of 80 seats. Voting for the four Maori seats took place on December 20.
- Born: Clifford W. Dupont, President of Rhodesia from 1970 to 1975; in London (d. 1978)

== December 7, 1905 (Thursday) ==
- Dr. Eduard Zirm, an Austrian ophthalmologist, performed the world's first successful corneal transplant. Alois Glogar, a 45-year-old Czech farm worker received the corneas of an 11-year old boy at Dr. Zim's eye clinic hospital in Olmütz (now Olomouc in the Czech Republic).
- The original British Symphony Orchestra, formed by composer William Sewell, gave its first public performance, appearing at Aeolian Hall in London.
- A Bolshevik-led revolt began in Moscow and lasted for 11 days.
- Ten people were killed in a collision of railroad trains in Wyoming.
- Sailing off of the coast of the U.S. state of Florida, three respected ornithologists witnessed a large animal while watching from the British steam yacht Valhalla. Edmund Meade-Waldo, Michael John Nicoll and the Earl of Crawford saw what Meade-Waldo described as having a six-foot wide fin and a thick neck as wide as a man's body. The press quickly dubbed their sight a "sea serpent". A freighter, the Happy Warrior, reported a similar sighting on December 10.
- Born: Gerard Kuiper, Netherlands-born U.S. astronomer for whom the Kuiper belt is named; in Tuitjenhorn (d. 1973)

== December 8, 1905 (Friday) ==
- The Census and Statistics Act 1905, a law passed to establish a decennial census in Australia, received royal assent.
- The Rawalpindi Parade 1905 was held by the British Indian Army in Rawalpindi in India, to honor the visiting George, Prince of Wales (who would become King George V in 1910) and his wife, Princess Mary.
- Died:
  - John H. Mitchell, 70, U.S. Senator for Oregon since 1866, known for his conviction in the Oregon land fraud scandal earlier in the year, died of complications from a recent dental surgery. The U.S. Senate had been considering his expulsion at the time of his death.
  - Rabbi Zadoc Kahn, 66, Chief Rabbi of France since 1889
  - Olivia Floyd, 79, former spy and blockade runner for the Confederacy during the American Civil War.

== December 9, 1905 (Saturday) ==
- By a vote of 181 to 102, the Senate of France enacted the Law on the Separation of the Churches and the State was passed, abrogating the Concordat of 1801 that favored the Roman Catholic Church, and introducing its doctrine of laïcité or secularism.
- Representatives of Venezuela and Brazil signed protocols to settle their long-time boundary dispute.
- Georgy Khrustalev-Nosar, the first chairman of the Russian Bolsheviks' Saint Petersburg Soviet, was arrested. 1 The date is sometimes listed as November 26, in that Russia still used the "old style" Julian calendar, 13 days behind the Gregorian calendar used in most of the rest of the world. Leon Trotsky was subsequently chosen for the Bolshevik chapter in the Russian capital, and Khrustalev-Nosar never returned to the leadership.
- At the request of Walter Camp, representatives from nine colleges met at a conference at the Manhattan Hotel in New York to discuss changes in the rules of football to make the sport safer. The day before, faculty from 13 of 19 colleges invited attended a meeting at the Murray Hill Hotel to give their comments for the Rules Committee to consider.
- Died:
  - Henry Holmes, 65, British violinist and symphonic composer
  - Sir Richard Claverhouse Jebb, 64, British classical scholar known for his translations of ancient Greek literature

== December 10, 1905 (Sunday) ==
- "The Gift of the Magi", the classic surprise ending Christmas story by American author O. Henry, was published for the first time, printed in the magazine section of The New York Sunday World.
- The Nobel Prizes were presented to the laureates by the King Oscar II of Sweden, with German scientists sweeping the prizes for chemistry (Adolf von Baeyer of Germany being awarded the prize for chemistry for the synthesis of indigo); physics (Philipp Lenard for his discovery of the properties of cathode rays); and medicine (Robert Koch for his findings of the bacteriological causes of tuberculosis, cholera and anthrax). Baronness Bertha von Suttner of Austria-Hungary won the Peace Prize or her founding of the Gesellschaft der Friedensfreunde; Henryk Sienkiewicz; Henryk Sienkiewicz of Poland, author of Quo Vadis: A Narrative of the Time of Nero, won the prize for Literature.

== December 11, 1905 (Monday) ==
- Inspired by the revolt in Moscow Uprising, the Council of Workers' Deputies of Kiev staged a mass uprising, establishing the Shuliavka Republic in the city, and would last until December 16.
- After getting angry about the prize of sugar sold at the Grand Bazaar in Tehran (now the capital of Iran), the Ottoman governor ordered the public beating of 17 prominent merchants. The operators of the Bazaar closed down the marketplace in protest, and would be a factor in the igniting of the Persian Constitutional Revolution.
- Born: Gilbert Roland (stage name for Luis Antonio Dámaso de Alonso), Mexican-born film and TV actor Ciudad Juárez (d. 1994)
- Died: Edward Atkinson, 78, U.S. activist and founder of the American Anti-Imperialist League, known for campaigning against the U.S. annexation of the Philippines

== December 12, 1905 (Tuesday) ==
- Elections were held in Portugal for the 148-seat Câmara dos Senhores Deputados. The Partido Progressista of Prime Minister José Luciano de Castro won 109 seats or more than 73 percent.
- The American Woolen Company, the leading producer of wool for garments in the U.S., announced it would increase the wages of its 30,000 employees by 10 percent, effective January 1.
- Sir James Sadler was appointed as the administrator of the British East Africa Protectorate, now the nation of Kenya.
- Former U.S. Congressman John F. Fitzgerald (whose grandson and namesake, John Fitzgerald Kennedy, would be elected the 35th President of the United States in 1960) was elected Mayor of Boston.
- Born:
  - Mother Bridget Sequeira, Persian-born Pakistani Franciscan nun and founder of the Franciscan Missionaries of Christ the King; in Bushehr (d. 1987)
  - E. L. Mascall, British Anglican Catholic theologian; in London (d. 1993)

== December 13, 1905 (Wednesday) ==
- The first elections were held in Canada's new Province of Saskatchewan, and the Liberal Party, led by Walter Scott won 17 of the 25 seats.
- U.S. President Roosevelt announced the engagement of his daughter, Alice, to U.S. Representative Nicholas Longworth of Ohio.
- Born: Ilya Trauberg, Soviet Russian film director; in Odessa, Russian Empire (d. of heart attack, 1948)

== December 14, 1905 (Thursday) ==
- Russian Army General Vladimir Bekman spared the town of Tukums, in Russian-controlled Latvia, after residents had voluntarily abandoned a nationalist uprising. Departing from the standard Russian Imperial policy of merciless reprisals against secessionists, General Bekman chose not to burn the town to the ground after having had 62 rifles and 45 revolvers surrendered to him, and reported the incident to Tsar Nicholas II. The Tsar wrote in the margin of the report, "This is no reason. The city should have been destroyed."
- Born: William Schneiderman, Russian-born American Communist who was the subject of the U.S. Supreme Court decision in Schneiderman v. United States, later a party in the Supreme Court case of Stack v. Boyle; (d. 1985)
- Died: General Herman Haupt, 88, Superintendent of the Military Railroad in the U.S. Department of War who guided the prompt repair and guarding of railroad lines, bridges and telegraph communications during the American Civil War. Haupt died while traveling on a train in New Jersey.

== December 15, 1905 (Friday) ==
- The Pushkin House was established in Saint Petersburg, Russia, to preserve the cultural heritage of Alexander Pushkin.
- Born: Manzoor Nomani, Indian Islamic scholar; in Sambhal, United Provinces of Agra and Oudh, British India (now Uttar Pradesh state in India) (d. 1997)

== December 16, 1905 (Saturday) ==
- In the sport of rugby union, the "Match of the Century" was played between two best international teams in the world at the time, Wales and New Zealand at Cardiff Arms Park. Wales won, 3 to 0 before a crowd of 47,000 people, after Teddy Morgan scored on a try in the first half. The game marked the only loss out of 35 matches on New Zealand's 1905-06 world tour.
- A cyclone killed 30 people on the Comoros islands, and injured 150 others.
- British Prime Minister Henry Campbell-Bannerman dissolved the House of Commons and called for elections to take place on January 12.
- French Prime Minister Maurice Rouvier's policy on French Morocco was given approval by the Chamber of Deputies.
- British Prime Minister
- Born: Billy Arnold, American racecar driver and winner of the 1930 Indianapolis 500; in Chicago (d. 1976)

== December 17, 1905 (Sunday) ==
- The New York City press took notice of the gradual transformation of the Harlem neighborhood of the city predominantly black area of Manhattan Island, as a result of a victory for the African-American community in a successful fight Philip A. Payton Jr.'s Afro-American Realty Company, and the white-owned Hudson River Realty Company. In April, the Hudson company had purchased three apartment houses on West 135th Street between 5th Avenue and Lenox Avenue and issued eviction notices to the African-American tenants. Payton retaliated the same day by issuing eviction notices to the white tenants in its two buildings on 30 and 32 West 135th Street, By December, Hudson River Realty had been forced to sell the three apartment buildings to Afro-American Realty Within the next 20 years, white property owners moved out as some sold their buildings at a loss or boarded them up, rather than to rent or sell to black people and "A negro colony spread from the concentrated area around Payton's original buildings on 134th Street, until it became an onslaught no wall could contain."
- Born: Simo Häyhä, Finnish military sniper known for his individual killing of over 500 enemy soldiers during the 103-day Winter War between Finland and the Soviet Union in 1939 and 1940; in Rautjärvi, Grand Duchy of Finland, Russian Empire (d. 2002)
- Died: James B. Simmons, 78, American Baptist minister who had endowed Abilene Baptist College in Texas after its founding in 1891. The institution was renamed Simmons College in 1892 and, after contributions from Mary and John G. Hardin, has been named Hardin–Simmons University since 1934.

== December 18, 1905 (Monday) ==
- English archaeologist Edward R. Ayrton discovered "Tomb KV47", prepared for the Egyptian pharaoh Siptah, 31 centuries the tomb had been closed. Siptah's mummy had been found in 1898 by Victor Loret. Ayton had been excavating the area by having trenches dug at the direction of expedition leader Theodore M. Davis, and on the day of discovery, found the top of a flight of steps that led down to the burial chamber.
- The Moscow uprising was suppressed by the Russian Army after 11 days. Major General Sergei Sheydeman issued an order the same day against further action, directing that "If armed resistance is provided, then exterminate everyone without arresting anyone." ("Если будет оказано вооружённое сопротивление, то истреблять всех, не арестовывая никого").
- The only railroad line to serve the small southern African kingdom of Lesotho was opened, connecting the capital city at Maseru to South Africa's Bloemfontein–Bethlehem line.

== December 19, 1905 (Tuesday) ==
- The first Parliament of Montenegro, the 60-seat Narodna Skupština, was opened by Prince Nicholas I and charged with transforming the principality into a constitutional monarchy. Lazar Mijušković was sworn in during the session as the first elected Prime Minister of Montenegro.
- Inventor Henry Sandell received U.S. Patent No. 807,871 for the first self-playing violin. The "Automatic Virtuosa" was marketed by the Mills Novelty Company.
- Born:
  - Irving Kahn, American investor and philanthropist, co-founder of the Kahn Brothers Group; in New York City (d. 2015)
  - Norman D. Vaughan, American dogsled driver and explorer who provided transportation in Admiral Richard E. Byrd's Antarctic Expedition of 1928—1930; in Salem, Massachusetts (d. 2005). Mount Vaughan in Antarctica was named in his honor.
  - Frank Forsyth, English film and television actor; in London (d. 1984)
- Died: Henry Harland, 44, American novelist who also wrote under the pen name Sidney Luska, died of tuberculosis.

== December 20, 1905 (Wednesday) ==
- Greece received a new premier as former Prime Minister Georgios Theotokis formed a cabinet of ministers to replace Dimitrios Rallis.
- Baron Géza Fejérváry, announced his resignation as Prime Minister of Hungary within the Dual Kingdom of Austria-Hungary, along with his entire cabinet. King Ferenc József of Hungary (Emperor Franz Joseph of Austria) refused to accept the resignation.

== December 21, 1905 (Thursday) ==
- Korea received its first Japanese Resident-General after becoming a protectorate of the Empire of Japan, as former Prime Minister Itō Hirobumi assumed the office. Ito's assassination on October 26, 1909, would become a pretext for the annexation of Korea by Japan.
- Born: Anthony Powell, English novelist known for his 12-volume work of fiction, A Dance to the Music of Time; in London (d. 2000)
- Died:
  - Richard Hodgson, 50, American parapsychologist
  - August von Eisenhart, 79, primary spokesman for Bavaria's "Mad King Ludwig"

== December 22, 1905 (Friday) ==
- Representatives of Canada's Presbyterian, Methodist and Congregationalist churches agreed upon a plan of union.
- Japan and China signed a commercial treaty.
- Strikes within Russia spread with a walkout of 125,000 workers in Saint Petersburg.
- Born: Kenneth Rexroth, American poet dubbed by Time magazine as the father of the Beat Generation movement; in South Bend, Indiana (d. 1982)
- Died: John N. Irwin, 62, former Territorial Governor of Idaho (1883) and of Arizona (1890-1892)

== December 23, 1905 (Saturday) ==
- The United Kingdom established trade with the Kingdom of Bulgaria.
- The Tampere conference, where Vladimir Lenin and Joseph Stalin meet for the first time, is held in Tampere, Finland.

== December 24, 1905 (Sunday) ==
- Russian Prime Minister Sergei Witte and his cabinet members published a decree, consistent with Tsar Nicholas II's October Manifesto, providing the guidelines for the Imperial Duma, the first elected parliament in Russia's history. Because Russia still used the Julian calendar, the "old style" date was December 14 and not observed as Christmas Eve in Russia.
- Born:
  - Howard Hughes, American pilot, engineer and eccentric billionaire; in Houston (d. 1976)
  - Hendrik Wade Bode, American engineer who perfected electronic data transmission and automated weapons systems; in Madison, Wisconsin (d. 1982)

== December 25, 1905 (Monday) ==
- An experimental college football game was played in Wichita, Kansas between Fairmount College (now Wichita State University) and Washburn College to test a suggested rule change, from three tries to gain of five yards for a first down, to requiring the offensive team to advance the ball 10 yards on three tries. Doubling the distance meant that very few first downs were made and that punts were more frequent, and the final score was 0 to 0. The game also saw the first experiment in allowing teams to throw the forward pass, with Fairmount's Bill Davis completing a pass to Art Solter.
- The American operetta Mlle. Modiste, with music by Victor Herbert and libretto by Henry Blossom, and Miss Fritzi Scheff singing in the title role, was performed on Broadway for the first time, premiering at the Knickerbocker Theatre.

== December 26, 1905 (Tuesday) ==
- The Imperial Japanese Navy launched the battle cruiser Teukuba, Japan's first armored cruiser to have been constructed entirely without foreign-made parts.

== December 27, 1905 (Wednesday) ==
- In Russian Poland, at the city of Ostrovets (now Ostrowiec), Ignacy Boerner and the Polish Socialist Party proclaimed the "Ostrowiec Republic" in defiance of rule of Russia by Tsar Nicholas II. The area was retaken 14 days later by two infantry regiments of the Imperial Russian Army.
- Born: Cliff Arquette, American comedian and actor known for creating the character "Charley Weaver"; in Toledo, Ohio (d. 1974)
- Died: Louis Dalrymple, 39, U.S. cartoonist, died of syphilitic paresis that had caused him to become insane.

== December 28, 1905 (Thursday) ==
- Henry MacCracken, Chancellor of New York University convened a meeting of representatives of 62 universities and colleges to agree upon changes in the game of college football, and agreed to form the Intercollegiate Athletic Association of the United States (IAAUS), which would formally be constituted on March 31, 1906. In 1910, it would be renamed the National Collegiate Athletic Association (NCAA).
- Born:
  - Franz Wasner, Austrian Roman Catholic priest who served as the manager and director of the Trapp Family Singers; fictionalized in the stage and film hit The Sound of Music as "Max Detweiler"; in Feldkirchen bei Mattighofen (d. 1992)
  - T. K. Ramanuja Kavirajar, Indian Tamil language poet and author; in Tinnevelly, Madras Province, British India (now Tirunelveli, Tamil Nadu state) (d. 1985)

== December 29, 1905 (Friday) ==
- Carlos Morales resigned as President of the Republic of Santo Domingo (now the Dominican Republic) and was succeeded by his vice-president, Ramón Cáceres.
- Died: Charles T. Yerkes, 68, financier who provided the capital for the construction of mass transportation by street railway in Chicago (in 1886) and the Underground subway in London (1900), as well as the Hale Telescope in the Yerkes Observatory

== December 30, 1905 (Saturday) ==
- At Caldwell, Idaho, a bomb killed former Idaho Governor Frank Steunenberg. As he was opening the gate to his front yard, a charge of dynamite was detonated, and Steunenberg, who had been governor from 1897 to 1901, died 20 minutes later. The investigation would lead to a trial against leaders of the Western Federation of Miners.
- Franz Lehár's operetta The Merry Widow was first performed, premiering at the Theater an der Wien in Vienna.

== December 31, 1905 (Sunday) ==
- U.S. explorer Walter Wellman, who had led two failed expeditions (in 1894 and 1898) aimed at trying to be the first person to reach the North Pole, announced a new plan to travel to the still-unconquered Pole by airship. Wellman's employer, the Chicago Record-Herald, provided $250,000 in funding to build a powered airship, the America and to fund the expedition. Wellman's expedition would depart Spitsbergen for the Pole on September 2, 1907, but be turned back by bad weather. A second attempt on August 15, 1909, would fail within hours.
- Born: Jule Styne, English-born American composer of multiple Broadway musicals, known for melodies to popular songs including "Let It Snow!", "People" and "The Party's Over"; in London (d. 1994)
