= Giza Zoo =

Zoological garden in Giza, Egypt

- Interactive map of Giza Zoo
- Date opened: 1891 (135 years ago)
- Location: Giza, Egypt
- Land area: 80 acres (32 ha)
- No. of animals: 6,000
- No. of species: 175
- Annual visitors: 3.4 million (2007)
- Memberships: PAAZAB
- Owner: Egyptian Government
- Website: www.gizazoo-eg.com

The Giza Zoo (Egyptian Arabic: حديقة حيوان الجيزه, romanized: Ḥadīqat Ḥaywān Al-Gīzah) is a zoological garden in Giza, Egypt. It is one of the few green areas in the city, and includes Giza's largest park. The zoo covers about 80 acres (32 ha), and is home to many endangered species, as well as a selection of endemic fauna.

The first to be built in the Middle East and Africa, rare species have been successfully bred in the zoo—including the first California sea lion to be born in the region and the third oldest zoo worldwide.

== History ==
The zoo was built by Khedive Ismail and opened on 1 March 1891. It was built on about 50 feddan (21 hectares (52 acres)) that was once part of the harem gardens. Ismail imported many plants from India, Africa, and South America, of which a banyan tree planted about 1871 can still be seen. The original 180 birds and 78 other animals in the zoo's collection were taken from Ismail's private menagerie.

In the late 1870s, the state took over the zoo as partial payment of the Ismail's debts. In January 1890, the harem building was opened as a natural history museum, and was used in this manner until a new museum was opened in Tahrir Square in 1902. The portion of the gardens facing the Nile were sold to the public for large homes, but the harem gardens were kept intact.

When the zoo was built, the exhibits with semi-natural habitats were considered spacious by European standards. The animal collection emphasized Egyptian species, and at one time claimed 20,000 individuals representing 400 species, though many of these may have been migratory birds.

Around 1900, Captain Stanley Smyth Flower was appointed director of the Gardens. He would remain in that position until his retirement in 1923. From 1906 to 1923, Michael John Nicoll was his assistant. For a short time he was director, but the next year he had to retire. J. Lewis Bonhote worked at the Gardens from 1913 to 1919.

By the mid-twentieth century, the zoo was considered one of the best zoos in the world, but it has had trouble adapting to the pressures of growth in the latter half of the century as human populations in Cairo have increased.

By the end of World War II the zoo claimed 4,700 exhibits, with a total of 700 mammals and 500 reptiles. Attendance levels of 43,567 in 1889 rose to 223,525 by 1906. In 2007, the zoo hosted almost 3.4 million visitors.

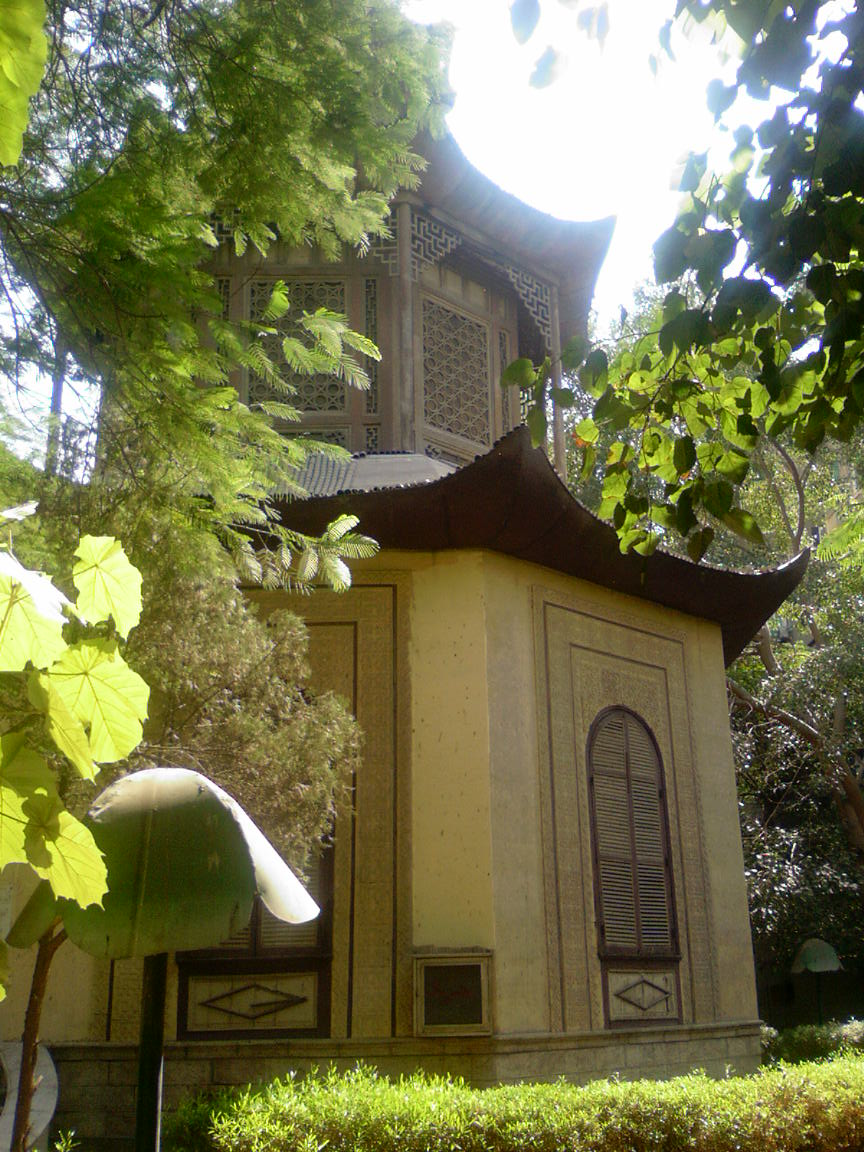
Chinese building at the zoo

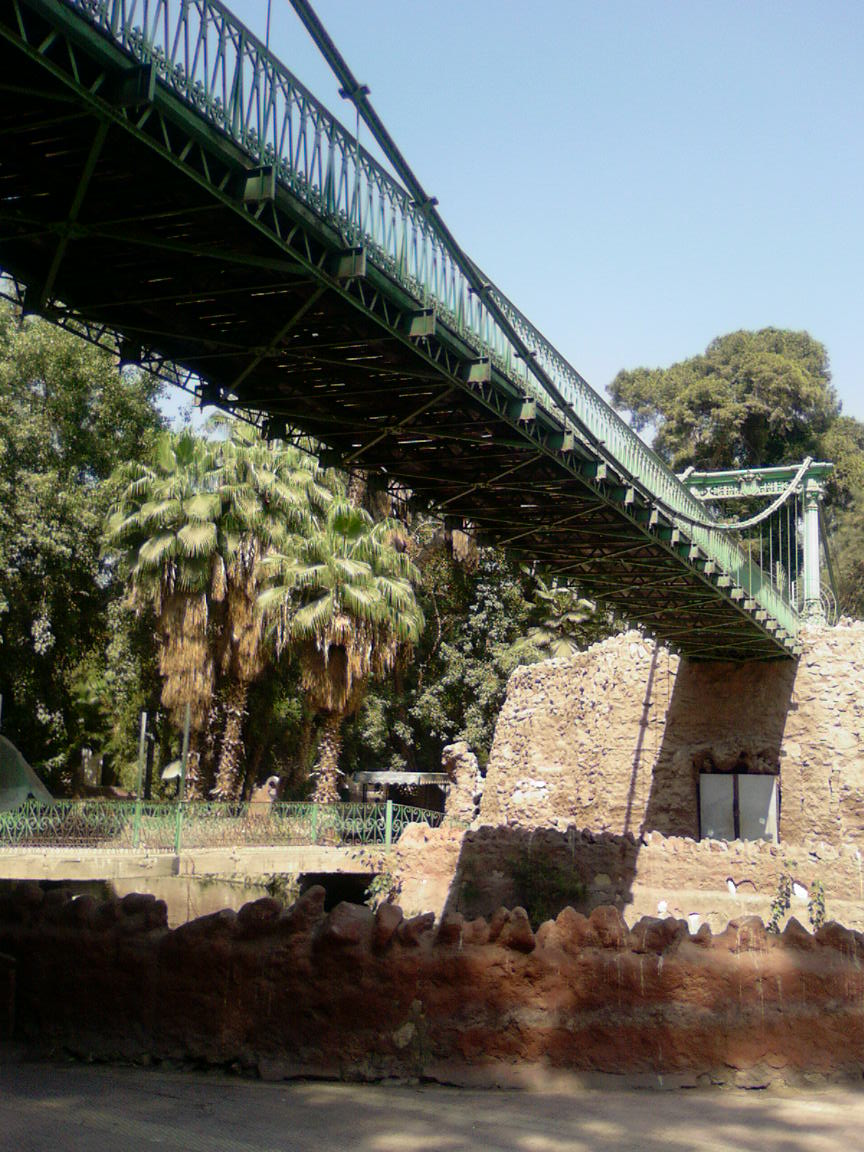
Bridge by Gustave Eiffel

== Animals ==
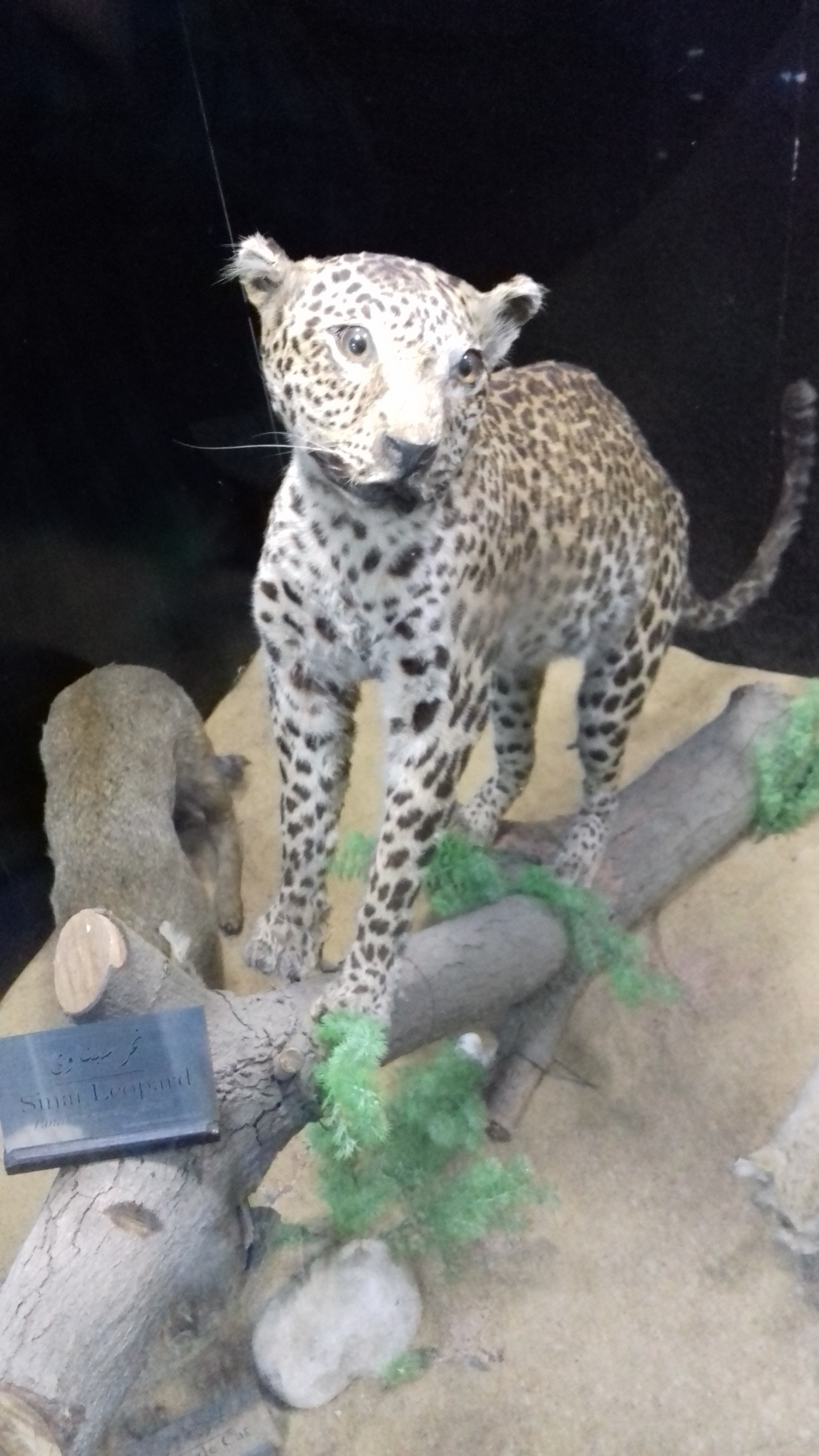
Stuffed leopard from the Sinai Peninsula in the Giza Zoological Museum

Mammals at the zoo include giraffes, southern white rhinos, common hippos, brown bears, black bears, African elephants, sea lions, tigers, lions, cheetahs, zebras, agoutis, monkeys, yellow baboons, Hamadryas baboons, bonobos, red foxes, guinea fowl, parrots, pelicans, ostrichs, emus, Bactrian camels, deer, wild sheep, Dorcas gazelles, gemsboks, scimitar horned oryxes, and raccoons.

The zoo has several species of birds, such as, flamingos, falcons, peacocks, vultures, ibises, love birds, and macaws.

The zoo has native reptiles, such as, the Egyptian cobra and Egyptian tortoise. It also has Nile crocodiles and American alligators.

== Facilities ==
The gardens include roads paved with black stone flags from Trieste, footpaths decorated with pebbles laid out like mosaics, and a pond with a marble island that is now the zoo's Tea Island.

The zoo also includes a suspension bridge designed by Gustave Eiffel that lets visitors view the animals from above. This bridge may have been the first elevated viewing area at any zoo in the world.

== The future ==
As part of the upgrades to help the zoo recover its membership in WAZA, in 2008 the bear exhibit was outfitted with fans and misters to help cool the bears. There are plans to run chilled water through the floors to make the bears more comfortable.

The zoo suffered from neglect for decades, but finally in December 2022, the intention to develop the zoo was announced.

In 2023, Giza Zoo and the adjacent Orman Botanical Garden were closed to the public to undergo a comprehensive redevelopment project under a public–private egyptian partnership "Hadayieq" approved by the Egyptian government.

The redevelopment aims to preserve the zoo's historic buildings and landscapes while modernizing infrastructure, upgrading animal habitats to meet international welfare standards, restoring botanical collections, and improving visitor facilities. The project also reconnects Giza Zoo with Orman Botanical Garden through a pedestrian tunnel, recreating the historic connection between the two sites.

According to the Ministry of Agriculture, the redevelopment is being carried out under the supervision of international zoo organizations and with the participation of international consultants in animal welfare, conservation, and heritage restoration.

== See also ==
- Alexandria Zoo
- Africa Safari Park
