= Africa Safari Park =

Safari park in Beheira Governorate, Egypt

- أفريكانو بارك
- Location in Egypt
- 30.7648°N 29.9805°E
- Date opened: 2004
- Location: West Nubariya district, Beheira Governorate, Egypt
- Owner: Tarek A. Makarem
- Management: Private
- Website: africasafaripark.com

Africa Safari Park (Arabic: أفريكانو بارك, romanized: Afrīkānō Bārk), is a privately owned safari park located on the Cairo–Alexandria desert road in Beheira Governorate, Egypt. It opened to visitors in 2004, and was founded by the Egyptian businessman Tarek A. Makarem. It is considered the first open-air zoo in Egypt and the Middle East. Access is restricted to vehicles due to the dangerous nature of many of the animals, although walking is permitted in some cases depending on the animal's threatening condition. The park houses several types of animals, including lions, gorillas, ostriches, gazelles, and others. It also features a large, dark cave containing more than 20 species of birds of prey, reptiles, turtles, bats, and cobras.

== See also ==
- Alexandria Zoo
- Giza Zoo
