= Valhalla (steam yacht, 1892) =

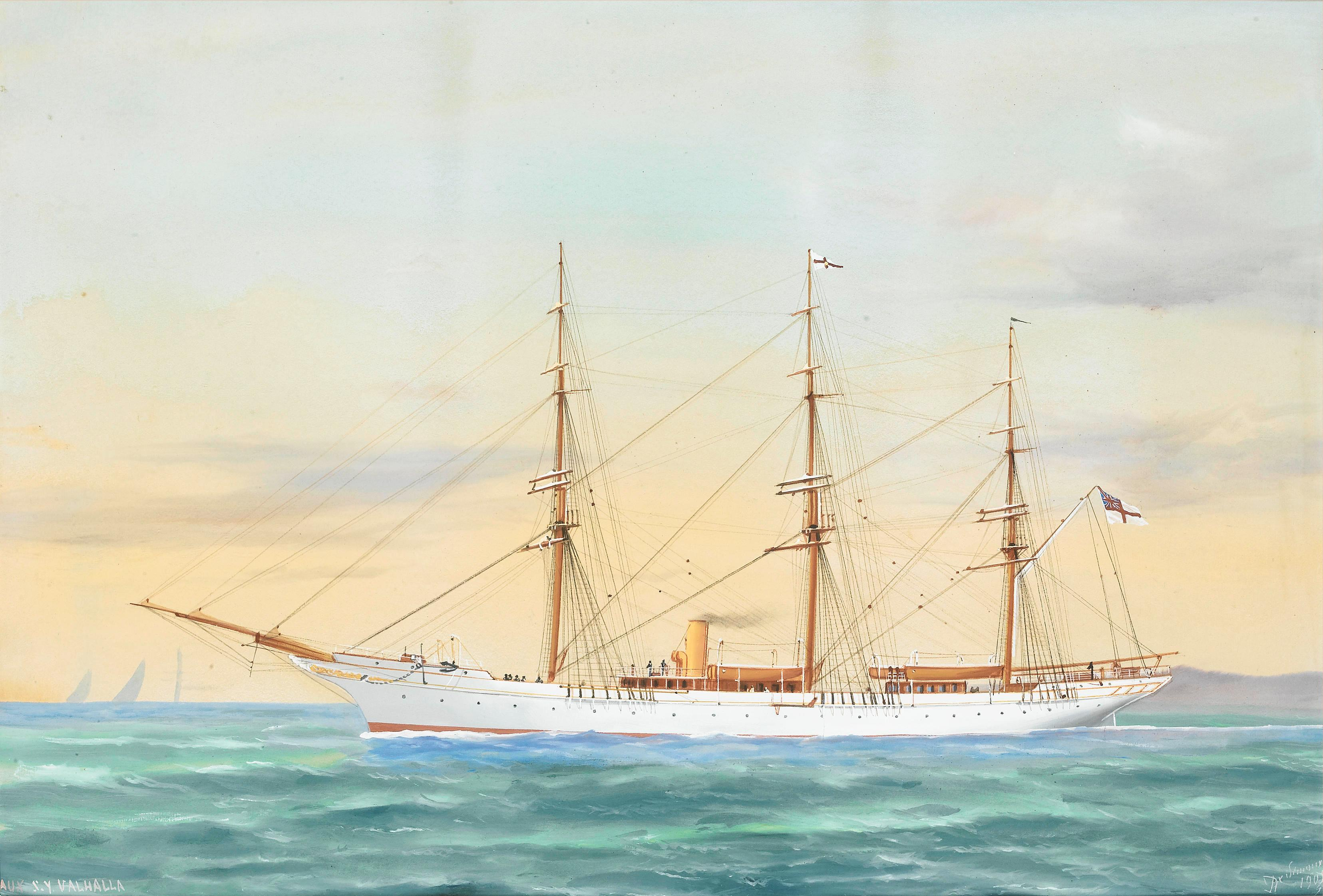
- Valhalla in 1901

History

United Kingdom
- Name: Valhalla
- Owner: Joseph Laycock
- Builder: Ramage & Ferguson, Leith
- Yard number: 117
- Laid down: 1891
- Launched: 20 October 1892
- Acquired: 1892
- Fate: Sold 1897

France
- Name: Valhalla
- Owner: Boniface De Castellane and Anna Gould
- Acquired: 1897
- Fate: Sold August, 1901

United Kingdom
- Owner: James Lindsay, 26th Earl of Crawford
- Acquired: 1901
- Fate: Requisitioned by the Admiralty, 1915

United Kingdom
- Name: HMS Valhalla II
- Owner: George Marvin
- In service: 20 June 1916
- Out of service: 9 September 1919
- Notes: Repair and depot ship
- Name: Valhalla
- Acquired: 1919, by ‘’Merrienne Frères - Alexandre & André - Soc. Merrienne’’
- Fate: Sold
- Notes: Converted to commercial fruit carrier
- Name: Valhalla
- Acquired: by F. Baudoin, Le Havre, France.
- Fate: Foundered 2 December 1921, off Cape St Vincent, Portugal

General characteristics
- Tonnage: 1,219 GRT, 806 NRT
- Length: 239.6 ft (73.0 m)
- Beam: 37.2 ft (446 in)
- Depth: 20.7 ft (6.3 m)
- Installed power: 145 NHP
- Propulsion: 1 × triple-expansion engine; 1 × screw
- Sail plan: Fully rigged
- Armament: 1 × 3-pounder QF gun

Valhalla RYS was a steam yacht, famous for her participation in the Kaiser's Trans-Atlantic Race of 1905, and the sighting of a sea serpent in the Atlantic that same year. She had several owners, most notably Joe Laycock, a trans-Atlantic racing yachtsman and Olympian, and James Lindsay, 26th Earl of Crawford, who employed her as a research vessel on three major voyages from 1902 to 1908. These resulted in the book Three Voyages of a Naturalist : Being an Account of Many Little-Known Islands in Three Oceans Visited by the 'Valhalla' R.Y.S., by M.J. Nicoll, published in 1908. During World War I she served with the Royal Navy as a part of the Eastern Mediterranean fleet's Aegean Squadron during the Gallipoli campaign. After the War she became a French-owned fruit carrier, before being wrecked off Cape St. Vincent in 1922.

== Ownership by Joe Laycock ==
Her first owner was Capt. J. F. Laycock of Bawtry, Portsmouth, a British Army officer and Olympic sailor. Laycock, a member of the Royal Yacht Squadron at Cowes, he commissioned Ramage & Ferguson of Leith in 1892 to build him a steel auxiliary three masted steam yacht. Laycock had envisioned his own private clipper ship, a three-quarter sized version of Cutty Sark. He drew up some basic outline plans, and handed them over to Mr. W. C. Storey, who produced detailed plans for both the yacht, and its auxiliary power unit. The design had its critics, but the ship was found to have excellent sailing qualities. She is believed by many to have been the finest example of a steam auxiliary ever built.

Valhalla launched from the Victoria Shipyard on 20 October 1892. At 1,218 tons gross, she sailed for Southampton for fitting out. She was the only British steam yacht to carry a full ship rig and was originally rigged as a privateer with stun’s’ls. Her ward room, gun-room, and armoury after the manner of RN vessels of century before. Her complement was 96 hands.

Laycock had the yacht fitted with two Hotchkiss cannons and a Maxim machine gun. Most of the crew were ex-Royal Navy and she had aboard a selection of rifles, pistols and cutlasses. For her maiden voyage of 9,632 miles, Laycock and ten idlers embarked from Southampton on 22 March 1893 for Madeira, around the Mediterranean (stopping off at Cannes for a family wedding), Constantinople, the Black Sea to Sevastopol and back to Cowes. In 1894, Laycock had the firm of Howard Cox privately publish The Log of the Valhalla, which covers this voyage in detail.

He took her to Newport, Rhode Island, for the America's Cup of 1895-1896, and gave Lord Dunraven a lift home via New York on 28 September 1895. The race was notable for Dunraven's allegations of cheating by the winning American yacht, Defender.

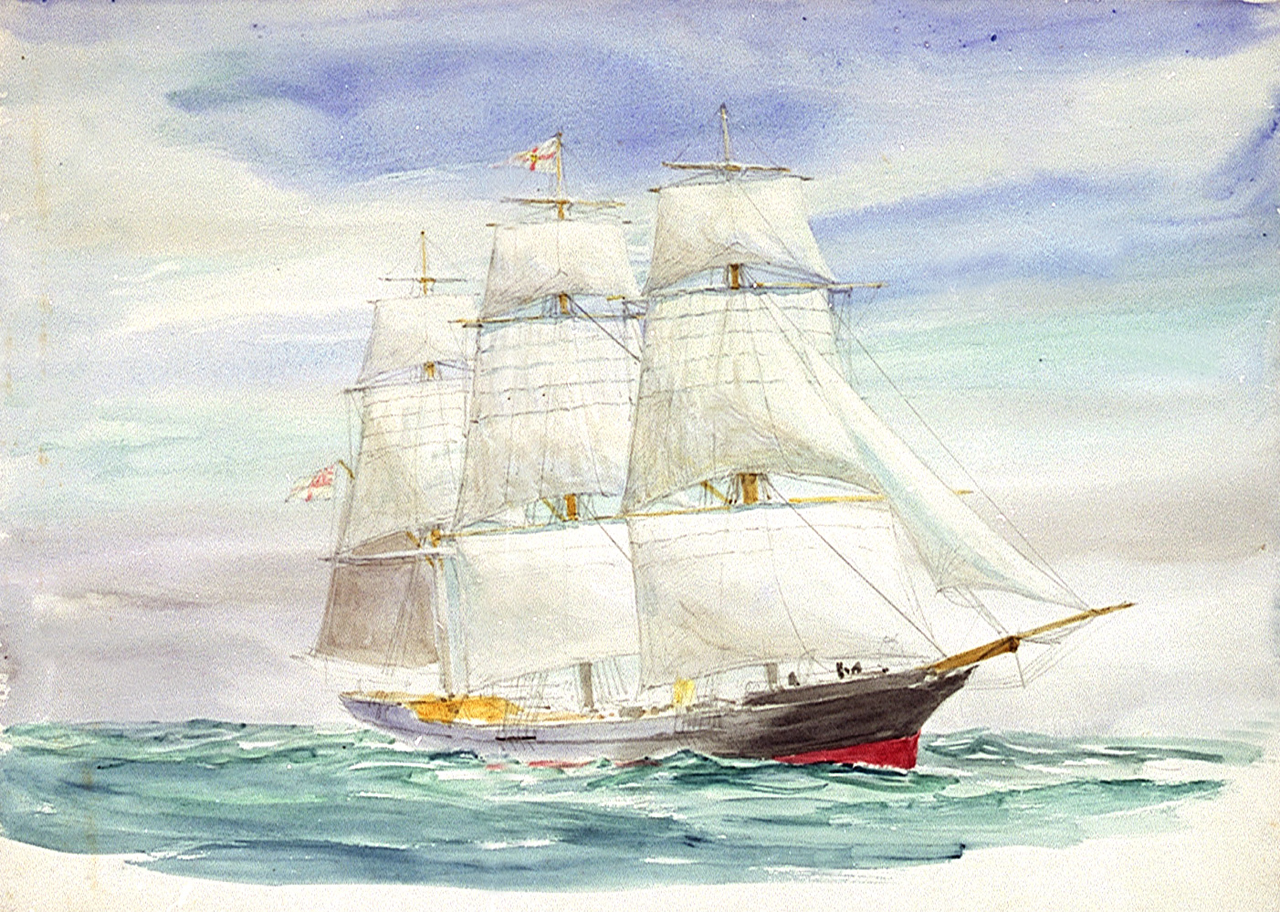
Valhalla as she looked during Laycock's tenure

In October 1896 the Prince of Monaco was negotiating with Laycock for the purchase of the yacht, which he had seen in New York for the America's cup. The Prince wanted her for deep sea and scientific experiments, a role she would later undertake for Crawford.

Laycock eventually sold her in October 1897.

== Ownership by Count Boniface 'Boni' de Castellane ==
Paul Ernest Boniface de Castellane, was a French nobleman and politician. He was known as a leading Belle Époque tastemaker and the first husband of American railroad heiress Anna Gould.

In 1897, the couple acquired Valhalla for 200,000 dollars (6.6 million today). The ship had a crew of 100 men under the orders of a Captain Vidamment and four officers. He and his wife went in 1897 to Norway with the Comte and Comtesse Jacques de Pourtales, the Marquis and Marquise de Chaponnay, and the Prince and Princess de Poix. In the Hardanger and Stavanger Fjords Valhalla encountered the Hohenzollern, as Emperor William II, chanced to be cruising around Norway. The next cruise to the coast of Russia, where they crossed the Baltic to Petrograd, making eighteen knots. They next made a trip through the Mediterranean taking Corsica and Malta in their itinerary. At every port, Counts, Princesses, Grand Dukes and Duchesses were entertained on board. It was on Valhalla, at Cowes, that Boni gave a regal fête to King Edward, then Prince of Wales. Four hundred tea roses brought from London adorned the portholes.

In August 1901 the yacht was sold to Lord Crawford.

== Ownership by Lord Crawford ==
James Lindsay, 26th Earl of Crawford registered her in London in 1902. Like Laycock, he was a member of the Royal Yacht Squadron at Cowes. He was the owner of several private yachts that he used for scientific expeditions.

The Earl suffered from asthma, arthritis, and rheumatism, and found that sailing in southern waters over the winter months was a means of seeking relief. He also had a keen interest in astronomy, and had sailed to Mauritius to observe the 1874 transit of Venus.

When Crawford bought her, he retained her full ship rig in the world but did away with the and replaced them with double topsails instead of single so she could be worked with less labour. Her crew was reduced to 65. He also changed the old-fashioned belowdeck arrangement. Valhalla in 1902-1908, displaced 1700 tons, and was fitted with an auxiliary screw (1-Screw. T.3 cylinder 18 1/2, 27 1/4 & 47 – 33 inch) 145 nhp). She was capable under power of a speed of 10 1/2 to 11 knots per hour; and under sail she could peak at 16 knots per hour. She was equipped with roomy cabins with ample headroom and had a freezing room capable of storing many tons of meat for long periods.

Crawford was to use her most notably for three world voyages, totaling 72,000 miles.

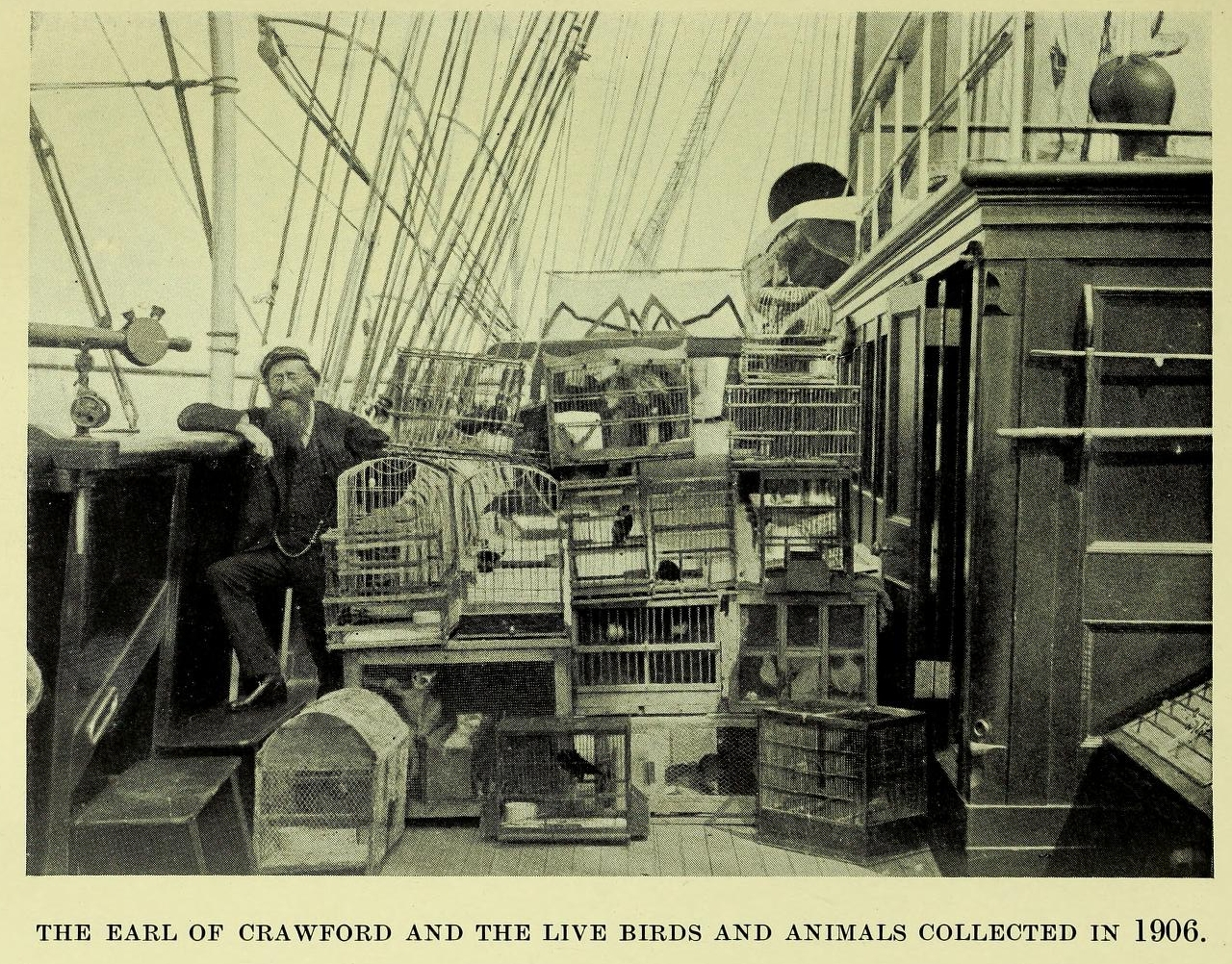
Lord Crawford aboard his yacht Valhalla in 1906

He first planned a world cruise for the winter of 1902. At the time he had an interest in the British Museum and a fellow trustee suggested that he make use of the voyage and collect items for the Natural History Department, and oceanographic research. Crawford employed an ornithologist, Michael John Nicoll to assist with the project. They were to embark on three such voyages, and Nicoll would go on to chronicle them, in his book Three voyages of a naturalist, being an account of many little-known islands in three oceans visited by the "Valhalla," R.Y.S., published with a foreword by Crawford in 1908.

The first voyage a round the world cruise left Cowes on 19 November 1902, she took in coal at Lisbon, carried onto Madeira, the Canary Islands and the Cape Verde Islands. On to the east coast of South America, stopping at Bahia, Montevideo, via the Straits of Magellan to Valparaíso in Chile. She then struck west for 8,000 miles through the Southern Pacific islands, Easter Island, Pitcairn, Tahiti, Tutuila, Apia, Suva, Thursday Island, Singapore, Colombo, Aden, Suez, Port Said, Gibraltar, and back to Cowes by 1 August 1903. In 8 months she covered 38,000 miles. Off Cape Guardafui, a sudden whirlwind snapped off the jibboom.

The second Valhalla voyage was to the West Indies and the Gulf of Mexico. Leaving Cowes on 18 December 1903, starting at Barbados it took all the island in, then sailed up to Jamaica, the Caymans and Cuba, before arriving at Florida for tarpon fishing and coaling at Key West returning via Bermuda and the Azores to Cowes by 8 May 1904. They collected over 400 birds.

In 1905 she took a respectable "easy third" place in the famous German Emperor’s Cup, despite being, by far, the largest participant. She crossed the Atlantic from Sandy Hook, to the Lizard under sail in only 14 days and 2 hours. All this despite competition afforded by much faster schooners taking part.

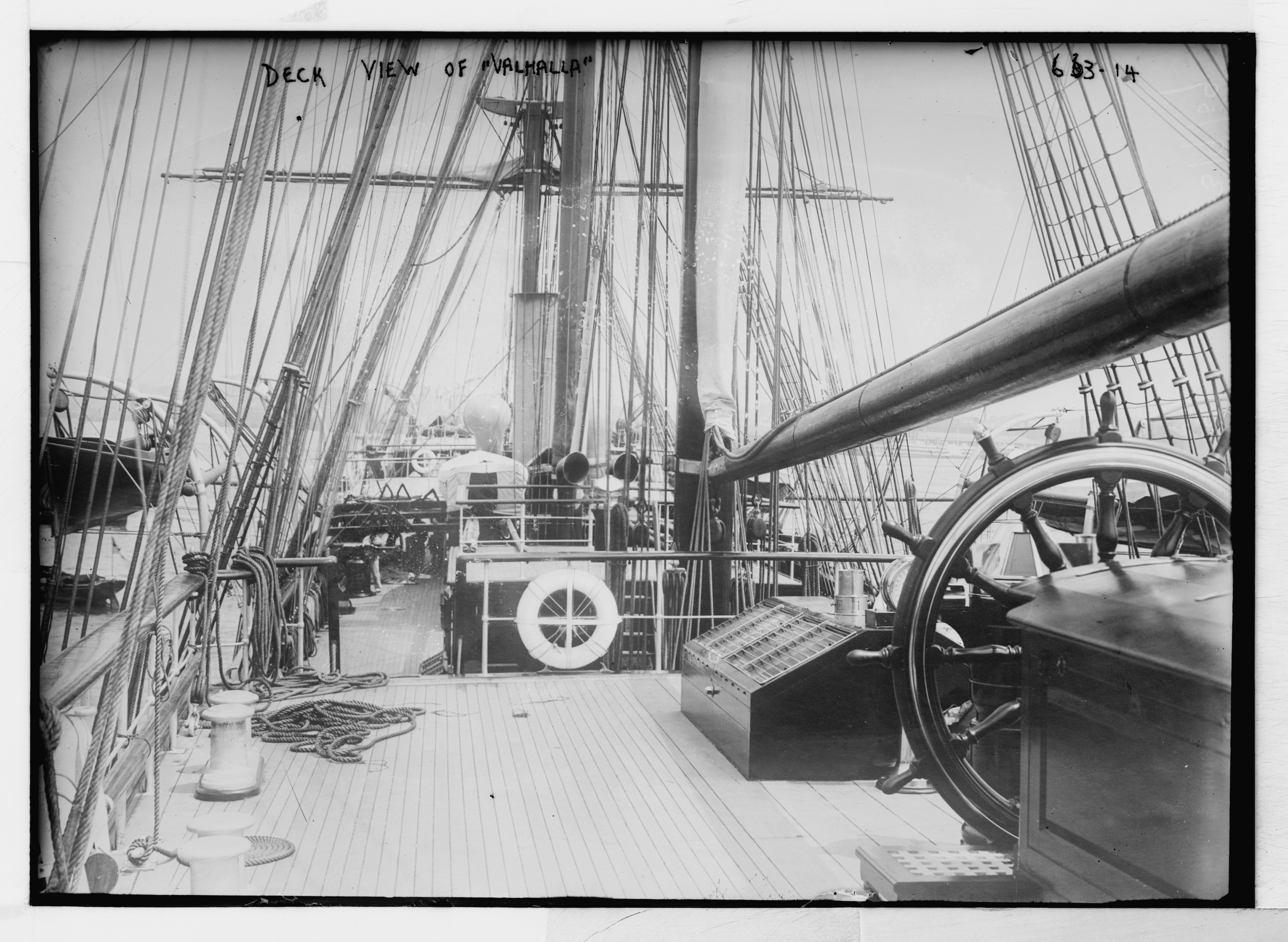
Deck of Valhalla

The third Crawford voyage was loosely inspired by the voyages of the Flying Dutchman. Crawford and Nicoll would arrange another scientist, Edmund Meade-Waldo, to join them on the expedition. Valhalla left Cowes on 8 November 1905. Calling in at Las Palmas, running off the Florida coast, St. Pauls's Rocks, Bahia and then on to the Southern Atlantic islands, and the Southern Indian Ocean where two cyclones on the Madagascar coast, before arriving at the Seychelles. She returned home via the Suez Canal by 13 May 1906. This was to be the most successful trip from a scientific standpoint, collecting many new species.

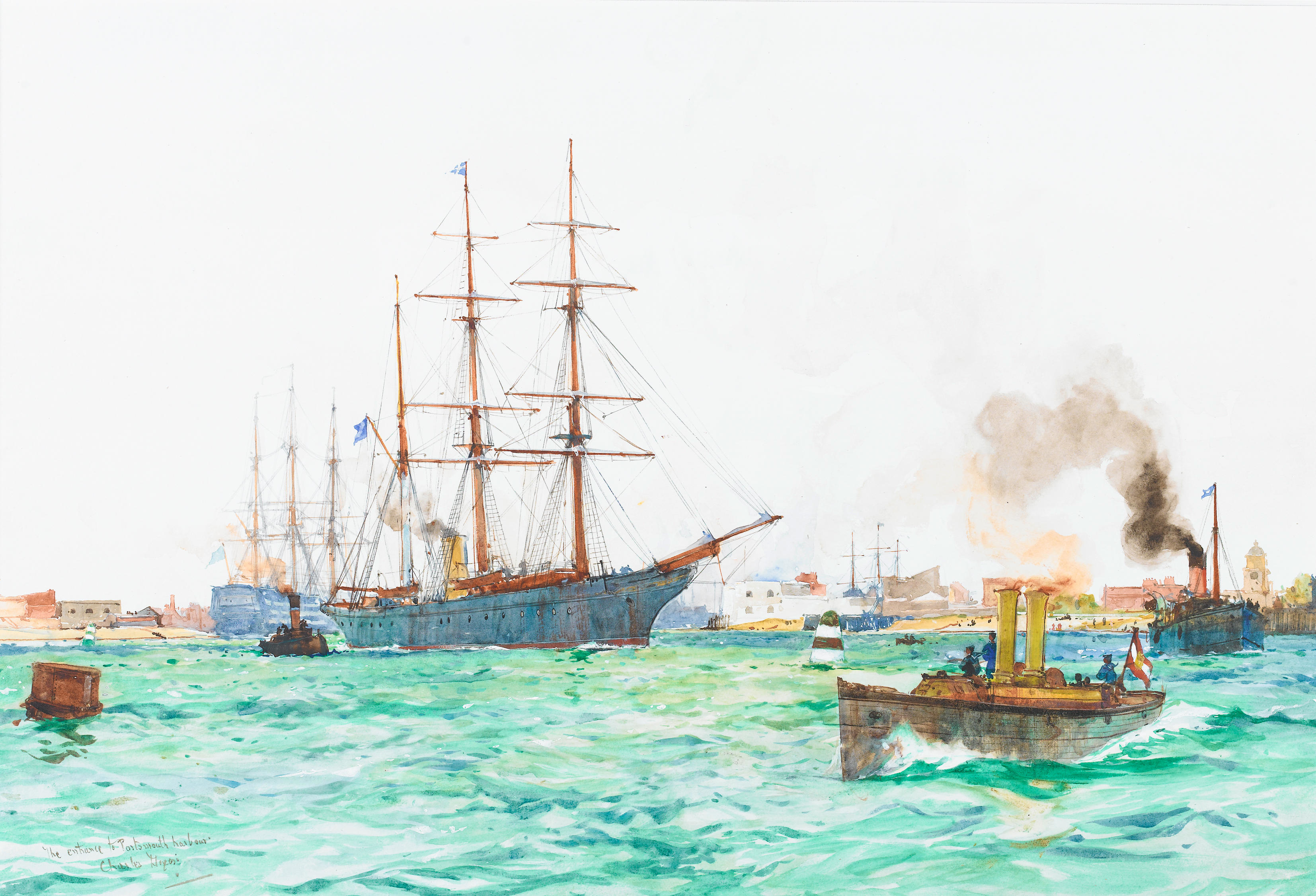
Valhalla shortly before the First World War at Portsmouth

During this particular voyage on 7 December 1905 at around 10:15 am as the yacht, was cruising off the Florida coast a "large fin, or frill, sticking out of the water", was spotted several times. The frill was a good six feet in length and stood nearly two feet above the surface of the water. "A great neck rose out of the water in front of the frill," noted Meade-Waldo; its neck looked to be about the thickness of a man's body. The creature moved both its head and neck from side to side in a peculiar way. This "great sea-serpent" incident became famous and caused much interest back home in Britain. Three days later Happy Warrior, a merchant sailing ship, reported a similar sighting, a "sea snake of great magnitude appeared off our port bow. Was several lengths of our ship. Had long neck. Sounded after few minutes. Estimated speed six knots." Happy Warrior was only 80 miles from where Valhalla had sighted its creature. A similar 200 foot long creature was also seen in 1906.

She was last registered in London by Crawford in 1908. In 1911 she was re-registered at Cowes.

== World War I service ==
In 1915, she was leased by the Royal Navy from her then owner George Marvin. George Marvin & sons owned a successful yacht stores business in Cowes. She was renamed Valhalla II in February 1917, as her name had been allocated to another ship.

She was to serve as a repair and depot ship, Pendant No 088. 1219grt/1490TM. Armament: 4 × 12-pdr. In service 20 June 1916 – 9 September 1919, as a repair and depot ship 1917. Before her repair ship role, she may have served as wireless-equipped A/P Group Leader or in special yacht squadrons, at home or in Mediterranean. including a period at Limnos, in the Aegean, during the Gallipoli campaign.

The HMT Andrew Marvel (H466), a hired trawler from Hull fitted with a 12-pound gun, used for mine sweeping duties, during her service between March 1915 and July 1918, was attached to her.

In 1919 the British naval register was closed.

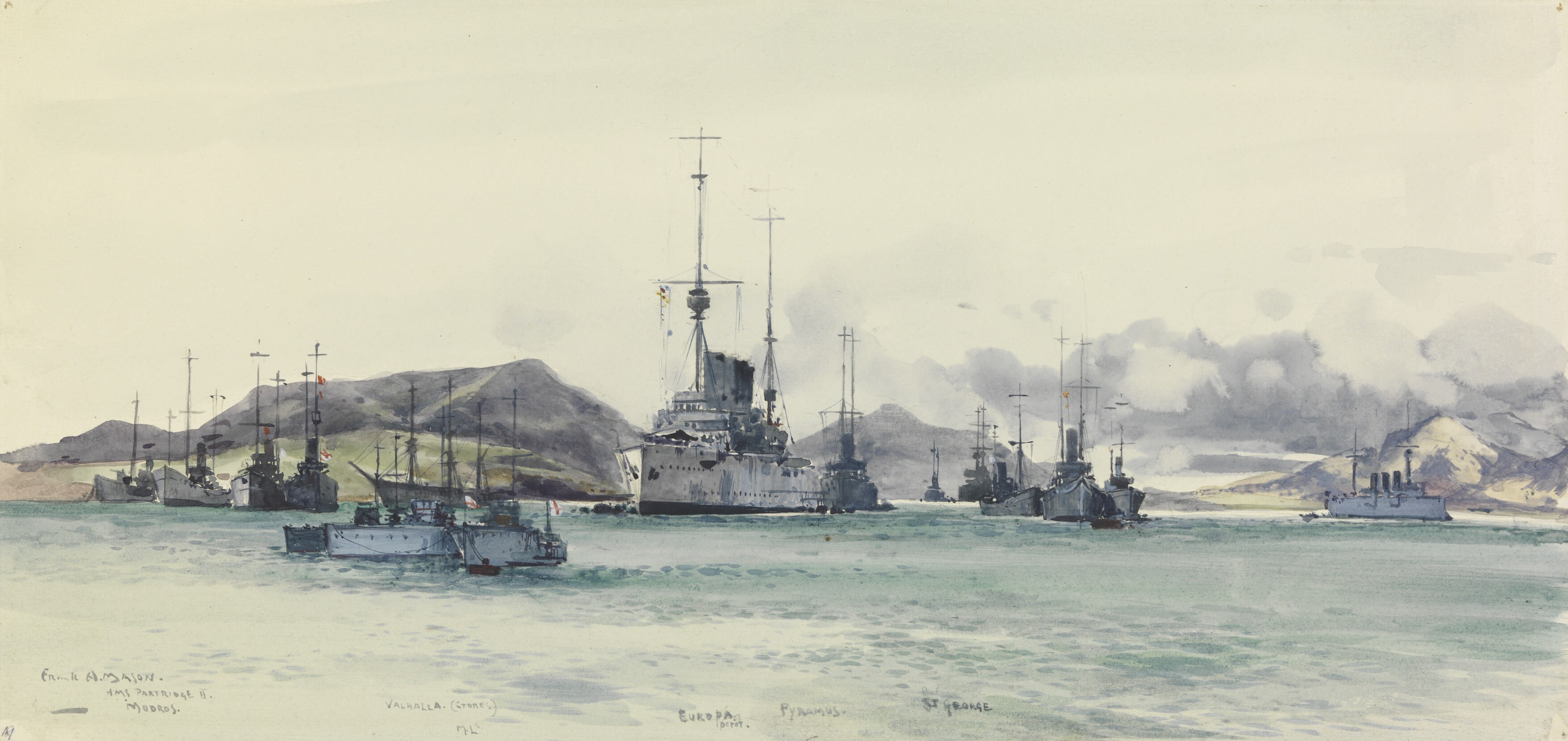
Mudros Harbour (south) and Valhalla on duty

== Postwar ==
After the war, Valhalla was sold to a French company, Merrienne Frères - Alexandre & André - Soc. Merrienne and converted into a fruit carrier. Her new owners registered her as a 1170 GRT steamer.

At some point her ownership was transferred to F. Baudoin, of Le Havre, France, and it was under her tenure that, while carrying oranges and wine from Valencia to Dunkirk, she foundered and was wrecked in a storm on 2 December 1921, off Cape St. Vincent.
