= Alexandria Zoo =

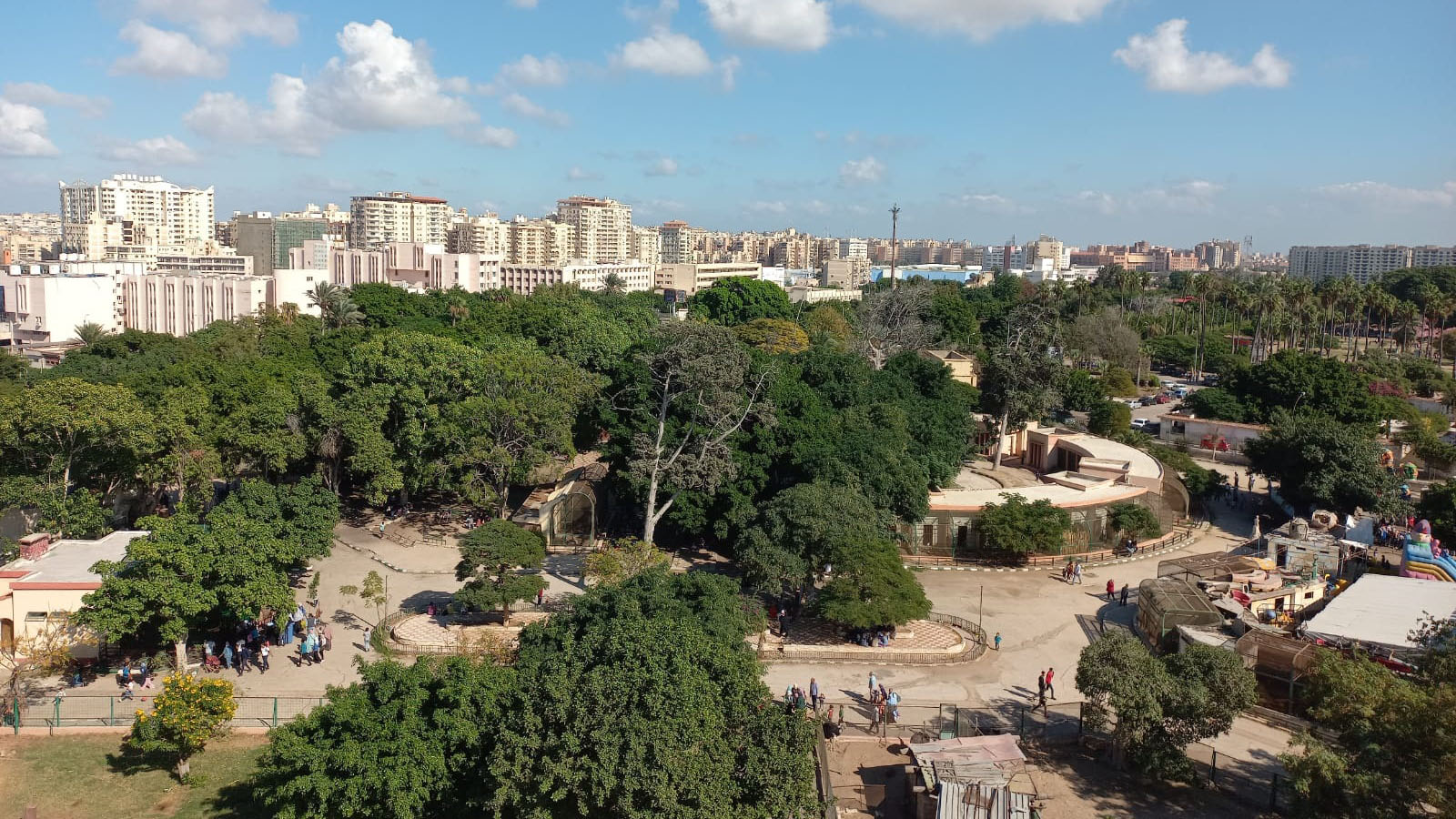
- View of Alexandria Zoo
- Interactive map of Alexandria Zoo
- 31.2050384°N 29.9443692°E
- Date opened: 1958
- Location: Alexandria, Egypt
- Land area: 24 acres (9.7 ha)
- Major exhibits: Hill of Lions, Apes Hill, Swan Lake
- Website: No official Web site available

The Alexandria Zoo (Arabic: حديقة حيوان الإسكندرية) is a zoo close to the Smouha neighborhood in Alexandria, Egypt. The zoo charges an entrance fee, which allows guests to walk around the zoo and view a selection of animals from around the world.

== Animals ==
The species on display include a common hippopotamus, lions, striped hyenas, California sea lions, zebras, scimitar horned oryx, a selection of bears, monkeys, Dromedary camels, Barbary sheep, black leopard, spotted hyena, golden jackal, Bactrian camel, and llama.

== Exhibits ==
The zoo also includes a reptile house and a 'birds and small mammals' section, as well as a museum. The reptile house is home to several endemic Egyptian species, including the Egyptian cobra, the Nile crocodile and the critically endangered Egyptian tortoise.

Several aviaries are home to hawks, eagles, falcons, African crested porcupines and Egyptian mongooses.

== Animal welfare ==
By the early 2000s the zoo was in disrepair from neglect. Animal Aid Egypt, along with a group of volunteers, started helping improve the animals' living conditions. They talked zoo authorities into freeing the zoo's elephant from chains during the day, to roam freely, as well as building her some shade and reinforcing her night quarters. They worked with keepers to improve the chimp's diet and added enrichment to their outside enclosures, and are trying to get wooden floors installed in their night enclosures.

In February 2015, two men entered Alexandria Zoo and beat up hamadryas baboons with sticks as dozens of zoo-goers watched and laughed. Most of the monkeys fled to the top of the enclosure for safety. Several others endured beating by the men as people in the crowd shouted, laughed and clapped. The two men spent a considerable amount of time in the monkey enclosure and no security at the zoo intervened. Eventually, the men left the scene un-apprehended and without suffering any consequences.

== Photo gallery ==
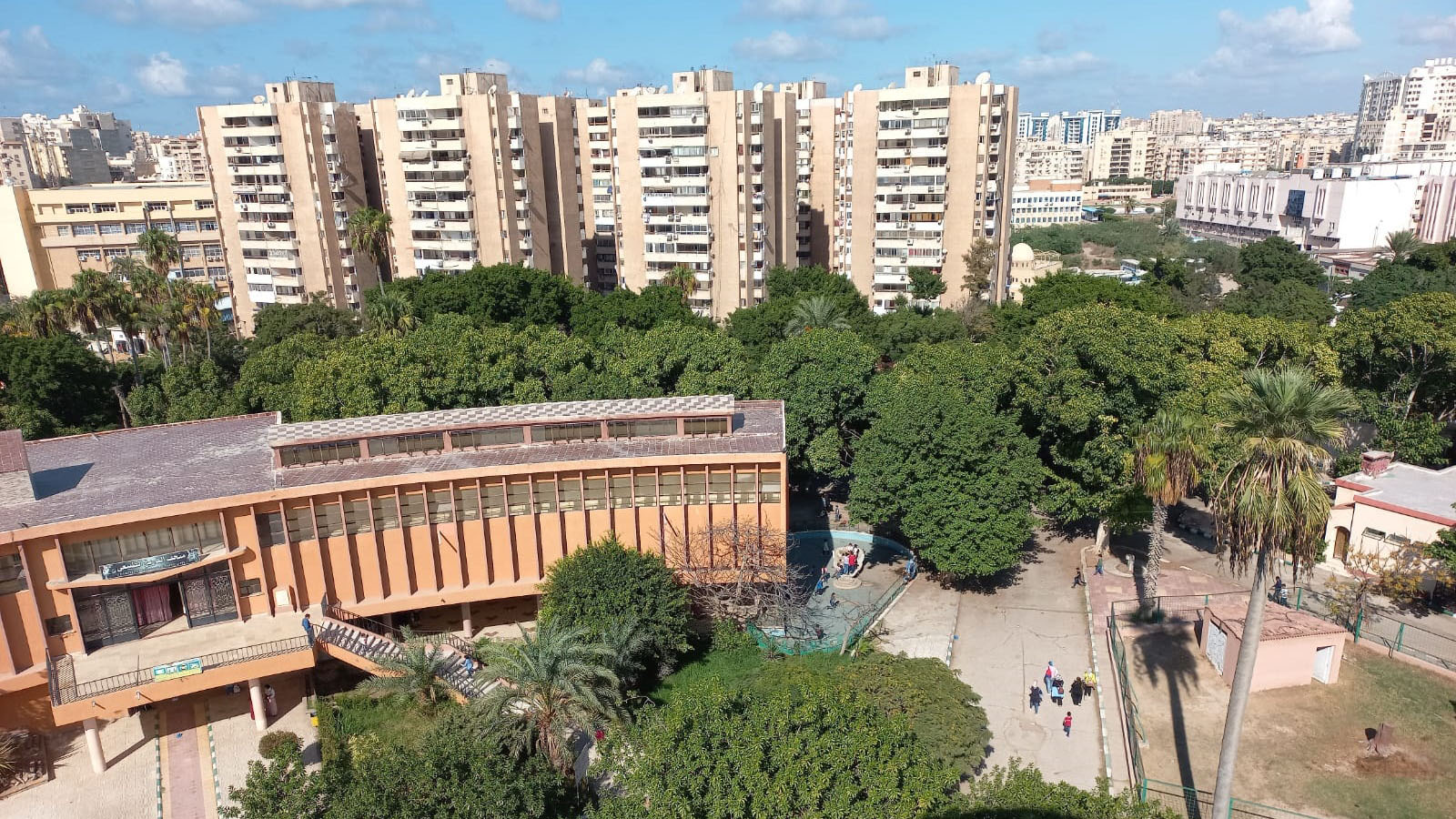
General view

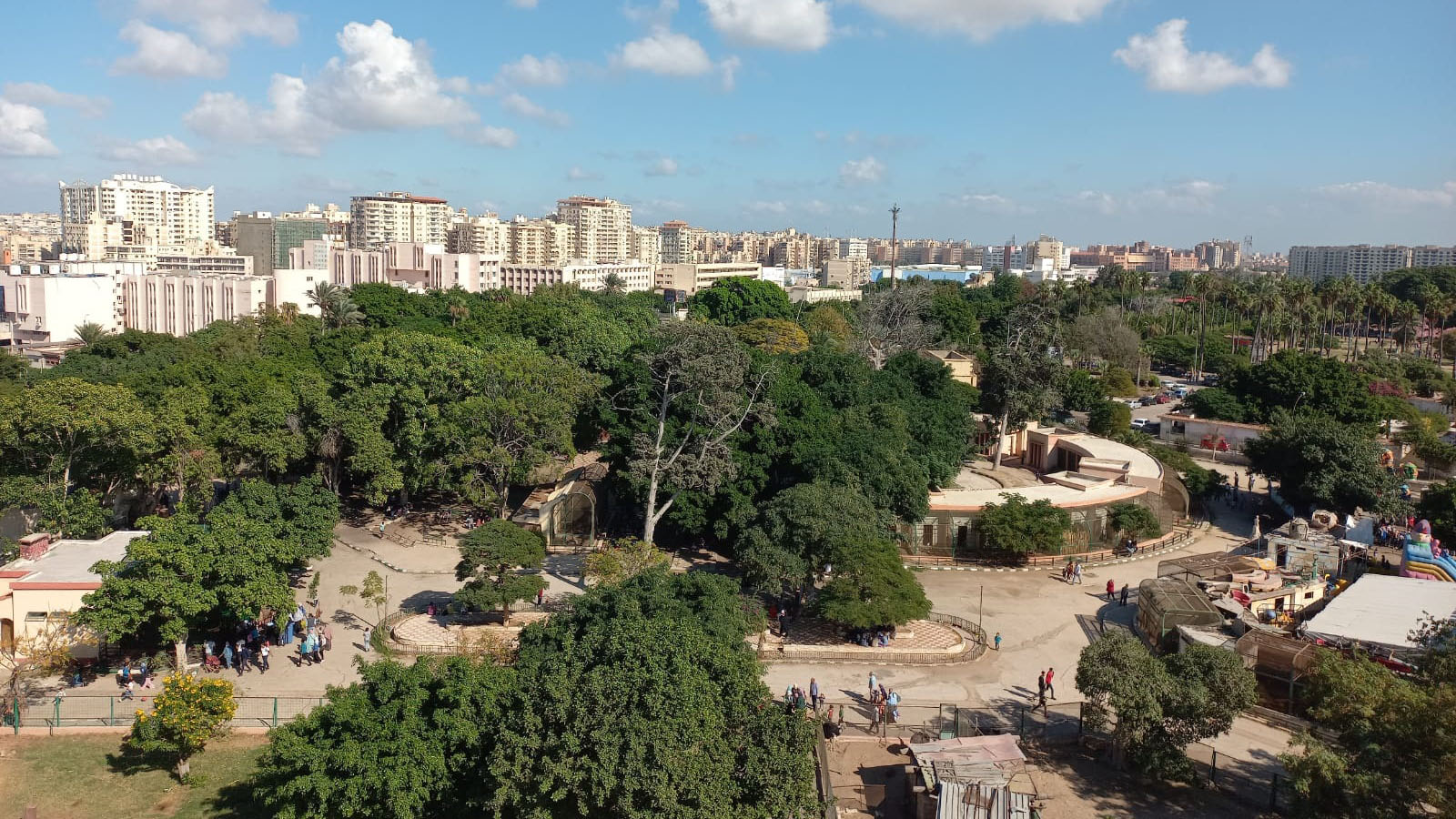
General view

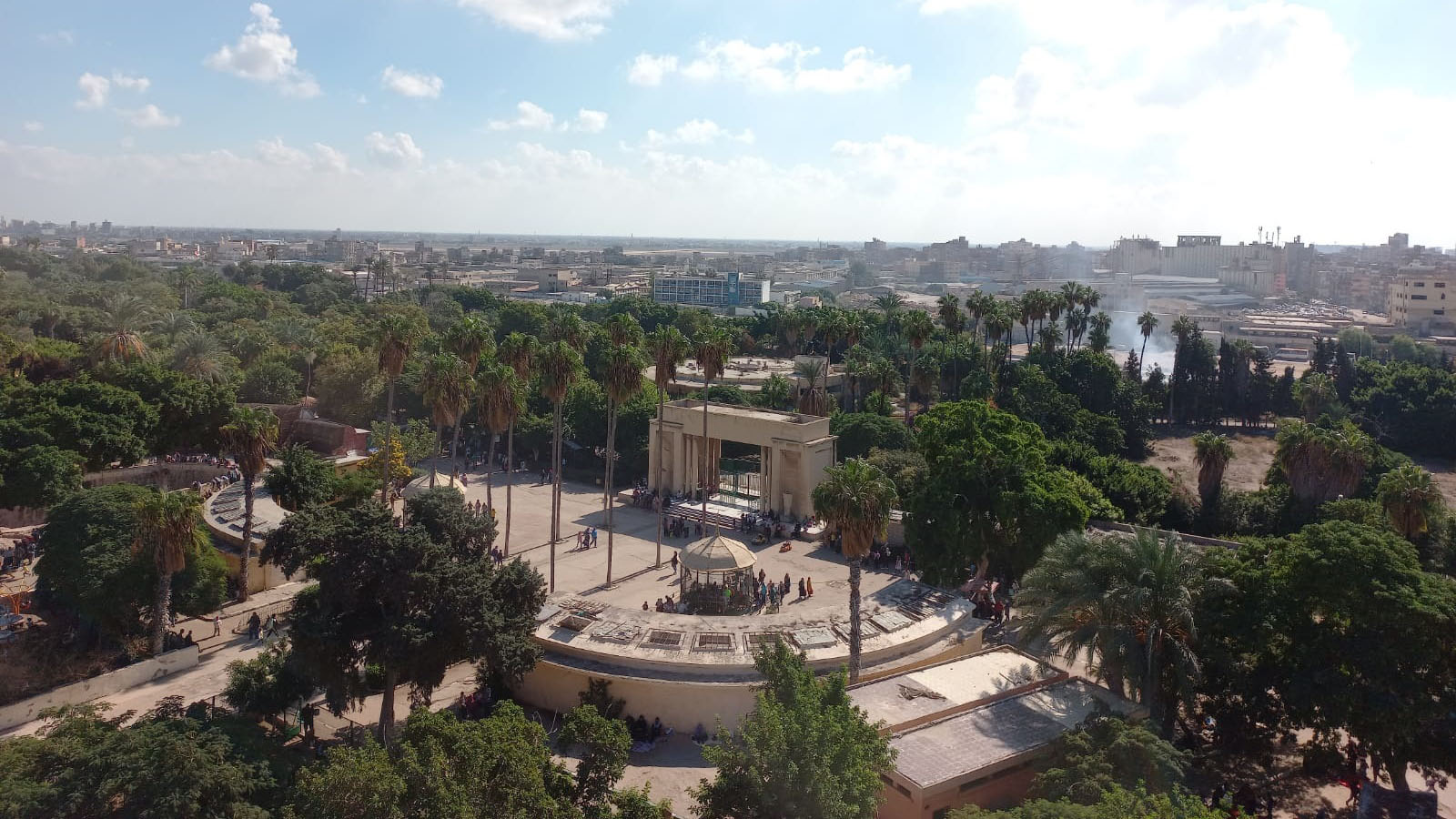
General view

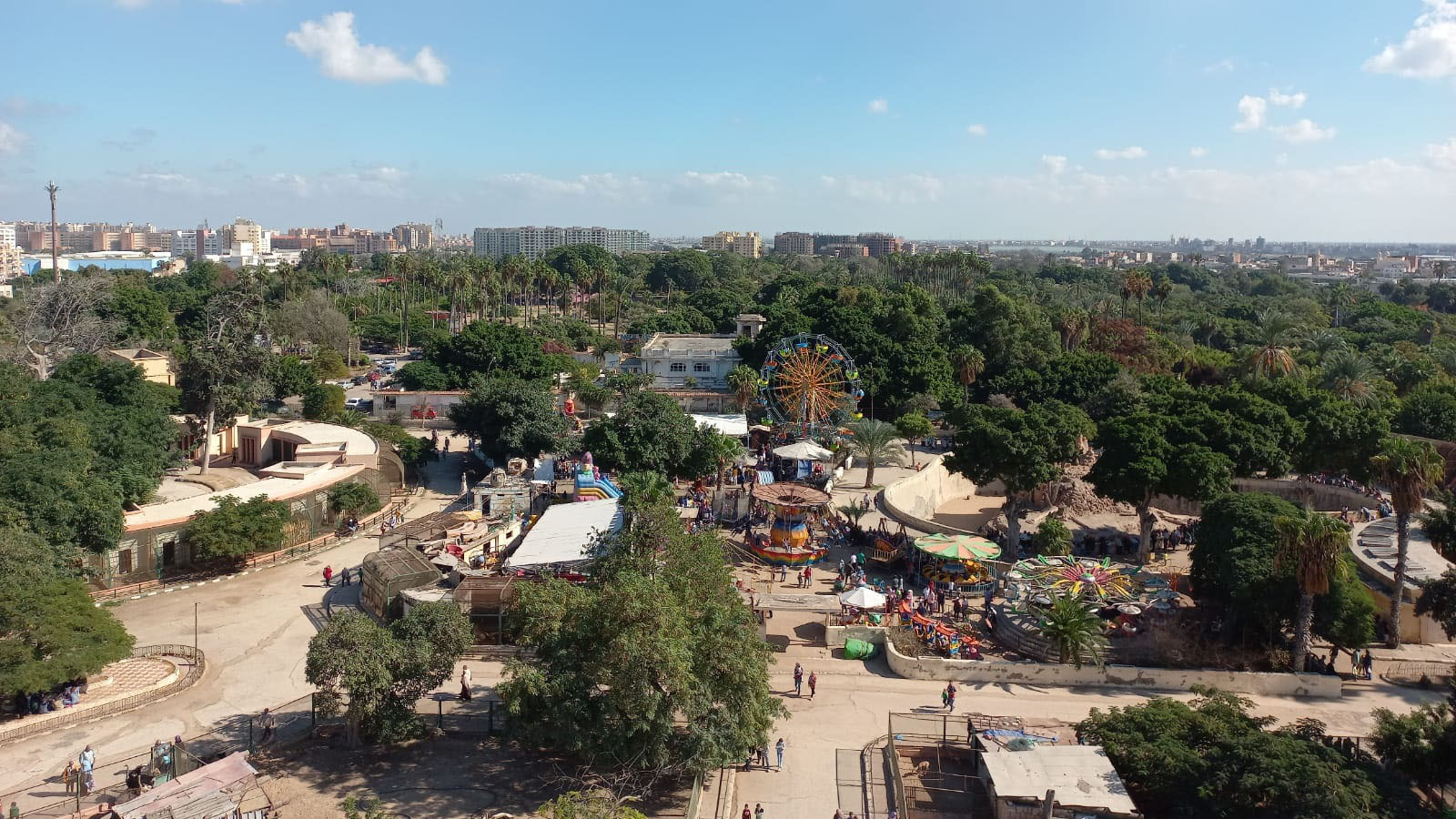
General view

== See also ==
- Giza Zoo
- Africa Safari Park
