= Feldkirchen bei Mattighofen =

- Municipality
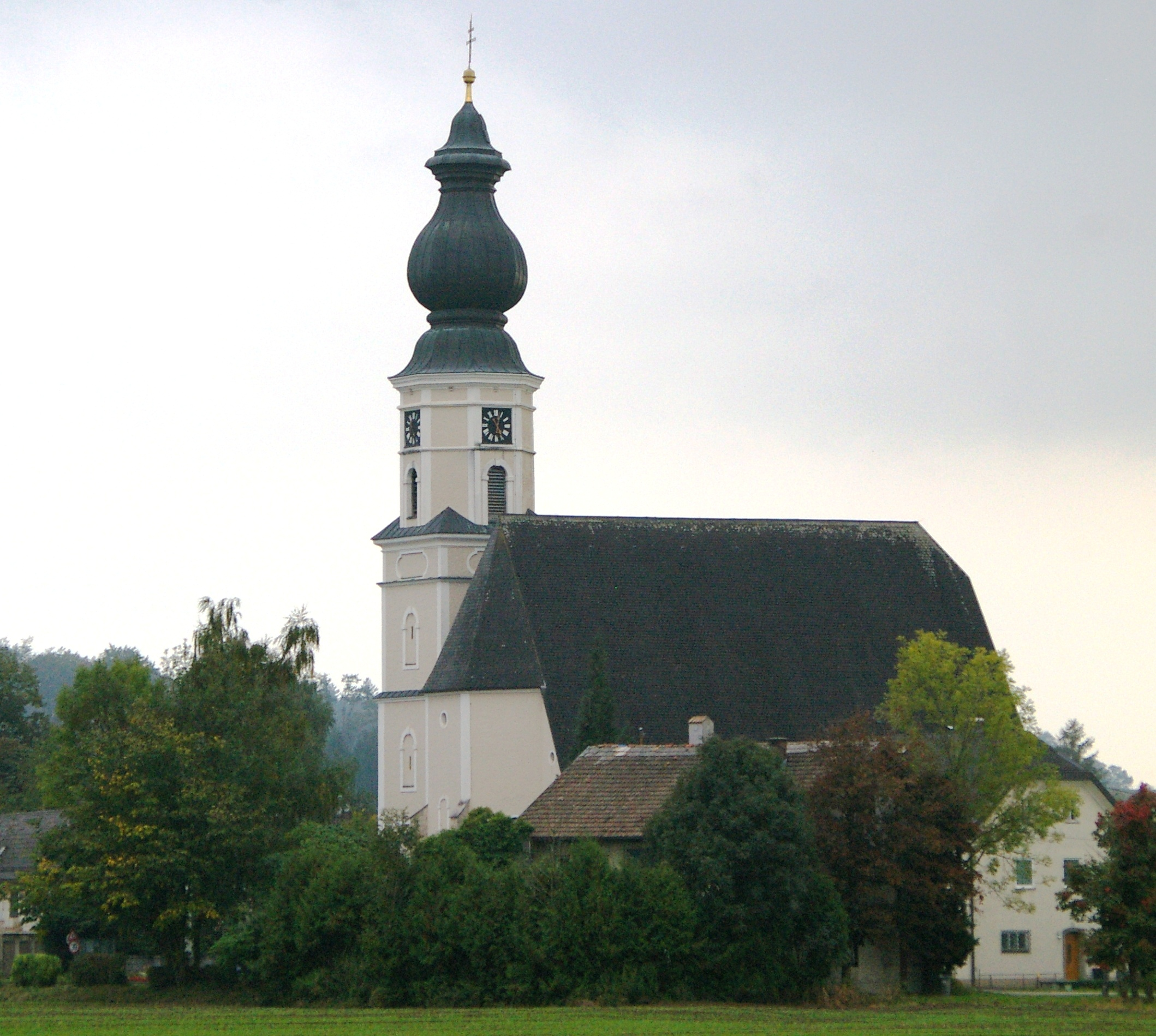
- Church of Saint Andrew

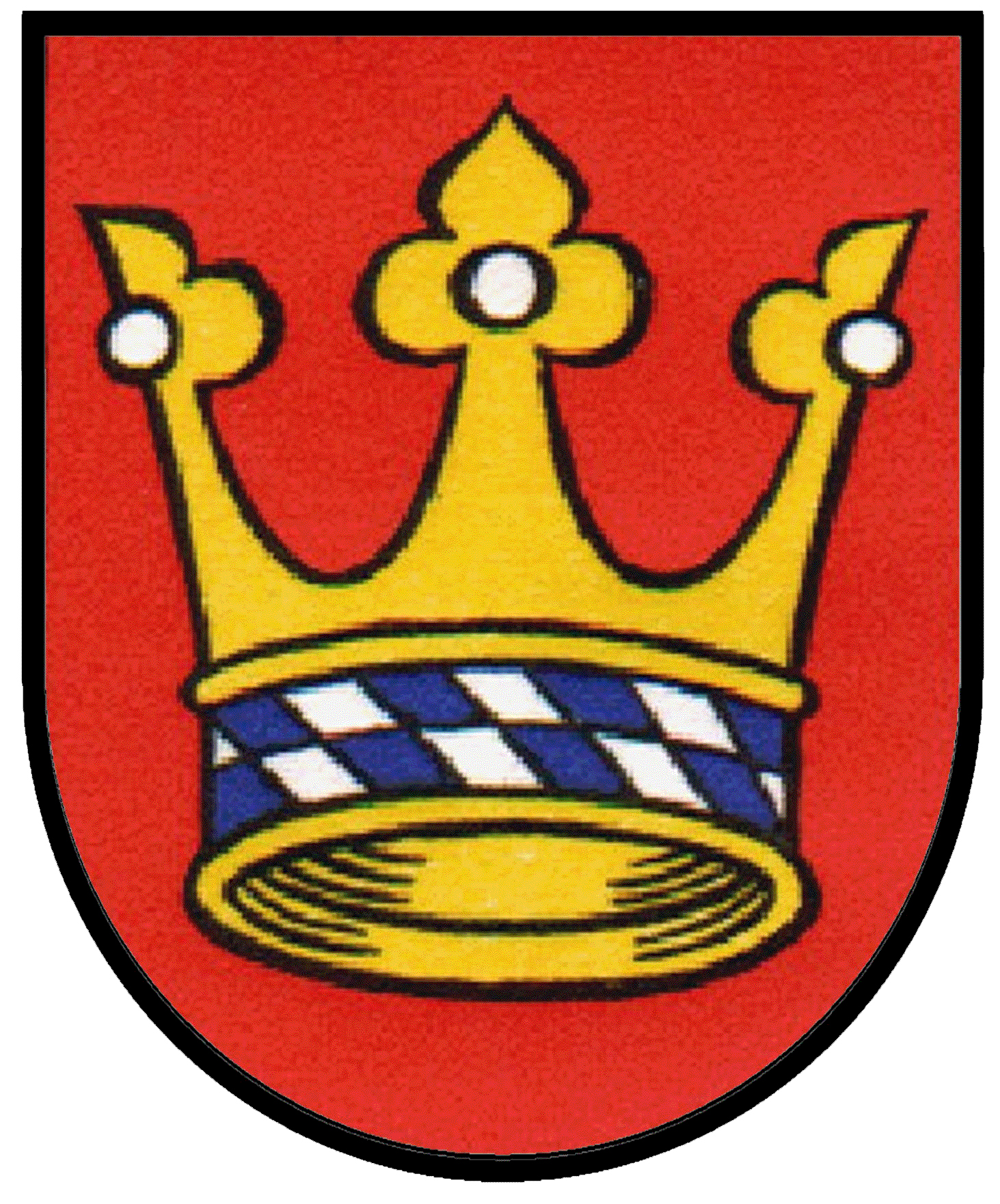
- Coat of arms

- Location within Austria
- Coordinates: 48°04′10″N 13°02′44″E
- Country: Austria
- State: Upper Austria
- District: Braunau am Inn

Government
  - Mayor: Johann Danninger (FPÖ)

Area
  - Total: 34.64 km^{2} (13.37 sq mi)
- Elevation: 509 m (1,670 ft)

Population (2018-01-01)
  - Total: 1,978
  - Density: 57.10/km^{2} (147.9/sq mi)
- Time zone: UTC+1 (CET)
  - Summer (DST): UTC+2 (CEST)
- Postal code: 5142, 5143
- Area code: 07748
- Vehicle registration: BR
- Website: www.feldkirchen-mattighofen.ooe.gv.at

Feldkirchen bei Mattighofen is a municipality in the Braunau am Inn district in the Austrian state of Upper Austria. It is home to the Berglandmilch dairy, the largest cheese dairy in Austria.

== Geography ==
The municipality has an area of 34.6 km². About 23 percent of the municipality is forest and 70 percent farmland.

== Settlements ==
- Aich
- Altheim
- Aschau
- Außerpirach
- Bamberg
- Burgkirchen
- Edt
- Emerding
- Feldkirchen bei Mattighofen
- Gerberling
- Gietzing
- Gstaig
- Hafenberg
- Haiderthal
- Hansried
- Haselpfaffing
- Hennergraben
- Holz
- Höslrein
- Innerpirach
- Jetzing
- Kampern
- Kendling
- Klöpfing
- Oichten
- Öppelhausen
- Ottenhausen
- Otterfing
- Primsing
- Quick
- Renzlhausen
- Revier Renzlhausen
- Sattlern
- Sperledt
- Vormoos
- Wenigaschau
- Wexling
- Wiesing
- Willersdorf

== Notable people ==
- Franz Wasner (1905−1992), director and conductor of the Trapp Family Singers.
