= Saint Petersburg Soviet =

1905 workers' council in Saint Petersburg

- Petersburg Soviet of Workers' Deputies
- Петербургский совет рабочих депутатов
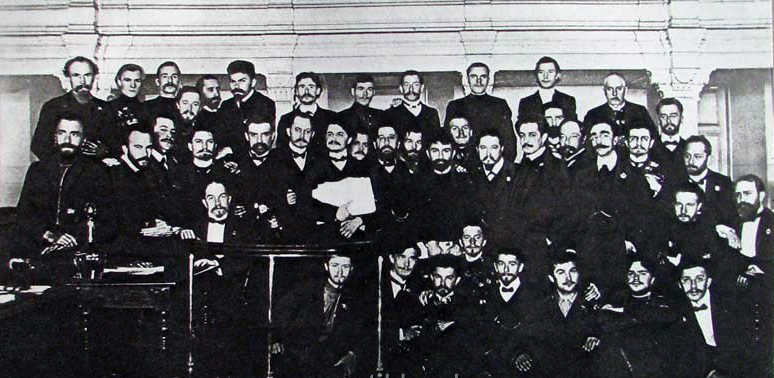
- The Soviet of Workers' Deputies of St. Petersburg in 1905: Leon Trotsky in the center.
- Predecessor: Soviet of Workers' Delegates
- Successor: Petrograd Soviet
- Formation: 26 October 1905; 121 years ago
- Founded at: Technological Institute.
- Dissolved: 16 December 1905; 120 years ago
- Type: Soviet
- Purpose: Coordination of strikes
- Members: 400–500 (1905)
- Official language: Russian

The Petersburg Soviet of Workers' Delegates (Russian: Петербургский совет рабочих депутатов, romanized: Peterburgskiy sovet rabochikh deputatov; later the Petersburg Soviet of Workers' Deputies) was a workers' council, or soviet, in Saint Petersburg in 1905.

== Origins ==
The Soviet had its origins in the aftermath of Bloody Sunday, when Nicholas II involuntarily ordered that the workers should elect delegates to present their grievances to a government commission. The idea of a soviet as an organ to coordinate workers' strike activities in Saint Petersburg arose during the January–February 1905 meetings of workers at the apartment of Volin, a member of the Socialist Revolutionary Party (later a famous anarchist). However, its activities were quickly ceased due to governmental repression.

When a general strike broke out in Saint Petersburg in October 1905, starting in the capital's printing works but soon spreading to other sectors and other parts of the Russian Empire, the striking printers decided to form a body with workers' delegates from fifty printing works. The first meeting of the Soviet, held on 26 October [O.S. 13 October] 1905, was attended only by delegates from the capital's Nevsky District. The activity of the Mensheviks succeeded in attracting delegates from other districts of the city. The body soon gained great authority over the populace, as it was the first elected organisation of the working class, hitherto without voting rights. The Soviet, which met at the Saint Petersburg State Institute of Technology, soon had delegates representing some 200,000 people. The number of delegates first grew to 400 and then to 560. A new publication, Izvestia, was also created by the Soviet. Trotsky describes the Soviet's growth between October and the end of November as follows:

The first meeting was attended by a few dozen persons; by the second half of November the number of deputies had grown to 562, including 6 women. These persons represented 147 factories and plants, 34 workshops and 16 trade unions. The main mass of the deputies – 351 persons – belonged to the metalworkers; these played the decisive role in the Soviet. There were deputies from the textile industry, 32 from the printing and paper industries, 12 from the shop-workers and from office workers and the pharmaceutical trade. The Executive Committee acted as the Soviet's ministry. It was formed on October 17 and consisted of 31 persons – 22 deputies and 9 representatives of parties (6 from the two social-democrat factions and 3 from the socialist revolutionaries).

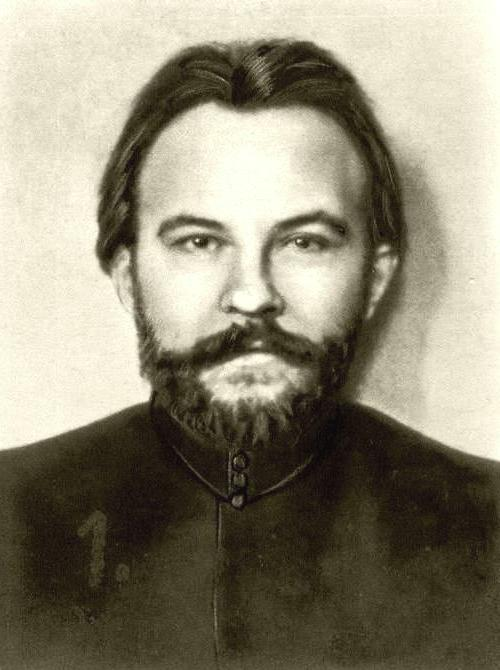
The first chairman of the Saint Petersburg Soviet Georgy Khrustalev-Nosar.

The new body was not well received by the Bolsheviks, who at first perceived it as a competitor to their political party. On the contrary, Mensheviks and Socialist Revolutionaries immediately sent representatives to the Soviet. On 30 October [O.S. 17 October] 1905, the executive presidency of the Soviet was elected: Bolsheviks, Mensheviks and Social Revolutionaries each sent three representatives. The leading Menshevik representative - despite his earlier disputes with the leaders of the current - was Leon Trotsky. On his initiative, the Bolsheviks and Mensheviks set up a federal council to coordinate their activity in the Soviet. The leading figure of the Social Revolutionaries was Nikolai Avksentiev, and all three groups cooperated smoothly in the Soviet. All three agreed to give the chairmanship to Georgy Khrustalyov-Nosar, a workers' lawyer who did not belong to any of the parties. Although he temporarily became the Soviet's figurehead, the measures were decided by the parties, mainly the Social Democratic representatives, and Trotsky in particular played a leading role. As editor of the Soviet's newspaper, Trotsky wrote most of its proclamations and motions.

== October Manifesto and revolutionary weaknesses ==
In reaction to the strike and its aftermath, Nicholas II promulgated the October Manifesto on 30 October [O.S. 17 October] 1905, promising the establishment of a constitution and the recognition of civil rights and universal suffrage. Despite the euphoria in the capital following the imperial proclamation, which led to a huge demonstration involving workers and the middle classes, those in favour of maintaining the Tsarist autocracy still retained power.

In a speech to the crowd at Saint Petersburg Imperial University, Trotsky identified the weaknesses of the revolution that ultimately caused it to fail: despite the monarch's vacillations, the power of the autocracy remained in place. Despite revolutionary ferment in some units of the Imperial Russian Army - and especially in the Imperial Russian Navy - the bulk remained loyal to the Tsar. Rural Russia, the vast majority of the country, was still indifferent to the revolution, a largely urban phenomenon. The working classes' defence of the revolution was also undecided, and some of them were content with the tsar's concessions. While they longed for political freedoms, the proletariat also sought social reforms.

== Activities of the Soviet ==
On 3 November [O.S. 21 October] 1905, the strike from which the Soviet had emerged came to an end; the motion calling for an end to the strikes had been submitted by Trotsky two days earlier. While the Assistant Minister of Internal Affairs, Dmitri Trepov, was preparing the Special Corps of Gendarmes to disperse the rally at the funeral of the strike victims announced for two days later, and the secret police were organising a pogrom, Trotsky advocated the cancellation of the march. The Soviet agreed to cancel the demonstration. Although frustrated by the need to avoid an armed clash with the authorities, the Soviet immediately ordered the formation of armed squads, whose first mission was to prevent the planned pogrom.

The Soviet encouraged the printing workers to oppose, with success, the maintenance of censorship - which contradicted the October promises to introduce freedom of the press - and to demand the eight-hour working day, which some workers succeeded in introducing on their own, with the backing of the Soviet. On 14 November [O.S. 1 November] 1905, he held a solemn reception for the Polish delegation - consisting mainly of aristocrats and priests - which came to him to protest the proclamation of the state of siege in Congress Poland. The Soviet called for a general strike in solidarity with Poland and to protest the government's announcement that the Kronstadt sailors who had taken part in the October strike would be tried in military courts. This second strike, however, had to end on 18 November [O.S. 5 November] 1905, due to the exhaustion of part of the population; by then the government had partially relented and allowed the civilian trial of the sailors.

A few days later, and in the face of the Russian employers, who reacted to the forced introduction of the eight-hour day with factory closures that left 100,000 workers on the street, the Soviet had to give in again and abandon this demand. Despite the revolutionary impulse of part of the population, the Soviet was weak.

== Crisis and suppression ==
The government succeeded in crushing attempts at military rebellion in some units. It also succeeded in restoring censorship of the press despite the protests of the Soviet. On 5 December [O.S. 22 November] 1905, the authorities arrested the chairman of the Soviet and some of its leaders. The Socialist Revolutionaries expressed the need to react by attacking Tsarist ministers, while others preferred to call a new general strike. Trotsky then proposed to elect a new chairmanship and to continue preparations for an uprising against the government. A collegial chairmanship, including Trotsky himself, was subsequently elected. Preparations for the insurrection, however, were minimal, and the government took it upon itself to hinder them. Shortly afterwards, it sent an armed force to guard the building of the Free Economic Society, the new seat of the Soviet.

Unable to organise an armed uprising, the soviet opted for a financial boycott of the government and asked the population to stop paying taxes and demand payment in gold. The request precipitated the expected confrontation with the authorities. On the evening of 16 December [O.S. 3 December] 1905, while the executive council was discussing the government's latest repressive measures - permission to provincial governors to proclaim a state of siege, censorship of the press which had published the petition for a boycott of the Soviet, plans to ban socialist parties, etc. - news of the imminent government assault arrived: the building was already surrounded. The Soviet decided to put up no resistance and continued to meet. After the police officer in charge of announcing the arrest order was admonished by Trotsky and left the meeting, those present were eventually arrested. The Soviet had survived for fifty days before its forced dissolution.

== See also ==
- Bibliography of the Russian Revolution and Civil War
- Outline of the Russian Revolution and Civil War
- Index of articles related to the Russian Revolution and Civil War
