= August von Eisenhart =

Bavarian lawyer and politician

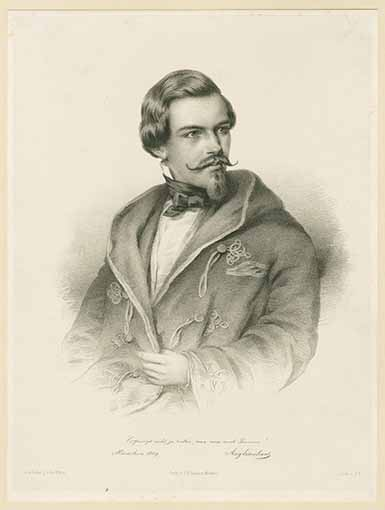
- A. Eisenhart
- Born: Johann August Eisenhart; 3 November 1826; Munich, Bavaria
- Died: 21 December 1905 (aged 79); Munich, Bavaria, Germany
- Education: Ludwig-Maximilians-Universität München; Heidelberg University
- Occupations: Justice service official Judge; Cabinet Secretary to The King; Biographer
- Spouse(s): Luise von Kobell (1827-1901) author & commentator
- Children: 1. Helene; 2. Heinrich
- Parents: Ignaz Eisenhart (1790–1864) (father); Elise Weininger (1800–1882) (mother)

August von Eisenhart (3 November 1826 – 21 December 1905) was a Bavarian lawyer who became a politician. Between 1870 and 1876 he served as the king's cabinet secretary. The appointment was almost certainly made at the instigation of the powerful Interior Minister Johann von Lutz. The king himself became (at best) increasingly reclusive during the 1870s: commentators indicate that von Eisenhart became, in effect, the sole intermediary between King Ludwig II and the outside world - which included the other members of the Bavarian government.

== Early life and education ==
Johann August Eisenhart was born in Munich, where Ignaz Eisenhart (1790–1864), his father, worked as a senior appeal court judge. Both his parents had come originally from Württemberg. He studied Jurisprudence, first at the Ludwig-Maximilians-Universität München and then at Heidelberg University. While a student he formed what would become a lifelong friendship with the writer Joseph Victor von Scheffel. His studies completed, he joined the Bavarian Justice Service.

== Career ==
The work started with an internship, during which he lived in Munich with his parents at the family home in the "Karlstraße". Diagonally across the street was the home of the Kobells, members of a well-established dynasty of intellectuals and artists. August Eisenhart and Luise von Kobell (1827 - 1901) had already known one another for a long time when, finally, on 14 September 1857, they married. The ceremony took place not in the city but in the little town of Miesbach, in the Alpine foothills some 50 km to the south. Bride and groom both came from prominent families, and were united in their determination that their wedding ceremony should be a low-key affair. Directly following the service they headed further south "into the mountains" for their honeymoon. By this time Eisenhart was well established in his career. Promotion followed the marriage when, at the end of 1857, he was appointed to a junior judicial role as an "assessor" at the Munich district court. Further promotion followed in 1859 when he was appointed to the same position at the Upper Appeal Court in Freising. When the Upper Appeal Court was transferred to Munich in 1862, Eisenhart moved back with it, by now a judge of the appeal court. For the rest of the 1860s his career continued to progress along its upward trajectory.

At the start of 1870, August Eisenhart was plucked from the relative obscurity of the Bavarian Justice System and appointed cabinet secretary to the king. The appointment was almost certainly made at the instigation of Johann von Lutz, head of the Bavarian government. The king was becoming ever more reluctant to see people, and often stayed away from the capital for months on end, preferring the seclusion afforded by his growing collection of opulent remotely located "modern castles". That left the running of Bavaria in the hands of the government. Von Eisenhart became the only link between the king and the government. It was potentially a highly influential position, especially since the dutiful sober minded official had little natural sympathy with the king's fantastical visions and opinions. Von Eisenhart's own politics seem to have combined powerful monarchist instincts with a lawyerly respect for the institutions of state and an enthusiasm the enlightenment thinking which had become mainstream among intellectuals across Western Europe in the aftermath of the French Revolution. But sources insist that von Eisenhart's natural timidity and strong sense of duty meant that he never exploited his position for personal gain, nor indeed to promote any political vision of his own. His principal challenges seem to have been those involved in "managing the king" who could be powerfully resistant to following the advice coming from his ministers in Munich. Through the critical unification process of 1870, choreographed from Berlin by Chancellor Bismarck, the Bavarian king needed particularly careful handling. In the end the treaty of 23 November 1870 whereby the Kingdom of Bavaria entered into an "eternal union" with the North German Confederation was ratified by the king, according to one source, only "through the energetic advice" ("...das energische Zuraten...") of Cabinet Secretary von Eisenhart. Other sources insist that, following the shock of defeat in 1866, Ludwig's consent was based on having reached for himself the pragmatic conclusion that Bavaria had no choice but to support the union of a "small German" state - excluding Austria and / or that large and at this stage secret cash payment arranged by Bismarck played their part. Von Eisenhart saw it as an important part of his duty to conceal from the Bavarian public he extent to which the head of state was absenting himself from his royal duties, and to ensure that the duties involved were nevertheless seen to be properly carried out. It was no easy task, and in the end his health suffered. Early in 1876 he applied to the king for a transfer, which the increasingly irascible king refused. A couple of months later, however, the king changed his mind, and on 12 May 1876 it was the king himself signed the letter of discharge suspending von Eisenhart from his duties. Some sources see von Eisenhart's abrupt change of career as gratuitously undignified, but it seems to have led to an outcome that suited both parties. Von Eisenhart accepted an appointment in a less exposed area of government service as a "Staatsrat im Ministerialdienst" (loosely, "Ministerial Counsellor of State"), a post he filled till his retirement, enjoying the opportunity to spend more time with family and friends and devote time to the music which he loved. He lived on for almost a further three decades after 1876, so presumably his health recovered.

== Death ==
By the time of his death he had also authored 240 biographical essays for the Allgemeine Deutsche Biographie (German Biographical Dictionary).

August von Eisnenhart died in Munich on 21 December 1905, a few weeks after his seventy-ninth birthday.

== Personal ==
August Eisenhart's marriage to the author Luise von Kobell was followed in due course by the births of the couple's two children, Helene and Heinrich.

== Recognition ==
In 1871, following his appointment to the service of the king the previous year, Eisenhart was awarded the Knight's Cross of the Bavarian Crown. That made him a member of the Bavarian nobility. "Eisenhart" became "von Eisenhart", at least within Bavaria (which by this time was a subservient element within the German empire). In 1886, which was the year of his sixtieth birthday, he received a further honour, created a "Commander of the Order of the Bavarian Crown"
