= Georgy Stepanovich Khrustalev-Nosar =

Russian revolutionary (1877–1919)

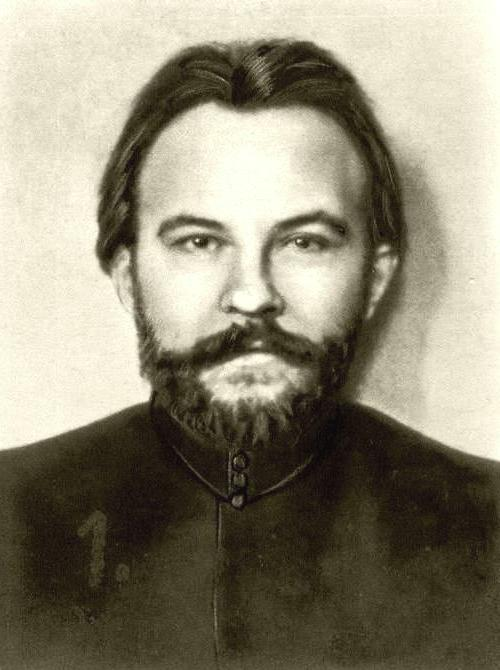

Georgy Stepanovich Nosar (aka Pyotr Alekseevich Khrustalev, pseudonym: Yuri Pereyaslavsky, 1877, Pereyaslav – 1919, ibid.) was a political and public figure, and assistant barrister from the Russian Empire. From October to November 1905, he was the first chairman of the St. Petersburg Council of Workers' Deputies. He was born in Pereyaslav, then in the Russian Empire. Nosar supported the February Revolution but opposed the October Revolution. He worked with the Ukrainian Hetmanate during the Civil War and after being captured by Red Army soldiers, was executed for counter-revolutionary activity.
