= TK Ramanuja Kavirajar =

Tamil poet, playwright, lawyer and humanitarian

'Kavithendral' T.K. Ramanuja Kavirajar B.A., B.L. (1905–1985) was a Tamil poet, Gandhian, playwright, lawyer and humanitarian.

This Indian writer had mastery in both English and Tamil. He wrote 14 books in Tamil and five in English. He is known for his voluminous creations, chaste language and poetic skills.

He followed the principles of Mahatma Gandhi to the word and practised truthfulness. Even though he has written many books, his magnum opus is considered to be 'Mahatma Gandhi Kaaviyam', an epic on the life of Mahatma Gandhi penned in 12285 verses. This massive creation along with his other devotional works earned him the 'Kavithendral' award from the Nammakkal Kavingar award Committee.

Kavirajar, as he is fondly called, went on to translate this work in English as "Bharath reborn".

He led a simple and pious life and died at the age of 80.

== Early life ==
T.K. Ramanuja Kavirajar was born in Tirunelveli on 28 December 1905 to Kallapiran and Arasalwar. He started writing poems when he was around twelve years of age. He took to literature as fish to water and was proficient in both English and Tamil. It has been noted that he was capable of writing commentaries on the works of Shakespeare, at around the same time. His mother died early and he was adopted by his maternal uncle.

== Family life ==
Kavirajar married Chellamal when he was very young. He was blessed with five children. His wife died quite early and he married Visalakshi after a couple of years. The poet was tested again as this lady and two of his daughters died soon. He then spent most of his life in performing his duties in a saint-like manner and producing literary works that embodied high values, philosophy and truth.

== Mahatma Gandhi Kaaviyam ==
In the years between 1975 and 1979, Kavirajar released his Master piece, 'Mahatma Gandhi Kaaviyam', an epic in Tamil, in four volumes. This work, which is hailed by purists, was modelled after poet Kamban's Ramayanam. Kavirajar received many glaring reviews for this work from all major Indian magazines and newspapers. Forums, competitions and literary reviews on this work are being conducted to the day.

== Other creations ==
In the years that followed he wrote many books in English. In 1979 he released a collection of poems on various headings titled 'Lyrics of life' and a play called 'Mudin'. In the next year he translated his epic into English calling it 'Bharath reborn or The story of Mahatma Gandhi'.

The versatile Kavirajar followed these up with 'Mathematics and man', 'A Treatise on Hinduism' and 'Kambaramayanam in English verse'.

In 1989 he went back to his life theme by writing 'M.K. Gandhi (English Drama)

In addition to the above he wrote many books, both prose and poetry, in Tamil on various categories.

== Humanitarian works ==
This poet, despite his riches, led a simple life. He donated 100 acres (0.40 km^{2}) of land to Acharya Vinoba Bhave's Bhoodan movement. He built a maternal child health care home in his village. He patronised education and helped deserving students all his life. This true Gandhian died in 1985.
