= Franz Wasner =

Austrian priest and conductor (1905–1992)

The Reverend Franz Wasner
- Born: December 28, 1905; Feldkirchen, Austria
- Died: June 21, 1992 (aged 86); Salzburg, Austria
- Occupations: priest, missionary, music director

Franz Mathias Wasner (December 28, 1905 – June 21, 1992) was an Austrian Catholic priest, the director and conductor of the Trapp Family Singers and a missionary. In the quasi-fictionalized stage and screen musical The Sound of Music, he is represented by the character Max Detweiler.

== Biography ==
Wasner was born on December 28, 1905, in Feldkirchen near Mattighofen, a small town in Upper Austria. After graduating from the University of Innsbruck, he was ordained a priest and served in the small rural community of Mayrhofen in Tyrol for one year. He then studied canon law in Rome and graduated in 1934.

Wasner later moved to Salzburg, where he met Georg von Trapp. He and Trapp became close friends, and from that time on he accompanied the Trapp family as director and conductor on all their concert tours. He also composed several Masses and more than 60 songs to texts by various poets such as Ingeborg Bachmann, Christian Morgenstern, and Georg Trakl.

In 1958, Wasner decided to do missionary work on the Fiji Islands, where he remained until 1966. During his stay, he commissioned murals in the small church of his station in Naiserelangi by the French artist Jean Charlot.

The Vatican appointed Wasner in 1967 rector of the Pontifical Institute Santa Maria dell' Anima in Rome, which he headed until 1981.

Wasner died on June 21, 1992, in Salzburg and was buried in the PetersFriedhof.
