= Michael John Nicoll =

English ornithologist and zoo director

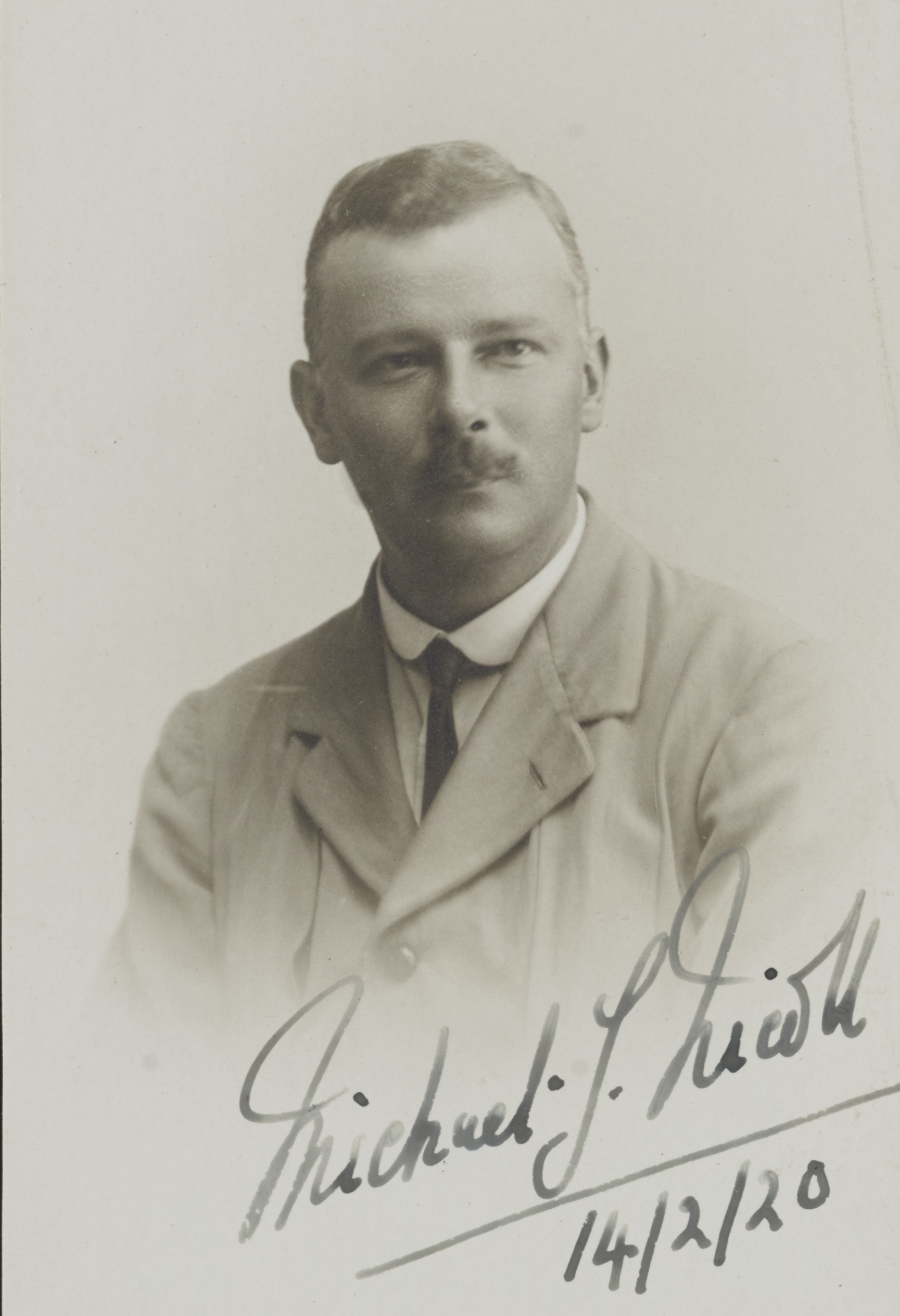
Portrait, 1920

Michael John Nicoll (29 September 1880, in Bepton – 31 October 1925, in Leeds) was an English ornithologist and zoo director at Giza who worked on the birds of Egypt. He accompanied Lord Crawford on several voyages to explore bird life and wrote a book on his experiences. He also published one of the earliest comprehensive works on the birds of Egypt - the Handlist of the Birds of Egypt.

== Biography ==
Nicoll born to Reverend C.A. Nicoll in Bepton, Sussex. He grew up at St Leonard's-on-Sea studying at the local school and moved to a farm in Brightling where he took an interest in the natural world. He began to observe, shoot, skin and preserve birds in Sussex. He was a friend of Thomas Parkin and was later helped by P.L. Sclater who elected him in 1902 to the membership of the British Ornithologists' Union. He travelled on an expedition with Lord Crawford aboard the latter's yacht Valhalla. He wrote a book on this in 1908 - Three Voyages of a Naturalist. In 1906 he moved to Egypt to work at the Giza zoological gardens as an assistant to Captain S.S. Flower. He studied the ornithology of Egypt and wrote a book on the subject in 1919. In 1923, Nicoll replaced Major Flower as director of the Giza zoo but an illness forced him to retire in the next year. He settled at Wittersham in Kent. He married Norris Lyon in 1912 after whom he named an Egyptian warbler Sylvia norrisae (now considered as a subspecies of the Sardinian warbler). Although Nicoll was noted as a careful observer it has been found that 31 of the specimens in the Hastings Rarities case came from him. Some specimens were even found to have been prepared in a style more likely followed in Egypt than in England and that some of the rarities claimed to have been shot in England may have come from him.
