= Ketani Association =

Austrian society for Romani people

The Ketani Association (German: Verein Ketani) is an Austrian association for Romani and Sinti. It was founded in 1998 by Gitta Martl and her brother Albert Kugler in Linz, Austria.

== History ==
Many Romani people and Sinti did not possess any documents after World War II. As they were not able to read nor to write, it was difficult for them to solve these bureaucratic issues alone by visiting the responsible offices. The Ketani Association represented these interests for this minority living in Austria over centuries. One of the associations’ tasks was to support and to look after its members by helping out with applications, search of accommodation or education. Furthermore, the Ketani Association looks after Romani refugees, mostly coming from the former Yugoslavia, who suffer from postwar-consequences. It represents the interests of Sinti and Romani people in public through interviews, radio broadcasts, television recordings, writing articles about specific topics i.e. the fate of Romani women in Upper Austria. Another field of tasks is taking care of camping places in the surrounding and especially consultation and conception of surrounding campsites for Sinti and Romani people, i.e. at Braunau in cooperation with mayor Gerhard Skiba. In 2006 the association produced the movie Ketani heißt miteinander. Sintiwirklichkeiten statt Zigeunerklischees von Ludwig Laher. Besides many cultural project which take place annually, the members of the association give lectures about Sinti and Romani people in Austria and report from own experiences of being part of the minority. An important point is the organization and participation at commemoration events for victims of the National Socialist Regime, for example Maxglan, Mauthausen and Lackenbach. In 2005 the soccer team “Ketani Kickers” was founded. The Ketani Association design a radio broadcast monthly on Radio FRO in Linz. In these broadcasts interesting personalities are introduced, Romani and Sinti music is played and they talk about current happenings and projects of Ketani Association. In the last broadcast under the moderator Josef Gaffl, Gitta Martl and her daughter Nicole read from the book: “We should not have existed”. The book was published at “Geschichte der Heimat; Franz Steinmassl”. It is the very first book about the history of Sinti published in Austria. In 2008 the book was translated in Japanese by Martin Kaneko.
