= Stolpersteine in the district of Braunau am Inn =

The Stolpersteine in the district of Braunau am Inn are small, cobble stone-sized memorials to the former residents of the district who perished at the hands of the Nazis during the Third Reich. Conceived and installed by Cologne artist Gunter Demnig, they were set in the pavement at various locations between August 11–12, 2006.

== First 11 memorials laid ==
Demnig has laid over 20,000 Stolpersteine since 1996. The 11 Stolpersteine in the district Braunau am Inn are in eight different municipalities. The former Heimatgau des Führers (Adolf Hitler's birthplace) was the first area to receive its Stolpersteine. They're installed in front of the former residences of people who were persecuted for different reasons.

The 11 Stolpersteine memorialize the Jehovah's Witness Anna Sax (from Braunau am Inn), the four Communists and the Socialist Franz Amberger, Adolf Wenger (both from Braunau am Inn), Johann Lenz and Josef Weber (both from Hackenbuch/Moosdorf), of Franz Jägerstätter (from Sankt Radegund), who refused his conscription orders, of father Ludwig S. Binder (Maria Schmolln), the Sinto Johann Kerndlbacher (of Hochburg–Ach), the victims of the Nazi military legal system and of Michael Nimmerfahl (from Braunau am Inn), who was killed while under Gestapo detention. The Stolpersteine were laid in the presence of local politicians, the media and local residents. The Stolpersteine project has led to a new interest in the forgotten victims.

== History ==
The cultural initiative KNIE invited Demnig in 1997 to Oberndorf near Salzburg. After the Stolpersteine for Jehovah's Witnesses Matthias and Johann Nobis were accidentally destroyed, the political scientist Andreas Maislinger, who is from the area, invited Demnig to renovate the destroyed memorials and install more in the adjacent district of Braunau am Inn.

== See also ==
- Austrian Holocaust Memorial Service
- Hitler birthplace memorial stone
- List of cities by country that have Stolpersteine

== Sources ==
- Ludwig Laher, Herzfleischentartung, novel. Haymon Verlag, Innsbruck (2003) (in German)
- Florian Schwanninger, Im Heimatkreis des Führers. Nationalsozialismus, Widerstand und Verfolgung im Bezirk Braunau am Inn 1938 - 1945. Edition Geschichte der Heimat, Grünbach (Upper Austria) (2005) ISBN 3-902427-18-3. (in German)
