= Gerald Lehner =

Gerald Lehner may refer to:

- Gerald Lehner (referee) (1968–2016), Austrian football referee
- Gerald Lehner (journalist) (born 1963), Austrian journalist and author
