= Herrem =

Herrem is a surname. Notable people with the surname include:

- Camilla Herrem (born 1986), Norwegian handball player
- Geir André Herrem (born 1988), Norwegian footballer

== See also ==
- Herren
