= Gerhard Skiba =

Austrian politician (1947–2019)

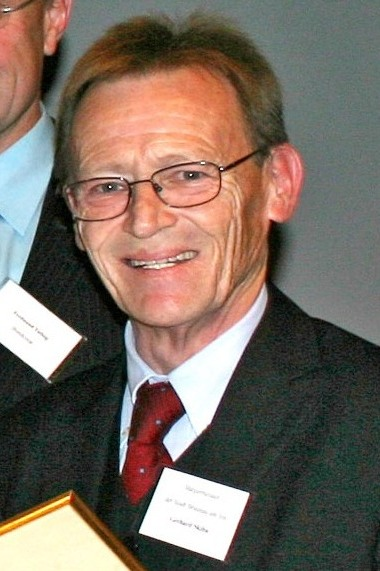
Skiba presents the Egon Ranshofen-Wertheimer Award in 2007

Gerhard Skiba (1947 – 15 March 2019) was an Austrian politician of the Austrian Social Democratic Party elected mayor of the city of Braunau am Inn in 1989. He became internationally known after setting up a memorial stone for the victims of Fascism in front of the house where Adolf Hitler was born.

== Early life ==
In 1992, representatives from Bautzen, Mauthausen, Wunsiedel and other towns with an “unwelcome heritage” followed his invitation for the 1st Braunau Contemporary History Days. "Old city": 750 years Braunau am Inn was the title of the 19th Contemporary History Days in September 2010.

On 11 August 2000, Skiba invited Gunter Demnig, an artist from Cologne to lay four Stolpersteine for victims of the National Socialism in Braunau am Inn.

Gerhard Skiba was awarded the Elfriede Grünberg Prize in 2007 to honor his merits to struggle National Socialism. The award is named after Holocaust-Victim Elfriede Grünberg. In 2006 also Leopold Engleitner (104), the oldest survivor of the concentration camps Buchenwald, Niederhagen and Ravensbrück, received the Elfriede Grünberg Prize.

In 2007, he presented the Trapp Family with the Egon Ranshofen-Wertheimer Award, which was founded in order to honor Austrians who stood up for and represented Austria in an extraordinary way abroad.

On 23 September 2010, Skiba resigned for health reasons.
