= Maria von Trapp =

Matriarch of the Trapp Family Singers (1905–1987)

Maria von Trapp DHS
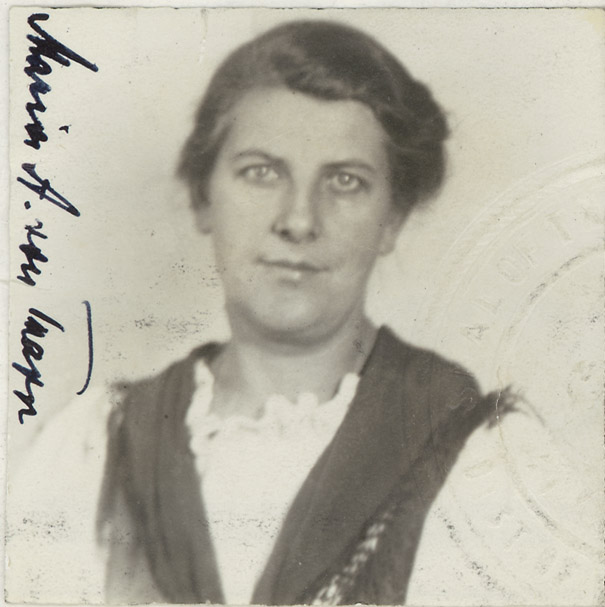
- Maria von Trapp in 1948
- Born: Maria Augusta Kuczera; 26 January 1905; Vienna, Austria-Hungary
- Died: 28 March 1987 (aged 82); Morrisville, Vermont, U.S.
- Resting place: Trapp Family Cemetery, Trapp Family Lodge, Stowe, Vermont, U.S.
- Spouse: Georg Ritter von Trapp (m. 1927; died 1947)
- Children: 3, including Johannes von Trapp, plus 7 stepchildren

Maria Augusta von Trapp DHS (née Kutschera; 26 January 1905 – 28 March 1987), often styled as "Baroness", was the stepmother and matriarch of the Trapp Family. She wrote the memoir The Story of the Trapp Family Singers, which was published in 1949 and was the inspiration for the 1956 West German film The Trapp Family, which in turn inspired the 1959 Broadway musical The Sound of Music and its 1965 film version.

== Biography ==
=== Early life ===
Kutschera was purportedly born on 26 January 1905 to Karl and Augusta Kuczera. She says she was delivered on a train on the night of 25 January, during her mother's return from her homeland of Tyrol to their family residence in Vienna, Austria. Kutschera was baptized into the Catholic Church on 29 January within the Alservorstadt parish and maternity hospital.

Her father was a hotel commissionaire, born in Vienna, the son of Josef Kučera from a Moravian village, Vídeň. Karl was first married in Graz to Klara Rainer in 1887. The couple had a son named Karl in 1888 before Klara's death a few months later. Maria's father remained a widower until he remarried to Klara's younger sister, Augusta, in 1903. Augusta died of pulmonary tuberculosis when Maria was nearly 10 months old. Maria's grief-stricken father left her with his cousin in Kagran, who also fostered Maria's half-brother Karl after his mother had died. Maria's father then traveled the world, although Maria would visit him upon occasion at his apartment in Vienna. He changed the spelling of their surname to Kutschera in 1914, dying at home later that year. Maria's foster mother's son-in-law, Uncle Franz, then became her guardian.

Uncle Franz mistreated Kutschera and punished her for things she did not do; he was later found to be mentally ill. This changed Kutschera from a shy child into the teenage "class cut-up", figuring she may as well have fun if she were going to get in trouble either way. Despite this change, Kutschera continued to get good grades.

After graduating from high school at 15, Kutschera ran away to stay with a friend, with the intent to become a tutor for children staying at nearby hotels. Because she looked so young, no one took Kutschera seriously. Finally, a hotel manager asked her to be umpire for a tennis tournament. Although Kutschera did not know what an umpire was and had never played tennis, she took the job. From this occupation, Kutschera saved enough money to enter the State Teachers College for Progressive Education in Vienna, where she also received a scholarship. Kutschera graduated at age 18 in 1923.

In 1924, Kutschera entered Nonnberg Abbey, a Benedictine monastery in Salzburg as a postulant. While living at the Abbey in 1926, she was asked to leave the abbey temporarily and to teach Maria Franziska von Trapp, one of seven children born to widowed naval commander Georg von Trapp. His first wife, the Anglo-Austrian heiress Agathe Whitehead, had earlier died in 1922 from scarlet fever. Eventually, Maria began to look after the other children: Rupert, Agathe, Werner, Hedwig, Johanna, and Martina.

=== Marriage ===
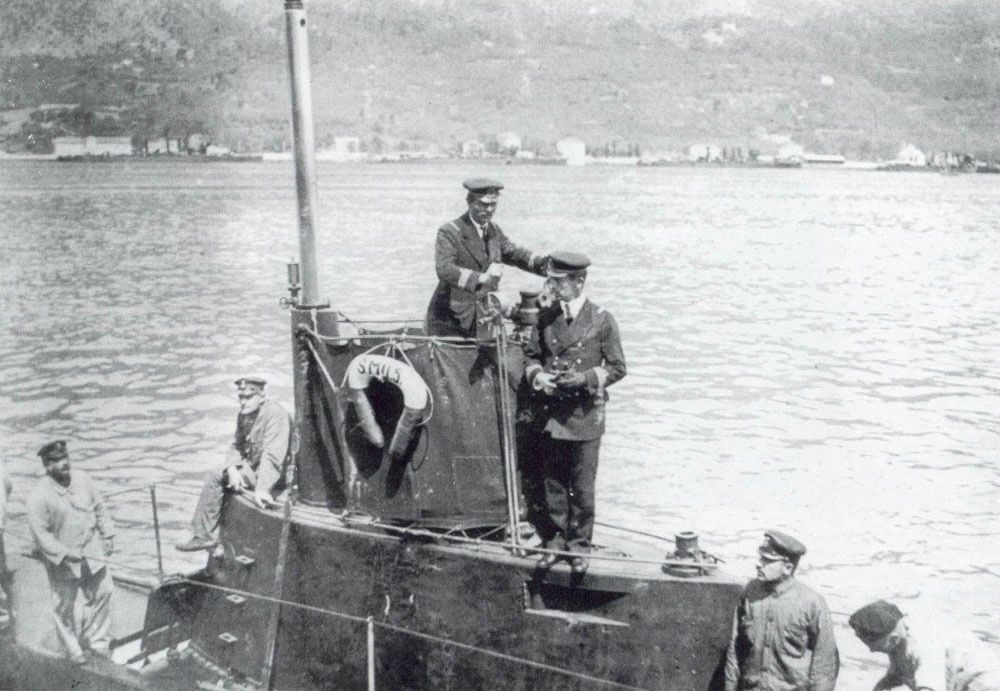
Georg von Trapp on the bridge of submarine U-5 of the Austro-Hungarian Navy (1915)

Captain von Trapp saw how much Kutschera cared about his children and asked her to marry him, although he was 25 years her senior. Frightened, Kutschera fled back to Nonnberg Abbey to seek guidance from the abbess, Virgilia Lütz, who advised her it was God's will that Kutschera should marry him. She then returned to the family and accepted his proposal. In her autobiography, Kutschera wrote that she was very angry on her wedding day, both at God and at her new husband, because she really wanted to be a nun: "I really and truly was not in love. I liked him but didn't love him. However, I loved the children, so in a way I really married the children. I learned to love him more than I have ever loved before or after." They married at Nonnberg Abbey on 26 November 1927 and had three children together: Rosmarie (1929–2022), Eleonore "Lorli" (1931–2021), and Johannes (born 1939).

=== Medical problems ===
The von Trapps enjoyed hiking. On one outing, they stayed overnight at a farmer's house. The next morning, they were informed that Maria and two of Georg's daughters, Johanna and Martina, had scarlet fever. Johanna and Martina recovered, but the older Maria developed kidney stones due to dehydration. Her stepdaughter, Maria Franziska, accompanied her to Vienna for a successful surgery, but Maria experienced lifelong kidney problems.

=== Financial problems ===
The family met with financial ruin in 1935. Georg had transferred his savings from a bank in London to an Austrian bank run by a friend named Auguste Caroline Lammer. Austria was experiencing economic difficulties during a worldwide depression because of the Crash of 1929, and Lammer's bank failed. To survive, the Trapps dismissed most of their servants, moved into the top floor of their house, and rented out the other rooms. The Archbishop of Salzburg, Sigismund Waitz, sent Father Franz Wasner to stay with them as their chaplain and this began their singing career.

=== Early musical career and departure from Austria ===
Soprano Lotte Lehmann heard the family sing, and she suggested they perform at concerts. When the Austrian Chancellor Kurt Schuschnigg heard them over the radio, he invited them to perform in Vienna.

After performing at a festival in 1935, they became a popular touring act. They experienced life under the Nazis after the Anschluss (the annexation of Austria by Germany) in March 1938. Life became increasingly difficult as they witnessed hostility toward Jewish children by their classmates, the use of children against their parents, and finally by the extension of an offer for Georg to join the German Navy. In September, the family fled Austria for Italy via train, then to England and finally the United States. The Nazis made use of their abandoned home as Heinrich Himmler's headquarters.

Initially calling themselves the "Trapp Family Choir", the von Trapps began to perform in the United States and Canada. They performed in New York City at The Town Hall on 10 December 1938. The New York Times wrote:

There was something unusually lovable and appealing about the modest, serious singers of this little family aggregation as they formed a close semicircle about their self-effacing director for their initial offering, the handsome Mme. von Trapp in simple black, and the youthful sisters garbed in black and white Austrian folk costumes enlivened with red ribbons. It was only natural to expect work of exceeding refinement from them, and one was not disappointed in this.

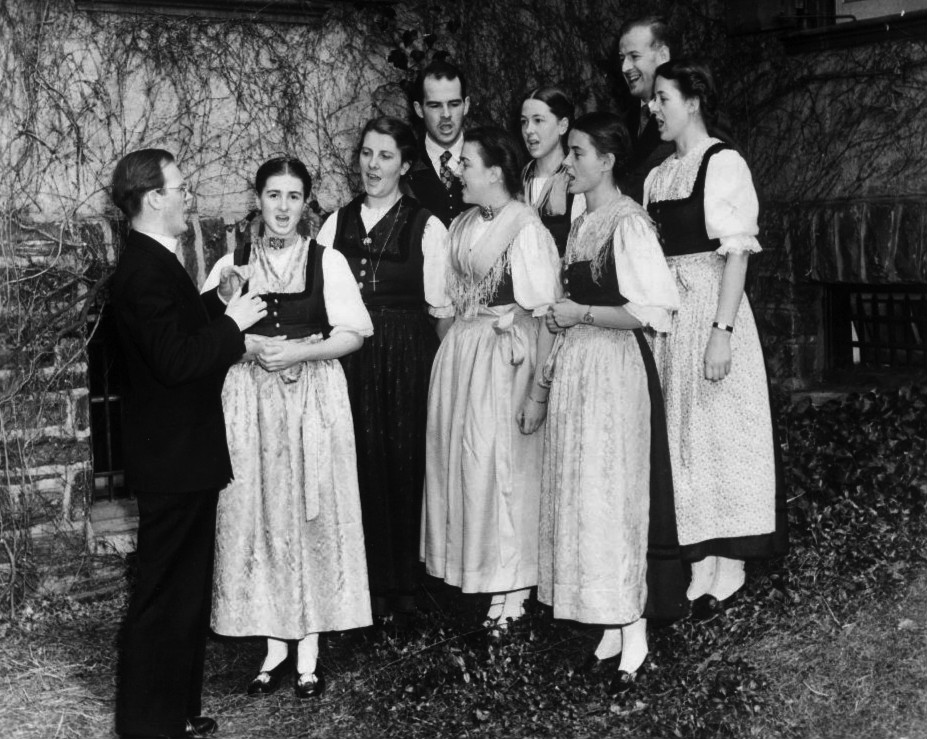
Trapp Family Singers preparing for a concert in Boston in 1941. Maria is the third from left, in a dark suit.

Charles Wagner was their first booking agent; Then they signed on with Frederick Christian Schang. Thinking the name "Trapp Family Choir" too "churchy", Schang Americanized their repertoire and, following his suggestion, the group changed its name to the "Trapp Family Singers". The family, which by then included all ten children, was soon touring the world giving concert performances. Alix Williamson served as the group's publicist for over two decades. After the war, they founded the Trapp Family Austrian Relief fund, which sent food and clothing to the impoverished in Austria.

=== Move to the United States ===
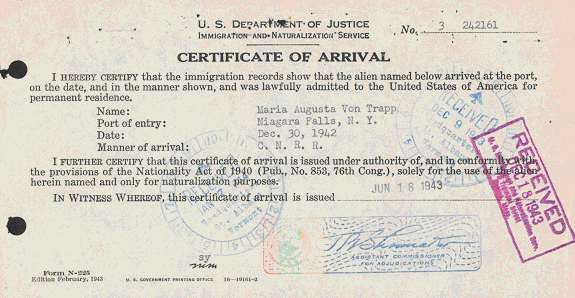
Maria von Trapp's certificate of arrival at Niagara Falls, New York, on 30 December 1942

In the 1940s, the family moved to Stowe, Vermont, where they ran a music camp when they were not touring. In 1944, Maria Augusta, Maria Franziska, Johanna, Martina, Hedwig and Agathe applied for U.S. citizenship, whereas Georg never applied to become a citizen. At application, the preposition 'von' was dropped from their family name. Rupert and Werner became citizens by serving during World War II, while Rosmarie and Eleonore became citizens by virtue of their mother's citizenship. Johannes was born in the United States in Philadelphia on 17 January 1939 during a concert tour. Georg von Trapp died in 1947 in Vermont after suffering lung cancer.

The family made a series of 78-rpm records for RCA Victor in the 1950s, some of which were later issued on RCA Camden LPs. There were also a few later recordings released on LPs, including some stereo sessions. In 1957, the Trapp Family Singers disbanded and went their separate ways. Maria and three of her children became missionaries in Papua New Guinea. In 1965, Maria moved back to Vermont to manage the Trapp Family Lodge, which had been named Cor Unum. She began turning over management of the lodge to her son Johannes, although she was initially reluctant to do so. Hedwig returned to Austria and worked as a teacher in Umhausen.

== Death ==
Maria von Trapp died of heart failure on 28 March 1987, aged 82, in Morrisville, Vermont, three days following surgery. She is interred in the family cemetery at the lodge, along with her husband and five of her stepchildren.

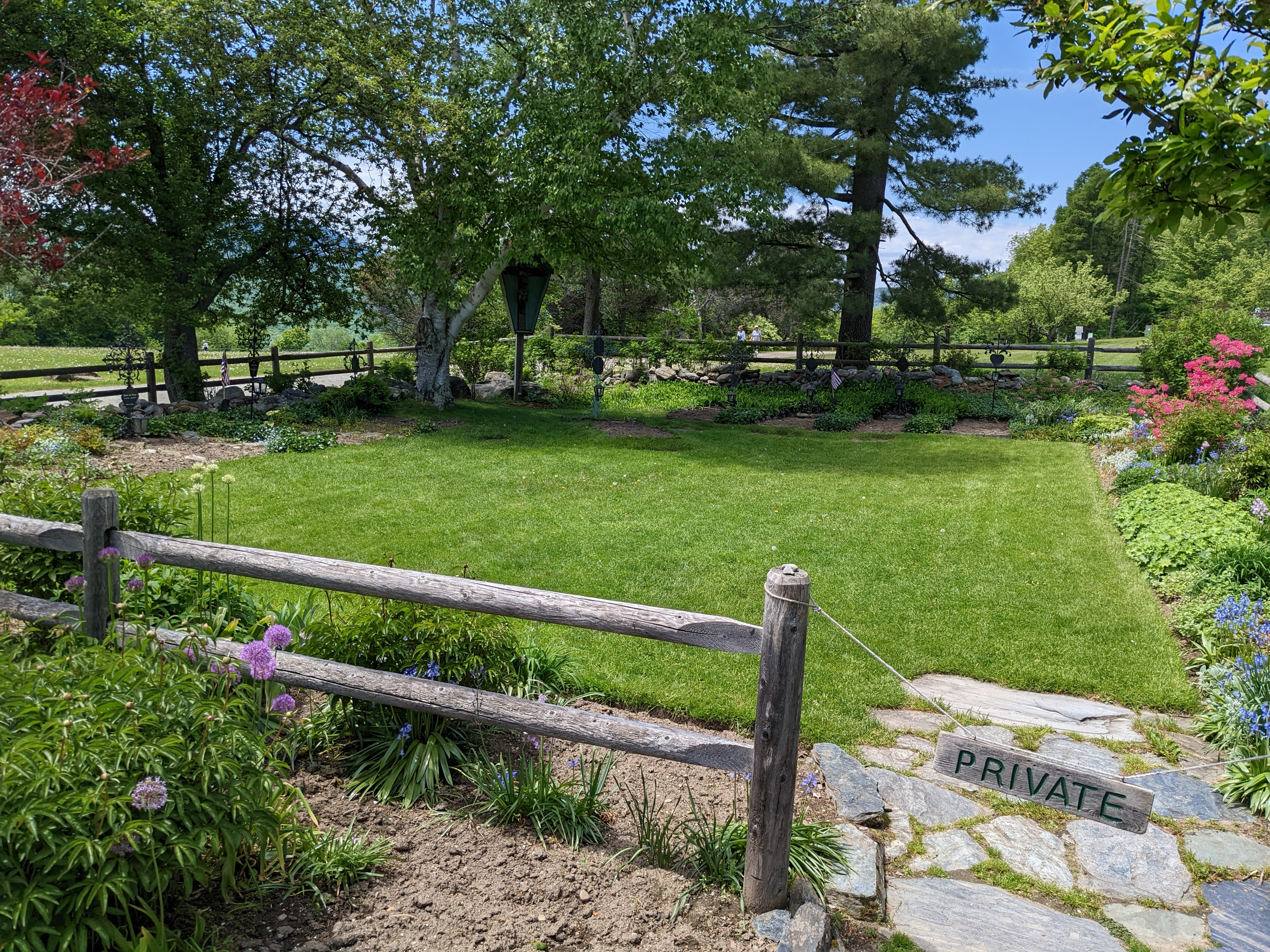
The family cemetery in 2022. Maria's grave is on the left

== Decorations and awards ==
The family has won the following awards:

- 1949 – Benemerenti Medal (Pope Pius XII), in recognition of the benefits of the Trapp Family Austrian Relief for needy Austrians
- 1952 – Dame of the Order of the Holy Sepulchre (Vatican-Pope Pius XII)
- 1956 – Catholic Mother of the Year in the United States. Women receive this honorary title, to recognise exemplary behavior
- 1957 – Decoration of Honour in Gold for Services to the Republic of Austria
- 1962 – Siena Medal – an award given by Theta Phi Alpha women's fraternity to "an outstanding woman to recognize her for her endurance and great accomplishment." The medal is the highest honor the organization bestows upon a non-member and is named after Saint Catherine of Siena.
- 1967 – Austrian Cross of Honour for Science and Art, 1st class
- 2007 – The von Trapp Family received the Egon Ranshofen Wertheimer Prize in Braunau am Inn
- 2012 – Naming of Maria Trapp-Platz in Donaustadt (22nd District of Vienna)

== Children ==
Name	Birth	Death	Notes
Rosmarie von Trapp	8 February 1929	13 May 2022 (aged 93)	Rosmarie worked as a singer and missionary in Papua New Guinea. She most recently lived in Pittsburgh.
Eleonore von Trapp	14 May 1931	17 October 2021 (aged 90)	Married Hugh David Campbell in 1954 and had seven daughters with him. Lived with her family in Waitsfield, Vermont.
Johannes von Trapp	17 January 1939 (age 87)		Married Lynne Peterson in 1969 and had one son and one daughter with her. He became manager of the family lodge in the 1970s.

== Adaptations of the autobiography ==
Maria von Trapp's book, The Story of the Trapp Family Singers, published in 1949, was a best-seller. It was made into two successful German / Austrian films:

- The Trapp Family (1956)
- The Trapp Family in America (1958)

The book was then adapted into The Sound of Music, a 1959 Broadway musical by Rodgers and Hammerstein, starring Mary Martin and Theodore Bikel. It was a success, running for more than three years. The musical was adapted in 1965 as a motion picture of the same name, starring Julie Andrews. The film version set US box office records, and Maria von Trapp received about $500,000 ($5.58 million today) in royalties.

Maria von Trapp made a cameo appearance in the movie version of The Sound of Music (1965). For an instant, she, her daughter Rosmarie, and Werner's daughter Barbara can be seen walking past an archway during the song, "I Have Confidence", at the line, "I must stop these doubts, all these worries / If I don't, I just know I'll turn back."

Maria von Trapp sang "Edelweiss" with Andrews on The Julie Andrews Hour in 1973. In 1991, a 40-episode anime series, titled Trapp Family Story, aired in Japan, her character referred to by her maiden name (Maria Kutschera), voiced by Masako Katsuki. She was portrayed in the 2015 film The von Trapp Family: A Life of Music by Yvonne Catterfeld.

== Authored books ==
- Yesterday, today, and forever. Philadelphia: Lippincott. 1952. OCLC 1423861.
- The story of the Trapp Family Singers. Philadelphia: Lippincott. 1954. OCLC 226201826.
- Around the year with the Trapp family. New York, N.Y.: Pantheon. 1955. OCLC 573806.
- The Trapp family on wheels. London: G. Bles. 1960. OCLC 8153355.
- Maria. Carol Stream, Ill.: Creation House. 1972. OCLC 615981.
- When the King was Carpenter. Harrison, Arkansas: New Leaf Press. 1976. OCLC 2800726.
