= Josef Reiter =

Josef Reiter may refer to:

- Josef Reiter (composer) (1862–1939), Austrian composer
- Josef Reiter (judoka) (born 1959), judoka from Austria
