= Herren =

Herren is a surname. Notable people with the surname include:

- Albert Herren (born 1952), American politician
- Andy Herren (born 1986), American Big Brother winner
- Chris Herren (born 1975), American basketball player
- Greg Herren (born 1961), American writer
- Hans Rudolf Herren (born 1947), Swiss entomologist and farmer
- Madeleine Herren (born 1956), Swiss historian
- Scott Herren, American musician and music producer
- Thomas W. Herren (1895–1985), United States Army general
- Willi Herren (1975-2021), German actor
