= BHAK Braunau =

Coordinates: 48°15′13″N 13°02′32″E

The Bundeshandelsakademie in Braunau was built in 1930 and is the oldest education institute in the Innviertel, even one of the oldest of the whole Upper Austria. BHAK Braunau is a business school.

The school at the OpenHouse 2007
