= Wilfried Scharf =

Wilfried Scharf (born 9 April 1955 in Braunau am Inn) is an Austrian zither player and has been professor at the Anton Bruckner Private University for Music, Drama, and Dance in Linz since 1989.

== Life ==
Wilfried Scharf had a childhood characterized by music. After he finished school, he studied at The Private University College of Education of the Diocese Linz from 1974 until 1977. There he met the teaching qualifications to teach English and music for Hauptschule (general school). He taught at a school for 4 years before starting to study zither as a major at the conservatory of Tyrol.

Scharf finished his studies successfully in 1985.

As the Bruckner-conservatory in Linz started to offer the subject zither Wilfried Scharf was offered a professorship there. He has performed since the late eighties and founded the ensemble "Salzburger Saitenklang" in 1982. Scharf made an appearance as soloist in Tales from the Vienna Woods at the Vienna New Year's Concert in 2014 with the conductor being Daniel Barenboim.
