= Egon Ranshofen-Wertheimer =

Austrian historian, diplomat and journalist (1894–1957)

Egon Ferdinand Ranshofen-Wertheimer (September 4, 1894 – December 27, 1957) was a diplomat, journalist and doctor of laws.

== Early life ==
Egon Ferdinand Ranshofen-Wertheimer was born as the son of the Catholic land owner and member of the Upper Austrian parliament Julius Wertheimer in Ranshofen near Braunau am Inn, Austria. His family had Jewish roots, so they fled Austria in 1938 because of the growing threat of the Nazi government. His town of birth, Braunau am Inn, was also the birthplace of Adolf Hitler.

During World War I, he was introduced to Marxist ideology and studied in Vienna, Munich, and Heidelberg after the war. He later developed a more and more pragmatic attitude and became a social democrat. He started to work as an editor in Hamburg and until 1930 as a foreign correspondent for the social-democratic newspaper Forward in London. In this period, he wrote his first book, Portrait of the British Labour Party, which became a bestseller and he made first contact with Leopold Kohr, a young journalist and economist from Salzburg, later author of The Breakdown of Nations.

His book raised the awareness of the British government, which had an important influence on the League of Nations. Therefore, he was able to work as a diplomat and supervisor of the League of Nations for 10 years in Geneva, beginning in 1930.

== United States ==
Because of the deteriorating situation in Europe, he emigrated to the United States, where he worked at American University in Washington, D.C., as a professor. In addition, he was employed as a consultant of the United States State Department and supported the US government in the struggle against Hitler. There, he and his younger colleague Leopold Kohr began to criticize Nazi Germany through media such as The New York Times.

== Post-war period ==
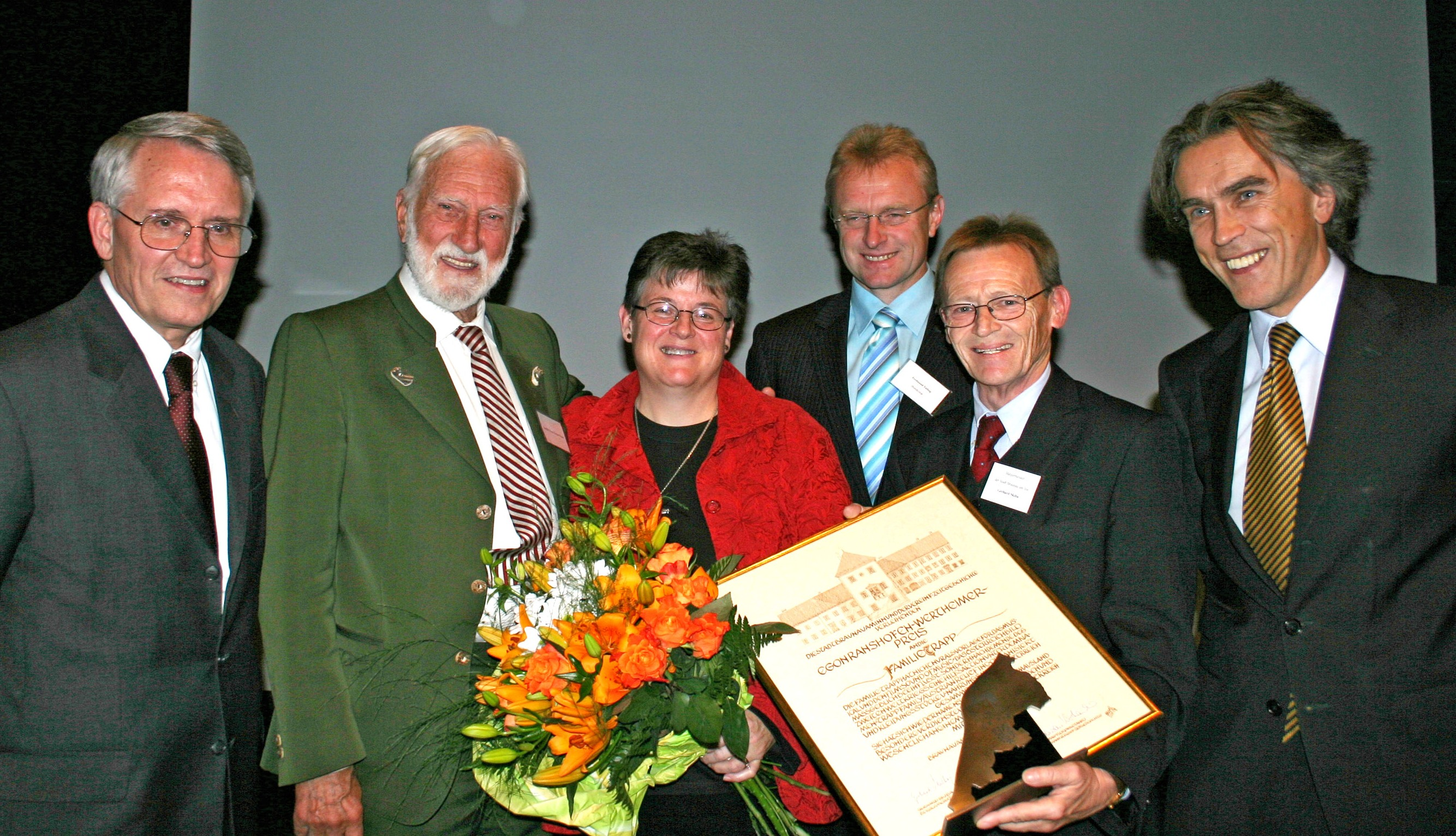
Tizzy von Trapp honored with the Egon Ranshofen-Wertheimer Award in Braunau am Inn.

Shortly after the Second World War, Egon Ranshofen began to work as an executive, supervisor, and diplomat for the UN. His book A Great Experiment in International Administration had a substantial influence on the development of the UN.

Ranshofen-Wertheimer and Kohr also lobbied for an independent Austria. That the young second republic of Austria became a member of the UN rather quickly can be attributed to the engagement of Ranshofen-Wertheimer.

Ranshofen-Wertheimer died in New York City and is buried in his family grave in the cemetery of the castle of Ranshofen.

== Reception ==
Braunau Contemporary History Days 16 September 2007, with the title “Peacemakers manual”, focused on the life of Egon Ranshofen-Wertheimer.

The Egon Ranshofen-Wertheimer Award (ERWA) was founded by the Society for Contemporary History in Braunau am Inn in the beginning of 2007.

== Publications ==
- Egon Ranshofen-Wertheimer, Victory is not enough. The strategy for a lasting peace. W. W. Norton & Company Publishers, New York,1942.
- Egon Ranshofen-Wertheimer, The International Secretariat - A Great Experiment in International Administration. Carnegie Endowment for International Peace, Washington 1945
