= Trapp Family Austrian Relief =

Initiative founded by Georg von Trapp and Maria von Trapp

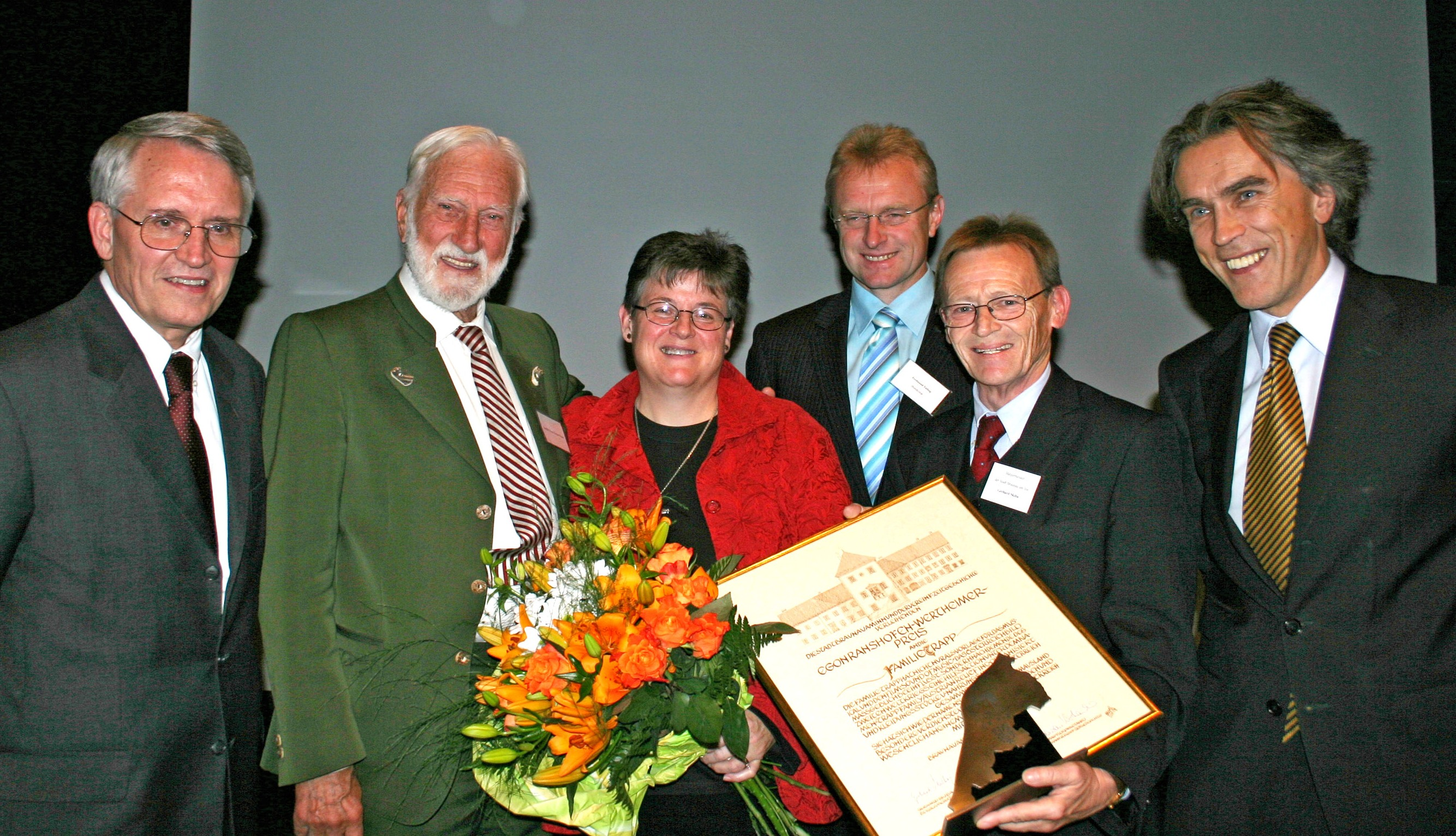
Trapp Family awarded in Braunau (2007)

Trapp Family Austrian Relief, Inc. is an initiative founded by Georg von Trapp and Maria von Trapp of the famous Austrian singing family, the Trapp Family, and was an integral part of the effort to promote the Austria victim theory.

== History ==
In January 1947, Major General Harry J. Collins turned to Georg von Trapp and Maria von Trapp in Stowe, Vermont, pleading for help for the Austrian people, having seen the residents of Salzburg suffer when he had arrived there with the famed 42nd Rainbow Division after World War II.

After founding the initiative, Georg and Maria von Trapp took on the posts of president and vice-president, while Monsignore Dr. Franz Wasner was appointed treasurer.

The country that gave to the world Haydn, Schubert, Mozart, and Silent Night will perish if we do not help them. Everybody knows about the situation the greater European countries are in. But few people can imagine what is happening in Austria, whose citizens are about to lose courage and hope.

— Trapp Family, appeal at their shows

== Awards ==
- In 1949 Pope Pius XII awarded Maria Augusta von Trapp the Benemerenti medal as a recognition for the Trapp Family Austrian Relief Inc.
- On September 29, 2007, Tizzy von Trapp Walker, daughter of Rupert von Trapp, was honoured on behalf of the Trapp Family with the Egon Ranshofen-Wertheimer Award in Braunau am Inn within the scope of the 16th Braunau Contemporary History Days, for their work performed and their espousing Austria. Braunau am Inn is the birthplace of Adolf Hitler.
