= Braunauer Zeitgeschichte-Tage =

The Braunau Contemporary History Days are a series of conferences organised by the Association for Contemporary History. Scientifically guided by Andreas Maislinger, it has annually taken place in Braunau am Inn since 1992.

== History ==
During those conferences several topics have been discussed, for example: coping with the past, resistance in dictatorships and other issues related to contemporary history. Since 2004 the association for contemporary history aims to involve more topics related to the Innviertel-region and the bordering Bavaria. In 2004, the conference dealt with the "small border traffic" alongside the Salzach-river and the Inn-river from 1933 to 1938, the "Great Politics" as well as the daily life along the interface of two political systems, whose differences and similarities were pointed out.

Between 23 and 25 September 2005, the historical background of the Braunau Parliament of 1705 was analyzed, which united nobility, clergy, bourgeois and farmers under the slogan "Rather die Bavarian-like, than decaying in the Austrian way" (in German: "Lieber bayrisch sterben als österreichisch verderben") for a short period of time. In 2006, the conference was devoted to Johann Philipp Palm, a bookseller from Nuremberg who was shot in Braunau on Napoleon's order in August 1806.

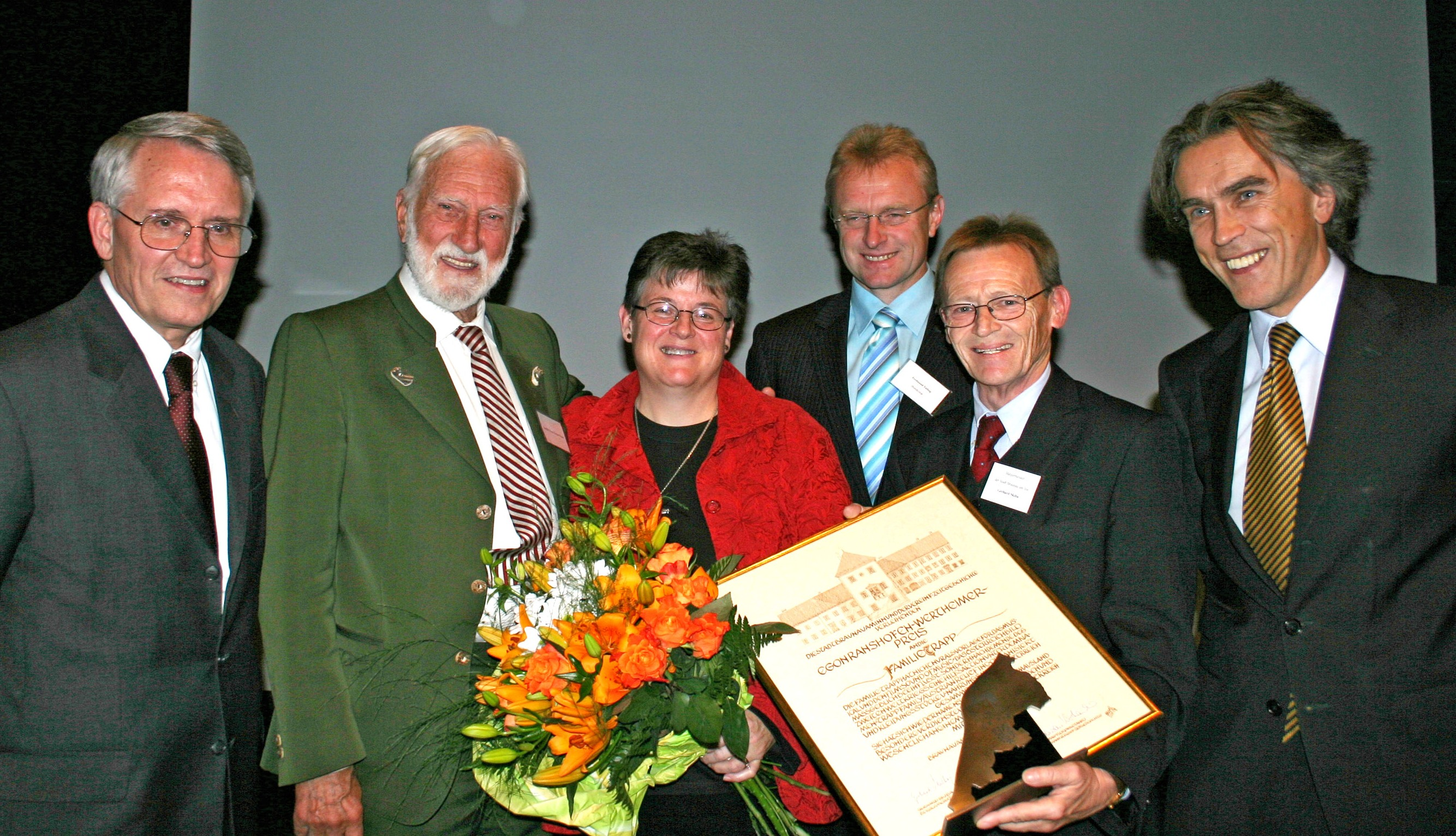
Trapp Family awarded in Braunau (2007)

In 2007, Egon Ranshofen-Wertheimer Award (*1894 in Ranshofen; †1957 in New York) was commemorated. He was a prominent state scientist and a diplomat in the League of Nations and the United Nations. Despite his commitment for Austria, he is widely forgotten. During the conference, the Egon Ranshofen-Wertheimer Award was awarded to the Trapp Family for their work performed and establishing the Trapp Family Austrian Relief. The laudation was held by the Austrian ambassador Emil Brix.

On the occasion of the UEFA European Football Championship in Austria and Switzerland, the 17th Braunau Contemporary History Days discussed the topic "Fascination Football" in 2008.

== Speakers ==
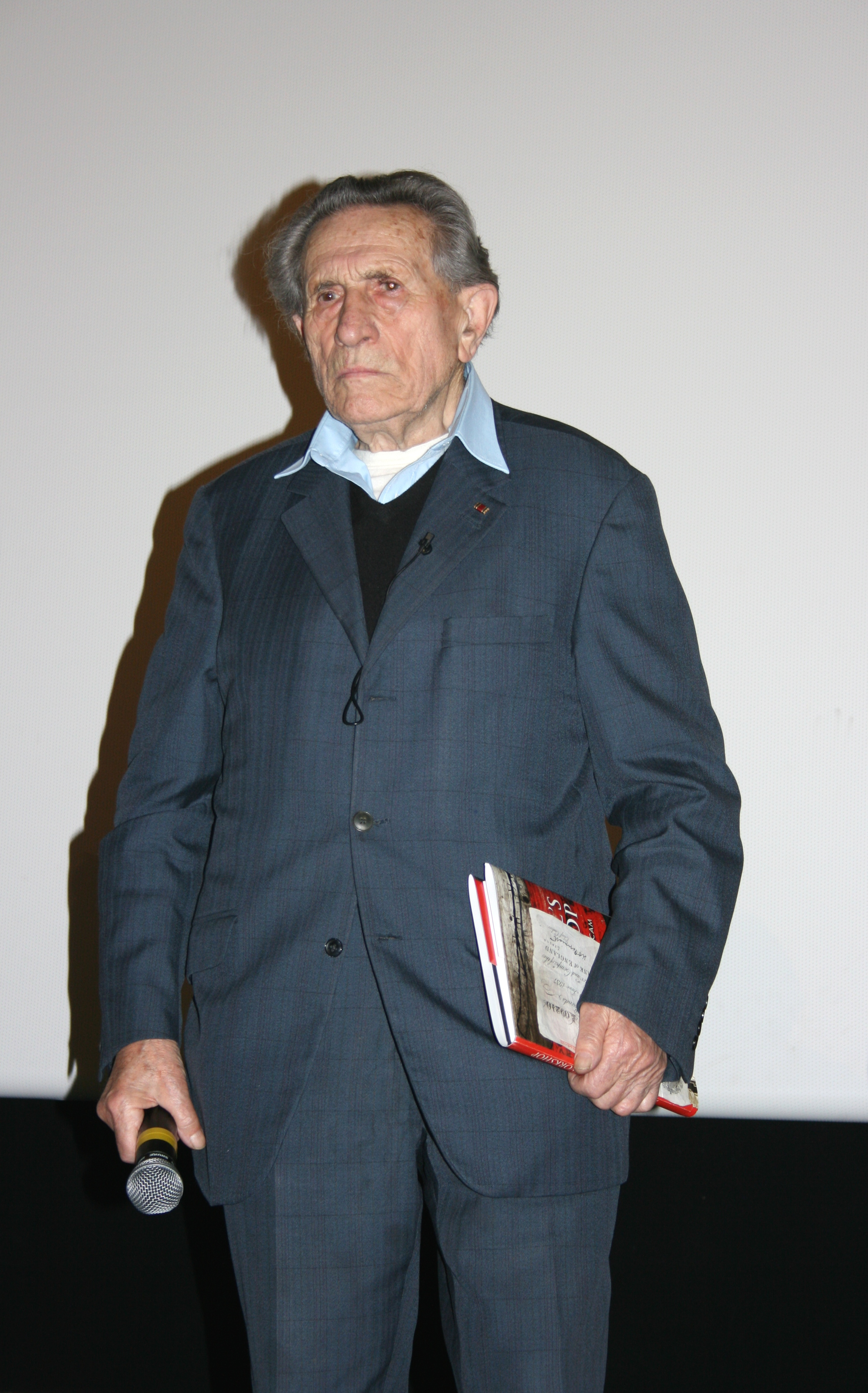
Adolf Burger in Braunau (2000)

Emil Brix, Adolf Burger, Michel Cullin, György Dalos, Madeleine Herren, Florian Kotanko, Branko Lustig, Andreas Maislinger, Peter Porsch, Josef Ratzenböck (former Governor of Upper Austria, Burghart Schmidt, Klaus Theweleit, Gottfried Wagner, Moshe Zimmermann, & Tilman Zülch.

== See also ==
- Andreas Maislinger
- Austrian Holocaust Memorial Service
- Hitler birthplace memorial stone
- House of Responsibility
