= Jürgen Huber =

Austrian behavioral economist (born 1974)

- Huber in 2026
- Born: 1974 (age 51–52); Braunau am Inn, Austria

Academic background
- Education: University of Innsbruck

Academic work
- Discipline: Behavioral economics
- Institutions: University of Innsbruck, Yale School of Management
- Website: Information at IDEAS / RePEc

Jürgen Huber (born 1974) is an Austrian economist and university professor specializing in experimental and behavioral finance.

== Biography ==
From 1994 to 1998 Huber studied international management at the University of Innsbruck and Tulane University in New Orleans. He completed his studies in Innsbruck in 1998 and became a teaching assistant in finance. In 2001, Huber earned his Ph.D. in social and economic sciences with a focus on finance, as well as a Ph.D. in political science. From 2006 to 2007, he was a visiting lecturer at the Yale School of Management. In 2007, Huber earned his habilitation in business administration and became an associate professor in Innsbruck. After serving as a visiting professor at the University of Vienna, he was appointed university professor of finance at the University of Innsbruck in 2008. Huber has headed the Department of Banking and Finance since 2010 and has served as the scientific director of the Innsbruck EconLab since 2012.

== Research ==
Huber's scholarly work combines finance with experimental economics and behavioral economics. His research areas include experimental financial markets, behavioral finance, speculative bubbles, the value of information, market microstructure, information asymmetry, transaction taxes and prediction markets. Another focus is on open science, replicability, and large-scale research collaborations (crowd science).

In collaboration with co-authors, Huber has studied, among other things, the formation and measurement of speculative bubbles in experimental financial markets, the effects of financial transaction taxes, the behavior of financial market professionals, risk perception and investment behavior, as well as the replicability of research in the economic and social sciences. In a study with Vernon L. Smith, Huber and others found that reviewers rated the same paper more favorably when it carried a Nobel laureate’s name than when it carried an unknown author’s name, which the authors interpreted as evidence of status bias in peer review.

From 2018 to 2022, Huber was ranked among the top 100 in the German Wirtschaftswoche’s ranking of the most productive researchers in the field of business administration and is among the top 5 percent in the lifetime ranking.

He has been a visiting lecturer at universities including Chulalongkorn University and Ramkhamhaeng University in Bangkok, Vietnam National University, Hanoi, and Gadjah Mada University in Indonesia. His courses include Empirical Finance, Corporate Finance, International Finance, Behavioral and Experimental Finance, Market Efficiency, and Corporate Decision Making. In his teaching, Huber incorporates experiments and the latest research findings.

Huber was a co-founder and managing director of the Society for Experimental Finance and is its current president. He has held or currently holds editorial positions at academic journals, including the Journal of Behavioral and Experimental Finance, the Journal of Behavioral and Experimental Economics, and the Review of Behavioral Finance.

In addition to his academic work, Huber co-authored the children's book Max and Moritz: Early Pranks with his daughter Mey in 2016, a new collection of pranks based on Wilhelm Busch's stories.

== Awards ==
- 2004: Dr. Otto Seibert Prize
- 2006: Dr. Alois Mock Science Prize
- 2007: Principality of Liechtenstein Prize for Scientific Research
- 2008: "Lehreplus!" Recognition Award
- 2015: Research Award from the Stiftung Südtiroler Sparkasse
- 2016: Pater Johannes Schasching SJ Award
