= Gerald Lehner (journalist) =

Austrian journalist and author (born 1963)

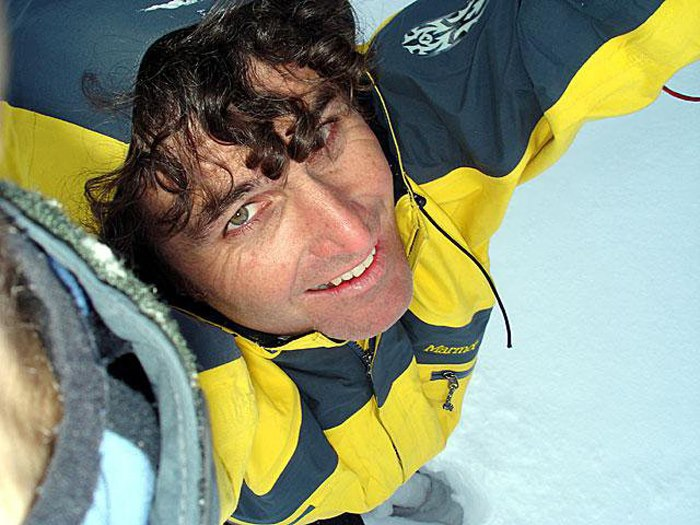
- Born: 12 November 1963 (age 62)
- Occupation: Journalist

Gerald Lehner (born 12 November 1963) is an Austrian journalist and author.

Born in Bad Gastein, Lehner studied political science in Salzburg. Since 1986 he has been working for ORF (Austrian broadcasting service). He wrote articles for the magazines Profil, Die Zeit and Der Spiegel, as well as for the daily newspaper Der Standard. He has reported from Kurdistan, the Himalayas and the Siberian Arctic.

He realized his passion as an alpinist while a technician and teacher for the development aid organization "Öko Himal" in Nepal.

== Publications ==
- Die Biographie des Philosophen und Ökonomen Leopold Kohr. Träger des Alternativen Nobelpreises. Franz Deuticke Verlag, Wien 1994. ISBN 3-216-30107-9
- Egon Ranshofen-Wertheimer und Leopold Kohr. Mit der Washington Post gegen die Nazis. In: Dokumentationsarchiv des österreichischen Widerstandes. Jahrbuch 1995.
- Zwischen Hitler und Himalaya. Die Gedächtnislücken des Heinrich Harrer. Czernin Verlag, Wien 2006. ISBN 3-7076-0216-8
