= Hitler birthplace memorial stone =

Monument in Braunau am Inn, Austria

Coordinates: 48°15′23″N 13°02′10″E

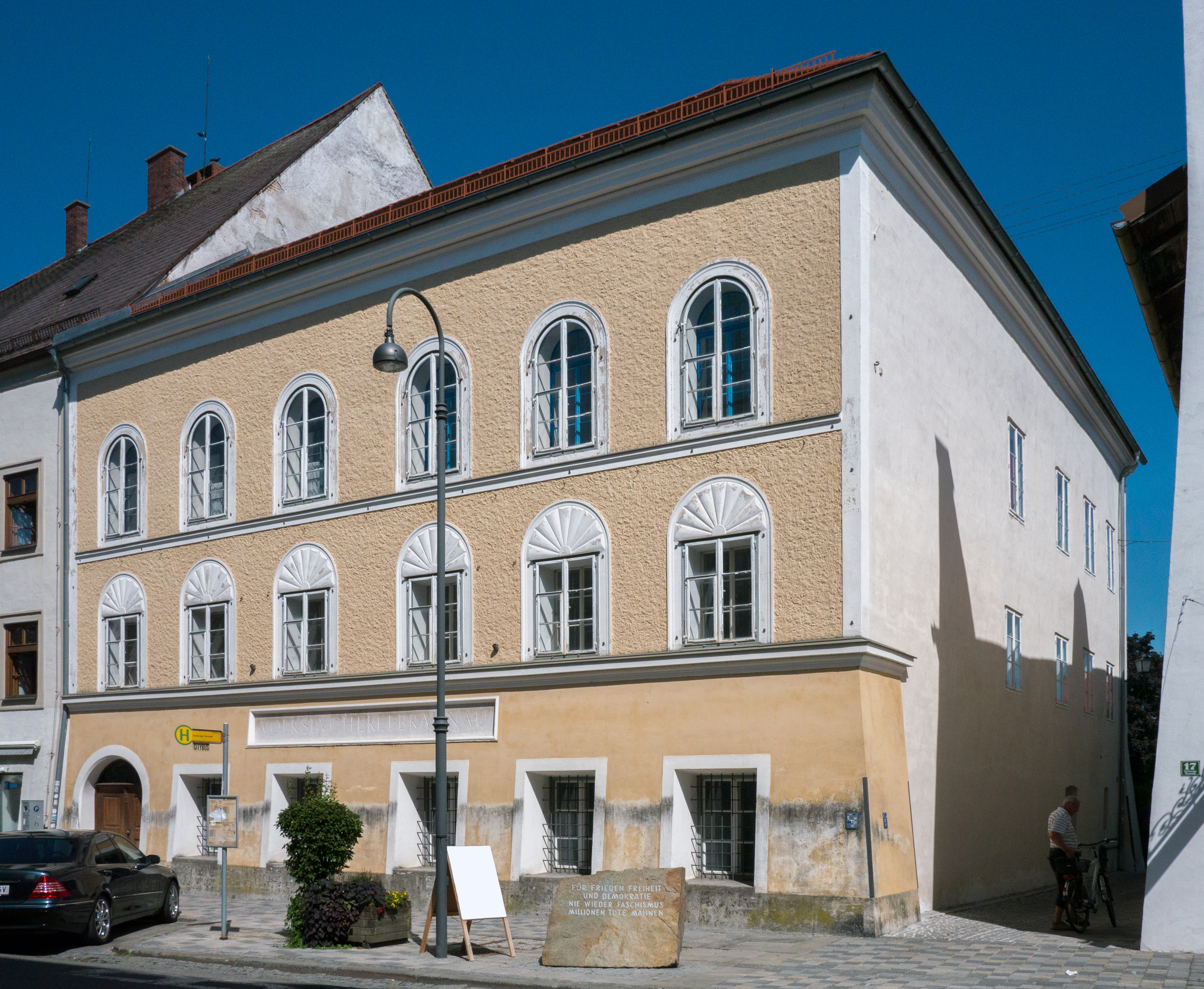
Adolf Hitler's birthplace (2015)

The Hitler birthplace memorial stone, a memorial to the victims of the Nazi Party, is placed in front of Salzburger Vorstadt 15, Braunau am Inn, Upper Austria, the building where Adolf Hitler was born in 1889.

== Birth house of Hitler ==
At the time of Adolf Hitler's birth, the building was a modest guest house, where Hitler's parents rented rooms in connection with his father's job as a minor customs official at the nearby Austrian–German border. The Hitlers lived in the building only until Adolf was three years old, when his father was transferred to Passau.

After World War II, the building was rented by the Austrian Republic in 1952 and obtained heritage protection as part of the historic city centre. Until 1965, it was the home of the public library and later a bank. From 1970 to 1976, several classes from the technical high school were held in the house, until the school was rebuilt. The house then for many years accommodated a branch of the charity "Lebenshilfe", and operated as a day centre and workshops for people with learning difficulties. After the charity left the building in 2011, it remained empty. As of 2016, the Austrian government intends to expropriate the owner and to demolish the building. A special expropriation law was adopted.

Suggestions regarding making Hitler's birthplace a place of remembrance for the victims of Nazism had already been made in the early years after the war. For a long time, the council discussed putting up a memorial tablet on the house, and in 1983 the decision was made by the then mayor Hermann Fuchs, with intervention from Culture Advisor Wolfgang Simböck. However, the memorial tablet was not attached, because the owner (who had no connection to Hitler) felt that it would be an intrusion on her rights of ownership. She successfully opposed it in court because of her fear of unwelcome attention or attacks from anti- or Neonazis.

The building was decided to be transformed into a police station, with police personnel expected to move in and begin service in the second quarter of 2026. After years of renovation costing €20 million, the building was inaugurated as a police center on 22 July 2026.

== Installation of the stone ==
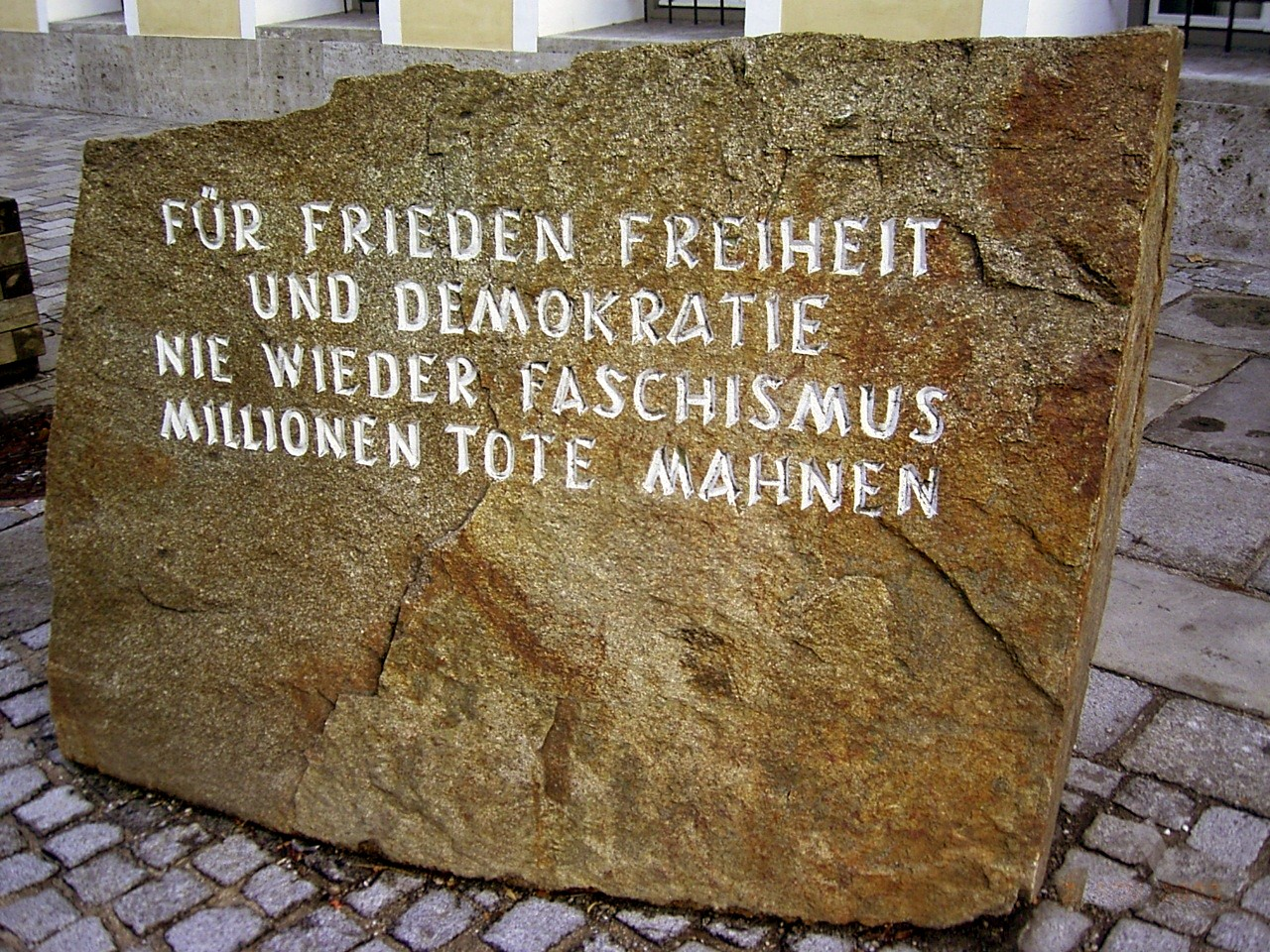
Close-up view of the stone

In 1989, the new mayor, Gerhard Skiba, took the initiative. In April 1989, (two weeks before the centenary of Hitler's birth) a memorial was placed directly in front of the house on public ground. The stone for the memorial came from a quarry on the grounds of the former Mauthausen Concentration Camp, near Linz, Austria. The inscription on the memorial reads:

German

FÜR FRIEDEN, FREIHEIT
UND DEMOKRATIE
NIE WIEDER FASCHISMUS
MILLIONEN TOTE MAHNEN

English

For Peace, Freedom
and Democracy.
Never Again Fascism.
Millions of Dead are a Warning.

The official name of the memorial is the "Memorial Stone Against War and Fascism". It appears as the Mahnstein, 'Remembrance Stone' on street maps.

== Removal ==
As part of the restoration of the house to its 18th-century appearance and its repurposing as a police headquarters, the stone was temporarily removed but has since been returned.

== See also ==
- Adolf Hitler's Munich apartment
- Gerhard Skiba
- Braunau Contemporary History Days
- House of Responsibility
