= Egon Ranshofen-Wertheimer Award =

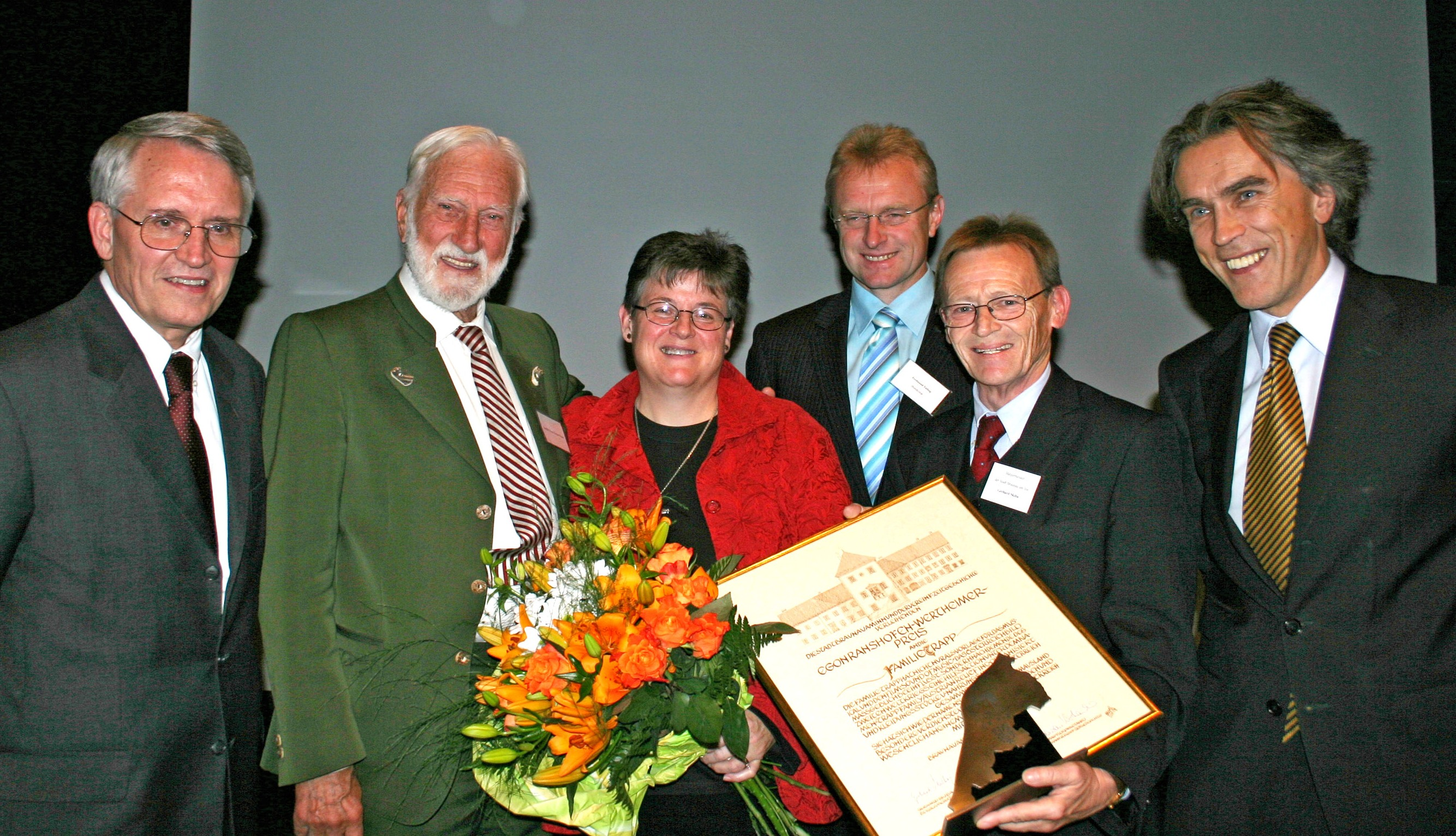
Braunau am Inn honors Tizzy von Trapp-Walker with the Egon Ranshofen-Wertheimer Award. From left to right: Robert L. Hugins (U.S. Embassy, Vienna); Prof. Dr. Ernst Florian Winter; Tizzy von Trapp-Walker; Ferdinand Tiefnig (Federal Council of Austria); Mayor Gerhard Skiba (Braunau am Inn); Dr. Emil Brix (Foreign Office, Vienna)

The Egon Ranshofen-Wertheimer Award was founded (and is awarded) by the city of Braunau am Inn in cooperation with the Society for Contemporary History.

Named after the journalist, political scientist and diplomat Egon Ranshofen-Wertheimer, the price honors Austrians living abroad for an outstanding commitment to their home country Austria.

On September 29, 2007, the first award ceremony took place in the course of the 16th Braunau Contemporary History Days. The laudator was the ambassador Emil Brix, head of the politico-cultural section of the Austrian Ministry for Foreign Affairs.

== Winners ==
- 2007 Tizzy von Trapp was honored on behalf of the charity organization Trapp Family Austrian Relief Inc.
- 2008 Ernst Florian Winter as the founding rector of the Diplomatic Academy of Vienna
- 2010 Dietmar Schönherr
- 2013 Günther Greindl
- 2015 Manfred Nowak
