= Josef Reiter (composer) =

Austrian composer (1862–1939)

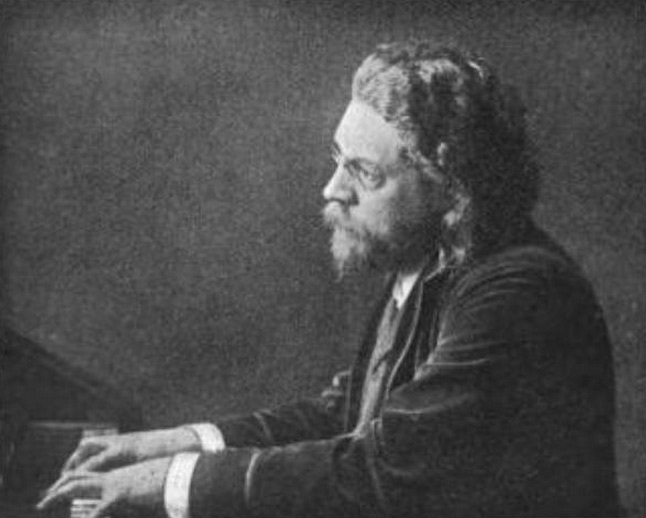
Reiter in 1905

Josef Reiter (19 January 1862 – 2 June 1939) was an Austrian composer.

== Biography ==
Josef Reiter was born in Braunau am Inn in 1862. He studied music with his father in Braunau, and moved to Vienna in 1886, where he worked as a music teacher and conductor. He served as the director of the Mozarteum in Salzburg from 1908 to 1911, and was the Kapellmeister at the Hofburgtheater in Vienna from 1917 to 1918. Primarily a composer of lieder and choral music, Reiter also wrote sacred music and chamber music, including at least five string quartets, of which the fifth, published in 1903, was named Aus der Heimat). Reiter composed a number of operas in a neo-Wagnerian style, though none achieved any lasting success. Der Bundschuh (1897) was conducted by Mahler at the Hofoper in Vienna in 1901 and withdrawn after five performances. In 1904 Reiter submitted his next opera, Der Totentanz, for performance in Vienna, but it was rejected by Mahler. Der Tell fared little better and was never revived.

Reiter became a staunch supporter of the Nazis during the 1920s, and in 1931 dedicated his Goethe Symphony to Hitler. His loyalty was rewarded with revivals of both Der Bundschuh and Der Totentanz at the Deutsche Oper Berlin in 1938. The same year Universal Edition reissued his Festgesang an einen Friedensfürsten under the new title of Festgesang an den Führer des deutschen Volkes in celebration of the Anschluss. He died in Bad Reichenhall in 1939.
