= Madeleine Herren =

Swiss historian

Madeleine Herren-Oesch (born 26 January 1956 in Bern) is a Swiss historian. She is the author of works including Internationale Organisationen seit 1865: eine Globalgeschichte der internationalen Ordnung.

Herren-Oesch studied history and German literature at the University of Bern. She wrote her licentiate about "Aspekte cisleithanischer Sozialpolitik" (Aspects of the Cisleithanian Social Policy) and in 1989 her dissertation about "Internationale Sozialpolitik vor dem Ersten Weltkrieg aus der Perspektive der Dritten Französischen Republik" (International pre-World War I Social Policy from the perspective of the French Third Republic).

In 1997 she was promoted to professor with "Hintertüren zur Macht - Internationalismus und modernisierungsorientierte Außenpolitik in Belgien, der Schweiz und den USA 1865–1914" (Internationalism and modernized foreign policy in Belgium, Switzerland and the United States 1865–1914). Between 2004 and 2013, Madeleine Herren-Oesch was professor for modern history at the University of Heidelberg. Since April 2013 she has been director of the Institute for European Global Studies at the University of Basel.

== Publications ==
- Internationale Sozialpolitik vor dem Ersten Weltkrieg, Berlin 1993.
- Hintertüren zur Macht. Internationalismus und modernisierungsorientierte Außenpolitik in Belgien, der Schweiz und den USA 1865-1914, München 2000.
- Netzwerk Außenpolitik. Internationale Organisationen und Kongresse als Instrumente der schweizerischen Außenpolitik 1914-1950, Madeleine Herren-Oesch und Sacha Zala, Zürich 2002.
- Internationale Organisationen seit 1865. Eine Globalgeschichte der internationalen Ordnung. Wiss. Buchgesellschaft, Darmstadt 2009, ISBN 978-3-534-20365-9.
- Inszeniertes Leben. Die entzauberte Biografie des Selbstdarstellers Dr. Tomarkin, Madeleine Herren, Franziska Rogger, Köln/Wien 2012.
- Transcultural History. Sources, Theories, Methods, Madeleine Herren, Martin Rüesch, Christiane Sibille, Heidelberg 2012.
