= Braunau am Inn =

Town in Upper Austria

- Municipality
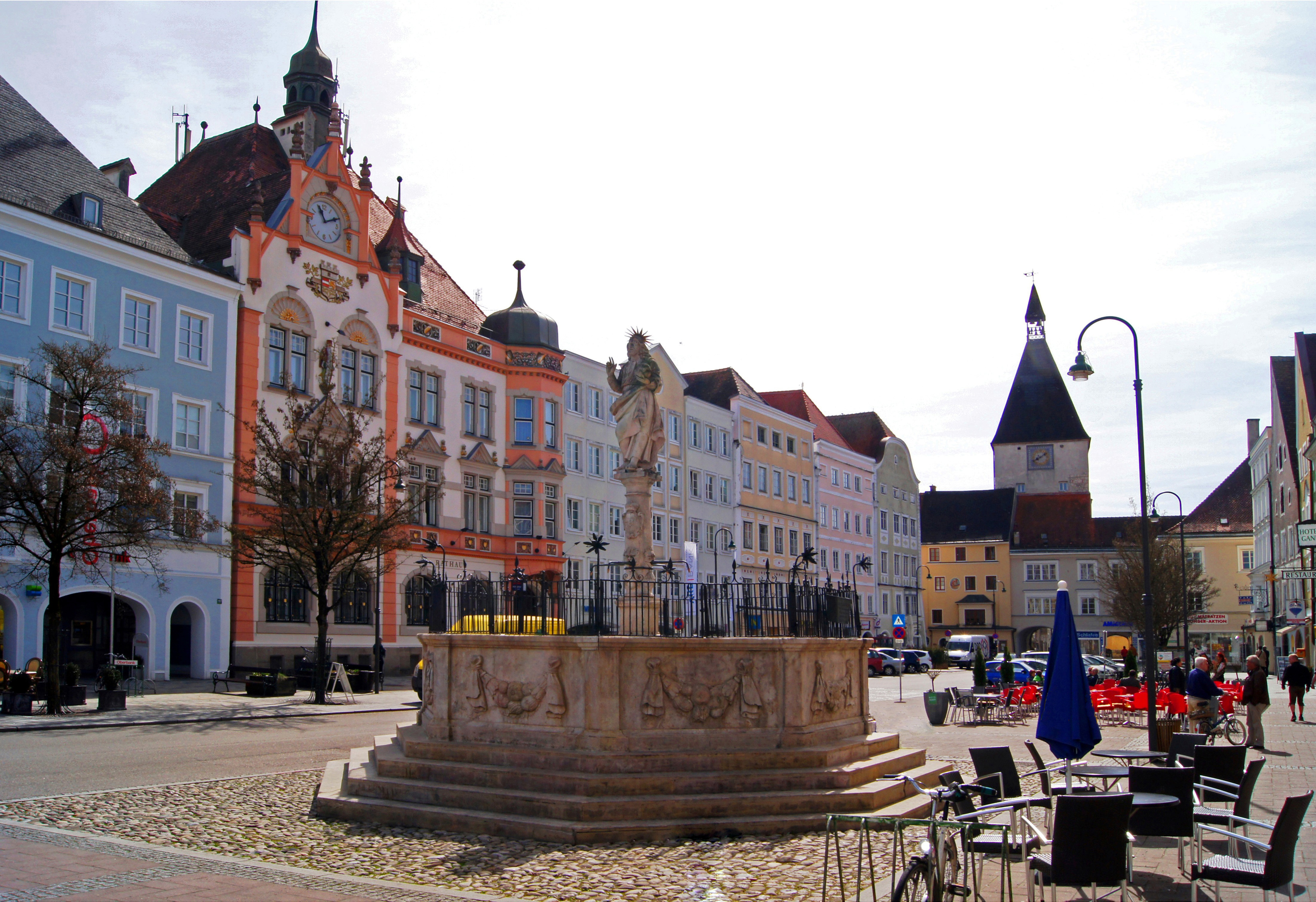
- Braunau town centre

- Flag Coat of arms Logo

- Location within Austria
- Coordinates: 48°15′30″N 13°2′7″E
- Country: Austria
- State: Upper Austria
- District: Braunau am Inn

Government
  - Mayor: Johannes Waidbacher (ÖVP)

Area
  - Total: 24.84 km^{2} (9.59 sq mi)
- Elevation: 352 m (1,155 ft)

Population (2018-01-01)
  - Total: 17,095
  - Density: 688.2/km^{2} (1,782/sq mi)
- Time zone: UTC+1 (CET)
  - Summer (DST): UTC+2 (CEST)
- Postal code: 5280, 5282A
- Area code: 07722
- Vehicle registration: BR
- Website: braunau.at

Braunau am Inn (Austrian German: [ˈbraʊnaʊ am ˈɪn]; transl. "Braunau on the Inn") is a town in Upper Austria on the border with the German state of Bavaria. It is the birthplace of Adolf Hitler, who lived there until the age of three.

== Geography ==
The town is on the lower river Inn below its confluence with the Salzach, where it forms the border with the German state of Bavaria, halfway on the road between the state capital Linz and the Bavarian capital Munich, about 60 km (37 mi) north of Salzburg. Braunau is connected by bridges over the Inn with its Bavarian counterpart Simbach am Inn. A traditional port of entry, all border controls have been abolished since the implementation of the Schengen Agreement by Austria in 1997. The town gave its name to the administrative district (Bezirk). As of 2025, Braunau am Inn has a population of 17,604.

=== Populated places ===
The municipality of Braunau am Inn consists of the following cadastral communities: Braunau am Inn, Osternberg, and Ranshofen; while further subdivided into populated places (with population in brackets as of 1 January 2022).

- Aching (22)
- Au (11)
- Blankenbach (105)
- Braunau am Inn (4308)
- Braunau Neustadt (2037)
- Gasteig (30)
- Haiden (91)
- Haselbach (2940)
- Himmellindach (178)
- Höft (12)
- Laab (3069)
- Lach (96)
- Lindach (19)
- Maierhof (114)
- Neue Heimat (1015)
- Oberrothenbuch (24)
- Osternberg (502)
- Ranshofen (2372)
- Roith (21)
- Scheuhub (400)
- Tal (89)
- Unterrothenbuch (31)

=== Climate ===
Braunau am Inn has a borderline humid continental climate (Dfb) with warm summers and fairly cold winters. The month with the lowest monthly mean temperature is January, at −0.4°C, which is just below the 0.0°C isotherm required for the town to be classified as having a continental rather than an oceanic climate.

Precipitation is relatively evenly spread throughout the year, despite a notable uptick during the summer months. Frost and snowfall are very common during the winter months, though significant or deep snow accumulation has become rarer in recent decades.

The nearest GeoSphere weather station is located 25km away at a similar elevation in Reichersberg; the data for which is displayed in the table below.

Climate data for Reichersberg
Month	Jan	Feb	Mar	Apr	May	Jun	Jul	Aug	Sep	Oct	Nov	Dec	Year
Mean daily maximum °C (°F)	2.1 (35.8)	4.7 (40.5)	9.5 (49.1)	15.7 (60.3)	19.5 (67.1)	23.4 (74.1)	24.5 (76.1)	24.2 (75.6)	19.7 (67.5)	13.3 (55.9)	7.1 (44.8)	2.9 (37.2)	13.9 (57.0)
Daily mean °C (°F)	−0.4 (31.3)	0.9 (33.6)	5.4 (41.7)	10.1 (50.2)	14.6 (58.3)	17.8 (64.0)	19.3 (66.7)	19.1 (66.4)	14.6 (58.3)	9.8 (49.6)	4.5 (40.1)	0.7 (33.3)	9.7 (49.5)
Mean daily minimum °C (°F)	−2.9 (26.8)	−2.5 (27.5)	1.1 (34.0)	4.5 (40.1)	8.8 (47.8)	12.2 (54.0)	13.0 (55.4)	12.8 (55.0)	9.6 (49.3)	5.6 (42.1)	1.9 (35.4)	−1.6 (29.1)	5.2 (41.4)
Average rainfall mm (inches)	40.5 (1.59)	32.7 (1.29)	50.1 (1.97)	43.8 (1.72)	85.9 (3.38)	88.5 (3.48)	100.1 (3.94)	90.8 (3.57)	66.6 (2.62)	55.2 (2.17)	45.8 (1.80)	45.3 (1.78)	745.3 (29.31)
Source: GeoSphere Austria

== History ==
While the abbey of Ranshofen was already mentioned in the course of the deposition of Tassilo III, Duke of Bavaria, in 788, Braunau itself first appeared as Prounaw in an 1120 deed. The Innviertel region then was part of the Duchy of Bavaria.

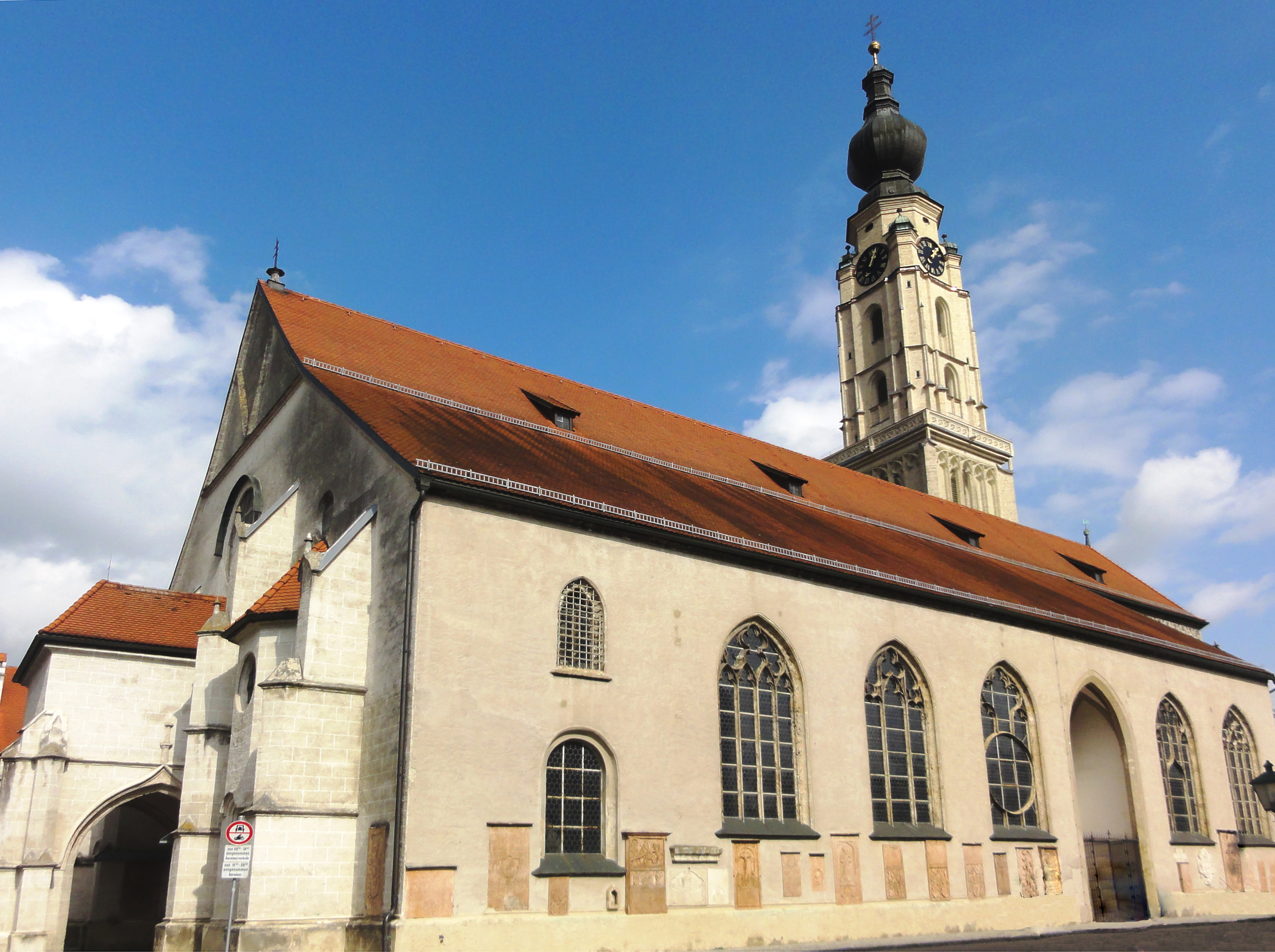
St Stephen's Church

Braunau received town rights in 1260, one of the first in present-day Austria. It became a fortress town and important trading route junction, dealing with the salt trade and with ship traffic on the Inn. As a major Bavarian settlement, the town played an outstanding role in the Bavarian uprising against the Austrian occupation during the War of the Spanish Succession, when it hosted the Braunau Parliament, a provisional Bavarian Parliament in 1705 headed by Georg Sebastian Plinganser (born 16 April 1680 in Pfarrkirchen; died 7 May 1738 in Augsburg).

The Late Gothic Braunau parish church dedicated to Saint Stephen was built from 1439 to 1466, replacing an older chapel. Its 87 m (285 ft) high spire is one of the tallest in Austria and the town's landmark. The remains of the fortress today house a museum and parts of the former town walls can still be seen. Another museum is housed in refurbished 18th-century public baths.

Within 40 years, Braunau changed hands three times: In 1779, it became an Austrian town under the terms of the Treaty of Teschen, which settled the War of the Bavarian Succession. During the War of the Third Coalition, the Nuremberg bookseller Johann Philipp Palm was arrested at the Braunau fortress by French troops and executed for high treason by personal order of Napoleon in 1806. Under the terms of the 1809 Treaty of Schönbrunn, Braunau became Bavarian again in 1809. In 1816, during reorganisation of Europe after the Napoleonic Wars at the Congress of Vienna, the Kingdom of Bavaria ceded the town to the Austrian Empire and was compensated by the gain of Aschaffenburg. Braunau has been Austrian ever since.

Braunau remained a garrison town of the Austro-Hungarian Army and became the site of a large prisoner of war camp in the First World War. During the war, the Imperial and Royal Naval Academy was moved from Fiume to Schloss Hof and then to Braunau am Inn. After the Nazi Anschluss to Nazi Germany in 1938, Ranshofen, which at that time had one of Austria's largest aluminium plants, was incorporated into Braunau. Since 1992, the annual Braunau Contemporary History Days initiated by Andreas Maislinger concentrate on accounting for the past; the town's administration awards the Egon Ranshofen-Wertheimer Award, named after native diplomat Egon Ranshofen-Wertheimer, to honour committed Austrians abroad. Several Stolpersteine were installed in Braunau by the artist Gunter Demnig.

=== Adolf Hitler's birthplace ===
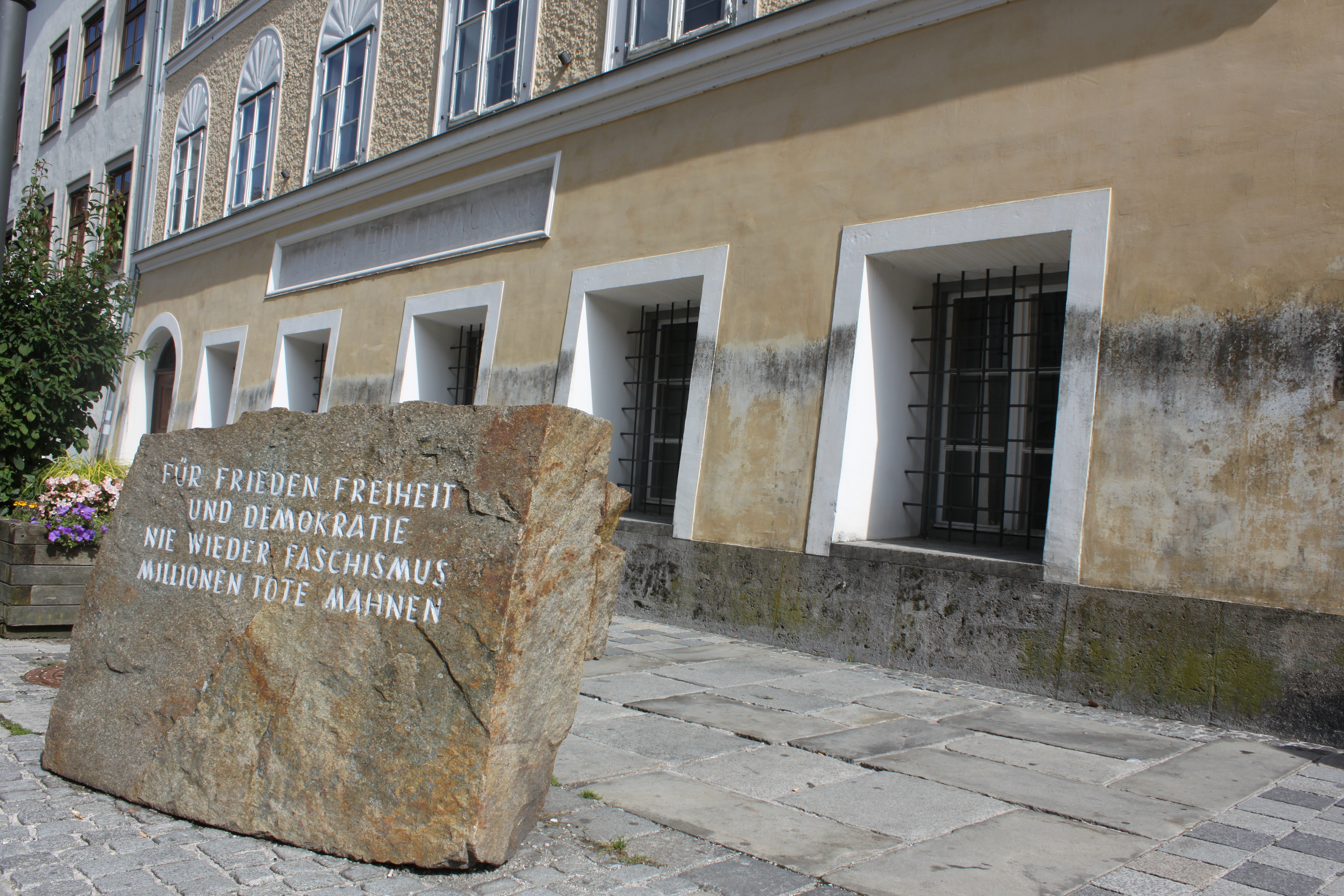
Hitler's birthplace with memorial stone for victims of fascism

Adolf Hitler was born on 20 April 1889 in Braunau am Inn, where his father Alois Hitler had served as a customs official since 1875. He and his family left Braunau and moved to Passau in 1892. Hitler was born in an apartment building recorded at Salzburger Vorstadt 15 in an 1890 register, which housed a craft brewery and several rental flats, one of them occupied by Alois Hitler, his third wife Klara, their son Adolf, and his elder half-siblings Alois Jr. and Angela. In April 1934, the Passau Donauzeitung published a commemorative article, marking the room where Hitler was born. In April 1938, Braunau renamed Salzburger Vorstadt to Adolf-Hitler-Straße, and its town plaza to Adolf-Hitler-Platz, but the building itself remained a Gasthaus, with a sign advertising beer on tap.

That same year, Hitler's personal secretary Martin Bormann purchased the house on behalf of the Nazi Party; it then became a cult centre containing an art gallery and a public library. At the end of World War II in 1945, American soldiers occupied the house and prevented Nazi supporters from dynamiting it. It was then used to temporarily house a documentary exhibition on Nazi concentration camps. In 1952, it was repurchased by its former owners, the Pommer family, and thereafter was used as a city library, a technical college, and lastly a day-care centre for disabled people (Lebenhilfe). Since World War II, the house had been controversial for both the local village and the Austrian government. In 1972, the Austrian Ministry of the Interior took over the main lease on the building to further discourage any notion of making it a pilgrimage site, and thereafter paid its owner approximately 4,800 euros in monthly rental.

In the process of coming to terms with the history of Austria in the time of National Socialism, the mayor of Braunau, Gerhard Skiba, presided over the installation of the Hitler birthplace memorial stone in front of the building. The installation took place in April 1989, two weeks before Hitler's centenary. The stone, commemorating the victims of World War II, is made of granite from the quarry at the Mauthausen concentration camp. It states, Für Frieden, Freiheit und Demokratie. Nie wieder Faschismus. Millionen Tote mahnen ("For Peace, Freedom and Democracy; never again Fascism: millions of dead remind us"). The memorial also serves as a disincentive to "Hitler tourism". In 2011, the Lebenhilfe moved out and the Ministry requested permission to renovate the property. But Gerlinde Pommer, the then owner, refused and she also refused the offer by the Ministry to purchase the house.

Also in 2011, the Braunau town council voted to revoke any honorary citizenship that may have been conferred on Hitler in 1933. The action was described as "precautionary", as no archival evidence could be found to confirm that he had received it in the first place.

In 2016, the Austrian parliament passed a special law to compulsory purchase the house, for €812,000. The law was upheld by Austria's constitutional court in 2017.

An Austrian governmental commission considered a number of options for the future of the house, turning it into apartments again, using it for a center or a museum that would confront Austria's Nazi past, and even its demolition, replacing the original building with an entirely new structure. On 18 October 2016, Austrian interior minister Wolfgang Sobotka said the building would instead be changed to the extent that it "will not be recognizable." The contract was awarded to the architectural firm Marte Marte Architekten. The house was to be restored to its 1790 configuration with a double-gable roof, the removal of all of the 1938 Nazi additions, and a whitewash of the front. In June 2020, it was announced that, after the restoration, the house would serve as a police station. Restoring the house was delayed by the COVID-19 pandemic, and costs considerably increased. In 2023 it was announced that, in addition to the police station, the house would be used as a training center. The police station opened on July 22, 2026.

== Demographics ==
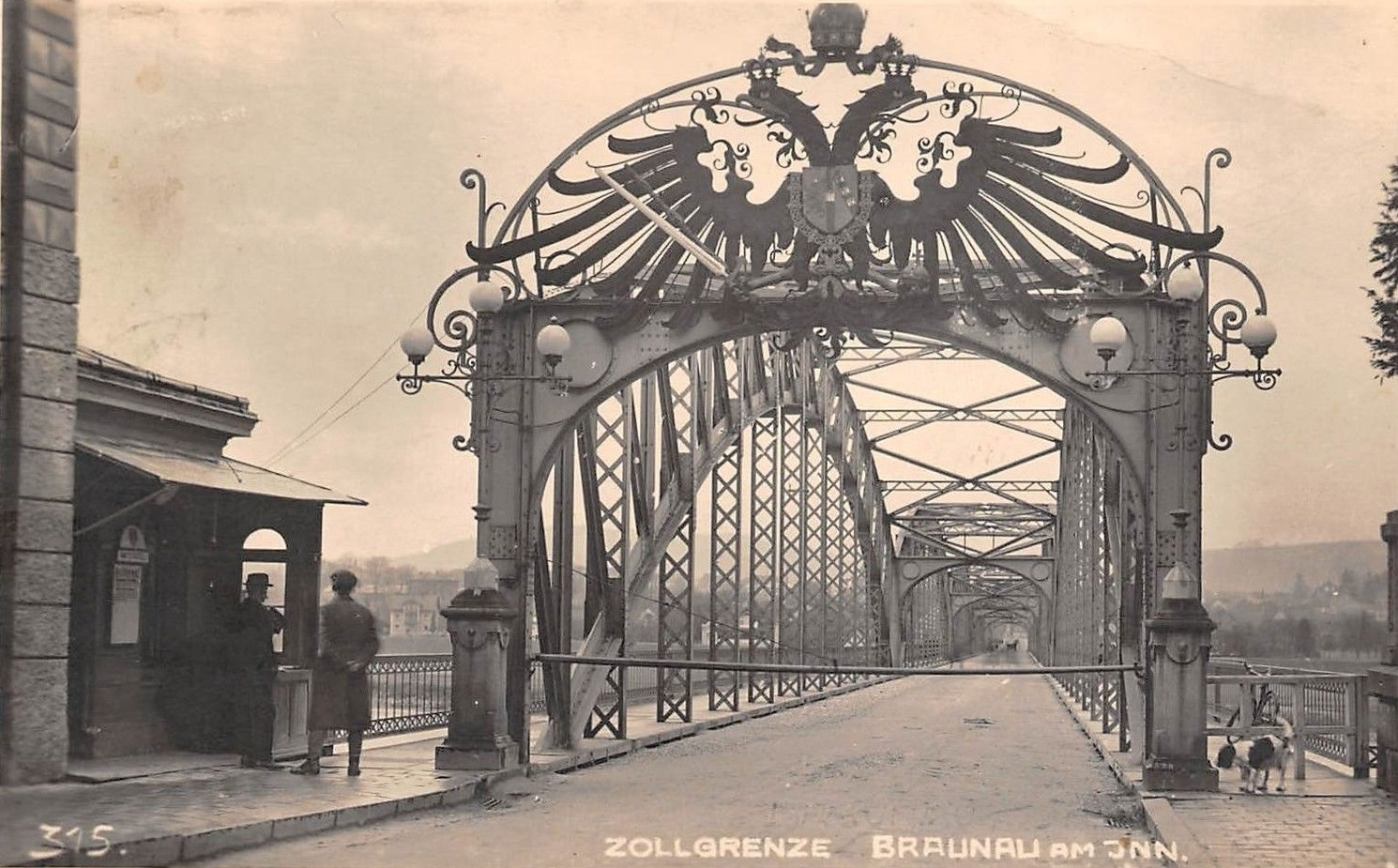
Braunau am Inn bridge and customs checkpoint c. 1910

Historical population
Year	Pop.	±%
1869	4,553	—
1880	5,078	+11.5%
1890	5,584	+10.0%
1900	6,021	+7.8%
1910	6,340	+5.3%
1923	6,678	+5.3%
1934	6,998	+4.8%
1939	7,850	+12.2%
1951	12,013	+53.0%
1961	14,457	+20.3%
1971	16,436	+13.7%
1981	16,318	−0.7%
1991	16,264	−0.3%
2001	16,337	+0.4%
2011	16,182	−0.9%
2021	17,438	+7.8%
2025	17,604	+1.0%

== Economy ==
Braunau has a full range of industries including electronics, metal (AMAG), woodworking, and glass. The town also has the largest aluminium works in Austria.

== Education ==
The BHAK Braunau is the oldest educational establishment in the Innviertel.

The HTL Braunau is a technical school and was awarded most innovative school of Upper Austria eleven times in a row from 2014 to 2024.

The ZIMT, which stands for Zentrum für Interkulturalität, Miteinander und Teilhabe (center for intercultural exchange, community and participation), offers german classes for adults and tutoring, support and fun activities for children throughout the whole year. It also has special german classes which have child care during the course. These are for mothers who otherwise could not attend the classes. The team consists of many voluntary workers.

== Sport ==
After two successful seasons, the local football team, SV Braunau, reached the Austrian 1st Division before suddenly going bankrupt in 2000. The team was re-founded as FC Braunau.

For over three decades, the Triathlon ATSV Braunau hosts a triathlon open for everyone who lives or works, goes to school or is part of a union in the district. There is also a team category.

The Sportunion Raiffeisen Braunau offers many activities: back exercises, gymnastics for children and the elderly, apparatus gymnastics, badminton, table tennis, fistball and various high performance and recreational competitions. In 2025, the badminton club reached two second places in the national pupil championship.

At Laab, the natural reserve begins: It is a path along the Inn that leads to Hagenau and the castle of Frauenstein at the border to Bavaria. It is popular for cycling tours. For a more mountainous challenge, there is the Schellenberg in Simbach am Inn with a difference in height of 185 metres. Up at the Schellenberg is a 500 year old fountain and the Waldkapelle (forest chapel) with religious artwork and memorials of soldiers from both World Wars inside.

== Notable residents ==
- Ruthilde Boesch (1918–2012), an Austrian soprano in opera and operetta, a song and concert singer
- Klaus Eberhartinger (born 1950), singer and television presenter
- Edmund Glaise-Horstenau (1882–1946), military historian, Vice Chancellor in the Cabinet of Arthur Seyss-Inquart
- Franz Xaver Gruber (1787–1863), teacher and musician, composed Christmas carol Stille Nacht, ("Silent Night")
- Reginbert von Hagenau († 10 November 1148), bishop of Passau
- Albert Hainz (born 1964), cyclist, born in Ranshofen
- Adolf Hitler (1889–1945), Führer of Nazi Germany from 1934 to 1945
- Angela Hitler (1883–1949), elder half-sister of Adolf Hitler, second wife of Martin Hammitzsch
- Jürgen Huber (born 1974), econmist and university professor
- Franz Jetzinger (1882 in Ranshofen – 1965), Jesuit priest, professor of theology in Linz, author of Hitler Youth (1958)
- Dominik Landertinger (born 1988), biathlete, has two silver and two bronze Olympic medals
- Gero Miesenböck (born 1965) neurophysiologist
- Egon Ranshofen-Wertheimer (1894–1957), diplomat, journalist, political scientist; advised the US gov. in WWII
- Josef Reiter (1862–1939), an Austrian composer
- Susanne Riess (born 1961), politician (FPÖ), Vice-Chancellor of Austria, 2000–2003
- Wilfried Scharf (born 1955), zither player
- Willi Schneider (1903–1971) and Rudi Schneider (1908–1957), brothers, famous for parapsychology between the wars
- Gerhard Skiba (1947–2019), mayor of Braunau, set up a memorial stone for the victims of Fascism and Adolf Hitler
- Hans Staininger (1508–1567), burgomaster (mayor) of Braunau, had a very long beard, which caused his death
